= 1960–61 Gold Cup =

Tournament details
- Country: Northern Ireland
- Teams: 12

Final positions
- Champions: Glentoran (3rd win)
- Runners-up: Linfield

Tournament statistics
- Matches played: 13
- Goals scored: 61 (4.69 per match)

The 1960–61 Gold Cup was the 42nd edition of the Gold Cup, a cup competition in Northern Irish football.

The tournament was won by Glentoran for the 3rd time, defeating Linfield 4–2 in the final at Solitude.

== Results ==
=== First round ===
Team 1	Score	Team 2
Ballymena United	5–2	Bangor
Cliftonville	0–4	Linfield
Crusaders	1–0	Portadown
Derry City	1–3	Glenavon
Ards	bye	
Coleraine	bye	
Distillery	bye	
Glentoran	bye	

=== Quarter-finals ===
Team 1	Score	Team 2
Crusaders	1–2	Glenavon
Distillery	4–5	Coleraine
Glentoran	3–1	Ballymena United
Linfield	1-1	Ards

==== Replay ====
Team 1	Score	Team 2
Ards	3–5	Linfield

=== Semi-finals ===
Team 1	Score	Team 2
Glentoran	2–0	Glenavon
Linfield	2–2	Coleraine

==== Replay ====
Team 1	Score	Team 2
Linfield	4–1	Coleraine

=== Final ===
9 May 1961

Glentoran	4–2	Linfield
Thompson 35', 87'; Drennan 38'; O'Neill 75'	Report	Walker 76'; Dickson 79'

Solitude, Belfast
Referee: K. J. Seddon (Southport)
