= 1947–48 Gold Cup =

Tournament details
- Country: Northern Ireland
- Teams: 12

Final positions
- Champions: Belfast Celtic (6th win)
- Runners-up: Distillery

Tournament statistics
- Matches played: 11
- Goals scored: 45 (4.09 per match)

The 1947–48 Gold Cup was the 29th edition of the Gold Cup, a cup competition in Northern Irish football. The tournament returned again for the first time since the 1939–40 season, with the Substitute Gold Cup having been played as a replacement tournament during World War II.

The tournament was won by Belfast Celtic for the 6th time and 3rd consecutive season, defeating Distillery 2–0 in the final at Solitude.

== Results ==
=== First round ===
Team 1	Score	Team 2
Ards	2–1	Derry City
Ballymena United	4–2	Glenavon
Distillery	3–2	Bangor
Glentoran	1–0	Cliftonville
Belfast Celtic	bye	
Coleraine	bye	
Linfield	bye	
Portadown	bye	

=== Quarter-finals ===
Team 1	Score	Team 2
Belfast Celtic	5–0	Coleraine
Distillery	5–3	Ards
Glentoran	3–1	Linfield
Portadown	2–1	Ballymena United

=== Semi-finals ===
Team 1	Score	Team 2
Belfast Celtic	1–0	Glentoran
Distillery	6–1	Portadown

=== Final ===
16 September 1947

Belfast Celtic	2–0	Distillery
McMillan 4'; O'Neill 13'	Report

Solitude, Belfast
