= 1959–60 Gold Cup =

Tournament details
- Country: Northern Ireland
- Teams: 12

Final positions
- Champions: Linfield (18th win)
- Runners-up: Portadown

Tournament statistics
- Matches played: 13
- Goals scored: 56 (4.31 per match)

The 1959–60 Gold Cup was the 41st edition of the Gold Cup, a cup competition in Northern Irish football.

The tournament was won by Linfield for the 18th time, defeating Portadown 3–2 in the final at Solitude.

== Results ==
=== First round ===
Team 1	Score	Team 2
Coleraine	3–2	Glentoran
Distillery	3–0	Derry City
Glenavon	2–1	Cliftonville
Portadown	4–0	Ards
Ballymena United	bye	
Bangor	bye	
Crusaders	bye	
Linfield	bye	

=== Quarter-finals ===
Team 1	Score	Team 2
Coleraine	1–1	Bangor
Crusaders	1–5	Linfield
Glenavon	4–5	Ballymena United
Portadown	4–1	Distillery

==== Replay ====
Team 1	Score	Team 2
Bangor	4–0	Coleraine

=== Semi-finals ===
Team 1	Score	Team 2
Ballymena United	1–1	Linfield
Portadown	4–0	Bangor

==== Replay ====
Team 1	Score	Team 2
Linfield	3–1	Ballymena United

=== Final ===
28 December 1959

Linfield	3–2	Portadown
Milburn 49', 66'; Wilson 54'	Report	Walker 30'; Johnston 56'

Solitude, Belfast
Referee: S. Carswell (Belfast)
