= 1923–24 Gold Cup =

Tournament details
- Country: Northern Ireland
- Teams: 10

Final positions
- Champions: Linfield (6th win)
- Runners-up: Distillery

Tournament statistics
- Matches played: 11
- Goals scored: 41 (3.73 per match)

The 1923–24 Gold Cup was the 12th edition of the Gold Cup, a cup competition in Northern Irish football.

The tournament was won by Linfield for the 6th time, defeating Distillery 1–0 in the final at The Oval.

== Results ==
=== First round ===
| Team 1 | Score | Team 2 |
|---|---|---|
| Cliftonville | 4–2 | Ards |
| Barn | 1–1 | Glenavon |
| Glentoran | 6–0 | Larne |
| Newry Town | 1–4 | Distillery |
| Queen's Island | 1–2 | Linfield |

==== Replay ====
| Team 1 | Score | Team 2 |
|---|---|---|
| Glenavon | 3–2 | Barn |

=== Quarter-finals ===
| Team 1 | Score | Team 2 |
|---|---|---|
| Cliftonville | w/o | |
| Distillery | w/o | |
| Glenavon | 2–1 | Glentoran |
| Linfield | w/o | |

=== Semi-finals ===
| Team 1 | Score | Team 2 |
|---|---|---|
| Distillery | 7–0 | Glenavon |
| Linfield | 3–0 | Cliftonville |

=== Final ===
17 March 1924

| Linfield | 1–0 | Distillery |
|---|---|---|
| Scott | Report |

The Oval, Belfast
