= 1945–46 Substitute Gold Cup =

Tournament details
- Country: Northern Ireland
- Teams: 6

Final positions
- Champions: Belfast Celtic (3rd win)
- Runners-up: Linfield

Tournament statistics
- Matches played: 30
- Goals scored: 131 (4.37 per match)

The 1945–46 Substitute Gold Cup was the sixth edition of the Substitute Gold Cup, a cup competition in Northern Irish football. It replaced the Gold Cup, which was suspended due to World War II.

The tournament was won by Belfast Celtic for the 3rd time.

== Group standings ==
Pos	Team	Pld	W	D	L	GF	GA	GR	Pts	Result
1	Belfast Celtic (C)	10	9	0	1	30	10	3.000	18	Champions
2	Linfield	10	7	1	2	28	13	2.154	15	
3	Glentoran	10	4	2	4	22	21	1.048	10	
4	Distillery	10	3	2	5	19	17	1.118	8	
5	Derry City	10	3	0	7	17	26	0.654	6	
6	Cliftonville	10	1	1	8	15	44	0.341	3	

Source: Irish League Archive
(C) Champions
