= 1970–71 Gold Cup =

Tournament details
- Country: Northern Ireland
- Teams: 12

Final positions
- Champions: Linfield (24th win)
- Runners-up: Glentoran

Tournament statistics
- Matches played: 15
- Goals scored: 48 (3.2 per match)

The 1970–71 Gold Cup was the 52nd edition of the Gold Cup, a cup competition in Northern Irish football.

The tournament was won by Linfield for the 24th time, defeating Glentoran 2–1 in the final at The Oval.

== Results ==
=== First round ===
Team 1	Score	Team 2
Ards	4–1	Derry City
Cliftonville	2–2	Ballymena United
Glentoran	3–3	Glenavon
Portadown	2–1	Distillery
Bangor	bye	
Coleraine	bye	
Crusaders	bye	
Linfield	bye	

==== Replays ====
Team 1	Score	Team 2
Ballymena United	0–0	Cliftonville
Glenavon	0–3	Glentoran

==== Second replay ====
Team 1	Score	Team 2
Ballymena United	1–2	Cliftonville

=== Quarter-finals ===
Team 1	Score	Team 2
Ards	1–2	Glentoran
Cliftonville	0–2	Bangor
Linfield	1–1	Crusaders
Portadown	2–1	Coleraine

==== Replay ====
Team 1	Score	Team 2
Crusaders	1–2	Linfield

=== Semi-finals ===
Team 1	Score	Team 2
Glentoran	2–1	Portadown
Linfield	3–2	Bangor

=== Final ===
17 March 1971

Glentoran	1–2	Linfield
Macken 10'	Report	Hamilton 25'; Cathcart 45'

The Oval, Belfast
Attendance: 15,000
Referee: Keith Walker (Maidstone)
