= 1965–66 Gold Cup =

Tournament details
- Country: Northern Ireland
- Teams: 12

Final positions
- Champions: Linfield (21st win)
- Runners-up: Portadown

Tournament statistics
- Matches played: 14
- Goals scored: 57 (4.07 per match)

The 1965–66 Gold Cup was the 47th edition of the Gold Cup, a cup competition in Northern Irish football.

The tournament was won by Linfield for the 21st time, defeating Portadown 6–0 in the final at The Oval.

== Results ==
=== First round ===
Team 1	Score	Team 2
Ballymena United	4–3	Bangor
Coleraine	0–2	Ards
Crusaders	2–1	Derry City
Glentoran	2–2	Glenavon
Cliftonville	bye	
Distillery	bye	
Linfield	bye	
Portadown	bye	

==== Replay ====
Team 1	Score	Team 2
Glenavon	2–1	Glentoran

=== Quarter-finals ===
Team 1	Score	Team 2
Ards	1–2	Cliftonville
Ballymena United	3–3	Crusaders
Distillery	2–2	Portadown
Glenavon	0–1	Linfield

==== Replays ====
Team 1	Score	Team 2
Crusaders	2–0	Ballymena United
Portadown	3–1	Distillery

=== Semi-finals ===
Team 1	Score	Team 2
Linfield	7–0	Cliftonville
Portadown	3–2	Crusaders

=== Final ===
1 December 1965

Linfield	6–0	Portadown
Pavis 9'; Scott 30', 75', 85'; Stewart 56' (pen.); Andrews 90'	Report

The Oval, Belfast
Attendance: 8,000
Referee: S. Carswell
