= 1930–31 Gold Cup =

Tournament details
- Country: Northern Ireland
- Teams: 14

Final positions
- Champions: Linfield (10th win)
- Runners-up: Belfast Celtic

Tournament statistics
- Matches played: 15
- Goals scored: 78 (5.2 per match)

The 1930–31 Gold Cup was the 19th edition of the Gold Cup, a cup competition in Northern Irish football.

The tournament was won by Linfield for the 10th time, defeating Belfast Celtic 6–1 in the final at Grosvenor Park.

== Results ==
=== First round ===
Team 1	Score	Team 2
Ballymena	7–0	Newry Town
Bangor	2–2	Larne
Belfast Celtic	4–2	Portadown
Cliftonville	0–1	Glenavon
Coleraine	2–4	Ards
Distillery	2–0	Derry City
Glentoran	1–2	Linfield

==== Replay ====
Team 1	Score	Team 2
Larne	2–2	Bangor

==== Second replay ====
Team 1	Score	Team 2
Bangor	4–2	Larne

=== Quarter-finals ===
Team 1	Score	Team 2
Belfast Celtic	5–2	Bangor
Distillery	4–2	Glenavon
Linfield	5–0	Ballymena
Ards	bye	

=== Semi-finals ===
Team 1	Score	Team 2
Belfast Celtic	6–3	Ards
Linfield	4–1	Distillery

=== Final ===
10 December 1930

Linfield	6–1	Belfast Celtic
Jones 1', 31'; Grice 8', 80'; Hewitt 17', 72'	Report	Canavan 87'

Grosvenor Park, Belfast
Referee: P. Snape (Blackpool)
