= 1985–86 Gold Cup =

Tournament details
- Country: Northern Ireland
- Teams: 14

Final positions
- Champions: Crusaders (1st win)
- Runners-up: Linfield

Tournament statistics
- Matches played: 94
- Goals scored: 327 (3.48 per match)

The 1985–86 Gold Cup was the 67th edition of the Gold Cup, a cup competition in Northern Irish football.

The tournament was won by Crusaders for the 1st time, defeating Linfield 3–1 in the final at The Oval.

== Group standings ==
Pos	Team	Pld	W	D	L	GF	GA	GD	Pts	Result
1	Linfield	13	7	5	1	37	12	+25	19	Advance to semi-final
2	Glentoran	13	8	3	2	27	14	+13	19	Advance to semi-final
3	Coleraine	13	8	2	3	31	20	+11	18	Advance to semi-final
4	Crusaders	13	8	1	4	32	23	+9	17	Advance to semi-final
5	Ards	13	7	3	3	22	16	+6	17	
6	Larne	13	6	2	5	29	26	+3	14	
7	Distillery	13	5	3	5	28	26	+2	13	
8	Bangor	13	5	3	5	17	18	−1	13	
9	Glenavon	13	3	6	4	20	23	−3	12	
10	Newry Town	13	4	3	6	25	27	−2	11	
11	Ballymena United	13	4	2	7	23	27	−4	10	
12	Cliftonville	13	3	2	8	12	24	−12	8	
13	Portadown	13	3	1	9	14	31	−17	7	
14	Carrick Rangers	13	2	0	11	10	40	−30	4	

Source: Irish League Archive

== Semi-finals ==
Team 1	Score	Team 2
Crusaders	3–2 (a.e.t.)	Glenavon
Linfield	4–1	Coleraine

== Final ==
10 December 1985

Crusaders	3–1	Linfield
Hillis 6'; S. Burrows 81' (pen.); McCullough 85'		Sloan 77'

The Oval, Belfast
Referee: O. Donnelly (Craigavon)
