= 1976–77 Gold Cup =

Tournament details
- Country: Northern Ireland
- Teams: 12

Final positions
- Champions: Glentoran (6th win)
- Runners-up: Linfield

Tournament statistics
- Matches played: 31
- Goals scored: 119 (3.84 per match)

The 1976–77 Gold Cup was the 58th edition of the Gold Cup, a cup competition in Northern Irish football.

The tournament was won by Glentoran for the 6th time, defeating Linfield 5–1 in the final at the Windsor Park.

== Group standings ==
=== Section A ===
Pos	Team	Pld	W	D	L	GF	GA	GR	Pts	Result
1	Glentoran	5	5	0	0	16	5	3.200	10	Advance to final
2	Bangor	5	2	2	1	10	9	1.111	6	
3	Glenavon	5	2	1	2	8	9	0.889	5	
4	Portadown	5	1	1	3	9	10	0.900	3	
5	Distillery	5	1	1	3	8	13	0.615	3	
6	Ards	5	0	3	2	5	10	0.500	3	

Source: Irish League Archive

=== Section B ===
Pos	Team	Pld	W	D	L	GF	GA	GR	Pts	Result
1	Linfield	5	4	1	0	14	4	3.500	9	Advance to final
2	Cliftonville	5	4	0	1	12	7	1.714	8	
3	Larne	5	2	1	2	10	11	0.909	5	
4	Coleraine	5	2	0	3	9	6	1.500	4	
5	Crusaders	5	2	0	3	7	14	0.500	4	
6	Ballymena United	5	0	0	5	5	15	0.333	0	

Source: Irish League Archive

== Final ==
23 November 1976

Linfield	1–5	Glentoran
Lemon 48'	Report	Feeney 16', 35', 56' (pen.); Dickinson 39'; Caskey 44'

Windsor Park, Belfast
Attendance: 10,000
Referee: Malcolm Moffatt (Gilford)
