= 1942–43 Substitute Gold Cup =

Tournament details
- Country: Northern Ireland
- Teams: 6

Final positions
- Champions: Linfield (1st win)
- Runners-up: Belfast Celtic

Tournament statistics
- Matches played: 30
- Goals scored: 132 (4.4 per match)

The 1942–43 Substitute Gold Cup was the third edition of the Substitute Gold Cup, a cup competition in Northern Irish football. It replaced the Gold Cup, which was suspended due to World War II.

The tournament was won by Linfield for the 1st time.

== Group standings ==
Pos	Team	Pld	W	D	L	GF	GA	GR	Pts	Result
1	Linfield (C)	10	9	1	0	37	14	2.643	19	Champions
2	Belfast Celtic	10	6	1	3	28	13	2.154	13	
3	Glentoran	10	4	1	5	23	27	0.852	9	
4	Distillery	10	3	2	5	14	23	0.609	8	
5	Derry City	10	3	1	6	18	27	0.667	7	
6	Cliftonville	10	2	0	8	12	28	0.429	4	

Source: Irish League Archive
(C) Champions
