= 1978–79 Gold Cup =

Tournament details
- Country: Northern Ireland
- Teams: 12

Final positions
- Champions: Portadown (5th win)
- Runners-up: Cliftonville

Tournament statistics
- Matches played: 31
- Goals scored: 105 (3.39 per match)

The 1978–79 Gold Cup was the 60th edition of the Gold Cup, a cup competition in Northern Irish football.

The tournament was won by Portadown for the 5th time, defeating Cliftonville 2–1 in the final at the Windsor Park.

== Group standings ==
=== Section A ===
Pos	Team	Pld	W	D	L	GF	GA	GR	Pts	Result
1	Portadown	5	5	0	0	13	3	4.333	10	Advance to final
2	Linfield	5	4	0	1	15	6	2.500	8	
3	Glenavon	5	3	0	2	9	11	0.818	6	
4	Ards	5	1	1	3	8	14	0.571	3	
5	Distillery	5	0	2	3	3	8	0.375	2	
6	Bangor	5	0	1	4	6	12	0.500	1	

Source: Irish League Archive

=== Section B ===
Pos	Team	Pld	W	D	L	GF	GA	GR	Pts	Result
1	Cliftonville	5	3	1	1	10	6	1.667	7	Advance to final
2	Glentoran	5	3	1	1	9	7	1.286	7	
3	Ballymena United	5	3	0	2	10	8	1.250	6	
4	Crusaders	5	2	1	2	7	6	1.167	5	
5	Coleraine	5	2	0	3	8	8	1.000	4	
6	Larne	5	0	1	4	4	13	0.308	1	

Source: Irish League Archive

== Final ==
22 November 1978

Portadown	2–1 (a.e.t.)	Cliftonville
Gordon 16'; Campbell 99'		Bowers 76'

Windsor Park, Belfast
Referee: Jimmy Haughey
