= 1946–47 Substitute Gold Cup =

Tournament details
- Country: Northern Ireland
- Teams: 8

Final positions
- Champions: Belfast Celtic (4th win)
- Runners-up: Linfield

Tournament statistics
- Matches played: 56
- Goals scored: 255 (4.55 per match)

The 1946–47 Substitute Gold Cup was the seventh and final edition of the Substitute Gold Cup, a cup competition in Northern Irish football. It replaced the Gold Cup, which was suspended due to World War II. This was the final season the Substitute Gold Cup was held, as the Gold Cup resumed the following season.

The tournament was won by Belfast Celtic for the 4th time and 2nd consecutive season.

== Group standings ==
Pos	Team	Pld	W	D	L	GF	GA	GR	Pts	Result
1	Belfast Celtic (C)	14	11	1	2	52	12	4.333	23	Champions
2	Linfield	14	10	2	2	47	13	3.615	22	
3	Glentoran	14	9	0	5	35	26	1.346	18	
4	Distillery	14	7	1	6	37	34	1.088	15	
5	Ballymena United	14	7	1	6	34	34	1.000	15	
6	Derry City	14	4	2	8	17	33	0.515	10	
7	Coleraine	14	4	1	9	23	48	0.479	9	
8	Cliftonville	14	0	0	14	10	55	0.182	0	

Source: Irish League Archive
(C) Champions
