= 1957–58 Gold Cup =

Tournament details
- Country: Northern Ireland
- Teams: 12

Final positions
- Champions: Linfield (17th win)
- Runners-up: Glenavon

Tournament statistics
- Matches played: 13
- Goals scored: 49 (3.77 per match)

The 1957–58 Gold Cup was the 39th edition of the Gold Cup, a cup competition in Northern Irish football.

The tournament was won by Linfield for the 17th time, defeating Glenavon 1–0 in the final at Grosvenor Park.

== Results ==
=== First round ===
Team 1	Score	Team 2
Ballymena United	1–1	Cliftonville
Bangor	0–3	Ards
Coleraine	1–0	Glentoran
Linfield	6–0	Derry City
Crusaders	bye	
Distillery	bye	
Glenavon	bye	
Portadown	bye	

==== Replay ====
Team 1	Score	Team 2
Cliftonville	3–5	Ballymena United

=== Quarter-finals ===
Team 1	Score	Team 2
Ballymena United	3–5	Ards
Coleraine	1–1	Linfield
Crusaders	0–1	Distillery
Glenavon	4–1	Portadown

==== Replays ====
Team 1	Score	Team 2
Linfield	1–0	Coleraine

=== Semi-finals ===
Team 1	Score	Team 2
Glenavon	2–1	Ards
Linfield	7–1	Distillery

=== Final ===
27 November 1957

Linfield	1–0	Glenavon
Stewart 76'	Report

Grosvenor Park, Belfast
