= 1925–26 Gold Cup =

Tournament details
- Country: Northern Ireland
- Teams: 12

Final positions
- Champions: Belfast Celtic (2nd win)
- Runners-up: Cliftonville

Tournament statistics
- Matches played: 11
- Goals scored: 40 (3.64 per match)

The 1925–26 Gold Cup was the 14th edition of the Gold Cup, a cup competition in Northern Irish football.

The tournament was won by Belfast Celtic for the 2nd time, defeating Cliftonville 3–0 in the final at Windsor Park.

== Results ==
=== First round ===
| Team 1 | Score | Team 2 |
|---|---|---|
| Belfast Celtic | 3–2 | Ards |
| Cliftonville | 2–1 | Barn |
| Distillery | 1–4 | Linfield |
| Glenavon | 1–5 | Portadown |
| Larne | 1–0 | Glentoran |
| Newry Town | 3–1 | Queen's Island |

=== Quarter-finals ===
| Team 1 | Score | Team 2 |
|---|---|---|
| Belfast Celtic | 2–1 | Portadown |
| Cliftonville | w/o | |
| Linfield | 2–0 | Larne |
| Newry Town | w/o | |

=== Semi-finals ===
| Team 1 | Score | Team 2 |
|---|---|---|
| Belfast Celtic | 3–2 | Linfield |
| Cliftonville | 2–1 | Newry Town |

=== Final ===
18 March 1926

| Belfast Celtic | 3–0 | Cliftonville |
|---|---|---|
| Beirne (o.g.); McGrillen; Mahood | Report |

Windsor Park, Belfast
Attendance: 15,000
Referee: J.B. Stark
