= 1940–41 Substitute Gold Cup =

Tournament details
- Country: Northern Ireland
- Teams: 8

Final positions
- Champions: Belfast Celtic (1st win)
- Runners-up: Glentoran

Tournament statistics
- Matches played: 56
- Goals scored: 275 (4.91 per match)

The 1940–41 Substitute Gold Cup was the first edition of the Substitute Gold Cup, a cup competition in Northern Irish football. It replaced the Gold Cup, which was suspended due to World War II.

The tournament was won by Belfast Celtic for the 1st time.

== Group standings ==
| Pos | Team | Pld | W | D | L | GF | GA | GR | Pts | Result |
|---|---|---|---|---|---|---|---|---|---|---|
| 1 | Belfast Celtic (C) | 14 | 11 | 2 | 1 | 52 | 17 | 3.059 | 24 | Champions |
| 2 | Glentoran | 14 | 8 | 3 | 3 | 41 | 32 | 1.281 | 19 | |
| 3 | Linfield | 14 | 8 | 1 | 5 | 37 | 34 | 1.088 | 17 | |
| 4 | Distillery | 14 | 5 | 4 | 5 | 31 | 25 | 1.240 | 14 | |
| 5 | Derry City | 14 | 5 | 1 | 8 | 28 | 33 | 0.848 | 11 | |
| 6 | Glenavon | 14 | 5 | 1 | 8 | 24 | 33 | 0.727 | 11 | |
| 7 | Portadown | 14 | 5 | 0 | 9 | 33 | 45 | 0.733 | 10 | |
| 8 | Cliftonville | 14 | 3 | 0 | 11 | 29 | 56 | 0.518 | 6 | |

Source: Irish League Archive
(C) Champions
