= 1981–82 Gold Cup =

Tournament details
- Country: Northern Ireland
- Teams: 12

Final positions
- Champions: Linfield (27th win)
- Runners-up: Ballymena United

Tournament statistics
- Matches played: 31
- Goals scored: 79 (2.55 per match)

The 1981–82 Gold Cup was the 63rd edition of the Gold Cup, a cup competition in Northern Irish football.

The tournament was won by Linfield for the 27th time, defeating Ballymena United 5–4 on penalties in the final at The Oval after the match finished in a 1–1 draw.

== Group standings ==
=== Section A ===
Pos	Team	Pld	W	D	L	GF	GA	GR	Pts	Result
1	Linfield	5	4	0	1	13	2	6.500	8	Advance to final
2	Portadown	5	4	0	1	10	5	2.000	8	
3	Glenavon	5	3	0	2	7	5	1.400	6	
4	Distillery	5	2	0	3	4	8	0.500	4	
5	Ards	5	1	0	4	5	10	0.500	2	
6	Bangor	5	1	0	4	5	14	0.357	2	

Source: Irish League Archive

=== Section B ===
Pos	Team	Pld	W	D	L	GF	GA	GR	Pts	Result
1	Ballymena United	5	3	2	0	7	3	2.333	8	Advance to final
2	Coleraine	5	2	2	1	8	5	1.600	6	
3	Crusaders	5	1	3	1	6	5	1.200	5	
4	Cliftonville	5	1	2	2	6	6	1.000	4	
5	Larne	5	2	0	3	5	8	0.625	4	
6	Glentoran	5	1	1	3	4	9	0.444	3	

Source: Irish League Archive

== Final ==
8 December 1981

Linfield	1–1 (a.e.t.)	Ballymena United
McGaughey 74'	Report	Malone 66'
Penalties
Murray (penalty scored); McGaughey (penalty scored); Crawford (penalty scored); Dornan (penalty scored); Dunlop (penalty scored)	5–4	(penalty scored) Malone; (penalty scored) McCullough; (penalty scored) McQuiston; (penalty scored) Guy; (penalty missed) McAuley

The Oval, Belfast
Attendance: 10,000
Referee: Jack Poucher (Newry)
