= 1982–83 Gold Cup =

Tournament details
- Country: Northern Ireland
- Teams: 12

Final positions
- Champions: Glentoran (8th win)
- Runners-up: Linfield

Tournament statistics
- Matches played: 31
- Goals scored: 98 (3.16 per match)

The 1982–83 Gold Cup was the 64th edition of the Gold Cup, a cup competition in Northern Irish football.

The tournament was won by Glentoran for the 8th time, defeating Linfield 2–0 in the final at The Oval.

== Group standings ==
=== Section A ===
Pos	Team	Pld	W	D	L	GF	GA	GR	Pts	Result
1	Linfield	5	3	2	0	9	4	2.250	8	Advance to final
2	Ards	5	3	2	0	8	4	2.000	8	
3	Bangor	5	3	1	1	9	8	1.125	7	
4	Distillery	5	1	1	3	7	8	0.875	3	
5	Portadown	5	1	0	4	4	8	0.500	2	
6	Glenavon	5	1	0	4	6	11	0.545	2	

Source: Irish League Archive

=== Section B ===
Pos	Team	Pld	W	D	L	GF	GA	GR	Pts	Result
1	Glentoran	5	5	0	0	13	2	6.500	10	Advance to final
2	Ballymena United	5	3	1	1	10	8	1.250	7	
3	Crusaders	5	1	3	1	10	9	1.111	5	
4	Cliftonville	5	2	1	2	7	9	0.778	5	
5	Coleraine	5	1	1	3	8	10	0.800	3	
6	Larne	5	0	0	5	5	15	0.333	0	

Source: Irish League Archive

== Final ==
22 September 1982

Glentoran	2–0	Linfield
Jameson 26', 78'	Report

The Oval, Belfast
Attendance: 10,000
Referee: Hugh Wilson (Belfast)
