= 1964–65 Gold Cup =

Tournament details
- Country: Northern Ireland
- Teams: 12

Final positions
- Champions: Derry City (1st win)
- Runners-up: Crusaders

Tournament statistics
- Matches played: 15
- Goals scored: 61 (4.07 per match)

The 1964–65 Gold Cup was the 46th edition of the Gold Cup, a cup competition in Northern Irish football.

The tournament was won by Derry City for the 1st time, defeating Crusaders 5–2 in the final at Windsor Park.

== Results ==
=== First round ===
Team 1	Score	Team 2
Cliftonville	2–8	Derry City
Crusaders	2–1	Linfield
Distillery	1–1	Glentoran
Portadown	1–2	Ballymena United
Ards	bye	
Bangor	bye	
Coleraine	bye	
Glenavon	bye	

==== Replay ====
Team 1	Score	Team 2
Glentoran	2–1	Distillery

=== Quarter-finals ===
Team 1	Score	Team 2
Ards	2–2	Glenavon
Bangor	1–1	Crusaders
Coleraine	1–1	Ballymena United
Derry City	1–0	Glentoran

==== Replays ====
Team 1	Score	Team 2
Ballymena United	2–4	Coleraine
Crusaders	3–2	Bangor
Glenavon	6–2	Ards

=== Semi-finals ===
Team 1	Score	Team 2
Crusaders	2–1	Coleraine
Derry City	2–0	Glenavon

=== Final ===
10 December 1964

Derry City	5–2	Crusaders
J. Wilson 3', 60'; Coyle 14', 85'; Doherty 65'	Report	L. Wilson 21'; Hale 68'

Windsor Park, Belfast
Referee: Arthur Holland
