= 1968–69 Gold Cup =

Tournament details
- Country: Northern Ireland
- Teams: 12

Final positions
- Champions: Linfield (23rd win)
- Runners-up: Glentoran

Tournament statistics
- Matches played: 14
- Goals scored: 52 (3.71 per match)

The 1968–69 Gold Cup was the 50th edition of the Gold Cup, a cup competition in Northern Irish football.

The tournament was won by Linfield for the 23rd time and 2nd consecutive season, defeating Glentoran 2–1 in the final replay at The Oval after the original final had ended in a 0–0 draw.

== Results ==
=== First round ===
Team 1	Score	Team 2
Ards	1–2	Glenavon
Coleraine	6–1	Crusaders
Derry City	4–1	Portadown
Distillery	3–1	Ballymena United
Bangor	bye	
Cliftonville	bye	
Glentoran	bye	
Linfield	bye	

=== Quarter-finals ===
Team 1	Score	Team 2
Derry City	3–3	Glenavon
Distillery	1–1	Cliftonville
Glentoran	5–0	Coleraine
Linfield	2–0	Bangor

==== Replays ====
Team 1	Score	Team 2
Cliftonville	1–2	Distillery
Glenavon	1–3	Derry City

=== Semi-finals ===
Team 1	Score	Team 2
Glentoran	2–0	Derry City
Linfield	4–2	Distillery

=== Final ===
20 November 1968

Linfield	0–0	Glentoran
	Report

Windsor Park, Belfast
Attendance: 12,000
Referee: Tom McKitterick (Sunderland)

==== Replay ====
4 December 1968

Glentoran	1–2	Linfield
Weatherup 86'	Report	Cathcart 10'; Hamilton 18'

The Oval, Belfast
Attendance: 20,000
Referee: Tom McKitterick (Sunderland)
