= 1972–73 Gold Cup =

Tournament details
- Country: Northern Ireland
- Teams: 12

Final positions
- Champions: Linfield (25th win)
- Runners-up: Portadown

Tournament statistics
- Matches played: 12
- Goals scored: 43 (3.58 per match)

The 1972–73 Gold Cup was the 54th edition of the Gold Cup, a cup competition in Northern Irish football.

The tournament was won by Linfield for the 25th time, defeating Portadown 2–0 in the final at Castlereagh Park.

== Results ==
=== First round ===
Team 1	Score	Team 2
Ards	2–0	Coleraine
Distillery	1–2	Glenavon
Glentoran	0–2	Portadown
Larne	1–2	Crusaders
Ballymena United	bye	
Bangor	bye	
Cliftonville	bye	
Linfield	bye	

=== Quarter-finals ===
Team 1	Score	Team 2
Bangor	4–0	Glenavon
Cliftonville	2–2	Ards
Linfield	3–2	Crusaders
Portadown	5–1	Ballymena United

==== Replay ====
Team 1	Score	Team 2
Ards	3–2	Cliftonville

=== Semi-finals ===
Team 1	Score	Team 2
Linfield	4–1	Ards
Portadown	2–0	Bangor

=== Final ===
26 May 1973

Linfield	2–0	Portadown
Magee 23'; Cochrane 81'	Report

Castlereagh Park, Newtownards
