= 1977–78 Gold Cup =

1999-2024 Gold Cup
Tournament details
- Country: Northern Ireland
- Teams: 12

Final positions
- Champions: Glentoran (40th win)
- Runners-up: Glenavon

Tournament statistics
- Matches played: 31
- Goals scored: 103 (3.32 per match)

The 1977–78 Gold Cup was the 59th edition of the Gold Cup, a cup competition in Northern Irish football.

The tournament was won by Glentoran for the 7th time and 2nd consecutive season, defeating Glenavon 3–1 in the final at the Windsor Park.

== Group standings ==
=== Section A ===
Pos	Team	Pld	W	D	L	GF	GA	GR	Pts	Result
1	Glenavon	5	4	1	0	14	8	1.750	9	Advance to final
2	Bangor	5	2	2	1	10	10	1.000	6	
3	Linfield	5	1	3	1	9	6	1.500	5	
4	Portadown	5	1	2	2	9	9	1.000	4	
5	Ards	5	0	3	2	6	9	0.667	3	
6	Distillery	5	1	1	3	5	11	0.455	3	

Source: Irish League Archive

=== Section B ===
Pos	Team	Pld	W	D	L	GF	GA	GR	Pts	Result
1	Glentoran	5	4	0	1	16	5	3.200	8	Advance to final
2	Ballymena United	5	3	0	2	7	6	1.167	6	
3	Coleraine	5	2	2	1	5	6	0.833	6	
4	Larne	5	2	1	2	8	7	1.143	5	
5	Cliftonville	5	2	1	2	8	10	0.800	5	
6	Crusaders	5	0	0	5	2	12	0.167	0	

Source: Irish League Archive

== Final ==
23 November 1977

Glentoran	3–1	Glenavon
Feeney 33'; Jamison 44'; Dickinson 54'	Report	Malone 77'

Windsor Park, Belfast
Referee: J. Lorimer (Belfast)
