= Gold Cup (Northern Ireland) =

- Organiser(s): Irish Football Association
- Founded: 1911
- Abolished: 2001
- Region: Northern Ireland (1921–2001); Ireland (1911–1921)
- Most championships: Linfield (33 titles)

The Gold Cup is a defunct cup competition which involved competitors from Ireland and, from 1921 onwards, just for Northern Ireland. It was initially run by the New Irish Football Association but later, and mainly, by the Irish Football Association.

The competition was first played in the 1911–12 season after seven of the eight participating clubs left the IFA (only Linfield remained) after a dispute over money and founded the New IFA. This new organisation introduced the cup as the "New Irish Cup". At the end of the season after many discussions, the dissident clubs returned to the IFA and the tournament was not held in 1912-13. However, it was revived by the IFA as the Gold Cup in 1913–14 season. In the seasons 1915–16 to 1918–19 season it was played in a league format. This involved a play-off between the two teams topping the table in the first of these seasons. The competition was last staged in 2000-01.

== Last year of competition ==
The last season that the Gold Cup was competed for was during the 2000-01 season. Glentoran were the victors after defeating Coleraine in the final. It was Glentoran's third Gold Cup victory in as many seasons.

== Format ==
The format for the Gold Cup varied throughout its history, but most commonly it was organised on a knock-out basis.

The format over the years was as follows:

Years	No. of seasons	Format
1911–12 and 1913–15	3	knock-out
1915–1919	4	league
1919–1920	1	knock-out
1920–1923	3	league
1923–1940	17	knock-out
1940–1947	7	league
1947–1976	29	knock-out
1976–1983	7	group system plus final
1983–1985	2	group system plus top-four knock-out
1985–1986	1	league followed by top-four knock-out
1986–1991	5	group system plus top-four knock-out
1991–1999	8	group system plus top-eight knock-out
1999–2001	2	knock-out

In 1915–16, there was a play-off between the top two teams.

== Sponsorship ==
From the late 1970s on the Gold Cup was sponsored by Hennessy, TNT (1984/85-1994/95), Sun Life (1995/96-1996/97) and Nationwide (1997/98-2000/01).

== List of Gold Cup finals ==
Key:

	Scores level after 90 minutes. A replay was required.
(a.e.t.)	Scores level after extra time. A replay was required.
(a.e.t.)	Scores level after 90 minutes. Winner was decided in extra time with no penalty shootout required.
pens.	Scores level after extra time. A penalty shootout was required to determine the winner.

Season	Winner (number of titles)	Score	Runner-up	Venue	Attendance
1911–12	Belfast Celtic (1)	2–0	Glentoran	Grosvenor Park, Belfast	9,500
1913–14	Distillery (1)	0–0	Shelbourne	Shelbourne Park, Dublin
Replay	Distillery (1)	3–2	Shelbourne	Grosvenor Park, Belfast
1914–15	Shelbourne (1)	1–0	Linfield	Solitude, Belfast	18,000
1915–16	Linfield (1)	League format	Distillery	—	—
1916–17	Glentoran (1)	League format	Linfield	—	—
1917–18	Linfield (2)	League format	Glentoran	—	—
1918–19	Linfield (3)	League format	Glentoran	—	—
1919–20	Distillery (2)	3–1	Glentoran	Windsor Park, Belfast
1920–21	Linfield (4)	League format	Glenavon	—	—
1921–22	Linfield (5)	League format	Cliftonville	—	—
1922–23	Cliftonville (1)	League format	Linfield	—	—
1923–24	Linfield (6)	1–0	Distillery	The Oval, Belfast
1924–25	Distillery (3)	2–0	Queen's Island	Celtic Park, Belfast
1925–26	Belfast Celtic (2)	3–0	Cliftonville	Windsor Park, Belfast	15,000
1926–27	Linfield (7)	1–0	Glenavon	Celtic Park, Belfast
1927–28	Linfield (8)	3–2	Belfast Celtic	Grosvenor Park, Belfast
1928–29	Linfield (9)	3–1	Ards	The Oval, Belfast
1929–30	Distillery (4)	3–0	Bangor	Windsor Park, Belfast
1930–31	Linfield (10)	6–1	Belfast Celtic	Grosvenor Park, Belfast
1931–32	Coleraine (1)	3–0	Ballymena	Solitude, Belfast	10,000
1932–33	Cliftonville (2)	2–1	Linfield	Celtic Park, Belfast
1933–34	Portadown (1)	1–0	Glentoran	Solitude, Belfast
1934–35	Belfast Celtic (3)	4–0	Linfield	Grosvenor Park, Belfast	8,000
1935–36	Linfield (11)	3–0	Distillery	Celtic Park, Belfast
1936–37	Linfield (12)	7–2	Derry City	The Oval, Belfast
1937–38	Portadown (2)	2–0	Belfast Celtic	Grosvenor Park, Belfast	12,000
1938–39	Belfast Celtic (4)	2–1	Glenavon	The Oval, Belfast
1939–40	Belfast Celtic (5)	1–0	Linfield	Grosvenor Park, Belfast	10,000
1947–48	Belfast Celtic (6)	2–0	Distillery	Solitude, Belfast
1948–49	Linfield (13)	5–0	Glenavon	Solitude, Belfast
1949–50	Linfield (14)	3–2	Portadown	The Oval, Belfast
1950–51	Linfield (15)	5–1	Glentoran	Solitude, Belfast
1951–52	Glentoran (2)	2–1	Glenavon	Windsor Park, Belfast	15,000
1952–53	Portadown (3)	2–1	Linfield	Seaview, Belfast
1953–54	Ards (1)	2–1	Distillery	Seaview, Belfast	6,000
1954–55	Glenavon (1)	3–2	Linfield	The Oval, Belfast
1955–56	Linfield (16)	3–0	Portadown	Grosvenor Park, Belfast
1956–57	Glenavon (2)	3–1	Derry City	The Oval, Belfast
1957–58	Linfield (17)	1–0	Glenavon	Grosvenor Park, Belfast
1958–59	Coleraine (2)	1–0	Glentoran	Windsor Park, Belfast
1959–60	Linfield (18)	3–2	Portadown	Solitude, Belfast
1960–61	Glentoran (3)	4–2	Linfield	Solitude, Belfast
1961–62	Linfield (19)	4–0	Glentoran	Grosvenor Park, Belfast
1962–63	Glentoran (4)	3–1	Derry City	Windsor Park, Belfast
1963–64	Linfield (20)	2–2	Glentoran	Windsor Park, Belfast
Replay	Linfield (20)	3–2	Glentoran	Windsor Park, Belfast
1964–65	Derry City (1)	5–2	Crusaders	Windsor Park, Belfast
1965–66	Linfield (21)	6–0	Portadown	The Oval, Belfast
1966–67	Glentoran (5)	5–2	Crusaders	Windsor Park, Belfast
1967–68	Linfield (22)	3–2	Ards	The Oval, Belfast
1968–69	Linfield (23)	0–0	Glentoran	Windsor Park, Belfast
Replay	Linfield (23)	2–1	Glentoran	The Oval, Belfast	20,000
1969–70	Coleraine (3)	1–0	Glentoran	Windsor Park, Belfast
1970–71	Linfield (24)	2–1	Glentoran	The Oval, Belfast	15,000
1971–72	Portadown (4)	0–0	Ards	Mourneview Park, Lurgan	5,000
Replay	Portadown (4)	2 – 1 (a.e.t.)	Ards	Mourneview Park, Lurgan	3,500
1972–73	Linfield (25)	2–0	Portadown	Castlereagh Park, Newtownards
1973–74	Ards (2)	4–1	Bangor	The Oval, Belfast
1974–75	Ballymena United (1)	3–2	Glentoran	Windsor Park, Belfast	2,000
1975–76	Coleraine (5)	2–1	Ballymena United	Showgrounds, Ballymena	6,000
1976–77	Glentoran (6)	5–1	Linfield	Windsor Park, Belfast	10,000
1977–78	Glentoran (7)	3–1	Glenavon	Windsor Park, Belfast
1978–79	Portadown (5)	2 – 1 (a.e.t.)	Cliftonville	Windsor Park, Belfast	6,000
1979–80	Linfield (26)	2–1	Ballymena United	Windsor Park, Belfast
1980–81	Cliftonville (3)	3–1	Linfield	Windsor Park, Belfast	10,000
1981–82	Linfield (27)	1 – 1 (a.e.t.) (5 – 4 pens.)	Ballymena United	The Oval, Belfast
1982–83	Glentoran (8)	2–0	Linfield	The Oval, Belfast
1983–84	Linfield (28)	3–1	Glentoran	Windsor Park, Belfast
1984–85	Linfield (29)	1–0	Glentoran	Windsor Park, Belfast
1985–86	Crusaders (1)	3–1	Linfield	The Oval, Belfast
1986–87	Glentoran (9)	3–2	Linfield	The Oval, Belfast
1987–88	Linfield (30)	3–0	Newry Town	The Oval, Belfast	5,000
1988–89	Linfield (31)	1–0	Portadown	The Oval, Belfast
1989–90	Linfield (32)	0 – 0 (a.e.t.)	Portadown	The Oval, Belfast
Replay	Linfield (32)	2–0	Portadown	The Oval, Belfast
1990–91	Glenavon (3)	2–1	Portadown	Windsor Park, Belfast	8,000
1991–92	Glentoran (10)	1–0	Cliftonville	Windsor Park, Belfast	10,000
1992–93	Portadown (6)	1–0	Cliftonville	Windsor Park, Belfast	7,000
1993–94	Distillery (5)	3 – 2 (a.e.t.)	Bangor	Windsor Park, Belfast	750
1994–95	Glentoran (11)	1 – 1 (a.e.t.) (3 – 0 pens.)	Crusaders	Windsor Park, Belfast	2,000
1995–96	Crusaders (2)	1–0	Linfield	The Oval, Belfast
1996–97	Linfield (33)	1–0	Glenavon	The Oval, Belfast	3,253
1997–98	Glenavon (4)	4–2	Coleraine	Windsor Park, Belfast	2,036
1998–99	Glentoran (12)	3–1	Portadown	Windsor Park, Belfast	2,670
1999–00	Glentoran (13)	4–2	Linfield	Windsor Park, Belfast	6,000
2000–01	Glentoran (14)	4–3	Coleraine	Windsor Park, Belfast	3,000

== Performance by club ==
Club	Winners	Runners-up	Winning years	Runners-up years
Linfield	33	14	1915–16, 1917–18, 1918–19, 1920–21, 1921–22, 1923–24, 1926–27, 1927–28, 1928–29, 1930–31, 1935–36, 1936–37, 1948–49, 1949–50, 1950–51, 1955–56, 1957–58, 1959–60, 1961–62, 1963–64, 1965–66, 1967–68, 1968–69, 1970–71, 1972–73, 1979–80, 1981–82, 1983–84, 1984–85, 1987–88, 1988–89, 1989–90, 1996–97	1914–15, 1932–33, 1934–35, 1939–40, 1952–53, 1954–55, 1960–61, 1976–77, 1980–81, 1982–83, 1985–86, 1986–87, 1995–96, 1999–00
Glentoran	14	15	1916–17, 1951–52, 1960–61, 1962–63, 1966–67, 1976–77, 1977–78, 1982–83, 1986–87, 1991–92, 1994–95, 1998–99, 1999–00, 2000–01	1911–12, 1917–18, 1918–19, 1919–20, 1933–34, 1950–51, 1958–59, 1961–62, 1963–64, 1968–69, 1969–70, 1970–71, 1974–75, 1983–84, 1984–85
Portadown	6	9	1933–34, 1937–38, 1952–53, 1971–72, 1978–79, 1992–93	1949–50, 1955–56, 1959–60, 1965–66, 1972–73, 1988–89, 1989–90, 1990–91, 1998–99
Belfast Celtic	6	3	1911–12, 1925–26, 1934–35, 1938–39, 1939–40, 1947–48	1927–28, 1930–31, 1937–38
Distillery	5	6	1913–14, 1919–20, 1924–25, 1929–30, 1993–94	1915–16, 1916–17, 1923–24, 1935–36, 1947–48, 1953–54
Glenavon	4	9	1954–55, 1956–57, 1990–91, 1997–98	1920–21, 1922–23, 1926–27, 1938–39, 1948–49, 1951–52, 1957–58, 1977–78, 1996–97
Coleraine	4	2	1931–32, 1958–59, 1969–70, 1975–76	1997–98, 2000–01
Cliftonville	3	5	1922–23, 1932–33, 1980–81	1921–22, 1925–26, 1978–79, 1991–92, 1992–93
Ards	2	3	1953–54, 1973–74	1928–29, 1967–68, 1971–72
Crusaders	2	3	1985–86, 1995–96	1964–65, 1966–67, 1994–95
Derry City	1	3	1964–65	1936–37, 1956–57, 1962–63
Ballymena United	1	3	1974–75	1975–76, 1979–80, 1981–82
Shelbourne	1	1	1914–15	1913–14
Bangor	0	3	—	1929–30, 1973–74, 1993–94
Queen's Island	0	1	—	1924–25
Ballymena	0	1	—	1931–32
Newry Town	0	1	—	1987–88

== Substitute Gold Cup ==
Between the 1940/41 and 1946/47 seasons the Gold Cup was competed for by the Northern Regional League Clubs and known as the "Substitute Gold Cup".

Season	Winner (number of titles)	Score	Runner-up
1940–41	Belfast Celtic (1)	League format	Glentoran
1941–42	Glentoran (1)	League format	Distillery
1942–43	Linfield (1)	League format	Belfast Celtic
1943–44	Belfast Celtic (2)	League format	Distillery
1944–45	Linfield (2)	League format	Distillery
1945–46	Belfast Celtic (3)	League format	Linfield
1946–47	Belfast Celtic (4)	League format	Linfield

=== Performance by club ===
Club	Winners	Runners-up	Winning years	Runners-up years
Belfast Celtic	4	1	1940–41, 1943–44, 1945–46, 1946–47	1942–43
Linfield	2	2	1942–43, 1944–45	1945–46, 1946–47
Glentoran	1	1	1941–42	1940–41
Distillery	0	3	—	1941–42, 1943–44, 1944–45
