= 1918–19 Gold Cup =

Tournament details
- Country: Ireland
- Teams: 6

Final positions
- Champions: Linfield (3rd win)
- Runners-up: Belfast Celtic

Tournament statistics
- Matches played: 15
- Goals scored: 38 (2.53 per match)

The 1918–19 Gold Cup was the 7th edition of the Gold Cup, a cup competition in Irish football.

The tournament was won by Linfield for the 3rd time.

== Group standings ==
| Pos | Team | Pld | W | D | L | GF | GA | GR | Pts | Result |
|---|---|---|---|---|---|---|---|---|---|---|
| 1 | Linfield (C) | 5 | 3 | 2 | 0 | 11 | 3 | 3.667 | 8 | Champions |
| 2 | Belfast Celtic | 5 | 2 | 3 | 0 | 7 | 2 | 3.500 | 7 | |
| 3 | Glentoran | 5 | 2 | 1 | 2 | 6 | 3 | 2.000 | 5 | |
| 4 | Belfast United | 5 | 1 | 2 | 2 | 3 | 8 | 0.375 | 4 | |
| 5 | Distillery | 5 | 0 | 3 | 2 | 5 | 9 | 0.556 | 3 | |
| 6 | Cliftonville | 5 | 1 | 1 | 3 | 6 | 13 | 0.462 | 3 | |

Source: Irish League Archive
(C) Champions

== Results ==
| Home \ Away | BCE | BUT | CLI | DIS | GLT | LIN |
|---|---|---|---|---|---|---|
| Belfast Celtic | | 4–1 | | | 0–0 | 0–0 |
| Belfast United | | | | | | |
| Cliftonville | 0–2 | 1–2 | | 3–3 | | 1–6 |
| Distillery | 1–1 | 0–0 | | | | |
| Glentoran | | 3–0 | 0–1 | 2–0 | | |
| Linfield | | 0–0 | | 3–1 | 2–1 | |

Source: Irish League Archive
Legend: Blue = home team win; Yellow = draw; Red = away team win.
