= 1953–54 Gold Cup =

Tournament details
- Country: Northern Ireland
- Teams: 12

Final positions
- Champions: Ards (1st win)
- Runners-up: Distillery

Tournament statistics
- Matches played: 13
- Goals scored: 42 (3.23 per match)

The 1953–54 Gold Cup was the 35th edition of the Gold Cup, a cup competition in Northern Irish football.

The tournament was won by Ards for the 1st time, defeating Distillery 2–1 in the final at Seaview. Both the Ards manager George Eastham Sr. and his son George Eastham played in the final (with Eastham Sr. scoring).

== Results ==
=== First round ===
| Team 1 | Score | Team 2 |
|---|---|---|
| Ards | 5–4 | Cliftonville |
| Bangor | 1–2 | Ballymena United |
| Glentoran | 3–1 | Glenavon |
| Linfield | 0–0 | Derry City |
| Distillery | bye | |
| Coleraine | bye | |
| Portadown | bye | |
| Crusaders | bye | |

==== Replay ====
| Team 1 | Score | Team 2 |
|---|---|---|
| Derry City | 0–0 | Linfield |

==== Second replay ====
| Team 1 | Score | Team 2 |
|---|---|---|
| Linfield | 7–0 | Derry City |

=== Quarter-finals ===
| Team 1 | Score | Team 2 |
|---|---|---|
| Ballymena United | 1–4 | Glentoran |
| Distillery | 1–0 | Coleraine |
| Linfield | 0–2 | Ards |
| Portadown | 1–0 | Crusaders |

=== Semi-finals ===
| Team 1 | Score | Team 2 |
|---|---|---|
| Ards | 3–1 | Portadown |
| Distillery | 2–1 | Glentoran |

=== Final ===
15 May 1954

| Ards | 2–1 | Distillery |
|---|---|---|
| Walker 50'; Eastham Sr. 65' | Report | Johnson 18' |

Seaview, Belfast
Referee: G. Gibson (Manchester)
