= 1971–72 Gold Cup =

Tournament details
- Country: Northern Ireland
- Teams: 12

Final positions
- Champions: Portadown (4th win)
- Runners-up: Ards

Tournament statistics
- Matches played: 16
- Goals scored: 53 (3.31 per match)

The 1971–72 Gold Cup was the 53rd edition of the Gold Cup, a cup competition in Northern Irish football.

The tournament was won by Portadown for the 4th time, defeating Ards 2–1 in the final replay at Mourneview Park. after the original final finished in a 0–0 draw.

== Results ==
=== First round ===
Team 1	Score	Team 2
Bangor	2–4	Portadown
Cliftonville	0–3	Linfield
Crusaders	1–1	Coleraine
Derry City	0–0	Ballymena United
Ards	bye	
Distillery	bye	
Glenavon	bye	
Glentoran	bye	

==== Replays ====
Team 1	Score	Team 2
Ballymena United	4–4	Derry City
Coleraine	4–0	Crusaders

==== Second replay ====
Team 1	Score	Team 2
Ballymena United	2–1	Derry City

=== Quarter-finals ===
Team 1	Score	Team 2
Coleraine	2–2	Distillery
Glenavon	0–5	Ards
Linfield	0–0	Glentoran
Portadown	3–1	Ballymena United

==== Replay ====
Team 1	Score	Team 2
Distillery	1–0	Coleraine
Glentoran	3–0	Linfield

=== Semi-finals ===
Team 1	Score	Team 2
Ards	3–1	Distillery
Portadown	1–0	Glentoran

=== Final ===
19 May 1972

Portadown	0–0	Ards
	Report

Mourneview Park, Lurgan
Attendance: 5,000
Referee: Malcolm Moffatt (Banbridge)

==== Replay ====
24 May 1972

Portadown	2–1 (a.e.t.)	Ards
Fleming 100'; McGowan 113'	Report	McAvoy 111'

Mourneview Park, Lurgan
Attendance: 3,500
Referee: Malcolm Moffatt (Banbridge)
