= 1937–38 Gold Cup =

Tournament details
- Country: Northern Ireland
- Teams: 14

Final positions
- Champions: Portadown (2nd win)
- Runners-up: Belfast Celtic

Tournament statistics
- Matches played: 15
- Goals scored: 62 (4.13 per match)

The 1937–38 Gold Cup was the 26th edition of the Gold Cup, a cup competition in Northern Irish football.

The tournament was won by Portadown for the 2nd time, defeating Belfast Celtic 2–0 in the final at Grosvenor Park.

== Results ==
=== First round ===
Team 1	Score	Team 2
Belfast Celtic	3–0	Ballymena United
Cliftonville	1–5	Coleraine
Derry City	4–3	Glenavon
Larne	4–1	Ards
Linfield	0–1	Glentoran
Newry Town	2–2	Bangor
Portadown	1–0	Distillery

==== Replay ====
Team 1	Score	Team 2
Bangor	0–3	Newry Town

=== Quarter-finals ===
Team 1	Score	Team 2
Belfast Celtic	5–0	Glentoran
Derry City	4–2	Coleraine
Portadown	3–2	Larne
Newry Town	bye	

=== Semi-finals ===
Team 1	Score	Team 2
Belfast Celtic	7–0	Newry Town
Portadown	2–2	Derry City

==== Replay ====
Team 1	Score	Team 2
Portadown	2–1	Derry City

=== Final ===
1 December 1937

Portadown	2–0	Belfast Celtic
Gamble 15'; G. Cochrane 75'	Report

Grosvenor Park, Belfast
Attendance: 12,000
Referee: H. Nattrass (Durham)
