= 1973–74 Gold Cup =

Tournament details
- Country: Northern Ireland
- Teams: 12

Final positions
- Champions: Ards (2nd win)
- Runners-up: Bangor

Tournament statistics
- Matches played: 11
- Goals scored: 38 (3.45 per match)

The 1973–74 Gold Cup was the 55th edition of the Gold Cup, a cup competition in Northern Irish football.

The tournament was won by Ards for the 2nd time, defeating Bangor 4–1 in the final at The Oval.

== Results ==
=== First round ===
Team 1	Score	Team 2
Crusaders	6–0	Coleraine
Glenavon	0–2	Larne
Glentoran	1–0	Distillery
Linfield	3–1	Portadown
Ards	bye	
Ballymena United	bye	
Bangor	bye	
Cliftonville	bye	

=== Quarter-finals ===
Team 1	Score	Team 2
Ballymena United	1–1 (9–8 p)	Linfield
Cliftonville	1–6	Ards
Glentoran	3–1	Crusaders
Larne	1–4	Bangor

=== Semi-finals ===
Team 1	Score	Team 2
Glentoran	1–1 (4-5 p)	Ards
Bangor	0–0 (3–0 p)	Ballymena United

=== Final ===
1 November 1973

Ards	4–1	Bangor
Guy 22', 38'; McAteer 58'; Cathcart 87'	Report	Reid 47'

The Oval, Belfast
Referee: Redmond McFadden (Derry)
