= 1955–56 Gold Cup =

Tournament details
- Country: Northern Ireland
- Teams: 12

Final positions
- Champions: Linfield (16th win)
- Runners-up: Portadown

Tournament statistics
- Matches played: 11
- Goals scored: 50 (4.55 per match)

The 1955–56 Gold Cup was the 37th edition of the Gold Cup, a cup competition in Northern Irish football.

The tournament was won by Linfield for the 16th time, defeating Portadown 3–0 in the final at Grosvenor Park.

== Results ==
=== First round ===
Team 1	Score	Team 2
Ballymena United	0–3	Linfield
Coleraine	0–2	Glenavon
Distillery	1–3	Portadown
Glentoran	4–1	Crusaders
Ards	bye	
Bangor	bye	
Cliftonville	bye	
Derry City	bye	

=== Quarter-finals ===
Team 1	Score	Team 2
Ards	1–3	Portadown
Cliftonville	0–3	Bangor
Glentoran	5–3	Derry City
Linfield	4–1	Glenavon

=== Semi-finals ===
Team 1	Score	Team 2
Linfield	4–2	Glentoran
Portadown	5–2	Bangor

=== Final ===
7 December 1955

Linfield	3–0	Portadown
Dickson 12', 66'; Richardson 53'	Report

Grosvenor Park, Belfast
Attendance: 12,000
Referee: E. Seymour (Wakefield)
