= 1952–53 Gold Cup =

Tournament details
- Country: Northern Ireland
- Teams: 12

Final positions
- Champions: Portadown (3rd win)
- Runners-up: Linfield

Tournament statistics
- Matches played: 14
- Goals scored: 51 (3.64 per match)

The 1952–53 Gold Cup was the 34th edition of the Gold Cup, a cup competition in Northern Irish football.

The tournament was won by Portadown for the 3rd time, defeating Linfield 2–1 in the final at Seaview.

== Results ==
=== First round ===
Team 1	Score	Team 2
Ards	1–1	Bangor
Crusaders	5–2	Coleraine
Glenavon	3–3	Glentoran
Portadown	3–1	Derry City
Ballymena United	bye	
Cliftonville	bye	
Distillery	bye	
Linfield	bye	

==== Replays ====
Team 1	Score	Team 2
Bangor	2–5	Ards
Glenavon	1–1	Glentoran

==== Second replay ====
Team 1	Score	Team 2
Glenavon	3–1	Glentoran

=== Quarter-finals ===
Team 1	Score	Team 2
Ballymena United	0–1	Ards
Cliftonville	1–2	Glentoran
Linfield	2–1	Crusaders
Portadown	3–0	Distillery

=== Semi-finals ===
Team 1	Score	Team 2
Linfield	3–2 (a.e.t.)	Ards
Portadown	1–0	Glentoran

=== Final ===
19 May 1953

Portadown	2–1	Linfield
Russell 79' (o.g.); Punton 81'	Report	Lunn 39'

Seaview, Belfast
