= 1915–16 Gold Cup =

Tournament details
- Country: Ireland
- Teams: 6

Final positions
- Champions: Linfield (1st win)
- Runners-up: Distillery

Tournament statistics
- Matches played: 16
- Goals scored: 48 (3 per match)

The 1915–16 Gold Cup was the 4th edition of the Gold Cup, a cup competition in Irish football.

The tournament was won by Linfield for the 1st time, defeating Distillery 2–0 in a test match after both teams had finished level on points in the league table.

== Group standings ==
Pos	Team	Pld	W	D	L	GF	GA	GR	Pts	Result
1	Distillery	5	3	2	0	10	3	3.333	8	Advance to test match
2	Linfield	5	3	2	0	16	4	4.000	8	Advance to test match
3	Glentoran	5	1	3	1	6	5	1.200	5	
4	Cliftonville	5	2	1	2	5	11	0.455	5	
5	Belfast United	5	0	3	2	5	10	0.500	3	
6	Glenavon	5	0	1	4	4	13	0.308	1	

Source: Irish League Archive

== Results ==
=== Group ===
All matches were played at neutral locations.

- Grosvenor Park:
  - Glenavon 1–3 Cliftonville
  - Linfield 4–1 Glenavon
  - Linfield 3–1 Belfast United
  - Linfield 1–1 Glentoran
- The Oval:
  - Linfield 1–1 Distillery
  - Cliftonville 0–0 Belfast United
  - Linfield 7–0 Cliftonville
  - Belfast United 1–1 Glenavon
- Solitude:
  - Glentoran 0–0 Distillery
  - Belfast United 1–4 Distillery
  - Distillery 2–0 Glenavon
- Windsor Park:
  - Glentoran 2–2 Belfast United
  - Glentoran 3–1 Glenavon
  - Glentoran 0–1 Cliftonville
  - Distillery 3–1 Cliftonville

=== Test match ===
17 May 1916

Linfield	2–0	Distillery
Rollo (pen.); Nixon	Report

The Oval, Belfast
Referee: T. Dougary (Scotland)
