= 1948–49 Gold Cup =

Tournament details
- Country: Northern Ireland
- Teams: 12

Final positions
- Champions: Linfield (13th win)
- Runners-up: Glenavon

Tournament statistics
- Matches played: 15
- Goals scored: 51 (3.4 per match)

The 1948–49 Gold Cup was the 30th edition of the Gold Cup, a cup competition in Northern Irish football.

The tournament was won by Linfield for the 13th time, defeating Glenavon 5–0 in the final at Solitude.

== Results ==
=== First round ===
Team 1	Score	Team 2
Ards	0–2	Ballymena United
Belfast Celtic	2–1	Glentoran
Derry City	0–4	Glenavon
Portadown	5–5	Cliftonville
Bangor	bye	
Coleraine	bye	
Distillery	bye	
Linfield	bye	

==== Replay ====
Team 1	Score	Team 2
Cliftonville	2–1	Portadown

=== Quarter-finals ===
Team 1	Score	Team 2
Bangor	2–5	Linfield
Cliftonville	0–1	Belfast Celtic
Distillery	0–0	Coleraine
Glenavon	1–1	Ballymena United

==== Replays ====
Team 1	Score	Team 2
Ballymena United	2–4	Glenavon
Coleraine	0–0	Distillery

==== Second replay ====
Team 1	Score	Team 2
Distillery	0–1	Coleraine

=== Semi-finals ===
Team 1	Score	Team 2
Glenavon	2–1	Belfast Celtic
Linfield	3–1	Coleraine

=== Final ===
24 November 1948

Linfield	5–0	Glenavon
Thompson 3'; Simpson 16', 26', 58'; McDowell 40'	Report

Solitude, Belfast
Attendance: 18,000
