= 1913–14 Gold Cup =

Tournament details
- Country: Ireland
- Teams: 7

Final positions
- Champions: Distillery (1st win)
- Runners-up: Shelbourne

Tournament statistics
- Matches played: 6
- Goals scored: 17 (2.83 per match)

The 1913–14 Gold Cup was the 2nd edition of the Gold Cup, a cup competition in Irish football. It was the first staging of the competition under the name of the Gold Cup - the previous edition in 1911–12 was played under the name of the New Irish Cup.

The tournament was won by Distillery for the 1st time, defeating Shelbourne 3–2 in the final replay at Grosvenor Park, after the original final match ended in a 0–0 draw at Dalymount Park.

== Results ==
=== Quarter-finals ===
Team 1	Score	Team 2
Belfast Celtic	2–1	Cliftonville
Distillery	w/o	Glentoran
Linfield	2–1	Glenavon
Shelbourne	bye	

=== Semi-finals ===
Team 1	Score	Team 2
Distillery	3–1	Linfield
Shelbourne	2–0	Belfast Celtic

=== Final ===
29 April 1914

Shelbourne	0–0	Distillery
	Report

Dalymount Park, Dublin

==== Replay ====
6 May 1914

Distillery	3–2	Shelbourne
Milne; Atkins; Burnison (pen.)	Report	Grant

Grosvenor Park, Belfast
Referee: George Jenkins (Belfast)
