= 1917–18 Gold Cup =

Tournament details
- Country: Ireland
- Teams: 6

Final positions
- Champions: Linfield (2nd win)
- Runners-up: Glentoran

Tournament statistics
- Matches played: 15
- Goals scored: 38 (2.53 per match)

The 1917–18 Gold Cup was the 6th edition of the Gold Cup, a cup competition in Irish football.

The tournament was won by Linfield for the 2nd time.

== Group standings ==
Pos	Team	Pld	W	D	L	GF	GA	GR	Pts	Result
1	Linfield (C)	5	4	1	0	14	1	14.000	9	Champions
2	Glentoran	5	2	2	1	7	5	1.400	6	
3	Distillery	5	2	1	2	7	9	0.778	5	
4	Belfast United	5	1	2	2	6	7	0.857	4	
5	Glenavon	5	1	2	2	3	10	0.300	4	
6	Cliftonville	5	0	2	3	1	6	0.167	2	

Source: Irish League Archive
(C) Champions

== Results ==
Home \ Away	BEL	CLI	DIS	GLA	GLT	LIN
Belfast United				0–0	2–2	1–2
Cliftonville	0–1				0–1	
Distillery	3–2	1–1		2–1		
Glenavon		0–0			2–1	
Glentoran			3–1			0–0
Linfield		3–0	2–0	7–0		

Source: Irish League Archive
Legend: Blue = home team win; Yellow = draw; Red = away team win.
