= 1944–45 Substitute Gold Cup =

Tournament details
- Country: Northern Ireland
- Teams: 6

Final positions
- Champions: Linfield (2nd win)
- Runners-up: Distillery

Tournament statistics
- Matches played: 30
- Goals scored: 157 (5.23 per match)

The 1944–45 Substitute Gold Cup was the fifth edition of the Substitute Gold Cup, a cup competition in Northern Irish football. It replaced the Gold Cup, which was suspended due to World War II.

The tournament was won by Linfield for the 2nd time.

== Group standings ==
Pos	Team	Pld	W	D	L	GF	GA	GR	Pts	Result
1	Linfield (C)	10	8	1	1	36	10	3.600	17	Champions
2	Distillery	10	6	1	3	25	18	1.389	13	
3	Belfast Celtic	10	5	1	4	24	21	1.143	11	
4	Glentoran	10	3	2	5	21	29	0.724	8	
5	Derry City	10	3	1	6	32	42	0.762	7	
6	Cliftonville	10	2	0	8	19	37	0.514	4	

Source: Irish League Archive
(C) Champions
