= 1949–50 Gold Cup =

Tournament details
- Country: Northern Ireland
- Teams: 12

Final positions
- Champions: Linfield (14th win)
- Runners-up: Portadown

Tournament statistics
- Matches played: 14
- Goals scored: 45 (3.21 per match)

The 1949–50 Gold Cup was the 31st edition of the Gold Cup, a cup competition in Northern Irish football.

The tournament was won by Linfield for the 14th time and 2nd consecutive season, defeating Portadown 3–2 in the final at The Oval.

== Results ==
=== First round ===
Team 1	Score	Team 2
Ballymena United	1–1	Derry City
Crusaders	1–1	Portadown
Distillery	1–0	Coleraine
Glentoran	5–0	Cliftonville
Ards	bye	
Bangor	bye	
Glenavon	bye	
Linfield	bye	

==== Replay ====
Team 1	Score	Team 2
Derry City	1–4	Ballymena United
Portadown	3–1	Crusaders

=== Quarter-finals ===
Team 1	Score	Team 2
Distillery	1–0	Ballymena United
Glenavon	3–0	Ards
Glentoran	1–1	Linfield
Portadown	2–0	Bangor

==== Replays ====
Team 1	Score	Team 2
Linfield	6–0	Glentoran

=== Semi-finals ===
Team 1	Score	Team 2
Linfield	3–1	Distillery
Portadown	2–1	Glenavon

=== Final ===
26 October 1949

Linfield	3–2	Portadown
Thompson (pen.); Dickson	Report	Russell (pen.); Jackson

The Oval, Belfast
Attendance: 6,500
