= 1943–44 Substitute Gold Cup =

Tournament details
- Country: Northern Ireland
- Teams: 6

Final positions
- Champions: Belfast Celtic (2nd win)
- Runners-up: Distillery

Tournament statistics
- Matches played: 30
- Goals scored: 122 (4.07 per match)

The 1943–44 Substitute Gold Cup was the fourth edition of the Substitute Gold Cup, a cup competition in Northern Irish football. It replaced the Gold Cup, which was suspended due to World War II.

The tournament was won by Belfast Celtic for the 2nd time.

== Group standings ==
| Pos | Team | Pld | W | D | L | GF | GA | GR | Pts | Result |
|---|---|---|---|---|---|---|---|---|---|---|
| 1 | Belfast Celtic (C) | 10 | 7 | 1 | 2 | 32 | 10 | 3.200 | 15 | Champions |
| 2 | Distillery | 10 | 5 | 2 | 3 | 22 | 17 | 1.294 | 12 | |
| 3 | Glentoran | 10 | 5 | 2 | 3 | 19 | 16 | 1.188 | 12 | |
| 4 | Linfield | 10 | 5 | 1 | 4 | 21 | 14 | 1.500 | 11 | |
| 5 | Derry City | 10 | 3 | 0 | 7 | 16 | 35 | 0.457 | 6 | |
| 6 | Cliftonville | 10 | 2 | 0 | 8 | 12 | 30 | 0.400 | 4 | |

Source: Irish League Archive
(C) Champions
