= 1963–64 Gold Cup =

Tournament details
- Country: Northern Ireland
- Teams: 12

Final positions
- Champions: Linfield (20th win)
- Runners-up: Glentoran

Tournament statistics
- Matches played: 18
- Goals scored: 65 (3.61 per match)

The 1963–64 Gold Cup was the 45th edition of the Gold Cup, a cup competition in Northern Irish football.

The tournament was won by Linfield for the 20th time, defeating Glentoran 3–2 in the final replay at Windsor Park after the original final finished in a 2–2 draw.

== Results ==
=== First round ===
Team 1	Score	Team 2
Ards	2–6	Linfield
Ballymena United	1–1	Cliftonville
Bangor	0–3	Distillery
Crusaders	2–0	Portadown
Coleraine	bye	
Derry City	bye	
Glenavon	bye	
Glentoran	bye	

==== Replay ====
Team 1	Score	Team 2
Cliftonville	0–1	Ballymena United

=== Quarter-finals ===
Team 1	Score	Team 2
Ballymena United	3–3	Glentoran
Coleraine	1–1	Crusaders
Derry City	1–0	Glenavon
Distillery	1–3	Linfield

==== Replays ====
Team 1	Score	Team 2
Crusaders	3–1	Coleraine
Glentoran	2–2	Ballymena United

==== Second replay ====
Team 1	Score	Team 2
Ballymena United	1–4	Glentoran

=== Semi-finals ===
Team 1	Score	Team 2
Derry City	3–3	Glentoran
Linfield	0–0	Crusaders

==== Replays ====
Team 1	Score	Team 2
Glentoran	2–0	Derry City
Linfield	4–2	Crusaders

=== Final ===
15 January 1964

Linfield	2–2	Glentoran
Craig 63', 73'	Report	Pavis 30'; Byrne 90'

Windsor Park, Belfast

==== Replay ====
12 February 1964

Linfield	3–2	Glentoran
Scott 25' (pen.); Craig 35', 66'	Report	Thompson 8'; Pavis 55'

Windsor Park, Belfast
Referee: K. E. Walker (Blackpool)
