= Dennis Guy =

Northern Irish footballer (1944–2022)

Personal information
- Date of birth: 16 September 1944
- Place of birth: Portadown, Northern Ireland
- Date of death: 9 September 2022 (aged 77)
- Place of death: Portadown, Northern Ireland
- Position: Forward

Youth career
- 1960: Portadown Tech
- 1960–1963: Linfield Swifts

Senior career*
Years	Team	Apps	(Gls)
1961–1963	Linfield	20	(11)
1963–1975	Glenavon	373	(295)
1972–1974	Ards		
1976	Glentoran		

International career
1965–1969	Northern Ireland B	8	(5)
- * Club domestic league appearances and goals

Dennis Guy (16 September 1944 – 9 September 2022) was a Northern Irish footballer who played as a forward. Throughout his 15-year career, he scored 504 goals in 631 games.

== Club career ==
=== Linfield ===
Guy started off his senior football at Linfield Swifts and with 97 goals from 104 games his first team debut was nearing. On 11 November 1961, at 17 years of age, Guy made his senior Linfield debut in a 4–0 City Cup win over Crusaders. This was Linfield's famous "Seven Trophy Season". Guy would not be awarded another first team appearance in that season, still making appearances for the Swifts. He scored his first senior goal in a 3–0 win over Glentoran in September 1962, and claimed a hattrick in the Irish Cup semi-final win over Crusaders.

Guy left Linfield with a first-team tally of 11 goals in 20 games.

=== Glenavon ===
Guy joined Glenavon in 1964 from Linfield, after coach Jimmy McAlinden made a deal which saw Glenavon Reserves goalkeeper Sammy Cowan go the other way.

He then went on to become the club's second-highest goalscorer behind Jimmy Jones with 295 goals in 373 appearances and was the club's leading goalscorer in eight successive seasons, between 1964–65 and 1971–72. Guy is the only Glenavon player ever to score six goals in a league game, which he achieved against Glentoran at Mourneview Park on Christmas Eve, 1966.

== International career ==
Guy never officially made an appearance for Northern Ireland's national first team, but on eight occasions represented the Northern Ireland B team, over the course of four years and scored five goals.

== Honours ==
Glenavon

- Irish Cup runner-up: 1964–65

Ards

- Irish Cup: 1973–74
- Gold Cup: 1973–74
- Ulster Cup: 1973–74
- Blaxnit Cup: 1973–74

Individual

- Northern Irish First Division top scorer: 1963–64 (19 goals)
