= 1962–63 Gold Cup =

Tournament details
- Country: Northern Ireland
- Teams: 12

Final positions
- Champions: Glentoran (4th win)
- Runners-up: Derry City

Tournament statistics
- Matches played: 15
- Goals scored: 48 (3.2 per match)

The 1962–63 Gold Cup was the 44th edition of the Gold Cup, a cup competition in Northern Irish football.

The tournament was won by Glentoran for the 4th time, defeating Derry City 4–0 in the final at Windsor Park.

== Results ==
=== First round ===
| Team 1 | Score | Team 2 |
|---|---|---|
| Coleraine | 3–3 | Bangor |
| Crusaders | 3–4 | Cliftonville |
| Derry City | 1–0 | Portadown |
| Glentoran | 1–0 | Linfield |
| Ards | bye | |
| Ballymena United | bye | |
| Distillery | bye | |
| Glenavon | bye | |

==== Replays ====
| Team 1 | Score | Team 2 |
|---|---|---|
| Coleraine | 1–1 | Bangor |
| Linfield | 2–0 | Derry City |

==== Second replay ====
| Team 1 | Score | Team 2 |
|---|---|---|
| Coleraine | 2–0 | Bangor |

=== Quarter-finals ===
| Team 1 | Score | Team 2 |
|---|---|---|
| Cliftonville | 0–2 | Ballymena United |
| Derry City | 2–1 | Ards |
| Distillery | 2–1 | Coleraine |
| Glentoran | 1–1 | Glenavon |

==== Replay ====
| Team 1 | Score | Team 2 |
|---|---|---|
| Glenavon | 2–2 | Glentoran |

==== Second replay ====
| Team 1 | Score | Team 2 |
|---|---|---|
| Glentoran | 2–1 | Glenavon |

=== Semi-finals ===
| Team 1 | Score | Team 2 |
|---|---|---|
| Derry City | 5–0 | Ballymena United |
| Glentoran | 2–1 | Distillery |

=== Final ===
14 March 1963

| Glentoran | 3–1 | Derry City |
|---|---|---|
| Hume 70' (pen.); Pavis 83', 85' | Report | Queen 71' |

Windsor Park, Belfast
