= 1958–59 Gold Cup =

Tournament details
- Country: Northern Ireland
- Teams: 12

Final positions
- Champions: Coleraine (2nd win)
- Runners-up: Glentoran

Tournament statistics
- Matches played: 12
- Goals scored: 51 (4.25 per match)

The 1958–59 Gold Cup was the 40th edition of the Gold Cup, a cup competition in Northern Irish football.

The tournament was won by Coleraine for the 2nd time, defeating Glentoran 1–0 in the final at Windsor Park.

== Results ==
=== First round ===
Team 1	Score	Team 2
Ards	0–1	Cliftonville
Ballymena United	3–4	Glenavon
Coleraine	3–2	Distillery
Linfield	2–1	Bangor
Crusaders	bye	
Derry City	bye	
Glentoran	bye	
Portadown	bye	

=== Quarter-finals ===
Team 1	Score	Team 2
Cliftonville	0–3	Coleraine
Glentoran	4–2	Glenavon
Linfield	5–1	Crusaders
Portadown	0–0	Derry City

==== Replays ====
Team 1	Score	Team 2
Derry City	5–3	Portadown

=== Semi-finals ===
Team 1	Score	Team 2
Coleraine	3–1	Derry City
Glentoran	5–2	Linfield

=== Final ===
18 November 1958

Coleraine	1–0	Glentoran
Crossan 16'	Report

Windsor Park, Belfast
Attendance: 10,000
Referee: J. Jobling (Morecambe)
