= 1934–35 Gold Cup =

Tournament details
- Country: Northern Ireland
- Teams: 14

Final positions
- Champions: Belfast Celtic (3rd win)
- Runners-up: Linfield

Tournament statistics
- Matches played: 15
- Goals scored: 66 (4.4 per match)

The 1934–35 Gold Cup was the 23rd edition of the Gold Cup, a cup competition in Northern Irish football.

The tournament was won by Belfast Celtic for the 3rd time, defeating Linfield 4–0 in the final at Grosvenor Park.

== Results ==
=== First round ===
Team 1	Score	Team 2
Ards	5–2	Cliftonville
Ballymena United	2–4	Linfield
Bangor	2–2	Newry Town
Belfast Celtic	2–1	Larne
Coleraine	2–1	Distillery
Glenavon	3–0	Glentoran
Portadown	4–3	Derry City

==== Replay ====
Team 1	Score	Team 2
Newry Town	3–4	Bangor

=== Quarter-finals ===
Team 1	Score	Team 2
Bangor	2–2	Portadown
Belfast Celtic	1–0	Glenavon
Coleraine	0–3	Linfield
Ards	bye	

==== Replay ====
Team 1	Score	Team 2
Portadown	4–1	Bangor

=== Semi-finals ===
Team 1	Score	Team 2
Belfast Celtic	3–1	Ards
Linfield	3–2	Portadown

=== Final ===
5 December 1934

Belfast Celtic	4–0	Linfield
Geoghegan 16', 40'; Martin 80', 83'	Report

Grosvenor Park, Belfast
Attendance: 8,000
Referee: T. Bentley (Manchester)
