= 1974–75 Gold Cup =

Tournament details
- Country: Northern Ireland
- Teams: 12

Final positions
- Champions: Ballymena United (1st win)
- Runners-up: Glentoran

Tournament statistics
- Matches played: 11
- Goals scored: 41 (3.73 per match)

The 1974–75 Gold Cup was the 56th edition of the Gold Cup, a cup competition in Northern Irish football.

The tournament was won by Ballymena United for the 1st time, defeating Glentoran 3–2 in the final at Windsor Park.

== Results ==
=== First round ===
Team 1	Score	Team 2
Coleraine	2–0	Ards
Distillery	1–4	Crusaders
Linfield	3–1	Glenavon
Portadown	0–1	Larne
Ballymena United	bye	
Bangor	bye	
Cliftonville	bye	
Glentoran	bye	

=== Quarter-finals ===
Team 1	Score	Team 2
Ballymena United	2–0	Linfield
Bangor	6–0	Cliftonville
Coleraine	1–1 (5–4 p)	Larne
Glentoran	2–1	Crusaders

=== Semi-finals ===
Team 1	Score	Team 2
Ballymena United	5–1	Coleraine
Bangor	1–3	Glentoran

=== Final ===
13 November 1974

Ballymena United	3–2	Glentoran
Brown 42'; Orr 58'; McFall 75'	Report	Feeney 45'; Caskey 50'

Windsor Park, Belfast
Attendance: 5,000
Referee: Redmond McFadden (Derry)
