= 1920–21 Gold Cup =

Tournament details
- Country: Ireland
- Teams: 5

Final positions
- Champions: Linfield (4th win)
- Runners-up: Glenavon

Tournament statistics
- Matches played: 20
- Goals scored: 56 (2.8 per match)

The 1920–21 Gold Cup was the 9th edition of the Gold Cup, a cup competition in Irish football.

The tournament was won by Linfield for the 4th time.

== Group standings ==
Pos	Team	Pld	W	D	L	GF	GA	GR	Pts	Result
1	Linfield (C)	8	6	1	1	17	7	2.429	13	Champions
2	Glenavon	8	4	2	2	14	10	1.400	10	
3	Glentoran	8	4	1	3	14	10	1.400	9	
4	Distillery	8	3	2	3	8	9	0.889	8	
5	Cliftonville	8	0	0	8	3	20	0.150	0	

Source: Irish League Archive
(C) Champions

== Results ==
Home \ Away	CLI	DIS	GLA	GLT	LIN
Cliftonville		0–2	0–2	2–3	0–2
Distillery	1–0		1–1	2–1	1–3
Glenavon	2–0	1–0		3–2	2–3
Glentoran	3–0	2–0	2–2		0–1
Linfield	5–1	1–1	2–1	0–1	

Source: Irish League Archive
Legend: Blue = home team win; Yellow = draw; Red = away team win.
