= 1990–91 Gold Cup =

Tournament details
- Country: Northern Ireland
- Teams: 16

Final positions
- Champions: Glenavon (3rd win)
- Runners-up: Portadown

Tournament statistics
- Matches played: 31
- Goals scored: 81 (2.61 per match)

The 1990–91 Gold Cup was the 72nd edition of the Gold Cup, a cup competition in Northern Irish football.

The tournament was won by Glenavon for the 3rd time, defeating Portadown 2–1 in the final at Windsor Park.

== Group standings ==
=== Section A ===
Pos	Team	Pld	W	D	L	GF	GA	GD	Pts	Result
1	Portadown	3	1	2	0	4	3	+1	5	Advance to quarter-final
2	Distillery	3	1	1	1	4	3	+1	4	Advance to quarter-final
3	Carrick Rangers	3	1	1	1	2	4	−2	4	
4	Newry Town	3	1	0	2	5	5	0	3	

Source: Irish League Archive

=== Section B ===
Pos	Team	Pld	W	D	L	GF	GA	GD	Pts	Result
1	Cliftonville	3	2	1	0	6	2	+4	7	Advance to quarter-final
2	Ballymena United	3	1	1	1	4	4	0	4	Advance to quarter-final
3	Coleraine	3	1	1	1	2	2	0	4	
4	Ards	3	0	1	2	4	8	−4	1	

Source: Irish League Archive

=== Section C ===
Pos	Team	Pld	W	D	L	GF	GA	GD	Pts	Result
1	Bangor	3	2	1	0	6	3	+3	7	Advance to quarter-final
2	Larne	3	1	2	0	5	4	+1	5	Advance to quarter-final
3	Ballyclare Comrades	3	0	2	1	1	2	−1	2	
4	Linfield	3	0	1	2	2	5	−3	1	

Source: Irish League Archive

=== Section D ===
Pos	Team	Pld	W	D	L	GF	GA	GD	Pts	Result
1	Glenavon	3	2	0	1	10	8	+2	6	Advance to quarter-final
2	Omagh Town	3	2	0	1	8	7	+1	6	Advance to quarter-final
3	Crusaders	3	1	0	2	8	9	−1	3	
4	Glentoran	3	1	0	2	3	5	−2	3	

Source: Irish League Archive

== Quarter-finals ==
Team 1	Score	Team 2
Bangor	1–0	Omagh Town
Cliftonville	3–1	Distillery
Glenavon	1–0	Larne
Portadown	3–1	Ballymena United

== Semi-finals ==
Team 1	Score	Team 2
Glenavon	2–1	Cliftonville
Portadown	1–0	Bangor

== Final ==
20 November 1990

Glenavon	2–1	Portadown
McCoy 65'; McBride 70'		Cunningham 32'

Windsor Park, Belfast
Referee: N. Loughins (Belfast)
