= 1989–90 Gold Cup =

Tournament details
- Country: Northern Ireland
- Teams: 14

Final positions
- Champions: Linfield (32nd win)
- Runners-up: Portadown

Tournament statistics
- Matches played: 31
- Goals scored: 80 (2.58 per match)

The 1989–90 Gold Cup was the 71st edition of the Gold Cup, a cup competition in Northern Irish football.

The tournament was won by Linfield for the 32nd time and 3rd consecutive season, defeating Portadown 2–0 in the final replay at The Oval after the original final ended 0-0.

== Group standings ==
=== Section A ===
| Pos | Team | Pld | W | D | L | GF | GA | GD | Pts | Result |
|---|---|---|---|---|---|---|---|---|---|---|
| 1 | Linfield | 3 | 2 | 1 | 0 | 6 | 4 | +2 | 7 | Advance to semi-final |
| 2 | Bangor | 3 | 0 | 3 | 0 | 2 | 2 | 0 | 3 | |
| 3 | Ballymena United | 3 | 0 | 2 | 1 | 2 | 3 | −1 | 2 | |
| 4 | Cliftonville | 3 | 0 | 2 | 1 | 2 | 3 | −1 | 2 | |

Source: Irish League Archive

=== Section B ===
| Pos | Team | Pld | W | D | L | GF | GA | GD | Pts | Result |
|---|---|---|---|---|---|---|---|---|---|---|
| 1 | Glentoran | 3 | 2 | 1 | 0 | 5 | 2 | +3 | 7 | Advance to semi-final |
| 2 | Ards | 3 | 1 | 1 | 1 | 4 | 4 | 0 | 4 | |
| 3 | Newry Town | 3 | 1 | 0 | 2 | 6 | 4 | +2 | 3 | |
| 4 | Carrick Rangers | 3 | 0 | 2 | 1 | 1 | 6 | −5 | 2 | |

Source: Irish League Archive

=== Section C ===
| Pos | Team | Pld | W | D | L | GF | GA | GD | Pts | Result |
|---|---|---|---|---|---|---|---|---|---|---|
| 1 | Glenavon | 5 | 4 | 1 | 0 | 12 | 3 | +9 | 13 | Advance to semi-final |
| 2 | Portadown | 5 | 4 | 1 | 0 | 10 | 2 | +8 | 13 | Advance to semi-final |
| 3 | Larne | 5 | 2 | 1 | 2 | 8 | 10 | −2 | 7 | |
| 4 | Coleraine | 5 | 2 | 0 | 3 | 6 | 7 | −1 | 6 | |
| 5 | Distillery | 5 | 1 | 1 | 3 | 7 | 8 | −1 | 4 | |
| 6 | Crusaders | 5 | 0 | 0 | 5 | 2 | 15 | −13 | 0 | |

Source: Irish League Archive

== Semi-finals ==
| Team 1 | Score | Team 2 |
|---|---|---|
| Linfield | 1–0 | Glenavon |
| Portadown | 2–2 (a.e.t.) (3–0 p) | Glentoran |

== Final ==
7 November 1989

| Linfield | 0–0 | Portadown |

The Oval, Belfast
Referee: Freddie McKnight (Newtownards)

=== Replay ===
22 November 1989

| Linfield | 2–0 | Portadown |
|---|---|---|
| McCallan 23'; Knell 63'; Dornan (red card) 64' |

The Oval, Belfast
Attendance: 4,500
Referee: Freddie McKnight (Newtownards)
