= 1922–23 Gold Cup =

Tournament details
- Country: Northern Ireland
- Teams: 6

Final positions
- Champions: Cliftonville (1st win)
- Runners-up: Glenavon

Tournament statistics
- Matches played: 30
- Goals scored: 73 (2.43 per match)

The 1922–23 Gold Cup was the 11th edition of the Gold Cup, a cup competition in Northern Irish football.

The tournament was won by Cliftonville for the 1st time.

== Group standings ==
| Pos | Team | Pld | W | D | L | GF | GA | GR | Pts | Result |
|---|---|---|---|---|---|---|---|---|---|---|
| 1 | Cliftonville (C) | 10 | 8 | 2 | 0 | 18 | 5 | 3.600 | 18 | Champions |
| 2 | Glenavon | 10 | 6 | 2 | 2 | 15 | 9 | 1.667 | 14 | |
| 3 | Distillery | 10 | 2 | 4 | 4 | 13 | 15 | 0.867 | 8 | |
| 4 | Linfield | 10 | 3 | 2 | 5 | 9 | 11 | 0.818 | 8 | |
| 5 | Queen's Island | 10 | 2 | 3 | 5 | 12 | 19 | 0.632 | 7 | |
| 6 | Glentoran | 10 | 1 | 3 | 6 | 6 | 14 | 0.429 | 5 | |

Source: Irish League Archive
(C) Champions

== Results ==
| Home \ Away | CLI | DIS | GLA | GLT | LIN | QUE |
|---|---|---|---|---|---|---|
| Cliftonville | | 2–1 | 3–0 | 2–0 | 2–0 | 2–2 |
| Distillery | 1–2 | | 0–1 | 0–0 | 1–0 | 2–2 |
| Glenavon | 0–1 | 2–2 | | 1–0 | 3–1 | 4–0 |
| Glentoran | 0–2 | 2–2 | 1–2 | | 0–2 | 3–1 |
| Linfield | 1–1 | 2–1 | 0–1 | 0–0 | | 0–2 |
| Queen's Island | 0–1 | 2–3 | 1–1 | 2–0 | 0–3 | |

Source: Irish League Archive
Legend: Blue = home team win; Yellow = draw; Red = away team win.
