= 1927–28 Gold Cup =

Tournament details
- Country: Northern Ireland
- Teams: 14

Final positions
- Champions: Linfield (8th win)
- Runners-up: Belfast Celtic

Tournament statistics
- Matches played: 17
- Goals scored: 63 (3.71 per match)

The 1927–28 Gold Cup was the 16th edition of the Gold Cup, a cup competition in Northern Irish football.

The tournament was won by Linfield for the 8th time and 2nd consecutive year, defeating Belfast Celtic 3–2 in the final at Grosvenor Park.

== Results ==
=== First round ===
Team 1	Score	Team 2
Bangor	2–2	Ards
Cliftonville	1–2	Glenavon
Coleraine	3–2	Barn
Glentoran	1–3	Belfast Celtic
Larne	1–0	Queen's Island
Linfield	4–1	Portadown
Newry Town	0–1	Distillery

==== Replay ====
Team 1	Score	Team 2
Ards	4–0	Bangor

=== Quarter-finals ===
Team 1	Score	Team 2
Ards	0–0	Larne
Coleraine	2–3	Belfast Celtic
Linfield	7–0	Distillery
Glenavon	bye	

==== Replay ====
Team 1	Score	Team 2
Larne	1–1	Ards

==== Second replay ====
Team 1	Score	Team 2
Ards	4–2	Larne

=== Semi-finals ===
Team 1	Score	Team 2
Belfast Celtic	2–2	Ards
Linfield	3–1	Glenavon

==== Replay ====
Team 1	Score	Team 2
Belfast Celtic	3–0	Ards

=== Final ===
21 March 1928

Linfield	3–2	Belfast Celtic
Bambrick 1', 2', 42'	Report	J. Mahood 8'; Curran 71'

Grosvenor Park, Belfast
Referee: A. E. Fogg (Bolton)
