= 1954–55 Gold Cup =

Tournament details
- Country: Northern Ireland
- Teams: 12

Final positions
- Champions: Glenavon (1st win)
- Runners-up: Linfield

Tournament statistics
- Matches played: 12
- Goals scored: 46 (3.83 per match)

The 1954–55 Gold Cup was the 36th edition of the Gold Cup, a cup competition in Northern Irish football.

The tournament was won by Glenavon for the 1st time, defeating Linfield 3–2 in the final at The Oval.

== Results ==
=== First round ===
Team 1	Score	Team 2
Crusaders	4–3	Ards
Distillery	0–3	Coleraine
Glentoran	2–1	Cliftonville
Linfield	4–1	Bangor
Ballymena United	bye	
Derry City	bye	
Glenavon	bye	
Portadown	bye	

=== Quarter-finals ===
Team 1	Score	Team 2
Ballymena United	0–0	Portadown
Crusaders	1–2	Coleraine
Glenavon	6–2	Glentoran
Linfield	2–1	Derry City

==== Replay ====
Team 1	Score	Team 2
Portadown	0–2	Ballymena United

=== Semi-finals ===
Team 1	Score	Team 2
Glenavon	4–1	Ballymena United
Linfield	3–0	Coleraine

=== Final ===
4 May 1955

Glenavon	3–2	Linfield
Jones 33', 39', 61'	Report	Kennedy 50'; Dickson 53'

The Oval, Belfast
Attendance: 20,000
Referee: A. Holland (Barnsley)
