= 1975–76 Gold Cup =

Tournament details
- Country: Northern Ireland
- Teams: 12

Final positions
- Champions: Coleraine (5th win)
- Runners-up: Ballymena United

Tournament statistics
- Matches played: 11
- Goals scored: 40 (3.64 per match)

The 1975–76 Gold Cup was the 57th edition of the Gold Cup, a cup competition in Northern Irish football.

The tournament was won by Coleraine for the 5th time, defeating Ballymena United 2–1 in the final at the Ballymena Showgrounds.

== Results ==
=== First round ===
Team 1	Score	Team 2
Ards	0–3	Coleraine
Ballymena United	4–2	Portadown
Cliftonville	1–2	Larne
Distillery	3–2	Crusaders
Bangor	bye	
Glenavon	bye	
Glentoran	bye	
Larne	bye	

=== Quarter-finals ===
Team 1	Score	Team 2
Ballymena United	6–0	Distillery
Coleraine	5–1	Larne
Glentoran	0–0 (5–4 p)	Larne
Linfield	0–1	Glenavon

=== Semi-finals ===
Team 1	Score	Team 2
Ballymena United	4–1	Glenavon
Coleraine	2–0	Glentoran

=== Final ===
12 November 1975

Ballymena United	1–2	Coleraine
Brown 36'	Report	Jennings 13'; Smith 32'

The Showgrounds, Ballymena
Attendance: 6,000
Referee: Malcolm Moffatt (Banbridge)
