= 1986–87 Gold Cup =

Tournament details
- Country: Northern Ireland
- Teams: 14

Final positions
- Champions: Glentoran (9th win)
- Runners-up: Linfield

Tournament statistics
- Matches played: 45
- Goals scored: 139 (3.09 per match)

The 1986–87 Gold Cup was the 68th edition of the Gold Cup, a cup competition in Northern Irish football.

The tournament was won by Glentoran for the 9th time, defeating Linfield 3–2 in the final at The Oval.

== Group standings ==
=== Section A ===
Pos	Team	Pld	W	D	L	GF	GA	GD	Pts	Result
1	Linfield	6	4	1	1	14	5	+9	13	Advance to semi-final
2	Larne	6	4	1	1	12	9	+3	13	Advance to semi-final
3	Coleraine	6	3	2	1	9	7	+2	11	
4	Cliftonville	6	3	1	2	10	6	+4	10	
5	Ballymena United	6	1	3	2	7	11	−4	6	
6	Crusaders	6	0	2	4	2	6	−4	2	
7	Carrick Rangers	6	0	2	4	4	14	−10	2	

Source: Irish League Archive

=== Section B ===
Pos	Team	Pld	W	D	L	GF	GA	GD	Pts	Result
1	Glentoran	6	5	1	0	19	2	+17	16	Advance to semi-final
2	Ards	6	4	0	2	12	7	+5	12	Advance to semi-final
3	Newry Town	6	3	0	3	10	11	−1	9	
4	Glenavon	6	2	1	3	9	6	+3	7	
5	Distillery	6	2	1	3	10	15	−5	7	
6	Portadown	6	2	0	4	7	11	−4	6	
7	Bangor	6	1	1	4	4	19	−15	4	

Source: Irish League Archive

== Semi-finals ==
Team 1	Score	Team 2
Glentoran	2–0	Larne
Linfield	2–1	Ards

== Final ==
25 April 1987

Glentoran	3–2	Linfield
Macartney 14'; Mullan 27'; Craig 89'	Report	McGaughey 50', 73'

The Oval, Belfast
Referee: Robert Stewart (Lisburn)
