= 1914–15 Gold Cup =

Tournament details
- Country: Ireland
- Teams: 7

Final positions
- Champions: Shelbourne (1st win)
- Runners-up: Linfield

Tournament statistics
- Matches played: 7
- Goals scored: 23 (3.29 per match)

The 1914–15 Gold Cup was the 3rd edition of the Gold Cup, a cup competition in Irish football.

The tournament was won by Shelbourne for the 1st time, defeating Linfield 1–0 in the final at Solitude.

== Results ==
=== Quarter-finals ===
Team 1	Score	Team 2
Belfast Celtic	1–1	Linfield
Cliftonville	2–4	Shelbourne
Glenavon	bye	
Glentoran	1–2	Distillery

==== Replay ====
Team 1	Score	Team 2
Linfield	6–0	Belfast Celtic

=== Semi-finals ===
Team 1	Score	Team 2
Linfield	2–0	Glenavon
Shelbourne	2–1	Distillery

=== Final ===
5 April 1915

Shelbourne	1–0	Linfield
Corcoran 40'	Report

Solitude, Belfast
Attendance: 18,000
Referee: J. Allderson (Newton-le-Willows)
