= 1916–17 Gold Cup =

Tournament details
- Country: Ireland
- Teams: 6

Final positions
- Champions: Glentoran (1st win)
- Runners-up: Distillery

Tournament statistics
- Matches played: 15
- Goals scored: 36 (2.4 per match)

The 1916–17 Gold Cup was the 5th edition of the Gold Cup, a cup competition in Irish football.

The tournament was won by Glentoran for the 1st time.

== Group standings ==
Pos	Team	Pld	W	D	L	GF	GA	GR	Pts	Result
1	Glentoran (C)	5	4	1	0	8	1	8.000	9	Champions
2	Distillery	5	3	1	1	7	4	1.750	7	
3	Linfield	5	3	0	2	12	2	6.000	6	
4	Cliftonville	5	3	0	2	6	4	1.500	6	
5	Belfast United	5	0	1	4	2	11	0.182	1	
6	Glenavon	5	0	1	4	1	14	0.071	1	

Source: Irish League Archive
(C) Champions

== Results ==
Home \ Away	BEL	CLI	DIS	GLA	GLT	LIN
Belfast United						
Cliftonville	2–0		0–2	3–1		
Distillery	2–1			3–0		0–3
Glenavon	0–0					
Glentoran	4–0	1–0	0–0	3–0		
Linfield	3–1	0–1		5–0	1–0 (Note: The match was abandoned after 63 minutes and a replay was ordered. Linfield refused to play and the points were awarded to Glentoran)	

Source: Irish League Archive
Legend: Blue = home team win; Yellow = draw; Red = away team win.
