= 1992–93 Gold Cup =

Tournament details
- Country: Northern Ireland
- Teams: 16

Final positions
- Champions: Portadown (6th win)
- Runners-up: Cliftonville

Tournament statistics
- Matches played: 31
- Goals scored: 84 (2.71 per match)

The 1992–93 Gold Cup was the 74th edition of the Gold Cup, a cup competition in Northern Irish football.

The tournament was won by Portadown for the 6th time, defeating Cliftonville 1–0 in the final at Windsor Park.

== Group standings ==
=== Section A ===
Pos	Team	Pld	W	D	L	GF	GA	GD	Pts	Result
1	Glenavon	3	2	1	0	7	3	+4	7	Advance to quarter-final
2	Glentoran	3	2	0	1	7	3	+4	6	Advance to quarter-final
3	Ards	3	1	1	1	4	4	0	4	
4	Ballyclare Comrades	3	0	0	3	0	8	−8	0	

Source: Irish League Archive

=== Section B ===
Pos	Team	Pld	W	D	L	GF	GA	GD	Pts	Result
1	Portadown	3	2	1	0	6	2	+4	7	Advance to quarter-final
2	Cliftonville	3	1	2	0	5	2	+3	5	Advance to quarter-final
3	Newry Town	3	0	2	1	2	4	−2	2	
4	Omagh Town	3	0	1	2	2	7	−5	1	

Source: Irish League Archive

=== Section C ===
Pos	Team	Pld	W	D	L	GF	GA	GD	Pts	Result
1	Distillery	3	2	0	1	6	7	−1	6	Advance to quarter-final
2	Bangor	3	1	1	1	7	4	+3	4	Advance to quarter-final
3	Coleraine	3	1	1	1	1	2	−1	4	
4	Linfield	3	0	2	1	2	3	−1	2	

Source: Irish League Archive

=== Section D ===
Pos	Team	Pld	W	D	L	GF	GA	GD	Pts	Result
1	Crusaders	3	2	1	0	3	1	+2	7	Advance to quarter-final
2	Ballymena United	3	2	0	1	7	2	+5	6	Advance to quarter-final
3	Larne	3	1	1	1	3	4	−1	4	
4	Carrick Rangers	3	0	0	3	2	8	−6	0	

Source: Irish League Archive

== Quarter-finals ==
Team 1	Score	Team 2
Crusaders	1–5	Bangor
Distillery	0–2	Ballymena United
Glenavon	1–2	Cliftonville
Portadown	1–0	Glentoran

== Semi-finals ==
Team 1	Score	Team 2
Cliftonville	2–1	Ballymena United
Portadown	4–0	Bangor

== Final ==
11 November 1992

Portadown	1–0	Cliftonville
Nutt 3' (o.g.)

Windsor Park, Belfast
Attendance: 7,000
Referee: Frank McDonald (Newry)
