= 1924–25 Gold Cup =

Tournament details
- Country: Northern Ireland
- Teams: 12

Final positions
- Champions: Distillery (3rd win)
- Runners-up: Queen's Island

Tournament statistics
- Matches played: 19
- Goals scored: 52 (2.74 per match)

The 1924–25 Gold Cup was the 13th edition of the Gold Cup, a cup competition in Northern Irish football.

The tournament was won by Distillery for the 3rd time, defeating Queen's Island 2–0 in the final replay at Celtic Park, after the previous final match had ended in a 1–1 draw.

== Results ==
=== First round ===
Team 1	Score	Team 2
Ards	0–0	Linfield
Barn	3–0	Newry Town
Cliftonville	0–1	Glentoran
Larne	1–1	Belfast Celtic
Distillery	6–2	Glenavon
Portadown	2–2	Queen's Island

==== Replays ====
Team 1	Score	Team 2
Belfast Celtic	1–0	Larne
Linfield	2–1	Ards
Queen's Island	5–0	Portadown

=== Quarter-finals ===
Team 1	Score	Team 2
Barn	w/o	
Distillery	w/o	
Linfield	1–1	Belfast Celtic
Queen's Island	1–0	Glentoran

==== Replay ====
Team 1	Score	Team 2
Belfast Celtic	1–1	Linfield

==== Second replay ====
Team 1	Score	Team 2
Linfield	2–1	Belfast Celtic

=== Semi-finals ===
Team 1	Score	Team 2
Distillery	3–2	Barn
Queen's Island	2–2	Linfield

==== Replay ====
Team 1	Score	Team 2
Queen's Island	0–0	Linfield

==== Second replay ====
Team 1	Score	Team 2
Queen's Island	3–1	Linfield

=== Final ===
17 March 1925

Distillery	1–1	Queen's Island
Thompson	Report	Scott

Celtic Park, Belfast
Referee: J.B. Stark

==== Replay ====
8 April 1925

Distillery	2–0	Queen's Island
Dalrymple; Rush	Report

Celtic Park, Belfast
Referee: J.B. Stark
