= 1936–37 Gold Cup =

Tournament details
- Country: Northern Ireland
- Teams: 14

Final positions
- Champions: Linfield (12th win)
- Runners-up: Derry City

Tournament statistics
- Matches played: 14
- Goals scored: 64 (4.57 per match)

The 1936–37 Gold Cup was the 25th edition of the Gold Cup, a cup competition in Northern Irish football.

The tournament was won by Linfield for the 12th time and 2nd consecutive year, defeating Derry City 7–2 in the final at The Oval.

== Results ==
=== First round ===
Team 1	Score	Team 2
Bangor	0–2	Newry Town
Belfast Celtic	2–1	Glentoran
Cliftonville	0–1	Coleraine
Distillery	4–3	Ballymena United
Larne	2–2	Coleraine
Linfield	5–0	Ards
Portadown	1–3	Derry City

==== Replay ====
Team 1	Score	Team 2
Coleraine	1–3	Larne

=== Quarter-finals ===
Team 1	Score	Team 2
Belfast Celtic	5–0	Larne
Derry City	2–1	Distillery
Linfield	5–2	Glenavon
Newry Town	bye	

=== Semi-finals ===
Team 1	Score	Team 2
Derry City	3–1	Newry Town
Linfield	5–1	Belfast Celtic

=== Final ===
2 December 1936

Linfield	7–2	Derry City
Hume 40', 70', 89'; McMurray 53'; Baird 63', 71', 74'	Report	Carlyle 14' (pen.), 75' (pen.)

The Oval, Belfast
Referee: H. E. Hull (Stockport)
