= 1931–32 Gold Cup =

Tournament details
- Country: Northern Ireland
- Teams: 14

Final positions
- Champions: Coleraine (1st win)
- Runners-up: Ballymena

Tournament statistics
- Matches played: 17
- Goals scored: 52 (3.06 per match)

The 1931–32 Gold Cup was the 20th edition of the Gold Cup, a cup competition in Northern Irish football.

The tournament was won by Coleraine for the 1st time, defeating Ballymena 3–0 in the final at Solitude.

== Results ==
=== First round ===
Team 1	Score	Team 2
Ballymena	1–0	Distillery
Belfast Celtic	4–2	Glenavon
Cliftonville	2–2	Ards
Coleraine	3–0	Glentoran
Derry City	1–0	Larne
Linfield	2–0	Bangor
Newry Town	0–0	Portadown

==== Replay ====
Team 1	Score	Team 2
Ards	6–0	Cliftonville
Portadown	2–2	Newry Town

==== Second replay ====
Team 1	Score	Team 2
Newry Town	1–0	Portadown

=== Quarter-finals ===
Team 1	Score	Team 2
Ballymena	3–1	Ards
Coleraine	1–1	Newry Town
Linfield	3–0	Belfast Celtic
Derry City	bye	

==== Replay ====
Team 1	Score	Team 2
Newry Town	1–5	Coleraine

=== Semi-finals ===
Team 1	Score	Team 2
Ballymena	3–0	Linfield
Coleraine	3–0	Derry City

=== Final ===
9 December 1931

Coleraine	3–0	Ballymena
Williamson 22' (pen.); Devan 52'; Nesbitt 70'	Report

Solitude, Belfast
Referee: W. McLean
