= 1967–68 Gold Cup =

Tournament details
- Country: Northern Ireland
- Teams: 12

Final positions
- Champions: Linfield (22nd win)
- Runners-up: Ards

Tournament statistics
- Matches played: 14
- Goals scored: 59 (4.21 per match)

The 1967–68 Gold Cup was the 49th edition of the Gold Cup, a cup competition in Northern Irish football.

The tournament was won by Linfield for the 22nd time, defeating Ards 3–2 in the final at The Oval.

== Results ==
=== First round ===
Team 1	Score	Team 2
Glenavon	8–1	Ballymena United
Glentoran	0–1	Ards
Linfield	5–1	Cliftonville
Portadown	3–1	Bangor
Coleraine	bye	
Crusaders	bye	
Derry City	bye	
Distillery	bye	

=== Quarter-finals ===
Team 1	Score	Team 2
Coleraine	6–1	Portadown
Crusaders	4–5	Derry City
Distillery	1–1	Linfield
Glenavon	0–0	Ards

==== Replays ====
Team 1	Score	Team 2
Ards	2–0	Glenavon
Linfield	5–1	Distillery

=== Semi-finals ===
Team 1	Score	Team 2
Ards	2–2	Derry City
Linfield	2–1	Coleraine

==== Replay ====
Team 1	Score	Team 2
Ards	1–0	Derry City

=== Final ===
29 November 1967

Linfield	3–2	Ards
Wood 12' (pen.); Shields 28', 55'	Report	McAvoy 14'; Mowat 75'

The Oval, Belfast
Attendance: 11,500
Referee: J. H. Yates (Worcester)
