= 1956–57 Gold Cup =

Tournament details
- Country: Northern Ireland
- Teams: 12

Final positions
- Champions: Glenavon (2nd win)
- Runners-up: Derry City

Tournament statistics
- Matches played: 14
- Goals scored: 38 (2.71 per match)

The 1956–57 Gold Cup was the 38th edition of the Gold Cup, a cup competition in Northern Irish football.

The tournament was won by Glenavon for the 2nd time, defeating Derry City 3–1 in the final at The Oval.

== Results ==
=== First round ===
Team 1	Score	Team 2
Ballymena United	0–2	Bangor
Coleraine	3–0	Ards
Crusaders	2–1	Glentoran
Linfield	1–3	Glenavon
Cliftonville	bye	
Derry City	bye	
Distillery	bye	
Portadown	bye	

=== Quarter-finals ===
Team 1	Score	Team 2
Bangor	0–0	Coleraine
Derry City	1–0	Portadown
Distillery	2–2	Cliftonville
Glenavon	2–0	Crusaders

==== Replays ====
Team 1	Score	Team 2
Cliftonville	0–1	Distillery
Coleraine	1–1	Bangor

==== Second replay ====
Team 1	Score	Team 2
Bangor	1–3	Coleraine

=== Semi-finals ===
Team 1	Score	Team 2
Coleraine	3–1	Derry City
Glenavon	3–1	Cliftonville

=== Final ===
17 May 1957

Glenavon	3–1	Derry City
Elwood 27'; Jones 43', 90'	Report	Nash 62'

The Oval, Belfast
