= 1933–34 Gold Cup =

Tournament details
- Country: Northern Ireland
- Teams: 14

Final positions
- Champions: Portadown (1st win)
- Runners-up: Glentoran

Tournament statistics
- Matches played: 15
- Goals scored: 42 (2.8 per match)

The 1933–34 Gold Cup was the 22nd edition of the Gold Cup, a cup competition in Northern Irish football.

The tournament was won by Portadown for the 1st time, defeating Glentoran 1–0 in the final at Solitude.

== Results ==
=== First round ===
Team 1	Score	Team 2
Ards	0–2	Cliftonville
Bangor	0–3	Belfast Celtic
Coleraine	3–1	Linfield
Distillery	1–0	Derry City
Larne	1–1	Ballymena
Newry Town	0–2	Glentoran
Portadown	2–1	Glenavon

==== Replay ====
Team 1	Score	Team 2
Ballymena	3–0	Larne

=== Quarter-finals ===
Team 1	Score	Team 2
Cliftonville	1–4	Portadown
Coleraine	0–0	Distillery
Glentoran	2–1	Ballymena
Belfast Celtic	bye	

=== Semi-finals ===
Team 1	Score	Team 2
Glentoran	3–1	Belfast Celtic
Portadown	2–1	Distillery

=== Final ===
6 December 1933

Portadown	1–0	Glentoran
Johnstone 85'	Report

Solitude, Belfast
Referee: W. McLean
