= 1993–94 Gold Cup =

Tournament details
- Country: Northern Ireland
- Teams: 16

Final positions
- Champions: Distillery (5th win)
- Runners-up: Bangor

Tournament statistics
- Matches played: 31
- Goals scored: 119 (3.84 per match)

The 1993–94 Gold Cup was the 75th edition of the Gold Cup, a cup competition in Northern Irish football.

The tournament was won by Distillery for the 5th time, defeating Bangor 3–2 in the final at Windsor Park.

== Group standings ==
=== Section A ===
Pos	Team	Pld	W	D	L	GF	GA	GD	Pts	Result
1	Cliftonville	3	3	0	0	10	1	+9	9	Advance to quarter-final
2	Linfield	3	2	0	1	5	2	+3	6	Advance to quarter-final
3	Ards	3	0	1	2	1	7	−6	1	
4	Newry Town	3	0	1	2	1	7	−6	1	

Source: Irish League Archive

=== Section B ===
Pos	Team	Pld	W	D	L	GF	GA	GD	Pts	Result
1	Crusaders	3	2	1	0	7	1	+6	7	Advance to quarter-final
2	Distillery	3	2	1	0	6	0	+6	7	Advance to quarter-final
3	Omagh Town	3	1	0	2	3	6	−3	3	
4	Coleraine	3	0	0	3	1	10	−9	0	

Source: Irish League Archive

=== Section C ===
Pos	Team	Pld	W	D	L	GF	GA	GD	Pts	Result
1	Glenavon	3	3	0	0	15	3	+12	9	Advance to quarter-final
2	Bangor	3	2	0	1	12	8	+4	6	Advance to quarter-final
3	Carrick Rangers	3	1	0	2	5	11	−6	3	
4	Ballyclare Comrades	3	0	0	3	3	13	−10	0	

Source: Irish League Archive

=== Section D ===
Pos	Team	Pld	W	D	L	GF	GA	GD	Pts	Result
1	Portadown	3	3	0	0	10	3	+7	9	Advance to quarter-final
2	Glentoran	3	2	0	1	6	2	+4	6	Advance to quarter-final
3	Ballymena United	3	1	0	2	3	6	−3	3	
4	Larne	3	0	0	3	1	9	−8	0	

Source: Irish League Archive

== Quarter-finals ==
Team 1	Score	Team 2
Cliftonville	1–1 (a.e.t.) (1–3 p)	Distillery
Crusaders	2–5	Linfield
Glenavon	3–3 (a.e.t.) (7–8 p)	Glentoran
Portadown	0–4	Bangor

== Semi-finals ==
Team 1	Score	Team 2
Bangor	2–0	Linfield
Distillery	2–1	Glentoran

== Final ==
2 November 1993

Distillery	3–2 (a.e.t.)	Bangor
Calvin 31'; Cleland 78'; Armstrong 115'		Glendinning 45'; Spiers 52'

Windsor Park, Belfast
Referee: Alan Snoddy (Carryduff)
