= 1961–62 Gold Cup =

Tournament details
- Country: Northern Ireland
- Teams: 12

Final positions
- Champions: Linfield (19th win)
- Runners-up: Glentoran

Tournament statistics
- Matches played: 15
- Goals scored: 63 (4.2 per match)

The 1961–62 Gold Cup was the 43rd edition of the Gold Cup, a cup competition in Northern Irish football.

The tournament was won by Linfield for the 19th time, defeating Glentoran 4–0 in the final at Grosvenor Park.

== Results ==
=== First round ===
Team 1	Score	Team 2
Cliftonville	3–3	Ards
Coleraine	2–0	Distillery
Derry City	1–1	Linfield
Glentoran	4–1	Ballymena United
Bangor	bye	
Crusaders	bye	
Glenavon	bye	
Portadown	bye	

==== Replays ====
Team 1	Score	Team 2
Ards	5–1	Cliftonville
Linfield	2–0	Derry City

=== Quarter-finals ===
Team 1	Score	Team 2
Coleraine	2–0	Portadown
Glenavon	5–1	Crusaders
Glentoran	6–1	Ards
Linfield	2–2	Bangor

==== Replay ====
Team 1	Score	Team 2
Linfield	1–1	Bangor

==== Second replay ====
Team 1	Score	Team 2
Linfield	3–1	Bangor

=== Semi-finals ===
Team 1	Score	Team 2
Glentoran	4–3	Coleraine
Linfield	4–0	Glenavon

=== Final ===
5 December 1961

Linfield	4–0	Glentoran
Dickson 55', 59'; Stewart 57'; Gough 87' (pen.)	Report

Grosvenor Park, Belfast
Referee: A. Ellis (Halifax)
