= 1984–85 Gold Cup =

Tournament details
- Country: Northern Ireland
- Teams: 14

Final positions
- Champions: Linfield (29th win)
- Runners-up: Glentoran

Tournament statistics
- Matches played: 52
- Goals scored: 166 (3.19 per match)

The 1984–85 Gold Cup was the 66th edition of the Gold Cup, a cup competition in Northern Irish football.

The tournament was won by Linfield for the 29th time and the 2nd consecutive season, defeating Glentoran 1–0 in the final at Windsor Park.

For this edition, the format followed the same setup as the previous season; Section A clubs played each other twice and played three matches with Section B clubs (and vice versa for Section B clubs). Section C clubs played each other once and played four matches with Section D clubs (and vice versa for Section D clubs). The clubs that topped each section progressed to the semi-finals.

== Group standings ==
=== Section A ===
| Pos | Team | Pld | W | D | L | GF | GA | GD | Pts | Result |
|---|---|---|---|---|---|---|---|---|---|---|
| 1 | Glentoran | 7 | 4 | 3 | 0 | 17 | 2 | +15 | 11 | Advance to final |
| 2 | Ards | 7 | 2 | 3 | 2 | 9 | 7 | +2 | 7 | |
| 3 | Bangor | 7 | 1 | 0 | 6 | 4 | 21 | −17 | 2 | |

Source: Irish League Archive

=== Section B ===
| Pos | Team | Pld | W | D | L | GF | GA | GD | Pts | Result |
|---|---|---|---|---|---|---|---|---|---|---|
| 1 | Glenavon | 7 | 3 | 3 | 1 | 11 | 6 | +5 | 9 | Advance to final |
| 2 | Portadown | 7 | 4 | 0 | 3 | 12 | 15 | −3 | 8 | |
| 3 | Newry Town | 7 | 2 | 1 | 4 | 12 | 10 | +2 | 5 | |

Source: Irish League Archive

=== Section C ===
| Pos | Team | Pld | W | D | L | GF | GA | GD | Pts | Result |
|---|---|---|---|---|---|---|---|---|---|---|
| 1 | Coleraine | 7 | 4 | 3 | 0 | 15 | 8 | +7 | 11 | Advance to final |
| 2 | Carrick Rangers | 7 | 2 | 3 | 2 | 9 | 16 | −7 | 7 | |
| 3 | Ballymena United | 7 | 2 | 2 | 3 | 9 | 11 | −2 | 6 | |
| 4 | Larne | 7 | 3 | 0 | 4 | 8 | 9 | −1 | 6 | |

Source: Irish League Archive

=== Section D ===
| Pos | Team | Pld | W | D | L | GF | GA | GD | Pts | Result |
|---|---|---|---|---|---|---|---|---|---|---|
| 1 | Linfield | 7 | 4 | 2 | 1 | 16 | 7 | +9 | 10 | Advance to final |
| 2 | Crusaders | 7 | 3 | 1 | 3 | 13 | 8 | +5 | 7 | |
| 3 | Distillery | 7 | 2 | 2 | 3 | 10 | 16 | −6 | 6 | |
| 4 | Cliftonville | 7 | 1 | 1 | 5 | 8 | 13 | −5 | 3 | |

Source: Irish League Archive

== Semi-finals ==
| Team 1 | Score | Team 2 |
|---|---|---|
| Glentoran | 5–3 | Glenavon |
| Linfield | 2–1 | Coleraine |

== Final ==
9 October 1984

| Linfield | 1–0 | Glentoran |
|---|---|---|
| McGaughey 23' |

Windsor Park, Belfast
Referee: Alan Snoddy (Carryduff)
