= 1926–27 Gold Cup =

Tournament details
- Country: Northern Ireland
- Teams: 12

Final positions
- Champions: Linfield (7th win)
- Runners-up: Glenavon

Tournament statistics
- Matches played: 11
- Goals scored: 34 (3.09 per match)

The 1926–27 Gold Cup was the 15th edition of the Gold Cup, a cup competition in Northern Irish football.

The tournament was won by Linfield for the 7th time, defeating Glenavon 1–0 in the final at Celtic Park.

== Results ==
=== First round ===
| Team 1 | Score | Team 2 |
|---|---|---|
| Ards | 1–2 | Belfast Celtic |
| Barn | 3–1 | Portadown |
| Cliftonville | 1–0 | Distillery |
| Glenavon | 4–1 | Newry Town |
| Larne | 1–2 | Linfield |
| Queen's Island | 6–1 | Glentoran |

=== Quarter-finals ===
| Team 1 | Score | Team 2 |
|---|---|---|
| Barn | w/o | |
| Belfast Celtic | 3–0 | Queen's Island |
| Glenavon | w/o | |
| Linfield | 2–0 | Cliftonville |

=== Semi-finals ===
| Team 1 | Score | Team 2 |
|---|---|---|
| Barn | 1–3 | Glenavon |
| Linfield | 2–0 | Belfast Celtic |

=== Final ===
17 March 1927

| Linfield | 1–0 | Glenavon |
|---|---|---|
| McCracken 70' | Report |

Celtic Park, Belfast
Attendance: 15,000
Referee: W. McClean
