= 1928–29 Gold Cup =

Tournament details
- Country: Northern Ireland
- Teams: 14

Final positions
- Champions: Linfield (9th win)
- Runners-up: Ards

Tournament statistics
- Matches played: 13
- Goals scored: 50 (3.85 per match)

The 1928–29 Gold Cup was the 17th edition of the Gold Cup, a cup competition in Northern Irish football.

The tournament was won by Linfield for the 9th time and 3rd consecutive year, defeating Ards 3–1 in the final at The Oval.

== Results ==
=== First round ===
Team 1	Score	Team 2
Ards	2–0	Ballymena
Belfast Celtic	0–1	Newry Town
Coleraine	2–1	Larne
Distillery	1–5	Linfield
Glenavon	4–1	Portadown
Glentoran	6–2	Cliftonville
Queen's Island	2–3	Bangor

=== Quarter-finals ===
Team 1	Score	Team 2
Ards	2–0	Newry Town
Glentoran	3–1	Bangor
Linfield	3–0	Coleraine
Glenavon	bye	

=== Semi-finals ===
Team 1	Score	Team 2
Ards	2–1	Glentoran
Linfield	3–1	Glenavon

=== Final ===
18 March 1929

Linfield	3–1	Ards
Houston; Moorhead (pen.); Somerset	Report	Barrett

The Oval, Belfast
Referee: W. McLean
