= 1941–42 Substitute Gold Cup =

Tournament details
- Country: Northern Ireland
- Teams: 6

Final positions
- Champions: Glentoran (1st win)
- Runners-up: Distillery

Tournament statistics
- Matches played: 30
- Goals scored: 138 (4.6 per match)

The 1941–42 Substitute Gold Cup was the second edition of the Substitute Gold Cup, a cup competition in Northern Irish football. It replaced the Gold Cup, which was suspended due to World War II.

The tournament was won by Glentoran for the 1st time.

== Group standings ==
Pos	Team	Pld	W	D	L	GF	GA	GR	Pts	Result
1	Glentoran (C)	10	8	1	1	35	21	1.667	17	Champions
2	Distillery	10	6	2	2	27	16	1.688	14	
3	Linfield	10	4	3	3	27	23	1.174	11	
4	Belfast Celtic	10	4	2	4	24	15	1.600	10	
5	Derry City	10	2	3	5	16	26	0.615	7	
6	Cliftonville	10	0	1	9	9	37	0.243	1	

Source: Irish League Archive
(C) Champions
