= 1951–52 Gold Cup =

Tournament details
- Country: Northern Ireland
- Teams: 12

Final positions
- Champions: Glentoran (2nd win)
- Runners-up: Glenavon

Tournament statistics
- Matches played: 15
- Goals scored: 59 (3.93 per match)

The 1951–52 Gold Cup was the 33rd edition of the Gold Cup, a cup competition in Northern Irish football.

The tournament was won by Glentoran for the 2nd time, defeating Glenavon 2–1 in the final at Windsor Park.

== Results ==
=== First round ===
Team 1	Score	Team 2
Ballymena United	3–4	Ards
Crusaders	1–2	Glenavon
Glentoran	5–0	Distillery
Linfield	2–0	Derry City
Bangor	bye	
Cliftonville	bye	
Coleraine	bye	
Portadown	bye	

=== Quarter-finals ===
Team 1	Score	Team 2
Ards	1–1	Linfield
Glenavon	4–1	Coleraine
Glentoran	1–1	Bangor
Portadown	4–2	Cliftonville

==== Replays ====
Team 1	Score	Team 2
Bangor	0–2	Glentoran
Linfield	6–2	Ards

=== Semi-finals ===
Team 1	Score	Team 2
Glenavon	2–2	Linfield
Glentoran	2–0	Portadown

==== Replay ====
Team 1	Score	Team 2
Glenavon	2–2	Linfield

==== Second replay ====
Team 1	Score	Team 2
Glenavon	3–1	Linfield

=== Final ===
9 January 1952

Glentoran	2–1	Glenavon
McFarlane 45'; Ewing 50'	Report	Walker 38'

Windsor Park, Belfast
Attendance: 15,000
Referee: P. Thurman (Preston)
