= 1929–30 Gold Cup =

Tournament details
- Country: Northern Ireland
- Teams: 14

Final positions
- Champions: Distillery (4th win)
- Runners-up: Bangor

Tournament statistics
- Matches played: 14
- Goals scored: 62 (4.43 per match)

The 1929–30 Gold Cup was the 18th edition of the Gold Cup, a cup competition in Northern Irish football.

The tournament was won by Distillery for the 4th time, defeating Bangor 3–0 in the final at Windsor Park.

== Results ==
=== First round ===
Team 1	Score	Team 2
Ards	0–3	Glentoran
Ballymena	0–3	Belfast Celtic
Bangor	4–2	Newry Town
Derry City	3–1	Linfield
Distillery	3–2	Coleraine
Glenavon	3–2	Portadown
Larne	6–2	Cliftonville

=== Quarter-finals ===
Team 1	Score	Team 2
Bangor	5–1	Larne
Belfast Celtic	1–3	Glenavon
Derry City	0–1	Glentoran
Distillery	bye	

=== Semi-finals ===
Team 1	Score	Team 2
Bangor	2–1	Glenavon
Distillery	1–1	Glentoran

==== Replay ====
Team 1	Score	Team 2
Distillery	6–3	Glentoran

=== Final ===
17 March 1930

Distillery	3–0	Bangor
Harrison; McAdam; Wallace	Report

Windsor Park, Belfast
Referee: W. McLean
