= 1938–39 Gold Cup =

Tournament details
- Country: Northern Ireland
- Teams: 14

Final positions
- Champions: Belfast Celtic (4th win)
- Runners-up: Glenavon

Tournament statistics
- Matches played: 13
- Goals scored: 57 (4.38 per match)

The 1938–39 Gold Cup was the 27th edition of the Gold Cup, a cup competition in Northern Irish football.

The tournament was won by Belfast Celtic for the 4th time, defeating Glenavon 2–1 in the final at The Oval.

== Results ==
=== First round ===
Team 1	Score	Team 2
Ballymena United	5–3	Ards
Belfast Celtic	3–0	Bangor
Coleraine	1–4	Portadown
Derry City	4–1	Cliftonville
Distillery	0–1	Linfield
Glenavon	2–0	Newry Town
Glentoran	1–0	Larne

=== Quarter-finals ===
Team 1	Score	Team 2
Belfast Celtic	9–3	Ballymena United
Glenavon	2–1	Glentoran
Portadown	3–1	Linfield
Derry City	bye	

=== Semi-finals ===
Team 1	Score	Team 2
Belfast Celtic	3–1	Portadown
Glenavon	5–1	Derry City

=== Final ===
7 December 1938

Belfast Celtic	2–1	Glenavon
McAlinden 20'; Bruce 79'	Report	Halliday 38'

The Oval, Belfast
Attendance: 12,000
Referee: T. Bentley (Manchester)

Jellie
Lavery
(Ireland) Bertie Fulton
McWilliams
Leathem
J. Walker
(Ireland) Norman Kernaghan
(Ireland) Jimmy McAlinden
O'Connor
Bruce
McIlroy

Morrison
Clayton
Weir
Brand
(Ireland) Jack Jones
Magill
Holbeach
O. Burns
Robinson
Reid
Jimmy Halliday
