= 1966–67 Gold Cup =

Tournament details
- Country: Northern Ireland
- Teams: 12

Final positions
- Champions: Glentoran (5th win)
- Runners-up: Crusaders

Tournament statistics
- Matches played: 14
- Goals scored: 65 (4.64 per match)

The 1966–67 Gold Cup was the 48th edition of the Gold Cup, a cup competition in Northern Irish football.

The tournament was won by Glentoran for the 5th time, defeating Crusaders 5–2 in the final at Windsor Park.

== Results ==
=== First round ===
Team 1	Score	Team 2
Coleraine	3–1	Cliftonville
Derry City	1–2	Linfield
Glentoran	3–2	Distillery
Portadown	1–1	Bangor
Ards	bye	
Ballymena United	bye	
Crusaders	bye	
Glenavon	bye	

==== Replay ====
Team 1	Score	Team 2
Bangor	2–3	Portadown

=== Quarter-finals ===
Team 1	Score	Team 2
Ards	3–1	Portadown
Glenavon	1–4	Crusaders
Glentoran	7–3	Ballymena United
Linfield	1–3	Coleraine

=== Semi-finals ===
Team 1	Score	Team 2
Crusaders	1–1	Ards
Glentoran	4–0	Coleraine

==== Replay ====
Team 1	Score	Team 2
Crusaders	2–2	Ards

==== Second replay ====
Team 1	Score	Team 2
Crusaders	4–2	Ards

=== Final ===
18 January 1967

Glentoran	5–2	Crusaders
Thompson 8', 40'; Bruce 23'; Colrain 64'; Stewart 83' (pen.)	Report	Meldrum 31' (pen.); Law 34'

Windsor Park, Belfast
Attendance: 10,000
Referee: Jack Adair (Belfast)
