= 1979–80 Gold Cup =

Tournament details
- Country: Northern Ireland
- Teams: 12

Final positions
- Champions: Linfield (26th win)
- Runners-up: Ballymena United

Tournament statistics
- Matches played: 31
- Goals scored: 114 (3.68 per match)

The 1979–80 Gold Cup was the 61st edition of the Gold Cup, a cup competition in Northern Irish football.

The tournament was won by Linfield, who defeated Ballymena United 2–1 in the final at Windsor Park to secure their 26th win.

== Group standings ==
=== Section A ===
Pos	Team	Pld	W	D	L	GF	GA	GR	Pts	Result
1	Linfield	5	3	1	1	18	9	2.000	7	Advance to final
2	Portadown	5	2	2	1	14	10	1.400	6	
3	Glenavon	5	2	2	1	8	10	0.800	6	
4	Bangor	5	2	1	2	12	11	1.091	5	
5	Ards	5	1	2	2	10	16	0.625	4	
6	Distillery	5	0	2	3	6	12	0.500	2	

Source: Irish League Archive

=== Section B ===
Pos	Team	Pld	W	D	L	GF	GA	GR	Pts	Result
1	Ballymena United	5	5	0	0	16	3	5.333	10	Advance to final
2	Glentoran	5	2	1	2	7	7	1.000	5	
3	Cliftonville	5	2	1	2	7	9	0.778	5	
4	Coleraine	5	2	0	3	7	8	0.875	4	
5	Crusaders	5	2	0	3	5	8	0.625	4	
6	Larne	5	1	0	4	1	8	0.125	2	

Source: Irish League Archive

== Final ==
27 November 1979

Linfield	2–1	Ballymena United
McCurdy 11'; Feeney 62'	Report	Malone 38'

Windsor Park, Belfast
Attendance: 8,000
Referee: Robert Stewart (Finaghy)
