= 1991–92 Gold Cup =

Tournament details
- Country: Northern Ireland
- Teams: 16

Final positions
- Champions: Glentoran (10th win)
- Runners-up: Cliftonville

Tournament statistics
- Matches played: 31
- Goals scored: 110 (3.55 per match)

The 1991–92 Gold Cup was the 73rd edition of the Gold Cup, a cup competition in Northern Irish football.

The tournament was won by Glentoran for the 10th time, defeating Cliftonville 1–0 in the final at Windsor Park.

== Group standings ==
=== Section A ===
Pos	Team	Pld	W	D	L	GF	GA	GD	Pts	Result
1	Portadown	3	2	0	1	7	4	+3	6	Advance to quarter-final
2	Distillery	3	2	0	1	6	4	+2	6	Advance to quarter-final
3	Carrick Rangers	3	1	1	1	5	6	−1	4	
4	Newry Town	3	0	1	2	3	7	−4	1	

Source: Irish League Archive

=== Section B ===
Pos	Team	Pld	W	D	L	GF	GA	GD	Pts	Result
1	Ballymena United	3	3	0	0	7	0	+7	9	Advance to quarter-final
2	Cliftonville	3	1	1	1	3	2	+1	4	Advance to quarter-final
3	Ards	3	1	0	2	5	6	−1	3	
4	Coleraine	3	0	1	2	3	10	−7	1	

Source: Irish League Archive

=== Section C ===
Pos	Team	Pld	W	D	L	GF	GA	GD	Pts	Result
1	Linfield	3	2	0	1	8	5	+3	6	Advance to quarter-final
2	Bangor	3	2	0	1	7	5	+2	6	Advance to quarter-final
3	Larne	3	2	0	1	5	6	−1	6	
4	Ballyclare Comrades	3	0	0	3	2	6	−4	0	

Source: Irish League Archive

=== Section D ===
Pos	Team	Pld	W	D	L	GF	GA	GD	Pts	Result
1	Glentoran	3	2	1	0	11	6	+5	7	Advance to quarter-final
2	Glenavon	3	2	0	1	9	6	+3	6	Advance to quarter-final
3	Crusaders	3	1	1	1	4	5	−1	4	
4	Omagh Town	3	0	0	3	5	12	−7	0	

Source: Irish League Archive

== Quarter-finals ==
Team 1	Score	Team 2
Ballymena United	5–0	Distillery
Glentoran	4–1	Bangor
Linfield	0–0 (a.e.t.) (1–4 p)	Glenavon
Portadown	0–1	Cliftonville

== Semi-finals ==
Team 1	Score	Team 2
Cliftonville	3–2	Glenavon
Glentoran	2–1 (a.e.t.)	Ballymena United

== Final ==
12 November 1991

Glentoran	1–0	Cliftonville
Bowers 90'

Windsor Park, Belfast
Referee: Freddie McKnight (Newtownards)
