= 1988–89 Gold Cup =

Tournament details
- Country: Northern Ireland
- Teams: 14

Final positions
- Champions: Linfield (31st win)
- Runners-up: Portadown

Tournament statistics
- Matches played: 52
- Goals scored: 150 (2.88 per match)

The 1988–89 Gold Cup was the 70th edition of the Gold Cup, a cup competition in Northern Irish football.

The tournament was won by Linfield for the 31st time and 2nd consecutive season, defeating Portadown 1–0 in the final at The Oval.

The format was the same as the previous season, with each team playing the other teams in their section once plus one match against a team from the other section. The top two from each section progressed to the semi-finals.

== Group standings ==
=== Section A ===
Pos	Team	Pld	W	D	L	GF	GA	GD	Pts	Result
1	Linfield	7	7	0	0	16	5	+11	21	Advance to semi-final
2	Portadown	7	3	3	1	10	9	+1	12	Advance to semi-final
3	Coleraine	7	3	1	3	12	10	+2	10	
4	Ballymena United	7	2	2	3	9	8	+1	8	
5	Crusaders	7	2	1	4	5	8	−3	7	
6	Larne	7	1	2	4	6	10	−4	5	
7	Carrick Rangers	7	1	0	6	6	14	−8	3	

Source: Irish League Archive

=== Section B ===
Pos	Team	Pld	W	D	L	GF	GA	GD	Pts	Result
1	Glentoran	7	5	2	0	16	4	+12	17	Advance to semi-final
2	Newry Town	7	5	1	1	19	8	+11	16	Advance to semi-final
3	Glenavon	7	3	3	1	12	9	+3	12	
4	Bangor	7	3	0	4	8	14	−6	9	
5	Distillery	7	2	0	5	7	10	−3	6	
6	Cliftonville	7	1	3	3	7	10	−3	6	
7	Ards	7	1	1	5	8	15	−7	4	

Source: Irish League Archive

== Semi-finals ==
Team 1	Score	Team 2
Linfield	2–0	Newry Town
Portadown	2–2 (a.e.t.) (3–0 p)	Glentoran

== Final ==
1 November 1988

Linfield	1–0	Portadown
L. McKeown 50' (pen.)		Curliss (red card) 89'

The Oval, Belfast
Attendance: 8,000
Referee: Leslie Irvine (Limavady)
