= 1950–51 Gold Cup =

Tournament details
- Country: Northern Ireland
- Teams: 12

Final positions
- Champions: Linfield (15th win)
- Runners-up: Glentoran

Tournament statistics
- Matches played: 13
- Goals scored: 48 (3.69 per match)

The 1950–51 Gold Cup was the 32nd edition of the Gold Cup, a cup competition in Northern Irish football.

The tournament was won by Linfield for the 15th time and 3rd consecutive season, defeating Glentoran 5–1 in the final at Solitude.

== Results ==
=== First round ===
Team 1	Score	Team 2
Ards	1–3	Glentoran
Coleraine	2–4	Bangor
Crusaders	4–0	Derry City
Portadown	1–1	Linifield
Ballymena United	bye	
Cliftonville	bye	
Distillery	bye	
Glenavon	bye	

==== Replay ====
Team 1	Score	Team 2
Linfield	3–1	Portadown

=== Quarter-finals ===
Team 1	Score	Team 2
Cliftonville	2–3	Ballymena United
Crusaders	3–2	Glenavon
Glentoran	3–1	Distillery
Linfield	1–0	Bangor

=== Semi-finals ===
Team 1	Score	Team 2
Glentoran	1–0	Crusaders
Linfield	4–1	Ballymena United

=== Final ===
20 September 1950

Linfield	5–1	Glentoran
Coulter 11', 67', 85'; Dickson 20', 41'	Report	McCarthy 13'

Solitude, Belfast
