= 1919–20 Gold Cup =

Tournament details
- Country: Ireland
- Teams: 8

Final positions
- Champions: Distillery (2nd win)
- Runners-up: Glentoran

Tournament statistics
- Matches played: 8
- Goals scored: 24 (3 per match)

The 1919–20 Gold Cup was the 8th edition of the Gold Cup, a cup competition in Irish football.

The tournament was won by Distillery for the 2nd time, defeating Glentoran 3–1 in the final at Windsor Park.

== Results ==
=== Quarter-finals ===
Team 1	Score	Team 2
Bohemians	1–3	Shelbourne
Glenavon	1–1	Distillery
Glentoran	2–0	Belfast Celtic
Linfield	2–0	Cliftonville

==== Replay ====
Team 1	Score	Team 2
Distillery	2–1	Glenavon

=== Semi-finals ===
Team 1	Score	Team 2
Distillery	3–1	Shelbourne
Glentoran	3–0	Linfield

=== Final ===
15 May 1920

Distillery	3–1	Glentoran
Robinson; Watson; Burnison (pen.)	Report	Gowdy

Windsor Park, Belfast
Referee: W. McLean
