= 1932–33 Gold Cup =

Tournament details
- Country: Northern Ireland
- Teams: 14

Final positions
- Champions: Cliftonville (2nd win)
- Runners-up: Linfield

Tournament statistics
- Matches played: 16
- Goals scored: 71 (4.44 per match)

The 1932–33 Gold Cup was the 21st edition of the Gold Cup, a cup competition in Northern Irish football.

The tournament was won by Cliftonville for the 2nd time, defeating Linfield 2–1 in the final at Celtic Park.

== Results ==
=== First round ===
Team 1	Score	Team 2
Ards	1–3	Glentoran
Ballymena	5–1	Larne
Coleraine	6–3	Glenavon
Derry City	3–1	Bangor
Distillery	2–1	Newry Town
Linfield	1–1	Belfast Celtic
Portadown	2–2	Cliftonville

==== Replay ====
Team 1	Score	Team 2
Belfast Celtic	1–4	Linfield
Cliftonville	3–2	Portadown

=== Quarter-finals ===
Team 1	Score	Team 2
Cliftonville	4–3	Coleraine
Glentoran	2–1	Derry City
Linfield	3–0	Distillery
Ballymena	bye	

=== Semi-finals ===
Team 1	Score	Team 2
Cliftonville	4–2	Glentoran
Linfield	2–2	Ballymena

==== Replay ====
Team 1	Score	Team 2
Linfield	2–1	Ballymena

=== Final ===
14 December 1932

Cliftonville	2–1	Linfield
E. Mitchell 31'; McCaw 85'	Report	Jones 6'

Celtic Park, Belfast
