= 1921–22 Gold Cup =

Tournament details
- Country: Northern Ireland
- Teams: 6

Final positions
- Champions: Linfield (5th win)
- Runners-up: Cliftonville

Tournament statistics
- Matches played: 30
- Goals scored: 100 (3.33 per match)

The 1921–22 Gold Cup was the 10th edition of the Gold Cup, a cup competition in Northern Irish football.

The tournament was won by Linfield for the 5th time and 2nd consecutive year.

== Group standings ==
Pos	Team	Pld	W	D	L	GF	GA	GR	Pts	Result
1	Linfield (C)	10	9	0	1	25	5	5.000	18	Champions
2	Cliftonville	10	5	2	3	21	23	0.913	12	
3	Glentoran	10	4	2	4	17	20	0.850	10	
4	Queen's Island	10	3	2	5	12	14	0.857	8	
5	Glenavon	10	3	2	5	13	16	0.813	8	
6	Distillery	10	1	2	7	12	22	0.545	4	

Source: Irish League Archive
(C) Champions

== Results ==
Home \ Away	CLI	DIS	GLA	GLT	LIN	QUE
Cliftonville		4–3	2–2	4–2	1–3	3–2
Distillery	1–2		1–1	1–4	1–3	1–1
Glenavon	1–3	2–1		3–2	0–3	2–0
Glentoran	2–2	2–0	4–0		1–0	0–1
Linfield	3–0	2–1	2–0	5–1		2–0
Queen's Island	4–0	1–2	1–0	2–2	0–2	

Source: Irish League Archive
Legend: Blue = home team win; Yellow = draw; Red = away team win.
