= 1969–70 Gold Cup =

Tournament details
- Country: Northern Ireland
- Teams: 12

Final positions
- Champions: Coleraine (3rd win)
- Runners-up: Glentoran

Tournament statistics
- Matches played: 16
- Goals scored: 56 (3.5 per match)

The 1969–70 Gold Cup was the 51st edition of the Gold Cup, a cup competition in Northern Irish football.

The tournament was won by Coleraine for the 3rd time, defeating Glentoran 1–0 in the final at Windsor Park.

== Results ==
=== First round ===
Team 1	Score	Team 2
Coleraine	6–3	Cliftonville
Derry City	1–1	Ards
Distillery	0–4	Glentoran
Portadown	2–1	Bangor
Ballymena United	bye	
Crusaders	bye	
Glenavon	bye	
Linfield	bye	

==== Replay ====
Team 1	Score	Team 2
Ards	1–2	Derry City

=== Quarter-finals ===
Team 1	Score	Team 2
Coleraine	2–2	Portadown
Crusaders	1–0	Linfield
Glenavon	2–2	Ballymena United
Glentoran	1–1	Derry City

==== Replays ====
Team 1	Score	Team 2
Ballymena United	2–1	Glenavon
Derry City	1–3	Glentoran
Portadown	0–0	Coleraine

==== Second replay ====
Team 1	Score	Team 2
Coleraine	6–1	Portadown

=== Semi-finals ===
Team 1	Score	Team 2
Coleraine	3–1	Ballymena United
Glentoran	4–1	Crusaders

=== Final ===
9 December 1969

Coleraine	1–0	Glentoran
Jennings 55'	Report

Windsor Park, Belfast
Referee: Jack Adair (Belfast)
