= 1987–88 Gold Cup =

Tournament details
- Country: Northern Ireland
- Teams: 14

Final positions
- Champions: Linfield (30th win)
- Runners-up: Newry Town

Tournament statistics
- Matches played: 52
- Goals scored: 156 (3 per match)

The 1987–88 Gold Cup was the 69th edition of the Gold Cup, a cup competition in Northern Irish football.

The tournament was won by Linfield for the 30th time, defeating Newry Town 3–0 in the final at The Oval.

The format was again changed for this season, with each team playing the other teams in their section once plus one match against a team from the other section. The top two from each section progressed to the semi-finals.

== Group standings ==
=== Section A ===
| Pos | Team | Pld | W | D | L | GF | GA | GD | Pts | Result |
|---|---|---|---|---|---|---|---|---|---|---|
| 1 | Linfield | 7 | 6 | 1 | 0 | 28 | 4 | +24 | 19 | Advance to semi-final |
| 2 | Larne | 7 | 4 | 1 | 2 | 14 | 7 | +7 | 13 | Advance to semi-final |
| 3 | Ballymena United | 7 | 3 | 0 | 4 | 7 | 11 | −4 | 9 | |
| 4 | Crusaders | 7 | 3 | 0 | 4 | 7 | 11 | −4 | 9 | |
| 5 | Portadown | 7 | 3 | 0 | 4 | 6 | 14 | −8 | 9 | |
| 6 | Coleraine | 7 | 2 | 1 | 4 | 9 | 12 | −3 | 7 | |
| 7 | Carrick Rangers | 7 | 2 | 1 | 4 | 6 | 15 | −9 | 7 | |

Source: Irish League Archive

=== Section B ===
| Pos | Team | Pld | W | D | L | GF | GA | GD | Pts | Result |
|---|---|---|---|---|---|---|---|---|---|---|
| 1 | Newry Town | 7 | 6 | 0 | 1 | 13 | 2 | +11 | 18 | Advance to semi-final |
| 2 | Glentoran | 7 | 5 | 0 | 2 | 19 | 9 | +10 | 15 | Advance to semi-final |
| 3 | Distillery | 7 | 3 | 1 | 3 | 9 | 16 | −7 | 10 | |
| 4 | Cliftonville | 7 | 3 | 0 | 4 | 10 | 10 | 0 | 9 | |
| 5 | Glenavon | 7 | 2 | 1 | 4 | 9 | 11 | −2 | 7 | |
| 6 | Bangor | 7 | 2 | 0 | 5 | 6 | 16 | −10 | 6 | |
| 7 | Ards | 7 | 1 | 2 | 4 | 5 | 10 | −5 | 5 | |

Source: Irish League Archive

== Semi-finals ==
| Team 1 | Score | Team 2 |
|---|---|---|
| Glentoran | 2–0 | Larne |
| Linfield | 2–1 | Ards |

== Final ==
14 November 1987

| Linfield | 3–0 | Newry Town |
|---|---|---|
| McGaughey 17', 42'; Baxter 39'; Knell (red card) 44' | Report | Buchanan (red card) 44' |

The Oval, Belfast
Attendance: 5,000
Referee: Sidney Spence (Lambeg)
