= 1935–36 Gold Cup =

Tournament details
- Country: Northern Ireland
- Teams: 14

Final positions
- Champions: Linfield (11th win)
- Runners-up: Distillery

Tournament statistics
- Matches played: 16
- Goals scored: 58 (3.63 per match)

The 1935–36 Gold Cup was the 24th edition of the Gold Cup, a cup competition in Northern Irish football.

The tournament was won by Linfield for the 11th time, defeating Distillery 3–0 in the final at Celtic Park.

== Results ==
=== First round ===
Team 1	Score	Team 2
Ards	1–3	Belfast Celtic
Cliftonville	2–4	Ballymena United
Coleraine	1–2	Distillery
Glentoran	5–0	Glenavon
Larne	1–3	Portadown
Linfield	4–0	Bangor
Newry Town	0–2	Derry City

=== Quarter-finals ===
Team 1	Score	Team 2
Ballymena United	3–2	Glentoran
Derry City	1–1	Linfield
Distillery	2–1	Belfast Celtic
Portadown	bye	

==== Replay ====
Team 1	Score	Team 2
Linfield	4–1	Derry City

=== Semi-finals ===
Team 1	Score	Team 2
Distillery	2–1	Ballymena United
Linfield	0–0	Portadown

==== Replay ====
Team 1	Score	Team 2
Linfield	2–2 (a.e.t.)	Portadown

==== Second replay ====
Team 1	Score	Team 2
Linfield	4–1	Portadown

=== Final ===
1 January 1936

Linfield	3–0	Distillery
Ruddy 15', 57'; Edwards 89'	Report

Celtic Park, Belfast
Referee: H. E. Hull (Stockport)
