= 1980–81 Gold Cup =

Tournament details
- Country: Northern Ireland
- Teams: 12

Final positions
- Champions: Cliftonville (3rd win)
- Runners-up: Linfield

Tournament statistics
- Matches played: 31
- Goals scored: 103 (3.32 per match)

The 1980–81 Gold Cup was the 62nd edition of the Gold Cup, a cup competition in Northern Irish football.

The tournament was won by Cliftonville for the 3rd time, defeating Linfield 3–1 in the final at Windsor Park.

== Group standings ==
=== Section A ===
| Pos | Team | Pld | W | D | L | GF | GA | GR | Pts | Result |
|---|---|---|---|---|---|---|---|---|---|---|
| 1 | Linfield | 5 | 4 | 1 | 0 | 14 | 4 | 3.500 | 9 | Advance to final |
| 2 | Glenavon | 5 | 4 | 1 | 0 | 13 | 3 | 4.333 | 9 | |
| 3 | Portadown | 5 | 2 | 1 | 2 | 8 | 8 | 1.000 | 5 | |
| 4 | Bangor | 5 | 2 | 0 | 3 | 6 | 10 | 0.600 | 4 | |
| 5 | Ards | 5 | 1 | 0 | 4 | 2 | 12 | 0.167 | 2 | |
| 6 | Distillery | 5 | 0 | 1 | 4 | 5 | 11 | 0.455 | 1 | |

Source: Irish League Archive

=== Section B ===
| Pos | Team | Pld | W | D | L | GF | GA | GR | Pts | Result |
|---|---|---|---|---|---|---|---|---|---|---|
| 1 | Cliftonville | 5 | 3 | 1 | 1 | 11 | 6 | 1.833 | 7 | Advance to final |
| 2 | Glentoran | 5 | 3 | 1 | 1 | 10 | 5 | 2.000 | 7 | |
| 3 | Ballymena United | 5 | 1 | 3 | 1 | 11 | 10 | 1.100 | 5 | |
| 4 | Coleraine | 5 | 1 | 3 | 1 | 8 | 10 | 0.800 | 5 | |
| 5 | Crusaders | 5 | 1 | 1 | 3 | 8 | 10 | 0.800 | 3 | |
| 6 | Larne | 5 | 1 | 1 | 3 | 3 | 10 | 0.300 | 3 | |

Source: Irish League Archive

== Final ==
2 December 1980

| Linfield | 1–3 | Cliftonville |
|---|---|---|
| Feeney 44' | Report | Moffatt 16'; McCurry 42'; Platt 79' |

Windsor Park, Belfast
Attendance: 10,000
Referee: Hugh Wilson (Belfast)
