= 1939–40 Gold Cup =

Tournament details
- Country: Northern Ireland
- Teams: 14

Final positions
- Champions: Belfast Celtic (5th win)
- Runners-up: Linfield

Tournament statistics
- Matches played: 18
- Goals scored: 77 (4.28 per match)

The 1939–40 Gold Cup was the 28th edition of the Gold Cup, a cup competition in Northern Irish football.

The tournament was won by Belfast Celtic for the 5th time and 2nd consecutive season, defeating Linfield 1–0 in the final at Grosvenor Park.

== Results ==
=== First round ===
Team 1	Score	Team 2
Bangor	2–5	Linfield
Coleraine	5–2	Cliftonville
Derry City	3–1	Larne
Distillery	4–2	Ards
Glenavon	2–2	Belfast Celtic
Glentoran	3–4	Portadown
Newry Town	5–2	Ballymena United

==== Replay ====
Team 1	Score	Team 2
Belfast Celtic	3–0	Glenavon

=== Quarter-finals ===
Team 1	Score	Team 2
Belfast Celtic	1–1	Newry Town
Linfield	2–0	Distillery
Portadown	3–3	Coleraine
Derry City	bye	

==== Replays ====
Team 1	Score	Team 2
Coleraine	3–1	Portadown
Newry Town	1–1	Belfast Celtic

==== Second replay ====
Team 1	Score	Team 2
Belfast Celtic	6–0	Newry Town

=== Semi-finals ===
Team 1	Score	Team 2
Belfast Celtic	2–1	Derry City
Linfield	2–2	Coleraine

==== Replay ====
Team 1	Score	Team 2
Linfield	2–0	Coleraine

=== Final ===
6 December 1939

Belfast Celtic	1–0	Linfield
Kernaghan 65'; O'Connor (red card) 75'	Report	Perry (red card) 75'

Grosvenor Park, Belfast
Attendance: 10,000
