= Jimmy Walker (footballer, born 1932) =

Northern Ireland footballer (born 1932)

Personal information
- Full name: James Walker
- Date of birth: 29 March 1932
- Place of birth: Belfast, Northern Ireland
- Height: 5 ft 10 in (1.78 m)
- Position: Forward

Youth career
- Ledley Hall

Senior career*
Years	Team	Apps	(Gls)
1950–1951	Glentoran		
1951–1954	Linfield		
1954–1957	Doncaster Rovers	47	(19)
1957–1960	Portadown		
1960–1961	Linfield		
1961	Crusaders		

International career
1955	Northern Ireland	1	(1)
- * Club domestic league appearances and goals

James Walker (born 29 March 1932) is a Northern Irish former professional footballer who played as a forward.

== Career ==
Born in Belfast, Walker played for Ledley Hall, Glentoran, Linfield, Doncaster Rovers, Portadown and Crusaders. He also earned one cap for the Northern Ireland national team.
