= 1983–84 County Antrim Shield =

Tournament details
- Country: Northern Ireland
- Teams: 13

Final positions
- Champions: Linfield (35th win)
- Runners-up: Crusaders

Tournament statistics
- Matches played: 12
- Goals scored: 48 (4 per match)

The 1983–84 County Antrim Shield was the 95th edition of the County Antrim Shield, a cup competition in Northern Irish football.

Linfield won the tournament for the 35th time and 4th season in a row, defeating Crusaders 3–1 in the final.

== Results ==
=== First round ===
Team 1	Score	Team 2
Ballymena United	2–2 (a.e.t.) (5–4 p)	Ards
Carrick Rangers	0–5	Distillery
Cliftonville	1–1 (a.e.t.) (4–3 p)	Carrick Rangers Reserves
Glentoran	0–2	Ballyclare Comrades
Linfield Swifts	4–2	Larne
Bangor	bye	
Crusaders	bye	
Linfield	bye	

=== Quarter-finals ===
Team 1	Score	Team 2
Bangor	1–0	Ballyclare Comrades
Cliftonville	2–1	Distillery
Crusaders	2–1	Ballymena United
Linfield	9–0	Linfield Swifts

=== Semi-finals ===
Team 1	Score	Team 2
Crusaders	3–2	Cliftonville
Linfield	3–1	Bangor

=== Final ===
30 April 1984

Crusaders	1–3	Linfield
Barr 40'		Jeffrey 11'; Murray 41' (pen.); Anderson 81'

Seaview, Belfast
Referee: G. Nesbitt (Newtownabbey)
