= 1901–02 Irish Cup =

Tournament details
- Country: Ireland
- Date: 16 November 1901 – 15 March 1902
- Teams: 14

Final positions
- Champions: Linfield (7th win)
- Runners-up: Distillery

Tournament statistics
- Matches played: 15
- Goals scored: 59 (3.93 per match)

The 1901–02 Irish Cup was the 22nd edition of the Irish Cup, the premier knock-out cup competition in Irish football.

Linfield won the tournament for the 7th time, defeating Distillery 5–1 in the final.

== Results ==
=== First round ===
Team 1	Score	Team 2
Belfast Celtic	1–2	Distillery
Cliftonville	1–0	Glentoran
Derry Celtic	6–0	St Columb's Court
Linfield	5–2	Ulster
Richmond Rovers	3–0	Liverpool Regiment
Shelbourne	2–2	Tritonville
Bohemians	bye	
Freebooters	bye	

==== Replay ====
Team 1	Score	Team 2
Tritonville	0–3	Shelbourne

=== Quarter-finals ===
Team 1	Score	Team 2
Derry Celtic	1–4	Bohemians
Distillery	2–1^{1}	Cliftonville
Freebooters	0–5	Linfield
Richmond Rovers	2-1	Shelbourne

^{1} A replay was ordered after a protest.

==== Replay ====
Team 1	Score	Team 2
Distillery	2–0	Cliftonville

=== Semi-finals ===
Team 1	Score	Team 2
Distillery	5–3	Richmond Rovers
Linfield	2–0	Bohemians

=== Final ===
15 March 1902

Linfield	5–1	Distillery
Mercer; Milne; Peden	Report	Cairns

Solitude, Belfast
