= 1983–84 Irish League =

Irish League
- Season: 1983–84
- Champions: Linfield; 36th Irish title
- Matches played: 182
- Goals scored: 522 (2.87 per match)
- Top goalscorer: Martin McGaughey; Trevor Anderson (15 goals each)

Location of teams in the Irish League from 1983–1990
Location of Belfast-based teams in the Irish League from 1983–1990

The 1983–84 Irish League was the 83rd edition of the Irish League, the highest level of league competition in Northern Irish football. The league consisted of 14 teams, an increase of two on the previous season, with Carrick Rangers and Newry Town becoming the first new participants in the league since the 1972–73 season. The league title was won by Linfield for the third consecutive time.

== League standings ==
Pos	Team	Pld	W	D	L	GF	GA	GD	Pts	Qualification
1	Linfield (C)	26	22	1	3	76	23	+53	45	Qualification for the European Cup first round
2	Glentoran	26	18	6	2	65	19	+46	42	Qualification for the UEFA Cup first round
3	Cliftonville	26	12	7	7	28	23	+5	31	
4	Ards	26	9	11	6	32	26	+6	29	
5	Coleraine	26	11	6	9	44	34	+10	28	
6	Ballymena United	26	10	8	8	32	30	+2	28	Qualification for the European Cup Winners' Cup first round
7	Glenavon	26	10	7	9	41	33	+8	27	
8	Crusaders	26	11	5	10	38	41	−3	27	
9	Distillery	26	11	4	11	35	42	−7	26	
10	Portadown	26	9	6	11	28	31	−3	24	
11	Newry Town	26	8	3	15	30	48	−18	19	
12	Bangor	26	4	6	16	24	57	−33	14	
13	Larne	26	7	1	18	25	58	−33	13 (Note: 2 points deducted)	
14	Carrick Rangers	26	3	3	20	24	57	−33	9	

Source: rsssf.com
(C) Champions

== Results ==
Home \ Away	ARD	BAN	BLM	CRK	CLI	COL	CRU	DIS	GLV	GLT	LRN	LIN	NEW	POR
Ards		1–0	3–0	2–1	0–0	0–0	1–1	1–0	0–3	0–0	2–0	0–2	2–0	0–0
Bangor	2–2		1–2	4–1	1–2	0–1	1–0	0–2	0–5	1–4	1–0	1–4	1–2	2–1
Ballymena United	2–0	1–1		2–2	0–0	1–2	2–1	0–2	2–2	1–4	2–1	1–2	2–0	2–1
Carrick Rangers	0–1	1–1	1–0		1–2	0–3	2–3	1–2	3–0	0–2	0–3	0–3	2–2	1–3
Cliftonville	1–1	1–0	0–3	1–0		0–0	0–1	1–0	2–0	0–1	0–3	0–1	3–1	0–1
Coleraine	5–3	3–1	0–0	0–3	2–2		1–2	4–1	1–1	0–1	4–0	1–2	4–1	0–0
Crusaders	0–0	3–3	2–1	1–0	1–4	3–1		2–3	1–1	2–3	3–1	3–1	1–2	1–0
Distillery	2–1	0–0	0–1	3–2	0–2	2–1	2–0		1–4	0–4	3–0	2–7	2–1	2–2
Glenavon	2–1	1–1	1–3	2–1	0–0	3–1	2–3	1–1		1–3	1–0	0–1	0–1	3–1
Glentoran	3–3	6–0	0–0	6–1	1–2	1–0	1–0	1–1	1–1		9–2	4–1	5–0	2–0
Larne	1–1	3–1	0–1	2–0	2–0	1–4	2–1	0–2	0–3	0–2		1–2	2–1	0–1
Linfield	1–1	4–1	1–0	3–1	0–1	6–1	6–1	3–1	2–1	3–0	8–0		3–0	3–0
Newry Town	0–4	2–0	2–2	4–0	2–3	0–3	1–1	2–1	1–2	0–1	2–0	1–3		0–1
Portadown	0–2	5–0	1–1	2–0	1–1	0–2	0–1	1–0	2–1	0–0	4–1	1–4	0–2	

Source: Irish League Archive
Legend: Blue = home team win; Yellow = draw; Red = away team win.
