= 1931–32 County Antrim Shield =

Tournament details
- Country: Northern Ireland
- Teams: 11

Final positions
- Champions: Linfield (14th win)
- Runners-up: Belfast Celtic

Tournament statistics
- Matches played: 13
- Goals scored: 47 (3.62 per match)

The 1931–32 County Antrim Shield was the 43rd edition of the County Antrim Shield, a cup competition in Northern Irish football.

Linfield won the tournament for the 14th time, defeating Belfast Celtic 5–1 in the final at The Oval.

== Results ==
=== First round ===
| Team 1 | Score | Team 2 |
|---|---|---|
| Ards | 1–1 | Distillery |
| Ballymena | 4–1 | Brantwood |
| Linfield | 4–1 | Larne |
| Bangor | bye | |
| Belfast Celtic | bye | |
| Cliftonville | bye | |
| Dunmurry | bye | |
| Glentoran | bye | |

==== Replay ====
| Team 1 | Score | Team 2 |
|---|---|---|
| Distillery | 0–2 | Ards |

=== Quarter-finals ===
| Team 1 | Score | Team 2 |
|---|---|---|
| Belfast Celtic | 2–0 | Ballymena |
| Cliftonville | 2–2 | Ards |
| Glentoran | 1–0 | Dunmurry |
| Linfield | 4–0 | Larne |

==== Replay ====
| Team 1 | Score | Team 2 |
|---|---|---|
| Ards | 4–2 | Cliftonville |

=== Semi-finals ===
| Team 1 | Score | Team 2 |
|---|---|---|
| Belfast Celtic | 1–1 | Ards |
| Linfield | 2–0 | Glentoran |

==== Replay ====
| Team 1 | Score | Team 2 |
|---|---|---|
| Belfast Celtic | 6–1 | Ards |

=== Final ===
20 April 1932

| Linfield | 5–1 | Belfast Celtic |
|---|---|---|
| Bambrick 21'; Donnelly 70'; Edwards 75'; Jones 85', 88' | Report | Martin 41' |

The Oval, Belfast
Referee: J. Thompson (Burnbank)
