= 1903–04 Irish Cup =

Tournament details
- Country: Ireland
- Date: 7 November 1903 – 17 March 1904
- Teams: 13

Final positions
- Champions: Linfield (8th win)
- Runners-up: Derry Celtic

Tournament statistics
- Matches played: 13
- Goals scored: 49 (3.77 per match)

The 1903–04 Irish Cup was the 24th edition of the Irish Cup, the premier knock-out cup competition in Irish football.

Linfield won the tournament for the 8th time, defeating Derry Celtic 5–0 in the final.

== Results ==
=== First round ===
Team 1	Score	Team 2
Belfast Celtic	6–0	King's Own Scottish Borderers
Cliftonville	3–0	Inniskilling Fusiliers
Distillery	1–1	Bohemians
Linfield	3–0	Glentoran
Shelbourne	1–3	Freebooters
Warwickshire Regiment	1–2	Derry Hibernians
Derry Celtic	bye	

==== Replay ====
Team 1	Score	Team 2
Bohemians	1–0	Distillery

=== Quarter-finals ===
Team 1	Score	Team 2
Bohemians	0–2	Derry Celtic
Cliftonville	1–0	Belfast Celtic
Linfield	3–3	Freebooters
Derry Hibernians	bye	

=== Semi-finals ===
Team 1	Score	Team 2
Derry Celtic	9–3	Derry Hibernians
Linfield	1–0	Cliftonville

=== Final ===
17 March 1904

Linfield	5–0	Derry Celtic
Hagan; Milne; Darling	Report

Grosvenor Park, Belfast
