= 1934–35 Irish League =

Irish League
- Season: 1934–35
- Champions: Linfield; 18th Irish title
- Matches: 182
- Goals: 780 (4.29 per match)

Location of teams in the Irish League from 1934–40
Location of Belfast-based teams in the Irish League from 1934–40

The 1934–35 Irish League was the 41st edition of the Irish League, the highest level of league competition in Northern Irish football. The league comprised 14 teams, and Linfield won the championship.

== League standings ==
Pos	Team	Pld	W	D	L	GF	GA	GR	Pts	Result
1	Linfield (C)	26	21	4	1	76	19	4.000	46	Champions
2	Derry City	26	18	4	4	64	32	2.000	40	
3	Belfast Celtic	26	17	3	6	96	36	2.667	37	
4	Glentoran	26	16	4	6	70	42	1.667	36	
5	Portadown	26	14	5	7	56	38	1.474	33	
6	Distillery	26	11	5	10	47	44	1.068	27	
7	Larne	26	11	5	10	48	52	0.923	27	
8	Glenavon	26	7	7	12	43	55	0.782	21	
9	Newry Town	26	9	1	16	63	73	0.863	19	
10	Ballymena United	26	7	5	14	48	65	0.738	19	
11	Cliftonville	26	8	3	15	45	69	0.652	19	
12	Coleraine	26	7	2	17	43	66	0.652	16	
13	Ards	26	5	3	18	45	91	0.495	13	
14	Bangor	26	2	7	17	36	98	0.367	11	

Source: rsssf.com
(C) Champions

== Results ==
Home \ Away	ARD	BAN	BLM	BCE	CLI	COL	DER	DIS	GLV	GLT	LAR	LIN	NEW	POR
Ards		8–1	2–2	1–4	2–5	2–0	0–3	1–3	2–2	3–4	1–2	0–4	5–2	4–4
Bangor	1–4		1–4	0–7	1–2	4–0	1–5	3–2	1–1	2–7	2–2	0–4	0–3	1–2
Ballymena United	5–1	4–4		0–3	5–1	3–1	0–2	1–4	5–1	0–3	1–1	1–3	5–2	1–3
Belfast Celtic	9–0	8–1	3–0		6–2	5–1	4–1	5–2	1–1	3–1	2–3	1–2	8–2	1–1
Cliftonville	8–2	0–0	4–1	1–4		1–3	2–1	1–1	1–4	3–2	2–2	0–1	3–2	0–5
Coleraine	3–0	0–0	2–1	1–2	3–1		1–3	0–2	2–1	0–2	3–4	1–1	4–1	2–4
Derry City	4–2	5–3	7–3	2–1	3–0	5–2		3–1	2–1	2–2	2–1	1–2	3–0	2–0
Distillery	2–1	0–0	3–2	1–7	0–1	3–1	1–1		1–3	2–0	1–0	1–1	2–1	0–1
Glenavon	1–0	5–0	1–1	2–3	2–1	4–2	0–1	2–2		2–2	1–3	1–3	4–2	0–2
Glentoran	6–0	5–3	1–1	3–2	4–1	2–1	2–1	1–3	3–1		4–1	2–2	4–3	2–1
Larne	3–0	3–0	4–0	0–0	4–2	3–2	1–1	0–5	3–2	0–4		2–5	2–1	1–2
Linfield	6–0	7–1	6–0	2–1	5–0	5–2	0–0	2–1	3–0	1–0	2–1		3–0	3–1
Newry Town	2–3	7–3	2–0	2–5	2–1	5–2	2–3	5–4	8–0	1–3	4–1	2–1		0–2
Portadown	5–1	3–3	0–2	4–1	4–2	2–4	0–1	1–0	1–1	3–1	3–1	0–2	2–2	

Source: Irish League Archive
Legend: Blue = home team win; Yellow = draw; Red = away team win.
