= 1906–07 Irish League =

Irish League
- Season: 1906–07
- Dates: 1 September 1906 – 15 May 1907
- Champions: Linfield; 8th Irish title
- Matches played: 56
- Goals scored: 168 (3 per match)
- Biggest home win: Linfield 7–0 Shelbourne
- Biggest away win: Derry Celtic 0–4 Bohemians
- Highest scoring: Distillery 6–3 Belfast Celtic

The 1906–07 Irish League was the 17th edition of the Irish League, the highest level of league competition in Irish football.

The league comprised eight teams, and Linfield won the championship for the 8th time.

== Teams and locations ==
Location of teams in the 1906–07 Irish League season
Location of Belfast teams in the 1906–07 Irish League season
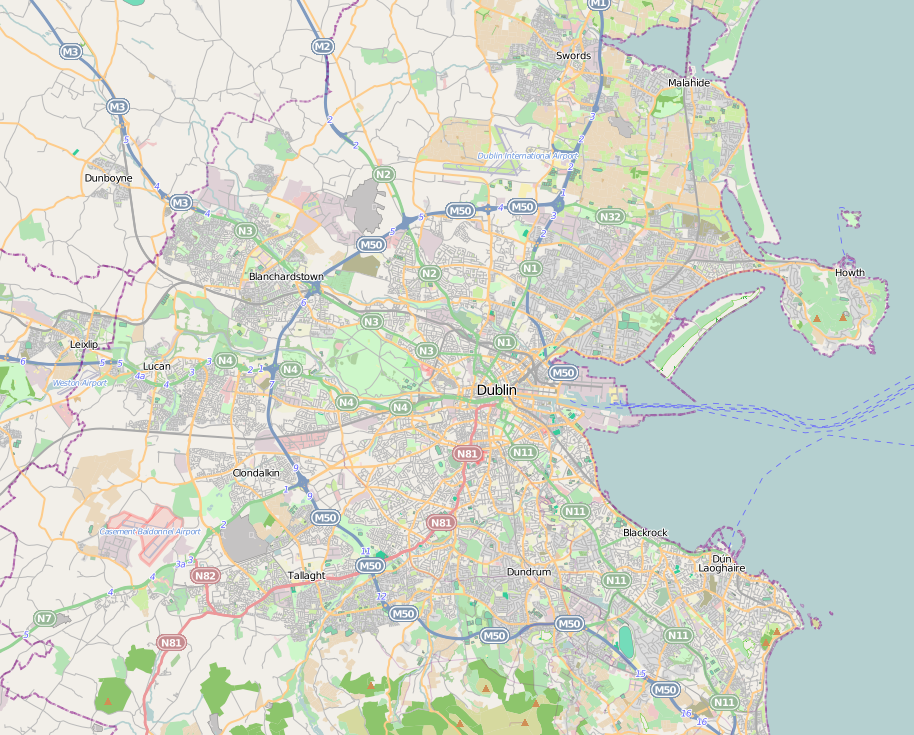
Location of Dublin teams in the 1906–07 Irish League

Team	Town	Home Ground
Belfast Celtic	Belfast	Celtic Park
Bohemians	Dublin	Dalymount Park
Cliftonville	Belfast	Solitude
Derry Celtic	Derry	Brandywell
Distillery	Belfast	Grosvenor Park
Glentoran	Belfast	The Oval
Linfield	Belfast	Windsor Park
Shelbourne	Dublin	Sandymount Road

== League standings ==
Pos	Team	Pld	W	D	L	GF	GA	GR	Pts	Result
1	Linfield (C)	14	10	3	1	30	9	3.333	23	Champions
2	Shelbourne	14	8	3	3	27	21	1.286	19	
3	Distillery	14	6	4	4	27	22	1.227	16	
4	Cliftonville	14	4	6	4	18	16	1.125	14	
5	Bohemians	14	4	5	5	19	22	0.864	13	
6	Belfast Celtic	14	4	3	7	18	25	0.720	11	
7	Glentoran	14	2	5	7	18	25	0.720	9	
8	Derry Celtic	14	2	3	9	11	28	0.393	7	

Source: rsssf.com
(C) Champions

== Results ==
Home \ Away	BCE	BOH	CLI	DCE	DIS	GLT	LIN	SHE
Belfast Celtic		0–2	0–1	1–0	3–1	4–2	0–1	1–2
Bohemians	2–3		1–0	1–1	1–1	1–1	2–4	1–3
Cliftonville	0–0	2–2		5–1	2–1	2–1	0–1	1–1
Derry Celtic	1–1	0–4	1–1		1–2	3–1	2–3	1–0
Distillery	6–3	0–0	3–1	2–0		3–2	2–1	2–2
Glentoran	3–0	1–2	1–1	2–0	1–1		0–2	2–2
Linfield	1–1	3–0	1–1	3–0	1–0	1–1		7–0
Shelbourne	3–1	3–0	2–1	2–0	4–3	3–0	0–1	

Source: Irish League Archive
Legend: Blue = home team win; Yellow = draw; Red = away team win.
