= 1929–30 Irish Cup =

Tournament details
- Country: Northern Ireland
- Teams: 16

Final positions
- Champions: Linfield (16th win)
- Runners-up: Ballymena

Tournament statistics
- Matches played: 22
- Goals scored: 94 (4.27 per match)

The 1929–30 Irish Cup was the 50th edition of the Irish Cup, the premier knock-out cup competition in Northern Irish football.

Linfield won the tournament for the 16th time, defeating holders Ballymena 4–3 in the final at Celtic Park.

== Results ==
=== First round ===
Team 1	Score	Team 2
Bangor	4–4	Belfast Celtic
Coleraine	2–1	Linfield Swifts
Derry City	1–4	Ballymena
Distillery	0–0	Linfield
Dunmurry Recreation	1–1	Glentoran
Glenavon	2–2	Cliftonville
Newry Town	5–0	Ards
Portadown	1–2	Larne

==== Replay ====
Team 1	Score	Team 2
Belfast Celtic	5–2	Bangor
Ciftonville	1–1	Glenavon
Glentoran	1–1	Dunmurry Recreation
Linfield	3–1	Distillery

==== Second replay ====
Team 1	Score	Team 2
Dunmurry Recreation	1–4	Glentoran
Glenavon	5–3	Cliftonville

=== Quarter-finals ===
Team 1	Score	Team 2
Belfast Celtic	2–3	Ballymena
Coleraine	0–1	Linfield
Glenavon	1–2	Newry Town
Larne	2–2	Glentoran

==== Replay ====
Team 1	Score	Team 2
Glentoran	4–2	Larne

=== Semi-finals ===
Team 1	Score	Team 2
Ballymena	3–2	Newry Town
Linfield	2–1	Glentoran

=== Final ===
29 March 1930

Linfield	4–3	Ballymena
Bambrick 30', 39', 62', 83'	Report	Reid 44'; Shiels 55', 74'

Celtic Park, Belfast
Referee: A. Josephs
