= Eric Bowyer =

Northern Irish footballer

Personal information
- Positions: Half-back; defender

Senior career*
Years	Team	Apps	(Gls)
1967–1978	Linfield		
1978–1981	Glenavon		
1981–1982	Bangor		
1982–1983	Brantwood		
- Dungannon Swifts
- Carrick Rangers

International career
1970	Irish League XI	2	(0)

Managerial career
- 1990–1992: Linfield
- * Club domestic league appearances and goals

Eric Bowyer is a Northern Irish former footballer and manager who played in the Irish League with Linfield, Glenavon, Bangor and Carrick Rangers in the 1960s, 1970s and 1980s. He was named as the Ulster Footballer of the Year for 1974–75. Bowyer also won Linfield Player of the Year 4 times between 1968 and 1976. He was both a captain and manager of Linfield. At Linfield, he won three League titles and won the Irish Cup once.

== Sources ==
- M. Brodie (ed.), Northern Ireland Soccer Yearbook 2009-2010, p. 102. Belfast:Ulster Tatler Publications
- Irish League Footballing Greats
