= 1931–32 Irish League =

Irish League
- Season: 1931–32
- Champions: Linfield; 16th Irish title
- Matches played: 182
- Goals scored: 796 (4.37 per match)

Location of teams in the Irish League from 1929–34
Location of Belfast-based teams in the Irish League from 1929–34

The 1931–32 Irish League was the 38th edition of the Irish League, the highest level of league competition in Northern Irish football. The league comprised 14 teams, and Linfield won the championship.

== League standings ==
Pos	Team	Pld	W	D	L	GF	GA	GR	Pts	Result
1	Linfield (C)	26	19	3	4	77	34	2.265	41	Champions
2	Derry City	26	16	6	4	61	30	2.033	38	
3	Belfast Celtic	26	14	5	7	56	35	1.600	33	
4	Coleraine	26	13	6	7	67	54	1.241	32	
5	Glentoran	26	12	7	7	73	54	1.352	31	
6	Ballymena	26	12	5	9	67	41	1.634	29	
7	Cliftonville	26	11	5	10	59	55	1.073	27	
8	Distillery	26	8	7	11	57	68	0.838	23	
9	Portadown	26	8	6	12	54	63	0.857	22	
10	Newry Town	26	9	4	13	43	53	0.811	22	
11	Larne	26	6	7	13	47	85	0.553	19	
12	Ards	26	7	4	15	52	82	0.634	18	
13	Glenavon	26	6	5	15	42	74	0.568	17	
14	Bangor	26	3	6	17	41	68	0.603	12	

Source: rsssf.com
(C) Champions

== Results ==
Home \ Away	ARD	BAN	BLM	BCE	CLI	COL	DER	DIS	GLV	GLT	LAR	LIN	NEW	POR
Ards		2–2	1–1	2–1	2–2	3–4	1–2	3–1	4–1	3–2	4–1	2–5	2–0	3–4
Bangor	3–0		2–3	1–3	0–1	1–3	1–4	2–4	0–1	3–3	0–0	1–5	1–4	5–3
Ballymena	6–2	6–4		6–0	3–5	7–0	0–0	4–0	4–1	5–0	2–0	2–0	6–2	2–3
Belfast Celtic	3–0	0–0	2–1		4–6	2–2	0–1	3–0	7–1	4–0	5–1	4–2	3–2	0–0
Cliftonville	9–2	3–1	1–1	0–2		4–1	0–1	3–0	4–2	0–5	1–1	0–3	3–0	3–2
Coleraine	4–0	2–5	4–1	1–0	3–1		1–1	6–3	2–1	3–3	4–1	2–2	3–1	8–4
Derry City	6–3	4–1	2–2	1–0	6–1	1–0		3–2	5–1	1–2	6–0	1–1	1–0	2–1
Distillery	1–1	1–1	2–0	0–0	4–3	2–2	4–4		4–2	3–3	5–2	2–3	2–1	3–2
Glenavon	3–2	1–1	0–4	0–2	1–4	1–4	1–4	1–0		2–2	4–2	2–3	2–2	2–0
Glentoran	6–2	3–1	3–0	2–1	1–1	3–2	1–1	5–2	3–1		8–2	0–1	2–3	3–1
Larne	5–4	5–4	3–0	1–1	1–1	1–4	2–1	4–7	2–4	2–2		1–6	4–1	2–2
Linfield	4–1	4–1	2–0	0–1	2–0	4–1	3–0	4–2	3–1	4–3	6–0		4–1	2–0
Newry Town	4–0	1–0	1–1	2–4	3–1	1–1	0–2	4–1	1–1	2–5	1–2	3–1		1–0
Portadown	2–3	2–0	1–0	3–4	4–2	1–0	2–1	2–2	5–5	4–3	2–2	3–3	1–2	

Source: Irish League Archive
Legend: Blue = home team win; Yellow = draw; Red = away team win.
