= 1981–82 Irish League =

Irish League
- Season: 1981–82
- Champions: Linfield; 34th Irish title
- Matches played: 132
- Goals scored: 431 (3.27 per match)
- Top goalscorer: Gary Blackledge (18 goals)

Location of teams in the 1980–83 Irish League
Location of the Belfast-based teams in the Irish League 1980-83

The 1981–82 Irish League was the 81st edition of the Irish League, the highest level of league competition in Northern Irish football. The league consisted of 12 teams, and Linfield won the championship.

== League standings ==
Pos	Team	Pld	W	D	L	GF	GA	GD	Pts	Qualification
1	Linfield (C)	22	17	3	2	59	19	+40	37	Qualification for the European Cup first round
2	Glentoran	22	16	1	5	61	22	+39	33	Qualification for the UEFA Cup first round
3	Coleraine	22	14	3	5	63	31	+32	31	Qualification for the European Cup Winners' Cup first round
4	Crusaders	22	11	4	7	36	31	+5	26	
5	Cliftonville	22	9	6	7	33	28	+5	24	
6	Portadown	22	11	2	9	29	29	0	24	
7	Ballymena United	22	6	8	8	25	30	−5	20	
8	Distillery	22	7	4	11	30	44	−14	18	
9	Glenavon	22	4	7	11	30	52	−22	15	
10	Ards	22	5	4	13	18	47	−29	14	
11	Larne	22	5	3	14	27	42	−15	13	
12	Bangor	22	3	3	16	20	56	−36	9	

Source: rsssf.com
(C) Champions

== Results ==
Home \ Away	ARD	BAN	BLM	CLI	COL	CRU	DIS	GLV	GLT	LRN	LIN	POR
Ards		2–0	0–0	0–1	0–3	0–0	2–0	2–4	1–7	1–0	1–2	0–1
Bangor	0–1		1–3	1–1	1–5	2–1	3–3	1–2	2–1	0–4	0–5	0–1
Ballymena United	2–1	1–2		1–3	4–2	0–0	1–1	0–0	1–0	2–0	1–1	1–3
Cliftonville	4–0	1–0	1–1		2–2	0–1	1–0	2–3	0–1	4–1	0–4	1–0
Coleraine	9–1	3–2	2–0	3–1		0–2	3–1	4–0	1–2	0–0	3–1	4–2
Crusaders	1–0	5–1	2–1	2–1	3–4		1–3	2–1	3–0	2–3	1–2	2–1
Distillery	1–0	4–0	2–3	2–2	1–0	1–2		4–2	0–5	1–0	0–7	3–0
Glenavon	2–2	1–1	1–1	2–2	0–3	2–2	3–1		1–3	3–3	0–6	0–2
Glentoran	2–0	4–0	3–1	1–2	2–2	6–1	6–1	3–1		4–1	1–2	3–1
Larne	2–3	2–1	1–1	0–2	2–5	0–1	1–0	4–0	0–1		2–3	0–3
Linfield	5–0	4–2	3–0	1–0	2–1	2–2	1–1	2–1	1–2	2–1		2–0
Portadown	1–1	2–0	1–0	2–2	2–4	1–0	1–0	2–1	0–4	3–0	0–1	

Source: Irish League Archive
Legend: Blue = home team win; Yellow = draw; Red = away team win.
