= 2000–01 County Antrim Shield =

Tournament details
- Country: Northern Ireland
- Teams: 16

Final positions
- Champions: Linfield (38th win)
- Runners-up: Glentoran

Tournament statistics
- Matches played: 15
- Goals scored: 54 (3.6 per match)

The 2000–01 County Antrim Shield was the 112th edition of the County Antrim Shield, a cup competition in Northern Irish football.

Linfield won the tournament for the 38th time, defeating Glentoran 2–1 in the final.

== Results ==
=== First round ===
Team 1	Score	Team 2
Ballymena United	3–0	Ballymoney United
Bangor	4–0	Enkalon
Cliftonville	3–0	Carrick Rangers
Crusaders	2–0	Killyleagh Youth
Glentoran	3–0	Ards
Larne	4–2	Harland & Wolff Welders
Linfield	8–0	Wakehurst
Lisburn Distillery	2–0	Ballyclare Comrades

=== Quarter-finals ===
Team 1	Score	Team 2
Ballymena United	1–3	Linfield
Crusaders	0–3	Cliftonville
Larne	0–4	Glentoran
Lisburn Distillery	3–0	Bangor

=== Semi-finals ===
Team 1	Score	Team 2
Glentoran]	2–0	Cliftonville
Linfield	3–1	Lisburn Distillery

=== Final ===
30 January 2001

Linfield	2–1	Glentoran
Ferguson 46', 84'		Nixon 52'

Windsor Park, Belfast
Referee: Michael Ross (Carrickfergus)
