= 1907–08 Irish League =

Irish League
- Season: 1907–08
- Dates: 17 September 1907 – 16 May 1908
- Champions: Linfield; 9th Irish title
- Matches played: 56
- Goals scored: 173 (3.09 per match)
- Biggest home win: Belfast Celtic 7–0 Bohemians
- Biggest away win: Belfast Celtic 0–3 Shelbourne; Bohemians 0–3 Cliftonville
- Highest scoring: Belfast Celtic 7–0 Bohemians; Belfast Celtic 5–2 Distillery; Glentoran 4–3 Derry Celtic

The 1907–08 Irish League was the 18th edition of the Irish League, the highest level of league competition in Irish football.

The league comprised eight teams, and Linfield won the championship for the 9th time and 2nd season in a row.

== Teams and locations ==
Location of teams in the 1907–08 Irish League season
Location of Belfast teams in the 1907–08 Irish League season
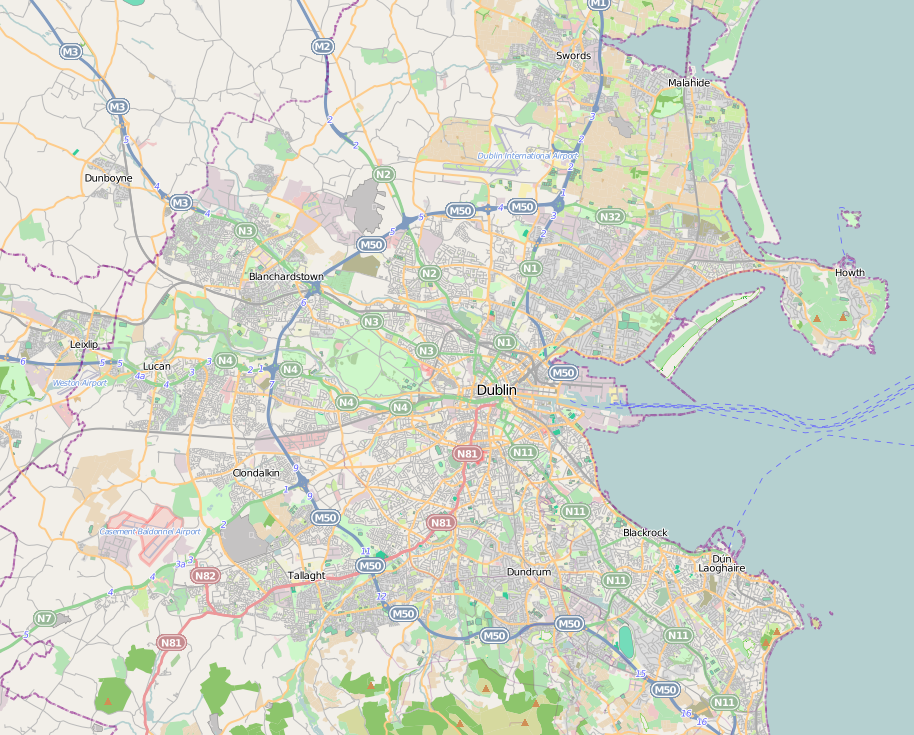
Location of Dublin teams in the 1907–08 Irish League

Team	Town	Home Ground
Belfast Celtic	Belfast	Celtic Park
Bohemians	Dublin	Dalymount Park
Cliftonville	Belfast	Solitude
Derry Celtic	Derry	Brandywell
Distillery	Belfast	Grosvenor Park
Glentoran	Belfast	The Oval
Linfield	Belfast	Windsor Park
Shelbourne	Dublin	Sandymount Road

== League standings ==
Pos	Team	Pld	W	D	L	GF	GA	GR	Pts	Result
1	Linfield (C)	14	10	2	2	31	15	2.067	22	Champions
2	Cliftonville	14	6	5	3	22	16	1.375	17	
3	Glentoran	14	7	3	4	27	23	1.174	17	
4	Distillery	14	6	2	6	21	21	1.000	14	
5	Shelbourne	14	6	2	6	22	17	1.294	14	
6	Belfast Celtic	14	6	1	7	21	20	1.050	13	
7	Derry Celtic	14	4	1	9	16	30	0.533	9	
8	Bohemians	14	2	2	10	13	31	0.419	6	

Source: rsssf.com
(C) Champions

== Results ==
Home \ Away	BCE	BOH	CLI	DCE	DIS	GLT	LIN	SHE
Belfast Celtic		7–0	0–0	1–2	5–2	2–1	1–2	0–3
Bohemians	0–1		0–3	3–0	3–1	1–3	2–4	1–2
Cliftonville	3–1	3–0		2–0	1–1	1–1	1–1	0–2
Derry Celtic	1–0	1–1	2–3		1–2	2–1	2–4	1–0
Distillery	0–1	1–0	1–2	2–1		3–1	0–1	4–1
Glentoran	0–2	3–1	2–0	4–3	1–1		2–2	3–2
Linfield	3–0	1–0	3–1	4–0	3–1	2–3		1–0
Shelbourne	3–0	1–1	2–2	3–0	0–2	1–2	2–0	

Source: Irish League Archive
Legend: Blue = home team win; Yellow = draw; Red = away team win.
