= 1997–98 County Antrim Shield =

Tournament details
- Country: Northern Ireland
- Teams: 16

Final positions
- Champions: Linfield (37th win)
- Runners-up: Crusaders

Tournament statistics
- Matches played: 15
- Goals scored: 53 (3.53 per match)

The 1997–98 County Antrim Shield was the 109th edition of the County Antrim Shield, a cup competition in Northern Irish football.

Linfield won the tournament for the 37th time, defeating Crusaders 1–0 in the final. For the 12th year running clubs from County Armagh competed (Newry Town and Portadown), however Glenavon did not compete in this edition.

== Results ==
=== First round ===
Team 1	Score	Team 2
Ballymena United	2–3	Ballyclare Comrades
Bangor	1–2 (a.e.t.)	Cliftonville
Crusaders	2–1	Newry Town
Distillery	0–0 (a.e.t.) (5–4 p)	Glentoran
Dundela	5–3	Carrick Rangers
Dungannon Swifts	1–5	Larne
Linfield	2–0	Killyleagh Youth
Portadown	4–2	Ards

=== Quarter-finals ===
Team 1	Score	Team 2
Distillery	4–1	Ballyclare Comrades
Dundela	4–2	Larne
Linfield	0–0 (a.e.t.) (6–5 p)	Cliftonville
Portadown	0–1	Crusaders

=== Semi-finals ===
Team 1	Score	Team 2
Crusaders	3–0	Dundela
Linfield	4–0	Distillery

=== Final ===
17 February 1998

Linfield	1–0 (a.e.t.)	Crusaders
Larmour 103'

The Oval, Belfast
Referee: David Malcolm
