= Tom Edwards (footballer, born 1906) =

Welsh footballer

Personal information
- Date of birth: 9 April 1906
- Place of birth: Wales
- Date of death: 1980 (aged 73–74)
- Position: Defender

Senior career*
Years	Team	Apps	(Gls)
- Linfield

International career
1931	Wales	1	(0)
- * Club domestic league appearances and goals

Tom Edwards (9 April 1906 – 1980) was a Welsh international footballer. He was part of the Wales team that competed in the 1931–32 British Home Championship, playing one match on 31 October 1931 against Scotland. At club level, he played for Linfield.

== See also ==
- List of Wales international footballers (alphabetical)
