= 1962–63 County Antrim Shield =

Tournament details
- Country: Northern Ireland
- Teams: 12

Final positions
- Champions: Linfield (27th win)
- Runners-up: Bangor

Tournament statistics
- Matches played: 12
- Goals scored: 71 (5.92 per match)

The 1962–63 County Antrim Shield was the 74th edition of the County Antrim Shield, a cup competition in Northern Irish football.

Linfield won the tournament for the 27th time and 3rd consecutive season, defeating Bangor 4–0 in the final at Solitude.

== Results ==
=== First round ===
Team 1	Score	Team 2
Cliftonville Olympic	1–1	Ards
Ballyclare Comrades	0–1	Ballymena United
Cliftonville	4–4	Dundela
Distillery	3–2	Chimney Corner
Bangor	bye	
Crusaders	bye	
Glentoran	bye	
Linfield	bye	

==== Replays ====
Team 1	Score	Team 2
Ards	9-2	Cliftonville Olympic
Dundela	1–1	Cliftonville

==== Second replay ====
Team 1	Score	Team 2
Cliftonville	0–2	Dundela

=== Quarter-finals ===
Team 1	Score	Team 2
Bangor	1–0	Dundela
Crusaders	2–2	Ards
Distillery	4–1	Ballymena United
Linfield	2–2	Glentoran

==== Replays ====
Team 1	Score	Team 2
Ards	3–5	Crusaders
Glentoran	1–1	Linfield

==== Second replay ====
Team 1	Score	Team 2
Linfield	3–1	Glentoran

=== Semi-finals ===
Team 1	Score	Team 2
Bangor	2–1	Crusaders
Linfield	3–2	Distillery

=== Final ===
11 May 1963

Linfield	4–0	Bangor
Dickson 24'; Stewart 26'; Braithwaite 28'; Craig 64'	Report

Solitude, Belfast
Referee: S. Carswell (Belfast)
