= 1994–95 County Antrim Shield =

Tournament details
- Country: Northern Ireland
- Teams: 16

Final positions
- Champions: Linfield (36th win)
- Runners-up: Glenavon

Tournament statistics
- Matches played: 15
- Goals scored: 60 (4 per match)

The 1994–95 County Antrim Shield was the 106th edition of the County Antrim Shield, a cup competition in Northern Irish football.

Linfield won the tournament for the 36th time, defeating Glenavon 4–0 in the final. For the 9th year running the County Antrim FA invited three clubs from County Armagh to compete (Glenavon, Newry Town and Portadown).

== Results ==
=== First round ===
| Team 1 | Score | Team 2 |
|---|---|---|
| Ards | 2–1 | Crusaders |
| Ballymena United | 1–3 | Linfield |
| Bangor | 0–1 | Cliftonville |
| Carrick Rangers | 4–2 | Ballymena United |
| Distillery | 1–2 | Portadown |
| Glenavon | 3–2 | Larne |
| Glentoran | 3–0 | Brantwood |
| Newry Town | 2–0 | Dunmurry Young Men |

=== Quarter-finals ===
| Team 1 | Score | Team 2 |
|---|---|---|
| Ards | 3–4 | Linfield |
| Cliftonville | 1–0 | Glentoran |
| Glenavon | 3–2 | Carrick Rangers |
| Newry Town | 1–2 | Portadown |

=== Semi-finals ===
| Team 1 | Score | Team 2 |
|---|---|---|
| Glenavon | 5–3 | Portadown |
| Linfield | 3–2 | Cliftonville |

=== Final ===
31 January 1995

| Linfield | 4–0 | Glenavon |
|---|---|---|
| Haylock 51' (pen.), 73', 74'; Scappaticci 59' (o.g.); McGee (red card) 53' | | Collins (red card) 53' |

The Oval, Belfast
Attendance: 6,000
Referee: George Keatley
