= 1933–34 Irish League =

Irish League
- Season: 1933–34
- Champions: Linfield; 17th Irish title
- Matches: 182
- Goals: 718 (3.95 per match)

Location of teams in the Irish League from 1929–34
Location of Belfast-based teams in the Irish League from 1929–34

The 1933–34 Irish League was the 40th edition of the Irish League, the highest level of league competition in Northern Irish football. The league comprised 14 teams, and Linfield won the championship.

== League standings ==
| Pos | Team | Pld | W | D | L | GF | GA | GR | Pts | Result |
|---|---|---|---|---|---|---|---|---|---|---|
| 1 | Linfield (C) | 26 | 22 | 2 | 2 | 88 | 21 | 4.190 | 46 | Champions |
| 2 | Belfast Celtic | 26 | 17 | 3 | 6 | 74 | 42 | 1.762 | 37 | |
| 3 | Glentoran | 26 | 16 | 3 | 7 | 59 | 36 | 1.639 | 35 | |
| 4 | Distillery | 26 | 14 | 3 | 9 | 61 | 41 | 1.488 | 31 | |
| 5 | Ballymena | 26 | 12 | 6 | 8 | 59 | 46 | 1.283 | 30 | |
| 6 | Ards | 26 | 11 | 5 | 10 | 47 | 46 | 1.022 | 27 | |
| 7 | Portadown | 26 | 10 | 5 | 11 | 41 | 52 | 0.788 | 25 | |
| 8 | Glenavon | 26 | 10 | 4 | 12 | 45 | 54 | 0.833 | 24 | |
| 9 | Derry City | 26 | 8 | 7 | 11 | 37 | 38 | 0.974 | 23 | |
| 10 | Cliftonville | 26 | 11 | 0 | 15 | 50 | 78 | 0.641 | 22 | |
| 11 | Bangor | 26 | 7 | 4 | 15 | 43 | 58 | 0.741 | 18 | |
| 12 | Coleraine | 26 | 7 | 3 | 16 | 40 | 61 | 0.656 | 17 | |
| 13 | Newry Town | 26 | 5 | 6 | 15 | 37 | 71 | 0.521 | 16 | |
| 14 | Larne | 26 | 4 | 5 | 17 | 37 | 74 | 0.500 | 13 | |

Source: rsssf.com
(C) Champions

== Results ==
| Home \ Away | ARD | BAN | BLM | BCE | CLI | COL | DER | DIS | GLV | GLT | LAR | LIN | NEW | POR |
|---|---|---|---|---|---|---|---|---|---|---|---|---|---|---|
| Ards | | 2–0 | 2–1 | 2–2 | 3–2 | 2–0 | 2–2 | 3–2 | 4–0 | 0–2 | 1–0 | 1–4 | 5–1 | 2–0 |
| Bangor | 3–2 | | 2–3 | 2–2 | 3–4 | 1–2 | 1–1 | 3–5 | 2–1 | 3–2 | 2–2 | 1–4 | 3–0 | 3–2 |
| Ballymena | 2–2 | 5–0 | | 2–1 | 1–4 | 4–2 | 2–1 | 4–2 | 3–3 | 3–1 | 4–2 | 2–4 | 7–0 | 1–0 |
| Belfast Celtic | 3–3 | 0–1 | 3–2 | | 5–1 | 5–2 | 3–2 | 3–0 | 2–0 | 4–0 | 6–1 | 2–5 | 3–2 | 3–1 |
| Cliftonville | 0–2 | 2–1 | 0–3 | 2–4 | | 2–1 | 4–1 | 0–4 | 3–2 | 0–2 | 2–1 | 0–6 | 2–3 | 4–2 |
| Coleraine | 2–1 | 3–2 | 0–0 | 2–3 | 4–2 | | 2–1 | 2–4 | 1–2 | 1–3 | 4–2 | 2–2 | 4–1 | 0–1 |
| Derry City | 2–0 | 2–0 | 2–2 | 0–1 | 5–1 | 1–0 | | 0–1 | 3–3 | 2–1 | 1–0 | 2–0 | 1–2 | 2–3 |
| Distillery | 2–1 | 1–0 | 1–0 | 1–2 | 5–1 | 3–3 | 3–0 | | 2–2 | 0–1 | 3–1 | 1–2 | 6–1 | 0–1 |
| Glenavon | 2–1 | 1–0 | 7–2 | 3–2 | 1–2 | 5–1 | 0–1 | 1–6 | | 2–1 | 0–0 | 0–2 | 3–1 | 2–1 |
| Glentoran | 6–2 | 5–2 | 1–1 | 4–2 | 2–5 | 3–1 | 1–0 | 3–0 | 1–0 | | 4–0 | 0–3 | 3–0 | 3–3 |
| Larne | 1–3 | 3–2 | 0–3 | 1–5 | 2–4 | 4–1 | 0–0 | 2–4 | 1–2 | 1–4 | | 3–3 | 5–3 | 2–2 |
| Linfield | 5–0 | 2–1 | 3–0 | 3–1 | 3–0 | 2–0 | 2–1 | 3–0 | 8–1 | 0–1 | 8–1 | | 1–0 | 5–0 |
| Newry Town | 1–1 | 0–3 | 2–2 | 0–6 | 6–2 | 3–0 | 1–1 | 2–2 | 2–1 | 1–1 | 1–2 | 0–2 | | 1–1 |
| Portadown | 1–0 | 2–2 | 1–0 | 0–1 | 6–1 | 2–0 | 3–3 | 0–3 | 2–1 | 0–4 | 2–0 | 1–6 | 4–3 | |

Source: Irish League Archive
Legend: Blue = home team win; Yellow = draw; Red = away team win.
