= 1960–61 County Antrim Shield =

Tournament details
- Country: Northern Ireland
- Teams: 12

Final positions
- Champions: Linfield (25th win)
- Runners-up: Glentoran

Tournament statistics
- Matches played: 12
- Goals scored: 58 (4.83 per match)

The 1960–61 County Antrim Shield was the 72nd edition of the County Antrim Shield, a cup competition in Northern Irish football.

Linfield won the tournament for the 25th time, defeating Glentoran 2–1 in the final at Solitude.

== Results ==
=== First round ===
Team 1	Score	Team 2
Ards	3–2	Brantwood
Ballyclare Comrades	4–4	Bangor
Ballymena United	8–2	Linfield Swifts
Linfield	4–1	Dundela
Cliftonville	bye	
Crusaders	bye	
Distillery	bye	
Glentoran	bye	

==== Replay ====
Team 1	Score	Team 2
Bangor	1–2	Ballyclare Comrades

=== Quarter-finals ===
Team 1	Score	Team 2
Ards	2–5	Distillery
Ballyclare Comrades	2–3	Glentoran
Ballymena United	1–0	Crusaders
Cliftonville	1–5	Linfield

=== Semi-finals ===
Team 1	Score	Team 2
Glentoran	1–0	Ballymena United
Linfield	4–0	Distillery

=== Final ===
13 May 1961

Linfield	2–1	Glentoran
Ferguson 32'; Dickson 62'	Report	Thompson 55'

Solitude, Belfast
