= 1980–81 County Antrim Shield =

Tournament details
- Country: Northern Ireland
- Teams: 13

Final positions
- Champions: Linfield (32nd win)
- Runners-up: Glentoran

Tournament statistics
- Matches played: 12
- Goals scored: 47 (3.92 per match)

The 1980–81 County Antrim Shield was the 92nd edition of the County Antrim Shield, a cup competition in Northern Irish football.

Linfield won the tournament for the 32nd time, defeating Glentoran 4–1 in the final.

== Results ==
=== First round ===
Team 1	Score	Team 2
Ards	4–1	Distillery
Cliftonville	4–1	RUC
Crusaders	3–0	Comber Recreation
Larne	1–0	Dundela
Linfield	1–0	Killyleagh Youth
Ballymena United	bye	
Bangor	bye	
Glentoran	bye	

=== Quarter-finals ===
Team 1	Score	Team 2
Ballymena United	0–6	Linfield
Bangor	4–3	Larne
Cliftonville	0–1	Ards
Glentoran	4–1	Crusaders

=== Semi-finals ===
Team 1	Score	Team 2
Ards	1–4	Linfield
Glentoran	3–0	Bangor

=== Final ===
4 May 1981

Linfield	4–1	Glentoran
McGaughey 12', 80'; McKee 75'; Gordon 84'	Report	Blackledge 11'

Windsor Park, Belfast
Referee: D. Campbell (Newtownabbey)
