= 1908–09 Irish League =

Irish League
- Season: 1908–09
- Dates: 15 September 1908 – 15 May 1909
- Champions: Linfield; 10th Irish title
- Matches played: 54
- Goals scored: 175 (3.24 per match)
- Biggest home win: Glentoran 6–0 Belfast Celtic
- Biggest away win: Bohemians 0–4 Linfield
- Highest scoring: Bohemians 5–2 Belfast Celtic; Bohemians 6–1 Glentoran

The 1908–09 Irish League was the 19th edition of the Irish League, the highest level of league competition in Irish football.

The league comprised eight teams, and Linfield won the championship for 10th time and the 3rd season in a row.

== Teams and locations ==
Location of teams in the 1908–09 Irish League season
Location of Belfast teams in the 1908–09 Irish League season
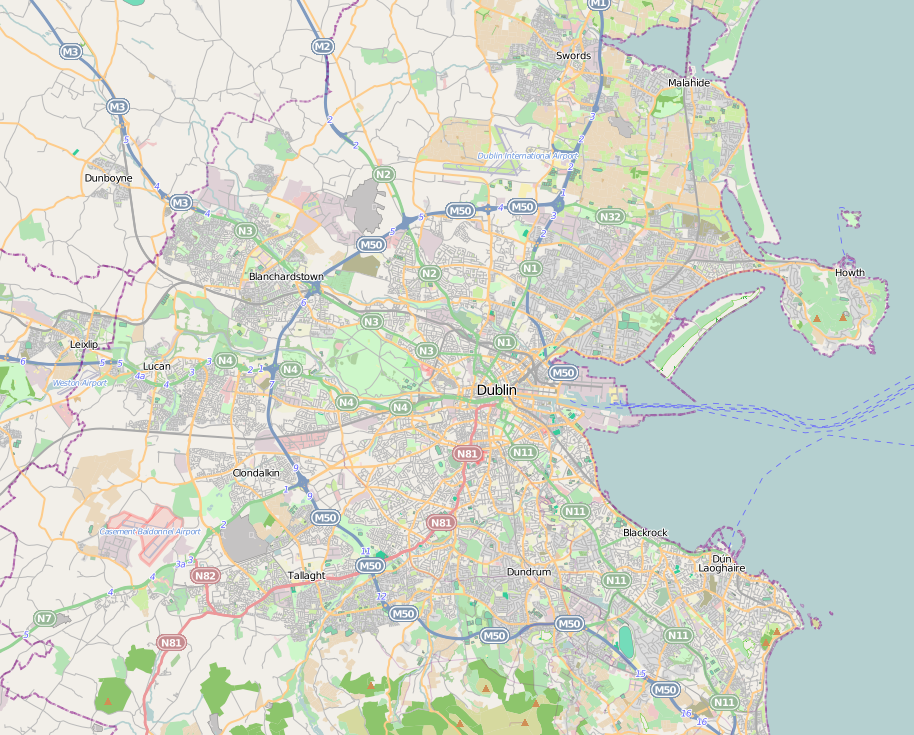
Location of Dublin teams in the 1908–09 Irish League

Team	Town	Home Ground
Belfast Celtic	Belfast	Celtic Park
Bohemians	Dublin	Dalymount Park
Cliftonville	Belfast	Solitude
Derry Celtic	Derry	Brandywell
Distillery	Belfast	Grosvenor Park
Glentoran	Belfast	The Oval
Linfield	Belfast	Windsor Park
Shelbourne	Dublin	Sandymount Road

== League standings ==
Pos	Team	Pld	W	D	L	GF	GA	GR	Pts	Result
1	Linfield (C)	14	10	1	3	27	13	2.077	21	Champions
2	Glentoran	14	8	3	3	29	22	1.318	19	
3	Shelbourne	14	7	0	7	20	20	1.000	14	
4	Distillery	14	6	1	7	22	19	1.158	13	
5	Bohemians	12	6	1	5	27	24	1.125	13	
6	Belfast Celtic	13	4	2	7	21	32	0.656	10	
7	Cliftonville	13	4	2	7	17	19	0.895	10	
8	Derry Celtic	14	4	0	10	12	26	0.462	8	

Source: rsssf.com
(C) Champions

== Results ==
Home \ Away	BCE	BOH	CLI	DCE	DIS	GLT	LIN	SHE
Belfast Celtic		– (Note: The matches Belfast Celtic–Bohemians and Cliftonville–Bohemians were not played.)	2–1	2–1	2–3	1–1	2–3	3–2
Bohemians	5–2		2–2	2–1	1–0	6–1	0–4	3–1
Cliftonville	0–2	–		5–0	0–1	1–1	2–1	1–3
Derry Celtic	2–1	2–1	1–0		3–2	0–1	0–2	0–1
Distillery	2–2	3–0	1–3	3–1		0–1	0–1	1–2
Glentoran	6–0	4–2	4–1	3–1	2–1		2–2	2–1
Linfield	3–2	2–1	0–1	2–0	0–2	4–1		1–0
Shelbourne	3–0	2–4	1–0	1–0	1–3	2–0	0–2	

Source: Irish League Archive
Legend: Blue = home team win; Yellow = draw; Red = away team win.
