= 1996–97 Gold Cup =

Tournament details
- Country: Northern Ireland
- Teams: 16

Final positions
- Champions: Linfield (33rd win)
- Runners-up: Glenavon

Tournament statistics
- Matches played: 31
- Goals scored: 89 (2.87 per match)

The 1996–97 Gold Cup was the 78th edition of the Gold Cup, a cup competition in Northern Irish football.

The tournament was won by Linfield for the 33rd time, defeating Glenavon 1–0 in the final at The Oval.

== Group standings ==
=== Section A ===
Pos	Team	Pld	W	D	L	GF	GA	GD	Pts	Result
1	Portadown	3	2	1	0	4	1	+3	7	Advance to quarter-final
2	Bangor	3	2	0	1	5	1	+4	6	Advance to quarter-final
3	Coleraine	3	1	1	1	4	1	+3	4	
4	Newry Town	3	0	0	3	1	11	−10	0	

Source: Irish League Archive

=== Section B ===
Pos	Team	Pld	W	D	L	GF	GA	GD	Pts	Result
1	Crusaders	3	3	0	0	8	2	+6	9	Advance to quarter-final
2	Ballymena United	3	2	0	1	6	3	+3	6	Advance to quarter-final
3	Larne	3	0	1	2	3	7	−4	1	
4	Ards	3	0	1	2	3	8	−5	1	

Source: Irish League Archive

=== Section C ===
Pos	Team	Pld	W	D	L	GF	GA	GD	Pts	Result
1	Omagh Town	3	2	0	1	3	2	+1	6	Advance to quarter-final
2	Glentoran	3	1	1	1	6	3	+3	4	Advance to quarter-final
3	Cliftonville	3	1	1	1	5	5	0	4	
4	Carrick Rangers	3	1	0	2	4	8	−4	3	

Source: Irish League Archive

=== Section D ===
Pos	Team	Pld	W	D	L	GF	GA	GD	Pts	Result
1	Linfield	3	2	1	0	4	1	+3	7	Advance to quarter-final
2	Glenavon	3	2	0	1	11	1	+10	6	Advance to quarter-final
3	Distillery	3	0	2	1	2	9	−7	2	
4	Ballyclare Comrades	3	0	1	2	3	9	−6	1	

Source: Irish League Archive

== Quarter-finals ==
Team 1	Score	Team 2
Ballymena United	0–0 (a.e.t.) (3–1 p)	Portadown
Bangor	0–2	Linfield
Glentoran	2–3	Crusaders
Omagh Town	2–3	Glenavon

== Semi-finals ==
Team 1	Score	Team 2
Glenavon	2–0	Crusaders
Linfield	2–0	Ballymena United

== Final ==
12 November 1996

Linfield	1–0	Glenavon
Barker 74'

The Oval, Belfast
Referee: Leslie Irvine (Limavady)
