= Freebooters F.C. =

- Full name: Freebooters Football Club
- Nicknames: the Whites, the Pirates
- Founded: 1898
- Dissolved: 1906
- Ground: Sandymount Road; Dublin
Home colours

Freebooters F.C was an association football club from Sandymount, Dublin, Ireland.

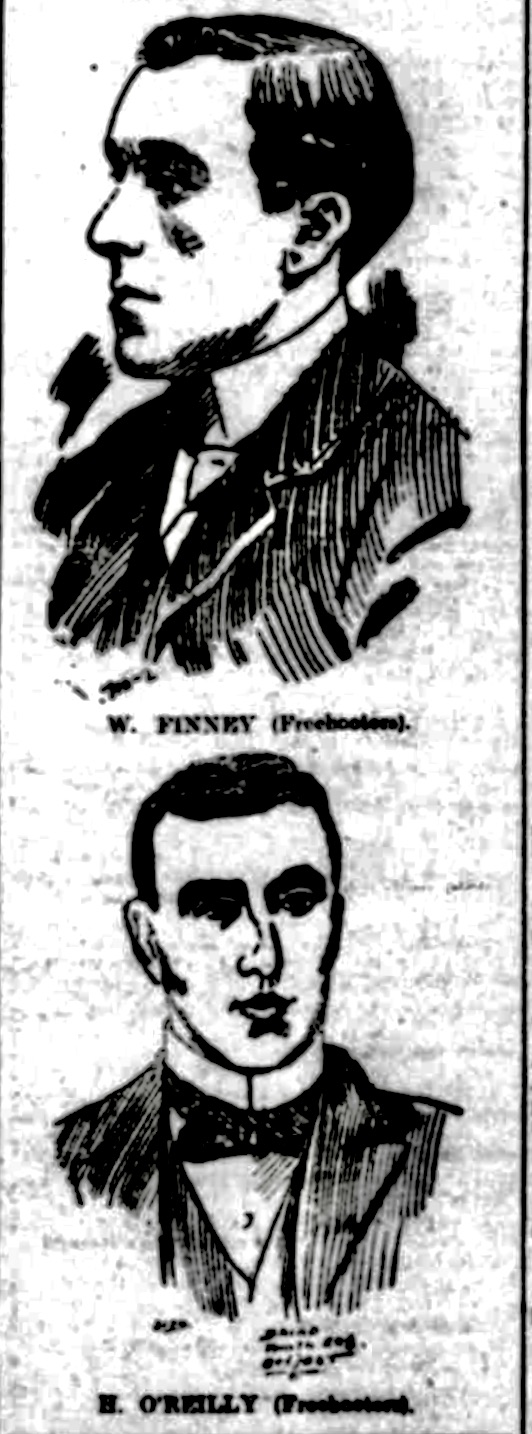
Finney and O'Reilley, Freebooters F.C., Ireland's Saturday Night, 13 April 1901

== History ==
The club was founded in 1898 and was made up of a number of players who had been to public school in England, such families as the O'Reilly's, McCanns, and Meldons; several had gone to Beaumont College in Berkshire, including an Irish international player, Henry O'Reilly. The club was an amateur club, using the Corinthian F.C. as a model.

The club lost 1–0 in the 1900 Leinster Senior Cup final to local rivals Shelbourne in a tight game. Its highest achievement was reaching the 1901 Irish Cup final at Grosvenor Park in Belfast, but lost 1–0 to Cliftonville, the Whites handicapped by playing much of the match with 10 men after an early injury to full-back Ryan. Freebooters had beaten Linfield F.C. 2–1 in the semi-final at the Jones Road venue.

By 1906 however the club was struggling; it had to cede one Leinster Senior League match to Tritonville when only seven players turned up. At the end of the season the club resigned from the competition and seems to have dissolved.

== Colours ==
The club played in white.

== Ground ==
The club played at Sandymount, between the Star of the Sea Church and Ringsend. It was previously leased by the Catholic University Medical School and the club hosted a women's international between Irish and Scottish XIs in 1903. In 1906 Shelbourne F.C. began playing their home games on this ground as Freebooters went into decline.

== Honours ==
- Irish Cup runners-up: 1

1901

- Leinster Senior Cup runners-up: 1

1900

== International players ==
Freebooters players represented Ireland at international level in the British Home Championship.

- Harry O'Reilly
- James V. Nolan-Whelan BL
- J. Mansfield

== Other clubs named Freebooters ==
Other soccer clubs have adopted the name Freebooters, in Cork and in Kilkenny. Freebooters (Cork) came runners-up in the FAI Intermediate Cup in 1949 played in the Cork Business and Shipping League, Freebooters(Kilkenny) was formed in 1950 by workers from the Post Office, one of the players had moved from Freebooters in Cork and so they chose the name.
