= Trevor Anderson =

Northern Irish footballer and manager

Personal information
- Date of birth: 3 March 1951 (age 75)
- Place of birth: Belfast, Northern Ireland
- Position: Forward

Senior career*
Years	Team	Apps	(Gls)
1970–1972	Portadown	90	(40)
1972–1974	Manchester United	19	(2)
1974–1977	Swindon Town	131	(35)
1977–1979	Peterborough United	49	(6)
1979–1987	Linfield	327	(96)
Total		616	(179)

International career
1973–1978	Northern Ireland	22	(4)

Managerial career
- 1992–1997: Linfield
- 1999–2001: Ards
- 2002–2004: Dundalk
- * Club domestic league appearances and goals

Trevor Anderson (born 3 March 1951) is a Northern Irish former footballer and manager. He played as a forward.

== Playing career ==
Born in Belfast, Anderson began his playing career at Portadown before signing for Manchester United in October 1972. After only appearing in 19 League games for the club he moved to Swindon Town and made his début on 5 November 1974. He scored the only goal in this game, a 1–0 win against Chesterfield. He was the club's top scorer for the 1975–76 season with 15 goals.

He moved to Peterborough in December 1977 before returning to Northern Ireland to play for Linfield.

A Northern Ireland international, he made his début against Cyprus in 1973 and went on to achieve 22 caps, 12 whilst a Swindon player.

== Management career ==
Anderson managed Linfield from 1992 to 1997, winning a number of honours including two Irish Football League titles and two Irish Cups. Anderson left the club in 1997 to take up the post as Director of Football at Newry Town. The club were a division below Linfield but had a reputation for spending big money, by Irish League standards, and the club won promotion under Anderson's direction. He subsequently managed Ards, leading the club to promotion in 2001. He went on to manage Dundalk.

== Honours ==
=== Club ===
Linfield

- Irish League (6): 1979–80, 1981–82, 1982–83, 1983–84, 1984–85, 1985–86
- Irish Cup (2): 1980–81, 1981–82
- Gold Cup (4): 1979–80, 1981–82, 1983–84, 1984–85
- Ulster Cup (2): 1979–80, 1984–85
- County Antrim Shield (4): 1980–81, 1981–82, 1982–83, 1983–84
- Tyler All-Ireland Cup (1): 1980–81

=== Individual ===
- Northern Ireland Football Writers' Player of the Year: 1986
