= Linfield F.C. =

Association football club in Northern Ireland

Coordinates: 54°34′57.45″N 5°57′18.68″W

Linfield
- Full name: Linfield Football Club
- Nickname: The Blues
- Founded: March 1886; 140 years ago (as Linfield Athletic Club)
- Ground: Windsor Park
- Capacity: 18,434
- Chairman: Roy McGivern
- Manager: David Healy
- League: NIFL Premiership
- 2025–26: NIFL Premiership, 4th of 12
- Website: www.linfieldfc.com
Home colours	Away colours

Linfield Football Club is a Northern Irish professional football club, based in south Belfast, which plays in the NIFL Premiership – the highest level of the Northern Ireland Football League. The fourth-oldest club on the island of Ireland, Linfield was founded in 1886 by workers at the Ulster Spinning Company's Linfield Mill. Since 1905, the club's home ground has been Windsor Park, which is also the home of the Northern Ireland national team and is the largest football stadium in Northern Ireland. They train at Midgley Park which is beside the stadium. The club's badge displays Windsor Castle, in reference to the ground's namesake.

Historically, Linfield shared a fierce rivalry with Belfast Celtic until Celtic's withdrawal from the league for political reasons in 1949. Since that time the club's main rival has been Glentoran F.C., with the duo known locally as the Big Two. This rivalry traditionally includes a league derby played on Boxing Day each year, which usually attracts Northern Ireland's highest domestic attendance of the season, excluding cup finals. For the 2021–22 season, Linfield's average league home attendance was approximately 2,900, the highest in the division and more than double the league's overall average of around 1,400. The team, nicknamed The Blues, is managed by former Northern Ireland international and the country's all-time record goalscorer, David Healy. Healy was appointed on 14 October 2015 to succeed Warren Feeney, following Feeney's resignation.

Domestically, Linfield has been one of the most successful clubs in the world, holding several national and global records. The club has won 57 league titles, which is more than twice as many as any other Northern Irish club, and makes Linfield the world's most successful club in terms of national championships won. The club has lifted the Northern Irish Cup 44 times, the second-highest number of national cup wins worldwide. It has also won the League Cup a record twelve times, as well as four all-Ireland cup competitions, among other domestic cups, taking its trophy count to well over 116, one of the most in the world. In the 1921–22 season, Linfield completed an unprecedented clean sweep of all seven available trophies (Septuple) – to date, this is the only recorded instance of a seven-trophy season being achieved in world football. (Note: Linfield also won seven trophies during the 1961–62 season, however, one of those trophies (the North-South Cup) was actually the previous season's competition. Due to fixture congestion the 1960–61 final was postponed until February 1962.) In the modern era, the club won all four available domestic trophies in 2006 to complete a domestic quadruple, and has also won three domestic trebles. The club also holds the world record for the most domestic doubles, with 25. Linfield is one of only three clubs to have completed an Irish League campaign unbeaten, having done so on four occasions.

The club was one of the eight founding members of the Irish League in 1890, won the inaugural league title, and is one of only three clubs to have gone on to compete in every season of the Irish League's top division since; a joint world record for the longest continuous membership of a national league's top division. In European football, the club's best finish is the quarter-finals of the 1966–67 European Cup. Linfield FC has qualified for European competitions over 60 times, making them a frequent representative of Northern Ireland in UEFA tournaments.

== Club history ==
=== Formation and early years (1886–1918) ===
The club was founded in March 1886 in an area of south Belfast known as Sandy Row by workers at the Ulster Spinning Company's Linfield Mill. Originally known as Linfield Athletic Club, the team initially played on an area of land located at the back of the mill owned by the company, which was known as the Meadow. Originally, the club had intended to have a rule in place to limit membership to employees of the mill only. However, this idea was quickly scrapped to allow for the strongest team possible, with six of the club's first eleven players being non-employees. Linfield was credited with originating the passing game in Ireland, where a dribbling based approach had been the norm until around 1890, and for three seasons during the club's early years they competed in the English FA Cup. In the 1888–89 qualifying rounds they defeated Ulster and Bolton Wanderers to reach the fourth qualifying round, where they faced Cliftonville. After two draws, they won 7–0 in the second replay, which was played on 25 December 1888. This is notable for being the only FA Cup match ever to be played on Christmas Day.

This victory meant they qualified for the first round proper for the first and only time, where they were drawn to face Nottingham Forest in what would turn out to be a controversial tie. Linfield had earned an impressive 2–2 draw in Nottingham, which meant a replay back in Belfast. In an apparent cup upset, Linfield then defeated Forest 3–1 at the Ulster Cricket Ground in Ballynafeigh, with the large crowd celebrating the fact that Linfield had progressed to the second round. However, a few days later the Belfast Telegraph revealed that the 'replay' had actually been played as nothing more than a friendly. Prior to the match, Linfield had conceded the tie after discovering that they had inadvertently fielded an ineligible player, William Johnston, in the first match. Officials from both clubs had agreed not to reveal this information to the players or the public before the match, in order to play the match as planned. In any case, Linfield would have been unlikely to have played any further part in the cup, as the costs of travelling to Kent to play the second round tie against Chatham at an open ground with no gate income would have been prohibitive. Linfield made their final FA Cup appearance during the 1890–91 first qualifying round, being defeated 5–4 by Nantwich. This was the last season in which Irish clubs entered the competition.

Success on the field meant that the club had to accommodate bigger crowds, bringing about a move to Ulsterville Avenue in 1889. In 1890, Bob Milne signed for the club from the Gordon Highlanders. The Scot would soon become a key member of the team, helping the Blues to lift the Irish Cup at the young age of 20. The club stayed at Ulsterville for five years before housing development on the ground in 1894 meant that the club had to move on once again. Between 1894 and 1897, Linfield played all of their home games at opponents' grounds until the president of the club, Robert Gibson, along with other club members, eventually secured a ground lease at Myrtlefield in the Balmoral area of the city. However, this was another temporary home. The club stayed here until 1905, when they moved into Windsor Park. The club's first silverware at Windsor arrived in the 1906–07 season, with the club lifting both the league title and the County Antrim Shield. This would be the first of a trio of league titles, with the 1907–08 and 1908–09 league titles to follow.

In 1910, team captain Bob Milne left the club with a legacy as one of Linfield's best ever players. He had amassed nine Irish Cups, eight league titles, and had earned 27 international caps for the Ireland national team during his time at the club. Another Scottish player, Marshall McEwan, joined the club in 1911 at the age of 26. He had previously played for English clubs Blackpool, Bolton Wanderers and Chelsea. McEwan is perhaps best remembered for his performance in the 1913 Irish Cup final, described by some fans as the best in years. McEwan retired in 1916, but remained in Belfast and later opened several businesses in the city. In 1915, the Irish League was suspended as a result of the First World War. In its place, a temporary unofficial league known as the Belfast & District League was set up and ran for four seasons until the return of the Irish League in 1919. As this was an unofficial competition, any titles during this time are not counted as Irish League Championships. Linfield won this competition twice, in 1915–16 along with the Irish Cup, and in 1917–18.

=== Two seven-trophy seasons (1921–22 & 1961–62) ===
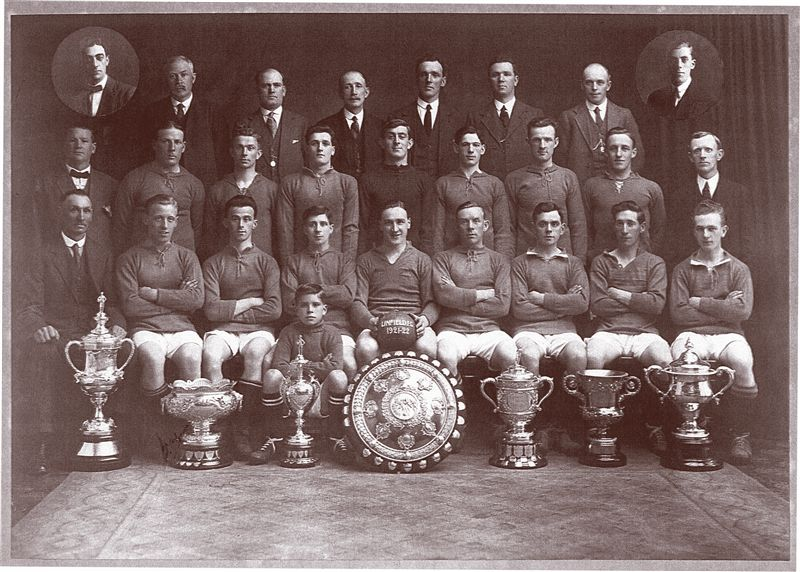
The team that lifted an unprecedented seven trophies in the 1921–22 season.

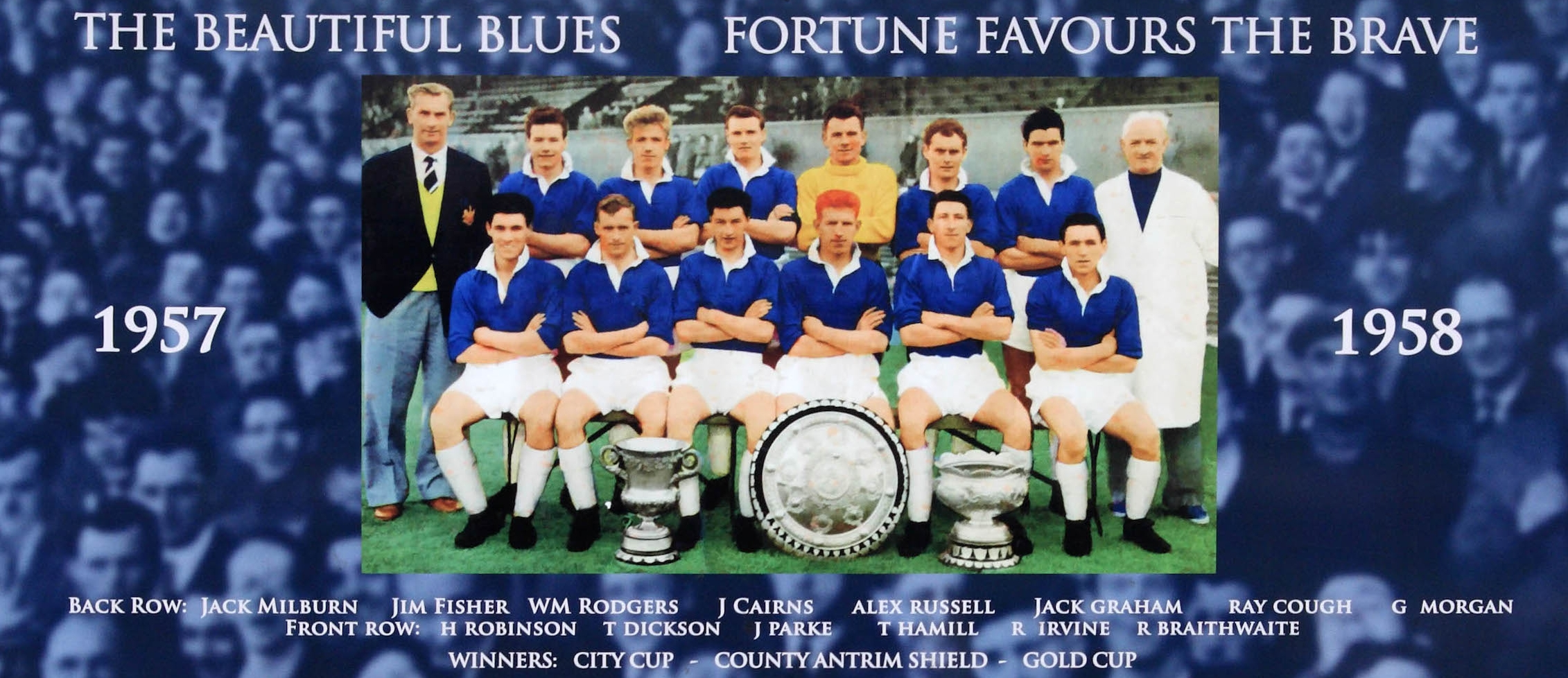
The Linfield squad for the 1957–58 season which included the newly signed Newcastle United legend Jackie Milburn.

In the 1921–22 season, the club achieved a clean sweep of all the domestic competitions they entered – the Irish League, Irish Cup, County Antrim Shield, Alhambra Cup, Belfast Charity Cup, Gold Cup and the City Cup. The club followed this up the next season by winning a treble including the Irish League, Irish Cup and County Antrim Shield in 1922–23. In 1927, Joe Bambrick signed for the Blues, and would become one of the club's all-time top goal scorers. In the 1929–30 season, Bambrick scored a remarkable 94 goals – a record that surprisingly stood for only one season, until Glentoran's Fred Roberts scored an incredible 96 goals during the following campaign. In 1930, Bambrick scored six goals in one game for Ireland – a 7–0 win over Wales. The 1931–32, 1933–34 and 1934–35 league titles followed for Linfield, before Bambrick left the club to join Chelsea in 1935 having scored 286 league goals in just 183 games for Linfield – a remarkable ratio of 1.56 goals per game. The Irish League was once again suspended in 1940 as a result of the Second World War, with another temporary unofficial league set up which was called the Northern Regional League. Linfield won this league three times – in 1942–43, 1944–45 and 1945–46. This league ran for seven seasons until the return of the Irish League once again in 1947.

In 1957, Jackie Milburn famously signed for the Blues as player-manager from Newcastle United, and won the Ulster Footballer of the Year award for his performances during his first season at the club. Milburn's presence dramatically increased average crowds at matches, with the Belfast Telegraph calling it the "signing of the century". Milburn is famous for scoring Linfield's first ever goals in European competition. In September 1959, he scored both goals against IFK Göteborg in a 2–1 Linfield win at Windsor Park in the first leg of the 1959–60 European Cup preliminary round tie – the club's European debut. Milburn was also the Irish league's top goal scorer on two occasions before leaving the club in 1960 to join Yiewsley. In 1962, forty years after Linfield's remarkable seven-trophy season, the club repeated the feat in the 1961–62 season under manager Isaac McDowell. They won another seven-trophy haul including the Irish League, Irish Cup, County Antrim Shield, Gold Cup, City Cup and the Ulster Cup. They also won the North-South Cup final that season, but it was actually the conclusion of the 1960–61 competition. Fixture congestion had meant that the final could not be played before the end of the previous season, so it was rescheduled to take place during the 1961–62 season. A commemorative event was held in April 2012, celebrating the 90th and 50th anniversaries of the 1921–22 and 1961–62 seven-trophy-winning teams.

=== Roy Coyle's 31-trophy haul (1975–1990) ===
Following a spell in England playing for Sheffield Wednesday and Grimsby Town, Roy Coyle joined the club as player-manager, taking over the reins from outgoing manager Billy Campbell. After a tough start to his managerial career at the club, Coyle went on to become the most successful Linfield manager in history, winning numerous trophies during his time at Windsor Park. His first season in charge was without silverware. In fact, having been Irish Cup runners-up the previous season when Coleraine defeated the Blues 1–0 after two replays, Linfield suffered one of the biggest upsets in Northern Irish football history when B Division club Carrick Rangers defeated the Blues 2–1 in the 1975–76 Irish Cup final on 10 April 1976. This giant-killing act in which a junior club defeated a senior club in the Irish Cup final had only happened twice before in the cup's history, and not since 1955. The club stuck by Coyle however, and it was not long before he brought silverware to the club. His first honour arrived in the 1976–77 season in the form of the County Antrim Shield. However, the Blues suffered defeat in the Irish Cup final for the third consecutive season when they lost 4–1 against Coleraine. The 1977–78 season saw the club win an Irish League, Irish Cup and Ulster Cup treble. Runners-up in the last three Irish Cup finals, this time they were not to be denied. A 3–1 victory over Ballymena United secured the club's third trophy of the season.

Coyle retired from playing duties in 1980, but continued as manager. In 1982, future manager David Jeffrey joined the club following a stint in the Manchester United youth team and played for Coyle under many of his trophy successes, captaining the side for much of that time. One of Coyle's biggest achievements as manager was leading the club to six consecutive league titles between 1981–82 and 1986–87, equalling the record for the most consecutive titles which was set by Belfast Celtic in 1947–48. 1986 was the year that Noel Bailie began what would turn out to be a 25-year career at the club. Although a defender for most of that time, Bailie began as a left midfielder.

Coyle's final trophy as Linfield manager was the Gold Cup in 1989–90. During his 15 years at the club he had amassed 10 League titles, 3 Irish Cups, 7 Gold Cups, 4 Ulster Cups, 5 County Antrim Shields, the Irish League Cup, and the Tyler Cup – 31 major honours in total. Coyle left the club in April 1990. Eric Bowyer was appointed as Coyle's replacement, but it was a relatively unsuccessful reign that only lasted for two years until he was sacked in 1992, with David Jeffrey also leaving the club that year to join Ards. Next into the managerial hot seat was Trevor Anderson, who brought more silverware to the club during his five years in charge between 1992 and 1997, including 2 Irish League titles and 2 Irish Cups. After retiring as a player in 1996 following a one-year spell at Larne, David Jeffrey returned to the club as Anderson's assistant manager. This partnership lasted until Anderson resigned on the morning of 4 January 1997. Anderson later became Director of Football at Newry Town.

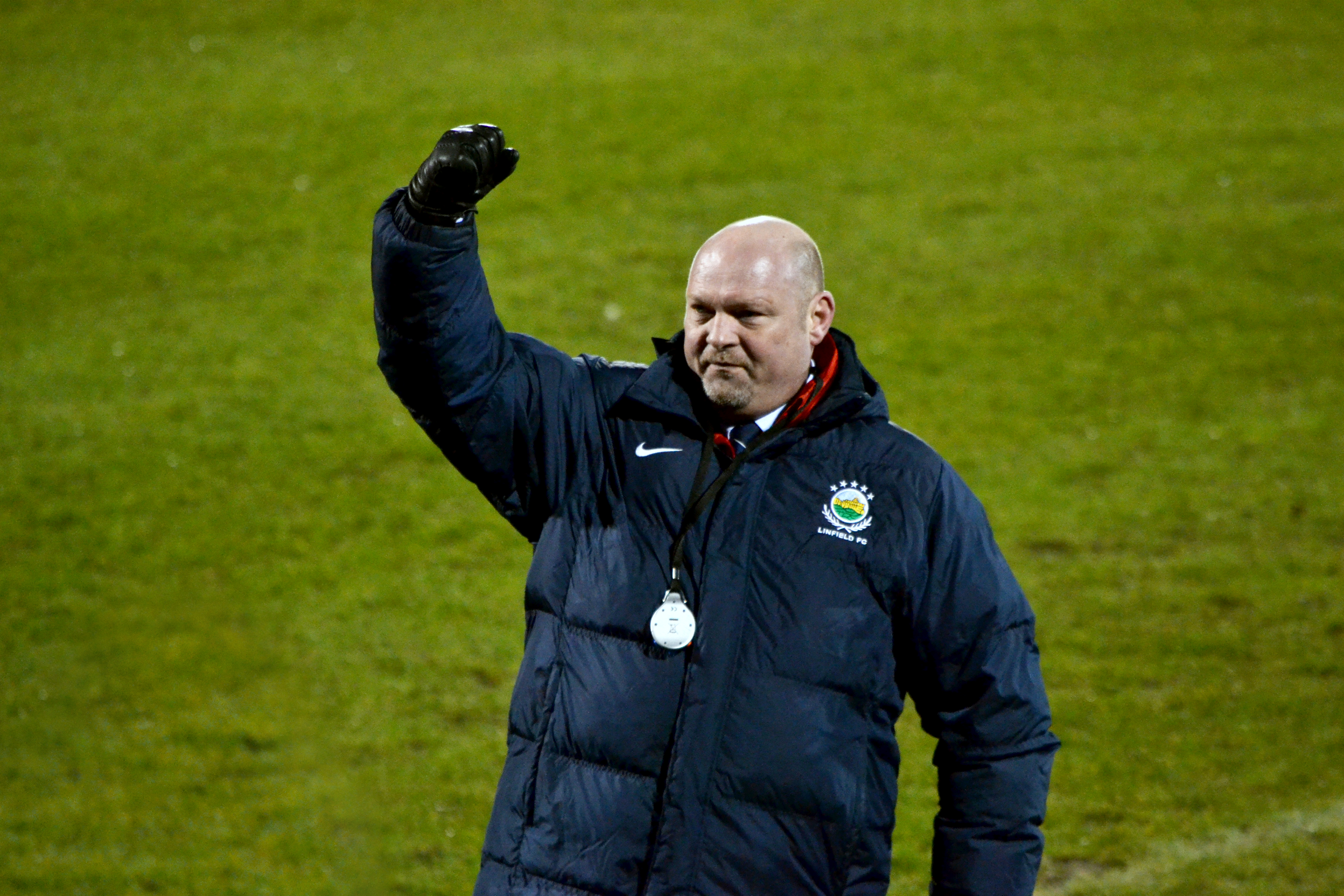
David Jeffrey was Linfield manager for 17 years, 112 days between January 1997 and April 2014, winning a record-equalling 31 trophies during that time.

=== The David Jeffrey years (1997–2014) ===
Jeffrey took charge of the team in a caretaker capacity for a league match against Portadown that afternoon, and remained as caretaker manager for the following match against Ballyclare Comrades in the Floodlit Cup on 7 January. He was officially appointed as manager on a permanent basis on 8 January 1997. In his first full season in charge he led the club to three trophies – the League Cup, County Antrim Shield, and Floodlit Cup – and narrowly missed out on the league title to champions Cliftonville by four points. Jeffrey won his first league title as manager in the 1999–2000 season however, along with a third consecutive League Cup triumph. The Blues retained the league title the following season, and also won the Charity Shield and the County Antrim Shield. The 2001–02 season saw the club win a cup double, lifting both the Irish Cup and the League Cup. In 2005, the inauguration of the Setanta Cup meant the return of an all-Ireland cup competition for the first time since 1980. The Blues qualified as league champions, but started the competition poorly – losing 2–1 away to Longford Town. They recovered from that opening defeat to eventually reach the final against Shelbourne, with the Blues being major underdogs going into the match against full-time professional League of Ireland opposition. However, they overcame the odds with a 2–0 victory to become inaugural winners of the competition. Incidentally, Linfield were in fact the reigning all-Ireland champions at the time, having won the final staging of the Tyler Cup in 1980 before the competition was discontinued.

The 2005–06 season was the most successful of Jeffrey's tenure, with the Blues achieving a clean sweep of all four domestic competitions; the Irish Premier League, Irish Cup, Irish League Cup, and County Antrim Shield. However, they failed to retain the Setanta Cup as defending champions when they were narrowly beaten 1–0 at Windsor Park in the semi-finals by eventual winners, Drogheda United. In April 2010, former captain Noel Bailie made his 1,000th appearance for the club when he played in a 0–0 draw against Crusaders in the league. A few days later, Linfield won their 49th league title after a 1–0 home win against Cliftonville. The following year, a landmark 50th league title arrived during the club's 125th anniversary year. Bailie retired from football in April 2011 at the age of 40, after making 1,013 appearances for the club in all competitions since making his debut against Ballymena United in March 1989. Linfield subsequently retired the number 11 shirt in his honour. In the 2011–12 season, Linfield won a league and cup double for the third consecutive season and the sixth time in seven seasons – a record 51st league title, 42nd Irish Cup win, and 23rd double overall.

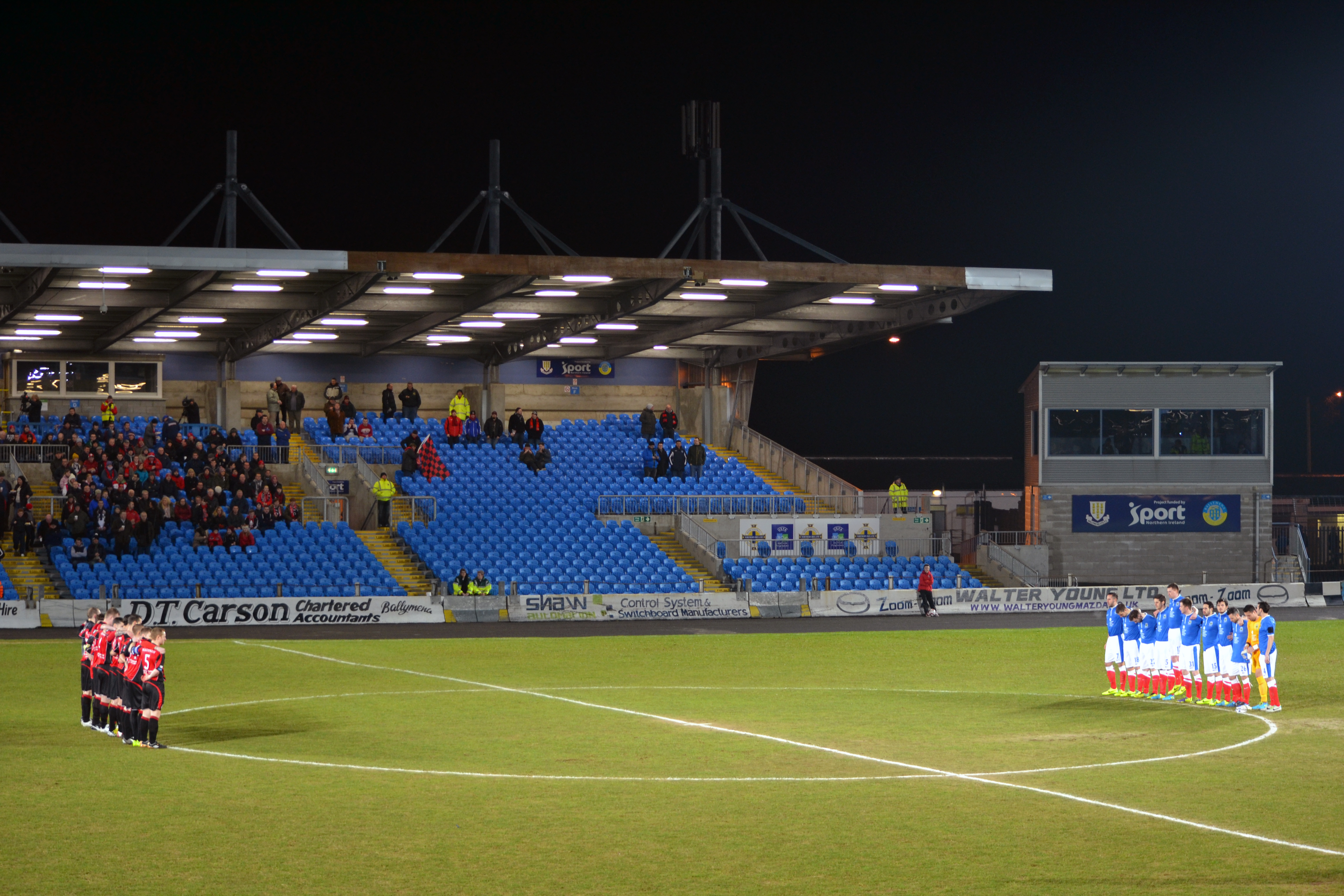
Linfield and Crusaders lining up before the 2013–14 County Antrim Shield final. Linfield would go on to win the Shield 4–1 on penalties. It was David Jeffrey's final trophy as Linfield manager.

The 2012–13 season was undoubtedly a low ebb for the club under Jeffrey's reign. The Blues were off the pace for most of the league campaign – their season encapsulated in a 3–1 home defeat by newly promoted Ballinamallard United in October 2012. Cliftonville were the eventual champions, securing their fourth league title after defeating Linfield 3–2 at Solitude on 13 April 2013. Crusaders secured the runners-up place, leaving the Blues in third place – a distant 29 points behind the champions. The club went out of the 2013 Setanta Sports Cup after a heavy aggregate defeat in the quarter-finals, went out of the League Cup at the semi-final stage, and exited the Irish Cup in the fifth round after a replay. The club's first Irish Cup defeat in four years was also the first time in 16 years they had lost their opening tie of the competition.

When the 2014 Setanta Sports Cup was confirmed in December 2013, the club opted not to enter the competition, citing inconvenient fixture scheduling, reduced prize money, and the difficulties faced for Linfield supporters to attend away games as the reasons behind their withdrawal. At the time, the club did not rule out future participation, however, they would never enter the competition again. League champions Cliftonville also withdrew from the competition for similar reasons, with the next two highest placed sides from the previous season's league table (Ballinamallard United and Coleraine) being drafted in as replacements. In February 2014, Jeffrey announced that he would be stepping down at the end of the 2013–14 season, bringing an end to his trophy-laden reign after 17 years. In March 2014, the Blues lifted the County Antrim Shield for a record 43rd time by defeating Crusaders 4–1 on penalties following a 0–0 draw after extra time in the final. This was a significant milestone for Jeffrey – his 31st and last trophy as Linfield manager, equalling Roy Coyle's record. Jeffrey still had the opportunity to win a record-breaking 32nd trophy as manager in the form of the 2013–14 league title. However, despite topping the league table for much of the season, the Blues had to settle for the runners-up spot, six points behind champions Cliftonville. Jeffrey's reign came to a winning end with a 5–2 victory over Glenavon on the final day of the 2013–14 league season.

=== Feeney & Healy (2014–present) ===
Former Northern Ireland international Warren Feeney succeeded Jeffrey as Linfield manager. Feeney had been player-assistant manager at English Conference Premier side Salisbury City at the time of his appointment. His cousin, Lee Feeney, played for Linfield in two spells between 1997–1999 and 2002–2003. Former Blackburn Rovers player, Andy Todd, was appointed as Feeney's assistant. Feeney's only full season in charge of the club ended without silverware. The Blues challenged for the league title for most of the season, but ultimately had to settle for the runners-up spot for the second successive season, behind champions Crusaders. One positive for the season was the team's record in the four "Big Two" league derbies against Glentoran, of which the Blues won three and drew the other. The lowest point of the season for the team was undoubtedly a shock 1–0 loss against second-tier side Ballyclare Comrades in the second round of the 2014–15 League Cup, while their 2014–15 Irish Cup campaign ended when they were eliminated in the quarter-finals after losing 3–2 to eventual runners-up Portadown.

In May 2015, the Blues were invited to compete in the Setanta Sports Cup scheduled to take place in June 2015. The club declined once again, with inconvenient fixture scheduling still remaining a concern. The competition was ultimately cancelled, when suitable fixture dates could not be agreed upon. With the Blues top of the table after 10 games of the 2015–16 NIFL Premiership season, Feeney's reign came to an end in October 2015, when he resigned to become assistant manager (and subsequently the manager) of English Football League Two side Newport County.

Former Northern Ireland striker and the country's all-time record international goalscorer David Healy was appointed as Feeney's successor, with Andy Todd staying on as Healy's assistant manager. However, in January 2016 Todd also departed the club to join Newport County and reunite with Warren Feeney, who had subsequently been promoted to County's manager following the departure of John Sheridan. Todd once again became Feeney's assistant manager.

Linfield Football Club has made history in the Northern Irish football scene during the reign of David Healy.

Linfield lifted the 2016/17 Irish League title by a marginal 2 points, with Crusaders F.C. coming second. The Blues also won the Irish Cup.

In the 2018/19 season, Linfield reclaimed the Irish League title after finishing fourth in the previous season.

The curtailed 2019/20 season saw Linfield win the title for a second consecutive season. In the same season, Linfield embarked on a memorable European campaign, marginally losing to Qarabağ FK in the UEFA Europa League qualification finals after impressive victories over FK Sutjeska Niksic and Havnar Boltfelag in the semi-finals and quarter-finals respectively.

The 2020/21 season (in which Northern Irish football fully returned from COVID-19), saw Coleraine and Glentoran emerge as their primary rivals for the title. In the end, Linfield acquired their third title in a row. They also secured their forty-fourth Irish Cup.

Cliftonville were in contention for the championship for the whole 2021/22 season. Linfield won the title by a single point, their fourth consecutive championship.

Linfield came agonisingly close to reaching the UEFA Conference League proper in the 2022/23 season after losing to FK RFS in the qualification finals. However, the team exhibited a commendable performance throughout this European campaign. In the domestic league a revamped Larne squad beat Linfield to the NIFL Premiership 2022/23 title after a tight title race between the two teams.

== League and cup history ==
=== Recent seasons ===
Season	League								Irish Cup	League Cup	Europe		Notes
Season	Pos.	P	W	D	L	GF	GA	Pts.	Result	Result	Competition	Result	Notes
2014–15	2nd	38	21	9	8	67	46	72	QF	2R	UEL	2QR	–
2015–16	2nd	38	26	5	7	91	35	83	RU	3R	UEL	2QR	–
2016–17	1st	38	27	8	3	87	24	89	W	3R	UEL	1QR	^{[A]}
2017–18	4th	38	20	7	11	72	45	67	QF	QF	UCL	2QR	^{[B]}
2018–19	1st	38	26	7	5	77	27	85	Last 16	W	Did not qualify		
2019–20	1st	31	22	3	6	71	24	69	Last 32	SF	UCL, UEL	1QR, POR	^{[C]}
2020–21	1st	38	24	6	8	83	38	78	W	–	UCL, UEL	1QR, 2QR	^{[D]}
2021–22	1st	38	24	11	3	67	24	83	Last 16	QF	UCL, UECL	1QR, 3QR	–
2022-23	2nd	38	23	8	7	75	27	77	Last 16	W	UCL, UEL, UECL	2QR, 3QR, POR	-
2023-24	2nd	38	26	7	5	82	40	85	RU	W	UECL	2QR	-
2024-25	1st	38	27	4	7	69	28	85	Last 16	2R	UECL	1QR	-

A. County Antrim Shield winners.
B. NIFL Charity Shield winners.
C. League was curtailed after 31 games and awarded on points per game average as a result of the COVID-19 pandemic in Northern Ireland.
D. League Cup competition was not held as a result of the COVID-19 pandemic in Northern Ireland.

== Stadium ==
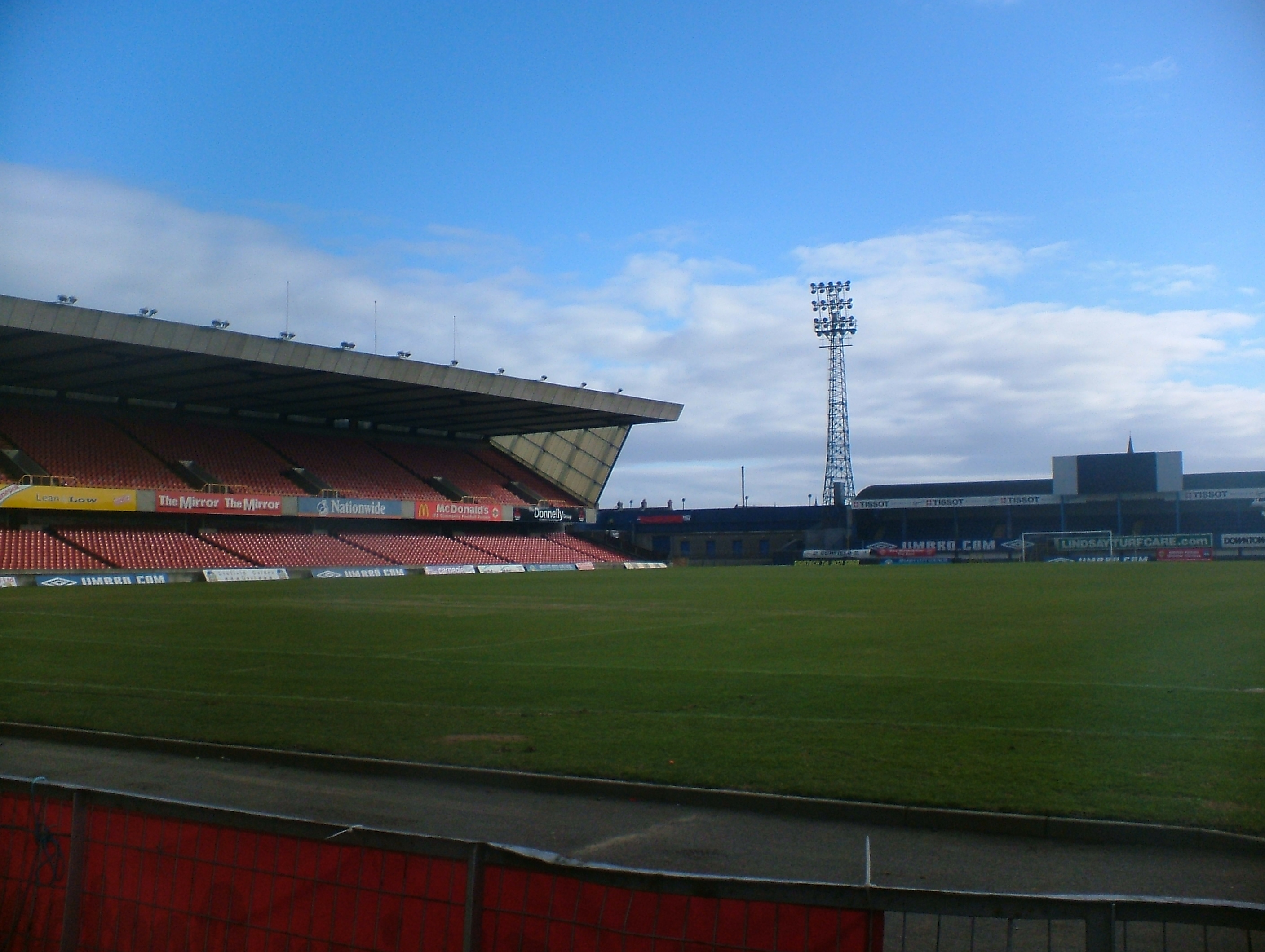
Windsor Park prior to the 2014 redevelopment. The ground has been the club's home since 1905.

Since 1905, Windsor Park in south Belfast has been Linfield's home ground. In the initial years after the club was formed in 1886, Linfield had to change grounds several times for various reasons such as housing development. The numerous ground changes and the club's desire to have a permanent home with which to build an identity resulted in the purchase of a piece of land known as the 'bog meadows' just off lower Windsor Avenue on 1 October 1904. Later known as Windsor Park, this became the club's permanent home as well as the venue for international matches. The first game at Windsor took place on 29 August 1905, with Linfield playing out a 0–0 draw against Distillery in a friendly match arranged to officially commemorate the opening of the stadium. The first competitive game played at the stadium took place just a few days later on 2 September 1905, and ended with a 1–0 win for Linfield over Glentoran – the other half of the "Big Two" Belfast teams – though Belfast Celtic were Linfield's main rivals at the time.

Windsor Park is the largest Association football stadium in Northern Ireland, with Glentoran's ground, the Oval, being the next largest. The governing body of Northern Irish football, the Irish Football Association, manages the stadium, while Linfield retains ownership of the land. In 2012, Linfield and the IFA were in talks to agree a new 51-year contract for the use of Windsor Park. The club would receive an annual payment as rent for the IFA to use the ground for the Northern Ireland national football team, but would no longer receive 15% of the ticket sales, TV rights, and commercial rights from international matches as they did under the old agreement. The 51-year agreement took effect from May 2014, with Linfield receiving an annual payment of £200,000 - subject to review (being adjusted for inflation etc.) every four years. This was increased to £214,000 per year in 2018, and due to increase again in 2022. The contract will expire in 2065.

In 2010, UEFA provided €500,000 towards substantial refurbishment of the stadium, to increase capacity and improve safety. The following year, the Northern Ireland Executive allocated £138 million for a major programme of stadium redevelopment throughout Northern Ireland, with £28 million allocated to the redevelopment of Windsor Park. In June 2012, further details of the stadium's redevelopment were released. The plan was to redevelop Windsor Park into an 18,000 all-seater stadium with a series of phased works originally intended to begin in the middle of 2013. The redevelopment would include the demolition of the existing East and South Stand structures, to be replaced by new purpose built stands that would partially enclose the stadium; complete renovation of the existing North and West Stands; and construction of both new conferencing facilities and a new headquarters facility for the IFA.

In February 2013, planning permission for the redevelopment was granted. The cost of the project was estimated to be around £29.2 million, of which £25.2 million would come from government funding. It was initially planned for the work to begin in September 2013. Two months later however, Crusaders began legal proceedings against the redevelopment. The club called for the process to be judicially reviewed, believing it to be against European Union competition laws and also a form of State aid towards Linfield. They, along with other Irish League clubs, felt that this gives Linfield an unfair advantage by allowing them to offer more attractive wages and have a larger squad than all of the other clubs. When Crusaders played Linfield at Windsor Park at the end of April, their club officials were allegedly informed that they would not be welcome in the directors box or the boardroom during the game – an apparent reaction to Crusaders' legal challenge of the stadium redevelopment. In a hearing that took place on 22 May 2013, Crusaders' request was granted. It was ruled that it was a possibility for the redevelopment to be classed as state aid towards Linfield. The aspect of the challenge concerning competition law however, was dismissed.

In July 2013, Crusaders agreed to a possible settlement brought forward by the judicial review. The details of the settlement were not made public, but Crusaders said that it had the "potential to benefit the entirety of the football family". In September 2013, sports minister Carál Ní Chuilín said that she was still committed to making sure the redevelopment went ahead as scheduled, after previously stating that she would not sign off on the funding until the IFA resolved "governance issues" surrounding David Martin's return to the role of deputy president.

In December 2013, three months after the work was originally scheduled to begin, the redevelopment was finally given the green light. The sports minister signed off on £31 million to complete the project. The redevelopment finally got under way on 6 May 2014 after the 2013–14 domestic season had finished, eight months later than originally planned. On 31 March 2015, the West Stand of the stadium was sealed off after cracks in the structure were discovered. Construction work related to the stadium redevelopment had been ongoing behind the stand in the weeks prior to the damage, but it was not known if that was directly related. Originally planned for refurbishment as part of the redevelopment, the West Stand was demolished and rebuilt. The redevelopment was completed in October 2016, with an official capacity of 18,434.

== Supporters and rivalry ==
=== Big Two rivalry ===
Linfield's main rival is Glentoran from east Belfast – a rivalry which is commonly referred to as the Big Two. However, this term did not always refer to Linfield and Glentoran; until 1949, the Big Two consisted of Linfield and Belfast Celtic, for they had traditionally, up to that point, been the two most successful clubs in Northern Irish football. However, after Belfast Celtic withdrew from the league in 1949, Glentoran gradually established itself as Linfield's biggest rival. The earliest recorded match between the two clubs was played on 1 October 1887 – just over a year after Linfield's formation. A friendly match played at King's Field, Westbourne in Ballymacarrett was won 3–1 by Linfield (then known as Linfield Athletic). In 1890, the two teams played each other competitively for the first time, during the inaugural Irish League season. Linfield won 7–0 at Musgrave Park on 18 October, and 6–0 at Ulsterville Avenue on 21 March 1891. The first meeting at the Oval took place on 8 October 1892, and the first meeting at Windsor Park took place 13 years later on 2 September 1905.

During the Second World War in 1941, the Oval – including most of Glentoran's assets – was severely damaged in a German aerial bombing raid on the nearby Harland & Wolff shipyard. Glentoran approached Distillery F.C to play at Grosvenor Park, which they did until the Oval was rebuilt with help from other clubs. During this time, Glentoran considered resigning from senior football to become a junior club, but after borrowing kits from Distillery and Crusaders they continued to compete at Grosvenor until 1949. Out of 14 league games at Grosvenor Park however, they were only victorious over Linfield on one occasion.

Traditionally, the two clubs play each other in the league on Boxing Day every year, with the match usually attracting the largest attendance of any league match that season. In 2009, the Irish Football Association initially banned the fixture from taking place on Boxing Day for two years due to crowd trouble at Windsor Park. However, this decision was later reversed on appeal, and the fixture returned to the calendar. Ultimately, however, the 2009 and 2010 fixtures did not take place in the end anyway, as they were both postponed due to bad weather. The fixture returned to the fixture list in 2011, with each club hosting the match in alternate years.

=== Trophy dominance ===
Linfield and Glentoran have been the two most successful clubs in Northern Irish football to date, regularly being the two main contenders for the major domestic honours. They have won more league titles, Irish Cups, and League Cups than any other clubs. Linfield hold the record for the most League titles (57), Irish Cups (44), and League Cups (10). In comparison, Glentoran have won 23 league titles, 23 Irish Cups, and 7 League Cups. Almost half (47.2%) of the 142 Irish Cup competitions to date have been won by one of the two clubs, with at least one of the clubs reaching the final on 92 occasions (64.8% of all finals), winning the cup a combined 67 times. Of those 92 finals, the two clubs have met in 15 of them – making it the most common final. Linfield have won eight of the head-to-head final meetings compared to Glentoran's seven wins, with the most recent meeting between the two clubs in the final occurring in 2006, when Linfield won 2–1 to lift the Cup for the 37th time. Almost two-thirds (65.3%) of all Irish League titles have been won by one of the Big Two. Of the 121 completed league seasons, the title has been won by either club on 79 occasions. The duo also make up two of the three clubs that have appeared in every season of the Irish League since its inception in 1890; the other club being Cliftonville.

Up to and including the 2021–22 season, the two clubs have played each other 281 times (Note: Excluding unofficial wartime results between 1915 and 1919 (First World War) and 1940–1947 (Second World War).) in the Irish League since its formation in 1890. Linfield have won 126 of the meetings, with 77 Glentoran victories and 78 drawn matches. Linfield's record victory over their rivals is 8–0. This occurred on 21 November 1891, during the 1891–92 Irish League season. Linfield's record post-war win over Glentoran in all competitions is by a six-goal margin – a 7–1 win over the Glens at Grosvenor Park in the 1961–62 North-South Cup, and a 6–0 victory at Windsor Park in the 2006 Setanta Sports Cup group stage.

Since 2009, the rivalry has not been as intense as it once was, with the Big Two's domination of the domestic game decreasing as competitiveness across the league has improved. This is partly due to the resurgence of North Belfast derby rivals Cliftonville and Crusaders, and to a lesser extent Coleraine and Glenavon. In 2013, Cliftonville became the first club other than Linfield or Glentoran to win the league title since Portadown in 2002. In 2014, Cliftonville went on to retain the title for the first time in their history, with Crusaders then winning the 2014–15 title in convincing fashion, finishing 10 points ahead of runners-up Linfield. During this time, Glentoran lifted the Irish Cup in 2013, 2015 and 2020, however the club has gone 13 years without a league title, winning only three titles since the turn of the 21st century; in 2002–03, 2004–05 and 2008–09. Since then, they have finished as low as ninth place in the 2016–17 season. The last season in which the two clubs finished as champions and runners-up in either order was 2008–09, and they have not met in a major domestic cup final since 2006, when they contested both the Irish Cup and the League Cup finals.

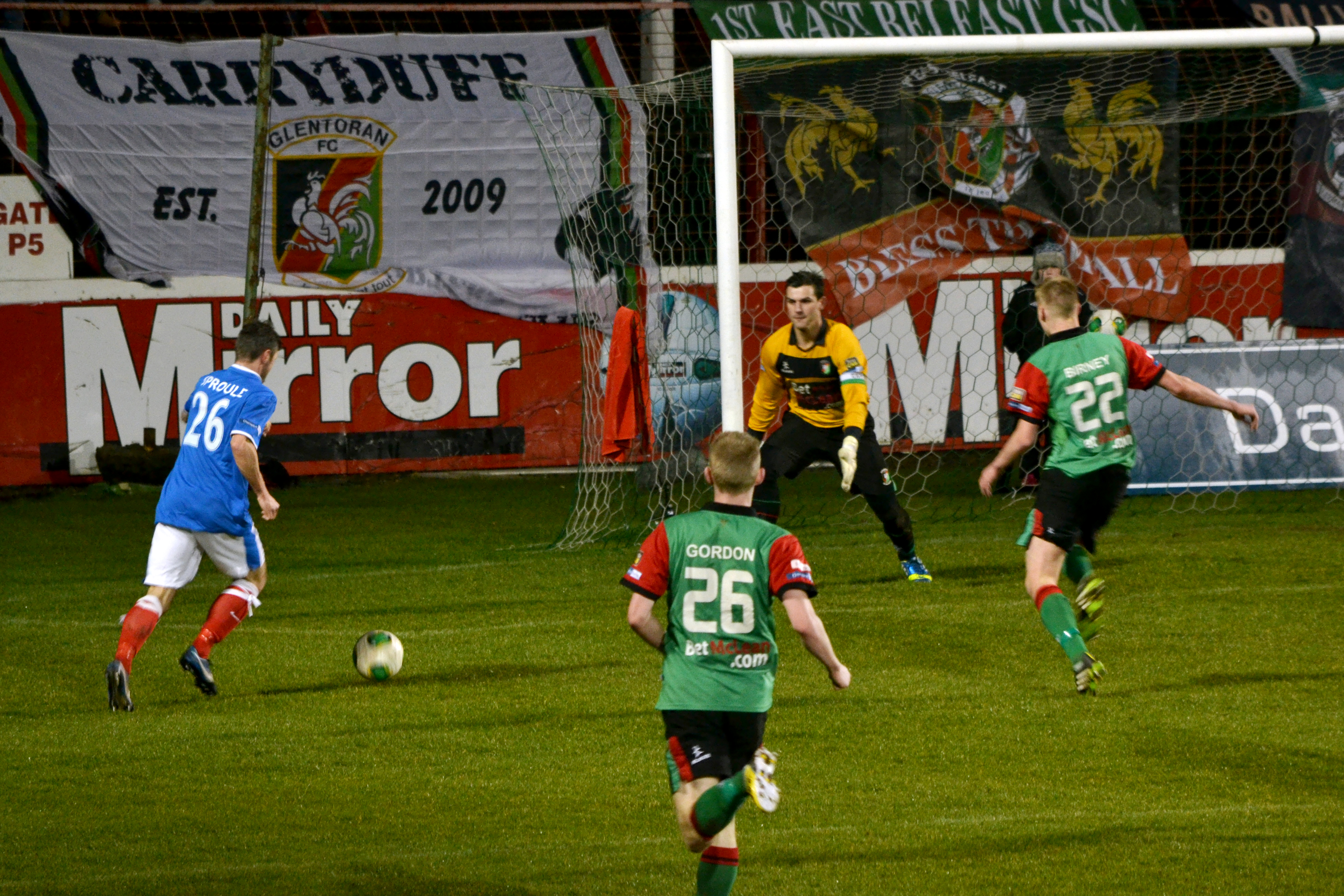
Action from a Big Two Derby played at the Oval in February 2014. Linfield won the match 1–0.

=== Sectarianism and violence ===
Linfield are regarded as a 'Protestant club' due to them drawing the vast majority of their support from that side of the community. The club has also been regarded as sectarian in the past, both in respect of its alleged employment policy and of the repeated behaviour of its fans. This sectarian reputation is partly the result of the actions of fans who have a history of anti-Catholic behaviour ranging from sectarian chanting on the terraces to outright physical violence. Part of the problem has been attributed to Windsor Park's location in a part of Belfast that was once predominantly Protestant. A relatively small number of local Catholics played for the club during the Troubles, which led to a widespread accusation that the club held a historical policy of not signing Catholic players. However, the existence of such a policy has been continually refuted:

"Linfield's following has historically been drawn from the Protestant loyalist community, particularly in the greater Belfast area. That is a fact of life which cannot be disputed and, although in the past there have been accusations of sectarian bias such as not signing Roman Catholic players, contrary to opinion and myth, no ban was ever imposed. That even applied in the early stages, during the Second World War and from then there has been a plethora of all creeds and classes wearing the Blue jersey."

— Malcolm Brodie

Sectarian tensions have long been a cause of conflict at football matches in Northern Ireland since the 1920s, and crowd trouble occasionally marred games involving Linfield throughout the twentieth century. One of the most notable such instances occurred in 1948, at a Boxing Day match between Linfield and Belfast Celtic (a team whose support was largely composed of Catholics and Irish nationalists). Immediately following a 1–1 draw in which Linfield scored in the last minute, there was a pitch invasion by Linfield supporters. In the ensuing violence, three Belfast Celtic players were seriously injured, including Protestant striker Jimmy Jones, who was left unconscious and suffered a broken leg. Belfast Celtic subsequently withdrew from the league in protest at the end of the 1948–49 season.

In the 1979–80 European Cup, Linfield were drawn to face Dundalk from the Republic of Ireland. In the first leg, which was played in Dundalk and ended in a 1–1 draw, crowd disturbance prompted UEFA to switch the second leg to the Haarlem Stadion, Netherlands. Linfield were held almost entirely accountable for the events, and were forced to pay Dundalk's costs to travel to the Netherlands as well as an additional £5,000 for damage sustained to Oriel Park. Dundalk were fined £870 for providing insufficient security at the match. Dundalk eventually won the match 2–0 to progress 3–1 on aggregate. In the 1987–88 campaign, Linfield's home game against Lillestrøm was marred by missile throwing, resulting in UEFA sanctions which meant that the club had to play their next two home games in European competitions at Welsh club Wrexham in 1988–89 and 1989–90.

A 1997 match against Coleraine was abandoned when Linfield fans hurled bottles onto the pitch after two Linfield players were sent off. In May 2005 there were disturbances in Dublin at the Setanta Cup final between Linfield and Shelbourne. In the same month, Linfield fans were banned from travelling to the Oval for a match against Glentoran, allegedly as a result of disturbances involving both sets of fans the previous month. However, Glentoran denied this was the reason behind the ban, citing health and safety regulations that forced them to close the away stand. In 2008, three Linfield fans were charged in a Dublin court with public order offences at a Setanta Cup match against St Patrick's Athletic, but were released.

The management of Linfield has continually attempted to reverse the stigma of negative press attached to the club. The club has moved forward in co-operation with the Irish Football Association, which has launched a campaign called "Give sectarianism the boot." It assisted a local Camogie team who needed space to train in 2005, and also built links with the Gaelic Athletic Association which has traditionally had little support from the Protestant community in Northern Ireland. In 2006 FIFA officially commended Linfield for their anti-racism initiatives. A play dealing with the conflict between Linfield and Belfast Celtic, Lish and Gerry at the Shrine, was staged by the IFA at Windsor Park in October 2010, with the co-operation of the Linfield management.

Since 2008, the number of incidents has significantly decreased. However, in February 2014, Linfield were fined £3,000 and Cliftonville were fined £3,250 by the IFA following sectarian chanting from sections of both sets of supporters during a County Antrim Shield semi-final at Windsor Park in October 2013. Cliftonville's fine of an extra £250 came as a result of their fans causing a big bang during the game. Both clubs criticised the decision, and expressed their intent to appeal against the fines. In April 2014, the punishments were rescinded on appeal. There was also crowd trouble at a league fixture between the clubs at Windsor Park in March 2014, with reports of missiles being thrown after the game. The Northern Ireland Football League condemned the actions of a "small minority" of supporters.

In May 2014, Linfield were fined £1,200 by the Irish Football Association over the singing of sectarian songs by supporters, ruling that Linfield fans had been guilty of breaching the code of conduct during a league game at Coleraine.

In a Champions League qualifier match on 14 July 2017, some Linfield supporters threw bottles and coins at Celtic players. Although both a section of Linfield fans and the small group of visiting fans sang sectarian songs, it was noted that a much larger section of Linfield fans booed and drowned out these songs.

In 2022, the club reportedly "ended its voluntary association" with one of the coaches of its girls' academy after the man admitted being involved in singing a chant, which was described as "gratuitous[ly] sectarian" and condemned by senior members of the Orange Order, Ulster Unionists, DUP, Sinn Féin, Alliance Party and the Northern Ireland Secretary of State.

== European record ==
As Northern Ireland's most dominant club side, Linfield have been regular competitors in European football. The club first participated in European competition in 1959 against Göteborg in the 1959–60 European Cup. In the first round of the 1961–62 European Cup, Linfield were drawn to face an East German team, Vorwärts. The away leg was played, which Linfield lost 3–0. However, Vorwärts were denied visas to enter the UK to play the second leg, and (similarly to Glenavon the previous season) travelling to play the second leg in a neutral country was not financially viable for Linfield. They were therefore forced to withdraw from the competition.

Linfield's most notable achievement in European competition to date is reaching the quarter-finals of the 1966–67 European Cup. After beating Aris of Luxembourg and Vålerenga of Norway they faced CSKA Red Flag of Bulgaria in the last eight. This resulted in a 2–2 draw at home and 1–0 defeat away. In the 1984–85 season, after overcoming Shamrock Rovers on away goals (the first and so far only series of meetings between the two Irish superpowers outside all-Ireland tournaments), Linfield faced eventual semi-finalists Panathinaikos in the second round. After a 2–1 defeat in Greece, Linfield raced into a 3–0 lead at half-time in the second leg at Windsor Park. However, Panathinaikos staged a remarkable comeback in the second half to level the match at 3–3 and eliminate Linfield 5–4 on aggregate.

The 1993–94 UEFA Champions League saw Linfield drawn with Dinamo Tbilisi of Georgia. After losing 3–2 on aggregate, they were later reinstated when the Georgian side were expelled from the competition for alleged match fixing and bribing officials. Linfield faced Copenhagen in the first round proper. They won the first leg 3–0, but lost the second leg 4–0 after extra time. This proved costly, as victory would have meant a financially lucrative tie against eventual champions A.C. Milan in the next round. The club then had to wait seven years to participate in the competition again, due to the format of the two European competitions being altered. The league's relatively low ranking in the UEFA coefficient system has meant that the club has entered in the early qualifying rounds of either the UEFA Champions League or the UEFA Cup/Europa League, with the Blues becoming the first Irish League side to reach the play-off round of the Europa League in 2019. In the 2012–13 UEFA Champions League, the Blues entered the competition in the first qualifying round, and defeated B36 Tórshavn 4–3 on penalties to progress to the second qualifying round, after both legs ended as 0–0 draws. This was the first time since the 1984–85 season (excluding their opponent's expulsion in 1993–94) that the club had won a tie in the competition. However, they were defeated 3–0 on aggregate in the next round by AEL Limassol.

The 2013–14 UEFA Europa League campaign started in record-breaking fashion. In July 2013, the club won 2–0 away from home against ÍF Fuglafjørður of the Faroe Islands in the first qualifying round. This was the Blues' first win in Europe since 2005, and their first away win in Europe since 1966, when they defeated Vålerenga 4–1 during their run to the quarter-finals of the 1966–67 European Cup. In the second leg at Windsor Park, the Blues won 3–0 to go through to the next round 5–0 on aggregate. This was the club's largest aggregate victory in a European tie since defeating Aris Bonnevoie 9–4 on aggregate in the first round of the 1966–67 European Cup. It was also the first time that a Northern Irish club had won both legs of a European tie in any competition. They followed this up in the next round by winning away from home again. Despite being massive underdogs for the tie, a 1–0 victory away to Xanthi of Greece made it three consecutive victories in Europe, without conceding a goal in the process – another first for the club. However, in the second leg at home they went down 2–1 after extra time, which eliminated them on the away goals rule.

The following season, Linfield's first venture into Europe under new manager Warren Feeney was in the Faroe Islands against B36 Tórshavn in the 2014–15 UEFA Europa League first qualifying round, which was also Feeney's first competitive game in charge of the club. Linfield came out 2–1 victors with goals coming from Jamie Mulgrew and Michael Carvill. The return leg was played at Glenavon's ground, Mourneview Park, due to the redevelopment of Windsor Park. Linfield had to settle for a 1–1 draw, but that was enough to secure passage into the second qualifying round for the second successive season, where they were drawn to face AIK from Sweden. An 87th-minute Andrew Waterworth goal in the home leg at Mourneview Park ensured a 1–0 win for Linfield in their 100th competitive European match since their debut in 1959. However, the Blues fell to a 2–0 defeat in the away leg, which meant they were eliminated 2–1 on aggregate.

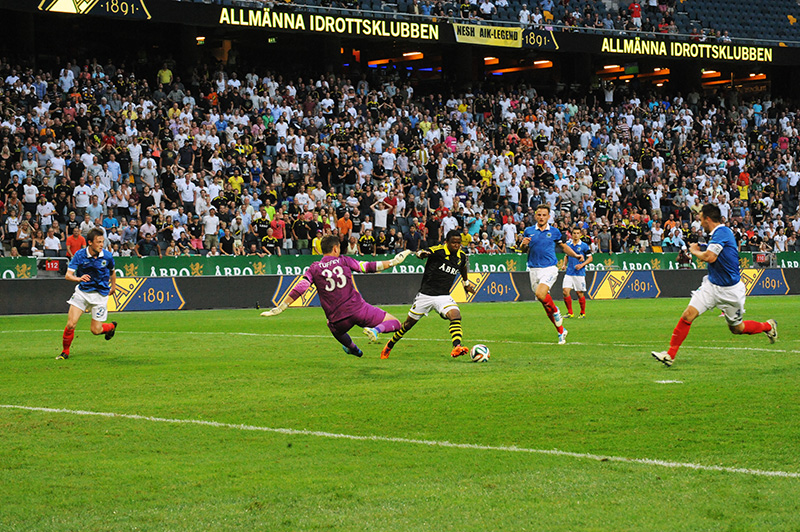
Linfield playing against Allsvenskan side AIK in the second leg of the 2014–15 UEFA Europa League second qualifying round. The match was played at the Friends Arena, Solna on 24 July 2014.

As 2018–19 NIFL Premiership champions, Linfield initially entered the 2019–20 UEFA Champions League first qualifying round, where they were drawn to face Rosenborg. In naming Charlie Allen to the final 25-man squad for this match, the Blues set a new record for the youngest UK player named to a final squad for a match in the Champions League. The Norwegian champions had eliminated the Blues from the competition back in the 2010–11 season, and again they proved to be too strong. A 6–0 aggregate defeat saw the Blues drop down into the UEFA Europa League second qualifying round Champions Path, where they faced Faroese champions HB Tórshavn – the fifth occasion since 2012 that they had faced Faroese opposition in Europe. A 3–2 win on aggregate secured a place in the third qualifying round of the Europa League for the first time, and the third stage of any European competition since a 5–2 aggregate win over Vålerenga in November 1966.

In the next round of the Europa League Linfield faced Montenegro champions Sutjeska. A 2–1 win in the away leg was followed up with a 3–2 win in the second leg at Windsor Park, with the Blues winning 5–3 on aggregate to become the first Irish League side to reach the play-off round of the Europa League. It was only the second time that the club had won both legs of a European tie – the first being in 2013 against ÍF. Additionally, it was only the second time that the club had ever progressed through back-to-back rounds in Europe, again the first time since November 1966. In the play-off round, Linfield were drawn to face Azerbaijan champions Qarabağ, with the winners qualifying for the Europa League group stage.

=== Summary ===
As of 3 August 2023

Competition	P	W	D	L	GF	GA	GD	Win %
European Cup / UEFA Champions League	78	11	23	44	66	139	−73	14.10%
UEFA Cup / UEFA Europa League	43	13	9	21	49	78	−29	30.23%
UEFA Europa Conference League	10	2	3	5	16	17	–1	20.00%
European Cup Winner's Cup / UEFA Cup Winner's Cup	6	2	0	4	6	11	−5	33.33%
Inter-Cities Fairs Cup	4	1	0	3	3	11	−8	25.00%
Total	141	29	35	77	140	256	–116	20.57%

=== Matches (1959–1999) ===
Season	Competition	Round	Opponent	Home	Away	Agg
1959–60	European Cup	PR	(Sweden) Göteborg	2–1	1–6	3–7
1961–62	European Cup	PR	(East Germany) Vorwärts Berlin	w/o	0–3	0–3
1962–63	European Cup	1R	(Denmark) Esbjerg	1–2	0–0	1–2
1963–64	European Cup Winners' Cup	2R	(Turkey) Fenerbahçe	2–0	1–4	3–4
1966–67	European Cup	1R	(Luxembourg) Aris	6–1	3–3	9–4
1966–67	European Cup	2R	(Norway) Vålerenga	1–1	4–1	5–2
1966–67	European Cup	QF	(Bulgaria) CSKA Red Flag	2–2	0–1	2–3
1967–68	Inter-Cities Fairs Cup	1R	(East Germany) Lokomotive Leipzig	1–0	1–5	2–5
1968–69	Inter-Cities Fairs Cup	1R	(Portugal) Vitória de Setúbal	1–3	0–3	1–6
1969–70	European Cup	1R	(Socialist Federal Republic of Yugoslavia) Red Star Belgrade	2–4	0–8	2–12
1970–71	European Cup Winners' Cup	1R	(England) Manchester City	2–1	0–1	2–2(a)
1971–72	European Cup	1R	(Belgium) Standard Liège	2–3	0–2	2–5
1975–76	European Cup	1R	(Netherlands) PSV Eindhoven	1–2	0–8	1–10
1978–79	European Cup	1R	(Norway) Lillestrøm	0–0	0–1	0–1
1979–80	European Cup	PR	(Republic of Ireland) Dundalk	0–2	1–1	1–3
1980–81	European Cup	1R	(France) Nantes	0–1	0–2	0–3
1981–82	UEFA Cup	1R	(Belgium) Beveren	0–5	0–3	0–8
1982–83	European Cup	1R	(Albania) 17 Nëntori	2–1	0–1	2–2(a)
1983–84	European Cup	1R	(Portugal) Benfica	2–3	0–3	2–6
1984–85	European Cup	1R	(Republic of Ireland) Shamrock Rovers	0–0	1–1	1–1(a)
1984–85	European Cup	2R	(Greece) Panathinaikos	3–3	1–2	4–5
1985–86	European Cup	1R	(Switzerland) Servette	2–2	1–2	3–4
1986–87	European Cup	1R	(Norway) Rosenborg	1–1	0–1	1–2
1987–88	European Cup	1R	(Norway) Lillestrøm	2–4	1–1	3–5
1988–89	UEFA Cup	1R	(Finland) TPS	1–1	0–0	1–1(a)
1989–90	European Cup	1R	(Soviet Union) Dnipro Dnipropetrovsk	1–2	0–1	1–3
1993–94	UEFA Champions League	PR	(Georgia (country)) Dinamo Tbilisi	1–1	1–2	2–3
1993–94	UEFA Champions League	1R	(Denmark) Copenhagen	3–0	0–4 (a.e.t.)	3–4
1994–95	UEFA Cup	PR	(Iceland) FH	3–1	0–1	3–2
1994–95	UEFA Cup	1R	(Denmark) Odense	1–1	0–5	1–6
1995–96	UEFA Cup Winners' Cup	QR	(Ukraine) Shakhtar Donetsk	0–1	1–4	1–5
1998–99	UEFA Cup	1QR	(Cyprus) Omonia	5–3	1–5	6–8
1999–2000	UEFA Cup	QR	(Georgia (country)) Locomotive Tbilisi	1–1	0–1	1–2

=== Matches (2000–) ===
Season	Competition	Round	Opponent	Home	Away	Agg
2000–01	UEFA Champions League	1QR	(Finland) Haka	2–1	0–1	2–2(a)
2001–02	UEFA Champions League	1QR	(Georgia (country)) Torpedo Kutaisi	0–0	0–1	0–1
2002–03	UEFA Cup	QR	(Norway) Stabæk	1–1	0–4	1–5
2004–05	UEFA Champions League	1QR	(Finland) HJK	0–1	0–1	0–2
2005–06	UEFA Cup	1QR	(Latvia) Ventspils	1–0	1–2	2–2(a)
2005–06	UEFA Cup	2QR	(Sweden) Halmstad	2–4	1–1	3–5
2006–07	UEFA Champions League	1QR	(Slovenia) Gorica	1–3	2–2	3–5
2007–08	UEFA Champions League	1QR	(Sweden) Elfsborg	0–0	0–1	0–1
2008–09	UEFA Champions League	1QR	(Croatia) Dinamo Zagreb	0–2	1–1	1–3
2009–10	UEFA Europa League	1QR	(Denmark) Randers	0–3	0–4	0–7
2010–11	UEFA Champions League	2QR	(Norway) Rosenborg	0–0	0–2	0–2
2011–12	UEFA Champions League	2QR	(Belarus) BATE Borisov	1–1	0–2	1–3
2012–13	UEFA Champions League	1QR	(Faroe Islands) B36 Tórshavn	0–0	0–0 (a.e.t.)	0–0 (4–3 p)
2012–13	UEFA Champions League	2QR	(Cyprus) AEL Limassol	0–0	0–3	0–3
2013–14	UEFA Europa League	1QR	(Faroe Islands) ÍF	3–0	2–0	5–0
2013–14	UEFA Europa League	2QR	(Greece) Xanthi	1–2 (a.e.t.)	1–0	2–2(a)
2014–15	UEFA Europa League	1QR	(Faroe Islands) B36 Tórshavn	1–1	2–1	3–2
2014–15	UEFA Europa League	2QR	(Sweden) AIK	1–0	0–2	1–2
2015–16	UEFA Europa League	1QR	(Faroe Islands) NSÍ Runavík	2–0	3–4	5–4
2015–16	UEFA Europa League	2QR	(Slovakia) Spartak Trnava	1–3	1–2	2–5
2016–17	UEFA Europa League	1QR	(Republic of Ireland) Cork City	0–1	1–1	1–2
2017–18	UEFA Champions League	1QR	(San Marino) La Fiorita	1–0	0–0	1–0
2017–18	UEFA Champions League	2QR	(Scotland) Celtic	0–2	0–4	0–6
2019–20 (UCL · UEL)	UEFA Champions League	1QR	(Norway) Rosenborg	0–2	0–4	0–6
2019–20 (UCL · UEL)	UEFA Europa League	2QR	(Faroe Islands) HB Tórshavn	1–0	2–2	3–2
2019–20 (UCL · UEL)	UEFA Europa League	3QR	(Montenegro) Sutjeska	3–2	2–1	5–3
2019–20 (UCL · UEL)	UEFA Europa League	POR	(Azerbaijan) Qarabağ	3–2	1–2	4–4(a)
2020–21 (UCL · UEL)	UEFA Champions League	PR (SF)	(San Marino) Tre Fiori	2–0		
2020–21 (UCL · UEL)	UEFA Champions League	PR (F)	(Kosovo) Drita	3–0		
2020–21 (UCL · UEL)	UEFA Champions League	1QR	(Poland) Legia Warsaw		0–1	
2020–21 (UCL · UEL)	UEFA Europa League	2QR	(Malta) Floriana	0–1		
2021–22 (UCL · UECL)	UEFA Champions League	1QR	(Lithuania) Žalgiris	1–2	1–3	2–5
2021–22 (UCL · UECL)	UEFA Europa Conference League	2QR	(Bosnia and Herzegovina) Borac Banja Luka	4–0	0–0	4–0
2021–22 (UCL · UECL)	UEFA Europa Conference League	3QR	(Luxembourg) Fola Esch	1–2	1–2	2–4
2022–23 (UCL · UEL · UECL)	UEFA Champions League	1QR	(Wales) The New Saints	2–0 (a.e.t.)	0–1	2–1
2022–23 (UCL · UEL · UECL)	UEFA Champions League	2QR	(Norway) Bodø/Glimt	1–0	0–8	1–8
2022–23 (UCL · UEL · UECL)	UEFA Europa League	3QR	(Switzerland) Zürich	0–2	0–3	0–5
2022–23 (UCL · UEL · UECL)	UEFA Europa Conference League	POR	(Latvia) RFS	1–1	2–2	3–3 (2–4 p)
2023–24	UEFA Europa Conference League	1QR	(Albania) Vllaznia	3–1	0–1	3–2
2023–24	UEFA Europa Conference League	2QR	(Poland) Pogoń Szczecin	2–5	2–3	4–8
2024–25	UEFA Conference League	1QR	(Iceland) Stjarnan	3–2	0–2	3−4
2025–26 (UCL · UECL)	UEFA Champions League	1QR	(Republic of Ireland) Shelbourne	1–1	0–1	1−2
2025–26 (UCL · UECL)	UEFA Conference League	2QR	(Lithuania) Žalgiris	2–0	0–0	2–0
2025–26 (UCL · UECL)	UEFA Conference League	3QR	(Faroe Islands) Víkingur Gøta	2–0	1–2	3–2
2025–26 (UCL · UECL)	UEFA Conference League	POR	(Republic of Ireland) Shelbourne	0–2	1–3	1–5

Key: PR – Preliminary round; QR – Qualifying round; 1/2/3QR – First/Second/Third qualifying round; POR – Play-off round; 1R/2R – First/Second round; QF – Quarter-final; SF – Semi-final; F – Final;

Notes

1. Linfield goals are listed first.
2. Linfield were forced to withdraw from the competition when the second leg could not be played. UK officials refused to issue visas for the Vorwärts team to enter the country, and Linfield failed to find an alternative venue outside the UK to host the match.
3. Dinamo Tbilisi were later expelled from the competition, and Linfield were reinstated.
4. Home leg switched to Haarlem Stadion, Netherlands as a result of a UEFA sanction following crowd trouble in the away leg against Dundalk in the 1979–80 European Cup.
5. Home leg switched to the Racecourse Ground, Wales as a result of a UEFA sanction following crowd trouble against Lillestrøm in the 1987–88 European Cup.
6. In the three seasons between 1994–95 and 1996–97, UEFA Champions League entry was limited to clubs from the continent's top 24 countries. This meant that as 1993–94 Irish League champions, Linfield entered the UEFA Cup instead.
7. Transferred to the UEFA Europa League Champions Path after being eliminated in the UEFA Champions League qualifying rounds.
8. The preliminary round saw four clubs compete for one place in the first qualifying round, with two semi-finals and a final as single knockout matches hosted at a neutral venue, the Colovray Sports Centre in Nyon, Switzerland.
9. Linfield were awarded a 3–0 win by UEFA after the preliminary round final did not take place when two Drita players tested positive for COVID-19, resulting in their squad being quarantined by the Swiss authorities.
10. As a result of the COVID-19 pandemic, the qualifying round ties were played as single knockout matches instead of two legs, with the team that was drawn first hosting the match.
11. Transferred to the UEFA Europa Conference League Champions Path after being eliminated in the UEFA Champions League qualifying rounds.

=== UEFA club ranking ===
Current ranking

As of 26 September 2025

Rank	Team	Points
156	(Estonia) Flora	10.000
157	(Denmark) Brøndby	9.500
158	(Northern Ireland) Linfield	9.500
159	Austria Wien	9.500
160	(Northern Ireland) Larne F.C.	9.000

Ranking since 2020

Year	Rank	Points
2020	250	4.250
2021	226	5.250
2022	167	7.000
2023	159	8.500
2024	147	10.000

== Current squad ==
As of 31 August 2026

Note: Flags indicate national team as defined under FIFA eligibility rules; some limited exceptions apply. Players may hold more than one non-FIFA nationality.

No.	Pos.	Nation	Player
1	GK	NIR	Chris Johns
4	DF	IRL	Ryan Nolan
5	MF	IRL	Chris Shields
7	MF	NIR	Kirk Millar
8	MF	NIR	Kyle McClean
9	FW	SCO	Kieran Offord
10	MF	SCO	Adam Frizzell
14	MF	ENG	Kitt Nelson (on loan from Preston North End)
15	DF	NIR	Ben Hall
16	MF	SCO	Dylan Wells
18	GK	SCO	Aidan Glavin
19	MF	IRL	Rhys Brennan (on loan from Bohemians)
22	MF	NIR	Jamie Mulgrew (captain)
24	DF	NIR	Sean Brown
26	MF	NIR	Isaac Baird

No.	Pos.	Nation	Player
27	DF	NIR	Ethan McGee
29	FW	NIR	Matthew Fitzpatrick
30	FW	ENG	Kobei Moore
33	DF	IRL	Darragh Leahy
34	DF	NIR	Dane McCullough
36	FW	NIR	Rhys Annett
37	DF	NIR	Ryan McKay (on loan to Crusaders)
66	FW	NIR	Charlie Chapman
70	DF	NIR	Jon Graham (on loan to Loughgall)
71	MF	NIR	Finlay Ross
72	DF	NIR	Rhys Davidson
73	MF	NIR	Oliver Wade
74	DF	LTU	Donatas Jermakovas
75	GK	NIR	Daragh Rooney
78	MF	NIR	Harry Allen

=== Retired numbers ===
As of June 2011

Note: Flags indicate national team as defined under FIFA eligibility rules; some limited exceptions apply. Players may hold more than one non-FIFA nationality.

No.	Pos.	Nation	Player
11	DF	NIR	Noel Bailie MBE (one club man 1986–2011)
13			Unlucky number

== Player of the Year ==
Linfield's Player of the Year award is voted for by the club's supporters.

- 2008–09: Paul Munster
- 2009–10: Jamie Mulgrew
- 2010–11: Michael Gault
- 2011–12: Albert Watson
- 2012–13: Billy Joe Burns
- 2013–14: Andrew Waterworth
- 2014–15: Aaron Burns
- 2015–16: Jimmy Callacher
- 2016–17: Roy Carroll
- 2017–18: Kirk Millar
- 2018–19: Jimmy Callacher
- 2019–20: Stephen Fallon
- 2020–21: Shayne Lavery
- 2021–22: Chris Shields
- 2022–23: Daniel Finlayson
- 2023-24: Kyle McClean

== Managerial history ==
Below is a list of the managers Linfield have appointed during the club's history. In the early years after the club was formed in 1886, the team was selected by the club committee, a standard practice by football clubs at the time. Since then, 25 different men have held the position of Linfield first team coach/manager. However, only six have been appointed since Billy Campbell's departure in 1975. David Jeffrey holds the record for the longest reign as manager, having been in charge for 17 years and 16 weeks between 4 January 1997 and 26 April 2014. Jeffrey and Roy Coyle jointly hold the record for the most trophies won as manager, having led the club to 31 major honours each. Former Northern Ireland international Warren Feeney is the club's previous manager, having been appointed in May 2014. He resigned in October 2015 to become assistant manager of Newport County, with current manager David Healy appointed as his successor.

Dates	Name	Notes
1886–?	Team Committee	A committee was responsible for the first team.
Unknown	Lincoln Hyde	Manager for at least the 1932–33 season, possibly for longer.
1937–38	Tommy Sloan	
1939–1940	Billy McCleery	Resigned due to World War II, and concentrated on his Cricket career. Would later manage the Irish League XI team which defeated the Football League 5–2 at Windsor Park in 1956.
1940–1943	Tommy Brolly	
Unknown	Jack Challinor	
Unknown	John Hutton	
1952–1953	Tully Craig	
Unknown	Gibby Mackenzie	
1957–1960	Jackie Milburn	Joined as player-manager from Newcastle United.
1960–1962	Isaac McDowell	Guided the club to seven trophies in the 1961–62 season, before leaving to manage Glentoran the following season.
1962–1965	Tommy Dickson	Captain of the Linfield team which famously won seven trophies in the 1961–62 season.
1965–1967	Tommy Leishman	Joined as player-manager from Hibernian, before returning to Scotland two years later. Was named Ulster Footballer of the Year for 1965–66.
1967–1970	Ewan Fenton	Joined from Limerick, before returning to the club after his departure in 1970.
1969–1970	Dennis Viollet	The former Manchester United forward joined Linfield in 1969 as a player-coach, and picked up an Irish Cup winner's medal after the Blues won the 1969–70 final.
1970–1971	Billy Bingham	Managed Northern Ireland and Linfield simultaneously until leaving both posts in 1971. Would later return for a second spell as Northern Ireland manager in 1980.
1971–1972	Jimmy Hill	
1972–1973	Sammy Hatton	A member of the Linfield squad which famously won seven trophies in the 1961–62 season.
1973–1974	Billy Sinclair	
1974–1975	Billy Campbell	The club's eighth different manager in ten years.
1975–1990	Roy Coyle	Won a record-equalling six consecutive Irish League Championships. Most successful Linfield manager of all time alongside David Jeffrey with 31 major honours as manager.
1990–1992	Eric Bowyer	Won three league titles as a player at the club from 1967 to 1978, before joining Glenavon.
1992–1997	Trevor Anderson	Later became Director of Football at Newry Town.
1997–2014	David Jeffrey	Longest-serving manager in the club's history. Won 31 major honours as Linfield manager – a record shared with Roy Coyle. Would later manage Ballymena United.
2014–2015	Warren Feeney	Only the club's fifth different manager since 1975, and the shortest reign of any Linfield manager since then. Resigned in October 2015 to become assistant manager of Newport County.
2015–	David Healy	Only the club's sixth different manager since 1975. Former Northern Ireland international, and record goalscorer. Healy's first managerial position.

== Honours ==
=== Senior honours ===
- NIFL Premiership: 57
  - 1890–91, 1891–92, 1892–93, 1894–95, 1897–98, 1901–02, 1903–04, 1906–07, 1907–08, 1908–09, 1910–11, 1913–14, 1921–22, 1922–23, 1929–30, 1931–32, 1933–34, 1934–35, 1948–49, 1949–50, 1953–54, 1954–55, 1955–56, 1958–59, 1960–61, 1961–62, 1965–66, 1968–69, 1970–71, 1974–75, 1977–78, 1978–79, 1979–80, 1981–82, 1982–83, 1983–84, 1984–85, 1985–86, 1986–87, 1988–89, 1992–93, 1993–94, 1999–2000, 2000–01, 2003–04, 2005–06, 2006–07, 2007–08, 2009–10, 2010–11, 2011–12, 2016–17, 2018–19, 2019–20, 2020–21, 2021–22, 2024–25
- Irish Cup: 44
  - 1890–91, 1891–92, 1892–93, 1894–95, 1897–98, 1898–99, 1901–02, 1903–04, 1911–12, 1912–13, 1914–15, 1915–16, 1918–19, 1921–22, 1922–23, 1929–30, 1930–31, 1933–34, 1935–36, 1938–39, 1941–42, 1944–45, 1945–46, 1947–48, 1949–50, 1952–53, 1959–60, 1961–62, 1962–63, 1969–70, 1977–78, 1979–80, 1981–82, 1993–94, 1994–95, 2001–02, 2005–06, 2006–07, 2007–08, 2009–10, 2010–11, 2011–12, 2016–17, 2020–21
- Northern Ireland Football League Cup: 13
  - 1986–87, 1991–92, 1993–94, 1997–98, 1998–99, 1999–2000, 2001–02, 2005–06, 2007–08, 2018–19, 2022–23, 2023–24, 2025–26
- Charity Shield: 4
  - 1993 (shared), 1994, 2000, 2017
- County Antrim Shield: 43
  - 1898–99, 1903–04, 1905–06, 1906–07, 1907–08, 1912–13, 1913–14, 1916–17, 1921–22, 1922–23, 1927–28, 1928–29, 1929–30, 1931–32, 1932–33, 1933–34, 1934–35, 1937–38, 1941–42, 1946–47, 1952–53, 1954–55, 1957–58, 1958–59, 1960–61, 1961–62, 1962–63, 1965–66, 1966–67, 1972–73, 1976–77, 1980–81, 1981–82, 1982–83, 1983–84, 1994–95, 1997–98, 2000–01, 2003–04, 2004–05, 2005–06, 2013–14, 2016–17
- Gold Cup: 33
  - 1915–16, 1917–18, 1918–19, 1920–21, 1921–22, 1923–24, 1926–27, 1927–28, 1928–29, 1930–31, 1935–36, 1936–37, 1948–49, 1949–50, 1950–51, 1955–56, 1957–58, 1959–60, 1961–62, 1963–64, 1965–66, 1967–68, 1968–69, 1970–71, 1971–72, 1979–80, 1981–82, 1983–84, 1984–85, 1987–88, 1988–89, 1989–90, 1996–97
- City Cup: 24
  - 1894–95, 1895–96, 1897–98, 1899–1900, 1900–01, 1901–02, 1902–03, 1903–04, 1907–08, 1909–10, 1919–20, 1921–22, 1926–27, 1928–29, 1935–36, 1937–38, 1949–50, 1951–52, 1957–58, 1958–59, 1961–62, 1963–64, 1967–68, 1973–74
- Ulster Cup: 16
  - 1948–49, 1955–56, 1956–57, 1959–60, 1961–62, 1964–65, 1967–68, 1970–71, 1971–72, 1974–75, 1977–78, 1978–79, 1979–80, 1984–85, 1992–93, 2025–26
- Floodlit Cup: 2
  - 1993–94, 1997–98
- Top Four Cup: 2
  - 1966–67, 1967–68
- Belfast Charity Cup: 24
  - 1890–91, 1891–92, 1892–93, 1893–94, 1894–95, 1898–99, 1900–01, 1902–03, 1904–05, 1912–13, 1913–14, 1914–15, 1916–17, 1917–18, 1918–19, 1921–22, 1926–27, 1927–28, 1929–30, 1932–33, 1933–34, 1934–35, 1935–36 (shared), 1937–38
- Alhambra Cup: 1
  - 1921–22
- Jubilee Cup: 1
  - 1935–36
- Belfast & District League: 2 (Note: An unofficial league which ran for four seasons between 1915 and 1919. It was set up while the Irish League was suspended during World War I.)
  - 1915–16, 1917–18
- Belfast City Cup: 1 (Note: A temporary competition set up to replace the City Cup while it was suspended during World War I.)
  - 1917–18
- Northern Regional League: 3 (Note: An unofficial league which ran for seven seasons between 1940 and 1947. It was set up while the Irish League was suspended during World War II.)
  - 1942–43, 1944–45, 1945–46
- Substitute Gold Cup: 2 (Note: A temporary competition set up to replace the Gold Cup while it was suspended during World War II.)
  - 1942–43, 1944–45
- Manchester Charity Cup: 2
  - 1945–46, 1946–47

=== All-Ireland honours ===
- North-South Cup: 1
  - 1960–61 (Note: Linfield won the North-South Cup during the 1961–62 season, but it was actually the 1960–61 final. Due to fixture congestion the 1960–61 final was postponed until February 1962. Similarly, the 1961–62 competition was not completed until the 1962–63 season, and was won by Glenavon.)
- Blaxnit Cup: 1
  - 1970–71
- Tyler Cup: 1
  - 1980–81
- Setanta Cup: 1
  - 2005

=== Intermediate honours ===
Honours won by Linfield Swifts

- Irish Intermediate League: 2
  - 1939–40, 1945–46
- Irish League B Division: 3
  - 1951–52, 1952–53, 1975–76
- B Division Section 2/Reserve League/Development League: 22
  - 1977–78, 1978–79, 1979–80, 1982–83, 1983–84, 1984–85, 1987–88, 1988–89, 1990–91, 1991–92, 1998–99, 1999–2000, 2003–04, 2004–05, 2008–09, 2009–10, 2010–11, 2014–15, 2016–17, 2017–18, 2018–19, 2024-25
- County Antrim Shield: 1
  - 1948–49
- Irish Intermediate Cup: 11
  - 1896–97, 1898–99, 1900–01, 1928–29, 1945–46, 1948–49, 1955–56, 1956–57, 1971–72, 2001–02, 2003–04
- Steel & Sons Cup: 11
  - 1895–96, 1898–99, 1915–16, 1939–40, 1946–47, 1948–49, 1972–73, 1983–84, 1997–98, 2016–17, 2019–20
- George Wilson Cup: 10
  - 1953–54, 1961–62, 1976–77, 1980–81, 1983–84, 1984–85, 1988–89, 1998–99, 2008–09, 2010–11
- McElroy Cup: 5
  - 1928–29, 1937–38, 1939–40, 1944–45, 1945–46 (shared)

Honours won by Linfield Rangers

- Irish Intermediate Cup: 2
  - 1921–22, 1924–25

=== Junior honours ===
- Irish Junior League: 4
  - 1898–99‡, 1899–1900‡, 1900–01‡, 1903–04‡
- Irish Junior Cup: 3
  - 1890–91†, 1893–94‡, 1905–06ƒ
- County Antrim Junior Shield: 1
  - 1904–05ƒ
- Harry Cavan Youth Cup: 5
  - 2003–04¤, 2004–05¤, 2006–07¤, 2009–10¤, 2016–17
- Belfast Youth Cup:2
  - 2009–10¤, 2010–11¤
- Lisburn League Shield: 1
  - 2016–17¤
- IFA Youth Premier League: 4
  - 2005–06¤, 2006–07¤, 2008–09¤, 2012–13¤
- IFA Youth League Cup/NIFL Youth League Cup:5
  - 2008–09¤, 2012–13¤, 2013–14¤, 2014–15¤, 2015–16¤

† Won by Linfield II (reserve team)

‡ Won by Linfield Swifts (reserve team)

ƒ Won by Linfield Pirates (reserve team)

¤ Won by Linfield Rangers (reserve team)

== Records ==
=== Doubles and trebles ===
The club has achieved the double of winning the League title and the national cup in the same season on 25 occasions – more than any other club in the world. The club has also achieved the domestic treble of the League, national cup and League Cup in the same season on three occasions, and a domestic quadruple of those three trophies plus the regional County Antrim Shield in the same season once – in 2005–06. Most notably absent from the list are the seven-trophy hauls in the 1921–22 and 1961–62 seasons– achieved prior to the inauguration of the League Cup in 1987.

- Doubles:
  - League and Irish Cup: 25
    - 1890–91, 1891–92, 1892–93, 1894–95, 1897–98, 1901–02, 1903–04^{B}, 1921–22^{B}, 1922–23^{B}, 1929–30^{B}, 1933–34^{B}, 1949–50, 1961–62^{B}, 1977–78, 1979–80, 1981–82^{B}, 1993–94^{A}, 2005–06^{C}, 2006–07, 2007–08^{A}, 2009–10, 2010–11, 2011–12, 2016–17^{B}, 2020–21
  - League and League Cup: 6 (Note: Although the Irish Cup was inaugurated in 1881 and the Irish League was formed in 1890, the League Cup was not introduced until 1987.)
    - 1986–87, 1993–94^{A}, 1999–2000, 2005–06^{C}, 2007–08^{A}, 2018–19
- Trebles:
  - League, Irish Cup and League Cup: 3
    - 1993–94, 2005–06^{C}, 2007–08

^{A}As part of a domestic treble.
^{B}As part of a domestic treble (including the County Antrim Shield).
^{C}As part of a domestic quadruple (including the County Antrim Shield).

== See also ==
- Linfield F.C. Women
