= 2022–23 NIFL Premiership =

NIFL Premiership
- Season: 2022–23
- Dates: 12 Aug 2022 – 29 Apr 2023
- Champions: Larne
- Relegated: Portadown
- UEFA Champions League: Larne
- UEFA Europa Conference League: Linfield; Crusaders (via Irish Cup); Glentoran (via Play-offs)
- Matches: 228
- Goals: 647 (2.84 per match)
- Top goalscorer: Matthew Shevlin (21 goals)
- Biggest home win: Linfield 7–0 Newry City (18 March 2023)
- Biggest away win: Portadown 1–6 Linfield (28 January 2023)
- Highest scoring: Carrick Rangers 4–3 Crusaders (1 October 2022)
- Highest attendance: 7,134 Linfield 0–3 Glentoran (14 October 2022)
- Lowest attendance: 274 Carrick Rangers 3–0 Dungannon Swifts (15 October 2022)
- All statistics correct as of 11 March 2023.

The 2022–23 NIFL Premiership (known as the Danske Bank Premiership for sponsorship reasons) was the 15th season of the NIFL Premiership, the highest level of league football in Northern Ireland, the 122nd season of Irish League football overall, and the 10th season of the league operating as part of the Northern Ireland Football League.

Larne were champions, winning the Irish League for the first time. They became the 13th different club to win the league since 1890, and the first addition to the list of title-winners since Coleraine in 1974.

== Summary ==
The 38-game season commenced on 12 August 2022 and concluded on 29 April 2023.

Linfield were the four-time defending champions, having been league winners in the previous four seasons - the 2021–22 season seeing them win a world record 56th league crown.

Larne became the champions and entered the 2023–24 UEFA Champions League first qualifying round, clinching their first league title on 14 April 2023 with a 2–0 win over Crusaders. The runners-up (Linfield), the Irish Cup winners (Crusaders), and the play-off winners (Glentoran) entered the 2023–24 UEFA Europa Conference League first qualifying round.

== Teams ==
Locations of the 2022–23 NIFL Irish Premiership teams
Locations of the Belfast-based 2022–23 NIFL Irish Premiership teams

Twelve teams competed in this season's Premiership, eleven of which returned from the previous season. Warrenpoint Town finished bottom of the table the previous season, and were relegated to the NIFL Championship after five years as a Premiership club, with Championship winners Newry City promoted to replace them for this season's Premiership. 11th-placed Portadown retained their Premiership status after defeating Annagh United 4–2 on aggregate in the Premiership play-off.

=== Stadia and locations ===
| Club | Stadium | Location | Capacity |
|---|---|---|---|
| Ballymena United | The Showgrounds | Ballymena | 3,824 (all seated) |
| Carrick Rangers | Loughshore Hotel Arena | Carrickfergus | 2,100 (380 seated) |
| Cliftonville | Solitude | Belfast | 3,054 (all seated) |
| Coleraine | The Showgrounds | Coleraine | 4,843 (1,607 seated) |
| Crusaders | Seaview | Belfast | 3,208 (all seated) |
| Dungannon Swifts | Stangmore Park | Dungannon | 2,000 (300 seated) |
| Glenavon | Mourneview Park | Lurgan | 3,302 (all seated) |
| Glentoran | The Oval | Belfast | 6,054 (3,991 seated) |
| Larne | Inver Park | Larne | 2,732 (1,632 seated) |
| Linfield | Windsor Park | Belfast | 18,434 (all seated) |
| Newry City | The Showgrounds | Newry | 2,275 (1,080 seated) |
| Portadown | Shamrock Park | Portadown | 3,940 (2,765 seated) |

== League table ==
| Pos | Team | Pld | W | D | L | GF | GA | GD | Pts | Qualification or relegation (Note: Teams play each other three times (33 matches), before the league is split into two groups (the top six and the bottom six).) |
|---|---|---|---|---|---|---|---|---|---|---|
| 1 | Larne (C) | 38 | 25 | 8 | 5 | 64 | 22 | +42 | 83 | Qualification for the Champions League first qualifying round |
| 2 | Linfield | 38 | 23 | 8 | 7 | 75 | 27 | +48 | 77 | Qualification for the Europa Conference League first qualifying round |
| 3 | Glentoran (O) | 38 | 23 | 5 | 10 | 77 | 28 | +49 | 74 | Qualification for the Europa Conference League play-offs (Note: Glentoran entered the Europa Conference League first qualifying round as play-off winners.) |
| 4 | Cliftonville | 38 | 20 | 8 | 10 | 66 | 53 | +13 | 68 | Qualification for the Europa Conference League play-offs |
| 5 | Crusaders | 38 | 19 | 10 | 9 | 72 | 45 | +27 | 67 | Qualification for the Europa Conference League first qualifying round (Note: Crusaders entered the Europa Conference League first qualifying round as 2022–23 Irish Cup winners.) |
| 6 | Coleraine | 38 | 18 | 8 | 12 | 59 | 39 | +20 | 62 | Qualification for the Europa Conference League play-offs |
| 7 | Glenavon | 38 | 14 | 10 | 14 | 58 | 61 | −3 | 52 | Qualification for the Europa Conference League play-offs |
| 8 | Carrick Rangers | 38 | 12 | 4 | 22 | 45 | 74 | −29 | 40 | |
| 9 | Ballymena United | 38 | 11 | 6 | 21 | 37 | 55 | −18 | 39 | |
| 10 | Newry City | 38 | 9 | 3 | 26 | 37 | 71 | −34 | 30 | |
| 11 | Dungannon Swifts (O) | 38 | 9 | 3 | 26 | 28 | 84 | −56 | 30 | Qualification for the NIFL Premiership play-off |
| 12 | Portadown (R) | 38 | 6 | 5 | 27 | 29 | 88 | −59 | 23 | Relegation to the NIFL Championship |

Source: Northern Ireland Football League, Soccerway
Rules for classification: 1) Points; 2) Goal difference; 3) Number of goals scored; 4) Head-to-head points; 5) Head-to-head goal difference; 6) Drawing of lots
(C) Champions; (O) Play-off winners; (R) Relegated

== Results ==
=== Matches 1–22 ===
During matches 1–22 each team plays every other team twice (home and away).

| Home \ Away | BYM | CRK | CLF | COL | CRU | DUN | GLA | GLT | LAR | LIN | NEW | POR |
|---|---|---|---|---|---|---|---|---|---|---|---|---|
| Ballymena United | — | 0–1 | 1–2 | 2–1 | 0–0 | 2–0 | 2–2 | 2–0 | 0–3 | 0–4 | 3–0 | 2–0 |
| Carrick Rangers | 0–2 | — | 3–3 | 2–4 | 4–3 | 3–0 | 1–1 | 1–5 | 0–1 | 2–1 | 2–1 | 2–0 |
| Cliftonville | 4–0 | 3–2 | — | 2–2 | 0–0 | 4–2 | 2–2 | 1–0 | 2–1 | 1–0 | 4–0 | 4–1 |
| Coleraine | 2–0 | 1–0 | 3–1 | — | 1–2 | 2–0 | 1–3 | 0–0 | 0–0 | 0–0 | 2–0 | 4–0 |
| Crusaders | 3–0 | 3–0 | 3–0 | 2–0 | — | 5–1 | 3–2 | 3–2 | 1–1 | 2–1 | 4–0 | 2–1 |
| Dungannon Swifts | 0–2 | 4–1 | 0–2 | 0–5 | 0–2 | — | 1–0 | 0–1 | 0–3 | 0–1 | 2–0 | 2–0 |
| Glenavon | 3–2 | 2–2 | 0–1 | 0–0 | 4–2 | 5–0 | — | 2–1 | 1–2 | 1–6 | 1–5 | 2–1 |
| Glentoran | 1–0 | 5–0 | 0–1 | 1–0 | 3–1 | 3–1 | 0–0 | — | 4–0 | 1–2 | 3–0 | 5–1 |
| Larne | 3–0 | 0–0 | 4–0 | 2–0 | 4–1 | 4–0 | 3–0 | 0–0 | — | 0–0 | 2–0 | 2–0 |
| Linfield | 3–0 | 3–1 | 0–0 | 0–0 | 0–0 | 4–0 | 3–2 | 0–3 | 2–4 | — | 7–0 | 4–0 |
| Newry City | 3–2 | 4–1 | 1–2 | 1–2 | 1–2 | 1–0 | 0–1 | 0–1 | 0–2 | 0–2 | — | 3–0 (Note: Originally a 1–3 win for Portadown; Newry City awarded a 3–0 win after Portadown fielded an ineligible player.) |
| Portadown | 1–0 | 1–3 | 1–2 | 0–2 | 2–2 | 0–0 | 1–1 | 0–3 | 0–1 | 0–3 | 1–3 | — |

Source: Northern Ireland Football League, Soccerway
Legend: Blue = home team win; Yellow = draw; Red = away team win.
For upcoming matches, an "a" indicates there is an article about the rivalry between the two participants.

=== Matches 23–33 ===
During matches 23–33 each team plays every other team for the third time (either at home or away).

| Home \ Away | BYM | CRK | CLF | COL | CRU | DUN | GLA | GLT | LAR | LIN | NEW | POR |
|---|---|---|---|---|---|---|---|---|---|---|---|---|
| Ballymena United | — | — | 4–1 | — | — | — | 0–1 | 1–3 | — | 0–2 | 0–0 | 0–0 |
| Carrick Rangers | 1–0 | — | — | 0–1 | 0–3 | — | — | 0–4 | 2–3 | — | — | 2–0 |
| Cliftonville | — | 1–0 | — | — | — | 1–2 | — | 2–1 | — | — | 2–0 | 3–0 |
| Coleraine | 3–1 | — | 2–4 | — | 2–0 | — | — | 2–2 | — | — | 1–0 | 4–1 |
| Crusaders | 0–1 | — | 2–2 | — | — | 3–0 | — | — | — | 2–0 | 3–1 | 4–0 |
| Dungannon Swifts | 1–1 | 0–1 | — | 0–3 | — | — | 2–1 | — | — | 0–5 | — | — |
| Glenavon | — | 4–2 | 1–3 | 2–1 | 2–2 | — | — | — | 0–1 | — | 0–2 | — |
| Glentoran | — | — | — | — | 2–0 | 6–0 | 0–2 | — | 0–1 | 3–0 | — | — |
| Larne | 1–0 | — | 2–1 | 0–2 | 0–0 | 2–1 | — | — | — | — | — | — |
| Linfield | — | 2–0 | 1–0 | 2–0 | — | — | 2–1 | — | 1–0 | — | — | — |
| Newry City | — | 0–2 | — | — | — | 0–2 | — | 1–3 | 0–0 | 1–3 | — | 3–4 |
| Portadown | — | — | — | — | — | 3–1 | 3–1 | 0–2 | 0–5 | 1–6 | — | — |

Source: Northern Ireland Football League
Legend: Blue = home team win; Yellow = draw; Red = away team win.
For upcoming matches, an "a" indicates there is an article about the rivalry between the two participants.

=== Matches 34–38 ===
For the final five matches, the table splits into two halves, with the top six teams forming Section A and the bottom six teams forming Section B. Each team plays every other team in their respective section once. The fixtures are reversed from those played during rounds 23–33, ensuring that teams have played every other team in their respective section twice at home and twice away overall throughout the season.

==== Section A ====
| Home \ Away | CLF | COL | CRU | GLT | LAR | LIN |
|---|---|---|---|---|---|---|
| Cliftonville | — | 2–2 | 3–3 | — | 0–2 | 0–2 |
| Coleraine | — | — | — | — | 3–0 | 0–1 |
| Crusaders | — | 3–1 | — | 1–2 | 0–2 | — |
| Glentoran | 3–0 | 3–0 | — | — | — | — |
| Larne | — | — | — | 2–0 | — | 1–1 |
| Linfield | — | — | 0–0 | 1–1 | — | — |

Source: Northern Ireland Football League
Legend: Blue = home team win; Yellow = draw; Red = away team win.
For upcoming matches, an "a" indicates there is an article about the rivalry between the two participants.

==== Section B ====
| Home \ Away | BYM | CRK | DUN | GLA | NEW | POR |
|---|---|---|---|---|---|---|
| Ballymena United | — | 1–0 | 2–0 | — | — | — |
| Carrick Rangers | — | — | 2–0 | 1–3 | 0–2 | — |
| Dungannon Swifts | — | — | — | — | 2–1 | 3–2 |
| Glenavon | 3–2 | — | 1–1 | — | — | 0–0 |
| Newry City | 2–2 | — | — | 0–1 | — | — |
| Portadown | 1–0 | 3–1 | — | — | 0–1 | — |

Source: Northern Ireland Football League
Legend: Blue = home team win; Yellow = draw; Red = away team win.
For upcoming matches, an "a" indicates there is an article about the rivalry between the two participants.

== Play-offs ==
=== UEFA Europa Conference League play-offs ===
Four or five of the clubs that finish in 3rd–7th place compete for one place in the 2023–24 Europa Conference League first qualifying round. The play-offs are one-off matches with extra time and penalties used to determine the winner if necessary, with the higher-ranked teams given home advantage against the lower-ranked teams (i.e. 3rd v. 7th and 5th v. 6th) in the semi-finals. The higher-ranked of the two semi-final winners also gains home advantage in the final.

=== Semi-finals ===
| 10 May 2023 | Cliftonville | 2–1 | Coleraine | Solitude |
| 19:45 BST (UTC+01) | Curran 4'; Doherty 20' | | Shevlin 72' |

| 10 May 2023 | Glentoran | 5–0 | Glenavon | The Oval |
| 19:45 BST (UTC+01) | McCullough 3'; McMenamin 35'; Garrett 53' (o.g.); J. Donnelly 73'; R. Donnelly 78' |

=== Final ===
| 13 May 2023 | Glentoran | 2–0 | Cliftonville | The Oval |
| 16:30 BST (UTC+01) | Ogedi-Uzokwe 35' (pen.), 40' |

=== NIFL Premiership play-off ===
The eleventh-placed club (Dungannon Swifts) were expected to face the second-placed club from the 2022–23 NIFL Championship (Warrenpoint Town) for one place in the following season's Premiership. However, Warrenpoint Town were denied an NIFL Premiership license on 27 April 2023 and were unsuccessful in their appeal, resulting in the play-off being postponed. Eventually, the third-placed club from the NIFL Championship at the time (Annagh United) elected to take Warrenpoint Town's place in the play-off.

=== First leg ===
| 30 May 2023 | Annagh United | 2–1 | Dungannon Swifts | BMG Arena |
| 19:45 BST (UTC+01) | Ruddy 4' (o.g.); Taylor 70' | | Animasahun 3' |

=== Second leg ===
| 1 June 2023 | Dungannon Swifts | 2–0 (3–2 agg.) | Annagh United | Stangmore Park |
| 19:45 BST (UTC+01) | McGee 13'; O'Connor 69' |

== Statistics ==
=== Top goalscorers ===
| Rank | Scorer | Club | Goals |
|---|---|---|---|
| 1 | (Northern Ireland) Matthew Shevlin | Coleraine | 23 |
| 2 | (Northern Ireland) Matthew Fitzpatrick | Glenavon | 19 |
| 3 | (Republic of Ireland) Ronan Hale | Cliftonville | 18 |
| 5 | (Finland) Eetu Vertainen | Linfield | 17 |
| 5 | (Northern Ireland) Philip Lowry | Crusaders | 17 |
| 6 | (Northern Ireland) Lee Bonis | Larne | 15 |
| 7 | (Northern Ireland) Ryan Curran | Cliftonville | 14 |
| 8 | (Northern Ireland) Paul O'Neill | Larne | 13 |
| 10 | (Northern Ireland) Jay Donnelly | Glentoran | 12 |
| 10 | (Northern Ireland) Joel Cooper | Linfield | 12 |

=== Clean sheets ===
| Rank | Goalkeeper | Club | Clean sheets |
|---|---|---|---|
| 1 | (Scotland) Rohan Ferguson | Larne | 23 |
| 2 | (Northern Ireland) Chris Johns | Linfield | 21 |
| 3 | (Republic of Ireland) Aaron McCarey | Glentoran | 17 |
| 4 | (Northern Ireland) Jonathan Tuffey | Crusaders | 14 |
| 6 | (Northern Ireland) Nathan Gartside | Cliftonville | 12 |
| 6 | (Northern Ireland) Gareth Deane | Coleraine | 12 |
| 7 | (Northern Ireland) Ross Glendinning | Carrick Rangers | 9 |
| 8 | (Northern Ireland) Sean O'Neill | Ballymena United | 8 |
| 9 | (Northern Ireland) Rory Brown | Glenavon | 7 |
| 10 | (Northern Ireland) Martin Gallagher | Coleraine | 6 |

== Attendances ==
| # | Football club | Home games | Average attendance |
|---|---|---|---|
| 1 | Glentoran | 19 | 2,969 |
| 2 | Linfield | 19 | 2,959 |
| 3 | Coleraine | 19 | 2,748 |
| 4 | Larne | 19 | 1,988 |
| 5 | Cliftonville | 19 | 1,851 |
| 6 | Crusaders | 19 | 1,607 |
| 7 | Ballymena United | 19 | 1,258 |
| 8 | Portadown | 19 | 946 |
| 9 | Glenavon | 19 | 809 |
| 10 | Newry City | 19 | 748 |
| 11 | Dungannon Swifts | 19 | 682 |
| 12 | Carrick Rangers | 19 | 624 |
