= 2021–22 NIFL Premiership =

NIFL Premiership
- Season: 2021–22
- Dates: 27 Aug 2021 – 30 Apr 2022
- Champions: Linfield; 8th Premiership title 56th Irish title
- Relegated: Warrenpoint Town
- UEFA Champions League: Linfield
- UEFA Europa Conference League: Crusaders (via Irish Cup); Cliftonville; Larne (via play-offs)
- Matches: 228
- Goals: 623 (2.73 per match)
- Top goalscorer: Jay Donnelly (25 goals)
- Biggest home win: Linfield 5–0 Dungannon Swifts (19 March 2022)
- Biggest away win: Warrenpoint Town 1–6 Glenavon (4 September 2021); Dungannon Swifts 0–5 Coleraine (11 September 2021); Dungannon Swifts 1–6 Linfield (1 January 2022); Portadown 0–5 Carrick Rangers (30 April 2022)
- Highest scoring: Glentoran 6–2 Carrick Rangers (28 March 2022)
- Highest attendance: 8,007; Linfield 1–1 Glentoran (27 December 2021)
- Lowest attendance: 98; Carrick Rangers 1–2 Dungannon Swifts (4 December 2021)
- Total attendance: 328,529
- Average attendance: 1,441

The 2021–22 NIFL Premiership (known as the Danske Bank Premiership for sponsorship reasons) was the 14th season of the NIFL Premiership, the highest level of league football in Northern Ireland, the 121st season of Irish League football overall, and the 9th season of the league operating as part of the Northern Ireland Football League.

Linfield were champions, winning the league for the 56th time and the 4th consecutive season. The season was due to begin in early August, however, due to the previous season finishing a few weeks later than usual in late May 2021 as a result of the COVID-19 pandemic in Northern Ireland, the start of this season was pushed back.

== Summary ==
The 38-game season commenced on 27 August 2021 and concluded on 30 April 2022, with the play-offs taking place during the first two weeks in May 2022.

Linfield were the three-time defending champions, having been league winners in the previous three seasons - the 2020–21 season seeing them win a then world record-equalling 55th league title. This season Linfield once again retained their title, securing a world record 56th league crown on the final day of the season. A 2–0 win over Coleraine meant that the Blues pipped runners-up Cliftonville to the title by a single point. This was the first time in 35 years that a club had won four consecutive titles, with Linfield winning the last of their six consecutive titles in the 1986–87 season. It was also the narrowest title-winning margin since the 2008–09 season, when Glentoran won the title by a single point ahead of Linfield. At the bottom end of the table, Warrenpoint Town were relegated to the NIFL Championship after five years as a Premiership club, with Championship winners Newry City promoted to replace them for the following season. Portadown retained their Premiership status after defeating Annagh United 4–2 on aggregate in the Premiership play-off.

League winners Linfield entered the 2022–23 UEFA Champions League first qualifying round, while Larne (play-off winners) and Crusaders (Irish Cup winners) joined Cliftonville (league runners-up) in the 2022–23 UEFA Europa Conference League first qualifying round.

== Teams ==
Locations of the 2021–22 NIFL Premiership teams
Locations of the Belfast-based 2021–22 NIFL Premiership teams

Twelve teams competed in the 2021–22 NIFL Premiership, the same twelve teams from the previous season. No relegation took place from the previous season's Premiership, after a majority of second-tier NIFL Championship clubs voted to cancel their 2020–21 season. The second and third tiers had not been granted 'elite' sporting status by the IFA which was required in order to continue playing matches during the COVID-19 pandemic lockdown, with lower division clubs not having played any league fixtures since the 2019–20 season had initially been suspended in March 2020.

Dungannon Swifts finished bottom of the table the previous season, but were reprieved from relegation. Carrick Rangers were also reprieved, having finished in 11th place. This would normally have required them to take part in the NIFL Premiership play-off against the qualifier from the NIFL Championship.

=== Stadia and locations ===
Club	Stadium	Location	Capacity
Ballymena United	The Showgrounds	Ballymena	3,824 (all seated)
Carrick Rangers	Loughshore Hotel Arena	Carrickfergus	2,100 (380 seated)
Cliftonville	Solitude	Belfast	3,054 (all seated)
Coleraine	The Showgrounds	Coleraine	4,843 (1,607 seated)
Crusaders	Seaview	Belfast	3,208 (all seated)
Dungannon Swifts	Stangmore Park	Dungannon	2,000 (300 seated)
Glenavon	Mourneview Park	Lurgan	3,302 (all seated)
Glentoran	The Oval	Belfast	6,054 (3,991 seated)
Larne	Inver Park	Larne	2,732 (1,632 seated)
Linfield	Windsor Park	Belfast	18,434 (all seated)
Portadown	Shamrock Park	Portadown	3,940 (2,765 seated)
Warrenpoint Town	Milltown	Warrenpoint	2,000 (150 seated)

== League table ==
Pos	Team	Pld	W	D	L	GF	GA	GD	Pts	Qualification or relegation (Note: Teams played each other three times (33 matches), before the league split into two groups (the top six and the bottom six) for the last five matches.)
1	Linfield (C)	38	24	11	3	67	24	+43	83	Qualification for the Champions League first qualifying round
2	Cliftonville	38	24	10	4	61	29	+32	82	Qualification for the Europa Conference League first qualifying round
3	Glentoran	38	21	8	9	68	44	+24	71	Qualification for the Europa Conference League play-offs (Note: Larne entered the Europa Conference League first qualifying round as play-off winners.)
4	Crusaders	38	21	5	12	60	36	+24	68	Qualification for the Europa Conference League first qualifying round (Note: Crusaders entered the Europa Conference League first qualifying round as 2021–22 Irish Cup winners.)
5	Larne (O)	38	17	11	10	61	39	+22	62	Qualification for the Europa Conference League play-offs
6	Coleraine	38	14	9	15	55	45	+10	51	Qualification for the Europa Conference League play-offs
7	Glenavon	38	15	9	14	54	50	+4	54	Qualification for the Europa Conference League play-offs
8	Ballymena United	38	16	5	17	46	52	−6	53	
9	Dungannon Swifts	38	11	2	25	46	86	−40	35	
10	Carrick Rangers	38	9	7	22	41	67	−26	34	
11	Portadown (O)	38	5	10	23	29	72	−43	25	Qualification for the NIFL Premiership play-off
12	Warrenpoint Town (R)	38	6	3	29	35	79	−44	21	Relegation to the NIFL Championship

Source: Northern Ireland Football League
Rules for classification: 1) Points; 2) Goal difference; 3) Number of goals scored; 4) Head-to-head points; 5) Head-to-head goal difference; 6) Drawing of lots
(C) Champions; (O) Play-off winners; (R) Relegated

== Results ==
=== Matches 1–22 ===
During matches 1–22 each team played every other team twice (home and away).

Home \ Away	BYM	CRK	CLF	COL	CRU	DUN	GLA	GLT	LAR	LIN	POR	WPT
Ballymena United	—	0–1	1–0	2–1	0–1	4–3	1–1	1–1	0–3	0–2	4–0	1–0
Carrick Rangers	2–1	—	2–3	0–3	0–2	1–2	2–2	0–2	1–3	1–2	1–0	1–0
Cliftonville	1–0	2–1	—	2–1	0–2	3–0	2–1	1–0	2–1	2–2	4–0	1–0
Coleraine	3–0	3–0	0–0	—	0–0	2–0	0–0	0–2	3–1	1–2	2–0	2–0
Crusaders	2–1	0–0	1–1	0–2	—	4–0	0–1	0–1	1–0	2–1	4–0	2–1
Dungannon Swifts	0–2	2–0	1–3	0–5	0–2	—	0–2	2–3	2–4	1–6	4–2	2–2
Glenavon	0–1	0–4	0–2	1–0	1–0	4–2	—	1–2	0–1	0–0	3–0	2–2
Glentoran	4–1	6–2	0–1	2–2	0–3	3–0	2–0	—	2–3	0–3	2–2	2–1
Larne	1–3	0–0	1–1	4–2	1–0	0–1	3–2	1–1	—	1–1	4–0	3–0
Linfield	1–0	4–0	1–1	1–1	2–0	3–0	2–0	1–1	2–1	—	1–0	1–1
Portadown	0–1	2–2	1–1	0–0	0–1	1–4	1–1	1–1	2–3	2–3	—	1–0
Warrenpoint Town	2–1	4–2	2–4	2–5	2–4	1–2	1–6	0–3	0–3	0–3	2–3	—

Source: Northern Ireland Football League
Legend: Blue = home team win; Yellow = draw; Red = away team win.
For upcoming matches, an "a" indicates there is an article about the rivalry between the two participants.

=== Matches 23–33 ===
During matches 23–33 each team played every other team for the third time (either at home, or away).

Home \ Away	BYM	CRK	CLF	COL	CRU	DUN	GLA	GLT	LAR	LIN	POR	WPT
Ballymena United	—	—	2–2	—	2–0	1–0	3–3	—	2–1	—	—	—
Carrick Rangers	3–0	—	—	0–0	—	—	—	0–3	1–1	—	2–2	1–2
Cliftonville	—	2–0	—	2–0	3–1	—	—	1–2	—	—	—	1–0
Coleraine	1–1	—	—	—	—	2–0	2–3	—	1–1	3–0	—	2–1
Crusaders	—	2–1	—	1–0	—	—	0–0	1–2	—	—	2–0	—
Dungannon Swifts	—	3–2	0–1	—	2–4	—	—	0–1	0–2	—	3–1	—
Glenavon	—	2–0	0–2	—	—	3–1	—	2–4	—	0–3	—	—
Glentoran	4–0	—	—	2–1	—	—	—	—	—	1–0	3–1	1–0
Larne	—	—	0–1	—	1–2	—	1–1	2–1	—	0–1	—	3–0
Linfield	1–0	2–0	1–0	—	3–2	5–0	—	—	—	—	—	—
Portadown	1–0	—	0–2	2–0	—	—	0–1	—	2–2	0–0	—	—
Warrenpoint Town	1–2	—	—	—	0–1	2–3	0–3	—	—	1–2	0–1	—

Source: Northern Ireland Football League
Legend: Blue = home team win; Yellow = draw; Red = away team win.
For upcoming matches, an "a" indicates there is an article about the rivalry between the two participants.

=== Matches 34–38 ===
For the final five matches the table was then split into two halves, with teams ranked 1st–6th in Section A and teams ranked 7th–12th in Section B. During matches 34–38 each team played every other team in their respective section once. The fixtures were reversed from those played during rounds 23–33, ensuring that teams had played every other team in their respective section twice at home and twice away overall throughout the season.

==== Section A ====
Home \ Away	CLF	COL	CRU	GLT	LAR	LIN
Cliftonville	—	—	—	—	0–0	0–0
Coleraine	1–2	—	1–4	3–2	—	—
Crusaders	3–3	—	—	—	1–2	1–2
Glentoran	1–2	—	0–4	—	0–0	—
Larne	—	3–0	—	—	—	—
Linfield	—	2–0	—	1–1	0–0	—

Source: Northern Ireland Football League
Legend: Blue = home team win; Yellow = draw; Red = away team win.
For upcoming matches, an "a" indicates there is an article about the rivalry between the two participants.

==== Section B ====
Home \ Away	BYM	CRK	DUN	GLA	POR	WPT
Ballymena United	—	3–0	—	—	2–1	0–1
Carrick Rangers	—	—	1–0	0–1	—	—
Dungannon Swifts	1–2	—	—	3–2	—	2–0
Glenavon	3–1	—	—	—	1–0	1–2
Portadown	—	0–5	0–0	—	—	0–1
Warrenpoint Town	—	1–2	—	—	—	—

Source: Northern Ireland Football League
Legend: Blue = home team win; Yellow = draw; Red = away team win.
For upcoming matches, an "a" indicates there is an article about the rivalry between the two participants.

== Play-offs ==
=== UEFA Europa Conference League play-offs ===
Four of the clubs that finished in 3rd–7th place competed for one place in the 2022–23 Europa Conference League first qualifying round, with 4th-placed Crusaders vacating their play-off place as they qualified for Europe directly by winning the Irish Cup. The play-offs were one-off matches with extra time and penalties used to determine the winner if necessary, with the higher-ranked teams given home advantage against the lower-ranked teams (i.e. 3rd v. 7th and 5th v. 6th) in the semi-finals. The higher-ranked of the two semi-final winners also had home advantage in the final.

==== Semi-finals ====
10 May 2022
19:45 BST
Semi-final

Glentoran (3rd)	2–0	Glenavon (7th)
McMenamin 48'; Donnelly 72'	NIFL

The Oval, Belfast
Referee: Lee Tavinder

10 May 2022
19:45 BST
Semi-final

Larne (5th)	2–0	Coleraine (6th)
Brown 12' (o.g.); Randall 90+5'	NIFL

Inver Park, Larne
Referee: Ross Dunlop

==== Final ====
13 May 2022
19:45 BST
Final

Glentoran (3rd)	2–4 (a.e.t.)	Larne (5th)
McMenamin 9'; Donnelly 51'	NIFL	Hale 75', 84' (pen.), 100', 120+1'

The Oval, Belfast
Referee: Raymond Crangle

=== NIFL Premiership play-off ===
The eleventh-placed club, Portadown, faced the second-placed club from the 2021–22 NIFL Championship, Annagh United, for one place in the following season's Premiership.

3 May 2022
19:45 BST
First leg

Annagh United	2–3	Portadown
Upton 22'; Murray 27'	NIFL	Beverland 13'; Teggart 71'; Stedman 73'

BMG Arena, Portadown

6 May 2022
19:45 BST
Second leg

Portadown	1–0	Annagh United
Upton 88' (o.g.)	NIFL

Shamrock Park, Portadown

Portadown won 4–2 on aggregate.

== Statistics ==
=== Top goalscorers ===
Rank	Scorer	Club	Goals
1	(Northern Ireland) Jay Donnelly	Glentoran	26
2	(Northern Ireland) Conor McMenamin	Glentoran	20
3	(Northern Ireland) Ryan Curran	Cliftonville	19
4	(Democratic Republic of the Congo) Christy Manzinga	Linfield	17
5	(Northern Ireland) Matthew Fitzpatrick	Glenavon	13
5	(Northern Ireland) Joe Gormley	Cliftonville	13
5	(Northern Ireland) Matthew Shevlin	Coleraine	13
8	(Northern Ireland) Peter Campbell	Glenavon	11
8	(Northern Ireland) Ben Kennedy	Crusaders	11
8	(Northern Ireland) David McDaid	Larne	11
