= 2013–14 NIFL Premiership =

NIFL Premiership
- Season: 2013–14
- Champions: Cliftonville; 2nd Premiership title 5th Irish title
- Relegated: Ards
- Champions League: Cliftonville
- Europa League: Glenavon (via Irish Cup); Linfield; Crusaders
- Matches played: 228
- Goals scored: 712 (3.12 per match)
- Top goalscorer: Joe Gormley (27 goals)
- Biggest home win: Portadown 11–0 Ballinamallard United (7 September 2013)
- Biggest away win: Dungannon Swifts 0–5 Portadown (26 October 2013)
- Highest scoring: Portadown 11–0 Ballinamallard United (7 September 2013)
- Highest attendance: 5,389; Glentoran 1–2 Linfield (26 December 2013)
- Lowest attendance: 63; Warrenpoint Town 0–2 Ards (8 March 2014)
- Average attendance: 867

The 2013–14 NIFL Premiership (known as the Danske Bank Premiership for sponsorship reasons) was the 6th season of the NIFL Premiership, the highest level of league football in Northern Ireland, the 113th season of Irish league football overall, and the 1st season of the league operating as part of the newly created Northern Ireland Football League.

Cliftonville were champions, winning the league for the 5th time and the 2nd consecutive season.

== Summary ==
The season began on 10 August 2013 and concluded on 26 April 2014. During the sixth round of fixtures, which were played on 7 September 2013, Portadown defeated Ballinamallard United 11–0 at Shamrock Park. This equalled the post-war record for the biggest win in the top-flight, which was set 47 years earlier in the 1966–67 season when Distillery defeated Bangor by the same scoreline in November 1966. In their first season back in the top flight since 2005–06, Ards finished bottom of the table. This was confirmed on 12 April 2014, after Warrenpoint Town defeated Dungannon Swifts 4–0 to leave Ards 10 points adrift in 12th place with only three fixtures remaining. Their relegation was confirmed on the final day of the season, when Institute won the 2013–14 NIFL Championship 1 title.

Cliftonville were the defending champions after winning their fourth league title last season – their first since the 1997–98 season. They went on to retain the title for the first time in the club's history - their fourth outright league title and fifth overall. They were entered into the second qualifying round of the 2014–15 UEFA Champions League, with the league runners-up Linfield, 3rd-placed Crusaders, and the 2013–14 Irish Cup winners, Glenavon, entered into the first qualifying round of the 2014–15 UEFA Europa League.

== Teams ==
After successfully gaining the required Championship Club Licence from the IFA, 2012–13 Championship 1 winners Ards were promoted to this season's Premiership. The club returned to the top flight for the first time since they were relegated in the 2005–06 season. After 11 years in the top flight, last season's bottom-placed Premiership club Lisburn Distillery were relegated to intermediate football for the first time in their history, bringing to an end their record of being one of only four clubs to have retained membership of the senior Irish League since its inception in 1890.

The runners-up of Championship 1, Warrenpoint Town, faced last season's 11th-placed club Donegal Celtic in the promotion/relegation play-off to decide which club would take the final place in this season's Premiership. The tie ended 2–2 on aggregate, with Warrenpoint Town winning on the away goals rule to secure promotion to the top flight of national football for the first time in their history – the club's third promotion in four years.

=== Stadia and locations ===
Location of teams in the 2013–14 NIFL Premiership
Location of the Belfast-based teams in the 2013–14 NIFL Premiership

Club	Stadium	Location	Capacity
Ards	Clandeboye Park	Bangor	2,000 (500 seated)
Ards	Dixon Park	Ballyclare	2,000 (500 seated)
Ballinamallard United	Ferney Park	Ballinamallard	2,000 (250 seated)
Ballymena United	The Showgrounds	Ballymena	3,050 (2,200 seated)
Cliftonville	Solitude	Belfast	2,530 (all seated)
Coleraine	The Showgrounds	Coleraine	2,496 (1,106 seated)
Crusaders	Seaview	Belfast	3,383 (all seated)
Dungannon Swifts	Stangmore Park	Dungannon	5,000 (300 seated)
Glenavon	Mourneview Park	Lurgan	4,160 (4,000 seated)
Glentoran	The Oval	Belfast	5,056 (3,991 seated)
Linfield	Windsor Park	Belfast	12,342 (all seated)
Portadown	Shamrock Park	Portadown	3,940 (2,765 seated)
Warrenpoint Town	Milltown	Warrenpoint	2,000 (250 seated)
Warrenpoint Town	Stangmore Park	Dungannon	5,000 (300 seated)

=== Ground-sharing ===
Ards nominated Bangor's home ground, Clandeboye Park, as the venue for their home games as they had been without a home ground since 2002. However, as a result of construction work being carried out to the ground, their first four home matches of the season were played at Dixon Park – the home of Championship side Ballyclare Comrades. The other newly promoted side, Warrenpoint Town, played some of their home fixtures at Dungannon Swifts' ground, Stangmore Park. This was due to improvements being carried out at their own ground, Milltown, in order to upgrade it to Premiership standard. However, the first ever Premiership game to be played at the ground, which was against Glenavon, was abandoned during half-time due to floodlight failure. The first completed fixture at the ground was a 2–0 win over Ards on 26 December 2013. That match also experienced floodlight problems, delaying kick-off for the second half by 20 minutes.

== League table ==
Pos	Team	Pld	W	D	L	GF	GA	GD	Pts	Qualification or relegation
1	Cliftonville (C)	38	26	7	5	88	39	+49	85	Qualification to Champions League second qualifying round
2	Linfield	38	24	7	7	81	46	+35	79	Qualification to Europa League first qualifying round
3	Crusaders	38	18	12	8	67	42	+25	66	Qualification to Europa League first qualifying round
4	Portadown	38	18	8	12	77	53	+24	62	
5	Glentoran	38	16	11	11	54	42	+12	59	
6	Glenavon	38	15	6	17	75	79	−4	51	Qualification to Europa League first qualifying round (Note: Glenavon qualified for the 2014–15 UEFA Europa League first qualifying round by winning the 2013–14 Irish Cup.)
7	Ballymena United	38	13	8	17	48	59	−11	47	
8	Dungannon Swifts	38	12	8	18	49	66	−17	44	
9	Coleraine	38	10	12	16	51	61	−10	42	
10	Ballinamallard United	38	10	9	19	35	70	−35	39	
11	Warrenpoint Town	38	10	6	22	43	72	−29	36	
12	Ards (R)	38	6	6	26	44	83	−39	24	Relegation to NIFL Championship 1

Source: rsssf.com
Rules for classification: 1st points; 2nd goal difference; 3rd number of goals scored; 4th head-to-head points; 5th head-to-head goal difference
(C) Champions; (R) Relegated

== Results ==
=== Matches 1–22 ===
During matches 1–22 each team played every other team twice (home and away).

Home \ Away	ARD	BMD	BYM	CLI	COL	CRU	DUN	GLA	GLT	LIN	POR	WPT
Ards		4–1	2–0	0–4	3–1	1–4	2–3	1–2	0–0	1–3	3–1	1–2
Ballinamallard United	1–0		1–0	0–2	1–1	1–0	1–1	0–2	1–4	1–2	2–1	3–0
Ballymena United	4–2	2–0		0–1	2–2	1–0	2–1	3–6	3–4	1–4	2–1	0–1
Cliftonville	4–2	1–0	2–1		1–3	0–2	2–2	2–1	4–1	3–0	1–2	1–1
Coleraine	2–1	1–2	2–3	3–4		2–2	0–2	3–2	1–3	2–3	2–2	3–2
Crusaders	4–2	2–1	1–2	1–1	4–0		1–1	3–0	0–0	2–0	2–2	2–0
Dungannon Swifts	1–0	1–0	2–3	1–1	1–0	0–1		3–3	1–2	1–0	0–5	1–2
Glenavon	4–1	2–3	0–0	1–0	2–2	2–2	1–3		1–2	1–3	3–2	3–1
Glentoran	5–0	0–0	0–0	1–1	1–1	0–3	2–1	0–0		1–2	0–2	3–0
Linfield	5–2	3–0	4–1	2–4	1–0	0–0	2–0	3–2	0–0		3–2	5–1
Portadown	2–0	11–0	1–0	3–3	2–0	0–1	2–1	2–4	2–1	1–1		2–0
Warrenpoint Town	2–0	2–2	0–2	2–4	2–1	1–1	2–3	1–2	0–1	0–2	2–2	

Source: rsssf.com
Legend: Blue = home team win; Yellow = draw; Red = away team win.

=== Matches 23–33 ===
During matches 23–33 each team played every other team for the third time (either at home, or away).

Home \ Away	ARD	BMD	BYM	CLI	COL	CRU	DUN	GLA	GLT	LIN	POR	WPT
Ards			0–0	2–3			1–3		2–1		1–2	
Ballinamallard United	1–0					1–2		1–2	0–3			2–3
Ballymena United		1–0		1–3	2–2			2–1		1–2		3–2
Cliftonville		5–0			2–0	4–0				1–0	0–1	
Coleraine	2–0	1–1				1–0				0–0	2–3	3–0
Crusaders	4–1		1–0				5–1	2–2	2–1			
Dungannon Swifts		1–1	2–3	1–2	0–2				0–1			
Glenavon	3–1			2–5	3–1		3–2		2–3		4–2	
Glentoran			3–0	0–0	1–1					0–1	2–2	1–2
Linfield	3–3	6–0				1–1	3–0	2–1				
Portadown		1–0	1–0			1–1	4–2			1–2		3–0
Warrenpoint Town	0–2			0–2		1–1	0–1	2–1		2–3		

Source: rsssf.com
Legend: Blue = home team win; Yellow = draw; Red = away team win.

=== Matches 34–38 ===
During matches 34–38 each team played every other team in their half of the table once. As this was the fourth time that teams had played each other this season, home sides were chosen so that they had played each other twice at home and twice away.

==== Section A ====
Home \ Away	CLI	CRU	GLA	GLT	LIN	POR
Cliftonville			5–0	2–0		
Crusaders	2–3				2–3	3–1
Glenavon		1–3			2–5	
Glentoran		3–0	0–4			
Linfield	1–3			0–2		1–1
Portadown	0–2		3–0	1–2		

Source: rsssf.com
Legend: Blue = home team win; Yellow = draw; Red = away team win.

==== Section B ====
Home \ Away	ARD	BMD	BYM	COL	DUN	WPT
Ards		0–0		0–1		2–2
Ballinamallard United			0–0	2–1	2–2	
Ballymena United	1–1				1–2	
Coleraine			1–1		0–0	
Dungannon Swifts	2–0					0–4
Warrenpoint Town		0–3	1–0	0–1		

Source: rsssf.com
Legend: Blue = home team win; Yellow = draw; Red = away team win.

== Top scorers ==
Rank	Scorer	Club	Goals
1	(Northern Ireland) Joe Gormley	Cliftonville	27
2	(Northern Ireland) Darren Murray	Portadown	23
3	(Northern Ireland) Andrew Waterworth	Linfield	22
4	(Northern Ireland) Liam Boyce	Cliftonville	21
5	(Scotland) Gary Twigg	Portadown	19
6	(Northern Ireland) Darren Boyce	Ballymena United†	16
6	(Northern Ireland) Jordan Owens	Crusaders	16
8	(England) Guy Bates	Glenavon	14
8	(Northern Ireland) Paul Heatley	Crusaders	14
10	(Northern Ireland) Daniel Hughes	Warrenpoint Town	12

† Darren Boyce scored 12 goals for Dungannon Swifts while on loan from parent club Coleraine, before transferring to Ballymena United in January 2014.

== Promotion/relegation play-off ==
The play-off did not take place this season because Bangor, runners-up of the 2013–14 NIFL Championship 1, did not possess a licence to participate in top-flight football.
