= North Belfast derby =

Association football rivalry

- Location: Belfast, Northern Ireland
- Teams: Cliftonville; Crusaders
- First meeting: Cliftonville 1–0 Crusaders; County Antrim Shield (13 January 1923)
- Latest meeting: Cliftonville 2–1 Crusaders; NIFL Premiership (7 August 2026)
- Next meeting: Crusaders v Cliftonville; NIFL Premiership (26 December 2026)
- Stadiums: Solitude (Cliftonville); Seaview (Crusaders)

Statistics
- Total meetings: 323
- Most wins: Crusaders (159)
- Top scorer: Jordan Owens (26)
- All-time series: Crusaders – 159; Cliftonville – 96; Draws – 68
- Largest victory: Crusaders 8–0 Cliftonville; 1972–73 City Cup (4 November 1972)

The North Belfast derby is the name given to association football matches between Cliftonville and Crusaders who play in Belfast, Northern Ireland. The two are separated by around 1.5 miles with Cliftonville based at Solitude on Cliftonville Road and Crusaders at Seaview on the Shore Road.

The rivalry between the two clubs began in 1949 with Crusaders' ascension to senior football. For the majority of years the rivalry was simply competitive and geographical. The rivalry was heightened during The Troubles, and as the religious and political demographics within Belfast changed, Cliftonville began to develop a mainly nationalist following and Crusaders a unionist following. While there have been unsavoury incidents in the past between the clubs and the rivalry is fierce and intense on the pitch, off the pitch they have developed a strong cross-community relationship in recent years.

The two sides have met each other on over 300 occasions, and have met in three national cup finals (the 2009 Irish Cup final, 2013 League Cup final and 2014 League Cup final) and one regional cup final (the 1979 County Antrim Shield final). The two sides have also won twelve league titles between them, five of these wins coming in six seasons; Cliftonville winning in 2012–13 and 2013–14, and Crusaders winning in 2014–15, 2015–16 and 2017–18.

Both clubs also share rivalries with the Belfast 'Big Two' of Glentoran and Linfield, but the success disparity between the pairs of clubs has seen two distinct rivalries formed.

== History ==
Founded in 1879, Cliftonville are Ireland's oldest football team, and along with Distillery, Glentoran and Linfield were founder members of the Irish League, and are one of three teams never to have been relegated and to have competed in every top-flight season (along with Glentoran and Linfield). Although a major force in the first 20 years of Irish football their strict amateur status (not dropped until the early 1970s) meant they were also-rans for long periods once professionalism took hold. Once professional they added a cup win in 1979 and a league title in late 1990s.

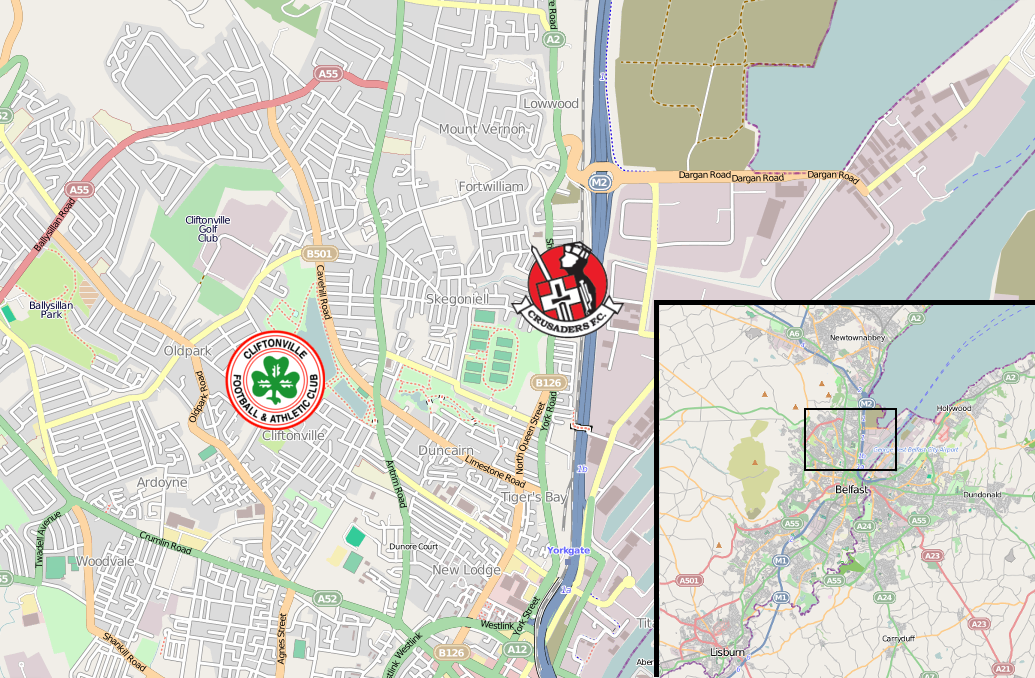
Location of Solitude (left) and Seaview in North Belfast

Founded in 1898, Crusaders applied unsuccessfully for many years to join the Irish League and became one of the top junior sides in the country, but it was not until 1949-50 season following the resignation of Belfast Celtic they finally entered the league. They endured a tough start but became a major side during the 1960s, winning two Irish Cups, and also having successful spells in the 1970s and 1990s, winning two league titles in each decade.

The first match between the two clubs took place on 13 January 1923 in the first round of the County Antrim Shield at Solitude; this was also Crusaders first ever match in senior competition. The senior side of Cliftonville was too good for the intermediate Crusaders team, with the Reds recording a 1–0 victory. The first game between the two sides as senior teams took place in the Ulster Cup on 17 September 1949, finishing in a 2–2 draw at Solitude. The first league match and Boxing Day derby took place on 26 December 1949, with Cliftonville emerging victorious with a 5–0 victory at Seaview. In 1979, at the height of The Troubles, there were more than 1,900 police officers on duty for the Ulster Cup match on 21 September between Crusaders and Cliftonville at Seaview, more than has ever been recorded at a football match in the United Kingdom.

The sides first played each other in a cup final in 1978–79, with Cliftonville winning the County Antrim Shield in a penalty shoot-out, but with Glentoran and Linfield dominating Northern Irish football the sides did not reach a national cup final together until the 2008–09 season when they met in the final of the 2008–09 Irish Cup. Crusaders won the match 1–0 in front of 7,500 fans at Windsor Park. It would be not long before the two met again in a cup final as in the 2012-13 season with the sides first and second in the league table they played each other in the final of the 2012–13 Irish League Cup with Cliftonville emphatically winning 4–0 at Windsor Park. The following season they played again the League Cup Final but this time in a more cagey affair. Finishing 0–0 after extra time Cliftonville retained the cup with a 3–2 win on penalties.

A fixture during the 2012–13 season came to national media attention after a game was cancelled due to a Loyalist flag protest. Going into the fixture on 16 February 2013 Cliftonville led the Irish Premier League with a twelve-point lead, Crusaders in second had a game in hand and hoped a win over their rivals could see them falter. A small group of 20 flag protesters turned up half an hour before kick off and engaged in skirmishes with police. Around 2000 fans were in attendance but many supporters were unable to enter due to the protesters outside the turnstiles. The decision was made to cancel the game with condemnation of the protesters tactics and police's handling of the situation. Due to fixture congestion it was not rearranged until 22 April by which time Cliftonville had long won the title. Despite praise for both clubs during the incident further controversy emerged for the rearranged fixture when Crusaders on advice of the police only offered 200 tickets for away supporters (around 800 would be normal). Cliftonville fans issued a boycott of fixture (seven tickets were purchased, presumably to ticket stub collectors) leaving a completely empty away stand and total attendance of just 395.

In September 2018 the derby was chosen to be the first live NIFL Premiership match to be shown on BBC Two Northern Ireland, a part of a three-year deal between BBC Sport NI, the Irish Football Association and Northern Ireland Football League.

== Supporters ==
In the early to mid 20th century Cliftonville's support was less polarised and they were seen as a cross community team in comparison to Crusaders, who had traditionally been regarded as a Unionist club. During the Troubles the Cliftonville support came to be regarded as a nationalist club due to their location along the Cliftonville Road. With road blocks and cross community violence meaning that many away supporters no longer felt safe venturing to Solitude or Seaview. However, in recent years, with the streets safer than before, many supporters of both away teams choose to walk to their opponent's ground, given the close proximity of the grounds and the fact that both teams have largely local supports.

Despite the community differences the rivalry between supporters is fairly amicable and brings financial benefits to both clubs. A sell out league fixture can bring in an income of £30,000. As is the tradition with many other derbies in the Irish League, each season a fixture is played on Boxing Day, unless this day falls on a Sunday.

== Head-to-head ==
In results between the two teams, Crusaders have 159 victories to Cliftonville's 93. Crusaders have won more games in the league, County Antrim Shield, Ulster Cup and the City Cup, whereas Cliftonville have won more head-to heads in the Irish Cup, League Cup, Setanta Sports Cup, Gold Cup and Belfast Charity Cup. It should also be noted that Cliftonville's amateur status meant that they were rarely competitive until the early 1970s, losing most of their games and finishing bottom of the table on several occasions.

=== By competition ===
As of 7 August 2026

Outcome	League	Irish Cup	League Cup	County Antrim Shield	Setanta Sports Cup	Gold Cup	Ulster Cup	City Cup	Charity Cup	Playoffs	Total
Crusaders win	100	4	2	9	0	3	28	11	2	0	159
Cliftonville win	55	6	8	7	2	6	1	10	0	1	96
Draw	47	1	1	0	0	3	10	6	0	0	68
Total fixtures	202	11	11	16	2	12	39	27	2	1	323

- Ulster Cup was renamed Festival of Britain Cup in 1952, so results are included in Ulster Cup total
- All games that went to penalty shoot-outs counted as wins/losses

=== By venue ===
As of 7 August 2026

Outcome	Seaview	Solitude	Windsor Park	The Oval	Total
Crusaders win	86	68	3	2	159
Cliftonville win	36	53	3	4	96
Draw	36	32	0	0	68
Total fixtures	158	153	6	6	323

- All games that went to penalty shoot-outs counted as wins/losses

== Clubs' honours ==
=== Overall ===
In total, Cliftonville have won 49 senior honours to Crusaders' 32. Crusaders did not become a senior side until after World War II, and thus the only senior competitions they could enter from 1898 to 1949 were the Irish Cup (by invitation, having won the Irish Intermediate Cup or Intermediate League the season before) or the County Antrim Shield (again by invitation).

While Crusaders suffered relegation to intermediate football in 2005 for one season, Cliftonville have never lost senior status and have competed in every top-flight season since 1890.

Competition	League titles	Irish Cup	League Cup	County Antrim Shield	Charity Shield	Setanta Sports Cup	Gold Cup	Ulster Cup	Floodlit Cup	Others^{1}	Total
Cliftonville	5*	9	7	11	2	0	3	0	1	11	49
Crusaders	7	6	2	8	2	1	2	3	0	1	32
Combined Total	12*	15	9	19	4	1	5	3	1	12	81

- ^{1} Includes other defunct senior trophies such as Belfast Charities Cup, Alhambra Cup, and Carlsberg Cup
- (*) Includes 1 shared league title

=== 1949 to present ===
Since 1949 (when both teams commenced competing at the same level), Crusaders have won 32 honours to Cliftonville's 22.

Competition	League titles	Irish Cup	League Cup	County Antrim Shield	Charity Shield	Setanta Sports Cup	Gold Cup	Ulster Cup	Floodlit Cup	Carlsberg Cup	Total
Crusaders	7	6	2	8	2	1	2	3	0	1	32
Cliftonville	3	2	7	7	2	0	1	0	1	0	22
Combined Total	10	8	9	15	4	1	3	3	1	1	54

== Results ==
All time results taken from Irish Football Club Project, British Newspaper Archive, and various other sources. Attendance figures from ifapremiership.com

Key

Cliftonville win
Crusaders win
Draw

=== League ===
Since 1949, the two sides have played each other in the domestic league at least twice every season, except for the 2005–06 season.

		Cliftonville vs Crusaders				Crusaders vs Cliftonville			
Season	Division	Date	Venue	Score	Attendance	Date	Venue	Score	Attendance
1949–50	Irish League	18 March 1950	Solitude	2–7		26 December 1949	Seaview	0–5	
1950–51	Irish League	25 November 1950	Solitude	3–2		3 February 1951	Seaview	4–4	
1951–52	Irish League	22 March 1952	Solitude	2–1		25 December 1951	Seaview	1–0	
1952–53	Irish League	24 December 1952	Solitude	3–1		11 April 1953	Seaview	4–2	
1953–54	Irish League	23 January 1954	Solitude	2–3		25 December 1953	Seaview	4–0	
1954–55	Irish League	24 December 1954	Solitude	0–1		19 March 1955	Seaview	1–4	
1955–56	Irish League	17 March 1955	Solitude	1–1		26 December 1955	Seaview	1–1	
1956–57	Irish League	17 November 1956	Solitude	0–2		19 January 1957	Seaview	4–1	
1957–58	Irish League	18 January 1958	Solitude	4–3		19 April 1958	Seaview	4–2	
1958–59	Irish League	27 December 1958	Solitude	1–3		30 March 1959	Seaview	3–0	
1959–60	Irish League	19 April 1960	Solitude	0–1		2 January 1960	Seaview	4–1	
1960–61	Irish League	3 December 1960	Solitude	3–1		15 April 1961	Seaview	2–1	
1961–62	Irish League	7 April 1962	Solitude	1–2		16 December 1961	Seaview	6–0	
1962–63	Irish League	19 January 1962	Solitude	1–5		16 April 1963	Seaview	3–2	
1963–64	Irish League	14 December 1963	Solitude	2–1		31 March 1964	Seaview	4–0	
1964–65	Irish League	24 December 1964	Solitude	0–3		30 January 1965	Seaview	5–0	
1965–66	Irish League	27 November 1965	Solitude	0–4		5 February 1966	Seaview	7–1	
1966–67	Irish League	17 December 1966	Solitude	0–0		24 September 1966	Seaview	3–2	
1967–68	Irish League	28 October 1967	Solitude	1–3		30 December 1967	Seaview	6–2	
1968–69	Irish League	19 October 1968	Solitude	1–3		26 December 1968	Seaview	2–2	
1969–70	Irish League	8 November 1969	Solitude	0–2		17 January 1970	Seaview	8–3	
1970–71	Irish League	6 March 1971	Solitude	0–2		12 December 1970	Seaview	4–1	
1971–72	Irish League	11 December 1971	Solitude	0–1		4 March 1972	Seaview	3–0	
1972–73	Irish League	12 April 1973	Solitude	0–1		25 November 1972	Seaview	3–0	
1973–74	Irish League	3 November 1973	Solitude	2–1		20 April 1974	Seaview	2–0	
1974–75	Irish League	21 December 1974	Solitude	0–4		8 March 1975	Seaview	6–1	
1975–76	Irish League	22 November 1975	Solitude	0–2		24 January 1976	Seaview	4–1	
1976–77	Irish League	29 January 1977	Solitude	0–3		20 November 1976	Seaview	6–2	
1977–78	Irish League	26 November 1977	Solitude	1–0		28 January 1978	Seaview	2–2	
1978–79	Irish League	10 February 1979	Solitude	1–0		25 November 1978	Seaview	2–2	
1979–80	Irish League	10 November 1979	Solitude	1–0		9 February 1980	Seaview	1–0	
1980–81	Irish League	7 February 1981	Solitude	0–0		29 November 1980	Seaview	1–0	
1981–82	Irish League	2 January 1982	Solitude	1–2		10 April 1982	Seaview	1–0^{1}	
1982–83	Irish League	9 April 1983	Solitude	1–0		3 January 1983	Seaview	2–1	
1983–84	Irish League	22 February 1984	Solitude	0–1		21 January 1984	Seaview	1–4	
1984–85	Irish League	12 January 1985	Solitude	0–0		26 January 1985	Seaview	3–2	
1985–86	Irish League	29 April 1986	Solitude	2–1		15 January 1986	Seaview	2–1	
1986–87	Irish League	11 October 1986	Solitude	2–1		3 January 1987	Seaview	3–2	
1987–88	Irish League	5 March 1988	Solitude	0–0		19 December 1987	Seaview	2–0	
1988–89	Irish League	10 December 1988	Solitude	1–0		4 March 1989	Seaview	1–2	
1989–90	Irish League	26 December 1989	Solitude	2–2		18 April 1990	Seaview	1–1	
1990–91	Irish League	17 November 1990	Solitude	3–1		16 March 1991	Seaview	1–1	
1991–92	Irish League	29 February 1992	Solitude	2–2		16 November 1991	Seaview	5–1	
1992–93	Irish League	24 October 1992	Solitude	1–2		30 January 1993	Seaview	1–2	
1993–94	Irish League	27 December 1993	Solitude	2–1		30 April 1994	Seaview	1–1	
1994–95	Irish League	29 April 1995	Solitude	2–2		26 December 1994	Seaview	1–0	
1995–96	Irish League	26 December 1995	Solitude	1–4		4 November 1995	Seaview	1–0	
1995–96	Irish League	20 April 1996	Solitude	2–1		17 February 1996	Seaview	1–1	
1996–97	Irish League	26 October 1996	Solitude	1–1		10 December 1996	Seaview	2–1	
1996–97	Irish League	1 February 1997	Solitude	0–2		1 April 1997	Seaview	3–0	
1997–98	Irish League	30 August 1997	Solitude	2–2		1 November 1997	Seaview	2–2	
1997–98	Irish League	10 February 1998	Solitude	0–1		7 March 1998	Seaview	0–2	
1998–99	Irish League	14 November 1998	Solitude	2–3		5 September 1998	Seaview	2–1	
1998–99	Irish League	6 March 1998	Solitude	1–1		26 December 1998	Seaview	1–0	
1999–00	Irish League	30 October 1999	Solitude	1–1		31 August 1999	Seaview	1–1	
1999–00	Irish League	27 December 1999	Solitude	1–1		18 March 2000	Seaview	1–1	
2000–01	Irish League	28 October 2000	Solitude	1–1		26 August 2000	Seaview	0–4	
2000–01	Irish League	20 March 2001	Solitude	0–3		26 December 2000	Seaview	1–2	
2001–02	Irish League	26 December 2001	Solitude	1–1		31 August 2001	Seaview	0–2	
2001–02	Irish League	16 March 2002	Solitude	3–0		27 October 2001	Seaview	1–3	
2002–03	Irish League	12 October 2002	Solitude	0–1		26 December 2002	Seaview	0–0	
2002–03	Irish League	22 March 2003	Solitude	0–1		22 April 2003	Seaview	1–0	
2003–04	Irish Premier League	26 December 2003	Solitude	0–1		24 April 2004	Seaview	0–0	
2004–05	Irish Premier League	23 April 2005	Solitude	1–0		27 December 2004	Seaview	0–2	
2006–07	Irish Premier League	26 December 2006	Solitude	4–2		14 April 2007	Seaview	1–2	
2007–08	Irish Premier League	22 April 2008	Solitude	0–1		26 December 2007	Seaview	1–1	
2008–09	IFA Premiership	26 December 2008	Solitude	1–1	1,426	4 October 2008	Seaview	3–1	820
2008–09	IFA Premiership	25 April 2009	Solitude	0–0	782	14 March 2009	Seaview	4–2	685
2009–10	IFA Premiership	17 October 2009	Solitude	1–2	938	18 August 2009	Seaview	2–3	765
2009–10	IFA Premiership	8 April 2010	Solitude	1–0	902	26 December 2009	Seaview	1–2	2,105
2010–11	IFA Premiership	27 December 2010	Solitude	2–1	1,644	27 August 2010	Seaview	1–3	1,352
2010–11	IFA Premiership	26 April 2011	Solitude	3–0	719	19 March 2011	Seaview	5–0	1,134
2011–12	IFA Premiership	22 October 2011	Solitude	2–1	954	17 September 2011	Seaview	2–2	817
2011–12	IFA Premiership	14 April 2012	Solitude	1–1	732	26 December 2011	Seaview	3–2	2,457
2012–13	IFA Premiership	26 December 2012	Solitude	1–0	2,883	13 October 2012	Seaview	3–1	2,079
2012–13	IFA Premiership	2 April 2013	Solitude	3–1	2,221	22 April 2013	Seaview	3–0	395
2013–14	NIFL Premiership	5 October 2013	Solitude	0–2	1,577	26 December 2013	Seaview	1–1	2,129
2013–14	NIFL Premiership	15 February 2014	Solitude	4–0	1,584	26 April 2014	Solitude	2–3	2,687
2014–15	NIFL Premiership	26 December 2014	Solitude	0–1	3,019	4 October 2014	Seaview	0–1	1,611
2014–15	NIFL Premiership	11 April 2015	Solitude	0–1	1,532	15 November 2014	Seaview	4–1	2,039
2015–16	NIFL Premiership	5 September 2015	Solitude	0–1	1,883	26 December 2015	Seaview	2–2	2,784
2015–16	NIFL Premiership	19 April 2016	Solitude	1–3	1,584	20 February 2016	Seaview	1–0	1,975
2016–17	NIFL Premiership	26 December 2016	Solitude	0–4	3,109	1 October 2016	Seaview	4–3	1,789
2016–17	NIFL Premiership	15 April 2017	Solitude	2–3	1,612	21 January 2017	Seaview	1–0	1,702
2017–18	NIFL Premiership	26 August 2017	Solitude	1–2	1,417	26 December 2017	Seaview	2–0	3,018
2017–18	NIFL Premiership	10 March 2018	Solitude	3–1	1,573	21 April 2018	Seaview	1–1	1,683
2018–19	NIFL Premiership	26 December 2018	Solitude	1–5	2,336	6 October 2018	Seaview	3–2	1,571
2018–19	NIFL Premiership	20 April 2019	Solitude	2–0	1,361	16 March 2019	Seaview	2–0	1,168
2019–20	NIFL Premiership	17 August 2019	Solitude	0–2	1,376	26 December 2019	Seaview	1–2	2,824
2019–20	NIFL Premiership	17 August 2019	Solitude	0–2	1,376	3 March 2020	Seaview	0–0	1,359
2020–21	NIFL Premiership	9 January 2021	Solitude	2–2	0	23 October 2020	Seaview	1–0	323
2020–21	NIFL Premiership	25 May 2021	Solitude	1–1	500	10 April 2021	Seaview	2–2	0
2021–22	NIFL Premiership	4 January 2022	Solitude	0–2	2,305	11 September 2021	Seaview	1–1	1,945
2021–22	NIFL Premiership	26 February 2022	Solitude	3–1	2,035	23 April 2022	Seaview	3–3	2,649
2022–23	NIFL Premiership	7 October 2022	Solitude	0–0	2,046	26 December 2022	Seaview	3–0	3,056
2022–23	NIFL Premiership	22 April 2023	Solitude	3–3	1,584	13 March 2023	Seaview	2–2	2,188
2023–24	NIFL Premiership	25 November 2023	Solitude	3–0	2,048	18 September 2023	Seaview	0–3	2,614
2023–24	NIFL Premiership	26 December 2023	Solitude	2–1	2,356	16 April 2024	Seaview	2–1	2,013
2024–25	NIFL Premiership	1 November 2024	Solitude	1–0	2,085	24 August 2024	Seaview	1–1	2,316
2024–25	NIFL Premiership	1 November 2024	Solitude	1–0	2,085	26 December 2024	Seaview	2–0	2,857
2025–26	NIFL Premiership	26 December 2025	Solitude	1–2	2,300	10 March 2026	Seaview	0–1	1,882
2025–26	NIFL Premiership	21 February 2026	Solitude	5–2	1,917	10 March 2026	Seaview	0–1	1,882
2026–27	NIFL Premiership	7 August 2026	Solitude	2–1	2,392	26 December 2026	Seaview		
2026–27	NIFL Premiership	7 August 2026	Solitude	2–1	2,392	20 February 2027	Seaview		

- ^{1} Initial game on 2 January abandoned at 1–1

=== Irish Cup ===
The Irish Cup saw the teams meet in a national cup final for the first time ever in 2009.

Season	Date	Round	Stadium	Home team	Result	Away team	Attendance
1926–27	5 February 1927	Semi-final	The Oval	Crusaders	2–4	Cliftonville	
1970–71	13 February 1971	First round	Seaview	Crusaders	3–1	Cliftonville	
1990–91	16 February 1991	Sixth round	Solitude	Cliftonville	0–0	Crusaders	
1990–91	20 February 1991	Sixth round replay	Seaview	Crusaders	3–2	Cliftonville	
1996–97	15 March 1997	Quarter-final	Solitude	Cliftonville	3–1	Crusaders	
2007–08	9 February 2008	Sixth round	Solitude	Cliftonville	1–0	Crusaders	
2008–09	9 May 2009	Final	Windsor Park	Cliftonville *	0–1	Crusaders	7,500
2012–13	6 April 2013	Semi-final	The Oval	Crusaders *	0–2	Cliftonville	1,700
2017–18	3 February 2018	Sixth round	Solitude	Cliftonville	4–1	Crusaders	1,900
2021–22	1 April 2022	Semi-final	Windsor Park	Cliftonville *	1–2	Crusaders	
2024–25	1 March 2025	Quarter-final	Seaview	Crusaders	1–2	Cliftonville	

- ^{*} Final, Semi-final played at/as a neutral venue, nominated as home side

=== League Cup ===
The Northern Ireland Football League Cup was established in 1986, with the first meeting between the sides coming in 1995, and the most recent in the 2014 final.

Season	Date	Round	Stadium	Home team	Result	Away team	Attendance
1994–95	13 April 1995	Semi-final	Windsor Park	Cliftonville	2–0	Crusaders	
1995–96	29 August 1995	Quarter-final	Solitude	Cliftonville	0–0 (0–3 pens)	Crusaders	
1998–99	2 March 1999	Quarter-final	Seaview	Crusaders	1–2 (aet)	Cliftonville	
2001–02	9 October 2001	Group Stage	Seaview	Crusaders	2–0	Cliftonville	
2002–03	24 September 2002	Group Stage	Solitude	Cliftonville	1–1	Crusaders	
2003–04	15 October 2003	Semi-final	The Oval	Cliftonville	1–1 (4–1 pens)	Crusaders	
2006–07	8 November 2006	Semi-final	The Oval	Cliftonville	1–0	Crusaders	
2007–08	18 August 2007	Group Stage	Seaview	Crusaders	1–4	Cliftonville	
2007–08	1 September 2007	Group Stage	Solitude	Cliftonville	1–0	Crusaders	
2012–13	26 January 2013	Final	Windsor Park	Cliftonville *	4–0	Crusaders	4,948
2013–14	25 January 2014	Final	Solitude	Cliftonville *	0–0 (3–2 pens)	Crusaders	4,300

- ^{*} Final, Semi-final played at/as a neutral venue, nominated as home side

=== County Antrim Shield ===
The County Antrim Shield is a regional competition open to senior and intermediate clubs. Established in 1888, the tournament saw the first ever meeting between the sides in 1923, and the most recent meeting came in the quarter-finals in 2018.

Season	Date	Round	Stadium	Home team	Result	Away team	Attendance
1922–23	13 January 1923	First round	Solitude	Cliftonville	1–0	Crusaders	
1953–54	6 March 1954	Quarter-final	Solitude	Cliftonville	0–4	Crusaders	
1970–71	24 March 1971	Quarter-final	Seaview	Crusaders	1–0	Cliftonville	
1973–74	6 May 1974	Quarter-final	Seaview	Crusaders	3–0	Cliftonville	
1975–76	13 April 1976	First round	Solitude	Cliftonville	1–4	Crusaders	
1978–79	14 May 1979	Final	Seaview	Crusaders	0–0 (1–3 pens)	Cliftonville	
1983–84	26 April 1984	Semi-final	Windsor Park	Crusaders	3–2	Cliftonville	
1992–93	16 December 1992	Quarter-final	Seaview	Crusaders	1–0	Cliftonville	
1996–97	14 January 1997	Semi-final	Windsor Park	Cliftonville	2–1	Crusaders	
1998–99	1 December 1998	First round	Solitude	Cliftonville	2–0	Crusaders	
2000–01	13 December 2000	Quarter-final	Seaview	Crusaders	0–3	Cliftonville	
2001–02	11 December 2001	Quarter-final	Seaview^{1}	Cliftonville	2–0	Crusaders	
2004–05	2 February 2005	Semi-final	The Oval	Crusaders	1–0	Cliftonville	
2017–18	30 October 2017	Quarter-final	Solitude	Cliftonville	2–3	Crusaders	
2018–19	23 October 2018	Quarter-final	Seaview	Crusaders	4–3 (aet)	Cliftonville	
2025–26	2 September 2025	First round	Solitude	Cliftonville	2–0	Crusaders	

- ^{1} Cliftonville nominated as home side but game took place at Seaview

=== European playoffs ===
The two sides met each other for the first time in the NIFL Premiership European playoffs for a place in the 2021–22 UEFA Europa Conference League.

Season	Date	Round	Stadium	Home team	Result	Away team	Attendance
2020–21	1 June 2021	Play-off semi-final	Solitude	Cliftonville	0–0 (5–4 pens)	Crusaders	

=== Setanta Cup ===
The Setanta Sports Cup was a cross-border competition open to clubs from all over Ireland, following on from previous competitions such as the Dublin and Belfast Inter-City Cup, North-South Cup, Blaxnit Cup, Texaco Cup, Tyler Cup and Irish News Cup. Having never played each other in any of these competitions, the Setanta Cup saw the only meeting of the two sides in all-Ireland competition in 2011. Established in 2005, the Setanta Cup was last played in 2014.

Season	Date	Round	Stadium	Home team	Result	Away team	Attendance
2010–11	14 March 2011	Quarter-final 1st leg	Solitude	Cliftonville	4–2	Crusaders	581
2010–11	21 March 2011	Quarter-final 2nd leg	Seaview	Crusaders	4–6	Cliftonville	527

=== Gold Cup ===
The Gold Cup was a competition which was previously open to senior clubs from 1911 to 2001. The two sides first met in this competition in 1962 with the final meeting coming in 1987.

Season	Date	Round	Stadium	Home team	Result	Away team	Attendance
1962–63	11 September 1962	Group Stage	Seaview	Crusaders	3–4	Cliftonville	
1976–77	16 October 1976	Group Stage	Seaview	Crusaders	0–3	Cliftonville	
1977–78	22 October 1977	Group Stage	Solitude	Cliftonville	2–1	Crusaders	
1978–79	28 October 1978	Group Stage	Seaview	Crusaders	1–1	Cliftonville	
1979–80	10 November 1979	Group Stage	Solitude	Cliftonville	3–1	Crusaders	
1980–81	8 November 1980	Group Stage	Seaview	Crusaders	3–1	Cliftonville	
1981–82	7 November 1981	Group Stage	Solitude	Cliftonville	1–1	Crusaders	
1982–83	31 August 1982	Group Stage	Seaview	Crusaders	1–1	Cliftonville	
1983–84	26 August 1983	Group Stage	Seaview	Crusaders	0–3	Cliftonville	
1984–85	25 August 1984	Group Stage	Solitude	Cliftonville	1–3	Crusaders	
1985–86	12 October 1985	Group Stage	Seaview	Crusaders	3–1	Cliftonville	
1986–87	7 March 1987	Group Stage	Seaview	Crusaders	0–1	Cliftonville	

=== Ulster Cup ===
The Ulster Cup was also a competition which was open to senior clubs from 1949 to 1997. Like the City Cup, the Ulster Cup was an annual fixture until the early 1980s (sometimes twice a season) when it was split into groups. Traditionally the opening competition of the season, this cup saw the first senior meeting of the clubs in 1949, with the last meeting between the two coming in 1997.

Season	Date	Round	Stadium	Home team	Result	Away team	Attendance
1949–50	17 September 1949	Group Stage	Solitude	Cliftonville	2–2	Crusaders	
1950–51	28 August 1950	Group Stage	Seaview	Crusaders	0–1	Cliftonville	
1951–52*	13 September 1951	Group Stage	Seaview	Crusaders	3–2	Cliftonville	
1951–52*	24 September 1951	Group Stage	Seaview	Crusaders	4–2	Cliftonville	
1952–53	16 August 1952	Group Stage	Seaview	Crusaders	3–2	Cliftonville	
1952–53	6 September 1952	Group Stage	Solitude	Cliftonville	2–2	Crusaders	
1953–54	15 August 1953	Group Stage	Solitude	Cliftonville	1–3	Crusaders	
1953–54	14 September 1953	Group Stage	Seaview	Crusaders	1–0	Cliftonville	
1954–55	25 August 1954	Group Stage	Solitude	Cliftonville	1–5	Crusaders	
1955–56	24 August 1955	Group Stage	Seaview	Crusaders	1–1	Cliftonville	
1956–57	15 September 1956	Group Stage	Seaview	Crusaders	2–1	Cliftonville	
1957–58	20 August 1957	Group Stage	Seaview	Crusaders	2–1	Cliftonville	
1958–59	20 August 1958	Group Stage	Solitude	Cliftonville	1–2	Crusaders	
1959–60	19 August 1959	Group Stage	Seaview	Crusaders	4–0	Cliftonville	
1960–61	24 August 1960	Group Stage	Seaview	Crusaders	5–2	Cliftonville	
1961–62	22 August 1961	Group Stage	Seaview	Crusaders	1–0	Cliftonville	
1962–63	21 August 1962	Group Stage	Solitude	Cliftonville	1–5	Crusaders	
1963–64	21 August 1963	Group Stage	Seaview	Crusaders	2–0	Cliftonville	
1964–65	26 August 1964	Group Stage	Solitude	Cliftonville	1–3	Crusaders	
1965–66	10 August 1965	Group Stage	Seaview	Crusaders	2–2	Cliftonville	
1966–67	10 August 1966	Group Stage	Solitude	Cliftonville	1–4	Crusaders	
1967–68	25 August 1967	Group Stage	Seaview	Crusaders	2–2	Cliftonville	
1968–69	3 August 1968	Group Stage	Solitude	Cliftonville	2–3	Crusaders	
1969–70	13 August 1969	Group Stage	Seaview	Crusaders	3–0	Cliftonville	
1970–71	18 August 1970	Group Stage	Solitude	Cliftonville	0–2	Crusaders	
1971–72	28 September 1971	Group Stage	Seaview	Crusaders	2–2	Cliftonville	
1972–73	22 August 1972	Group Stage	Solitude	Cliftonville	0–1	Crusaders	
1973–74	21 August 1973	Group Stage	Seaview	Crusaders	3–1	Cliftonville	
1974–75	20 August 1974	Group Stage	Solitude	Cliftonville	1–1	Crusaders	
1975–76	19 August 1975	Group Stage	Solitude^{1}	Crusaders	3–1	Cliftonville	
1976–77	25 September 1976	Group Stage	Seaview	Crusaders	2–0	Cliftonville	
1977–78	24 September 1977	Group Stage	Solitude	Cliftonville	0–2	Crusaders	
1978–79	23 September 1978	Group Stage	Seaview	Crusaders	1–1	Cliftonville	
1979–80	21 August 1979	Group Stage	Seaview	Crusaders	1–1	Cliftonville	
1980–81	19 August 1980	Group Stage	Solitude	Cliftonville	1–3	Crusaders	
1981–82	19 September 1981	Group Stage	Solitude	Cliftonville	1–1	Crusaders	
1982–83	30 October 1982	Group Stage	Seaview	Crusaders	1–0	Cliftonville	
1994–95	13 August 1994	Group Stage	Seaview	Crusaders	1–0	Cliftonville	
1996–97	4 September 1996	Semi-final	The Oval	Cliftonville	0–4	Crusaders	

- ^{*} Tournament was renamed Festival of Britain Cup for one season
- ^{1} Crusaders originally drawn at home, tie switched to Solitude to allow Seaview pitch to settle after re-turfing

=== City Cup ===
The City Cup was a competition which ran from 1894 to 1976. Like the Ulster Cup, this was a fixture every season, and the sides played each other every season from 1949 until 1976.

Season	Date	Round	Stadium	Home team	Result	Away team	Attendance
1949–50	19 November 1949	Group Stage	Seaview	Crusaders	3–1	Cliftonville	
1950–51	18 November 1950	Group Stage	Solitude	Cliftonville	1–1^{1}	Crusaders	
1951–52	3 November 1951	Group Stage	Seaview	Crusaders	1–2	Cliftonville	
1952–53	25 November 1952	Group Stage	Solitude	Cliftonville	2–1	Crusaders	
1953–54	14 November 1953	Group Stage	Seaview	Crusaders	2–2	Cliftonville	
1954–55	27 November 1954	Group Stage	Solitude	Cliftonville	1–0	Crusaders	
1955–56	26 November 1955	Group Stage	Seaview	Crusaders	0–0	Cliftonville	
1956–57	7 May 1957	Group Stage	Solitude	Cliftonville	3–2	Crusaders	
1957–58	9 November 1957	Group Stage	Seaview	Crusaders	0–1	Cliftonville	
1958–59	8 November 1958	Group Stage	Solitude	Cliftonville	2–3	Crusaders	
1959–60	7 November 1959	Group Stage	Seaview	Crusaders	2–2	Cliftonville	
1960–61	19 November 1960	Group Stage	Solitude	Cliftonville	1–1	Crusaders	
1961–62	18 November 1961	Group Stage	Seaview	Crusaders	3–0	Cliftonville	
1962–63	17 November 1962	Group Stage	Solitude	Cliftonville	3–0	Crusaders	
1963–64	16 November 1963	Group Stage	Seaview	Crusaders	5–0	Cliftonville	
1964–65	14 November 1964	Group Stage	Solitude	Cliftonville	2–1	Crusaders	
1965–66	25 April 1966	Group Stage	Solitude	Cliftonville	1–2	Crusaders	
1966–67	25 April 1967	Group Stage	Seaview	Crusaders	6–1	Cliftonville	
1967–68	6 April 1968	Group Stage	Solitude	Cliftonville	1–3	Crusaders	
1968–69	22 March 1969	Group Stage	Seaview	Crusaders	1–3	Cliftonville	
1969–70	4 October 1969	Group Stage	Solitude	Cliftonville	1–5	Crusaders	
1970–71	24 December 1970	Group Stage	Seaview	Crusaders	2–3	Cliftonville	
1971–72	16 October 1971	Group Stage	Solitude	Cliftonville	0–0	Crusaders	
1972–73	4 November 1972	Group Stage	Seaview	Crusaders	8–0	Cliftonville	
1973–74	3 November 1973	Group Stage	Solitude	Cliftonville	1–4	Crusaders	
1974–75	2 November 1974	Group Stage	Seaview	Crusaders	2–0	Cliftonville	
1975–76	18 October 1975	Group Stage	Solitude	Cliftonville	1–0	Crusaders	

- ^{1} Game abandoned at 1-1 due to heavy rain, result declared complete

=== Belfast Charity Cup ===
The Belfast Charity Cup was a competition which ran from 1883 to 1941, and was based on a similar tournament in Scotland, the Glasgow Merchants Charity Cup. The competition was open to senior sides from Belfast and while Cliftonville could enter every year, Crusaders could only enter this competition by winning an intermediate tournament or by invitation.

Season	Date	Round	Stadium	Home team	Result	Away team	Attendance
1922–23	18 April 1923	First round	Solitude	Cliftonville	0–1	Crusaders	
1925–26	26 April 1926	Quarter-final	Solitude	Cliftonville	1–2	Crusaders	

== Goalscorer records ==
Players with 10 or more goals in the North Belfast derby. Those in bold still with either side.

As of 10 March 2026

Goalscorer	Team(s)	Derby goals span	League	Irish Cup	League Cup	County Antrim Shield	Ulster Cup	Gold Cup	City Cup	Total
Jordan Owens	Crusaders	2008–2022	26	—	—	—	—	—	—	**26**
**Joe Gormley**	Cliftonville	2011–2026	14	5	2	2	—	—	—	**23**
Curry Mulholland	Crusaders	1951–1960	10	—	—	2	4	—	6	**22**
Danny Hale	Cliftonville; Crusaders	1959–1960; 1962–1966	11	—	—	—	4	—	6	**21***
Paul Heatley	Crusaders	2013–2023	15	—	—	3	—	—	—	**18**
Joe Meldrum	Crusaders	1966–1969	8	—	—	—	3	—	5	**16**
Kevin McGarry	Cliftonville	1949–1958	14	—	—	—	—	—	1	**15**
Jim Weatherup	Crusaders	1958–1965	10	—	—	—	1	—	3	**14**
Glenn Hunter	Crusaders	1989–1997	9	3	—	—	1	—	—	**13**
Bobby McQuillan	Crusaders	1972–1975	5	—	—	—	3	—	4	**12**
Paul Kirk	Crusaders	1975–1977	10	—	—	—	2	—	–	**12**
Chris Scannell	Cliftonville	1999–2011	8	—	1	3	—	—	—	**12**
Billy Bradford	Crusaders	1951–1954	3	—	—	—	7	—	1	**11**
Ronnie McAteer	Crusaders	1974–1978	6	—	—	2	1	1	1	**11**
**Ryan Curran**	Cliftonville	2018–2025	9	1	—	1	—	—	—	**11**
John McPolin	Crusaders	1967–1976	4	—	—	3	—	—	3	**10**

- ^{*} Hale scored 18 goals for Crusaders and 3 goals for Cliftonville

== Largest attendances ==
Since the reorganisation of Irish football in 2008 clubs are required to publish attendances. Attendances in the 1960s and 1970s may have been considerably higher.

Season	Date	Competition	Stadium	Attendance
2008–09	9 May 2009	Irish Cup Final	Windsor Park	7,500
2012–13	26 January 2013	Irish League Cup Final	Windsor Park	4,948
2013–14	25 January 2014	Irish League Cup Final	Solitude	4,300
2016–17	26 December 2016	NIFL Premiership	Solitude	3,109
2022–23	26 December 2022	NIFL Premiership	Seaview	3,056
