= 2022–23 Glentoran F.C. season =

Glentoran
2022–23 season
- Chairman: Ian Kerr
- Manager: Mick McDermott
- Stadium: The Oval, Belfast
- Top goalscorer: League: Conor McMenamin (9); All: Conor McMenamin (9)
- Highest home attendance: 6,154 (v. Linfield, 26 December 2022)
- Lowest home attendance: 1,822 (v. Newry City, 3 September 2022)
- Average home league attendance: 3,276
- All statistics correct as of 8 January 2023.

The 2022–23 season is Glentoran's 122nd season in the top flight of the Northern Ireland Football League having never been relegated since the league's formation in 1890. In addition to the domestic league, they will also compete in the Irish Cup, the League Cup and the County Antrim Shield.

== Pre-season and friendlies ==
Glentoran played a total of eight pre-season friendlies including one against Rangers B. Their results are shown in the table below.

Date	Opponents	H/A	Result F-A	Scorers
2 July 2022	Rathfriland Rangers	A	2-0	Jay Donnelly, Jordan Jenkins
10 July 2022	Rangers B	H	6-3	Jay Donnelly 3', Paddy McClean 13', Rory Donnelly 41', Ally Roy 56', Jordan Jenkins 69', Daniel Purkis 82'
15 July 2022	Orangefield Old Boys	A	3-1	Jordan Jenkins, Hrvoje Plum, Seanan Clucas
16 July 2022	Annagh United	H	3-1	Danny Purkis 17', 50', Ally Roy 65'
23 July 2022	Dundela	A	1-1	Aidan Wilson 44'
29 July 2022	H&W Welders	H	2-1	Jay Donnelly 8', 46'
6 August 2022	Loughgall	H	2-1	Sean Murray 43', Danny Purkis 84'

== Competitions ==
=== Overall Record ===
Competition	First Match	Last Match	Starting Round	Final Position	Record							
Competition	First Match	Last Match	Starting Round	Final Position	Pld	W	D	L	GF	GA	GD	Win %
NIFL Premiership	14 August 2022	29 April 2023	Matchday 1		20	11	2	7	33	14	19	55%
NIFL League Cup	13 September 2022	Semi-Final	1st Round	Semi-Final	4	3	0	1	15	3	12	75%
County Antrim Shield	6 September 2022	Semi-Final	1st Round	Semi-Final	3	2	0	1	6	3	3	66%
Irish Cup	7 January 2023		5th Round		1	1	0	1	2	0	2	100%
Total					27	17	2	9	56	21	35	61%

== Transfers ==
=== In ===
Date	Pos.	Name	From	Fee	Ref.
1 July 2022	FW	(Scotland) Ally Roy	Unattached	Free	
1 July 2022	DF	(Scotland) Aidan Wilson	Crusaders F.C.	Free	
1 July 2022	DF	(Northern Ireland) Harry Murphy	Portadown F.C.	Free	
1 July 2022	GK	(Canada) Mike Argyrides	Larne F.C.	Free	
1 July 2022	FW	(Northern Ireland) Danny Purkis	East Belfast F.C.	Free	
1 July 2022	DF	(Northern Ireland) James Singleton	Glenavon F.C.	Undisclosed	
1 July 2022	GK	(Northern Ireland) Oliver Webber	Portsmouth	Free	

=== Out ===
Date	Pos.	Name	To	Fee	Ref.
1 July 2022	GK	(Northern Ireland) Ross Glendinning	Carrick Rangers F.C.	Free	
1 July 2022	MF	(Burkina Faso) Gael Bigirimana	Released	N/A	
1 July 2022	MF	(Republic of Ireland) Dillon Powers	Released	N/A	
1 July 2022	FW	(Northern Ireland) Robbie McDaid	Linfield F.C.	Undisclosed	

=== Out on loan ===
Pos.	Name	On Loan At	Until
GK	(Canada) Mike Argyrides	Harland and Wolff Welders	1 July 2023
DF	(Scotland) Darren Cole	Dungannon Swifts	1 July 2023
MF	(Republic of Ireland) Ciaran O'Connor	Newry City	1 July 2023
FW	(Northern Ireland) Ben Cushnie	Dungannon Swifts	1 July 2023
FW	(Northern Ireland) Jordan Jenkins	Portadown	1 July 2023
