= 2016–17 NIFL Premiership =

NIFL Premiership
- Season: 2016–17
- Dates: 6 August 2016 – 29 April 2017
- Champions: Linfield; 4th Premiership title 52nd Irish title
- Relegated: Portadown
- Champions League: Linfield
- Europa League: Crusaders; Coleraine; Ballymena United (via play-offs)
- Matches: 228
- Goals: 688 (3.02 per match)
- Top goalscorer: Andrew Mitchell (25 goals)
- Biggest home win: Crusaders 6–0 Ballymena United (6 August 2016); Dungannon Swifts 6–0 Portadown (8 October 2016)
- Biggest away win: Portadown 0–5 Linfield (26 November 2016); Portadown 0–5 Glentoran (3 January 2017)
- Highest scoring: Ballymena United 3–4 Ards (20 August 2016); Crusaders 4–3 Cliftonville (1 October 2016); Ballymena United 3–4 Glenavon (3 January 2017); Crusaders 6–1 Glenavon (29 April 2017)
- Highest attendance: 7,504; Linfield 1–1 Glentoran (26 December 2016)
- Lowest attendance: 173; Carrick Rangers 0–3 Dungannon Swifts (24 September 2016)
- Total attendance: 243,738
- Average attendance: 1,074

The 2016–17 NIFL Premiership (known as the Danske Bank Premiership for sponsorship reasons) was the 9th season of the NIFL Premiership, the highest level of league football in Northern Ireland, the 116th season of Irish league football overall, and the 4th season of the league operating as part of the Northern Ireland Football League.

Linfield were champions, winning the league for the 52nd time.

== Summary ==
The fixtures were announced on 7 July 2016. The season began on 6 August 2016 and ended on 29 April 2017, with the play-offs taking place in May 2017.

Crusaders were the two-time defending champions after winning the title for the previous two seasons. On 29 April 2017, Linfield beat Cliftonville 3–1 to win their 52nd league title on the final day of the season.

It was an unlikely title win for Linfield, as after a 1–0 home defeat to Coleraine in January 2017, they sat seven points behind defending champions, Crusaders. A 1–1 draw at home against Portadown on 17 February 2017 meant the gap had grown to nine points with nine games left to play. However, Linfield won all nine of their remaining games, going unbeaten in their last 14 games of the season since the Coleraine defeat, winning 13 of them and drawing the other (the 1–1 draw against Portadown). They picked up 40 out of a possible 42 points to capitalise on Crusaders dropping points, and pipped them to the title on the final day of the season by two points.

Linfield qualified for the 2017–18 UEFA Champions League. The runners-up, Crusaders, along with third-placed Coleraine and the play-off winners, Ballymena United, qualified for the 2017–18 UEFA Europa League.

== Teams ==
Twelve teams competed in the 2016–17 NIFL Premiership. Warrenpoint Town were relegated after finishing bottom of the 2015–16 NIFL Premiership and after a failed appeal against an IFA ruling not to deduct points from Carrick Rangers after their manager incorrectly served a touchline ban. Warrenpoint Town were replaced by Ards as the winners of the 2015–16 NIFL Championship.

Ballinamallard United finished second from bottom but retained their Premiership place after winning the promotion-relegation play-off against NIFL Championship runners-up Institute 5–4 on aggregate. Portadown started this season with a 12-point deduction, after the IFA found the club guilty of breaching the rules by paying Peter McMahon, despite the player being contracted to the club as an amateur. The club appealed against the decision, but this was rejected in October 2016.

=== Stadia and locations ===
Locations of the 2016–17 NIFL Premiership teams
Locations of the Belfast-based 2016–17 NIFL Premiership teams

Club	Stadium	Location	Capacity^{‡}
Ards	Clandeboye Park	Bangor	1,895 (500 seated)
Ballinamallard United	Ferney Park	Ballinamallard	2,000 (250 seated)
Ballymena United	The Showgrounds	Ballymena	3,050 (2,200 seated)
Carrick Rangers	Taylors Avenue	Carrickfergus	4,500 (150 seated)
Cliftonville	Solitude	Belfast	2,530 (all seated)
Coleraine	The Showgrounds	Coleraine	2,496 (1,106 seated)
Crusaders	Seaview	Belfast	3,383 (all seated)
Dungannon Swifts	Stangmore Park	Dungannon	5,000 (300 seated)
Glenavon	Mourneview Park	Lurgan	4,160 (4,000 seated)
Glentoran	The Oval	Belfast	6,054 (4,989 seated)
Linfield	Windsor Park	Belfast	18,614 (all seated)
Portadown	Shamrock Park	Portadown	3,940 (2,765 seated)

== League table ==
Pos	Team	Pld	W	D	L	GF	GA	GD	Pts	Qualification or relegation (Note: Teams played each other three times (33 matches), before the league split into two groups (the top six and the bottom six) for the last five matches.)
1	Linfield (C)	38	27	8	3	87	24	+63	89	Qualification for the Champions League first qualifying round
2	Crusaders	38	27	6	5	83	36	+47	87	Qualification for the Europa League first qualifying round (Note: 2016–17 Irish Cup winners, Linfield, had already qualified for the Champions League as league champions. As a result, a Europa League berth was passed down to third-placed Coleraine.)
3	Coleraine	38	18	11	9	56	42	+14	65	Qualification for the Europa League first qualifying round
4	Ballymena United (O)	38	18	5	15	75	73	+2	59	Qualification for the Europa League play-offs (Note: Ballymena United qualified for the Europa League first qualifying round by winning the Europa League play-offs.)
5	Cliftonville	38	17	7	14	55	50	+5	58	Qualification for the Europa League play-offs
6	Glenavon	38	13	13	12	55	55	0	52	Qualification for the Europa League play-offs
7	Dungannon Swifts	38	14	10	14	67	59	+8	52 (Note: After 33 games, clubs in the bottom half of the table at the split cannot climb into the top half, regardless of the results during matches 34–38.)	Qualification for the Europa League play-offs
8	Ards	38	13	8	17	61	70	−9	47	
9	Glentoran	38	12	10	16	45	53	−8	46	
10	Ballinamallard United	38	10	5	23	45	72	−27	35	
11	Carrick Rangers (O)	38	5	7	26	31	79	−48	22	Qualification for the relegation play-offs
12	Portadown (R)	38	7	4	27	28	75	−47	13 (Note: Portadown were deducted 12 points for a player registration breach.)	Relegation to the NIFL Championship

Source: RSSSF
Rules for classification: 1) Points; 2) Goal difference; 3) Number of goals scored; 4) Head-to-head points; 5) Head-to-head goal difference
(C) Champions; (O) Play-off winners; (R) Relegated

== Results ==
=== Matches 1–22 ===
During matches 1–22 each team played every other team twice (home and away).

Home \ Away	ARD	BMD	BYM	CRK	CLF	COL	CRU	DUN	GLV	GLT	LIN	POR
Ards	—	3–3	2–4	3–1	2–2	1–2	0–1	3–3	0–1	2–0	0–2	1–0
Ballinamallard United	2–1	—	0–1	1–3	1–2	0–3	0–1	2–0	1–1	2–1	1–2	1–2
Ballymena United	3–4	4–0	—	2–0	3–2	2–0	2–1	1–4	3–3	4–1	1–4	2–0
Carrick Rangers	1–1	3–3	1–4	—	0–3	2–0	1–4	0–3	0–0	1–2	0–2	1–1
Cliftonville	2–0	1–0	2–0	1–0	—	1–0	0–4	1–2	3–0	2–0	2–1	1–0
Coleraine	1–1	3–1	2–2	2–0	0–1	—	1–1	2–2	2–2	4–1	1–1	3–0 (Note: Match awarded 3–0 to Coleraine due to Portadown forfeiting the game after they were suspended from all football activity for non-payment of a £5,000 fine.)
Crusaders	1–0	5–1	6–0	3–1	4–3	1–0	—	3–1	3–1	2–2	0–0	2–1
Dungannon Swifts	1–2	3–2	2–2	3–1	1–1	4–0	0–1	—	1–1	0–1	0–4	6–0
Glenavon	1–0	0–1	5–0	4–0	3–2	1–0	3–3	0–1	—	1–1	2–2	1–0
Glentoran	1–0	1–1	2–3	0–1	2–1	0–1	1–3	1–0	2–2	—	1–2	0–0
Linfield	4–0	4–0	2–1	3–0	1–2	1–1	0–0	1–1	4–0	1–1	—	4–1
Portadown	0–3 (Note: Match awarded 3–0 to Ards due to Portadown fielding a suspended player; original result was Portadown 3–1 Ards.)	2–1	0–2	4–0	0–3	0–1	0–1	2–0	3–0 (Note: Match awarded 3–0 to Portadown due to Glenavon fielding a suspended player; original result was 2–2 draw.)	0–1	0–5	—

Source: RSSSF
Legend: Blue = home team win; Yellow = draw; Red = away team win.
For upcoming matches, an "a" indicates there is an article about the rivalry between the two participants.

=== Matches 23–33 ===
During matches 23–33 each team played every other team for the third time (either at home, or away).

Home \ Away	ARD	BMD	BYM	CRK	CLF	COL	CRU	DUN	GLV	GLT	LIN	POR
Ards	—	2–0	4–2	0–4	—	—	2–4	—	1–0	1–3	—	—
Ballinamallard United	—	—	1–2	—	1–0	1–2	—	—	—	—	1–2	1–0
Ballymena United	—	—	—	3–1	—	1–1	—	3–2	3–4	2–4	—	3–0
Carrick Rangers	—	1–2	—	—	—	—	—	0–1	0–0	—	0–2	3–2
Cliftonville	2–1	—	2–1	0–0	—	0–0	—	—	—	1–1	—	3–0
Coleraine	3–1	—	—	2–0	—	—	1–0	2–1	—	2–0	—	4–2
Crusaders	—	3–1	2–1	3–0	1–0	—	—	—	—	—	1–2	—
Dungannon Swifts	3–3	2–2	—	—	2–2	—	1–2	—	—	—	1–4	—
Glenavon	—	3–0	—	—	2–2	1–2	0–1	2–0	—	—	1–2	—
Glentoran	—	0–1	—	1–0	—	—	0–3	2–2	0–0	—	0–1	—
Linfield	5–1	—	2–0	—	2–0	0–1	—	—	—	—	—	1–1
Portadown	0–3	—	—	—	—	—	1–1	0–1	1–2	0–5	—	—

Source: RSSSF
Legend: Blue = home team win; Yellow = draw; Red = away team win.
For upcoming matches, an "a" indicates there is an article about the rivalry between the two participants.

=== Matches 34–38 ===
During matches 34–38 each team played every other team in their half of the table once. As this was the fourth time that teams played each other this season, home sides were chosen so that they will have played each other twice at home and twice away.

==== Section A ====
Home \ Away	BYM	CLF	COL	CRU	GLV	LIN
Ballymena United	—	4–1	—	3–0	—	0–2
Cliftonville	—	—	—	2–3	1–3	1–3
Coleraine	1–1	2–0	—	—	1–1	1–5
Crusaders	—	—	3–2	—	6–1	—
Glenavon	3–0	—	—	—	—	—
Linfield	—	—	—	1–0	3–0	—

Source: RSSSF
Legend: Blue = home team win; Yellow = draw; Red = away team win.
For upcoming matches, an "a" indicates there is an article about the rivalry between the two participants.

==== Section B ====
Home \ Away	ARD	BMD	CRK	DUN	GLT	POR
Ards	—	—	—	4–1	—	3–2
Ballinamallard United	2–3	—	4–1	1–4	3–0	—
Carrick Rangers	2–2	—	—	—	1–2	—
Dungannon Swifts	—	—	4–0	—	2–1	2–0
Glentoran	1–1	—	—	—	—	3–0
Portadown	—	1–0	2–1	—	—	—

Source: RSSSF
Legend: Blue = home team win; Yellow = draw; Red = away team win.

== Play-offs ==
=== UEFA Europa League play-offs ===
Teams finishing fourth to seventh took part in Europa League play-offs to decide which team would qualify for next season's Europa League first qualifying round.

==== Semi-finals ====
8 May 2017
19:45 BST

Ballymena United (4th)	5–2	Dungannon Swifts (7th)
Kane 3', 40'; McKinney 36'; McMurray 70'; Owens 82'	BBC Sport; Soccerway	Lowe 64'; Glackin 74'

The Showgrounds, Ballymena
Referee: Ian McNabb

8 May 2017
19:45 BST

Cliftonville (5th)	3–5	Glenavon (6th)
Winchester 7'; Curran 33'; J. Donnelly 42'	BBC Sport; Soccerway	Marshall 3'; Moorhouse 40'; Singleton 49'; Gray 69'; McGrory 72' (pen.)

Solitude, Belfast
Referee: Tim Marshall

==== Final ====
12 May 2017
19:45 BST

Ballymena United (4th)	2–1	Glenavon (6th)
Friel 53'; Braniff 80'	BBC Sport; Soccerway	Marshall 67'

The Showgrounds, Ballymena
Referee: Arnold Hunter

=== NIFL Premiership play-offs ===
==== Pre-play-off ====
The runners-up and third-placed teams from the Championship, Institute and Ballyclare Comrades respectively, took part (over two legs) in a pre-play-off.

2 May 2017
19:45 BST

Ballyclare Comrades	1–0	Institute
McMullan 81'	Report

Dixon Park, Ballyclare

5 May 2017
19:45 BST

Institute	3–1	Ballyclare Comrades
	Report

YMCA Grounds, Drumahoe

Institute won 3–2 on aggregate.

==== Play-off ====
The eleventh-placed team from the Premiership, Carrick Rangers, played the winners of the pre-play-off, Institute, over two legs for one spot in the 2017–18 NIFL Premiership.

9 May 2017
19:45 BST

Institute	1–1	Carrick Rangers
McCrudden 41'	BBC Sport; Soccerway	Murray 43' (pen.)

YMCA Grounds, Drumahoe
Referee: Lee Tavinder

12 May 2017
19:45 BST

Carrick Rangers	4–1	Institute
McVey 11'; McCullough 25'; O'Brien 71', 80' (pen.)	BBC Sport; Soccerway	Morrow 12'

Taylors Avenue, Carrickfergus

Carrick Rangers won 5–2 on aggregate and retained their spot in the NIFL Premiership for the 2017–18 season; Institute remained in the NIFL Championship.

== Top goalscorers ==
As of 18 April 2017

Rank	Scorer	Club	Goals
1	(Northern Ireland) Andrew Mitchell	Dungannon Swifts	25
2	(Northern Ireland) Paul Heatley	Crusaders	21
3	(Northern Ireland) Andrew Waterworth	Linfield	20
3	(Northern Ireland) Jordan Owens	Crusaders	20
5	(Northern Ireland) Cathair Friel	Ballymena United	17
6	(Northern Ireland) Curtis Allen	Glentoran	16
7	(Northern Ireland) Tony Kane	Ballymena United	14
7	(Northern Ireland) Aaron Burns	Linfield	14
7	(Northern Ireland) Jamie McGonigle	Coleraine	14
10	(Northern Ireland) Johnny McMurray	Ballymena United	12
11	(Northern Ireland) Adam Lecky	Ballinamallard United	11
11	(Northern Ireland) Michael Ruddy	Ards	11
13	(Republic of Ireland) Greg Moorhouse	Glenavon	10
13	(Northern Ireland) Gavin Whyte	Crusaders	10
13	(Northern Ireland) James Mclaughlin	Coleraine	10

== Attendances ==
#	Club	Average
1	Linfield	2,538
2	Glentoran	1,576
3	Crusaders	1,514
4	Cliftonville	1,252
5	Ballymena	1,248
6	Glenavon	1,062
7	Coleraine	910
8	Portadown	844
9	Ards	569
10	Dungannon	517
11	Carrick	490
12	Ballinamallard	445
