= Jay Donnelly =

Northern Irish footballer (born 1995)

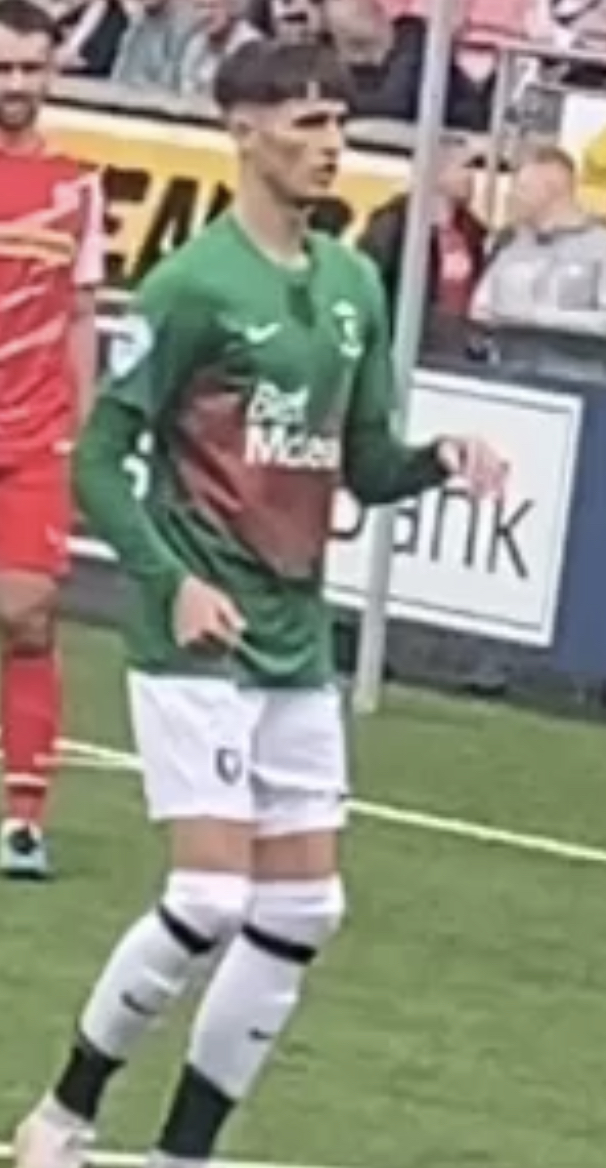
- Donnelly with Glentoran in 2021

Personal information
- Date of birth: 10 April 1995 (age 31)
- Place of birth: Belfast, Northern Ireland
- Position: Forward

Team information
- Current team: Newington

Youth career
- -2014: Cliftonville

Senior career*
Years	Team	Apps	(Gls)
2014–2019	Cliftonville	131	(45)
2020	Belfast Celtic		
2020–2025	Glentoran	143	(64)
2025	→ Newington (loan)	10	(14)
2025-	Newington	22	(10)
- * Club domestic league appearances and goals as of 19 November 2026

Jay Donnelly (born 10 April 1995) is a Northern Irish footballer who plays for NIFL Championship side Newington. He previously played for Cliftonville, Glentoran and had a short spell at Belfast Celtic.

== Club career ==
=== Cliftonville ===
Donnelly netted 15 goals over his first two seasons playing for the first team squad, and was part of the sides that won the League Cup during the 2014–15 and 2015–16 seasons. He became a prolific goalscorer for the Reds, and scored 20 goals in the NIFL Premiership during the 2017–18 season. His brother Rory was his teammate.

=== Prison sentence ===
In January 2019, Donnelly was given a four-month prison sentence for sharing an indecent image of a child. He initially sent the photo in 2016 of him having consensual sex with a 16-year-old girl to a friend and Cliftonville teammates on a WhatsApp group, but the photo began to spread around the internet. The girl was subjected to taunts due to the image, and relationships with friends were affected. He had admitted to the charge in November 2018 and was dropped by Cliftonville before their match against Dungannon Swifts the same week. On 9 April 2019, Donnelly's sentence was reduced to three months.

Cliftonville announced the termination of Donnelly's contract on 11 April 2019.

=== Stint with Belfast Celtic and return to Irish League ===
In January 2020, after becoming eligible to play again, Donnelly signed for Ballymena Intermediate League side Belfast Celtic (not to be confused with the original Belfast Celtic). Belfast Celtic's joint managers defended the decision to sign Donnelly, stating that they "believe in second chances". He scored nine goals in six games.

In September 2020, NIFL Premiership side Glentoran controversially announced the signing of Donnelly. Glentoran defended their decision to sign Donnelly on their website in the transfer announcement, stating that "Glentoran Football club believes that everyone deserves a chance to put mistakes behind them and Jay Donnelly is no different. The club acknowledges that he has both paid and atoned for his past mistakes and deserves the opportunity to rebuild his life and football career. We look forward to him making a positive contribution to the club, and to giving our supporters further reason to see the coming season as one of great opportunity for Glentoran." Former NI international and Premier League footballer Gareth McAuley criticised the move, and compared it to the case of Adam Johnson.

He scored 17 goals in his first season back in the NIFL Premiership. He finished top scorer in the 2021–22 season, with 26 goals. His brother Rory also played for Glentoran.

== Career statistics ==
As of match played 30 December 2024

Appearances and goals by club, season and competition
Club	Season	League			National Cup		League Cup		Europe		Other		Total	
Club	Season	Division	Apps	Goals	Apps	Goals	Apps	Goals	Apps	Goals	Apps	Goals	Apps	Goals
Cliftonville	2014–15	Premiership	18	5	1	0	2	1	0	0	1 (Note: Appearance in the Charity Shield)	0	22	6
Cliftonville	2015–16	Premiership	33	11	2	3	4	3	—		1 (Note: Appearances in European playoffs)	1	40	18
Cliftonville	2016–17	Premiership	28	9	0	0	1	0	4 (Note: Appearances in the UEFA Europa League)	2	1	1	34	12
Cliftonville	2017–18	Premiership	37	16	4	0	3	3	—		2	4	46	23
Cliftonville	2018–19	Premiership	15	4	0	0	1	0	1	0	—		17	4
Cliftonville	Total		131	45	7	3	11	7	5	2	5	6	159	63
Glentoran	2020–21	Premiership	33	17	2	0	0	0	—		—		35	17
Glentoran	2021–22	Premiership	35	25	2	1	2	1	0 (Note: Appearances in the UEFA Europa Conference League)	0	2	2	41	29
Glentoran	2022–23	Premiership	34	12	3	2	2	1	—		2	1	41	16
Glentoran	2023–24	Premiership	23	8	3	0	1	1	2	0	1	0	30	9
Glentoran	2024–25	Premiership	18	2	4	0	2	1	—		—		24	3
Glentoran	Total		143	64	14	3	7	4	2	0	5	3	171	74
Career Total			274	109	21	6	18	11	7	2	10	9	330	137

== Honours ==
Cliftonville

- County Antrim Shield: 2014–15
- Northern Ireland League Cup: 2014–15, 2015–16

Glentoran

- County Antrim Shield: 2024–25
