= Matthew Shevlin =

Northern Irish footballer (born 1998)

Personal information
- Date of birth: 7 December 1998 (age 27)
- Place of birth: Northern Ireland
- Position: Striker

Team information
- Current team: Coleraine
- Number: 9

Senior career*
Years	Team	Apps	(Gls)
2014–2019	Ballymena United	62	(10)
2017	→ Ards (loan)	10	(5)
2019–2020	Linfield	13	(0)
2021–	Coleraine	133	(65)
- * Club domestic league appearances and goals

Matthew Shevlin (born 8 December 1998) is a Northern Irish footballer who plays as a striker for Coleraine.

== Early life ==
Shevlin debuted for Northern Irish side Ballymena United at the age of fifteen and scored.

== College career ==
Shevlin attended Ulster University.

== Club career ==
In 2019, Shevlin signed for Northern Irish side Linfield, helping the club win the league. He was the top scorer of the 2022–23 NIFL Premiership.

== Style of play ==
Shevlin mainly operates as a striker and is known for his speed.

== Personal life ==
Shevlin's father died when he was a teenager.
