= NIFL Premiership =

Association football league in Northern Ireland

- Founded: 2008
- Country: Northern Ireland
- Confederation: UEFA
- Number of clubs: 12
- Level on pyramid: 1
- Relegation to: NIFL Championship
- Domestic cup: Irish Cup
- League cup: NI Football League Cup
- International cup(s): UEFA Champions League; UEFA Conference League
- Current champions: Larne (3rd title)
- Most championships: Linfield (10 titles)
- Most appearances: Jamie Mulgrew (759) (Note: Mulgrew's league games for the 2008–09 season are unavailable.)
- Top scorer: Joe Gormley (215)
- Broadcaster(s): BBC NI (12 live games per season and 50 live games plus highlights via BBC iPlayer); NIFL TV
- Website: nifootballleague.com
- Current: 2026–27 NIFL Premiership

The NIFL Premiership, known as the Sports Direct Premiership for sponsorship purposes but most commonly called the Irish League and sometimes the Irish Premiership, is a professional association football league which operates as the highest division of the Northern Ireland Football League. The NIFL Premiership was established as the IFA Premiership in 2008 under the auspices of the Irish Football Association as the successor to the Irish Premier League, before the Northern Ireland Football League was created for the start of the 2013–14 season. At the end of the season, the champion club is presented with the Gibson Cup.

Larne are the current champions, winning their 3rd Irish League title in the 2025–26 season.

== Origin ==
The current format was introduced for the 2008–09 season after the league system for Northern Ireland was re-organised. The top flight was reduced in size from 16 to 12 clubs, included on the basis not only of their performance in the 2007–08 season, but in the previous two seasons, and other off-the-field criteria. Each applicant club was assessed by an independent panel and awarded points against the following criteria:

- Sporting (maximum 450 points) – based on league placings, Irish Cup, League Cup and European performances in 2005–06, 2006–07 and 2007–08; with points also awarded for running youth teams, women's teams and community development programmes
- Finance (maximum 200 points) – based on solvency, debt management and cash-flow projection
- Infrastructure (maximum 150 points) – based on stadium capacity, changing provisions, sanitary facilities, field of play, floodlighting, existence and standard of control room, first aid room, drug testing room and media facilities
- Personnel (maximum 100 points) – based on qualification and experience of staff
- Business planning (maximum 50 points)
- Attendances (maximum 50 points)

Portadown were the highest-profile casualty of the new system, suffering relegation to the newly formed IFA Championship as a result of submitting their application for inclusion in the Premiership 29 minutes past the deadline for consideration. The Northern Ireland Football League assumed responsibility for the top three divisions of Irish League national football from the IFA in 2014, putting forward plans to improve the scene of football in Northern Ireland. The plans include improving stadiums, status in European competitions, league structure, commercial image of the competitions, as well as spreading out match kick-off times to be more variable and reintroducing previously abandoned competitions for clubs to compete in, such as the Charity Shield, Floodlit Cup, Ulster Cup and Gold Cup.

== League format ==
=== Fixtures ===
Each team plays a total of 38 fixtures during the season. Each team initially plays every other team three times (either twice at home and once away, or once at home and twice away) for a total of 33 fixtures per team. The league then splits into Section A and Section B, the top six teams in Section A playing each other for a fourth and final time to settle championship and European qualification issues, and the bottom six teams in Section B playing each other to settle relegation issues. The post-split fixtures are usually arranged in such a way as to result in the teams in each half playing each other twice at home and twice away. After the split, teams in the top six cannot finish lower than 6th place, and teams in the bottom six cannot finish higher than 7th place, regardless of the results in the final 5 games. The Irish League campaign begins in August and continues until late April or early May. Most fixtures are played on Saturday afternoons, with occasional fixtures on Friday evenings, and some mid-week games, usually on Tuesday or Wednesday evenings. Traditionally, there are Bank Holiday afternoon fixtures on Boxing Day, New Year's Day, and Easter Tuesday.

Three points are awarded for a win, one point for a draw, and none for a loss. Points can be deducted for breaches of rules (e.g. fielding an ineligible player). The teams are first and foremost ranked by number of points, with the winner having the most points. If two or more teams finish level on points, four tiebreakers are used to separate them: highest overall goal difference, most goals scored, most points gained in the head-to-head meetings, and finally, highest goal difference in the head-to-head meetings. In the highly unlikely event that teams are still tied in a key position after these tiebreakers (e.g. determining the league champions, European qualification, relegation, or even second stage group allocation), lots will be drawn by the Management Committee.

=== Promotion and relegation ===
There is no promotion from the Premiership, as it is the highest division of the Irish League system. At the end of the season, the 12th-placed club is relegated to the NIFL Championship and the 11th-placed club must take part in an aggregate two-legged play-off against the winners of the pre-play-off match between the runners-up and third-placed Championship teams. The away goals rule is applied after 90 minutes of the second leg, with extra time and penalties also used to determine the winner in the second leg if necessary. The Premiership club gets home advantage in the second leg, and is relegated to the Championship if it loses the tie. In the event that the Championship winners do not possess the Promotion licence required to be eligible for the top flight, there is no automatic relegation. Instead, the play-off is passed down to the 12th-placed Premiership club and the 11th-placed club is safe from relegation. In the event that there are no Championship clubs eligible for promotion, there is no relegation.

== European qualification ==
European play-off finals
Season	Winners	Score	Runners-up
UEFA Europa League
2015–16	Cliftonville (4th)	3–2	Glentoran (6th)
2016–17	Ballymena United (4th)	2–1	Glenavon (6th)
2017–18	Cliftonville (5th)	3–2	Glentoran (7th)
2018–19	Cliftonville (5th)	2–0 (a.e.t.)	Glentoran (7th)
UEFA Europa Conference League
2020–21	Larne (4th)	3–1	Cliftonville (5th)
2021–22	Larne (5th)	4–2 (a.e.t.)	Glentoran (3rd)
2022–23	Glentoran (3rd)	2–0	Cliftonville (4th)
2023–24	Crusaders (4th)	3–2	Coleraine (6th)
2024–25	Cliftonville (7th)	2–0	Coleraine (5th)
2025–26	Linfield (4th)	3–1	Dungannon Swifts (6th)

Northern Ireland is currently ranked in 42nd place out of 55 in the 2021 UEFA association coefficient rankings, which will be used to determine qualification places for the 2022–23 UEFA competitions. The Irish League’s relatively low ranking over the years has meant that the clubs have entered in the preliminary round or early qualifying rounds of UEFA competitions. No Premiership club has ever reached the group stage of a UEFA competition in their current respective formats. In fact, none have ventured beyond the second qualifying round of the Champions League. The closest any club has come to reaching the group stage was first during the 2019–20 UEFA Europa League, when Linfield became the first club from Northern Ireland to reach the play-off round, narrowly missing out on a place in the group stage after a 4–4 draw on aggregate against Qarabağ FK from Azerbaijan resulted in elimination on the away goals rule. Then, in the 2022–23 UEFA Europa Conference League play-off round, Linfield were beaten on penalties by FK RFS after a 3–3 draw on aggregate.

For the 2021–22 season, the Irish League will earn four berths in the 2022–23 UEFA competitions - three for the Premiership, with the fourth reserved for the Irish Cup winners. The Irish League champions will enter the qualifying rounds for the following season's UEFA Champions League, with the league runners-up and European play-off winners (along with the Irish Cup winners) entering the UEFA Europa Conference League. If, however, the Irish Cup winners have already qualified for Europe as league champions or runners-up, the Irish Cup's Europa Conference League berth is redistributed to the league's third-placed team. In order to compete in UEFA competitions, however, clubs must possess a UEFA licence. In the event that a team qualifies without such a licence, lower-placed teams may take their place. Unlike the English League Cup, the Northern Ireland Football League Cup winners are not awarded a European berth.

A play-off system for the final European qualification berth was introduced for the 2015–16 season. If the Irish Cup winners finish seventh or higher in the league, which historically has been the case in the majority of seasons, the four remaining teams from the top seven that have not already qualified for a UEFA competition (the teams in 3rd–7th, excluding either the Irish Cup winners, or the third-placed team if they are awarded the berth as explained above) compete in a series of play-offs for the final European place. If, however, the Irish Cup winners finish outside the top seven in the Premiership or play in a lower division, and if they also possess a UEFA licence, all five teams finishing 3rd–7th qualify for the play-offs. This would require an additional quarter-final match to be played by the sixth and seventh-placed teams, with the winner joining the other three clubs in the semi-finals. The play-offs did not take place during the 2019–20 season, as the league's UEFA ranking fell to 52nd. This meant that it lost the European berth normally awarded to the play-off winners. The play-offs returned in the 2020–21 season, after the league's ranking improved to 48th place - earning the fourth European berth back again.

The play-offs are single knockout matches and are played at the home of the higher-ranked team, with extra time used to determine the winner if the match ends level after 90 minutes, and a penalty shootout to follow if the two teams are still level after 120 minutes. Seeding is used during all rounds to reward the higher-placed qualifiers, with the sixth-placed team given home advantage against the seventh-placed team in the quarter-final match if it is required. The two higher-ranked semi-finalists are then given home advantage when facing the two lower-ranked semi-finalists, and the higher-ranked finalist is again given home advantage against the lower-ranked finalist.

Since the 2016–17 season, the league champions and the runners-up have been invited to participate in the Scottish Challenge Cup. Starting from 2019, the reigning champions have also faced the League of Ireland champions in that year's Champions Cup – the first all-Ireland competition since the Setanta Sports Cup was discontinued after the 2014 edition.

== Media coverage ==
On 26 December 2025, the Northern Ireland Football League launched its owned-and-operated OTT platform NIFL TV, with Motto serving as the platform provider.

Highlights of individual Premiership matches are available online via the BBC Sport website. BBC NI also produces The Irish League Show, a weekly highlights show available to watch via BBC iPlayer. Since September 2007 Sky Sports have been broadcasting NIFL Premiership games live.

== Managers ==
Current NIFL Premiership managers
Manager	Nationality	Club	Appointed	Time as manager
David Healy	Northern Ireland	Linfield	14 October 2015	11 years, 5 days
Lee Feeney	Northern Ireland	Bangor	1 June 2020	6 years, 140 days
Paul Owens	Northern Ireland	Limavady United	21 November 2022	3 years, 332 days
Rodney McAree	Northern Ireland	Dungannon Swifts	5 June 2023	3 years, 136 days
Jim Magilton	Northern Ireland	Cliftonville	6 June 2023	3 years, 135 days
Duncan Ferguson	Scotland	Glentoran	19 October 2026	0 days
Declan Caddell	Northern Ireland	Crusaders	7 May 2024	2 years, 165 days
Stephen Baxter	Northern Ireland	Carrick Rangers	7 October 2024	2 years, 12 days
Ruaidhri Higgins	Northern Ireland	Coleraine	2 May 2025	1 year, 170 days
Gary Haveron	Northern Ireland	Larne	15 October 2025	1 year, 4 days
Oran Kearney	Northern Ireland	Ballymena United	7 December 2025	316 days
David Jeffrey	Northern Ireland	Portadown	26 April 2026	176 days

== Statistics ==
These statistics cover the Premiership from 2008 onwards. For more detailed statistics covering the Irish League since 1890, see Northern Ireland Football League

=== Champions ===
No.	Season	Champion
1	2008–09	Glentoran
2	2009–10	Linfield
3	2010–11	Linfield
4	2011–12	Linfield
5	2012–13	Cliftonville
6	2013–14	Cliftonville
7	2014–15	Crusaders
8	2015–16	Crusaders
9	2016–17	Linfield
10	2017–18	Crusaders
11	2018–19	Linfield
12	2019–20	Linfield (Note: Linfield declared champions on average points per game, after the season was curtailed as a result of the COVID-19 pandemic.)
13	2020–21	Linfield
14	2021–22	Linfield
15	2022–23	Larne
16	2023–24	Larne
17	2024–25	Linfield
18	2025–26	Larne

==== Wins by club ====
Club	Wins	Winning years
Linfield	9	2009–10, 2010–11, 2011–12, 2016–17, 2018–19, 2019–20, 2020–21, 2021–22, 2024–25
Crusaders	3	2014–15, 2015–16, 2017–18
Larne	3	2022–23, 2023–24, 2025–26
Cliftonville	2	2012–13, 2013–14
Glentoran	1	2008–09

=== Records ===
- Most titles: 9, Linfield
- Most consecutive titles: 4, Linfield (2018–19 to 2021–22)
- Most points in a season: 91, joint record:
  - Crusaders (twice; 2015–16 & 2017–18)
  - Cliftonville (2012–13)
- Fewest points in a season: 13, Portadown (2016–17) (Note: Portadown earned 25 points, but were deducted 12 points for a player registration breach.)
- Highest non-title-winning points total: 89, Coleraine (2017–18)
- Lowest title-winning points total: 74, Linfield (2009–10) (Note: Record was beaten during the 2019–20 season. However, as the season was curtailed after 31 games due to the COVID-19 pandemic in Northern Ireland this has been excluded for consistency, as the records are based over 38 games.)
- Most wins in a season: 29, Cliftonville (2012–13)
- Fewest wins in a season: 4, joint record:
  - Lisburn Distillery (2012–13)
  - Institute (2014–15)
  - Dungannon Swifts (2020–21)
- Most draws in a season: 14, joint record:
  - Cliftonville (2008–09)
  - Crusaders (2008–09)
  - Coleraine (2012–13)

- Fewest draws in a season: 2, Dungannon Swifts (2021–22)
- Most losses in a season: 29, joint record:
  - Dungannon Swifts (2020–21)
  - Warrenpoint Town (2021–22)
- Fewest losses in a season: 1, Coleraine (2017–18)
- Most goals scored in a season: 106, Crusaders (2017–18)
- Fewest goals scored in a season: 22, Dungannon Swifts (2020–21)
- Most goals conceded in a season: 92, Carrick Rangers (2020–21)
- Fewest goals conceded in a season: 21, Larne (2023–24)
- Highest goal difference in a season: +68, Crusaders (2017–18)
- Lowest goal difference in a season: –61, joint record:
  - Lisburn Distillery (2012–13)
  - Dungannon Swifts (2020–21)
- Biggest home winning margin: 11 goals, Portadown 11–0 Ballinamallard United (7 September 2013)
- Biggest away winning margin: 8 goals, Ballymena United 0–8 Cliftonville (17 November 2012)
- Most goals scored in a game: 11 goals, Portadown 11–0 Ballinamallard United (7 September 2013)
- Highest scoring draw: 10 goals, Portadown 5–5 Ballymena United (17 January 2015)

== Premiership clubs ==
Club	Stadium	Location	Capacity	Finishing position in 2024-25
Ballymena United	Ballymena Showgrounds	Ballymena	3,600	9th
Bangor	Clandeboye Park	Bangor	1,895	1st (Promoted from NIFL Championship)
Carrick Rangers	Loughshore Hotel Arena	Carrickfergus	1,500	11th
Cliftonville	Solitude	Belfast	3,200	7th
Coleraine	The Showgrounds	Coleraine	4,843	6th
Crusaders	Seaview	Belfast	3,383	5th
Dungannon Swifts	Stangmore Park	Dungannon	1,500	4th
Glenavon	Mourneview Park	Lurgan	4,160	10th
Glentoran	The Oval	Belfast	6,050	3rd
Larne	Inver Park	Larne	3,250	2nd
Linfield	Windsor Park	Belfast	18,614	1st (League winners)
Portadown	Shamrock Park	Portadown	2,770	8th

== See also ==
- Northern Ireland Football League
- Northern Irish football clubs in European competitions
- Northern Ireland football league system
- Irish League XI
- List of association football competitions
