= Conor McMenamin =

Northern Irish footballer (born 1995)

Personal information
- Date of birth: 24 August 1995 (age 31)
- Place of birth: Downpatrick, Northern Ireland
- Height: 1.83 m (6 ft 0 in)
- Position: Forward

Team information
- Current team: Glentoran
- Number: 24

Senior career*
Years	Team	Apps	(Gls)
2013–2015	Linfield	7	(0)
2014–2015	→ Loughgall (loan)		
2015–2016	Glentoran	17	(1)
2016–2018	Warrenpoint Town	29	(6)
2018–2021	Cliftonville	65	(22)
2021–2023	Glentoran	80	(39)
2023–2026	St Mirren	64	(6)
2026	Coleraine	3	(0)
2026–	Glentoran	1	(0)

International career^{‡}
2022–	Northern Ireland	9	(1)
- * Club domestic league appearances and goals as of 20 May 2026 ‡ National team caps and goals as of 15:52, 14 October 2023 (UTC)

Conor McMenamin (born 24 August 1995) is a Northern Irish professional footballer who plays for NIFL club Glentoran and the Northern Ireland national team.

== Club career ==
McMenamin began his career in the Irish Premiership at Linfield, before moving to Glentoran in 2015. He spent one season at Glentoran before joining Warrenpoint Town.

In 2018, he joined Cliftonville. On 26 December 2019, he scored both goals in a 2–1 North Belfast Derby win over Crusaders at Seaview. In January 2021, McMenamin returned to Glentoran.

On 6 July 2023, McMenamin joined Scottish Premiership club St Mirren on a two-year deal for an undisclosed fee.

== International career ==
McMenamin made his international debut for Northern Ireland on 5 June 2022 against Cyprus in the UEFA Nations League.

== Career statistics ==
Scores and results list Northern Ireland's goal tally first, score column indicates score after each McMenamin goal.

List of international goals scored by Conor McMenamin
No.	Date	Venue	Cap	Opponent	Score	Result	Competition
1	14 October 2023	Windsor Park, Belfast, Northern Ireland	9	San Marino	3–0	3–0	UEFA Euro 2024 qualification

== Honours ==
Linfield

- County Antrim Shield: 2013–14

Glentoran

- NIFL Charity Shield: 2015

Warrenpoint Town

- NIFL Championship: 2016–17

Cliftonville

- County Antrim Shield: 2019–20

St Mirren

- Scottish League Cup: 2025–26
