= 1966–67 Irish League =

Football tournament edition

Irish League
- Season: 1966–67
- Champions: Glentoran; 12th Irish title
- Matches played: 132
- Goals scored: 593 (4.49 per match)
- Top goalscorer: Sammy Pavis (25 goals)

Location of teams in the Irish League from 1949–1972
Location of Belfast-based teams in the Irish League from 1949–1971

The 1966–67 Irish League was the 66th edition of the Irish League, the highest level of league competition in Northern Irish football. The league consisted of 12 teams, and Glentoran won the championship.

== League standings ==
Pos	Team	Pld	W	D	L	GF	GA	GR	Pts	Qualification
1	Glentoran (C)	22	14	6	2	67	35	1.914	34	Qualification for the European Cup first round
2	Linfield	22	14	5	3	70	37	1.892	33	
3	Derry City	22	11	5	6	51	42	1.214	27	
4	Coleraine	22	10	5	7	53	42	1.262	25	
5	Crusaders	22	11	2	9	63	60	1.050	24	Qualification for the European Cup Winners' Cup first round
6	Glenavon	22	9	5	8	50	39	1.282	23	
7	Ballymena United	22	9	5	8	54	45	1.200	23	
8	Ards	22	7	7	8	37	38	0.974	21	
9	Portadown	22	8	4	10	46	48	0.958	20	
10	Distillery	22	6	5	11	44	53	0.830	17	
11	Bangor	22	3	3	16	35	95	0.368	9	
12	Cliftonville	22	2	4	16	23	59	0.390	8	

Source: rsssf.com
(C) Champions

== Results ==
Home \ Away	ARD	BAN	BLM	CLI	COL	CRU	DIS	DER	GLV	GLT	LIN	POR
Ards		2–2	1–2	3–1	1–0	3–1	3–0	2–3	1–1	1–3	1–1	3–3
Bangor	1–4		0–2	3–1	4–3	0–5	0–11	1–2	1–4	2–4	1–3	5–2
Ballymena United	1–1	5–1		2–1	4–4	7–3	4–0	1–2	2–0	2–3	2–4	4–1
Cliftonville	0–1	3–2	1–1		1–1	0–0	2–2	0–2	0–2	2–5	2–4	1–0
Coleraine	4–2	4–1	1–2	2–0		3–2	2–2	1–0	4–1	1–2	0–3	2–2
Crusaders	3–1	5–1	4–3	3–2	1–6		3–1	6–3	2–1	1–3	4–4	2–1
Distillery	1–1	8–3	1–1	3–2	2–5	3–1		1–1	0–5	2–4	1–4	0–2
Derry City	0–2	4–4	2–1	4–0	4–1	9–4	0–2		2–2	1–0	5–2	1–1
Glenavon	2–0	10–0	4–4	3–1	2–2	2–5	0–1	0–1		1–2	2–1	3–2
Glentoran	2–2	6–0	5–2	5–0	2–3	3–2	2–0	4–4	2–2		2–2	2–2
Linfield	6–2	2–2	2–1	7–2	4–2	2–0	5–1	4–1	2–3	1–1		4–1
Portadown	1–0	5–1	4–1	4–1	0–2	2–6	3–2	3–0	4–0	2–5	1–3	

Source: Irish League Archive
Legend: Blue = home team win; Yellow = draw; Red = away team win.
