= Taylors Avenue =

Association football stadium in Carrickfergus, County Antrim, Northern Ireland

Coordinates: 54°43′11″N 5°48′1″W

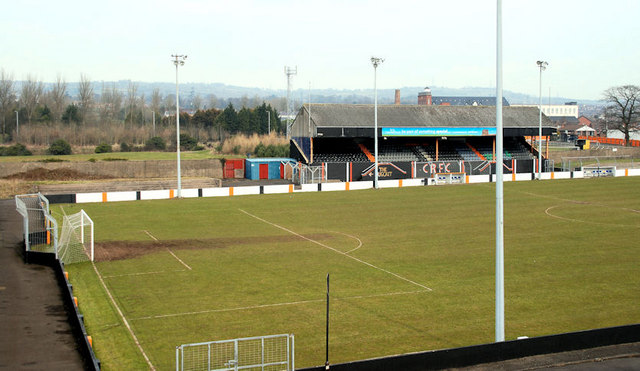
- Interactive map of Taylors Avenue
- Full name: Taylors Avenue
- Location: Carrickfergus, Northern Ireland
- Owner: Mid and East Antrim Borough Council
- Surface: Grass

Tenant
- Carrick Rangers F.C.

Taylors Avenue is a football stadium in Carrickfergus, County Antrim, Northern Ireland. It is the home stadium of local football team Carrick Rangers F.C., but owned by Mid and East Antrim Borough Council. Taylors Avenue has a capacity of 6,000. There are two covered stands, with the rest of the ground made up of open terracing.

== History ==
The ground, known before 1952 as the Barn Field, was the home of Barn F.C. from 1889 until the club folded in 1928. Taylors Avenue was originally founded as Barn Avenue where it was owned by James Taylor who owned the land as part of his converted barn estate. He set aside the land for the nearby Barn Mills National School to host sports events.

In 2011, Carrick Rangers earned promotion to the IFA Premiership for the first time. However, Taylors Avenue did not meet Irish Football Association standards. Work to get the ground up to standards started with the aim of allowing Carrick Rangers to play their at least part of the season. In the meantime, they groundshared with Crusaders at their Seaview ground in Belfast for the whole season. They had to do this again in 2016 following flooding at Taylors Avenue. It was originally planned that the redevelopment would include a 3G pitch, however following subsidence issues discovered during construction a natural grass pitch was retained.

In 2015, Carrick Rangers agreed a naming rights deal for Taylors Avenue after a local hotel. In 2019, Mid and East Antrim Borough Council awarded Taylors Avenue £69,000 from SportNI for ground improvements. They also received £13,000 as part of the Department for Communities' Access & Inclusion Programme in order to improve the toilets.
