= Ballymena Showgrounds =

Football stadium in Northern Ireland

Coordinates: 54.87010°N 6.26507°W

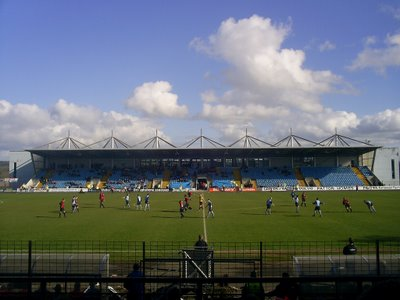
- Interactive map of Ballymena Showgrounds
- Location: Ballymena, Northern Ireland
- Owner: Mid and East Antrim Borough Council
- Capacity: 4,100 (Safe capacity: 3,600)
- Surface: Grass pitch

Construction
- Opened: 1903
- Renovated: 2010

Tenants
- Ballymena United F.C. Ballymena United Women F.C.

The Ballymena Showgrounds is a football stadium in Ballymena, County Antrim, Northern Ireland. It is home to Ballymena United F.C. and Ballymena United Women F.C. It is owned by Mid and East Antrim Borough Council. In addition to men's football a variety of other sports and events are held at the stadium and surrounding facilities, including women's association football, field hockey, and, formerly, stock car racing.

The stadium was redeveloped in 2001 at a cost of £30m. This reconstruction included the building of a new stand and new dressing room facilities. In 2010 the Warden Street stand was redeveloped to all-seater standard with a new capacity of 2,200 seats. The stadium now holds 4,100 spectators, but is limited to 3,600 due to health and safety.

== Main stadium ==
The main pitch is home to Ballymena United.

=== New Stand ===
The New Stand replaced the old 'Clock Stand' which ran parallel to the side of the pitch and was knocked down in 2001, in preparation for the new construction. The stand incorporates approximately sixteen changing rooms, offices and bars - as well as press and corporate facilities.

The first game it was open to the public was an Ulster Cup tie against Carrick Rangers in August 2002; however was officially unveiled a month later with a "glamour" friendly with Bolton Wanderers.

Home supporters are situated in this stand, as they use the turnstiles at the social club to enter the ground.

The stand cost £3million pounds to build, and as yet has not been officially named despite prolonged debate by the council who have proposed selling the naming rights to local businesses, although the fans thoughts that the 'New Stand' should be renamed 'The Norman McBurney Stand' after the Ballymena born owner of haulage company McBurney Transport.

=== Warden Street Stand ===
It cost £250,000 to construct and was used for the first time in a 2–0 defeat in a Tyler Cup game against Shamrock Rovers in July, 1980.

The stand, which is now used to hold visiting supporters has a seating capacity of just over 1,200. The stand was used to house the home supporters until the opening of the new grandstand in 2002.

In front of the stand is terracing which can hold around 2,000 standing spectators. The dug-outs also sit in front of this stand.

It was revealed that the stand would be completely refurbished to bring its seating capacity up to 2,200. This work was due to commence on 14 January 2010, with the terracing due to be removed and replaced by seating. The roof was also planned to replaced and the seats replaced. This work was completed and the new stand was first used in a 3–1 home victory for Ballymena United F.C over Portadown F.C on 16 October 2010.

== Security tower ==
With aid of grants from the Sports Council, Ballymena United have erected a security control tower which will be used by the police and United stewards to monitor behaviour at the Showgrounds.

== Other pitches ==
Other pitches at the ground include:

- Pitch 2 - A "3G" surface.
- Pitch Three - Home to Northend United Youth FC.
- Pitch 6 - Home to Carniny Amateur and Youth FC Football Development Centre This pitch is also home to the Ballymena United FC Youth Academy Football Development Centre
- Pitch 7 - Home to Carniny Youth FC NIBFA National League Teams and Carniny Amateurs II, Ballymena and Provincial Junior Div 2 team.

== Stock car racing ==
Up until 2019 Stock car racing was run at Ballymena on select Friday evenings from Good Friday until the end of September, with many Championship races taking place throughout the season including hosting the ORCi Stock Rod Championship of the World on multiple occasions.

Racing at the track was originally promoted by hot rod driver Ernie Kilpatrick and Robert Mathers in 1977. At that time it was the third stock car track in Northern Ireland, the other two being Aghadowey Oval and Shamrock Park in Portadown. In 2007 the Raceway celebrated its 30th anniversary which featured a celebratory race meeting featuring many famous retired drivers, along with guest drivers from other forms of motorsport, most notably FIA World Rally Championship driver Kris Meeke who tried his hand at racing a National Hot Rod.

In 2019 racing at the venue ceased due to dwindling attendance and complaints from the football club about damage to the pitch caused by racing.

Beginning in mid 2025 there has been an effort to restart racing at the venue, but so far this has been unsuccessful with reasons given ranging from concern over potential damage to the football pitch to the safety concerns over the wall which slopes downward at its base meaning that cars tended to ride up it and potentially roll over.
