= Shamrock Park =

Football stadium in Portadown, Northern Ireland

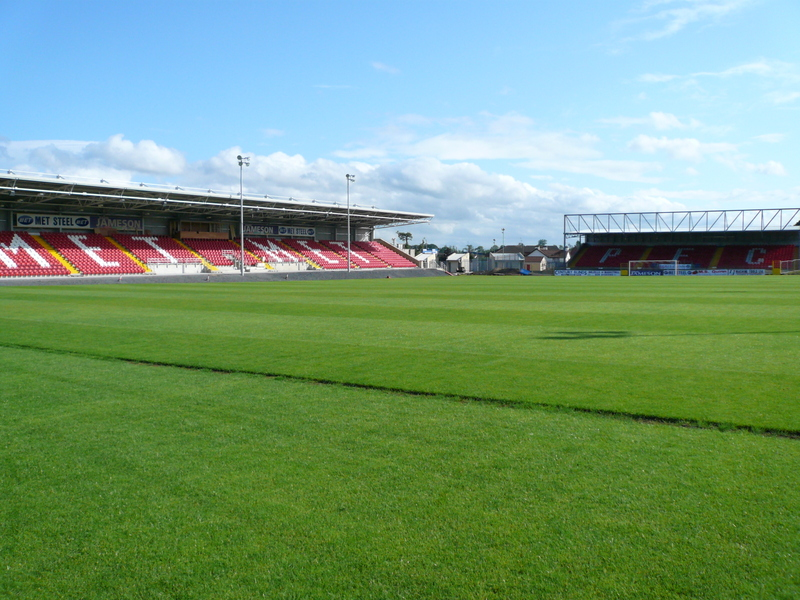
- The main home stand (left) and the Chalet end stand (far end)
- Interactive map of Shamrock Park
- Location: Brownstown Road, Portadown, County Armagh, Northern Ireland
- Coordinates: 54°24′47″N 6°27′28″W
- Owner: Portadown Football Club
- Capacity: 2,770
- Surface: Grass
- Record attendance: 16,000 Vs Manchester City

Tenant
- Portadown Football Club

Shamrock Park, known as British Supplements Shamrock Park for sponsorship reasons, is a football stadium in Portadown, County Armagh, Northern Ireland. It is the home ground of Portadown F.C. Shamrock Park was previously used for stock-car racing, but this has since been discontinued. The stadium is classed as an all-seater stadium but has only two seated stands around the pitch totaling 2,770 seats, with one side containing a training pitch and the other having an older seated stand which is no longer in use. When grant aid is available, the older stand will be demolished and replaced with a brand new seated stand.

== Ground redevelopment ==
A £1.8-million 1,840-seater stand was built at the unreserved end of the ground, replacing the "shed" and opened in late 2008. It was named "The MET Steel Stand" after Portadown's long-serving sponsors. At the same time, the pitch was moved closer to the Chalet end of the stadium allowing supporters from every angle to have a better view of the football. In early February 2009 the old floodlights were replaced with new 800 lux floodlights at each corner of the pitch.

== Stadium naming rights deal ==
In 2026, the club announced a four-year stadium naming rights partnership with British Supplements, a health and wellness company owned by former player, Chris Boyle.

== International matches ==
Due to the extensive redevelopment of the stadium, the Irish Football Association has recognised that Shamrock Park is a venue that can be used for under-age Northern Ireland matches. Shamrock Park was chosen for the under-21 friendly between Northern Ireland and Ukraine on 31 March 2009.

On 24 November 2009 Shamrock Park staged its second international fixture, an under-23 match between Northern Ireland and Wales in the International Challenge Trophy.

In April 2014 the Sweden women's national football team beat Northern Ireland 4–0 at Shamrock Park. Swedish team manager Marika Domanski-Lyfors ridiculed the sloping pitch and inadequate facilities, saying they were wholly unfit for international matches and like a return to the 1980s.
