= Seaview (football ground) =

Football stadium in Belfast, Northern Ireland

Coordinates: 54°37′27″N 5°55′19″W

Seaview Stadium
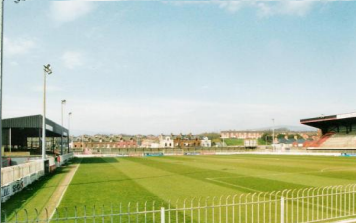
- Seaview Stadium
- Interactive map of Seaview Stadium
- Location: Belfast, Northern Ireland
- Operator: Crusaders
- Capacity: 3,383
- Field size: 108 yd × 72 yd (99 m × 66 m)

Tenants
- Crusaders; Northern Ireland Women

Seaview is a football stadium in Belfast, Northern Ireland. It is the home ground of Crusaders, and traditionally hosts the final of the Steel & Sons Cup on Christmas Day. The stadium holds 3,383, and has a 4G playing surface.

Seaview has undergone considerable redevelopment in recent seasons, with new changing rooms, dug-outs and main-stand seats being installed. Three new stands at either end of the ground and on its southern side were opened in July 2011 to replace the previous terracing.

== Location and access ==
Seaview was opened in 1921 as the home venue of Crusaders Football Club and is located on the Shore Road, approximately one mile north of Belfast city centre. The ground is flanked by the Shore Road behind one goal and the Belfast-to-Larne railway behind the other. The main entrance to the ground is on St Vincent Street while the opposite side of the ground backs on to a goods warehouse yard from a side street off the Shore Road.

In addition to hosting Crusaders, the ground is the traditional venue for the Christmas Day final of the Steel & Sons Cup, an intermediate competition organised by the County Antrim & District F.A.

== Facilities ==
=== St Vincent Street stand and club offices and social club ===
The main entrance to Seaview is from its St Vincent Street side and is made up of two distinct structures, the club offices and social club and a covered (partly uncovered) stand which was converted from a terrace to a seated stand in July 2011 and was officially opened on the day of the visit of Fulham F.C. in a UEFA Europa League tie.

The partially covered stand runs halfway along the side of the ground from the Shore Road/St Vincent Street corner and in June 2011 was converted from a terrace to an all-seated stand for 1,100 spectators. The stand can be accessed from two new turnstiles on the Shore Road or from entrances on St Vincent Street, located at either side of the social club.

The two-tier club offices and social club were opened in 1970 after a fire destroyed the club's previous office location two years earlier. The main entrance to the ground floor is on St Vincent Street and leads directly into the club members' bar, which has a big-screen TV and fruit machines. The remainder of the ground floor is used for the club offices and board room and was formerly where the dressing rooms were located.

The first floor is largely made up of the main club function room, which has two bars, a dance-floor and big-screen TV and also serves meals on matchdays.

The club has recently submitted plans to build a new 1,246 all-seater stand with provision for offices, changing rooms and car-parking.

=== Main stand ===
The main stand is situated on the opposite side of the ground from the club offices and is a single-tier structure, covering half the length of the field, straddling the halfway line. There is also a small section of open terracing on one side and a small access space with gates and two entrances on its other side. The entrances are rarely, if ever, used and access is normally made from St Vincent Street, via the railway end of the ground.

The original main stand was built in the early 1950s and was flanked by open terracing on both sides, but both the stand and terracing on one side was demolished in the early 1970s to make way for the current elevated single-tier stand. Originally, the stand was laid out with bench seating until the early 21st century when one section was laid out in red plastic seats with the letter C spelled out in white. This looked like the beginning of a plan to lay the entire stand out in the same style spelling out the word "Crues", but financial problems stalled the redevelopment with the completed section restyled as a family enclosure. The entire stand was converted to red seating in 2009, and the stand now spells out the name of the pitch sponsor, TAL, in white.

Although the stand is a single tier, it is elevated from the ground and is accessed by two staircases at either end while a third staircase in the middle is closed on matchdays. This is due to the lower concourse being redeveloped in 2009 as the technical area while new dressing rooms were built in the space under the stands. The stand seats 850 spectators

A small section of open terrace, which can accommodate fifty spectators remains from the original development of the ground in the 1940s and a small club shop is also located here.

=== Railway End ===
The Railway End is so called due to it backing directly onto the Belfast-Larne railway line.

The small uncovered terrace was laid to steps in the early 1950s but The need for development was highlighted in the mid-2000s when the perimeter exterior wall partially collapsed in a storm.

A small elevated viewing lounge for VIPs and invited guests of the club, with a small tuck shop located underneath, once stood at the end of the terrace but this was demolished in May 2011 as part of a major redevelopment of the ground that saw a new 650 all-seated stand erected. New turnstiles were also put in place from the St Vincent Street entrance and a disabled section was added. This too was opened on the night of the Fulham game.

There is also a burger bar regularly located in the concourse before the stand.

=== Shore Road End ===
Like the Railway End, the Shore Road End stood for over half a century as a shallow open terrace, which, for safety reasons had been reduced to a capacity of a few hundred. This end too was badly in need of redevelopment and was converted into a brand new stand that was part of the redevelopment of the ground. The new covered stand was also opened for the Fulham game, housing 633 spectators including eight disabled spaces.

== Artificial 3G pitch ==
In 2009 Crusaders installed a 3G artificial pitch, the first in the Irish League.
