= Fay Coyle =

Northern Irish footballer

Personal information
- Date of birth: 1 April 1933
- Place of birth: Derry, Northern Ireland
- Date of death: 30 March 2007 (aged 73)
- Place of death: Derry, Northern Ireland
- Position: Striker

Senior career*
Years	Team	Apps	(Gls)
1951–1953	Derry City	10	(9)
1953–1958	Coleraine	91	(68)
1958	Nottingham Forest	3	(0)
1958–1963	Coleraine	83	(53)
1963–1966	Derry City	57	(44)
Total		244	(174)

International career
1955–1958	Northern Ireland	4	(0)
- * Club domestic league appearances and goals

Francis Coyle (1 April 1933 – 30 March 2007) was a Northern Ireland international footballer from Derry, Northern Ireland.

== Club career ==
A centre-forward, Fay Coyle began his career at Derry City in the Irish League before starring with Coleraine for a number of years.

At the age of 18, he joined Derry City Reserves, and after some excellent displays, he made his senior debut in the 1952–53 season against Ards. On 25 November 1953 Coyle transferred to Coleraine F.C. His best was perhaps the 1954–55 season when he top-scored in the Irish League with 20 goals and won a City Cup winner's medal.

In Matt Doherty Sr.'s benefit game on 4 May 1955 against Shamrock Rovers he scored all 6 goals in a 6–1 win. After the game, Rovers' legend Paddy Coad described Fay as the 'greatest prospect in Irish football'.

Finally, after years of trying, Nottingham Forest prised Coyle away from Coleraine in March 1958. He played just three times for Forest, but never at the City Ground, before returning homesick to Coleraine in the summer of 1958.

Back in the Irish League, Coyle added to his collection of North-West Senior Cup medals as Coleraine defeated his old and first club, Derry City, in the 1959 and 1960 finals. On 26 September 1963 he returned to his hometown club in Derry and captained them to the most successful period in their Irish League history. In 1964 he led them to an Irish Cup final victory over Glentoran, and consequently into Europe for the first time in their history. The next season Derry claimed their only Irish League title, adding the Gold Cup for good measure.

== International career ==
On 12 September 1953 Coyle won his first amateur international against England in Coleraine. Fittingly he scored the winning goal as the home side won 2–1. Coyle's performances in the Irish League during the 1954–55 season brought him to the attentions of Peter Doherty and the Northern Ireland national football team international selectors seeking a solution to their perennial search for a reliable goalscorer. He made his debut in a 2–1 home nations victory over Scotland, and retained his place for the following month's defeat by England.

Doherty awarded Coyle a place in the squad for the 1958 World Cup in Sweden. Northern Ireland's on-going centre-forward problem continued due to an injury to Billy Simpson in the run-up to tournament, and Coyle was given a chance against Argentina. The game ended in a 3–1 defeat, in what turned out to be Coyle's last cap.

== Retirement ==
Coyle also had the honour of seeing his son, Liam, emerge as a leading light in the club's resurgence in the League of Ireland. Coyle was given a Hall of Fame award at the 1997 FAI Cup final alongside Peter Keely. Fay Coyle died two days before his 74th birthday in 2007.

== Honours ==
Derry City

- Irish League: 1964–65
- Irish Cup: 1963–64
- Gold Cup: 1963–64
- Top Four Cup: 1965–66
- North West Senior Cup: 1963–64, 1965–66

Coleraine

- Gold Cup: 1957–58
- City Cup: 1953–54
- North West Senior Cup: 1954–55, 1955–56, 1957–58, 1960–61
