= Matt Doherty (footballer, born 1916) =

Northern Ireland footballer (1916–1979)

Matt Doherty Sr. (1916 – 23 January 1979) was a Northern Irish professional footballer and manager of Derry City.

== Career ==
Doherty, a dynamic half-back celebrated for his nimble footwork and precise passing, emerged as one of Derry City's early luminaries. His tenure at the Brandywell saw him clinch coveted winner's medals in both the City Cup and North-West Cup. Notably, he graced the pitch in Derry's valiant but ultimately unsuccessful 0–2 bout against Linfield in the 1935–36 Irish Cup final. In a near-miss bid for glory in 1937–38, Doherty nearly steered the club to their maiden league title, only to succumb to Belfast Celtic in a hard-fought 1–3 defeat in a crucial title-deciding rematch.

The 1937–38 season stood as a pinnacle in Doherty's career, earning him selection for both Ireland and the Irish League XI. His talents drew the attention of Burnley, who made a substantial £1,000 offer in September 1937, narrowly avoided due to Derry's refusal. However, in 1941, he bid farewell to the Brandywell, embarking on a new chapter with Shamrock Rovers in the League of Ireland, in which he featured in three League of Ireland XI matches while at Glenmalure Park. Despite his departure, Doherty returned to Derry following World War II, ultimately clinching victory in the 1948–49 Irish Cup against Glentoran.

Beyond his prowess on the field, Doherty briefly assumed managerial duties for the club from late 1959 to the culmination of the 1960–61 Irish League season. Notably, he passed on his footballing legacy to his son, Matt Doherty Jr. (1940–16 July 2019), who later donned the jersey for Derry City.

== Honours ==
- Irish Cup:
  - 1948–49
- City Cup:
  - 1934–35, 1936–37
