= 1971–72 City Cup =

Tournament details
- Country: Northern Ireland
- Teams: 12

Final positions
- Champions: Ballymena United (1st win)
- Runners-up: Ards

Tournament statistics
- Matches played: 31
- Goals scored: 106 (3.42 per match)

The 1971–72 City Cup was the 67th edition of the City Cup, a cup competition in Northern Irish football.

The tournament was won by Ballymena United for the 1st time after they defeated Ards 1–0 in the final at The Oval.

This year the tournament reverted to the format used in 1969–70 and would remain this way until the tournament was discontinued.

== Group standings ==
=== Section A ===
| Pos | Team | Pld | W | D | L | GF | GA | GR | Pts | Result |
|---|---|---|---|---|---|---|---|---|---|---|
| 1 | Ards | 5 | 4 | 1 | 0 | 13 | 6 | 2.167 | 9 | Advance to final |
| 2 | Glenavon | 5 | 3 | 0 | 2 | 8 | 6 | 1.333 | 6 | |
| 3 | Linfield | 5 | 2 | 1 | 2 | 6 | 5 | 1.200 | 5 | |
| 4 | Portadown | 5 | 2 | 1 | 2 | 10 | 10 | 1.000 | 5 | |
| 5 | Distillery | 5 | 1 | 1 | 3 | 7 | 9 | 0.778 | 3 | |
| 6 | Bangor | 5 | 1 | 0 | 4 | 4 | 12 | 0.333 | 2 | |

Source: Irish League Archive

=== Section B ===
| Pos | Team | Pld | W | D | L | GF | GA | GR | Pts | Result |
|---|---|---|---|---|---|---|---|---|---|---|
| 1 | Ballymena United | 5 | 4 | 1 | 0 | 13 | 6 | 2.167 | 9 | Advance to final |
| 2 | Coleraine | 5 | 2 | 2 | 1 | 13 | 6 | 2.167 | 6 | |
| 3 | Crusaders | 5 | 2 | 2 | 1 | 7 | 6 | 1.167 | 6 | |
| 4 | Glentoran | 5 | 2 | 1 | 2 | 17 | 8 | 2.125 | 5 | |
| 5 | Derry City | 5 | 0 | 2 | 3 | 4 | 16 | 0.250 | 2 | |
| 6 | Cliftonville | 5 | 0 | 2 | 3 | 1 | 13 | 0.077 | 2 | |

Source: Irish League Archive

== Final ==
4 December 1971

| Ballymena United | 1–0 | Ards |
|---|---|---|
| Averell 80' | Report |

The Oval, Belfast
