= Charlie Tully =

Northern Irish footballer and manager (1924–1971)

Personal information
- Full name: Charles Patrick Tully
- Date of birth: 11 July 1924
- Place of birth: Belfast, Northern Ireland
- Date of death: 27 July 1971 (aged 47)
- Place of death: Belfast, Northern Ireland
- Height: 5 ft 8 in (1.73 m)
- Position: Midfielder

Senior career*
Years	Team	Apps	(Gls)
1944–1948	Belfast Celtic		
1944	→ Cliftonville (loan)		
1948–1959	Celtic	216	(32)
1959–1960	Cork Hibernians		

International career
1948–1958	Northern Ireland	10	(3)

Managerial career
- 1964–1965: Bangor
- 1965: Portadown
- 1968–1971: Bangor
- * Club domestic league appearances and goals

Charles Patrick Tully (11 July 1924 – 27 July 1971) was a Northern Irish football player and manager who played for Celtic.

== Manager ==
He led Bangor to its first senior honour, the County Antrim Shield, in 1970.

He also managed the Irish League XI to 5–2 win against Scottish League XI in 1969.

== Honours ==
Belfast Celtic

- Irish Cup: 1946–47
- Irish League: 1947–48

Celtic

- Scottish Premier Division: 1953–54
- Scottish Cup: 1950–51, 1953–54
- Scottish League Cup: 1957–58, 1957–58
- Saint Mungo Cup: 1951

Bangor

- City Cup: 1970–71
- County Antrim Shield: 1969–70
