= 1902–03 City Cup =

Tournament details
- Country: Ireland
- Date: 25 November 1902 – 23 May 1903
- Teams: 5

Final positions
- Champions: Linfield (7th win)
- Runners-up: Belfast Celtic

Tournament statistics
- Matches played: 19
- Goals scored: 51 (2.68 per match)

The 1902–03 City Cup was the ninth edition of the City Cup, a cup competition in Irish football.

The tournament was won by Linfield for the seventh time and fourth consecutive year. They defeated Belfast Celtic 1–0 in a test match after the teams finished level in the table.

== Group standings ==
Pos	Team	Pld	W	D	L	GF	GA	GR	Pts	Result
1	Linfield	5	3	1	1	13	3	4.333	7	Advance to round-robin playoff
2	Belfast Celtic	5	3	1	1	8	6	1.333	7	Advance to round-robin playoff
3	Glentoran	5	3	1	1	13	7	1.857	7	Advance to round-robin playoff
4	Distillery	5	3	0	2	6	5	1.200	6	
5	Ulster	5	0	2	3	2	11	0.182	2	
6	Cliftonville	5	0	1	4	1	11	0.091	1	

Source: Irish League Archive

== Results ==
=== Group ===
Home \ Away	CEL	CLI	DIS	GLT	LIN	ULS
Belfast Celtic					1–0	1–1
Cliftonville	0–3			1–2	0–5	0–0
Distillery	0–1	1–0		2–1	1–3	2–0
Glentoran	5–2					4–1
Linfield				1–1		4–0
Ulster						

Source: Irish League Archive
Legend: Blue = home team win; Yellow = draw; Red = away team win.

=== Test matches ===
As Linfield, Belfast Celtic and Glentoran finished level on points, a round-robin playoff was played to determine which two teams would advance to the test match final.

==== Round-robin playoff ====
13 April 1903

Belfast Celtic	4–1	Glentoran

Grosvenor Park, Belfast
14 April 1903

Belfast Celtic	0–0	Linfield

Solitude, Belfast
9 May 1903

Linfield	2–0	Glentoran

Grosvenor Park, Belfast

==== Final ====
23 May 1903

Linfield	1–0	Belfast Celtic
Darling	Report

Grosvenor Park, Belfast
