= 1913–14 City Cup =

Tournament details
- Country: Ireland
- Date: 25 December 1913 – 16 May 1914
- Teams: 8

Final positions
- Champions: Glentoran (5th win)
- Runners-up: Linfield

Tournament statistics
- Matches played: 57
- Goals scored: 189 (3.32 per match)

The 1913–14 City Cup was the 20th edition of the City Cup, a cup competition in Irish football.

The tournament was won by Glentoran for the 5th time. They defeated Linfield 2–0 in a test match at Solitude after both teams finished level in the table.

== Group standings ==
Pos	Team	Pld	W	D	L	GF	GA	GR	Pts	Result
1	Glentoran	14	9	4	1	35	14	2.500	22	Advance to test match
2	Linfield	14	9	4	1	39	13	3.000	22	Advance to test match
3	Belfast Celtic	14	4	5	5	18	20	0.900	13	
4	Distillery	14	5	2	7	21	25	0.840	12	
5	Cliftonville	14	5	1	8	17	25	0.680	11	
6	Glenavon	14	5	1	8	23	35	0.657	11	
7	Bohemians	14	4	3	7	19	31	0.613	11	
8	Shelbourne	14	3	4	7	15	24	0.625	10	

Source: Irish League Archive

== Results ==
=== Group ===
Home \ Away	BEL	BOH	CLI	DIS	GLA	GLT	LIN	SHL
Belfast Celtic		0–1	2–0	2–1	4–2	3–3	1–1	1–1
Bohemians	2–2		1–2	2–2	5–2	1–1	1–0	4–1
Cliftonville	1–1	1–0		3–0	4–2	0–3	0–2	3–0
Distillery	0–1	3–0	3–2		3–2	0–3	2–2	3–1
Glenavon	1–0	5–1	3–0	2–0		0–3	0–1	2–1
Glentoran	2–1	3–1	3–0	2–1	5–0		2–2	3–0
Linfield	3–0	6–0	2–1	3–1	8–2	4–1		4–1
Shelbourne	2–0	3–0	3–0	0–2	0–0	1–1	1–1	

Source: Irish League Archive
Legend: Blue = home team win; Yellow = draw; Red = away team win.

=== Test match ===
16 May 1914

Glentoran	2–0	Linfield
Lindsay; Darling (o.g.)	Report

Solitude, Belfast
