= 1956–57 City Cup =

Tournament details
- Country: Northern Ireland
- Teams: 12

Final positions
- Champions: Glentoran (10th win)
- Runners-up: Distillery

Tournament statistics
- Matches played: 69
- Goals scored: 291 (4.22 per match)

The 1956–57 City Cup was the 52nd edition of the City Cup, a cup competition in Northern Irish football.

The tournament was won by Glentoran for the 10th time. They defeated Distillery 2–1 in a test match at Solitude after both teams finished level on points in the group standings.

== Group standings ==
Pos	Team	Pld	W	D	L	GF	GA	GR	Pts	Result
1	Glentoran	11	8	2	1	25	11	2.273	18	Advance to test match
2	Distillery	11	9	0	2	35	10	3.500	18	Advance to test match
3	Ards	11	6	3	2	33	18	1.833	15	
4	Linfield	11	6	3	2	28	17	1.647	15	
5	Glenavon	11	5	2	4	29	19	1.526	12	
6	Cliftonville	11	5	1	5	18	25	0.720	11	
7	Coleraine	11	3	4	4	22	22	1.000	10	
8	Portadown	11	3	3	5	17	28	0.607	9	
9	Derry City	11	3	2	6	24	28	0.857	8	
10	Ballymena United	11	3	1	7	21	35	0.600	7	
11	Bangor	11	2	2	7	14	34	0.412	6	
12	Crusaders	11	1	1	9	22	41	0.537	3	

Source: Irish League Archive

=== Test match ===
20 May 1957

Glentoran	2–1	Distillery

Solitude, Belfast
