= 1910–11 City Cup =

Tournament details
- Country: Ireland
- Date: 24 December 1910 – 15 May 1911
- Teams: 6

Final positions
- Champions: Glentoran (3rd win)
- Runners-up: Belfast Celtic

Tournament statistics
- Matches played: 30
- Goals scored: 92 (3.07 per match)

The 1910–11 City Cup was the 17th edition of the City Cup, a cup competition in Irish football.

The tournament was won by Glentoran for the third time.

== Group standings ==
Pos	Team	Pld	W	D	L	GF	GA	GR	Pts	Result
1	Glentoran (C)	10	8	2	0	25	8	3.125	18	Champions
2	Belfast Celtic	10	4	3	3	13	11	1.182	11	
3	Cliftonville	10	4	2	4	14	16	0.875	10	
4	Linfield	10	1	6	3	12	14	0.857	8	
5	Shelbourne	10	2	3	5	11	21	0.524	7	
6	Distillery	10	1	4	5	17	22	0.773	6	

Source: Irish League Archive
(C) Champions

== Results ==
Home \ Away	CEL	CLI	DIS	GLT	LIN	SHL
Belfast Celtic		1–2	4–0	1–1	1–0	3–1
Cliftonville	2–1		2–1	0–1	1–1	3–1
Distillery	1–1	6–2		1–2	1–1	1–1
Glentoran	4–0	1–0	4–2		5–1	3–1
Linfield	0–1	1–1	2–2	1–1		5–1
Shelbourne	0–0	2–1	3–2	1–3	0–0	

Source: Irish League Archive
Legend: Blue = home team win; Yellow = draw; Red = away team win.
