= 1911–12 City Cup =

Tournament details
- Country: Ireland
- Date: 16 December 1911 – 1 May 1912
- Teams: 9

Final positions
- Champions: Glentoran (4th win)
- Runners-up: Distillery

Tournament statistics
- Matches played: 53
- Goals scored: 154 (2.91 per match)

The 1911–12 City Cup was the 18th edition of the City Cup, a cup competition in Irish football.

The tournament was won by Glentoran for the 4th time and 2nd consecutive year.

Not all the matches were played due to a dispute between clubs and the Irish Football Association which meant Linfield were excluded from matches after February 1912 and had to complete their matches under the name Belfast Blues (their results however, were counted separately from Linfield's). Additionally, Derry Celtic forfeited three of their matches.

== Group standings ==
Pos	Team	Pld	W	D	L	GF	GA	GR	Pts	Result
1	Glentoran (C)	14	10	4	0	33	12	2.750	24	Champions
2	Distillery	13	6	4	3	24	12	2.000	18 (Note: 2 points added)	
3	Cliftonville	14	7	2	5	27	24	1.125	16	
4	Derry Celtic	11	4	4	3	8	12	0.667	12	
5	Linfield	8	6	0	2	19	5	3.800	12	
6	Belfast Celtic	13	3	4	6	11	16	0.688	12 (Note: 2 points added)	
7	Belfast Blues	6	2	3	1	8	7	1.143	7	
8	Glenavon	13	2	0	11	12	30	0.400	6 (Note: 2 points added)	
9	Shelbourne	14	2	1	11	12	36	0.333	5	

Source: Irish League Archive
(C) Champions

== Results ==
Home \ Away	BBL	CEL	CLI	DER	DIS	GLA	GLT	LIN	SHL
Belfast Blues							0–2		3–1
Belfast Celtic	1–1		1–2	– (Note: Derry Celtic forfeited, opponents awarded win.)	0–0	1–0	1–2		3–0
Cliftonville	1–1	2–1		3–0	2–1	4–0	1–2		3–1
Derry Celtic	1–1	0–0	3–1		0–0	1–0	1–1		1–0
Distillery		2–1	4–0	–		2–0	1–1	2–1	6–0
Glenavon	1–2	3–0	1–2	–	0–4		3–6		3–0
Glentoran		0–0	2–2	3–0	5–2	2–0		1–0	5–1
Linfield		3–0	3–1	3–0	2–0	3–0			
Shelbourne		1–2	4–3	0–1	0–0	3–1	0–1	1–4	

Source: Irish League Archive
Legend: Blue = home team win; Yellow = draw; Red = away team win.
