= 1895–96 City Cup =

Tournament details
- Country: Ireland
- Date: 26 October 1895 – 22 May 1896
- Teams: 4

Final positions
- Champions: Linfield (2nd win)
- Runners-up: Distillery

Tournament statistics
- Matches played: 14
- Goals scored: 55 (3.93 per match)

The 1895–96 City Cup was the second edition of the City Cup, a cup competition in Irish football.

The tournament was won by Linfield for the second time and second consecutive year. They defeated Distillery 2–1 in a test match replay after both teams finished level on points in the table, and after the first test match to decide the winner ended in a draw.

== Group standings ==
Pos	Team	Pld	W	D	L	GF	GA	GR	Pts	Result
1	Linfield	6	5	0	1	15	10	1.500	10	Advance to test match
2	Distillery	6	5	0	1	24	10	2.400	10	Advance to test match
3	Glentoran	6	2	0	4	9	13	0.692	4	
4	Cliftonville	6	0	0	6	2	17	0.118	0	

Source: Irish League Archive

== Results ==
=== Group ===
Home \ Away	CLI	DIS	GLT	LIN
Cliftonville		0–1	0–1	0–4
Distillery	6–1		4–1	8–2
Glentoran	4–1	2–4		1–2
Linfield	1–0	4–1	2–0	

Source: Irish League Archive
Legend: Blue = home team win; Yellow = draw; Red = away team win.

=== Test match ===
18 May 1896

Linfield	1–1	Distillery
McAllen	Report	Peden

Grosvenor Park, Belfast

=== Replay ===
22 May 1896

Linfield	2–1	Distillery
Jordan ?	Report	Peden

Grosvenor Park, Belfast
Attendance: 2,000
Referee: Barnett
