= 1897–98 City Cup =

Tournament details
- Country: Ireland
- Date: 11 December 1897 – 14 May 1898
- Teams: 6

Final positions
- Champions: Linfield (3rd win)
- Runners-up: Celtic

Tournament statistics
- Matches played: 30
- Goals scored: 120 (4 per match)

The 1897–98 City Cup was the fourth edition of the City Cup, a cup competition in Irish football.

The tournament was won by Linfield for the third time.

== Group standings ==
Pos	Team	Pld	W	D	L	GF	GA	GR	Pts	Result
1	Linfield (C)	10	8	0	2	27	7	3.857	16	Champions
2	Celtic	10	6	2	2	31	19	1.632	14	
3	Cliftonville	10	5	3	2	22	12	1.833	13	
4	Glentoran	10	4	3	3	15	16	0.938	11	
5	Distillery	10	2	0	8	11	25	0.440	4	
6	North Staffordshire Regiment	10	0	2	8	14	41	0.341	2	

Source: Irish League Archive
(C) Champions

== Results ==
Home \ Away	CEL	CLI	DIS	GLT	LIN	NSR
Celtic		4–3	4–1	3–2	0–2	10–2
Cliftonville	2–2		3–0	5–0	2–1	3–1
Distillery	0–2	1–2		0–3	0–1	3–2
Glentoran	1–1	0–0	2–1		2–0	2–0
Linfield	6–1	1–0	4–0	3–0		4–1
North Staffs	0–4	2–2	2–5	3–3	1–5	

Source: Irish League Archive
Legend: Blue = home team win; Yellow = draw; Red = away team win.
