= 1975–76 City Cup =

Tournament details
- Country: Northern Ireland
- Teams: 12

Final positions
- Champions: Bangor (2nd win)
- Runners-up: Coleraine

Tournament statistics
- Matches played: 31
- Goals scored: 107 (3.45 per match)

The 1975–76 City Cup was the 71st and final edition of the City Cup, a cup competition in Northern Irish football.

The tournament was won by Bangor for the 2nd time after they defeated Coleraine 3–1 in a penalty shootout in the final at Windsor Park, after the match finished 0-0.

== Group standings ==
=== Section A ===
Pos	Team	Pld	W	D	L	GF	GA	GR	Pts	Result
1	Bangor	5	4	1	0	12	6	2.000	9	Advance to final
2	Linfield	5	4	0	1	8	5	1.600	8	
3	Ards	5	2	2	1	13	8	1.625	6	
4	Portadown	5	2	0	3	12	11	1.091	4	
5	Distillery	5	0	2	3	3	8	0.375	2	
6	Glenavon	5	0	1	4	2	12	0.167	1	

Source: Irish League Archive

=== Section B ===
Pos	Team	Pld	W	D	L	GF	GA	GR	Pts	Result
1	Coleraine	5	3	2	0	16	5	3.200	8	Advance to final
2	Ballymena United	5	1	3	1	7	7	1.000	5	
3	Larne	5	2	1	2	7	13	0.538	5	
4	Crusaders	5	2	0	3	7	8	0.875	4	
5	Glentoran	5	1	2	2	11	13	0.846	4	
6	Cliftonville	5	1	2	2	9	11	0.818	4	

Source: Irish League Archive

== Final ==
10 December 1975

Bangor	0 – 0 (a.e.t.)	Coleraine
	Report
Penalties
Thompson (penalty scored); Feeney (penalty scored); McCullough (penalty scored)	3 – 1	(penalty scored) Beckett; (penalty missed) McCurdy; (penalty missed) Cochrane; (penalty missed) Murray

Seaview, Belfast
Referee: E. Smyton (Dungannon)
