= 1919–20 City Cup =

Tournament details
- Country: Ireland
- Date: 30 December 1919 – 11 May 1920
- Teams: 8

Final positions
- Champions: Linfield (11th win)
- Runners-up: Belfast Celtic

Tournament statistics
- Matches played: 56
- Goals scored: 145 (2.59 per match)

The 1919–20 City Cup was the 22nd edition of the City Cup, a cup competition in Irish football.

The tournament was won by Linfield for the 11th time.

== Group standings ==
Pos	Team	Pld	W	D	L	GF	GA	GR	Pts	Result
1	Linfield (C)	14	10	4	0	27	2	13.500	24	Champions
2	Belfast Celtic	14	7	3	4	24	10	2.400	17	
3	Distillery	14	7	2	5	18	10	1.800	16	
4	Cliftonville	14	6	2	6	17	18	0.944	14	
5	Shelbourne	14	6	2	6	20	25	0.800	14	
6	Glenavon	14	4	3	7	16	24	0.667	11	
7	Glentoran	14	4	2	8	13	18	0.722	10	
8	Bohemians	14	2	2	10	10	38	0.263	6	

Source: Irish League Archive
(C) Champions

== Results ==
Home \ Away	BCE	BOH	CLI	DIS	GLA	GLT	LIN	SHE
Belfast Celtic		5–1	3–0	1–0	3–1	3–0	0–1	4–1
Bohemians	2–1		1–4	0–2	3–0	0–2	0–0	0–0
Cliftonville	0–2	3–0		0–2	0–0	3–0	0–1	2–1
Distillery	1–0	4–2	3–0		1–1	2–1	0–0	3–0
Glenavon	1–1	4–1	1–2	2–1		1–0	0–5	2–0
Glentoran	0–0	7–0	0–2	1–0	1–0		0–0	1–2
Linfield	1–0	3–0	1–1	1–0	2–0	3–0		4–1
Shelbourne	1–1	4–0	3–0	1–0	4–3	2–0	0–5	

Source: Irish League Archive
Legend: Blue = home team win; Yellow = draw; Red = away team win.
