= 1933–34 City Cup =

Tournament details
- Country: Northern Ireland
- Teams: 14

Final positions
- Champions: Distillery (3rd win)
- Runners-up: Belfast Celtic

Tournament statistics
- Matches played: 89
- Goals scored: 372 (4.18 per match)

The 1933–34 City Cup was the 36th edition of the City Cup, a cup competition in Northern Irish football.

The tournament was won by Distillery for the 3rd time.

== Group standings ==
Pos	Team	Pld	W	D	L	GF	GA	GR	Pts	Result
1	Distillery (C)	13	8	4	1	31	11	2.818	20	Champions
2	Belfast Celtic	13	9	1	3	36	15	2.400	19	
3	Portadown	13	9	1	3	34	15	2.267	19	
4	Linfield	13	8	2	3	40	13	3.077	18	
5	Glentoran	13	5	4	4	25	24	1.042	14	
6	Derry City	13	6	1	6	32	21	1.524	13	
7	Glenavon	13	5	3	5	31	36	0.861	13	
8	Newry Town	13	5	3	5	23	35	0.657	13	
9	Bangor	13	5	2	6	19	23	0.826	12	
10	Coleraine	13	3	5	5	23	38	0.605	11	
11	Cliftonville	13	3	4	6	14	25	0.560	10	
12	Ards	13	3	2	8	22	42	0.524	8	
13	Ballymena	13	2	2	9	19	32	0.594	6	
14	Larne	13	2	2	9	20	39	0.513	6	

Source: Irish League Archive
(C) Champions
