= 1906–07 City Cup =

Tournament details
- Country: Ireland
- Date: 29 September 1906 – 31 August 1907
- Teams: 6

Final positions
- Champions: Belfast Celtic (2nd win)
- Runners-up: Cliftonville

Tournament statistics
- Matches played: 30
- Goals scored: 100 (3.33 per match)

The 1906–07 City Cup was the 13th edition of the City Cup, a cup competition in Irish football.

The tournament was won by Belfast Celtic for the second time and second consecutive year.

== Group standings ==
Pos	Team	Pld	W	D	L	GF	GA	GR	Pts	Result
1	Belfast Celtic (C)	10	6	3	1	23	12	1.917	15	Champions
2	Cliftonville	10	5	3	2	17	12	1.417	13	
3	Distillery	10	3	4	3	17	16	1.063	10	
4	Shelbourne	10	3	2	5	15	19	0.789	8	
5	Linfield	10	2	4	4	15	21	0.714	8	
6	Glentoran	10	2	2	6	13	20	0.650	6	

Source: Irish League Archive
(C) Champions

== Results ==
Home \ Away	CEL	CLI	DIS	GLT	LIN	SHL
Belfast Celtic		0–0	4–0	3–1	2–2	2–0
Cliftonville	1–1		2–2	2–0	4–3	4–0
Distillery	3–4	0–1		3–1	2–1	4–0
Glentoran	0–1	2–3	2–2		3–1	2–1
Linfield	3–2	1–0	1–1	1–1		2–2
Shelbourne	2–4	3–0	0–0	3–1	4–0	

Source: Irish League Archive
Legend: Blue = home team win; Yellow = draw; Red = away team win.
