= 1916–17 Belfast City Cup =

Tournament details
- Country: Ireland
- Date: 2 December 1916 – 11 May 1917
- Teams: 6

Final positions
- Champions: Glentoran (2nd win)
- Runners-up: Linfield

Tournament statistics
- Matches played: 30
- Goals scored: 97 (3.23 per match)

The 1916–17 Belfast City Cup was the 2nd edition of the Belfast City Cup, a cup competition in Irish football. It replaced the City Cup, which was suspended due to World War I.

The tournament was won by Glentoran for the 2nd time and 2nd consecutive year.

== Group standings ==
| Pos | Team | Pld | W | D | L | GF | GA | GR | Pts | Result |
|---|---|---|---|---|---|---|---|---|---|---|
| 1 | Glentoran (C) | 10 | 10 | 0 | 0 | 34 | 7 | 4.857 | 20 | Champions |
| 2 | Linfield | 10 | 7 | 0 | 3 | 27 | 14 | 1.929 | 14 | |
| 3 | Distillery | 10 | 4 | 1 | 5 | 12 | 13 | 0.923 | 9 | |
| 4 | Belfast United | 10 | 3 | 1 | 6 | 10 | 17 | 0.588 | 7 | |
| 5 | Cliftonville | 10 | 2 | 2 | 6 | 9 | 17 | 0.529 | 6 | |
| 6 | Glenavon | 10 | 2 | 0 | 8 | 5 | 29 | 0.172 | 4 | |

Source: British Newspaper Archive
(C) Champions

== Results ==
| Home \ Away | BEL | CLI | DIS | GLA | GLT | LIN |
|---|---|---|---|---|---|---|
| Belfast United | | 3–2 | 0–1 | 2–0 | 2–5 | 0–3 |
| Cliftonville | 0–0 | | 1–1 | 2–0 | 1–3 | 0–5 |
| Distillery | 2–0 | 1–0 | | 4–0 | 0–1 | 1–3 |
| Glenavon | 0–1 | 2–1 | 1–0 | | 1–3 | 1–3 |
| Glentoran | 3–2 | 1–0 | 3–0 | 7–0 | | 6–1 |
| Linfield | 1–0 | 1–2 | 4–2 | 6–0 | 0–2 | |

Source: Irish League Archive
Legend: Blue = home team win; Yellow = draw; Red = away team win.
