= 1921–22 City Cup =

Tournament details
- Country: Northern Ireland
- Date: 26 November 1921 – 21 January 1922
- Teams: 6

Final positions
- Champions: Linfield (10th win)
- Runners-up: Glentoran

Tournament statistics
- Matches played: 30
- Goals scored: 96 (3.2 per match)

The 1921–22 City Cup was the 24th edition of the City Cup, a cup competition in Northern Irish football.

The tournament was won by Linfield for the 10th time.

== Group standings ==
Pos	Team	Pld	W	D	L	GF	GA	GR	Pts	Result
1	Linfield (C)	10	8	2	0	17	6	2.833	18	Champions
2	Glentoran	10	6	2	2	19	12	1.583	14	
3	Glenavon	10	4	3	3	23	17	1.353	11	
4	Cliftonville	10	3	3	4	11	14	0.786	9	
5	Queen's Island	10	3	2	5	14	19	0.737	8	
6	Distillery	10	0	0	10	12	28	0.429	0	

Source: Irish League Archive
(C) Champions

== Results ==
Home \ Away	CLI	DIS	GLA	GLT	LIN	QUE
Cliftonville		1–0	1–3	1–2	1–4	3–1
Distillery	1–2		2–5	2–5	1–2	0–1
Glenavon	0–0	4–2		2–2	0–1	4–1
Glentoran	2–1	2–1	3–2		0–1	2–0
Linfield	0–0	2–1	2–0	1–1		2–1
Queen's Island	1–1	4–2	3–3	1–0	1–2	

Source: Irish League Archive
Legend: Blue = home team win; Yellow = draw; Red = away team win.
