= 1923–24 City Cup =

Tournament details
- Country: Northern Ireland
- Teams: 10

Final positions
- Champions: Queen's Island (2nd win)
- Runners-up: Glentoran

Tournament statistics
- Matches played: 46
- Goals scored: 150 (3.26 per match)

The 1923–24 City Cup was the 26th edition of the City Cup, a cup competition in Northern Irish football.

The tournament was won by Queen's Island for the 2nd time and 2nd consecutive year. They defeated Glentoran 3–2 in a test match at Windsor Park after both teams finished level on points in the group standings.

== Group standings ==
Pos	Team	Pld	W	D	L	GF	GA	GR	Pts	Result
1	Queen's Island	9	6	2	1	28	9	3.111	14	Advance to test match
2	Glentoran	9	6	2	1	26	12	2.167	14	Advance to test match
3	Distillery	9	5	1	3	14	11	1.273	11	
4	Linfield	9	4	2	3	13	15	0.867	10	
5	Larne	9	4	1	4	19	17	1.118	9	
6	Ards	9	3	3	3	11	11	1.000	9	
7	Barn	9	3	1	5	7	16	0.438	7	
8	Glenavon	9	2	2	5	6	13	0.462	6	
9	Newry Town	9	2	1	6	11	21	0.524	5	
10	Cliftonville	9	2	1	6	10	20	0.500	5	

Source: Irish League Archive

=== Test match ===
19 May 1924

Queen's Island	3–2	Glentoran

Windsor Park, Belfast
