= 1926–27 City Cup =

Tournament details
- Country: Northern Ireland
- Teams: 12

Final positions
- Champions: Linfield (13th win)
- Runners-up: Belfast Celtic

Tournament statistics
- Matches played: 66
- Goals scored: 251 (3.8 per match)

The 1926–27 City Cup was the 29th edition of the City Cup, a cup competition in Northern Irish football.

The tournament was won by Linfield for the 13th time.

== Group standings ==
Pos	Team	Pld	W	D	L	GF	GA	GR	Pts	Result
1	Linfield (C)	11	8	2	1	24	10	2.400	18	Champions
2	Belfast Celtic	11	8	1	2	32	16	2.000	17	
3	Queen's Island	11	6	4	1	21	12	1.750	16	
4	Cliftonville	11	6	2	3	17	11	1.545	14	
5	Portadown	11	4	3	4	28	21	1.333	11	
6	Glentoran	11	5	0	6	25	30	0.833	10	
7	Ards	11	3	3	5	25	25	1.000	9	
8	Larne	11	4	1	6	16	18	0.889	9	
9	Glenavon	11	2	5	4	16	19	0.842	9	
10	Distillery	11	4	1	6	14	19	0.737	9	
11	Newry Town	11	2	3	6	14	31	0.452	7	
12	Barn	11	1	1	9	19	39	0.487	3	

Source: Irish League Archive
(C) Champions
