= 1898–99 City Cup =

Tournament details
- Country: Ireland
- Date: 10 December 1898 – 13 May 1899
- Teams: 5

Final positions
- Champions: Glentoran (2nd win)
- Runners-up: Linfield

Tournament statistics
- Matches played: 20
- Goals scored: 65 (3.25 per match)

The 1898–99 City Cup was the fifth edition of the City Cup, a cup competition in Irish football.

The tournament was won by Glentoran for the second time.

== Group standings ==
Pos	Team	Pld	W	D	L	GF	GA	GR	Pts	Result
1	Glentoran (C)	8	5	2	1	13	9	1.444	12	Champions
2	Linfield	8	4	2	2	15	10	1.500	10	
3	Celtic	8	3	2	3	15	13	1.154	8	
4	Distillery	8	3	1	4	14	15	0.933	7	
5	Cliftonville	8	1	1	6	8	18	0.444	3	

Source: Irish League Archive
(C) Champions

== Results ==
Home \ Away	CEL	CLI	DIS	GLT	LIN
Celtic		4–2	4–0	2–2	1–1
Cliftonville	2–1		1–3	0–1	1–2
Distillery	3–1	3–0		0–3	3–3
Glentoran	3–1	1–1	2–1		1–4
Linfield	0–1	3–1	2–1	0–1	

Source: Irish League Archive
Legend: Blue = home team win; Yellow = draw; Red = away team win.
