= 1909–10 City Cup =

Tournament details
- Country: Ireland
- Date: 30 October 1909 – 23 April 1910
- Teams: 6

Final positions
- Champions: Linfield (10th win)
- Runners-up: Distillery

Tournament statistics
- Matches played: 30
- Goals scored: 78 (2.6 per match)

The 1909–10 City Cup was the 16th edition of the City Cup, a cup competition in Irish football.

The tournament was won by Linfield for the tenth time.

== Group standings ==
Pos	Team	Pld	W	D	L	GF	GA	GR	Pts	Result
1	Linfield (C)	10	7	2	1	20	7	2.857	16	Champions
2	Distillery	10	5	3	2	14	11	1.273	13	
3	Glentoran	10	4	4	2	18	11	1.636	12	
4	Cliftonville	10	4	3	3	9	11	0.818	11	
5	Shelbourne	10	2	2	6	11	16	0.688	6	
6	Belfast Celtic	10	0	2	8	7	23	0.304	2	

Source: Irish League Archive
(C) Champions

== Results ==
Home \ Away	CEL	CLI	DIS	GLT	LIN	SHL
Belfast Celtic		0–2	2–4	2–2	1–3	1–1
Cliftonville	1–0		0–0	2–1	0–2	1–0
Distillery	1–0	2–0		1–1	1–1	2–0
Glentoran	3–1	1–1	4–1		1–1	3–0
Linfield	2–0	3–0	2–0	2–1		3–1
Shelbourne	4–0	2–2	1–2	0–1	2–1	

Source: Irish League Archive
Legend: Blue = home team win; Yellow = draw; Red = away team win.
