= 1951–52 City Cup =

Tournament details
- Country: Northern Ireland
- Teams: 12

Final positions
- Champions: Linfield (18th win)
- Runners-up: Glentoran

Tournament statistics
- Matches played: 69
- Goals scored: 281 (4.07 per match)

The 1951–52 City Cup was the 47th edition of the City Cup, a cup competition in Northern Irish football.

The tournament was won by Linfield for the 18th time. They defeated Glentoran 3–2 in a test match at Grosvenor Park after both teams finished level on points in the group standings.

== Group standings ==
Pos	Team	Pld	W	D	L	GF	GA	GR	Pts	Result
1	Linfield	11	7	3	1	24	12	2.000	17	Advance to test match
2	Glentoran	11	7	3	1	37	20	1.850	17	Advance to test match
3	Glenavon	11	4	5	2	21	11	1.909	13	
4	Coleraine	11	6	1	4	25	19	1.316	13	
5	Portadown	11	6	1	4	31	26	1.192	13	
6	Crusaders	11	5	2	4	21	19	1.105	12	
7	Ards	11	5	2	4	27	26	1.038	12	
8	Distillery	11	4	2	5	23	29	0.793	10	
9	Ballymena United	11	3	3	5	14	18	0.778	9	
10	Cliftonville	11	2	2	7	21	32	0.656	6	
11	Bangor	11	2	1	8	19	33	0.576	5	
12	Derry City	11	2	1	8	13	31	0.419	5	

Source: Irish League Archive

=== Test match ===
12 May 1952

Linfield	3–2	Glentoran

Grosvenor Park, Belfast
