= 1901–02 City Cup =

Tournament details
- Country: Ireland
- Date: 25 December 1901 – 25 May 1903
- Teams: 6

Final positions
- Champions: Linfield (6th win)
- Runners-up: Glentoran

Tournament statistics
- Matches played: 33
- Goals scored: 95 (2.88 per match)

The 1901–02 City Cup was the eighth edition of the City Cup, a cup competition in Irish football.

The tournament was won by Linfield for the sixth time and third consecutive year.

== Group standings ==
Pos	Team	Pld	W	D	L	GF	GA	GR	Pts	Result
1	Linfield (C)	10	6	3	1	21	6	3.500	15	Champions
2	Glentoran	10	5	4	1	14	7	2.000	14	
3	Belfast Celtic	10	6	2	2	20	16	1.250	14	
4	Distillery	10	4	2	4	16	14	1.143	10	
5	Ulster	10	2	0	8	12	27	0.444	4	
6	Cliftonville	10	1	1	8	6	19	0.316	3	

Source: Irish League Archive
(C) Champions

== Results ==
=== Group ===
Home \ Away	CEL	CLI	DIS	GLT	LIN	ULS
Belfast Celtic		4–1	3–1	2–1	1–1	2–0
Cliftonville	1–2		1–1	0–1	0–3	5–1
Distillery	4–0	1–0		1–2	0–1	3–1
Glentoran	1–1	2–0	1–1		1–1	3–1
Linfield	5–0	2–0	3–0	0–0		3–1
Ulster	0–5	2–0	2–4	0–2	3–2	

Source: Irish League Archive
Legend: Blue = home team win; Yellow = draw; Red = away team win.

=== 2nd/3rd place play-off ===
The match and subsequent replays were held over until the 1902–03 season:

- 14 March 1903, Belfast Celtic 1–1 Glentoran (Grosvenor Park, Belfast)
- 10 April 1903, Belfast Celtic 1–1 Glentoran (Grosvenor Park, Belfast)
- 25 May 1903, Belfast Celtic 2–0 Glentoran (Grosvenor Park, Belfast)
