= 1917–18 Belfast City Cup =

Tournament details
- Country: Ireland
- Date: 24 November 1917 – 6 May 1918
- Teams: 6

Final positions
- Champions: Linfield (1st win)
- Runners-up: Glentoran

Tournament statistics
- Matches played: 30
- Goals scored: 97 (3.23 per match)

The 1917–18 Belfast City Cup was the 3rd edition of the Belfast City Cup, a cup competition in Irish football. It replaced the City Cup, which was suspended due to World War I.

The tournament was won by Linfield for the 1st time.

== Group standings ==
Pos	Team	Pld	W	D	L	GF	GA	GR	Pts	Result
1	Linfield (C)	10	8	1	1	21	6	3.500	17	Champions
2	Glentoran	10	6	2	2	20	6	3.333	14	
3	Distillery	10	5	3	2	18	14	1.286	13	
4	Belfast United	10	4	1	5	14	19	0.737	9	
5	Cliftonville	10	2	0	8	6	18	0.333	4	
6	Glenavon	10	1	1	8	6	22	0.273	3	

Source: British Newspaper Archive
(C) Champions

== Results ==
Home \ Away	BEL	CLI	DIS	GLA	GLT	LIN
Belfast United		1–2	0–1	2–1	1–5	0–1
Cliftonville	0–1		1–4	2–0	0–2	0–3
Distillery	1–2	3–0		2–2	1–1	3–2
Glenavon	1–5	2–1	0–1		0–1	0–3
Glentoran	0–0	4–0	3–1	4–1		0–1
Linfield	6–1	1–0	1–1	2–1	1–0	

Source: Irish League Archive
Legend: Blue = home team win; Yellow = draw; Red = away team win.
