= 1947–48 City Cup =

Tournament details
- Country: Northern Ireland
- Teams: 12

Final positions
- Champions: Belfast Celtic (9th win)
- Runners-up: Glentoran

Tournament statistics
- Matches played: 69
- Goals scored: 273 (3.96 per match)

The 1947–48 City Cup was the 43rd edition of the City Cup, a cup competition in Northern Irish football.

Having not been played since the 1939–40 season due to the Second World War, the tournament was won by holders Belfast Celtic for the 9th time.

== Group standings ==
Pos	Team	Pld	W	D	L	GF	GA	GR	Pts	Result
1	Belfast Celtic (C)	11	10	0	1	36	7	5.143	20	Champions
2	Glentoran	11	8	1	2	30	7	4.286	17	
3	Linfield	11	8	1	2	37	16	2.313	17	
4	Distillery	11	7	2	2	23	10	2.300	16	
5	Ards	11	5	3	3	22	16	1.375	13	
6	Ballymena United	11	3	5	3	22	24	0.917	11	
7	Bangor	11	5	0	6	27	33	0.818	10	
8	Coleraine	11	4	2	5	17	22	0.773	10	
9	Glenavon	11	2	2	7	13	25	0.520	6	
10	Cliftonville	11	2	1	8	15	35	0.429	5	
11	Derry City	11	2	0	9	14	39	0.359	4	
12	Portadown	11	1	1	9	12	34	0.353	3	

Source: Irish League Archive
(C) Champions
