= 1908–09 City Cup =

Tournament details
- Country: Ireland
- Date: 17 October 1908 – 27 April 1909
- Teams: 6

Final positions
- Champions: Shelbourne (1st win)
- Runners-up: Glentoran

Tournament statistics
- Matches played: 30
- Goals scored: 91 (3.03 per match)

The 1908–09 City Cup was the 15th edition of the City Cup, a cup competition in Irish football.

The tournament was won by Shelbourne for the first time.

== Group standings ==
Pos	Team	Pld	W	D	L	GF	GA	GR	Pts	Result
1	Shelbourne (C)	10	7	1	2	22	13	1.692	15	Champions
2	Glentoran	10	4	4	2	13	14	0.929	12	
3	Cliftonville	10	3	3	4	12	10	1.200	9	
4	Distillery	10	3	3	4	14	17	0.824	9	
5	Linfield	10	4	0	6	14	17	0.824	8	
6	Belfast Celtic	10	3	1	6	16	20	0.800	7	

Source: Irish League Archive
(C) Champions

== Results ==
Home \ Away	CEL	CLI	DIS	GLT	LIN	SHL
Belfast Celtic		2–1	5–1	3–3	0–3	0–1
Cliftonville	2–0		3–1	1–1	0–2	4–0
Distillery	2–1	0–0		1–1	2–1	3–3
Glentoran	2–1	1–1	1–0		2–0	0–3
Linfield	1–4	1–0	0–3	1–2		2–1
Shelbourne	4–0	2–0	2–1	3–0	2–0	

Source: Irish League Archive
Legend: Blue = home team win; Yellow = draw; Red = away team win.
