= Peter Keely =

Irish footballer

Personal information
- Date of birth: 1922
- Date of death: 15 October 2004 (aged 82)

Senior career*
| Years | Team | Apps | (Gls) |
| 1941–1956 | Shelbourne | 150 | (14) |
- * Club domestic league appearances and goals

Peter Keely (1922 – 15 October 2004) was an Irish footballer who played with Shelbourne and represented the league internationally. Keely won two league titles, in 1947 and 1953, two Shields and two inter-league caps during his eleven season with Shels. Following his 1947 title, he was offered £2,000 to transfer to Leeds United, but declined. He played as a wing-halfback and was released by Shels in July 1956.

His son Dermot had two spells as Shelbourne manager.

Peter Keely was given a Hall of Fame award at the 1997 FAI Cup final alongside Fay Coyle.
