= 1963–64 City Cup =

Tournament details
- Country: Northern Ireland
- Teams: 12

Final positions
- Champions: Linfield (22nd win)
- Runners-up: Glentoran

Tournament statistics
- Matches played: 68
- Goals scored: 288 (4.24 per match)

The 1963–64 City Cup was the 59th edition of the City Cup, a cup competition in Northern Irish football.

The tournament was won by Linfield for the 22nd time.

== Group standings ==
| Pos | Team | Pld | W | D | L | GF | GA | GR | Pts | Result |
|---|---|---|---|---|---|---|---|---|---|---|
| 1 | Linfield (C) | 11 | 7 | 4 | 0 | 40 | 13 | 3.077 | 18 | Champions |
| 2 | Glentoran | 11 | 8 | 0 | 3 | 31 | 18 | 1.722 | 16 | |
| 3 | Glenavon | 11 | 6 | 3 | 2 | 27 | 18 | 1.500 | 15 | |
| 4 | Coleraine | 11 | 6 | 2 | 3 | 26 | 15 | 1.733 | 14 | |
| 5 | Derry City | 11 | 5 | 3 | 3 | 29 | 15 | 1.933 | 13 | |
| 6 | Crusaders | 11 | 5 | 2 | 4 | 24 | 22 | 1.091 | 12 | |
| 7 | Ards | 11 | 4 | 3 | 4 | 24 | 28 | 0.857 | 11 | |
| 8 | Portadown | 11 | 4 | 2 | 5 | 18 | 25 | 0.720 | 10 | |
| 9 | Distillery | 11 | 3 | 2 | 6 | 22 | 24 | 0.917 | 8 | |
| 10 | Cliftonville | 11 | 3 | 0 | 8 | 17 | 47 | 0.362 | 6 | |
| 11 | Ballymena United | 11 | 2 | 1 | 8 | 13 | 23 | 0.565 | 5 | |
| 12 | Bangor | 11 | 1 | 2 | 8 | 17 | 40 | 0.425 | 4 | |

Source: Irish League Archive
(C) Champions
