= 1957–58 City Cup =

Tournament details
- Country: Northern Ireland
- Teams: 12

Final positions
- Champions: Linfield (19th win)
- Runners-up: Glentoran

Tournament statistics
- Matches played: 68
- Goals scored: 274 (4.03 per match)

The 1957–58 City Cup was the 53rd edition of the City Cup, a cup competition in Northern Irish football.

The tournament was won by Linfield for the 19th time.

== Group standings ==
Pos	Team	Pld	W	D	L	GF	GA	GR	Pts	Result
1	Linfield (C)	11	9	1	1	33	10	3.300	19	Champions
2	Glentoran	11	8	2	1	35	16	2.188	18	
3	Distillery	11	7	2	2	29	13	2.231	16	
4	Glenavon	11	6	2	3	35	19	1.842	14	
5	Ards	11	6	2	3	26	22	1.182	14	
6	Derry City	11	4	2	5	22	31	0.710	10	
7	Ballymena United	11	4	1	6	19	28	0.679	9	
8	Cliftonville	11	3	2	6	13	22	0.591	8	
9	Coleraine	11	3	1	7	14	29	0.483	7	
10	Bangor	11	3	0	8	20	23	0.870	6	
11	Crusaders	11	3	0	8	14	29	0.483	6	
12	Portadown	11	2	1	8	14	32	0.438	5	

Source: Irish League Archive
(C) Champions
