= 1954–55 City Cup =

Tournament details
- Country: Northern Ireland
- Teams: 12

Final positions
- Champions: Glenavon (2nd win)
- Runners-up: Distillery

Tournament statistics
- Matches played: 68
- Goals scored: 249 (3.66 per match)

The 1954–55 City Cup was the 50th edition of the City Cup, a cup competition in Northern Irish football.

The tournament was won by Glenavon for the 2nd time.

== Group standings ==
Pos	Team	Pld	W	D	L	GF	GA	GR	Pts	Result
1	Glenavon (C)	11	9	1	1	30	17	1.765	19	Champions
2	Distillery	11	6	2	3	29	18	1.611	14	
3	Linfield	11	6	2	3	22	14	1.571	14	
4	Coleraine	11	6	2	3	21	17	1.235	14	
5	Bangor	11	5	2	4	20	17	1.176	12	
6	Ballymena United	11	5	2	4	22	24	0.917	12	
7	Derry City	11	5	2	4	22	25	0.880	12	
8	Glentoran	11	3	2	6	23	24	0.958	8	
9	Crusaders	11	3	2	6	19	23	0.826	8	
10	Cliftonville	11	3	2	6	13	20	0.650	8	
11	Ards	11	2	2	7	20	30	0.667	6	
12	Portadown	11	2	1	8	13	25	0.520	5	

Source: Irish League Archive
(C) Champions
