= 1959–60 City Cup =

Tournament details
- Country: Northern Ireland
- Teams: 12

Final positions
- Champions: Distillery (4th win)
- Runners-up: Glenavon

Tournament statistics
- Matches played: 68
- Goals scored: 292 (4.29 per match)

The 1959–60 City Cup was the 55th edition of the City Cup, a cup competition in Northern Irish football.

The tournament was won by Distillery for the 4th time.

== Group standings ==
Pos	Team	Pld	W	D	L	GF	GA	GR	Pts	Result
1	Distillery (C)	11	9	0	2	40	16	2.500	18	Champions
2	Glenavon	11	8	1	2	35	19	1.842	17	
3	Linfield	11	6	2	3	35	23	1.522	14	
4	Crusaders	11	6	2	3	30	25	1.200	14	
5	Ballymena United	11	6	1	4	19	18	1.056	13	
6	Portadown	11	6	0	5	35	28	1.250	12	
7	Coleraine	11	4	2	5	14	19	0.737	10	
8	Glentoran	11	4	1	6	23	26	0.885	9	
9	Bangor	11	4	1	6	16	21	0.762	9	
10	Derry City	11	3	2	6	21	29	0.724	8	
11	Ards	11	2	0	9	12	31	0.387	4	
12	Cliftonville	11	1	2	8	12	37	0.324	4	

Source: Irish League Archive
(C) Champions
