= 1968–69 City Cup =

Tournament details
- Country: Northern Ireland
- Teams: 12

Final positions
- Champions: Coleraine (2nd win)
- Runners-up: Derry City

Tournament statistics
- Matches played: 68
- Goals scored: 212 (3.12 per match)

The 1968–69 City Cup was the 64th edition of the City Cup, a cup competition in Northern Irish football.

The tournament was won by Coleraine for the 2nd time.

== Group standings ==
| Pos | Team | Pld | W | D | L | GF | GA | GR | Pts | Result |
|---|---|---|---|---|---|---|---|---|---|---|
| 1 | Coleraine (C) | 11 | 8 | 2 | 1 | 24 | 6 | 4.000 | 18 | Champions |
| 2 | Derry City | 11 | 8 | 0 | 3 | 27 | 22 | 1.227 | 16 | |
| 3 | Glentoran | 11 | 7 | 0 | 4 | 26 | 19 | 1.368 | 14 | |
| 4 | Linfield | 11 | 4 | 5 | 2 | 20 | 10 | 2.000 | 13 | |
| 5 | Distillery | 11 | 4 | 3 | 4 | 10 | 10 | 1.000 | 11 | |
| 6 | Crusaders | 11 | 4 | 3 | 4 | 16 | 19 | 0.842 | 11 | |
| 7 | Ballymena United | 11 | 3 | 4 | 4 | 17 | 18 | 0.944 | 10 | |
| 8 | Ards | 11 | 4 | 2 | 5 | 19 | 21 | 0.905 | 10 | |
| 9 | Glenavon | 11 | 4 | 2 | 5 | 18 | 23 | 0.783 | 10 | |
| 10 | Bangor | 11 | 2 | 3 | 6 | 13 | 21 | 0.619 | 7 | |
| 11 | Cliftonville | 11 | 3 | 1 | 7 | 8 | 15 | 0.533 | 7 | |
| 12 | Portadown | 11 | 2 | 1 | 8 | 14 | 28 | 0.500 | 5 | |

Source: Irish League Archive
(C) Champions
