= 1962–63 City Cup =

Tournament details
- Country: Northern Ireland
- Teams: 12

Final positions
- Champions: Distillery (5th win)
- Runners-up: Linfield

Tournament statistics
- Matches played: 68
- Goals scored: 280 (4.12 per match)

The 1962–63 City Cup was the 58th edition of the City Cup, a cup competition in Northern Irish football.

The tournament was won by Distillery for the 5th time.

== Group standings ==
Pos	Team	Pld	W	D	L	GF	GA	GR	Pts	Result
1	Distillery (C)	11	8	1	2	34	13	2.615	17	Champions
2	Linfield	11	7	1	3	35	13	2.692	15	
3	Portadown	11	5	4	2	21	15	1.400	14	
4	Glenavon	11	6	2	3	31	28	1.107	14	
5	Glentoran	11	5	2	4	19	15	1.267	12	
6	Derry City	11	5	2	4	18	17	1.059	12	
7	Ballymena United	11	4	4	3	24	23	1.043	12	
8	Crusaders	11	5	2	4	23	24	0.958	12	
9	Coleraine	11	4	2	5	19	21	0.905	10	
10	Ards	11	2	2	7	31	40	0.775	6	
11	Cliftonville	11	2	1	8	12	32	0.375	5	
12	Bangor	11	1	1	9	13	73	0.178	3	

Source: Irish League Archive
(C) Champions
