= 1964–65 City Cup =

Tournament details
- Country: Northern Ireland
- Teams: 12

Final positions
- Champions: Glentoran (11th win)
- Runners-up: Derry City

Tournament statistics
- Matches played: 68
- Goals scored: 301 (4.43 per match)

The 1964–65 City Cup was the 60th edition of the City Cup, a cup competition in Northern Irish football.

The tournament was won by Glentoran for the 11th time.

== Group standings ==
Pos	Team	Pld	W	D	L	GF	GA	GR	Pts	Result
1	Glentoran (C)	11	10	1	0	43	11	3.909	21	Champions
2	Derry City	11	8	2	1	21	17	1.235	18	
3	Portadown	11	6	2	3	29	25	1.160	14	
4	Distillery	11	5	3	3	31	16	1.938	13	
5	Glenavon	11	5	2	4	36	29	1.241	12	
6	Linfield	11	5	2	4	27	23	1.174	12	
7	Ballymena United	11	4	1	6	32	28	1.143	9	
8	Coleraine	11	3	3	5	17	17	1.000	9	
9	Bangor	11	2	4	5	16	21	0.762	8	
10	Crusaders	11	3	2	6	16	23	0.696	8	
11	Ards	11	3	0	8	20	34	0.588	6	
12	Cliftonville	11	1	0	10	13	57	0.228	2	

Source: Irish League Archive
(C) Champions
