= 1958–59 City Cup =

Tournament details
- Country: Northern Ireland
- Teams: 12

Final positions
- Champions: Linfield (20th win)
- Runners-up: Glenavon

Tournament statistics
- Matches played: 69
- Goals scored: 293 (4.25 per match)

The 1958–59 City Cup was the 54th edition of the City Cup, a cup competition in Northern Irish football.

The tournament was won by Linfield for the 20th time and 2nd consecutive season. They defeated Glenavon 4–0 in a test match at Solitude after both teams finished level on points in the group standings.

== Group standings ==
| Pos | Team | Pld | W | D | L | GF | GA | GR | Pts | Result |
|---|---|---|---|---|---|---|---|---|---|---|
| 1 | Linfield | 11 | 7 | 4 | 0 | 45 | 15 | 3.000 | 18 | Advance to test match |
| 2 | Glenavon | 11 | 7 | 4 | 0 | 35 | 15 | 2.333 | 18 | Advance to test match |
| 3 | Glentoran | 11 | 7 | 3 | 1 | 31 | 16 | 1.938 | 17 | |
| 4 | Crusaders | 11 | 7 | 1 | 3 | 30 | 28 | 1.071 | 15 | |
| 5 | Portadown | 11 | 5 | 2 | 4 | 20 | 17 | 1.176 | 12 | |
| 6 | Bangor | 11 | 4 | 3 | 4 | 16 | 16 | 1.000 | 11 | |
| 7 | Coleraine | 11 | 4 | 2 | 5 | 20 | 30 | 0.667 | 10 | |
| 8 | Derry City | 11 | 3 | 2 | 6 | 20 | 18 | 1.111 | 8 | |
| 9 | Ballymena United | 11 | 4 | 0 | 7 | 24 | 29 | 0.828 | 8 | |
| 10 | Distillery | 11 | 3 | 1 | 7 | 20 | 30 | 0.667 | 7 | |
| 11 | Ards | 11 | 3 | 0 | 8 | 14 | 34 | 0.412 | 6 | |
| 12 | Cliftonville | 11 | 1 | 0 | 10 | 14 | 41 | 0.341 | 2 | |

Source: Irish League Archive

=== Test match ===
13 May 1959

| Linfield | 4–0 | Glenavon |

Solitude, Belfast
