= 1948–49 City Cup =

Tournament details
- Country: Northern Ireland
- Teams: 12

Final positions
- Champions: Belfast Celtic (10th win)
- Runners-up: Linfield

Tournament statistics
- Matches played: 68
- Goals scored: 279 (4.1 per match)

The 1948–49 City Cup was the 44th edition of the City Cup, a cup competition in Northern Irish football.

The tournament was won by Belfast Celtic for the 10th time and the 3rd consecutive edition.

== Group standings ==
Pos	Team	Pld	W	D	L	GF	GA	GR	Pts	Result
1	Belfast Celtic (C)	11	9	2	0	40	9	4.444	20	Champions
2	Linfield	11	8	2	1	33	16	2.063	18	
3	Portadown	11	7	1	3	27	21	1.286	15	
4	Glenavon	11	5	4	2	29	19	1.526	14	
5	Glentoran	11	5	3	3	26	17	1.529	13	
6	Ards	11	4	1	6	22	23	0.957	9	
7	Ballymena United	11	4	1	6	20	27	0.741	9	
8	Derry City	11	4	1	6	22	31	0.710	9	
9	Bangor	11	4	0	7	23	35	0.657	8	
10	Distillery	11	3	1	7	20	31	0.645	7	
11	Coleraine	11	1	3	7	16	31	0.516	5	
12	Cliftonville	11	2	1	8	11	29	0.379	5	

Source: Irish League Archive
(C) Champions
