= 1904–05 City Cup =

Tournament details
- Country: Ireland
- Date: 1 October 1904 – 24 April 1905
- Teams: 5

Final positions
- Champions: Distillery (1st win)
- Runners-up: Glentoran

Tournament statistics
- Matches played: 20
- Goals scored: 45 (2.25 per match)

The 1904–05 City Cup was the 11th edition of the City Cup, a cup competition in Irish football.

The tournament was won by Distillery for the first time.

== Group standings ==
Pos	Team	Pld	W	D	L	GF	GA	GR	Pts	Result
1	Distillery (C)	8	5	3	0	10	4	2.500	13	Champions
2	Glentoran	8	5	1	2	16	4	4.000	11	
3	Linfield	8	2	2	4	9	9	1.000	6	
4	Belfast Celtic	8	1	3	4	6	15	0.400	5	
5	Cliftonville	8	1	3	4	4	13	0.308	5	

Source: Irish League Archive
(C) Champions

== Results ==
Home \ Away	CEL	CLI	DIS	GLT	LIN
Belfast Celtic		3–0	0–0	0–4	1–1
Cliftonville	0–0		1–2	0–1	1–1
Distillery	3–1	0–0		1–0	1–0
Glentoran	4–0	5–0	1–1		1–0
Linfield	3–1	1–2	1–2	2–0	

Source: Irish League Archive
Legend: Blue = home team win; Yellow = draw; Red = away team win.
