= 1950–51 City Cup =

Tournament details
- Country: Northern Ireland
- Teams: 12

Final positions
- Champions: Glentoran (8th win)
- Runners-up: Linfield

Tournament statistics
- Matches played: 68
- Goals scored: 268 (3.94 per match)

The 1950–51 City Cup was the 46th edition of the City Cup, a cup competition in Northern Irish football.

The tournament was won by Glentoran for the 8th time.

== Group standings ==
Pos	Team	Pld	W	D	L	GF	GA	GR	Pts	Result
1	Glentoran (C)	11	9	2	0	34	7	4.857	20	Champions
2	Linfield	11	6	4	1	31	20	1.550	16	
3	Coleraine	11	7	1	3	26	26	1.000	15	
4	Glenavon	11	5	3	3	35	20	1.750	13	
5	Distillery	11	5	3	3	22	16	1.375	13	
6	Ballymena United	11	5	2	4	18	22	0.818	12	
7	Bangor	11	3	4	4	21	18	1.167	10	
8	Crusaders	11	4	1	6	17	26	0.654	9	
9	Portadown	11	1	6	4	13	16	0.813	8	
10	Derry City	11	3	2	6	17	21	0.810	8	
11	Ards	11	1	3	7	15	33	0.455	5	
12	Cliftonville	11	1	1	9	19	43	0.442	3	

Source: Irish League Archive
(C) Champions
