= 1905–06 City Cup =

Tournament details
- Country: Ireland
- Date: 30 September 1905 – 25 August 1906
- Teams: 6

Final positions
- Champions: Belfast Celtic (1st win)
- Runners-up: Cliftonville

Tournament statistics
- Matches played: 33
- Goals scored: 74 (2.24 per match)

The 1905–06 City Cup was the 12th edition of the City Cup, a cup competition in Irish football.

The tournament was won by Belfast Celtic for the first time. They defeated Linfield and Cliftonville in separate test matches after all three teams finished level on points in the table.

== Group standings ==
Pos	Team	Pld	W	D	L	GF	GA	GR	Pts	Result
1	Belfast Celtic	10	5	2	3	13	12	1.083	12	Advance to test match round-robin
2	Cliftonville	10	5	2	3	11	6	1.833	12	Advance to test match round-robin
3	Linfield	10	4	4	2	8	6	1.333	12	Advance to test match round-robin
4	Distillery	10	4	2	4	7	9	0.778	10	
5	Glentoran	10	2	5	3	18	16	1.125	9	
6	Shelbourne	10	2	1	7	10	18	0.556	5	

Source: Irish League Archive

== Results ==
=== Group ===
Home \ Away	CEL	CLI	DIS	GLT	LIN	SHL
Belfast Celtic		1–0	1–2	3–2	0–0	3–2
Cliftonville	0–1		2–0	1–1	0–0	3–0
Distillery	1–0	1–0		2–2	0–0	0–2
Glentoran	2–2	1–2	0–1		4–1	3–1
Linfield	2–0	0–1	1–0	1–1		2–0
Shelbourne	1–2	1–2	1–0	2–2	0–1	

Source: Irish League Archive
Legend: Blue = home team win; Yellow = draw; Red = away team win.

=== Test match round-robin ===
As Belfast Celtic, Cliftonville and Linfield finished level on points, a round-robin was played. Belfast Celtic won both their matches and therefore won the tournament.

7 May 1906

Belfast Celtic	2–0	Linfield

Grosvenor Park, Belfast
12 May 1906

Belfast Celtic	2–0	Cliftonville

Solitude, Belfast

=== 2nd/3rd place playoff ===
19 May 1906

Cliftonville	2–1	Linfield

Grosvenor Park, Belfast
