= Bobby Averell =

Association football player from Northern Ireland

Personal information
- Full name: Robert Averell
- Date of birth: 1947 (age 78–79)
- Place of birth: Magherafelt, Northern Ireland
- Position: Central defender

Senior career*
Years	Team	Apps	(Gls)
- Coleraine
1968–1978	Ballymena United	154	(9)
1972	→ Toronto Metros (loan)	9	(0)
1973	→ Toronto Metros (loan)	15	(2)

International career
1969–1970	Northern Ireland Amateurs	4	(0)
- * Club domestic league appearances and goals

Robert Averell (born 1947) is a Northern Irish retired footballer, best remembered for his decade as a central defender in the Irish League with Ballymena United. He also played in the North American Soccer League for Toronto Metros.

== Career statistics ==
Appearances and goals by club, season and competition
Club	Season	League			National cup (Note: Includes Irish Cup)		Other		Total	
Club	Season	Division	Apps	Goals	Apps	Goals	Apps	Goals	Apps	Goals
Ballymena United	1968–69	Irish League	22	2	2	0	20 (Note: 10 appearances and 1 goal in City Cup, 8 appearances in Ulster Cup, 1 appearance in Gold Cup, 1 appearance in County Antrim Shield)	1	44	3
Ballymena United	1969–70	Irish League	19	0	4	0	20 (Note: 11 appearances in Ulster Cup, 4 appearances in City Cup, 3 appearances in Gold Cup, 1 appearance in County Antrim Shield, 1 appearance in Blaxnit Cup)	0	43	0
Ballymena United	1970–71	Irish League	20	0	2	0	18 (Note: 8 appearances and 1 goal in City Cup, 5 appearances in Ulster Cup, 3 appearances in Gold Cup, 2 appearances in County Antrim Shield)	0	40	0
Ballymena United	1971–72	Irish League	16	0	1	0	22 (Note: 9 appearances and 1 goal in Ulster Cup, 6 appearances and 1 goal in Texaco Cup, 6 appearances and 1 goal in City Cup, 1 appearance in County Antrim Shield)	3	39	3
Ballymena United	1972–73	Irish League	12	1	2	0	1 (Note: Appearance in County Antrim Shield)	0	13	1
Ballymena United	1973–74	Irish League	20	2	6	0	15 (Note: 5 appearances and 1 goal in Ulster Cup, 5 appearances in City Cup, 2 appearances in Gold Cup, 2 appearances in Blaxnit Cup, 1 appearance in County Antrim Shield)	1	0	0
Ballymena United	1974–75	Irish League	22	2	1	0	19 (Note: 10 appearances and 2 goals in Ulster Cup, 5 appearances in City Cup, 3 appearances in Gold Cup, 1 appearance in County Antrim Shield)	2	42	4
Ballymena United	1975–76	Irish League	22	2	1	0	21 (Note: 8 appearances in Ulster Cup, 5 appearances in City Cup, 4 appearances and 1 goal in County Antrim Shield, 4 appearances in Gold Cup)	1	44	3
Ballymena United	1976–77	Irish League	0	0	0	0	13 (Note: 10 appearances in Ulster Cup, 3 appearances in Gold Cup)	0	13	0
Ballymena United	1977–78	Irish League	1	0	0	0	6 (Note: Appearances in Ulster Cup)	0	6	0
Ballymena United	Total		154	9	19	0	155	8	328	17
Toronto Metros	1972	North American Soccer League	9	0	—		—		9	0
Toronto Metros	1973	North American Soccer League	15	2	—		—		15	2
Toronto Metros	Total		24	2	—		—		24	2
Career total			178	11	19	0	155	8	352	19

== Honours ==
Ballymena United

- City Cup: 1971–72
- Gold Cup: 1974–75
- County Antrim Shield: 1975–76
