= 1931–32 City Cup =

Tournament details
- Country: Northern Ireland
- Teams: 14

Final positions
- Champions: Glentoran (7th win)
- Runners-up: Belfast Celtic

Tournament statistics
- Matches played: 91
- Goals scored: 388 (4.26 per match)

The 1931–32 City Cup was the 34th edition of the City Cup, a cup competition in Northern Irish football.

The tournament was won by Glentoran for the 7th time.

== Group standings ==
Pos	Team	Pld	W	D	L	GF	GA	GR	Pts	Result
1	Glentoran (C)	13	11	1	1	42	13	3.231	23	Champions
2	Belfast Celtic	13	8	3	2	33	17	1.941	19	
3	Coleraine	13	8	2	3	31	22	1.409	18	
4	Derry City	13	7	3	3	36	19	1.895	17	
5	Linfield	13	8	1	4	33	24	1.375	17	
6	Ballymena	13	8	1	4	30	23	1.304	17	
7	Bangor	13	6	2	5	28	35	0.800	14	
8	Larne	13	5	3	5	25	28	0.893	13	
9	Cliftonville	13	4	3	6	24	27	0.889	11	
10	Ards	13	4	3	6	25	34	0.735	11	
11	Portadown	13	3	2	8	17	25	0.680	8	
12	Distillery	13	2	3	8	28	37	0.757	7	
13	Glenavon	13	2	1	10	22	39	0.564	5	
14	Newry Town	13	1	0	12	14	45	0.311	2	

Source: Irish League Archive
(C) Champions
