= 1972–73 City Cup =

Tournament details
- Country: Northern Ireland
- Teams: 11

Final positions
- Champions: Glentoran (14th win)
- Runners-up: Coleraine

Tournament statistics
- Matches played: 26
- Goals scored: 84 (3.23 per match)

The 1972–73 City Cup was the 68th edition of the City Cup, a cup competition in Northern Irish football.

The tournament was won by Glentoran for the 14th time after they defeated Coleraine 2–0 in the final at the Ballymena Showgrounds.

== Group standings ==
=== Section A ===
Pos	Team	Pld	W	D	L	GF	GA	GR	Pts	Result
1	Glentoran	5	4	1	0	10	1	10.000	9	Advance to final
2	Portadown	5	4	1	0	12	6	2.000	9	
3	Ards	5	2	0	3	8	8	1.000	4	
4	Glenavon	5	2	0	3	4	9	0.444	4	
5	Distillery	5	1	0	4	7	10	0.700	2	
6	Bangor	5	1	0	4	7	14	0.500	2	

Source: Irish League Archive

=== Section B ===
Pos	Team	Pld	W	D	L	GF	GA	GR	Pts	Result
1	Coleraine	4	3	1	0	8	4	2.000	7	Advance to final
2	Crusaders	4	2	2	0	14	5	2.800	6	
3	Linfield	4	2	0	2	7	5	1.400	4	
4	Ballymena United	4	1	1	2	7	8	0.875	3	
5	Cliftonville	4	0	0	4	1	15	0.067	0	

Source: Irish League Archive

== Final ==
2 December 1972

Glentoran	2–0	Coleraine
Morrow 72'; Dickson 79'	Report

The Showgrounds, Ballymena
