= 1920–21 City Cup =

Tournament details
- Country: Ireland
- Date: 5 February 1921 – 14 May 1921
- Teams: 5

Final positions
- Champions: Glenavon (1st win)
- Runners-up: Glentoran

Tournament statistics
- Matches played: 20
- Goals scored: 35 (1.75 per match)

The 1920–21 City Cup was the 23rd edition of the City Cup, a cup competition in Irish football.

The tournament was won by Glenavon for the 1st time.

== Group standings ==
Pos	Team	Pld	W	D	L	GF	GA	GR	Pts	Result
1	Glenavon (C)	8	5	2	1	11	5	2.200	12	Champions
2	Glentoran	8	4	3	1	9	2	4.500	11	
3	Linfield	8	4	2	2	8	5	1.600	10	
4	Distillery	8	1	2	5	5	12	0.417	4	
5	Cliftonville	8	1	1	6	2	11	0.182	3	

Source: Irish League Archive
(C) Champions

== Results ==
Home \ Away	CLI	DIS	GLA	GLT	LIN
Cliftonville		0–2	1–2	0–0	0–1
Distillery	0–1		1–1	0–2	1–4
Glenavon	3–0	2–1		1–0	1–0
Glentoran	2–0	0–0	2–1		3–0
Linfield	1–0	2–0	0–0	0–0	

Source: Irish League Archive
Legend: Blue = home team win; Yellow = draw; Red = away team win.
