= 1925–26 City Cup =

Tournament details
- Country: Northern Ireland
- Teams: 12

Final positions
- Champions: Belfast Celtic (3rd win)
- Runners-up: Queen's Island

Tournament statistics
- Matches played: 66
- Goals scored: 194 (2.94 per match)

The 1925–26 City Cup was the 28th edition of the City Cup, a cup competition in Northern Irish football.

The tournament was won by Belfast Celtic for the 3rd time.

== Group standings ==
Pos	Team	Pld	W	D	L	GF	GA	GR	Pts	Result
1	Belfast Celtic (C)	11	8	1	2	32	18	1.778	17	Champions
2	Queen's Island	11	6	4	1	21	14	1.500	16	
3	Glentoran	11	6	3	2	30	17	1.765	15	
4	Distillery	11	5	4	2	18	13	1.385	14	
5	Newry Town	11	5	3	3	15	18	0.833	13	
6	Cliftonville	11	5	2	4	15	16	0.938	12	
7	Portadown	11	5	1	5	29	23	1.261	11	
8	Glenavon	11	4	2	5	16	15	1.067	10	
9	Ards	11	4	1	6	18	19	0.947	9	
10	Larne	11	2	2	7	15	30	0.500	6	
11	Linfield	11	2	1	8	16	21	0.762	5	
12	Barn	11	1	2	8	10	31	0.323	4	

Source: Irish League Archive
(C) Champions
