= 1949–50 City Cup =

Tournament details
- Country: Northern Ireland
- Teams: 12

Final positions
- Champions: Linfield (17th win)
- Runners-up: Derry City

Tournament statistics
- Matches played: 68
- Goals scored: 279 (4.1 per match)

The 1949–50 City Cup was the 45th edition of the City Cup, a cup competition in Northern Irish football.

The tournament was won by Linfield for the 17th time.

== Group standings ==
Pos	Team	Pld	W	D	L	GF	GA	GR	Pts	Result
1	Linfield (C)	11	8	1	2	35	12	2.917	17	Champions
2	Derry City	11	7	2	2	33	22	1.500	16	
3	Ards	11	7	1	3	30	16	1.875	15	
4	Distillery	11	6	3	2	17	12	1.417	15	
5	Bangor	11	5	1	5	20	15	1.333	11	
6	Glentoran	11	5	1	5	15	14	1.071	11	
7	Crusaders	11	4	2	5	13	16	0.813	10	
8	Ballymena United	11	3	4	4	12	18	0.667	10	
9	Glenavon	11	3	2	6	20	23	0.870	8	
10	Cliftonville	11	2	3	6	12	26	0.462	7	
11	Coleraine	11	2	2	7	19	34	0.559	6	
12	Portadown	11	2	2	7	14	32	0.438	6	

Source: Irish League Archive
(C) Champions
