= 1929–30 City Cup =

Tournament details
- Country: Northern Ireland
- Teams: 14

Final positions
- Champions: Belfast Celtic (5th win)
- Runners-up: Glentoran

Tournament statistics
- Matches played: 92
- Goals scored: 390 (4.24 per match)

The 1929–30 City Cup was the 32nd edition of the City Cup, a cup competition in Northern Irish football.

The tournament was won by Belfast Celtic for the 5th time. They defeated Glentoran 3–1 in a test match at Grosvenor Park after both teams finished level on points in the group standings.

== Group standings ==
Pos	Team	Pld	W	D	L	GF	GA	GR	Pts	Result
1	Belfast Celtic	13	9	2	2	32	12	2.667	20	Advance to test match
2	Glentoran	13	9	2	2	46	26	1.769	20	Advance to test match
3	Derry City	13	7	4	2	30	18	1.667	18	
4	Glenavon	13	8	2	3	37	26	1.423	18	
5	Linfield	13	6	2	5	30	22	1.364	14	
6	Bangor	13	6	2	5	30	29	1.034	14	
7	Ards	13	5	3	5	22	22	1.000	13	
8	Portadown	13	6	1	6	25	27	0.926	13	
9	Distillery	13	5	1	7	33	34	0.971	11	
10	Ballymena	13	4	3	6	24	25	0.960	11	
11	Coleraine	13	4	2	7	22	26	0.846	10	
12	Larne	13	4	0	9	21	45	0.467	8	
13	Cliftonville	13	2	2	9	14	30	0.467	6	
14	Newry Town	13	3	0	10	20	44	0.455	6	

Source: Irish League Archive

=== Test match ===
19 May 1930

Belfast Celtic	3–1	Glentoran

Grosvenor Park, Belfast
