= 1914–15 City Cup =

Tournament details
- Country: Ireland
- Date: 31 October 1914 – 12 May 1915
- Teams: 8

Final positions
- Champions: Glentoran (6th win)
- Runners-up: Linfield

Tournament statistics
- Matches played: 55
- Goals scored: 172 (3.13 per match)

The 1914–15 City Cup was the 21st edition of the City Cup, a cup competition in Irish football.

The tournament was won by Glentoran for the 6th time and 2nd consecutive year. One match between Cliftonville and Bohemians was unplayed.

== Group standings ==
Pos	Team	Pld	W	D	L	GF	GA	GR	Pts	Result
1	Glentoran (C)	14	10	2	2	27	13	2.077	22	Champions
2	Linfield	14	9	3	2	28	13	2.154	21	
3	Distillery	14	7	5	2	27	15	1.800	19	
4	Belfast Celtic	14	6	5	3	23	14	1.643	17	
5	Shelbourne	14	5	4	5	18	13	1.385	14	
6	Bohemians	13	3	3	7	26	33	0.788	9	
7	Cliftonville	13	2	3	8	14	23	0.609	7	
8	Glenavon	14	0	1	13	9	48	0.188	1	

Source: Irish League Archive
(C) Champions

== Results ==
Home \ Away	BEL	BOH	CLI	DIS	GLA	GLT	LIN	SHL
Belfast Celtic		1–1	1–1	4–0	2–2	3–1	2–0	1–0
Bohemians	1–1		2–0	1–1	6–0	1–3	3–5	1–3
Cliftonville	1–3			1–1	5–0	2–3	0–1	0–0
Distillery	2–1	7–3	3–0		3–0	0–0	2–0	1–0
Glenavon	0–3	2–4	1–2	1–4		2–3	1–4	0–2
Glentoran	3–0	4–1	4–1	1–0	1–0		1–3	2–0
Linfield	1–0	4–1	2–0	2–2	3–0	0–0		2–0
Shelbourne	1–1	2–1	2–1	1–1	6–0	0–1	1–1	

Source: Irish League Archive
Legend: Blue = home team win; Yellow = draw; Red = away team win.
