= 1937–38 City Cup =

Tournament details
- Country: Northern Ireland
- Teams: 14

Final positions
- Champions: Linfield (16th win)
- Runners-up: Derry City

Tournament statistics
- Matches played: 92
- Goals scored: 346 (3.76 per match)

The 1937–38 City Cup was the 40th edition of the City Cup, a cup competition in Northern Irish football.

The tournament was won by Linfield for the 16th time. They defeated Derry City 3–2 in a test match at Solitude after both teams finished level on points in the group standings.

== Group standings ==
Pos	Team	Pld	W	D	L	GF	GA	GR	Pts	Result
1	Linfield	13	10	1	2	35	11	3.182	21	Advance to test match
2	Derry City	13	9	3	1	29	13	2.231	21	Advance to test match
3	Belfast Celtic	13	8	3	2	32	15	2.133	19	
4	Distillery	13	7	3	3	25	19	1.316	17	
5	Glenavon	13	7	1	5	19	18	1.056	15	
6	Bangor	13	6	2	5	26	18	1.444	14	
7	Newry Town	13	5	3	5	27	21	1.286	13	
8	Ballymena United	13	5	3	5	27	22	1.227	13	
9	Portadown	13	6	0	7	27	21	1.286	12	
10	Larne	13	3	5	5	19	31	0.613	11	
11	Ards	13	3	2	8	20	45	0.444	8	
12	Cliftonville	13	2	2	9	17	28	0.607	6	
13	Glentoran	13	1	4	8	19	35	0.543	6	
14	Coleraine	13	2	2	9	19	44	0.432	6	

Source: Irish League Archive

=== Test match ===
31 August 1938

Linfield	3–2	Derry City

Solitude, Belfast
