= 1960–61 City Cup =

Tournament details
- Country: Northern Ireland
- Teams: 12

Final positions
- Champions: Glenavon (4th win)
- Runners-up: Ballymena United

Tournament statistics
- Matches played: 68
- Goals scored: 288 (4.24 per match)

The 1960–61 City Cup was the 56th edition of the City Cup, a cup competition in Northern Irish football.

The tournament was won by Glenavon for the 4th time.

== Group standings ==
Pos	Team	Pld	W	D	L	GF	GA	GR	Pts	Result
1	Glenavon (C)	11	8	2	1	46	24	1.917	18	Champions
2	Ballymena United	11	7	2	2	33	19	1.737	16	
3	Glentoran	11	7	1	3	28	13	2.154	15	
4	Portadown	11	6	2	3	19	12	1.583	14	
5	Ards	11	5	3	3	37	21	1.762	13	
6	Linfield	11	4	4	3	24	22	1.091	12	
7	Distillery	11	4	2	5	24	24	1.000	10	
8	Crusaders	11	3	3	5	11	18	0.611	9	
9	Bangor	11	4	0	7	16	26	0.615	8	
10	Derry City	11	2	3	6	17	27	0.630	7	
11	Coleraine	11	3	0	8	16	34	0.471	6	
12	Cliftonville	11	1	2	8	17	48	0.354	4	

Source: Irish League Archive
(C) Champions
