= 1930–31 City Cup =

Tournament details
- Country: Northern Ireland
- Teams: 14

Final positions
- Champions: Belfast Celtic (6th win)
- Runners-up: Linfield

Tournament statistics
- Matches played: 91
- Goals scored: 415 (4.56 per match)

The 1930–31 City Cup was the 33rd edition of the City Cup, a cup competition in Northern Irish football.

The tournament was won by Belfast Celtic for the 6th time and 2nd consecutive year.

== Group standings ==
Pos	Team	Pld	W	D	L	GF	GA	GR	Pts	Result
1	Belfast Celtic (C)	13	10	3	0	52	12	4.333	23	Champions
2	Linfield	13	11	0	2	37	17	2.176	22	
3	Glentoran	13	9	1	3	50	23	2.174	19	
4	Glenavon	13	5	6	2	30	24	1.250	16	
5	Derry City	13	6	3	4	29	21	1.381	15	
6	Coleraine	13	6	3	4	27	23	1.174	15	
7	Ballymena	13	5	3	5	27	27	1.000	13	
8	Cliftonville	13	5	3	5	23	25	0.920	13	
9	Ards	13	3	5	5	23	27	0.852	11	
10	Portadown	13	3	3	7	23	33	0.697	9	
11	Bangor	13	3	2	8	18	44	0.409	8	
12	Distillery	13	3	1	9	23	34	0.676	7	
13	Larne	13	3	0	10	26	52	0.500	6	
14	Newry Town	13	2	1	10	17	43	0.395	5	

Source: Irish League Archive
(C) Champions
