= 1899–1900 City Cup =

Tournament details
- Country: Ireland
- Date: 25 November 1899 – 14 April 1900
- Teams: 5

Final positions
- Champions: Linfield (4th win)
- Runners-up: Distillery

Tournament statistics
- Matches played: 20
- Goals scored: 72 (3.6 per match)

The 1899–1900 City Cup was the sixth edition of the City Cup, a cup competition in Irish football.

The tournament was won by Linfield for the fourth time.

== Group standings ==
| Pos | Team | Pld | W | D | L | GF | GA | GR | Pts | Result |
|---|---|---|---|---|---|---|---|---|---|---|
| 1 | Linfield (C) | 8 | 6 | 2 | 0 | 19 | 6 | 3.167 | 14 | Champions |
| 2 | Distillery | 8 | 5 | 1 | 2 | 21 | 8 | 2.625 | 11 | |
| 3 | Celtic | 8 | 3 | 1 | 4 | 11 | 17 | 0.647 | 7 | |
| 4 | Glentoran | 8 | 1 | 3 | 4 | 11 | 19 | 0.579 | 5 | |
| 5 | Cliftonville | 8 | 1 | 1 | 6 | 9 | 21 | 0.429 | 3 | |

Source: Irish League Archive
(C) Champions

== Results ==
| Home \ Away | CEL | CLI | DIS | GLT | LIN |
|---|---|---|---|---|---|
| Celtic | | 3–0 | 2–0 | 3–2 | 1–4 |
| Cliftonville | 4–0 | | 0–3 | 1–1 | 1–4 |
| Distillery | 2–0 | 4–1 | | 8–1 | 0–0 |
| Glentoran | 2–2 | 3–1 | 1–2 | | 0–1 |
| Linfield | 3–0 | 3–1 | 3–2 | 1–1 | |

Source: Irish League Archive
Legend: Blue = home team win; Yellow = draw; Red = away team win.
