= 1912–13 City Cup =

Tournament details
- Country: Ireland
- Date: 30 October 1912 – 12 May 1913
- Teams: 7

Final positions
- Champions: Distillery (2nd win)
- Runners-up: Glenavon

Tournament statistics
- Matches played: 42
- Goals scored: 120 (2.86 per match)

The 1912–13 City Cup was the 19th edition of the City Cup, a cup competition in Irish football.

The tournament was won by Distillery for the 2nd time.

== Group standings ==
Pos	Team	Pld	W	D	L	GF	GA	GR	Pts	Result
1	Distillery (C)	12	8	3	1	25	12	2.083	19	Champions
2	Glenavon	12	7	0	5	17	14	1.214	14	
3	Linfield	12	5	3	4	16	14	1.143	13	
4	Glentoran	12	5	2	5	20	18	1.111	12	
5	Cliftonville	12	5	1	6	14	19	0.737	11	
6	Shelbourne	12	3	2	7	13	19	0.684	8	
7	Belfast Celtic	12	3	1	8	15	24	0.625	7	

Source: Irish League Archive
(C) Champions

== Results ==
Home \ Away	CEL	CLI	DIS	GLA	GLT	LIN	SHL
Belfast Celtic		1–2	2–3	2–1	0–2	2–1	2–0
Cliftonville	3–1		0–3	0–3	3–1	0–0	3–1
Distillery	2–1	2–1		4–1	1–1	1–0	4–0
Glenavon	3–1	0–1	2–0		2–0	1–0	1–0
Glentoran	2–2	4–1	0–2	3–1		4–3	1–0
Linfield	2–1	1–0	2–2	2–0	1–0		2–1
Shelbourne	3–0	2–0	1–1	1–2	2–1	2–2	

Source: Irish League Archive
Legend: Blue = home team win; Yellow = draw; Red = away team win.
