= 1924–25 City Cup =

Tournament details
- Country: Northern Ireland
- Teams: 12

Final positions
- Champions: Queen's Island (3rd win)
- Runners-up: Glentoran

Tournament statistics
- Matches played: 69
- Goals scored: 194 (2.81 per match)

The 1924–25 City Cup was the 27th edition of the City Cup, a cup competition in Northern Irish football.

The tournament was won by Queen's Island for the 3rd time and 3rd consecutive year. They defeated Glentoran 3–2 in a second test match replay at Solitude after both teams finished level on points in the group standings.

== Group standings ==
Pos	Team	Pld	W	D	L	GF	GA	GR	Pts	Result
1	Queen's Island	11	7	3	1	20	9	2.222	17	Advance to test match
2	Glentoran	11	8	1	2	25	15	1.667	17	Advance to test match
3	Linfield	11	5	4	2	23	9	2.556	14	
4	Distillery	11	6	1	4	18	11	1.636	13	
5	Glenavon	11	4	4	3	17	14	1.214	12	
6	Portadown	11	4	4	3	15	13	1.154	12	
7	Larne	11	3	4	4	15	19	0.789	10	
8	Ards	11	3	3	5	12	19	0.632	9	
9	Barn	11	2	5	4	10	16	0.625	9	
10	Cliftonville	11	2	4	5	14	24	0.583	8	
11	Belfast Celtic	11	3	1	7	9	12	0.750	7	
12	Newry Town	11	1	2	8	9	26	0.346	4	

Source: Irish League Archive

=== Test match ===
14 May 1925

Queen's Island	0–0	Glentoran

Windsor Park, Belfast

=== Replay ===
20 May 1925

Queen's Island	1–1	Glentoran

Windsor Park, Belfast

=== Second replay ===
2 September 1925

Queen's Island	3–2	Glentoran

Solitude, Belfast
