= 1900–01 City Cup =

Tournament details
- Country: Ireland
- Date: 24 November 1900 – 4 May 1901
- Teams: 5

Final positions
- Champions: Linfield (5th win)
- Runners-up: Cliftonville

Tournament statistics
- Matches played: 20
- Goals scored: 61 (3.05 per match)

The 1900–01 City Cup was the seventh edition of the City Cup, a cup competition in Irish football.

The tournament was won by Linfield for the fifth time and second consecutive year.

== Group standings ==
Pos	Team	Pld	W	D	L	GF	GA	GR	Pts	Result
1	Linfield (C)	8	5	2	1	15	9	1.667	12	Champions
2	Cliftonville	8	4	2	2	15	8	1.875	10	
3	Glentoran	8	3	2	3	11	11	1.000	8	
4	Distillery	8	3	0	5	12	12	1.000	6	
5	Celtic	8	2	0	6	9	22	0.409	4	

Source: Irish League Archive
(C) Champions

== Results ==
Home \ Away	CEL	CLI	DIS	GLT	LIN
Celtic		3–0	2–1	2–4	1–2
Cliftonville	5–0		3–1	1–1	0–0
Distillery	3–0	2–1		3–1	1–2
Glentoran	2–1	0–1	1–0		1–2
Linfield	5–0	1–4	2–1	1–1	

Source: Irish League Archive
Legend: Blue = home team win; Yellow = draw; Red = away team win.
