= 1974–75 City Cup =

Tournament details
- Country: Northern Ireland
- Teams: 12

Final positions
- Champions: Glentoran (15th win)
- Runners-up: Linfield

Tournament statistics
- Matches played: 31
- Goals scored: 105 (3.39 per match)

The 1974–75 City Cup was the 70th edition of the City Cup, a cup competition in Northern Irish football.

The tournament was won by Glentoran for the 15th time after they defeated Linfield 3–1 in the final at Windsor Park.

== Group standings ==
=== Section A ===
Pos	Team	Pld	W	D	L	GF	GA	GR	Pts	Result
1	Glentoran	5	4	1	0	13	5	2.600	9	Advance to final
2	Portadown	5	2	3	0	9	6	1.500	7	
3	Ards	5	2	0	3	10	9	1.111	4	
4	Glenavon	5	1	2	2	8	11	0.727	4	
5	Bangor	5	1	2	2	7	10	0.700	4	
6	Distillery	5	0	2	3	3	9	0.333	2	

Source: Irish League Archive

=== Section B ===
Pos	Team	Pld	W	D	L	GF	GA	GR	Pts	Result
1	Linfield	5	4	1	0	12	3	4.000	9	Advance to final
2	Crusaders	5	3	1	1	11	7	1.571	7	
3	Ballymena United	5	2	1	2	7	7	1.000	5	
4	Coleraine	5	2	1	2	9	11	0.818	5	
5	Cliftonville	5	1	0	4	5	9	0.556	2	
6	Larne	5	1	0	4	7	14	0.500	2	

Source: Irish League Archive

== Final ==
15 October 1975

Glentoran	3 – 1	Linfield
Jamison 10', 44', 63'	Report	Crozier 45'

Windsor Park, Belfast
Referee: Malcolm Wright (Portadown)
