= 1894–95 City Cup =

Tournament details
- Country: Ireland
- Date: 20 October 1894 – 27 April 1895
- Teams: 4

Final positions
- Champions: Linfield (1st win)
- Runners-up: Cliftonville

Tournament statistics
- Matches played: 12
- Goals scored: 61 (5.08 per match)

The 1894–95 City Cup was the inaugural edition of the City Cup, a cup competition in Irish football.

The tournament was won by Linfield for the first time.

== Group standings ==
Pos	Team	Pld	W	D	L	GF	GA	GR	Pts	Result
1	Linfield (C)	6	5	0	1	25	9	2.778	10	Champions
2	Cliftonville	6	3	1	2	16	14	1.143	7	
3	Glentoran	6	2	1	3	13	18	0.722	5	
4	Distillery	6	1	0	5	7	20	0.350	2	

Source: Irish League Archive
(C) Champions

== Results ==
Home \ Away	CLI	DIS	GLT	LIN
Cliftonville		5–0	5–2	0–1
Distillery	2–3		1–2	1–3
Glentoran	2–2	1–2		4–3
Linfield	7–1	6–1	5–2	

Source: Irish League Archive
Legend: Blue = home team win; Yellow = draw; Red = away team win.
