= 1918–19 Belfast City Cup =

Tournament details
- Country: Ireland
- Date: 23 November 1918 – 19 May 1919
- Teams: 6

Final positions
- Champions: Belfast Celtic (1st win); Glentoran (3rd win)

Tournament statistics
- Matches played: 31
- Goals scored: 90 (2.9 per match)

The 1918–19 Belfast City Cup was the 4th and final edition of the Belfast City Cup, a cup competition in Irish football. It replaced the City Cup, which was suspended due to World War I. This was the final season the Belfast City Cup was held, as the City Cup resumed the following season.

Belfast Celtic and Glentoran shared the trophy after they drew 1–1 in a test match at Windsor Park. A replay was never played.

== Group standings ==
Pos	Team	Pld	W	D	L	GF	GA	GR	Pts	Result
1	Glentoran	10	6	3	1	22	10	2.200	15	Advance to test match
2	Belfast Celtic	10	6	3	1	16	7	2.286	15	Advance to test match
3	Linfield	10	5	1	4	14	10	1.400	11	
4	Cliftonville	10	3	3	4	11	14	0.786	9	
5	Distillery	10	1	5	4	17	18	0.944	7	
6	Belfast United	10	1	1	8	8	29	0.276	3	

Source: British Newspaper Archive

== Results ==
=== Group ===
Home \ Away	BCE	BUT	CLI	DIS	GLT	LIN
Belfast Celtic		3–1	2–0	3–0	0–0	1–0
Belfast United	0–1		1–2	1–8	1–3	1–0
Cliftonville	0–2	2–0		2–2	1–3	1–2
Distillery	2–2	1–1	0–0		1–4	1–2
Glentoran	3–1	3–0	2–2	2–2		2–1
Linfield	1–1	6–2	0–1	1–0	1–0	

Source: Irish League Archive
Legend: Blue = home team win; Yellow = draw; Red = away team win.

=== Test match ===
19 May 1919

Belfast Celtic	1–1	Glentoran
Hamill (pen.); Ferris (red card)	Report	Lyner

Windsor Park, Belfast
