= 1966–67 City Cup =

Tournament details
- Country: Northern Ireland
- Teams: 12

Final positions
- Champions: Glentoran (12th win)
- Runners-up: Linfield

Tournament statistics
- Matches played: 68
- Goals scored: 224 (3.29 per match)

The 1966–67 City Cup was the 62nd edition of the City Cup, a cup competition in Northern Irish football.

The tournament was won by Glentoran for the 12th time.

== Group standings ==
Pos	Team	Pld	W	D	L	GF	GA	GR	Pts	Result
1	Glentoran (C)	11	10	0	1	30	4	7.500	20	Champions
2	Linfield	11	8	1	2	33	20	1.650	17	
3	Portadown	11	6	1	4	18	17	1.059	13	
4	Coleraine	11	4	4	3	20	14	1.429	12	
5	Derry City	11	6	0	5	23	20	1.150	12	
6	Ballymena United	11	4	3	4	18	17	1.059	11	
7	Glenavon	11	4	3	4	15	15	1.000	11	
8	Crusaders	11	4	1	6	24	27	0.889	9	
9	Distillery	11	3	3	5	14	22	0.636	9	
10	Bangor	11	3	2	6	10	23	0.435	8	
11	Ards	11	2	2	7	9	18	0.500	6	
12	Cliftonville	11	2	0	9	10	27	0.370	4	

Source: Irish League Archive
(C) Champions
