= 1922–23 City Cup =

Tournament details
- Country: Northern Ireland
- Date: 11 November 1922 – 18 May 1923
- Teams: 6

Final positions
- Champions: Queen's Island (1st win)
- Runners-up: Distillery

Tournament statistics
- Matches played: 30
- Goals scored: 90 (3 per match)

The 1922–23 City Cup was the 25th edition of the City Cup, a cup competition in Northern Irish football.

The tournament was won by Queen's Island for the 1st time.

== Group standings ==
Pos	Team	Pld	W	D	L	GF	GA	GR	Pts	Result
1	Queen's Island (C)	10	7	0	3	24	14	1.714	14	Champions
2	Distillery	10	5	2	3	18	14	1.286	12	
3	Glentoran	10	5	2	3	16	16	1.000	12	
4	Linfield	10	2	5	3	19	14	1.357	9	
5	Cliftonville	10	3	2	5	8	15	0.533	8	
6	Glenavon	10	1	3	6	5	17	0.294	5	

Source: Irish League Archive
(C) Champions

== Results ==
Home \ Away	CLI	DIS	GLA	GLT	LIN	QUE
Cliftonville		1–0	2–0	0–1	1–1	2–1
Distillery	4–1		1–0	3–1	2–2	4–0
Glenavon	1–1	2–0		0–1	1–1	0–3
Glentoran	2–0	4–1	1–1		1–1	2–3
Linfield	3–0	1–1	5–0	2–3		2–3
Queen's Island	2–0	2–3	2–0	6–0	2–1	

Source: Irish League Archive
Legend: Blue = home team win; Yellow = draw; Red = away team win.
