= 1935–36 City Cup =

Tournament details
- Country: Northern Ireland
- Teams: 14

Final positions
- Champions: Linfield (15th win)
- Runners-up: Portadown

Tournament statistics
- Matches played: 91
- Goals scored: 367 (4.03 per match)

The 1935–36 City Cup was the 38th edition of the City Cup, a cup competition in Northern Irish football.

The tournament was won by Linfield for the 15th time.

== Group standings ==
Pos	Team	Pld	W	D	L	GF	GA	GR	Pts	Result
1	Linfield (C)	13	10	1	2	39	14	2.786	21	Champions
2	Portadown	13	8	3	2	34	17	2.000	19	
3	Newry Town	13	7	4	2	29	22	1.318	18	
4	Derry City	13	7	3	3	42	18	2.333	17	
5	Belfast Celtic	13	6	4	3	33	15	2.200	16	
6	Glentoran	13	5	5	3	37	27	1.370	15	
7	Glenavon	13	6	2	5	24	23	1.043	14	
8	Distillery	13	5	3	5	17	12	1.417	13	
9	Coleraine	13	3	4	6	21	28	0.750	10	
10	Cliftonville	13	4	2	7	23	34	0.676	10	
11	Bangor	13	4	1	8	15	40	0.375	9	
12	Ballymena United	13	2	4	7	19	30	0.633	8	
13	Larne	13	3	0	10	16	39	0.410	6	
14	Ards	13	2	2	9	18	48	0.375	6	

Source: Irish League Archive
(C) Champions
