= 1915–16 Belfast City Cup =

Tournament details
- Country: Ireland
- Date: 4 December 1915 – 8 May 1916
- Teams: 6

Final positions
- Champions: Glentoran (1st win)
- Runners-up: Belfast United

Tournament statistics
- Matches played: 30
- Goals scored: 118 (3.93 per match)

The 1915–16 Belfast City Cup was the 1st edition of the Belfast City Cup, a cup competition in Irish football. It replaced the City Cup, which was suspended due to World War I.

The tournament was won by Glentoran for the 1st time. Belfast United and Glenavon played all their games away from home.

== Group standings ==
Pos	Team	Pld	W	D	L	GF	GA	GR	Pts	Result
1	Glentoran (C)	10	7	2	1	28	11	2.545	16	Champions
2	Belfast United	10	7	1	2	23	16	1.438	15	
3	Linfield	10	6	0	4	17	14	1.214	12	
4	Distillery	10	4	1	5	21	19	1.105	9	
5	Cliftonville	10	2	0	8	14	26	0.538	4	
6	Glenavon	10	2	0	8	16	33	0.485	4	

Source: Irish League Archive
(C) Champions

== Results ==
Home \ Away	BEL	CLI	DIS	GLA	GLT	LIN
Belfast United		4–1	3–1	5–2 (Note: Played at Grosvenor Park)	1–5	1–3
Cliftonville	1–2		5–3	0–2	1–3	1–2
Distillery	0–1	3–0		4–0	1–1	3–2
Glenavon	3–5 (Note: Played at Solitude)	3–2	1–2		4–5	0–2
Glentoran	0–0	4–1	2–1	5–1		3–0
Linfield	0–1	0–2	4–3	3–0	1–0	

Source: Irish League Archive
Legend: Blue = home team win; Yellow = draw; Red = away team win.
