= 1967–68 City Cup =

Tournament details
- Country: Northern Ireland
- Teams: 12

Final positions
- Champions: Linfield (23rd win)
- Runners-up: Crusaders

Tournament statistics
- Matches played: 68
- Goals scored: 224 (3.29 per match)

The 1967–68 City Cup was the 63rd edition of the City Cup, a cup competition in Northern Irish football.

The tournament was won by Linfield for the 23rd time.

== Group standings ==
Pos	Team	Pld	W	D	L	GF	GA	GR	Pts	Result
1	Linfield (C)	11	9	1	1	19	8	2.375	19	Champions
2	Crusaders	11	8	1	2	21	10	2.100	17	
3	Glenavon	11	6	3	2	23	14	1.643	15	
4	Distillery	11	7	1	3	20	13	1.538	15	
5	Derry City	11	5	2	4	21	16	1.313	12	
6	Glentoran	11	5	2	4	25	20	1.250	12	
7	Ballymena United	11	3	5	3	16	13	1.231	11	
8	Portadown	11	3	2	6	13	19	0.684	8	
9	Ards	11	2	3	6	10	13	0.769	7	
10	Bangor	11	2	3	6	13	27	0.481	7	
11	Coleraine	11	1	4	6	15	18	0.833	6	
12	Cliftonville	11	1	1	9	11	36	0.306	3	

Source: Irish League Archive
(C) Champions
