= 1961–62 City Cup =

Tournament details
- Country: Northern Ireland
- Teams: 12

Final positions
- Champions: Linfield (21st win)
- Runners-up: Portadown

Tournament statistics
- Matches played: 68
- Goals scored: 276 (4.06 per match)

The 1961–62 City Cup was the 57th edition of the City Cup, a cup competition in Northern Irish football.

The tournament was won by Linfield for the 21st time.

== Group standings ==
Pos	Team	Pld	W	D	L	GF	GA	GR	Pts	Result
1	Linfield (C)	11	10	0	1	32	13	2.462	20	Champions
2	Portadown	11	8	2	1	24	13	1.846	18	
3	Crusaders	11	6	1	4	16	15	1.067	13	
4	Distillery	11	6	1	4	23	22	1.045	13	
5	Ards	11	5	1	5	31	20	1.550	11	
6	Coleraine	11	5	1	5	26	28	0.929	11	
7	Derry City	11	3	5	3	19	22	0.864	11	
8	Ballymena United	11	4	1	6	25	16	1.563	9	
9	Glenavon	11	4	1	6	21	22	0.955	9	
10	Glentoran	11	3	3	5	25	33	0.758	9	
11	Bangor	11	3	0	8	24	33	0.727	6	
12	Cliftonville	11	1	0	10	10	39	0.256	2	

Source: Irish League Archive
(C) Champions
