= 1927–28 City Cup =

Tournament details
- Country: Northern Ireland
- Teams: 14

Final positions
- Champions: Belfast Celtic (4th win)
- Runners-up: Linfield

Tournament statistics
- Matches played: 91
- Goals scored: 376 (4.13 per match)

The 1927–28 City Cup was the 30th edition of the City Cup, a cup competition in Northern Irish football.

The tournament was won by Belfast Celtic for the 4th time.

== Group standings ==
Pos	Team	Pld	W	D	L	GF	GA	GR	Pts	Result
1	Belfast Celtic (C)	13	10	2	1	33	16	2.063	22	Champions
2	Linfield	13	9	2	2	34	15	2.267	20	
3	Distillery	13	9	1	3	34	19	1.789	19	
4	Glenavon	13	7	3	3	25	18	1.389	17	
5	Larne	13	7	2	4	28	25	1.120	16	
6	Coleraine	13	7	1	5	28	28	1.000	15	
7	Portadown	13	6	2	5	39	30	1.300	14	
8	Newry Town	13	6	1	6	25	25	1.000	13	
9	Bangor	13	5	1	7	30	34	0.882	11	
10	Glentoran	13	4	1	8	24	28	0.857	9	
11	Queen's Island	13	3	2	8	26	33	0.788	8	
12	Cliftonville	13	3	2	8	14	28	0.500	8	
13	Ards	13	1	4	8	22	40	0.550	6	
14	Barn	13	0	4	9	15	38	0.395	4	

Source: Irish League Archive
(C) Champions
