= 1938–39 City Cup =

Tournament details
- Country: Northern Ireland
- Teams: 14

Final positions
- Champions: Portadown (1st win)
- Runners-up: Linfield

Tournament statistics
- Matches played: 91
- Goals scored: 390 (4.29 per match)

The 1938–39 City Cup was the 41st edition of the City Cup, a cup competition in Northern Irish football.

The tournament was won by Portadown for the 1st time.

== Group standings ==
| Pos | Team | Pld | W | D | L | GF | GA | GR | Pts | Result |
|---|---|---|---|---|---|---|---|---|---|---|
| 1 | Portadown (C) | 13 | 11 | 1 | 1 | 36 | 8 | 4.500 | 23 | Champions |
| 2 | Linfield | 13 | 11 | 0 | 2 | 45 | 23 | 1.957 | 22 | |
| 3 | Derry City | 13 | 9 | 1 | 3 | 47 | 22 | 2.136 | 19 | |
| 4 | Glentoran | 13 | 8 | 1 | 4 | 37 | 18 | 2.056 | 17 | |
| 5 | Belfast Celtic | 13 | 7 | 2 | 4 | 38 | 16 | 2.375 | 16 | |
| 6 | Ballymena United | 13 | 7 | 1 | 5 | 28 | 29 | 0.966 | 15 | |
| 7 | Distillery | 13 | 6 | 2 | 5 | 23 | 32 | 0.719 | 14 | |
| 8 | Glenavon | 13 | 5 | 3 | 5 | 30 | 26 | 1.154 | 13 | |
| 9 | Newry Town | 13 | 4 | 3 | 6 | 19 | 32 | 0.594 | 11 | |
| 10 | Bangor | 13 | 3 | 3 | 7 | 19 | 23 | 0.826 | 9 | |
| 11 | Larne | 13 | 3 | 3 | 7 | 19 | 30 | 0.633 | 9 | |
| 12 | Coleraine | 13 | 2 | 1 | 10 | 19 | 50 | 0.380 | 5 | |
| 13 | Ards | 13 | 2 | 1 | 10 | 14 | 42 | 0.333 | 5 | |
| 14 | Cliftonville | 13 | 2 | 0 | 11 | 16 | 39 | 0.410 | 4 | |

Source: Irish League Archive
(C) Champions
