= 1952–53 City Cup =

Tournament details
- Country: Northern Ireland
- Teams: 12

Final positions
- Champions: Glentoran (9th win)
- Runners-up: Linfield

Tournament statistics
- Matches played: 68
- Goals scored: 248 (3.65 per match)

The 1952–53 City Cup was the 48th edition of the City Cup, a cup competition in Northern Irish football.

The tournament was won by Glentoran for the 9th time.

== Group standings ==
Pos	Team	Pld	W	D	L	GF	GA	GR	Pts	Result
1	Glentoran (C)	11	9	1	1	48	11	4.364	19	Champions
2	Linfield	11	5	5	1	20	11	1.818	15	
3	Ballymena United	11	7	0	4	16	13	1.231	14	
4	Coleraine	11	5	4	2	23	27	0.852	14	
5	Glenavon	11	5	1	5	24	22	1.091	11	
6	Cliftonville	11	4	2	5	18	20	0.900	10	
7	Portadown	11	4	1	6	18	17	1.059	9	
8	Distillery	11	4	1	6	16	16	1.000	9	
9	Ards	11	3	3	5	20	26	0.769	9	
10	Crusaders	11	3	2	6	18	25	0.720	8	
11	Bangor	11	2	3	6	14	26	0.538	7	
12	Derry City	11	3	1	7	13	34	0.382	7	

Source: Irish League Archive
(C) Champions
