= 1896–97 City Cup =

Tournament details
- Country: Ireland
- Date: 5 December 1896 – 26 May 1897
- Teams: 6

Final positions
- Champions: Glentoran (1st win)
- Runners-up: Cliftonville

Tournament statistics
- Matches played: 31
- Goals scored: 114 (3.68 per match)

The 1896–97 City Cup was the third edition of the City Cup, a cup competition in Irish football.

The tournament was won by Glentoran for the first time.

== Group standings ==
Pos	Team	Pld	W	D	L	GF	GA	GR	Pts	Result
1	Glentoran (C)	10	7	2	1	24	9	2.667	16	Champions
2	Cliftonville	10	5	2	3	21	14	1.500	12	
3	North Staffordshire Regiment	10	5	2	3	17	17	1.000	12	
4	Distillery	10	3	4	3	21	22	0.955	10	
5	Linfield	10	2	3	5	19	24	0.792	7	
6	Celtic	10	1	1	8	9	25	0.360	3	

Source: Irish League Archive
(C) Champions

== Results ==
=== Group ===
Home \ Away	CEL	CLI	DIS	GLT	LIN	NSR
Celtic		1–2	0–3	1–0	1–4	1–2
Cliftonville	3–0		3–3	2–2	4–3	2–0
Distillery	4–2	0–4		2–2	3–3	0–1
Glentoran	3–1	2–0	3–0		2–0	3–0
Linfield	2–2	2–1	1–3	0–3		1–2
North Staffs	2–0	1–0	3–3	3–4	3–3	

Source: Irish League Archive
Legend: Blue = home team win; Yellow = draw; Red = away team win.

=== 2nd/3rd place play-off ===
- 26 May 1897, Cliftonville 2–1 North Staffordshire Regiment (Solitude, Belfast)
