= 1907–08 City Cup =

Tournament details
- Country: Ireland
- Date: 5 October 1907 – 29 August 1908
- Teams: 6

Final positions
- Champions: Linfield (2nd win)
- Runners-up: Glentoran

Tournament statistics
- Matches played: 30
- Goals scored: 85 (2.83 per match)

The 1907–08 City Cup was the 14th edition of the City Cup, a cup competition in Irish football.

The tournament was won by Linfield for the ninth time.

== Group standings ==
Pos	Team	Pld	W	D	L	GF	GA	GR	Pts	Result
1	Linfield (C)	10	5	3	2	11	12	0.917	13	Champions
2	Glentoran	10	6	0	4	20	11	1.818	12	
3	Cliftonville	10	4	3	3	16	11	1.455	11	
4	Distillery	10	3	2	5	13	15	0.867	8	
5	Shelbourne	10	4	0	6	12	17	0.706	8	
6	Belfast Celtic	10	3	2	5	13	19	0.684	8	

Source: Irish League Archive
(C) Champions

== Results ==
Home \ Away	CEL	CLI	DIS	GLT	LIN	SHL
Belfast Celtic		1–1	3–2	3–2	0–2	4–1
Cliftonville	5–1		2–0	2–1	0–0	2–0
Distillery	3–0	1–1		1–0	1–2	1–3
Glentoran	1–0	2–1	2–1		5–0	3–0
Linfield	1–1	2–1	1–1	2–1		1–0
Shelbourne	1–0	3–1	1–2	1–3	2–0	

Source: Irish League Archive
Legend: Blue = home team win; Yellow = draw; Red = away team win.
