= 1903–04 City Cup =

Tournament details
- Country: Ireland
- Date: 12 December 1903 – 7 May 1904
- Teams: 6

Final positions
- Champions: Linfield (8th win)
- Runners-up: Distillery

Tournament statistics
- Matches played: 28
- Goals scored: 101 (3.61 per match)

The 1903–04 City Cup was the tenth edition of the City Cup, a cup competition in Irish football.

The tournament was won by Linfield for the eighth time and fifth consecutive year.

== Group standings ==
Pos	Team	Pld	W	D	L	GF	GA	GR	Pts	Result
1	Linfield (C)	10	8	1	1	23	2	11.500	17	Champions
2	Distillery	10	7	2	1	21	5	4.200	16	
3	Belfast Celtic	10	5	2	3	19	18	1.056	12	
4	Glentoran	10	4	0	6	18	22	0.818	8	
5	Cliftonville	10	3	1	6	16	23	0.696	7	
6	King's Own Scottish Borderers	10	0	0	10	4	31	0.129	0	

Source: Irish League Archive
(C) Champions

== Results ==
Home \ Away	CEL	CLI	DIS	GLT	KOS	LIN
Belfast Celtic		4–3	0–1	2–1	– (Note: KOSB forfeited, win awarded to opponents.)	1–0
Cliftonville	1–1		1–3	0–3	2–1	0–3
Distillery	1–1	4–0		4–0	4–0	0–0
Glentoran	2–1	2–1	2–4		4–0	0–2
KOSB	1–9	0–3	–	2–4		0–1
Linfield	8–0	2–1	1–0	2–0	4–0	

Source: Irish League Archive
Legend: Blue = home team win; Yellow = draw; Red = away team win.
