= 1939–40 City Cup =

Tournament details
- Country: Northern Ireland
- Teams: 14

Final positions
- Champions: Belfast Celtic (8th win)
- Runners-up: Derry City

Tournament statistics
- Matches played: 92
- Goals scored: 353 (3.84 per match)

The 1939–40 City Cup was the 42nd edition of the City Cup, a cup competition in Northern Irish football.

The tournament was won by Belfast Celtic for the 8th time. They defeated Derry City 7–1 in a test match at Solitude after both teams finished level on points in the group standings.

== Group standings ==
Pos	Team	Pld	W	D	L	GF	GA	GR	Pts	Result
1	Belfast Celtic	13	10	2	1	42	14	3.000	22	Advance to test match
2	Derry City	13	10	2	1	33	12	2.750	22	Advance to test match
3	Linfield	13	6	5	2	31	17	1.824	17	
4	Newry Town	13	6	2	5	22	25	0.880	14	
5	Glentoran	13	4	5	4	33	22	1.500	13	
6	Portadown	13	5	3	5	18	18	1.000	13	
7	Distillery	13	4	5	4	24	26	0.923	13	
8	Bangor	13	5	3	5	20	26	0.769	13	
9	Glenavon	13	4	4	5	27	29	0.931	12	
10	Coleraine	13	4	4	5	19	25	0.760	12	
11	Ballymena United	13	4	2	7	23	29	0.793	10	
12	Ards	13	4	1	8	23	31	0.742	9	
13	Larne	13	1	6	6	17	31	0.548	8	
14	Cliftonville	13	1	2	10	13	40	0.325	4	

Source: Irish League Archive

=== Test match ===
1 January 1940

Belfast Celtic	7–1	Derry City

Solitude, Belfast
