= 1973–74 City Cup =

Tournament details
- Country: Northern Ireland
- Teams: 12

Final positions
- Champions: Linfield (24th win)
- Runners-up: Coleraine

Tournament statistics
- Matches played: 31
- Goals scored: 144 (4.65 per match)

The 1973–74 City Cup was the 69th edition of the City Cup, a cup competition in Northern Irish football.

The tournament was won by Linfield for the 24th time after they defeated Coleraine 3–1 in a penalty shootout (after a 2–2 draw after extra time) in the final at the Ballymena Showgrounds.

== Group standings ==
=== Section A ===
Pos	Team	Pld	W	D	L	GF	GA	GR	Pts	Result
1	Linfield	5	4	0	1	14	6	2.333	8	Advance to final
2	Portadown	5	4	0	1	17	10	1.700	8	
3	Bangor	5	2	1	2	10	7	1.429	5	
4	Glenavon	5	2	1	2	7	14	0.500	5	
5	Ards	5	1	2	2	15	16	0.938	4	
6	Distillery	5	0	0	5	8	18	0.444	0	

Source: Irish League Archive

=== Section B ===
Pos	Team	Pld	W	D	L	GF	GA	GR	Pts	Result
1	Coleraine	5	4	1	0	17	8	2.125	9	Advance to final
2	Ballymena United	5	3	1	1	16	8	2.000	7	
3	Crusaders	5	2	1	2	12	9	1.333	5	
4	Glentoran	5	1	3	1	9	9	1.000	5	
5	Larne	5	0	2	3	8	13	0.615	2	
6	Cliftonville	5	1	0	4	7	22	0.318	2	

Source: Irish League Archive

== Final ==
1 January 1974

Linfield	2 – 2 (a.e.t.)	Coleraine
McVeigh 65'; Magee 85'	Report	Mullan 44'; Reid 75'
Penalties
Magee (penalty missed); Patterson (penalty scored); McVeigh (penalty scored); Fraser (penalty scored); McShane (penalty scored)	3 – 1	(penalty scored) Murray; (penalty missed) Mullan; (penalty missed) Cochrane; (penalty missed) Dickson

The Showgrounds, Ballymena
Referee: V. Maxwell (Belfast)
