= 1955–56 City Cup =

Tournament details
- Country: Northern Ireland
- Teams: 12

Final positions
- Champions: Glenavon (3rd win)
- Runners-up: Coleraine

Tournament statistics
- Matches played: 69
- Goals scored: 268 (3.88 per match)

The 1955–56 City Cup was the 51st edition of the City Cup, a cup competition in Northern Irish football.

The tournament was won by Glenavon for the 3rd time and 2nd consecutive season. They defeated Coleraine 4–0 in a test match at Grosvenor Park after both teams finished level on points in the group standings.

== Group standings ==
Pos	Team	Pld	W	D	L	GF	GA	GR	Pts	Result
1	Glenavon	11	7	4	0	34	17	2.000	18	Advance to test match
2	Coleraine	11	7	4	0	26	18	1.444	18	Advance to test match
3	Linfield	11	6	4	1	31	16	1.938	16	
4	Glentoran	11	5	4	2	21	8	2.625	14	
5	Cliftonville	11	4	4	3	23	17	1.353	12	
6	Distillery	11	5	1	5	23	24	0.958	11	
7	Bangor	11	4	2	5	18	19	0.947	10	
8	Ards	11	5	0	6	21	26	0.808	10	
9	Ballymena United	11	3	2	6	21	29	0.724	8	
10	Crusaders	11	3	2	6	16	27	0.593	8	
11	Portadown	11	2	1	8	14	30	0.467	5	
12	Derry City	11	0	2	9	16	33	0.485	2	

Source: Irish League Archive

=== Test match ===
18 January 1956

Glenavon	4–0	Coleraine

Grosvenor Park, Belfast
