= Vienna Cup =

The Vienna Cup refers to one of two competitions:

- Vienna Cup (football)
- A figure skating competition also known as the Karl Schäfer Memorial.
