= 1965–66 City Cup =

Tournament details
- Country: Northern Ireland
- Teams: 12

Final positions
- Champions: Glenavon (5th win)
- Runners-up: Crusaders

Tournament statistics
- Matches played: 68
- Goals scored: 280 (4.12 per match)

The 1965–66 City Cup was the 61st edition of the City Cup, a cup competition in Northern Irish football.

The tournament was won by Glenavon for the 5th time.

== Group standings ==
Pos	Team	Pld	W	D	L	GF	GA	GR	Pts	Result
1	Glenavon (C)	11	10	0	1	34	13	2.615	20	Champions
2	Crusaders	11	8	0	3	35	17	2.059	16	
3	Coleraine	11	6	3	2	33	19	1.737	15	
4	Glentoran	11	5	4	2	23	18	1.278	14	
5	Linfield	11	6	1	4	27	13	2.077	13	
6	Ards	11	5	3	3	19	15	1.267	13	
7	Portadown	11	5	1	5	27	24	1.125	11	
8	Ballymena United	11	4	3	4	22	23	0.957	11	
9	Distillery	11	4	1	6	16	29	0.552	9	
10	Derry City	11	2	1	8	17	29	0.586	5	
11	Cliftonville	11	2	0	9	20	37	0.541	4	
12	Bangor	11	0	1	10	7	43	0.163	1	

Source: Irish League Archive
(C) Champions
