= 1928–29 City Cup =

Tournament details
- Country: Northern Ireland
- Teams: 14

Final positions
- Champions: Linfield (14th win)
- Runners-up: Ballymena

Tournament statistics
- Matches played: 91
- Goals scored: 436 (4.79 per match)

The 1928–29 City Cup was the 31st edition of the City Cup, a cup competition in Northern Irish football.

The tournament was won by Linfield for the 14th time.

== Group standings ==
Pos	Team	Pld	W	D	L	GF	GA	GR	Pts	Result
1	Linfield (C)	13	11	1	1	44	16	2.750	23	Champions
2	Ballymena	13	10	1	2	48	19	2.526	21	
3	Glentoran	13	8	0	5	38	28	1.357	16	
4	Belfast Celtic	13	6	3	4	31	21	1.476	15	
5	Glenavon	13	6	3	4	32	29	1.103	15	
6	Ards	13	6	1	6	36	30	1.200	13	
7	Portadown	13	5	3	5	28	28	1.000	13	
8	Larne	13	5	2	6	28	33	0.848	12	
9	Distillery	13	5	2	6	32	41	0.780	12	
10	Newry Town	13	5	1	7	26	35	0.743	11	
11	Coleraine	13	4	2	7	27	28	0.964	10	
12	Cliftonville	13	4	2	7	23	35	0.657	10	
13	Queen's Island	13	2	2	9	28	44	0.636	6	
14	Bangor	13	2	1	10	15	49	0.306	5	

Source: Irish League Archive
(C) Champions
