= 1932–33 City Cup =

Tournament details
- Country: Northern Ireland
- Teams: 14

Final positions
- Champions: Belfast Celtic (7th win)
- Runners-up: Linfield

Tournament statistics
- Matches played: 92
- Goals scored: 356 (3.87 per match)

The 1932–33 City Cup was the 35th edition of the City Cup, a cup competition in Northern Irish football.

The tournament was won by Belfast Celtic for the 7th time. They defeated Linfield 2–1 in a test match at Grosvenor Park after both teams had finished level in the group standings.

== Group standings ==
Pos	Team	Pld	W	D	L	GF	GA	GR	Pts	Result
1	Belfast Celtic	13	10	0	3	40	18	2.222	20	Advance to test match
2	Linfield	13	9	2	2	35	18	1.944	20	Advance to test match
3	Glentoran	13	7	5	1	41	20	2.050	19	
4	Distillery	13	6	4	3	23	19	1.211	16	
5	Derry City	13	6	3	4	32	22	1.455	15	
6	Bangor	13	6	3	4	24	26	0.923	15	
7	Larne	13	6	3	4	33	37	0.892	15	
8	Coleraine	13	5	2	6	23	21	1.095	12	
9	Ards	13	3	5	5	14	21	0.667	11	
10	Glenavon	13	4	2	7	25	26	0.962	10	
11	Ballymena	13	4	2	7	21	25	0.840	10	
12	Cliftonville	13	4	1	8	21	35	0.600	9	
13	Portadown	13	1	4	8	11	27	0.407	6	
14	Newry Town	13	1	2	10	10	38	0.263	4	

Source: Irish League Archive

=== Test match ===
11 May 1933

Belfast Celtic	2–1	Linfield

Grosvenor Park, Belfast
