= Johnny Darling =

Irish association football player

Personal information
- Full name: John Darling
- Date of birth: 30 October 1877
- Place of birth: Belfast, Ireland
- Date of death: 8 February 1946 (aged 68)
- Place of death: Belfast, Northern Ireland
- Positions: Half-back; forward

Senior career*
Years	Team	Apps	(Gls)
- Glentoran
1894–1915	Linfield	497	(109)

International career
1897–1912	Ireland	22	(1)
1897–1911	Irish League	16	(2)
- * Club domestic league appearances and goals

Johnny Darling (30 October 1877 – 8 February 1946) was an Irish footballer who played as a half back and forward.

== Club career ==
Born in the Ballymacarret area of Belfast, Darling played youth football for Glentoran before signing for Linfield F.C. in 1894. He would make his debut during the 1896-97 season at the age of 19 and would go on to make 497 appearances for the club, winning the Irish League on eight occasions between 1897 and 1914. Darling would also win six Irish Cups whilst with Linfield, scoring twice in the 1904 Cup Final against Derry Celtic and four goals in the City Cup final the same season against Belfast Celtic.

Darling's playing career would conclude with a testimonial match which earned him close to £300.

== Later life ==
After retiring from football, Johnny Darling would serve as Club President of Ormiston and Vice President of Dundela. Outside of the game, Darling was a member of the Star of the East Masonic Lodge and Vice-President of the East Belfast Working Mens Temperance Club. He would later own a newsagents on the Newtownards Road.

Darling died on 8 February 1946, and is buried in the Dundonald Cemetery in Belfast.

== International career ==
Darling made his Ireland debut in a 6-0 defeat to England at the age of 19 during the 1896-97 British Home Championship. He would make 22 international appearances in total, scoring once, from the penalty spot, against Wales in 1910, his penultimate international appearance. Darling would captain his country in his final appearance, a 4-1 defeat against Scotland.

He would also make 16 appearances for the Irish League representative side, scoring 2 goals.
