= 1953–54 City Cup =

Tournament details
- Country: Northern Ireland
- Teams: 12

Final positions
- Champions: Coleraine (1st win)
- Runners-up: Glentoran

Tournament statistics
- Matches played: 68
- Goals scored: 249 (3.66 per match)

The 1953–54 City Cup was the 49th edition of the City Cup, a cup competition in Northern Irish football.

The tournament was won by Coleraine for the 1st time.

== Group standings ==
Pos	Team	Pld	W	D	L	GF	GA	GR	Pts	Result
1	Coleraine (C)	11	7	3	1	31	16	1.938	17	Champions
2	Glentoran	11	6	4	1	33	9	3.667	16	
3	Glenavon	11	6	3	2	28	11	2.545	15	
4	Linfield	11	6	3	2	29	16	1.813	15	
5	Distillery	11	4	3	4	16	12	1.333	11	
6	Crusaders	11	4	3	4	15	18	0.833	11	
7	Ards	11	3	5	3	18	25	0.720	11	
8	Derry City	11	4	1	6	15	27	0.556	9	
9	Portadown	11	3	2	6	17	26	0.654	8	
10	Ballymena United	11	3	2	6	13	23	0.565	8	
11	Bangor	11	2	2	7	18	33	0.545	6	
12	Cliftonville	11	1	3	7	16	33	0.485	5	

Source: Irish League Archive
(C) Champions
