= 1936–37 City Cup =

Tournament details
- Country: Northern Ireland
- Teams: 14

Final positions
- Champions: Derry City (2nd win)
- Runners-up: Linfield

Tournament statistics
- Matches played: 91
- Goals scored: 367 (4.03 per match)

The 1936–37 City Cup was the 39th edition of the City Cup, a cup competition in Northern Irish football.

The tournament was won by Derry City for the 2nd time.

== Group standings ==
| Pos | Team | Pld | W | D | L | GF | GA | GR | Pts | Result |
|---|---|---|---|---|---|---|---|---|---|---|
| 1 | Derry City (C) | 13 | 10 | 2 | 1 | 38 | 12 | 3.167 | 22 | Champions |
| 2 | Linfield | 13 | 9 | 1 | 3 | 34 | 13 | 2.615 | 19 | |
| 3 | Belfast Celtic | 13 | 8 | 2 | 3 | 35 | 12 | 2.917 | 18 | |
| 4 | Newry Town | 13 | 9 | 0 | 4 | 36 | 23 | 1.565 | 18 | |
| 5 | Portadown | 13 | 8 | 1 | 4 | 31 | 19 | 1.632 | 17 | |
| 6 | Coleraine | 13 | 6 | 3 | 4 | 22 | 22 | 1.000 | 15 | |
| 7 | Bangor | 13 | 6 | 0 | 7 | 21 | 32 | 0.656 | 12 | |
| 8 | Ballymena United | 13 | 4 | 3 | 6 | 16 | 26 | 0.615 | 11 | |
| 9 | Ards | 13 | 5 | 1 | 7 | 26 | 47 | 0.553 | 11 | |
| 10 | Glentoran | 13 | 4 | 2 | 7 | 35 | 37 | 0.946 | 10 | |
| 11 | Distillery | 13 | 5 | 0 | 8 | 22 | 30 | 0.733 | 10 | |
| 12 | Larne | 13 | 3 | 4 | 6 | 24 | 33 | 0.727 | 10 | |
| 13 | Glenavon | 13 | 3 | 1 | 9 | 22 | 31 | 0.710 | 7 | |
| 14 | Cliftonville | 13 | 1 | 0 | 12 | 18 | 43 | 0.419 | 2 | |

Source: Irish League Archive
(C) Champions
