= 1970–71 City Cup =

Tournament details
- Country: Northern Ireland
- Teams: 12

Final positions
- Champions: Bangor (1st win)
- Runners-up: Distillery

Tournament statistics
- Matches played: 67
- Goals scored: 253 (3.78 per match)

The 1970–71 City Cup was the 66th edition of the City Cup, a cup competition in Northern Irish football.

The tournament was won by Bangor for the 1st time.

After experimenting with a different format the previous season the tournament reverted to its traditional league format with all 12 clubs involved, however this would be the last time the tournament was structured this way. Linfield's home match against Derry City did not take place after Derry refused to travel to Windsor Park; Linfield were subsequently awarded the points.

== Group standings ==
Pos	Team	Pld	W	D	L	GF	GA	GR	Pts	Result
1	Bangor (C)	11	7	4	0	31	14	2.214	18	Champions
2	Distillery	11	8	1	2	22	15	1.467	17	
3	Glentoran	11	7	2	2	20	14	1.429	16	
4	Linfield	11	7	1	3	25	16	1.563	15	
5	Glenavon	11	6	1	4	26	20	1.300	13	
6	Derry City	11	6	0	5	21	18	1.167	12	
7	Coleraine	11	5	1	5	21	20	1.050	11	
8	Ards	11	3	4	4	22	20	1.100	10	
9	Ballymena United	11	4	1	6	14	19	0.737	9	
10	Portadown	11	2	0	9	16	26	0.615	4	
11	Crusaders	11	1	2	8	20	34	0.588	4	
12	Cliftonville	11	1	1	9	15	37	0.405	3	

Source: Irish League Archive
(C) Champions
