= 1934–35 City Cup =

Tournament details
- Country: Northern Ireland
- Teams: 14

Final positions
- Champions: Derry City (1st win)
- Runners-up: Linfield

Tournament statistics
- Matches played: 92
- Goals scored: 371 (4.03 per match)

The 1934–35 City Cup was the 37th edition of the City Cup, a cup competition in Northern Irish football.

The tournament was won by Derry City for the 1st time.

== Group standings ==
| Pos | Team | Pld | W | D | L | GF | GA | GR | Pts | Result |
|---|---|---|---|---|---|---|---|---|---|---|
| 1 | Derry City (C) | 13 | 10 | 2 | 1 | 46 | 16 | 2.875 | 22 | Champions |
| 2 | Linfield | 13 | 8 | 3 | 2 | 26 | 13 | 2.000 | 19 | |
| 3 | Belfast Celtic | 13 | 8 | 3 | 2 | 38 | 10 | 3.800 | 19 | |
| 4 | Glentoran | 13 | 8 | 2 | 3 | 35 | 23 | 1.522 | 18 | |
| 5 | Portadown | 13 | 6 | 3 | 4 | 23 | 22 | 1.045 | 15 | |
| 6 | Newry Town | 13 | 5 | 4 | 4 | 29 | 32 | 0.906 | 14 | |
| 7 | Glenavon | 13 | 4 | 5 | 4 | 28 | 25 | 1.120 | 13 | |
| 8 | Distillery | 13 | 5 | 2 | 6 | 25 | 30 | 0.833 | 12 | |
| 9 | Ballymena United | 13 | 5 | 2 | 6 | 20 | 28 | 0.714 | 12 | |
| 10 | Larne | 13 | 5 | 1 | 7 | 18 | 32 | 0.563 | 11 | |
| 11 | Coleraine | 13 | 4 | 2 | 7 | 25 | 31 | 0.806 | 10 | |
| 12 | Ards | 13 | 2 | 3 | 8 | 22 | 36 | 0.611 | 7 | |
| 13 | Cliftonville | 13 | 2 | 2 | 9 | 22 | 32 | 0.688 | 6 | |
| 14 | Bangor | 13 | 1 | 2 | 10 | 13 | 40 | 0.325 | 4 | |

Source: Irish League Archive
(C) Champions
