= 1969–70 City Cup =

Tournament details
- Country: Northern Ireland
- Teams: 12

Final positions
- Champions: Glentoran (13th win)
- Runners-up: Bangor

Tournament statistics
- Matches played: 31
- Goals scored: 123 (3.97 per match)

The 1969–70 City Cup was the 65th edition of the City Cup, a cup competition in Northern Irish football.

The tournament was won by Glentoran for the 13th time after they defeated Bangor 7–1 in the final at Windsor Park.

For the first time in its history, the City Cup was not run as a league table with all clubs playing each other once - the 12 clubs were split into two sections with the two section winners playing each other in the final.

== Group standings ==
=== Section A ===
Pos	Team	Pld	W	D	L	GF	GA	GR	Pts	Result
1	Bangor	5	4	1	0	12	7	1.714	9	Advance to final
2	Linfield	5	3	0	2	14	7	2.000	6	
3	Ards	5	2	2	1	11	8	1.375	6	
4	Distillery	5	2	0	3	7	6	1.167	4	
5	Portadown	5	1	1	3	5	11	0.455	3	
6	Glenavon	5	1	0	4	5	15	0.333	2	

Source: Irish League Archive

=== Section B ===
Pos	Team	Pld	W	D	L	GF	GA	GR	Pts	Result
1	Glentoran	5	4	1	0	16	5	3.200	9	Advance to final
2	Coleraine	5	3	1	1	12	6	2.000	7	
3	Crusaders	5	3	1	1	15	8	1.875	7	
4	Derry City	5	2	0	3	8	10	0.800	4	
5	Ballymena United	5	1	1	3	4	9	0.444	3	
6	Cliftonville	5	0	0	5	6	23	0.261	0	

Source: Irish League Archive

== Final ==
28 October 1969

Glentoran	7–1	Bangor
Patterson; Cassidy	Report	Craig

Windsor Park, Belfast
