= City Cup (Northern Ireland) =

- Organiser(s): Irish Football Association
- Founded: 1894
- Abolished: 1976
- Region: Northern Ireland (1921–1976); Ireland (1895–1921)
- Most championships: Linfield (24 titles)

The City Cup was a football cup competition which involved teams from Northern Ireland (and prior to 1921, teams from Ireland). The tournament ran from 1894 and ceased to exist in 1976. The physical trophy the teams played for was called the Dunville Cup and this trophy is now presented to the winners of the Northern Ireland Football League Cup, which began in 1987.

== History ==
A cup tournament consisting solely of Belfast clubs had been mooted as early as 1892, although it was not until two years later that the competition was organised. While the City Cup began as a competition for Belfast clubs only, from 1905 to 1911 Dublin-based club Shelbourne also participated. In the 1911–12 season, all eight Irish League clubs participated (Derry Celtic and Glenavon joining the five Belfast teams and Shelbourne). In the 1912–13 season, when the League expanded to ten clubs, only seven participated (the five Belfast teams plus Glenavon and Shelbourne. From 1913 until its demise in 1976, all clubs who were members of the Irish League competed for the City Cup (excluding the war years).

During 1915 to 1919, the City Cup was known as the Belfast City Cup and reverted to being a Belfast-only competition and is not recognised as an "official" competition for this period but as a wartime competition; during 1940 to 1947, it was not played at all.

== Format ==
The format for the City Cup varied throughout its history, but most commonly it was organised on a league basis, by which each participating club played each other and the team with the most points won the cup.

The format over the years was as follows:

| Years | No. of seasons | Format |
|---|---|---|
| 1894–1915, 1919–40, 1947–69 | 64 | league |
| 1969–70 | 1 | group system plus final |
| 1970–71 | 1 | league |
| 1971–76 | 5 | group system plus final |

== List of winners and runner-ups ==
=== League format ===
| Season | Winner | Runner-up |
|---|---|---|
| 1894–95 | Linfield (1) | Cliftonville |
| 1895–96 | Linfield (2) | Distillery |
| 1896–97 | Glentoran (1) | Cliftonville |
| 1897–98 | Linfield (3) | Belfast Celtic |
| 1898–99 | Glentoran (2) | Linfield |
| 1899–1900 | Linfield (4) | Distillery |
| 1900–01 | Linfield (5) | Cliftonville |
| 1901–02 | Linfield (6) | Glentoran |
| 1902–03 | Linfield (7) | Belfast Celtic |
| 1903–04 | Linfield (8) | Distillery |
| 1904–05 | Distillery (1) | Glentoran |
| 1905–06 | Belfast Celtic (1) | Cliftonville |
| 1906–07 | Belfast Celtic (2) | Cliftonville |
| 1907–08 | Linfield (9) | Glentoran |
| 1908–09 | Shelbourne (1) | Glentoran |
| 1909–10 | Linfield (10) | Distillery |
| 1910–11 | Glentoran (3) | Belfast Celtic |
| 1911–12 | Glentoran (4) | Distillery |
| 1912–13 | Distillery (2) | Glenavon |
| 1913–14 | Glentoran (5) | Linfield |
| 1914–15 | Glentoran (6) | Linfield |
| 1919–20 | Linfield (11) | Belfast Celtic |
| 1920–21 | Glenavon (1) | Glentoran |
| 1921–22 | Linfield (12) | Glentoran |
| 1922–23 | Queen’s Island (1) | Distillery |
| 1923–24 | Queen’s Island (2) | Glentoran |
| 1924–25 | Queen’s Island (3) | Glentoran |
| 1925–26 | Belfast Celtic (3) | Queen’s Island |
| 1926–27 | Linfield (13) | Belfast Celtic |
| 1927–28 | Belfast Celtic (4) | Linfield |
| 1928–29 | Linfield (14) | Ballymena |
| 1929–30 | Belfast Celtic (5) | Glentoran |
| 1930–31 | Belfast Celtic (6) | Linfield |
| 1931–32 | Glentoran (7) | Belfast Celtic |
| 1932–33 | Belfast Celtic (7) | Linfield |
| 1933–34 | Distillery (3) | Belfast Celtic |
| 1934–35 | Derry City (1) | Linfield |
| 1935–36 | Linfield (15) | Portadown |
| 1936–37 | Derry City (2) | Linfield |
| 1937–38 | Linfield (16) | Derry City |
| 1938–39 | Portadown (1) | Linfield |
| 1939–40 | Belfast Celtic (8) | Derry City |
| 1947–48 | Belfast Celtic (9) | Glentoran |
| 1948–49 | Belfast Celtic (10) | Linfield |
| 1949–50 | Linfield (17) | Derry City |
| 1950–51 | Glentoran (8) | Linfield |
| 1951–52 | Linfield (18) | Glentoran |
| 1952–53 | Glentoran (9) | Linfield |
| 1953–54 | Coleraine (1) | Glentoran |
| 1954–55 | Glenavon (2) | Distillery |
| 1955–56 | Glenavon (3) | Coleraine |
| 1956–57 | Glentoran (10) | Distillery |
| 1957–58 | Linfield (19) | Glentoran |
| 1958–59 | Linfield (20) | Glenavon |
| 1959–60 | Distillery (4) | Glenavon |
| 1960–61 | Glenavon (4) | Ballymena United |
| 1961–62 | Linfield (21) | Portadown |
| 1962–63 | Distillery (5) | Linfield |
| 1963–64 | Linfield (22) | Glentoran |
| 1964–65 | Glentoran (11) | Derry City |
| 1965–66 | Glenavon (5) | Crusaders |
| 1966–67 | Glentoran (12) | Linfield |
| 1967–68 | Linfield (23) | Crusaders |
| 1968–69 | Coleraine (2) | Derry City |
| 1970–71 | Bangor (1) | Distillery |

=== Finals ===
Key:

| pens. | Scores level after extra time. A penalty shootout was required to determine the winner. |

| Season | Winner | Score | Runner-up | Venue | Attendance |
|---|---|---|---|---|---|
| 1969–70 | Glentoran (13) | 2–1 | Bangor | Windsor Park, Belfast |
| 1971–72 | Ballymena United (1) | 1–0 | Ards | The Oval, Belfast |
| 1972–73 | Glentoran (14) | 2–0 | Coleraine | Ballymena Showgrounds, Ballymena |
| 1973–74 | Linfield (24) | 2 – 2 (a.e.t.) (3 – 1 pens.) | Coleraine | Ballymena Showgrounds, Ballymena |
| 1974–75 | Glentoran (15) | 3–1 | Linfield | Windsor Park, Belfast |
| 1975–76 | Bangor (2) | 0 – 0 (a.e.t.) (3 – 1 pens.) | Coleraine | Seaview, Belfast |

== Performance by club ==
| Club | Winners | Runners-up | Winning years | Runners-up years |
|---|---|---|---|---|
| Linfield | 24 | 15 | 1894–95, 1895–96, 1897–98, 1899–1900, 1900–01, 1901–02, 1902–03, 1903–04, 1907–08, 1909–10, 1919–20, 1921–22, 1926–27, 1928–29, 1935–36, 1937–38, 1949–50, 1951–52, 1957–58, 1958–59, 1961–62, 1963–64, 1967–68, 1973–74 | 1898–99, 1913–14, 1914–15, 1927–28, 1930–31, 1932–33, 1934–35, 1936–37, 1938–39, 1948–49, 1950–51, 1952–53, 1962–63, 1966–67, 1974–75 |
| Glentoran | 15 | 14 | 1896–97, 1898–99, 1910–11, 1911–12, 1913–14, 1914–15, 1931–32, 1950–51, 1952–53, 1956–57, 1964–65, 1966–67, 1969–70, 1972–73, 1974–75 | 1901–02, 1904–05, 1907–08, 1908–09, 1920–21, 1921–22, 1923–24, 1924–25, 1929–30, 1947–48, 1951–52, 1953–54, 1957–58, 1963–64 |
| Belfast Celtic | 10 | 7 | 1905–06, 1906–07, 1925–26, 1927–28, 1929–30, 1930–31, 1932–33, 1939–40, 1947–48, 1948–49 | 1897–98, 1902–03, 1910–11, 1919–20, 1926–27, 1931–32, 1933–34 |
| Distillery | 5 | 9 | 1904–05, 1912–13, 1933–34, 1959–60, 1962–63 | 1895–96, 1899–00, 1903–04, 1909–10, 1911–12, 1922–23, 1954–55, 1956–57, 1970–71 |
| Glenavon | 5 | 3 | 1920–21, 1954–55, 1955–56, 1960–61, 1965–66 | 1912–13, 1958–59, 1959–60 |
| Queen’s Island | 3 | 1 | 1922–23, 1923–24, 1924–25 | 1925–26 |
| Derry City | 2 | 5 | 1934–35, 1936–37 | 1937–38, 1939–40, 1949–50, 1964–65, 1968–69 |
| Coleraine | 2 | 4 | 1953–54, 1968–69 | 1955–56, 1972–73, 1973–74, 1975–76 |
| Bangor | 2 | 1 | 1970–71, 1975–76 | 1969–70 |
| Portadown | 1 | 2 | 1938–39 | 1935–36, 1961–62 |
| Ballymena United | 1 | 1 | 1971–72 | 1960–61 |
| Shelbourne | 1 | 0 | 1908–09 | — |
| Cliftonville | 0 | 5 | — | 1894–95, 1896–97, 1900–01, 1905–06, 1906–07 |
| Crusaders | 0 | 2 | — | 1965–66, 1967–68 |
| Ballymena | 0 | 1 | — | 1928–29 |
| Ards | 0 | 1 | — | 1971–72 |

== Belfast City Cup ==
Due to World War I, from the 1915–16 to 1918–19 seasons the City Cup was competed for by Ulster-based clubs only and was known as the "Belfast City Cup".

Key:

| & | Title was shared after test match finished in a draw |

| Season | Winner (number of titles) | Score | Runner-up |
|---|---|---|---|
| 1915–16 | Glentoran (1) | League format | Belfast United |
| 1916–17 | Glentoran (2) | League format | Linfield |
| 1917–18 | Linfield (1) | League format | Glentoran |
| 1918–19 | Belfast Celtic (1); Glentoran (3) | League format | — |

=== Performance by club ===
| Club | Winners | Runners-up | Winning years | Runners-up years |
|---|---|---|---|---|
| Glentoran | 3 (1 shared) | 1 | 1915–16, 1916–17, 1918–19 (shared) | 1917–18 |
| Linfield | 1 | 1 | 1917–18 | 1916–17 |
| Belfast Celtic | 1 (shared) | 0 | 1918–19 (shared) | — |
| Belfast United | 0 | 1 | — | 1915–16 |
