= Dungannon =

Town in County Tyrone, Northern Ireland

Coordinates: 54.50°N 6.77°W

Dungannon: Irish: Dún Geanainn
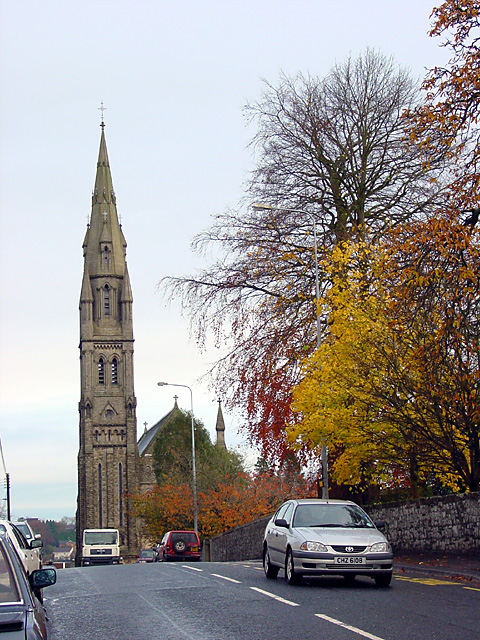
- St Patrick's Roman Catholic church

- Coat of Arms

- Location within Northern Ireland
- Population: 16,282 (2021 Census)
- Irish grid reference: H7962
  - Belfast: 40 miles (64 km)
- District: Mid-Ulster
- County: County Tyrone
- Country: Northern Ireland
- Sovereign state: United Kingdom
- Post town: DUNGANNON
- Postcode district: BT70, BT71
- Dialling code: 028
- Police: Northern Ireland
- Fire: Northern Ireland
- Ambulance: Northern Ireland
- UK Parliament: Fermanagh and South Tyrone
- NI Assembly: Fermanagh and South Tyrone

Dungannon (from Irish Dún Geanainn, meaning 'Geanann's fort', pronounced [d̪ˠuːn̪ˠ ˈɟan̪ˠən̪ˠ]) is a town in County Tyrone, Northern Ireland. It is the second-largest town in the historic county (after Omagh) and had a population of 16,282 at the 2021 census. Since 2015, the town shares local government with Magherafelt and Cookstown in the Mid-Ulster District Council.

For centuries, Dungannon was the chief seat of the O'Neill dynasty of Tír Eoghain, who dominated most of Ulster and built a castle on the hill. After the O'Neills' defeat in the Nine Years' War, the English founded a plantation town on the site. A linen centre in the 19th century, it attracted an extensive food processing industry in the late 20th. Moy Park, a leading poultry producer, is today the town's largest employer. As a result of Moy Park and other processors sourcing immigrant labour, Dungannon currently has the highest percentage of residents born outside of the British Isles of any town in Northern Ireland.

== History ==
=== 17th Century ===
==== The O'Neills ====
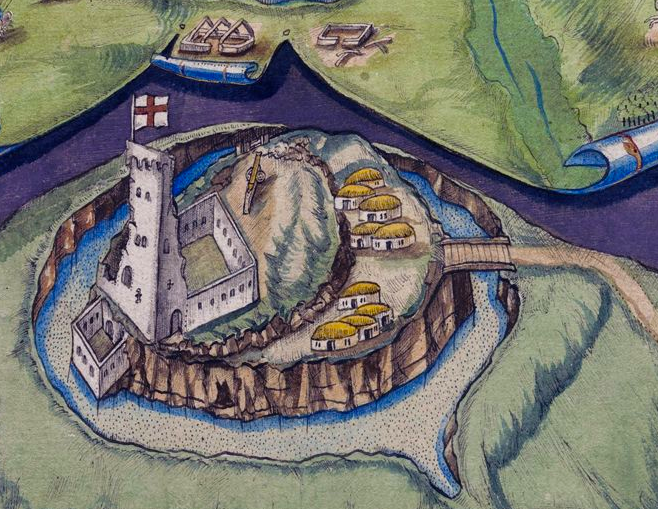
Part of a 1602 map by Richard Bartlett showing Dungannon Castle after its capture by the English

For centuries, Dungannon's fortunes were closely tied to that of the O'Neill dynasty which ruled a large part of Ulster until the 17th century. The traditional site of inauguration for The O'Neill's was Tullyhogue Fort, an Iron Age mound some four miles northeast of Dungannon. The clan O'Hagan were the stewards of this site for the O'Neills. In the 14th century the O'Neills built a castle on what is today known as Castle Hill (from which, on clear day, seven of the nine counties of Ulster are visible).

This castle was burned in 1602 by Hugh O'Neill, 2nd Earl of Tyrone, as Crown forces under Lord Mountjoy closed in on the Gaelic lords towards the end of the Nine Years' War. In 1607, ninety-nine Irish chieftains and their followers, including Hugh O'Neill, set sail from Rathmullan, bound for the continent, in an event known as the Flight of the Earls. In what became known as the Plantation of Ulster, their lands were confiscated and awarded to Protestant English and Scots settlers. Dungannon and its castle were granted to Sir Arthur Chichester, the Lord Deputy of Ireland.

==== Plantation town ====
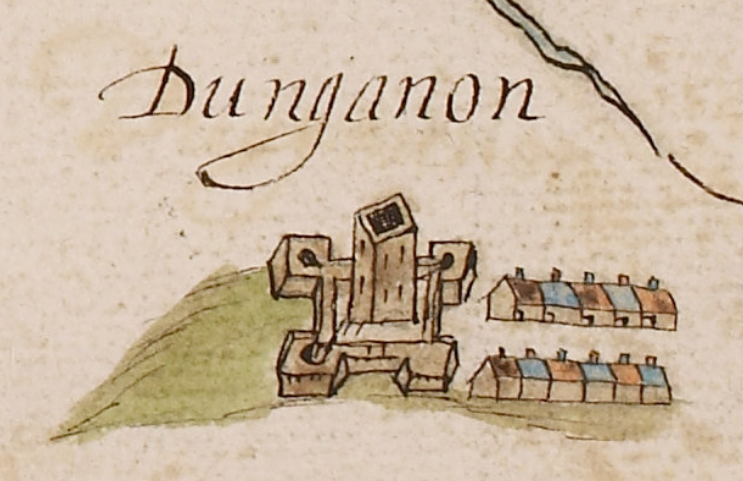
Dungannon shown on a 1624 map by Nicolas Pynnar

As part of the Plantation, in 1608 James I chartered a number of '"free schools" for the sons of local merchants and farmers. This included the Royal School Dungannon, established in the town in 1636, and from 1789 occupying its present site, south-east of Castle Hill, with the erection of a building known locally as the "Old Grey Mother" by the Archbishop of Armagh, Richard Robinson.

Sir Phelim O'Neill seized the town in the opening stages of the Irish Rebellion of 1641, and issued the Proclamation of Dungannon, in which the rebels set out their aims and proclaimed their loyalty to Charles I. O'Neill claimed they had been ordered to rise by the King, and later produced a forged commission in support of this.

During the course of the Irish Confederate Wars, Dungannon changed hands several times; Scots Covenanter forces under Alexander Leslie captured it in September 1642, before O'Neill took it back in spring 1643.

In 1689, during the Williamite War, Castle Hill, with still extant fortifications, was occupied by a Jacobite force, and hosted King James II as he passed en route to the Siege of Derry. In 2007, the castle was partially excavated by the Channel 4 archaeological show Time Team, uncovering part of the moat and walls of the castle.

=== 18th Century ===
==== Volunteer conventions ====
In 1782, as the "most central town of Ulster", Dungannon was chosen as the site for a convention of the Volunteers. Initially formed for defence against the French in the American War of Independence, the Volunteers had increasingly been agitated by the same kinds of grievances driving rebellion among their kinsmen in America (among them, local emigrants who, in the foothills of the Appalachian Mountains, had established the township of Dungannon, Virginia).

Delegates from 147 Volunteer corps assembled at the Presbyterian church on Scotch Street, previously favoured as a meeting place for the Presbyterian Synod of Ulster. Taking on "the substance of a national assembly", the Convention resolved that the right asserted by the British Crown to overrule the Irish Parliament in Dublin, and to legislate for Ireland from Westminster, was "unconstitutional" and "illegal".

Two further Volunteer conventions were held in Dungannon, in 1783 and 1793. In the context, of debating reform of the Irish parliament, the Volunteers divided over the question of Catholic emancipation, Protestants alone having the right to vote, to assume office and to carry arms. They also divided on the question of parliamentary reform. The Protestants of Dungannon had no elected representation as the town was one of Ireland's many pocket boroughs. Its MP was the nominee of its proprietor, Thomas Knox, 1st Viscount Northland.

==== Orangemen and United men ====
Local veterans of Volunteer movement broke into two camps; those who joined the new-formed Orangemen, sworn to uphold the Protestant Ascendancy, in forming a loyal yeomanry, and those who, having taken the United Irish oath "to obtain an equal, full and adequate representation of all the people of Ireland", began raiding the homesteads of these yeomen to procure arms and gunpowder.

Martial law imposed on the area from January 1797, broke the local United Irish organisation. The rebellion in the summer of 1798, which saw risings in counties Antrim and Down, was chiefly marked in Dungannon by courts martial in which United Irishmen were sentenced to floggings and to penal transportation.

=== 19th century ===
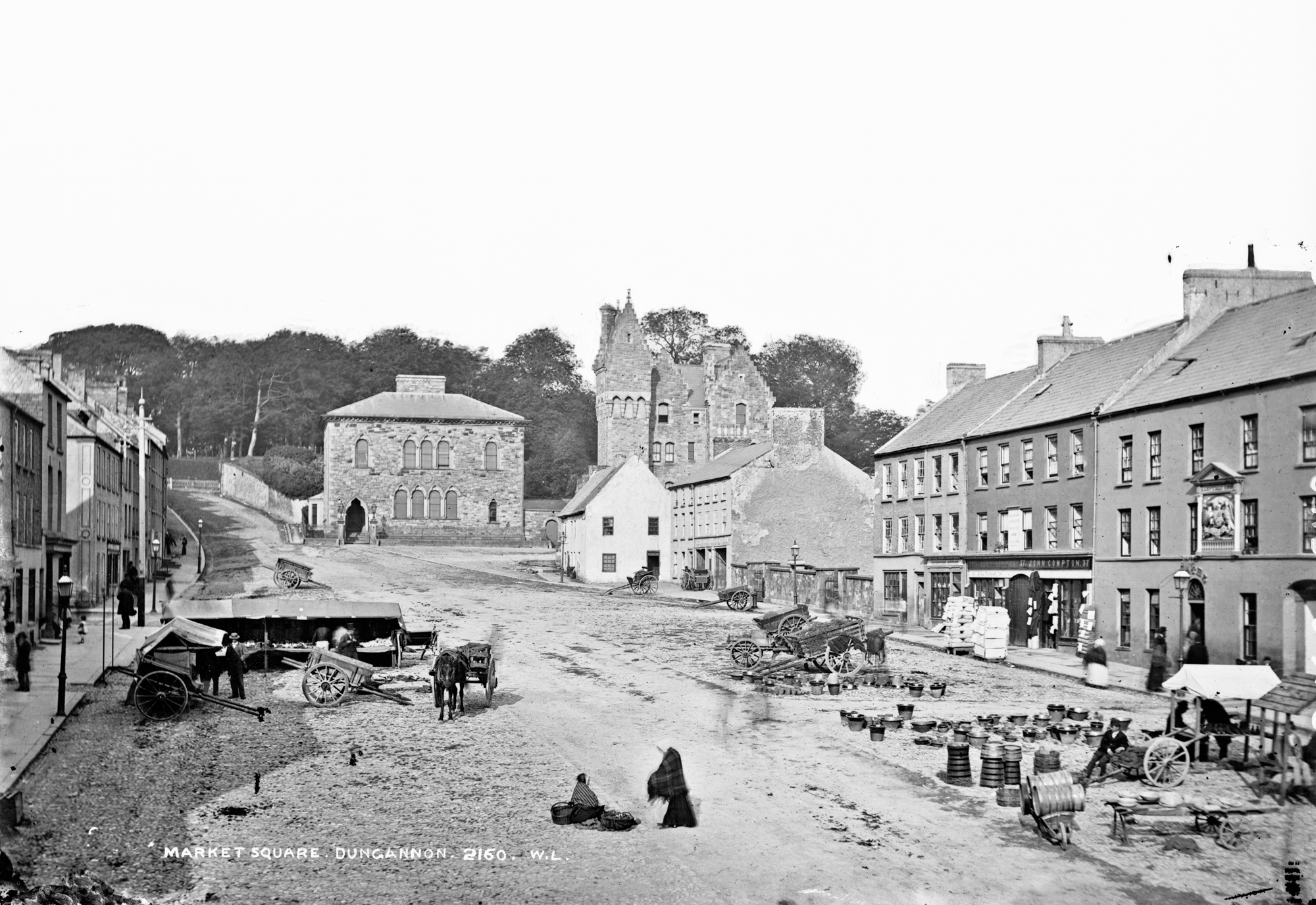
Dungannon Market Square c 1880

==== Linen ====
The town in which the Volunteers had gathered, was still largely a settlement of thatched houses. But by 1802, a surveyor for the Dublin Society was able to describe it as "one of the most prosperous towns in the North of Ireland in the linen trade," and as "inferior" to no other "for its rapid progress in building". In the 1820s and 30s, buyers for the bleachers would come from Belfast every Thursday and take their places on the "standings" on the east side of Market Square where the farmers brought their "webs" of raw, unbleached linen woven by their families and servants.

==== The Workhouse ====
In 1842, following the application to Ireland of the new English Poor Law system of Workhouses (an alternative to outdoor relief, that made it easier for landlords to clear their estates in favour of larger English-export-oriented farms), a Workhouse was built in Dungannon. Until its closure in 1948, about 1000 people passed through its doors. A memorial on the former site, now the grounds of the South Tyrone Hospital, commemorates "all those who sought shelter" within its walls. This includes the victims of the Great Famine and the attendant cholera and typhus. Among these were the "Irish Famine Orphan Girls", a group of young women sent from the workhouse to Australia between 1848 and 1850.

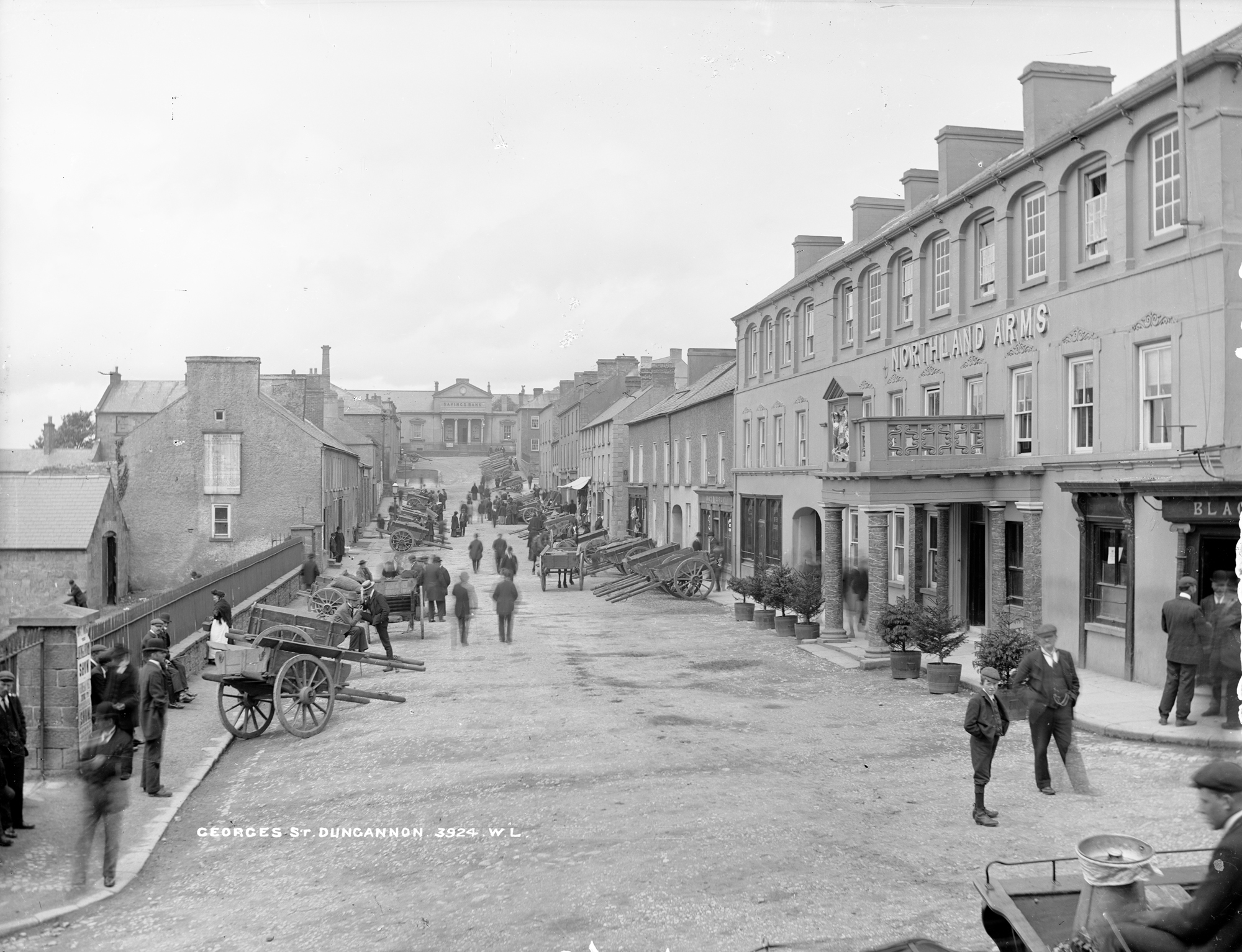
Georges Street in the late 19th century

==== Tenant agitation ====
In 1834, Dungannon had again been the venue for a regional convention: upwards of 75,000 people attended a "Great Protestant Meeting" called by the sometime Moderator of the Presbyterian Church in Ireland, Henry Cooke and by Tory grandees. Landlords and their retinues were joined by parading Orangemen. Locally, the call for Protestant unity was not well heeded. Tithes levied atop rents on behalf of the established Church of Ireland, failure to respect the protections of the Ulster Custom, and rack renting, set tenant farmers, Protestant and Catholic alike, at odds with the landed gentry.They were drawn to the Tenant Right League, and subsequently the direct-action Irish National Land League.

With the introduction in 1872 of the secret ballot, landlords and their agents who, in the traditional hustings, had been able to monitor how their tenants voted, could no longer secure the election of Conservative candidates for Parliament. In 1874, Dungannon elected Thomas Alexander Dickson (of Milltown House), an independent Liberal who offered himself as an opponent of "rack renting and serfdom", and in 1880 his son James Dickson.

From 1886, the Dickson legacy was sustained in an enlarged South Tyrone constituency by Thomas Russell, champion of the Ulster Farmers and Labourers Union, MP until 1910 when, after being addressed in a series of land acts, agrarian issues were overshadowed by the return to the political agenda of Irish home rule. The town, meanwhile, had not been free of sectarian tensions. In 1880, police had used buckshot, killing one and wounding several, to quell rioting in the town after Orangemen had sacked houses in Listamlet.

=== Twentieth Century ===
==== Unionist-Nationalist division ====
In 1913, 1,200 Ulster Volunteers paraded before Sir Edward Carson, leader of the unionist, almost exclusively Protestant, opposition to Irish self-government. The nationalist response, was the formation of the Irish Volunteers, whose membership in Tyrone, standing at 8,600 on the eve of the Great War in July 1914, was double that of Carson's Volunteers in the county. In the town itself (now the Dungannon District Electoral Area) unionists continued to dominate electorally until the end of the century (nationalists--Sinn Féin, the SDLP and a Republican independent—won their first majority, four of six councillors, in 2023).

==== Housing and civil rights protest ====
Dungannon in early 1960s was described as "an average country town" with a population of around seven thousand, "half Protestant, half Catholic". The "best, and largest, firms", including the town's two textile factories, were Protestant owned, and "the upper echelons of the workforce were virtually all Protestant". For working-class Catholics the most "crushing problem" was the housing shortage, as the one ward in which Nationalist (Catholic) councillors could assign tenancies had seen no new houses built by the Unionist-controlled council.

In a reference to the black American civil-rights struggle, women and children protesting housing policy outside a meeting of the Dungannon Urban District Council in May 1963 held a placard with the slogan "If Our Religion Is Against Us Ship Us to Little Rock". Three months later, 17 families squatted an estate of pre-fabricated bungalows at Fairmount Park in protest, the beginning of a campaign for an independent points-based system of housing allocation.

On 24 August 1968, the Campaign for Social Justice (CSJ), launched in the town by Councillor Patricia McCluskey and her husband Conn, a local GP, the Northern Ireland Civil Rights Association (NICRA), and other groups organised Northern Ireland's first civil rights march from Coalisland to Dungannon in solidarity. The rally was officially banned, but took place and passed off without incident. Many more marches were held over the following year. In the build-up toward the sustained political violence of the Troubles, loyalists attacked some of the marches and held counter-demonstrations in a bid to get the marches banned.

==== The Troubles ====
During the Troubles, the Dungannon district suffered numerous bombings, and almost 50 people were killed in and around the town. The two deadliest attacks involved, in March 1976, the Ulster Volunteer Force detonating a car bomb outside a pub crowded with people celebrating Saint Patrick's Day, and, in December 1979, a land-mine ambush of a British Army patrol by the Provisional Irish Republican Army (IRA). The Hillcrest Bar bombing, on Donaghmore Road, killed four civilians—including two 13-year-old boys standing outside—and injured almost 50 people. The land-mine attack against British Army Land Rovers on the Ballygawley Road, killed four British soldiers.

The most extensive property damage was caused in March 1979 by a 50lb IRA bomb that destroyed a bank and a row of shops on Scotch street.

==== Survey of the town, 1971 ====
In a survey, published in 1971 by the Ulster Architectural Heritage Society, the site of the town on the southern slope of the Castle Hill, running down to the Rhone river, is described as "impressive". Note is made of the "careful planting and parkland, inherited from the 18th and early 19th centuries" which forms a "continuous swathe of natural beauty stretching from Killymeal in the north through Windmill Wood, Ballynorthland, Milltown and Mullaghanagh to terminate in Ballysaggart Lough", and that the skyline remains "dominated by the spires of the principal churches, St. Patrick's, St. Anne's and the tower of the Presbyterian church". The authors were less sanguine about contemporary developments, and sounded a warning note for the future:

The principal streets of the old town, Ann Street, Irish Street, Scotch Street, Church Street, Perry Street and Northland Row, retain most of their original buildings but in general, though with a significant number of individual exceptions, their character is being surely eroded by neglect or thoughtless alterations and by traffic. While the centre quietly decays, new building spreads in a sporadic rash in all directions, gradually choking the impressive glimpses of the countryside which the elevation of the central area can afford, reaching as far as the Mourne Mountains and hills of Armagh. Ballynorthland demesne and Dungannon Park retain most of their ornamental timber, one of the town's finest remaining assets, but positive steps must be taken to prevent their being allowed to decay and engulfed through the seeming apathy and indifference of the townspeople to their inheritance.

=== 21st century, new immigrant population ===
From the 1990s, employers in the town, and in particularly the food processors, began employing immigrant labour. It was a development that made headlines in December 2005 when an altercation was reported between Lithuanian and East Timorese workers in a parking lot outside Moy Park. Moy Park, a poultry processor, founded in 1943 in the neighbouring village of Moygashel, is the town's largest employer. In addition to the East Timorese, labour recruiters have brought other Portuguese-speaking workers to Dungannon, so that today the town also has residents born in Portugal, Brazil, and Mozambique.

The 2021 Census recorded over a third of the town's population as born outside of the British Isles, by far the largest share of any settlement in Northern Ireland. In 2019, Dungannon Primary School was rated "one of the most diverse schools in Northern Ireland, as almost two-thirds of its 281 pupils are from families who originally came here from other countries".

In a blow to the local food-processing economy, in January 2026 ABP Foods announced its intention to cease retail packing at its packing facility in Granville Industrial Estate in Dungannon, with a loss of 338 jobs.

== Demography ==
From the famine years of the 1840s through to the end of the 19th century, the population of the town scarcely grew. Modest growth in the twentieth century, was reversed during the period of the Troubles, but from the 1990s Dungannon became one of the fastest growing towns in Northern Ireland.

| Year | 1841 | 1891 | 1961 | 1991 | 2001 | 2011 | 2021 |
|---|---|---|---|---|---|---|---|
| Population | 3,801 | 3,812 | 6,511 | 4,407 | 10,983 | 14,340 | 16,282 |

=== 2011 census ===
Dungannon had a population of 14,340 at the 2011 census, rising by 3,349 (over 30%) from 10,983 in 2001. The growth, unparalleled in Northern Ireland, was driven by the highest percentage of immigrants of any town in Northern Ireland. Immigrants made up about 11% of Dungannon population; more than twice the Northern Ireland average, their numbers having increased tenfold over the previous decade.

On census day in 2011 (27 March 2011), there were 14,340 people living in Dungannon (5,388 households), accounting for 0.79% of the NI total. Of these:

- 22.01% were aged under 16 years and 12.09% were aged 65 and over;
- 50.33% of the usually resident population were female and 49.67% were male;
- 64.82% belong to or were brought up in the Catholic Christian faith, 30.46% belong to or were brought up in a 'Protestant and Other Christian (including Christian related)' religion;
- 31.63% had an Irish national identity, 28.27% indicated that they had a British national identity and 23.93% had a Northern Irish national identity (respondents could indicate more than one national identity);
- 34 years was the average (median) age of the population;
- 15.93% had some knowledge of Irish (Gaeilge), 4.82% had some knowledge of Ulster-Scots and 23.18% did not have English as their first language.

=== 2021 census ===
National Identity of Dungannon residents (2021)
| Nationality | Per cent |
| Irish | 27.2% |
| British | 22.0% |
| Northern Irish | 19.6% |

In the 2021 census, Dungannon was recorded as having a population of 16,282, a 13.5% increase from 2011. Of these:

- 34.85% of the town's population was recorded as foreign-born (born outside the United Kingdom and Ireland), by far the largest of any settlement in Northern Ireland.
- The largest foreign-born communities are East Timorese (1,777 people), Lithuanian (1,565 people), Polish (717 people) and Portuguese (578 people).
- 67.15% of the population belong to or were brought up in the Catholic Christian faith, 24.25% belong to or were brought up in a 'Protestant and Other Christian (including Christian related)' religion, and 1.63% belonged to or were brought up in an other religion. 6.96% either declared no religion or did not state their religion.
- 22.45% were aged under 16 years and 12.48% were aged 65 or over.
- 49.24% of the usually resident population were female and 50.76% were male.
- 15.38% had some knowledge of the Irish language, 6.97% had some knowledge of Ulster-Scots and 31.52% did not have English as their first language.
- 27.15% had an Irish national identity, 21.98% had a British national identity and 19.64% had a Northern Irish national identity (respondents could indicate more than one national identity).

Religion or religion brought up in (2021 census)
| Religion or religion brought up in | Number | (%) |
| Catholic: Total | 10,934 | 67.15 |
|---|---|---|
| Catholic: British/Irish/Northern Irish/English/Scottish/Welsh (with or without non-UK or Irish national identities) | 6,117 | 37.57 |
| Catholic: Other | 4,817 | 29.58 |
| Protestant and Other Christian: Total | 3,950 | 24.25 |
| Protestant/Other Christian: British/Irish/Northern Irish/English/Scottish/Welsh (with or without non-UK or Irish national identities) | 3,534 | 21.70 |
| Protestant/Other Christian: Other | 416 | 2.55 |
| Other religions: Total | 265 | 1.63 |
| Other religions: British/Irish/Northern Irish/English/Scottish/Welsh (with or without non-UK or Irish national identities) | 114 | 0.70 |
| Other religions: Other | 151 | 0.93 |
| None: Total | 1,134 | 6.96 |
| None: British/Irish/Northern Irish/English/Scottish/Welsh (with or without non-UK or Irish national identities) | 441 | 2.71 |
| None: Other | 693 | 4.25 |
| Total | 16,282 | 100.00 |

Ethnic groups (2021 census)
| Ethnic group | Number | (%) |
| White: Total | 13,032 | 80.04 |
|---|---|---|
| White: British/Irish/Northern Irish/English/Scottish/Welsh (with or without non-UK or Irish national identities) | 9,393 | 57.69 |
| White: Other | 3,487 | 21.42 |
| White: Irish Traveller | 118 | 0.72 |
| White: Roma | 35 | 0.21 |
| Black or Black British: Total | 1,267 | 7.78 |
| Black/Black British: Black African | 341 | 2.09 |
| Black/Black British: Black Other | 926 | 5.69 |
| Asian or Asian British: Total | 1,182 | 7.26 |
| Asian/Asian British: Other Asian | 959 | 5.89 |
| Asian/Asian British: Chinese | 86 | 0.53 |
| Asian/Asian British: Indian | 76 | 0.47 |
| Asian/Asian British: Arab | 33 | 0.20 |
| Asian/Asian British: Filipino | 20 | 0.12 |
| Asian/Asian British: Pakistani | 8 | 0.05 |
| Mixed: Total | 641 | 3.94 |
| Other: Any other ethnic group: Total | 160 | 0.98 |
| Total | 16,282 | 100.00 |

Country of birth (2021 census)
| Country of birth | Number | (%) |
| United Kingdom and Ireland | 10,607 | 65.15 |
|---|---|---|
| Northern Ireland | 9,890 | 60.74 |
| England | 389 | 2.39 |
| Scotland | 61 | 0.37 |
| Wales | 9 | 0.06 |
| Republic of Ireland | 258 | 1.58 |
| Europe | 3,336 | 20.49 |
| European Union | 3,272 | 20.10 |
| European Union: Lithuania | 1,565 | 9.61 |
| European Union: Poland | 717 | 4.40 |
| European Union: Portugal | 578 | 3.55 |
| European Union: Other EU countries | 412 | 2.53 |
| Other non-EU countries | 64 | 0.39 |
| Rest of World | 2,339 | 14.37 |
| Middle East and Asia | 1,996 | 12.26 |
| Middle East/Asia: East Timor | 1,777 | 10.91 |
| Middle East/Asia: Other | 219 | 1.35 |
| Africa | 223 | 1.37 |
| South America | 75 | 0.46 |
| North America, Central America and Caribbean | 36 | 0.22 |
| Antarctica, Oceania and Other | 9 | 0.06 |
| Total | 16,282 | 100.00 |

== Places of interest ==
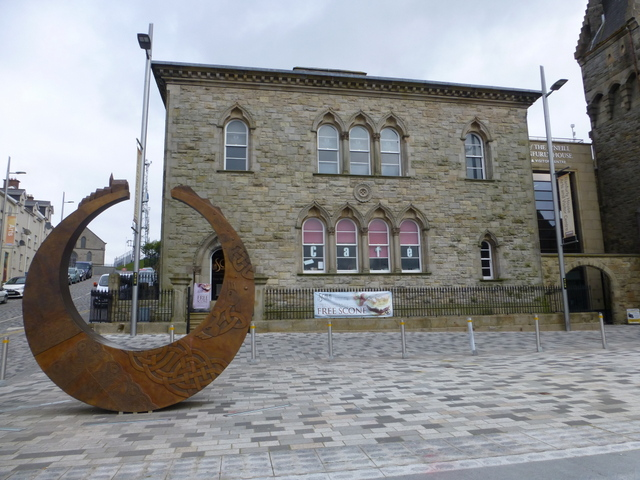
Ranfurly House in Dungannon's market square

An interesting feature of the town is the former Royal Irish Constabulary barracks at the northeastern corner of the market square which is quite unlike any other police barracks of a similar vintage in Ireland. A popular but apocryphal story relates that the unusual design of this building is due to a mix-up with the plans in Dublin which meant Dungannon got a station designed for Nepal and they got a standard Irish barracks, complete with a traditional Irish fireplace. Dungannon Park covers 70 acres (28 hectares); it is centred round an idyllic still-water lake, with miles of pathways and views of the surrounding townland.

== Geography ==
Dungannon is in the southeast of County Tyrone, within the historic barony of Dungannon Middle and the civil parish of Drumglass.

The town grew up around a hill, known locally as Castle Hill. There are three small lakes on the southern edge of town, the biggest of which is Black Lough. There are also two parks in the eastern part of town: Dungannon Park and Windmill Wood Park.

=== Townlands ===
Dungannon sprang up in a townland called Drumcoo. Over time, the urban area has spread into the neighbouring townlands. Many of its roads and housing estates are named after them. The following is a list of these townlands and their likely etymologies:

- Ballynorthland Park
- Ballysaggart (from Irish Baile na Sagart, meaning 'homestead of the priests')
- Coolhill (from Collchoill, 'hazelwood')
- Drumcoo (from Druim Chuaiche, 'ridge of the cuckoo')
- Drumharriff (from Druim Thairbh, 'ridge of the bull')
- Gortmerron (from Gort Mearáin, 'Mearán's field')
- Killymaddy (from Coill na Madadh, 'wood of the dogs')
- Killymeal (from Coill na Maoile, 'wood of the bald/hornless cow', historically Kinameale, from ceann meaning "hillock")
- Lisnaclin (historically Lismaglyn, from Lios Mhic Fhloinn, 'Macklin's ringfort')
- Lisnahull (historically Lissacull, probably from Lios a' Choill, 'ringfort of the hazel')
- Lurgaboy (from an Lurga Bhuí, 'the yellow shin' i.e. shin-shaped hill)
- Mullaghadun (from Mullach a' Dúin, 'hilltop of the fort')
- Mullaghanagh (historically Mullanahay, from Mullán na hÁithe, 'hillock of the kiln')
- Mullaghconor Glebe (from Mullach Conchobhair, 'Conchobhar's summit')
- Mullaghmore (from Mullach Mór, 'big hilltop')

== Economy ==
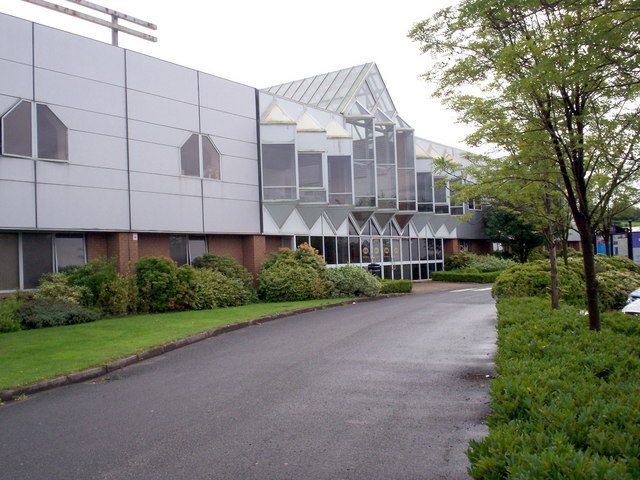
The then Tyrone Crystal building in Dungannon (2008)

Moy Park, a poultry processor whose ultimate parent company is now the Brazilian meatpacking giant JBS N. V.., remains the town's principal employer and (with a turnover of more than £2bn in 2023) is one of Northern Ireland's largest private-sector employers overall. The town has a major a major red meat processing and wholesale facility operated by Dunbia, another local firm that has found an outside purchaser, the Irish meat processing company Dawn Meats.

In 2024, the U.S. multinational Terex opened a new headquarters in Dungannon for its local subsidiary Powerscreen, a manufacturer of lifting and materials processing equipment and a leading engineering employer in the region.

== Schools ==
There are over a dozen primary schools in the area. Secondary schools include the Royal School Dungannon, Integrated College Dungannon, St Patrick's Academy, Drumglass High School and St Patricks's College.

== Transport ==
Dungannon is linked to the M1 motorway, which runs from the southeast of the town to Belfast. There is an Ulsterbus town bus service that runs daily that serves the town's suburbs, formerly operated by the Optare Solo buses. The nearest railway station is Portadown on Northern Ireland Railways.

=== Former railways ===
The Irish gauge 1,600 mm (5 ft 3 in) Portadown, Dungannon and Omagh Junction Railway (PD&O) linked the town with Portadown from 1858 and Omagh from 1861, completing the Portadown – Derry railway route that came to be informally called "The Derry Road". The Great Northern Railway took over the PD&O in 1876 and built a branch line from Dungannon to Cookstown in 1879.

The GNR Board cut back the Cookstown branch to Coalisland in 1956 and the Ulster Transport Authority (UTA) closed the branch altogether in 1959. In accordance with the Benson Report submitted to the Government of Northern Ireland 1963 the UTA closed the "Derry Road" through Dungannon in 1965. The site of Dungannon station is now a public park and the former trackbed through the station is now a greenway.

== Notable people ==
- Darren Clarke (born 1968) – professional golfer
- Thomas J. Clarke (1858–1916) – first signatory of the 1916 Proclamation of the Irish Republic; executed by the British authorities
- Dixie Paumier Clement – Irish-born Australian physician and obstetrician
- Austin Currie (1939–2021) – former member of the Parliament of Northern Ireland and Dáil Éireann, attended St Patrick's Academy in Dungannon.
- Bernadette Devlin McAliskey (born 1947) – former British MP; Irish republican activist, attended St Patrick's Girls Academy in Dungannon.
- Richard Dowse (1824–1890) – judge
- Ryan Farquhar (born 1976) – motorcycle racer
- Fra Fee (born 1987) – film, stage actor
- Dominic Gates (born 1954/1955) – journalist and Pulitzer Prize winner
- Adrian Logan (born 1955) – television presenter
- Patricia McCluskey (1914–2010) local councillor, civil rights activist.
- Michaella McCollum Connolly – criminal (convicted drug smuggler)
- Gerry McGeough (born 1958) – Provisional Irish Republican Army volunteer; prison escapee.
- Niall McGinn (born 1987) – footballer, Dungannon Swifts.
- Gerry McKenna (born 1953) – MRIA, biologist, Senior Vice President of the Royal Irish Academy, Vice Chancellor and President of University of Ulster
- Kris Meeke (born 1979) – rally driver
- Colin Morgan (born 1986) – actor, attended Integrated College Dungannon
- Sister Nivedita (born Margaret Elizabeth Noble) (1867–1911) – social worker, author, teacher and disciple of Swami Vivekananda
- George T. Oliver (1848–1919) – U.S. Senator
- Henry W. Oliver (1840–1904) – Pittsburgh industrialist
- Joanne Salley (born 1977) – television presenter
- Victor Sloan (born 1945) – artist
- Thomas Wilson Spence (1846–1912) – Wisconsin lawyer and state politician
- Gareth Steenson (born 1984) – rugby union player
- Birdy Sweeney (1931–1999) – actor
- Patrick Wallace (born 1969) – snooker player

== Sport ==
=== Cricket ===
Dungannon Cricket Club was established in 1865. Attempts were made to re-establish the club after the First World War and this was done in 1929 and survived until 1933 when Lord Ranfurly died, which for a second time left the club without a ground. Cricket was kept alive by the Royal School, Bankers and the RUC until 1939 when the Second World War broke out. The club was reformed in 1948 mainly due to the efforts of Eddie Hodgett and the NCU leagues in 1952 and continues to do so to the present time. The club has played on at least five different locations during its existence. Home games are played at Dungannon Park.

=== Football ===
Dungannon Swifts F.C. is the town's local team, which plays in the NIFL Premiership, and is Tyrone's only representative in the league, following Omagh Town's collapse. The club represented Northern Ireland in European competition in the 2006 UEFA Intertoto Cup and the 2007–08 UEFA Cup.

=== Gaelic games ===
The local boys' Gaelic football club is Dungannon Thomas Clarkes (Thomáis Uí Chléirigh Dún Geanainn) while the ladies' football team is Aodh a Ruadh.

=== Greyhound racing ===
Greyhound racing was once a popular sport in Dungannon. The Dungannon Greyhound Stadium was opened in July 1930, the third track in Northern Ireland after Celtic Park and Dunmore Stadium. The stadium, also known as the Oaks Park Greyhound Stadium, remained operational until January 2003 when it was closed by Dungannon (Oaks Park) Stadium Greyhound Racing Limited who had taken over the track in 1995 and saw the opportunity to make a substantial profit by developing the site.

=== Rugby ===
Dungannon Rugby FC, founded in 1873, was one of the first towns in Ireland to form a rugby club.

=== Other sports ===
Dungannon Golf Club, which has an 18-hole course, appointed its first woman captain in January 2022.

While there has been a hare coursing club in Dungannon since the 1920s, as the practice is banned in Northern Ireland, the club organises meetings in the Republic of Ireland.

== See also ==
- Abbeys and priories in Northern Ireland (County Tyrone)
- List of towns and villages in Northern Ireland
- List of localities in Northern Ireland by population

== Sources ==
- Clarke, Aidan (2004). "Jones, Sir Theophilus". Oxford Dictionary of National Biography (online ed.). Oxford University Press. doi:10.1093/ref:odnb/15084. (Subscription, Wikipedia Library access or UK public library membership required.)
- McCavitt, John (2004). "Chichester, Arthur, Baron Chichester". Oxford Dictionary of National Biography (online ed.). Oxford University Press. doi:10.1093/ref:odnb/5274. (Subscription, Wikipedia Library access or UK public library membership required.)
- Royle, Trevor (2004). Civil War: The Wars of the Three Kingdoms 1638–1660. Abacus. ISBN 978-0-349-11564-1.
