= Civil rights movement (disambiguation) =

The civil rights movement was the social and political movement in the United States between 1954 and 1968.

Civil rights movement may also refer to:

- Civil rights movement (1865–1896), the Reconstruction era and post-Reconstruction era in the United States
- Civil rights movement (1896–1954), the Jim Crow era in the United States
- Civil rights movement, the social and political movement in Northern Ireland also known as the Northern Ireland civil rights movement

== See also ==
- Civil rights movements, social and political movements
