= Dungannon Greyhound Stadium =

Former greyhound racing stadium in Northern Ireland

- Interactive map of Dungannon Greyhound Stadium
- Location: Oaks Road; Dungannon, County Tyrone, BT71 4BA, Northern Ireland
- Coordinates: 54°30′40″N 6°45′36″W

Construction
- Opened: 1930
- Closed: 2003

Dungannon Greyhound Stadium or Oaks Park was a greyhound racing track held on Oaks Road, Dungannon, County Tyrone, BT71 4BA, Northern Ireland.

== History ==
Dungannon became the third Northern Irish greyhound track behind Celtic Park and Dunmore Stadium in July 1930. Being a greyhound track in Northern Ireland it was neither under the jurisdiction of the National Greyhound Racing Club which was the governing body for UK Tracks or the Bord na gCon (the Irish Greyhound Board) which is the governing body for Irish tracks, the latter did however publish the results for Northern Ireland.

The track was 485 yards in circumference and racing took place every Tuesday or Wednesday, Thursday and Saturday evening and used an Outside Sumner hare system.

The Ulster Oaks was introduced in 1970 establishing itself as the main event run at the track. Other competitions of note were the Mick Horan Puppy Championship (Horan was Mick the Miller's first trainer), the Tuborg Viceroy Cup and the Harry McCrory Memorial Cup (McCrory had a 30-year association with the track).

In 1962 Tommy McCombe became the General and Racing Manager after Clones closed.

In 1990 a fire destroyed a large part of the main stand around the same time that a letter was sent to the Bord na gCon threatening further attacks on the racecourse unless they stopped supporting coursing clubs.

== Closure ==
The Dungannon (Oaks Park) Stadium Greyhound Racing Limited who had taken over the track in 1995 saw the opportunity to make a substantial profit by developing the site and the track closed down in 2003. It was not until 2011 that planning permission was granted for 120 mixed residential dwellings, with a Sainsbury's shopping centre to the West and Dunlea Vale directly to the North. In 2014 the derelict grandstand was subject to an arson attack and completely destroyed.

== Track records ==
Yards	Greyhound	Time (sec)	Date	Notes/ref
325	Millionaire	18.11	1950	
325	Hi Spy	17.65	1970	
325	Kensington Lil	17.64	7 October 1969	
325	Cornetto	17.62	1970	
325	Beautiful Sara	17.35	15 September 1982	
325	Hard Ecu	17.27	17 October 1991	
325	Cassie Boy	17.25	5 February 1992	
400	Belmont Villa	33.55	13 June 1990	
500	Head Over	29.96	1950	
500	Stoneville Queen	28.17	1970	
500	Kensington Lil	27.64	c.1970	
500	Sheilas Emma		1979	
500	Stradey Park	27.92	July 1981	
500	Easterly Gale	27.70	4 August 1984	
500	Rooskey Rose	27.65	4 April 1990	
500	Praidora	27.50	14 August 1991	
500	Speedy Shane	27.08	7 July 1999	
525	Paulas Pal	29.18	1960	
525	Leitrim Solo	29.06	1981	
525	Chief Ironside	28.80	11 June 1984	
525	Glenhill Pride	28.70	14 August 1991	
525	Gems Whisper	28.65	29 April 1992	
550	Kilcool Mounty	31.97	1950	
550	Newdown Son	31.33	1970	
550	Dicks Bridge	30.91	1978	
550	Merchants Bound	30.75	1980	
550	Carters Lad	30.05	27 May 1987	
550	Glenhill Pride	29.75	9 October 1991	
600	Rose Velvet	33.78	1960	
600	Brookvale Pride	33.57	11 June 1981	
780	Twelfth Man	45.29	1970	
780	Rosevale Desire	44.67	1980	
780	Moyletra	44.40	15 September 1982	
780	Braccan Connie	43.94	9 October 1991	
325 hurdles	Calrossie Morning Star	19.39	1960	
525 hurdles	Maggies Pup	31.75	1950	

== Ulster Oaks Winners ==
- 1971 Kilwoney Rose
- 1972 Trace of Red
- 1973 Ashling Ban
- 1974 Rokeel Rebel
- 1975 Bright Evening
- 1976 Kisses For Me
- 1998 Toumpane Valley
- 1999 Rosalettos Girl
- 2000 Tullymurry Tango
- 2001 Shanless Park
- 2002 Baltic Star
