= Patricia McCluskey =

Civil rights activist

- Born: Patricia McShane; 1914; Portadown
- Died: 2010

Patricia McCluskey (1914–2010) was a Northern Ireland civil rights activist.

== Biography ==
Patricia McCluskey was born Patricia McShane in 1914 in Portadown. Her father ran a drapery business. McCluskey trained as a home economics teacher in Scotland. During World War II McCluskey was working on evacuating children from cities into rural areas. McCluskey founded the Homeless Citizens League in 1963. They held what was to be the first march of the civil rights movement in Dungannon in June. She was also a founder of the Campaign for Social Justice. She was a councilor for the Dungannon Urban Council, elected in 1964 along with four other nationalists. McCluskey held the role for more than ten years. She focused on ending discrimination in housing and jobs, collecting evidence and presenting it to the public. She spoke at a rally in Manchester in 1966 when she talked about how Northern Ireland Catholics wanted to live in harmony with their Protestant neighbours and this movement was aiming towards that end. She was also a member of the Northern Ireland Civil Rights Association.

== Personal life ==
McCluskey married Conn McCluskey, a doctor and fellow activist. They lived in Keady and Dungannon. The couple had three daughters. When they retired the couple travelled Australia before they moved to Dublin. McCluskey died in 2010.
