= McAleney =

McAleney is a surname. Notable people with the surname include:

- Ed McAleney (born 1953), American footballer
- James S. McAleney (born 1969), Canadian jockey

== See also ==
- McAlevey
