= Conn McCluskey =

Irish civil rights activist and doctor

Conn McCluskey (1914 – 16 December 2013) was an Irish civil rights activist in the 1960s, and a medical doctor.

Born in County Down, McCluskey was working as a general practitioner in Dungannon, County Tyrone, in 1963, when along with his wife Patricia he founded the Homeless Citizens' League to draw attention to discrimination against the Catholic population in the allocation of public housing by the unionist-controlled local council. On 17 January 1964 the couple established the Campaign for Social Justice, with Patricia McCluskey as the first chairwoman, to broaden the focus of their campaign to cover all aspects of discrimination against the one-third Catholic minority in Northern Ireland.

A pamphlet written by the McCluskeys, The Plain Truth, drew widespread attention to the issues. In January 1967 they helped to found the Northern Ireland Civil Rights Association (NICRA), which became the main vehicle for the civil rights campaign that, following repressive counter-measures by the unionist government, was followed by the 30-year conflict known as The Troubles.

In 1969, when a vacancy arose in the Mid-Ulster UK Parliamentary constituency, the McCluskeys organised a Unity Convention resulting in the nomination of Bernadette Devlin as the single, and victorious, anti-unionist candidate.

Patricia McCluskey served for a time as an elected councillor in Dungannon, but the couple were not prominent in public life after the onset of the Troubles. In 1989 Conn published a memoir of their campaigning, Up Off Their Knees.

The McCluskeys retired to Dublin, where Patricia died in 2010, aged 96. Conn died in 2013, and was buried in Burren, County Down.

An annual McCluskey Civil Rights Summer School was established in Carlingford, County Louth, in 2008.
