= Civil rights movements =

Worldwide social and political movements against racism

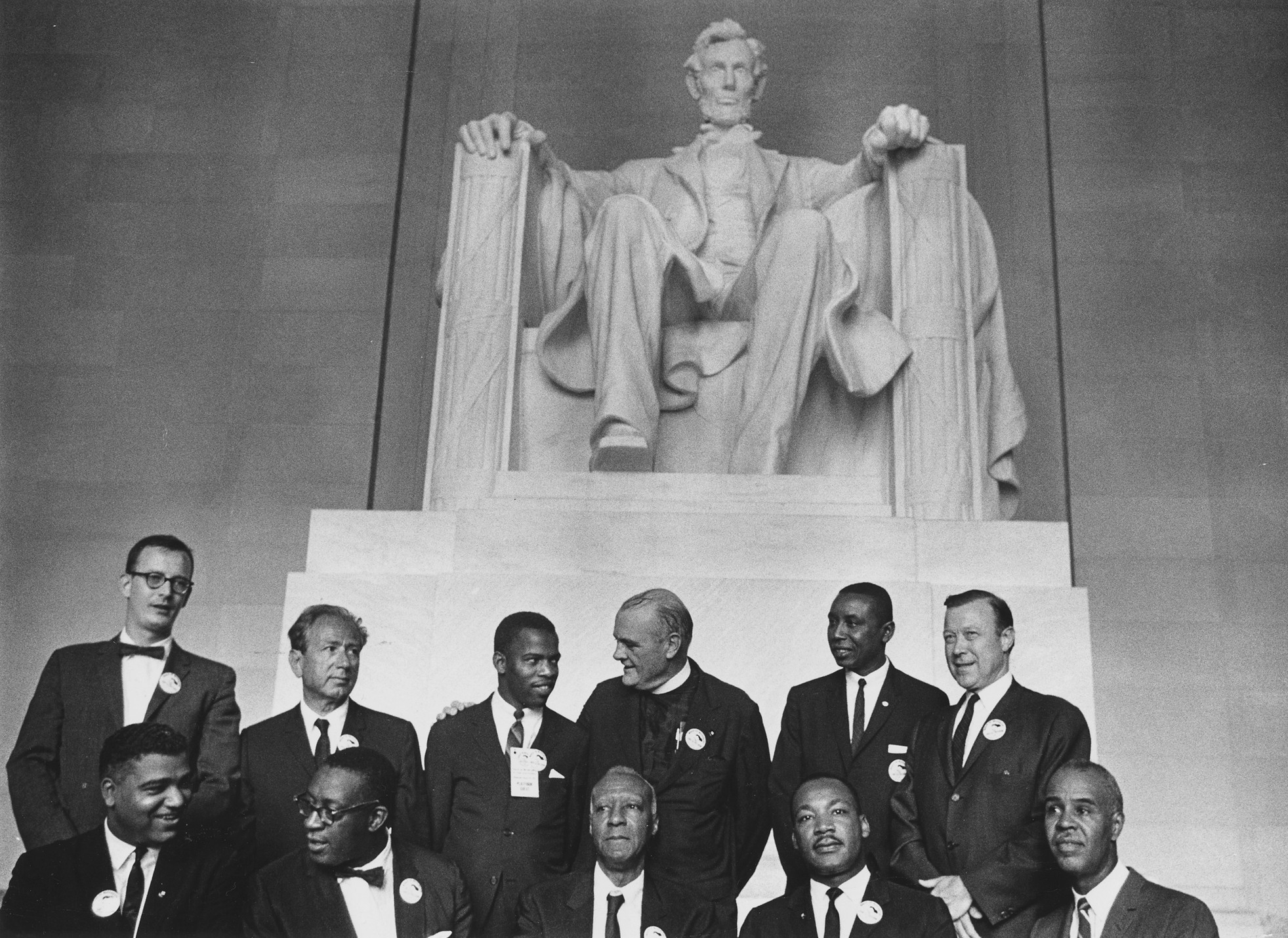
Martin Luther King Jr. and other civil rights movement leaders in front of the statue of Abraham Lincoln during the March on Washington, August 28, 1963

Civil rights movements are a worldwide series of political movements for equality before the law, that peaked in the 1960s. In many situations they have been characterized by nonviolent protests, or have taken the form of campaigns of civil resistance aimed at achieving change through nonviolent forms of resistance. In some situations, they have been accompanied, or followed, by civil unrest and armed rebellion. The process has been long and tenuous in many countries, and many of these movements did not, or have yet to, fully achieve their goals, although the efforts of these movements have led to improvements in the legal rights of some previously oppressed groups of people, in some places.

The main aim of the successful 1954-1968 American civil rights movement, and other social movements for civil rights, included ensuring that the rights of all people were and are equally protected by the law. These include but are not limited to the rights of minorities, women's rights, disability rights and LGBT rights.

== Northern Ireland civil rights movement ==
Northern Ireland is a part of the United Kingdom which has witnessed violence over many decades, known as the Troubles, arising from tensions between the British (Unionist, Protestant) majority and the Irish (Nationalist, Catholic) minority following the Partition of Ireland in 1920.

The civil rights struggle in Northern Ireland can be traced to activists in Dungannon, led by Austin Currie, who were fighting for equal access to public housing for the members of the Catholic community. This domestic issue would not have led to a fight for civil rights were it not for the fact that being a registered householder was a qualification for local government franchise in Northern Ireland.

In January 1964, the Campaign for Social Justice (CSJ) was launched in Belfast. This organisation joined the struggle for better housing and committed itself to ending discrimination in employment. The CSJ promised the Catholic community that their cries would be heard. They challenged the government and promised that they would take their case to the Commission for Human Rights in Strasbourg and to the United Nations.

Having started with basic domestic issues, the civil rights struggle in Northern Ireland escalated to a full-scale movement that found its embodiment in the Northern Ireland Civil Rights Association. NICRA campaigned in the late sixties and early seventies, consciously modelling itself on the American civil rights movement and using similar methods of civil resistance. NICRA organised marches and protests to demand equal rights and an end to discrimination.

NICRA originally had five main demands:

- one man, one vote
- an end to discrimination in housing
- an end to discrimination in local government
- an end to the gerrymandering of district boundaries, which limited the effect of Catholic voting
- the disbandment of the B-Specials, an entirely Protestant police reserve, perceived as sectarian.

All of these specific demands were aimed at an ultimate goal that had been the one of women at the very beginning: the end of discrimination.

Civil rights activists all over Northern Ireland soon launched a campaign of civil resistance. There was opposition from Loyalists, who were aided by the Royal Ulster Constabulary (RUC), Northern Ireland's police force. At this point, the RUC was over 90% Protestant. Violence escalated, resulting in the rise of the Provisional Irish Republican Army (IRA) from the Catholic community, a group reminiscent of those from the War of Independence and the Civil War that occurred in the 1920s that had launched a campaign of violence to end British rule in Northern Ireland. Loyalist paramilitaries countered this with a defensive campaign of violence and the British government responded with a policy of internment without trial of suspected IRA members. For more than 300 people, the internment lasted several years. The huge majority of those interned by the British forces were Catholic. In 1978, in a case brought by the government of the Republic of Ireland against the government of the United Kingdom, the European Court of Human Rights ruled that the interrogation techniques approved for use by British interrogators on internees in Northern Ireland amounted to "inhuman and degrading" treatment.

The IRA encouraged Republicans to join in the movement for civil rights but never controlled NICRA. The Northern Ireland Civil Rights Association fought for the end of discrimination toward Catholics and did not take a position on the legitimacy of the state. Republican leader Gerry Adams explained subsequently that Catholics saw that it was possible for them to have their demands heard. He wrote that "we were able to see an example of the fact that you didn't just have to take it, you could fight back". For an account and critique of the movements for civil rights in Northern Ireland, reflecting on the ambiguous link between the causes of civil rights and opposition to the union with the United Kingdom, see the work of Richard English.

One of the most important events in the era of civil rights in Northern Ireland took place in Derry, which escalated the conflict from peaceful civil disobedience to armed conflict. The Battle of the Bogside started on 12 August when an Apprentice Boys, a Protestant order, parade passed through Waterloo Place, where a large crowd was gathered at the mouth of William Street, on the edge of the Bogside. Different accounts describe the first outbreak of violence, with reports stating that it was either an attack by youth from the Bogside on the RUC, or fighting broke out between Protestants and Catholics. The violence escalated and barricades were erected. Proclaiming this district to be the Free Derry, Bogsiders carried on fights with the RUC for days using stones and petrol bombs. The government finally withdrew the RUC and replaced it with the British Army, which disbanded the crowds of Catholics who were barricaded in the Bogside.

Bloody Sunday, 30 January 1972, in Derry is seen by some as a turning point in the movement for civil rights. Fourteen unarmed Catholic civil rights marchers protesting against internment were shot and killed by soldiers from the Parachute Regiment.

The peace process has made significant gains in recent years. Through open dialogue from all parties, a state of ceasefire by all major paramilitary groups has lasted. A stronger economy improved Northern Ireland's standard of living. Civil rights issues have become less of a concern for many in Northern Ireland over the past 20 years as laws and policies protecting their rights, and forms of affirmative action, have been implemented for all government offices and many private businesses. Tensions still exist, but the vast majority of citizens are no longer affected by violence.

== Canada's Quiet Revolution ==
The 1960s brought intense political and social change to the Canadian province of Quebec, with the election of Liberal Premier Jean Lesage after the death of Maurice Duplessis, whose government was widely viewed as corrupt. These changes included secularization of the education and health care systems, which were both heavily controlled by the Roman Catholic Church, whose support for Duplessis and his perceived corruption had angered many Québécois. Policies of the Liberal government also sought to give Quebec more economic autonomy, such as the nationalization of Hydro-Québec and the creation of public companies for the mining, forestry, iron/steel and petroleum industries of the province. Other changes included the creation of the Régie des Rentes du Québec (Quebec Pension Plan) and new labour codes that made unionizing easier and gave workers the right to strike.

The social and economic changes of the Quiet Revolution gave life to the Quebec sovereignty movement, as more and more Québécois saw themselves as a distinctly culturally different from the rest of Canada. The segregationist Parti Québécois was created in 1968 and won the 1976 Quebec general election. They enacted legislation meant to enshrine French as the language of business in the province, while also controversially restricting the usage of English on signs and restricting the eligibility of students to be taught in English.

A radical strand of French Canadian nationalism produced the Front de libération du Québec (FLQ), which since 1963 has been using terrorism to make Quebec a sovereign nation. In October 1970, in response to the arrest of some of its members earlier in the year, the FLQ kidnapped British diplomat James Cross and Quebec's Minister of Labour Pierre Laporte, whom they later killed. The then Canadian Prime Minister Pierre Elliott Trudeau, himself a French Canadian, invoked the War Measures Act, declared martial law in Quebec, and arrested the kidnappers by the end of the year.

== Movements for civil rights in the United States ==
Movements for civil rights in the United States include noted legislation and organized efforts to abolish public and private acts of racial discrimination against African Americans and other disadvantaged groups between 1954 and 1968, particularly in the southern United States. It is sometimes referred to as the Second Reconstruction era, alluding to the unresolved issues of the Reconstruction Era (1863–1877).

=== Ethnicity equity issues ===
==== Integrationism ====
After 1890, the system of Jim Crow, disenfranchisement, and second class citizenship degraded the citizenship rights of African Americans, especially in the South. It was the nadir of American race relations. There were three main aspects: racial segregation – upheld by the United States Supreme Court decision in Plessy v. Ferguson in 1896 –, legally mandated by southern governments—voter suppression or disfranchisement in the southern states, and private acts of violence and mass racial violence aimed at African Americans, unhindered or encouraged by government authorities. Although racial discrimination was present nationwide, the combination of law, public and private acts of discrimination, marginal economic opportunity, and violence directed toward African Americans in the southern states became known as Jim Crow.

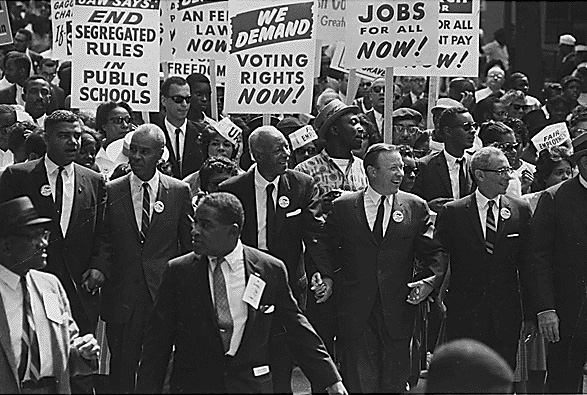
1963 March on Washington for Jobs and Freedom

Noted strategies employed prior to 1955 included litigation and lobbying attempts by the National Association for the Advancement of Colored People (NAACP). These efforts were a hallmark of the early American Civil Rights Movement from 1896 to 1954.

By 1955, blacks became frustrated by gradual approaches to implement desegregation by federal and state governments and the "massive resistance" by whites. The black leadership adopted a combined strategy of direct action with nonviolence, sometimes resulting in nonviolent resistance and civil disobedience. Some of the acts of nonviolence and civil disobedience produced crisis situations between practitioners and government authorities. The authorities of federal, state, and local governments often acted with an immediate response to end the crisis situations – sometimes in the practitioners' favor. Some of the different forms of protests and/or civil disobedience employed included economic boycotts, as successfully practiced by the Montgomery bus boycott (1955–1956) in Alabama which gave the movement one of its more famous icons in Rosa Parks; "sit-ins", as demonstrated by two influential events, the Greensboro sit-in (1960) in North Carolina and the Nashville sit-ins in Nashville, Tennessee; the influential 1963 Birmingham Children's Crusade, in which children were set upon by the local authorities with fire hoses and attack dogs, and longer marches, as exhibited by the Selma to Montgomery marches (1965) in Alabama which at first was resisted and attacked by the state and local authorities, and resulted in the 1965 Voting Rights Act. The evidence of changing attitudes could also be seen around the country, where small businesses sprang up supporting the Civil Rights Movement, such as New Jersey's Everybody's Luncheonette.

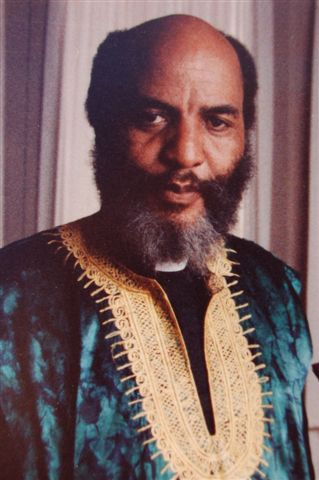
James Bevel initiated and directed the 1963 Birmingham Children's Crusade, 1965 Selma to Montgomery march, and other civil rights movement events of the 1960s.

Besides the Children's Crusade and the Selma to Montgomery marches, another illustrious event of the 1960s Civil Rights Movement was the March on Washington for Jobs and Freedom in August, 1963. It is best remembered for the "I Have a Dream" speech by Martin Luther King Jr. in which the speech turned into a national text and eclipsed the troubles the organizers had to bring to march forward. It had been a fairly complicated affair to bring together various leaders of civil rights, religious and labor groups. As the name of the march implies, many compromises had to be made in order to unite the followers of so many different causes. The "March on Washington for Jobs and Freedom" emphasized the combined purposes of the march and the goals that each of the leaders aimed at. The 1963 March on Washington organizers and organizational leaders, informally named the "Big Six", were A. Philip Randolph, Roy Wilkins, Martin Luther King Jr., Whitney Young, James Farmer and John Lewis. Although they came from different backgrounds and political interests, these organizers and leaders were intent on the peacefulness of the march, which had its own marshal to ensure that the event would be peaceful and respectful of the law. The success of the march is still being debated, but one aspect which has been raised was the misrepresentation of women. A lot of feminine civil rights groups had participated in the organization of the march, but when it came to actual activity women were denied the right to speak and were relegated to figurative roles in the back of the stage. As some female participants noticed, the March can be remembered for the "I Have a Dream" speech but for some female activists it was a new awakening, forcing black women not only to fight for civil rights but also to engage in the Feminist movement.

Noted achievements of the Civil Rights Movement include the judicial victory in the Brown v. Board of Education case that nullified the legal article of "separate but equal" and made segregation legally impermissible, and the passages of the 1964 Civil Rights Act, . that banned discrimination in employment practices and public accommodations, passage of the Voting Rights Act of 1965 that restored voting rights, and passage of the Civil Rights Act of 1968 that banned discrimination in the sale or rental of housing.

==== Black Power movement ====
By 1967 the emergence of the Black Power movement (1966–75) began to gradually eclipse the original "integrated power" aims of the successful Civil Rights Movement that had been espoused by Martin Luther King Jr. and others. Advocates of Black Power argued for black self-determination, and asserted that the assimilation inherent in integration robs Africans of their common heritage and dignity. For example, the theorist and activist Omali Yeshitela argues that Africans have historically fought to protect their lands, cultures, and freedoms from European colonialists, and that any integration into the society which has stolen another people and their wealth is an act of treason.

Today, most Black Power advocates have not changed their self-sufficiency argument. Racism still exists worldwide, and some believe that blacks in the United States, on the whole, did not assimilate into U.S. "mainstream" culture. Blacks arguably became even more oppressed, this time partially by "their own" people in a new black stratum of the middle class and the ruling class. Black Power's advocates generally argue that the reason for this stalemate and further oppression of the vast majority of U.S. blacks is because Black Power's objectives have not had the opportunity to be fully carried through.

One of the most public manifestations of the Black Power movement took place in the 1968 Olympics, when two African-Americans, Tommie Smith and John Carlos, stood on the podium doing a Black Power salute. This act is still remembered today as the 1968 Olympics Black Power salute.

==== Chicano Movement ====
The Chicano Movement occurred during the civil rights era that sought political empowerment and social inclusion for Mexican-Americans around a generally nationalist argument. The Chicano movement blossomed in the 1960s and was active through the late 1970s in various regions of the U.S. The movement had roots in the civil rights struggles that had preceded it, adding to it the cultural and generational politics of the era.

The early heroes of the movement—Rodolfo Gonzales in Denver and Reies Tijerina in New Mexico—adopted a historical account of the preceding hundred and twenty-five years that had obscured much of Mexican-American history. Gonzales and Tijerina embraced a nationalism that identified the failure of the United States government to live up to its promises in the Treaty of Guadalupe Hidalgo. In that account, Mexican Americans were a conquered people who simply needed to reclaim their birthright and cultural heritage as part of a new nation, which later became known as Aztlán.

That version of the past did not, but take into account the history of those Mexicans who had immigrated to the United States. It also gave little attention to the rights of undocumented immigrants in the United States in the 1960s— which is not surprising, since immigration did not have the political significance it later acquired. It was a decade later when activists, such as Bert Corona in California, embraced the rights of undocumented workers and helped broaden the movement to include their issues.

When the movement dealt with practical problems in the 1960s, most activists focused on the most immediate issues confronting Mexican Americans; unequal educational and employment opportunities, political disfranchisement, and police brutality. In the heady days of the late 1960s, when the student movement was active around the globe, the Chicano movement brought about more or less spontaneous actions, such as the mass walkouts by high school students in Denver and East Los Angeles in 1968 and the Chicano Moratorium in Los Angeles in 1970.

The movement was particularly strong at the college level, where activists formed MEChA, Movimiento Estudiantil Chicano de Aztlán, which promoted Chicano Studies programs and a generalized ethno-nationalist agenda.

==== American Indian Movement ====
At a time when peaceful sit-ins were a common protest tactic, the American Indian Movement (AIM) takeovers in their early days were noticeably violent. Some appeared to be spontaneous outcomes of protest gatherings, but others included armed seizure of public facilities.

The Alcatraz Island occupation of 1969, although commonly associated with NAM, pre-dated the organization, but was a catalyst for its formation.

In 1970, AIM occupied abandoned property at the Naval Air Station near Minneapolis. In July 1971, it assisted in a takeover of the Winter Dam, Lac Courte Oreilles, and Wisconsin. When activists took over the Bureau of Indian Affairs Headquarters in Washington, D.C. in November 1972, they sacked the building and 24 people were arrested. Activists occupied the Custer County Courthouse in 1973, though police routed the occupation after a riot took place.

In 1973 activists and military forces confronted each other in the Wounded Knee incident. The standoff lasted 71 days, and two men died in the violence.

=== Gender equity issues ===
If the period associated with first-wave feminism focused upon absolute rights such as suffrage (which led to women attaining the right to vote in the early part of the 20th century), the period of the second-wave feminism was concerned with the issues such as changing social attitudes and economic, reproductive, and educational equality (including the ability to have careers in addition to motherhood, or the right to choose not to have children) between the genders and addressed the rights of female minorities. The new feminist movement, which spanned from 1963 to 1982, explored economic equality, political power at all levels, professional equality, reproductive freedoms, issues with the family, educational equality, sexuality, and many other issues.

== LGBT rights and gay liberation ==
Since the mid-19th century in Germany, social reformers have used the language of civil rights to argue against the oppression of same-sex sexuality, same-sex emotional intimacy, and gender variance. Largely, but not exclusively, these LGBT movements have characterized gender variant and homosexually oriented people as a minority group(s); this was the approach taken by the homophile movement of the 1940s, 1950s and early 1960s. With the rise of secularism in the West, an increasing sexual openness, women's liberation, the 1960s counterculture, the AIDS epidemic, and a range of new social movements, the homophile movement underwent a rapid growth and transformation, with a focus on building community and unapologetic activism which came to be known as the Gay Liberation.

The words "Gay Liberation" echoed "Women's Liberation"; the Gay Liberation Front consciously took its name from the "National Liberation Fronts" of Vietnam and Algeria, and the slogan "Gay Power", as a defiant answer to the rights-oriented homophile movement, was inspired by Black Power and Chicano Power. The GLF's statement of purpose explained:

We are a revolutionary group of men and women formed with the realization that complete sexual liberation for all people cannot come about unless existing social institutions are abolished. We reject society's attempt to impose sexual roles and definitions of our nature.

— GLF statement of purpose

GLF activist Martha Shelley wrote,

We are women and men who, from the time of our earliest memories, have been in revolt against the sex-role structure and nuclear family structure.

— "Gay is Good", Martha Shelley, 1970

Gay Liberationists aimed at transforming fundamental concepts and institutions of society, such as gender and the family. In order to achieve such liberation, consciousness raising and direct action were employed. Specifically, the word 'gay' was preferred to previous designations such as homosexual or homophile; some saw 'gay' as a rejection of the false dichotomy heterosexual/homosexual. Lesbians and gays were urged to "come out" and publicly reveal their sexuality to family, friends and colleagues as a form of activism, and to counter shame with gay pride. "Gay Lib" groups were formed in Australia, New Zealand, Germany, France, the UK, the US, Italy and elsewhere. The lesbian group Lavender Menace was also formed in the U.S. in response to both the male domination of other Gay Lib groups and the anti-lesbian sentiment in the Women's Movement. Lesbianism was advocated as a feminist choice for women, and the first currents of lesbian separatism began to emerge.

By the late 1970s, the radicalism of Gay Liberation was eclipsed by a return to a more formal movement that became known as the Gay and Lesbian Rights Movement.

== Soviet Union ==
In the 1960s, the early years of the Brezhnev stagnation, dissidents in the Soviet Union increasingly turned their attention civil and eventually human rights concerns. The fight for civil and human rights focused on issues of freedom of expression, freedom of conscience, freedom to emigrate, punitive psychiatry, and the plight of political prisoners. It was characterized by a new openness of dissent, a concern for legality, the rejection of any 'underground' and violent struggle. It played a significant role in providing a common language and goal for many Soviet dissidents, and became a cause for diverse social groups in the dissident milieu, ranging from activists in the youth subculture to academics such as Andrei Sakhrarov.

Significantly, Soviet dissidents of the 1960s introduced the "legalist" approach of avoiding moral and political commentary in favor of close attention to legal and procedural issues. Following several landmark trials of writers (Sinyavsky-Daniel trial, the trials of Alexander Ginzburg and Yuri Galanskov) and an associated crackdown on dissidents by the KGB, coverage of arrests and trials in samizdat (unsanctioned press) became more common. This activity eventually led to the founding of the Chronicle of Current Events in April 1968. The unofficial newsletter reported violations of civil rights and judicial procedure by the Soviet government and responses to those violations by citizens across the USSR.

Throughout the 1960s–1980s, dissidents in the civil and human rights movement engaged in a variety of activities: The documentation of political repression and rights violations in samizdat (unsanctioned press); individual and collective protest letters and petitions; unsanctioned demonstrations; an informal network of mutual aid for prisoners of conscience; and, most prominently, civic watch groups appealing to the international community. All of these activities came at great personal risk and with repercussions ranging from dismissal from work and studies to many years of imprisonment in labor camps and being subjected to punitive psychiatry.

The rights-based strategy of dissent merged with the idea of human rights. The human rights movement included figures such as Valery Chalidze, Yuri Orlov, and Lyudmila Alexeyeva. Special groups were founded such as the Initiative Group for the Defense of Human Rights in the USSR (1969) and the Committee on Human Rights in the USSR (1970). Though faced with the loss of many members to prisons, labor camps, psychiatric institutions and exile, they documented abuses, wrote appeals to international human rights bodies, collected signatures for petitions, and attended trials.

The signing of the Helsinki Accords (1975) containing human rights clauses provided civil rights campaigners with a new hope to use international instruments. This led to the creation of dedicated Helsinki Watch Groups in Moscow (Moscow Helsinki Group), Kiev (Ukrainian Helsinki Group), Vilnius (Lithuanian Helsinki Group), Tbilisi, and Erevan (1976–77).

== Prague Spring ==
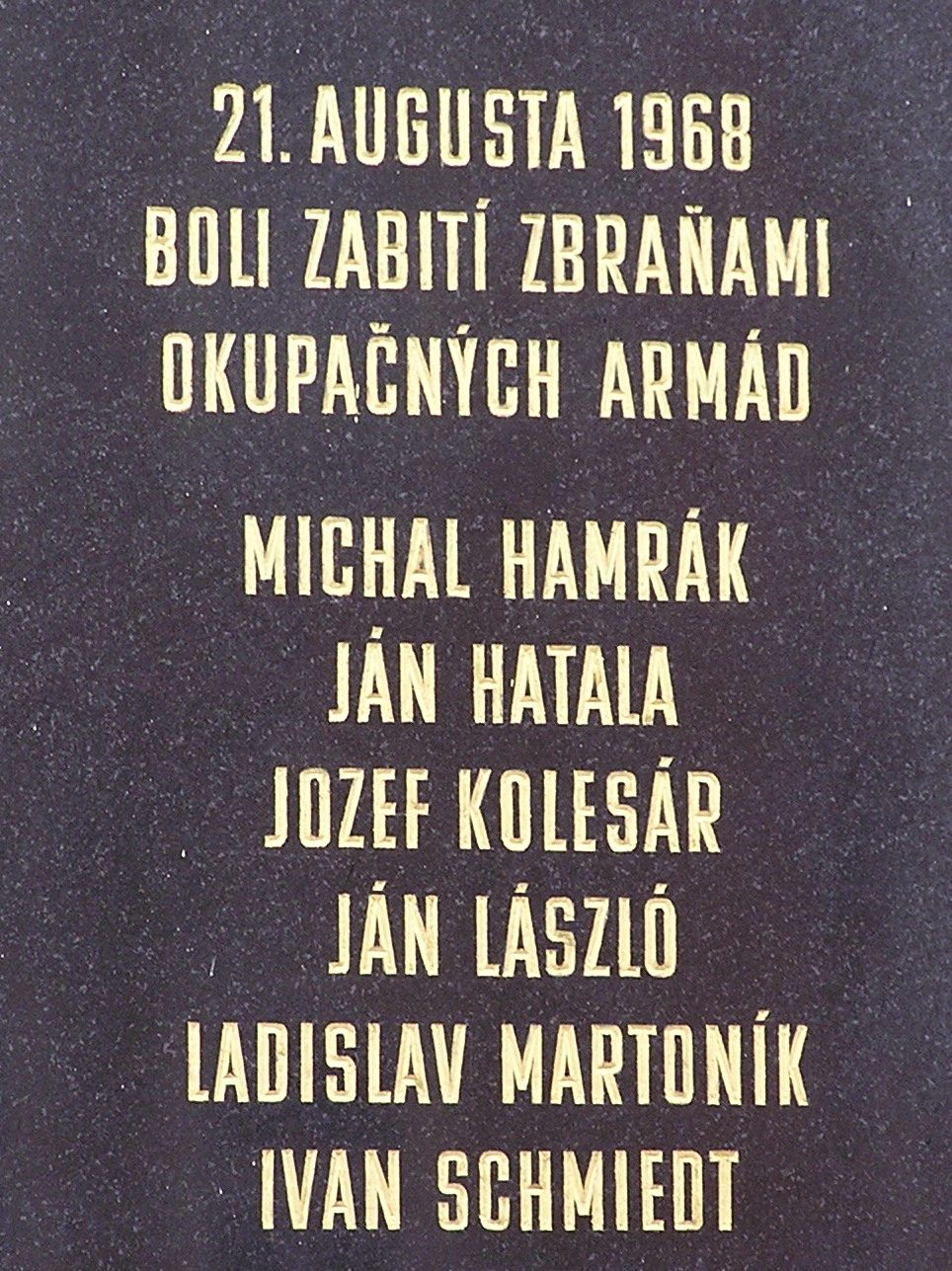
Prague Spring memorial plate in Košice, Slovakia

The Prague Spring (Czech: Pražské jaro, Slovak: Pražská jar, Russian: пражская весна) was a period of political liberalization in Czechoslovakia starting on January 5, 1968, and running until August 20 of that year, when the Soviet Union and its Warsaw Pact allies (except for Romania) invaded the country.

During World War II, Czechoslovakia fell into the Soviet sphere of influence, the Eastern Bloc. Since 1948 there were no parties other than the Communist Party in the country and it was indirectly managed by the Soviet Union. Unlike other countries of Central and Eastern Europe, the communist take-over in Czechoslovakia in 1948 was, although as brutal as elsewhere, a genuine popular movement. Reform in the country did not lead to the convulsions seen in Hungary.

Towards the end of World War II Joseph Stalin wanted Czechoslovakia, and signed an agreement with Winston Churchill and Franklin D. Roosevelt that Prague would be liberated by the Red Army, despite the fact that the United States Army under General George S. Patton could have liberated the city earlier. This was important for the spread of pro-Russian (and pro-communist) propaganda that came right after the war. People still remembered what they felt as Czechoslovakia's betrayal by the West at the Munich Agreement. For these reasons, the people voted for communists in the 1948 elections, the last democratic poll to take place there for a long time.

From the middle of the 1960s, Czechs and Slovaks showed increasing signs of rejection of the existing regime. This change was reflected by reformist elements within the communist party by installing Alexander Dubček as party leader. Dubček's reforms of the political process inside Czechoslovakia, which he referred to as Socialism with a human face, did not represent a complete overthrow of the old regime, as was the case in Hungary in 1956. Dubček's changes had broad support from the society, including the working class, but was seen by the Soviet leadership as a threat to their hegemony over other states of the Eastern Bloc and to the very safety of the Soviet Union. Czechoslovakia was in the middle of the defensive line of the Warsaw Pact and its possible defection to the enemy was unacceptable during the Cold War.

However, a sizeable minority in the ruling party, especially at higher leadership levels, was opposed to any lessening of the party's grip on society and actively plotted with the leadership of the Soviet Union to overthrow the reformers. This group watched in horror as calls for multi-party elections and other reforms began echoing throughout the country.

Between the nights of August 20 and August 21, 1968, Eastern Bloc armies from five Warsaw Pact countries invaded Czechoslovakia. During the invasion, Soviet tanks ranging in numbers from 5,000 to 7,000 occupied the streets. They were followed by a large number of Warsaw Pact troops ranging from 200,000 to 600,000.

The Soviets insisted that they had been invited to invade the country, stating that loyal Czechoslovak Communists had told them that they were in need of "fraternal assistance against the counter-revolution". A letter which was found in 1989 proved an invitation to invade did indeed exist. During the attack of the Warsaw Pact armies, 72 Czechs and Slovaks were killed (19 of those in Slovakia) and hundreds were wounded (up to September 3, 1968). Alexander Dubček called upon his people not to resist. He was arrested and taken to Moscow, along with several of his colleagues.

== Movement for civil rights for Indigenous Australians ==
Australia was settled by the British without a treaty or recognition of the Indigenous population, consisting of Aboriginal Australian and Torres Strait Islander peoples. There were constraints on voting rights in some states until as late as 1965 (Queensland), and land rights were hard fought for, with the granting of native title in Australia only coming into force federally in 1993. Cultural assimilation by forcible removal of Aboriginal children from their families took place until late in the 20th century. Like other international civil rights movements, the push for progress has involved protests (See Freedom Ride (Australia) and Aboriginal Tent Embassy) and seen riots in response to social injustice, such as the 2004 Redfern riots and Palm Island riot.

While there has been significant progress in redressing discriminatory laws, Indigenous Australians continue to be at a disadvantage compared to their non-Indigenous counterparts, on key measures such as: life expectancy; infant mortality; health; imprisonment; and levels of education and employment. An ongoing government strategy called Closing the Gap is in place in an attempt to remedy this.

== See also ==
- Civil and political rights
- Protests of 1968
- Timeline of the civil rights movement
