= Moy Park =

Northern Irish food company

- Company type: Private
- Industry: Food processing
- Headquarters: Craigavon, Northern Ireland
- Area served: Europe
- Key people: Chris Kirke
- Products: Food
- Parent: Pilgrim's Pride
- Website: www.moypark.com

Moy Park is a Northern Ireland based poultry meat producer, the largest meat producer in Northern Ireland, with operations in the Republic of Ireland, France, Great Britain and the Netherlands.

One of the 15 biggest food companies in the United Kingdom, Moy Park is the largest employer in Northern Ireland, with 6,300 employees, 5,400 in Great Britain, 800 in France, 100 in the Netherlands and around 50 in the Republic of Ireland.

== History ==
The company was founded in 1943 in the village of Moygashel near Dungannon; it continues to have a factory in Dungannon.

In September 2015, the company was sold by one Brazilian food processing company, Marfrig, to another, JBS S.A., for almost £1 billion.

A £20 million investment in Moy Park's Dungannon facility was announced in late 2015, to increase production to 2.3 million birds per week. In March 2016, the company announced it would be investing £4 million at its Seagoe site in Craigavon to increase production of cooked chicken.

Prior to the 2016 referendum on the UK's membership of the EU, the company's Chief Executive, Janet McCollum, said that the UK should remain within the European Union. The company has used the freedom of movement within the EU to employ over 1,000 workers from countries such as Lithuania, Poland and Portugal at its Northern Ireland facilities. After the UK voted to leave the EU, the company announced that it planned to move its headquarters to the Republic of Ireland.

In September 2017, JBS sold Moy Park to Pilgrim's Pride for £1 billion; JBS owns 79% of Pilgrim's Pride.

== Products ==
The company supplies supermarkets including Asda, Sainsbury's, Tesco and Ocado, and fast food restaurants such as McDonald's and Burger King. Brands include:

- Moy Park Chicken
- O'Kane (breaded and ready-to-eat products)
- Castle Lea (ready-to-eat products)
- Moy Park Foodservice (frozen poultry)
- Kitchen Range Foods (frozen desserts, meat-free and gluten-free foods)
- Albert Van Zoonen (snack products)
- Orléans (meat processing)
- McLarnon Feeds (animal feeds)

== Animal Abuse ==
Moy Park has received media attention for the poor conditions in its farms.

In June 2019, Animal Equality UK stated that after visiting three Moy Park farms in Lincolnshire on multiple occasions between February and April 2019, they had filmed evidence of "extreme suffering". The charity said carcasses were "left to rot for days", and birds were found with severe leg injuries, with some unable to stand.

In March 2021, Dispatches (TV programme) went undercover at the same site Animal Equality UK investigated 2 years earlier. They found birds with "horrific injuries" and guidance issued to kill chicks deemed "lame" or "too small". Over 4000 chicks died or were culled during the 11 days of filming and farm managers seemed unaware of Red Tractor guidelines regarding investigating excessive deaths.

In April 2022 activists shot undercover footage inside of a chicken farm operated by Moy Park. The location had been used as a paid promotion for KFC months earlier. Conditions were vastly different than previously pictured with many instances of "severe overcrowding and dead birds".

In August 2022, industry whistle-blowers claimed factory farm chickens had "died slowly of heat exhaustion" after inadequate ventilation and cooling during the 2022 United Kingdom heat wave. Moy Park was listed as one of the companies involved. The Department for Environment, Food and Rural Affairs said it was "deeply concerned" about the issue and that the sheer scale of the mortalities had prompted an investigation by officials.
