= Northern Ireland civil rights movement =

Political movement in Northern Ireland

- Part of the civil rights movements and Protests of 1968
- Date: 1967 – 1972
- Location: Northern Ireland
- Goals: Civil and political rights

The Northern Ireland civil rights movement dates to the early 1960s, when a number of initiatives emerged in Northern Ireland which challenged the inequality and discrimination against ethnic Irish Catholics that was perpetrated by the Ulster Protestant establishment (composed largely of Protestant Ulster loyalists and unionists). The Campaign for Social Justice (CSJ) was founded by Conn McCluskey and his wife, Patricia. Conn was a doctor, and Patricia was a social worker who had worked in Glasgow for a period, and who had a background in housing activism. Both were involved in the Homeless Citizens League, an organisation founded after Catholic women occupied disused social housing. The HCL evolved into the CSJ, focusing on lobbying, research and publicising discrimination. The campaign for Derry University was another mid-1960s campaign.

The most important organisation established during this period was the Northern Ireland Civil Rights Association (NICRA), established in 1967 to protest discrimination. NICRA's objectives were:

1. To defend the basic freedoms of all citizens
2. To protect the rights of the individual
3. To highlight abuses of power
4. To demand guarantees for freedom of speech, assembly and association
5. To inform the public of its lawful rights

== Background ==
The Parliament of Northern Ireland did not follow Westminster in changes to the franchise from 1945 - One man, one vote. As a result, into the late 1960s, plural voting was still allowed not only for local government (as it was for local government in Great Britain), but also for the Parliament of Northern Ireland. This meant that in local council elections (as in Great Britain), ratepayers and their spouses, whether renting or owning the property, could vote. Company directors had an extra vote by virtue of their company's status. However, unlike the situation in Great Britain, non-ratepayers did not have a vote in local government elections.

The property franchise (which granted votes in local elections only to those who owned property) weighted representation heavily in favour of the Protestant community, as did the plural business votes they enjoyed for parliamentary elections. The result was that many towns and cities with a Catholic majority, even a substantial one, were Unionist-controlled: examples included Derry, Armagh, Dungannon, and Enniskillen.

NICRA was formed on 29 January 1967; it was predominantly made up of individuals outside the republican movement.

During its first two years NICRA wrote letters, petitioned and lobbied; it was "a period of general ineffectuality". In the summer of 1968 NICRA "somewhat hesitantly" agreed to hold its first protest march from Coalisland to Dungannon, on 24 August. The march was publicised as a "civil rights march", and the organisers emphasised its non-sectarian dimension. Bernadette Devlin (who became a civil rights activist) described a festival atmosphere which turned "uglier" when the police stopped the march from entering Dungannon, where a counter-demonstration had been called by the Paisleyites. The NICRA organisers announced that they would not breach the police cordon. However, as Devlin recalls, they began to "lose their hold on the marchers". According to Devlin, many of the initial organisers soon left after efforts to wind down the movement failed; those who remained "sat down in big circles all over the road and sang rebel songs till midnight".

== Derry, 5 October 1968 ==
The second civil-rights march was proposed by activists on the Derry Housing Action Committee (DHAC). DHAC, founded in early 1968, campaigned against discrimination in housing and the shortage of social housing in Derry, one of Northern Ireland's most depressed towns. A sample of DHAC tactics is revealed in the case of John Wilson, related by Fionbarra O'Dochartaigh (a leading member of the DHAC) in his book Ulster's White Negros. Wilson (a Catholic) lived with his family in a caravan, but was told he was unlikely to obtain social housing. On 22 June 1968 DHAC put his caravan in the middle of a main road, blocking traffic for 24 hours; the following weekend, it blocked traffic for 48 hours. After this, it planned to block the city centre when the Wilsons were provided housing. Eamonn McCann, another key member of the DHAC, described this as an important victory: "It had been made very publicly clear that outrageous tactics worked, that blocking roads worked better than a MP's intervention…"

NICRA accepted the Derry activists' march, planned for 5 October 1968 in Derry. However, the march was banned by Minister for Home Affairs William Craig and NICRA wanted to withdraw. The march route included the city centre, a bastion of Protestantism and out-of-bounds for Catholic public events. The DHAC said they would go ahead, forcing NICRA to agree or be seen to capitulate.

Derry is a dead city: about one in five of the men is unemployed and the whole feeling is depressed. But it was electric that day. You could see it on people's faces - excitement, or alarm, or anger. Derry was alive.

— Bernadette Devlin

The march was characterised by non-sectarian civil-rights demands, including an end to gerrymandering and discrimination in housing and the right to vote. The Royal Ulster Constabulary attempted to violently disperse the crowd. When the RUC attacked, Betty Sinclair asked the crowd to disperse. However, chaos erupted as the protesters found themselves trapped between two lines of the RUC. The police drove the protesters across the river into the Catholic area of the Bogside: "By this time the original confrontation between marchers and the police had given way to a general battle between the police and young residents of the Bogside, most of whom had taken no part in the march".

The birthdate of the civil-rights movement is considered to be 5 October; images of police brutality were broadcast worldwide, and much of Northern Ireland's population was horrified. In Derry, the period following 5 October was one in which established political forces and prominent individuals in Catholic areas tried to harness and control the movement's energy.

After the 5 October march the DHAC radicals scheduled another march on the same route for the following week. At this point, Derry moderates emerged and announced a meeting attended by "local professionals, business people, trade unionists and clergy" from the Catholic community. This led to the formation of the Derry Citizens Action Committee (DCAC), which effectively (if temporarily) assumed leadership of the movement. The DHAC, afraid of losing influence, joined the DCAC—except for Eamonn McCann, who denounced them as "middle class, middle aged and middle of the road".

The DCAC fought for civil rights with non-violent civil disobedience and direct action, now with a mainstream leadership careful to provide leadership at each action to prevent confrontations with the police. DCAC continued its push for non-sectarian demands. Its first action, a mass sit-down in Derry's Guildhall Square (home of the Derry Corporation), focused on housing and the following demands:

- Crash house-building programme
- A points system for housing allocation
- Legal control over renting furnished accommodations

The DCAC organised a series of actions, many of which defied Craig's ban on protests and demonstrated "its ability to mount a peaceful protest and maintain discipline over its followers". The movement was growing, and many of its demands seemed achievable. However, "the committee's rank-and-file supporters were becoming increasingly militant". All demonstrations in Derry were banned on 18 November, which was an initial peak in civil-rights activity (much of which was independent of the DCAC). That day, protesters who had been arrested at the 5 October march were being prosecuted. After their trial they were carried down to Guildhall Square by a large crowd of supporters, where they were attacked by the police. Thirty minutes later, about 400 dock workers left work in protest against the attacks and marched through the city centre. The DCAC had earlier cancelled a planned strike of shirt-factory workers, "but at about 3pm one thousand workers, mostly young women from some half dozen factories, left work and marched up Strand Road, through Guildhall Square…to the Diamond".

Days later, Prime Minister Terence O'Neill began to concede to the movement's demands. On 22 November O'Neill announced the dissolution of Derry Corporation, the end of the company director's vote, and a points system to end housing discrimination. O'Neill made a television address appealing to the civil-rights movement to "give him time" to introduce reforms. Consequently, the DCAC called a truce and announced that it would not organise any more marches for one month.

== People's Democracy ==
In Belfast the situation was different since students at Queen's University (QUB) were at the centre of events. Bernadette Devlin, leader of the People's Democracy (PD) and a foremost figure in the civil-rights movement, described her return to QUB after the Derry march:

I went up to Belfast thinking I had changed, and I found that everyone had. The atmosphere at Queen's was joltingly different. The silence barrier was down. Derry was being talked about in the lecture rooms, in the tutorial rooms, in the snackbar at dinner, in the cloakrooms, in the showers, in the bar…People were talking and thinking about the society they were living in - not as an intellectual exercise, but enthusiastically and emotionally and as if it mattered.

On 9 October, Devlin and others organised a protest march to Belfast City Hall against police brutality: "2,000 people turned up spontaneously. All the complacent attitudes were gone". After this protest, the students returned to campus and held a meeting at which the PD was formed with six demands: one man, one vote; a fair drawing of electoral boundaries; freedom of speech and assembly; repeal of the Special Powers Act; and a fair allocation of jobs and social housing. "One man, one vote" would become a central demand of the movement. The PD would become a leading force within the movement between late 1968 and the first part of 1969; it was committed to street politics and staunchly anti-sectarian.

The PD was organised through a democratic mass assembly. Michael Farrell, the most influential figure in the PD, has said that they were influenced by the radical democratic practices of the Sorbonne Assembly. The PD elected a "Faceless Committee" to execute decisions made by the assembly. While there was no formal membership, Devlin remembers up to 700 people attending their mass assemblies. PD actions in late 1968 included protests, open-air meetings, sit-downs and the occupation of the Northern Ireland Parliament on 24 October.

In January 1969, the PD organised a "Long March" from Belfast to Derry modelled on the civil-rights march to Montgomery, Alabama. This was during the "truce", which NICRA and DCAC were maintaining. The march was criticised as "reckless", with the DCAC and NICRA opposing it. The purpose of the march was described by one activist as "pushing a structure…towards a point where its internal proceedings would cause a snapping and breaking to begin", while Devlin described it as an attempt to "pull the carpet off the floor to show the dirt that was underneath".

The march was attacked repeatedly along the way, but as it developed it drew more supporters and participants. By marching through "Protestant territory" (where it was repeatedly blocked and threatened), the Long March exposed Northern Irish sectarianism and the unwillingness of police to defend the right to protest.

As they neared Derry, at Burntollet Bridge, the marchers were ambushed by loyalists and members of the RUC. Eighty-seven activists were hospitalised. When the marchers reached Derry, the city exploded in riots. Following a night of rioting, RUC men entered the Bogside (a Catholic ghetto), wrecked a number of houses and attacked several people. This led to a new development: Bogside residents, with the consent of the DCAC, set up "vigilante" groups to defend the area. Barricades were put up and manned by the locals for five days. It also created a context in which older Republican veterans could emerge as prominent figures within the movement; for example, Sean Keenan (later important to the Derry Provisional IRA) was involved in pushing for defensive patrols and barricades.

The first half of 1969 continued to be characterised by protests and direct action. The PD had joined NICRA en masse and succeeded in radicalising the organisation, with a number of PD members gaining seats on the executive board. NICRA organised marches and demonstrations throughout Northern Ireland, and the DCAC called off its truce and began organising marches again. The government introduced more-repressive legislation (specifically banning civil-disobedience tactics such as sit-ins), which gave the movement something else to resist. In April there were more serious riots in Derry, and the barricades went up again for a brief period. Meanwhile, direct action around concrete issues continued; according to Devlin, in the first half of 1969 the activists around Eamonn McCann "housed more families [via squatting] than all the respectable housing bodies in Derry put together".

In mid-1969 Prime Minister Terence O'Neill resigned and was replaced by James Chichester-Clark, who announced the introduction of "one man, one vote"; the civil-rights movement had achieved its key demand. However, additional demands concerned police violence and state repression. Two of the most prominent issues were the Special Powers Act, which gave nearly-indiscriminate power to the state (including internment without trial) and the B-Specials, a part-time auxiliary police force seen as sectarian and made up exclusively of Protestants.

== Battle of the Bogside ==
The next development during this period was the "Battle of the Bogside", in which confrontation with the police would reach a peak in Derry's most militant Catholic ghetto. The first half of 1969 was an intense period of political conflict, of which Derry was the epicentre. On 12 August an Apprentice Boys of Derry parade was scheduled to take place in Derry; it would pass near the Bogside area, spawning fears it would erupt into a sectarian bloodbath. Activists in Derry made provisions to limit this possibility by building barricades along the route and providing stewards. Activist Eamonn McCann worried about sectarian conflict usurping the civil-rights emphasis of the movement. In a leaflet he circulated shortly before the event, McCann notes that despite the civil-rights movement's non-sectarian intentions:

In Derry we have finished up participating in the "Defence Association" locking ourselves inside the Catholic area. Probably it is necessary. One must make some attempt to avoid a Catholic versus Protestant fight. And in the situation in which we find ourselves there seems to be no other way of doing it…But that doesn't mean that we like it".

The Defence Association cited by McCann was the Derry Citizens' Defence Association, set up before 12 August and largely promoted by Irish republicans. During the next few months the DCDA became the dominant organisation in Derry, displacing the DCAC.

On 12 August, confrontation erupted. Some have argued that the Bogsiders were provoked by loyalists, while others suggest that Catholic youths stoned the Apprentice Boys. Riots soon began, and the RUC clubbed the Bogsiders. The barricades went up but the RUC were determined to take them down, despite the probability of a huge confrontation. After an initial retreat, the Bogsiders began to force the RUC back. The DCDA had prepared well; the barricades were effective, and rocks and petrol bombs had been prepared. What followed was a 50-hour confrontation, in which the entire population of the Bogside was mobilised: women and children made and distributed petrol bombs while others, stationed on tower block roofs, kept the police at bay with them. Exhausted, the RUC withdrew but the government called in the B-Specials to take over the fight. As they prepared to enter, Westminster decided to deploy the British Army. British troops moved in between the barricades and the RUC, preventing any further conflict without interfering with the barricades.

During the three-day Battle of the Bogside, the civil-rights movement became a localised insurrection against the state. When the RUC retreated and the British Army respected the barricades, there was a sense of victory among NICRA members. Bernadette Devlin (who took part) recalled:

We reached then a turning point in Irish history, and we reached it because of the determination of one group of people in a Catholic slum area in Derry. In fifty hours we brought a government to its knees, and we gave back to a downtrodden people their pride and the strength of their convictions."

During the following month, "Free Derry" (as it became known) "was surrounded by barricades... and was administered by the DCDA, in constant negotiation with local British Army commanders. In the process, the DCDA displaced the political authority of the local MP, John Hume, and of all the political parties".

The DCDA had forty-four members (including nine older republicans) who would later become members of the Provisional Irish Republican Army; younger, radical-leftist republicans; Northern Irish Labour Party activists; the Young Socialist Alliance; tenants' associations and moderate activists who followed John Hume. The Bogsiders declared that the barricades would come down under the following conditions: the abolition of Stormont; abolition of the B-Specials; abolition of the Special Powers Act and the disarming of the RUC.

In early August 1969, RUC and loyalist paramilitaries attacked Catholic areas in west Belfast; barricades were erected, behind which "Free Belfast" was born. As in Derry, the Belfast experiment was organised internally by a Citizens Defence Committee. The demands launched from the barricades echoed those of Derry: disband the B-Specials; disarm the RUC and amnesty for internees. Free Belfast shared many characteristics of its Derry counterpart, although republicans had a stronger influence. The establishment of "free" areas in Belfast and Derry was, in many ways, the final phase of the civil-rights movement. The deployment of British troops to Northern Ireland and the related increase in IRA activities were key factors.

The concluding events of the civil-rights movement were complex. The relationship between the British Army and the Catholic population deteriorated quickly, and confrontations became more frequent. Civil disobedience and street politics became increasingly unstable. Many activists were imprisoned based on false testimony, and the army announced it would shoot rioters. Loyalist paramilitaries became increasingly active, planting a number of bombs in 1969 and blaming them on the IRA. The situation was becoming militarised; in this context, the IRA could assume a leading role.

Near the end of 1969, there was change within the IRA itself. Many older "traditionalists" had again become active, advocating military action to defend Catholic areas (a strategy resisted by the left-leaning leadership, who favoured social and political agitation over military action). At the end of 1969 the IRA divided, and the Provisional IRA emerged. In early 1970 it undertook its first actions (including the armed defence of St. Mathew's church in the Short Strand, which loyalists were attempting to burn). Between 1970 and 1972 the Provisional IRA became more active in rioting and targeting British soldiers. In 1971, internment without trial was introduced. In response, NICRA (which, due to the emergence of the Provisional IRA and the PD's drift towards socialist-party politics, was the main organisation advocating civil rights) organised a campaign of non-payment of rates and rent, in which an estimated 30,000 households participated. Despite such attempts to continue civil disobedience, the civil-rights movement floundered during 1971 and 1972. On 30 January 1972, soldiers from 1 PARA shot into a peaceful civil rights demonstration, killing 14 civilians in what became known as "Bloody Sunday". NICRA organised a protest in response, in which over 100,000 people took part. This was, however, to be the organisation's last significant march; Bloody Sunday had "immobilised [the] NICRA from returning to the streets". As clashes escalated, Westminster suspended the Northern Irish Parliament. This marked the end of the civil-rights movement and street politics. The Provisional IRA emerged as the dominant force within the movement, and Irish nationalism became the foremost political position for those seeking radical social change.
