= Dixie Paumier Clement =

Australian physician and obstetrician (1879–1935)

- Born: 23 December 1879; Dungannon, Tyrone, Ireland
- Died: 25 July 1935
- Occupation: goldminer obstetrician/gynaecologist physician
- Children: 6
- Father: Mildmay Thomas Charlton Clement

Dixie Paumier Clement (23 December 1879 – 25 July 1935) was an Irish-born Australian physician and obstetrician.

== Early life and education ==
Dixie Clement was born on December 23, 1879, in Dungannon, County Tyrone, Ireland. After attending St Faughnan's College in Rosscarbery, County Cork, until 1895, he moved with his family to Western Australia. In Western Australia, Clement joined a prospecting team that discovered the Lancefield mine in Laverton. He worked there until 1902, when he returned to Perth to pursue his matriculation. The following year, he enrolled at Trinity College Dublin, where several other members of his family had also studied. At Trinity College, Clement focused on obstetrics and later completed his studies at the Rotunda Hospital in Dublin, qualifying as a Licentiate of Midwifery in 1908.

== Career ==
Clement immigrated to Australia from Ireland in 1895. Upon arrival, he swiftly secured a position in prospecting and became a member of the team that discovered the Lancefield mine in Laverton.

Following his graduation in 1908, Clement established a private practice alongside Dr. Athelstan Saw. Notably, Clement played a role in advocating for the enhancement of childbirth facilities and midwifery training in Western Australia, ultimately leading to the establishment of the esteemed King Edward Memorial Hospital for Women.

Clement held honorary positions at various other hospitals, including the Perth Hospital, Home of the Good Shepherd, and St Brigid's Convent. He also served as the honorary secretary of the council of the Western Australian branch of the British Medical Association for a duration of four years, and subsequently served as its president for one year.
