= McAlevey =

McAlevey is a surname. Notable people with the surname include:

- Jane McAlevey (1964–2024), American labor unionist
- Lynn McAlevey (born 1953), New Zealand cricketer
- Thomas McAlevey (born 1958), American chief executive

== See also ==
- McAlevey Gold Cup, a former greyhound racing competition held in Belfast, Northern Ireland
