= Timorese in Northern Ireland =

Total population
- Born in East Timor; 2,874 (2021 census)

Regions with significant populations
- Dungannon, Portadown, Lurgan, Cookstown, some in Belfast

Languages
- Tetun, Portuguese, English

Religion
- Primarily Christianity (Roman Catholicism and other)

Related ethnic groups
- East Timorese people

Timorese in Northern Ireland are a recent group of immigrants who primarily live around the towns of Dungannon and Portadown. The first Timorese migrants who moved to Northern Ireland arrived in the late 1990s after being hired through a Northern Irish recruitment agency at recruitment fairs in Portugal. The 2011 Northern Ireland census recorded 894 residents born in East Timor. A 2014 newspaper article estimated their population to be "several thousand".

== Livelihoods ==
Most ethnic Timorese in Northern Ireland primarily work as butchers working for companies such as Moy Park and Dungannon Meats.

== Targets of violence ==
As they are mostly Catholic, the East Timorese community and other immigrants have occasionally been attacked by Ulster loyalists, including in 2011 when violence in Portadown caused hundreds of Timorese residents to flee. There have also been reports of other immigrants and ethnic Timorese residents clashing.

== Relationships with other immigrants ==
Dungannon has a population of many other Portuguese speaking immigrants, especially from Portugal, Brazil, and Mozambique. Many of the Portuguese-speaking residents celebrated together after Portugal's triumph in the UEFA Euro 2016.
