= The Park Centre =

Shopping centre in Belfast, Northern Ireland

Park Centre

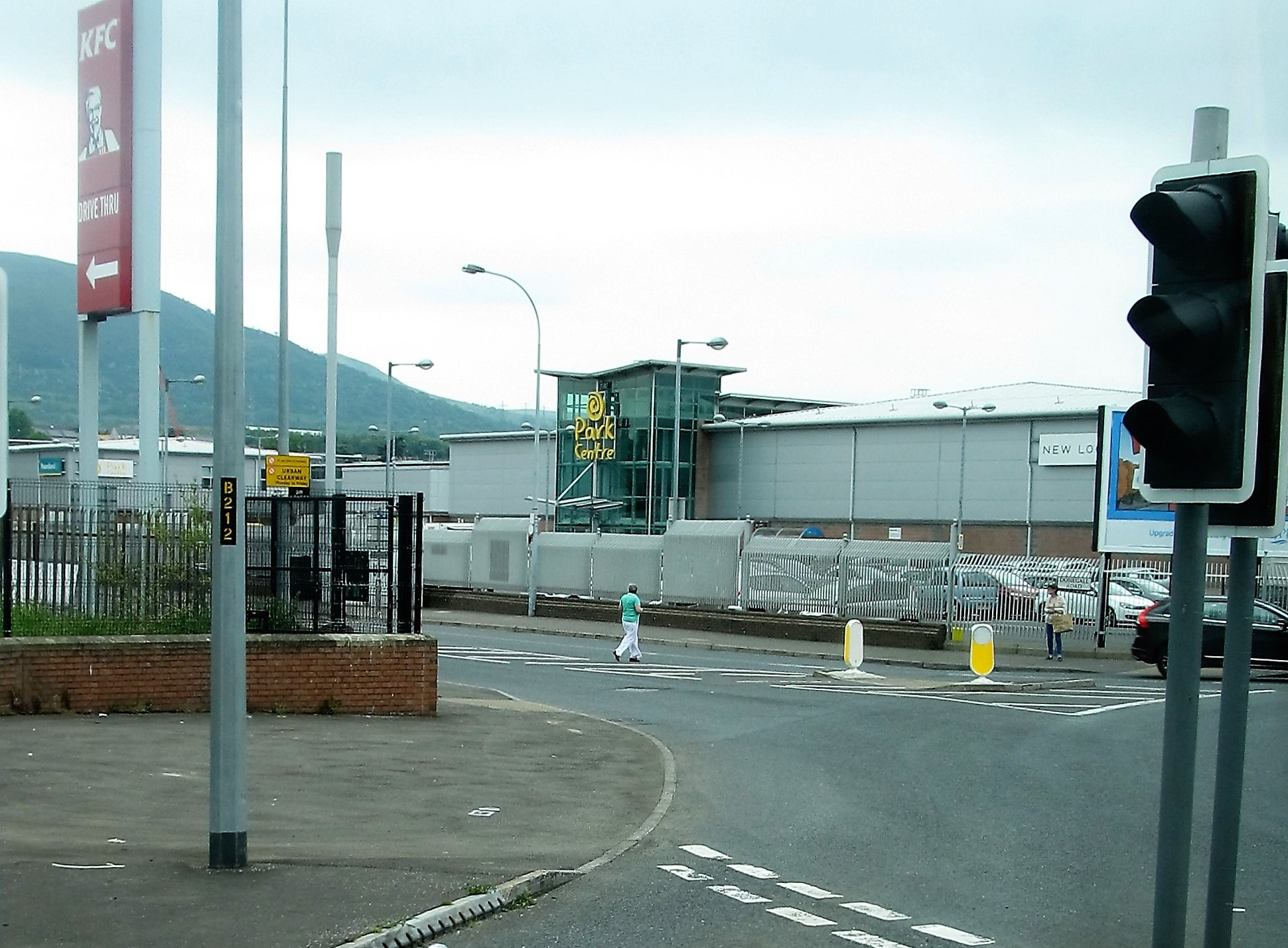
- Location: Belfast, Northern Ireland
- Opened: 15 April 1985
- Owner: Latt Limited
- Num. of stores: 35
- Num. of anchor tenants: 3
- Floor area: 161,458 sq ft
- Floors: 1
- Website: theparkcentre.co.uk

The Park Centre is a retail and leisure development that was constructed in a largely built-up residential area in South-West Belfast. The complex was constructed by Brookmount Properties Limited and opened on 15 April 1985. It is currently owned and operated by Latt Limited.

== History ==
The Park Centre opened its doors to the public on 15 April 1985 on the former grounds of the Belfast Celtic F.C. It was one of the few such shopping centres in the whole of Northern Ireland at that time.

In 2011, The Park Centre had a £400,000 renovation, which included an extension that expanded retail space. Shops within the centre have included JD Sports, Poundland and Specsavers, Peacocks and Iceland. The Park Centre also has a number of food outlets including a Subway, a local coffee shop and a Mace convenience shop.

In April 2019, an investment of £3 million was announced which included the creation of a B&M and a Home Bargains superstore that would replace the former Dunnes Stores food hall in the centre. B&M relocated as they had a presence in the centre.
