= Dunmore Stadium =

Former greyhound racing stadium in Northern Ireland

- Interactive map of Dunmore Stadium
- Location: Belfast, Northern Ireland
- Coordinates: 54°37′N 5°55′W
- Date opened: 1928
- Date closed: 2000
- Race type: greyhound racing

Dunmore Stadium was a greyhound racing track located in Belfast, Northern Ireland.

== History ==
Dunmore was the second greyhound stadium to be opened in Ireland, the first meeting at which was held on 6 September 1928. It closed in 2000.

=== Opening ===
Dunmore was opened as Belfast's second track after Celtic Park by the United Greyhound Association (Northern Ireland) Ltd. The directors were James McKee (responsible for the McKee/Jim Scott electric hare) and Captain John Ross. The hare system was the first to use an underground wire and it was such a success that McKee and Scott started the M.S Cable Hare Company. McKee also introduced the automatic trap release. The circuit was located near the Antrim Road at Alexandra Park Avenue, North Belfast.

=== Pre War History ===
The track established itself as one of the largest circuits in greyhound racing with a huge 575 yard circumference and 22 feet wide, the test of a greyhound's stamina was quite tough being such a big galloping track but this also resulted in minimal racing injuries. A tote was installed in 1930 but only lasted until 1932 due to the government ban that year which forced tracks to shut down the betting facility.

=== Second World War ===
During World War II the stadium suffered severe damage which resulted in the main stand being burned down in the 1942 Belfast Blitz. The racing operation moved to across the city centre to Celtic Park for the remainder of the season before being able to race again the following year. It was in 1943 that the Irish National Sprint over 435 yards was introduced and this event earned classic status for sprinters. The first winner was Fair Mistress.

=== Post War History ===
The war ended and a rebuild took place in 1946 but without a tote because although UK tracks were allowed to operate totes the government ban in Northern Ireland remained in place. In 1951 the Smirnoff Puppy Cup started and in 1962 the National Sprint champion Tanyard Chief was drowned in the Belfast floods.

Sixty on course bookmakers were operating on course in 1960, an unusually high amount but tote betting was still illegal in Northern Ireland at the time. In 1961 the Sean Graham 700 was introduced and Ian Ross was Racing Manager for thirty years. A leading greyhound called Yellow Printer made his racing debut on 6 June 1967.

By 1974 the troubles were having a considerable bearing on business and financial problems began to mount, a new board of directors consisting of the Jim Delargy, Sean & Brian Graham took over at Dunmore on 1 April 1977. The board included Jack McKee and Jack Hynds. The same Delargy/Graham group would take over Celtic Park less than a year later. Guinness stepped in as the sponsors of the Irish National Sprint and the track became all sand in 1978.

Sean Graham owned a bookmaking firm called Belfast Sporting and Leisure and they controlled the track in the 1980s, Sam Young became Racing Manager and an Australian Bramich hare was used, racing continued on Tuesday, Thursday and Saturday evenings. In 1981 the track introduced a new marathon distance of 1,005 yards, over six bends which indicated just how big the circumference of the track was. A totalisator was finally introduced in 1990. In 1983 the track was the first in Europe to install a Bramich hare.

The track received no support from the Bord na gCon or support from the National Greyhound Racing Club adding to financial problems. The racing ended in March 1997 and the last meeting attracted 3,000 patrons. The site was eventually redeveloped.

=== Other Sports ===
As Dunmore Park, it was also the home ground of Brantwood F.C. from 1920–30 and for another four-year period after the Second World War, and occasionally hosted boxing, including Jack O'Brien v Carl Petersen in 1930, Stan Rowan v Bunty Doran and Hughie Smith v Gerry Smythe in 1949. Hockey internationals were also organised at the venue before the war. Speedway took place during the 1949-1950 season and stock cars would also race around the stadium in the 1960s.

== Track records ==
Yards	Greyhound	Time (sec)	Date	Notes
360	Arties Rover	19.71	31 August 1985	
360	Toss Pit	19.60	19 May 1990	
410	Princes Pal	22.19	3 October 1987	
410	Wellpad Pal	22.12	20 November 1990	
435	Guideless Joe	24.16	1932	
435	Farloe Border	24.03	13 July 1940	National Sprint final
435	Fair Mistress	=24.03	4 September 1943	National Sprint final
435	Mad Tanist	23.89	12 September 1944	National Sprint SF / National and World Record
435	Sandown Champion	23.86	2 September 1950	National Sprint final
435	Keep Moving	23.65	1 September 1956	National Sprint final
435	Move Gas	23.60	1969	National Sprint final
435	Irish Rain	23.52	1970	
435	Benbradagh Luck	23.37	10 April 1971	
435	Benbradagh Luck	23.34	7 September 1971	National Sprint SF
435	Mr Colm	23.31	19 October 1972	
435	Curryhills Fox	23.11	13 August 1985	
500	Strong Mutton	28.51	1970	
525	Coolagh Ration	29.40	1950	
525	Blissful Pride	28.88	1970	
525	Ringside Flash	28.88	1978	
525	Drapers Autumn	29.19	31 May 1986	
550	Gangster Doll	30.54	22 September 1966	
550	Perfect Whisper	30.08	1 July 1991	
575	Denshill Fort	32.46	11 July 1987	
575	Rush For Silver	32.38	28 April 1990	
575	Murlough Flash	32.18	31 August 1991	
600	Hatton Black	34.52	May 1944	
600	Craig's Look	33.95	c.1960	
600	Ashley Park Ranger	33.74	4 July 1961	
600	Itsawitch	33.71	1978	
600	Ballydonnell Sam	33.53	14 April 1979	
600	Janets Pulsar	33.53	23 August 1986	
600	Toy Boy	33.48	25 August 1988	
700	Westpark Quail	39.13	1970	
700	Graigue Ring	39.12	7 November 1987	
700	Ratify	38.??	November 1993	
435 H	Carstown Boy	24.94	1960	
500 H	Half Hose	29.76	1970	
525 H	Carries Ferry	30.78	1950	

== Competitions ==
- National Sprint
