= McAlevey Gold Cup =

Former Greyhound racing competition in Ireland

- Location: Celtic Park
- Inaugurated: 1938
- Final run: 1983

Race information
- Distance: 525 yards

The McAlevey Gold Cup was a greyhound racing competition held annually at Celtic Park in Belfast, Northern Ireland. It was introduced in 1938 for greyhounds bred in Ireland and not over two years of age.

The competition was also known as the home-bred produce Stakes and offered a significant winner's prize of £600 in 1946. When the race was won by Dillies Pigalle in 1966 the winning time was a National Record.

The event was not held from 1978 to 1980 due to the temporary closure of Celtic Park. The competition came to an end in 1983 following the permanent closure of Celtic Park.

== Venues & distances ==
- 1938-1983 (Celtic Park, 525y)

== Past winners ==
Year	Winner	Time (sec)	Trainer	Notes/ref
1938	Leo's Gift	30.21		
1939	Myroe Roving Boy	30.12		
1940	Munster Hills	30.36		
1941	Carnagh Moon	30.14		
1945	Kilrea Try That	30.34		
1946	Mad Midnight	30.12		
1947	Priceless Border	29.54		
1948	Newhill Rose Again	30.12		
1949	Lone Train	29.54		
1950	Creole Fair	29.49	Tommy Ferguson	
1951	Aughaway	29.49		
1952	Clongorey Nina	30.24		
1953	Racing Snob	29.61		
1954	Coolkill Chieftain	29.75		
1955	Tully Joker	29.76		
1956	Dunmore King	29.44		
1957	Cleo's Sprig	29.32		
1958	Imperial Ivan	29.82		
1959	Northern Customer	29.14	Wilfie Tweed	
1960	Rockmount	29.33		
1961	This Is Broadway	29.51		
1962	Marne	29.62		
1963	Right Choice	29.68		
1964	Millies Dandy	29.14	Jack Mullan	
1965	Billy Gale	29.51		
1966	Dillie's Pigalle	28.86	Ronnie Chandler	Track Record
1967	Prince Queensnil	29.48		
1968	Rapid Streak	29.22		
1969	Piper Play	29.52		
1970	Kirkland Darkie	29.27		
1971	Rapid Brandy	29.51		
1972	Itsachampion	29.72	Leslie McNair	
1973	Killybrick	29.55		
1974	Lucky Mint	29.23		
1975	Win Sam	28.86		
1976	Garford Maxi	29.34		
1977	Macash Queen	29.38		
1978-80	not held			
1981	Cloghogue Lady	29.69	Frank McKee	
1982	Pialba	29.70		
1983	Major Black	29.48		
