= Celtic Park (Belfast) =

Former sports stadium and greyhound track in Belfast

Coordinates: 54.589099°N 5.962551°W

- Paradise
- Location within Greater Belfast
- Location: Belfast, Northern Ireland
- Capacity: 5,000 seated, overall 50,000.
- Surface: Grass

Construction
- Groundbreaking: 1899
- Opened: 1901
- Closed: 1983
- Demolished: 1986

Tenants
- Belfast Celtic; Greyhound Racing

Celtic Park was a multi-use stadium in Belfast, Northern Ireland. It was used for football matches and was the home of Belfast Celtic F.C. Throughout the majority of its existence it was a greyhound racing track. The stadium was able to hold 50,000 spectators at its height, with 5,000 of those spectators seated.

== Football ==
The stadium ceased to host Belfast Celtic matches when the team stopped playing competitive matches in 1949. Like Celtic Park in Glasgow, Scotland, it was known as "Paradise" by its fans. The football team ran into financial issues and finally dissolved in 1960 but the stadium was then firmly established as a greyhound stadium.

== Greyhound Racing ==
=== Origins ===
Two Belfast bookmakers called Joe Shaw and Hugh McAlinden visited to Belle Vue Stadium in 1926 to view the new form of greyhound racing around an oval. They duly formed the National Racing Greyhound Company with the assistance of Paddy O’Donoghue and James Clarke. It was the first greyhound track to open in Ireland on Easter Monday 18 April 1927, and one of the first in the United Kingdom. The company would take control of Ireland's second track Shelbourne Park in 1927.

McAlinden was the chairman of Belfast Celtic and he instigated the lease of the stadium for the racing which would be governed by the Irish Coursing Club, the official regulatory body of greyhound racing in Ireland. On opening night racing consisted of two hurdles races in the six race card and one race ended with a dead heat between Keep Whistling and Imperial Jimmy.

=== Early history ===
The first ever winner (not only at Celtic Park but in Ireland) was a greyhound called Mutual Friend (Three Speed x Lazy Peggy) on the Easter Monday; the April 1923 whelp was owned by Jim Tuite of Railway House, Oldcastle, County Meath. The 55th Old Boys Silver Band provided entertainment on the opening night.

Duneynie Castle claimed the Belfast Telegraph Cup competition in the summer of 1927 and re-opening for a second season in March 1928 patrons were able to purchase a complete form guide of the previous season from all Irish Coursing Club tracks for one shilling. Two months later on 11 May Mick the Miller finished third in the Abercorn Cup final at the track over 526 yards.

A major event introduced in 1926 was the Trigo Cup; William Barnett presented a cup to Celtic Park after his horse Trigo won The Derby and St Leger Stakes. The Trigo Cup would gain classic status some years later in 1944 and second major competition called the McAlevey Gold Cup was inaugurated in 1938. In 1932 and 1943 the track hosted the Irish St Leger one of Ireland's premier races and in July 1946, the first case of a greyhound traveling by air took place. Warrington greyhound Clady Border trained by Ken Newham went from Manchester airport to Belfast to take part in an event at Celtic Park in which he won.

The first Racing Manager at the Track was Jim Rice and after his passing he was honoured by the track hosting the Jim Rice Memorial Trophy. Another competition called the Ulster Sprint Cup was a regular event from 1930 and the Trigo Cup was also known as the Ulster Derby for many years.

=== Later history ===
In 1955, Spanish Battleship appeared at the track for his final race in Ireland. The track suffering from a lack of investment and hampered by the troubles in Northern Ireland began to go downhill. However, in 1978 a new board of directors took over, Sean and Brian Graham and Jim Delargy closed the track to allow for refurbishment and Eddie O'Hagan the Racing Manager retired. The changes included an all-sand track from grass. The track finally opened two years later during April 1980.

== Closure ==
Brookmount Properties bought the site for redevelopment and the last meeting was held on 31 October 1983. The site of Celtic Park is now occupied by a shopping centre.

== Competitions ==
- Trigo Cup/Ulster Derby
- McAlevey Gold Cup
- Irish St Leger

== Notable track records ==
Yards	Greyhound	Time (sec)	Date	Notes/ref
375	Caim Star	21.4-5	17 May 1929	
375	Solitude Star	21.2-5	28 April 1930	
375	Confusion	21.40	1 August 1930	
375	Divorced Princess	20.92	8 May 1931	
375	You Have Me	=20.92	24 August 1934	
375	You Have Me	20.89	31 August 1934	
375	Dark December	20.87	23 September 1935	
375	Lone Keel	20.83	18 September 1936	
375	Derryten	20.64	24 October 1941	
375	Fair Mistress	20.52	22 April 1942	
375	Hilarious Champion	20.16	9 July 1956	
375	Rito	20.13	26 October 1962	
375	Tanyard Chief	20.08	1962	
375	Fiery Effort	20.07	25 October 1965	
375	Kirkland Darkie	19.94	10 September 1971	
525	Guiding Pal	=30.60	18 July 1930	
525	Mike's Fancy	=30.60	21 July 1930	
525	Sister Olive	30.49	10 August 1931	
525	Queen of the Rock	30.40	6 May 1932	
525	Maghereagh Soldier	30.37	17 May 1935	
525	Maghereagh Soldier	30.25	29 May 1936	
525	Morning Signal	30.16	7 October 1936	
525	Myroe Roving Boy	=30.12	June 1939	
525	Braemar Monty	29.95	15 September 1939	
525	S. M. Oddity	29.60	18 October 1940	National record
525	Smartly Fergus	=29.60	26 June 1945	McAlevey Gold Cup heats
525	Priceless Border	29.54	23 May 1947	
525	Ballymore Cottage	29.38	27 June 1947	Trigo Cup
525	Coolkill Hero	29.36	4 June 1954	
525	Dunmore King	29.36	4 May 1956	McAlevey Gold Cup semifinal
525	Cautious Customer	29.19	14 September 1956	
525	Nimble Star	28.98	30 May 1958	
525	True Picture	28.97	2 June 1958	National record
525	Dillies Pigalle	28.86	13 May 1966	McAlevey Gold Cup final, National record
525	Kirkland Darkie	28.79	11 May 1970	National record, McAlevey Cup heats
525	Jemmy John	28.61	26 June 1970	National record, Ulster Derby final
550	Maghereagh Soldier	31.67	24 May 1935	Trigo Cup heats
550	Maghereagh Soldier	31.50	31 May 1935	Trigo Cup semi-final
550	Maghereagh Soldier	31.45	7 June 1935	Trigo Cup final
550	Maghereagh Soldier	31.35	15 June 1936	Trigo Cup first round
550	Strong Mutton	31.28	11 June 1936	Trigo Cup semifinal
550	Mazurka	30.98	30 April 1948	
550	Racing Nig	30.60	31 July 1959	
550	Racing Luck	30.54	1 August 1960	Ulster St Leger 2nd rd
550	Normac Venture	30.53	22 May 1964	
550	There's Hope	30.51	29 July 1964	Ulster St Leger
550	Tom's Dog	30.48	13 August 1965	Ulster St Leger final
550	Sulky Mac	30.38	7 August 1967	Ulster St Leger SF
600	Moorland Rover	34.3-5	22 April 1929	
600	Aughamore Lass	34.54	8 April 1938	
600	Sullivan's Mild	34.31	30 April 1945	
600	Smartly Fergus	33.99	15 June 1945	National record
600	Multiforbo	33.91	4 October 1957	
600	Ashley Park Boy	33.60	11 July 1958	
600	Ashley Park Boy	33.45	18 July 1958	
600	Yellow Streak	33.40	28 September 1966	Ulster Cesarewitch heats
600	Circular Grand	33.39	30 September 1966	Ulster Cesarewitch rd2
600	Clahane Flash	33.38	9 June 1967	
600	Fiery Sahara	33.36	21 August 1967	
600	Itsamint	33.34	20 October 1969	Ulster Cesarewitch final
600	Blissful Pride	32.90	4 October 1971	Ulster Cesarewitch 1st Rd
640	Dragon's Flight	37.3-5	9 September 1928	Trigo Cup heats
640	Bright Bundle	37.12	17 May 1931	
860	Clovis	52.20	11 October 1929	
860	Ilene Darling	51.95	14 October 1931	
860	Ilene Darling	51.55	30 October 1931	
375 H	Soft Slide	22.28	15 March 1935	
375 H	Neidin's Carnero	21.46	15 June 1936	
525 H	Flail	32.00	12 September 1930	
525 H	Macaroni	31.12	28 June 1935	
525 H	Magheragh Major	31.07	22 May 1936	
525 H	Nicotina	31.05	24 June 1938	
550 H	Neiden's Beautiful	32.70	10 September 1937	
600 H	Drumhaw	37.1-5	17 May 1929	
600 H	Flail	36.40	1930	
600 H	Another Circle	36.28	21 August 1936	

- H=Hurdles
