= Northern Ireland Civil Rights Association =

1967–1972 civil liberties group

The Northern Ireland Civil Rights Association (NICRA; Irish: Cumann Cearta Sibhialta Thuaisceart Éireann) was an organisation that campaigned for civil rights for Irish Catholics in Northern Ireland during the late 1960s and early 1970s. Formed in Belfast on 9 April 1967, the civil rights campaign attempted to achieve reform by publicising, documenting, and lobbying for an end to discrimination against Catholics in areas such as elections (which were subject to gerrymandering and property requirements), discrimination in employment, in public housing and abuses of the Special Powers Act.

The genesis of the organisation lay in the emergence of a more self-confident Catholic professional middle class who, following the example of the US civil rights movement, campaigned for equal rights and reform. The Campaign for Social Justice was formed in January 1964.

A younger generation, inspired by the 1960s wave of worker and student protests across Europe was also ready to take to the street to protest. They would go on to form People's Democracy in 1968.

The failure of the 1956-62 IRA border campaign encouraged Irish Republicans to prioritise radical popular street campaigns rather than rely on traditional physical force tactics. In this rethink of Republican strategy a key meeting took place in Maghera in August 1966 between the Wolfe Tone Societies which was attended by Cathal Goulding, then chief of staff of the Irish Republican Army (IRA).

During its formation, NICRA's membership extended to trade unionists, communists, liberals, socialists, with republicans eventually constituting five of the 13 members of its executive council. The organisation initially also had some unionists, with Young Unionist Robin Cole taking a position on its executive council. Official Sinn Féin and Official IRA influence over NICRA grew in later years, but only as the latter's importance declined, when violence escalated between late 1969 until 1972, when NICRA ceased its work.

== Origins ==
Since Northern Ireland's creation in 1921, the Catholic minority had suffered from discrimination from the Protestant and Unionist majority. James Craig, the first Prime Minister of Northern Ireland, declared to the Stormont Parliament "we are a Protestant Parliament and a Protestant State". Basil Brooke, who would later serve as Prime Minister of Northern Ireland for 20 years, in a speech to the Orange Order in 1933 stated "Many in this audience employ Catholics, but I have not one about my place. Catholics are out to destroy Ulster". Many historians regard the ethos of Northern Ireland as unambiguously sectarian.

- Electoral representation. In order to ensure that the interests of minorities were protected and limit the electoral success of Sinn Féin, the Government of Ireland Act established proportional representation (P.R.) as the electoral system to be used in local government and the parliaments of Northern Ireland and Southern Ireland. It did, however, allow for the parliaments to change the electoral system three years after first meeting. The Government of Northern Ireland contemplated abandoning P.R. in 1924, but feared antagonizing the Labour-led British government, so shelved the idea. However, after the Unionist Party lost 8 seats in the 1925 Northern Ireland general election, first past the post was introduced in time for the 1929 election. Despite losing more than 4% of the vote share compared with 1925, the Unionist Party managed to pick up 4 seats. Proportional representation for local government elections was abolished by the Northern Ireland government in 1920 for Northern Ireland's local elections in 1924.

The property franchise (which granted votes in local elections only to those who owned property) weighted representation heavily in favour of the Protestant community, as did the plural business votes they enjoyed for parliamentary elections. The result was that many towns and cities with a Catholic majority, even a substantial one, were Unionist-controlled: examples included Derry, Armagh, Dungannon, and Enniskillen. Electoral boundaries were carefully engineered: Belfast's representatives in Stormont went from 4 to 16 in 1921, but there was no increase in the nationalist representation, and Belfast continued to return one Nationalist Member of Parliament (MP).

In the 1965 Stormont elections the Ulster Unionist Party won 34 out of the 52 available seats, while in the 1966 elections to the Westminster parliament they won 11 of Northern Ireland's available 12 seats. The Stormont Assembly returned the Ulster Unionist Party to office continuously between Northern Ireland's founding in 1922 and the abolition of the Parliament in 1972.

- Policing. Of the institutions of state, the police in particular were rightfully, based on all available evidence, seen by Catholics and nationalists as supporting (and in many cases collaborating with) the Protestant majority and Unionist cause. Representation of Catholics in the Royal Ulster Constabulary, formed in 1922, never exceeded 20% and by the 1960s had sunk to 12%. The reserve police force (the Ulster Special Constabulary) was composed upon its formation largely of the paramilitary Ulster Volunteers and led by the Ulster Volunteers' former commander, Wilfrid Spender and remained almost exclusively Protestant until its disbandment.
- Employment. The 1971 census offered the first opportunity to assess the extent of any discrimination in employment, as it was the first census since 1911 that provided cross-tabulation by religion and occupation. The census documented that Protestant male unemployment was 6.6% compared to 17.3% for Catholic males, while the equivalent rates for women were 3.6% and 7% respectively. Catholics were over-represented in unskilled jobs and Protestants in skilled employment. Catholics made up 31% of the economically active population but accounted for only 6% of mechanical engineers, 7% of 'company secretaries and registrars' and 'personnel managers', 8% of university teachers, 9% of local authority senior officers, 19% of medical practitioners, and 23% of lawyers.
- Housing. Housing was inter-related with electoral representation, and therefore political power at local and Stormont levels. The general vote was confined to the occupier of a house and his wife. Occupiers' children over 21 and any servants or subtenants in a house were excluded from voting. So the allocation of a public authority house was not just the allocation of a scarce resource: it was the allocation of two votes. Therefore, whoever controlled the allocation of public authority housing effectively controlled the voting in that area.

Since 1964, the Campaign for Social Justice had been collating and publicising in its journal The Plain Truth what it regarded as evidence of discrimination. Its precursor, the Homeless Citizens League, had been holding marches to press for fair allocation of social housing. Both of these organisations had arisen at a time when the African-American civil rights organisation was headline news around the world. Both achieved success in bringing anti-Catholic discrimination to the attention of the media and, in the case of the Campaign for Social Justice, to politicians in Westminster.

The idea of developing a non-partisan civil rights campaign into one with wider objectives as an alternative to military operations, which the IRA Army Council had formally ceased on 26 February 1962, was pursued by the Dublin Wolfe Tone Society, although redirecting the civil rights movement to assist in the achievement of republican objectives had been mooted previously by others (including C. Desmond Greaves, then a member of the Connolly Association) as "the way to undermine Ulster unionism". The idea shared certain attributes with that of infiltrating Northern Ireland's trade unions as a means of furthering republican objectives, which had previously been tried and abandoned by the IRA in the 1930s.

The concept (set out in the August 1966 bulletin (Tuarisc) of the Wolfe Tone Societies) was to "demand more than may be demanded by the compromising elements that exist among the Catholic leadership. Seek to associate as wide a section of the community as possible with these demands, in particular the well-intentioned people in the Protestant population and the trade union movement." In 1969, after the civil rights movement had been active for several years, the strategy was described in Ireland Today, published by the Republican Education Department, as requiring that "the civil rights movement include all elements that are deprived, not just republicans, and that unity in action within the civil rights movement be developed towards unity of political objectives to be won, and that ultimately (but not necessarily immediately) the political objective agreed by the organised radical groups be seen within the framework of a movement towards the achievement of a 32-county democratic republic."

At a meeting which took place in Maghera on 13–14 August 1966 at the home of Kevin Agnew (a Derry republican solicitor), attended by the Wolfe Tone Societies of Dublin, Cork, Belfast, Derry, and County Tyrone, and the IRA's chief of staff, Cathal Goulding, it was proposed that an organisation be created with wider civil rights objectives as its stated aim. After these discussions an ad hoc body was formed which organised a seminar on 8 November 1966 in Belfast. The main speakers were the president of the Irish Anti-Apartheid Movement, Kader Asmal, a South African-born lecturer in law at Trinity College Dublin, and Ciarán Mac an Áilí, a Derry-born Dublin solicitor who was a member of the International Commission of Jurists and president of the Irish Pacifist Association.

The Republican movement increasingly saw campaigning around civil rights as a more productive way forward than the traditional armed struggle of physical force Republicanism. However, it would be an oversimplification to state that the IRA set up the Northern Ireland Civil Rights Association. This would ignore the importance of campaigns that were emerging within Northern Ireland, such as the Campaign for Social Justice, and the growing numbers of middle class Catholic professionals, Labour activists and left-wing students who were prepared to take to the streets over civil rights.

It was agreed that another meeting should be called to launch a civil rights body and this took place in Belfast on 29 January 1967. Tony Smythe and James Shepherd from the National Council of Civil Liberties in London were present and there were more than 100 delegates from a variety of organisations, including Northern Ireland political parties.

A 13-member steering committee was tasked at the Belfast meeting with drafting NICRA's constitution. One member, Dolley, had taken part at the meeting at Agnew's house. The original committee consisted of:

1. Chairman: Noel Harris, a trade unionist and member of the Draughtsmen and Allied Trades Association and the Communist Party.
2. Vice-Chairman: Conn McCluskey, one of the founders of the Campaign for Social Justice.
3. Secretary: Derek O'Brien Peters, of the Communist Party.
4. Treasurer: Fred Heatley, of the Wolfe Tone Societies.
5. Information Officer: Jack Bennett, a journalist with The Belfast Telegraph.
6. Betty Sinclair, a communist member of the Belfast Trades Council.
7. Liam McMillen, vice-chairman of the Republican Clubs and commanding officer of the IRA Belfast Brigade.
8. John Quinn, of the Ulster Liberal Party.
9. Professor Michael Dolley, of Queen's University Belfast, a civil libertarian and member of the National Democratic Party (Northern Ireland).
10. Joe Sherry, of the Republican Labour Party.
11. Jim Andrews, of the Ardoyne Tenants Association.
12. Paddy Devlin, of the Northern Ireland Labour Party.
13. Tony McGettigan, unaffiliated.

NICRA held a meeting to ratify the constitution on 9 April 1967. It was on this date that NICRA officially came into existence. There were some changes as the steering committee became NICRA's executive council, with Ken Banks of the Ardoyne Tenants Association replacing Jim Andrews; Kevin Agnew, a republican solicitor, replacing McMillen; and Terence O'Brien (unaffiliated) replacing McGettigan. Betty Sinclair became chairman. Robin Cole, a liberal member of the Young Unionists and chairman of the Queen's University Belfast Conservative and Unionist Association, was later co-opted onto the executive council.

== NICRA's constitution, aims and philosophy ==
NICRA, as it eventually emerged, differed from what had been outlined in Tuarisc and discussed at Agnew's home in Maghera. The form which NICRA took was determined by the coalition of forces which came together to create it, of which republicans were only one element. Civil rights were the banner to which republicans, nationalists, communists, socialists, liberals and the unaffiliated could rally. NICRA's executive council brought together such diverse groups as the republican Wolfe Tone Society and the Campaign for Social Justice, whose founders and leaders believed traditional nationalist politics were ineffective in serving the needs of the Catholic minority.

The constitution of NICRA was based on that of the British National Council for Civil Liberties. NICRA's name was expressed in English only. The constitution emphasised the association's character as non-party and non-denominational, and as a body which would make representations on the broad issues of civil liberties and would also take up individual cases of discrimination and ill-treatment and stated NICRA's aims as "to assist in the maintenance of civil liberties, including freedom of speech, propaganda and assembly". NICRA's aims were:

1. To defend the basic freedoms of all citizens.
2. To protect the rights of the individual.
3. To highlight all possible abuses of power.
4. To demand guarantees for freedom of speech, assembly and association.
5. To inform the public of their lawful rights.

It had six main demands:

1. "One man, one vote" which would allow all people over the age of 18 to vote in local council elections and remove the multiple votes held by business owners – known as the "business vote".
2. An end to gerrymandering electoral wards to produce an artificial unionist majority.
3. Prevention of discrimination in the allocation of government jobs.
4. Prevention of discrimination in the allocation of council housing.
5. The removal of the Special Powers Act.
6. The disbandment of the almost entirely Protestant Ulster Special Constabulary (B Specials).

=== Links with other civil rights associations ===
In conscious imitation of the philosophy of, and tactics used by, the American Civil Rights Movement, and modeled somewhat on the National Council for Civil Liberties, the new organisation held marches, pickets, sit-ins and protests to pressure the Government of Northern Ireland to grant these demands. The Northern Irish movement incorporated much of the African American movement's vernacular, and protest songs such as "We Shall Overcome" and "We Shall Not Be Moved" became common at NICRA protests. In 1968, Derry civil rights leader Finbar O'Doherty would refer to Northern Irish Catholics as Ulster's "white negros" in a speech that gained traction in the world's press. This widespread attention, particularly in the United States, helped NICRA secure a much wider international and internal support than traditional nationalist protests had done.

NICRA's innovation (drawing on the approach adopted by the Campaign for Social Justice) was to rely on and seek to vindicate civil rights, i.e. rights adhering to all citizens of Northern Ireland as British citizens under the existing constitutional settlement, rather than base its demands on the nationalist goal of reunification in a republic comprising the whole island of Ireland. For many supporters of NICRA, that did not mean accepting the constitutional settlement or entail any obligation of loyalty to the UK: assertion of those rights was a device by which the condition of the Catholic minority could be improved. However, from the outset there were tensions within the association between those advocating militant and confrontational methods, in particular the socialist and republican elements of the movement, such as Eamonn McCann, Michael Farrell and Cyril Toman, and those who remained wedded to the pacifist American civil rights model. Toman later joined Provisional Sinn Féin.

== Allegations against NICRA and ties with republicanism ==
The Northern Ireland government accused NICRA of being a front for republican and communist ideologies. Unionists suspected that NICRA was a front for the IRA. The involvement of republicans, such as IRA chief of staff Cathal Goulding, and groups like the Irish National Foresters, the Gaelic Athletic Association and the Wolfe Tone Societies would only further fuel their suspicions. After the failure of the IRA's Border Campaign, republicans had been seeking peaceful ways of advancing their cause by joining Trade Unions and the Northern Ireland Labour Party, and then NICRA when it was formed in 1967. On 4 October 1968, a day before NICRA's Derry march, the IRA admitted that it was infiltrating trade unions as well as civil rights marches.

NICRA arose from a meeting of the republican Wolfe Tone Societies. The republican movement was influential in getting NICRA to participate in protest marches, however, due to the various different groups that made up NICRA, it could not control the organisation's direction. The radical views of individuals within NICRA were highlighted by a commission of inquiry set up by the British Government following the spread of civil unrest in 1969. The report by a Scottish judge, Lord Cameron stated, "certain at least of those who were prominent in the Association had objects far beyond the 'reformist' character of the majority of Civil Rights Association demands, and undoubtedly regarded the Association as a stalking-horse for achievement of other and more radical and in some cases revolutionary objects, in particular abolition of the border, unification of Ireland outside the United Kingdom and the setting up of an all-Ireland Workers' Socialist Republic." Yet despite this, the aims of the NICRA executive, as set out in April 1969, maintained an aversion for an outright call for constitutional change in Northern Ireland and did not call for the end of partition. Bob Purdie has maintained that the outright republicanism of NICRA was more an issue of perception than of purpose and that the "civil rights movement was perfectly sincere in its view of its marches as non-sectarian".

== First civil rights march ==
In an effort to highlight the issue of public housing being allocated preferentially to Protestants in County Tyrone, Austin Currie, at a meeting of NICRA in Maghera on 27 July 1968, proposed holding a protest march from Coalisland to Dungannon Market Square. There was opposition to the idea from some in NICRA's executive, in particular from the NICRA chair and veteran communist Betty Sinclair who felt that unionists would see the march simply as a nationalist demonstration. After extended discussion the proposal was agreed and a march organised for 24 August.

A counter-protest was planned by Ian Paisley's Ulster Protestant Volunteers, who viewed the proposed march through the unionist-dominated Market Square as provocative. Hoping to avoid a confrontation, the UUP MP for South Tyrone, John Taylor, tried to get Paisley to abandon the counter protest, and have the NICRA march rerouted. The call for a reroute was supported by the Unionist mayor of Dungannon district. Late on 23 August arrangements were made to halt the march near Quarry Lane at Thomas Street, Dungannon, and divert it to Anne Street.

The Tyrone Brigade of the IRA sought permission from its Dublin headquarters to participate, resulting in a call for as many republicans to attend from Northern Ireland as possible. The NICRA march took place on 24 August 1968, attracting around 2,500 people and was followed by five nationalist marching bands from Coalisland to Dungannon. RUC officers prevented the march from entering Dungannon while 1,500 counter demonstrators jeered. Speeches were generally considered 'mild' with the exception of the address given by Gerry Fitt who said:

"My blood is boiling at the police ban and let me tell the County Inspector and District Inspector who are in charge of the police here to-night that they are only a pair of black bastards of Gestapo and we are not afraid of the blackthorn sticks and batons and but for the presence of women and children I would lead the march into The Square".

The march is considered to have passed off peacefully, though there are accounts of minor stone throwings with several marchers trying to break through the police line only to be rebuffed by the RUC and restrained by the marshalls. The chairperson of NICRA Betty Sinclair managed to convince the marchers to restrain themselves and show that they were "peaceful people asking for our civil rights in an orderly manner". The crowds dispersed without incident. Footage of the march can be found in the RTE archives.

== Derry March ==
The Coalisland-Dungannon march was considered a "disappointing anti-climax" and some more radical marchers felt that the police barricade should have been broken and that future police barricades would be broken. The Derry Housing Action Committee requested that the next march be held in Derry and was supported by the Derry Labour Party, the Derry Labour Party Young Socialists, the Derry Housing Action Committee, the Derry City Republican Club, the James Connolly Society and NICRA. On 8 September, a notice of the "Derry march" was submitted, with the march taking place on 5 October 1968.

The route proposed on behalf of the Civil Rights Association was one commonly followed by 'Protestant' and 'Loyalist' marches in Derry. It was to start from the Waterside Railway Station, east of the River Foyle, cross the river along Craigavon Bridge and proceed to the Diamond, the central point of the city. This route traversed certain Protestant districts and ended within the city's walls, which have major significance in Orange tradition. Local Unionists objected to the route of the march through what was viewed Unionist-dominated territory, and were concerned that the Diamond War Memorial would not be respected.

Unionist opposition hardened after Cathal Goulding, then IRA chief of staff, appeared on Ulster television on 27 September claiming that the IRA were actively supporting the civil rights campaign. On 1 October, the Apprentice Boys of Derry announced their intention to march the same route on the same day and time, although its governor said he knew nothing of a planned parade. William Craig, the Northern Ireland Home Affairs Minister, banned both the civil rights march and the Apprentice Boys' march on police advice in the hope of avoiding serious disorder. Craig said he was not against freedom of expression but that it should not be done in areas where it is likely to cause provocation, especially as he saw NICRA as "a republican-nationalist organisation".

With the march banned, and fearing that the presence of radicals may lead to violence, some members of NICRA's executive believed that they should withdraw their support for the march and unsuccessfully lobbied the Derry Housing Action Committee to call the march off. At a meeting of the South Derry IRA it was decided to push any of the politicians present on the day of the march into the police lines if marchers were blocked. The banned march started at the Waterside station, and attracted 400 protesters with local organisers duly insisting that MPs McAteer, Currie and Fitt should lead the march. Eamonn McCann (one of the organisers of the march) estimated that a further 200 watched from the pavements. Others there included Republican Labour MP Gerry Fitt, who brought three British Labour Party MPs with him, and members of the media.

The marchers decided to ignore the rerouting and were stopped by the Royal Ulster Constabulary before it had properly begun. After several marchers were hit by police batons, with Fitt being hospitalised, the marchers sat down and gave short speeches. This was followed by some retaliation from the marchers who hurdled stones and placards at the police. The police eventually moved in with batons, chasing and hitting those who fell by the wayside.

=== Aftermath ===
The footage of police brutality garnered global attention, the event having since been recalled, colloquially and academically, as the onset of the Troubles. Northern Ireland Prime Minister Terence O'Neill made his "Ulster at the crossroads" speech on television on 9 December, appealing for calm. As a result of the announcement of various reforms, NICRA declared a halt to marches until 11 January 1969, while People's Democracy disagreed with this stance.

Leading Derry Housing Action Committee member, Eamonn McCann, later admitted that, "our conscious if unspoken strategy was to provoke the police into over-reaction and thus spark off a mass reaction against the authorities".

== 1969 riots ==
Events escalated until August 1969, when fighting broke out at the annual Apprentice Boys of Derry march as it marched through the city's walls and past a perimeter with the nationalist Bogside area. Initially some loyalist supporters had thrown pennies down from the walls onto Catholics and mocked the Bogside's poverty. Catholics then threw nails and stones at loyalists leading to an intense confrontation. The RUC intervened, and a three-day riot ensued known as the Battle of the Bogside. Rioting quickly spread throughout nationalist areas in Northern Ireland, where at least seven were killed, and hundreds wounded. Thousands of Catholics were driven from their homes by loyalists.

In a subsequent official inquiry, Lord Scarman concluded, "We are satisfied that the spread of the disturbances [in Derry in August 1969] owed much to a deliberate decision of some minority groups to relieve police pressure on the rioters in Londonderry. Amongst these groups must be included NICRA, whose executive decided to organise demonstrators in the Province so as to prevent reinforcement of the police in Londonderry." In December 1969 and January 1970, both Sinn Féin and the IRA split into "Official" and "Provisional" wings, with the "Official" wings retaining influence in NICRA.

== Internment and Bloody Sunday ==
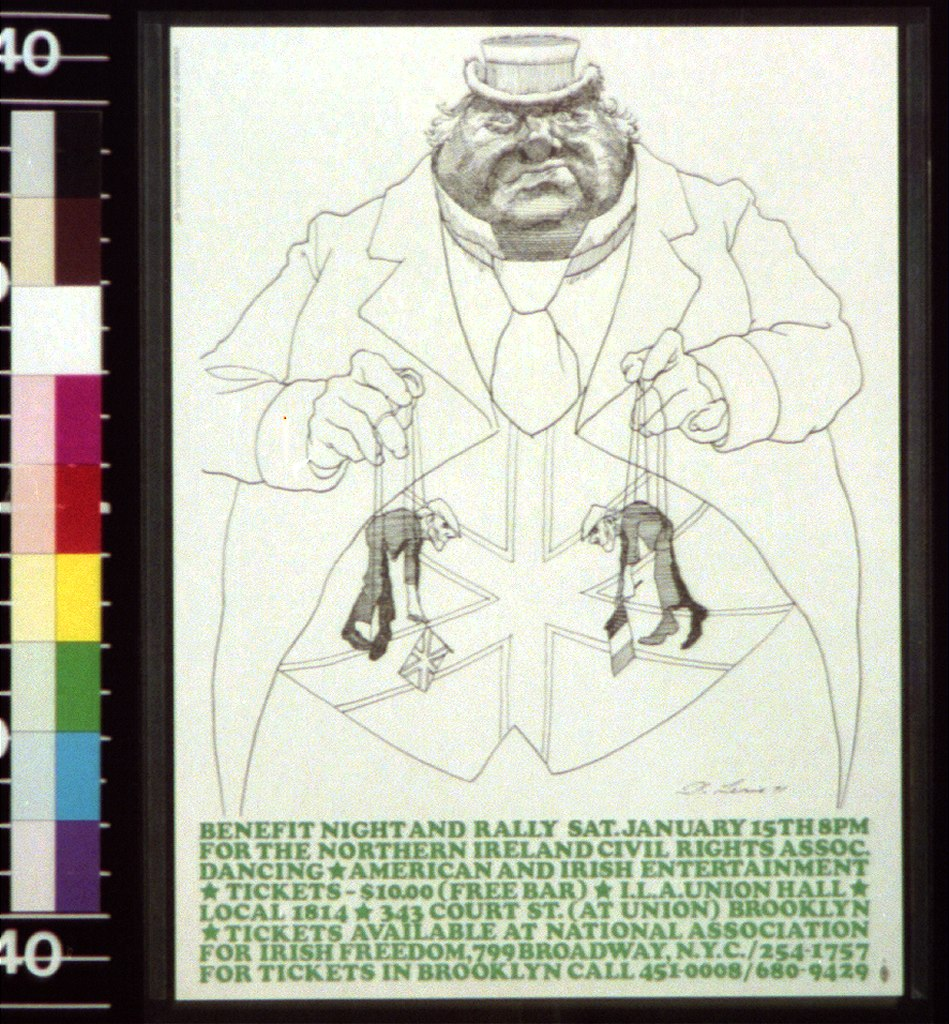
Poster for a benefit night in aid of NICRA in New York, 1972, organised by the National Association for Irish Freedom. The illustration depicts both Protestants and Catholics as being puppeteered by the wealthy elite.

The British government introduced internment on 9 August 1971 at the request of the Northern Ireland Prime Minister, Brian Faulkner. The British Army, in co-operation with the RUC, arrested and interned 342 people suspected of being involved with the IRA. 116 of those interned were subsequently found to have no involvement with the IRA and were quickly released.

The introduction of internment was not a closely guarded secret, with newspaper editorials appearing and discussion on television. The IRA went underground or fled across the border. As a result, fewer than 100 arrested were from the IRA. By this stage, support for NICRA began to wane, however NICRA continued to organise anti-internment marches. In Derry, on 30 January 1972, NICRA took part in a mass anti-internment march which had also been banned. Fourteen unarmed demonstrators were shot and killed by the Parachute Regiment during the march, and it became known as Bloody Sunday.

== Bibliography ==
- Bardon, Jonathan (2005). A History of Ulster. The Blackstaff Press. ISBN 0-85640-764-X.
- Coogan, Tim Pat (1995). The Troubles. London, UK: Hutchinson. ISBN 0091791464.
- English, Richard (2003). Armed Struggle;– A History of the IRA. London: MacMillan. ISBN 1-4050-0108-9.
- Foster, Roy F. (1988). Modern Ireland 1600–1972. London, UK: Allen Lane. ISBN 0-7139-9010-4.
- Hanley, Brian & Millar, Scot (2009). The Lost Revolution: The Story of the Official IRA and the Workers' Party. Dublin: Penguin Ireland. ISBN 9780141028453.
- McCann, Eamonn (2018). War and an Irish Town (3rd ed.). Chicago: Haymarket Books. ISBN 9781608469741.
- McKittrick, David (2012). Making sense of the troubles: A history of the Northern Ireland conflict (Rev. ed.). London: Penguin Books. ISBN 9780241962657.
- Purdie, Bob (1990). Politics in the Streets: the origins of the civil rights movement in Northern Ireland. The Blackstaff Press. ISBN 0-85640-437-3.
- Ruane, Joseph & Todd, Jennifer (1996). The Dynamics of Conflict in Northern Ireland: Power, Conflict and Emancipation. Cambridge University Press. ISBN 052156879X.
