= Campaign for Social Justice =

The Campaign for Social Justice (CSJ) was an organisation based in Northern Ireland which campaigned for civil rights in that region.

The CSJ was inaugurated on 17 January 1964 in Dungannon, County Tyrone, by Patricia McCluskey, who became its first chairwoman, and her husband, local general practitioner Dr Conn McCluskey. The couple had in 1963 established a Homeless Citizens' League to campaign against discrimination in the allocation of public housing. The CSJ was established, according to the founding statement, for "the purpose of bringing the light of publicity to bear on the discrimination which exists in our community against the Catholic section of that community representing more than one-third of the total population". The CSJ literature reached a large audience in Britain and the organization became affiliated with the British Labour Party and the National Conference for Civil Liberties (NCCL) in London. The NCCL helped form the Northern Ireland Civil Rights Association in 1967.
