= List of Northern Ireland international footballers =

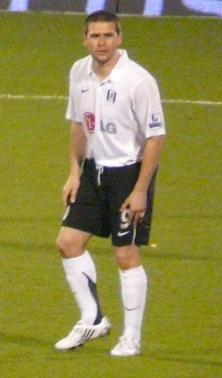
David Healy scored the most goals and made the third most number of appearances for Northern Ireland.

The Northern Ireland national football team represents Northern Ireland in international association football. It is organised by the Irish Football Association (IFA), which was formed in 1880, prior to the partition of Ireland. The original Ireland national team was selected by the IFA and included players from all of Ireland. Following the creation of the Irish Free State, the Football Association of Ireland (FAI) was set up and it picked its own national team. Until 1950, both Irish associations picked players from the whole of the island, which resulted in there being several 'dual internationals' (33 originating from the territory of the Irish Republic and six from the territory of Northern Ireland). After complaints by the FAI against this practice being used by the IFA during 1950 FIFA World Cup qualification matches, FIFA decreed that each association should select teams based on their own part of Ireland.

Until the 1950s, the only major competition entered by Ireland/Northern Ireland was the British Home Championship, which operated until 1984. The team won the competition eight times, taking the title outright on three occasions, including the last championship in 1984. The best World Cup performance by Northern Ireland was in their first appearance in the finals, the 1958 World Cup, where they reached the quarter-finals after beating Czechoslovakia 2–1 in a play-off. Northern Ireland became the smallest country to have qualified for the World Cup, a record that stood until Trinidad & Tobago qualified for the 2006 World Cup.

Northern Ireland qualified for the 1982 World Cup. Gerry Armstrong scored the goal in a shock 1–0 win against tournament hosts Spain, which helped the team progress to the second group stage by winning their first group stage. Norman Whiteside became the youngest player ever in the World Cup finals, breaking a record set by Pelé. Northern Ireland also qualified for the 1986 World Cup, but did not progress beyond the first group stage. Billy Bingham, a playing member of the 1958 squad, was manager for both of these tournaments.

Northern Ireland qualified for the UEFA European Championship for the first time in 2016. They defeated West Germany 1–0 both home and away in UEFA Euro 1984 qualifying and David Healy set a record for goals scored in one European qualifying section, by scoring 13 times in UEFA Euro 2008 qualifying.

== List of players ==
The list includes all players who were selected for Ireland (IFA) from 1882 to 1952 (including those from the territory of what became the Irish Republic, 33 of whom also played for the FAI team), and all those who played for Northern Ireland from then on. Caps/goals in unofficial wartime international matches are not included here, and any players who appeared in them but did not gain an official cap are not listed.

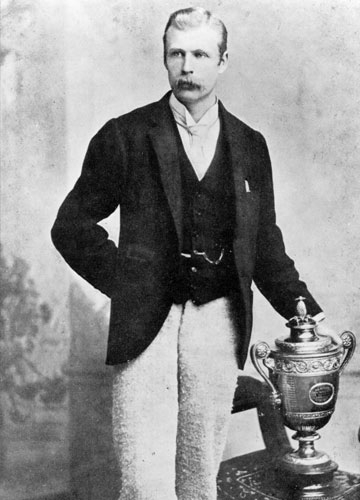
Willoughby Hamilton played once for Ireland, in 1885. He was also a tennis player and won the Wimbledon men's singles championship in 1890.

Key

*	Still active for the national team
Caps	Appearances

Pos	Positions
GK	Goalkeeper
DF	Defender
MF	Midfielder
FW	Forward

As of 21:10, 11 April 2023 (UTC)

Player	Pos	Caps	Goals	First cap	Last cap	Ref.
Tom Aherne	DF	4	0	1946	1950	
Tom Alexander	DF	1	0	1895	1895	
Cecil Allen	DF	1	0	1935	1935	
Jim Allen	DF	1	0	1887	1887	
Billy Anderson	DF	4	0	1898	1899	
Trevor Anderson	FW	22	4	1973	1978	
Billy Andrews	MF	3	0	1908	1913	
Gerry Armstrong	FW	63	12	1977	1986	
Chris Baird	DF	79	0	2003	2016	
Gideon Baird	FW	3	0	1896	1896	
Harry Baird	FW	1	0	1938	1938	
Jimmy Balfe	DF	2	0	1909	1910	
Daniel Ballard*	DF	18	2	2020	2023	
Joe Bambrick	FW	11	12	1928	1938	
Sam Banks	FW	1	0	1937	1937	
James Barron	FW	7	4	1894	1897	
Hugh Barr	FW	3	1	1961	1962	
Jack Barry	FW	3	0	1888	1889	
John Barry	DF	1	0	1900	1900	
Adam Barton	MF	1	0	2010	2010	
Bob Baxter	DF	1	0	1887	1887	
Sam Baxter	FW	1	0	1887	1887	
Lionel Bennett	DF	1	0	1889	1889	
George Best	FW	37	9	1964	1977	
Billy Bingham	FW	56	9	1951	1963	
Kingsley Black	MF	30	1	1988	1994	
Tom Black	FW	1	0	1901	1901	
Hugh Blair	MF	4	0	1931	1933	
John Blair	FW	5	0	1907	1908	
Ronnie Blair	MF	5	0	1974	1976	
Danny Blanchflower	MF	56	2	1949	1962	
Jackie Blanchflower	MF	12	1	1954	1958	
Alan Blayney	GK	5	0	2006	2011	
Louis Bookman	FW	4	0	1914	1921	
Andy Bothwell	FW	5	0	1925	1927	
Gerry Bowler	DF	3	0	1949	1950	
Liam Boyce*	FW	28	2	2011	2021	
Peter Boyle	DF	5	0	1901	1904	
Conor Bradley*	DF	12	0	2021	2023	
Bobby Braithwaite	MF	10	0	1962	1965	
Kevin Braniff	FW	2	0	2010	2010	
Tommy Breen	GK	9	0	1935	1939	
Batty Brennan	DF	1	1	1912	1912	
Bobby Brennan	FW	5	1	1949	1950	
Ronnie Briggs	GK	2	0	1962	1965	
Dave Brisby	FW	1	0	1891	1891	
Tommy Brolly	DF	4	0	1937	1939	
Ed Brookes	FW	1	0	1920	1920	
Noel Brotherston	MF	27	3	1980	1985	
Ciaron Brown*	DF	14	0	2019	2023	
John Brown	FW	3	0	1921	1924	
Jackie Brown	MF	10	1	1935	1939	
Nat Brown	FW	1	0	1887	1887	
Walter Brown	DF	1	0	1926	1926	
Bobby Browne	MF	6	0	1935	1938	
Fred Browne	DF	5	2	1887	1888	
Alex Bruce	DF	2	0	2013	2014	
Walter Bruce	MF	2	0	1960	1967	
Chris Brunt	MF	65	3	2004	2017	
Michael Bryan	MF	2	0	2010	2010	
Harry Buckle	FW	2	0	1904	1908	
James Buckle	MF	1	0	1882	1882	
Jack Burnett	DF	5	0	1894	1895	
Joe Burnison	DF	2	0	1901	1901	
Sam Burnison	FW	8	0	1908	1913	
James Burns	FW	1	0	1922	1922	
Malcolm Butler	DF	1	0	1939	1939	
Lee Camp	GK	9	0	2011	2012	
Albert Campbell	MF	2	0	1963	1964	
Billy Campbell	MF	6	1	1967	1970	
Bobby Campbell	FW	2	0	1982	1982	
David Campbell	MF	10	0	1986	1988	
James Campbell	FW	14	1	1897	1904	
John Campbell	DF	1	0	1896	1896	
Johnny Campbell	MF	2	0	1950	1950	
Tony Capaldi	DF	22	0	2004	2007	
Johnny Carey	DF	7	0	1946	1949	
Eddie Carroll	FW	1	0	1925	1925	
Roy Carroll	GK	45	0	1997	2017	
Josh Carson	MF	4	0	2011	2012	
Stephen Carson	MF	1	0	2009	2009	
Trevor Carson*	GK	8	0	2018	2022	
Chris Casement	DF	1	0	2009	2009	
Tommy Casey	MF	12	2	1955	1958	
Billy Caskey	FW	8	1	1978	1982	
Tommy Cassidy	MF	24	1	1971	1982	
Craig Cathcart*	DF	71	2	2010	2023	
Mark Caughey	FW	2	0	1986	1986	
Jimmy Chambers	FW	12	3	1921	1931	
Dion Charles*	FW	15	2	2021	2023	
Shea Charles*	MF	6	0	2022	2023	
Harry Chatton	DF	3	0	1924	1925	
James Christian	DF	1	0	1889	1889	
Colin Clarke	FW	38	13	1986	1992	
Robbie Clarke	FW	2	0	1901	1901	
Jim Cleary	MF	5	0	1982	1984	
Dave Clements	MF	48	2	1965	1976	
Sammy Clingan	MF	39	0	2006	2014	
Jack Clugston	GK	14	0	1888	1893	
Mark Clyde	DF	3	0	2004	2005	
Colin Coates	DF	6	0	2009	2011	
Davy Cochrane	MF	12	0	1938	1949	
Mick Cochrane	DF	8	0	1898	1901	
Terry Cochrane	MF	26	1	1975	1984	
Frank Collins	GK	1	0	1922	1922	
John Condy	FW	3	1	1882	1886	
Tom Connell	DF	1	0	1978	1978	
Jimmy Connor	DF	13	0	1901	1911	
Joe Connor	FW	3	1	1903	1904	
Billy Cook	DF	15	0	1932	1939	
Sam Cooke	DF	3	0	1889	1890	
Adrian Coote	FW	6	0	1999	2000	
Jackie Coulter	FW	11	1	1933	1938	
John Cowan	MF	1	0	1970	1970	
Tom Cowan	FW	1	0	1925	1925	
Fay Coyle	FW	4	0	1955	1958	
Liam Coyle	FW	1	0	1989	1989	
Roy Coyle	MF	5	0	1973	1973	
Alex Craig	DF	9	0	1908	1914	
David Craig	DF	25	0	1967	1974	
Stephen Craigan	DF	54	0	2003	2011	
Alex Crawford	DF	7	1	1889	1893	
Tucker Croft	FW	1	1	1923	1923	
Billy Crone	DF	12	1	1882	1890	
Bob Crone	DF	4	0	1889	1890	
Billy Crooks	FW	1	0	1922	1922	
Eddie Crossan	FW	3	1	1949	1955	
Johnny Crossan	FW	24	10	1959	1967	
Charlie Crothers	DF	1	0	1907	1907	
Lawrie Cumming	FW	3	0	1929	1929	
Bill Cunningham	DF	4	0	1892	1893	
Willie Cunningham	DF	30	0	1951	1962	
Jack Curran	DF	4	0	1922	1923	
Sammy Curran	FW	3	2	1926	1928	
Wilbur Cush	MF	26	6	1950	1961	
Stuart Dallas*	MF	62	3	2011	2022	
William Dalton	FW	11	4	1888	1894	
Jimmy D'Arcy	FW	5	1	1952	1953	
Johnny Darling	FW	21	1	1897	1912	
Hugh Davey	FW	5	1	1925	1928	
Steven Davis*	MF	140	13	2005	2022	
Tom Davis	FW	1	1	1936	1936	
Aidan Davison	GK	3	0	1996	1997	
Jack Davison	FW	8	0	1882	1885	
Robbie Dennison	MF	18	0	1988	1997	
John Devine	DF	1	0	1990	1990	
Oliver Devine	DF	4	0	1886	1886	
Billy Dickson	DF	12	0	1951	1954	
Des Dickson	FW	4	0	1970	1973	
Tommy Dickson	FW	1	0	1956	1956	
Jack Diffin	GK	1	0	1931	1931	
Alex Dill	FW	9	1	1882	1885	
Isaac Doherty	FW	1	0	1901	1901	
John Doherty	FW	2	0	1932	1932	
Lee Doherty	MF	2	1	1984	1987	
Matt Doherty	DF	1	0	1937	1937	
Peter Doherty	FW	16	3	1935	1950	
Tommy Doherty	MF	9	0	2003	2005	
Mal Donaghy	DF	91	0	1980	1994	
Leo Donnelly	DF	1	0	1913	1913	
Liam Donnelly*	MF	4	0	2014	2022	
Martin Donnelly	MF	1	0	2009	2009	
Jack Doran	FW	3	0	1920	1922	
Derek Dougan	FW	43	8	1958	1973	
Joe Douglas	DF	1	0	1946	1946	
Hugh Dowd	MF	3	0	1974	1974	
Iain Dowie	FW	59	12	1990	1999	
Michael Duff	DF	24	0	2002	2012	
Harry Duggan	MF	8	0	1927	1935	
George Dunlop	GK	4	0	1984	1989	
Jimmy Dunne	FW	7	4	1928	1932	
William Eames	DF	3	0	1885	1885	
Tommy Eglington	FW	6	0	1946	1948	
Alex Elder	DF	40	1	1960	1969	
Allan Ellemann	DF	2	0	1889	1890	
Stuart Elliott	MF	39	4	2000	2008	
Jimmy Elwood	DF	2	0	1929	1929	
Billy Emerson	DF	11	1	1919	1923	
Sam English	FW	2	1	1932	1932	
Joe Enright	FW	1	0	1912	1912	
Corry Evans*	MF	70	2	2009	2022	
Jonny Evans*	DF	100	5	2006	2022	
Eddie Falloon	MF	2	0	1931	1932	
Tom Farquharson	GK	7	0	1923	1925	
Paddy Farrell	FW	1	0	1938	1938	
Patrick Farrell	DF	2	0	1901	1901	
Peter Farrell	MF	7	0	1946	1949	
Jim Feeney	DF	2	0	1946	1949	
Warren Feeney	FW	46	5	2002	2011	
Warren Feeney, Sr.	MF	1	0	1976	1976	
Billy Ferguson	FW	2	1	1966	1966	
Glenn Ferguson	FW	5	0	1999	2001	
Shane Ferguson*	MF	57	2	2009	2023	
Jimmy Ferris	FW	5	1	1919	1928	
Ray Ferris	MF	3	1	1949	1951	
Alan Fettis	GK	25	0	1991	1998	
Tommy Finney	MF	14	2	1974	1980	
John Fitzpatrick	DF	2	0	1896	1896	
Hugh Flack	DF	1	0	1929	1929	
Tom Flanagan*	DF	15	0	2017	2022	
Gary Fleming	DF	31	0	1986	1994	
George Forbes	DF	3	0	1888	1891	
Tommy Forde	DF	4	0	1958	1960	
Thomas Foreman	DF	1	0	1899	1899	
James Forsythe	DF	2	0	1888	1888	
William Fox	DF	2	0	1887	1887	
Bertie Fulton	DF	20	0	1930	1938	
George Gaffikin	FW	15	4	1890	1895	
Billy Galbraith	GK	1	0	1890	1890	
Ethan Galbraith*	MF	2	0	2019	2020	
Patsy Gallacher	FW	11	0	1919	1927	
Charlie Gallogly	DF	2	0	1950	1950	
Andy Gara	FW	3	2	1902	1902	
Alf Gardiner	GK	5	0	1930	1931	
Jack Garrett	DF	1	0	1925	1925	
Robert Garrett	MF	5	0	2009	2011	
Ray Gaston	FW	1	0	1968	1968	
George Gaukrodger	FW	1	1	1895	1895	
Michael Gault	MF	1	0	2008	2008	
Arthur Gausson	FW	6	0	1884	1889	
Johnny Geary	FW	2	0	1931	1931	
James Gibb	FW	1	1	1936	1936	
John Gibb	FW	10	2	1884	1889	
William Kennedy Gibson	MF	13	1	1894	1902	
Billy Gillespie	FW	25	13	1913	1930	
John Gillespie	FW	1	0	1889	1889	
Keith Gillespie	MF	86	2	1994	2008	
Shaw Gillespie	GK	6	0	1886	1887	
Archie Goodall	MF	10	2	1899	1904	
Manliffe Goodbody	DF	2	0	1889	1891	
Hugh Gordon	DF	3	0	1895	1896	
Tom Gordon	GK	2	0	1894	1895	
Willie Gordon	DF	7	0	1891	1893	
Bill Gorman	DF	4	0	1946	1948	
Johnny Gorman	MF	9	0	2010	2011	
Bill Gowdy	MF	6	0	1931	1936	
Joe Gowdy	MF	6	0	1919	1927	
Len Graham	DF	14	0	1951	1958	
Phil Gray	FW	26	6	1992	2001	
Bill Greer	FW	3	0	1909	1909	
Harry Gregg	GK	25	0	1954	1963	
Danny Griffin	DF	29	1	1996	2004	
Will Grigg*	FW	13	2	2012	2018	
George Hall	FW	1	0	1897	1897	
Billy Halligan	FW	2	1	1911	1912	
Mickey Hamill	FW	7	1	1912	1921	
Rory Hamill	MF	1	0	1999	1999	
Billy Hamilton	FW	41	5	1978	1986	
Bryan Hamilton	MF	50	4	1969	1980	
Gary Hamilton	FW	5	0	2003	2004	
James Hamilton	GK	2	0	1882	1882	
Robert Hamilton	DF	5	0	1928	1931	
William Hamilton	FW	1	0	1885	1885	
William Hamilton	FW	1	0	1908	1908	
Willoughby Hamilton	FW	1	0	1885	1885	
Harry Hampton	DF	9	0	1911	1914	
Jack Hanna	GK	2	0	1912	1912	
John Hanna	FW	1	0	1899	1899	
Dinny Hannon	FW	6	1	1908	1913	
Terry Harkin	FW	5	2	1968	1970	
Alfie Harland	GK	1	0	1922	1922	
John Harris	DF	1	0	1921	1921	
Val Harris	FW	20	0	1906	1914	
Martin Harvey	DF	34	3	1961	1971	
Jack Hastings	DF	7	0	1882	1886	
Sammy Hatton	DF	2	0	1962	1962	
Billy Hayes	DF	4	0	1937	1938	
Conor Hazard*	GK	4	0	2018	2022	
David Healy	FW	95	36	2000	2013	
Felix Healy	MF	4	0	1982	1982	
Danny Hegan	MF	7	0	1969	1973	
Jack Hehir	GK	1	0	1910	1910	
Jack Henderson	GK	3	0	1885	1885	
George Hewison	DF	2	0	1885	1885	
Colin Hill	DF	27	1	1990	1998	
Jimmy Hill	FW	7	0	1959	1963	
Ted Hinton	GK	7	0	1946	1951	
Lee Hodson*	DF	24	0	2010	2018	
Shaun Holmes	MF	1	0	2002	2002	
Jimmy Hopkins	FW	1	0	1925	1925	
Kevin Horlock	MF	32	0	1995	2002	
Billy Houston	MF	1	0	1932	1932	
Johnny Houston	FW	6	0	1912	1914	
William Houston	DF	2	0	1885	1885	
Aaron Hughes	DF	112	1	1998	2018	
Billy Hughes	MF	1	0	1951	1951	
Jeff Hughes	MF	2	0	2006	2006	
Mark Hughes	MF	2	0	2006	2006	
Michael Hughes	MF	71	5	1991	2005	
Phil Hughes	GK	3	0	1986	1987	
Trai Hume*	MF	2	0	2022	2022	
Billy Humphries	MF	14	1	1962	1965	
Allan Hunter	DF	53	1	1969	1979	
Andy Hunter	FW	8	1	1905	1909	
Barry Hunter	DF	15	1	1995	1999	
Bob Hunter	GK	3	0	1884	1884	
Victor Hunter	GK	2	0	1961	1963	
Michael Ingham	GK	3	0	2005	2007	
Bobby Irvine	FW	15	3	1922	1931	
Bobby Irvine	GK	8	0	1962	1965	
Willie Irvine	FW	23	8	1963	1972	
Sam Irving	MF	18	0	1923	1931	
Tommy Jackson	MF	35	0	1968	1977	
Johnny Jamison	MF	1	0	1975	1975	
Iain Jenkins	DF	6	0	1997	1999	
Pat Jennings	GK	119	0	1964	1986	
Damien Johnson	MF	56	0	1999	2009	
Harold Johnson	FW	1	2	1927	1927	
Billy Johnston	MF	2	1	1962	1966	
Sam Johnston	FW	4	2	1882	1886	
Sam Johnston	FW	4	0	1890	1894	
Sid Johnston	DF	1	0	1905	1905	
William Johnston	DF	2	0	1885	1885	
Jack Jones	DF	23	0	1930	1937	
Jimmy Jones	FW	3	1	1956	1957	
Jordan Jones*	MF	18	1	2017	2021	
Sammy Jones	DF	2	1	1933	1933	
Steve Jones	FW	29	1	2003	2007	
Tom Jordon	FW	2	0	1895	1895	
Peter Kavanagh	FW	1	0	1929	1929	
Rory Keane	DF	1	0	1948	1948	
Alfie Kearns	FW	6	0	1900	1902	
Paul Kee	GK	9	0	1990	1994	
Dick Keith	DF	23	0	1957	1962	
Hugh Kelly	GK	4	0	1949	1950	
Jim Kelly	FW	1	0	1896	1896	
Jimmy Kelly	FW	11	4	1931	1936	
Paddy Kelly	FW	1	0	1920	1920	
Pat Kelly	GK	1	0	1949	1949	
Andy Kennedy	DF	2	0	1923	1924	
Matty Kennedy*	MF	3	0	2020	2021	
Peter Kennedy	DF	20	0	1998	2004	
Norman Kernaghan	FW	3	2	1936	1937	
Andy Kirk	FW	11	0	2000	2010	
Hugh Kirkwood	FW	1	0	1904	1904	
Jack Kirwan	FW	17	2	1900	1909	
Bill Lacey	MF	23	3	1909	1924	
Daniel Lafferty	DF	13	0	2012	2016	
Kyle Lafferty*	FW	89	20	2006	2022	
Paddy Lane*	MF	3	0	2022	2022	
Shayne Lavery*	FW	17	3	2018	2022	
James Lawrie	FW	3	0	2009	2010	
Ian Lawther	FW	4	0	1960	1962	
Ralph Lawther	GK	2	0	1888	1888	
Johnny Leatham	DF	1	0	1939	1939	
Joseph Ledwidge	DF	2	0	1906	1906	
John Lemon	FW	3	2	1886	1889	
Neil Lennon	MF	40	2	1994	2002	
William Leslie	DF	1	0	1887	1887	
Jamal Lewis*	DF	30	0	2018	2023	
Jim Lewis	GK	4	0	1899	1900	
Andrew Little	FW	9	0	2009	2012	
Henry Lockhart	DF	1	0	1884	1884	
Norman Lockhart	MF	8	3	1946	1956	
Steve Lomas	MF	45	3	1994	2003	
Joe Loyal	GK	1	0	1891	1891	
Matthew Lund	MF	3	0	2016	2017	
Bertie Lutton	MF	6	0	1970	1973	
David Lyner	FW	6	0	1919	1923	
Jack Lytle	DF	1	0	1898	1898	
James Macauley	FW	6	1	1911	1913	
Alec Mackie	DF	3	0	1923	1935	
Owen Madden	FW	1	0	1937	1937	
George Magee	FW	3	0	1885	1885	
Josh Magennis*	FW	71	10	2010	2023	
Eddie Magill	DF	26	0	1961	1966	
Jim Magilton	MF	52	5	1991	2002	
Hughie Maginnis	DF	8	0	1900	1904	
Ned Maguire	FW	1	0	1907	1907	
Jackie Mahood	FW	9	1	1926	1933	
Bert Manderson	DF	5	0	1920	1926	
Alan Mannus	GK	9	0	2004	2016	
John Mansfield	DF	1	0	1901	1901	
Christy Martin	FW	1	0	1925	1925	
Con Martin	DF	6	0	1946	1950	
David Martin	DF	3	0	1882	1883	
Davy Martin	FW	10	3	1933	1938	
Allan Mathieson	FW	2	0	1921	1921	
Jimmy Maxwell	FW	7	3	1902	1907	
Billy McAdams	FW	15	7	1954	1962	
John McAlery	DF	2	0	1882	1882	
Jimmy McAlinden	MF	4	0	1937	1948	
Joe McAllen	FW	9	1	1898	1902	
Sam McAlpine	GK	1	0	1901	1901	
Rory McArdle	DF	7	0	2010	2014	
Alex McArthur	FW	1	0	1886	1886	
Gareth McAuley	DF	80	9	2005	2018	
Pat McAuley	FW	1	0	1900	1900	
Stephen McBride	FW	4	0	1990	1991	
Jimmy McCabe	MF	6	0	1948	1953	
William McCabe	FW	1	0	1891	1891	
Alfie McCalmont*	MF	4	0	2019	2021	
Jimmy McCambridge	FW	4	0	1930	1931	
Billy McCandless	DF	9	1	1919	1929	
Jack McCandless	FW	5	2	1912	1920	
Ali McCann*	MF	16	1	2020	2022	
Grant McCann	MF	39	4	2001	2012	
Paddy McCann	DF	7	0	1910	1913	
Shay McCartan*	FW	2	0	2017	2018	
Jon McCarthy	MF	18	0	1996	2001	
Alec McCartney	DF	15	0	1903	1909	
George McCartney	DF	34	1	2001	2010	
John McCashin	FW	4	0	1896	1899	
Terry McCavana	MF	3	0	1954	1955	
Harold McCaw	MF	5	1	1927	1931	
John McClatchey	FW	3	0	1886	1886	
Tom McClatchey	DF	1	0	1895	1895	
Ernie McCleary	DF	1	0	1955	1955	
Billy McCleery	DF	9	0	1929	1932	
Jack McClelland	GK	6	0	1960	1966	
John McClelland	DF	53	1	1980	1990	
Sam McClelland*	DF	1	0	2021	2021	
Andy McCluggage	DF	12	2	1923	1931	
George McClure	DF	4	0	1907	1909	
William McConnell	DF	6	0	1912	1914	
Billy McConnell	DF	8	0	1925	1928	
English McConnell	DF	12	0	1904	1910	
Paddy McConnell	FW	2	0	1928	1931	
Frank McCourt	MF	6	0	1951	1953	
Paddy McCourt	MF	18	2	2002	2015	
Ray McCoy	MF	1	0	1987	1987	
Sam McCoy	DF	1	0	1896	1896	
Billy McCracken	DF	15	1	1902	1923	
Roy McCracken	DF	4	0	1920	1922	
David McCreery	MF	67	0	1976	1990	
Sammy McCrory	FW	1	1	1957	1957	
Billy McCullough	DF	10	0	1961	1966	
Keillor McCullough	MF	5	0	1935	1936	
Luke McCullough*	DF	6	0	2014	2018	
Colin McCurdy	FW	1	1	1980	1980	
Alan McDonald	DF	52	3	1985	1996	
Whitey McDonald	DF	2	0	1930	1931	
Johnny McDonnell	FW	4	0	1911	1913	
Gerry McElhinney	DF	6	0	1983	1984	
Lee McEvilly	FW	1	0	2002	2002	
Willie McFaul	GK	6	0	1966	1973	
Kevin McGarry	MF	3	1	1950	1951	
Martin McGaughey	FW	1	0	1984	1984	
Cameron McGeehan*	MF	1	0	2023	2023	
Pat McGibbon	DF	7	0	1995	2000	
Niall McGinn*	MF	73	6	2008	2022	
Ryan McGivern	DF	24	0	2008	2016	
Michael McGovern*	GK	33	0	2010	2020	
Chris McGrath	MF	21	4	1974	1979	
Sammy McGregor	FW	1	0	1924	1927	
Jack McGrillen	FW	2	0	1921	1921	
Hugh McIlroy	DF	1	0	1906	1906	
Jimmy McIlroy	MF	55	10	1951	1965	
Sammy McIlroy	MF	88	5	1972	1986	
Bob McIlvenny	FW	2	0	1890	1891	
Paddy McIlvenny	FW	1	0	1924	1924	
Billy Mckay	FW	11	0	2013	2016	
Billy McKeag	DF	2	0	1967	1968	
Fred McKee	GK	5	0	1906	1914	
Hiriam McKee	DF	3	0	1895	1895	
Hugh McKelvie	FW	1	0	1901	1901	
Johnny McKenna	MF	7	0	1949	1951	
Hamilton McKenzie	FW	1	0	1923	1923	
Roddy McKenzie	GK	1	0	1967	1967	
Nathaniel McKeown	DF	7	0	1892	1894	
Daniel McKinney	FW	2	0	1921	1924	
Vic McKinney	MF	1	0	1966	1966	
Allen McKnight	GK	10	0	1987	1989	
James McKnight	FW	2	2	1912	1913	
Conor McLaughlin*	DF	43	1	2011	2021	
Jim McLaughlin	FW	12	6	1961	1966	
Ryan McLaughlin*	DF	5	0	2014	2018	
Brian McLean	DF	1	0	2006	2006	
Tom McLean	FW	1	0	1885	1885	
Gerry McMahon	MF	17	2	1995	1997	
James McMahon	DF	1	0	1933	1933	
George McMaster	MF	3	0	1897	1897	
Conor McMenamin*	FW	2	0	2022	2022	
Alf McMichael	DF	40	0	1949	1960	
George McMillan	DF	2	0	1903	1905	
Sammy McMillan	MF	2	0	1962	1962	
Walter McMillen	DF	7	0	1933	1938	
Eric McMordie	MF	21	3	1968	1972	
Eddie McMorran	MF	15	4	1946	1957	
David McMullan	MF	3	0	1925	1927	
Paddy McNair*	MF	60	6	2015	2023	
Bernard McNally	MF	5	0	1986	1988	
Joe McNinch	DF	3	0	1931	1931	
James McPake	DF	1	0	2012	2012	
Peter McParland	FW	34	10	1954	1962	
Josh McQuoid	MF	5	0	2010	2011	
John McShane	DF	4	0	1899	1900	
Paul McVeigh	FW	20	0	1999	2004	
John McVicker	DF	2	0	1888	1889	
William McWha	FW	7	1	1882	1885	
Hugh Meek	FW	1	0	1925	1925	
Bert Mehaffy	GK	1	0	1922	1922	
Philip Meldon	FW	2	1	1899	1899	
Harry Mercer	FW	1	0	1908	1908	
Johnnie Mercer	FW	11	0	1898	1905	
Willie Millar	FW	2	0	1931	1932	
Joe Miller	DF	3	0	1929	1929	
Dudley Milligan	FW	1	1	1939	1939	
Bob Milne	FW	27	2	1894	1906	
Billy Mitchell	DF	15	0	1931	1937	
Eddie Mitchell	FW	2	0	1932	1933	
Tom Molyneux	DF	11	1	1883	1888	
Frank Montgomery	DF	1	0	1954	1954	
Bob Moore	DF	2	0	1887	1887	
Cecil Moore	GK	1	0	1949	1949	
Paddy Moore	FW	1	0	1932	1932	
Richard Moore	DF	3	0	1891	1891	
William Moore	FW	1	0	1923	1923	
Frederick Moorhead	DF	1	0	1885	1885	
George Moorhead	DF	3	0	1923	1929	
Joe Moran	DF	1	0	1912	1912	
Victor Moreland	MF	6	1	1978	1979	
Gerry Morgan	DF	8	0	1922	1928	
Sammy Morgan	FW	18	3	1972	1978	
Bob Morrison	DF	2	0	1891	1891	
Tommy Morrison	FW	7	0	1895	1902	
Donald Morrogh	FW	1	0	1896	1896	
Steve Morrow	DF	39	1	1990	1999	
William Morrow	MF	3	1	1883	1884	
Robert Muir	DF	2	0	1885	1885	
Jamie Mulgrew	MF	2	0	2010	2010	
Tom Mulholland	FW	2	0	1906	1906	
Gerry Mullan	FW	4	0	1983	1983	
Jimmy Mulligan	DF	1	0	1921	1921	
Philip Mulryne	MF	27	3	1997	2005	
Colin Murdock	DF	34	1	2000	2006	
John Murphy	FW	3	0	1910	1910	
Neeley Murphy	FW	3	1	1905	1905	
Jimmy Murray	FW	3	0	1910	1910	
John Napier	DF	1	0	1966	1966	
Terry Neill	DF	59	2	1961	1973	
Pat Nelis	FW	1	0	1922	1922	
Sammy Nelson	DF	51	1	1970	1982	
Chris Nicholl	DF	51	3	1974	1983	
Harry Nicholl	DF	3	0	1902	1905	
Jimmy Nicholl	DF	73	1	1976	1986	
Jimmy Nicholson	MF	41	6	1960	1971	
Rab Nixon	FW	1	0	1914	1914	
Ian Nolan	DF	18	0	1996	2002	
Jim Nolan-Whelan	GK	4	0	1901	1902	
Oliver Norwood	MF	57	0	2010	2018	
George O'Boyle	FW	13	1	1994	1998	
Mick O'Brien	MF	10	0	1921	1927	
Patrick O'Connell	DF	5	0	1912	1914	
Michael O'Connor	MF	11	0	2008	2013	
Tony O'Doherty	MF	2	0	1970	1970	
Jackie O'Driscoll	MF	3	0	1948	1949	
Billy O'Hagan	GK	2	0	1919	1920	
Charlie O'Hagan	FW	11	2	1905	1909	
Liam O'Kane	DF	20	1	1970	1975	
Matt O'Mahoney	DF	1	0	1938	1938	
Colin O'Neill	MF	3	0	1989	1991	
Jimmy O'Neill	FW	1	0	1962	1962	
John O'Neill	DF	39	2	1980	1986	
Martin O'Neill	MF	64	9	1971	1984	
Michael O'Neill	MF	31	4	1988	1996	
Harry O'Reilly	FW	3	0	1901	1904	
Jordan Owens	FW	1	0	2011	2011	
John Parke	DF	14	0	1963	1967	
Martin Paterson	FW	22	3	2007	2014	
Paul Paton	MF	4	0	2014	2017	
Darren Patterson	DF	17	1	1994	1999	
Rory Patterson	FW	5	1	2010	2011	
Bertie Peacock	MF	31	2	1951	1961	
Bailey Peacock-Farrell*	GK	37	0	2018	2023	
Jack Peden	FW	24	7	1887	1899	
Steve Penney	MF	17	2	1984	1988	
James Percy	FW	1	0	1889	1889	
Jim Platt	GK	23	0	1976	1986	
Jack Ponsonby	DF	9	0	1895	1899	
Renwick Potts	FW	2	0	1883	1883	
Isaac Price*	MF	2	0	2023	2023	
Tommy Priestley	FW	2	0	1932	1933	
James Pyper	FW	7	2	1897	1900	
John Pyper	DF	9	1	1897	1902	
Maurice Pyper	DF	1	0	1931	1931	
James Quinn	FW	50	4	1996	2006	
Jimmy Quinn	FW	46	12	1984	1995	
Peter Rafferty	MF	1	0	1979	1979	
Paul Ramsey	DF	14	0	1983	1989	
James Rankin	GK	2	0	1883	1883	
David Rattray	DF	3	0	1882	1883	
Bob Rea	FW	1	0	1901	1901	
Robert Redmond	FW	1	0	1884	1884	
Ben Reeves	FW	2	0	2014	2015	
George Reid	FW	1	0	1923	1923	
Jack Reid	FW	6	0	1883	1890	
Sid Reid	DF	3	0	1933	1935	
Willie Reid	DF	1	0	1930	1930	
Matt Reilly	GK	2	0	1900	1902	
Bill Renneville	MF	4	0	1910	1911	
Jack Reynolds	MF	5	1	1890	1891	
Robert Reynolds	GK	1	0	1905	1905	
Pat Rice	DF	49	0	1968	1979	
Fred Roberts	FW	1	0	1931	1931	
Pat Robinson	FW	2	0	1920	1921	
Steve Robinson	MF	7	0	1997	2007	
Anton Rogan	DF	18	0	1987	1996	
David Rollo	DF	16	0	1912	1926	
Edward Roper	FW	1	0	1886	1886	
Archie Rosbottom	DF	7	0	1887	1889	
Eric Ross	FW	1	0	1968	1968	
Keith Rowland	DF	19	1	1993	1999	
Dick Rowley	FW	6	2	1929	1931	
Alex Russell	GK	1	0	1946	1946	
Sam Russell	DF	3	0	1929	1931	
Reg Ryan	MF	1	0	1950	1950	
Lawrie Sanchez	MF	3	0	1986	1989	
George Saville*	MF	44	0	2017	2023	
Billy Scott	GK	25	0	1903	1913	
Elisha Scott	GK	31	0	1920	1936	
Jackie Scott	MF	2	0	1958	1958	
James Scott	FW	1	0	1901	1901	
Lewis Scott	DF	2	0	1895	1895	
Peter Scott	DF	10	0	1975	1979	
Tom Scott	GK	13	0	1894	1900	
Johnny Scraggs	DF	2	0	1921	1921	
John Seymour	DF	2	0	1907	1909	
Ted Seymour	FW	1	0	1914	1914	
Tom Shanks	FW	3	0	1903	1905	
Pat Sharkey	MF	1	0	1976	1976	
George Sheehan	FW	3	0	1899	1900	
Jimmy Sheridan	FW	6	2	1903	1905	
Joe Sherrard	FW	3	1	1885	1888	
William Sherrard	FW	3	2	1895	1895	
James Sherry	MF	2	0	1906	1907	
Jimmy Shields	FW	1	0	1956	1956	
Dean Shiels	MF	14	1	2005	2012	
Modesto Silo	DF	1	0	1888	1888	
Billy Simpson	FW	12	5	1951	1958	
Jack Sinclair	FW	2	0	1882	1882	
Jack Slemin	FW	1	0	1909	1909	
Andrew Sloan	FW	1	0	1925	1925	
David Sloan	FW	2	0	1968	1970	
Harold Sloan	FW	8	4	1903	1909	
Paddy Sloan	FW	1	0	1947	1947	
Tom Sloan	DF	11	0	1925	1931	
Tom Sloan	MF	3	0	1979	1979	
James Small	FW	4	0	1887	1893	
Andy Smith	FW	18	0	2003	2005	
Bert Smith	DF	4	0	1921	1923	
James Smith	FW	2	0	1901	1901	
Michael Smith*	DF	19	1	2016	2021	
Billy Smyth	GK	4	0	1948	1953	
Paul Smyth*	FW	3	1	2018	2021	
Richard Smyth	FW	1	0	1886	1886	
Sammy Smyth	FW	9	5	1947	1951	
Alfie Snape	FW	1	0	1919	1919	
Danny Sonner	MF	13	0	1997	2004	
Luke Southwood*	GK	1	0	2022	2022	
Derek Spence	FW	29	3	1975	1982	
Brodie Spencer*	MF	3	0	2022	2022	
Sammy Spencer	DF	6	0	1890	1893	
Ned Spiller	FW	5	0	1883	1884	
Ivan Sproule	MF	11	1	2005	2007	
Olphert Stanfield	FW	30	10	1887	1897	
Alex Steele	MF	4	0	1926	1929	
Jonny Steele	MF	3	0	2013	2014	
Alex Stevenson	FW	17	5	1933	1947	
Arthur Stewart	DF	7	0	1967	1968	
Dave Stewart	FW	1	0	1977	1977	
Ian Stewart	FW	31	2	1982	1987	
Robert Stewart	DF	11	0	1890	1894	
Tommy Stewart	FW	1	0	1961	1961	
Sam Swan	DF	1	0	1899	1899	
Gerry Taggart	DF	51	7	1990	2002	
Jack Taggart	DF	1	0	1899	1899	
Dale Taylor*	FW	1	0	2021	2021	
Maik Taylor	GK	88	0	1999	2011	
Adam Thompson	DF	2	0	2011	2011	
Frank Thompson	FW	12	3	1910	1914	
James Thompson	GK	1	0	1897	1897	
Jordan Thompson*	MF	28	0	2018	2023	
Peter Thompson	FW	8	1	2005	2008	
William Thompson*	MF	1	0	1889	1889	
Paddy Thunder	DF	1	0	1911	1911	
Sammy Todd	DF	11	0	1966	1971	
Ciarán Toner	MF	2	0	2003	2003	
Joe Toner	FW	8	0	1922	1927	
Rab Torrans	DF	1	0	1893	1893	
Sam Torrans	MF	26	1	1889	1901	
Danny Trainor	FW	1	0	1967	1967	
Jonathan Tuffey	GK	8	0	2008	2011	
Charlie Tully	MF	10	3	1948	1958	
Adam Turner	FW	1	1	1896	1896	
Edward Turner	FW	1	0	1896	1896	
William Turner	FW	3	0	1886	1888	
Jim Twomey	GK	2	0	1938	1938	
Norman Uprichard	GK	18	0	1951	1958	
Kyle Vassell*	FW	2	0	2018	2018	
Jackie Vernon	DF	17	0	1946	1951	
Tom Waddell	FW	1	0	1906	1906	
Jimmy Walker	FW	1	1	1955	1955	
John Walker	FW	1	0	1911	1911	
Billy Walsh	MF	5	0	1947	1948	
Davy Walsh	FW	9	5	1946	1950	
Jamie Ward*	FW	35	4	2011	2018	
Jack Waring	FW	1	0	1899	1899	
Peter Warren	DF	2	0	1913	1913	
Conor Washington*	FW	37	6	2016	2023	
Jimmy Watson	DF	9	0	1883	1888	
Peter Watson	FW	1	0	1971	1971	
Tom Watson	DF	1	0	1926	1926	
Jackie Wattie	FW	1	0	1899	1899	
Charlie Webb	FW	3	0	1909	1911	
Sean Webb	DF	4	0	2006	2007	
Ned Weir	MF	1	0	1939	1939	
Eric Welsh	FW	4	1	1966	1967	
Norman Whiteside	MF	38	9	1982	1989	
Tommy Whiteside	FW	1	1	1891	1891	
Edward Whitfield	DF	1	0	1886	1886	
Jeff Whitley	MF	20	2	1997	2005	
Jim Whitley	MF	3	0	1998	1999	
Gavin Whyte*	MF	30	5	2018	2023	
James Williams	FW	2	1	1886	1886	
Mark Williams	DF	36	1	1999	2005	
Paul Williams	FW	1	0	1991	1991	
James Williamson	MF	3	0	1890	1893	
Tom Willighan	DF	2	0	1932	1933	
George Willis	DF	4	0	1906	1912	
Bob Wilson	DF	1	0	1888	1888	
Danny Wilson	MF	24	1	1986	1992	
Harry Wilson	MF	1	0	1925	1925	
Kevin Wilson	FW	42	6	1987	1995	
Matt Wilson	DF	3	0	1884	1884	
Sammy Wilson	FW	12	7	1961	1967	
James Wilton	FW	7	2	1888	1893	
Carl Winchester	MF	1	0	2011	2011	
Trevor Wood	GK	1	0	1995	1995	
Nigel Worthington	DF	66	0	1984	1997	
Jack Wright	DF	6	0	1906	1907	
Tommy Wright	GK	31	0	1989	1999	
Samuel Young	FW	9	2	1907	1914	
