= Sam Torrans =

Irish footballer (1869–1948)

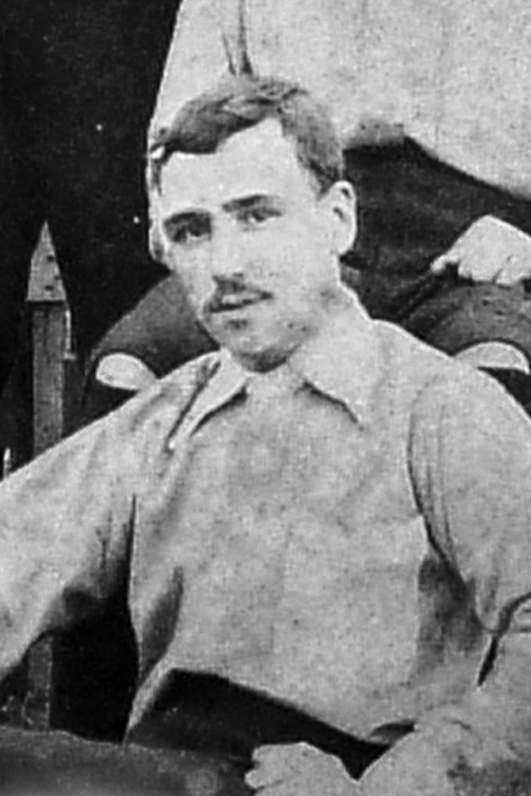
- Torrans c. 1890

Personal information
- Full name: Samuel Torrans
- Date of birth: 4 February 1869
- Place of birth: Belfast, Ireland
- Date of death: 8 May 1948 (aged 79)
- Positions: Left half; forward; left-back

Senior career*
| Years | Team | Apps | (Gls) |
| 1886–1902 | Linfield | | (29+) |
| Total | | | (29+) |

International career
| 1889–1901 | Ireland | 26 | (1) |
- * Club domestic league appearances and goals

Samuel Torrans (4 February 1869 – 8 May 1948) was an Irish footballer who mainly played as a left half. He spent his entire career with Linfield.

== Club career ==
Torrans spent his entire 16-year career playing for Linfield, where he won 6 Irish League titles and 7 Irish Cups.

== International career ==
Torrans would make his international debut with Ireland on 9 March 1889, in a 7–0 loss in a British Home Championship match against Scotland, held at Ibrox Park. On 5 March 1892, during a home match against England, in the 1891–92 British Home Championship, Ireland were awarded the first penalty kick in an international fixture. Torrans would be sent up to take the penalty; however, his shot would be saved by English goalkeeper Bill Rowley. In 1901, Torrans would end his career with Ireland, scoring 1 goal and earning 26 caps.

== Honours ==
- Irish League: 1890–91, 1891–92, 1892–93, 1894–95, 1897–98, 1901–02; runner-up: 1893–94, 1898–99, 1899–1900
- Irish Cup: 1890–91, 1891–92, 1892–93, 1894–95, 1897–98, 1898–99, 1901–02; runner-up: 1893–94
