= 1893 in association football =

The following are the association football events of the year 1893 throughout the world.

== Events ==
- July - Woolwich Arsenal, Liverpool and Newcastle United all admitted to the Football League
- September - Woolwich Arsenal return to the Manor Ground from their three-year stay at the Invicta Ground.

=== England ===
- Gillingham F.C.
- Headington (now Oxford United)
- Royal Ordnance Factories
- West Auckland Town F.C.
- Whitby Town F.C.

=== Germany ===
- VfB Stuttgart
- VfB Einheit zu Pankow
- 1. FC Lokomotive Leipzig

=== Italy ===
- Genoa C.F.C.

=== Portugal ===
- FC Porto

=== Scotland ===
- Dundee F.C.
- Elgin City F.C.
- Wick Academy F.C.

=== Switzerland ===
- FC Basel

== National League Champions ==
=== South America ===
Nation	Tournament	Winner	Runner-uo	Title
Argentina	Primera Division	Lomas	Flores	1st

=== Europe ===
Nation	Tournament	Winner	Runner-up	Title	Previous title won
Denmark	Football Tournament	Akademisk Boldklub	Kjøbenhavns Boldklub	2nd	1890
England	First Division	Sunderland	Preston North End	2nd	1892
Ireland	Football League	Linfield	Cliftonville	3rd	1892
Netherlands	Football League	Koninkiljke HFC	AVV RAP	2nd	1890
Scotland	First Division	Celtic	Rangers	1st	None

== Domestic Cups ==
=== Asia ===
Nation	Tournament	Winner	Score	Runner-up	Venue	Title	Previous title won
India	Durand Cup	Highland Light Infantry	2-1	Argyll & Sutherland Highlanders	Annadale	3rd	1890

Nation	Tournament	Winner	Score	Runner-up	Venue	Title	Previous title won
England	FA Cup	Wolverhampton Wanderers	1-0	Everton	Fallowfield Stadium	1st	None
Ireland	Irish Cup	Linfield	5-1	Cliftonville	Ulsterville	3rd	1892
Scotland	Scottish Cup	Queen's Park	2-1 (replay following voided 1-0 Celtic win)	Celtic	Ibrox Park	10th	1890
Wales	Welsh Cup	Wrexham	2-1	Chirk	Cricket Field	3rd	1883

== International tournaments ==
- 1893 British Home Championship (February 25 – April 8, 1893)
  - England

== Births ==
- 7 March: Luitpold Popp, German international footballer (died 1968)
