= 1902–03 Manchester United F.C. season =

English football club season

Manchester United
1902–03 season
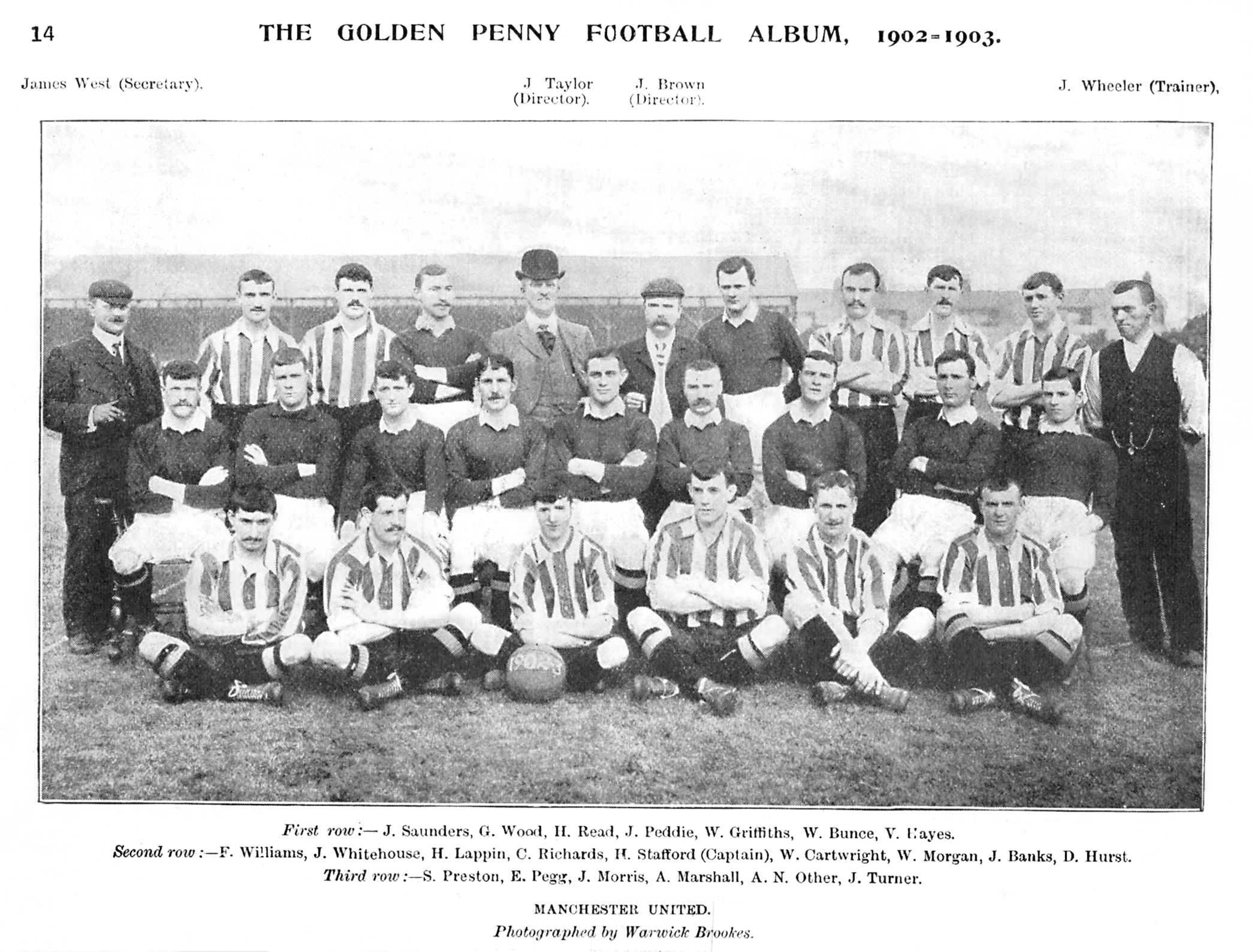
- The 1902–03 Manchester United squad. Half the players wear the home strip and half the away strip.
- Chairman: John Henry Davies
- Manager: James West
- Stadium: Bank Street Ground
- Second Division: 5th
- FA Cup: Second Round
- Top goalscorer: League: Jack Peddie (11); All: Jack Peddie (15)
- Highest home attendance: 40,000 vs Manchester City (25 December 1902)
- Lowest home attendance: 2,000 vs Stockport County (23 March 1903)
- Average home league attendance: 10,091
Home colours	Away colours

The 1902–03 season was Manchester United's 11th season in the Football League, and their first season under their new name of "Manchester United", as opposed to "Newton Heath".

== Second Division ==
Date	Opponents	H / A	Result F–A	Scorers	Attendance
6 September 1902	Gainsborough Trinity	A	1–0	Richards	4,000
13 September 1902	Burton United	H	1–0	Hurst	15,000
20 September 1902	Bristol City	A	1–3	Hurst	6,000
27 September 1902	Glossop	H	1–1	Hurst	12,000
4 October 1902	Chesterfield	H	2–1	Preston (2)	12,000
11 October 1902	Stockport County	A	1–2	Pegg	6,000
25 October 1902	Woolwich Arsenal	A	1–0	Beadsworth	12,000
8 November 1902	Lincoln City	A	3–1	Peddie (2), Hurst	3,000
15 November 1902	Small Heath	H	0–1		25,000
22 November 1902	Leicester Fosse	A	1–1	Downie	5,000
6 December 1902	Burnley	A	2–0	Pegg, Own goal	4,000
20 December 1902	Burslem Port Vale	A	1–1	Peddie	1,000
25 December 1902	Manchester City	H	1–1	Pegg	40,000
26 December 1902	Blackpool	H	2–2	Downie, Morrison	10,000
27 December 1902	Barnsley	H	2–1	Lappin, Peddie	9,000
3 January 1903	Gainsborough Trinity	H	3–1	Downie, Peddie, Pegg	8,000
10 January 1903	Burton United	A	1–3	Peddie	3,000
17 January 1903	Bristol City	H	1–2	Preston	12,000
24 January 1903	Glossop	A	3–1	Downie, Griffiths, Morrison	5,000
31 January 1903	Chesterfield	A	0–2		6,000
14 February 1903	Blackpool	A	0–2		3,000
28 February 1903	Doncaster Rovers	A	2–2	Morrison (2)	4,000
7 March 1903	Lincoln City	H	1–2	Downie	4,000
9 March 1903	Woolwich Arsenal	H	3–0	Arkesden, Peddie, Pegg	5,000
21 March 1903	Leicester Fosse	H	5–1	Fitchett, Griffiths, Morrison, Pegg, Smith	8,000
23 March 1903	Stockport County	H	0–0		2,000
30 March 1903	Preston North End	H	0–1		3,000
4 April 1903	Burnley	H	4–0	Peddie (2), Griffiths, Morrison	5,000
10 April 1903	Manchester City	A	2–0	Peddie, Schofield	30,000
11 April 1903	Preston North End	A	1–3	Pegg	7,000
13 April 1903	Doncaster Rovers	H	4–0	Arkesden, Bell, Griffiths, Morrison	6,000
18 April 1903	Burslem Port Vale	H	2–1	Schofield (2)	8,000
20 April 1903	Small Heath	A	1–2	Peddie	6,000
25 April 1903	Barnsley	A	0–0		2,000

Pos	Team	Pld	W	D	L	GF	GA	GAv	Pts
3	Woolwich Arsenal	34	20	8	6	66	30	2.200	48
4	Bristol City	34	17	8	9	59	38	1.553	42
5	Manchester United	34	15	8	11	53	38	1.395	38
6	Chesterfield Town	34	14	9	11	67	40	1.675	37
7	Preston North End	34	13	10	11	56	40	1.400	36

== FA Cup ==
Date	Round	Opponents	H / A	Result F–A	Scorers	Attendance
1 November 1902	Third Qualifying Round	Accrington Stanley	H	7–0	Williams (3), Morgan, Peddie, Pegg, Richards	6,000
13 November 1902	Fourth Qualifying Round	Oswaldtwistle Rovers	H	3–2	Beadsworth, Pegg, Williams	5,000
29 November 1902	Fifth Qualifying Round	Southport Central	H	4–1	Pegg (3), Banks	6,000
13 December 1902	Intermediate Round	Burton United	H	1–1	Griffiths	6,000
17 December 1902	Intermediate Round; Replay	Burton United	A	3–1	Peddie, Pegg, Schofield	7,000
7 February 1903	Round 1	Liverpool	H	2–1	Peddie (2)	15,000
21 February 1903	Round 2	Everton	A	1–3	Griffiths	15,000
