= 1891–92 County Antrim Shield =

Tournament details
- Country: Ireland
- Date: 14 November 1891 – 26 March 1892
- Teams: 12

Final positions
- Champions: Cliftonville (1st win)
- Runners-up: Lancashire Fusiliers

Tournament statistics
- Matches played: 11
- Goals scored: 98 (8.91 per match)

The 1891–92 County Antrim Shield was the 4th edition of the County Antrim Shield, a cup competition in Irish football.

Cliftonville won the tournament for the 1st time, defeating Lancashire Fusiliers 2–1 in the final.

== Results ==
=== First round ===
Team 1	Score	Team 2
Barn	6–4	YMCA
Cliftonville	w/o	Milltown
Cliftonville Olympic	3–0	Suffolk
Lancashire Fusiliers	11–1	Rifle Brigade
Ligoniel	14–0	Oldpark
Wesley	2–13	Distillery

==== Replay ====
Team 1	Score	Team 2
Oldpark	4–6^{1}	Ligoniel

- ^{1} The match was ordered to be replayed after a protest.

==== Second replay ====
Team 1	Score	Team 2
Ligoniel	8–5	Oldpark

=== Quarter-finals ===
Team 1	Score	Team 2
Cliftonville	w/o	Cliftonville Olympic
Distillery	3–5	Lancashire Fusiliers
Barn	bye	
Ligoniel	bye	

=== Semi-finals ===
Team 1	Score	Team 2
Cliftonville	2–1	Ligoniel
Lancashire Fusiliers	7–0	Barn

=== Final ===
26 March 1892

Cliftonville	2–1	Lancashire Fusiliers
McMaster; Small	Report	Burgoyne

Solitude, Belfast
