= Peter Rees =

Peter Rees may refer to:

- Peter Rees, Baron Rees (1926–2008), British politician
- Peter Rees (footballer) (born 1932), Welsh footballer
- Peter Rees (producer) (born 1966), American-Australian film and television producer
- Peter Rees (rugby union, born 1925) (1925–2020), Welsh rugby union player
- Peter Rees (rugby union, born 1937) (born 1937), Welsh rugby union player
- Peter Rees (murderer), British murderer
