= 1891–92 Irish Cup =

Tournament details
- Country: Ireland
- Date: 7 November 1891 – 12 March 1892
- Teams: 38

Final positions
- Champions: Linfield (2nd win)
- Runners-up: Black Watch

Tournament statistics
- Matches played: 34
- Goals scored: 230 (6.76 per match)

The 1891–92 Irish Cup was the 12th edition of the Irish Cup, the premier knock-out cup competition in Irish football.

Linfield won the tournament for the 2nd time and 2nd year in a row, defeating Black Watch (a British Army team) 7–0 in the final.

== Results ==
YMCA, Linfield, Glentoran, Ulster, Cliftonville, Oldpark, Milltown, Lancashire Fusiliers, Ligoniel, Distillery, St Columb's Court, and Limavady all given byes into the third round.

=== First round ===
Team 1	Score	Team 2
Kilrea	0–0	Coleraine YMCA
Limavady Reserves	w/o	Moyola Park
Omagh Wanderers	14–0	Newtownstewart
Sion Mills	3–3	Strabane
Ivy	7–0	St Columb's Court Wanderers
St Columb's Hall	4–0	Clooney Park
Rosemount	11–0	Young Ireland
St Columb's Swifts	0–2	Clooney Park Rovers
City Factory	w/o	Bright Stars
Glendermott	1–5	Londonderry Sentinel
Linfield Rangers	w/o	Distillery Rovers
Donacloney	4–1	Clarence
Black Watch	bye	
Milford	bye	

==== Replays ====
Team 1	Score	Team 2
Strabane	4–2	Sion Mills
Coleraine YMCA	4–2	Kilrea

=== Second round ===
Team 1	Score	Team 2
Coleraine YMCA	6–2	Limavady Reserves
Rosemount	5–2	St Columb's Hall
Ivy	w/o	Clooney Park Rovers
Bright Stars	2–1	Londonderry Sentinel
Omagh Wanderers	w/o	Strabane
Black Watch	w/o	Donacloney
Linfield Rangers	5–2	Milford

=== Third round ===
Team 1	Score	Team 2
Ligoniel	3–5	Glentoran
Oldpark	1–7	Lancashire Fusiliers
Cliftonville	1–1	YMCA
Ulster	16–0	Milltown
Distillery	3–6	Linfield
Black Watch	5–2	Linfield Rangers
St Columb's Court	5–2	Limavady
Omagh Wanderers	3–2	Bright Stars
Coleraine YMCA	1–2	Ivy
Rosemount	bye	

==== Replay ====
Team 1	Score	Team 2
Cliftonville	6–3	YMCA

=== Fourth round ===
Team 1	Score	Team 2
Black Watch	8–2	Lancashire Fusiliers
Linfield	6–0	Glentoran
Ulster	4–2	Cliftonville
Omagh Wanderers	2–4	Rosemount
St Columb's Court	9–0	Ivy

=== Fifth round ===
Team 1	Score	Team 2
St Columb's Court	9–3	Rosemount
Ulster	bye	
Linfield	bye	
Black Watch	bye	

=== Semi-finals ===
Team 1	Score	Team 2
Black Watch	4–1	St Columb's Court
Linfield	3–0	Ulster

=== Final ===
12 March 1892

Linfield	7–0	Black Watch
Hill; S Torrans; R Torrans; Dalton	Report

Solitude, Belfast
