= 1892–93 Irish League =

Irish League
- Season: 1892–93
- Dates: 3 September 1892 – 3 April 1893
- Champions: Linfield; 3rd Irish title
- Matches: 26
- Goals: 116 (4.46 per match)
- Top goalscorer: Robert Hill; James Percy (9 goals each)
- Biggest home win: Cliftonville 8–1 Derry Olympic; Distillery 7–0 Ulster
- Biggest away win: Derry Olympic 0–9 Distillery
- Highest scoring: Cliftonville 8–1 Derry Olympic; Derry Olympic 0–9 Distillery

The 1892–93 Irish League was the 3rd edition of the Irish League, the highest level of league competition in Irish football.

The league comprised six teams, a reduction from the ten of the previous season. Linfield won the championship for the third year in a row.

== Season summary ==
The number of teams reduced from ten the previous season to six for this season. Lancashire Fusiliers withdrew before this season began, while YMCA and Oldpark had withdrew before the previous season finished. Ligoniel and Milltown were excluded from the league for this season, while Derry Olympic were elected.

== Teams and locations ==
Location of teams in the 1892–93 Irish League
Location of the Belfast teams in the 1892–93 Irish League

Team	Town	Home Ground
Cliftonville	Belfast	Solitude
Derry Olympic	Derry	Brandywell Road
Distillery	Belfast	Grosvenor Park
Glentoran	Belfast	The Oval
Linfield	Belfast	Ulsterville
Ulster	Belfast	Ulster Cricket Ground

== League standings ==
Pos	Team	Pld	W	D	L	GF	GA	GR	Pts	Result
1	Linfield (C)	10	8	2	0	27	7	3.857	18	Champions
2	Cliftonville	10	7	1	2	28	18	1.556	15	
3	Distillery	10	5	2	3	31	18	1.722	12	
4	Glentoran	10	4	0	6	13	17	0.765	8	
5	Ulster	10	3	0	7	10	30	0.333	6	
6	Derry Olympic (Note: Derry Olympic resigned from the league after six league games; their remaining fixtures were awarded to their opponents with a 0–0 scoreline being registered.)	10	0	1	9	7	26	0.269	1	Withdrew

Source: Irish League Archive
(C) Champions

== Results ==
Home \ Away	CLI	DOL	DIS	GLT	LIN	ULS
Cliftonville		8–1	3–2	3–1	0–3	1–0
Derry Olympic	1–2		0–9	1–2	– (Note: Derry Olympic withdrew after six games. The remaining four matches were scored with a goalless victory for the opponents.)	2–3
Distillery	5–3	2–2		1–4	1–1	7–0
Glentoran	1–2	–	0–1		0–5	3–0
Linfield	3–3	–	3–0	2–1		3–1
Ulster	1–3	–	2–3	2–1	1–7	

Source: Irish League Archive
Legend: Blue = home team win; Yellow = draw; Red = away team win.
