= McKeag =

McKeag is a surname. Notable people with the surname include:

- Anna Jane McKeag (1864–1947), American psychologist and college president
- Billy McKeag (born 1945), Northern Irish footballer
- Gordon McKeag (1928–2005), English solicitor and sports executive
- Stephen McKeag (1970–2000), Northern Irish loyalist
- William McKeag (1897–1972), British politician, soldier and solicitor
- William John McKeag (1928–2007), Canadian politician
