= Wales national amateur football team =

Team formed in 1908 and disbanded in 1974

Wales Amateurs
- Association: Football Association of Wales
- Most caps: Gilbert Lloyd (32)
- Top scorer: Graham Davies, Idwal Davies, Jack Nicholls (5)
- FIFA code: WAL
| First colours | Second colours |

First international
- England Amateurs 1–0 Wales Amateurs (Edgeley Park, Stockport; 22 February 1908)

Biggest win
- Scotland Amateurs 1–5 Wales Amateurs (Tynecastle Park, Edinburgh; 2 April 1932)

Biggest defeat
- Wales Amateurs 0–9 England Amateurs (Penydarren Park, Merthyr Tydfil; 24 January 1920)

The Wales national amateur football team was the amateur representative team for Wales at football. It was formed in 1908 and continued until 1974.

== History ==
The Wales amateur national team played the majority of its fixtures versus the amateur representative teams of the other four Home Nations – England, Scotland, Northern Ireland and the Republic of Ireland. It had a losing record against each nation and won the British Amateur Championship on two occasions, outright in 1967–68 and jointly in 1973–74. The team fared better in its matches against overseas opposition, winning its three matches versus Norwegian and South African representative teams, winning and drawing versus India, but losing on both occasions to the Netherlands.

Squads were predominantly composed of players from Welsh domestic league clubs such as Lovell's Athletic, Cardiff Corinthians, Bridgend Town, Bangor City, Llanelli and Porthmadog. Players playing on amateur terms with clubs in the English Football League were also selected, such as future full international Phil Woosnam.

The team's first fixture was a friendly match played versus England at Edgeley Park on 22 February 1908, with England's Vivian Woodward scoring the only goal of the game. Thereafter the entirety of the team's fixtures took place against England until a friendly match versus South Africa in October 1924. The team won its first match on 22 January 1921, when the Welsh beat England 2–0 at Molineux. The team was disbanded in 1974, when the FA abolished the distinction between amateurism and professionalism in domestic football.

== Venues ==
The team predominantly played its home matches at Farrar Road Stadium (Bangor), Vetch Field (Swansea) and Smithfield Athletic Ground (Aberystwyth).

== Records ==
=== Most appearances ===
| # | Name | Position | Years | Appearances | Goals |
|---|---|---|---|---|---|
| 1 | Gilbert Lloyd | WH/FW | 1962–1973 | 32 | 3 |
| 2 | George Renton | WH | 1965–1972 | 27 | 0 |
| 3 | Arthur Evans | WH | 1950–1959 | 26 | 0 |
| 4 | Glyn Owen | WH | 1953–1961 | 20 | 1 |
| 5 | Alan Phillips | WH | 1967–1973 | 19 | 0 |
| 6 | Trefor Owen | CH | 1952–1958 | 17 | 0 |
| 7 | Brinley Powell | FB | 1960–1967 | 16 | 0 |
| 8 | Peter Rees | OF | 1952–1958 | 16 | 3 |
| 9 | David McCarter | FW | 1962–1967 | 15 | 1 |
| 10 | Phil Woosnam | FW | 1952–1957 | 15 | 4 |

=== Most goals ===
| # | Name | Position | Years | Goals (Note: 9 players finished their amateur international careers with 3 goals – G. Davies, K. Davies, L.O. Davies, M. Griffiths, Phil Holme, Sam Jones, Gilbert Lloyd, Peter Rees and T. Reynolds.) | Appearances |
|---|---|---|---|---|---|
| 1 | Graham Davies | FW | 1960–1962 | 5 | 4 |
| 2 | Idwal Davies | CF | 1921–1926 | 5 | 7 |
| 3 | Jack Nicholls | IR | 1923–1930 | 5 | 10 |
| 4 | K. E. Fitzgerald | FW | 1960–1964 | 4 | 5 |
| 5 | Graham Reynolds | CF | 1958–1965 | 4 | 12 |
| 6 | Geoff Anthony | OF | 1966–1974 | 4 | 13 |
| 7 | Phil Woosnam | FW | 1952–1957 | 4 | 15 |

== Honours ==
- British Amateur Championship winners: 1967–68 (shared on one occasion)
