= James McCleary =

James McCleary may refer to:

- James McCleary (politician) (1853–1924), American politician in Minnesota
- Ernie McCleary (James Warren McCleary, c. 1923–2012), Northern Irish footballer

== See also ==
- James McCleery (1837–1871), Union Army officer and U.S. Representative from Louisiana
- James MacCleary, British Member of Parliament
