= George Sheehan =

George Sheehan may refer to:

- George A. Sheehan (1918–1993), writer about the sport of running
- George Sheehan (footballer), Irish soccer player during the 1890s and early 20th century
