= Milltown F.C. =

Former association football club in Belfast

- Full name: Milltown Football Club
- Founded: 1886
- Dissolved: 1897
- Ground: Falls Park (1886–1888); Milltown (1888–1897)
- League: Irish Football League
Home colours

Milltown Football Club is a former Irish football club based in Belfast.

== History ==
It was founded in 1886 and was a founding member of the Irish Junior League in 1890, before it joined the Irish Football League for the 1891–92 season. As a League member, it was exempted to the third round of the Irish Cup, but was hammered 16–0 by Ulster in its first tie.

The club was excluded for the 1892–93 season as the League was reduced to six members. It rejoined the Junior League, and enjoyed its greatest honour by beating the Glentoran second XI to win the Irish Intermediate Cup in 1895–96, despite the side being struck by a bout of influenza. However, despite a support that was larger in number than that of some of the senior clubs, the club folded during the 1896–97 season.

== Colours ==
The team originally wore green shirts, which changed to green and white in 1892, and green and red in 1896.

== Ground ==
The club originally played at Falls Park.

== Honours ==
=== Intermediate honours ===
- Irish Intermediate Cup: 1
  - 1894–95
