= Phil Holme =

Welsh footballer

Personal information
- Full name: Philip Charles Holme
- Date of birth: 21 June 1947 (age 79)
- Place of birth: Briton Ferry, Wales
- Position: Forward

Senior career*
Years	Team	Apps	(Gls)
–1967	Cardiff City		
1967–1971	Bridgend Town		
1971–1972	Swansea City	23	(5)
1972–1974	Hull City	38	(11)

International career
1969–1971	Wales Amateurs	3	(0)

Managerial career
- 1999: Inter Cardiff
- * Club domestic league appearances and goals

Philip Charles Holme (born 21 June 1947) was a Welsh amateur footballer who played as a forward in the Football League for Hull City and Swansea City. He was capped by Wales at amateur level. After retiring as a player due to injury in 1974, he became a manager and coach.

== Personal life ==
Holme has worked as an electrician

== Career statistics ==
Appearances and goals by club, season and competition
Club	Season	League			FA Cup		League Cup		Total	
Club	Season	Division	Apps	Goals	Apps	Goals	Apps	Goals	Apps	Goals
Hull City	1972–73	Second Division	32	11	4	0	1	1	37	12
Hull City	1973–74	Second Division	6	0	2	0	1	2	9	2
Career total			38	11	6	0	2	3	46	14
