= 1901–02 Irish League =

Irish League
- Season: 1901–02
- Dates: 31 August 1901 – 14 December 1901
- Champions: Linfield; 6th Irish title
- Matches played: 56
- Goals scored: 223 (3.98 per match)
- Biggest home win: Derry Celtic 7–1 St Columb's Court; Glentoran 7–1 St Columb's Court
- Biggest away win: St Columb's Court 2–10 Distillery
- Highest scoring: St Columb's Court 2–10 Distillery

The 1901–02 Irish League was the 12th edition of the Irish League, the highest level of league competition in Irish football.

The league comprised eight teams, and Linfield won the championship for the 6th time.

== Season summary ==
For this season, two new clubs (St Columb's Court and Ulster) were elected to the league. St Columb's Court were making their first appearance in the league while for Ulster it was their first season in the league since 1893–94. The eight-team league was the largest the league had been since 1891–92.

== Teams and locations ==
Location of teams in the 1901–02 Irish League
Location of Belfast teams in the 1901–02 Irish League

Team	Town	Home Ground
Belfast Celtic	Belfast	Celtic Park
Cliftonville	Belfast	Solitude
Derry Celtic	Derry	Brandywell
Distillery	Belfast	Grosvenor Park
Glentoran	Belfast	The Oval
Linfield	Belfast	Balmoral
St Columb's Court	Derry	Brandywell
Ulster	Belfast	Ulster Cricket Ground

== League standings ==
Pos	Team	Pld	W	D	L	GF	GA	GR	Pts	Result
1	Linfield (C)	14	12	0	2	38	10	3.800	24	Champions
2	Glentoran	14	10	1	3	43	22	1.955	21	
3	Distillery	14	8	3	3	38	20	1.900	19	
4	Cliftonville	14	7	2	5	24	14	1.714	16	
5	Belfast Celtic	14	4	4	6	22	25	0.880	12	
6	Derry Celtic	14	5	2	7	23	26	0.885	12	
7	Ulster	14	2	3	9	22	44	0.500	7	
8	St Columb's Court	14	0	1	13	13	62	0.210	1	Withdrew

Source: rsssf.com
(C) Champions

== Results ==
Home \ Away	BCE	CLI	DCE	DIS	GLT	LIN	SCC	ULS
Belfast Celtic		0–0	2–1	0–0	1–3	0–3	4–0	6–1
Cliftonville	2–0		1–0	1–2	1–2	3–0	3–0	1–0
Derry Celtic	3–2	2–0		1–1	2–1	0–1	7–1	1–2
Distillery	1–1	2–1	5–1		1–2	2–1	4–1	5–1
Glentoran	4–0	3–3	4–1	3–1		0–2	7–1	5–2
Linfield	4–0	2–0	4–0	2–0	5–1		3–0	4–2
St Columb's Court	2–5	1–5	0–2	2–10	0–4	1–3		3–4
Ulster	1–1	0–3	2–2	3–4	2–4	1–4	1–1	

Source: Irish League Archive
Legend: Blue = home team win; Yellow = draw; Red = away team win.
