= Tommy Morrison (footballer, born 1874) =

Irish footballer (1874–1940)

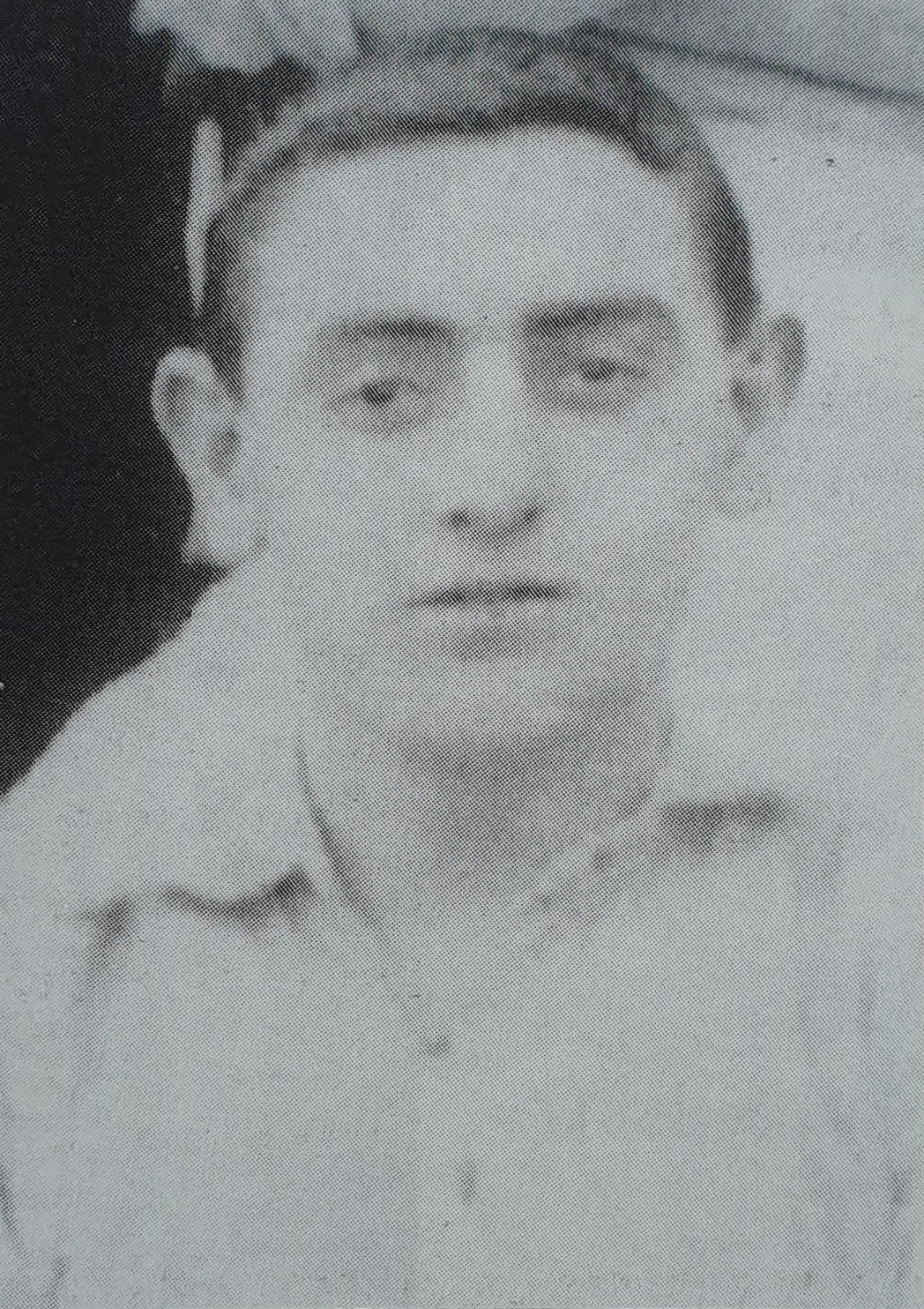

Personal information
- Date of birth: 16 December 1874
- Place of birth: Belfast, Ireland
- Date of death: 26 March 1940 (aged 65)
- Positions: Outside right; inside right

Senior career*
Years	Team	Apps	(Gls)
1891–1894	Glentoran	26	(17)
1894–1895	Burnley	7	(1)
1894–1895	Glentoran	6	(3)
1895–1897	Celtic	15	(2)
1897–1902	Burnley	171	(25)
1902–1904	Manchester United	29	(7)
1904–1906	Colne	?	(?)
1906–1907	Burnley	1	(0)
1907–1908	Glentoran	10	(2)

International career
1894–1895	Irish League XI	2	(1)
1895–1902	Ireland	7	(0)
- * Club domestic league appearances and goals

Thomas Morrison (16 December 1874 – 26 March 1940), also known as Ching Morrison, was a footballer for Glentoran, Burnley, Celtic and Manchester United, and for the Ireland national team.

== Club career ==
Morrison made his first appearance for Glentoran on 18 April 1891, in a Charity Cup game against Ulster at Solitude. He scored in that match which was abandoned with the Glens trailing 4–1. The following season (1891–92) saw Morrison score 11 goals in just nine games, including a hat-trick in the Irish League against Ligoniel. Two seasons later, he was part of Glentoran's Irish-League winning side before moving to English football.

Morrison transferred to Burnley in March 1894 and made his debut in a game on 10 March against Derby County; he scored one goal in a 3–1 victory. Early the following season he was dismissed by the Burnley committee for misconduct.

Morrison had another spell with Glentoran and a largely unsuccessful stint with Celtic in Scotland. He is credited by the club's manager Willie Maley with being the first native Irishman to play for Celtic, meaning that a Protestant from East Belfast was the first Irish signing for a club with an overwhelmingly Catholic Irish reputation. He won the Glasgow Merchants Charity Cup soon after arriving in 1895, scoring in the win over Rangers in the final, and played a small part in helping the Bhoys win the 1896 Scottish Football League championship with five appearances, but made only eight more over the next seven months.

Morrison returned to Burnley in February 1897. The following season, he helped them to the Second Division title in 1898. He remained at Burnley until the 1902–03 season when he signed for Manchester United. He gained the distinction of being Manchester United's first Irish player, although fellow Ulsterman Jack Peden had spent a season playing for United's predecessors Newton Heath during the previous decade.

Morrison spent only one full season at Bank Street in the Second Division but did leave an impression with the fans by scoring the first goal in a memorable 2–1 FA Cup upset of top-division Notts County in February 1904. Morrison remained at Manchester United until the beginning of the 1904–05 season when he signed for Colne. He later returned home to Belfast to end his career with Glentoran, scoring two goals in 16 appearances in 1906–07.

== International career ==
Morrison made his debut for Ireland in March 1895. Ireland lost the game 9–0 to England in Derby. All seven of Morrison's Ireland caps came in Home International Championship games. His last cap came on 22 March 1902, in a 1–0 defeat to England in Belfast.

== Personal life ==
Morrison was the youngest of five sons born to James Morrison and Annie (née McMillan). The first three boys were born in Scotland and the youngest of them, Bob, was also an Ireland international who played for Linfield at club level. Another brother, Alex, also played for Glentoran in the 1890s.
