= British Home Amateur Championship =

- Founded: 1953
- Abolished: 1974
- Region: British Isles
- Number of teams: 4
- Last champions: England / Wales (Note: The Scotland versus Northern Ireland match, on 1974-02-01, was postponed due to an unplayable pitch. The match was never rearranged. If Scotland had won it they would have finished joint first with England and Wales.)
- Most successful team(s): England (16 titles)

The British Home Amateur Championship or British Amateur Championship was an annual football competition contested between the United Kingdom's four amateur national teams: England, Scotland, Wales and Northern Ireland (the last of whom competed as Ireland for the first three tournaments). Starting during the 1953–54 season, it was contested until the 1973–74 season, after which the Football Association abolished the amateur distinction. From 1929 to 1953, an unofficial winner was declared by the press; during this time, Ireland and Wales did not meet regularly.

== List of winners ==
| Year | Champions | Second | Third | Fourth |
|---|---|---|---|---|
| 1953–54 | Ireland (1) | Scotland | England | Wales |
| 1954–55 | England (1) | Ireland | Scotland | Wales |
| 1955–56 | England (2) / Ireland (2) (Note: Where teams finished in a joint position, the level teams are listed in order of better/best goal difference.) | | Wales | Scotland |
| 1956–57 | England (3) | Wales | Northern Ireland / Scotland | |
| 1957–58 | England (4) / Scotland (1) / Northern Ireland (3) | | | Wales |
| 1958–59 | England (5) / Scotland (2) | | Northern Ireland | Wales |
| 1959–60 | England (6) | Scotland / Northern Ireland | | Wales |
| 1960–61 | England (7) | Scotland / Wales | | Northern Ireland |
| 1961–62 | Scotland (3) | England / Northern Ireland | | Wales |
| 1962–63 | England (8) | Northern Ireland | Wales | Scotland |
| 1963–64 | Northern Ireland (4) | England / Scotland | | Wales |
| 1964–65 | England (9) / Scotland (4) | | Northern Ireland | Wales |
| 1965–66 | England (10) | Scotland / Northern Ireland | | Wales |
| 1966–67 | England (11) | Scotland | Wales | Northern Ireland |
| 1967–68 | Wales (1) | England | Northern Ireland / Scotland | |
| 1968–69 | England (12) | Wales | Scotland | Northern Ireland |
| 1969–70 | England (13) | Wales / Scotland / Northern Ireland | | |
| 1970–71 | England (14) | Wales | Northern Ireland / Scotland | |
| 1971–72 | Northern Ireland (5) | England / Wales | | Scotland |
| 1972–73 | England (15) | Scotland | Wales | Northern Ireland |
| 1973–74 | England (16) / Wales (2) | | Scotland | Northern Ireland |

=== Total wins ===
| Team | Wins total | Wins outright | Shared wins |
|---|---|---|---|
| England | 16 | 11 | 5 |
| Ireland / Northern Ireland | 5 | 3 | 2 |
| Scotland | 4 | 1 | 3 |
| Wales | 2 | 1 | 1 |

== See also ==
- British Home Championship
- Four Nations Tournament
