= Bill McCracken =

Northern Irish footballer (1883–1979)

Personal information
- Full name: William McCracken
- Date of birth: 29 January 1883
- Place of birth: Belfast, Northern Ireland
- Date of death: 20 January 1979 (aged 95)
- Place of death: Kingston upon Hull, England
- Height: 5 ft 9 in (1.75 m)
- Position: Defender

Senior career*
Years	Team	Apps	(Gls)
1900–1904	Distillery		
1904–1923	Newcastle United	377	(6)

International career
1902–1923	Ireland (IFA)	16	(1)
1902–1903	Irish League XI	2	(0)
1918	England (wartime)	2	(0)
1919	Ireland (wartime)	2	(0)

Managerial career
- 1923–1931: Hull City
- 1932–1933: Gateshead
- 1933–1936: Millwall
- 1937–1950: Aldershot
- * Club domestic league appearances and goals

William Robert McCracken (29 January 1883 – 20 January 1979) was an Irish footballer who played as a defender. He is famous for inventing the offside trap. He was a cousin of Robert McCracken who also had a career as a professional footballer.

== Playing career ==
During his career, McCracken captained both English club Newcastle United and the Ireland national side. He played for Newcastle from 1904 to 1924, helping them win three Football League titles and one FA Cup. In total he played 432 games for the Magpies, scoring eight goals.

McCracken gained sixteen international caps (including one match against Scotland in 1902 which is not counted as official by the Scots due to its unusual circumstances as a fundraiser following the Ibrox disaster, but excluding two 'Victory matches' in 1919 against the same opposition), scoring one goal. During World War I he helped to arrange two fundraising matches featuring top players and turned out for the England XI in both, facing Ireland on the second occasion. His Ireland teammates included Archie Goodall, Billy Scott, Jack Kirwan and Robert Milne.

McCracken is one of just a few players whose actions have brought changes to the Laws of the Game when, as a right full back at Newcastle, he masterminded the technique of making opposition forwards ruled "offside" when the rules stated that three defenders must be between the attacking player and the goal line. So successful was McCracken's defensive ploy that the Offside Law was changed to "two defenders" between the foremost attacker and the goal line". Illustrious Italian coach Vittorio Pozzo, who had personally seen him play, praised McCracken, in his own words, as the 'master of fuori-giuoco (offside)'. According to Pozzo he even wrote a booklet to explain his "offside trick".

== Managerial career ==
After leaving Newcastle he went on to become Hull City manager in 1923, and he took them to the FA Cup semi-final in 1930. He left the club a year later.

He later had a short term in charge of Gateshead, before managing Millwall from 1933 to 1936. He went on to manage the now defunct Aldershot, and later returned to Newcastle as a scout. In the 1970s, with McCracken in his 90s, he was scouting for Watford.

== Honours ==
=== As a player ===
Distillery

- Irish Football League: 1902–03
- Irish Cup: 1903; runner-up: 1902

Newcastle United

- Football League: 1904–05, 1906–07, 1908–09
- FA Cup: 1910; runner-up: 1908, 1911
