= William Sherrard =

Irish association football player

Personal information
- Date of birth: 25 August 1872
- Place of birth: Limavady, Ireland
- Date of death: 9 October 1895 (aged 23)
- Place of death: Belfast, Ireland
- Position: Inside forward

Senior career*
| Years | Team | Apps | (Gls) |
| 1889–1894 | Limavady | | |
| | → Derry Olympic (Guest) | 6 | (0) |
| 1894 | Glentoran | | (5) |
| 1894–1896 | Cliftonville | | (11) |

International career
| 1895 | Ireland Amateurs | 3 | (2) |
- * Club domestic league appearances and goals

William Sherrard (25 August 1872 – 9 October 1895), familiarly known as Beg, was an Irish international footballer who played for Limavady, Glentoran and Cliftonville.

The youngest of 12 children, Sherrard's older brother Joe Sherrard would also play for Ireland.

== Club career ==
Sherrard began playing football with his local club, Limavady, alongside older brothers Joe and Jack and won the North West Cup on three occasions, scoring twice in five cup final appearances. After playing briefly as a guest for Derry Olympic, Sherrard moved to Glentoran in September 1894, scoring five goals before moving to Cliftonville in November.

Sherrard scored five times for Cliftonville during the remainder of the 1894/95 season, and would also appear in the final of the Belfast Charity Cup for his new side, a match which Cliftonville lost 3–1 to Linfield. He started the following season in good form, scoring six goals before his death in October 1895.

== International career ==
Sherrard made his Ireland debut against England in the opening match of the 1894–95 British Home Championship, a game Ireland would lose 9–0. He retained his place for the next match, scoring in a 2–2 draw against Wales and also scored the consolation goal in a 3–1 defeat to Scotland.

== Death and funeral ==
Sherrard died at the age of 23 from influenza whilst staying with his sister, Tilly Oliver, on 9 October 1895. His funeral was reportedly attended by over 2,000 mourners.
