= Maurice McVeigh =

Northern Irish footballer

Senior career*
Years	Team	Apps	(Gls)
?–1948	Distillery		
1948–?	Glenavon		

International career
1950–1958	Northern Ireland Amateurs	13	(1)
- * Club domestic league appearances and goals

Maurice McVeigh was a footballer from Northern Ireland who played with Glenavon from 1948. Nicknamed "Twinkle Toes", he was a member of Glenavon's first-ever Irish League championship teams. A shipyard worker from Belfast, he won 11 amateur international caps for Northern Ireland and one inter-league cap for the Irish League. He was the Ulster Footballer of the Year for the 1954–55 season.
