= 1893–94 Irish League =

Irish League
- Season: 1893–94
- Dates: 2 September 1893 – 4 May 1894
- Champions: Glentoran; 1st Irish title
- Matches: 30
- Goals: 146 (4.87 per match)
- Top goalscorer: Michael McErlean (9 goals)
- Biggest home win: Glentoran 8–0 Cliftonville
- Biggest away win: Ligoniel 0–6 Distillery
- Highest scoring: Distillery 4–4 Linfield; Glentoran 8–0 Cliftonville

The 1893–94 Irish League was the 4th edition of the Irish League, the highest level of league competition in Irish football.

The league comprised six teams, and Glentoran won the championship for the first time.

== Season summary ==
After the withdrawal of Derry Olympic the previous season, Ligoniel (who had last played in the 1891–92 season) were elected in their place, meaning all league games were played in Belfast.

== Teams and locations ==
Location of teams in the 1893–94 Irish League; all matches were played in Belfast

Team	Town	Home Ground
Cliftonville	Belfast	Solitude
Distillery	Belfast	Grosvenor Park
Glentoran	Belfast	The Oval
Ligoniel	Belfast	Ligoniel
Linfield	Belfast	Ulsterville
Ulster	Belfast	Ulster Cricket Ground

== League standings ==
Pos	Team	Pld	W	D	L	GF	GA	GR	Pts	Result
1	Glentoran (C)	10	8	0	2	31	10	3.100	16	Champions
2	Linfield	10	6	2	2	36	15	2.400	14	
3	Cliftonville	10	4	2	4	22	25	0.880	10	
4	Distillery	10	4	1	5	23	24	0.958	9	
5	Ulster	10	4	0	6	23	33	0.697	8	Withdrew
6	Ligoniel	10	1	1	8	10	38	0.263	3	Withdrew

Source: rsssf.com
(C) Champions

== Results ==
Home \ Away	CLI	DIS	GLT	LIG	LIN	ULS
Cliftonville		3–2	0–1	2–2	3–1	1–3
Distillery	2–1		1–0	1–2	4–4	2–0
Glentoran	8–0	4–2		5–1	1–3	5–1
Ligoniel	1–5	0–6	0–2		0–5	3–4
Linfield	3–3	6–0	0–1	4–0		5–2
Ulster	2–4	4–3	2–4	4–1	1–5	

Source: Irish League Archive
Legend: Blue = home team win; Yellow = draw; Red = away team win.
