= Donald Morrogh =

Irish footballer

Donald Morrogh was an Irish soccer player during the 1890s.

He played for the amateur Bohemians during these times alongside the likes of Robert Murray, Oliver St. John Gogarty and the Sheehan brothers, George and Willie. Donald won one full international caps for the Ireland team, in 1896.

Morrogh also played a part in Bohemians' 6 Leinster Senior Cup final victories in a row during the 1890s.

== Honours ==
- Leinster Senior Cup
  - Bohemians 1894, 1895, 1896
