= Northern Ireland national amateur football team =

Northern Ireland Amateurs
- Association: Irish Football Association
- Most caps: Bertie Fulton (21)
- Top scorer: Hugh Barr, Kevin McGarry (11)
- FIFA code: NIR
| First colours | Second colours |

First international
- Ireland Amateurs 1–2 England Amateurs (Dalymount Park, Dublin; 15 December 1906)

Biggest win
- Ireland Amateurs 5–1 England Amateurs (Solitude, Belfast; 13 February 1937)

Biggest defeat
- Scotland Amateurs 6–0 Ireland Amateurs (Celtic Park, Glasgow; 28 January 1933)

The Northern Ireland national amateur football team was the amateur representative team for Northern Ireland at football. It was formed in 1906 and continued until 1974.

== History ==
The Northern Ireland amateur national team played the majority of its fixtures versus the amateur representative teams of the other Home Nations – England, Scotland and Wales. The team had a winning record against each of the other Home Nations except England. The team initially represented the whole of Ireland, until the partition of Ireland in 1921. No matches were played against the Republic of Ireland amateur team. Occasional matches were played against representative teams (Great Britain, Irish League XI) and the team played three matches against non-Home Nations opposition – France, Gold Coast and South Africa. Northern Ireland won the British Amateur Championship on six occasions, in 1948-49 (unofficial, joint with Scotland), in 1953–54, in 1955-56 (joint with England), in 1957-58 (joint with England and Scotland), 1963–64 and 1971–72.

The team's first fixture was a friendly match played versus England at Dalymount Park on 15 December 1906. Ireland's Frank Thompson opened the scoring after six minutes, but quick goals from Harold Hardman and Freddie Wheatcroft saw England win the match 2–1. Aside from a friendly match versus France in 1921, England would be Northern Ireland's sole opponents until 1929, when an annual match with Scotland was first contested. Northern Ireland registered its first win on 19 November 1910, with James Macauley, Dinny Hannon and Johnny McDonnell scoring the goals to complete a 3–2 win over England at Solitude. The team was disbanded in 1974, when the FA abolished the distinction between amateurism and professionalism in domestic football. The majority of the team's players played their domestic football in the Irish League for Cliftonville, with Linfield, Glenavon, Coleraine and Distillery also contributing a large number of players.

== Venues ==
The team predominantly played its home matches at Solitude (Belfast). Other frequent venues included The Showgrounds (Coleraine), Ballymena Showgrounds and The Oval (Belfast).

== Records ==
=== Most appearances ===
| # | Name | Position | Years | Appearances (Note: Four players finished their amateur international careers with 11 appearances – Bobby Brolly, Hugh Cunningham, Sammy Magee and Billy McCullough.) | Goals |
|---|---|---|---|---|---|
| 1 | Bertie Fulton | LB | 1925–1939 | 21 | 1 |
| 2 | Ernie McCleary | CH | 1948–1956 | 15 | 0 |
| 3 | Kevin McGarry | IF | 1948–1956 | 15 | 11 |
| 4 | Hugh Barr | FW | 1957–1962 | 14 | 11 |
| 5 | Billy Johnston | IF | 1961–1966 | 13 | 3 |
| 6 | Maurice McVeigh | OL | 1949–1957 | 13 | 1 |
| 7 | Frank Montgomery | RB | 1951–1955 | 13 | 0 |
| 8 | Jackie Davis | LB | 1953–1956 | 12 | 0 |
| 9 | Joe Patterson | RB | 1964–1969 | 12 | 0 |

=== Most goals ===
| # | Name | Position | Years | Goals (Note: Eight players finished their amateur international careers with 3 goals – Jimmy Gibb, Billy Johnston, Harry McCracken, Johnny McDonnell, Jimmy Millar, Sammy Pavis, Phil Scott and Jimmy Shields.) | Appearances |
|---|---|---|---|---|---|
| 1 | Hugh Barr | FW | 1957–1962 | 11 | 14 |
| 2 | Kevin McGarry | IF | 1948–1956 | 11 | 15 |
| 3 | Dennis Guy | CF | 1965–1969 | 5 | 8 |
| 4 | Hugh Cunningham | OL | 1948–1954 | 5 | 11 |
| 5 | Boy Martin | CF | 1931–1933 | 4 | 4 |
| 6 | Paddy Hasty | CF | 1955–1961 | 4 | 5 |
| 7 | Dennis Kelleher | FW | 1938–1950 | 4 | 8 |

=== Honours ===
- British Amateur Championship winners (3): 1953–54, 1963–64, 1971–72 (additionally shared on three other occasions)
