= 1892–93 Irish Cup =

Tournament details
- Country: Ireland
- Date: 5 November 1892 – 11 March 1893
- Teams: 30

Final positions
- Champions: Linfield (3rd win)
- Runners-up: Cliftonville

Tournament statistics
- Matches played: 18
- Goals scored: 89 (4.94 per match)

The 1892–93 Irish Cup was the 13th edition of the Irish Cup, the premier knock-out cup competition in Irish football.

Linfield won the tournament for the 3rd time and 3rd year in a row, defeating Cliftonville 5–1 in the final.

== Results ==
Linfield, Distillery, Ulster, Glentoran, St Columb's Court, Limavady, Derry Olympic, Leinster Nomads and Cliftonville all given byes into the third round.

=== First round ===
Team 1	Score	Team 2
Moyola Park	3–2	Coleraine YMCA
Strabane	2–1	Royal Inniskilling Fusiliers
Fintona	w/o	Sion Mills
Clooney Park	w/o	Bright Stars
St Columb's Court Wanderers	w/o	St Columb's Court Swifts
Young Ireland	w/o	St Columb's Hall
Ivy	w/o	Londonderry Sentinel
Milford	w/o	Newry Wanderers
Linfield Rangers	w/o	Donacloney
Kilrea	bye	
Rosemount	bye	
Distillery Rovers	bye	

=== Second round ===
Team 1	Score	Team 2
Kilrea	w/o	Moyola Park
Fintona	2–1	Strabane
St Columb's Court Wanderers	w/o	Clooney Park
St Columb's Hall	0–5	Rosemount
Distillery Rovers	w/o	Donacloney
Ivy	bye	
Milford	bye	

=== Third round ===
Team 1	Score	Team 2
Milford	1–4	Limavady
Moyola Park	1–4	Leinster Nomads
Derry Olympic	w/o	Clooney Park
Cliftonville	1–0	St Columb's Court
Distillery	w/o	Fintona
Rosemount	4–1^{1}	Ulster
Glentoran	1–6	Linfield
Ivy	2–1	Donacloney

- ^{1} Ulster protested after the match that Rosemount's ground did not provide sufficient protection to the players from spectators. The match was ordered to be replayed at Ulster's ground, but Rosemount refused to play feeling they had been harshly treated. Ulster therefore advanced into the next round.

=== Fourth round ===
Team 1	Score	Team 2
Clooney Park	2–2	Ivy
Limavady	0–1	Ulster
Linfield	bye	
Distillery	bye	
Cliftonville	bye	
Leinster Nomads	bye	

==== Replay ====
Team 1	Score	Team 2
Ivy	0–2	Clooney Park

=== Fifth round ===
Team 1	Score	Team 2
Distillery	6–0	Leinster Nomads
Ivy	0–8	Linfield
Cliftonville	bye	
Ulster	bye	

=== Semi-finals ===
Team 1	Score	Team 2
Cliftonville	10–1	Ulster
Linfield	4–1^{1}	Distillery

- ^{1} A replay was ordered after a protest.

==== Replay ====
Team 1	Score	Team 2
Linfield	4–0	Distillery

=== Final ===
11 March 1893

Linfield	5–1	Cliftonville
T. Torrans; Milne; McKeown; Turley	Report	J. Williamson

Ulsterville, Belfast
