= Sam Jones (Welsh footballer) =

Welsh footballer

Personal information
- Full name: Samuel E. Jones
- Place of birth: Newport, Wales
- Position: Outside left

Senior career*
Years	Team	Apps	(Gls)
1932	Newport County	2	(0)
- Lovell's Athletic
1934	Bristol Rovers	0	(0)
	Epsom Town	12	(4)
- Lovell's Athletic

International career
1934	Wales Amateurs	1	(3)
- * Club domestic league appearances and goals

Samuel E. Jones was a Welsh amateur footballer who played in the Football League for Newport County as an outside left. He was capped by Wales at amateur level.
