= Jimmy Ferris =

Irish association football player

Personal information
- Full name: James Ferris
- Date of birth: 28 November 1894
- Place of birth: Belfast, Ireland
- Date of death: 10 October 1932 (aged 37)
- Place of death: Belfast, Northern Ireland
- Height: 5 ft 7 in (1.70 m)
- Position: Forward

Senior career*
Years	Team	Apps	(Gls)
1914–1917	Distillery	73	(12)
1917–1920	Belfast Celtic		
1920–1922	Chelsea	33	(8)
1922–1924	Preston North End	53	(11)
1924	Pontypridd	2	
1924–1930	Belfast Celtic		

International career
1919–1928	Ireland	6	(1)
- * Club domestic league appearances and goals

Jimmy Ferris (28 November 1894 – 10 October 1932) was an Irish footballer who played as a forward

== Club career ==
Ferris, an inside forward, began his career with Distillery during World War I. After making his debut in January 1915, Ferris was part of the team which won the County Antrim Shield the same year, and the following season scored the only goal as Distillery won the Belfast Charity Cup against Linfield.

After joining Belfast Celtic in 1917, Ferris won the Irish Cup with Celtic in his first season, and the League title the following season. Celtic would then withdraw from the League in 1920, shortly after Ferris had scored their final goal of the season in a 1-1 draw against Glenavon.

With Celtic not in action, Ferris signed for English side Chelsea in September 1920, scoring on his debut in a 3-1 defeat against Bolton Wanderers. He would go on to make 39 appearances for the Stamford Bridge club, scoring 6 goals in total before leaving for Preston North End in 1922. Ferris made 53 appearances for Preston, scoring 11 goals, and would go on to make two appearances for Pontypridd in the Southern League before returning to Belfast in October 1924.

After rejoining Celtic, Ferris was part of a successful side who won the Irish League four seasons in succession between 1925 and 1929, as well as the Irish Cup in the 1925–26 season.

== Retirement and death ==
Ferris was forced to retire from football in 1930 after being diagnosed with a heart condition, but remained with Celtic in a scouting capacity, where he was credited with bringing Davy 'Boy' Martin to the club.

Ferris died on 10 October 1932 and was buried in Milltown Cemetery. His son, Raymond would later go on to follow in his father's footsteps as an Ireland international.

== International career ==
Ferris made his Ireland debut against England during the 1919-20 British Home Championship, scoring a 70th minute equaliser. He would make 6 international appearances in total.
