= 1902–03 Irish League =

Irish League
- Season: 1902–03
- Dates: 30 August 1902 – 21 March 1903
- Champions: Distillery; 4th Irish title
- Matches played: 56
- Goals scored: 216 (3.86 per match)
- Biggest home win: Derry Celtic 6–0 Ulster; Glentoran 6–0 Derry Celtic
- Biggest away win: Ulster 0–7 Belfast Celtic
- Highest scoring: Linfield 6–1 Belfast Celtic; Ulster 0–7 Belfast Celtic

The 1902–03 Irish League was the 13th edition of the Irish League, the highest level of league competition in Irish football.

The league comprised eight teams, and Distillery won the championship for the 4th time.

== Season summary ==
St Columb's Court, who had competed the previous season, did not compete this season. Their place was taken by Bohemians, who became the first team from Dublin to be elected into the league.

== Teams and locations ==
Location of teams in the 1902–03 Irish League
Location of Belfast teams in the 1902–03 Irish League

| Team | Town | Home Ground |
|---|---|---|
| Belfast Celtic | Belfast | Celtic Park |
| Bohemians | Dublin | Dalymount Park |
| Cliftonville | Belfast | Solitude |
| Derry Celtic | Derry | Brandywell |
| Distillery | Belfast | Grosvenor Park |
| Glentoran | Belfast | The Oval |
| Linfield | Belfast | Balmoral |
| Ulster | Belfast | Ulster Cricket Ground |

== League standings ==
| Pos | Team | Pld | W | D | L | GF | GA | GR | Pts | Result |
|---|---|---|---|---|---|---|---|---|---|---|
| 1 | Distillery (C) | 14 | 9 | 2 | 3 | 34 | 20 | 1.700 | 20 | Champions |
| 2 | Linfield | 14 | 8 | 3 | 3 | 38 | 16 | 2.375 | 19 | |
| 3 | Glentoran | 14 | 7 | 3 | 4 | 30 | 18 | 1.667 | 17 | |
| 4 | Belfast Celtic | 14 | 7 | 2 | 5 | 35 | 23 | 1.522 | 16 | |
| 5 | Derry Celtic | 14 | 4 | 4 | 6 | 27 | 31 | 0.871 | 12 | |
| 6 | Cliftonville | 14 | 5 | 3 | 6 | 17 | 21 | 0.810 | 11 (Note: 2 points deducted) | |
| 7 | Bohemians | 14 | 3 | 3 | 8 | 22 | 36 | 0.611 | 9 | |
| 8 | Ulster | 14 | 3 | 0 | 11 | 13 | 51 | 0.255 | 6 | Withdrew |

Source: rsssf.com
(C) Champions

== Results ==
| Home \ Away | BCE | BOH | CLI | DCE | DIS | GLT | LIN | ULS |
|---|---|---|---|---|---|---|---|---|
| Belfast Celtic | | 2–1 | 1–1 | 2–0 | 1–2 | 3–1 | 4–2 | 4–0 |
| Bohemians | 1–4 | | 1–1 | 3–3 | 2–1 | 1–3 | 0–3 | 5–1 |
| Cliftonville | 2–1 | 2–3 | | 2–0 | 1–3 | 1–0 | 0–2 | 1–0 |
| Derry Celtic | 3–3 | 2–1 | 2–2 | | 3–1 | 4–1 | 1–1 | 6–0 |
| Distillery | 2–1 | 5–0 | 1–3 | 3–1 | | 1–1 | 2–1 | 2–1 |
| Glentoran | 2–1 | 4–0 | 2–1 | 6–0 | 2–2 | | 0–1 | 4–1 |
| Linfield | 6–1 | 2–2 | 4–0 | 3–0 | 2–4 | 1–1 | | 5–1 |
| Ulster | 0–7 | 3–2 | 1–0 | 3–2 | 1–5 | 1–3 | 0–5 | |

Source: Irish League Archive
Legend: Blue = home team win; Yellow = draw; Red = away team win.
