= Gerry Morgan (footballer) =

Irish footballer

Personal information
- Full name: Francis Gerald Morgan
- Date of birth: 25 July 1899
- Place of birth: Belfast, Ireland
- Date of death: 2 March 1959 (aged 59)
- Position: Half-back

Senior career*
Years	Team	Apps	(Gls)
1918–1919	St Peter's Swifts		
1919–1920	Cliftonville		
1920–1921	Linfield		
1922–1929	Nottingham Forest	200	(6)
1929	Luton Town	4	(0)
1929–1931	Grantham		
1931–1933	Cork		
1933	Ballymena		
Total		204	(6)

International career
1922–1928	Ireland	8	(0)
- * Club domestic league appearances and goals

Francis Gerald Morgan (25 July 1899–1959) was an Irish footballer who played in the Football League for Luton Town and Nottingham Forest.
