= Bob Morrison (footballer) =

Irish footballer

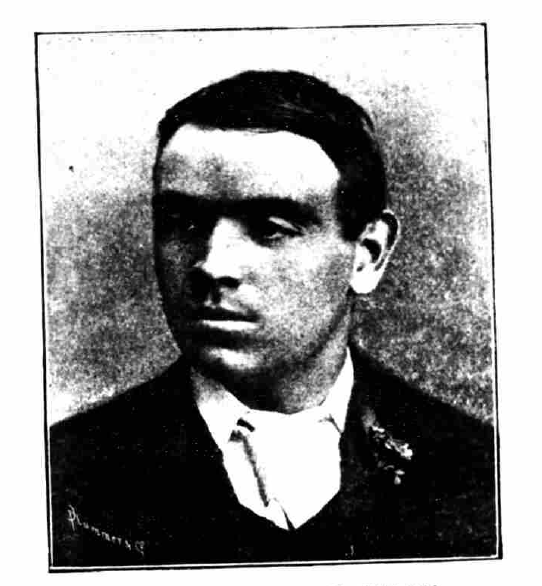

Personal information
- Full name: Robert Morrison
- Date of birth: 30 August 1869
- Place of birth: Greenock, Scotland
- Date of death: 12 July 1891 (aged 21)
- Place of death: Belfast, Ireland
- Position: Defender

Senior career*
Years	Team	Apps	(Gls)
1890–1891	Linfield		

International career
1891	Ireland	2	(0)
- * Club domestic league appearances and goals

Robert Morrison (30 August 1869 – 12 July 1891) was a footballer who played as a defender for Linfield and the Ireland national team.

Born in Greenock in Scotland, Morrison's family moved to Belfast in Ireland when he was an infant. He played in Linfield's double-winning team which claimed the Irish Cup and the first edition of the Irish League in the 1890–91 season. His standard of play led to him being selected for Ireland in two British Home Championship fixtures in early 1891, a 7–2 home win over Wales followed by a 6–1 away defeat to England. However, he contracted pneumonia and died from the illness in July of that year, aged 21.

His younger brother Tommy was also an Ireland international and played for clubs including Burnley, Celtic and Manchester United; another brother Alex played for Glentoran.
