= Matt Wilson (footballer) =

Irish footballer

Personal information
- Full name: Matthew Wilson
- Date of birth: c. 1842
- Date of death: 20 May 1897 (aged 54–55)
- Position: Right back

Senior career*
Years	Team	Apps	(Gls)
1881–1887	Distillery	23	(0)

International career
1884	Ireland	3	(0)
- * Club domestic league appearances and goals

Matthew Wilson, known as Matt Wilson and nicknamed Daddy Wilson (c. 1842 – 20 May 1897) was an Irish international footballer who played club football for Distillery as a right back.

Wilson earned three caps for Ireland at the 1884 British Home Championship.

Wilson played alongside his son Bob in the 1886 Irish Cup Final.
