= Frank Montgomery (footballer) =

Northern Irish footballer

Personal information
- Place of birth: Coleraine, Northern Ireland
- Height: 5 ft 10 in (1.78 m)
- Position: Right back

Youth career
- Coleraine Villa

Senior career*
Years	Team	Apps	(Gls)
- Coleraine

International career
1951–1955	Northern Ireland Amateurs	13	(0)
1954	Northern Ireland	1	(0)
- * Club domestic league appearances and goals

Francis J. Montgomery was a Northern Irish footballer who played as a right back.

== Career ==
Born in Coleraine, Montgomery played for Coleraine Villa and Coleraine. He also earned one cap for the Northern Ireland national team.
