= Jack Henderson (footballer, born 1844) =

Irish footballer (1844–1932)

Personal information
- Full name: John Henderson
- Date of birth: 31 July 1844
- Place of birth: Dromore, Ireland
- Date of death: 13 July 1932 (aged 87)
- Place of death: Natal Province, Union of South Africa
- Position: Goalkeeper

Senior career*
Years	Team	Apps	(Gls)
1873–1885	Ulster	?	(?)

International career
1885	Ireland	3	(0)
- * Club domestic league appearances and goals

John Henderson (31 July 1844 – 13 July 1932) was an Irish international footballer who played club football for Ulster as a goalkeeper.

Henderson earned three caps for Ireland at the 1885 British Home Championship.
