= Jimmy Gibb =

Northern Ireland footballer

Personal information
- Full name: James Gibb
- Date of birth: 6 May 1912
- Place of birth: Belfast, Northern Ireland
- Date of death: 14 January 1958 (aged 45)
- Position: Inside right

Senior career*
Years	Team	Apps	(Gls)
1934–1937	Cliftonville		
1937–1938	Linfield		

International career
1935–1938	Ireland Amateurs	7	(3)
1936	Ireland (IFA)	1	(1)
- * Club domestic league appearances and goals

James Gibb (7 May 1912 – 14 January 1958) was a Northern Irish amateur footballer who played as an inside forward in the Irish League for Cliftonville and Linfield. He scored on his only appearance for Ireland, in 3–2 win over Wales in March 1936. Gibb was a standby member of Great Britain's 1936 Summer Olympics squad.
