= Robert McCracken (footballer) =

Northern Irish footballer (1890–??)

Personal information
- Date of birth: 25 June 1890
- Place of birth: Dromore, County Down, Ireland
- Height: 5 ft 10 1/2 in (1.79 m)
- Positions: Defender; wing half

Youth career
- Dromore United: ?–1910

Senior career*
| Years | Team | Apps | (Gls) |
| 1910–1920 | Distillery | ? | (?) |
| 1920–1926 | Crystal Palace | 175 | (1) |
| 1926–? | Portadown | ? | (?) |

International career
| 1920–1922 | Ireland (IFA) | 4 | (0) |
- * Club domestic league appearances and goals

Robert McCracken (25 June 1890 – unknown), also known as Roy McCracken, was a Northern Irish professional footballer who played as a defender or as a wing half. He was a cousin of Billy McCracken who also had a career as a professional footballer.

== Playing career ==
McCracken was born in Dromore, County Down, at that time part of a united Ireland, but subsequently within the province of Northern Ireland, part of the UK. He began his youth career with local club Dromore United. In 1910, he joined Distillery. He made 118 appearances in all competitions between then and 1920. His career was interrupted by service in World War I but he returned to play for the club thereafter.

In 1920, he signed for Crystal Palace then playing in the Football League Third Division in its inaugural season. Although he sustained a broken leg in December, he made 18 league appearances in 1920–21 as Palace won the title and promotion to the Football League Second Division. That season, he also made his debut for the Ireland (IFA) national team.

McCracken returned from injury to play in Palace's first season in the second division, making 35 appearances in the league, scoring once. Over the subsequent three seasons, he made 40, 37 and 25 league appearances respectively, but without scoring. In 1925, Palace were relegated but McCracken remained with the club for one further season, making 20 appearances, before returning to Ireland in 1926 to play for Portadown.
