= Peter Rees (rugby union, born 1937) =

Welsh rugby union player

- Full name: Peter Maxwell Rees
- Born: 14 October 1937 (age 89) Bedlinog, Wales
- School: Lewis School, Pengam

Rugby union career
- Position: Wing
Senior career
Years	Team	Apps	(Points)
1960–71	Newport	330	
International career
Years	Team	Apps	(Points)
1961–64	Wales	4	(0)

Peter Maxwell Rees (born 14 October 1937) is a Welsh former international rugby union player.

Rees was born in Bedlinog and educated at Lewis School, Pengam.

A winger, Rees made 330 appearances for Newport, debuting in the 1960/61 season. He retired as the club's all-time top try-scorer, after passing previous record holder Ken Jones's tally of 146 tries in 1969.

Rees won four Wales caps. He featured three times in their 1961 Five Nations campaign, against England, Scotland and Ireland, then was capped a fourth time in 1964 replacing an injured Dewi Bebb at Lansdowne Road.

== See also ==
- List of Wales national rugby union players
