= Kevin McGarry (footballer) =

Northern Ireland footballer

Personal information
- Full name: John Kevin McGarry
- Date of birth: c. 1925
- Date of death: August 1995 (aged 70)
- Height: 5 ft 6 in (1.68 m)
- Position: Inside forward

Senior career*
Years	Team	Apps	(Gls)
1946–1948	Belfast Celtic		(5)
1948–1959	Cliftonville		
1959–1960	Sligo Rovers	8	(2)
1960–1961	Dundalk	2	(0)
1961–1964	Cliftonville	3	(0)
1964–1965	Limerick	5	(4)

International career
1948–1957	Northern Ireland Amateurs	15	(11)
1950–1951	Northern Ireland	3	(1)
- * Club domestic league appearances and goals

John Kevin McGarry (c. 1925 – August 1995) was a Northern Ireland international footballer who played with Cliftonville from 1949. He played Gaelic football before being convinced to sign amateur forms with Belfast Celtic. He played a few first-team games for Celtic before signing with Cliftonville. At Solitude he was also a prolific goalscorer. He was named as the inaugural Ulster Footballer of the Year for the 1950–51 season.

As a student at Queen's University, he was selected by Ireland for an amateur international against England in February 1948: a 5–0 defeat. He was then chosen for an Irish F.A. representative side which beat the United States 5–0, with McGarry scoring twice. In 1952, he was part of the Great Britain squad at the Helsinki Olympics, but he did not play in any matches.

He was selected for Ireland's 1950–51 Home Nations squad, making his full international debut against Scotland at Hampden Park, in which he scored in a 2–1 defeat. He earned two more caps, also playing in the match against Wales, and then in a friendly against France.

He represented the Irish League on numerous occasions, scoring a record 12 goals.
