= Bertie Fulton =

Irish footballer

Personal information
- Full name: Robert Patrick Fulton
- Date of birth: 6 November 1906
- Place of birth: Larne, Ireland
- Date of death: 5 May 1979 (aged 72)
- Place of death: Larne, Northern Ireland
- Position: Left back

Senior career*
Years	Team	Apps	(Gls)
1923–1925	Larne		
1925	Belfast Celtic		
1925–1926	London Caledonians		
1926	Belfast Celtic		
1926	Dundalk	1	(0)
1926–1928	Larne		
1928–1943	Belfast Celtic		
1943–1944	Larne		

International career
1925–1938	Ireland Amateur	21	(1)
1928–1938	Ireland	21	(0)
1936	Great Britain	2	(0)
- * Club domestic league appearances and goals

Robert Patrick Fulton (6 November 1906 – 5 May 1979) was an amateur footballer from Northern Ireland who played as a left back.

== Career ==
=== Club career ===
Fulton played club football in both Ireland and England for Larne, Belfast Celtic, London Caledonians and Dundalk.

=== International career ===
Fulton earned 21 caps for Ireland between 1928 and 1938; he also earned 21 caps for the Ireland Amateur team between 1925 and 1938. Fulton also represented Great Britain at the 1936 Summer Olympics.
