= Bob Moore (Irish footballer) =

Irish footballer

Personal information
- Full name: Robert Lee Moore
- Position: Half back

Senior career*
| Years | Team | Apps | (Gls) |
| – | Ulster | ? | (?) |

International career
| 1887 | Ireland | 2 | (0) |
- * Club domestic league appearances and goals

Robert Lee Moore was an Irish international footballer who played club football for Ulster as a half back.

Moore made two appearances for Ireland at the 1887 British Home Championship.
