= Dick Pegg =

English footballer

Ernest Pegg (July 1878 – 11 June 1916), commonly known as Dick Pegg, was an English footballer who played as a forward. Born in Leicester, he played for Leicester Fosse, Loughborough, Kettering Town, Reading, Preston North End, Manchester United, Fulham and Barnsley.
