= Hugh Barr =

Northern Irish footballer

Personal information
- Full name: Hubert Henry Barr
- Date of birth: 17 May 1935 (age 91)
- Place of birth: Ballymena, Northern Ireland
- Height: 5 ft 5 in (1.65 m)
- Position: Forward

Youth career
- Wellington Street Boys' Brigade
- Harryville Amateurs
- Ballyclare Comrades

Senior career*
Years	Team	Apps	(Gls)
1954–1956	Cliftonville		(9)
1956	Loughborough College		
1956	Everton	0	(0)
1956–1959	Coleraine		(34)
1959–1961	Ballymena United		(32)
1961–1962	Linfield	18	(12)
1962–1964	Coventry City	47	(15)
1964–1967	Cambridge United		
1967–1972	Ely City		

International career
1956–1962	Northern Ireland Amateur	14	(11)
1959	Northern Ireland B	1	(1)
1961–1962	Northern Ireland	3	(1)

Managerial career
- 1967–1972: Ely City
- * Club domestic league appearances and goals

Hubert Henry Barr (born 17 May 1935), known as Hugh Barr, is a Northern Irish former footballer who played as a forward at both professional and international levels.

== Early and personal life ==
Born in Ballymena, Barr studied at Queen's University Belfast.

== Career ==
=== Club career ===
Barr played for Wellington Street Boys' Brigade, Harryville Amateurs, Ballyclare Comrades, Cliftonville, Loughborough College, Everton, Coleraine, Ballymena United, Linfield, Coventry City and Cambridge United, before becoming player-manager at Ely City.

Barr's goal scoring feats at Linfield attracted much attention. Division 3 Coventry City's manager Jimmy Hill secured his transfer despite other League clubs showing interest. Northern Ireland had capped Barr when he was a Linfield player.

=== International career ===
Barr played for Northern Ireland amateur, Northern Ireland B and Northern Ireland. He was a member of the Great Britain squad at the 1960 Summer Olympics, although he did not make an appearance in the tournament.
