= Lawrence Smith (footballer, born 1878) =

English footballer

Lawrence Smith (July 1878 – September 1912) was an English footballer. His regular position was as a forward. He was born in Manchester. He played for Army Football, New Brompton, and Manchester United.
