= James Williams (Irish footballer) =

Irish footballer

Personal information
- Full name: James Richard Williams
- Position: Forward

Senior career*
Years	Team	Apps	(Gls)
–	Ulster	?	(?)

International career
1886	Ireland	2	(1)
- * Club domestic league appearances and goals

James Richard Williams was an Irish international footballer who played club football for Ulster as a forward.

Williams made two appearances for Ireland at the 1886 British Home Championship, scoring one goal.
