= Pat Nelis =

Irish footballer (1898–1970)

Personal information
- Full name: Patrick Nelis
- Date of birth: 5 October 1898
- Place of birth: Derry, Ireland
- Date of death: 1970 (aged 71–72)
- Position: Centre forward

Senior career*
Years	Team	Apps	(Gls)
1919–1921	Londonderry Distillery		
1921–1922	Accrington Stanley	11	(14)
1922–1925	Nottingham Forest	59	(13)
1925–1926	Wigan Borough	16	(1)
1926–1929	Coleraine		
1929–1931	Rossville Hall		
1931	Derry City		
Total		86	(28)

International career
1922	Ireland	1	(0)
- * Club domestic league appearances and goals

Patrick Nelis (5 October 1898 – 1970) was an Irish footballer who played in the Football League for Accrington Stanley, Nottingham Forest and Wigan Borough.
