= Jack Hastings =

Irish footballer

Personal information
- Full name: John Hastings
- Date of birth: 1858
- Place of birth: Belfast, Ireland
- Date of death: March 1935 (aged 76–77)
- Place of death: Belfast, Northern Ireland
- Position: Centre half

Senior career*
Years	Team	Apps	(Gls)
1879–1880	Ulster	?	(?)
1880–1882	Knock	?	(?)
1882–1887	Ulster	?	(?)
Total		?	(?)

International career
1882–1886	Ireland	7	(0)
- * Club domestic league appearances and goals

John Hastings (1858 – March 1935) was an Irish international footballer who played club football for Ulster and Knock as a centre half.

Hastings earned a total of seven caps for Ireland between 1882 and 1886.
