= Jimmy Watson (Irish footballer) =

Irish footballer

Personal information
- Full name: James Watson
- Position: Full back

Senior career*
Years	Team	Apps	(Gls)
–	Ulster	?	(?)

International career
1883–1889	Ireland	9	(0)
- * Club domestic league appearances and goals

James Watson was an Irish international footballer who played club football for Ulster as a full back.

Watson earned nine caps for Ireland between 1883 and 1889.
