= William Fox (footballer) =

Irish footballer

Personal information
- Full name: William Taylor Fox
- Position: Full back

Senior career*
Years	Team	Apps	(Gls)
–	Ulster	?	(?)

International career
1887	Ireland	2	(0)
- * Club domestic league appearances and goals

William Taylor Fox was an Irish international footballer who played as a full back.

Fox played club football for Ulster, and earned two caps for Ireland at the 1887 British Home Championship.
