= Bill Cunningham (footballer) =

Irish footballer

Senior career*
Years	Team	Apps	(Gls)
- Ulster

International career
1892–1893	Ireland	4	(0)
- * Club domestic league appearances and goals

William R. Cunningham was an Irish international footballer who played club football for Ulster.

Cunningham earned four caps for Ireland - three at the 1892 British Home Championship and one at the 1893 British Home Championship.
