= Peter Watson (footballer, born 1944) =

Northern Irish footballer and manager

Personal information
- Date of birth: 3 March 1944 (age 82)
- Place of birth: Coventry, England
- Height: 5 ft 9 in (1.75 m)
- Position: Striker

Youth career
- Bessbrook Wanderers

Senior career*
Years	Team	Apps	(Gls)
1959–1961	Newry Town		
1961–1962	Aston Villa	0	(0)
1962–1968	Glenavon		
1968–1969	Glentoran	19	(3)
1969–1973	Distillery	146	(61)
1973–1975	Dundalk	46	(0)
1975–1976	Portadown		
- Dungannon Swifts

International career
1965–1967	Irish League XI	4	(1)
1971	Northern Ireland	1	(0)

Managerial career
- 1974: Dundalk (player-caretaker manager)
- Dungannon Swifts (player-manager)
- 1994–1996: Newry City
- Banbridge Town
- Rathfriland Rangers
- Lurgan Celtic
- * Club domestic league appearances and goals

Peter Watson (born 3 March 1944) is a Northern Irish former football player and manager.

== Playing career ==
Born in Coventry, England, Watson played as a striker for Bessbrook Wanderers, Newry Town, Aston Villa, Glenavon, Glentoran, Distillery, Dundalk, Portadown and Dungannon Swifts. He also earned one cap for the Northern Ireland national team, when he replaced Sammy Todd in the 88th minute of a 5–0 victory over Cyprus.

== Coaching career ==
Watson served as player-manager of Dundalk (in a caretaker role) and Dungannon Swifts, and as manager at Newry City, Banbridge Town, Rathfriland Rangers and Lurgan Celtic.
