= Bob Wilson (footballer, born 1867) =

Irish footballer

Personal information
- Full name: Robert Wilson
- Date of birth: 1867
- Position: Right back

Senior career*
Years	Team	Apps	(Gls)
1883–1887	Distillery	?	(?)
1887–xxxx	Cliftonville	?	(?)
Total		?	(?)

International career
1888	Ireland	1	(0)
- * Club domestic league appearances and goals

Robert Wilson (born 1867) was an Irish international footballer who played club football for Distillery and Cliftonville as a right back.

Wilson earned one cap for Ireland at the 1888 British Home Championship.

Wilson played alongside his father Matt in the 1886 Irish Cup Final.
