= William McCabe (footballer) =

Irish footballer

Personal information
- Position: Forward

Senior career*
Years	Team	Apps	(Gls)
–	Ulster	?	(?)

International career
1891	Ireland	1	(0)
- * Club domestic league appearances and goals

William McCabe was an Irish international footballer who played club football for Ulster as a forward.

McCabe earned one cap for Ireland in 1891.
