= Jack Reid (footballer) =

Irish footballer

Personal information
- Full name: John Reid
- Position: Forward

Senior career*
Years	Team	Apps	(Gls)
–	Ulster	?	(?)

International career
1883–1890	Ireland	6	(0)
- * Club domestic league appearances and goals

John "Jack" Reid was an Irish international footballer who played club football for Ulster as a forward.

Reid earned six caps for Ireland between 1883 and 1890.
