= Ray Ferris =

Northern Irish footballer

Personal information
- Full name: Raymond Osborn Ferris
- Date of birth: 22 September 1920
- Place of birth: Newry, County Down, Ireland
- Date of death: 1 February 1994 (aged 73)
- Place of death: Manchester, England
- Height: 5 ft 8 1/2 in (1.74 m)
- Position: Left half

Youth career
- Sweetafton Rovers
- Glentoran (trial)
- 1938–1939: Brentford (amateur)
- 1939: Cambridge Town
- Distillery (trial)
- Linfield

Senior career*
Years	Team	Apps	(Gls)
1945–1949	Crewe Alexandra	101	(23)
1949–1953	Birmingham City	90	(3)
1953–1954	Worcester City		

International career
1949–1951	Northern Ireland	3	(1)
- * Club domestic league appearances and goals

Raymond Osborn Ferris (22 September 1920 – 1 February 1994) was a Northern Irish professional footballer who played as a left half. He played nearly 200 games in the Football League for Crewe Alexandra and Birmingham City, and won three international caps for Northern Ireland. His father, James, had also been an international footballer.

Born in Newry, County Down, Ferris spent short trial spells at Irish League clubs Distillery and Glentoran before crossing to England where he signed amateur forms for Brentford. By the time the Second World War broke out he was playing non-league football for Cambridge Town and then moved to Linfield. During the war he made guest appearances for Tottenham Hotspur, West Ham United and former club Brentford.

After the war he signed professionally for Crewe Alexandra, for whom he played over 100 times. He then moved to First Division club Birmingham City, for whom he also made over 100 appearances. He was a hard-working, hard-tackling type of half-back with great determination. In the closed season of 1953 he went on a representative tour with the IFA to the United States and Canada, where he sustained a leg injury that eventually ended his career. Though he played for Worcester City in the Southern League for one more season, he was forced to retire in 1954.

Ferris died in a Manchester nursing home in February 1994, aged 73. His legs had been amputated due to circulation problems.
