= Alec McCartney =

Irish footballer (1879–1968)

Personal information
- Full name: Alexander Douglas McCartney
- Date of birth: 14 November 1879
- Place of birth: Belfast, Ireland
- Date of death: 21 July 1968 (aged 88)
- Place of death: Belfast, Northern Ireland
- Position: Full back

Youth career
- Rosetta National School
- Ferndale
- Hatfield

Senior career*
Years	Team	Apps	(Gls)
1900–1902	Distillery		
1902–1903	Ulster		
1903–1904	Linfield		
1904–1905	Everton	0	(0)
1905–1906	West Ham United	6	(0)
1906–1908	Belfast Celtic		
1908–1909	Glentoran	23	(0)
1909–1910	Linfield		
Total		29	(0)

International career
1903–1909	Ireland	15	(0)
- * Club domestic league appearances and goals

Alexander Douglas McCartney (14 November 1879 – 21 July 1968) was an Irish international footballer, active in both Ireland and England, who played as a full back.

== Career ==
Born in the Ballynafeigh district of Belfast, McCartney played youth football with Rosetta National School, Ferndale of the Belfast Alliance League, and then Hatfield, before beginning his senior career in 1900 with Distillery. McCartney later played for Ulster and Linfield before moving to England to join Everton, where he spent a single season without making a League appearance. He moved to West Ham United, along with Everton teammate George Kitchen, in the summer of 1905 and played six Southern League Division One games for the club during 1905–06.

After leaving West Ham, McCartney returned to Ireland and played for Belfast Celtic and Glentoran, before returning to Linfield.

McCartney earned fifteen caps for Ireland between 1903 and 1909.
