= Billy Johnston (footballer, born 1942) =

Northern Irish footballer and manager

Personal information
- Full name: William Cecil Johnston
- Date of birth: 21 May 1942 (age 84)
- Place of birth: Coalisland, Northern Ireland
- Height: 5 ft 9 in (1.75 m)
- Position: Inside forward

Youth career
- Coalisland Rangers

Senior career*
Years	Team	Apps	(Gls)
1960–1966	Glenavon		(141)
1966–1968	Oldham Athletic	29	(6)

International career
1961–1966	Northern Ireland Amateurs	13	(3)
1962	Northern Ireland U23	1	(0)
1962–1966	Northern Ireland	2	(1)

Managerial career
- 1972–1977: Crusaders
- 1977–1979: Ballymena United
- Bangor
- 1985–1987: Glentoran
- * Club domestic league appearances and goals

William Cecil Johnston (born 21 May 1942 in Coalisland) is a retired footballer and manager, who was most notable as the first ever Crusaders manager to win the league with the club, on two occasions (1973 and 1976).

Billy was a keen participant of sport at school, representing Ulster Schools at rugby, and was selected for the Northern Ireland Youth international football team against all three of the other home countries in 1959.

As a 16-year-old, he joined Glenavon and soon forced his way into the first team. A prolific goalscorer with a touch of class, Billy soon emphasised his impact with the Lurgan Blues by scoring a hat-trick in a league match against Bangor that clinched the 1959–60 Irish League title. Over the next few seasons Billy's goal tally and reputation grew, and he scored 4 goals when the Irish League Select played the Italian League Select at Windsor Park in 1962, in a 6–2 victory. He then picked up his full Northern Ireland international cap in a match against Wales, just after his 20th birthday.

In June 1966, then manager of Oldham Athletic, Jimmy McIlroy, signed him for £10,000, and he also scored his first international goal in a 4–1 victory over Mexico at Windsor Park just before the 1966 World Cup. Unfortunately for Billy, he picked up a serious ankle injury just 4 weeks into his Football League career, that forced him to retire at the age of just 26.

During the 1971–72 season, he took over the reins at Crusaders, winning the league title in 1972–73 and 1975–76, leading the club to famous ties against the likes of Dinamo Bucharest and Liverpool.

A few years after that second title he went on to manage Ballymena United and Glentoran, where he also won a league championship, before retiring from management.
