= Ligoniel F.C. =

Ligoniel
- Full name: Ligoniel Football Club
- Nickname(s): The Ligs, The Mountaineers, The Reds
- Founded: 1881
- Dissolved: 1899
- Ground: Hill Street
- League: Irish League
Home colours

Ligoniel Football Club was an Irish football club based in the then village of Ligoniel on the outskirts of Belfast.

== History ==
It was founded in 1881 and was a founding member of the Irish Junior League in 1890, before joining the Irish Football League for the 1891–92 season. The club was excluded for the 1892–93 season as the League was reduced to six members.

It was admitted again for the 1893–94 season, and the club reached the last 6 of the Irish Cup - helped by being exempted from the first three rounds - for the only time. At home to Cliftonville, Ligoniel took a 2–0 lead at half-time on a frosty pitch, but the visitors, with the wind and slope in their favour, recovered to win 4–2.

For the 1894–95 season, the Irish League members decided to reduce membership further from 6 to 4, and, with Ulster abandoning association for rugby, Ligoniel was "harshly" thrown out, so rejoined the Junior League. It remained a member of the Junior League until it folded in 1899, having lost its ground and been unable to procure a new one.

== Colours ==
The club played in red.

== Ground ==
The club's ground was situated at the end of Hill Street, off Legoniel Street.
