= Billy McKeag =

Northern Ireland footballer

Personal information
- Full name: William McKeag
- Date of birth: 30 November 1945 (age 80)
- Place of birth: Belfast, Northern Ireland
- Height: 5 ft 8 in (1.73 m)
- Position: Full back

Youth career
- Willowfield

Senior career*
Years	Team	Apps	(Gls)
1964–1980	Glentoran		
1967	→ Detroit Cougars (loan)	3	(0)

International career
1967–1968	Northern Ireland	2	(0)
- * Club domestic league appearances and goals

William McKeag (born 30 November 1945) is a Northern Irish former professional footballer who played as a full back.

== Career ==
Born in Belfast, McKeag played for Willowfield, Glentoran and the Detroit Cougars. He also earned two caps for the Northern Ireland national team.
