= Londonderry Sentinel =

Northern Irish newspaper

- Type: Weekly newspaper
- Format: Tabloid
- Owner(s): National World
- Editor: Peter Hutcheon
- Founded: 19 September 1829
- Political alignment: Unionist
- Headquarters: Waterside, Derry
- Circulation: 110 (as of 2023)
- Website: londonderrysentinel.co.uk

The Londonderry Sentinel is a newspaper based in Derry, Northern Ireland. It is published by National World. Peter Hutcheon is the current editor. The Roe Valley Sentinel is an edition of the paper, and combined they have a circulation of 4,955.

The paper was originally titled the Londonderry Sentinel and North West Advertiser and was first published on 19 September 1829 at the price of 5d (five pence). It was founded by a group that included William Wallen, who had edited what was then the Londonderry Journal and General Advertiser (now Derry Journal) but quit over the moderate political stance of the Journal (the paper backed calls for Catholic Emancipation which was finally introduced in 1829). Both papers are now owned by Johnston Press.

When first launched, the Sentinel was published on a Saturday, but during the past three centuries it has been published on Tuesday and Thursday at various times, and had competed as a regional alternative to the Belfast Telegraph. Today it takes a tabloid form and is published every Wednesday.

From 1 January to 1 July 2007, the Londonderry Sentinel series had an Audited Bureau of Circulations-assessed circulation of 4,955
