= Peter Rees (footballer) =

Welsh footballer

Personal information
- Full name: Peter Noel Rees
- Date of birth: 5 May 1932 (age 94)
- Place of birth: Machynlleth, Wales
- Position: Inside forward

Senior career*
Years	Team	Apps	(Gls)
- Llanidloes Town
1956–1957	Tranmere Rovers	9	(4)
- * Club domestic league appearances and goals

Peter Noel Rees (born 5 May 1932) is a Welsh former amateur footballer, who played as an inside forward in the Football League for Tranmere Rovers.
