= Derry Olympic F.C. =

- Full name: Derry Olympic
- Nickname(s): the Olympic, the Redshirts
- Founded: 1892
- Dissolved: 1892
- Ground: Brandywell Road
- Manager: J. M. Wilton
- League: Irish Football League
Home colours

Derry Olympic Football Club was a football team from Derry, Ireland that was a member of the Irish League for the 1892–93 season.

== History ==
The club was founded in April 1892 to provide representation from County Londonderry in the Irish League. The side was chosen by James Wilton chiefly from players from the then-Intermediate sides of St Columb's Court and Limavady. As the rest of the League was made up of clubs from Belfast, there was some concern over payment of travelling expenses to a club whose crowd sizes were going to be uncertain.

The club's first match was away at Cliftonville in the League on 3 September 1892, and was a disaster for the Olympic; despite pre-match hopes that the side would be more than a match for the Belfast sides, the "want of combination" between players from different clubs saw the Olympic taken apart in the first half, changing ends 6–0 down, and a number of spectators left, "no doubt disgusted by the poor play of the Olympic". The Derry supporters, however, stayed loyal and loud, and got their reward when Wilton scored the first goal for the club; however, the game ended 8–1 to the home side.

The defeat set the tone for the season; the Olympic did not win a single League match - indeed the only game it did not lose was a 2–2 draw at Distillery, Olympic losing a two-goal lead in the final quarter of an hour. Interest in other county clubs lending players to the Olympic ended fairly quickly; the first match for which Olympic did not turn up was at Ulster, as early as September, and Limavady sent its own XI to ensure that a match was played.

By the end of the season the Olympic had forfeited 4 out of the 10 matches, ostensibly due to a lack of a £6 guarantee gate-share in order to travel to Belfast; however by the end of October the Olympic had not paid its subscription to the Irish Football Association. The Olympic had been allowed into the 1892–93 Irish Cup, as members of the Derry Association, and, as a League club, exempted until the third round, but at that stage the club scratched to Clooney Park.

Given the club's failure to attend matches, the Irish FA fined it £5, and ordered it to play its last home game against Linfield in Belfast, but it did not turn up, and "the last has been heard of this celebrated Derry Olympic team." James Wilton brought a side together under the Olympic name for a handful of exhibition matches in October 1894.

== Colours ==
The club wore red shirts.

== Ground ==
The club played at Brandywell Road.

== International player ==
- James Wilton, who earned two caps for Ireland in 1893 when still registered with Olympic (as well as St. Columb's Court).
