= Ernie McCleary =

Northern Irish footballer

Personal information
- Full name: James Warren McCleary
- Date of birth: c. 1923
- Place of birth: Hillsborough, Northern Ireland
- Date of death: 8 February 2012 (aged 88)
- Place of death: Ballynahinch, Northern Ireland
- Height: 5 ft 9 in (1.75 m)
- Position: Centre half

Senior career*
Years	Team	Apps	(Gls)
- Glentoran
- Cliftonville

International career
1948–1956	Northern Ireland Amateur	15	(0)
1955	Northern Ireland	1	(0)
- * Club domestic league appearances and goals

James Warren McCleary (c. 1923 – 8 February 2012) was a Northern Irish footballer who played as a centre half.

== Career ==
Born in Hillsborough, County Down, McCleary played as an amateur for Glentoran and Cliftonville whilst also working as a French teacher. He also earned one cap for the Northern Ireland national team and fifteen caps for the Northern Ireland national amateur team.
