= Boy Martin =

Northern Irish footballer

Personal information
- Full name: David Kirker Martin
- Date of birth: 1 February 1914
- Place of birth: Belfast, Northern Ireland
- Date of death: 10 January 1991 (aged 76)
- Place of death: Belfast, Northern Ireland
- Height: 1.73 m (5 ft 8 in)
- Position: Centre forward

Senior career*
Years	Team	Apps	(Gls)
- Royal Ulster Rifles
–1932	Cliftonville		
1932–1934	Belfast Celtic		
1934–1936	Wolverhampton Wanderers	25	(17)
1936–1938	Nottingham Forest	81	(41)
1938–1946	Notts County	26	(16)
	→ Glentoran (guest)	41	(63)
1942–1943	→ Watford (guest)	9	(7)
	→ Aldershot (guest)	1	(0)
	→ Fulham (guest)	1	(1)
- → Derry City (guest)
1946–1947	Ballymoney United		
1947	Ballymena United	6	(6)

International career
1932–1933	Ireland Amateurs	4	(4)
1933–1934	Irish League XI	4	(4)
1933–1938	Ireland (IFA)	10	(3)
- * Club domestic league appearances and goals

David Kirker Martin (1 February 1914 – 10 January 1991), known as Boy Martin or Davy Boy Martin, was a Northern Irish professional football centre forward, best remembered for his spells in the Football League with Nottingham Forest, Wolverhampton Wanderers and Notts County. He was capped by Ireland at full and amateur level. After retiring from football, Martin coached at Ballymena United and Carrick Rangers.

In September 1933, Martin scored both of goals as Ireland defeated Scotland 2–1 in a full British Home Championship international. Two weeks later he got another brace, this time for the Irish League XI in Belfast when they won 3–0 over the Scottish Football League XI.

== Personal life ==
Martin served as a drummer boy in the Royal Ulster Rifles, where he acquired his nickname, "Boy". He re-enlisted in the British Army early in the Second World War and was wounded in Normandy in 1944.

== Honours ==
Belfast Celtic

- Irish League: 1932–33

== See also ==
- List of men's footballers with 500 or more goals
