= George Sheehan (footballer) =

Irish footballer

George Sheehan was an Irish soccer player during the 1890s and early 20th century. He played for the amateur Bohemians club and the Ireland national team.

Sheehan was captain of the Irish team in the first ever soccer international played at Lansdowne Road, a 2–0 defeat to England in 1900. He played in the first match at Dalymount Park as Bohs beat Shelbourne 4–2 on 7 September 1901. He scored in 4 consecutive Leinster Senior Cup finals from 1895 to 1898.

His brother Willie played alongside him in the Bohemian teams of the 1890s.

== Honours ==
- Leinster Senior Cup: 6
  - 1893, 1894, 1895, 1896, 1897, 1898
- Leinster League
  - 1899/1900, 1900/01
