= Lancashire Fusiliers F.C. =

Former association football club in Northern Ireland

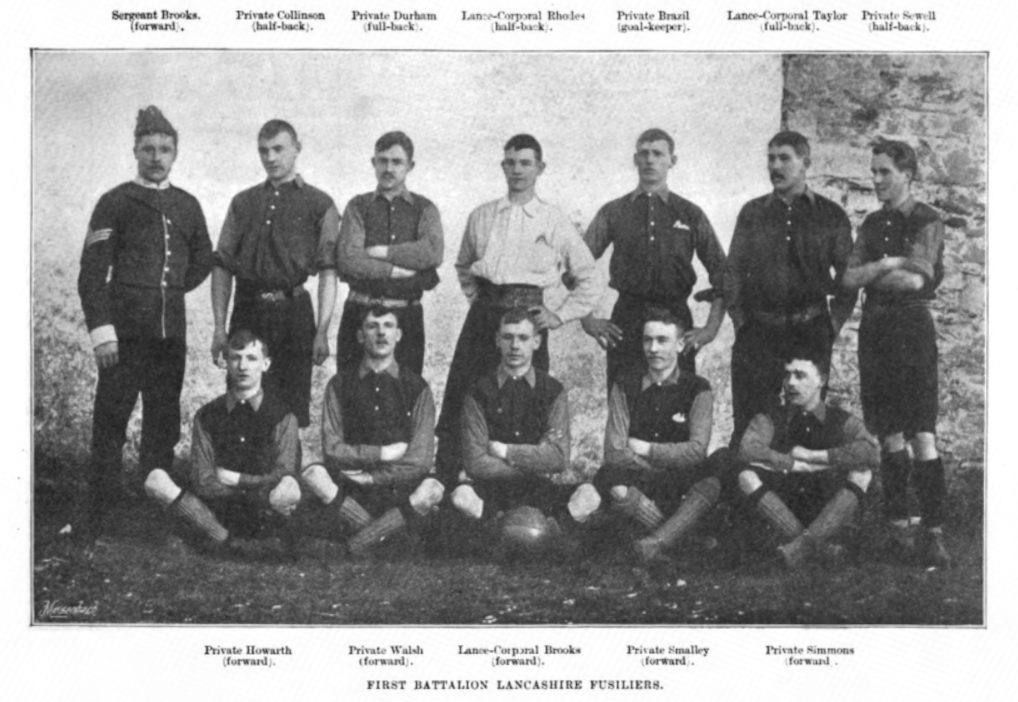
- 1895
- Full name: Lancashire Fusiliers Football Club
- Founded: 1889
- Ground: none
- League: Irish Football League
Home colours

The Lancashire Fusiliers Football Club was a team of the 1st Battalion, The Lancashire Fusiliers, that was a member of the Irish Football League for the 1891–92 season, while deployed in Victoria Barracks, Belfast.

== History ==
The club was started in 1889, when stationed in Glasgow, and moved to Ireland in April 1891.

== Colours ==
The club's colours were amber and chocolate.

== Ground ==
The club played at Willowbank.
