= 1891–92 Irish League =

Irish League
- Season: 1891–92
- Dates: 5 September 1891 – 4 May 1892
- Champions: Linfield; 2nd Irish title
- Matches: 64
- Goals: 436 (6.81 per match)
- Top goalscorer: Tim Morrison (21 goals)
- Biggest home win: Glentoran 15–1 Oldpark; Linfield 14–0 Oldpark
- Biggest away win: Ligoniel 2–13 Lancashire Fusiliers
- Highest scoring: Glentoran 15–1 Oldpark

The 1891–92 Irish League was the 2nd edition of the Irish League, the highest level of league competition in Irish football.

The league comprised ten teams, expanding from eight in the previous season. Linfield won the championship for the second year in a row.

== Season summary ==
Clarence, who had competed in the previous season, withdrew from the league on 1 September 1891 and disbanded later the same year. Their place in the league was taken by Lancashire Fusiliers who were unable to play their opening league game due to the short notice given. On 18 April 1892, they were awarded a win (2 points) for this fixture and were also awarded 1 point for an unplayed match against Distillery. The Fusiliers (who were a British Army team), had no home ground and therefore played all their matches at their opponents' grounds.

On 2 February 1882, Distillery were fined £10 and had 2 points deducted for fielding an ineligible player against Linfield, but the 2–1 result was allowed to stand. They were initially expelled from the league on 10 February for failing to pay the fine but were reinstated on 24 February after paying a reduced amount. However some teams refused to accept this decision, with Glentoran being fined £15 on 12 April for refusing to play their fixture against Distillery. Other unplayed Distillery fixtures against Milltown, Ulster, Cliftonville and Ligoniel were declared void.

Other unplayed matches were Cliftonville v Glentoran (registered as a 1–1 draw by the Irish League), and Ligoniel v Cliftonville (both teams awarded 1 point by the League).

Two teams withdrew from the league before the season concluded: YMCA resigned on 19 December 1891 with their remaining fixtures declared void, and Oldpark resigned on 20 April 1892 after hostility had been shown towards them for playing against Distillery - their remaining fixtures were awarded to their opponents.

== Teams and locations ==
Location of teams in the 1891–92 Irish League; all matches were played in Belfast

Team	Town	Home Ground
Cliftonville	Belfast	Solitude
Distillery	Belfast	Grosvenor Park
Glentoran	Belfast	King's Field
Lancashire Fusiliers	No home ground	
Ligoniel	Belfast	Ligoniel
Linfield	Belfast	Ulsterville
Milltown	Belfast	Milltown
Oldpark	Belfast	Oldpark
Ulster	Belfast	Ulster Cricket Ground
YMCA	Belfast	Enfield

== League standings ==
Pos	Team	Pld	W	D	L	GF	GA	GR	Pts	Result
1	Linfield (C)	17	15	1	1	106	14	7.571	31	Champions
2	Lancashire Fusiliers	16	11	2	3	56	29	1.931	24	Withdrew
3	Ulster	16	12	0	4	61	34	1.794	24	
4	Glentoran	16	9	3	4	81	41	1.976	21	
5	Cliftonville	16	5	4	7	31	39	0.795	14	
6	Distillery	10	7	0	3	40	17	2.353	12 (Note: 2 points deducted)	
7	Milltown	16	4	0	12	12	77	0.156	8	Withdrew
8	Ligoniel	16	3	1	12	24	72	0.333	7	Withdrew
9	Oldpark (Note: Oldpark resigned from the league on 20 April 1892; their remaining fixtures were awarded to their opponents.)	16	2	0	14	11	73	0.151	4	Withdrew
10	YMCA (Note: YMCA resigned from the league on 19 December 1891; their remaining fixtures were declared void.)	9	0	1	8	14	40	0.350	1	Withdrew

Source: Irish League Archive
(C) Champions

== Results ==
Home \ Away	CLI	DIS	GLT	LAN	LIG	LIN	MIL	OLD	ULS	YMC
Cliftonville		– (Note: Match not played, no rating.)	1–1	1–3	4–1	0–5	8–0	7–1	0–3	3–3
Distillery	3–1		–	– (Note: Match rated as goalless away win.)	5–0	2–1	–	7–0	5–3	–
Glentoran	4–4	4–3		2–3	3–1	1–7	11–0	15–1	6–5	–
Lancashire Fusiliers	1–0	– (Note: The matches Lancashire Fusiliers–Distillery and Ligoniel–Cliftonville were not played, but all teams got a point with 0:0 goals.)	1–1		13–2	2–6	4–0	– (Note: Match rated as goalless home win.)	2–5	–
Ligoniel	2–2	–	0–9	1–5		3–8	4–0	–	2–4	–
Linfield	8–0	6–1	8–0	0–0	7–1		14–0	9–0	8–1	–
Milltown	–	0–4	0–9	0–8	7–3	1–3		–	0–4	3–2
Oldpark	–	–	0–7	3–10	3–0	1–7	–		2–9	–
Ulster	4–0	–	7–0	5–0	–	1–5	3–1	2–0		5–2
YMCA	–	2–10	0–7	3–4	2–4	0–4	–	–	–	

Source: Irish League Archive
Legend: Blue = home team win; Yellow = draw; Red = away team win.
