= Ulster F.C. =

Northern Irish former rugby union & football club, based in Ballynafeigh

- Full name: Ulster Football Club
- Nickname: the Red Hand
- Founded: 1877; 149 years ago
- Ground: Prospect 1877-79; Ulster Cricket Ground 1879-1930s
- League: Irish Football League
Home colours

Ulster Football Club is a defunct Irish association football club that was based in Ballynafeigh, Belfast.

== History ==
It was initially founded in 1877 as a rugby club, but later switched codes to association football. It was subsequently a founding member of the Irish Football League in 1890. The club later switched back to rugby and continued playing into the 1930s.

The club was founded by members of Ulster Cricket Club and played its home games at the Ulster Cricket Ground. It is listed as a rugby club in Richard M. Peter's Irish Football Annual 1880 and during the 1879–80 season it played 24 games, taking on, among others, local rivals North of Ireland and Queen's College, Belfast.

On October 24, 1878, the club hosted a demonstration game between two Scottish association football teams, Queen's Park and Caledonian. This game is recognised as the earliest organised association football match played in Ireland. Ulster duly played a game in April 1879 to Association rules against Queen's College at Ormeau Road, the sides drawing 3–3, Ulster's goals coming from a scrimmage, C. Thompson, and A. Murray; but otherwise the club continued playing rugby, before switching to association football for the 1882–83 season.

During the 1880s and early 1890s, both Ulster and its home ground played a prominent role in the early history of association football in Ireland. Ulster reached the Irish Cup final on three occasions, winning the competition in 1887 after defeating Cliftonville 3–0 in the final. They were also founder members of the Irish Football League and finished as runners-up during its first two seasons, 1890–91 and 1891–92. The club was a member of the League for six seasons in total: four between 1890 and 1894 and two from 1901 to 1903. In between times, the club reverted to rugby, playing in the Ulster Senior League from 1894 to 1901. During the 1880s, Ballynafeigh also hosted several Irish Cup finals and Ireland international games.

== Colours ==
The club played in black and red.

== Honours ==
- Irish Cup 1:
  - 1886–87

== Notable former players ==
=== Ireland internationals ===
Twelve Ulster F.C. players represented Ireland at international level, winning 44 caps between them. Reynolds also went on to play for England.

- Bill Cunningham
- William Fox
- Jack Hastings
- Jack Henderson
- William McCabe
- Alec McCartney
- Fred McKee
- Bob Moore
- Jack Reid
- Jack Reynolds
- Jimmy Watson
- James Williams

== See also ==
- Ulster Cricket Club
