= 1907–08 County Antrim Shield =

Tournament details
- Country: Ireland
- Date: 25 January 1908 – 28 March 1908
- Teams: 6

Final positions
- Champions: Linfield (5th win)
- Runners-up: Distillery

Tournament statistics
- Matches played: 8
- Goals scored: 22 (2.75 per match)

The 1907–08 County Antrim Shield was the 20th edition of the County Antrim Shield, a cup competition in Irish football.

Linfield won the tournament for the 5th time and 2nd consecutive year, defeating Distillery 3–0 in the final at Solitude.

== Results ==
=== Quarter-finals ===
Team 1	Score	Team 2
Distillery	1–1	Cliftonville Olympic
Glentoran	1–1	Cliftonville
Belfast Celtic	bye	
Linfield	bye	

==== Replays ====
Team 1	Score	Team 2
Cliftonville	2–1	Glentoran
Distillery	4–1	Cliftonville Olympic

=== Semi-finals ===
Team 1	Score	Team 2
Distillery	1–1	Cliftonville
Linfield	3–1	Belfast Celtic

==== Replay ====
Team 1	Score	Team 2
Distillery	1–0	Cliftonville

=== Final ===
28 March 1908

Linfield	3–0	Distillery
Mercer 46', 59'; Napier 55'	Report

Solitude, Belfast
Referee: J. Wilson (Broxburn)
