= 1913–14 County Antrim Shield =

Tournament details
- Country: Ireland
- Date: 24 January 1914 – 21 March 1914
- Teams: 6

Final positions
- Champions: Linfield (7th win)
- Runners-up: Glentoran

Tournament statistics
- Matches played: 6
- Goals scored: 21 (3.5 per match)

The 1913–14 County Antrim Shield was the 25th edition of the County Antrim Shield, a cup competition in Irish football.

Linfield won the tournament for the 7th time and 2nd consecutive year, defeating Glentoran 3–2 in the final at Grosvenor Park.

== Results ==
=== Quarter-finals ===
Team 1	Score	Team 2
Belfast Celtic	3–0	Cliftonville Olympic
Distillery	1–2	Glentoran
Cliftonville	bye	
Linfield	bye	

=== Semi-finals ===
Team 1	Score	Team 2
Glentoran	1–1	Cliftonville
Linfield	3–2	Belfast Celtic

==== Replay ====
Team 1	Score	Team 2
Glentoran	2–1	Cliftonville

=== Final ===
21 March 1914

Linfield	3–2	Glentoran
Young (pen.), Clifford	Report	Napier; W. Lindsay

Grosvenor Park, Belfast
Attendance: 20,000
