= 1909–10 County Antrim Shield =

Tournament details
- Country: Ireland
- Date: 29 January 1910 – 2 April 1910
- Teams: 6

Final positions
- Champions: Belfast Celtic (2nd win)
- Runners-up: Glentoran

Tournament statistics
- Matches played: 6
- Goals scored: 24 (4 per match)

The 1909–10 County Antrim Shield was the 22nd edition of the County Antrim Shield, a cup competition in Irish football.

Belfast Celtic won the tournament for the 2nd time, defeating Glentoran 3–1 in the final at Solitude.

== Results ==
=== Quarter-finals ===
Team 1	Score	Team 2
Cliftonville	1–1	Distillery
Glentoran	4–1	Larne
Belfast Celtic	bye	
Linfield	bye	

==== Replay ====
Team 1	Score	Team 2
Distillery	1–2	Cliftonville

=== Semi-finals ===
Team 1	Score	Team 2
Belfast Celtic	3–2	Linfield
Glentoran	3–2	Cliftonville

=== Final ===
2 April 1910

Belfast Celtic	3–1	Glentoran
Davidson; Briggs	Report	Napier

Solitude, Belfast
Attendance: 4,500
Referee: R. S. Lithgow (Glasgow)
