= 1924–25 County Antrim Shield =

Tournament details
- Country: Northern Ireland
- Teams: 11

Final positions
- Champions: Glentoran (7th win)
- Runners-up: Belfast Celtic

Tournament statistics
- Matches played: 13
- Goals scored: 50 (3.85 per match)

The 1924–25 County Antrim Shield was the 36th edition of the County Antrim Shield, a cup competition in Northern Irish football.

Glentoran won the tournament for the 7th time, defeating Belfast Celtic 2–1 in the final at Solitude.

== Results ==
=== First round ===
Team 1	Score	Team 2
Ards	1–3	Cliftonville
Barn	3–1	Ballyclare Comrades
Larne	3–3	Linfield
Ormiston	1–3	Belfast Celtic
Queen's Island	3–1	Distillery
Glentoran	bye	

==== Replays ====
Team 1	Score	Team 2
Linfield	1–2	Larne

=== Quarter-finals ===
Team 1	Score	Team 2
Barn	1–4	Cliftonville
Glentoran	4–1	Queen's Island
Belfast Celtic	bye	
Larne	bye	

=== Semi-finals ===
Team 1	Score	Team 2
Belfast Celtic	1–1	Cliftonville
Glentoran	4–0	Larne

==== Replay ====
Team 1	Score	Team 2
Belfast Celtic	1–1	Cliftonville

==== Second replay ====
Team 1	Score	Team 2
Belfast Celtic	3–1	Cliftonville

=== Final ===
14 February 1925

Glentoran	2–1	Belfast Celtic
Keenan; Meek	Report	Smyth

Solitude, Belfast
