= 1966–67 County Antrim Shield =

Tournament details
- Country: Northern Ireland
- Teams: 12

Final positions
- Champions: Linfield (29th win)
- Runners-up: Crusaders

Tournament statistics
- Matches played: 13
- Goals scored: 46 (3.54 per match)

The 1966–67 County Antrim Shield was the 78th edition of the County Antrim Shield, a cup competition in Northern Irish football.

Linfield won the tournament for the 29th time and 2nd consecutive season, defeating Crusaders 5–3 in the final at The Oval.

== Results ==
=== First round ===
Team 1	Score	Team 2
Ards II	1–0	Cliftonville
Chimney Corner	0–0	Bangor
Glentoran II	2–3	Linfield
Larne	2–0	Ballymena United
Ards	bye	
Crusaders	bye	
Distillery	bye	
Linfield	bye	

==== Replay ====
Team 1	Score	Team 2
Bangor	4–0	Chimney Corner

=== Quarter-finals ===
Team 1	Score	Team 2
Ards	1–2	Glentoran
Crusaders	3–1	Larne
Distillery	1–1	Bangor
Linfield	6–0	Ards II

==== Replay ====
Team 1	Score	Team 2
Bangor	0–2	Distillery

=== Semi-finals ===
Team 1	Score	Team 2
Crusaders	4–2	Distillery
Linfield	2–1	Glentoran

=== Final ===
13 May 1967

Linfield	5–3	Crusaders
Hamilton 39'; Pavis 41', 43', 55', 74'	Report	Meldrum 40'; McNeill 42', 49'

The Oval, Belfast
