= 1965–66 County Antrim Shield =

Tournament details
- Country: Northern Ireland
- Teams: 12

Final positions
- Champions: Linfield (28th win)
- Runners-up: Ballymena United

Tournament statistics
- Matches played: 11
- Goals scored: 39 (3.55 per match)

The 1965–66 County Antrim Shield was the 77th edition of the County Antrim Shield, a cup competition in Northern Irish football.

Linfield won the tournament for the 28th time, defeating Ballymena United 4–0 in the final at Solitude.

== Results ==
=== First round ===
Team 1	Score	Team 2
Cliftonville	3–1	Brantwood
Crusaders	4–2	Larne
Distillery	1–0	Glentoran II
Glentoran	8–0	Chimney Corner
Ards	bye	
Ballymena United	bye	
Bangor	bye	
Linfield	bye	

=== Quarter-finals ===
Team 1	Score	Team 2
Ards	4–0	Bangor
Cliftonville	1–2	Ballymena United
Crusaders	1–0	Distillery
Linfield	3–2	Glentoran

=== Semi-finals ===
Team 1	Score	Team 2
Ballymena United	1–0	Ards
Linfield	2–0	Crusaders

=== Final ===
14 May 1966

Linfield	4–0	Ballymena United
Pavis; Thomas	Report

Solitude, Belfast
