= 1967–68 County Antrim Shield =

Tournament details
- Country: Northern Ireland
- Teams: 12

Final positions
- Champions: Glentoran (15th win)
- Runners-up: Linfield

Tournament statistics
- Matches played: 13
- Goals scored: 43 (3.31 per match)

The 1967–68 County Antrim Shield was the 79th edition of the County Antrim Shield, a cup competition in Northern Irish football.

Glentoran won the tournament for the 15th time, defeating Linfield 3–0 in the final replay at Solitude after the previous final match ended in a 3–3 draw.

== Results ==
=== First round ===
Team 1	Score	Team 2
Ballymena United	3–0	Albert Foundry
Crusaders	2–2	Dundela
Larne	1–0	Cliftonville
Linfield	4–0	Carrick Rangers
Ards	bye	
Bangor	bye	
Distillery	bye	
Glentoran	bye	

==== Replay ====
Team 1	Score	Team 2
Crusaders	0–2	Dundela

=== Quarter-finals ===
Team 1	Score	Team 2
Ards	1–3	Bangor
Distillery	0–6	Glentoran
Larne	1–0	Ballymena United
Linfield	3–0	Dundela

=== Semi-finals ===
Team 1	Score	Team 2
Glentoran	2–1	Bangor
Linfield	3–0	Larne

=== Final ===
11 May 1968

Glentoran	3–3	Linfield
Thompson 18', 40'; Gregg 89' (o.g.)	Report	Hamilton 20', 24'; Scott 66'

Solitude, Belfast
Attendance: 12,000
Referee: W. G. Strange (Carnmoney)

==== Replay ====
13 May 1968

Glentoran	3–0	Linfield
Weatherup 22'; Thompson; Morrow 87'	Report

Solitude, Belfast
Attendance: 12,000
Referee: W. G. Strange (Carnmoney)
