= 1959–60 County Antrim Shield =

Tournament details
- Country: Northern Ireland
- Teams: 12

Final positions
- Champions: Crusaders (1st win)
- Runners-up: Linfield

Tournament statistics
- Matches played: 13
- Goals scored: 46 (3.54 per match)

The 1959–60 County Antrim Shield was the 71st edition of the County Antrim Shield, a cup competition in Northern Irish football.

Crusaders won the tournament for the 1st time, defeating Linfield 2–0 in the final replay at Solitude after the original final ended in a 2–2 draw.

== Results ==
=== First round ===
Team 1	Score	Team 2
Crusaders Reserves	1–1	Cliftonville
Glentoran II	1–0	Ards
Larne	4–1	Glentoran
Linfield	2–0	Ards II
Ballymena United	bye	
Bangor	bye	
Crusaders	bye	
Distillery	bye	

==== Replay ====
Team 1	Score	Team 2
Cliftonville	2–4	Crusaders Reserves

=== Quarter-finals ===
Team 1	Score	Team 2
Bangor	1–2	Linfield
Crusaders	4–2	Distillery
Crusaders Reserves	2–1	Larne
Glentoran II	1–0	Ballymena United

=== Semi-finals ===
Team 1	Score	Team 2
Crusaders	3–2	Crusaders Reserves
Linfield	5–1	Glentoran II

=== Final ===
14 May 1960

Crusaders	2–2	Linfield
Wilson 44'; Pavis 81'	Report	Stewart 63'; Milburn 74'

Solitude, Belfast

==== Replay ====
17 May 1960

Crusaders	2–0	Linfield
Pavis 62'; Creighton 86'	Report

Solitude, Belfast
Referee: S. Cummings
