= 1948–49 County Antrim Shield =

Tournament details
- Country: Northern Ireland
- Teams: 10

Final positions
- Champions: Linfield Swifts (1st win)
- Runners-up: Bangor

Tournament statistics
- Matches played: 13
- Goals scored: 53 (4.08 per match)

The 1948–49 County Antrim Shield was the 60th edition of the County Antrim Shield, a cup competition in Northern Irish football.

Linfield Swifts (the reserve team of Linfield) won the tournament for the 1st time, defeating Bangor 4–1 in the second final replay at Grosvenor Park.

== Results ==
=== First round ===
Team 1	Score	Team 2
Distillery	1–1	Linfield Swifts
Linfield	2–2	Brantwood
Ards	bye	
Ballymena United	bye	
Bangor	bye	
Belfast Celtic	bye	
Cliftonville	bye	
Glentoran	bye	
Linfield	bye	

==== Replays ====
Team 1	Score	Team 2
Linfield Swifts	4–0	Distillery
Linfield	2–2	Brantwood

==== Second replay ====
Team 1	Score	Team 2
Linfield	1–2	Brantwood

=== Quarter-finals ===
Team 1	Score	Team 2
Bangor	4–2	Brantwood
Belfast Celtic	2–1	Ards
Glentoran	1–0	Ballymena United
Linfield Swifts	4–2	Cliftonville

=== Semi-finals ===
Team 1	Score	Team 2
Bangor	3–0	Glentoran
Linfield Swifts	w/o^{1}	Belfast Celtic

^{1}Linfield Swifts progressed to the final after Belfast Celtic withdrew from the competition.

=== Final ===
7 May 1949

Linfield Swifts	2–2	Bangor
Graham 14'; Dickson 44'	Report	Forsythe 40'; Taylor 60'

Grosvenor Park, Belfast
Attendance: 10,000
Referee: T. Mitchell

==== Replay ====
14 May 1949

Linfield Swifts	3–3	Bangor
	Report

Grosvenor Park, Belfast

==== Second replay ====
20 May 1949

Linfield Swifts	4–1	Bangor
Mackey 23'; Dickson 44'; Houston 49' (pen.); Graham 66'	Report	Forsythe 17'

Grosvenor Park, Belfast
Attendance: 10,000
