= 1934–35 County Antrim Shield =

Tournament details
- Country: Northern Ireland
- Teams: 11

Final positions
- Champions: Linfield (17th win)
- Runners-up: Belfast Celtic II

Tournament statistics
- Matches played: 14
- Goals scored: 56 (4 per match)

The 1934–35 County Antrim Shield was the 46th edition of the County Antrim Shield, a cup competition in Northern Irish football.

Linfield won the tournament for the 17th time and 4th consecutive season, defeating Belfast Celtic II (Belfast Celtic's reserve team) 4–2 in the final at Solitude.

== Results ==
=== First round ===
Team 1	Score	Team 2
Cliftonville	1–2	Bangor
Distillery	2–2	Linfield
Glentoran	5–0	Crusaders
Ards	bye	
Ballymena United	bye	
Belfast Celtic	bye	
Belfast Celtic II	bye	
Larne	bye	

==== Replay ====
Team 1	Score	Team 2
Linfield	2–2	Distillery

==== Second replay ====
Team 1	Score	Team 2
Distillery	1–2	Linfield

=== Quarter-finals ===
Team 1	Score	Team 2
Belfast Celtic II	4–2	Ards
Glentoran	5–0	Bangor
Larne	2–4	Ballymena United
Linfield	1–1	Belfast Celtic

==== Replay ====
Team 1	Score	Team 2
Belfast Celtic	0–3	Linfield

=== Semi-finals ===
Team 1	Score	Team 2
Belfast Celtic II	5–0	Glentoran
Linfield	4–0	Ballymena United

=== Final ===
17 April 1935

Linfield	4–2	Belfast Celtic II
Allison 5'; Jones 57', 89'; McCleery 73'; Ruddy (red card) 66'	Report	Kelly 20'; McGivern 62'; J. McAlinden (red card) 35'; Ritchie (red card) 66'; Kelly (red card) 78'

Solitude, Belfast
