= 1888–89 County Antrim Shield =

Tournament details
- Country: Ireland
- Date: 3 November 1888 – 3 March 1889
- Teams: 10

Final positions
- Champions: Distillery (1st win)
- Runners-up: YMCA

Tournament statistics
- Matches played: 8
- Goals scored: 55 (6.88 per match)

The 1888–89 County Antrim Shield was the inaugural edition of the County Antrim Shield, a cup competition in Irish football.

Distillery won the tournament for the first time, defeating YMCA 8–4 in the final.

== Results ==
=== First round ===
Team 1	Score	Team 2
Ballyclare	w/o	Oldpark
Belfast Athletics	1–8	Distillery
Distillery Rovers	w/o	YMCA
Linfield Athletic	2–2	Cliftonville
Whiteabbey	2–4	Clarence

==== Replay ====
Team 1	Score	Team 2
Cliftonville	0–4	Linfield Athletic

=== Second round ===
Team 1	Score	Team 2
Distillery	4–3	Linfield Athletic
Clarence	bye	
Oldpark	bye	
YMCA	bye	

=== Semi-finals ===
Team 1	Score	Team 2
YMCA	5–0	Oldpark
Distillery	7–1	Clarence

=== Final ===
30 March 1889

Distillery	8–4	YMCA
Stanfield; McIlvenny; R. Stewart ? ? ?	Report	Percy; Miller; Lemon

Ulster Cricket Ground, Belfast
Attendance: 8,000
