= 1927–28 County Antrim Shield =

Tournament details
- Country: Northern Ireland
- Teams: 12

Final positions
- Champions: Linfield (11th win)
- Runners-up: Ards

Tournament statistics
- Matches played: 16
- Goals scored: 65 (4.06 per match)

The 1927–28 County Antrim Shield was the 39th edition of the County Antrim Shield, a cup competition in Northern Irish football.

Linfield won the tournament for the 11th time, defeating Ards 4–2 in the final replay at Solitude, after the original final ended in a 1–1 draw.

== Results ==
=== First round ===
| Team 1 | Score | Team 2 |
|---|---|---|
| Belfast Celtic | 4–0 | Cliftonville |
| Larne | 2–1 | Barn |
| Ormiston | 3–3 | Queen's Island |
| Willowfield | 1–2 | Distillery |
| Ards | bye | |
| Bangor | bye | |
| Glentoran | bye | |
| Linfield | bye | |

==== Replay ====
| Team 1 | Score | Team 2 |
|---|---|---|
| Queen's Island | 1–2 | Ormiston |

=== Quarter-finals ===
| Team 1 | Score | Team 2 |
|---|---|---|
| Bangor | 3–1 | Larne |
| Glentoran | 5–3 | Distillery |
| Linfield | 3–3 | Belfast Celtic |
| Ormiston | 2–2 | Ards |

==== Replays ====
| Team 1 | Score | Team 2 |
|---|---|---|
| Ards | 4–1 | Ormiston |
| Belfast Celtic | 1–2 | Linfield |

=== Semi-finals ===
| Team 1 | Score | Team 2 |
|---|---|---|
| Ards | 2–1 | Glentoran |
| Bangor | 0–0 | Linfield |

==== Replay ====
| Team 1 | Score | Team 2 |
|---|---|---|
| Bangor | 2–3 | Linfield |

=== Final ===
24 April 1928

| Linfield | 1–1 | Ards |
|---|---|---|
| McCracken 9' | Report | R. Flynn 82' |

Solitude, Belfast
Referee: Mr W. McLean

==== Replay ====
2 May 1928

| Linfield | 4–2 | Ards |
|---|---|---|
| Somerset 40'; Bambrick 52', 75'; McCracken 85' | Report | Jackson 15'; McGee 87' |

Solitude, Belfast
Referee: Mr W. McLean
