= County Antrim Shield =

Football tournament in Northern Ireland

- Organiser(s): County Antrim & District F.A.
- Founded: 1888
- Region: Northern Ireland
- Current champions: Carrick Rangers (2025–26)
- Most championships: Linfield (43 titles)
- Website: County Antrim F.A.

The County Antrim & District Football Association Senior Shield (more commonly known as the County Antrim Shield) is a football competition in Northern Ireland. The competition is open to senior teams who are members of the North East Ulster Football Association (also known as the County Antrim & District Football Association) (membership of which extends geographically beyond County Antrim itself), often plus intermediate teams who qualify via the Steel & Sons Cup, depending on the numbers required. For the 2010–11 and 2011-12 seasons, only the winners took part.

The current Shield holders are Carrick Rangers, who beat Cliftonville 4-2 on penalties in the 2025–26 final, winning the trophy for the first time since the 1992–93 season.

== History ==
The County Antrim & District Football Association was founded on April 23, 1888 by the clubs Ballyclare, Beechmount, Belfast Athletic, Clarence, Cliftonville, Distillery, Linfield, Mountcollyer, Oldpark, Whiteabbey and YMCA. The County Antrim FA has organised the competition for the County Antrim Shield annually ever since. Originally only clubs from County Antrim (to which most but not all of Belfast belonged) could enter; in 1896 it was extended to incorporate clubs from south east Belfast (in particular Glentoran and Ulster), which belonged to County Down (other clubs from County Down to have entered later on include Ards, Bangor and Newry City). Glenavon from Lurgan (County Armagh) first entered in 1912. In 1971/72 and 1972/73, the final was played over 2 legs.

During the later 1980s and early 1990s, the North East Ulster F.A. invited senior clubs from outside its jurisdiction to participate. Hence the Shield has been won by Newry Town (later Newry City) and Glenavon, neither of which are members of the North East Ulster Football Association.

The Shield has been regularly sponsored since the late 1980s. The 2014–15 competition was sponsored by Toals Bookmakers.

== Final results ==
Key:

	Scores level after 90 minutes. A replay was required.
(a.e.t.)	Scores level after extra time. A replay was required.
(a.e.t.)	Scores level after 90 minutes. Winner was decided in extra time with no penalty shootout required.
(a.e.t.) (g.g.)	Scores level after 90 minutes. Winner was decided in extra time by golden goal.
(a.e.t.) pens.	Scores level after extra time. A penalty shootout was required to determine the winner.
pens.	Scores level after 90 minutes. A penalty shootout was required to determine the winner.
	Two-legged final. Aggregate score across two legs determined the winner with a penalty shootout required if score was level.

#	Season	Winner (number of titles)	Score	Runner-up	Venue
1	1888–89	Distillery (1)	8 – 4	YMCA	Ulster Cricket Ground, Belfast
	1889–90		Shield not awarded (Note: Linfield were leading the final 5–3 when the match was abandoned due to crowd trouble and awarding of the Shield was withheld. Linfield resigned from the County Antrim FA in protest.)
2	1890–91	Black Watch (1)	4 – 2	Oldpark	Solitude, Belfast
3	1891–92	Cliftonville (1)	2 – 1	Lancashire Fusiliers	Solitude, Belfast
4	1892–93	Distillery (2)	2 – 1	Celtic	Grosvenor Park, Belfast
5	1893–94	Cliftonville (2)	2 – 1	Celtic	Grosvenor Park, Belfast
6	1894–95	Celtic (1)	3 – 1	Distillery	Solitude, Belfast
7	1895–96	Distillery (3)	5 – 0	Linfield	Solitude, Belfast
8	1896–97	Distillery (4)	2 – 2	Linfield	Solitude, Belfast
8	Replay	Distillery (4)	3 – 1	Linfield	Solitude, Belfast
9	1897–98	Cliftonville (3)	2 – 0	Linfield	Grosvenor Park, Belfast
10	1898–99	Linfield (1)	1 – 1	Linfield Swifts	Solitude, Belfast
10	Replay	Linfield (1)	4 – 0	Linfield Swifts	Solitude, Belfast
11	1899–1900	Distillery (5)	0 – 0	Linfield	Solitude, Belfast
11	Replay	Distillery (5)	2 – 0	Linfield	Solitude, Belfast
12	1900–01	Glentoran (1)	2 – 1	Cliftonville	Myrtlefield, Belfast
13	1901–02	Glentoran (2)	2 – 1	Distillery	Solitude, Belfast
14	1902–03	Distillery (6)	1 – 1	Linfield	Solitude, Belfast
14	Replay	Distillery (6)	4 – 1	Linfield	Solitude, Belfast
15	1903–04	Linfield (2)	4 – 1	Belfast Celtic	Solitude, Belfast
16	1904–05	Distillery (7)	2 – 0	Linfield	Solitude, Belfast
17	1905–06	Linfield (3)	1 – 1	Distillery	Solitude, Belfast
17	Replay	Linfield (3)	2 – 0	Distillery	Windsor Park, Belfast
18	1906–07	Linfield (4)	2 – 0	Glentoran	Solitude, Belfast
19	1907–08	Linfield (5)	3 – 0	Distillery	Solitude, Belfast
20	1908–09	Glentoran II (1)	3 – 0	Cliftonville	Celtic Park, Belfast
21	1909–10	Belfast Celtic (2)	3 – 1	Glentoran	Solitude, Belfast
22	1910–11	Glentoran (3)	2 – 0	Cliftonville	Celtic Park, Belfast
	1911–12		Tournament not held (Note: The senior clubs refused to compete for the competition due to a dispute with the Irish Football Association.)
23	1912–13	Linfield (6)	0 – 0	Cliftonville	Celtic Park, Belfast
23	Replay	Linfield (6)	0 – 0	Cliftonville	Grosvenor Park, Belfast
23	2nd replay	Linfield (6)	1 – 0 (a.e.t.)	Cliftonville	The Oval, Belfast
24	1913–14	Linfield (7)	3 – 2	Glentoran	Grosvenor Park, Belfast
25	1914–15	Distillery (8)	1 – 0	Glentoran	Windsor Park, Belfast
26	1915–16	Glentoran (4)	1 – 0	Distillery	Solitude, Belfast
27	1916–17	Linfield (8)	3 – 0	Glentoran	Celtic Park, Belfast
28	1917–18	Glentoran (5)	2 – 0	Linfield	Grosvenor Park, Belfast
29	1918–19	Distillery (9)	0 – 0	Belfast Celtic	The Oval, Belfast
29	Replay	Distillery (9)	1 – 0	Belfast Celtic	Windsor Park, Belfast
30	1919–20	Distillery (10)	0 – 0	Belfast Celtic	Windsor Park, Belfast
30	Replay	Distillery (10)	2 – 0	Belfast Celtic	Solitude, Belfast
31	1920–21	Glentoran (6)	1 – 1	Distillery	Solitude, Belfast
31	Replay	Glentoran (6)	0 – 0	Distillery	Windsor Park, Belfast
31	2nd replay	Glentoran (6)	0 – 0	Distillery	Solitude, Belfast
31	3rd replay	Glentoran (6)	2 – 0	Distillery	Windsor Park, Belfast
32	1921–22	Linfield (9)	1 – 1	Distillery	The Oval, Belfast
32	Replay	Linfield (9)	4 – 1	Distillery	Solitude, Belfast
33	1922–23	Linfield (10)	4 – 1	Glentoran	Solitude, Belfast
34	1923–24	Queen's Island (1)	3 – 0	Distillery	Windsor Park, Belfast
35	1924–25	Glentoran (7)	2 – 1	Belfast Celtic	Solitude, Belfast
36	1925–26	Cliftonville (4)	5 – 1	Glentoran	Windsor Park, Belfast
37	1926–27	Belfast Celtic (3)	3 – 2	Dunmurry	Solitude, Belfast
38	1927–28	Linfield (11)	1 – 1	Ards	Solitude, Belfast
38	Replay	Linfield (11)	4 – 1	Ards	Solitude, Belfast
39	1928–29	Linfield (12)	2 – 1	Broadway United	Grosvenor Park, Belfast
40	1929–30	Linfield (13)	3 – 1	Glentoran	Solitude, Belfast
41	1930–31	Glentoran (8)	2 – 1	Cliftonville	Grosvenor Park, Belfast
42	1931–32	Linfield (14)	5 – 1	Belfast Celtic	The Oval, Belfast
43	1932–33	Linfield (15)	1 – 1	Belfast Celtic	Solitude, Belfast
43	Replay	Linfield (15)	1 – 1	Belfast Celtic	Solitude, Belfast
43	2nd replay	Linfield (15)	3 – 1	Belfast Celtic	Solitude, Belfast
44	1933–34	Linfield (16)	7 – 1	Ards	Grosvenor Park, Belfast
45	1934–35	Linfield (17)	4 – 2	Belfast Celtic II	Solitude, Belfast
46	1935–36	Belfast Celtic (4)	1 – 0	Belfast Celtic II	Windsor Park, Belfast
47	1936–37	Belfast Celtic (5)	2 – 2	Glentoran	Grosvenor Park, Belfast
47	Replay	Belfast Celtic (5)	1 – 0	Glentoran	Grosvenor Park, Belfast
48	1937–38	Linfield (18)	3 – 2	Ballymena United	Grosvenor Park, Belfast
49	1938–39	Belfast Celtic (6)	2 – 1	Glentoran	Grosvenor Park, Belfast
50	1939–40	Glentoran (9)	4 – 0	Linfield	Solitude, Belfast
51	1940–41	Glentoran (10)	1 – 0	Distillery	Windsor Park, Belfast
52	1941–42	Linfield (19)	2 – 0	Larne	Grosvenor Park, Belfast
53	1942–43	Belfast Celtic (7)	0 – 0	Linfield	Solitude, Belfast
53	Replay	Belfast Celtic (7)	2 – 2	Linfield	Solitude, Belfast
53	2nd replay	Belfast Celtic (7)	2 – 1	Linfield	Solitude, Belfast
54	1943–44	Glentoran (11)	3 – 0	Belfast Celtic	Solitude, Belfast
55	1944–45	Belfast Celtic (8)	0 – 0	Linfield	Grosvenor Park, Belfast
55	Replay	Belfast Celtic (8)	1 – 0	Linfield	Solitude, Belfast
56	1945–46	Distillery (11)	1 – 1	Bangor Reserves	Windsor Park, Belfast
56	Replay	Distillery (11)	3 – 0	Bangor Reserves	Windsor Park, Belfast
	1946–47	Linfield (20)	Walkover (Note: Linfield were awarded the Shield after Belfast Celtic would not agree on a date for the final.)	Belfast Celtic
57	1947–48	Ballymena United (1)	2 – 1	Linfield	Celtic Park, Belfast
58	1948–49	Linfield Swifts (1)	2 – 2	Bangor	Grosvenor Park, Belfast
58	Replay	Linfield Swifts (1)	3 – 3	Bangor	Grosvenor Park, Belfast
58	2nd replay	Linfield Swifts (1)	4 – 1	Bangor	Grosvenor Park, Belfast
59	1949–50	Glentoran (12)	2 – 0	Linfield	Solitude, Belfast
60	1950–51	Ballymena United (2)	2 – 2	Cliftonville	Windsor Park, Belfast
60	Replay	Ballymena United (2)	3 – 0	Cliftonville	Windsor Park, Belfast
61	1951–52	Glentoran (13)	3 – 0	Brantwood	Solitude, Belfast
62	1952–53	Linfield (21)	2 – 2	Distillery	Solitude, Belfast
62	Replay	Linfield (21)	4 – 4 (a.e.t)	Distillery	Solitude, Belfast
62	2nd replay	Linfield (21)	2 – 1	Distillery	Solitude, Belfast
63	1953–54	Distillery (12)	1 – 0	Ballymena United	Solitude, Belfast
64	1954–55	Linfield (22)	3 – 0	Crusaders	Solitude, Belfast
65	1955–56	Ards (1)	4 – 1	Linfield	The Oval, Belfast
66	1956–57	Glentoran (14)	0 – 0	Distillery	Solitude, Belfast
66	Replay	Glentoran (14)	4 – 0	Distillery	Solitude, Belfast
67	1957–58	Linfield (23)	3 – 1	Distillery	Solitude, Belfast
68	1958–59	Linfield (24)	3 – 1	Bangor	Solitude, Belfast
69	1959–60	Crusaders (1)	2 – 2	Linfield	Solitude, Belfast
69	Replay	Crusaders (1)	2 – 0	Linfield	Solitude, Belfast
70	1960–61	Linfield (25)	2 – 1	Glentoran	Solitude, Belfast
71	1961–62	Linfield (26)	5 – 0	Glentoran	Solitude, Belfast
72	1962–63	Linfield (27)	4 – 0	Bangor	Solitude, Belfast
73	1963–64	Distillery (13)	2 – 1	Glentoran	Solitude, Belfast
74	1964–65	Crusaders (2)	6 – 0	Larne	The Oval, Belfast
75	1965–66	Linfield (28)	4 – 0	Ballymena United	Solitude, Belfast
76	1966–67	Linfield (29)	5 – 3	Crusaders	The Oval, Belfast
77	1967–68	Glentoran (15)	3 – 3	Linfield	Solitude, Belfast
77	Replay	Glentoran (15)	3 – 0	Linfield	Solitude, Belfast
78	1968–69	Crusaders (3)	2 – 1	Linfield	Solitude, Belfast
79	1969–70	Bangor (1)	1 – 1	Ards	Solitude, Belfast
79	Replay	Bangor (1)	1 – 1	Ards	Solitude, Belfast
79	2nd replay	Bangor (1)	1 – 1 (a.e.t.)	Ards	Solitude, Belfast
79	3rd replay	Bangor (1)	3 – 2	Ards	Solitude, Belfast
80	1970–71	Glentoran (16)	2 – 1	Crusaders	Solitude, Belfast
81	1971–72	Ards (2)	3 – 0	Crusaders	Castlereagh Park, Newtownards
81	1971–72	Ards (2)	0 – 3 (3 – 3 agg.) (5 – 4 pens.)	Crusaders	Seaview, Belfast
82	1972–73	Linfield (30)	4 – 1	Bangor	Windsor Park, Belfast
82	1972–73	Linfield (30)	5 – 0 (9 – 1 agg.)	Bangor	Clandeboye Park, Bangor
83	1973–74	Crusaders (4)	2 – 1	Larne	Inver Park, Larne
84	1974–75	Bangor (2)	2 – 1	Glentoran	The Oval, Belfast
85	1975–76	Ballymena United (3)	4 – 0	Distillery	Inver Park, Larne
86	1976–77	Linfield (31)	3 – 1	Glentoran	Windsor Park, Belfast
87	1977–78	Glentoran (17)	1 – 0	Crusaders	Windsor Park, Belfast
88	1978–79	Cliftonville (5)	0 – 0 (a.e.t.) (3 – 1 pens.)	Crusaders	Seaview, Belfast
89	1979–80	Ballymena United (4)	0 – 0 (a.e.t.) (3 – 1 pens.)	Crusaders	The Oval, Belfast
90	1980–81	Linfield (32)	4 – 1	Glentoran	Windsor Park, Belfast
91	1981–82	Linfield (33)	1 – 0	Distillery	Seaview, Belfast
92	1982–83	Linfield (34)	4 – 1	Glentoran	Windsor Park, Belfast
93	1983–84	Linfield (35)	3 – 1	Crusaders	Seaview, Belfast
94	1984–85	Glentoran (18)	2 – 1	Crusaders	The Oval, Belfast
95	1985–86	Distillery (14)	3 – 1	Ballymena United	The Oval, Belfast
96	1986–87	Glentoran (19)	3 – 0	Glenavon	The Oval, Belfast
97	1987–88	Newry Town (1)	2 – 1	Ballymena United	The Oval, Belfast
98	1988–89	Bangor (3)	2 – 1 (a.e.t.)	Glentoran	Seaview, Belfast
99	1989–90	Glentoran (20)	0 – 0 (a.e.t.) (6 – 5 pens.)	Linfield	The Oval, Belfast
100	1990–91	Glenavon (1)	4 – 3	Newry Town	New Grosvenor Stadium, Ballyskeagh
101	1991–92	Crusaders (5)	2 – 1	Glenavon	The Oval, Belfast
102	1992–93	Carrick Rangers (1)	1 – 1 (a.e.t.)	Glentoran	Windsor Park, Belfast
102	Replay	Carrick Rangers (1)	2 – 1	Glentoran	Windsor Park, Belfast
103	1993–94	Ards (3)	4 – 2	Crusaders	The Oval, Belfast
104	1994–95	Linfield (36)	4 – 0	Glenavon	The Oval, Belfast
105	1995–96	Glenavon (2)	3 – 0	Crusaders	The Oval, Belfast
106	1996–97	Cliftonville (6)	0 – 0 (Note: The final was replayed after the first match was abandoned due to crowd disorder.)	Ballymena United	Windsor Park, Belfast
106	1996–97	Cliftonville (6)	0 – 0 (a.e.t.) (5 – 4 pens.)	Ballymena United	Windsor Park, Belfast
107	1997–98	Linfield (37)	1 – 0 (a.e.t.) (g.g.)	Crusaders	The Oval, Belfast
108	1998–99	Glentoran (21)	2 – 0	Cliftonville	Windsor Park, Belfast
109	1999–2000	Glentoran (22)	2 – 1	Bangor	Castlereagh Park, Newtownards
110	2000–01	Linfield (38)	2 – 1	Glentoran	Windsor Park, Belfast
111	2001–02	Glentoran (23)	2 – 0	Linfield	The Oval, Belfast
112	2002–03	Glentoran (24)	3 – 0	Ballymena United	The Oval, Belfast
113	2003–04	Linfield (39)	2 – 0	Ards	The Oval, Belfast
114	2004–05	Linfield (40)	2 – 1 (a.e.t.)	Crusaders	The Oval, Belfast
115	2005–06	Linfield (41)	2 – 1	Ballymena United	Seaview, Belfast
116	2006–07	Cliftonville (7)	2 – 1	Lisburn Distillery	The Oval, Belfast
117	2007–08	Glentoran (25)	2 – 1	Crusaders	Windsor Park, Belfast
118	2008–09	Cliftonville (8)	2 – 1	Linfield	Windsor Park, Belfast
119	2009–10	Crusaders (6)	3 – 2 (a.e.t.)	Linfield	Windsor Park, Belfast
120	2010–11	Glentoran (26)	3 – 1	Linfield	Windsor Park, Belfast
121	2011–12	Cliftonville (9)	2 – 1	Glentoran	The Oval, Belfast
122	2012–13	Ballymena United (5)	1 – 1 (a.e.t.) (4 – 3 pens.)	Linfield	The Oval, Belfast
123	2013–14	Linfield (42)	0 – 0 (a.e.t.) (4 – 1 pens.)	Crusaders	The Showgrounds, Ballymena
124	2014–15	Cliftonville (10)	1 – 0	Bangor	Solitude, Belfast
125	2015–16	Ballymena United (6)	3 – 2	Linfield	Windsor Park, Belfast
126	2016–17	Linfield (43)	3 – 1	Crusaders	The Showgrounds, Ballymena
127	2017–18	Crusaders (7)	4 – 2	Ballymena United	The Showgrounds, Ballymena
128	2018–19	Crusaders (8)	4 – 3	Linfield	Seaview, Belfast
129	2019–20	Cliftonville (11)	2 – 1	Ballymena United	Windsor Park, Belfast
130	2020–21	Larne (1)	0 – 0 (4 – 3 pens.)	Glentoran	Seaview, Belfast
131	2021–22	Larne (2)	1 – 0	Linfield	Seaview, Belfast
132	2022–23	Larne (3)	0 – 0 (4 – 3 pens.)	Linfield	Seaview, Belfast
133	2023–24	Larne (4)	2 – 1	Glentoran	Seaview, Belfast
134	2024–25	Glentoran (27)	1 – 1 (5 – 4 pens.)	Larne	Seaview, Belfast
135	2025–26	Carrick Rangers (2)	1 – 1 (4 – 2 pens.)	Cliftonville	Seaview, Belfast

== Performance by club ==
Club	Winners	Runners-up	Winning years	Runners-up years
Linfield	43	26	1898–99, 1903–04, 1905–06, 1906–07, 1907–08, 1912–13, 1913–14, 1916–17, 1921–22, 1922–23, 1927–28, 1928–29, 1929–30, 1931–32, 1932–33, 1933–34, 1934–35, 1937–38, 1941–42, 1946–47, 1952–53, 1954–55, 1957–58, 1958–59, 1960–61, 1961–62, 1962–63, 1965–66, 1966–67, 1972–73, 1976–77, 1980–81, 1981–82, 1982–83, 1983–84, 1994–95, 1997–98, 2000–01, 2003–04, 2004–05, 2005–06, 2013–14, 2016–17	1895–96, 1896–97, 1897–98, 1899–1900, 1902–03, 1904–05, 1917–18, 1939–40, 1942–43, 1944–45, 1947–48, 1949–50, 1955–56, 1959–60, 1967–68, 1968–69, 1989–90, 2001–02, 2008–09, 2009–10, 2010–11, 2012–13, 2015–16, 2018–19, 2021–22, 2022–23
Glentoran	27	23	1900–01, 1901–02, 1910–11, 1915–16, 1917–18, 1920–21, 1924–25, 1930–31, 1939–40, 1940–41, 1943–44, 1949–50, 1951–52, 1956–57, 1967–68, 1970–71, 1977–78, 1984–85, 1986–87, 1989–90, 1998–99, 1999–2000, 2001–02, 2002–03, 2007–08, 2010–11, 2024–25	1906–07, 1909–10, 1913–14, 1914–15, 1916–17, 1922–23, 1925–26, 1929–30, 1936–37, 1938–39, 1960–61, 1961–62, 1963–64, 1974–75, 1976–77, 1980–81, 1982–83, 1988–89, 1992–93, 2000–01, 2011–12, 2020–21, 2023–24
Lisburn Distillery	14	16	1888–89, 1892–93, 1895–96, 1896–97, 1899–1900, 1902–03, 1904–05, 1914–15, 1918–19, 1919–20, 1945–46, 1953–54, 1963–64, 1985–86	1889–90, 1894–95, 1901–02, 1905–06, 1907–08, 1915–16, 1920–21, 1921–22, 1923–24, 1940–41, 1952–53, 1956–57, 1957–58, 1975–76, 1981–82, 2006–07
Cliftonville	11	8	1891–92, 1893–94, 1897–98, 1925–26, 1978–79, 1996–97, 2006–07, 2008–09, 2011–12, 2014–15, 2019–20	1900–01, 1908–09, 1910–11, 1912–13, 1930–31, 1950–51, 1998–99, 2025–26
Crusaders	8	16	1959–60, 1964–65, 1968–69, 1973–74, 1991–92, 2009–10, 2017–18, 2018–19	1954–55, 1966–67, 1970–71, 1971–72, 1977–78, 1978–79, 1979–80, 1983–84, 1984–85, 1993–94, 1995–96, 1997–98, 2004–05, 2007–08, 2013–14, 2016–17
Belfast Celtic	8	10	1894–95, 1909–10, 1926–27, 1935–36, 1936–37, 1938–39, 1942–43, 1944–45	1892–93, 1893–94, 1903–04, 1918–19, 1919–20, 1924–25, 1931–32, 1932–33, 1943–44, 1946–47
Ballymena United	6	10	1947–48, 1950–51, 1975–76, 1979–80, 2012–13, 2015–16	1937–38, 1953–54, 1965–66, 1985–86, 1987–88, 1996–97, 2002–03, 2005–06, 2017–18, 2019–20
Larne	4	4	2020–21, 2021–22, 2022–23, 2023–24	1941–42, 1964–65, 1973–74, 2024–25
Bangor	3	6	1969–70, 1974–75, 1988–89	1948–49, 1958–59, 1962–63, 1972–73, 1999–2000, 2014–15
Ards	3	4	1955–56, 1971–72, 1993–94	1927–28, 1933–34, 1969–70, 2003–04
Glenavon	2	3	1990–91, 1995–96	1986–87, 1991–92, 1994–95
Carrick Rangers	2	0	1992–93, 2025–26	–
Linfield Swifts	1	1	1948–49	1898–99
Newry Town	1	1	1987–88	1990–91
Black Watch	1	0	1890–91	–
Glentoran II	1	0	1908–09	–
Queen's Island	1	0	1923–24	–
Belfast Celtic II	0	2	–	1934–35, 1935–36
YMCA	0	1	–	1888–89
Oldpark	0	1	–	1890–91
Lancashire Fusiliers	0	1	–	1891–92
Linfield Swifts	0	1	–	1898–99
Dunmurry	0	1	–	1926–27
Broadway United	0	1	–	1928–29
Bangor Reserves	0	1	–	1945–46
Brantwood	0	1	–	1951–52

== Centenary Chalice ==
To mark the centenary of the County Antrim F.A., a Centenary Chalice was played for in 1987–88. Glentoran won it, defeating Ballymena United 4–2 in the final.
