= 1941–42 County Antrim Shield =

Tournament details
- Country: Northern Ireland
- Teams: 13

Final positions
- Champions: Linfield (19th win)
- Runners-up: Larne

Tournament statistics
- Matches played: 14
- Goals scored: 72 (5.14 per match)

The 1941–42 County Antrim Shield was the 53rd edition of the County Antrim Shield, a cup competition in Northern Irish football.

Linfield won the tournament for the 19th time, defeating Larne 2–0 in the final at Grosvenor Park.

== Results ==
=== First round ===
Team 1	Score	Team 2
Bangor Reserves	4–4	Larne Olympic
Belfast Celtic	3–3	Distillery
Belfast Celtic II	2–0	Glentoran
Cliftonville	0–7	Linfield
Royal Inniskilling Fusiliers	8–4	Royal Ulster Rifles
Ards	bye	
Larne	bye	
Royal Irish Fusiliers	bye	

==== Replay ====
Team 1	Score	Team 2
Belfast Celtic	3–1	Distillery
Larne Olympic	3–1	Bangor Reserves

=== Quarter-finals ===
Team 1	Score	Team 2
Belfast Celtic	5–2	Ards
Belfast Celtic II	2–1	Royal Inniskilling Fusiliers
Larne	2–1	Royal Irish Fusiliers
Linfield	8–1	Larne Olympic

=== Semi-finals ===
Team 1	Score	Team 2
Linfield	1–0	Belfast Celtic
Larne	3–1	Belfast Celtic II

=== Final ===
25 April 1942

Linfield	2–0	Larne
Baker 40'; McKeown 44'	Report

Grosvenor Park, Belfast
Referee: Mr S. Eaton
