= 1895–96 County Antrim Shield =

Tournament details
- Country: Ireland
- Date: 18 January 1896 – 21 March 1896
- Teams: 8

Final positions
- Champions: Distillery (3rd win)
- Runners-up: Linfield

Tournament statistics
- Matches played: 7
- Goals scored: 41 (5.86 per match)

The 1895–96 County Antrim Shield was the 8th edition of the County Antrim Shield, a cup competition in Irish football.

Distillery won the tournament for the 3rd time, defeating Linfield 5–0 in the final.

== Results ==
=== Quarter-finals ===
Team 1	Score	Team 2
Celtic	1–4	Linfield
Distillery	4–1	Linfield Swifts
Ligoniel	1–7	Cliftonville
Milltown	6–1	North Staffordshire Regiment

=== Semi-finals ===
Team 1	Score	Team 2
Distillery	4–3	Cliftonville
Linfield	4–0	Milltown

=== Final ===
21 March 1896

Distillery	5–0	Linfield
McArthur; Stanfield; Baird; Peden	Report

Solitude, Belfast
Attendance: 5,000
