= 1987–88 County Antrim Shield =

Tournament details
- Country: Northern Ireland
- Teams: 12

Final positions
- Champions: Newry Town (1st win)
- Runners-up: Ballymena United

Tournament statistics
- Matches played: 11
- Goals scored: 25 (2.27 per match)

The 1987–88 County Antrim Shield was the 99th edition of the County Antrim Shield, a cup competition in Northern Irish football.

Newry Town won the tournament for the 1st time, defeating Ballymena United 2–1 in the final. For the 2nd year running the County Antrim FA invited three clubs from County Armagh to compete (Glenavon, Newry Town and Portadown).

== Results ==
=== First round ===
Team 1	Score	Team 2
Ballyclare Comrades	2–0	Bangor
Larne	2–2 (a.e.t.) (5–6 p)	Glentoran
Linfield	2–1	Glenavon
Newry Town	1–0	Carrick Rangers
Ballymena United	bye	
Cliftonville	bye	
Killyleagh Youth	bye	
Portadown	bye	

=== Quarter-finals ===
Team 1	Score	Team 2
Cliftonville	0–1	Ballymena United
Glentoran	3–1	Linfield
Newry Town	4–0	Ballyclare Comrades
Portadown	0–0 (a.e.t.) (3–4 p)	Killyleagh Youth

=== Semi-finals ===
Team 1	Score	Team 2
Glentoran	0–1	Ballymena United
Newry Town	2–0	Killyleagh Youth

=== Final ===
25 November 1987

Newry Town	2–1	Ballymena United
Magee 31'; Hawkins 40' (pen.)		Dougherty 6'

The Oval, Belfast
Referee: W. Clarke (Newtownards)
