= 1928–29 County Antrim Shield =

Tournament details
- Country: Northern Ireland
- Teams: 12

Final positions
- Champions: Linfield (12th win)
- Runners-up: Broadway United

Tournament statistics
- Matches played: 11
- Goals scored: 57 (5.18 per match)

The 1928–29 County Antrim Shield was the 40th edition of the County Antrim Shield, a cup competition in Northern Irish football.

Linfield won the tournament for the 12th time and 2nd consecutive year, defeating Broadway United 2–1 in the final at Grosvenor Park.

== Results ==
=== First round ===
Team 1	Score	Team 2
Cliftonville	4–0	Larne
Crusaders	4–2	Belfast Celtic
Glentoran	4–3	Bangor
Linfield	2–0	Ards
Ballymena	bye	
Broadway United	bye	
Distillery	bye	
Queen's Island	bye	

=== Quarter-finals ===
Team 1	Score	Team 2
Ballymena	1–2	Linfield
Cliftonville	1–2	Distillery
Crusaders	0–3	Broadway United
Glentoran	6–3	Queen's Island

=== Semi-finals ===
Team 1	Score	Team 2
Broadway United	3–0	Glentoran
Linfield	11–3	Distillery

=== Final ===
10 April 1929

Linfield	2–1	Broadway United
Bambrick 62'; Meharg 80'	Report	Fulton 43'

Grosvenor Park, Belfast
Referee: T. Hull (Barnsley)
