= 1892–93 County Antrim Shield =

Tournament details
- Country: Ireland
- Date: 26 November 1892 – 18 March 1893
- Teams: 7

Final positions
- Champions: Distillery (2nd win)
- Runners-up: Celtic

Tournament statistics
- Matches played: 5
- Goals scored: 20 (4 per match)

The 1892–93 County Antrim Shield was the 5th edition of the County Antrim Shield, a cup competition in Irish football.

Distillery won the tournament for the 2nd time, defeating Celtic 2–1 in the final.

== Results ==
=== Quarter-finals ===
Team 1	Score	Team 2
Barn	0–2	Distillery
Cliftonville Olympic	0–2	Celtic
Ligoniel Rangers	6–1	Ballyclare
Cliftonville	bye	

=== Semi-finals ===
Team 1	Score	Team 2
Celtic	4–2	Cliftonville
Distillery	w/o	Ligoniel Rangers

=== Final ===
18 March 1893

Distillery	2–1	Celtic
Crothers; Burnett	Report	McGarry

Grosvenor Park, Belfast
