= 1896–97 County Antrim Shield =

Tournament details
- Country: Ireland
- Date: 16 January 1897 – 12 April 1897
- Teams: 8

Final positions
- Champions: Distillery (4th win)
- Runners-up: Linfield

Tournament statistics
- Matches played: 10
- Goals scored: 44 (4.4 per match)

The 1896–97 County Antrim Shield was the 9th edition of the County Antrim Shield, a cup competition in Irish football.

Distillery won the tournament for the 4th time and 2nd consecutive year, defeating Linfield 3–1 in the final replay, after the original final ended in a 2–2 draw.

== Results ==
=== Quarter-finals ===
Team 1	Score	Team 2
Cliftonville	1–2	Glentoran
Distillery	4–1	North Staffordshire Regiment
Linfield	6–1	Wesley
Milltown	1–6	Celtic

=== Semi-finals ===
Team 1	Score	Team 2
Distillery	2–1^{1}	Celtic
Linfield	2–0	Glentoran

- ^{1} The match was ordered to be replayed after a protest.

==== Replay ====
Team 1	Score	Team 2
Distillery	2–1^{1}	Celtic

- ^{1} The match was abandoned after 75 minutes and was ordered to be replayed.

==== Second replay ====
Team 1	Score	Team 2
Distillery	4–1	Celtic

=== Final ===
3 April 1897

Distillery	2–2	Linfield
Baird; Stanfield	Report	R. Torrans; Scott

Solitude, Belfast
Attendance: 5,000

==== Replay ====
12 April 1897

Distillery	3–1	Linfield
Hall; Baird; Mercer	Report	Gaffikin

Solitude, Belfast
Attendance: 1,500
