= 1951–52 County Antrim Shield =

Tournament details
- Country: Northern Ireland
- Teams: 10

Final positions
- Champions: Glentoran (13th win)
- Runners-up: Brantwood

Tournament statistics
- Matches played: 12
- Goals scored: 31 (2.58 per match)

The 1951–52 County Antrim Shield was the 63rd edition of the County Antrim Shield, a cup competition in Northern Irish football.

Glentoran won the tournament for the 13th time, defeating Brantwood 3–0 in the final at Solitude.

== Results ==
=== First round ===
Team 1	Score	Team 2
Ballymena United	1–1	Feltville United
Cliftonville	2–2	Brantwood
Ards	bye	
Ballymena United	bye	
Cliftonville	bye	
Crusaders	bye	
Distillery	bye	
Linfield	bye	

==== Replays ====
Team 1	Score	Team 2
Ballymena United	5–0	Feltville United
Brantwood	1–0	Cliftonville

=== Quarter-finals ===
Team 1	Score	Team 2
Ballymena United	1–1	Glentoran
Crusaders	2–0	Bangor
Distillery	2–0	Ards
Linfield	1–3	Brantwood

==== Replay ====
Team 1	Score	Team 2
Glentoran	3–0	Ballymena United

=== Semi-finals ===
Team 1	Score	Team 2
Brantwood	1–0	Crusaders
Glentoran	2–0	Distillery

=== Final ===
10 May 1952

Glentoran	3–0	Brantwood
O'Kane 59'; Hughes 66', 86'	Report

Solitude, Belfast
