= 1935–36 County Antrim Shield =

Tournament details
- Country: Northern Ireland
- Teams: 11

Final positions
- Champions: Belfast Celtic (4th win)
- Runners-up: Belfast Celtic II

Tournament statistics
- Matches played: 10
- Goals scored: 39 (3.9 per match)

The 1935–36 County Antrim Shield was the 47th edition of the County Antrim Shield, a cup competition in Northern Irish football.

Belfast Celtic won the tournament for the 4th time, defeating Belfast Celtic II (Belfast Celtic's reserve team) 1–0 in the final at Windsor Park.

== Results ==
=== First round ===
| Team 1 | Score | Team 2 |
|---|---|---|
| Distillery | 3–0 | Ards |
| Larne | 5–2 | Bangor |
| Linfield | 4–0 | Glentoran II |
| Ballymena United | bye | |
| Belfast Celtic | bye | |
| Belfast Celtic II | bye | |
| Cliftonville | bye | |
| Glentoran | bye | |

=== Quarter-finals ===
| Team 1 | Score | Team 2 |
|---|---|---|
| Belfast Celtic II | 2–1 | Glentoran |
| Cliftonville | 2–3 | Larne |
| Distillery | 4–1 | Ballymena United |
| Linfield | 0–2 | Belfast Celtic |

=== Semi-finals ===
| Team 1 | Score | Team 2 |
|---|---|---|
| Belfast Celtic | 3–1 | Larne |
| Belfast Celtic II | 3–2 | Distillery |

=== Final ===
29 April 1936

| Belfast Celtic | 1–0 | Belfast Celtic II |
|---|---|---|
| Donaghy 40' | Report |

Windsor Park, Belfast
Referee: W. McLean
