= 1917–18 County Antrim Shield =

Tournament details
- Country: Ireland
- Date: 12 January 1918 – 20 April 1918
- Teams: 6

Final positions
- Champions: Glentoran (5th win)
- Runners-up: Linfield

Tournament statistics
- Matches played: 7
- Goals scored: 14 (2 per match)

The 1917–18 County Antrim Shield was the 29th edition of the County Antrim Shield, a cup competition in Irish football.

Glentoran won the tournament for the 8th time, defeating Linfield 2–0 in the final at Grosvenor Park.

== Results ==
=== Quarter-finals ===
Team 1	Score	Team 2
Belfast United	0–0	Belfast Celtic
Distillery	1–2	Linfield
Cliftonville	bye	
Glentoran	bye	

==== Replay ====
Team 1	Score	Team 2
Belfast Celtic	0–0	Belfast United

==== Second replay ====
Team 1	Score	Team 2
Belfast Celtic	1–0	Belfast United

=== Semi-finals ===
Team 1	Score	Team 2
Glentoran	2–1	Belfast Celtic
Linfield	4–1	Cliftonville

=== Final ===
20 April 1918

Glentoran	2–0	Linfield
Connor; Crone	Report

Grosvenor Park, Belfast
Referee: Mr M. Bleakley
