= 1904–05 County Antrim Shield =

Tournament details
- Country: Ireland
- Date: 21 January 1905 – 15 April 1905
- Teams: 6

Final positions
- Champions: Distillery (7th win)
- Runners-up: Linfield

Tournament statistics
- Matches played: 5
- Goals scored: 12 (2.4 per match)

The 1904–05 County Antrim Shield was the 17th edition of the County Antrim Shield, a cup competition in Irish football.

Distillery won the tournament for the 7th time, defeating Linfield 2–0 in the final at Solitude.

== Results ==
=== Quarter-finals ===
Team 1	Score	Team 2
Belfast Celtic	1–2	Linfield
Cliftonville	0–2	Glentoran II
Distillery	bye	
Glentoran	bye	

=== Semi-finals ===
Team 1	Score	Team 2
Distillery	2–1	Glentoran
Linfield	2–0	Glentoran II

=== Final ===
15 April 1905

Distillery	2–0	Linfield
Murray; Soye	Report

Solitude, Belfast
Attendance: 4,000
Referee: Tom Robertson
