= 1945–46 County Antrim Shield =

Tournament details
- Country: Northern Ireland
- Teams: 8

Final positions
- Champions: Distillery (11th win)
- Runners-up: Bangor Reserves

Tournament statistics
- Matches played: 9
- Goals scored: 33 (3.67 per match)

The 1945–46 County Antrim Shield was the 57th edition of the County Antrim Shield, a cup competition in Northern Irish football.

Distillery won the tournament for the 11th time, defeating Bangor Reserves 3–0 in the final replay at Windsor Park.

== Results ==
=== Quarter-finals ===
Team 1	Score	Team 2
Belfast Celtic	2–0	Linfield
Cliftonville	1–1	Bangor Reserves
Distillery	5–0	Glentoran
Dundela	5–1	Ards

==== Replays ====
Team 1	Score	Team 2
Bangor Reserves	5–0	Cliftonville

=== Semi-finals ===
Team 1	Score	Team 2
Bangor Reserves	5–2	Dundela
Distillery	1–0	Belfast Celtic

=== Final ===
8 May 1946

Distillery	1–1	Bangor Reserves
Walker 82'	Report	Bradford 35'

Windsor Park, Belfast

==== Replay ====
13 May 1946

Distillery	3–0	Bangor Reserves
R. McIlvenny; Walker	Report

Windsor Park, Belfast
