= 1901–02 County Antrim Shield =

Tournament details
- Country: Ireland
- Date: 18 January 1902 – 29 March 1902
- Teams: 8

Final positions
- Champions: Glentoran (2nd win)
- Runners-up: Distillery

Tournament statistics
- Matches played: 8
- Goals scored: 27 (3.38 per match)

The 1901–02 County Antrim Shield was the 14th edition of the County Antrim Shield, a cup competition in Irish football.

Glentoran won the tournament for the 2nd time and 2nd consecutive year, defeating Distillery 2–1 in the final at the Solitude stadium.

== Results ==
=== Quarter-finals ===
Team 1	Score	Team 2
Belfast Celtic	0–2	Glentoran
Cliftonville	2–1	Linfield
Cliftonville Olympic	2–4	Distillery West End
Distillery	2–1	Ulster

=== Semi-finals ===
Team 1	Score	Team 2
Distillery	1–1	Cliftonville
Glentoran	6–1	Distillery West End

==== Replay ====
Team 1	Score	Team 2
Distillery	1–0	Cliftonville

=== Final ===
29 March 1902

Glentoran	2–1	Distillery
Johnston; McKelvey	Report	Cairns

Solitude, Belfast
