= 1979–80 County Antrim Shield =

Tournament details
- Country: Northern Ireland
- Teams: 13

Final positions
- Champions: Ballymena United (4th win)
- Runners-up: Crusaders

Tournament statistics
- Matches played: 12
- Goals scored: 35 (2.92 per match)

The 1979–80 County Antrim Shield was the 91st edition of the County Antrim Shield, a cup competition in Northern Irish football.

Ballymena United won the tournament for the 4th time, defeating Crusaders 3–1 on penalties after the final finished 0-0.

== Results ==
=== First round ===
Team 1	Score	Team 2
Ards	2–4	Linfield Swifts
Bangor	3–3 (3–4 p)	Barn United
Cliftonville	1–2	Glentoran
Distillery	1–0	Shorts
Glentoran II	0–1	Ballymena United
Crusaders	bye	
Larne	bye	
Linfield	bye	

=== Quarter-finals ===
Team 1	Score	Team 2
Ballymena United	4–2 (a.e.t.)	Barn United
Distillery	0–1	Larne
Linfield	0–3	Crusaders
Linfield Swifts	2–0	Glentoran

=== Semi-finals ===
Team 1	Score	Team 2
Ballymena United	3–0	Larne
Linfield Swifts	1–2	Crusaders

=== Final ===
13 May 1980

Ballymena United	0–0 (a.e.t.)	Crusaders
	Report
Penalties
McCullough (penalty scored); Mullan (penalty scored); Fox (penalty missed); McQuiston (penalty scored)	3–1	(penalty scored) Byrne; (penalty missed) Gillespie; (penalty missed) Mulhall; (penalty missed) McPolin

The Oval, Belfast
Referee: A. Snoddy (Lisburn)
