= 1922–23 County Antrim Shield =

Tournament details
- Country: Northern Ireland
- Date: 13 January 1923 – 10 March 1923
- Teams: 7

Final positions
- Champions: Linfield (10th win)
- Runners-up: Glentoran

Tournament statistics
- Matches played: 10
- Goals scored: 23 (2.3 per match)

The 1922–23 County Antrim Shield was the 34th edition of the County Antrim Shield, a cup competition in Northern Irish football.

Linfield won the tournament for the 10th time and 2nd consecutive year, defeating Glentoran 4–1 in the final at Solitude.

== Results ==
=== Quarter-finals ===
Team 1	Score	Team 2
Cliftonville	1–0	Crusaders
Linfield	1–0	Bangor
Queen's Island	6–2	Distillery
Glentoran	bye	

=== Semi-finals ===
Team 1	Score	Team 2
Glentoran	1–1	Cliftonville
Linfield	0–0	Queen's Island

==== Replays ====
Team 1	Score	Team 2
Glentoran	2–1	Cliftonville
Linfield	0–0	Queen's Island

==== Second replay ====
Team 1	Score	Team 2
Linfield	1–1	Queen's Island

==== Third replay ====
Team 1	Score	Team 2
Linfield	1–0	Queen's Island

=== Final ===
10 March 1923

Linfield	4–1	Glentoran
Savage; McCracken; Cowan	Report	Keenan

Solitude, Belfast
Referee: Mr S. Thompson
