= 1906–07 County Antrim Shield =

Tournament details
- Country: Ireland
- Date: 26 January 1907 – 30 March 1907
- Teams: 6

Final positions
- Champions: Linfield (4th win)
- Runners-up: Glentoran

Tournament statistics
- Matches played: 7
- Goals scored: 27 (3.86 per match)

The 1906–07 County Antrim Shield was the 19th edition of the County Antrim Shield, a cup competition in Irish football.

Linfield won the tournament for the 4th time, defeating Glentoran 2–0 in the final at Solitude.

== Results ==
=== Quarter-finals ===
Team 1	Score	Team 2
Cliftonville	1–2	Linfield
Glentoran	10–0	Cliftonville Olympic
Belfast Celtic	bye	
Distillery	bye	

=== Semi-finals ===
Team 1	Score	Team 2
Belfast Celtic	1–3	Linfield
Distillery	0–0	Glentoran

==== Replay ====
Team 1	Score	Team 2
Distillery	3–3	Glentoran

==== Second replay ====
Team 1	Score	Team 2
Distillery	2–0	Glentoran

=== Final ===
30 March 1907

Linfield	2–0	Glentoran
Young; Darling	Report

Solitude, Belfast
Referee: Mr Broughton
