= 1919–20 County Antrim Shield =

Tournament details
- Country: Ireland
- Date: 10 January 1920 – 3 March 1920
- Teams: 7

Final positions
- Champions: Distillery (10th win)
- Runners-up: Belfast Celtic

Tournament statistics
- Matches played: 7
- Goals scored: 12 (1.71 per match)

The 1919–20 County Antrim Shield was the 31st edition of the County Antrim Shield, a cup competition in Irish football.

Distillery won the tournament for the 10th time and 2nd consecutive year, defeating Belfast Celtic 2–0 in the final replay at Solitude, after the original final at Windsor Park finished 0–0.

== Results ==
=== Quarter-finals ===
Team 1	Score	Team 2
Belfast Celtic	1–0	Belfast United
Distillery	2–1	Cliftonville
Linfield	3–1	Dunmurry
Glentoran	bye	

=== Semi-finals ===
Team 1	Score	Team 2
Belfast Celtic	1–0	Linfield
Distillery	1–0	Cliftonville

=== Final ===
28 February 1920

Distillery	0–0	Belfast Celtic
	Report

Windsor Park, Belfast
Referee: Mr T. Keenan

==== Replay ====
3 March 1920

Distillery	2–0	Belfast Celtic
J. Reid	Report

Solitude, Belfast
Referee: T. Keenan
