= 1936–37 County Antrim Shield =

Tournament details
- Country: Northern Ireland
- Teams: 11

Final positions
- Champions: Belfast Celtic (5th win)
- Runners-up: Glentoran

Tournament statistics
- Matches played: 11
- Goals scored: 54 (4.91 per match)

The 1936–37 County Antrim Shield was the 48th edition of the County Antrim Shield, a cup competition in Northern Irish football.

Belfast Celtic won the tournament for the 5th time and 2nd consecutive season, defeating Glentoran 1–0 in the final replay at Grosvenor Park after the original final ended in a 2–2 draw.

== Results ==
=== First round ===
Team 1	Score	Team 2
Belfast Celtic	10–0	Crusaders
Glentoran	6–2	Glentoran II
Larne	3–1	Bangor
Ards	bye	
Ballymena United	bye	
Cliftonville	bye	
Distillery	bye	
Linfield	bye	

=== Quarter-finals ===
Team 1	Score	Team 2
Belfast Celtic	4–2	Linfield
Distillery	4–0	Ards
Glentoran	5–1	Ballymena United
Larne	4–0	Cliftonville

=== Semi-finals ===
Team 1	Score	Team 2
Belfast Celtic	2–0	Distillery
Glentoran	4–1	Larne

=== Final ===
21 April 1937

Belfast Celtic	2–2	Glentoran
Turnbull 39'; McIlroy 89'	Report	Miller 8' (pen.), 59'

Grosvenor Park, Belfast

==== Replay ====
30 April 1937

Belfast Celtic	1–0	Glentoran
Turnbull	Report

Grosvenor Park, Belfast
