= 1973–74 County Antrim Shield =

Tournament details
- Country: Northern Ireland
- Teams: 13

Final positions
- Champions: Crusaders (4th win)
- Runners-up: Larne

Tournament statistics
- Matches played: 11
- Goals scored: 32 (2.91 per match)

The 1973–74 County Antrim Shield was the 85th edition of the County Antrim Shield, a cup competition in Northern Irish football.

Crusaders won the tournament for the 4th time, defeating Larne 2–1 in the final.

== Results ==
=== First round ===
Team 1	Score	Team 2
Ards	w/o	Glentoran II
Crusaders	5–0	Ballymena United
Distillery	0–1	Lisburn Rangers
Glentoran	0–1	Bangor Reserves
Larne	1–0	Chimney Corner
Bangor	bye	
Cliftonville	bye	
Linfield	bye	

=== Quarter-finals ===
Team 1	Score	Team 2
Bangor	4–1	Lisburn Rangers
Bangor Reserves	1–3	Ards
Crusaders	3–0	Cliftonville
Larne	4–0	Linfield

=== Semi-finals ===
Team 1	Score	Team 2
Bangor	0–2	Crusaders
Larne	2–1	Ards

=== Final ===
20 May 1974

Larne	1–2	Crusaders
Rainey 27'	Report	Flanagan 65'; McQuillan 67'

Inver Park, Larne
Attendance: 5,000
Referee: S. Patterson
