= 1898–99 County Antrim Shield =

Tournament details
- Country: Ireland
- Date: 7 January 1899 – 2 May 1899
- Teams: 8

Final positions
- Champions: Linfield (1st win)
- Runners-up: Linfield Swifts

Tournament statistics
- Matches played: 16
- Goals scored: 53 (3.31 per match)

The 1898–99 County Antrim Shield was the 11th edition of the County Antrim Shield, a cup competition in Irish football.

Linfield won the tournament for the 1st time, defeating Linfield Swifts (Linfield's reserve team) 4–0 in the final replay after the original final ended in a 1–1 draw.

== Results ==
=== Quarter-finals ===
Team 1	Score	Team 2
Cliftonville	2–2	North Staffordshire Regiment
Distillery	2–2	Celtic
Glentoran	0–3	Linfield
Linfield Swifts	5–0	Celtic II

==== Replays ====
Team 1	Score	Team 2
Celtic	1–1	Distillery
North Staffordshire Regiment	4–4	Cliftonville

==== Second replays ====
Team 1	Score	Team 2
Cliftonville	3–1	North Staffordshire Regiment
Distillery	3–1^{1}	Celtic

- ^{1}The match was ordered to be replayed after a protest.

==== Third replay ====
Team 1	Score	Team 2
Distillery	1–0	Celtic

=== Semi-finals ===
Team 1	Score	Team 2
Linfield	1–1	Distillery
Linfield Swifts	2–1	Cliftonville

==== Replay ====
Team 1	Score	Team 2
Linfield	2–1^{1}	Distillery

- ^{1}The match was ordered to be replayed after a protest.

==== Second replay ====
Team 1	Score	Team 2
Distillery	2–1^{1}	Linfield

- ^{1}The match was ordered to be replayed after a protest.

==== Third replay ====
Team 1	Score	Team 2
Linfield	1–0	Distillery

=== Final ===
24 April 1899

Linfield	1–1	Linfield Swifts
McAllen	Report	Dougan

Solitude, Belfast
Attendance: 2,000

==== Replay ====
2 May 1899
18:30 GMT

Linfield	4–0	Linfield Swifts
Jordan; McAllen; Darling	Report

Solitude, Belfast
Attendance: 1,500
Referee: Jim Torrans
