= 1921–22 County Antrim Shield =

Tournament details
- Country: Northern Ireland
- Date: 7 January 1922 – 1 March 1922
- Teams: 7

Final positions
- Champions: Linfield (9th win)
- Runners-up: Distillery

Tournament statistics
- Matches played: 10
- Goals scored: 34 (3.4 per match)

The 1921–22 County Antrim Shield was the 33rd edition of the County Antrim Shield, a cup competition in Northern Irish football.

Linfield won the tournament for the 9th time, defeating Distillery 4–1 in the final replay at Solitude, after the original final at The Oval ended in a 1–1 draw.

== Results ==
=== Quarter-finals ===
Team 1	Score	Team 2
Cliftonville	2–2	Distillery
Glentoran	3–3	Dundela
Queen's Island	1–0	Cliftonville Olympic
Linfield	bye	

==== Replays ====
Team 1	Score	Team 2
Distillery	1–2	Cliftonville
Dundela	0–3	Glentoran

=== Semi-finals ===
Team 1	Score	Team 2
Distillery	5–4	Glentoran
Linfield	1–1	Queen's Island

==== Replay ====
Team 1	Score	Team 2
Linfield	1–0	Queen's Island

=== Final ===
18 February 1922

Linfield	1–1	Distillery
McIlreavy 81'	Report	McKenzie 75'

The Oval, Belfast
Referee: Mr Thompson

==== Replay ====
1 March 1922

Linfield	4–1	Distillery
Scott; Savage; McIlreavy	Report	Dalrymple

Solitude, Belfast
