= 1920–21 County Antrim Shield =

Tournament details
- Country: Ireland
- Date: 18 January 1921 – 13 April 1921
- Teams: 6

Final positions
- Champions: Glentoran (6th win)
- Runners-up: Distillery

Tournament statistics
- Matches played: 11
- Goals scored: 16 (1.45 per match)

The 1920–21 County Antrim Shield was the 32nd edition of the County Antrim Shield, a cup competition in Irish football.

Glentoran won the tournament for the 6th time, defeating Distillery 1–0 in the third final replay at Windsor Park, after the original final and two subsequent replays finished in draws.

== Results ==
=== Quarter-finals ===
Team 1	Score	Team 2
Cliftonville	2–0	Brantwood
Glentoran	2–0	Bangor
Distillery	bye	
Linfield	bye	

=== Semi-finals ===
Team 1	Score	Team 2
Distillery	1–1	Cliftonville
Glentoran	1–1	Linfield

==== Replays ====
Team 1	Score	Team 2
Distillery	1–1	Cliftonville
Glentoran	1–0	Linfield

==== Second replay ====
Team 1	Score	Team 2
Distillery	2–0	Cliftonville

=== Final ===
19 February 1921

Glentoran	1–1	Distillery
Lyner 1'	Report	Chambers 3'

Solitude, Belfast
Referee: Mr McLean

==== Replay ====
9 March 1921

Glentoran	0–0	Distillery
	Report

Windsor Park, Belfast

==== Second replay ====
16 March 1921

Glentoran	0–0	Distillery
	Report

Solitude, Belfast

==== Third replay ====
13 April 1921

Glentoran	1–0	Distillery
Emerson 10' (pen.)	Report

Windsor Park, Belfast
