= 1910–11 County Antrim Shield =

Tournament details
- Country: Ireland
- Date: 18 February 1911 – 18 April 1911
- Teams: 6

Final positions
- Champions: Glentoran (3rd win)
- Runners-up: Cliftonville

Tournament statistics
- Matches played: 5
- Goals scored: 9 (1.8 per match)

The 1910–11 County Antrim Shield was the 23rd edition of the County Antrim Shield, a cup competition in Irish football.

Glentoran won the tournament for the 2nd time, defeating Cliftonville 2–0 in the final at Celtic Park.

== Results ==
=== Quarter-finals ===
Team 1	Score	Team 2
Cliftonville	1–0	Glentoran II
Linfield	1–3	Glentoran
Belfast Celtic	bye	
Distillery	bye	

=== Semi-finals ===
Team 1	Score	Team 2
Cliftonville	1–0	Distillery
Glentoran	1–0	Belfast Celtic

=== Final ===
8 April 1911

Glentoran	2–0	Cliftonville
Hunter	Report

Celtic Park, Belfast
Attendance: 6,000
Referee: Mr Tipping (Stockport)
