= 1944–45 County Antrim Shield =

Tournament details
- Country: Northern Ireland
- Teams: 8

Final positions
- Champions: Belfast Celtic (8th win)
- Runners-up: Linfield

Tournament statistics
- Matches played: 10
- Goals scored: 31 (3.1 per match)

The 1944–45 County Antrim Shield was the 56th edition of the County Antrim Shield, a cup competition in Northern Irish football.

Belfast Celtic won the tournament for the 8th time, defeating Linfield 1–0 in the final replay at Solitude.

== Results ==
=== Quarter-finals ===
| Team 1 | Score | Team 2 |
|---|---|---|
| Bangor | 0–0 | Ards |
| Belfast Celtic | 3–1 | Glentoran |
| Distillery | 1–1 | Linfield |
| Larne | 4–1 | Cliftonville |

==== Replays ====
| Team 1 | Score | Team 2 |
|---|---|---|
| Ards | 2–1 | Bangor |
| Linfield | 8–1 | Distillery |

=== Semi-finals ===
| Team 1 | Score | Team 2 |
|---|---|---|
| Belfast Celtic | 1–0 | Ards |
| Linfield | 4–2 | Larne |

=== Final ===
1 May 1945

| Belfast Celtic | 0–0 | Linfield |
|---|---|---|
| | Report |

Grosvenor Park, Belfast

==== Replay ====
28 May 1945

| Belfast Celtic | 1–0 | Linfield |
|---|---|---|
| McAlinden 25' | Report |

Solitude, Belfast
