= 1957–58 County Antrim Shield =

Tournament details
- Country: Northern Ireland
- Teams: 10

Final positions
- Champions: Linfield (23rd win)
- Runners-up: Distillery

Tournament statistics
- Matches played: 10
- Goals scored: 25 (2.5 per match)

The 1957–58 County Antrim Shield was the 69th edition of the County Antrim Shield, a cup competition in Northern Irish football.

Linfield won the tournament for the 23rd time, defeating Distillery 3–1 in the final at Solitude.

== Results ==
=== First round ===
Team 1	Score	Team 2
Glentoran	3–0	Larne
Glentoran II	0–3	Distillery
Ards	bye	
Ballymena United	bye	
Bangor	bye	
Distillery	bye	
Glentoran	bye	
Linfield	bye	

=== Quarter-finals ===
Team 1	Score	Team 2
Bangor	0–0	Ballymena United
Cliftonville	0–2	Glentoran
Crusaders	1–2	Distillery
Linfield	3–0	Ards

==== Replay ====
Team 1	Score	Team 2
Ballymena United	1–0	Bangor

=== Semi-finals ===
Team 1	Score	Team 2
Distillery	3–1	Ballymena United
Linfield	2–0	Glentoran

=== Final ===
10 May 1958

Linfield	3–1	Distillery
Irvine 63', 69'; Parke 89'	Report	Lunn 75' (pen.)

Solitude, Belfast
