= 1903–04 County Antrim Shield =

Tournament details
- Country: Ireland
- Date: 23 January 1904 – 2 April 1904
- Teams: 8

Final positions
- Champions: Linfield (2nd win)
- Runners-up: Belfast Celtic

Tournament statistics
- Matches played: 10
- Goals scored: 29 (2.9 per match)

The 1903–04 County Antrim Shield was the 16th edition of the County Antrim Shield, a cup competition in Irish football.

Linfield won the tournament for the 2nd time, defeating Belfast Celtic 4–1 in the final at Solitude.

== Results ==
=== Quarter-finals ===
Team 1	Score	Team 2
Cliftonville	6–1	King's Own Scottish Borderers
Glentoran	0–0	Belfast Celtic
Linfield	0–0	Distillery
YMCA	2–1	Linfield Swifts

=== Replays ===
Team 1	Score	Team 2
Belfast Celtic	2–2^{1}	Glentoran
Distillery	0–1	Linfield

^{1}Belfast Celtic were awarded victory after a protest

=== Semi-finals ===
Team 1	Score	Team 2
Belfast Celtic	3–3	YMCA
Linfield	0–0^{1}	Cliftonville

^{1}Linfield were awarded victory after a protest

==== Replay ====
Team 1	Score	Team 2
Belfast Celtic	3–0	YMCA

=== Final ===
2 April 1904

Linfield	4–1	Belfast Celtic
Maginnis; Milne; Hagan; Carnegie	Report	Synott (pen.)

Solitude, Belfast
