= 1972–73 County Antrim Shield =

Tournament details
- Country: Northern Ireland
- Teams: 13

Final positions
- Champions: Linfield (30th win)
- Runners-up: Bangor

Tournament statistics
- Matches played: 15
- Goals scored: 54 (3.6 per match)

The 1972–73 County Antrim Shield was the 84th edition of the County Antrim Shield, a cup competition in Northern Irish football.

Linfield won the tournament for the 30th time, defeating Bangor 9–1 on aggregate in the final.

== Results ==
=== First round ===
Team 1	Score	Team 2
Bangor	5–2	Chimney Corner
Carrick Rangers	0–2	Linfield
Crusaders	0–1	Dundela
Glentoran	3–1	Distillery
Linfield Swifts	0–1	Ards
Ballymena United	bye	
Cliftonville	bye	
Larne	bye	

=== Quarter-finals ===
Team 1	Score	Team 2
Ards	0–1	Linfield
Bangor	3–2	Larne
Cliftonville	2–1	Dundela
Glentoran	5–5 (5–3 p)	Ballymena United

=== Semi-finals ===
Teams that were at home in the first leg listed on the left.

Team 1	Agg.	Team 2	1st leg	2nd leg
Bangor	3–0	Cliftonville	1–0	2–0
Linfield	4–3	Glentoran	1–1	3–2

=== Final ===
17 May 1973

Linfield	4–1	Bangor
Malone 27'; McAllister 57'; Cochrane 83'; Shields 84'	Report	Morrison 65'

Windsor Park, Belfast
Attendance: 1,000
Referee: V. Maxwell (Belfast)
28 May 1973

Bangor	0–5	Linfield
	Report	McAllister 2'; Millen 31'; Malone; Magee (pen.)

Referee: T. Perry (Newtownabbey)
