= 1947–48 County Antrim Shield =

Tournament details
- Country: Northern Ireland
- Teams: 10

Final positions
- Champions: Ballymena United (1st win)
- Runners-up: Linfield

Tournament statistics
- Matches played: 12
- Goals scored: 51 (4.25 per match)

The 1947–48 County Antrim Shield was the 59th edition of the County Antrim Shield, a cup competition in Northern Irish football.

Ballymena United won the tournament for the 1st time, defeating Linfield 2–1 in the final at Celtic Park. This was the first time the tournament was won by a team from outside Belfast.

== Results ==
=== First round ===
Team 1	Score	Team 2
Belfast Celtic	3–2	Crusaders
Larne	1–4	Distillery
Ards	bye	
Ballymena United	bye	
Bangor	bye	
Cliftonville	bye	
Glentoran	bye	
Linfield	bye	

=== Quarter-finals ===
Team 1	Score	Team 2
Ards	3–1	Cliftonville
Bangor	2–3	Ballymena United
Belfast Celtic	4–0	Distillery
Glentoran	1–1	Linfield

==== Replay ====
Team 1	Score	Team 2
Linfield	2–0	Glentoran

=== Semi-finals ===
Team 1	Score	Team 2
Ballymena United	4–1	Ards
Linfield	3–3	Belfast Celtic

==== Replay ====
Team 1	Score	Team 2
Linfield	2–2	Belfast Celtic

==== Second replay ====
Team 1	Score	Team 2
Linfield	5–1	Belfast Celtic

=== Final ===
18 May 1948

Ballymena United	2–1	Linfield
McDonald 22', 87'	Report	Simpson 78'

Celtic Park, Belfast
