= 1914–15 County Antrim Shield =

Tournament details
- Country: Ireland
- Date: 9 January 1915 – 20 March 1915
- Teams: 6

Final positions
- Champions: Distillery (8th win)
- Runners-up: Glentoran

Tournament statistics
- Matches played: 5
- Goals scored: 14 (2.8 per match)

The 1914–15 County Antrim Shield was the 26th edition of the County Antrim Shield, a cup competition in Irish football.

Distillery won the tournament for the 8th time, defeating Glentoran 1–0 in the final at Windsor Park.

== Results ==
=== Quarter-finals ===
Team 1	Score	Team 2
Distillery	4–1	Glentoran II
Glentoran	2–1	Linfield
Belfast Celtic	bye	
Cliftonville	bye	

=== Semi-finals ===
Team 1	Score	Team 2
Distillery	4–0	Cliftonville
Glentoran	1–0	Belfast Celtic

=== Final ===
20 March 1915

Distillery	1–0	Glentoran
Milne	Report

Windsor Park, Belfast
Attendance: 6,000
Referee: Mr McKenzie (Glasgow)
