= 1981–82 County Antrim Shield =

Tournament details
- Country: Northern Ireland
- Teams: 13

Final positions
- Champions: Linfield (33rd win)
- Runners-up: Distillery

Tournament statistics
- Matches played: 12
- Goals scored: 31 (2.58 per match)

The 1981–82 County Antrim Shield was the 93rd edition of the County Antrim Shield, a cup competition in Northern Irish football.

Linfield won the tournament for the 33rd time and 2nd season in a row, defeating Distillery 1–0 in the final.

== Results ==
=== First round ===
Team 1	Score	Team 2
Ards	2–0	Killyleagh Youth
Ballyclare Comrades	1–2	Ballymena United
Cliftonville	6–0	Harland & Wolff Welders
Crusaders	0–1	RUC
Linfield	1–0	Glentoran
Bangor	bye	
Distillery	bye	
Larne	bye	

=== Quarter-finals ===
Team 1	Score	Team 2
Ards	1–5	Cliftonville
Ballymena United	2–0	Bangor
Distillery	1–0	RUC
Larne	0–1	Linfield

=== Semi-finals ===
Team 1	Score	Team 2
Distillery	2–1	Ballymena United
Linfield	4–0	Glentoran

=== Final ===
4 May 1982

Linfield	1–0	Distillery
McKee 71'	Report

Seaview, Belfast
Referee: A. Ritchie (Carrickfergus)
