= 1950–51 County Antrim Shield =

Tournament details
- Country: Northern Ireland
- Teams: 10

Final positions
- Champions: Ballymena United (2nd win)
- Runners-up: Cliftonville

Tournament statistics
- Matches played: 11
- Goals scored: 46 (4.18 per match)

The 1950–51 County Antrim Shield was the 62nd edition of the County Antrim Shield, a cup competition in Northern Irish football.

Ballymena United won the tournament for the 2nd time, defeating Cliftonville 3–0 in the final replay at Windsor Park, after the original final ended in a 2–2 draw.

== Results ==
=== First round ===
Team 1	Score	Team 2
Ballymoney United	0–1	Glentoran
Bangor	3–4	Brantwood
Ards	bye	
Ballymena United	bye	
Cliftonville	bye	
Crusaders	bye	
Distillery	bye	
Linfield	bye	

=== Quarter-finals ===
Team 1	Score	Team 2
Cliftonville	4–0	Distillery
Crusaders	1–3	Brantwood
Glentoran	2–1	Ards
Linfield	1–4	Ballymena United

=== Semi-finals ===
Team 1	Score	Team 2
Ballymena United	2–1	Brantwood
Cliftonville	3–3	Glentoran

==== Replay ====
Team 1	Score	Team 2
Cliftonville	4–2	Glentoran

=== Final ===
16 May 1951

Ballymena United	2–2	Cliftonville
Douglas 40'; Currie 55'	Report	McGarry 67'; Reid 82'

Windsor Park, Belfast

==== Replay ====
20 August 1951

Ballymena United	3–0	Cliftonville
Cubitt 9'; Currie 10', 59'	Report

Windsor Park, Belfast
