= 1905–06 County Antrim Shield =

Tournament details
- Country: Ireland
- Date: 20 January 1906 – 14 April 1906
- Teams: 6

Final positions
- Champions: Linfield (3rd win)
- Runners-up: Distillery

Tournament statistics
- Matches played: 10
- Goals scored: 28 (2.8 per match)

The 1905–06 County Antrim Shield was the 18th edition of the County Antrim Shield, a cup competition in Irish football.

Linfield won the tournament for the 3rd time, defeating Distillery 2–0 in the final replay at Windsor Park after the original final at Solitude finished in a 1–1 draw.

== Results ==
=== Quarter-finals ===
Team 1	Score	Team 2
Distillery	1–1	Mountpottinger
Glentoran	0–2	Cliftonville
Belfast Celtic	bye	
Linfield	bye	

==== Replay ====
Team 1	Score	Team 2
Distillery	3–1	Mountpottinger

=== Semi-finals ===
Team 1	Score	Team 2
Distillery	2–2	Belfast Celtic
Linfield	4–1	Cliftonville

==== Replay ====
Team 1	Score	Team 2
Distillery	1–1	Belfast Celtic

==== Second replay ====
Team 1	Score	Team 2
Distillery	1–1	Belfast Celtic

==== Third replay ====
Team 1	Score	Team 2
Distillery	2–1	Belfast Celtic

=== Final ===
31 March 1906

Linfield	1–1	Distillery
Jones 75'	Report	Uprichard 79'

Solitude, Belfast
Attendance: 9,000
Referee: Tom Robertson (Glasgow)

==== Replay ====
14 April 1906
15:30 GMT

Linfield	2–0	Distillery
Roy 45'; Jones 70'	Report

Windsor Park, Belfast
Referee: Tom Robertson (Glasgow)
