= 1992–93 County Antrim Shield =

Tournament details
- Country: Northern Ireland
- Teams: 16

Final positions
- Champions: Carrick Rangers (1st win)
- Runners-up: Glentoran

Tournament statistics
- Matches played: 16
- Goals scored: 50 (3.13 per match)

The 1992–93 County Antrim Shield was the 104th edition of the County Antrim Shield, a cup competition in Northern Irish football.

Carrick Rangers won the tournament for the 1st time, defeating Glentoran 2–1 in the final replay after the first match finished in a 1–1 draw. For the 7th year running the County Antrim FA invited three clubs from County Armagh to compete (Glenavon, Newry Town and Portadown).

== Results ==
=== First round ===
Team 1	Score	Team 2
Ballyclare Comrades	0–4	Glentoran
Ballymena United	1–3	Carrick Rangers
Bangor	0–2	Ards
Cliftonville	2–0	Harland & Wolff Welders
Crusaders	4–0	Larne
Glenavon	4–3	Distillery
Linfield	2–0	East Belfast
Portadown	1–2	Newry Town

=== Quarter-finals ===
Team 1	Score	Team 2
Crusaders	1–0	Cliftonville
Glentoran	2–1	Ards
Linfield	2–3	Glenavon
Newry Town	1–4	Carrick Rangers

=== Semi-finals ===
Team 1	Score	Team 2
Carrick Rangers	1–0	Glentoran
Glentoran	1–1 (a.e.t.) (5–4 p)	Crusaders

=== Final ===
19 January 1993

Carrick Rangers	1–1 (a.e.t.)	Glentoran
Montgomery 69'		Kelly 5'

Windsor Park, Belfast

==== Replay ====
16 February 1993

Carrick Rangers	2–1	Glentoran
Martin 37'; Montgomery 80'	Report	Douglas 87'

Windsor Park, Belfast
Referee: Alan Snoddy (Carryduff)
