= 1899–1900 County Antrim Shield =

Tournament details
- Country: Ireland
- Date: 13 January 1900 – 11 April 1900
- Teams: 8

Final positions
- Champions: Distillery (5th win)
- Runners-up: Linfield

Tournament statistics
- Matches played: 14
- Goals scored: 35 (2.5 per match)

The 1899–1900 County Antrim Shield was the 12th edition of the County Antrim Shield, a cup competition in Irish football.

Distillery won the tournament for the 5th time, defeating Linfield 2–0 in the final replay after the original final ended in a 0–0 draw.

== Results ==
=== Quarter-finals ===
Team 1	Score	Team 2
Cliftonville	3–1^{1}	Celtic
Distillery	6–1	Celtic II
Glentoran	1–1	Cliftonville Olympic
Linfield	w/o	Linfield Swifts

- ^{1}The match was ordered to be replayed after a protest.

==== Replays ====
Team 1	Score	Team 2
Celtic	1–0^{1}	Cliftonville
Glentoran	3–2	Cliftonville Olympic

- ^{1}The match was ordered to be replayed after a protest.

==== Second replay ====
Team 1	Score	Team 2
Cliftonville	1–1	Celtic

==== Third replay ====
Team 1	Score	Team 2
Celtic	3–1	Cliftonville

=== Semi-finals ===
Team 1	Score	Team 2
Distillery	1–1	Celtic
Linfield	1–1	Glentoran

==== Replays ====
Team 1	Score	Team 2
Distillery	2–0	Celtic
Linfield	2–0	Glentoran

=== Final ===
31 March 1900

Distillery	0–0	Linfield
	Report

Solitude, Belfast
Attendance: 6,500
Referee: Tom Robertson (Scotland)

==== Replay ====
11 April 1900

Distillery	2–0	Linfield
Magill; Murphy	Report

Solitude, Belfast
Referee: Tom Robertson (Glasgow)
