= 1954–55 County Antrim Shield =

Tournament details
- Country: Northern Ireland
- Teams: 10

Final positions
- Champions: Linfield (22nd win)
- Runners-up: Crusaders

Tournament statistics
- Matches played: 13
- Goals scored: 31 (2.38 per match)

The 1954–55 County Antrim Shield was the 66th edition of the County Antrim Shield, a cup competition in Northern Irish football.

Linfield won the tournament for the 22nd time, defeating Crusaders 3–0 in the final at Solitude.

== Results ==
=== First round ===
Team 1	Score	Team 2
East Belfast	1–0	Ards
Glentoran	4–1	Dundela
Ballymena United	bye	
Bangor	bye	
Cliftonville	bye	
Crusaders	bye	
Distillery	bye	
Linfield	bye	

=== Quarter-finals ===
Team 1	Score	Team 2
Bangor	3–1	Glentoran
Cliftonville	0–0	Ballymena United
Crusaders	5–0	East Belfast
Linfield	2–0	Distillery

==== Replay ====
Team 1	Score	Team 2
Ballymena United	2–0	Cliftonville

=== Semi-finals ===
Team 1	Score	Team 2
Crusaders	1–1	Ballymena United
Linfield	1–1	Bangor

==== Replays ====
Team 1	Score	Team 2
Crusaders	2–0	Ballymena United
Linfield	1–1	Bangor

==== Second replay ====
Team 1	Score	Team 2
Linfield	1–0	Bangor

=== Final ===
28 May 1955
19:00 BST

Linfield	3–0	Crusaders
Dickson 2'; Kennedy 16', 23'	Report

Solitude, Belfast
Attendance: 12,000
