= 1978–79 County Antrim Shield =

Tournament details
- Country: Northern Ireland
- Teams: 13

Final positions
- Champions: Cliftonville (5th win)
- Runners-up: Crusaders

Tournament statistics
- Matches played: 12
- Goals scored: 41 (3.42 per match)

The 1978–79 County Antrim Shield was the 90th edition of the County Antrim Shield, a cup competition in Northern Irish football.

Cliftonville won the tournament for the 5th time, defeating Crusaders 3–1 on penalties after the final finished 0-0.

== Results ==
=== First round ===
Team 1	Score	Team 2
Ballyclare Comrades	2–1	Larne
Ballymena United	3–0	Carrick Rangers
Glentoran	0–4	Ards
Larne Olympic	2–4	Bangor
Linfield	2–1	Cromac Albion
Cliftonville	bye	
Crusaders	bye	
Distillery	bye	

=== Quarter-finals ===
Team 1	Score	Team 2
Ards	3–0	Linfield
Ballyclare Comrades	2–1	Ballymena United
Bangor	1–6	Cliftonville
Crusaders	2–0	Distillery

=== Semi-finals ===
Team 1	Score	Team 2
Ballyclare Comrades	0–2	Crusaders
Cliftonville	3–2	Ards

=== Final ===
14 May 1979
19:00 BST

Crusaders	0–0 (a.e.t.)	Cliftonville
	Report
Penalties
Simpson (penalty missed); McKenzie (penalty missed); Mulhall (penalty scored); Malone (penalty missed)	1–3	(penalty scored) Bell; (penalty scored) Mills; (penalty scored) McCusker

Seaview, Belfast
Referee: H. Wilson (Belfast)
