= 1933–34 County Antrim Shield =

Tournament details
- Country: Northern Ireland
- Teams: 11

Final positions
- Champions: Linfield (16th win)
- Runners-up: Ards

Tournament statistics
- Matches played: 15
- Goals scored: 81 (5.4 per match)

The 1933–34 County Antrim Shield was the 45th edition of the County Antrim Shield, a cup competition in Northern Irish football.

Linfield won the tournament for the 16th time and 3rd consecutive season, defeating Ards 7–1 in the final at Grosvenor Park.

== Results ==
=== First round ===
Team 1	Score	Team 2
Crusaders	3–3	Larne
Distillery	8–1	Bangor
Linfield	6–1	Ballymena
Ards	bye	
Belfast Celtic	bye	
Belfast Celtic II	bye	
Cliftonville	bye	
Glentoran	bye	

==== Replay ====
Team 1	Score	Team 2
Larne	2–2	Crusaders

==== Second replay ====
Team 1	Score	Team 2
Crusaders	1–3	Larne

=== Quarter-finals ===
Team 1	Score	Team 2
Cliftonville	4–5	Ards
Distillery	2–1	Belfast Celtic
Larne	2–3	Belfast Celtic II
Linfield	5–1	Glentoran

=== Semi-finals ===
Team 1	Score	Team 2
Ards	2–2	Belfast Celtic II
Linfield	2–2	Distillery

==== Replay ====
Team 1	Score	Team 2
Ards	1–1	Belfast Celtic II
Linfield	3–1	Distillery

==== Second replay ====
Team 1	Score	Team 2
Ards	4–2	Belfast Celtic II

=== Final ===
30 April 1934

Linfield	7–1	Ards
Caiels 24', 62'; Mackey 25', 70'; Bambrick 33', 54', 89'	Report	Gamble 43'

Grosvenor Park, Belfast
