= 1953–54 County Antrim Shield =

Tournament details
- Country: Northern Ireland
- Teams: 10

Final positions
- Champions: Distillery (12th win)
- Runners-up: Ballymena United

Tournament statistics
- Matches played: 9
- Goals scored: 27 (3 per match)

The 1953–54 County Antrim Shield was the 65th edition of the County Antrim Shield, a cup competition in Northern Irish football.

Distillery won the tournament for the 12th time, defeating Ballymena United 1–0 in the final at Solitude.

== Results ==
=== First round ===
Team 1	Score	Team 2
Ards	2–1	Linfield Swifts
Linfield	9–0	Crusaders Reserves
Ballymena United	bye	
Bangor	bye	
Cliftonville	bye	
Crusaders	bye	
Distillery	bye	
Glentoran	bye	

=== Quarter-finals ===
Team 1	Score	Team 2
Ards	0–1	Distillery
Ballymena United	1–0	Linfield
Cliftonville	0–4	Crusaders
Glentoran	2–0	Bangor

=== Semi-finals ===
Team 1	Score	Team 2
Ballymena United	3–2	Glentoran
Distillery	1–0	Crusaders

=== Final ===
8 May 1954

Distillery	1–0	Ballymena United
J. Wilson 40'	Report

Solitude, Belfast
