= 1932–33 County Antrim Shield =

Tournament details
- Country: Northern Ireland
- Teams: 11

Final positions
- Champions: Linfield (15th win)
- Runners-up: Belfast Celtic

Tournament statistics
- Matches played: 12
- Goals scored: 31 (2.58 per match)

The 1932–33 County Antrim Shield was the 44th edition of the County Antrim Shield, a cup competition in Northern Irish football.

Linfield won the tournament for the 15th time and 2nd consecutive season, defeating Belfast Celtic 3–1 in the second final replay at Solitude after the previous two matches finished in 1-1 draws.

== Results ==
=== First round ===
| Team 1 | Score | Team 2 |
|---|---|---|
| Bangor | 0–1 | Glentoran II |
| Cliftonville | 2–1 | Belfast Celtic II |
| Larne | 1–5 | Ballymena |
| Ards | bye | |
| Belfast Celtic | bye | |
| Distillery | bye | |
| Glentoran | bye | |
| Linfield | bye | |

=== Quarter-finals ===
| Team 1 | Score | Team 2 |
|---|---|---|
| Ards | 1–0 | Ballymena |
| Distillery | 0–1 | Belfast Celtic |
| Glentoran | 0–1 | Linfield |
| Glentoran II | 2–1 | Cliftonville |

=== Semi-finals ===
| Team 1 | Score | Team 2 |
|---|---|---|
| Belfast Celtic | 3–0 | Glentoran II |
| Linfield | 3–1 | Ards |

=== Final ===
26 April 1933

| Linfield | 1–1 | Belfast Celtic |
|---|---|---|
| Bambrick 3' | Report | Martin 43' |

Solitude, Belfast
Referee: P. Snape (Manchester)

==== Replay ====
5 May 1933

| Linfield | 1–1 | Belfast Celtic |
|---|---|---|
| Bambrick 13' | Report | Martin 65' |

Solitude, Belfast
Referee: P. Snape (Manchester)

==== Second replay ====
8 May 1933

| Linfield | 3–1 | Belfast Celtic |
|---|---|---|
| Priestley 10'; Bambrick 63'; Jones 68' (pen.) | Report | Mahood 48' |

Solitude, Belfast
Referee: P. Snape (Manchester)
