= 1925–26 County Antrim Shield =

Tournament details
- Country: Northern Ireland
- Teams: 11

Final positions
- Champions: Cliftonville (4th win)
- Runners-up: Glentoran

Tournament statistics
- Matches played: 12
- Goals scored: 51 (4.25 per match)

The 1925–26 County Antrim Shield was the 37th edition of the County Antrim Shield, a cup competition in Northern Irish football.

Cliftonville won the tournament for the 4th time, defeating Glentoran 5–1 in the final at Windsor Park.

== Results ==
=== First round ===
Team 1	Score	Team 2
Barn	1–4	Glentoran
Cliftonville	4–1	St Mary's
Distillery	4–3	Belfast Celtic
Larne	0–3	Queen's Island
Linfield	5–0	Summerfield
Ards	bye	

=== Quarter-finals ===
Team 1	Score	Team 2
Cliftonville	2–2	Ards
Glentoran	3–2	Linfield
Distillery	bye	
Queen's Island	bye	

==== Replay ====
Team 1	Score	Team 2
Ards	2–4	Cliftonville

=== Semi-finals ===
Team 1	Score	Team 2
Cliftonville	4–0	Distillery
Glentoran	0–0	Queen's Island

==== Replay ====
Team 1	Score	Team 2
Glentoran	1–0	Queen's Island

=== Final ===
20 February 1926

Cliftonville	5–1	Glentoran
Campion 1'; J. Jones 20'; Mortished 44', 85', 90'	Report	Armstrong 55'

Windsor Park, Belfast
Referee: Mr J. B. Stark
