= 1970–71 County Antrim Shield =

Tournament details
- Country: Northern Ireland
- Teams: 12

Final positions
- Champions: Glentoran (16th win)
- Runners-up: Crusaders

Tournament statistics
- Matches played: 12
- Goals scored: 34 (2.83 per match)

The 1970–71 County Antrim Shield was the 82nd edition of the County Antrim Shield, a cup competition in Northern Irish football.

Glentoran won the tournament for the 16th time, defeating Crusaders 2–1 in the final at Solitude.

== Results ==
=== First round ===
Team 1	Score	Team 2
Bangor	1–2	Islandmagee
Distillery	4–1	East Belfast
Glentoran	5–0	Dundonald
Larne	0–2	Crusaders
Ards	bye	
Ballymena United	bye	
Cliftonville	bye	
Linfield	bye	

=== Quarter-finals ===
Team 1	Score	Team 2
Ards	1–2	Glentoran
Ballymena United	3–0	Islandmagee
Crusaders	1–0	Cliftonville
Distillery	2–0	Linfield

=== Semi-finals ===
Team 1	Score	Team 2
Crusaders	3–1	Ballymena United
Glentoran	2–1	Distillery

=== Final ===
17 May 1971

Glentoran	2–1	Crusaders
Magill 32'; Morrow 40'	Report	Tuson 72'

Solitude, Belfast
Attendance: 2,000
Referee: H. Wilson (Belfast)
