= 1912–13 County Antrim Shield =

Tournament details
- Country: Ireland
- Date: 25 January 1913 – 17 May 1913
- Teams: 6

Final positions
- Champions: Linfield (6th win)
- Runners-up: Cliftonville

Tournament statistics
- Matches played: 7
- Goals scored: 12 (1.71 per match)

The 1912–13 County Antrim Shield was the 24th edition of the County Antrim Shield, a cup competition in Irish football. The tournament returned this season after the senior clubs refused to compete for the competition in 1911–12 due to a dispute with the Irish Football Association.

Linfield won the tournament for the 6th time, defeating Cliftonville 1–0 in the second final replay at The Oval after the original final and replay finished in 0-0 draws.

== Results ==
=== Quarter-finals ===
Team 1	Score	Team 2
Glentoran	3–0	Belfast Celtic II
Linfield	3–1	Belfast Celtic
Cliftonville	bye	
Distillery	bye	

=== Semi-finals ===
Team 1	Score	Team 2
Cliftonville	2–1	Glentoran
Linfield	1–0	Distillery

=== Final ===
22 March 1913

Linfield	0–0	Cliftonville
	Report

Celtic Park, Belfast

==== Replay ====
26 April 1913

Linfield	0–0	Cliftonville
	Report

Grosvenor Park, Belfast

==== Second replay ====
17 May 1913

Linfield	1–0 (a.e.t.)	Cliftonville
Clifford 99'	Report

The Oval, Belfast
Attendance: 6,000
Referee: Mr G. B. F. Stork
