= 1908–09 County Antrim Shield =

Tournament details
- Country: Ireland
- Date: 30 January 1909 – 27 March 1909
- Teams: 6

Final positions
- Champions: Glentoran II (1st win)
- Runners-up: Cliftonville

Tournament statistics
- Matches played: 5
- Goals scored: 20 (4 per match)

The 1908–09 County Antrim Shield was the 21st edition of the County Antrim Shield, a cup competition in Irish football.

Glentoran II (the reserve team of Glentoran) won the tournament for the 1st time, defeating Cliftonville 3–0 in the final at Celtic Park.

== Results ==
=== Quarter-finals ===
Team 1	Score	Team 2
Belfast Celtic	3–5	Glentoran II
Linfield	0–2	Glentoran
Cliftonville	bye	
Distillery	bye	

=== Semi-finals ===
Team 1	Score	Team 2
Cliftonville	4–2	Distillery
Glentoran II	1–0	Glentoran

=== Final ===
27 March 1909

Glentoran II	3–0	Cliftonville
McKnight	Report

Celtic Park, Belfast
Attendance: 5,000
