= 1890–91 County Antrim Shield =

Tournament details
- Country: Ireland
- Date: 13 December 1890 – 21 March 1891
- Teams: 8

Final positions
- Champions: Black Watch (1st win)
- Runners-up: Oldpark

Tournament statistics
- Matches played: 8
- Goals scored: 48 (6 per match)

The 1890–91 County Antrim Shield was the 3rd edition of the County Antrim Shield, a cup competition in Irish football.

Black Watch (a British Army football team) won the tournament for the 1st time, defeating Oldpark 4–2 in the final.

== Results ==
=== Quarter-finals ===
Team 1	Score	Team 2
Clarence	7–0	Rifle Brigade
Distillery	2–2	Cliftonville
Ligoniel	2–7	Black Watch
Oldpark	6–0	Milltown

==== Replay ====
Team 1	Score	Team 2
Cliftonville	2–5	Distillery

=== Semi-finals ===
Team 1	Score	Team 2
Black Watch	2–1	Distillery
Oldpark	5–1	Clarence

=== Final ===
21 March 1891

Black Watch	4–2	Oldpark
Reynolds; Malcolm; McGee	Report	Johnston; Thompson

Solitude, Belfast
