= 1961–62 County Antrim Shield =

Tournament details
- Country: Northern Ireland
- Teams: 12

Final positions
- Champions: Linfield (26th win)
- Runners-up: Glentoran

Tournament statistics
- Matches played: 13
- Goals scored: 63 (4.85 per match)

The 1961–62 County Antrim Shield was the 73rd edition of the County Antrim Shield, a cup competition in Northern Irish football.

Linfield won the tournament for the 26th time and 2nd consecutive season, defeating Glentoran 5–0 in the final at Solitude.

== Results ==
=== First round ===
Team 1	Score	Team 2
Albert Foundry	1–5	Crusaders
Cliftonville	2–2	Carrick Rangers
Distillery	4–2	Ballymena United Reserves
Glentoran	3–2	Dundela
Ards	bye	
Ballymena United	bye	
Bangor	bye	
Linfield	bye	

==== Replay ====
Team 1	Score	Team 2
Cliftonville	3–4	Carrick Rangers

=== Quarter-finals ===
Team 1	Score	Team 2
Ballymena United	2–2	Distillery
Crusaders	2–1	Carrick Rangers
Glentoran	6–3	Ards
Linfield	3–0	Bangor

==== Replay ====
Team 1	Score	Team 2
Distillery	1–3	Ballymena United

=== Semi-finals ===
Team 1	Score	Team 2
Glentoran	2–1	Crusaders
Linfield	3–1	Ballymena United

=== Final ===
12 May 1962

Linfield	5–0	Glentoran
Dickson 9', 48'; Barr 44' (pen.), 59', 72'	Report

Solitude, Belfast
Referee: S. Carswell (Belfast)
