= 1916–17 County Antrim Shield =

Tournament details
- Country: Ireland
- Date: 13 January 1917 – 3 March 1917
- Teams: 6

Final positions
- Champions: Linfield (8th win)
- Runners-up: Glentoran

Tournament statistics
- Matches played: 5
- Goals scored: 13 (2.6 per match)

The 1916–17 County Antrim Shield was the 28th edition of the County Antrim Shield, a cup competition in Irish football.

Linfield won the tournament for the 8th time, defeating Glentoran 1–0 in the final at Celtic Park.

== Results ==
=== Quarter-finals ===
Team 1	Score	Team 2
Belfast United	1–2	Linfield
Cliftonville	0–1	Belfast Celtic II
Distillery	bye	
Glentoran	bye	

=== Semi-finals ===
Team 1	Score	Team 2
Glentoran	3–2	Distillery
Linfield	1–0	Belfast Celtic II

=== Final ===
3 March 1917

Linfield	3–0	Glentoran
Houston; McEwan	Report

Celtic Park, Belfast
