= 1963–64 County Antrim Shield =

Tournament details
- Country: Northern Ireland
- Teams: 12

Final positions
- Champions: Distillery (13th win)
- Runners-up: Glentoran

Tournament statistics
- Matches played: 13
- Goals scored: 57 (4.38 per match)

The 1963–64 County Antrim Shield was the 75th edition of the County Antrim Shield, a cup competition in Northern Irish football.

Distillery won the tournament for the 13th time, defeating Glentoran 2–1 in the final at Solitude.

== Results ==
=== First round ===
Team 1	Score	Team 2
Crusaders	2–0	Larne
Distillery	7–0	Queen's University
Glentoran	3–0	Dundela
Linfield	4–0	St Elizabeth's Recreation
Ards	bye	
Ballymena United	bye	
Bangor	bye	
Cliftonville	bye	

=== Quarter-finals ===
Team 1	Score	Team 2
Ards	1–3	Glentoran
Ballymena United	2–2	Crusaders
Cliftonville	2–2	Distillery
Linfield	5–1	Bangor

==== Replays ====
Team 1	Score	Team 2
Crusaders	1–4	Ballymena United
Distillery	3–0	Cliftonville

=== Semi-finals ===
Team 1	Score	Team 2
Distillery	5–1	Ballymena United
Glentoran	5–1	Linfield

=== Final ===
9 May 1964

Distillery	2–1	Glentoran
Burke 5'; Campbell 16'	Report	Bruce 11'

Solitude, Belfast
Referee: S. Carswell (Belfast)
