= 1940–41 County Antrim Shield =

Tournament details
- Country: Northern Ireland
- Teams: 13

Final positions
- Champions: Glentoran (10th win)
- Runners-up: Distillery

Tournament statistics
- Matches played: 13
- Goals scored: 60 (4.62 per match)

The 1940–41 County Antrim Shield was the 52nd edition of the County Antrim Shield, a cup competition in Northern Irish football.

Glentoran won the tournament for the 10th time and 2nd consecutive season, defeating Lisburn Distillery 1–0 in the final at Windsor Park.

== Results ==
=== First round ===
Team 1	Score	Team 2
Ards	4–1	Bangor Reserves
Cliftonville	1–3	Belfast Celtic
Distillery	11–3	Royal Ulster Rifles
Distillery II	2–3	Glentoran
Linfield	3–0	Royal Irish Fusiliers
Cliftonville	bye	
Larne	bye	
Royal Inniskilling Fusiliers	bye	

=== Quarter-finals ===
Team 1	Score	Team 2
Ards	0–5	Distillery
Bangor	2–2	Royal Inniskilling Fusiliers
Larne	0–2	Glentoran
Linfield	2–1	Belfast Celtic

==== Replay ====
Team 1	Score	Team 2
Bangor	3–0	Royal Inniskilling Fusiliers

=== Semi-finals ===
Team 1	Score	Team 2
Distillery	6–1	Linfield
Glentoran	3–1	Bangor

=== Final ===
14 May 1941

Glentoran	1–0	Distillery
Grice	Report

Windsor Park, Belfast
Referee: Mr W. Cowan
