= 1943–44 County Antrim Shield =

Tournament details
- Country: Northern Ireland
- Teams: 10

Final positions
- Champions: Glentoran (11th win)
- Runners-up: Belfast Celtic

Tournament statistics
- Matches played: 9
- Goals scored: 23 (2.56 per match)

The 1943–44 County Antrim Shield was the 55th edition of the County Antrim Shield, a cup competition in Northern Irish football.

Glentoran won the tournament for the 11th time, defeating Belfast Celtic 3–0 in the final at Solitude.

== Results ==
=== First round ===
Team 1	Score	Team 2
Ballyclare Comrades	2–4	Glentoran
Larne	5–0	Glentoran II
Ards	bye	
Bangor	bye	
Belfast Celtic	bye	
Cliftonville	bye	
Distillery	bye	
Linfield	bye	

=== Quarter-finals ===
Team 1	Score	Team 2
Ards	0–3	Distillery
Glentoran	2–1	Cliftonville
Larne	5–2	Bangor
Linfield	1–8	Belfast Celtic

=== Semi-finals ===
Team 1	Score	Team 2
Belfast Celtic	2–1	Distillery
Glentoran	4–1	Larne

=== Final ===
2 May 1944

Glentoran	3–0	Belfast Celtic
Gregg; Neary	Report

Solitude, Belfast
