= 1958–59 County Antrim Shield =

Tournament details
- Country: Northern Ireland
- Teams: 10

Final positions
- Champions: Linfield (24th win)
- Runners-up: Bangor

Tournament statistics
- Matches played: 10
- Goals scored: 35 (3.5 per match)

The 1958–59 County Antrim Shield was the 70th edition of the County Antrim Shield, a cup competition in Northern Irish football.

Linfield won the tournament for the 24th time and 2nd consecutive season, defeating Bangor 3–1 in the final at Solitude.

== Results ==
=== First round ===
Team 1	Score	Team 2
Ballymena United	5–0	Larne
Distillery	2–0	Crusaders Reserves
Ards	bye	
Bangor	bye	
Cliftonville	bye	
Crusaders	bye	
Glentoran	bye	
Linfield	bye	

=== Quarter-finals ===
Team 1	Score	Team 2
Ards]	4–0	Glentoran
Cliftonville	0–2	Ballymena United
Crusaders	2–3	Bangor
Distillery	2–5	Linfield

=== Semi-finals ===
Team 1	Score	Team 2
Bangor	2–1	Ards
Linfield	0–0	Ballymena United

==== Replay ====
Team 1	Score	Team 2
Linfield	3–0	Ballymena United

=== Final ===
9 May 1959

Linfield	3–1	Bangor
Cairns 12', 49'; Dickson 75'	Report	McGreevy 65'

Solitude, Belfast
Attendance: 8,000
Referee: S. Carswell (Belfast)
