= 1939–40 County Antrim Shield =

Tournament details
- Country: Northern Ireland
- Teams: 11

Final positions
- Champions: Glentoran (9th win)
- Runners-up: Linfield

Tournament statistics
- Matches played: 12
- Goals scored: 47 (3.92 per match)

The 1939–40 County Antrim Shield was the 51st edition of the County Antrim Shield, a cup competition in Northern Irish football.

Glentoran won the tournament for the 9th time, defeating Linfield 4–0 in the final at Solitude.

== Results ==
=== First round ===
Team 1	Score	Team 2
Ards	2–2	Linfield Swifts
Bangor	2–3	Ballymena United
Crusaders	2–2	Distillery
Belfast Celtic	bye	
Cliftonville	bye	
Glentoran	bye	
Larne	bye	
Linfield	bye	

==== Replays ====
Team 1	Score	Team 2
Distillery	3–0	Crusaders
Linfield Swifts	3–0	Ards

=== Quarter-finals ===
Team 1	Score	Team 2
Ballymena United	6–2	Cliftonville
Belfast Celtic	3–1	Linfield Swifts
Distillery	2–3	Linfield
Glentoran	4–0	Larne

=== Semi-finals ===
Team 1	Score	Team 2
Glentoran	2–0	Ballymena United
Linfield	1–0	Belfast Celtic

=== Final ===
24 April 1940

Glentoran	4–0	Linfield
Robinson 40', 84'; Grice 46'; Smith 88'	Report

Solitude, Belfast
Referee: Mr T. Bentley (Manchester)
