= 1956–57 County Antrim Shield =

Tournament details
- Country: Northern Ireland
- Teams: 10

Final positions
- Champions: Glentoran (14th win)
- Runners-up: Distillery

Tournament statistics
- Matches played: 10
- Goals scored: 28 (2.8 per match)

The 1956–57 County Antrim Shield was the 68th edition of the County Antrim Shield, a cup competition in Northern Irish football.

Glentoran won the tournament for the 14th time, defeating Distillery 4–0 in the final replay at Solitude after the original final ended in a 0–0 draw.

== Results ==
=== First round ===
Team 1	Score	Team 2
Crusaders	3–1	Linfield Swifts
Larne	1–2	Cliftonville
Ards	bye	
Ballymena United	bye	
Bangor	bye	
Distillery	bye	
Glentoran	bye	
Linfield	bye	

=== Quarter-finals ===
Team 1	Score	Team 2
Ards	5–0	Cliftonville
Bangor	0–1	Glentoran
Distillery	2–1	Crusaders
Linfield	0–1	Ballymena United

=== Semi-finals ===
Team 1	Score	Team 2
Distillery	3–2	Ballymena United
Glentoran	2–0	Ards

=== Final ===
13 May 1957

Glentoran	0–0	Distillery
	Report

Solitude, Belfast

==== Replay ====
18 May 1957

Glentoran	4–0	Distillery
Thompson 22', 55'; Mulvey 44'; Hughes 75'	Report

Solitude, Belfast
