= 1942–43 County Antrim Shield =

Tournament details
- Country: Northern Ireland
- Teams: 11

Final positions
- Champions: Belfast Celtic (7th win)
- Runners-up: Linfield

Tournament statistics
- Matches played: 13
- Goals scored: 63 (4.85 per match)

The 1942–43 County Antrim Shield was the 54th edition of the County Antrim Shield, a cup competition in Northern Irish football.

Belfast Celtic won the tournament for the 7th time, defeating Linfield 2–1 in the second final replay at Solitude after two previous draws.

== Results ==
=== First round ===
| Team 1 | Score | Team 2 |
|---|---|---|
| Belfast Celtic | 7–1 | Cliftonville |
| Distillery | 4–2 | Larne Olympic |
| Linfield | 4–1 | Victoria Works |
| Ards | bye | |
| Bangor | bye | |
| Glentoran | bye | |
| Larne | bye | |
| Royal Irish Fusiliers | bye | |

=== Quarter-finals ===
| Team 1 | Score | Team 2 |
|---|---|---|
| Ards | 2–3 | Linfield |
| Bangor | 2–1 | Distillery |
| Belfast Celtic | 2–2 | Glentoran |
| Larne | 7–1 | Royal Irish Fusiliers |

==== Replay ====
| Team 1 | Score | Team 2 |
|---|---|---|
| Glentoran | 1–3 | Belfast Celtic |

=== Semi-finals ===
| Team 1 | Score | Team 2 |
|---|---|---|
| Belfast Celtic | 5–2 | Bangor |
| Linfield | 5–1 | Larne |

=== Final ===
6 May 1943

| Belfast Celtic | 0–0 | Linfield |
|---|---|---|
| | Report |

Solitude, Belfast

==== Replay ====
13 May 1943

| Belfast Celtic | 2–2 | Linfield |
|---|---|---|
| Byrne 10'; O'Neill 35' (pen.) | Report | Rae 13'; Bryson 30' (pen.) |

Solitude, Belfast

==== Second replay ====
21 May 1943

| Belfast Celtic | 2–1 | Linfield |
|---|---|---|
| Townsend; Hollinger | Report | McWilliams |

Solitude, Belfast
