= 1977–78 County Antrim Shield =

Tournament details
- Country: Northern Ireland
- Teams: 13

Final positions
- Champions: Glentoran (17th win)
- Runners-up: Crusaders

Tournament statistics
- Matches played: 12
- Goals scored: 33 (2.75 per match)

The 1977–78 County Antrim Shield was the 89th edition of the County Antrim Shield, a cup competition in Northern Irish football.

Glentoran won the tournament for the 17th time, defeating Crusaders 1–0 in the final.

== Results ==
=== First round ===
| Team 1 | Score | Team 2 |
|---|---|---|
| Ballyclare Comrades | 1–1 (5–4 p) | Larne |
| Ballymena United | 0–1 | Chimney Corner |
| Distillery | 3–0 | Stranmillis College |
| Glentoran | 3–0 | Downpatrick Recreation |
| Linfield | 3–0 | Bangor |
| Ards | bye | |
| Cliftonville | bye | |
| Crusaders | bye | |

=== Quarter-finals ===
| Team 1 | Score | Team 2 |
|---|---|---|
| Ballyclare Comrades | 0–1 | Linfield |
| Cliftonville | A–A^{1} | Glentoran |
| Crusaders | 4–1 | Ards |
| Distillery | 2–2 (5–3 p) | Chimney Corner |

^{1} Match abandoned at 0-0 due to crowd trouble. Cliftonville refused to play again and tie was awarded to Glentoran.

=== Semi-finals ===
| Team 1 | Score | Team 2 |
|---|---|---|
| Crusaders | 3–2 | Linfield |
| Glentoran | 3–2 | Distillery |

=== Final ===
16 May 1978

| Glentoran | 1–0 | Crusaders |
|---|---|---|
| Feeney 55' | Report |

Windsor Park, Belfast
Referee: F. McKnight (Newtownards)
