= 1897–98 County Antrim Shield =

Tournament details
- Country: Ireland
- Date: 15 January 1898 – 12 March 1898
- Teams: 8

Final positions
- Champions: Cliftonville (3rd win)
- Runners-up: Linfield

Tournament statistics
- Matches played: 8
- Goals scored: 35 (4.38 per match)

The 1897–98 County Antrim Shield was the 10th edition of the County Antrim Shield, a cup competition in Irish football.

Cliftonville won the tournament for the 3rd time, defeating Linfield 2–0 in the final.

== Results ==
=== Quarter-finals ===
Team 1	Score	Team 2
Cliftonville	5–2	Glentoran
Distillery	1–2	Celtic
Dunmurry	2–8	North Staffordshire Regiment
Wesley	0–7	Linfield

=== Semi-finals ===
Team 1	Score	Team 2
Cliftonville	3–1	Celtic
Linfield	2–0	North Staffordshire Regiment

=== Final ===
12 March 1898

Cliftonville	2–0	Linfield
A. Campbell; J. Campbell	Report

Grosvenor Park, Belfast
Attendance: 4,000
