= 1946–47 County Antrim Shield =

Tournament details
- Country: Northern Ireland
- Teams: 8

Final positions
- Champions: Linfield (20th win)
- Runners-up: Belfast Celtic

Tournament statistics
- Matches played: 8
- Goals scored: 21 (2.63 per match)

The 1946–47 County Antrim Shield was the 58th edition of the County Antrim Shield, a cup competition in Northern Irish football.

Linfield won the tournament for the 20th time. The final was not played as Belfast Celtic would not agree to the proposed fixture date of 11 June and the trophy was subsequently awarded to Linfield.

== Results ==
=== Quarter-finals ===
Team 1	Score	Team 2
Ballymena United	2–3	Belfast Celtic
Cliftonville	0–3	Glentoran
Crusaders	0–3	Linfield
Distillery	0–1	Linfield Swifts

=== Semi-finals ===
Team 1	Score	Team 2
Belfast Celtic	0–0	Glentoran
Linfield	3–2	Linfield Swifts

==== Replay ====
Team 1	Score	Team 2
Belfast Celtic	3–1 (a.e.t.)	Glentoran

=== Final ===
11 June 1947

Linfield	not played	Belfast Celtic
	Report
