= 1937–38 County Antrim Shield =

Tournament details
- Country: Northern Ireland
- Teams: 11

Final positions
- Champions: Linfield (18th win)
- Runners-up: Ballymena United

Tournament statistics
- Matches played: 11
- Goals scored: 54 (4.91 per match)

The 1937–38 County Antrim Shield was the 49th edition of the County Antrim Shield, a cup competition in Northern Irish football.

Linfield won the tournament for the 18th time, defeating Ballymena United 3–2 in the final at Grosvenor Park.

== Results ==
=== First round ===
Team 1	Score	Team 2
Belfast Celtic	2–0	Distillery
Glentoran	6–1	Glentoran II
Summerfield	1–3	Linfield
Ards	bye	
Ballymena United	bye	
Bangor	bye	
Cliftonville	bye	
Larne	bye	

=== Quarter-finals ===
Team 1	Score	Team 2
Ballymena United	3–0	Bangor
Belfast Celtic	7–0	Larne
Glentoran	2–4	Cliftonville
Linfield	8–1	Ards

=== Semi-finals ===
Team 1	Score	Team 2
Ballymena United	3–2	Cliftonville
Linfield^{1}	1–1	Belfast Celtic

^{1}Belfast Celtic refused to play the replay and Linfield advanced to the final.

=== Final ===
27 April 1938

Linfield	3–2	Ballymena United
Rosbotham 26'; Marshall 31', 55'	Report	Wilkin 53'; Mitchell 85' (pen.)

Grosvenor Park, Belfast
Referee: Charles McLean
