= 1930–31 County Antrim Shield =

Tournament details
- Country: Northern Ireland
- Teams: 11

Final positions
- Champions: Glentoran (8th win)
- Runners-up: Cliftonville

Tournament statistics
- Matches played: 12
- Goals scored: 53 (4.42 per match)

The 1930–31 County Antrim Shield was the 42nd edition of the County Antrim Shield, a cup competition in Northern Irish football.

Glentoran won the tournament for the 8th time, defeating Cliftonville 2–1 in the final at Grosvenor Park.

== Results ==
=== First round ===
Team 1	Score	Team 2
Ballymena	1–1	Ards
Distillery	4–3	Crusaders
Larne	4–3	Belfast Celtic
Bangor	bye	
Charleville	bye	
Cliftonville	bye	
Glentoran	bye	
Linfield	bye	

==== Replay ====
Team 1	Score	Team 2
Ards	3–1	Ballymena

=== Quarter-finals ===
Team 1	Score	Team 2
Bangor	2–1	Linfield
Cliftonville	3–1	Charleville
Glentoran	2–1	Distillery
Larne	1–1	Ards

==== Replay ====
Team 1	Score	Team 2
Ards	5–3	Larne

=== Semi-finals ===
Team 1	Score	Team 2
Cliftonville	4–0	Ards
Glentoran	5–0	Bangor

=== Final ===
22 April 1931

Glentoran	2–1	Cliftonville
Roberts 17', 77'	Report	McGuire 20' (pen.)

Grosvenor Park, Belfast
Referee: M. Hutton (Glasgow)
