= 1968–69 County Antrim Shield =

Tournament details
- Country: Northern Ireland
- Teams: 12

Final positions
- Champions: Crusaders (3rd win)
- Runners-up: Linfield

Tournament statistics
- Matches played: 11
- Goals scored: 43 (3.91 per match)

The 1968–69 County Antrim Shield was the 80th edition of the County Antrim Shield, a cup competition in Northern Irish football.

Crusaders won the tournament for the 3rd time, defeating Linfield 2–1 in the final at Solitude.

== Results ==
=== First round ===
Team 1	Score	Team 2
Ards	5–0	Glentoran II
Crusaders	4–3	Queen's University
Distillery	3–0	Comber Recreation
Larne	4–0	Cliftonville
Ballymena United	bye	
Bangor	bye	
Glentoran	bye	
Linfield	bye	

=== Quarter-finals ===
Team 1	Score	Team 2
Crusaders	4–1	Ballymena United
Glentoran	3–1	Ards
Larne	3–0	Bangor
Linfield	4–0	Distillery

=== Semi-finals ===
Team 1	Score	Team 2
Crusaders	2–0	Glentoran
Linfield	2–1	Larne

=== Final ===
17 May 1969

Crusaders	2–1	Linfield
Hume 12'; Meldrum 19' (pen.)	Report	Hamilton 56'

Solitude, Belfast
Referee: Jack Adair (Belfast)
