= 1900–01 County Antrim Shield =

Tournament details
- Country: Ireland
- Date: 19 January 1901 – 30 March 1901
- Teams: 8

Final positions
- Champions: Glentoran (1st win)
- Runners-up: Cliftonville

Tournament statistics
- Matches played: 7
- Goals scored: 33 (4.71 per match)

The 1900–01 County Antrim Shield was the 13th edition of the County Antrim Shield, a cup competition in Irish football.

Glentoran won the tournament for the 1st time, defeating Cliftonville 2–1 in the final at Myrtlefield.

== Results ==
=== Quarter-finals ===
Team 1	Score	Team 2
Cliftonville	2–0	Distillery West End
Cliftonville Olympic	2–8	Glentoran
Distillery	5–3	Celtic
Linfield	w/o	Larne

=== Semi-finals ===
Team 1	Score	Team 2
Cliftonville	2–1	Linfield
Glentoran	2–2	Distillery

==== Replay ====
Team 1	Score	Team 2
Glentoran	3–0	Distillery

=== Final ===
30 March 1901

Glentoran	2–1	Cliftonville
Johnston; Leonard	Report	Kirkwood

Myrtlefield, Belfast
