= 1894–95 County Antrim Shield =

Tournament details
- Country: Ireland
- Date: 24 November 1894 – 13 April 1895
- Teams: 8

Final positions
- Champions: Celtic (1st win)
- Runners-up: Distillery

Tournament statistics
- Matches played: 10
- Goals scored: 51 (5.1 per match)

The 1894–95 County Antrim Shield was the 7th edition of the County Antrim Shield, a cup competition in Irish football.

Celtic won the tournament for the 1st time, defeating Distillery 3–1 in the final.

== Results ==
=== Quarter-finals ===
Team 1	Score	Team 2
Celtic	4–2	Milltown
Cliftonville	9–0	Eglantine
Distillery	9–1	Wesley
Highfield	3–3 (a.e.t.)	Ligoniel

==== Replay ====
Team 1	Score	Team 2
Ligoniel	4–2	Highfield

=== Semi-finals ===
Team 1	Score	Team 2
Distillery	2–1	Cliftonville
Ligoniel	2–0^{1}	Celtic

- ^{1} The match was ordered to be replayed after a protest.

==== Replay ====
Team 1	Score	Team 2
Celtic	1–1	Ligoniel

==== Second replay ====
Team 1	Score	Team 2
Celtic	2–1	Ligoniel

=== Final ===
13 April 1895

Celtic	3–1	Distillery
McAuley; Farrell	Report	Bruce

Solitude, Belfast
