= 1902–03 County Antrim Shield =

Tournament details
- Country: Ireland
- Date: 17 January 1903 – 2 May 1903
- Teams: 7

Final positions
- Champions: Distillery (6th win)
- Runners-up: Linfield

Tournament statistics
- Matches played: 9
- Goals scored: 32 (3.56 per match)

The 1902–03 County Antrim Shield was the 15th edition of the County Antrim Shield, a cup competition in Irish football.

Distillery won the tournament for the 6th time, defeating Linfield 4–1 in the final replay at Solitude, after the original final ended in a 1–1 draw.

== Results ==
=== Quarter-finals ===
Team 1	Score	Team 2
Distillery	5–0	Ulster
Glentoran	2–0	Belfast Celtic
Linfield	2–2	Highfield
Cliftonville	bye	

==== Replay ====
Team 1	Score	Team 2
Linfield	10–0	Highfield

=== Semi-finals ===
Team 1	Score	Team 2
Distillery	2–1	Glentoran
Linfield	0–0	Cliftonville

==== Replay ====
Team 1	Score	Team 2
Linfield	1–0	Cliftonville

=== Final ===
4 April 1903

Distillery	1–1	Linfield
Mercer	Report	Maxwell 2'

Solitude, Belfast
Attendance: 8,000
Referee: Fred Kirkham (Preston)

==== Replay ====
2 May 1903

Distillery	4–1	Linfield
Kearns; McDougall; Aiken; Hamilton	Report	Hagan

Solitude, Belfast
Attendance: 7,000
Referee: Fred Kirkham (Preston)
