= 1938–39 County Antrim Shield =

Tournament details
- Country: Northern Ireland
- Teams: 11

Final positions
- Champions: Belfast Celtic (6th win)
- Runners-up: Glentoran

Tournament statistics
- Matches played: 10
- Goals scored: 51 (5.1 per match)

The 1938–39 County Antrim Shield was the 50th edition of the County Antrim Shield, a cup competition in Northern Irish football.

Belfast Celtic won the tournament for the 6th time, defeating Glentoran 2–1 in the final at Grosvenor Park.

== Results ==
=== First round ===
Team 1	Score	Team 2
Crusaders	2–5	Glentoran
Distillery	4–1	Sirocco Works
Linfield	3–2	Bangor
Ards	bye	
Ballymena United	bye	
Belfast Celtic	bye	
Cliftonville	bye	
Larne	bye	

=== Quarter-finals ===
Team 1	Score	Team 2
Belfast Celtic	7–1	Larne
Cliftonville	2–1	Distillery
Glentoran	3–2	Ards
Linfield	4–3	Ballymena United

=== Semi-finals ===
Team 1	Score	Team 2
Belfast Celtic	3–1	Linfield
Glentoran	4–0	Cliftonville

=== Final ===
19 April 1939

Belfast Celtic	2–1	Glentoran
O'Connor 18', 70'	Report	Lavery 77'

Grosvenor Park, Belfast
Referee: Mr R. E. Mortimer
