= 1955–56 County Antrim Shield =

Tournament details
- Country: Northern Ireland
- Teams: 10

Final positions
- Champions: Ards (1st win)
- Runners-up: Linfield

Tournament statistics
- Matches played: 12
- Goals scored: 51 (4.25 per match)

The 1955–56 County Antrim Shield was the 67th edition of the County Antrim Shield, a cup competition in Northern Irish football.

Ards won the tournament for the 1st time, defeating Linfield 4–1 in the final at The Oval.

== Results ==
=== First round ===
Team 1	Score	Team 2
Brantwood	0–0	Bangor
Crusaders	4–2	Carrick Rangers
Ards	bye	
Ballymena United	bye	
Cliftonville	bye	
Distillery	bye	
Glentoran	bye	
Linfield	bye	

==== Replay ====
Team 1	Score	Team 2
Bangor	5–2	Brantwood

=== Quarter-finals ===
Team 1	Score	Team 2
Ards	3–1	Crusaders
Cliftonville	1–3	Bangor
Distillery	1–0	Glentoran
Linfield	7–1	Ballymena United

=== Semi-finals ===
Team 1	Score	Team 2
Ards	0–0	Distillery
Linfield	1–1	Bangor

==== Replays ====
Team 1	Score	Team 2
Ards	2–1	Distillery
Linfield	6–1	Bangor

=== Final ===
12 May 1956
19:00 BST

Ards	4–1	Linfield
Walker 3' (pen.); Gildea 62', 81'; Monroe 71'	Report	Dickson 45'

The Oval, Belfast
