= 1929–30 County Antrim Shield =

Tournament details
- Country: Northern Ireland
- Teams: 12

Final positions
- Champions: Linfield (13th win)
- Runners-up: Glentoran

Tournament statistics
- Matches played: 11
- Goals scored: 54 (4.91 per match)

The 1929–30 County Antrim Shield was the 41st edition of the County Antrim Shield, a cup competition in Northern Irish football.

Linfield won the tournament for the 13th time and 3rd consecutive year, defeating Glentoran 3–1 in the final at Solitude.

== Results ==
=== First round ===
Team 1	Score	Team 2
Ballymena	1–5	Bangor
Belfast Celtic	4–1	Cliftonville
Distillery	7–4	Larne
Ards	bye	
Broadway United	bye	
Glentoran	bye	
Linfield	bye	
Linfield Rangers	bye	

=== Quarter-finals ===
Team 1	Score	Team 2
Ards	6–2	Bangor
Belfast Celtic	1–2	Broadway United
Distillery	2–2	Glentoran
Linfield Rangers	1–3	Linfield

==== Replay ====
Team 1	Score	Team 2
Glentoran	3–1	Distillery

=== Semi-finals ===
Team 1	Score	Team 2
Glentoran	2–1	Ards
Linfield	2–0	Broadway United

=== Final ===
9 April 1930

Linfield	3–1	Glentoran
Bambrick 23', 25', 87'	Report	Thoms 75'

Solitude, Belfast
Referee: H. Watson (Glasgow)
