= 1893–94 County Antrim Shield =

Tournament details
- Country: Ireland
- Date: 20 January 1893 – 24 March 1894
- Teams: 6

Final positions
- Champions: Cliftonville (2nd win)
- Runners-up: Celtic

Tournament statistics
- Matches played: 5
- Goals scored: 24 (4.8 per match)

The 1893–94 County Antrim Shield was the 6th edition of the County Antrim Shield, a cup competition in Irish football.

Cliftonville won the tournament for the 2nd time, defeating Celtic 2–1 in the final.

== Results ==
=== Quarter-finals ===
Team 1	Score	Team 2
Celtic	3–0	Milltown
Cliftonville	4–1	Rosebank
Distillery	bye	
Ligoniel	bye	

=== Semi-finals ===
Team 1	Score	Team 2
Celtic	2–0	Ligoniel
Distillery	3–8	Cliftonville

=== Final ===
24 March 1894

Cliftonville	2–1	Celtic
G. Williamson; Baird	Report	Somerset

Grosvenor Park, Belfast
Attendance: 3,000
