= 1889–90 County Antrim Shield =

Tournament details
- Country: Ireland
- Date: 2 November 1889 – 22 March 1890
- Teams: 12

Final positions
- Champions: not awarded

Tournament statistics
- Matches played: 10
- Goals scored: 80 (8 per match)

The 1889–90 County Antrim Shield was the 2nd edition of the County Antrim Shield, a cup competition in Irish football.

Linfield were leading Distillery 5–3 in the final with several minutes remaining when the match was abandoned due to unruly crowd behaviour. The County Antrim FA subsequently withheld the Shield. To date, this is the only year there has been no winner of the Country Antrim Shield in the competition's history.

== Results ==
=== First round ===
Team 1	Score	Team 2
Black Watch	10–1	Whiteabbey
Cliftonville	4–2	North End Athletics
Distillery	15–0	Clarence
Gordon Highlanders	6–3	Distillery Rovers
Linfield	7–0	Belfast Athletics
Oldpark	w/o	YMCA

=== Second round ===
Team 1	Score	Team 2
Cliftonville	7–0	Oldpark
Gordon Highlanders	5–2	Black Watch
Distillery	bye	
Linfield	bye	

=== Semi-finals ===
Team 1	Score	Team 2
Distillery	5–0	Cliftonville
Linfield	3–2	Gordon Highlanders

=== Final (abandoned) ===
22 March 1890

Linfield	A–A	Distillery
	Report

Ulster Cricket Ground, Belfast
Referee: Mr Elleman
