= 1949–50 County Antrim Shield =

Tournament details
- Country: Northern Ireland
- Teams: 10

Final positions
- Champions: Glentoran (12th win)
- Runners-up: Linfield

Tournament statistics
- Matches played: 13
- Goals scored: 42 (3.23 per match)

The 1949–50 County Antrim Shield was the 61st edition of the County Antrim Shield, a cup competition in Northern Irish football.

Glentoran won the tournament for the 12th time, defeating Linfield 2–0 in the final at Solitude.

== Results ==
=== First round ===
Team 1	Score	Team 2
Albert Foundry	1–2	Crusaders
Crusaders Reserves	2–2	Cliftonville
Ards	bye	
Ballymena United	bye	
Bangor	bye	
Distillery	bye	
Glentoran	bye	
Linfield	bye	

==== Replay ====
Team 1	Score	Team 2
Cliftonville	2–0	Crusaders Reserves

=== Quarter-finals ===
Team 1	Score	Team 2
Ballymena United	1–2	Bangor
Cliftonville	1–1	Linfield
Crusaders	0–0	Distillery
Glentoran	4–2	Ards

==== Replays ====
Team 1	Score	Team 2
Distillery	1–1	Crusaders
Linfield	4–2	Cliftonville

==== Second replay ====
Team 1	Score	Team 2
Distillery	3–0	Crusaders

=== Semi-finals ===
Team 1	Score	Team 2
Glentoran	6–0	Distillery
Linfield	3–0	Bangor

=== Final ===
13 May 1950

Glentoran	2–0	Linfield
Feeney 68'; Lowry 90'	Report

Solitude, Belfast
