= 1918–19 County Antrim Shield =

Tournament details
- Country: Ireland
- Date: 11 January 1919 – 19 March 1919
- Teams: 7

Final positions
- Champions: Distillery (9th win)
- Runners-up: Belfast Celtic

Tournament statistics
- Matches played: 9
- Goals scored: 14 (1.56 per match)

The 1918–19 County Antrim Shield was the 30th edition of the County Antrim Shield, a cup competition in Irish football.

Distillery won the tournament for the 9th time, defeating Belfast Celtic 1–0 in the final replay at Windsor Park, after the original final at The Oval finished 0–0.

== Results ==
=== Quarter-finals ===
Team 1	Score	Team 2
Belfast United	0–4	Belfast Celtic
Cliftonville	0–0^{1}	Glentoran II
Glentoran	0–0	Linfield
Distillery	bye	

^{1}Glentoran II were expelled from the tournament for fielding an ineligible player

==== Replay ====
Team 1	Score	Team 2
Linfield	3–1	Glentoran

=== Semi-finals ===
Team 1	Score	Team 2
Belfast Celtic	1–1	Linfield
Distillery	1–0	Cliftonville

==== Replay ====
Team 1	Score	Team 2
Belfast Celtic	2–0	Linfield

=== Final ===
1 March 1919

Distillery	0–0	Belfast Celtic
	Report

The Oval, Belfast
Attendance: 13,000
Referee: Mr W. Cowan

==== Replay ====
19 March 1919

Distillery	1–0	Belfast Celtic
D. Reid 15'	Report

Windsor Park, Belfast
Referee: Mr W. Cowan
