= 1982–83 County Antrim Shield =

Tournament details
- Country: Northern Ireland
- Teams: 13

Final positions
- Champions: Linfield (34th win)
- Runners-up: Glentoran

Tournament statistics
- Matches played: 12
- Goals scored: 41 (3.42 per match)

The 1982–83 County Antrim Shield was the 94th edition of the County Antrim Shield, a cup competition in Northern Irish football.

Linfield won the tournament for the 34th time and 3rd season in a row, defeating Glentoran 4–1 in the final.

== Results ==
=== First round ===
Team 1	Score	Team 2
Ards	1–0	RUC
Ballymena United	3–5	Cliftonville
Bangor	1–5	Dundela
Carrick Rangers	0–2	Crusaders
Linfield	5–1	STC
Distillery	bye	
Glentoran	bye	
Larne	bye	

=== Quarter-finals ===
Team 1	Score	Team 2
Ards	1–0	Dundela
Crusaders	0–1	Glentoran
Distillery	3–1	Larne
Linfield	2–1	Cliftonville

=== Semi-finals ===
Team 1	Score	Team 2
Glentoran	2–0	Ards
Linfield	2–0	Distillery

=== Final ===
12 May 1983

Linfield	4–1	Glentoran
Crawford 5'; Anderson 8'; Murray	Report	Manley 67'

Windsor Park, Belfast
Attendance: 8,000
Referee: R. Stewart (Belfast)
