= 1952–53 County Antrim Shield =

Tournament details
- Country: Northern Ireland
- Teams: 10

Final positions
- Champions: Linfield (21st win)
- Runners-up: Distillery

Tournament statistics
- Matches played: 15
- Goals scored: 53 (3.53 per match)

The 1952–53 County Antrim Shield was the 64th edition of the County Antrim Shield, a cup competition in Northern Irish football.

Linfield won the tournament for the 21st time, defeating Distillery 2–1 in the second final replay at Solitude after two previous draws.

== Results ==
=== First round ===
Team 1	Score	Team 2
Ballymena United	2–2	Brantwood
Larne	0–5	Linfield
Ards	bye	
Bangor	bye	
Cliftonville	bye	
Crusaders	bye	
Distillery	bye	
Glentoran	bye	

==== Replays ====
Team 1	Score	Team 2
Brantwood	3–3	Ballymena United

==== Second replay ====
Team 1	Score	Team 2
Ballymena United	2–1	Brantwood

=== Quarter-finals ===
Team 1	Score	Team 2
Ballymena United	0–0	Ards
Bangor	0–2	Linfield
Distillery	1–0	Crusaders
Glentoran	3–1	Cliftonville

==== Replay ====
Team 1	Score	Team 2
Ards	5–1	Ballymena United

=== Semi-finals ===
Team 1	Score	Team 2
Distillery	1–1	Glentoran
Linfield	2–1	Ards

==== Replay ====
Team 1	Score	Team 2
Distillery	2–0	Glentoran

=== Final ===
9 May 1953

Linfield	2–2	Distillery
Dickson 28', 86' (pen.)	Report	Wilson 42'; Mulgrew 73'

Solitude, Belfast

==== Replay ====
13 May 1953

Linfield	4–4 (a.e.t.)	Distillery
Dickson; Nixon; McDowell	Report	Price; Dodds

Solitude, Belfast
Referee: F. Thurman (Preston)

==== Second replay ====
18 May 1953

Linfield	2–1	Distillery
Lunn 4'; Dickson 82'	Report	McAdam 53'

Solitude, Belfast
