= 1926–27 County Antrim Shield =

Tournament details
- Country: Northern Ireland
- Teams: 11

Final positions
- Champions: Belfast Celtic (3rd win)
- Runners-up: Dunmurry

Tournament statistics
- Matches played: 10
- Goals scored: 45 (4.5 per match)

The 1926–27 County Antrim Shield was the 38th edition of the County Antrim Shield, a cup competition in Northern Irish football.

Belfast Celtic won the tournament for the 3rd time, defeating Dunmurry 3–2 in the final at Solitude.

== Results ==
=== First round ===
Team 1	Score	Team 2
Belfast Celtic	2–0	Linfield
Cliftonville	0–1	Larne
Queen's Island	1–3	Crusaders
Ards	bye	
Barn	bye	
Distillery	bye	
Dunmurry	bye	
Glentoran	bye	

=== Quarter-finals ===
Team 1	Score	Team 2
Distillery	2–3	Ards
Dunmurry	5–1	Barn
Glentoran	2–4	Belfast Celtic
Larne	2–3	Crusaders

=== Semi-finals ===
Team 1	Score	Team 2
Belfast Celtic	5–1	Crusaders
Dunmurry	3–2	Ards

=== Final ===
27 April 1927

Belfast Celtic	3–2	Dunmurry
Curran 40', 78'; S. Mahood 55'	Report	Wright 43' (pen.); Close 53'

Solitude, Belfast
Referee: Mr W. Cowan
