= 1915–16 County Antrim Shield =

Tournament details
- Country: Ireland
- Date: 22 January 1916 – 18 March 1916
- Teams: 8

Final positions
- Champions: Glentoran (4th win)
- Runners-up: Distillery

Tournament statistics
- Matches played: 8
- Goals scored: 15 (1.88 per match)

The 1915–16 County Antrim Shield was the 27th edition of the County Antrim Shield, a cup competition in Irish football.

Glentoran won the tournament for the 4th time, defeating Distillery 1–0 in the final at Solitude.

== Results ==
=== Quarter-finals ===
Team 1	Score	Team 2
Belfast Celtic	1–3	Distillery
Belfast United	0–1	Glentoran
Cliftonville	0–2	Linfield
Glentoran II	2–0	Linfield Swifts}

=== Semi-finals ===
Team 1	Score	Team 2
Distillery	3–1	Linfield
Glentoran	0–0	Glentoran II

==== Replay ====
Team 1	Score	Team 2
Glentoran	1–0	Glentoran II

=== Final ===
18 March 1916

Glentoran	1–0	Distillery
Boyd	Report

Solitude, Belfast
Attendance: 10,000
Referee: Mr J. Baker (Nantwich)
