= 1923–24 County Antrim Shield =

Tournament details
- Country: Northern Ireland
- Teams: 10

Final positions
- Champions: Queen's Island (1st win)
- Runners-up: Distillery

Tournament statistics
- Matches played: 14
- Goals scored: 41 (2.93 per match)

The 1923–24 County Antrim Shield was the 35th edition of the County Antrim Shield, a cup competition in Northern Irish football.

Queen's Island won the tournament for the 1st time, defeating Distillery 3–0 in the final at Windsor Park.

== Results ==
=== First round ===
Team 1	Score	Team 2
Barn	1–3	Bangor
Cliftonville	3–1	Glentoran
Larne	2–4	Distillery
Queen's Island	2–2	Linfield
Woodburn	1–1	Ards

==== Replays ====
Team 1	Score	Team 2
Ards	0–1	Woodburn
Linfield	0–5	Queen's Island

=== Quarter-finals ===
Team 1	Score	Team 2
Bangor	1–1	Queen's Island
Cliftonville	bye	
Distillery	bye	
Woodburn	bye	

==== Replay ====
Team 1	Score	Team 2
Queen's Island	2–0	Bangor

=== Semi-finals ===
Team 1	Score	Team 2
Distillery	3–1	Woodburn
Queen's Island	0–0	Cliftonville

==== Replay ====
Team 1	Score	Team 2
Queen's Island	0–0	Cliftonville

==== Second replay ====
Team 1	Score	Team 2
Queen's Island	3–1	Cliftonville

=== Final ===
19 April 1924
19:00 GMT

Queen's Island	3–0	Distillery
Gowdy; McCleery; Cowan	Report

Windsor Park, Belfast
