= 1976–77 County Antrim Shield =

Tournament details
- Country: Northern Ireland
- Teams: 13

Final positions
- Champions: Linfield (31st win)
- Runners-up: Glentoran

Tournament statistics
- Matches played: 12
- Goals scored: 49 (4.08 per match)

The 1976–77 County Antrim Shield was the 88th edition of the County Antrim Shield, a cup competition in Northern Irish football.

Linfield won the tournament for the 31st time, defeating Glentoran 3–1 in the final.

== Results ==
=== First round ===
Team 1	Score	Team 2
Ards II	2–1	Ballymena United
Brantwood	0–2	Bangor
Cliftonville	5–1	Albert Foundry
Crusaders	2–0	Ballyclare Comrades
Larne	1–0	Ards
Distillery	bye	
Glentoran	bye	
Linfield	bye	

=== Quarter-finals ===
Team 1	Score	Team 2
Ards II	2–5	Larne
Bangor	2–1	Crusaders
Cliftonville	1–2	Glentoran
Linfield	5–4	Distillery

=== Semi-finals ===
Team 1	Score	Team 2
Glentoran	3–1	Bangor
Linfield	3–2	Larne

=== Final ===
14 May 1977

Linfield	3–1	Glentoran
Rafferty 40'; Martin 60'; Hewitt 86'	Report	McCreery 23'

Windsor Park, Belfast
Referee: Hugh Wilson (Belfast)
