= 1969–70 County Antrim Shield =

Tournament details
- Country: Northern Ireland
- Teams: 12

Final positions
- Champions: Bangor (1st win)
- Runners-up: Ards

Tournament statistics
- Matches played: 17
- Goals scored: 42 (2.47 per match)

The 1969–70 County Antrim Shield was the 81st edition of the County Antrim Shield, a cup competition in Northern Irish football.

Bangor won the tournament for the 1st time, defeating Ards 3–2 in the third final replay at Solitude after three previously drawn matches.

== Results ==
=== First round ===
Team 1	Score	Team 2
Ballyclare Comrades	1–2	Linfield
Bangor	1–0	Dunmurry Recreation
Chimney Corner	2–2	Ards
Larne	1–0	Glentoran
Ballymena United	bye	
Cliftonville	bye	
Crusaders	bye	
Distillery	bye	

==== Replay ====
Team 1	Score	Team 2
Ards	1–1	Chimney Corner

==== Second replay ====
Team 1	Score	Team 2
Ards	2–1	Chimney Corner

=== Quarter-finals ===
Team 1	Score	Team 2
Ards	3–0	Crusaders
Distillery	0–4	Bangor
Larne	2–0	Ballymena United
Linfield	1–0	Cliftonville

=== Semi-finals ===
Team 1	Score	Team 2
Ards	3–1	Linfield
Bangor	1–1	Larne

==== Replay ====
Team 1	Score	Team 2
Bangor	1–0	Larne

=== Final ===
9 May 1970

Bangor	1–1	Ards
Gregg 89'	Report	Shields 64'

Solitude, Belfast
Referee: J. Russell (Belfast)

==== Replay ====
12 May 1970

Bangor	1–1	Ards
Gregg 75'; Murphy (red card)	Report	Burke 85'

Solitude, Belfast
Referee: J. Russell (Belfast)

==== Second replay ====
18 May 1970

Bangor	1–1 (a.e.t.)	Ards
Mulgrew 65'	Report	McAteer 33'

Solitude, Belfast

==== Third replay ====
22 May 1970

Bangor	3–2	Ards
	Report

Solitude, Belfast
