= Sam Napier (footballer) =

Irish footballer

Personal information
- Full name: Samuel Napier
- Date of birth: 28 July 1883
- Place of birth: Belfast, Ireland
- Position: Centre forward

Senior career*
Years	Team	Apps	(Gls)
1904–1905	Glentoran		
1905–1906	Bolton Wanderers	4	(0)
1906–1907	Glossop	27	(14)
1907–1908	Linfield		
1908	Glentoran		
Total		31	(14)
- * Club domestic league appearances and goals

Samuel Napier (28 July 1883–unknown) was an Irish footballer who played in the Football League for Bolton Wanderers and Glossop.
