= David Rainey (footballer) =

Northern Irish footballer

Personal information
- Date of birth: 6 April 1976 (age 50)
- Place of birth: Belfast, Northern Ireland
- Height: 1.78 m (5 ft 10 in)
- Position: Striker

Team information
- Current team: Crusaders (assistant manager)

Senior career*
Years	Team	Apps	(Gls)
1996–1998	Ballyclare Comrades	?	(19)
1998–2000	Glentoran	68	(13)
2000–2005	Ards	111	(23)
2005–2013	Crusaders	221	(79)
2013–2014	Glenavon	30	(7)
2014–2019	Harland & Wolff Welders	40	(14)

Managerial career
- 2022–2024: Crusaders Reserves
- 2024–: Crusaders (assistant manager)
- * Club domestic league appearances and goals as of 17:45, 27 April 2014

David Rainey (born 6 April 1976) is a retired footballer from Northern Ireland who played as a striker, and is currently assistant manager at Crusaders.

== Club career ==
=== Early career ===
Davy previously played for Glentoran and Ards. He won many trophies while in East Belfast, including an Irish League title and Irish Cup medal. While with Ards, he won the Irish First Division title in 2001.

=== Crusaders ===
In 2005, he dropped down a division to join Crusaders, for whom he hit 30 goals in his first season to ensure immediate promotion, as well as winning the Intermediate League Cup and Steel & Sons Cup. In the following season in the top flight, he scored 13 goals overall, 2 behind the Crues' top scorer Davy Larmour. In the 2007–08 season he scored in the 2008 CIS Cup Final, but two late Linfield goals ensured the Crues' were defeated 3–2. It was Rainey's first cup final goal, and he was named in the 2008 Irish League Select XI as a result after 24 goals that season.

He came on as a substitute in the 2008–09 Irish Cup final as Crusaders defeated Cliftonville. In that season he was joint-top scorer with Mark Dickson with 17. He was again the Crues' top scorer in 2009–10 with 19 in all competitions, adding the County Antrim Shield to his Crusaders' trophy collection.

In 2010-11 he found himself mostly as substitute to Jordan Owens and Michael Halliday, and scored just one league goal with 8 overall. The following season, he added the Irish League Cup and the Setanta Cup to his trophy collection, meaning he has won every domestic honour available. He was once again the club's top scorer in 2011–12, with 20 goals.

Rainey's final season with Crusaders was the 2012–13 season, where he scored 8 goals, all in the league. Fittingly, in his final match for the club he scored the winning goal in a 2–1 win at Windsor Park against Linfield on the final day of the season. It was his 139th goal in 320 games for the Hatchetmen, making him the fifth-highest goalscorer at the time in Crusaders' history, after Glenn Hunter (157 goals), Curry Mulholland (149 goals), Danny Hale (143 goals) and Jim Weatherup (142 goals). His tally has since been surpassed also by Jordan Owens.

== Coaching career ==
In 2022 Rainey took over as manager of Crusaders Reserves/U20 side, winning the NIFL Premiership Development League in his first season. On 8 May 2024 he was announced as first team assistant manager to newly appointed manager Declan Caddell.

== Honours ==
Ballyclare Comrades

- Ulster Cup: 1997–98

Glentoran

- Irish League: 1998–99
- Irish Cup: 1999–2000
- Gold Cup: 1998–99, 1999–2000
- County Antrim Shield: 1998–99, 1999–2000

Ards

- Irish First Division: 2000–01

Crusaders

- Irish Cup: 2008–09
- Setanta Cup: 2012
- Irish League Cup: 2011–12
- County Antrim Shield: 2009–10
- Irish First Division: 2005–06
- IFA Intermediate League Cup: 2005–06
- Steel & Sons Cup: 2005–06

Glenavon

- Irish Cup: 2013–14
