= 1966–67 European Cup Winners' Cup =

Final positions
- Champions: (West Germany) Bayern Munich (1st title)
- Runners-up: (Scotland) Rangers

Tournament statistics
- Matches played: 61
- Goals scored: 170 (2.79 per match)
- Top scorer: Roger Claessen (Standard Liège) 10 goals

The 1966–67 season of the European Cup Winners' Cup club football competition was won by Bayern Munich with a 1–0 final victory over Rangers, who had eliminated holders Borussia Dortmund. It was the fourth time in six years that the final required at least extra time to decide the winners.

== Teams ==
(Austria) Rapid Wien (CR)	(Belgium) Standard Liège (CW)	(Bulgaria) Slavia Sofia (CW)	(Cyprus) Apollon Limassol (CW)
(Czechoslovakia) Tatran Prešov (CR)	(Denmark) AaB (CW)	(England) Everton (CW)	(Finland) Åbo IFK (CW)
(France) Strasbourg (CW)	(East Germany) BSG Chemie Leipzig (CW)	(West Germany) Bayern Munich (CW)	(West Germany) Borussia Dortmund (2nd)^{TH}
(Greece) AEK Athens (CW)	(Hungary) Vasas ETO Győr (CW)	(Iceland) Valur (CW)	(Republic of Ireland) Shamrock Rovers (CW)
(Italy) Fiorentina (CW)	Spora Luxembourg (CW)	(Malta) Floriana (CW)	(Netherlands) Sparta Rotterdam (CW)
(Northern Ireland) Glentoran (CW)	(Norway) Skeid (CW)	(Poland) Legia Warsaw (CW)	(Portugal) Braga (CW)
(Romania) Steaua București (CW)	(Scotland) Rangers (CW)	(Spain) Zaragoza (CW)	(Switzerland) Servette (CR)
(Turkey) Galatasaray (CW)	(Soviet Union) Spartak Moscow (CW)	(Wales) Swansea Town (CW)	(Socialist Federal Republic of Yugoslavia) OFK Beograd (CW)

== Preliminary round ==
Team 1	Agg.	Team 2	1st leg	2nd leg
Valur (Iceland)	2–9	(Belgium) Standard Liège	1–1	1–8

=== First leg ===
22 August 1966

Valur (Iceland)	1–1	(Belgium) Standard Liège
Elísson 58'		Claessen 65'

Laugardalsvöllur, Reykjavík
Referee: John Adair (Northern Ireland)

=== Second leg ===
31 August 1966

Standard Liège (Belgium)	8–1	(Iceland) Valur
Claessen 6', 10', 18', 61', 76'; Dewalque 8', 59'; Pilot 15'		Júlíusson 32'

Stade Maurice Dufrasne, Liège
Referee: Ad Boogaerts (Netherlands)

Standard Liège won 9–2 on aggregate.

== Bracket ==
First round
(Socialist Federal Republic of Yugoslavia) OFK Beograd	1	0	1
(Soviet Union) Spartak Moscow	3	3	6
(Austria) Rapid Wien	4	5	9
(Turkey) Galatasaray	0	3	3
(Republic of Ireland) Shamrock Rovers	4	4	8
Spora Luxembourg	1	1	2
(Czechoslovakia) Tatran Prešov	1	2	3
(West Germany) Bayern Munich	1	3	4
(Italy) Fiorentina	1	2	3
(Hungary) Vasas ETO Győr	0	4	4
(Greece) AEK Athens	0	2	2
(Portugal) Braga	1	3	4
(East Germany) BSG Chemie Leipzig	3	2	5
(Poland) Legia Warsaw	0	2	2
(Belgium) Standard Liège	5	1	6
(Cyprus) Apollon Limassol	1	0	1
(Switzerland) Servette	1	2	3
(Finland) Åbo IFK	1	1	2
(Malta) Floriana	1	0	1
(Netherlands) Sparta Rotterdam	1	6	7
(France) Strasbourg	1	1	2
(Romania) Steaua București	0	1	1
(Wales) Swansea Town	1	0	1
(Bulgaria) Slavia Sofia	1	4	5
(Northern Ireland) Glentoran	1	0	1
(Scotland) Rangers	1	4	5
(Norway) Skeid	3	1	4
(Spain) Zaragoza	2	3	5
(Denmark) AaB	0	1	1
(England) Everton	0	2	2

Second round
(Soviet Union) Spartak Moscow	1	0	1
(Austria) Rapid Wien	1	1	2
(Republic of Ireland) Shamrock Rovers	1	2	3
(West Germany) Bayern Munich	1	3	4
(Hungary) Vasas ETO Győr	3	0	3
(Portugal) Braga	0	2	2
(East Germany) BSG Chemie Leipzig	2	0	2
(Belgium) Standard Liège (a)	1	1	2
(Switzerland) Servette	2	0	2
(Netherlands) Sparta Rotterdam	0	1	1
(France) Strasbourg	1	0	1
(Bulgaria) Slavia Sofia	0	2	2
(Scotland) Rangers	2	0	2
(West Germany) Borussia Dortmund	1	0	1
(Spain) Zaragoza	2	0	2
(England) Everton	0	1	1

Quarter-finals
(Austria) Rapid Wien	1	0	1
(West Germany) Bayern Munich (a.e.t.)	0	2	2
(Hungary) Vasas ETO Győr	2	0	2
(Belgium) Standard Liège	1	2	3
(Switzerland) Servette	1	0	1
(Bulgaria) Slavia Sofia	0	3	3
(Scotland) Rangers (c)	2	0	2
(Spain) Zaragoza	0	2	2

Semi-finals
(West Germany) Bayern Munich	2	3	5
(Belgium) Standard Liège	0	1	1
(Bulgaria) Slavia Sofia	0	0	0
(Scotland) Rangers	1	1	2

Final
(West Germany) Bayern Munich (a.e.t.)	1
(Scotland) Rangers	0

== First round ==
Team 1	Agg.	Team 2	1st leg	2nd leg
OFK Beograd (Socialist Federal Republic of Yugoslavia)	1–6	(Soviet Union) Spartak Moscow	1–3	0–3
Rapid Wien (Austria)	9–3	(Turkey) Galatasaray	4–0	5–3
Shamrock Rovers (Republic of Ireland)	8–2	Spora Luxembourg	4–1	4–1
Tatran Prešov (Czechoslovakia)	3–4	(West Germany) Bayern Munich	1–1	2–3
Fiorentina (Italy)	3–4	(Hungary) Vasas ETO Győr	1–0	2–4
AEK Athens (Greece)	2–4	(Portugal) Braga	0–1	2–3
BSG Chemie Leipzig (East Germany)	5–2	(Poland) Legia Warsaw	3–0	2–2
Standard Liège (Belgium)	6–1	(Cyprus) Apollon Limassol	5–1	1–0
Servette (Switzerland)	3–2	(Finland) Åbo IFK	1–1	2–1
Floriana (Malta)	1–7	(Netherlands) Sparta Rotterdam	1–1	0–6
Strasbourg (France)	2–1	(Romania) Steaua București	1–0	1–1
Swansea Town (Wales)	1–5	(Bulgaria) Slavia Sofia	1–1	0–4
Glentoran (Northern Ireland)	1–5	(Scotland) Rangers	1–1	0–4
Borussia Dortmund (West Germany)	Bye		n/a	n/a
Skeid (Norway)	4–5	(Spain) Zaragoza	3–2	1–3
AaB (Denmark)	1–2	(England) Everton	0–0	1–2

=== First leg ===
28 September 1966

OFK Beograd (Socialist Federal Republic of Yugoslavia)	1–3	(Soviet Union) Spartak Moscow
Krivokuća 52'		Syomin 10', 16'; Logofet 36'

JNA Stadium, Belgrade
Referee: Erwin Vetter (East Germany)

24 September 1966

Rapid Wien (Austria)	4–0	(Turkey) Galatasaray
Seitl 7', 21'; Flögel 33'; Bjerregaard 63'

Praterstadion, Vienna
Referee: Karl Göppel (Switzerland)

28 September 1966

Shamrock Rovers (Republic of Ireland)	4–1	Spora Luxembourg
Fullam 8'; Dixon 29'; Kearin 55'; O'Neill 74' (pen.)		Weis 28'

Dalymount Park, Dublin
Referee: Robert Lacoste (France)

28 September 1966

Tatran Prešov (Czechoslovakia)	1–1	(West Germany) Bayern Munich
Čaban 13'		Roth 21'

Tatran Stadion, Prešov
Referee: Wacław Majdan (Poland)

28 September 1966

Fiorentina (Italy)	1–0	(Hungary) Vasas ETO Győr
Chiarugi 61'

Stadio Comunale, Florence
Referee: Gerhard Schulenburg (West Germany)

28 September 1966
16:00 EET

AEK Athens (Greece)	0–1	(Portugal) Braga
	Report	Luciano 26'

AEK Stadium, Athens
Attendance: 23,207
Referee: Lajos Horvath (Hungary)

28 September 1966

BSG Chemie Leipzig (East Germany)	3–0	(Poland) Legia Warsaw
Bauchspieß 58', 85'; Scherbarth 78'

Zentralstadion, Leipzig
Referee: Piet Roomer (Netherlands)

18 September 1966

Standard Liège (Belgium)	5–1	(Cyprus) Apollon Limassol
Claessen 25'; Bleser 43'; Dewalque 46', 52'; Germano 50'		Ioannou 80'

Stade Maurice Dufrasne, Liège
Attendance: 9,178
Referee: Hans Granlund (Norway)

14 September 1966

Servette (Switzerland)	1–1	(Finland) Åbo IFK
Conti 43'		Laine 65'

Charmilles Stadium, Geneva
Referee: Gyula Emsberger (Hungary)

18 September 1966

Floriana (Malta)	1–1	(Netherlands) Sparta Rotterdam
Phillips 65'		Kemper 28'

Empire Stadium, Gżira
Referee: Antonio Sbardella (Italy)

5 October 1966

Strasbourg (France)	1–0	(Romania) Steaua București
Muller 56'	Report

Stade de la Meinau, Strasbourg
Attendance: 14,204
Referee: Tiny Wharton (Scotland)

21 September 1966

Swansea Town (Wales)	1–1	(Bulgaria) Slavia Sofia
Todd 60'		Tasev 80'

Vetch Field, Swansea
Referee: Magnús Pétursson (Iceland)

27 September 1966

Glentoran (Northern Ireland)	1–1	(Scotland) Rangers
Sinclair 90'		McLean 16'

The Oval, Belfast
Referee: Vital Loraux (Belgium)

30 August 1966

Skeid (Norway)	3–2	(Spain) Zaragoza
Sjøberg 3', 81'; Kristoffersen 86'		Reija 65'; Canário 75'

Bislett Stadium, Oslo
Referee: Jack Taylor (England)

28 September 1966

AaB (Denmark)	0–0	(England) Everton

Aalborg Stadium, Aalborg
Referee: Antoine Queudeville (Luxembourg)

=== Second leg ===
5 October 1966

Spartak Moscow (Soviet Union)	3–0	(Socialist Federal Republic of Yugoslavia) OFK Beograd
Syomin 55'; Khusainov 59'; Bokatov 79'

Central Lenin Stadium, Moscow
Referee: Nicolae Mihăilescu (Romania)

Spartak Moscow won 6–1 on aggregate.

7 September 1966

Galatasaray (Turkey)	3–5	(Austria) Rapid Wien
Elmastaşoğlu 17'; Acuner 43'; Gökdel 88'		Bjerregaard 21', 60'; Fritsch 27'; Seitl 36', 46'

Ali Sami Yen Stadium, Istanbul
Referee: Kestutis Andziulis (Soviet Union)

Rapid Wien won 9–3 on aggregate.

5 October 1966

Spora Luxembourg	1–4	(Republic of Ireland) Shamrock Rovers
Krier 35'		Kearin 17'; Dixon 42', 75'; O'Neill 69'

Stade Municipal, Luxembourg City
Referee: Kurt Handwerker (West Germany)

Shamrock Rovers won 8–2 on aggregate.

5 October 1966

Bayern Munich (West Germany)	3–2	(Czechoslovakia) Tatran Prešov
Brenninger 32'; Müller 72', 73'		Pavlovič 56', 84'

Grünwalder Stadion, Munich
Referee: Antonio Sbardella (Italy)

Bayern Munich won 4–3 on aggregate.

5 October 1966

Vasas ETO Győr (Hungary)	4–2	(Italy) Fiorentina
Stolcz 9' 60'; Varsányi 36'; Orbán 86'		Bertini 20'; De Sisti 32'

Vagogyári ETO pálya, Győr
Referee: Friedrich Mayer (Austria)

Raba ETO Győr won 4–3 on aggregate.

5 October 1966
17:00 EET

Braga (Portugal)	3–2	(Greece) AEK Athens
Espingardeiro 15'; Perrichon 30', 44'	Report	Papaioannou 6'; Coimbra 87' (o.g.)

Estádio 28 de Maio, Braga
Attendance: 13,892
Referee: John Adair (Northern Ireland)

Braga won 4–2 on aggregate.

12 October 1966

Legia Warsaw (Poland)	2–2	(East Germany) BSG Chemie Leipzig
Bauchspieß 17', 29'		Korzeniowski 40'; Żmijewski 88'

Polish Army Stadium, Warsaw
Referee: Erik Beijar (Finland)

BSG Chemie Leipzig won 5–2 on aggregate.

5 October 1966

Apollon Limassol (Cyprus)	0–1	(Belgium) Standard Liège
		Claessen 78'

Stade des Bas-Prés, Namur
Attendance: 5,534
Referee: Hans-Joachim Weyland (West Germany)

Standard Liège won 6-1 on aggregate.

5 October 1966

Åbo IFK (Finland)	1–2	(Switzerland) Servette
Laine 51'		Németh 43'; Schindelholz 67'

Olympic Stadium, Helsinki
Referee: Aage Poulsen (Denmark)

Servette won 3-2 on aggregate.

5 October 1966

Sparta Rotterdam (Netherlands)	6–0	(Malta) Floriana
Kemper 16', 83'; Vermolen 21', 62'; Bosveld 40'; Bouman 78'

De Kuip, Rotterdam
Referee: Haydn Davies (Wales)

Sparta Rotterdam won 7-1 on aggregate.

12 October 1966

Steaua București (Romania)	1–1	(France) Strasbourg
Avram 68'	Report	Hausser 61'

Stadionul 23 August, Bucharest
Attendance: 14,204
Referee: Michalakis Kirikiades (Cyprus)

Strasbourg won 2–1 on aggregate.

5 October 1966

Slavia Sofia (Bulgaria)	4–0	(Wales) Swansea Town
Tasev 6', 68', 87'; Vragev 46'

Vasil Levski National Stadium, Sofia
Referee: Doğan Babacan (Turkey)

Slavia Sofia won 5–1 on aggregate.

5 October 1966

Rangers (Scotland)	4–0	(Northern Ireland) Glentoran
Johnston 9'; D. Smith 44'; Setterington 70'; McLean 77'

Ibrox Stadium, Glasgow
Referee: José María Ortiz de Mendíbil (Spain)

Rangers won 5–1 on aggregate.

12 October 1966

Zaragoza (Spain)	3–1	(Norway) Skeid
Santos 17'; Pais 54'; Marcelino 85'		Thorsen 84' (pen.)

La Romareda, Zaragoza
Referee: William O'Neill (Republic of Ireland)

Zaragoza won 5–4 on aggregate.

11 October 1966

Everton (England)	2–1	(Denmark) AaB
Morrissey 57'; Ball 71'		Lildballe 69'

Goodison Park, Liverpool
Referee: Aníbal Oliveira (Portugal)

Everton won 2–1 on aggregate.

== Second round ==
Team 1	Agg.	Team 2	1st leg	2nd leg
Spartak Moscow (Soviet Union)	1–2	(Austria) Rapid Wien	1–1	0–1
Shamrock Rovers (Republic of Ireland)	3–4	(West Germany) Bayern Munich	1–1	2–3
Vasas ETO Győr (Hungary)	3–2	(Portugal) Braga	3–0	0–2
BSG Chemie Leipzig (East Germany)	2–2 (a)	(Belgium) Standard Liège	2–1	0–1
Servette (Switzerland)	2–1	(Netherlands) Sparta Rotterdam	2–0	0–1
Strasbourg (France)	1–2	(Bulgaria) Slavia Sofia	1–0	0–2
Rangers (Scotland)	2–1	(West Germany) Borussia Dortmund	2–1	0–0
Zaragoza (Spain)	2–1	(England) Everton	2–0	0–1

=== First leg ===
9 November 1966

Spartak Moscow (Soviet Union)	1–1	(Austria) Rapid Wien
Khusainov 40'		Bjerregaard 23'

Central Lenin Stadium, Moscow
Referee: Ryszard Banasiuk (Poland)

9 November 1966
Second round

Shamrock Rovers (Republic of Ireland)	1–1	(West Germany) Bayern Munich
Dixon 61'	Report	Koulmann 17'

Dalymount Park, Dublin
Attendance: 22,000
Referee: Laurens van Ravens (Netherlands)

9 November 1966

Vasas ETO Győr (Hungary)	3–0	(Portugal) Braga
Szaló 3', 73'; Oliveira 72' (o.g.)

Vagogyári ETO pálya, Győr
Attendance: 20,000
Referee: Fritz Köpcke (East Germany)

30 November 1966

BSG Chemie Leipzig (East Germany)	2–1	(Belgium) Standard Liège
Behla 4'; Schmidt 23'		Galić 43'

Zentralstadion, Leipzig
Referee: Gyula Gere (Hungary)

9 November 1966

Servette (Switzerland)	2–0	(Netherlands) Sparta Rotterdam
Schindelholz 5', 62'

Charmilles Stadium, Geneva
Referee: Francesco Francescon (Italy)

23 November 1966

Strasbourg (France)	1–0	(Bulgaria) Slavia Sofia
Hausser 38'

Stade de la Meinau, Strasbourg
Referee: Bobby Davidson (Scotland)

23 November 1966

Rangers (Scotland)	2–1	(West Germany) Borussia Dortmund
Johansen 12'; A. Smith 75'		Trimhold 31'

Ibrox Stadium, Glasgow
Referee: Daniel Zariquiegui Izco (Spain)

9 November 1966

Zaragoza (Spain)	2–0	(England) Everton
Santos 13'; Marcelino 63'

La Romareda, Zaragoza
Referee: Dittmar Huber (Switzerland)

=== Second leg ===
8 December 1966

Rapid Wien (Austria)	1–0	(Soviet Union) Spartak Moscow
Starek 48'

Praterstadion, Vienna
Referee: Michel Kitabdjian (France)

Rapid Wien won 2–1 on aggregate.

23 November 1966

Bayern Munich (West Germany)	3–2	(Republic of Ireland) Shamrock Rovers
Brenninger 5'; Ohlhauser 8'; Müller 86'		Gilbert 55'; Tuohy 58'

Grünwalder Stadion, Munich
Referee: Konstantin Zečević (Yugoslavia)

Bayern Munich won 4–3 on aggregate.

8 December 1966

Braga (Portugal)	2–0	(Hungary) Vasas ETO Győr
Perrichon 42'; Craveiro 83'

Estádio 28 de Maio, Braga
Attendance: 15,565
Referee: Vital Loraux (Belgium)

Vasas ETO Győr won 3–2 on aggregate.

14 December 1966

Standard Liège (Belgium)	1–0	(East Germany) BSG Chemie Leipzig
Claessen 57'

Stade Maurice Dufrasne, Liège
Referee: John Adair (Northern Ireland)

2-2 on aggregate. Standard Liège won on away goals.

16 November 1966

Sparta Rotterdam (Netherlands)	1–0	(Switzerland) Servette
Laseroms 19'

De Kuip, Rotterdam
Referee: Norman Burtenshaw (England)

Servette won 2–1 on aggregate.

30 November 1966

Slavia Sofia (Bulgaria)	2–0	(France) Strasbourg
Vragev 42'; Mishev 49'

Vasil Levski National Stadium, Sofia
Referee: Taki Wlachojanis (Austria)

Slavia Sofia won 2–1 on aggregate.

6 December 1966

Borussia Dortmund (West Germany)	0–0	(Scotland) Rangers

Stadion Rote Erde, Dortmund
Referee: Dimitar Rumenchev (Bulgaria)

Rangers won 2–1 on aggregate.

23 November 1966

Everton (England)	1–0	(Spain) Zaragoza
Brown 80'

Goodison Park, Liverpool
Referee: Hans-Joachim Weyland (West Germany)

Zaragoza won 2–1 on aggregate.

== Quarter-finals ==
Team 1	Agg.	Team 2	1st leg	2nd leg
Rapid Wien (Austria)	1–2 (aet)	(West Germany) Bayern Munich	1–0	0–2
Vasas ETO Győr (Hungary)	2–3	(Belgium) Standard Liège	2–1	0–2
Servette (Switzerland)	1–3	(Bulgaria) Slavia Sofia	1–0	0–3
Rangers (Scotland)	2–2 (c)	(Spain) Zaragoza	2–0	0–2

=== First leg ===
15 February 1967

Rapid Wien (Austria)	1–0	(West Germany) Bayern Munich
Starek 48'

Praterstadion, Vienna
Referee: Joseph Hannet (Belgium)

1 March 1967

Vasas ETO Győr (Hungary)	2–1	(Belgium) Standard Liège
Stolcz 34'; Szaló 44'		Semmeling 85'

Vagogyári ETO pálya, Győr
Referee: George McCabe (England)

26 February 1967

Servette (Switzerland)	1–0	(Bulgaria) Slavia Sofia
Desbiolles 57'

Charmilles Stadium, Geneva
Referee: Jozef Krňávek (Czechoslovakia)

1 March 1967

Rangers (Scotland)	2–0	(Spain) Zaragoza
D. Smith 9'; Willoughby 27'

Ibrox Stadium, Glasgow
Referee: Laurens van Ravens (Netherlands)

=== Second leg ===
8 March 1967

Bayern Munich (West Germany)	2–0 (a.e.t.)	(Austria) Rapid Wien
Ohlhauser 59'; Müller 106'

Grünwalder Stadion, Munich
Referee: Tom Wharton (Scotland)

Bayern Munich won 2–1 on aggregate.

8 March 1967

Standard Liège (Belgium)	2–0	(Hungary) Vasas ETO Győr
Claessen 55'; Jurkiewicz 58'

Stade Maurice Dufrasne, Liège
Referee: Daniel Zariquiegui Izco (Spain)

Standard Liège won 3–2 on aggregate.

8 March 1967

Slavia Sofia (Bulgaria)	3–0	(Switzerland) Servette
Mishev 43'; Haralampiev 53'; Piguet 86' (o.g.)

Vasil Levski National Stadium, Sofia
Referee: Alessandro D'Agostini (Italy)

Slavia Sofia won 3–1 on aggregate.

22 March 1967

Zaragoza (Spain)	2-0 (a.e.t.)	(Scotland) Rangers
Lapetra 24'; Santos 86' (pen.)

La Romareda, Zaragoza
Referee: Michel Kitabdjian (France)

2–2 on aggregate. Rangers qualified on a coin toss.

== Semi-finals ==
Team 1	Agg.	Team 2	1st leg	2nd leg
Bayern Munich (West Germany)	5–1	(Belgium) Standard Liège	2–0	3–1
Slavia Sofia (Bulgaria)	0–2	(Scotland) Rangers	0–1	0–1

=== First leg ===
7 April 1967

Bayern Munich (West Germany)	2–0	(Belgium) Standard Liège
Müller 2'; Kupferschmidt 10'	Report Report 2

Grünwalder Stadion, Munich
Referee: István Zsolt (Hungary)

19 April 1967

Slavia Sofia (Bulgaria)	0–1	(Scotland) Rangers
	Report Report 2	Wilson 36'

Vasil Levski National Stadium, Sofia
Referee: Tofik Bakhramov (Soviet Union)

=== Second leg ===
26 April 1967

Standard Liège (Belgium)	1–3	(West Germany) Bayern Munich
Galić 32'	Report Report 2	Müller 26', 73', 82'

Stade Maurice Dufrasne, Liège
Referee: Bertil Lööw (Sweden)

Bayern Munich won 5–1 on aggregate.

3 May 1967

Rangers (Scotland)	1–0	(Bulgaria) Slavia Sofia
Henderson 30'	Report Report 2

Ibrox Stadium, Glasgow
Referee: Pierre Schwinte (France)

Rangers won 2–0 on aggregate.

== Final ==
31 May 1967
19:30

Bayern Munich (West Germany)	1–0 (a.e.t.)	(Scotland) Rangers
Roth 109'	Evening Times Report

Städtisches Stadion, Nuremberg
Attendance: 69,480
Referee: Concetto Lo Bello (Italy)

== Top scorers ==
The top scorers from the 1966–67 European Cup Winners' Cup are as follows:

Rank	Name	Team	Goals
1	(Belgium) Roger Claessen	(Belgium) Standard Liège	10
2	(West Germany) Gerd Müller	(West Germany) Bayern Munich	8
3	(East Germany) Bernd Bauchspieß	(East Germany) BSG Chemie Leipzig	4
3	(Denmark) Johnny Bjerregaard	(Austria) Rapid Wien	4
3	(Belgium) Nicolas Dewalque	(Belgium) Standard Liège	4
3	(Republic of Ireland) Billy Dixon	(Republic of Ireland) Shamrock Rovers	4
3	(Austria) Walter Seitl	(Austria) Rapid Wien	4
3	(Bulgaria) Luben Tasev	(Bulgaria) Slavia Sofia	4

== See also ==
- 1966–67 European Cup
- 1966–67 Inter-Cities Fairs Cup
