= Jody Tolan =

Northern Irish footballer

Personal information
- Full name: Jody Tolan
- Date of birth: 5 October 1977 (age 49)
- Place of birth: Belfast, Northern Ireland
- Position: Striker

Senior career*
Years	Team	Apps	(Gls)
1996–2000	Cliftonville	82	(13)
2000–2005	Coleraine	89	(32)
2005–2007	Glentoran	12	(2)
2006	→ Donegal Celtic (loan)	9	(0)
2007–2010	Coleraine	23	(1)
- * Club domestic league appearances and goals

Jody Tolan (born 5 October 1977) is a Northern Irish former semi-professional footballer.

== Playing career ==
=== Cliftonville ===
Tolan began playing for Cliftonville in the middle of the 1990s, making his Irish League debut against Coleraine in November 1996. Under manager Marty Quinn, Tolan was a member of the Cliftonville team to which Quinn brought success. They won the County Antrim Shield, the Coca-Cola Cup and brought the Irish League to Solitude after they finished ahead of favourites Linfield and took the trophy from their bitter rivals Crusaders. Tolan became one of Cliftonville's top players that season, but subsequently left the club to follow Quinn to Coleraine .

=== Coleraine ===
Tolan was reunited with former Quinn and a few other players from The Reds. Tolan enjoyed further success at Coleraine under Quinn, just as he had at Cliftonville. In 2003, Tolan scored the winning goal in the Irish Cup final against favourites Glentoran. He also won a number of other trophies under Quinn. He left the club in 2005 to join Glentoran.

=== Later career ===
Tolan only made a handful of appearances for Glentoran due to several injuries. He returned for a few games for manager Roy Coyle before agreeing to a loan deal with newly promoted side Donegal Celtic. He initially announced his retirement in October 2006 . He managed only nine appearances for DC before returning to Coleraine in 2007. Tolan retired from football in 2010 and is now living in Coleraine with wife Lisa.
