= Michael Halliday (footballer, born 1979) =

Northern Irish footballer

Personal information
- Date of birth: 28 May 1979 (age 47)
- Place of birth: Belfast, Northern Ireland
- Positions: Striker; attacking midfielder

Senior career*
Years	Team	Apps	(Gls)
1999–2010	Glentoran	296	(141)
2010–2012	Crusaders	74	(25)
2012–2013	Lisburn Distillery	33	(2)
2013–2014	Dundela		
2015–2018	Knockbreda		
2018–2026	Bangor		
- * Club domestic league appearances and goals as of 09 February 2024

Michael Halliday (born 28 May 1979) is a former footballer from Northern Ireland. Halliday was known for his immense longevity in the game, only retiring in 2026.

Halliday is from East Belfast and started his career at Glentoran, a club he has supported lifelong, where he played for 11 years and won numerous trophies. Due to his loyalty to the club, he was offered a testimonial in 2009.

On 15 May 2010, Halliday signed a 3-year contract with North Belfast club Crusaders. He arrived on a free transfer after being released by Glentoran's new manager, Scott Young, at the end of the 2009/2010 season.

Halliday had a perfect start to this Crues career, scoring on his league debut against Donegal Celtic, and on 2 October 2010, he scored the winning goal against his former side Glentoran, closing the gap on the leaders. He also scored in the Irish Cup semi final against Portadown, putting the Crues into their second final in three years.

Halliday and Crusaders teammate Ryan McCann joined Lisburn Distillery, in the summer of 2012.

In the summer of 2018, Halliday joined Bangor, helping the team return to the Irish League by scoring 28 goals for the Seasiders in the 2018/19 season. He had a brief spell as caretaker manager alongside Michael Dougherty at Bangor in the COVID-hit Spring of 2020, but continued his playing career at the club. In October 2022, at 43, Michael came off the bench to score both goals for Bangor in a 2-1 extra-time win over Albert Foundry in the Intermediate Cup, becoming the oldest player to have played for Bangor.

== Honours ==
Glentoran

- IFA Premiership: 2002–03, 2004–05, 2008–09
- Irish Cup: 2000–01, 2003–04
- Irish League Cup: 2000–01, 2002–03, 2004–05, 2006–07, 2009–10
- County Antrim Shield: 2000–01, 2001–02, 2002–03, 2007–08
- Gold Cup: 2000–01

Crusaders

- Irish League Cup: 2011–12
- Setanta Cup: 2012

Bangor

- McReynolds Cup: 2018–19
- Ballymena & Provincial Intermediate League: 2018–19
- NIFL Premier Intermediate League: 2022–23
