= Paul Leeman =

Northern Irish footballer and coach

Personal information
- Date of birth: 21 January 1978 (age 48)
- Place of birth: Belfast, Northern Ireland
- Positions: Defender; midfielder

Team information
- Current team: Crusaders (coach)

Senior career*
Years	Team	Apps	(Gls)
1993–2011	Glentoran	597	(45)
2011–2015	Crusaders	110	(2)
Total		707	(47)

Managerial career
- 2018–2019: Glentoran (assistant)
- * Club domestic league appearances and goals

Paul Leeman (born 21 January 1978) is a Northern Irish football coach and former footballer. He is Head Coach of Dundela Under-18's team.

He notably played for Glentoran for 15 years and captained the side to Irish League and cup titles, playing 597 times for the team, before being released in 2011. He moved to Crusaders in 2011, where he spent 4 years, winning another league title, Setanta Cup and Irish League Cup. He began coaching at Glentoran in 2018, becoming assistant manager in January 2019, before returning to his coaching role when Mick McDermott arrived at the club. Leeman left Glentoran in the summer of 2019.

== Playing career ==
=== Glentoran ===
After playing for Dungoyne Boys, Leeman joined Glentoran as a schoolboy in 1993. Two years later he made his first-team debut. Initially playing in midfield and at right back, he switched to centre-back. He was named as the Ulster Footballer of the Year for the 2004/05 season. Leeman missed almost all of the 2005–06 season.

He brought his children out with him to lift the Irish Premier League trophy after Glentoran had beaten Cliftonville to see off the challenge of Linfield who had beaten Crusaders 5–0 at Seaview. He had his testimonial against Roy Keane's Ipswich Town, a 3–1 defeat. He was the fourth generation of his family to play for Glentoran.

=== Crusaders ===
Leeman joined fellow Belfast side Crusaders in June 2011, linking up with former Glens team-mate Michael Halliday. He scored his first Crusaders goal in a 5-1 league victory over Carrick Rangers on 29 October 2011.

== Coaching career ==
Leeman returned to Glentoran as a coach on 24 May 2018 alongside former team-mate Gary Smyth. He became assistant manager on 3 January 2019, in a role he held until 31 March 2019. Following the sale of Glentoran, Leeman left the team in controversial circumstances on 23 May 2019, two days after Smyth.

He returned to Crusaders in July 2019, filling the post of first team coach vacated by the long-serving Charlie Murphy.

== Honours ==
Glentoran

- Irish Premier League (4): 1998-99, 2002-03, 2004-05, 2008-09
- Irish Cup (4): 1997–98, 1999–2000, 2000–01, 2003–04
- Gold Cup (3): 1997–98, 1998–99, 1999–2000
- Irish League Cup (5): 2000–01, 2002–03, 2004–05, 2006–07, 2009–10
- County Antrim Shield (6): 1997–98, 1998–99, 1999–2000, 2001–02, 2002–03, 2007–08

Crusaders

- NIFL Premiership (1): 2014–15
- Irish League Cup (1): 2011–12
- Setanta Cup (1): 2012
