= David Larmour =

David Larmour may refer to:

- Davy Larmour (boxer) (born 1952), Northern Irish boxer
- Davy Larmour (footballer) (born 1977), Northern Irish footballer
- David H. J. Larmour, Paul Whitfield Horn Professor and Head of Classics at Texas Tech University
