= 2014–15 KAA Gent season =

K.A.A. Gent
2014–15 season
- Chairman: Ivan De Witte
- Manager: Hein Vanhaezebrouck
- Stadium: Ghelamco Arena
- Belgian Pro League: 1st
- Belgian Cup: Semi-final

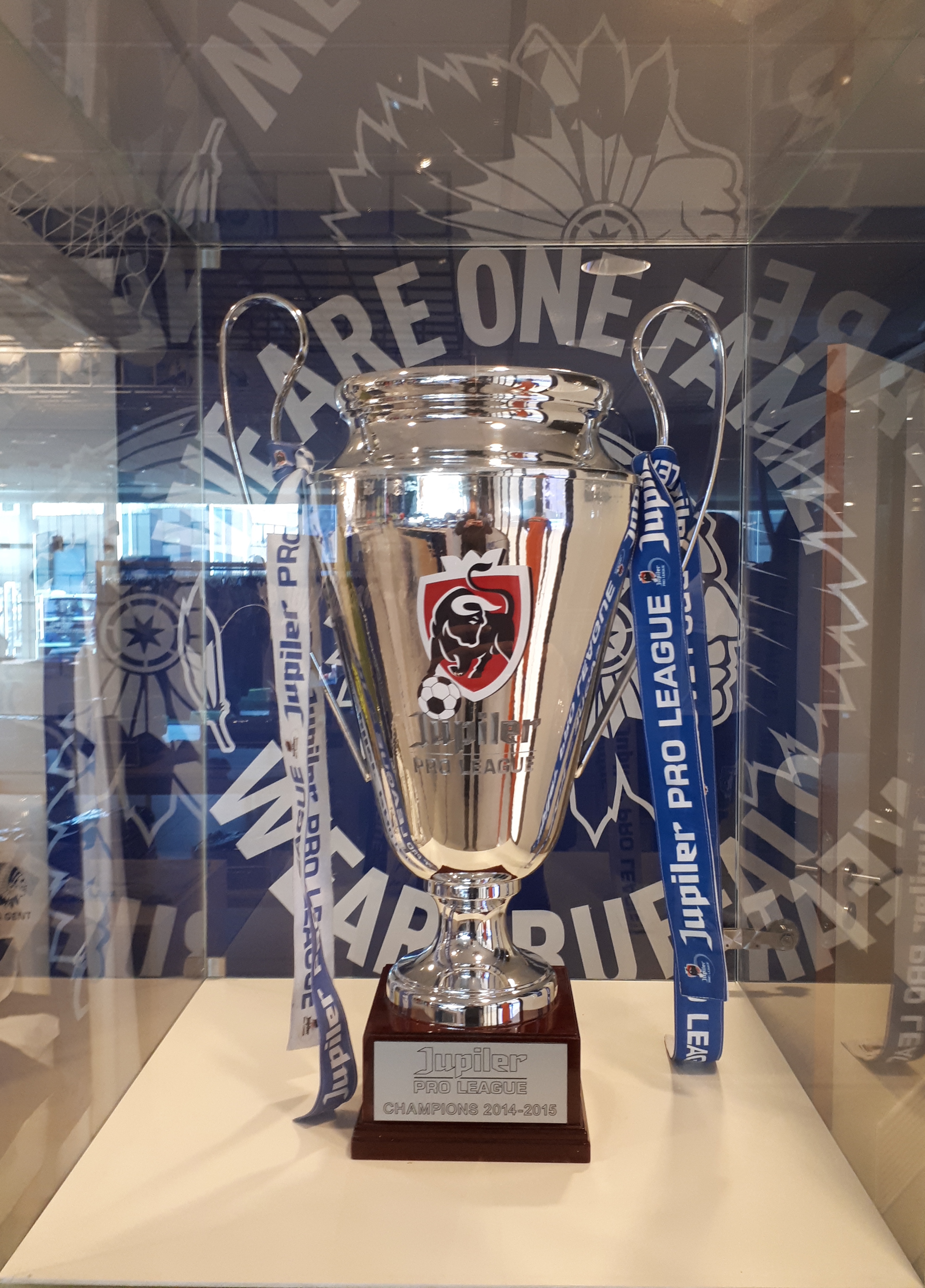
Juliper Pro trophy won by K.A.A. Gent in 2015

The 2014–15 season was K.A.A. Gent's 112th season in existence and 26th consecutive season in the top flight of Belgian football, the Belgian Pro League. The club also competed in the Belgian Cup

== Match details ==
League positions are sourced by Statto, while the remaining information is referenced individually.

=== Belgian Pro League ===
==== Regular season ====
Pos	Team	Pld	W	D	L	GF	GA	GD	Pts	Qualification or relegation
1	Club Brugge	30	17	10	3	69	28	+41	61	Qualification for the Championship play-offs
2	Gent	30	16	9	5	52	29	+23	57	Qualification for the Championship play-offs
3	Anderlecht	30	16	9	5	51	30	+21	57	Qualification for the Championship play-offs
4	Standard Liège	30	16	5	9	49	39	+10	53	Qualification for the Championship play-offs
5	Kortrijk	30	16	3	11	54	35	+19	51	Qualification for the Championship play-offs

Source: Belgian Pro League
Rules for classification: 1) points; 2) number of matches won; if teams are still tied a play-off is organised.

Date	League position	Opponents	Venue	Result	Score F–A	Scorers	Attendance	Ref.
26 July 2014	5th	Cercle Brugge	A	D	0–0		7,465	
3 August 2014	5th	Mechelen	H	W	3–1	Depoitre 49', 85', Raman 61',	16,979	
10 August 2014	2nd	Standard Liège	A	W	1–0	Depoitre 16'	23,749	
17 August 2014	2nd	Zulte-Waregem	H	W	3–1	Habibou 69', Milićević 72', 84' pen.	17,966	
22 August 2014	2nd	Genk	A	L	2–3	Dejaegere 31', Milićević 34'	16,580	
29 August 2014	2nd	Kortrijk	H	L	0–1		16,842	
14 September 2014	2nd	Mouscron-Péruwelz	H	W	1–0	Saief 82'	16,855	
20 September 2014	2nd	Oostende	A	W	3–1	Pollet 14', Depoitre 84', 90'	5,733	
28 September 2014	2nd	Lokeren	H	D	1–1	Depoitre 90'	18,902	
3 October 2014	2nd	Westerlo	A	D	0–0		8,000	
18 October 2014	2nd	Charleroi	H	D	2–2	Foket 44', Raman 80'	16,606	
26 October 2014	3rd	Club Brugge	A	D	2–2	Milićević 13', Rafinha 63'	26,500	
29 October 2014	2nd	Waasland-Beveren	H	W	4–1	Milićević 16' pen., Depoitre 59', Raman 67', 84'	17,585	
2 November 2014	2nd	Lierse	A	W	1–0	Van der Bruggen 74'	6,550	
9 November 2014	4th	Anderlecht	H	L	0–2		19,999	
22 November 2014	3rd	Cercle Brugge	H	W	4–0	Dejaegere 14', Raman 60', Depoitre 71', Pollet 82'	18,346	
28 November 2014	3rd	Zulte-Waregem	A	L	1–2	Gershon 17'	11,213	
7 December 2014	4th	Genk	H	D	0–0		17,407	
12 December 2014	3rd	Mechelen	A	D	0–0		9,070	
21 December 2014	6th	Standard Liege	H	L	1–2	Dejaegere 16'	19,458	
26 December 2014	5th	Kortrijk	A	W	3–2	Nielsen 13', Raman 61', Depoitre 82'	9,374	
17 January 2015	4th	Mouscron-Péruwelz	A	W	3–1	Neto 15', Depoitre 29', Dejaegere 56'	3,000	
25 January 2015	3rd	Oostende	H	W	3–1	Neto 11', 82' Saief 25'	17,290	
1 February 2015	4th	Lokeren	A	D	3–3	Simon 6', 16', 72'	8,900	
7 February 2015	2nd	Westerlo	H	W	4–0	Depoitre 38', 90', Simon 61', Milićević 77'	18,248	
15 February 2015	3rd	Charleroi	A	D	0–0		8,364	
22 February 2015	3rd	Club Brugge	H	W	2–1	Simon 23', Simons 72' o.g.	19,999	
1 March 2015	3rd	Waasland-Beveren	A	W	1–0	Simon 66'	6,308	
7 March 2015	3rd	Lierse	H	W	2–1	Neto 32' pen., Pedersen 90'	19,470	
15 March 2015	2nd	Anderlecht	A	W	2–1	Foket 49, Raman 61'	21,000	

==== Championship play-offs ====
Pos	Team	Pld	W	D	L	GF	GA	GD	Pts	Qualification
1	Gent (C)	10	6	2	2	18	11	+7	49	Qualification for the Champions League group stage
2	Club Brugge	10	5	1	4	16	16	0	47	Qualification for the Champions League third qualifying round
3	Anderlecht	10	5	2	3	18	13	+5	46	Qualification for the Europa League group stage (Note: Since winners of the 2014–15 Belgian Cup, Club Brugge, qualified for the Champions League based on league position, the spot awarded to the Cup winner (Europa League group stage) was passed to the third-placed team and the other spots were adjusted accordingly.)
4	Standard Liège	10	4	1	5	14	13	+1	40	Qualification for the Europa League third qualifying round
5	Charleroi	10	3	2	5	13	15	−2	36	Qualification for the Testmatches to Europa League (Note: The team finishing in fifth place, Charleroi, will play the testmatches against the winner of the Belgian Europa League playoff final, for a spot in the Europa League second qualifying round.)
6	Kortrijk	10	2	2	6	11	22	−11	34	

Source: soccerway.com
Rules for classification: 1) points; 2) points after deduction of (possible) half points added due to rounding; 3) number of wins; 4) goal difference; 5) number of goals scored; 6) number of away goals scored; 7) number of away wins.
(C) Champions
Notes:

Date	League position	Opponents	Venue	Result	Score F–A	Scorers	Attendance	Ref.
5 April 2015	1st	Kortrijk	H	W	2–0	Milićević 33', Simon 73'	18,412	
11 April 2015	2nd	Charleroi	A	L	1–2	Poletanović 83'	10,106	
17 April 2015	1st	Standard Liege	A	W	3–1	Pedersen 23', 52', Tabekou 90'	24,050	
26 April 2015	2nd	Club Brugge	H	D	2–2	Milićević 13', 43'	19,999	
30 April 2015	2nd	Anderlecht	H	W	2–1	Depoitre 50', Neto 90'	19,999	
3 May 2015	1st	Kortrijk	A	W	1–0	Chanot 65' o.g.	9,078	
8 May 2015	1st	Charleroi	H	D	1–1	Neto 26'	19,822	
17 May 2015	1st	Club Brugge	A	W	3–2	Nielsen 5', Dejaegere 52', Raman 87'	27,000	
21 May 2015	1st	Standard Liege	H	W	2–0	Kums 18', Neto 50' pen.	19,999	
24 May 2015	1st	Anderlecht	A	L	1–2	Pedersen 3'	21,000	

=== Belgian Cup ===
Round	Date	Opponents	Venue	Result	Score F–A	Scorers	Attendance	Ref.
Sixth round	24 September 2014	UR Namur	A	W	3–1	Lepoint 33', 35', 90'	2,000	
Seventh round	3 December 2014	Lommel United	A	W	1–0	Lepoint 62'	2,500	
Quarter-final first leg	17 December 2014	Lokeren	A	W	4–1	Depoitre 4', Milićević 50', Saief 69', Raman 87'	5,422	
Quarter-final second leg	21 January 2015	Lokeren	H	W	1–0	Dejaegere 62'	6,975	
Semi-final first leg	4 February 2015	Anderlecht	H	L	0–2		14,473	
Semi-final second leg	12 February 2015	Anderlecht	A	L	0–3		9,113	

== Transfers ==
=== Transfers in ===
Date	Position	Name	From	Fee	Ref.
30 June 2014	FW	David Pollet	Anderlecht	€1,500,000	
1 July 2014	FW	Laurent Depoitre	Oostende	Free	
1 July 2014	GK	Brian Vandenbussche	sc Heerenveen	Free	

=== Loans in ===
Date	Position	Name	To	Date until	Ref.
1 September 2014	DF	Lasse Nielsen	NEC Nijmegen	30 June 2015	
1 September 2014	DF	Ygor Nogueira	Fluminese	30 June 2015	

=== Transfers out ===
Date	Position	Name	To	Fee	Ref.
1 September 2015	FW	Habib Habibou	Rennes	Undisclosed	
29 January 2015	MF	Christophe Lepoint	Charlton Athletic	Undisclosed	

=== Loans out ===
Date	Position	Name	To	Date until	Ref.
17 June 2014	FW	Sloan Privat	SM Caen	30 June 2015	
20 June 2014	DF	Ervin Zukanović	Chievo	30 June 2015	
14 July 2014	DF	Wouter Corstjens	Waasland-Beveren	30 June 2015	
14 July 2014	MF	David Hubert	Waasland-Beveren	30 June 2015	
5 August 2014	MF	Jari Vandeputte	Roeselare	30 June 2015	
5 August 2014	MF	Rik Impens	Roeselare	30 June 2015	
