= 2000–01 Gold Cup =

Tournament details
- Country: Northern Ireland
- Teams: 20

Final positions
- Champions: Glentoran (14th win)
- Runners-up: Coleraine

Tournament statistics
- Matches played: 21
- Goals scored: 85 (4.05 per match)

The 2000–01 Gold Cup was the 82nd and final edition of the Gold Cup, a cup competition in Northern Irish football.

The tournament was won by Glentoran for the 14th time and 3rd consecutive season, defeating Coleraine 4–2 in the final at Windsor Park.

== Results ==
=== Preliminary round ===
Team 1	Score	Team 2
Armagh City	3–1	Limavady United
Dungannon Swifts	2–1	Ards
Institute	5–4 (a.e.t.)	Bangor
Lisburn Distillery	2–0	Larne

=== First round ===
Team 1	Score	Team 2
Cliftonville	0–1	Glentoran
Coleraine	4–3 (a.e.t.)	Lisburn Distillery
Dungannon Swifts	2–1	Ballymena United
Glenavon	2–0	Ballyclare Comrades
Linfield	1–0	Carrick Rangers
Newry Town	5–3 (a.e.t.)	Armagh City
Omagh Town	3–0	Institute
Portadown	1–0	Crusaders

=== Quarter-finals ===
Team 1	Score	Team 2
Dungannon Swifts	1–2	Coleraine
Glentoran	2–1	Portadown
Linfield	4–3 (a.e.t.)	Glenavon
Newry Town	3–2 (a.e.t.)	Omagh Town

=== Semi-finals ===
Teams on the left were at home in the first leg.

Team 1	Agg.	Team 2	1st leg	2nd leg
Glentoran	3–2	Newry Town	0–1	3–1
Linfield	4–6	Coleraine	1–3	3–3

== Final ==
12 December 2000

Glentoran	4–3	Coleraine
Ferguson 7'; Lockhart 52'; Smyth 76'; McCann 82'		Devine 40' (pen.); Loughery 60'; Tolan 86'; McLaughlin (red card) 70'

Windsor Park, Belfast
Referee: Leslie Irvine (Limavady)
