= 1999–2000 Gold Cup =

Tournament details
- Country: Northern Ireland
- Teams: 20

Final positions
- Champions: Glentoran (13th win)
- Runners-up: Linfield

Tournament statistics
- Matches played: 21
- Goals scored: 72 (3.43 per match)

The 1999–2000 Gold Cup was the 81st edition of the Gold Cup, a cup competition in Northern Irish football.

The tournament was won by Glentoran for the 13th time and 2nd consecutive season, defeating Linfield 4–2 in the final at Windsor Park.

== Results ==
=== Preliminary round ===
| Team 1 | Score | Team 2 |
|---|---|---|
| Armagh City | 2–2 (a.e.t.) (4–5 p) | Carrick Rangers |
| Bangor | 1–2 | Ards |
| Larne | 1–2 | Dungannon Swifts |
| Limavady United | 1–1 (a.e.t.) (3–2 p) | Omagh Town |

=== First round ===
| Team 1 | Score | Team 2 |
|---|---|---|
| Ards | 1–2 | Glentoran |
| Ballymena United | 3–2 | Crusaders |
| Carrick Rangers | 1–3 | Glenavon |
| Cliftonville | 3–1 | Portadown |
| Coleraine | 2–3 | Limavady United |
| Institute | 3–1 | Ballyclare Comrades |
| Linfield | 3–1 | Dungannon Swifts |
| Newry Town | 1–0 | Lisburn Distillery |

=== Quarter-finals ===
| Team 1 | Score | Team 2 |
|---|---|---|
| Glenavon | 1–2 | Glentoran |
| Institute | 2–0 | Newry Town |
| Limavady United | 2–4 | Cliftonville |
| Linfield | 3–1 | Ballymena United |

=== Semi-finals ===
Teams on the left were at home in the first leg.

| Team 1 | Agg. | Team 2 | 1st leg | 2nd leg |
|---|---|---|---|---|
| Glentoran | 2–2 | Cliftonville | 0–0 | 2–2 (a.e.t.) (4–3 p) |
| Linfield | 5–0 | Institute | 4–0 | 1–0 |

== Final ==
30 November 1999

| Linfield | 2–4 | Glentoran |
|---|---|---|
| Larmour 73'; Bailie 89' | | Russell 5', 18'; Young 35'; McCombe 54' |

Windsor Park, Belfast
Attendance: 6,500
Referee: Alan Snoddy (Carryduff)
