= 1972–73 Irish Cup =

Tournament details
- Country: Northern Ireland
- Teams: 16

Final positions
- Champions: Glentoran (9th win)
- Runners-up: Linfield

Tournament statistics
- Matches played: 19
- Goals scored: 58 (3.05 per match)

The 1972–73 Irish Cup was the 93rd edition of the Irish Cup, the premier knock-out cup competition in Northern Irish football.

Glentoran won the cup for the 9th time, defeating Linfield 3–2 in the final at Windsor Park.

The holders Coleraine were eliminated in the semi-finals by Linfield.

== Results ==
=== First round ===
Team 1	Score	Team 2
Ballymena United	1–1	Glenavon
Carrick Rangers	1–1	Coleraine
Cliftonville	1–1	Bangor
Crusaders	3–1	Ards
Distillery	3–4	Linfield
Larne	2–0	Dundela
Limavady United	1–3	Glentoran
Portadown	5–1	Ballyclare Comrades

==== Replay ====
Team 1	Score	Team 2
Bangor	3–1	Cliftonville
Coleraine	2–0	Carrick Rangers
Glenavon	2–0	Ballymena United

=== Quarter-finals ===
Team 1	Score	Team 2
Coleraine	2–1	Portadown
Crusaders	1–2	Glentoran
Glenavon	3–1	Bangor
Larne	0–0	Linfield

==== Replay ====
Team 1	Score	Team 2
Linfield	2–0	Larne

=== Semi-finals ===
Team 1	Score	Team 2
Glentoran	1–0	Glenavon
Linfield	2–1	Coleraine

=== Final ===
28 April 1973

Glentoran	3–2	Linfield
Feeney 43', 81' (pen.); Jamison 70'	Report	Magee 64', 76'

Windsor Park, Belfast
Attendance: 12,000
Referee: H. Wilson (Belfast)
