= 2000–01 Irish Cup =

Tournament details
- Country: Northern Ireland
- Teams: 84

Final positions
- Champions: Glentoran (19th win)
- Runners-up: Linfield

Tournament statistics
- Matches played: 100
- Goals scored: 360 (3.6 per match)

The 2000–01 Irish Cup was the 121st edition of the Irish Cup, Northern Ireland's premier football knock-out cup competition. It concluded on 5 May 2001 with the final.

Glentoran were the defending champions, winning their 18th Irish Cup last season after a 1–0 win over Portadown in the 2000 final. They successfully defended the trophy by beating arch rivals Linfield 1–0 after extra time. This was their 19th cup win, and their fourth in six years. The 2001 Final was the first time the Final was shown live on Television in Northern Ireland.

== Results ==
=== First round ===
Abbey Villa, Annagh United, Harland & Wolff Sports and Malachians all received byes into the second round.

Team 1	Score	Team 2
Albert Foundry	6–0	Queen's University
Ballycastle United	0–2	Draperstown Celtic
Ballymacash Rangers	4–0	Wellington Recreation
Bangor Amateurs	3–2	Ballynahinch United
Barn United	3–7	Drummond United
Comber Recreation	2–1	Donard Hospital
Glebe Rangers	5–0	Connor
Grove United	2–2	Northern Telecom
Hanover	1–3	Tandragee Rovers
Islandmagee	4–2	Portglenone
Larne Tech Old Boys	2–1	Dungiven Celtic
Laurelvale	1–0	1st Bangor Old Boys
Seapatrick	1–5	Saintfield United
Shorts	3–2	Sirocco Works
U.U.C.	6–1	Lower Maze
Warrenpoint Town	4–2	Downshire Young Men

==== Replay ====
Team 1	Score	Team 2
Northern Telecom	1–2	Grove United

=== Second round ===
Team 1	Score	Team 2
Abbey Villa	3–3	Glebe Rangers
Albert Foundry	3–3	Islandmagee
Annagh United	1–2	Larne Tech Old Boys
Bangor Amateurs	2–3	Tandragee Rovers
Draperstown Celtic	0–2	Warrenpoint Town
Drummond United	1–1	Comber Recreation
Grove United	1–0	Shorts
Harland & Wolff Sports	0–3	Ballymacash Rangers
Malachians	9–0	Laurelvale
Saintfield United	2–1	U.U.C.

==== Replays ====
Team 1	Score	Team 2
Comber Recreation	1–0	Drummond United
Glebe Rangers	3–0	Abbey Villa
Islandmagee	1–2	Albert Foundry

=== Third round ===
Team 1	Score	Team 2
Albert Foundry	2–1	Larne Tech Old Boys
Grove United	2–2	Glebe Rangers
Malachians	4–1	Warrenpoint Town
Saintfield United	1–2	Comber Recreation
Tandragee Rovers	2–2	Ballymacash Rangers

==== Replays ====
Team 1	Score	Team 2
Ballymacash Rangers	w/o	Tandragee Rovers (withdrew)
Glebe Rangers	2–5	Grove United

=== Fourth round ===
Ards Rangers, Ballymoney United, Banbridge Town, Comber Recreation, Drumaness Mills, Malachians and Rathfriland Rangers all received byes into the fifth round.

Team 1	Score	Team 2
Brantwood	2–1	Crewe United
Chimney Corner	1–1	Grove United
Donegal Celtic	1–3	Killyleagh Youth
Dromara Village	1–2	Portstewart
Dundela	1–1	Cookstown United
Dunmurry Rec.	0–3	Ballinamallard United
Harland & Wolff Welders	3–0	East Belfast
Kilmore Recreation	0–4	Coagh United
Knockbreda Parish	3–1	Albert Foundry
Moyola Park	2–1	Ballymacash Rangers
RUC	3–0	FC Enkalon

==== Replays ====
Team 1	Score	Team 2
Cookstown United	2–1	Dundela
Grove United	0–1	Chimney Corner

=== Fifth round ===
Team 1	Score	Team 2
Ards Rangers	2–1	Chimney Corner
Ballinamallard United	2–2	Knockbreda Parish
Ballymoney United	1–2	Malachians
Banbridge Town	1–1	Moyola Park
Brantwood	0–3	Harland & Wolff Welders
Coagh United	0–2	Crumlin United
Drumaness Mills	0–2	Killyleagh Youth
Lurgan Celtic	3–1	Comber Recreation
Portstewart	4–3	Rathfriland Rangers
RUC	4–2	Cookstown United

==== Replays ====
Team 1	Score	Team 2
Knockbreda Parish	5–1	Ballinamallard United
Moyola Park	5–2	Banbridge Town

=== Sixth round ===
Team 1	Score	Team 2
Ards	1–0	RUC
Armagh City	0–3	Glentoran
Ballyclare Comrades	3–1	Harland & Wolff Welders
Ballymena United	4–2	Lurgan Celtic
Carrick Rangers	1–3	Knockbreda Parish
Dungannon Swifts	2–2	Cliftonville
Glenavon	1–1	Killyleagh Youth
Institute	2–2	Portstewart
Limavady United	2–5	Newry Town
Linfield	4–2	Larne
Lisburn Distillery	2–0	Crusaders
Loughgall	2–2	Coleraine
Moyola Park	2–1	Crumlin United
Omagh Town	2–0	Malachians
Portadown	3–1	Ards Rangers
Tobermore United	0–2	Bangor

==== Replays ====
Team 1	Score	Team 2
Cliftonville	4–1	Dungannon Swifts
Coleraine	0–0 (a.e.t.) (0–3 p)	Loughgall
Glenavon	4–0	Killyleagh Youth
Institute	3–1	Portstewart

=== Seventh round ===
Team 1	Score	Team 2
Ballyclare Comrades	2–0	Cliftonville
Ballymena United	1–1	Glenavon
Glentoran	4–0	Moyola Park
Institute	4–1	Knockbreda Parish
Linfield	0–0	Ards
Loughgall	0–1	Bangor
Newry Town	1–1	Portadown
Omagh Town	1–1	Lisburn Distillery

==== Replays ====
Team 1	Score	Team 2
Ards	0–5	Linfield
Glenavon	3–1	Ballymena United
Lisburn Distillery	2–1	Omagh Town
Portadown	2–1	Newry Town

=== Quarter-finals ===
Team 1	Score	Team 2
Glenavon	2–1	Ballyclare Comrades
Glentoran	2–1	Institute
Linfield	1–0	Bangor
Portadown	0–1	Lisburn Distillery

=== Semi-finals ===
Team 1	Score	Team 2
Lisburn Distillery	1–2	Glentoran
Linfield	3–1	Glenavon

=== Final ===
5 May 2001

Linfield	0 – 1 (a.e.t.)	Glentoran
	Report	Halliday 99'

Windsor Park, Belfast
Attendance: 14,190
