= 1987–88 County Antrim Centenary Chalice =

County Antrim Centenary Chalice
Tournament details
- Country: Northern Ireland
- Teams: 16

Final positions
- Champions: Glentoran
- Runners-up: Ballymena United

Tournament statistics
- Matches played: 15
- Goals scored: 44 (2.93 per match)

The 1987–88 County Antrim Centenary Chalice was a one-off cup competition in Northern Irish football held by the County Antrim & District F.A. to celebrate their centenary. The format used was identical to that of the County Antrim Shield.

Glentoran won the tournament defeating Ballymena United 4–2 in the final.

== Results ==
=== First round ===
Team 1	Score	Team 2
Ards	2–0	Ballyclare Comrades
Bangor	2–0	POSC
Cliftonville	5–1	Maghera
Crusaders	0–3	Ballymena United
Distillery	4–2	Newtownabbey Town
Glentoran	2–0 (a.e.t.)	RUC
Larne	1–2	Dundela
Linfield	4–0	Carrick Rangers

=== Quarter-finals ===
Team 1	Score	Team 2
Ards	1–1 (a.e.t.) (4–2 p)	Dundela
Ballymena United	0–0 (a.e.t.) (6–5 p)	Cliftonville
Distillery	2–1	Bangor
Linfield	0–2	Glentoran

=== Semi-finals ===
Team 1	Score	Team 2
Distillery	0–2	Ballymena United
Glentoran	1–0	Ards

=== Final ===
7 May 1988

Glentoran	4–2	Ballymena United
Mullan 8', 24', 45'; Caskey 34'	Report	Pyper 62', 77'

Windsor Park, Belfast
Referee: Alan Snoddy (Carryduff)
