= 1986–87 County Antrim Shield =

Tournament details
- Country: Northern Ireland
- Teams: 16

Final positions
- Champions: Glentoran (19th win)
- Runners-up: Glenavon

Tournament statistics
- Matches played: 15
- Goals scored: 53 (3.53 per match)

The 1986–87 County Antrim Shield was the 98th edition of the County Antrim Shield, a cup competition in Northern Irish football.

Glentoran won the tournament for the 19th time, defeating Glenavon 3–0 in the final. This year the County Antrim FA invited three clubs from County Armagh to compete (Glenavon, Newry Town and Portadown).

== Results ==
=== First round ===
Team 1	Score	Team 2
Ards	2–1	Dundela
Bangor	5–1	Brantwood
Carrick Rangers	0–3	Ballymena United
Crusaders	4–1	Newry Town
Distillery	3–3 (a.e.t.) (6–5 p)	Ballymoney United
Glentoran	1–0	Cliftonville
Linfield	2–0	Larne
Portadown	1–3	Glenavon

=== Quarter-finals ===
Team 1	Score	Team 2
Ballymena United	0–2	Linfield
Bangor	0–6	Glentoran
Crusaders	1–2	Ards
Distillery	1–2	Glenavon

=== Semi-finals ===
Team 1	Score	Team 2
Glenavon	1–0	Linfield
Glentoran	4–1	Ards

=== Final ===
8 October 1986

Glentoran	3–0	Glenavon
Macartney 18'; Millar 37'; Cleary 83'

The Oval, Belfast
Referee: Sidney Spence (Belfast)
