= 1984–85 County Antrim Shield =

Tournament details
- Country: Northern Ireland
- Teams: 14

Final positions
- Champions: Glentoran (18th win)
- Runners-up: Crusaders

Tournament statistics
- Matches played: 14
- Goals scored: 43 (3.07 per match)

The 1984–85 County Antrim Shield was the 96th edition of the County Antrim Shield, a cup competition in Northern Irish football.

Glentoran won the tournament for the 18th time, defeating Crusaders 2–1 in the final.

== Results ==
=== First round ===
Team 1	Score	Team 2
Ballyclare Comrades	3–3	Distillery
Ballymena United	0–2	Ards
Carrick Rangers	0–2	Killyleagh Youth
Cliftonville	3–1	Distillery II
Glentoran	3–1	Bangor
Linfield	3–1	Larne
Crusaders	bye	
Dundela	bye	

==== Replay ====
Team 1	Score	Team 2
Distillery	1–0	Ballyclare Comrades

=== Quarter-finals ===
Team 1	Score	Team 2
Ards	3–2	Killyleagh Youth
Cliftonville	1–2	Distillery
Crusaders	2–1 (a.e.t.)	Dundela
Linfield	0–1	Glentoran

=== Semi-finals ===
Team 1	Score	Team 2
Ards	2–3	Glentoran
Crusaders	0–0 (a.e.t.) (4–3 p)	Distillery

=== Final ===
17 May 1985

Glentoran	2–1	Crusaders
Mills 41'; Stewart 48' (pen.)		McKay 46'

The Oval, Belfast
Referee: Freddie McKnight (Newtownards)
