= Nicolas Dewalque =

Belgian footballer

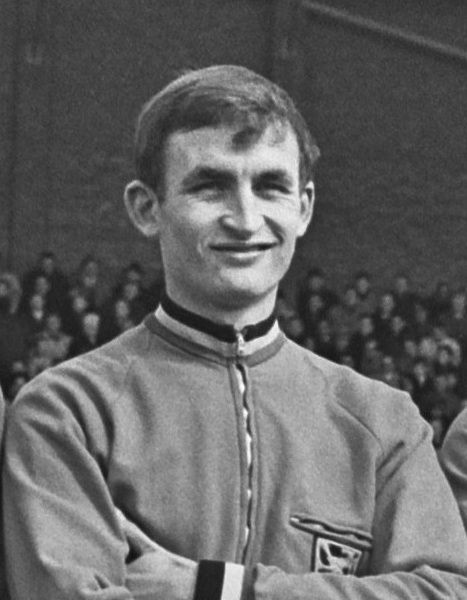
- Dewalque in 1968

Personal information
- Date of birth: 20 September 1945 (age 81)
- Place of birth: Zichen-Zussen-Bolder, Belgium
- Height: 1.83 m (6 ft 0 in)
- Position: Defender

Youth career
- FC Zichen

Senior career*
Years	Team	Apps	(Gls)
1963–1976	Standard Liège	296	(15)
1976–1979	RFC Liège	56	

International career
1967-1973	Belgium	33	(0)
- * Club domestic league appearances and goals

Nicolas "Nico" Dewalque (born 20 September 1945) is a Belgian retired footballer who played as a defender for Standard Liège and RFC Liège.

He earned 33 caps for the Belgium national team, and participated in the 1970 FIFA World Cup.

== Post-playing career ==
After retiring as a player, Dewalque worked as an entrepreneur in different branches. He was convicted of tax evasion in 2006 while working in construction. In 2020, he was accused of having supplied illegal workers to large construction companies.
