= 2001–02 County Antrim Shield =

Tournament details
- Country: Northern Ireland
- Teams: 16

Final positions
- Champions: Glentoran (23rd win)
- Runners-up: Linfield

Tournament statistics
- Matches played: 15
- Goals scored: 48 (3.2 per match)

The 2001–02 County Antrim Shield was the 113th edition of the County Antrim Shield, a cup competition in Northern Irish football.

Glentoran won the tournament for the 23rd time, defeating Linfield 2–0 in the final.

== Results ==
=== First round ===
| Team 1 | Score | Team 2 |
|---|---|---|
| Ballymena United | 3–1 | Donard Hospital |
| Bangor | 2–3 | East Belfast |
| Carrick Rangers | 0–1 | Ards |
| Cliftonville | 3–0 | Ballyclare Comrades |
| Crusaders | 5–1 | Ards Rangers |
| Larne | 0–4 | Glentoran |
| Linfield | 2–1 | Harland & Wolff Welders |
| Lisburn Distillery | 2–2 (a.e.t.) (5–6 p) | Dundela |

=== Quarter-finals ===
| Team 1 | Score | Team 2 |
|---|---|---|
| Ballymena United | 2–1 | Ards |
| Cliftonville | 2–0 | Crusaders |
| Glentoran | 3–1 | East Belfast |
| Linfield | 2–0 | Dundela |

=== Semi-finals ===
| Team 1 | Score | Team 2 |
|---|---|---|
| Glentoran | 1–0 | Cliftonville |
| Linfield | 4–0 | Ballymena United |

=== Final ===
26 February 2002

| Glentoran | 2–0 | Linfield |
|---|---|---|
| Batey 48'; Armour 71' |

The Oval, Belfast
Attendance: 6,000
Referee: Alan Snoddy (Carryduff)
