= Helmut Schmidt (disambiguation) =

Helmut Schmidt (1918–2015) was a German Social Democratic politician.

Helmut Schmidt may also refer to:

- Helmut Schmidt (parapsychologist) (1928–2011), German-born physicist and parapsychologist
- Helmut Schmidt (footballer) (born 1949), German football player

== See also ==
- Helmuth Schmidt
