= 2002–03 County Antrim Shield =

Tournament details
- Country: Northern Ireland
- Teams: 16

Final positions
- Champions: Glentoran (24th win)
- Runners-up: Ballymena United

Tournament statistics
- Matches played: 15
- Goals scored: 60 (4 per match)

The 2002–03 County Antrim Shield was the 114th edition of the County Antrim Shield, a cup competition in Northern Irish football.

Glentoran won the tournament for the 24th time and 2nd consecutive season, defeating Ballymena United 3–0 in the final.

== Results ==
=== First round ===
| Team 1 | Score | Team 2 |
|---|---|---|
| Ballyclare Comrades | 8–1 | Connor |
| Ballymena United | 8–0 | Ballymoney United |
| Bangor | 2–0 | Killyleagh Youth |
| Carrick Rangers | 4–1 | Cliftonville |
| Crusaders | 1–1 (a.e.t.) (6–7 p) | Chimney Corner |
| Glentoran | 9–0 | Barn United |
| Linfield | 2–0 | Ards |
| Lisburn Distillery | 3–0 | Larne |

=== Quarter-finals ===
| Team 1 | Score | Team 2 |
|---|---|---|
| Ballyclare Comrades | 0–5 | Glentoran |
| Carrick Rangers | 0–1 | Chimney Corner |
| Linfield | 2–1 (a.e.t.) | Bangor |
| Lisburn Distillery | 1–2 | Ballymena United |

=== Semi-finals ===
| Team 1 | Score | Team 2 |
|---|---|---|
| Ballymena United] | 3–1 | Chimney Corner |
| Linfield | 0–1 (a.e.t.) | Glentoran |

=== Final ===
4 March 2003

| Glentoran | 3–0 | Ballymena United |
|---|---|---|
| Armour 42'; Smith 58'; Young 71' |

The Oval, Belfast
Referee: Alan Snoddy (Carryduff)
