= 2007–08 County Antrim Shield =

Tournament details
- Country: Northern Ireland
- Teams: 16

Final positions
- Champions: Glentoran (25th win)
- Runners-up: Crusaders

Tournament statistics
- Matches played: 15
- Goals scored: 45 (3 per match)

The 2007–08 County Antrim Shield was the 119th edition of the County Antrim Shield, a cup competition in Northern Irish football.

Glentoran won the tournament for the 25th time, defeating Crusaders 2–1 in the final.

== Results ==
=== First round ===
Team 1	Score	Team 2
Ballymena United	8–0	Orangefield Old Boys
Cliftonville	1–0	Newington Youth
Crusaders	2–0	Brantwood
Donegal Celtic	2–0	Glebe Rangers
Glentoran	2–0	Comber Recreation
Larne	3–0	Ards
Linfield	4–0	Harland & Wolff Welders
Lisburn Distillery	4–0	East Belfast

=== Quarter-finals ===
Team 1	Score	Team 2
Ballymena United	2–0	Donegal Celtic
Crusaders	3–0	Larne
Glentoran	3–0	Lisburn Distillery
Linfield	0–2	Cliftonville

=== Semi-finals ===
Team 1	Score	Team 2
Ballymena United	1–2	Crusaders
Glentoran	2–1	Cliftonville

=== Final ===
30 October 2007

Glentoran	2–1	Crusaders
Scullion 64'; Berry 68'		Morrow 90+2'

Windsor Park, Belfast
Referee: David Best (Newtownabbey)
