= Mick McDermott =

Northern Irish footballer (born 1974)

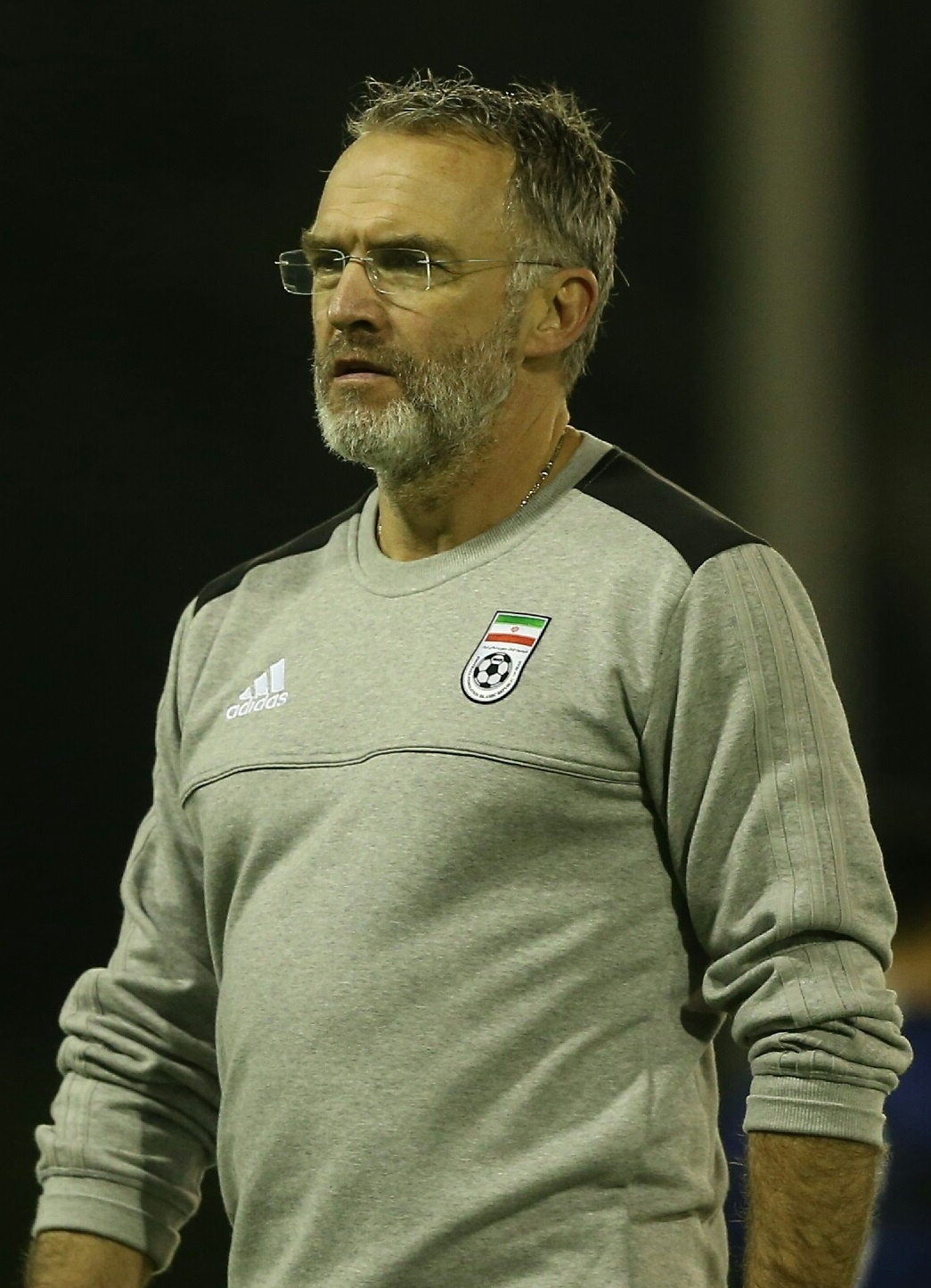

Personal information
- Full name: Michael McDermott
- Date of birth: 7 February 1974 (age 52)
- Place of birth: Belfast, Northern Ireland
- Position: Defender

Team information
- Current team: Ghana (assistant coach)

Youth career
- Cliftonville
- Distillery

College career
Years	Team	Apps	(Gls)
1992–1995	Rhode Island Rams	68	(8)

Senior career*
Years	Team	Apps	(Gls)
1997–1998	Connecticut Wolves	36	(0)
1999–2000	Raleigh Capital Express	29	(0)
2001	Long Island Rough Riders	21	(0)
Total		96	(0)

International career
1992	Northern Ireland U18	3	(0)

Managerial career
- 2017: Esteghlal (interim)
- 2019–2023: Glentoran
- 2024–2025: Cobh Ramblers
- * Club domestic league appearances and goals

Michael McDermott (born 1974) is a UEFA 'Pro' Licensed Northern Irish professional football manager and former player who is assistant coach of the Ghana national team.

== Playing career ==
Born in Belfast, McDermott attended Belfast Boys' Model School and played for Cliftonville and Distillery at youth levels.

He won a soccer scholarship at the University of Rhode Island in the United States and later played in the USL Second Division.

McDermott was capped three times for the Northern Ireland national under-18 team.

== Coaching career ==
McDermott has held various coaching roles at senior Club and National team level; Al Ain FC (UAE), Esteghlal FC (Iran), Al Nasr FC (UAE), Glentoran FC (N.Ireland), Cobh Ramblers FC (Rep.Ireland), Iran National Team, Qatar National Team and currently Ghana National Team. He has participated in FIFA World Cup 2018 and 2026, AFC Asian Cup 2019, UEFA Conference League qualifiers 2020, 2021, 2023.

=== Iran national team and Esteghlal ===
McDermott was previously the fitness coach of the Iran national team during their successful 2014 FIFA World Cup qualification campaign. Prior to his second spell with the national team, on 2 July 2017 he was appointed as the assistant manager of Esteghlal. On 30 October 2017, after a brief spell as interim manager, McDermott terminated his contract by mutual agreement.

After leaving Esteghlal, he returned to the national team to work alongside Carlos Queiroz as an assistant coach for the 2018 FIFA World Cup and the 2019 AFC Asian Cup where they were knocked out in the semi-finals by Japan. When Queiroz became the head coach of Colombia in February 2019, it was announced that McDermott would join him.

=== Glentoran ===
On 31 March 2019, McDermott took the job of Glentoran manager. Interim manager Gary Smyth, who could no longer fulfil the role due to a lack of necessary UEFA coaching qualifications, returned to his former role as assistant. In his first full season, McDermott managed the club to victory in the Irish Cup final, defeating Ballymena United 2–1 at Windsor Park and thus securing a place in the 2020–21 UEFA Europa League preliminary round.

McDermott strengthened the squad ahead of the 2020–21 season, signing former Northern Ireland international Luke McCullough as well as Gibraltar goalkeeper Dayle Coleing and Burundi midfielder Gaël Bigirimana. McDermott's side defeated Faroese team HB 1–0 in the preliminary round, before being knocked out in a 5–1 defeat away to Scottish side Motherwell. He was replaced by assistant manager Rodney McAree as manager on 17 January 2023 after a poor run of form.

=== Cobh Ramblers ===
After spending time as the assistant manager of the Qatar national team, McDermott was named manager of League of Ireland First Division club Cobh Ramblers on 4 December 2024. On 19 May 2025, he guided his side to a 2–0 win over Rockmount at Turners Cross to win the Munster Senior Cup. On 20 October 2025, it was announced that McDermott had departed the club, just days before the promotion play-offs began, having finished second in the league.

=== Ghana national team ===
Ahead of the 2026 FIFA World Cup, McDermott was hired as one of the coaching staff for the Ghana national team under newly appointed manager Carlos Queiroz.

== Personal life ==
McDermott married to Karla in 1996, who was a fellow student at University of Rhode Island and a U.S. citizen. As of 2019, the couple had two sons and two daughters.

== Managerial statistics ==
As of match played 17 October 2025

Managerial record by team and tenure
Team	From	To	Record							
Team	From	To	P	W	D	L	GF	GA	GD	Win %
Esteghlal (caretaker)	21 September 2017	2 October 2017	1	1	0	0	2	1	+1	100.00
Glentoran	31 March 2019	17 January 2023	158	92	32	34	294	152	+142	58.23
Cobh Ramblers	4 December 2024	20 October 2025	42	26	6	10	83	45	+38	61.90
Total			201	119	38	44	379	198	+181	59.20

== Honours ==
=== Managerial ===
Glentoran

- Irish Cup: 2019–20

Cobh Ramblers

- Munster Senior Cup: 2024–25

=== Individual ===
- Atlantic 10 Conference Student-Athlete of the Year: 1995
