= 1998–99 County Antrim Shield =

Tournament details
- Country: Northern Ireland
- Teams: 15

Final positions
- Champions: Glentoran (21st win)
- Runners-up: Cliftonville

Tournament statistics
- Matches played: 14
- Goals scored: 48 (3.43 per match)

The 1998–99 County Antrim Shield was the 110th edition of the County Antrim Shield, a cup competition in Northern Irish football.

Glentoran won the tournament for the 21st time, defeating Cliftonville 2–0 in the final. For the 13th year running a club from County Armagh competed (Newry Town), however Portadown did not compete in this edition.

== Results ==
=== First round ===
Team 1	Score	Team 2
Ards	2–1	Bangor
Ballyclare Comrades	0–5	Linfield
Cliftonville	2–0	Crusaders
Distillery	3–2	Dunmurry Recreation
Dungannon Swifts	3–1	Carrick Rangers
Glentoran	2–1	Newry Town
Larne	2–0	RUC
Ballymena United	bye	

=== Quarter-finals ===
Team 1	Score	Team 2
Cliftonville	3–1	Ards
Dungannon Swifts	2–4	Distillery
Glentoran	1–0	Ballymena United
Larne	1–5	Linfield

=== Semi-finals ===
Team 1	Score	Team 2
Cliftonville	2–0	Distillery
Linfield	1–2	Glentoran

=== Final ===
2 February 1999

Glentoran	2–0	Cliftonville
Kirk 40'; Elliott 42'

Windsor Park, Belfast
Referee: Herbie Barr (Bangor)
