= Dennis Setterington =

Scottish footballer (1945–2005)

Personal information
- Date of birth: 17 November 1945
- Place of birth: Bo'ness, Scotland
- Date of death: 13 December 2005 (aged 60)
- Place of death: Stirling, Scotland
- Position: Midfielder

Youth career
- 1962–1965: Rangers

Senior career*
Years	Team	Apps	(Gls)
1965–1970	Rangers	13	(4)
1970–1973	Falkirk	61	(10)
1974–1976	Stirling Albion	21	(2)
Total		95	(16)
- * Club domestic league appearances and goals

Dennis Setterington (17 November 1945 – 13 December 2005) was a Scottish footballer, who played for Rangers, Falkirk and Stirling Albion.

Setterington, who was a Scottish schoolboy international, signed for Rangers immediately after leaving school. He spent eight years with Rangers, ⁣ but was unable to hold down a regular first team place. He was transferred to Falkirk in 1970 for £10,000 and was replaced in the Rangers squad by Derek Johnstone.
