= Roy Coyle =

Northern Irish footballer and manager (1946–2026)

Personal information
- Full name: Robert Irvine Coyle
- Date of birth: 31 January 1946
- Place of birth: Belfast, Northern Ireland
- Date of death: 20 November 2026 (aged 80)
- Position: Defensive midfielder

Youth career
- East Belfast
- Ballyclare Comrades

Senior career*
Years	Team	Apps	(Gls)
1966–1969	Ballymena United	38	(3)
1969–1972	Glentoran	128	(6)
1972–1974	Sheffield Wednesday	40	(0)
1974–1975	Grimsby Town	24	(1)
1975–1980	Linfield	125	(4)
Total		355	(14)

International career
1973	Northern Ireland	5	(0)

Managerial career
- 1975–1990: Linfield
- 1990–1991: Ards
- 1991–1993: Derry City
- 1993–1997: Ards
- 1997–2006: Glentoran
- 2006–2007: Newry City
- 2012: Glentoran (caretaker)
- 2015: Glentoran (caretaker)
- 2016: Glentoran (caretaker)
- * Club domestic league appearances and goals

Robert Irvine Coyle (31 January 1946 – 20 November 2026) was a Northern Ireland football player and manager.

The winner of fifty trophies, including 13 league titles, Coyle was the most successful manager ever in the history of the Irish League. His success at Linfield included six league titles in a row in the 1980s. He was also a very successful manager and director of football at Glentoran.

== Playing career ==
Coyle was a wing-half with Ballymena United, Glentoran, Sheffield Wednesday and Grimsby Town. He won two Irish League titles and played in Europe six times while with Glentoran before winning five Northern Ireland international caps while playing for Sheffield Wednesday.

== Personal life and death ==
Coyle was born on 31 January 1946.

He was married to Abby. His son Darrin also played for Linfield and briefly for Everton.

Coyle died on 20 November 2026, at the age of 80.

== Managerial statistics ==
Team	From	To	Record								
Team	From	To	G	W	D	L	GF	GA	GD	Win %	Ref
Linfield	November 1975	April 1990	759	504	122	133	1,677	724	+953	66.40	
Ards	May 1990	June 1991	49	21	10	18	81	65	+16	42.86	
Derry City	June 1991	September 1993	68	29	25	14	77	49	+28	42.65	
Ards	October 1993	November 1997	188	76	32	80	329	316	+13	40.43	
Glentoran	November 1997	February 2006	446	279	77	90	891	410	+481	62.56	
Newry City	1 February 2006	1 January 2007	36	13	13	10	50	49	+1	36.11	
Glentoran (interim)	January 2012	February 2012	4	2	1	1	7	5	+2	50.00	
Glentoran (interim)	October 2015	November 2015	3	2	1	0	3	1	+2	66.67	
Glentoran (interim)	August 2016	August 2016	5	2	0	3	3	7	−4	40.00	
Total			1,558	928	281	349	3,021	1,553	+1468	59.56	—

== See also ==
- List of football managers with the most matches
