= 1965–66 Irish Cup =

Tournament details
- Country: Northern Ireland
- Teams: 16

Final positions
- Champions: Glentoran (8th win)
- Runners-up: Linfield

Tournament statistics
- Matches played: 22
- Goals scored: 89 (4.05 per match)

The 1965–66 Irish Cup was the 86th edition of the Irish Cup, the premier knock-out cup competition in Northern Irish football. Glentoran won for the 8th time, defeating Linfield 1–0 in the final at the Oval. They eliminated defending champions Coleraine in the semi-finals.

== Results ==
=== First round ===
Team 1	Score	Team 2
Ards	3–2	Portadown
Brantwood	2–1	Cliftonville
Derry City	2–2	Ballymena United
Distillery	4–0	Bangor
Glentoran	4–3	Banbridge Town
Larne	2–7	Coleraine
Linfield	1–0	Glenavon
Newry Town	2–2	Crusaders

==== Replay ====
Team 1	Score	Team 2
Ballymena United	3–1	Derry City
Crusaders	10–1	Newry Town

=== Quarter-finals ===
Team 1	Score	Team 2
Ards	1–3	Crusaders
Ballymena United	1–1	Coleraine
Distillery	1–1	Glentoran
Linfield	5–1	Brantwood

==== Replay ====
Team 1	Score	Team 2
Coleraine	2–2	Ballymena United
Glentoran	1–1	Distillery

==== Second replay ====
Team 1	Score	Team 2
Ballymena United	1–2	Coleraine
Distillery	1–2	Glentoran

=== Semi-finals ===
Team 1	Score	Team 2
Glentoran	1–1	Coleraine
Linfield	2–0	Crusaders

==== Replay ====
Team 1	Score	Team 2
Glentoran	5–0	Coleraine

=== Final ===
23 April 1966

Glentoran	2–0	Linfield
Conroy 32', 88'	Report

The Oval, Belfast
Attendance: 20,000
Referee: J. Adair (Belfast)
