= Marty Quinn (footballer) =

Irish footballer and football manager

Martin Quinn is a former Irish League footballer and a current manager. Quinn is well known for leading Cliftonville to become Irish League champions in 1998, and leading Coleraine to Irish Cup glory in 2003.

== Playing career ==
The Belfast-born Quinn began his playing career with Star of the Sea junior club. He then spent eight years as a central defender with Cliftonville F.C. where he won the County Antrim Shield and the Irish Cup in 1978–79 and the Gold Cup in 1980–81. In 1981, he joined Distillery where he played over 200 games and won another Co. Antrim Shield in 1985–86. Quinn left Distillery in 1987 and finished his playing career with a brief spell at Drogheda United F.C.

== Managerial career ==
=== Distillery ===
Quinn's first coaching appointment was a manager of Distillery IIs during 1987–88 where he won the George Wilson Cup. He was promoted to first team manager in September 1988 but resigned in November 1989 after a run of poor results. He returned to Cliftonville F.C.

=== Cliftonville ===
At Cliftonville, where he acted as reserve team manager and then assistant manager before taking charge of the first team in October 1994, initially as caretaker before being appointed full-time the following month. In five years in charge at Solitude he brought a level of success not seen in nearly a century as "the Reds" claimed the Coca-Cola Cup in 1995–96, the County Antrim Shield in 1996–97, and in 1998 the Irish League title. It had been 88 years since Cliftonville won the league trophy. Quinn won manager of the year in 1998. In addition he also claimed the Irish FA Charity Shield with a win over Glentoran

Quinn also came close twice to winning the Irish Cup but lost two finals in three years. In 1997 the club lost 1–0 to Glentoran in the final. Two years later Quinn led the club to a final tie against Portadown F.C. but the match was never played. The Irish FA ruled that Simon Gribben, who came on as a substitute in the semi-final replay against Linfield F.C., was cup-tied on account of having appeared in the competitions preliminary stages and so the cup was awarded to Portadown with no game played.

=== Coleraine FC ===
Quinn was appointed manager of Coleraine F.C. in October 1999. He took an unfancied Coleraine side to the Irish Cup Final in 2002–03, in which they beat Glentoran in the final 1–0. Quinn had finally won The Irish Cup after coming close to winning the trophy twice with Cliftonville. The following year, Coleraine were in the final again, against Glentoran, but it was the Belfast side who came out winners. In addition Coleraine won the North West Senior Cup three times, twice finished as Irish League runners-up and reached the finals of Gold Cup and Irish League Cup under Quinn's leadership. He continued as Coleraine manager during uncertain times while the club experienced severe financial problems. The club made it to the Irish Cup final again, this time it was against Linfield but lost in the final. Quinn also won The North West cup twice with The Bannsiders. Quinn stunned Coleraine fans by resigning as manager.

=== Bangor FC ===
Quinn made a shock resignation from Coleraine FC to become Bangor FC manager. Despite Bangor being favourites to go down that year, he defied the odds and had a very successful rein at Clandeboye Park. At one point during the season, they were top of the league. Although that didn't last, he still brought them to a hugely impressive 7th spot before resigning due to Bangor deciding that they wouldn't renew their Premiership licence for the 2009/2010 campaign. Bangor were the first club with which Quinn failed to win a trophy.

=== Glenavon FC ===
He was appointed Glenavon manager soon after resigning as Bangor manager. Quinn then went on to again prove his genius, narrowly keeping the club in the top tier of Northern Irish football, losing just one of his first nine games at the helm. In the 2010–11 season, Quinn wasted no time adding new faces to the Lurgan Blues squad. He signed goalkeeper Andrew Plummer who played under Quinn at Bangor, and bringing in Pat Jennings Jr. from Shamrock Rovers as backup. He also signed Glentoran defender Kyle Neill, along with Neill's teammate Willo McDonagh. Quinn also brought in Gary Hamilton on loan from Glentoran and buying Linfield F.C. striker Mark Miskimmin. Under Quinn, the Lurgan Blues won the Mid Ulster Cup over Dungannon Swifts. In the 2011–12 season, Quinn signed goalkeeper Andy Coleman, midfielder Conor Hagan and striker Andy Graham from Newry City F.C., Peter McCann from Lisburn Distillery F.C., Davy O'Hare from Coleraine F.C. and Jonathan Magee from Crusaders F.C. Despite building what looked like a promising squad, Glenavon had a run of poor results and ending at the bottom of the table. Quinn resigned on 26 November after a 1–1 draw against Dungannon Swifts.

== Honours ==
=== Playing career ===
Cliftonville

- County Antrim Shield 1978–79
- Irish Cup 1978–79
- Gold Cup 1980–81

Distillery

- County Antrim Shield 1985–86

=== Managerial career ===
Cliftonville

- Coca-Cola Cup 1995–96
- County Antrim Shield 1996–97
- Irish League 1997–98
- Irish FA Charity Shield 1997–98

Coleraine

- Irish Cup 2002–03
- North West Senior Cup (three times)

Glenavon

- Mid-Ulster Cup 2009–10, 2010–11
