= 1999–2000 County Antrim Shield =

Tournament details
- Country: Northern Ireland
- Teams: 16

Final positions
- Champions: Glentoran (22nd win)
- Runners-up: Bangor

Tournament statistics
- Matches played: 15
- Goals scored: 47 (3.13 per match)

The 1999–2000 County Antrim Shield was the 111th edition of the County Antrim Shield, a cup competition in Northern Irish football.

Glentoran won the tournament for the 22nd time and 2nd consecutive season, defeating Bangor 2–1 in the final. For the 14th year running a club from County Armagh competed (Newry Town), however this was the final year they would participate.

== Results ==
=== First round ===
Team 1	Score	Team 2
Ballyclare Comrades	0–2	Glentoran
Bangor	1–0	Ballymena United
Carrick Rangers	2–1	Comber Recreation
Crusaders	3–0	Shorts
Larne	3–1	East Belfast
Linfield	3–1	Dundela
Lisburn Distillery	1–2	Ards
Newry Town	2–1	Cliftonville

=== Quarter-finals ===
Team 1	Score	Team 2
Bangor	2–1	Larne
Carrick Rangers	1–5	Ards
Glentoran	1–0	Linfield
Newry Town	2–3 (a.e.t.)	Crusaders

=== Semi-finals ===
Team 1	Score	Team 2
Ards	1–4	Glentoran
Bangor	1–0	Crusaders

=== Final ===
1 February 2000

Glentoran	2–1	Bangor
Elliott 3'; Russell 75'		McPherson 63'

Castlereagh Park, Newtownards
Referee: Frankie Hiles (Newtownards)
