= Gary Smyth =

Northern Irish footballer (born 1969)

Personal information
- Date of birth: 20 December 1969 (age 56)
- Place of birth: Belfast, Northern Ireland
- Position: Centre back

Senior career*
Years	Team	Apps	(Gls)
1988–1995	Glentoran	84	(5)
1995–2000	Glenavon	123	(9)
2000–2004	Glentoran	183	(23)
2004–2006	Ballymena United	50	(8)
2006–2008	Glentoran	34	(0)
2007–2008	→ Crusaders (loan)	26	(1)
2008–2009	Crusaders	16	(0)
Total		514	(46)

International career
1997	Northern Ireland B	1	(0)

Managerial career
- 2013–2018: H&W Welders
- 2019: Glentoran
- 2019–2022: H&W Welders
- * Club domestic league appearances and goals

Gary Smyth (born 20 December 1969) is a Northern Irish former football player and manager. He played as a centre back for Glentoran, Glenavon, Ballymena and Crusaders. He previously managed Glentoran in 2019 and had two spells managing H&W Welders, first from 2013 to 2018 and the second spell from 2019 to 2022.

== Playing career ==
Smyth was born in Belfast. He signed for Glentoran from Holywood in 1988, winning numerous trophies and remaining there until 1995, when he signed for Glenavon, where he enjoyed more success, before returning to The Oval in 2000. He was named as the Ulster Footballer of the Year for the 2002–03 season. In 2007, he joined Crusaders, initially on loan, and later on a permanent transfer.

He won four Irish Cup winners' medals, with Glentoran in 2004, Glenavon in 1997, and Crusaders in 2009. He retired on 9 May 2009 following the Irish Cup final.

== Managerial career ==
=== H&W Welders (2013–2018) ===
Smyth was manager of H&W Welders between 2013 and 2018, proving a successful manager. He left on 23 May 2018.

=== Glentoran (2018–2019) ===
Smyth left his role at H&W Welders to join his former team Glentoran, which was officially announced on 24 May 2018. He initially joined as an assistant manager to the incoming Ronnie McFall, where the future plan was to promote him when he had all necessary qualifications. Paul Leeman also joined Smyth as a part of the deal. However McFall resigned earlier than expected following poor results which allowed Smyth to become manager. He held the management spot from 3 January 2019 until 31 March 2019, when he was replaced with Mick McDermott. Smyth was returned to the role of assistant manager, however he didn't return to the dug-out and left the club in controversial circumstances on 21 May 2019, with Leeman leaving two days later. Smyth voiced his disgust at how he had been treated by the club.

=== H&W Welders (2019–2022) ===
On 13 December 2019, it was announced Smyth had returned to manage H&W Welders. After around 2 and a half years at his second spell at the club, Smyth was dismissed in August 2022 following a poor start to the season.

=== Managerial statistics ===
(Statistics apply to league matches only)

Team	Nation	From	To	Record				
Team	Nation	From	To	P	W	D	L	Win %
H&W Welders	Northern Ireland	24 November 2013	23 May 2018	?	?	?	?	
Glentoran	Northern Ireland	3 January 2019	30 March 2019	12	5	2	5	41.67%
H&W Welders	Northern Ireland	13 December 2019	30 August 2022	?	?	?	?	
Total				12	5	2	5	41.67%

== Honours ==
Glentoran

- Irish League: 1991–92, 2002–03
- Irish Cup: 2000–01, 2003–04
- Irish League Cup: 1990–91, 2000–01, 2002–03, 2006–07
- Gold Cup: 1991–92, 2000–01
- County Antrim Shield: 2000–01, 2001–02

Glenavon

- Irish Cup: 1996–97
- Gold Cup: 1997–98
- County Antrim Shield: 1995–96
- Mid-Ulster Cup: 1998–99
- Floodlit Cup: 1996–97

Crusaders

- Irish Cup: 2008-09
