= Glentoran F.C. =

Association football club in Northern Ireland

Coordinates: 54°36′11″N 5°53′29″W

Glentoran
- Full name: Glentoran Football Club
- Nicknames: The Glens; The Cock and Hens
- Founded: 1882; 144 years ago
- Ground: The Oval
- Capacity: 15,293 (6,500 safe capacity)
- Owner: Ali Pour
- Chairman: Colin Jess
- Manager: Duncan Ferguson
- League: NIFL Premiership
- 2025–26: NIFL Premiership, 3rd of 12
- Website: glentoran.com
Home colours	Away colours

Glentoran is a professional football club based in East Belfast, Northern Ireland, that plays in the NIFL Premiership. The club was founded in 1882 and has since won more than 130 major honours. They are one of three Irish League teams to have never been relegated.

== History ==
=== Early years ===
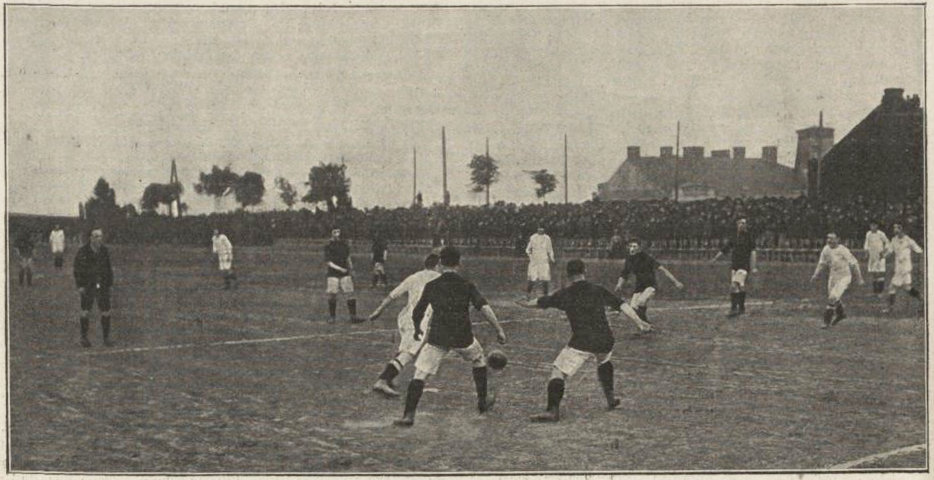
Vienna XI (white) - Glentoran (1914)

Glentoran was founded in 1882 by the workers of the Protestant-dominated Harland & Wolff shipyard, and draws much of its identity from its industrial roots in East Belfast. The shipyard’s cranes still overlook their ground - The Oval - symbolising the club’s heritage. In 1889, Glentoran FC was established as a limited company, and benefited from investments by local industrial leaders Viscount Pirrie and G.W. Wolff. This investment further tied the club to the nearby Harland and Wolff shipyard workers.

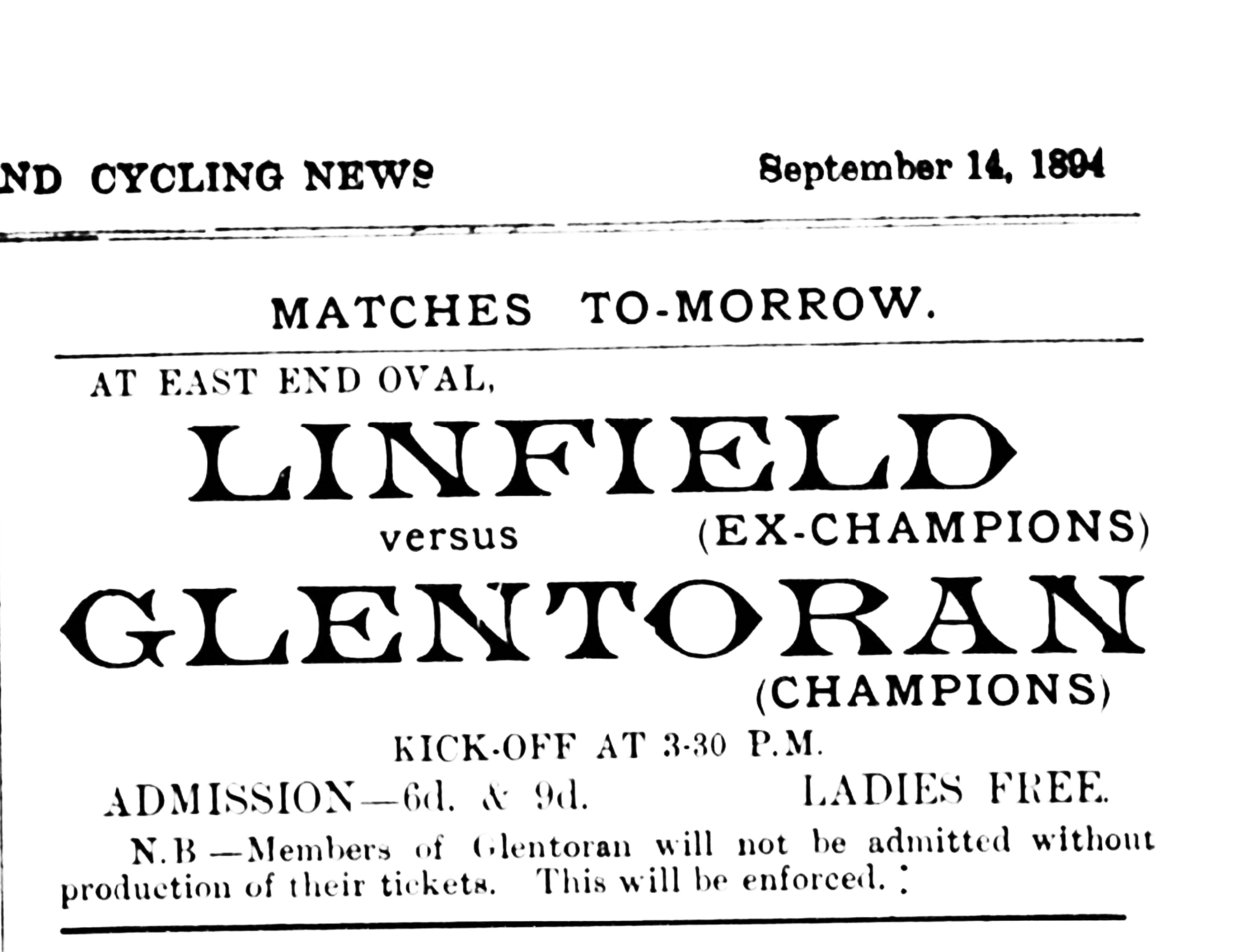
Published Friday 14 September 1894 in the Ulster Football and Cycling News, an Advert for a game between ex-Irish League Champions Linfield and the recently crowned champions, Glentoran.

Glentoran made its first appearance in the Irish Cup during the 1886-87 season. They reached the semi-final of the competition, where they were beaten 2-1 by Ulster. The Irish League was established in 1890, with Glentoran being among the founding members, alongside Clarence, Cliftonville, Distillery, Linfield, Milford, Oldpark and Ulster. In the inaugural season, Glentoran finished in 5th place. In 1894, Glentoran won the first of its 23 league titles.

=== Vienna Cup ===
In 1914, Glentoran undertook their first European tour, with the key highlight being their participation and victory in the Vienna Cup. The tour began with a 4-3 loss to Deutsche in Prague, followed by a 4-1 win over Hertha Berlin. The team then traveled to Vienna for the Vienna Cup, a week-long tournament organised by the Vienna Football Club. In the first match against a Vienna select team, Glentoran dominated but conceded a late equalizer, resulting in a 1-1 draw. The final match was decisive, and Glentoran secured a convincing victory to win the Vienna Cup, making them both the first UK and the first Irish team to claim a European trophy.

=== 1960s ===
In 1964–65, Glentoran faced Panathinaikos in the European Cup and drew 2–2 at home and lost 3–2 away. In the following season's Fairs Cup, they faced Antwerp resulting a 1–0 defeat away and 3–3 draw at home. The Cup-Winners' Cup in 1966–67 saw Glentoran draw 1–1 with Rangers in front of a packed Oval before losing the away leg 4–0.

Glentoran’s greatest moment in Europe came in a 1967 European Cup tie against Benfica. In the first leg at The Oval, Glentoran took an early lead with a penalty before football legend Eusébio equalized, ending the match 1–1. In the return leg at Benfica’s Estádio da Luz, part-time Glentoran defied expectations with a 0–0 draw. Although Benfica advanced on away goals, Glentoran became the first team eliminated by this rule and the first to prevent Benfica from scoring at home.

In 1967, Glentoran took the unusual step of running the Detroit Cougars football franchise in the United Soccer Association. The newly formed league had planned for an inaugural season in 1968, but when the rival National Professional Soccer League announced a start date of 1967 and a television contract with CBS, the league owners decided to fast track their league by importing entire squads from Europe and South America.

George Best watched Glentoran with his grandfather as a youth, but was rejected by the club for being "too small and light". However, Best did make one appearance for Glentoran, in the club's centenary match against Manchester United.

=== 1970s ===
The club won the Irish league title in 1972 and 1977, coupled with an Irish Cup win in 1973. This cup win gave Glentoran a place the following season in the European Cup Winners Cup. In November 1973, Glentoran made history by becoming the first Irish club to reach the quarter-finals of the competition with a 3–1 victory over Brann in Belfast, following a 1–1 draw in Bergen. They faced Borussia Mönchengladbach in the quarter-finals and were beaten 2–0 and 5–0. Four seasons later they faced Juventus in a European Cup match and lost 1–0 at home and 5–0 away.

=== 1980s ===
In 1981–82, Glentoran reached the second round of the European Cup and faced eventual semi-finalists CSKA Sofia. After a 2–0 defeat away, Glentoran went 2–0 up in the return leg to force the game into extra time. The final result was 2–1, Glentoran going out 3–2 on aggregate.

The 1985 Irish Cup final between Glentoran and Linfield featured a memorable incident: Glentoran fans brought a cockerel, their club emblem, and a pig painted in Linfield’s royal blue to the match, both of which stayed on the sidelines throughout. Fans repeated the cockerel tradition at the 2006 final, but Glentoran lost 2–1, ending their unbeaten post-war record of five consecutive Irish Cup final victories against Linfield, a streak that began in 1966.

=== 1990s ===
In 1995 Glentoran played their traditional Boxing Day match against Linfield on a snow-covered pitch. In the first half the orange ball was damaged, and not having a replacement the teams were forced to play with a white ball for the remainder of the game. The incident was used as a "What Happened Next" question on the BBC's A Question of Sport.

Former Linfield manager Roy Coyle took charge of the club in 1997 and under his stewardship the club entered another period of success. In Coyle's first cup final in charge he gave up the right to lead the team out, instead he asked long serving Kitman Teddy Horner have this honour.

=== 2000s ===
The 2002–03 season was successful for the club. Of the four trophies available in Northern Ireland, Glentoran won three, capturing the Irish League championship, Irish League Cup and County Antrim Shield but losing the Irish Cup Final 1–0 to Coleraine. The only Irish League to win all trophies is Linfield who have achieved this on 3 occasions. They won 7 trophies in 1921–22 and 7 in 1961–62 and also 4 trophies in 1955–56.

WOn 23 April 2005, Glentoran defeated their rivals Linfield in the second last game but one of the league season. In the 93rd minute of the match, Glentoran, who needed victory in order to have a chance of clinching the league title, scored a goal via their centre forward (and former Linfield player) Chris Morgan. There were confrontations between the two sets of fans following the match. Hooliganism was commonplace at matches between the clubs in the past.

Roy Coyle won 16 trophies with Glentoran and is the club's most successful manager in the club's history.

=== Financial troubles (2011–2019) ===
==== Millar (2006–2007) ====
After eight years in charge of Glentoran, Roy Coyle resigned as manager after a string of indifferent results. On 14 February 2006 the club announced that former Newry City manager Paul Millar was to take over the manager's position. He led the team into the Irish Cup final with rivals Linfield. Despite taking the lead in the first half, Linfield won the game with two goals from Peter Thompson. He also led his new club to their biggest ever defeat against their cross-city rivals Linfield in a 6–0 defeat at Windsor Park. The Glens had sought to reduce the gap between them and Linfield by signing Kyle Neill and Gary Hamilton from Portadown and re-signing former fan's favourite Gary Smyth. Also arriving was another former player, Jason Hill, former Portadown and Newry City player Cullen Feeney and promising young keeper Ciaran McLaughlin from Ards.

Paul Millar was dismissed as manager on 17 May 2007, after just 15 months in the role. Despite leading the team to two consecutive second-place finishes behind Linfield, he lost the support of the board and fans.

==== McDonald (2007–2010) ====
On 24 May 2007 former Crusaders and Glenavon manager Roy Walker was appointed as Glentoran manager along with assistant manager Billy Sinclair. Walker previously led Crusaders to two league titles in 1995 and 1997. After leaving football management for seven years, Walker became a football analyst with BBC Radio Ulster. He was quoted as saying, "Glentoran were my boyhood team and are probably the only club which could have attracted me back."

However, on 26 May 2007 it was revealed that Walker would not be able to take up the post, due to not possessing the necessary UEFA coaching qualifications. Less than a week later, Glentoran appointed Alan McDonald as manager, replacing Roy Walker, who stepped down but vowed not to rest until director of football Tom Dick resigned. Dick eventually did so but criticized chairman Stafford Reynolds, who later announced he would step down if a suitable replacement was found. As manager, McDonald secured several players, including former Glentoran player Rory Hamill, Daryl Fordyce (Portsmouth), Jamie McGovern (West Brom), David Scullion (Dungannon Swifts), and re-signed Chris Morgan and Tim McCann. Meanwhile, Darren Lockhart and Gary Smith left on loan to Crusaders. In January, Glentoran added Shane McCabe (Dungannon) and Darren Boyce (Coleraine) to the squad.

Alan McDonald won two trophies with The Glens and also led the Glens to the final of the Setanta Cup. In McDonald's first season as manager, Glentoran defeated Crusaders in the County Antrim Shield final. The next season, Glentoran won the league after a strong race with Linfield. Glentoran finished three successive seasons, 2006–2008, as runners-up to three times Double Champions Linfield. Since then, notable signings at the club include Matthew Burrows from Dundela, Johnny Taylor (from Hearts) and former Lisburn Distillery player Andy Waterworth for a fee of £30,000. Glentoran's build up to the season included friendlies against Hearts, Burnley and Ipswich Town. However, Glentoran's start to the season was delayed by a referee strike led by their association's Chairman, David Malcolm, citing higher wage demands. This ultimately postponed all week one fixtures. The following week, in the game against Glenavon, Glentoran's pitch was declared unplayable. Matches against Bangor and then Linfield were cancelled, and this led to Glentoran facing Bangor in the first Irish League game to be played on a Sunday. The historic scoreline was 1–0.

Glentoran also unexpectedly reached the final of the Setanta Sports Cup 2008, a cup in which the top four clubs from both the Irish League and League of Ireland play each other. Glentoran defeated Linfield with a 4–1 win, making the group a more open competition. This was followed up by a 1–0 win in a home match again St. Patrick's Athletic. In the final on 13 October 2008, Glentoran were defeated by League of Ireland side Cork City 2–1 at Turners Cross. On 2 May 2009 Glentoran won the first ever Irish Premiership by defeating Cliftonville 3–1 at The Oval. This was their first league title since a 2005 win, ending Linfield's 3-year dominance on all fronts. Alan McDonald would in the coming weeks sign a new 2-year contract with the club after much speculation, keeping him there until 2011. Glentoran's only summer signings for 2009 were Richard Clarke from Newry City and Northern Ireland international Keith Gillespie on a free transfer.

==== Young (2010–2012) ====
In March 2010, after McDonald resigned, former player Scott Young was put in charge of the Glens until the end of the 2010–11 season along with Pete Batey as assistant manager and Tim McCann as head coach. Young led Glentoran into the 2009–10 Irish League Cup final against Coleraine. The bannsiders were the favourites for the match but the Glens were the team who came out victorious, winning 4–1 on penalties after the match ended in a 2–2 draw. At the end of the season, Young along with Batey and McCann signed a deal with the Glens to stay on as manager. Former Glentoran manager Roy Coyle, who brought a huge amount of success, became director of football.

Young released some of the club's higher-profile players, including Michael Halliday and Keith Gillespie. Halliday joined North Belfast side Crusaders. Kyle Neill also left the club and joined Glenavon. Dean Fitzgerald and Shane McCabe were also among the players released.

Gary Hamilton went out on loan to Glenavon, and back in December 2011 took on the role as manager of the club (after the resignation of Marty Quinn), after being released of his playing obligations by Glentoran. During Young's first season as manager, Glentoran's financial difficulties escalated, until HMRC issued Glentoran a winding-up order, and gave the club until the beginning of January 2011 to clear all outstanding debts which totalled over £300,000. A fundraising organisation, Spirit of '41 (which was named after the year when The Oval was bombed by Germans and the massive effort to rebuild it) was set up, and to this day has raised over £25,000. On 12 January 2011, a special EGM was held which set out the proposals that would save Glentoran from oblivion and change radically how the club is run. The vote was passed unanimously with the condition that 3 new board members were added, including a new chairman, and the previous chairman stepped down to vice-chairman.

On 5 October 2010, Glentoran player Matty Burrows scored a backheel goal against Portadown, which won Burrows the ESPN goal of the season and Sky Sports goal of the season. The goal also achieved millions of views on YouTube and went up against world-famous player Lionel Messi for the FIFA goal of the season award. Burrows narrowly lost out on the award with many saying he did not win because he wasn't a high-profile player.

On 7 July 2011, Glentoran beat Macedonian side FK Renova in the Europa League first qualifying round after the Glens overturned a 2–1 away defeat by winning the home leg 2–1 at The Oval and thus levelling the score on aggregate. The match was decided by penalties. Glentoran progressed after winning the shoot-out 3–2.

Young started his second season very well, with a 2–1 win away to Crusaders. However, the 2011–12 season would turn out to be disappointing for Young and the club. Rory Patterson was set to come back at the club, but could not agree on the contract following the finance problems. Patterson joined Glentoran's bitter rivals Linfield. However, Matty Burrows returned to the club, but struggled to maintain his place. The club then started to go through a run of poor results and started to lose supporters. Despite beating Linfield three times, Glentoran lost in the County Antrim Shield final to Cliftonville and continued their losing streak in the league. On 14 January 2012, Glentoran were knocked out of the 2011–12 Irish Cup by Amateur league side Newington Youth Club. Young then resigned after the game. Director of Football Roy Coyle was put in charge for the match against Ballymena United.

==== Patterson (2012–2015) ====
Former Lisburn Distillery boss Paul Kirk, former Crusaders and Ballymena United boss Roy Walker, former Cliftonville boss Eddie Patterson, and former Coleraine boss Marty Quinn were among the possible contenders for the job including former player Pat McGibbon and Ian Foster. Walker and Patterson applied for the job along with McGibbon and Foster on 1 February 2012. Patterson was appointed manager of the club on Wednesday 22 February 2012. Glentoran finished the 2011–12 league season in 6th place, a massive 28 points behind the league champions; cross-city rivals Linfield. However, some consolation came from the fact that they beat Linfield in all four league meetings between the sides that season, without conceding a goal in the process.

During the summer of 2012, Patterson made several signings such as Marcus Kane, Jay Magee and Mark Clarke. The Glens started the 2012–13 season well with a 3–1 victory over Donegal Celtic. This was followed by three consecutive 1–1 draws against Glenavon, Cliftonville and Linfield. One day before the game against Linfield, the club announced the signing of Stuart Elliott, who was returning to the club where he made his name before moving across the water to play for Hull City, Motherwell and Hamilton Academical. Glentoran defeated Ballinamallard United 4–1 and Dungannon Swifts 3–1 in the space of a week, pushing them up to second in the league. The Glens then secured a 0–0 home draw against Coleraine in a top of the table clash before defeating Lisburn Distillery 3–0 a week later. A 1–1 draw against Ballymena United at the Showgrounds made it nine league games unbeaten from the start of the season.

However, the unbeaten run came to an end in the next game when Crusaders won 2–0 at Seaview on 6 October 2012, just 5 days after an enthralling County Antrim Shield quarter-final defeat against Linfield which saw three goals in the final minutes of the game, ending 3–2 to Linfield. One week after the Crusaders loss, Glentoran was beaten for the second successive league game (their first home loss of the season), when Portadown won 1–0 at The Oval.

The club's financial problems would soon come to light again. In November 2012 it was reported that the squad had refused to train because they had not received their wages for two months. If the problem continued, it may have reached the stage where the players would have the right to be released from their contracts. Back on the field, the club had mixed results in the next six league games. Three wins, a draw, and two defeats which included a disappointing 2–1 loss away to Donegal Celtic, left the Glens sitting in fifth place in the league at the end of November, twelve points behind pacesetters Cliftonville.

The 2012–13 league campaign ultimately ended with the club finishing fourth in the table. However, the season ended on a high note as the Glens overcame favourites and newly crowned league champions Cliftonville 3–1 after extra time in the Irish Cup final on 4 May 2013. This was the club's first Irish Cup win in nine years.

In the 2014–15 Season Glentoran won another Irish cup against Portadown and the 2nd under Eddie Patterson. The game was played at The Oval because construction work at Windsor park had gone wrong and the Kop stand was deemed unstable and needed to be knocked down. The game finished 1–0 after a very wet afternoon in East Belfast.

After defeating Carrick Rangers 2–0 at home, Eddie Patterson was sacked. Former manager Roy Coyle took over for the next game as caretaker boss.

==== Kernaghan (2015–2016) ====
On 9 November 2015 Alan Kernaghan was appointed as Glentoran manager. Kernaghan started with some promising results and managed to end the 2015/16 season in 5th Position.The Glens made several signings that summer in the hope of returning to the top 3 and returning to regular European football signing included former Ballymena United goalkeeper Dwayne Nelson, Portadown defender Ross Redman, resigned former player James Ferrin, Eric Foley from Galway United and the signing of Rangers Spanish legend Nacho Novo the Glens started the season inconsistently with two 1–0 wins against Dungannon Swifts and Portadown and two defeats against Cliftonville and struggling Carrick Rangers. The pressure starting to mount on Kernaghan was severely increased when they were beaten 4–1 by Coleraine with many thinking the writing was on the wall for Kernaghan reign as manager and following a shock 3–2 League Cup defeat to Championship side Annagh United, Kernaghan resigned as manager of Glentoran.

==== Haveron (2016–2018) ====
Gary Haveron became manager on 28 September 2016. In January 2017, Glentoran suffered a 2–1 Irish Cup 5th Round defeat at the Oval to fierce rivals Linfield after extra time. Haveron was sacked by the club on 21 February 2018, following a 2–1 defeat to Ards at the Oval, with the club citing his performances were not good enough. The team was sixth in the league at that stage. Haveron did, however, lead the Glens to a 2017 Boxing Day victory, beating Linfield 2–1.

==== McFall (2018–2019) ====
Following Haverons dismissal, Glentoran reappointed Ronnie McFall as manager. A management reshuffle was announced which saw Gary Smyth become his assistant manager and Paul Leeman become a coach at the club. Kieran Harding was also an assistant to McFall. McFalls second spell proved unsuccessful. McFall left the club on 3 January 2019. At that point, the team were 9th in the league table, 5 points above the relegation zone.

==== Smyth (2019) ====
Gary Smyth became the caretaker manager of Glentoran on 3 January 2019. His first match was a 4–1 defeat to Crusaders in the Irish Cup. Paul Leeman was his assistant, with Kieran Harding, who was assistant to McFall becoming a coach. The months after saw an improvement in form. Smyth, who did not hold the required coaching qualifications to lead the club into the playoffs or UEFA competition was replaced on 31 March 2019, the deadline day for UEFA Licensing by Mick McDermott.

=== New ownership and management (2019–) ===
Mick McDermott became Glentoran manager as part of a deal involving new investment in the club, which was approved by 96% of shareholders at an EGM on 16 May 2019. Paul Millar returned as assistant manager, while Kieran Harding stayed on as coach. However, Gary Smyth and Paul Leeman were absent from the dugout in subsequent matches. On 21 May, the club announced Smyth’s departure, a decision that divided fans. Leeman left two days later, despite both being offered their previous roles under the new management team.

On 4 February 2020, the Glentoran Chairman Stephen Henderson announced on behalf of the club, that it was finally free of external debt. Once having been £1.77 million in the red, the Board of Directors had cleared 80% of the debt across the decade and prior to the new investment in the club. A combination of the investor and the old board then settled the final remaining debt with the last outstanding creditor.

During McDermott's first full season in charge at the East Belfast club, he and Millar led the side to victory in the Irish Cup final on 31 July 2020. Glentoran defeated Ballymena United 2–1 in the final after extra-time, with goals coming from Paul O'Neill and Robbie McDaid.

McDermott was replaced by Rodney McAree on 17 January 2023. McAree managed Glentoran until the conclusion of the 2022/23 season, and guided them to European qualification. In June 2023, McAree departed Glentoran and was replaced by former Linfield manager, Warren Feeney. This move was one in that was viewed controversially by many Glentoran supporters, with Feeney’s Linfield history and lack of managerial success being two of the biggest sticking points with Glens fans.

In July 2023, Glentoran were involved in a record-breaking Europa Conference League game against Gzira United from Malta. The first leg finished 2-2, with the second leg finishing 1-1. The tie then went to extra time and penalties, with Gzira winning 14–13 on penalties. This was the highest scoring penalty shoot-out ever in European competition.

Feeney left the club by mutual consent on 15 March 2024, following a major backlash from most of the fans supporters clubs. Declan Devine was subsequently appointed as caretaker until the end of the season.

== Stadium and redevelopment ==
In March 2003, the club's board of directors advised the shareholders of Glentoran Recreation Company Ltd to sell the Oval to a property development holding company called Girona. To date, no new ground has materialised. A campaign waged by a group of volunteer supporters called Rest In East, was then set up to keep the club in east Belfast. The club's board of directors have suggested moving close to Comber, well outside the city bounds of Belfast, which the majority of supporters firmly oppose.

On 3 November 2005 a fans forum voted 417–0 in favour of forming Glentoran Community Trust, the first supporters' trust to be formed in Northern Ireland. It was officially formed on 15 May 2006 and registered with the Registry of Companies Belfast under the Industrial and Provident Societies Acts 1965–1978. The trust sits completely independent of the parent club, giving the ordinary non-shareholding supporter a voice. On 29 January 2008, the GCT took another historic step, when one of its members, Stephen Henderson was elected to the board of directors by the shareholders of Glentoran FC, with the most votes ever gained in an election. This would prove an important step for the club during the financial crisis that would soon engulf it.

On 12 January 2011, a resolution was passed that gives the GCT two permanent board members. Recently, Glentoran formed a strategic alliance partnership with Insaka AFC, the football club of the African Youth Diaspora in the Irish Republic by forming Insaka-Glentoran Football Academy at the same time becoming the first club on the island of Ireland to adopt a whole club approach to the UEFA 'Respect' campaign.

On 24 May 2016, supporters approved a board recommendation, at the club end of season AGM, to demolish and redevelop The Oval into a modern new community-based stadium, over alternative proposed moves to sites at Sydenham and Titanic Quarter. Funding will come from a £10million amount that has been on hold for the Glens under the Government's £110m sports grounds improvement programme that has led to the creation of the new Windsor Park and Ulster Rugby's Kingspan Stadium in tandem with redevelopment at venues across the country.

In March 2021 Glentoran submitted plans to redevelop The Oval, at cost of £8m to £10m. However the plans were suspended after the 2022 collapse of Stormont, as funding could not be secured.

== European record ==
=== Overview ===
Competition	P	W	D	L	GF	GA
European Cup / UEFA Champions League	28	3	7	18	20	59
Inter-Cities Fairs Cup / UEFA Cup / UEFA Europa League	50	5	9	36	31	122
UEFA Europa Conference League	4	0	3	1	4	6
European Cup Winners' Cup / UEFA Cup Winners' Cup	22	3	7	12	18	46
TOTAL	104	11	26	67	73	233

=== Matches ===
Season	Competition	Round	Opponent	Home	Away	Aggregate
1962–63	Inter-Cities Fairs Cup	1R	(Spain) Real Zaragoza	0–2	2–6	2–8
1963–64	Inter-Cities Fairs Cup	1R	(Scotland) Partick Thistle	1–4	0–3	1–7
1964–65	European Cup	1R	(Greece) Panathinaikos	2–2	2–3	4–5
1965–66	Inter-Cities Fairs Cup	1R	(Belgium) Royal Antwerp	3–3	0–1	3–4
1966–67	European Cup Winners' Cup	1R	(Scotland) Rangers	1–1	0–4	1–5
1967–68	European Cup	1R	(Portugal) Benfica	1–1	0–0	1–1 (a)
1968–69	European Cup	1R	(Belgium) Anderlecht	2–2	0–3	2–5
1969–70	Inter-Cities Fairs Cup	1R	(England) Arsenal	1–0	0–3	1–3
1970–71	European Cup	1R	(Republic of Ireland) Waterford	1–3	0–1	1–4
1971–72	UEFA Cup	1R	(West Germany) Eintracht Braunschweig	0–1	1–6	1–7
1973–74	European Cup Winners' Cup	1R	(Romania) Chimia Râmnicu Vâlcea	2–0	2–2	4–2
1973–74	European Cup Winners' Cup	2R	(Norway) Brann	3–1	1–1	4–2
1973–74	European Cup Winners' Cup	QF	(West Germany) Borussia Mönchengladbach	0–2	0–5	0–7
1975–76	UEFA Cup	1R	(Netherlands) Ajax	1–6	0–8	1–14
1976–77	UEFA Cup	1R	(Switzerland) Basel	3–2	0–3	3–5
1977–78	European Cup	1R	(Iceland) Valur	2–0	0–1	2–1
1977–78	European Cup	2R	(Italy) Juventus	0–1	0–5	0–6
1978–79	UEFA Cup	1R	(Iceland) ÍBV	1–1	0–0	1–1 (a)
1981–82	European Cup	1R	(Luxembourg) Progrès Niederkorn	4–0	1–1	5–1
1981–82	European Cup	2R	(Bulgaria) CSKA Sofia	2–1 (a.e.t.)	0–2	2–3
1982–83	UEFA Cup	1R	(Czechoslovakia) Baník Ostrava	1–3	0–1	1–4
1983–84	European Cup Winners' Cup	1R	(France) Paris Saint-Germain	1–2	1–2	2–4
1984–85	UEFA Cup	1R	(Belgium) Standard Liège	1–1	0–2	1–3
1985–86	European Cup Winners' Cup	1R	(Iceland) Fram	1–0	1–3	2–3
1986–87	European Cup Winners' Cup	1R	(East Germany) Lokomotive Leipzig	1–1	0–2	1–3
1987–88	European Cup Winners' Cup	1R	(Finland) RoPS	1–1	0–0	1–1 (a)
1988–89	European Cup	1R	(Soviet Union) Spartak Moscow	1–1	0–2	1–3
1989–90	UEFA Cup	1R	(Scotland) Dundee United	1–3	0–2	1–5
1990–91	European Cup Winners' Cup	1R	(Romania) Steaua București	1–1	0–5	1–6
1992–93	UEFA Champions League	1R	(France) Marseille	0–5	0–3	0–8
1996–97	UEFA Cup Winners' Cup	QR	(Czech Republic) Sparta Prague	1–2	0–8	1–10
1998–99	UEFA Cup Winners' Cup	QR	(Israel) Maccabi Haifa	0–1	1–2	1–3
1999–00	UEFA Champions League	1QR	(Bulgaria) Litex Lovech	0–2	0–3	0–5
2000–01	UEFA Cup	QR	(Norway) Lillestrøm	0–3	0–1	0–4
2001–02	UEFA Cup	QR	(Denmark) Midtjylland	0–4	1–1	1–5
2002–03	UEFA Cup	QR	(Poland) Wisła Kraków	0–2	0–4	0–6
2003–04	UEFA Champions League	1QR	(Finland) HJK	0–0	0–1	0–1
2004–05	UEFA Cup	1QR	(Finland) Allianssi	2–2	2–1	4–3
2004–05	UEFA Cup	2QR	(Sweden) Elfsborg	0–1	1–2	1–3
2005–06	UEFA Champions League	1QR	(Republic of Ireland) Shelbourne	1–2	1–4	2–6
2006–07	UEFA Cup	1QR	(Norway) Brann	0–1	0–1	0–2
2007–08	UEFA Cup	1QR	(Sweden) AIK	0–5	0–4	0–9
2008–09	UEFA Cup	1QR	(Latvia) Liepājas Metalurgs	1–1	0–2	1–3
2009–10	UEFA Champions League	2QR	(Israel) Maccabi Haifa	0–4	0–6	0–10
2010–11	UEFA Europa League	1QR	(Iceland) KR Reykjavík	2–2	0–3	2–5
2011–12	UEFA Europa League	1QR	(North Macedonia) Renova	2–1 (a.e.t.)	1–2	3–3 (3–2 p)
2011–12	UEFA Europa League	2QR	(Ukraine) Vorskla Poltava	0–2	0–3	0–5
2013–14	UEFA Europa League	1QR	(Iceland) KR Reykjavík	0–3	0–0	0–3
2015–16	UEFA Europa League	1QR	(Slovakia) Žilina	1–4	0–3	1–7
2020–21	UEFA Europa League	PR	(Faroe Islands) HB Tórshavn	1–0	—N/a	—N/a
2020–21	UEFA Europa League	1QR	(Scotland) Motherwell	—N/a	1–5	—N/a
2021–22	UEFA Europa Conference League	1QR	(Wales) The New Saints	1–1	0–2	1–3
2023–24	UEFA Europa Conference League	1QR	(Malta) Gżira United	1–1 (a.e.t.)	2–2	3–3 (13–14 p)

=== UEFA ranking ===
As of 5 July 2024

Rank	Team	Points
339	(Belarus) Torpedo-BelAZ Zhodino	3.000
340	(Kosovo) Gjilani	3.000
341	(Northern Ireland) Glentoran	9.8000
342	(Republic of Ireland) Sligo Rovers	3.000
343	(Malta) Floriana	3.000

== Players ==
=== Current squad ===
Note: Flags indicate national team as defined under FIFA eligibility rules; some limited exceptions apply. Players may hold more than one non-FIFA nationality.

No.	Pos.	Nation	Player
1	GK	ENG	Andrew Mills
2	DF	ENG	Ryan Cooney
3	DF	NIR	Marcus Kane (captain)
4	DF	ENG	Zeno Ibsen Rossi
5	MF	NIR	Josh Kelly
7	FW	NIR	Ross Clarke
8	MF	IRL	Aaron McEneff
9	FW	IRL	Patrick Hoban
10	FW	NIR	Jordan Stewart
11	MF	IRL	Josh Daniels
12	MF	IRL	Greg Sloggett
16	DF	CAN	Ethan Schilte-Brown (On loan from Kilmarnock)
17	MF	SCO	Liam Burt
18	FW	NIR	Lekan Sule
19	FW	NIR	Ben Gallagher

No.	Pos.	Nation	Player
20	DF	NIR	Daniel Larmour
21	MF	NIR	Charlie Lindsay
24	FW	NIR	Conor McMenamin
26	DF	NIR	Jarlath O'Rourke
27	MF	NIR	James Singleton
29	MF	NIR	Jack Malone
30	FW	NIR	Jordan Jenkins
31	GK	ENG	Billy Crellin
35	FW	NIR	Cal Weatherup
38	MF	NIR	Jack Faloona
41	DF	NIR	Ciaran Rogers-Duffy
44	MF	NIR	James Douglas
47	FW	NIR	Casey Smyth
TBA	FW	ENG	Nathan Shaw

=== Out on loan ===
Note: Flags indicate national team as defined under FIFA eligibility rules; some limited exceptions apply. Players may hold more than one non-FIFA nationality.

No.	Pos.	Nation	Player
14	FW	NIR	Nathaniel Ferris (at Loughgall until 31 May 2027)
33	GK	NIR	Lorcan Donnelly (at Glenavon until 31 December 2026)
45	DF	NIR	Jude Johnson (at Glenavon until 31 December 2027)
—	FW	NIR	James McClure (at Ards until 31 May 2027)
—	FW	NIR	Rhys Walsh (at Annagh United until 31 May 2027)

=== Academy ===
Glentoran runs the Glentoran Academy, to help promote football to younger players. It is the fastest-growing football academy in the country and includes players, both boys and girls, from the age of 4. The academy also includes a disability section and a Polish language section, where playing for the team requires attendance at training and at English language classes. In 2015–16, the club had 44 players representing Northern Ireland at different age groups, twice as many as any other club. In the summer of 2016, 4 more players left the academy to take up places at English professional clubs' academies. The academy was set up in June 2008.

== Managerial history ==
See Category:Glentoran F.C. managers.

List only counts permanent managers.

- (England) Sam Jennings (1936–38)
- (England) Louis Page (1939–40)
- (Northern Ireland) Frank Thompson (1945–47)
- (England) Frank Grice (1948–55)
- (Scotland) Jimmy McIntosh (1955–57)
- (Scotland) Ken Chisholm (1958)
- (England) Tommy Briggs (1959–60)
- (Scotland) Alex Young (1968)
- (Northern Ireland) Peter McParland (1968–71)
- (Northern Ireland) Kieran Dowd (1971/72)
- (Scotland) Alex McCrae (1972)
- (England) George Eastham Sr. (1972–74)
- (Northern Ireland) Arthur Stewart (1977–78)
- (Northern Ireland) Ronnie McFall (1979–84)
- (Northern Ireland) Billy Johnston (1985–87)
- (Northern Ireland) Tommy Jackson (1987–93)
- (Northern Ireland) Robert Strain (1993/94)
- (Northern Ireland) Tommy Cassidy (1994–97)
- (Northern Ireland) Roy Coyle (1997–2006)
- (Northern Ireland) Paul Millar (2006–07)
- (Northern Ireland) Alan McDonald (2007–10)
- (Scotland) Scott Young (2010–12)
- (Northern Ireland) Eddie Patterson (26 February 2012 – 17 October 2015)
- (Republic of Ireland) Alan Kernaghan (9 November 2015 – 30 August 2016)
- (Northern Ireland) Gary Haveron (28 September 2016 – 21 February 2018)
- (Northern Ireland) Ronnie McFall (22 February 2018 – 3 January 2019)
- (Northern Ireland) Gary Smyth (3 January 2019 – 31 March 2019)
- (Northern Ireland) Mick McDermott (1 April 2019 – 17 January 2023)
- (Northern Ireland) Rodney McAree (17 January 2023 – 4 June 2023)
- (Northern Ireland) Warren Feeney (5 June 2023 – 15 March 2024)
- (Northern Ireland) Declan Devine (22 April 2024 –14 September 2026)
- (Scotland) Duncan Ferguson (19 October 2026-)

== Honours ==
=== Senior honours ===
- Irish League/Irish Premier League/IFA Premiership: 23
  - 1893–94, 1896–97, 1904–05, 1911–12, 1912–13, 1920–21, 1924–25, 1930–31, 1950–51, 1952–53, 1963–64, 1966–67, 1967–68, 1969–70, 1971–72, 1976–77, 1980–81, 1987–88, 1991–92, 1998–99, 2002–03, 2004–05, 2008–09
- Irish Cup: 23
  - 1913–14, 1916–17, 1920–21, 1931–32, 1932–33, 1934–35, 1950–51, 1965–66, 1972–73, 1982–83, 1984–85, 1985–86, 1986–87, 1987–88, 1989–90, 1995–96, 1997–98, 1999–2000, 2000–01, 2003–04, 2012–13, 2014–15, 2019–20
- Irish League Cup: 7
  - 1988–89, 1990–91, 2000–01, 2002–03, 2004–05, 2006–07, 2009–10
- County Antrim Shield: 27
  - 1900–01, 1901–02, 1910–11, 1915–16, 1917–18, 1920–21, 1924–25, 1930–31, 1939–40, 1940–41, 1943–44, 1949–50, 1951–52, 1956–57, 1967–68, 1970–71, 1977–78, 1984–85, 1986–87, 1989–90, 1998–99, 1999–2000, 2001–02, 2002–03, 2007–08, 2010–11, 2024–25
- Charity Shield: 2
  - 1992 (shared), 2015

Defunct competitions

- Gold Cup: 14
  - 1916–17, 1951–52, 1960–61, 1962–63, 1966–67, 1976–77, 1977–78, 1982–83, 1986–87, 1991–92, 1994–95, 1998–99, 1999–00, 2000–01
- City Cup: 15
  - 1896–97, 1898–99, 1910–11, 1911–12, 1913–14, 1914–15, 1931–32, 1950–51, 1952–53, 1956–57, 1964–65, 1966–67, 1969–70, 1972–73, 1974–75
- Ulster Cup: 9
  - 1950–51, 1952–53, 1966–67, 1976–77, 1981–82, 1982–83, 1983–84, 1988–89, 1989–90
- Belfast Charity Cup: 8
  - 1895–96, 1901–02, 1906–07, 1910–11, 1922–23, 1924–25, 1925–26 (shared), 1928–29 (shared)
- Floodlit Cup: 2
  - 1987–88, 1989–90
- County Antrim Centenary Chalice: 1
  - 1987–88
- Belfast City Cup: 3 (Note: A temporary competition set up to replace the City Cup while it was suspended during World War I.)
  - 1915–16, 1916–17, 1918–19 (shared)
- Substitute Gold Cup: 1 (Note: A temporary competition set up to replace the Gold Cup while it was suspended during World War II.)
  - 1941–42

=== All-Ireland honours ===
- Blaxnit Cup: 1
  - 1972–73
- Dublin and Belfast Inter-City Cup: 1
  - 1943–44

=== European honours ===
- Vienna Cup: 1
  - 1913–14

=== Intermediate honours ===
Honours won by Glentoran II

- County Antrim Shield: 1
  - 1908–09
- Irish League B Division: 1
  - 1958–59
- Irish Intermediate League: 4
  - 1915–16, 1918–19, 1919–20, 1929–30
- B Division Section 2/Reserve League: 9
  - 1985–86, 1986–87, 1989–90, 1992–93, 1995–96, 1997–98, 2001–02, 2002–03, 2025-26
- Irish Intermediate Cup: 9
  - 1893–94, 1897–98, 1908–09, 1912–13, 1915–16, 1917–18, 1930–31, 1940–41, 1961–62
- George Wilson Cup: 11
  - 1965–66, 1966–67, 1979–80, 1986–87, 2000–01, 2001–02, 2002–03, 2004–05, 2009–10, 2011–12, 2013–14
- Steel & Sons Cup: 13
  - 1904–05, 1908–09, 1910–11, 1914–15, 1918–19, 1932–33, 1937–38, 1957–58, 1965–66, 1966–67, 1989–90, 2000–01, 2001–02
- McElroy Cup: 4
  - 1915–16, 1917–18, 1933–34 (shared), 1938–39

=== Junior honours ===
Honours won by Glentoran II

- Irish Junior League: 6
  - 1896–97, 1897–98, 1901–02, 1904–05, 1908–09, 1909–10
- Irish Junior Cup: 1
  - 1889–90

== See also ==
- Glentoran Women
