= Stade communal de Namur =

Football stadium in Namur, Belgium

(Belgium) Stade communal de Namur
- Les Bas-Prés
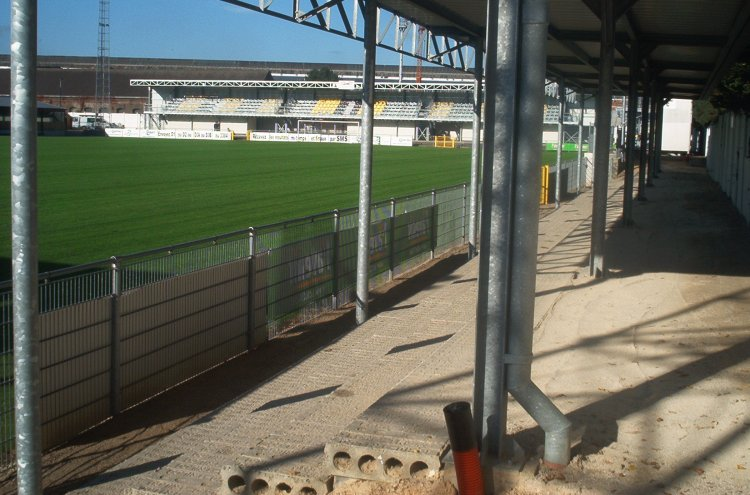
- Interactive map of (Belgium) Stade communal de Namur
- Former names: Stade des Bas-Prés
- Location: Namur, Belgium
- Coordinates: 50°28′06″N 4°50′57″E
- Owner: City of Namur
- Capacity: 3,500
- Surface: Grass
- Record attendance: 3,500 (UR Namur – KFCV Geel 10 June 2007)

Construction
- Renovated: 2001
- Expanded: 2006

Tenant
- Union Royale Namur

Website
- www.urnamur.be

The Stade Communal de Namur is a football stadium in Namur, Belgium. It is currently the home ground of Union Royale Namur. The stadium holds 3,500.
