= Davy Larmour (footballer) =

Northern Irish footballer

Personal information
- Full name: David James Larmour
- Date of birth: 23 August 1977 (age 49)
- Place of birth: Dundonald, Northern Ireland
- Height: 1.75 m (5 ft 9 in)
- Position: Striker

Youth career
- 1993: Dungoyne Boys
- 1993–1994: Bangor
- 1994–1995: Liverpool

Senior career*
Years	Team	Apps	(Gls)
1994–1996	Liverpool	0	(0)
1996–1997	Doncaster Rovers	20	(0)
1997–2006	Linfield	237	(94)
2006–2008	Crusaders	25	(14)
2008–2009	Glenavon	13	(1)
2009	Carrick Rangers		
2009–2011	Larne		
2011–2012	Lisburn Distillery		
2012–2013	Harland & Wolff Welders		
- * Club domestic league appearances and goals as of 30 May 2013

David James "Davy" Larmour (born 23 August 1977) is retired football player who played as a forward and is best known for his time at Linfield.

== Early career ==
He began his professional career with Liverpool, after trials with Crystal Palace and Rangers. In his debut for Liverpool reserves Larmour scored at the Kop end.

The following season, he helped Liverpool win the FA Youth Cup, beating a West Ham side containing Frank Lampard and Rio Ferdinand in the final. Larmour scored in the first leg but in the second he dropped out to make way for Michael Owen. He had been troubled by a thigh injury and was released at the end of the season without making a first-team appearance for Liverpool. When notified of his impending release some weeks earlier, Larmour rejected the chance to go to Sam Allardyce's Blackpool in order to play in the FA Youth Cup final.

== Doncaster and return to Northern Ireland ==
Larmour signed a two-year contract with Doncaster Rovers, but he registered only three starts, 19 substitute appearances and no goals. He departed when the club went into administration. After two months training with Macclesfield Town, Larmour returned to Northern Ireland and Linfield. He went on to enjoy a prolific spell at Windsor Park.

In August 2000, Larmour was called into the full Northern Ireland squad by Sammy McIlroy when Phil Gray withdrew with an injury. Larmour signed for Crusaders F.C. on a two-year deal after being released from Linfield in the summer of 2006.

After his contract expired at Crusaders in Summer 2008, Larmour joined Glenavon on an original six-month deal in order to prove his fitness following major knee surgery. After a drop down a division to sign for Carrick Rangers in January 2009, Larne F.C. manager Paul Millar signed Larmour in 2009.
