= Northern Ireland Football League =

Association football league in Northern Ireland

- Founded: 1890; 136 years ago (as Irish Football League)
- Country: Ireland (1890–1921); Northern Ireland (since 1921)
- Confederation: UEFA
- Divisions: NIFL Premiership; NIFL Championship; NIFL Premiership Development League; NIFL Youth League; NIFL Women’s Premiership
- Number of clubs: 38
- Level on pyramid: 1–3
- Relegation to: NCL Premier
- Domestic cup: Irish Cup
- League cup(s): Northern Ireland Football League Cup; George Wilson Cup
- International cup(s): UEFA Champions League; UEFA Europa Conference League; Scottish Challenge Cup
- Current champions: Larne (3rd title) (2025-26)
- Most championships: Linfield (57 titles)
- Broadcaster(s): BBC NI (highlights via BBC iPlayer) Sky Sports (5 games a season and League Cup Final)
- Website: www.nifootballleague.com
- Current: 2026–27

The Northern Ireland Football League (abbreviated to NIFL), formerly known as and still commonly referred to as the Irish League, is the national football league of Northern Ireland. The Irish League was originally formed in 1890, with the league in its current format managing the top two levels of the Northern Ireland football league system, the Premiership and the Championship.

In addition to the league divisions, the NIFL also operates the Northern Ireland Football League Cup for its member clubs, as well as the NIFL Development League and George Wilson Cup for their reserve teams, and the NIFL Youth League and NIFL Youth League Cup for their youth teams. Operated as a limited company, the 36 member clubs act as shareholders with one vote each. The NIFL is the successor to the Irish Football League, which, upon its formation in 1890, was historically the league for the entire island of Ireland until it became Northern Ireland's national league after the partition of Ireland in 1921.

Larne are the current holders having won their 3rd title in the 2025/26 season.

== History ==
=== Senior ===
Originally formed in 1890, the Irish Football League, is the second-oldest national league in the world, being formed a week earlier than the Scottish Football League. Only the English Football League is older. (The Dutch Football League formed properly on the same year as the Scottish and Irish leagues, making it the first league in Continental Europe. Although it did have two previous seasons, thus making it equal in duration with the EFL, these two seasons did not have an equal number of matches per club).

The Irish Football League was originally formed as the football league for, in theory, all of Ireland (although, for cultural reasons, all of its member clubs were in fact based in two zones: initially in what would become Northern Ireland, and, from 1900, in Dublin). It became the league for Northern Ireland in 1921 after partition, with a separate league and association (the Football Association of the Irish Free State – now called the Football Association of Ireland) – being formed for the Irish Free State (now the Republic of Ireland). The league's records from its days in operation as the league for all of Ireland stand as the records for Northern Ireland (as is the case for the Northern Ireland national football team).

In its first season, seven of the eight teams came from Belfast, and the league – and Irish football – continued to be dominated by Belfast clubs for many years. In 1892, Derry Olympic became the second non-Belfast side, but only lasted for one season. In 1900, Derry Celtic joined the league and, in 1901, a second Derry team, St Columb's Court, was added. St Columb's Court lasted just one season, before being replaced by the league's first Dublin team, Bohemians, in 1902. Another Dublin side, Shelbourne, was added in 1904. In 1911 Glenavon, from the County Armagh town of Lurgan replaced Bohemians, who resigned from the league, but were re-admitted in 1912. During 1912 there were three Dublin sides, with the addition of Tritonville, but, like Derry Olympic and St Columb's Court before them, they lasted just one season. Derry Celtic also dropped out in 1913, so that when the Irish League split in 1921, Glenavon was the only non-Belfast team left. No southern clubs (from what would become the Irish Free State and later the Republic of Ireland) ever won the championship. The highest place achieved by any of these clubs was second, by Shelbourne in 1906–07.

During the 1920s, however, the league expanded and soon achieved a wide geographic spread across Northern Ireland. Nonetheless, no club from outside Belfast won the League championship for the first 62 years of its existence, until Glenavon took it to County Armagh in 1951–52. In 1957–58, Ards became the first team from County Down to win the League, and in 1964–65, Derry City were the first County Londonderry club to do so. Derry City – now of the League of Ireland – played in the Irish League from 1929 until 1972 and won the title in 1965, but eventually resigned during the Troubles after the League voted narrowly to continue a ban on their home ground imposed by the security forces, even after the security forces had lifted it.

Historically, with relatively few league fixtures each season, the Irish League organised a number of other competitions for its members. While some of these once enjoyed considerable prestige, they have been phased out over the years due to fixture congestion caused by the expansion of the league, and reduced spectator interest. These competitions were: the City Cup; the Gold Cup; the Ulster Cup and the Irish League Floodlit Cup. In addition, clubs still compete in their respective regional cup competitions: the County Antrim Shield (for clubs within the jurisdiction of the North-East Ulster F.A., also known as the County Antrim & District F.A.); the Mid-Ulster Cup (for clubs within the jurisdiction of the Mid-Ulster F.A.); and the North West Senior Cup (for clubs within the jurisdiction of the North-Western F.A.).

From 1995–96 until 2002–03, the senior League was split into two divisions: the Premier Division and First Division. From 2003-16, there was a single division, albeit with relegation to intermediate leagues below, and from 2016 there are two senior divisions (Premiership and Championship). In 2003, the Irish Football Association took direct charge of Northern Ireland's top flight with the creation of the Irish Premier League (IPL). As in England and Scotland, the old Irish Football League retained a separate existence, but controlling only two feeder leagues: the First Division and Second Division. In 2004, the IFA took over control of the remaining IFL divisions and renamed them as the IFA Intermediate League First Division and Second Division, effectively winding up the Irish Football League after 114 years.

The first ever Irish League match to be broadcast live on television took place on 24 September 2007 when Sky Sports showed Cliftonville and Linfield draw 2–2 at Solitude. In 2008, the IFA took over responsibility for the Senior League under the name IFA Premiership, and the IFA Intermediate League was replaced by the IFA Championship. After five years under the auspices of the IFA, it was decided to create a single Northern Ireland Football League to assume responsibility for all the national leagues from the 2013–14 season.

=== Intermediate ===
The NIFL Premier Intermediate League, as the highest-level of intermediate football in Northern Ireland, is the successor to the intermediate-status IFA Championship (2008-16), IFA Intermediate League (2004-08), the Irish Football League First Division (2003-04) during its last season (when it had intermediate status), and ultimately the Irish League B Division (latterly known as the Irish League Second Division).

The B Division of the Irish League was founded in 1951, and originally consisted of the reserve teams of the senior Irish League clubs alongside some of the top intermediate clubs. The B Division was split geographically into North and South sections in 1974 (with a play-off to determine the winners in 1974–75 and 1975–76), and then into Section 1 (containing the intermediate clubs) and Section 2 (the reserve teams of senior clubs) in 1977.

In 1999, the B Division Section 1 was renamed as the Irish League Second Division, and Section 2 became the Reserve League.

There was never any automatic promotion and relegation between either the B Division or Second Division and the senior Irish League.

In 2003, the Irish Premier League was formed by the top sixteen senior teams in the senior Irish League (which, since 1995 had been divided into a Premier Division and a First Division). The four remaining senior teams reverted to intermediate football, along with the top eight teams from the previous year's Second Division - in the Irish League First Division (which now became the top intermediate league), with the Second Division continuing with twelve teams. Automatic promotion and relegation between senior and intermediate football was introduced. There was also automatic promotion and relegation between the two divisions of the (now intermediate-status) Irish League.

In 2004, the Irish Football League was wound up and replaced by the IFA Intermediate League, consisting of two divisions of twelve, with promotion and relegation between the two. This continued for four seasons, until the Championship was created.

For one season only, 2008–09, there was also an IFA Interim Intermediate League for those former members of the IFA Intermediate League which had failed to meet the criteria for the Championship. These clubs were given a year to make improvements in order to join the Championship for 2009–10. Ten of the 12 clubs succeeded in meeting the necessary standard in 2009 and the Championship was then divided into two divisions.

In 2010–11, a pyramid system was introduced, with the possibility of promotion and relegation between Championship 2 and the four regional intermediate leagues, namely the:

- Ballymena & Provincial League
- Mid-Ulster Football League
- Northern Amateur Football League
- Northern Ireland Intermediate League (ended in 2023)

Clubs in these leagues may only gain promotion to the Championship if they win their respective league championship and meet the necessary criteria. In the event that more than one league champion meets the criteria, only one will be promoted, to be decided by a play-off or series of play-offs. In 2023 the Northern Ireland Intermediate League announced that it would cease to exist due to a number of clubs deciding to join other regional leagues within the league system, thus leaving three regional leagues below the Premier Intermediate League.

In 2013, the Northern Ireland Football League assumed responsibility from the IFA for the Championship, which became two intermediate divisions of the NIFL and was renamed as the NIFL Championship. In 2016, Championship 1 acquired senior status and Championship 2 was renamed as the NIFL Premier Intermediate League, thus succeeding the Championship as the top intermediate league in Northern Ireland. In 2026, the Premier Intermediate League was replaced by the National Conference League (NCL) which is run by the Northern Amateur Football League. The top division, NCL Premier, was launched with the 2026–27 season as the third tier of the national football system. Two more divisions, NCL League One and League Two, are planned to be launched in August 2027 as the third and the fourth tiers.

== 2024-25 membership ==
Listed below are the 38 member clubs for the 2024–25 season.

Senior (24 clubs)		Intermediate (14 clubs)
NIFL Premiership	NIFL Championship	NIFL Premier Intermediate League
Ballymena United	Armagh City	Ballymacash Rangers
Carrick Rangers	Annagh	Banbridge Town
Cliftonville	Ards	Coagh United
Coleraine	Ballinamallard	Dollingstown
Crusaders	Ballyclare Comrades	Dergview
Dungannon Swifts	Bangor	Knockbreda
Glenavon	Dundela	Lisburn Distillery
Glentoran	Harland & Wolff Welders	Moyola Park
Larne	Institute	Oxford Sunnyside
Linfield	Limavady United	Portstewart
Loughgall	Newington	Queen's University
Portadown	Newry City	Rathfriland Rangers
—	—	Tobermore United
—	—	Warrenpoint Town

== UEFA coefficient and ranking ==
Country coefficient for 2024–25:

- 40 Faroe Islands 10.750
- 41 Malta 8.500
- 42 Northern Ireland 8.333
- 43 Lithuania 8.250
- 44 Liechtenstein 8.000
  - Full list

== Senior ==
=== List of champions and runners-up ===
- **Bold** indicates team achieved a Double – winners of league and Irish Cup
- **Bold italic** indicates team achieved a Treble – winners of league, Irish Cup and at least one other national trophy

==== Irish Football League (1890–1995) ====
#	Season	Senior champions (number of senior titles)	Runners-up	Third	Leading goalscorer	Goals
1	1890–91	**Linfield** (1)	Ulster	Distillery	Robert Hill (Linfield)	20
2	1891–92	**Linfield** (2)	Ulster	Lancashire Fusiliers	Tim Morrison (Linfield)	21
3	1892–93	**Linfield** (3)	Cliftonville	Distillery	Robert Hill (Linfield); James Percy (Cliftonville)	9
4	1893–94	Glentoran (1)	Linfield	Cliftonville	Michael McErlean (Linfield)	9
5	1894–95	**Linfield** (4)	Distillery	Glentoran	George Gaukrodger (Linfield); Joe McAllen (Linfield)	4
6	1895–96	**Distillery** (1)	Cliftonville	Linfield		
7	1896–97	Glentoran (2)	Cliftonville	Linfield	Johnny Darling (Linfield); Richard Peden (Linfield)	6
8	1897–98	**Linfield** (5)	Cliftonville	Glentoran		
9	1898–99	Distillery (2)	Linfield	Cliftonville		
10	1899–1900	Celtic (1)	Linfield	Distillery		
11	1900–01	Distillery (3)	Glentoran	Belfast Celtic		
12	1901–02	**Linfield** (6)	Glentoran	Distillery		
13	1902–03	Distillery (4)	Linfield	Glentoran		
14	1903–04	**Linfield** (7)	Distillery	Glentoran		
15	1904–05	Glentoran (3)	Belfast Celtic	Linfield		
16	1905–06	Cliftonville (1) / Distillery (5) (Note: The 1905–06 league title was shared when Cliftonville and Distillery could not be separated after two play-off matches – the only season in the Irish League's history in which the title has been shared.)		Linfield		
17	1906–07	Linfield (8)	Shelbourne	Distillery		
18	1907–08	Linfield (9)	Cliftonville	Glentoran		
19	1908–09	Linfield (10)	Glentoran	Shelbourne		
20	1909–10	Cliftonville (2) (Note: Including one shared title)	Belfast Celtic	Linfield		
21	1910–11	Linfield (11)	Glentoran	Belfast Celtic		
22	1911–12	Glentoran (4)	Distillery	Belfast Celtic		
23	1912–13	Glentoran (5)	Distillery	Linfield		
24	1913–14	Linfield (12)	Glentoran	Belfast Celtic		
25	1914–15	Belfast Celtic (2)	Glentoran	Linfield		
1915–19		League suspended due to the First World War: Belfast & District League played instead				
26	1919–20	Belfast Celtic (3)	Distillery	Glentoran		
27	1920–21	**Glentoran** (6)	Glenavon	Linfield		
28	1921–22	**Linfield** (13)	Glentoran	Distillery		
29	1922–23	**Linfield** (14)	Queen's Island	Glentoran		
30	1923–24	**Queen's Island** (1)	Distillery	Linfield		
31	1924–25	Glentoran (7)	Queen's Island	Belfast Celtic		
32	1925–26	**Belfast Celtic** (4)	Glentoran	Larne		
33	1926–27	Belfast Celtic (5)	Queen's Island	Distillery	Joe Bambrick (Glentoran)	28
34	1927–28	Belfast Celtic (6)	Linfield	Newry Town		
35	1928–29	Belfast Celtic (7)	Linfield	Glentoran	Joe Bambrick (Linfield)	43
36	1929–30	**Linfield** (15)	Glentoran	Coleraine	Joe Bambrick (Linfield)	50
37	1930–31	Glentoran (8)	Linfield	Belfast Celtic	Fred Roberts (Glentoran)	55
38	1931–32	Linfield (16)	Derry City	Belfast Celtic		
39	1932–33	Belfast Celtic (8)	Distillery	Linfield	Joe Bambrick (Linfield)	40
40	1933–34	**Linfield** (17)	Belfast Celtic	Glentoran		
41	1934–35	Linfield (18)	Derry City	Belfast Celtic		
42	1935–36	Belfast Celtic (9)	Derry City	Linfield		
43	1936–37	**Belfast Celtic** (10)	Derry City	Linfield		
44	1937–38	**Belfast Celtic** (11)	Derry City	Portadown		
45	1938–39	Belfast Celtic (12)	Ballymena United	Derry City		
46	1939–40	Belfast Celtic (13)	Portadown	Glentoran		
1940–47		League suspended due to the Second World War: Northern Regional League played instead				
47	1947–48	Belfast Celtic (14)	Linfield	Ballymena United	Jimmy Jones (Belfast Celtic)	28
48	1948–49	Linfield (19)	Belfast Celtic	Glentoran	Billy Simpson (Linfield)	19
49	1949–50	**Linfield** (20)	Glentoran	Distillery	Sammy Hughes (Glentoran)	23
50	1950–51	**Glentoran** (9)	Linfield	Glenavon	Sammy Hughes (Glentoran); Walter Allen (Portadown)	23
51	1951–52	Glenavon (1)	Distillery	Coleraine	Jimmy Jones (Glenavon)	27
52	1952–53	Glentoran (10)	Linfield	Ballymena United	Sammy Hughes (Glentoran)	28
53	1953–54	Linfield (21)	Glentoran	Glenavon	Jimmy Jones (Glenavon)	32
54	1954–55	Linfield (22)	Glenavon	Cliftonville	Fay Coyle (Coleraine)	20
55	1955–56	Linfield (23)	Glenavon	Bangor	Jimmy Jones (Glenavon)	26
56	1956–57	**Glenavon** (2)	Linfield	Glentoran	Jimmy Jones (Glenavon)	33
57	1957–58	Ards (1)	Glenavon	Ballymena United	Jackie Milburn (Linfield)	29
58	1958–59	Linfield (24)	Glenavon	Glentoran	Jackie Milburn (Linfield)	26
59	1959–60	Glenavon (3)	Glentoran	Distillery	Jimmy Jones (Glenavon)	29
60	1960–61	Linfield (25)	Portadown	Ards	Trevor Thompson (Glentoran)	22
61	1961–62	**Linfield** (26)	Portadown	Ballymena United	Mick Lynch (Ards)	20
62	1962–63	Distillery (6)	Linfield	Portadown	Joe Meldrum (Distillery)	27
63	1963–64	Glentoran (11)	Coleraine	Derry City	Trevor Thompson (Linfield)	21
64	1964–65	Derry City (1)	Coleraine	Crusaders	Kenny Halliday (Coleraine); Dennis Guy (Glenavon)	19
65	1965–66	Linfield (27)	Derry City	Glentoran	Sammy Pavis (Linfield)	28
66	1966–67	Glentoran (12)	Linfield	Derry City	Sammy Pavis (Linfield)	25
67	1967–68	Glentoran (13)	Linfield	Coleraine	Sammy Pavis (Linfield)	30
68	1968–69	Linfield (28)	Derry City	Coleraine	Danny Hale (Derry City)	21
69	1969–70	Glentoran (14)	Coleraine	Ards	Des Dickson (Coleraine)	21
70	1970–71	Linfield (29)	Glentoran	Distillery	Bryan Hamilton (Linfield)	18
71	1971–72	Glentoran (15)	Portadown	Ards	Peter Watson (Distillery); Des Dickson (Coleraine)	15
72	1972–73	Crusaders (1)	Ards	Portadown	Des Dickson (Coleraine)	23
73	1973–74	Coleraine (1)	Portadown	Crusaders	Des Dickson (Coleraine)	24
74	1974–75	Linfield (30)	Coleraine	Glentoran	Martin Malone (Portadown)	15
75	1975–76	Crusaders (2)	Glentoran	Coleraine	Des Dickson (Coleraine)	23
76	1976–77	Glentoran (16)	Glenavon	Linfield	Ronnie McAteer (Crusaders)	20
77	1977–78	Linfield (31)	Glentoran	Glenavon	Warren Feeney (Glentoran)	17
78	1978–79	Linfield (32)	Glenavon	Ards	Tommy Armstrong (Ards)	21
79	1979–80	**Linfield** (33)	Ballymena United	Glentoran	Jimmy Martin (Glentoran)	17
80	1980–81	Glentoran (17)	Linfield	Ballymena United	Des Dickson (Coleraine); Paul Malone (Ballymena United)	18
81	1981–82	**Linfield** (34)	Glentoran	Coleraine	Gary Blackledge (Glentoran)	18
82	1982–83	Linfield (35)	Glentoran	Coleraine	Jim Campbell (Ards)	15
83	1983–84	Linfield (36)	Glentoran	Cliftonville	Martin McGaughey (Linfield); Trevor Anderson (Linfield)	15
84	1984–85	Linfield (37)	Coleraine	Glentoran	Martin McGaughey (Linfield)	34
85	1985–86	Linfield (38)	Coleraine	Ards	Trevor Anderson (Linfield)	14
86	1986–87	Linfield (39)	Coleraine	Ards	Ray McCoy (Coleraine); Gary Macartney (Glentoran)	14
87	1987–88	**Glentoran** (18)	Linfield	Coleraine	Martin McGaughey (Linfield)	18
88	1988–89	Linfield (40)	Glentoran	Coleraine	Stephen Baxter (Linfield)	17
89	1989–90	Portadown (1)	Glenavon	Glentoran	Martin McGaughey (Linfield)	19
90	1990–91	**Portadown** (2)	Bangor	Glentoran	Stephen McBride (Glenavon)	22
91	1991–92	Glentoran (19)	Portadown	Linfield	Harry McCourt (Omagh Town); Stephen McBride (Glenavon)	18
92	1992–93	Linfield (41)	Crusaders	Bangor	Steve Cowan (Portadown)	23
93	1993–94	**Linfield** (42)	Portadown	Glenavon	Darren Erskine (Ards); Stephen McBride (Glenavon)	22
94	1994–95	Crusaders (3)	Glenavon	Portadown	Glenn Ferguson (Glenavon)	27

==== Irish Football League Premier & First Division (1995–2003) ====
#	Season	Senior champions (number of senior titles)	Runners-up	Third	Leading goalscorer	Goals	Second-level senior champions (number of second-level senior titles)	Runners-up	Third
95	1995–96	Portadown (3)	Crusaders	Glentoran	Garry Haylock (Portadown)	19	Coleraine (1)	Ballymena United	Omagh Town
96	1996–97	Crusaders (4)	Coleraine	Glentoran	Garry Haylock (Portadown)	16	Ballymena United (1)	Omagh Town	Bangor
97	1997–98	Cliftonville (3)	Linfield	Portadown	Vinny Arkins (Portadown)	22	Newry Town (1)	Bangor	Distillery
98	1998–99	Glentoran (20)	Linfield	Crusaders	Vinny Arkins (Portadown)	19	Distillery (1)	Ards	Bangor
99	1999–2000	Linfield (43)	Coleraine	Glenavon	Vinny Arkins (Portadown)	29	Omagh Town (1)	Ards	Limavady United
100	2000–01	Linfield (44)	Glenavon	Glentoran	Davy Larmour (Linfield)	17	Ards (1)	Lisburn Distillery	Armagh City
101	2001–02	Portadown (4)	Glentoran	Linfield	Vinny Arkins (Portadown)	30	Lisburn Distillery (2)	Institute	Dungannon Swifts
102	2002–03	Glentoran (21)	Portadown	Coleraine	Vinny Arkins (Portadown)	29	Dungannon Swifts (1)	Ballymena United	Limavady United

==== Irish Premier League (2003–2008) ====
#	Season	Senior champions (number of senior titles)	Runners-up	Third	Leading goalscorer	Goals
103	2003–04	Linfield (45)	Portadown	Lisburn Distillery	Glenn Ferguson (Linfield)	25
104	2004–05	Glentoran (22)	Linfield	Portadown	Chris Morgan (Glentoran)	19
105	2005–06	**Linfield** (46)	Glentoran	Portadown	Peter Thompson (Linfield)	25
106	2006–07	**Linfield** (47)	Glentoran	Cliftonville	Gary Hamilton (Glentoran)	27
107	2007–08	**Linfield** (48)	Glentoran	Cliftonville	Peter Thompson (Linfield)	29

==== IFA Premiership (2008–2013) ====
#	Season	Senior champions (number of senior titles)	Runners-up	Third	Leading goalscorer	Goals
108	2008–09	Glentoran (23)	Linfield	Crusaders	Curtis Allen (Lisburn Distillery)	19
109	2009–10	**Linfield** (49)	Cliftonville	Glentoran	Rory Patterson (Coleraine)	30
110	2010–11	**Linfield** (50)	Crusaders	Glentoran	Peter Thompson (Linfield)	23
111	2011–12	**Linfield** (51)	Portadown	Cliftonville	Gary McCutcheon (Ballymena United)	27
112	2012–13	Cliftonville (4)	Crusaders	Linfield	Liam Boyce (Cliftonville)	29

==== NIFL Premiership (2013–2016) ====
#	Season	Senior champions (number of senior titles)	Runners-up	Third	Leading goalscorer	Goals
113	2013–14	Cliftonville (5)	Linfield	Crusaders	Joe Gormley (Cliftonville)	27
114	2014–15	Crusaders (5)	Linfield	Glenavon	Joe Gormley (Cliftonville)	31
115	2015–16	Crusaders (6)	Linfield	Glenavon	Paul Heatley (Crusaders); Andrew Waterworth (Linfield)	22

==== NIFL Premiership & Championship (2016–) ====
#	Season	Senior champions (number of senior titles)	Runners-up	Third	Leading goalscorer	Goals	Season	Second-level senior champions (number of second-level senior titles)	Runners-up	Third
116	2016–17	**Linfield** (52)	Crusaders	Coleraine	Andrew Mitchell (Dungannon Swifts)	25	2016–17	Warrenpoint Town (1)	Institute	Ballyclare Comrades
117	2017–18	Crusaders (7)	Coleraine	Glenavon	Joe Gormley (Cliftonville)	22	2017–18	Institute (1)	Newry City AFC	Harland & Wolff Welders
118	2018–19	Linfield (53)	Ballymena United	Glenavon	Joe Gormley (Cliftonville)	20	2018–19	Larne (1)	Carrick Rangers	Portadown
119	2019–20	Linfield (54) (Note: Champions declared on average points per game after the season was curtailed as a result of the COVID-19 pandemic.)	Coleraine	Crusaders	Joe Gormley (Cliftonville)	18	2019–20	Portadown (1)	Ballinamallard United	Loughgall
120	2020–21	**Linfield** (55)	Coleraine	Glentoran	Shayne Lavery (Linfield)	23	2020–21	Season cancelled due to the COVID-19 pandemic in Northern Ireland		
121	2021–22	Linfield (56)	Cliftonville	Glentoran	Jay Donnelly (Glentoran)	25	2021–22	Newry City AFC (1)	Annagh United	Loughgall
122	2022–23	Larne (1)	Linfield	Glentoran	Matthew Shevlin (Coleraine)	21	2022–23	Loughgall (1)	Warrenpoint Town	Annagh United
123	2023–24	Larne (2)	Linfield	Cliftonville	Andy Ryan (Larne)	24	2023–24	Portadown (2)	Institute	Bangor
124	2024–25	Linfield (57)	Larne	Glentoran	Joe Gormley (Cliftonville) Matthew Shevlin (Coleraine)	20	2024–25	Bangor (1)	Annagh United	Limavady United
125	2025–26	Larne (3)	Coleraine	Glentoran	Patrick Hoban (Glentoran)	26	2025–26	Limavady United (1)	Annagh United	Harland & Wolff Welders

=== Summary of champions ===
==== Performance by club ====
Clubs in italics either no longer exist (Belfast Celtic, Queen's Island) or no longer compete for the title (Derry City).

Club	Winners	Runners-up	Winning seasons
Linfield	57	24	1890–91, 1891–92, 1892–93, 1894–95, 1897–98, 1901–02, 1903–04, 1906–07, 1907–08, 1908–09, 1910–11, 1913–14, 1921–22, 1922–23, 1929–30, 1931–32, 1933–34, 1934–35, 1948–49, 1949–50, 1953–54, 1954–55, 1955–56, 1958–59, 1960–61, 1961–62, 1965–66, 1968–69, 1970–71, 1974–75, 1977–78, 1978–79, 1979–80, 1981–82, 1982–83, 1983–84, 1984–85, 1985–86, 1986–87, 1988–89, 1992–93, 1993–94, 1999–2000, 2000–01, 2003–04, 2005–06, 2006–07, 2007–08, 2009–10, 2010–11, 2011–12, 2016–17, 2018–19, 2019–20, 2020–21, 2021–22, 2024–25
Glentoran	23	23	1893–94, 1896–97, 1904–05, 1911–12, 1912–13, 1920–21, 1924–25, 1930–31, 1950–51, 1952–53, 1963–64, 1966–67, 1967–68, 1969–70, 1971–72, 1976–77, 1980–81, 1987–88, 1991–92, 1998–99, 2002–03, 2004–05, 2008–09
Belfast Celtic	14	4	1899–1900, 1914–15, 1919–20, 1925–26, 1926–27, 1927–28, 1928–29, 1932–33, 1935–36, 1936–37, 1937–38, 1938–39, 1939–40, 1947–48
Crusaders	7	5	1972–73, 1975–76, 1994–95, 1996–97, 2014–15, 2015–16, 2017–18
Distillery	6	8	1895–96, 1898–99, 1900–01, 1902–03, 1905–06, 1962–63
Cliftonville	5	7	1905–06, 1909–10, 1997–98, 2012–13, 2013–14
Portadown	4	10	1989–90, 1990–91, 1995–96, 2001–02
Glenavon	3	10	1951–52, 1956–57, 1959–60
Larne	3	1	2022–23, 2023–24, 2025–26
Coleraine	1	13	1973–74
Derry City	1	7	1964–65
Queen's Island	1	3	1923–24
Ards	1	1	1957–58

=== Records ===
The first Irish League champions were Linfield, and the first runners-up were Ulster. Of the 124 completed championships, the title has only been taken out of Belfast on twelve occasions. The last club to do so was Larne in 2023–24 season, 21 years since Portadown did so in the 2001-02 season.

In 1921–22, Linfield famously achieved the feat of winning seven trophies; the Irish League, Irish Cup; City Cup, Gold Cup; County Antrim Shield; Belfast Charities Cup and Alhambra Cup. In 1961–62, the club achieved a similar feat, winning six trophies; the Irish League; Irish Cup; City Cup, Gold Cup; Ulster Cup and County Antrim Shield. They also lifted the North-South Cup as a seventh trophy, however that was actually the conclusion of the 1960–61 competition, as fixture congestion meant that the cup could not be completed before the end of the previous season.

The record for consecutive league titles is six, which has been achieved by two clubs. Belfast Celtic won five consecutive titles between 1935–36 and 1939–40, before the suspension of the league in 1940 due to World War II. On the resumption of the league in 1947–48 they won their sixth consecutive title, albeit eight years after the fifth. Linfield are the only club to achieve six consecutive titles without a hiatus, from 1981–82 to 1986–87. The longest gap between title wins is the 88 years separating Cliftonville's wins in 1909–10 and 1997–98. A total of 12 different clubs have won the championship, Linfield holding the record for the most wins (56).

==== Tiebreakers ====
In the 1905–06 season, the championship title was shared after Cliftonville and Distillery could not be separated after two play-off matches. This is the only occasion in the league's history that the title has been shared. Using the modern award of 3 points for a win, Distillery would have been crowned champions by one point. However, if goal difference had been used instead, Cliftonville would have won the title with a goal difference of +9 compared to Distillery's +7. In the 1992–93 season, Linfield became the first club to win the championship on goal difference, when they finished level on 66 points with Crusaders, but eight goals better with a +34 goal difference to Crusaders' +26.

Before goal difference was introduced, if the top two teams finished the season with the same number of points, the championship title was decided by a play-off. Nine such championship play-offs took place over the years as follows:

Season	Winners	Score	Runners-up
1895–96	Distillery	2–1	Cliftonville
1898–99	Distillery	2–0	Linfield
1904–05	Glentoran	3–1	Belfast Celtic
1905–06	Cliftonville	0–0	Distillery
Replay	Cliftonville	3–3	Distillery
1910–11	Linfield	3–2	Glentoran
1937–38	Belfast Celtic	2–2	Derry City
Replay	Belfast Celtic	3–1	Derry City
1949–50	Linfield	2–0	Glentoran
1960–61	Linfield	2–0	Portadown
1961–62	Linfield	3–1	Portadown

==== Unbeaten seasons ====
On seven occasions, a team has completed a league campaign unbeaten. Linfield have done so four times, but with fewer fixtures relative to Belfast Celtic's unbeaten seasons in 1926–27 and 1928–29. Glentoran were the last club to finish an entire league season unbeaten, when they won the 1980–81 Irish League title by two points after completing 22 league games without defeat. They again came close in the 1991–92 Irish League season, losing only once in 30 league games. Linfield also came close in the 2003–04 Irish Premier League season, when they too lost just one league game all season. Across the 2005–06 and 2006–07 seasons, Linfield lost just two out of 60 league games in two seasons - one in each season. Coleraine also came close in the 2017–18 season, losing just once in 38 league games.

Season	Club	Matches played	Wins	Draws
1892–93	Linfield	10	8	2
1894–95	Linfield	6	4	2
1903–04	Linfield	14	12	2
1921–22	Linfield	10	7	3
1926–27	Belfast Celtic	22	15	7
1928–29	Belfast Celtic	26	22	4
1980–81	Glentoran	22	15	7

=== Senior club membership history ===
A total of 46 different clubs have been members of the senior league since its inception - ten of which have been members for only one season. The newest members are Warrenpoint Town, who joined the league in 2013 for the first time. That was the second consecutive season that a new member club had made its first appearance in the league, following Ballinamallard United's debut a year earlier in 2012. Three clubs – Cliftonville, Glentoran and Linfield – have retained unbroken membership since 1890: 130 years and 119 seasons (due to eleven suspended seasons).

In 1891, the league expanded to ten clubs, but shrank again after only one season to six clubs for the 1892–93 season. Only four clubs competed in 1892–93 and 1893–94, then six clubs for the following season, until a membership of eight was achieved for the 1901–02 season. With the exception of one season (1912–13) in which there were ten clubs, membership stayed at eight until the southern clubs resigned in 1920, anticipating the formation of the separate League of Ireland in what would become the Irish Free State. (The League was suspended from 1915 to 1919 because of the First World War.) Prior to the split, three southern clubs had participated in the League: Bohemians, Shelbourne and Tritonville. In the early years, Army regiments stationed in Ireland had also participated in the League: the Lancashire Fusiliers in 1891–92; the North Staffordshire Regiment for three seasons from 1896–99; the Royal Scots in 1899–1900 and the King's Own Scottish Borderers in 1903–04.

Only five and six clubs competed in 1920–21 and from 1921 to 1923 respectively, but expansion began with the admission of four new clubs in 1923, another two in 1924 and a further two in 1927, giving a membership of fourteen from 1927 until the League was suspended in 1940 because of the Second World War. When the League resumed in 1947 it was reduced to twelve clubs, and stayed at this number until 1983 when membership was increased to fourteen.

In 1990, a further two clubs brought the membership to sixteen, and the League was divided into two divisions (the Premier and First Divisions) of eight in 1995, with promotion and relegation between the two. In 1996 the results from the Premier Division and the First Division started to be featured on the Press Association vidiprinter. In 1997, membership increased again to eighteen, with ten in the Premier Division and eight in the First Division. Between 1999 and 2003, the League had a record twenty clubs in membership. From 1999 to 2002, ten clubs each competed in the Premier and First Divisions and in 2002–03 there were twelve in the Premier Division and eight in the First Division.

In 2003, with the creation of the Irish Premier League, the senior league was reduced to a single division of sixteen clubs, although for the first time with relegation to, and promotion from, a league below (a rump Irish Football League in 2003–04 and subsequently the IFA Intermediate League). In 2008, with the creation of the IFA Premiership, the league was reduced to twelve. The Northern Ireland Football League was formed in 2013 to assume independent collective management of the top three levels of the Northern Ireland football league system, which had been under the direct management of the Irish Football Association: namely the IFA Premiership and both divisions of the IFA Championship.

In 2016, the NIFL Championship was given senior status.

==== Membership summary ====
Listed below are all the senior League members from 1890 up to and including the 2026–27 season in the following competitions (except Ballaclare & QUB pending PO results):

- Irish Football League (1890–1995)
- Irish Football League Premier and First Divisions (1995–2003)
- Irish Premier League (2003–2008)
- IFA Premiership (2008–2013)
- NIFL Premiership (2013–2016)
- NIFL Premiership & Championship (2016–present)

Club	Location	No. seasons in league	Membership years
**Cliftonville**	Belfast	126	1890–
**Glentoran**	Belfast	126	1890–
**Linfield**	Belfast	126	1890–
Lisburn Distillery (Note: Changed name from Distillery to Lisburn Distillery in 1999.)	Ballyskeagh (Note: Moved from Belfast to Ballyskeagh in 1980.)	112	1890–2013
**Glenavon**	Lurgan	104	1911–2004, 2005–
**Portadown**	Portadown	95	1924–2008, 2009–
**Coleraine**	Coleraine	93	1927–
**Ards**	Newtownards (Note: Sold home ground in Newtownards in 2002, and has subsequently played in Carrickfergus, Belfast and Bangor.)	88	1923–2006, 2013–2014, 2016–
**Ballymena United** (Note: Ballymena United F.C. were formed immediately after Ballymena F.C. dissolved in 1934, following expulsion from the league. Generally, Ballymena United assume the history of the previous club, however technically they were two different entities.)	Ballymena	86	1934–
**Crusaders**	Belfast	77	1949–2005, 2006–
**Bangor**	Bangor	74	1927–2003, 2008–2009 2023-
**Larne**	Larne	64	1923–1940, 1972–2008, 2016–
Newry City (Note: Changed name from Newry Town to Newry City in 2004, and was dissolved in 2012 following financial problems.)	Newry	45	1923–1940, 1983–2011
Belfast Celtic (Note: Changed name from Celtic to Belfast Celtic in 1901. Club was dissolved in 1949.)	Belfast	38	1896–1920, 1924–1949
Derry City	Derry	36	1929–1972
**Carrick Rangers**	Carrickfergus	33	1983–2003, 2011–2012, 2015–
**Dungannon Swifts**	Dungannon	30	1997–
Ballyclare Comrades	Ballyclare	21	1990–2003, 2016–2025
**Institute**	Drumahoe	22	1999–2006, 2007–2010, 2014–2015, 2016–
Omagh Town	Omagh	16	1990–2005
**Limavady United**	Limavady	16	1997–2008, 2017–2019 2024-
**Ballinamallard United**	Ballinamallard	15	2012–
Bohemians	Dublin	13	1902–1911, 1912–1920
Derry Celtic	Derry	13	1900–1913
**Loughgall**	Loughgall	14	2004–2007, 2016–
Shelbourne	Dublin	12	1904–1920
**Warrenpoint Town**	Warrenpoint	12	2013–2023 2025-
**Armagh City**	Armagh	11	1999–2003, 2005–2008, 2016–2017 2024-
**Harland & Wolff Welders**	Belfast	11	2016–
**Dundela**	Belfast	9	2018–
**Newry City AFC**	Newry	9	2017–2025, 2026-
**Annagh United**	Portadown	8	2016–2017, 2020–
Dergview	Castlederg	8	2016–2024
Knockbreda	Belfast	8	2016–2024
Queen's Island	Belfast	8	1921–1929
Ballymena	Ballymena	6	1928–1934
Ulster	Belfast	6	1890–1894, 1901–1903
Barn	Carrickfergus	5	1923–1928
Donegal Celtic	Belfast	5	2006–2008, 2010–2013
**Newington**	Belfast	5	2022–
PSNI	Belfast	5	2016–2020 2023-2024
**Queen's University**	Belfast	5	2019–22, 2025-
North Staffordshire Regiment	Army team	3	1896–1899
Ligoniel	Belfast	2	1891–1892, 1893–1894
Lurgan Celtic	Lurgan	2	2016–2018
Oldpark	Belfast	2	1890–1892
Clarence	Belfast	1	1890–1891
Derry Olympic	Derry	1	1892–1893
King's Own Scottish Borderers	Army team	1	1903–1904
Lancashire Fusiliers	Army team	1	1891–1892
Milford	Milford	1	1890–1891
Milltown	Belfast	1	1891–1892
**Moyola Park**	Castledawson	1	2026-
**Rathfriland Rangers**	Rathfriland	1	2026-
Royal Scots	Army team	1	1899–1900
St Columb's Court	Derry	1	1901–1902
**Strabane Athletic**	Strabane	1	2026-
Tritonville	Dublin	1	1912–1913
YMCA	Belfast	1	1891–1892

Bold – a current member
Italics – a club no longer in existence, or no longer competing in Northern Irish football

=== Relegation and promotion history ===
==== 1995–2003 (Two senior divisions) ====
Between 1995–96 and 2002–03, the league was split into two divisions, with promotion and relegation between the two as follows.

Season	Relegated to First Division	Promoted to Premier Division
1995–96	Bangor	Coleraine
1996–97	-	Ballymena United; Omagh Town
1997–98	Ards	Newry Town
1998–99	Omagh Town	Distillery
1999–2000	Lisburn Distillery	Omagh Town
2000–01	Ballymena United	Ards
2001–02	-	Lisburn Distillery; Institute

==== 2003–2016 (One senior division) ====
At the end of the 2002–03 season, the league was reformed as the single-division Irish Premier League. Four clubs were relegated to intermediate football, and from then until 2014-15 there was relegation and promotion between a single senior Irish League division and the top intermediate league below (now NIFL Championship).

Season	Relegated	Promoted
2002–03	Armagh City; Ballyclare Comrades; Bangor; Carrick Rangers	-
2003–04	Glenavon	Loughgall
2004–05	Crusaders; Omagh Town	Armagh City; Glenavon
2005–06	Ards; Institute	Crusaders; Donegal Celtic
2006–07	Loughgall	Institute
2007–08	Armagh City; Donegal Celtic; Larne; Limavady United; Portadown	Bangor
2008–09	Bangor	Portadown
2009–10	Institute	Donegal Celtic
2010–11	Newry City	Carrick Rangers
2011–12	Carrick Rangers	Ballinamallard United
2012–13	Donegal Celtic; Lisburn Distillery	Ards; Warrenpoint Town
2013–14	Ards	Institute
2014–15	Institute	Carrick Rangers
2015–16	Warrenpoint Town	Ards

==== 2016–2026 (Two senior divisions) ====
At the end of the 2015–16 season, the Championship acquired senior status and the league reverted to two senior divisions, with promotion and relegation between those divisions, and between the second senior tier (the Championship) and the top intermediate division below (now NIFL Premier Intermediate League).

Season	Relegated to Championship	Promoted to Premiership	Season	Relegated to Premier Intermediate League	Promoted to Championship
2016–17	Portadown	Warrenpoint Town	2016–17	Annagh United; Armagh City	Limavady United; Newry City AFC
2017–18	Ballinamallard United; Carrick Rangers	Institute; Newry City AFC	2017–18	Lurgan Celtic	Dundela
2018–19	Ards; Newry City AFC	Carrick Rangers; Larne	2018–19	Limavady United	Queen's University
2019–20	Institute	Portadown	2019–20	PSNI	Annagh United
2020–21	No promotion/relegation due to the COVID-19 pandemic in Northern Ireland				
2021–22	Warrenpoint Town	Newry City AFC	2021–22	Queen's University	Newington
2022–23	Portadown	Loughgall	2022–23	Warrenpoint Town	Bangor
2023–24	Newry City AFC	Portadown	2023–24	Dergview; Knockbreda	Limavady United; Armagh City
2024–25	Loughgall	Bangor	2024–25	Ballyclare Comrades; Newry City AFC	Warrenpoint Town; Queen's University
2025–26	Glenavon	Limavady United	2025–26	n/a	Moyola Park; Strabane Athletic; Rathfriland Rangers; Newry City AFC

==== 2026–present (Two senior divisions) ====
At the end of the 2025–26 season, the NIFL Premier Intermediate League was dissolved and replaced by the Conference National League.

Season	Relegated to Championship	Promoted to Premiership	Season	Relegated to Conference National League	Promoted to Championship
2026–27			2026–27		

== Intermediate ==
=== List of champions ===
==== Irish League B Division (1951–1977) ====
Season	Intermediate champions (number of intermediate titles)
1951–52	Linfield Swifts (3) (Note: Reserve team of senior club)
1952–53	Linfield Swifts (4)
1953–54	Cliftonville Olympic (1)
1954–55	Larne (2)
1955–56	Banbridge Town (1)
1956–57	Larne (3)
1957–58	Ards II (1)
1958–59	Glentoran II (5)
1959–60	Newry Town (1)
1960–61	Ballyclare Comrades (1)
1961–62	Carrick Rangers (1)
1962–63	Ballyclare Comrades (2)
1963–64	Larne (4)
1964–65	Larne (5)
1965–66	Larne (6)
1966–67	Larne (7)
1967–68	Dundela (6)
1968–69	Larne (8)
1969–70	Larne (9)
1970–71	Larne (10)
1971–72	Larne† (11)
1972–73	Carrick Rangers (2)
1973–74	Ballyclare Comrades (3)
1974–75	Carrick Rangers (3) (Note: After play-off between winners of North and South sections)
1975–76	Linfield Swifts (5)
1976–77	Carrick Rangers (4)

==== Irish League B Division Section 1 (1977–1999) ====
Season	Intermediate champions (number of intermediate titles)
1977–78	Ballyclare Comrades (4)
1978–79	Carrick Rangers (5)
1979–80	Ballyclare Comrades (5)
1980–81	Newry Town (2)
1981–82	Dundela (7)
1982–83	Carrick Rangers† (6)
1983–84	Limavady United (1)
1984–85	Chimney Corner (1)
1985–86	Dundela (8)
1986–87	RUC (1) (Note: Now PSNI)
1987–88	Dundela (9)
1988–89	Ballyclare Comrades (6)
1989–90	Dundela (10)
1990–91	Dundela (11)
1991–92	Dundela (12)
1992–93	Limavady United (2)
1993–94	Dundela (13)
1994–95	Loughgall (1)
1995–96	Loughgall (2)
1996–97	Loughgall (3)
1997–98	Loughgall (4)
1998–99	Chimney Corner (2)

==== Irish League Second Division (1999–2003) ====
Season	Intermediate champions (number of intermediate titles)
1999–2000	Dundela (14)
2000–01	Dundela (15)
2001–02	Moyola Park (1)
2002–03	Ballinamallard United (1)

==== Irish League First & Second Division (2003–04) ====
Season	Intermediate champions (number of intermediate titles)	Second-level intermediate champions (number of second-level intermediate titles)
2003–04	Loughgall‡ (5)	Coagh United (1)

==== IFA Intermediate League First & Second Division (2004–2008) ====
Season	Intermediate champions (number of intermediate titles)	Second-level intermediate champions (number of second-level intermediate titles)
2004–05	Armagh City‡ (1)	Tobermore United (1)
2005–06	Crusaders‡ (10)	Portstewart (1)
2006–07	Institute‡ (1)	Ballyclare Comrades (1)
2007–08	Loughgall (6)	Dergview (1)

==== IFA Championship & Interim Intermediate League (2008–09) ====
Season	Intermediate champions (number of intermediate titles)	Second-level intermediate champions (number of second-level intermediate titles)
2008–09	Portadown‡ (1)	Harland & Wolff Welders (1)

==== IFA Championship 1 & 2 (2009–2013) ====
Season	Intermediate champions (number of intermediate titles)	Second-level intermediate champions (number of second-level intermediate titles)
2009–10	Loughgall (7)	Harland & Wolff Welders (2)
2010–11	Carrick Rangers‡ (7)	Warrenpoint Town (1)
2011–12	Ballinamallard United‡ (2)	Coagh United (2)
2012–13	Ards‡ (2)	Knockbreda (1)

==== NIFL Championship 1 & 2 (2013–2016) ====
Season	Intermediate champions (number of intermediate titles)	Second-level intermediate champions (number of second-level intermediate titles)
2013–14	Institute‡ (2)	Armagh City (1)
2014–15	Carrick Rangers‡ (8)	Lurgan Celtic (1)
2015–16	Ards‡ (3)	Limavady United (1)

† Elected to senior football
‡ Promoted to senior football

==== NIFL Premier Intermediate League (2016–) ====
Season	Intermediate champions (number of intermediate titles)
2016–17	Limavady United‡ (3)
2017–18	Dundela‡ (16)
2018–19	Queen's University‡ (1)
2019–20	Annagh United‡ (1)
2020–21	Season cancelled due to the COVID-19 pandemic in Northern Ireland
2021–22	Newington‡ (1)
2022–23	Bangor‡ (1)
2023–24	Limavady United‡ (4)
2024–25	Warrenpoint Town‡ (1)
2025–26	Moyola Park‡ (2)

‡ Promoted to senior football

=== Summary of champions ===
Club	Wins	Winning seasons
Dundela	11	1967–68, 1981–82, 1985–86, 1987–88, 1989–90, 1990–91, 1991–92, 1993–94, 1999–2000, 2000–01, 2017–18
Larne	10	1954–55, 1956–57, 1963–64, 1964–65, 1965–66, 1966–67, 1986–69, 1969–70, 1970–71, 1971–72
Carrick Rangers	8	1961–62, 1972–73, 1974–75, 1976–77, 1978–79, 1982–83, 2010–11, 2014–15
Loughgall	7	1994–95, 1995–96, 1996–97, 1997–98, 2003–04, 2007–08, 2009–10
Ballyclare Comrades	6	1960–61, 1962–63, 1973–74, 1977–78, 1979–80, 1988–89
Limavady United	4	1983–84, 1992–93, 2016–17, 2023-24
Linfield Swifts	3	1951–52, 1952–53, 1975–76
Ards	2	2012–13, 2015–16
Ballinamallard United	2	2002–03, 2011–12
Chimney Corner	2	1984–85, 1998–99
Institute	2	2006–07, 2013–14
Moyola Park	2	2001–02, 2025-26
Newry Town	2	1959–60, 1980–81
Annagh United	1	2019–20
Ards II	1	1957–58
Armagh City	1	2004–05
Banbridge Town	1	1955–56
Cliftonville Olympic	1	1953–54
Crusaders	1	2005–06
Glentoran II	1	1958–59
Newington	1	2021–22
RUC	1	1986–87
Portadown	1	2008–09
Queen's University	1	2018–19
Bangor	1	2022–23
Warrenpoint Town	1	2024–25

=== Knock-out competitions ===
In 1982, a knockout competition for members was introduced, known as the B Division Knockout Cup and sponsored by Smirnoff. It was discontinued after 2002, but a new IFA Intermediate League Cup was played between 2004 and 2008, sponsored in its first season by the Daily Mirror and thereafter by Carnegie. In 2008–09, there was no knockout competition for Championship clubs, who participated with Premiership clubs in the Irish League Cup. In the 2009–10 season only, however, while Championship 1 clubs continued to participate in the Irish League Cup, a Championship 2 League Cup was inaugurated for those in Championship 2. From 2010–11 onwards, all Championship clubs from divisions 1 and 2 also competed in the Irish League Cup, and the Championship 2 League Cup was abolished.

Season	Winners
B Division Knockout Cup
1982–83	RUC
1983–84	Ballyclare Comrades
1984–85	RUC
1985–86	RUC
1986–87	Chimney Corner
1987–88	Dundela
1988–89	Ballyclare Comrades
1989–90	Omagh Town
1990–91	Dundela
1991–92	Dundela
1992–93	Limavady United
1993–94	Dungannon Swifts
1994–95	Dundela
1995–96	Limavady United
1996–97	Institute
1997–98	Harland & Wolff Welders
1998–99	Ballymoney United
1999–2000	Moyola Park
2000–01	Harland & Wolff Welders
2001–02	Harland & Wolff Welders
2002–03	No competition
2003–04	No competition
IFA Intermediate League Cup
2004–05	Bangor
2005–06	Crusaders
2006–07	Institute
2007–08	Loughgall
2008–09	No competition
Championship 2 League Cup
2009–10	Harland & Wolff Welders

==== Summary of winners ====
Club	Wins	Winning seasons
Dundela	4	1987–88, 1990–91, 1991–92, 1994–95
Harland & Wolff Welders	4	1997–98, 2000–01, 2001–02, 2009–10
RUC	3	1982–83, 1984–85, 1985–86
Ballyclare Comrades	2	1983–84, 1988–89
Institute	2	1996–97, 2006–07
Limavady United	2	1992–93, 1995–96
Ballymoney United	1	1998–99
Bangor	1	2004–05
Chimney Corner	1	1986–87
Crusaders	1	2005–06
Dungannon Swifts	1	1993–94
Loughgall	1	2007–08
Moyola Park	1	1999–2000
Omagh Town	1	1989–90
