= 1949–50 Irish League =

Irish League
- Season: 1949–50
- Champions: Linfield; 20th Irish title
- Matches: 132
- Goals: 520 (3.94 per match)
- Top goalscorer: Sammy Hughes (23 goals)

Location of teams in the Irish League from 1949–1972
Location of Belfast-based teams in the Irish League from 1949–1972

The 1949–50 Irish League was the 49th edition of the Irish League, the highest level of league competition in Northern Irish football. The league comprised 12 teams, and Linfield won the championship after a play-off with Glentoran. Former intermediate club Crusaders F.C. entered the league in place of Belfast Celtic F.C., who had withdrawn after the previous season.

== League standings ==
Pos	Team	Pld	W	D	L	GF	GA	GR	Pts	Result
1	Linfield (C)	22	17	4	1	64	27	2.370	38	Champions
2	Glentoran	22	18	2	2	70	25	2.800	38	
3	Distillery	22	13	3	6	48	31	1.548	29	
4	Derry City	22	12	5	5	44	29	1.517	29	
5	Glenavon	22	10	4	8	51	38	1.342	24	
6	Ards	22	7	6	9	34	38	0.895	20	
7	Bangor	22	8	3	11	38	36	1.056	19	
8	Ballymena United	22	5	5	12	29	49	0.592	15	
9	Portadown	22	3	9	10	33	52	0.635	15	
10	Coleraine	22	5	4	13	38	61	0.623	14	
11	Crusaders	22	4	5	13	37	69	0.536	13	
12	Cliftonville	22	3	4	15	34	65	0.523	10	

Source: rsssf.com
(C) Champions

== Results ==
Home \ Away	ARD	BAN	BLM	CLI	COL	CRU	DIS	DER	GLV	GLT	LIN	POR
Ards		2–2	1–1	0–0	3–1	5–2	2–2	0–1	0–2	3–4	0–2	1–1
Bangor	1–2		3–0	1–3	2–1	1–2	2–3	2–3	0–1	0–4	0–2	7–0
Ballymena United	0–0	1–2		6–0	4–1	1–3	0–3	1–1	1–1	1–5	1–3	1–2
Cliftonville	6–0	1–2	2–2		1–3	2–7	1–4	0–3	2–4	0–6	1–4	3–3
Coleraine	1–0	2–4	0–1	3–0		2–2	1–3	3–6	6–4	0–5	2–3	3–2
Crusaders	2–6	0–4	0–1	0–5	2–2		1–1	0–4	4–1	0–4	2–2	2–3
Distillery	1–2	1–1	2–1	4–1	3–1	2–1		1–2	5–1	1–4	0–2	1–0
Derry City	1–3	2–0	5–1	3–0	0–0	2–0	2–4		0–1	1–1	2–2	1–0
Glenavon	3–0	0–1	3–1	2–2	4–0	9–0	3–2	6–2		2–3	1–2	1–1
Glentoran	2–1	1–0	5–0	4–2	2–1	4–2	2–3	2–0	3–1		2–3	2–1
Linfield	3–1	4–2	6–1	2–1	7–2	4–1	1–0	1–2	2–0	1–1		2–2
Portadown	0–2	1–1	1–3	2–1	3–3	4–4	0–2	1–1	1–1	2–4	3–6	

Source: Irish League Archive
Legend: Blue = home team win; Yellow = draw; Red = away team win.

=== Test match ===
10 May 1950

Linfield	2–0	Glentoran

Solitude, Belfast
