= 1950–51 Irish League =

Irish League
- Season: 1950–51
- Champions: Glentoran; 9th Irish title
- Matches played: 132
- Goals scored: 533 (4.04 per match)
- Top goalscorer: Sammy Hughes; Walter Allen (23 goals each)

Location of teams in the Irish League from 1949–1972
Location of Belfast-based teams in the Irish League from 1949–1972

The 1950–51 Irish League was the 50th edition of the Irish League, the highest level of league competition in Northern Irish football. The league comprised 12 teams, and Glentoran won the championship.

== League standings ==
Pos	Team	Pld	W	D	L	GF	GA	GR	Pts	Result
1	Glentoran (C)	22	18	2	2	66	21	3.143	38	Champions
2	Linfield	22	15	4	3	57	24	2.375	34	
3	Glenavon	22	14	3	5	58	31	1.871	31	
4	Coleraine	22	13	2	7	55	35	1.571	28	
5	Portadown	22	12	1	9	55	35	1.571	25	
6	Distillery	22	9	4	9	45	44	1.023	22	
7	Crusaders	22	8	5	9	42	51	0.824	21	
8	Cliftonville	22	7	2	13	42	60	0.700	16	
9	Derry City	22	6	4	12	27	50	0.540	16	
10	Ballymena United	22	5	4	13	30	54	0.556	14	
11	Bangor	22	4	3	15	28	62	0.452	11	
12	Ards	22	3	2	17	28	66	0.424	8	

Source: rsssf.com
(C) Champions

== Results ==
Home \ Away	ARD	BAN	BLM	CLI	COL	CRU	DIS	DER	GLV	GLT	LIN	POR
Ards		3–0	1–1	3–0	1–3	1–2	3–5	1–2	1–2	1–5	0–3	3–2
Bangor	1–1		4–1	4–3	1–5	0–3	1–2	2–2	0–1	1–6	3–5	1–4
Ballymena United	4–2	0–2		4–0	2–3	1–2	2–2	2–1	1–5	0–2	3–2	0–2
Cliftonville	3–1	4–0	2–0		2–3	3–2	2–3	2–0	1–0	0–4	0–2	4–4
Coleraine	5–0	3–1	3–0	6–1		6–1	0–3	4–1	1–1	1–0	1–0	2–0
Crusaders	8–1	1–2	3–3	4–4	4–2		1–1	3–2	1–4	1–1	1–1	1–0
Distillery	2–1	6–0	1–2	2–3	2–2	2–0		3–1	1–4	1–4	0–1	3–1
Derry City	3–2	1–1	3–1	3–2	1–0	0–1	1–1		0–3	1–2	0–6	1–0
Glenavon	4–0	2–0	4–0	4–2	6–2	4–0	6–2	1–1		1–3	1–1	2–7
Glentoran	7–2	2–1	2–0	5–3	3–2	4–1	2–1	4–1	3–0		1–1	3–0
Linfield	3–0	3–2	1–1	3–0	2–1	6–0	4–2	3–2	3–1	2–1		4–2
Coleraine	1–0	4–1	7–2	3–1	3–0	3–2	3–0	6–0	1–2	0–2	2–1	

Source: Irish League Archive
Legend: Blue = home team win; Yellow = draw; Red = away team win.
