= 1952–53 Irish League =

Irish League
- Season: 1952–53
- Champions: Glentoran; 10th Irish title
- Matches played: 132
- Goals scored: 461 (3.49 per match)
- Top goalscorer: Sammy Hughes (28 goals)

Location of teams in the Irish League from 1949–1972
Location of Belfast-based teams in the Irish League from 1949–1972

The 1952–53 Irish League was the 52nd edition of the Irish League, the highest level of league competition in Northern Irish football. The league comprised 12 teams, and Glentoran won the championship.

== League standings ==
Pos	Team	Pld	W	D	L	GF	GA	GR	Pts	Result
1	Glentoran (C)	22	14	5	3	59	25	2.360	33	Champions
2	Linfield	22	12	7	3	47	18	2.611	31	
3	Ballymena United	22	13	3	6	57	34	1.676	29	
4	Glenavon	22	11	3	8	49	39	1.256	25	
5	Distillery	22	9	5	8	26	27	0.963	23	
6	Coleraine	22	8	6	8	40	43	0.930	22	
7	Crusaders	22	7	7	8	39	36	1.083	21	
8	Ards	22	7	7	8	32	35	0.914	21	
9	Cliftonville	22	8	3	11	37	61	0.607	19	
10	Portadown	22	6	7	9	28	35	0.800	19	
11	Derry City	22	5	3	14	27	47	0.574	13	
12	Bangor	22	3	2	17	20	61	0.328	8	

Source: rsssf.com
(C) Champions

== Results ==
Home \ Away	ARD	BAN	BLM	CLI	COL	CRU	DIS	DER	GLV	GLT	LIN	POR
Ards		2–1	1–3	3–1	6–4	1–1	0–1	3–0	1–0	1–1	1–1	0–0
Bangor	2–2		1–2	1–2	0–3	0–3	1–0	0–0	2–5	0–2	2–1	3–2
Ballymena United	4–0	3–1		6–1	1–1	5–3	4–0	3–0	4–1	0–1	2–2	4–0
Cliftonville	2–1	4–1	1–4		3–2	3–1	3–2	1–0	2–1	2–4	1–4	1–4
Coleraine	2–2	3–1	2–1	4–0		1–1	1–2	0–3	2–1	2–5	0–2	2–1
Crusaders	2–1	5–2	1–2	4–2	2–2		3–0	4–0	1–2	4–2	1–1	2–2
Distillery	0–0	3–0	2–4	0–0	3–1	2–0		2–0	0–2	1–1	0–1	1–0
Derry City	1–3	4–1	3–1	2–2	0–2	3–0	2–2		2–4	2–3	1–3	3–0
Glenavon	4–3	3–0	5–2	4–4	0–2	2–0	0–1	5–1		0–3	2–2	3–2
Glentoran	3–0	6–0	4–1	7–1	2–2	2–0	1–3	2–0	1–1		3–1	4–1
Linfield	2–0	5–1	3–0	3–0	6–1	0–0	2–0	4–0	2–0	1–1		1–1
Portadown	0–1	1–0	1–1	3–1	1–1	1–1	1–1	2–0	2–4	2–1	1–0	

Source: Irish League Archive
Legend: Blue = home team win; Yellow = draw; Red = away team win.
