= 1982–83 Irish League =

Irish League
- Season: 1982–83
- Champions: Linfield; 35th Irish title
- Matches played: 132
- Goals scored: 399 (3.02 per match)
- Top goalscorer: Jim Campbell (15 goals)

Location of teams in the Irish League from 1980–83
Location of Belfast-based teams in the Irish League from 1980–83

The 1982–83 Irish League was the 82nd edition of the Irish League, the highest level of league competition in Northern Irish football. The league consisted of 12 teams, and Linfield won the championship.

== League standings ==
Pos	Team	Pld	W	D	L	GF	GA	GD	Pts	Qualification
1	Linfield (C)	22	15	5	2	43	13	+30	35	Qualification for the European Cup first round
2	Glentoran	22	14	2	6	49	21	+28	30	Qualification for the European Cup Winners' Cup first round
3	Coleraine	22	11	6	5	44	25	+19	28	Qualification for the UEFA Cup first round
4	Portadown	22	10	6	6	29	17	+12	26	
5	Crusaders	22	11	3	8	35	26	+9	25	
6	Cliftonville	22	10	4	8	30	24	+6	24	
7	Ards	22	9	4	9	40	41	−1	22	
8	Ballymena United	22	8	4	10	32	41	−9	20	
9	Distillery	22	7	4	11	23	46	−23	18	
10	Glenavon	22	6	4	12	26	37	−11	16	
11	Larne	22	6	3	13	31	40	−9	15	
12	Bangor	22	1	3	18	17	68	−51	5	

Source: rsssf.com
(C) Champions

== Results ==
Home \ Away	ARD	BAN	BLM	CLI	COL	CRU	DIS	GLV	GLT	LRN	LIN	POR
Ards		5–1	4–0	2–4	0–3	3–1	1–0	4–2	1–3	1–0	0–1	3–2
Bangor	1–2		0–3	0–3	1–3	0–3	0–1	0–0	0–3	1–1	3–6	0–6
Ballymena United	4–4	1–1		1–0	2–4	0–0	1–2	2–0	1–3	4–2	0–2	0–0
Cliftonville	0–0	5–0	1–0		1–0	1–0	2–0	1–1	1–3	3–2	0–0	0–1
Coleraine	2–0	4–1	2–4	3–1		5–0	3–3	1–1	3–1	1–0	0–0	1–1
Crusaders	0–0	3–1	6–0	2–1	1–3		3–1	0–1	2–1	2–1	0–3	2–0
Distillery	3–2	1–2	2–1	2–1	2–1	1–6		1–0	1–3	1–4	0–4	0–0
Glenavon	5–3	3–1	1–3	1–2	0–0	0–3	5–0		1–3	0–1	0–3	1–0
Glentoran	4–1	2–1	1–0	1–1	0–1	3–0	4–0	4–1		5–0	3–0	0–1
Larne	2–3	5–2	1–2	0–1	3–2	0–1	2–2	2–1	2–0		0–1	2–2
Linfield	0–0	6–0	4–1	1–0	2–1	1–0	0–0	3–1	2–2	3–1		1–0
Portadown	3–1	2–1	1–2	4–1	1–1	0–0	1–0	0–1	1–0	2–0	1–0	

Source: Irish League Archive
Legend: Blue = home team win; Yellow = draw; Red = away team win.
