= 1979–80 Irish League =

Irish League
- Season: 1979–80
- Champions: Linfield; 33rd Irish title
- Matches played: 132
- Goals scored: 399 (3.02 per match)
- Top goalscorer: Jimmy Martin (17 goals)

Location of teams in the 1979–80 Irish League
Location of the Belfast-based teams in the 1979–80 Irish League

The 1979–80 Irish League was the 79th edition of the Irish League, the highest level of league competition in Northern Irish football. The league consisted of 12 teams, and Linfield won the championship.

== League standings ==
Pos	Team	Pld	W	D	L	GF	GA	GD	Pts	Qualification
1	Linfield (C)	22	19	1	2	59	17	+42	39	Qualification for the European Cup first round
2	Ballymena United	22	12	6	4	52	23	+29	30	Qualification for the UEFA Cup first round
3	Glentoran	22	10	7	5	34	27	+7	27	
4	Cliftonville	22	10	6	6	29	16	+13	26	
5	Crusaders	22	11	2	9	32	24	+8	24	Qualification for the European Cup Winners' Cup first round
6	Portadown	22	10	3	9	36	37	−1	23	
7	Coleraine	22	9	4	9	46	48	−2	22	
8	Distillery	22	7	4	11	22	48	−26	18	
9	Glenavon	22	5	6	11	19	30	−11	16	
10	Bangor	22	6	4	12	27	50	−23	16	
11	Ards	22	4	5	13	26	39	−13	13	
12	Larne	22	3	4	15	17	40	−23	10	

Source: rsssf.com
(C) Champions

== Results ==
Home \ Away	ARD	BAN	BLM	CLI	COL	CRU	DIS	GLV	GLT	LRN	LIN	POR
Ards		1–1	1–3	0–2	4–1	2–5	0–1	3–0	1–3	1–1	1–1	4–1
Bangor	3–2		2–3	0–2	0–5	2–3	0–1	0–0	1–1	4–2	0–2	1–4
Ballymena United	2–0	2–0		1–1	5–0	2–1	8–0	0–1	1–1	4–0	5–0	2–1
Cliftonville	2–0	3–0	2–1		1–3	1–0	0–1	2–0	2–2	0–0	0–1	0–0
Coleraine	2–0	2–3	1–1	1–5		5–2	2–2	3–1	1–3	1–0	1–5	2–2
Crusaders	2–0	0–1	1–1	1–0	3–1		1–2	0–0	1–0	2–0	0–1	2–0
Distillery	1–1	1–2	1–3	1–1	1–5	0–4		2–0	0–4	2–1	1–2	0–3
Glenavon	2–2	4–1	1–1	0–1	0–2	0–1	1–1		1–1	2–1	1–2	1–0
Glentoran	2–0	1–1	2–0	1–1	2–4	0–2	2–1	3–1		1–0	1–2	1–0
Larne	0–3	1–3	1–1	1–0	2–2	2–1	1–0	0–1	1–2		2–3	0–2
Linfield	1–0	7–0	4–1	1–0	2–0	3–0	6–1	2–1	5–0	2–0		6–0
Portadown	3–0	3–2	2–5	1–3	4–2	1–0	1–2	2–1	1–1	3–1	2–1	

Source: Irish League Archive
Legend: Blue = home team win; Yellow = draw; Red = away team win.
