= 1896–97 Irish League =

Irish League
- Season: 1896–97
- Dates: 5 September 1896 – 26 December 1896
- Champions: Glentoran; 2nd Irish title
- Matches: 30
- Goals: 125 (4.17 per match)
- Top goalscorer: Johnny Darling; Richard Peden (6 goals each)
- Biggest home win: Linfield 7–1 North Staffs
- Biggest away win: Distillery 0–6 Linfield; North Staffs 0–6 Glentoran
- Highest scoring: Linfield 7–4 Distillery

The 1896–97 Irish League was the 7th edition of the Irish League, the highest level of league competition in Irish football.

The league comprised six teams, an increase from the four of the previous season. Glentoran won the championship for the second time.

== Season summary ==
After two seasons of historically low numbers of just four teams, two teams were elected into the league for the 1896–97 season: Celtic (who from 1901 onwards would become more commonly known as "Belfast Celtic") and the North Staffordshire Regiment, the second British Army team to compete in the league after the Lancashire Fusiliers who competed in the 1891–92 season. Neither side had a ground, meaning all their matches were played at their opponents' grounds.

== Teams and locations ==
Location of teams in the 1896–97 Irish League; all matches were played in Belfast

Team	Town	Home Ground
Celtic	No home ground	
Cliftonville	Belfast	Solitude
Distillery	Belfast	Grosvenor Park
Glentoran	Belfast	The Oval
Linfield	Belfast	Balmoral
North Staffordshire Regiment	No home ground	

== League standings ==
Pos	Team	Pld	W	D	L	GF	GA	GR	Pts	Result
1	Glentoran (C)	10	8	1	1	24	10	2.400	17	Champions
2	Cliftonville	10	4	3	3	22	20	1.100	11	
3	Linfield	10	4	3	3	34	24	1.417	11	
4	Distillery	10	3	3	4	17	23	0.739	9	
5	North Staffordshire Regiment	10	2	4	4	17	23	0.739	8	
6	Celtic	10	1	2	7	11	25	0.440	4	

Source: rsssf.com
(C) Champions

== Results ==
=== League ===
Home \ Away	CEL	CLI	DIS	GLT	LIN	NSR
Celtic		1–3	2–1	1–3	2–4	1–1
Cliftonville	3–1		2–3	1–3	1–1	2–2
Distillery	2–0	2–2		2–0	0–6	1–1
Glentoran	2–0	3–2	2–1		1–0	2–1
Linfield	3–3	3–4	7–4	2–2		7–1
North Staffordshire	3–0	1–2	1–1	0–6	6–1	

Source: Irish League Archive
Legend: Blue = home team win; Yellow = draw; Red = away team win.

=== 2nd/3rd place play-off ===
- Cliftonville 3–2 Linfield (Solitude, Belfast)
