= 1904–05 Irish League =

Irish League
- Season: 1904–05
- Dates: 3 September 1904 – 1 March 1905
- Champions: Glentoran; 3rd Irish title
- Matches played: 56
- Goals scored: 136 (2.43 per match)
- Biggest home win: Cliftonville 5–0 Bohemians
- Biggest away win: Belfast Celtic 0–3 Distillery; Derry Celtic 0–3 Distillery
- Highest scoring: Derry Celtic 2–4 Bohemians

The 1904–05 Irish League was the 15th edition of the Irish League, the highest level of league competition in Irish football.

The league comprised eight teams, and Glentoran won the championship for the 3rd time after winning a play-off with Belfast Celtic by a score of 3–1.

== Season summary ==
King's Own Scottish Borderers did not compete in the league this season and would not appear in the Irish League again. Their place was taken by Shelbourne, who became the second team from Dublin to join the league.

== Teams and locations ==
Location of teams in the 1904–05 Irish League
Location of Belfast teams in the 1904–05 Irish League
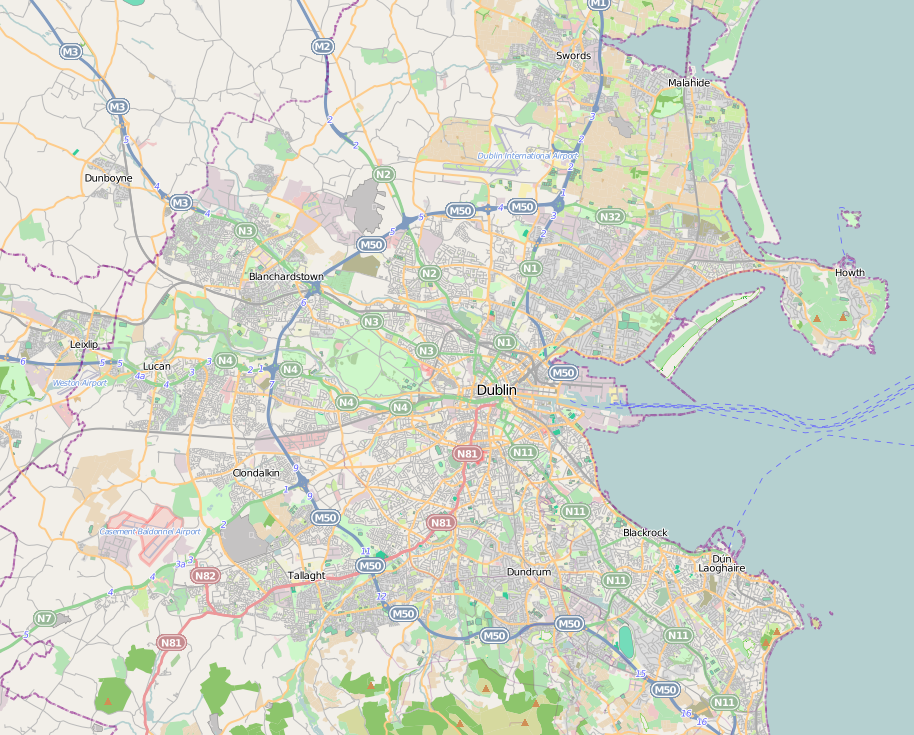
Location of Dublin teams in the 1904–05 Irish League

Team	Town	Home Ground
Belfast Celtic	Belfast	Celtic Park
Bohemians	Dublin	Dalymount Park
Cliftonville	Belfast	Solitude
Derry Celtic	Derry	Brandywell
Distillery	Belfast	Grosvenor Park
Glentoran	Belfast	The Oval
Linfield	Belfast	Balmoral
Shelbourne	Dublin	Serpentine Avenue

== League standings ==
Pos	Team	Pld	W	D	L	GF	GA	GR	Pts	Result
1	Glentoran (C)	14	9	3	2	22	12	1.833	21	Champions
2	Belfast Celtic	14	9	3	2	21	10	2.100	21	
3	Linfield	14	6	4	4	18	12	1.500	16	
4	Distillery	14	6	3	5	16	11	1.455	15	
5	Cliftonville	14	6	1	7	17	17	1.000	13	
6	Shelbourne	14	5	3	6	15	17	0.882	13	
7	Derry Celtic	14	1	5	8	12	31	0.387	7	
8	Bohemians	14	2	2	10	15	26	0.577	6	

Source: rsssf.com
(C) Champions

== Results ==
=== League ===
Home \ Away	BCE	BOH	CLI	DCE	DIS	GLT	LIN	SHE
Belfast Celtic		3–1	2–0	3–0	0–3	1–1	0–0	2–1
Bohemians	0–1		3–1	4–0	0–1	1–2	1–1	0–2
Cliftonville	0–1	5–0		2–1	2–1	1–2	3–0	0–2
Derry Celtic	2–4	3–3	0–0		0–3	0–2	0–0	3–1
Distillery	0–2	2–0	0–1	0–0		2–0	0–2	0–0
Glentoran	1–0	1–0	3–0	3–1	1–1		1–0	2–0
Linfield	0–1	3–2	2–0	4–0	1–2	2–2		2–0
Shelbourne	1–1	1–0	0–2	2–2	2–1	3–1	0–1	

Source: Irish League Archive
Legend: Blue = home team win; Yellow = draw; Red = away team win.

=== Test match ===
1 April 1905

Glentoran	3–1	Belfast Celtic
Kirkwood; Doherty; Leonard	Report	Clarke

Grosvenor Park, Belfast
Attendance: 2,500
Referee: Plastow (Grimsby)

== External list ==
- Northern Ireland - List of final tables (RSSSF)
