= 1954–55 Irish League =

Irish League
- Season: 1954–55
- Champions: Linfield; 22nd Irish title
- Matches: 132
- Goals: 522 (3.95 per match)
- Top goalscorer: Billy Kennedy (27 goals)

Location of teams in the Irish League from 1949–1972
Location of Belfast-based teams in the Irish League from 1949–1972

The 1954–55 Irish League was the 54th edition of the Irish League, the highest level of league competition in Northern Irish football. The league comprised 12 teams, and Linfield won the championship after winning a playoff against Glenavon.

== League standings ==
Pos	Team	Pld	W	D	L	GF	GA	GR	Pts	Result
1	Linfield (C)	22	15	6	1	46	21	2.190	36	Champions
2	Glenavon	22	16	4	2	61	27	2.259	36	
3	Cliftonville	22	10	4	8	50	38	1.316	24	
4	Ards	22	9	6	7	53	45	1.178	24	
5	Coleraine	22	11	2	9	46	46	1.000	24	
6	Glentoran	22	11	1	10	54	46	1.174	23	
7	Bangor	22	8	4	10	43	53	0.811	20	
8	Distillery	22	7	4	11	35	44	0.795	18	
9	Crusaders	22	7	2	13	29	48	0.604	16	
10	Portadown	22	5	5	12	39	53	0.736	15	
11	Derry City	22	6	3	13	31	49	0.633	15	
12	Ballymena United	22	4	5	13	35	52	0.673	13	

Source: rsssf.com
(C) Champions

== Results ==
Home \ Away	ARD	BAN	BLM	CLI	COL	CRU	DIS	DER	GLV	GLT	LIN	POR
Ards		5–1	4–3	4–5	6–1	4–0	4–0	4–2	0–1	3–1	1–3	3–3
Bangor	1–1		2–2	0–5	2–2	3–1	2–1	2–1	1–4	2–3	2–2	2–0
Ballymena United	2–2	1–3		2–3	4–2	2–0	2–2	2–1	2–3	0–4	2–3	3–3
Cliftonville	1–1	5–1	1–0		1–2	0–1	2–0	5–1	0–4	1–2	1–1	3–3
Coleraine	4–1	2–5	3–0	3–2		3–0	4–0	4–2	1–3	1–1	2–1	2–0
Crusaders	2–2	2–3	1–3	1–4	1–2		5–1	0–0	0–4	1–5	2–3	2–0
Distillery	2–3	0–2	3–1	2–1	1–3	5–3		4–0	2–2	1–3	1–1	3–1
Derry City	0–1	2–1	1–1	2–1	5–2	0–2	1–0		1–2	2–1	1–2	1–1
Glenavon	4–0	4–2	3–1	1–1	1–0	0–1	3–1	7–4		3–1	1–1	5–3
Glentoran	3–2	5–3	4–1	1–3	3–1	1–2	1–4	6–1	2–5		1–2	4–2
Linfield	2–2	3–2	2–0	2–0	2–1	3–0	0–0	1–0	2–0	3–0		5–2
Portadown	4–0	2–1	2–1	4–5	5–1	0–2	0–2	0–3	1–1	3–2	0–2	

Source: Irish League Archive
Legend: Blue = home team win; Yellow = draw; Red = away team win.

=== Test match ===
25 May 1955

Linfield	2–0	Glenavon

The Oval, Belfast
