= 1955–56 Irish League =

Irish League
- Season: 1955–56
- Champions: Linfield; 23rd Irish title
- Matches played: 132
- Goals scored: 574 (4.35 per match)
- Top goalscorer: Jimmy Jones (26 goals)

Location of teams in the Irish League from 1949–1972
Location of Belfast-based teams in the Irish League from 1949–1972

The 1955–56 Irish League was the 55th edition of the Irish League, the highest level of league competition in Northern Irish football. The league comprised 12 teams, and Linfield won the championship.

== League standings ==
Pos	Team	Pld	W	D	L	GF	GA	GR	Pts	Result
1	Linfield (C)	22	19	2	1	56	16	3.500	40	Champions
2	Glenavon	22	14	1	7	77	38	2.026	29	
3	Bangor	22	11	5	6	69	54	1.278	27	
4	Coleraine	22	10	5	7	56	46	1.217	25	
5	Glentoran	22	10	4	8	43	40	1.075	24	
6	Distillery	22	7	7	8	39	40	0.975	21	
7	Ards	22	9	2	11	44	45	0.978	20	
8	Portadown	22	7	4	11	43	57	0.754	18	
9	Derry City	22	6	4	12	42	54	0.778	16	
10	Crusaders	22	6	4	12	36	53	0.679	16	
11	Cliftonville	22	5	4	13	33	62	0.532	14	
12	Ballymena United	22	7	0	15	36	69	0.522	14	

Source: rsssf.com
(C) Champions

== Results ==
Home \ Away	ARD	BAN	BLM	CLI	COL	CRU	DIS	DER	GLV	GLT	LIN	POR
Ards		2–4	4–3	3–2	1–1	5–2	3–2	1–2	1–0	2–3	0–1	4–0
Bangor	1–1		6–2	4–2	4–4	8–3	2–2	4–1	4–6	4–2	0–4	2–3
Ballymena United	3–2	2–3		1–2	0–4	2–1	3–1	1–3	1–4	4–1	1–3	1–4
Cliftonville	1–6	0–1	3–1		1–2	1–1	1–4	3–3	1–7	0–1	0–4	0–0
Coleraine	1–0	3–4	5–1	4–1		1–2	2–1	3–1	1–2	2–3	1–1	4–2
Crusaders	3–0	1–1	6–0	1–1	2–2		0–1	3–2	2–1	2–3	2–5	1–0
Distillery	1–2	2–2	5–1	0–3	5–2	3–0		2–1	2–1	0–0	1–3	2–2
Derry City	3–1	2–1	1–2	5–2	2–2	4–1	2–2		1–4	1–2	1–2	1–1
Glenavon	6–0	3–1	3–1	1–2	9–6	5–1	3–1	5–2		4–4	0–1	4–0
Glentoran	2–1	2–3	2–3	3–4	0–1	2–1	0–0	4–2	4–2		1–1	0–1
Linfield	2–1	4–3	1–2	4–1	2–1	3–0	5–0	3–1	1–0	1–0		2–0
Portadown	2–4	3–7	5–1	6–2	2–4	3–1	2–2	5–1	1–7	1–4	0–3	

Source: Irish League Archive
Legend: Blue = home team win; Yellow = draw; Red = away team win.
