= 1936–37 Irish League =

Annual soccer tournament

Irish League
- Season: 1936–37
- Champions: Belfast Celtic; 10th Irish title
- Matches: 182
- Goals: 780 (4.29 per match)

Location of teams in the Irish League from 1934–40
Location of Belfast-based teams in the Irish League from 1934–40

The 1936–37 Irish League was the 43rd edition of the Irish League, the highest level of league competition in Northern Irish football. The league comprised 14 teams, and Belfast Celtic won the championship.

== League standings ==
Pos	Team	Pld	W	D	L	GF	GA	GR	Pts	Result
1	Belfast Celtic (C)	26	20	4	2	86	21	4.095	44	Champions
2	Derry City	26	20	3	3	85	37	2.297	43	
3	Linfield	26	20	2	4	85	25	3.400	42	
4	Portadown	26	14	4	8	49	38	1.289	32	
5	Larne	26	13	2	11	63	57	1.105	28	
6	Newry Town	26	12	3	11	59	48	1.229	27	
7	Glentoran	26	11	3	12	65	65	1.000	25	
8	Cliftonville	26	9	6	11	56	64	0.875	24	
9	Glenavon	26	10	1	15	56	59	0.949	21	
10	Bangor	26	8	3	15	40	80	0.500	19	
11	Ards	26	8	2	16	42	73	0.575	18	
12	Coleraine	26	6	5	15	24	61	0.393	17	
13	Distillery	26	6	2	18	36	65	0.554	14	
14	Ballymena United	26	4	2	20	34	87	0.391	10	

Source: rsssf.com
(C) Champions

== Results ==
Home \ Away	ARD	BAN	BLM	BCE	CLI	COL	DER	DIS	GLV	GLT	LAR	LIN	NEW	POR
Ards		0–1	6–1	0–5	3–1	1–1	4–5	3–1	0–4	2–0	5–0	2–6	0–2	1–3
Bangor	1–1		2–0	0–8	1–1	2–1	1–6	4–0	4–3	1–4	1–3	1–7	2–1	1–3
Ballymena United	4–1	2–5		0–2	1–3	1–0	1–4	3–1	1–3	4–4	1–3	0–7	1–3	1–3
Belfast Celtic	10–0	5–0	4–0		4–2	5–0	4–2	2–1	1–0	2–2	2–1	4–0	4–1	1–3
Cliftonville	4–2	0–2	4–1	0–1		3–1	2–2	7–4	3–0	3–3	5–3	0–2	2–6	3–3
Coleraine	0–2	0–0	1–0	0–6	2–0		1–1	1–0	1–1	0–1	2–2	0–3	2–1	2–1
Derry City	3–1	5–2	2–0	2–1	4–0	4–0		5–2	5–2	4–1	4–1	2–1	6–1	4–0
Distillery	2–1	2–1	2–2	1–2	1–1	1–2	1–3		4–1	1–0	2–3	0–4	0–3	1–3
Glenavon	1–2	4–0	5–2	1–5	4–6	3–2	3–1	4–1		0–1	5–0	2–3	3–1	2–0
Glentoran	2–1	6–1	8–2	2–4	1–0	5–3	4–5	0–5	5–2		2–4	2–3	4–2	2–3
Larne	9–1	4–3	1–2	1–1	3–4	4–0	0–2	2–1	3–1	4–2		0–3	4–1	3–0
Linfield	3–1	7–2	4–0	1–2	2–0	4–1	2–2	5–0	3–0	5–1	2–0		4–0	1–2
Newry Town	4–1	5–1	5–3	0–0	7–1	7–0	1–0	3–1	3–2	1–2	0–3	0–0		1–2
Portadown	0–1	2–1	4–1	1–1	1–1	3–1	1–2	0–1	2–0	3–1	5–2	1–3	0–0	

Source: Irish League Archive
Legend: Blue = home team win; Yellow = draw; Red = away team win.
