= 1930–31 Irish League =

Irish League
- Season: 1930–31
- Champions: Glentoran; 8th Irish title
- Matches played: 182
- Goals scored: 882 (4.85 per match)
- Top goalscorer: Fred Roberts (55 goals)

Location of teams in the Irish League from 1929–34
Location of Belfast-based teams in the Irish League from 1929–34

The 1930–31 Irish League was the 37th edition of the Irish League, the highest level of league competition in Northern Irish football. The league comprised 14 teams, with Glentoran winning the championship.

== League standings ==
Pos	Team	Pld	W	D	L	GF	GA	GR	Pts	Result
1	Glentoran (C)	26	22	3	1	96	39	2.462	47	Champions
2	Linfield	26	16	6	4	73	42	1.738	38	
3	Belfast Celtic	26	16	4	6	75	52	1.442	36	
4	Distillery	26	15	4	7	82	46	1.783	34	
5	Ballymena	26	13	5	8	75	50	1.500	31	
6	Ards	26	11	5	10	68	69	0.986	27	
7	Derry City	26	10	4	12	50	61	0.820	24	
8	Cliftonville	26	11	2	13	54	70	0.771	24	
9	Portadown	26	7	5	14	63	73	0.863	19	
10	Bangor	26	7	5	14	62	75	0.827	19	
11	Glenavon	26	8	3	15	47	75	0.627	19	
12	Coleraine	26	6	6	14	48	56	0.857	18	
13	Larne	26	6	6	14	44	74	0.595	18	
14	Newry Town	26	4	2	20	45	100	0.450	10	

Source: rsssf.com
(C) Champions

== Results ==
Home \ Away	ARD	BAN	BLM	BCE	CLI	COL	DER	DIS	GLV	GLT	LAR	LIN	NEW	POR
Ards		5–4	3–6	1–3	2–3	3–3	4–4	3–1	6–1	1–4	0–0	5–1	6–2	5–4
Bangor	3–3		2–6	3–4	2–1	3–2	1–2	3–3	4–4	0–3	2–2	1–6	5–0	6–2
Ballymena	5–1	1–4		4–1	2–2	2–3	4–1	4–0	6–1	2–4	3–1	2–2	6–1	1–3
Belfast Celtic	3–2	3–1	4–1		1–1	4–3	1–3	3–1	4–1	2–4	6–0	4–4	5–2	3–2
Cliftonville	5–2	4–2	4–3	0–5		1–4	3–0	4–3	3–1	0–5	2–0	0–1	1–4	3–2
Coleraine	1–4	2–3	1–1	0–1	2–0		0–2	3–3	7–0	0–2	2–2	1–2	5–3	1–1
Derry City	0–1	3–3	1–2	1–2	5–0	2–0		2–3	5–2	4–4	0–0	6–2	1–0	1–0
Distillery	1–0	3–1	1–2	2–1	2–1	4–3	9–0		5–1	2–3	3–1	3–3	9–1	5–0
Glenavon	3–4	2–1	1–1	0–2	2–1	2–0	4–2	1–4		1–5	2–1	0–1	6–1	1–1
Glentoran	4–2	3–1	2–2	4–3	5–2	2–0	4–1	2–0	3–2		6–2	1–1	5–3	4–3
Larne	1–2	2–0	4–0	2–2	4–6	5–2	0–3	2–4	4–2	0–9		2–3	2–1	3–2
Linfield	7–2	2–1	2–1	1–2	4–1	3–0	3–0	1–1	3–1	0–2	3–1		4–1	7–1
Newry Town	0–1	5–1	0–1	5–5	2–4	1–3	2–0	1–8	0–1	1–5	2–2	1–5		2–1
Portadown	0–0	2–5	1–7	4–1	5–2	0–0	7–1	0–2	1–5	4–1	7–1	2–2	8–4	

Source: Irish League Archive
Legend: Blue = home team win; Yellow = draw; Red = away team win.
