= 1920–21 Irish League =

Irish League
- Season: 1920–21
- Dates: 6 November 1920 – 9 May 1921
- Champions: Glentoran; 6th Irish title
- Matches played: 20
- Goals scored: 54 (2.7 per match)
- Biggest home win: Glentoran 5–1 Distillery
- Biggest away win: Distillery 0–3 Glentoran
- Highest scoring: Glenavon 4–3 Distillery

The 1920–21 Irish League was the 27th edition of the Irish League, the highest level of league competition in Irish football.

The league comprised five teams, and Glentoran won the championship for the 6th time.

== Season summary ==
Although the Dublin-based teams that had competed the previous season had withdrawn from the league for this edition, this was the final season in which the Irish Football Association/Irish League had jurisdiction over the entire island of Ireland. The partition of Ireland process began in May 1921, and the League of Ireland was subsequently founded as an equivalent league competition for teams in Southern Ireland (present-day Republic of Ireland) for the following season. The Irish League continued as the highest level of league competition solely for teams based in Northern Ireland.

== Teams and locations ==
Location of teams in the 1920–21 Irish League
Location of Belfast teams in the 1920–21 Irish League

Team	Town	Home Ground
Cliftonville	Belfast	Solitude
Distillery	No home ground	
Glenavon	Lurgan	Mourneview Park
Glentoran	Belfast	The Oval
Linfield	Belfast	Windsor Park

== League standings ==
Pos	Team	Pld	W	D	L	GF	GA	GR	Pts	Result
1	Glentoran (C)	8	7	0	1	20	6	3.333	14	Champions
2	Glenavon	8	5	2	1	14	8	1.750	12	
3	Linfield	8	3	3	2	8	6	1.333	9	
4	Cliftonville	8	1	1	6	5	15	0.333	3	
5	Distillery	8	1	0	7	7	19	0.368	2	

Source: rsssf.com
(C) Champions

== Results ==
Home \ Away	CLI	DIS	GLV	GLT	LIN
Cliftonville		4–1	0–2	0–2	0–0
Distillery	2–0		0–1	0–3	0–1
Glenavon	3–0	4–3		3–1	0–0
Glentoran	2–0	5–1	3–0		1–0
Linfield	3–1	1–1	1–1	2–3	

Source: Irish League Archive
Legend: Blue = home team win; Yellow = draw; Red = away team win.
