= 1894–95 Irish League =

Irish League
- Season: 1894–95
- Dates: 1 September 1894 – 6 October 1894
- Champions: Linfield; 4th Irish title
- Matches: 12
- Goals: 50 (4.17 per match)
- Top goalscorer: George Gaukrodger; Joe McAllen (4 goals each)
- Biggest home win: Linfield 3–0 Glentoran
- Biggest away win: Cliftonville 0–5 Linfield
- Highest attendance: Distillery 4–3 Cliftonville

The 1894–95 Irish League was the 5th edition of the Irish League, the highest level of league competition in Irish football.

The league comprised four teams and Linfield won the championship for the fourth time.

== Season summary ==
Both Ligoniel and Ulster, who had competed in the previous season, did not participate this season. No new teams were elected, meaning the league proceeded with its smallest ever number of clubs with just four.

== Teams and locations ==
Location of the teams in the 1894–95 Irish League; all matches were played in Belfast

Team	Town	Home Ground
Cliftonville	Belfast	Solitude
Distillery	Belfast	Grosvenor Park
Glentoran	Belfast	The Oval
Linfield	Belfast	Ulsterville

== League standings ==
Pos	Team	Pld	W	D	L	GF	GA	GR	Pts	Result
1	Linfield (C)	6	4	2	0	18	6	3.000	10	Champions
2	Distillery	6	3	1	2	13	13	1.000	7	
3	Glentoran	6	1	2	3	9	14	0.643	4	
4	Cliftonville	6	1	1	4	10	17	0.588	3	

Source: rsssf.com
(C) Champions

== Results ==
Home \ Away	CLI	DIS	GLT	LIN
Cliftonville		1–2	2–2	0–5
Distillery	4–3		3–1	2–2
Glentoran	1–3	3–1		2–2
Linfield	3–1	3–1	3–0	

Source: Irish League Archive
Legend: Blue = home team win; Yellow = draw; Red = away team win.
