= 1937–38 Irish League =

Annual soccer tournament

Irish League
- Season: 1937–38
- Champions: Belfast Celtic; 11th Irish title
- Matches: 182
- Goals: 797 (4.38 per match)

Location of teams in the Irish League from 1934–40
Location of Belfast-based teams in the Irish League from 1934–40

The 1937–38 Irish League was the 44th edition of the Irish League, the highest level of league competition in Northern Irish football. The league comprised 14 teams, and Belfast Celtic won the championship after a play-off with Derry City.

== League standings ==
Pos	Team	Pld	W	D	L	GF	GA	GR	Pts	Result
1	Belfast Celtic (C)	26	18	5	3	88	24	3.667	41	Champions
2	Derry City	26	20	1	5	81	40	2.025	41	
3	Portadown	26	16	5	5	67	32	2.094	37	
4	Linfield	26	16	5	5	78	38	2.053	37	
5	Ballymena United	26	14	5	7	72	55	1.309	33	
6	Glentoran	26	15	2	9	64	57	1.123	32	
7	Newry Town	26	10	6	10	63	49	1.286	26	
8	Distillery	26	10	6	10	51	61	0.836	26	
9	Ards	26	7	4	15	43	66	0.652	18	
10	Glenavon	26	6	5	15	36	65	0.554	17	
11	Bangor	26	7	2	17	39	62	0.629	16	
12	Larne	26	6	3	17	48	87	0.552	15	
13	Coleraine	26	5	5	16	40	75	0.533	15	
14	Cliftonville	26	2	6	18	27	86	0.314	10	

Source: rsssf.com
(C) Champions

== Results ==
Home \ Away	ARD	BAN	BLM	BCE	CLI	COL	DER	DIS	GLV	GLT	LAR	LIN	NEW	POR
Ards		2–1	1–3	1–4	6–0	2–1	2–5	1–1	1–3	3–4	3–0	0–3	6–2	2–2
Bangor	1–3		0–3	1–2	3–2	2–1	1–2	3–3	1–2	2–1	4–3	1–2	2–0	1–2
Ballymena United	1–4	2–1		1–0	3–1	6–2	5–0	5–1	7–2	0–1	3–2	2–2	2–2	1–1
Belfast Celtic	6–0	4–0	3–1		8–0	4–1	6–1	3–3	6–0	6–1	5–1	2–1	1–1	4–0
Cliftonville	1–1	1–3	1–3	1–4		3–0	1–2	1–3	1–1	1–3	4–3	0–2	1–1	0–8
Coleraine	3–1	1–1	3–6	0–3	8–2		1–2	2–0	2–2	2–4	3–2	0–4	2–2	0–2
Derry City	3–0	4–1	9–1	1–0	4–0	4–0		3–0	2–0	3–0	7–1	7–1	3–1	3–0
Distillery	3–1	3–2	4–4	1–0	0–0	4–1	1–3		2–1	3–1	5–2	1–5	1–2	2–1
Glenavon	4–1	3–2	2–0	1–1	2–2	0–3	1–4	2–1		0–4	3–4	1–3	2–4	0–2
Glentoran	2–0	1–5	1–2	1–4	3–2	1–1	3–3	5–3	2–0		3–2	2–0	4–2	1–2
Larne	1–1	3–0	2–6	0–4	3–1	1–1	2–3	4–2	1–1	3–8		0–4	2–1	3–2
Linfield	6–0	4–1	1–1	0–2	1–1	8–0	6–1	2–2	3–2	5–2	6–3		4–1	2–5
Newry Town	4–1	5–0	5–2	3–3	6–0	5–0	4–1	1–2	4–1	2–3	4–0	0–2		0–0
Portadown	2–0	3–0	4–2	3–3	5–0	4–2	2–1	6–0	2–0	1–3	3–0	1–1	4–1	

Source: Irish League Archive
Legend: Blue = home team win; Yellow = draw; Red = away team win.

=== Test match ===
16 February 1938

Belfast Celtic	2–2	Derry City

The Oval, Belfast

=== Replay ===
25 April 1938

Belfast Celtic	3–1	Derry City

Windsor Park, Belfast
