= 1971–72 Irish League =

Irish League
- Season: 1971–72
- Champions: Glentoran; 15th Irish title
- Matches played: 132
- Goals scored: 475 (3.6 per match)
- Top goalscorer: Peter Watson; Des Dickson (20 goals each)

Location of teams in the Irish League from 1949–1972
Location of Belfast-based teams in the 1971–72 Irish League

The 1971–72 Irish League was the 71st edition of the Irish League, the highest level of league competition in Northern Irish football. The league consisted of 12 teams, and Glentoran won the championship.

== League standings ==
Pos	Team	Pld	W	D	L	GF	GA	GR	Pts	Qualification
1	Glentoran (C)	22	14	5	3	50	17	2.941	33	Qualification for the European Cup first round
2	Portadown	22	13	4	5	49	25	1.960	30	
3	Ards	22	12	5	5	49	30	1.633	29	
4	Linfield	22	10	7	5	48	29	1.655	27	
5	Crusaders	22	10	5	7	36	35	1.029	25	
6	Coleraine	22	9	7	6	51	40	1.275	25	
7	Ballymena United	22	8	5	9	34	34	1.000	21	
8	Distillery	22	7	7	8	34	44	0.773	21	
9	Glenavon	22	7	6	9	36	40	0.900	20	
10	Derry City	22	4	8	10	41	55	0.745	16	Withdrew
11	Bangor	22	2	5	15	28	62	0.452	9	
12	Cliftonville	22	2	4	16	19	64	0.297	8	

Source: rsssf.com
(C) Champions

== Results ==
Home \ Away	ARD	BAN	BLM	CLI	COL	CRU	DIS	DER	GLV	GLT	LIN	POR
Ards		3–1	1–0	8–1	4–2	1–0	2–4	1–2	1–0	2–0	1–1	4–3
Bangor	2–4		0–1	2–2	2–2	0–0	2–4	4–4	0–4	1–2	0–7	0–1
Ballymena United	1–1	2–1		2–0	3–2	4–2	0–0	1–1	2–3	1–2	2–1	1–6
Cliftonville	0–2	2–1	0–0		0–4	0–1	2–1	2–2	2–3	0–6	0–5	0–2
Coleraine	1–1	4–0	4–2	3–0		5–5	1–4	2–0	4–1	2–1	1–1	3–2
Crusaders	4–0	3–2	2–1	3–0	1–0		2–0	4–7	1–1	0–0	2–1	1–5
Distillery	1–4	2–4	2–0	4–4	3–3	0–0		2–0	1–1	0–6	2–1	0–3
Derry City	0–4	4–4	0–5	4–2	2–2	1–3	0–0		3–3	2–2	1–3	1–3
Glenavon	2–2	3–0	1–4	2–1	1–2	0–1	4–1	4–3		0–1	0–2	1–1
Glentoran	2–1	4–0	1–0	4–0	1–0	2–0	2–2	1–0	5–0		4–0	0–0
Linfield	1–1	3–0	2–2	2–1	3–3	4–1	3–0	0–2	2–1	2–2		2–2
Portadown	2–1	1–2	2–0	3–0	3–1	1–0	0–1	3–2	1–1	4–2	1–2	

Source: Irish League Archive
Legend: Blue = home team win; Yellow = draw; Red = away team win.
