= 1938–39 Irish League =

Irish League
- Season: 1938–39
- Champions: Belfast Celtic; 12th Irish title
- Matches: 182
- Goals: 837 (4.6 per match)

Location of teams in the Irish League from 1934–40
Location of Belfast-based teams in the Irish League from 1934–40

The 1938–39 Irish League was the 45th edition of the Irish League, the highest level of league competition in Northern Irish football. The league comprised 14 teams, and Belfast Celtic won the championship.

== League standings ==
Pos	Team	Pld	W	D	L	GF	GA	GR	Pts	Result
1	Belfast Celtic (C)	26	19	2	5	97	32	3.031	40	Champions
2	Ballymena United	26	15	5	6	63	54	1.167	35	
3	Derry City	26	15	3	8	84	47	1.787	33	
4	Portadown	26	15	3	8	84	56	1.500	33	
5	Linfield	26	14	2	10	58	40	1.450	30	
6	Glentoran	26	14	1	11	65	69	0.942	29	
7	Glenavon	26	12	4	10	67	57	1.175	28	
8	Ards	26	11	6	9	63	66	0.955	28	
9	Newry Town	26	9	8	9	43	48	0.896	26	
10	Distillery	26	9	4	13	53	56	0.946	22	
11	Larne	26	8	4	14	45	73	0.616	20	
12	Bangor	26	6	7	13	37	71	0.521	19	
13	Cliftonville	26	5	2	19	38	81	0.469	12	
14	Coleraine	26	3	3	20	40	87	0.460	9	

Source: rsssf.com
(C) Champions

== Results ==
Home \ Away	ARD	BAN	BLM	BCE	CLI	COL	DER	DIS	GLV	GLT	LAR	LIN	NEW	POR
Ards		2–0	2–6	2–3	5–2	4–4	3–1	4–2	4–2	2–1	3–2	4–1	4–2	3–3
Bangor	1–1		3–3	1–3	3–0	0–0	1–5	1–1	2–2	2–4	0–0	3–2	2–3	4–3
Ballymena United	1–1	2–3		0–8	7–2	4–0	1–0	3–0	1–1	1–0	7–3	2–1	1–0	2–4
Belfast Celtic	8–1	10–1	1–2		3–0	8–1	3–4	2–0	3–1	4–3	6–1	1–2	4–1	2–1
Cliftonville	4–3	1–2	0–3	1–10		5–2	1–5	3–2	2–3	4–3	1–4	0–3	0–0	0–2
Coleraine	2–5	2–0	1–2	0–1	0–4		1–3	1–2	4–1	3–5	2–3	2–4	1–1	3–1
Derry City	5–0	8–0	3–5	2–2	2–1	4–1		5–0	3–2	4–0	5–0	1–1	0–0	6–2
Distillery	2–0	7–1	0–0	1–0	2–1	5–2	1–4		1–2	4–5	6–0	0–2	3–3	2–2
Glenavon	2–4	1–1	7–0	2–1	2–1	5–2	3–2	5–1		2–3	4–3	6–2	2–2	5–2
Glentoran	2–1	3–2	1–3	1–6	4–2	4–0	4–2	2–0	4–3		3–1	3–2	0–0	2–9
Larne	2–2	1–0	2–2	1–1	4–0	4–3	4–2	0–2	3–0	2–5		1–4	0–1	3–2
Linfield	1–0	4–1	1–2	1–2	0–0	4–0	2–4	1–0	3–2	2–1	5–0		4–1	5–0
Newry Town	1–1	1–2	3–1	0–2	4–3	3–1	4–3	1–5	1–2	5–1	3–1	1–0		2–2
Portadown	6–2	2–1	7–2	2–3	3–0	5–2	5–1	6–4	2–0	3–1	4–0	3–1	3–0	

Source: Irish League Archive
Legend: Blue = home team win; Yellow = draw; Red = away team win.
