= 1953–54 Irish League =

Irish League
- Season: 1953–54
- Champions: Linfield; 21st Irish title
- Matches played: 132
- Goals scored: 554 (4.2 per match)
- Top goalscorer: Jimmy Jones (32 goals)

Location of teams in the Irish League from 1949–1972
Location of Belfast-based teams in the Irish League from 1949–1972

The 1953–54 Irish League was the 53rd edition of the Irish League, the highest level of league competition in Northern Irish football. The league comprised 12 teams, and Linfield won the championship.

== League standings ==
Pos	Team	Pld	W	D	L	GF	GA	GR	Pts	Result
1	Linfield (C)	22	15	6	1	56	26	2.154	36	Champions
2	Glentoran	22	17	1	4	67	34	1.971	35	
3	Glenavon	22	13	2	7	68	45	1.511	28	
4	Ballymena United	22	11	5	6	47	40	1.175	27	
5	Crusaders	22	11	4	7	60	49	1.224	26	
6	Bangor	22	10	2	10	34	42	0.810	22	
7	Coleraine	22	8	6	8	49	52	0.942	22	
8	Distillery	22	8	5	9	45	36	1.250	21	
9	Ards	22	6	2	14	32	53	0.604	14	
10	Derry City	22	5	3	14	36	50	0.720	13	
11	Portadown	22	5	2	15	34	60	0.567	12	
12	Cliftonville	22	3	2	17	26	67	0.388	8	

Source: rsssf.com
(C) Champions

== Results ==
Home \ Away	ARD	BAN	BLM	CLI	COL	CRU	DIS	DER	GLV	GLT	LIN	POR
Ards		1–3	1–2	4–2	1–4	3–2	1–0	3–2	3–4	0–4	1–2	4–1
Bangor	0–2		2–1	1–0	5–1	4–2	1–0	2–1	1–3	2–0	1–1	3–0
Ballymena United	2–0	2–0		2–0	5–1	1–2	1–1	5–2	4–4	1–4	2–2	1–4
Cliftonville	3–2	4–2	0–3		1–6	2–3	1–3	2–3	1–5	1–6	1–4	0–2
Coleraine	1–1	1–1	1–2	5–2		3–3	3–2	2–1	3–0	1–1	1–1	3–2
Crusaders	2–0	4–0	1–1	4–0	0–6		4–0	5–3	1–3	1–3	4–5	4–2
Distillery	2–2	6–0	4–0	1–2	5–2	3–3		3–2	5–2	2–3	0–1	2–2
Derry City	6–1	2–0	1–3	1–1	4–2	1–3	1–1		0–0	2–3	0–2	3–1
Glenavon	4–2	3–1	1–2	2–0	6–1	2–4	0–1	5–1		5–3	4–2	4–0
Glentoran	2–0	3–2	4–1	5–1	4–1	5–3	2–1	1–0	5–3		0–2	4–1
Linfield	4–0	3–0	3–3	1–1	4–0	1–1	2–1	3–0	2–1	3–2		2–1
Portadown	1–0	2–3	2–3	2–1	1–1	1–4	1–2	2–0	3–7	1–3	2–6	

Source: Irish League Archive
Legend: Blue = home team win; Yellow = draw; Red = away team win.
