= 1900–01 Irish League =

Irish League
- Season: 1900–01
- Dates: 1 September 1900 – 16 March 1901
- Champions: Distillery; 3rd Irish title
- Matches played: 30
- Goals scored: 109 (3.63 per match)
- Biggest home win: Distillery 9–0 Derry Celtic
- Biggest away win: Derry Celtic 0–6 Distillery
- Highest scoring: Distillery 9–0 Derry Celtic

The 1900–01 Irish League was the 11th edition of the Irish League, the highest level of league competition in Irish football.

The league comprised six teams, and Distillery won the championship for the 3rd time.

== Season summary ==
With the withdrawal of the Royal Scots during the previous season, there were only five teams left in membership of the league. As a result Derry Celtic were elected to the league in time for the 1900–01 league season, bringing back senior league football to Derry for the first time since the 1892–93 season when Derry Olympic competed.

== Teams and locations ==
Location of teams in the 1900–01 Irish League
Location of Belfast teams in the 1900–01 Irish League

Team	Town	Home Ground
Celtic	Belfast	Celtic Park
Cliftonville	Belfast	Solitude
Derry Celtic	Derry	Brandywell
Distillery	Belfast	Grosvenor Park
Glentoran	Belfast	The Oval
Linfield	Belfast	Balmoral

== League standings ==
Pos	Team	Pld	W	D	L	GF	GA	GR	Pts	Result
1	Distillery (C)	10	7	2	1	33	10	3.300	16	Champions
2	Glentoran	10	7	1	2	24	13	1.846	15	
3	Celtic	10	4	2	4	13	13	1.000	10	
4	Cliftonville	10	3	4	3	17	18	0.944	10	
5	Linfield	10	3	2	5	10	12	0.833	8	
6	Derry Celtic	10	0	1	9	12	43	0.279	1	

Source: rsssf.com
(C) Champions

== Results ==
Home \ Away	CEL	CLI	DCE	DIS	GLT	LIN
Celtic		1–1	6–2	1–1	1–0	1–0
Cliftonville	1–0		3–3	3–4	2–4	0–0
Derry Celtic	0–1	2–3		0–6	2–4	1–4
Distillery	4–1	1–1	9–0		3–1	3–0
Glentoran	3–1	3–1	3–1	3–1		0–0
Linfield	1–0	0–2	4–1	0–1	1–3	

Source: Irish League Archive
Legend: Blue = home team win; Yellow = draw; Red = away team win.
