= 1977–78 Irish League =

Irish League
- Season: 1977–78
- Champions: Linfield; 31st Irish title
- Matches played: 132
- Goals scored: 444 (3.36 per match)
- Top goalscorer: Warren Feeney (17 goals)

Location of teams in the Irish League from 1975–79
Location of Belfast-based teams in the Irish League from 1975–79

The 1977–78 Irish League was the 76th edition of the Irish League, the highest level of league competition in Northern Irish football. The league consisted of 12 teams. Linfield won the championship.

== League standings ==
Pos	Team	Pld	W	D	L	GF	GA	GD	Pts	Qualification
1	Linfield (C)	22	19	2	1	65	22	+43	40	Qualification for the European Cup first round
2	Glentoran	22	15	4	3	59	23	+36	34	Qualification for the UEFA Cup first round
3	Glenavon	22	13	2	7	38	30	+8	28	
4	Cliftonville	22	10	5	7	34	35	−1	25	
5	Portadown	22	8	5	9	42	34	+8	21	
6	Larne	22	10	1	11	31	31	0	21	
7	Ards	22	9	3	10	37	41	−4	21	
8	Coleraine	22	8	3	11	34	41	−7	19	
9	Distillery	22	6	4	12	32	59	−27	16	
10	Crusaders	22	6	3	13	25	46	−21	15	
11	Bangor	22	5	4	13	22	35	−13	14	
12	Ballymena United	22	4	2	16	22	44	−22	10	Qualification for the European Cup Winners' Cup first round

Source: rsssf.com
(C) Champions

== Results ==
Home \ Away	ARD	BAN	BLM	CLI	COL	CRU	DIS	GLV	GLT	LRN	LIN	POR
Ards		1–2	2–1	1–2	3–0	3–1	1–2	2–0	1–1	1–0	0–1	3–2
Bangor	1–2		2–2	1–1	1–0	4–1	0–1	1–1	0–4	2–3	1–1	2–1
Ballymena United	1–3	1–0		1–2	2–0	2–1	3–1	0–1	0–2	2–3	0–3	1–3
Cliftonville	1–1	2–0	3–0		1–4	1–0	3–2	0–4	3–1	0–1	1–3	2–1
Coleraine	2–0	2–1	3–0	1–2		1–2	3–1	3–2	1–1	1–0	0–4	3–3
Crusaders	1–2	2–0	2–1	2–2	1–1		1–2	0–5	3–3	1–0	0–3	2–0
Distillery	2–2	0–3	2–2	1–3	3–2	5–2		1–2	0–5	3–1	1–4	1–1
Glenavon	5–2	1–1	2–1	1–1	2–0	1–0	4–1		2–1	2–1	0–4	3–1
Glentoran	4–2	6–1	2–0	5–0	4–1	4–1	2–2	2–0		1–0	2–3	2–1
Larne	3–1	1–0	2–1	3–2	4–3	0–1	4–0	2–0	0–1		1–2	0–4
Linfield	6–4	2–0	2–1	3–0	4–2	3–1	7–1	4–2	1–2	1–0		2–2
Portadown	3–1	1–0	3–0	2–2	0–1	3–0	4–0	3–1	1–4	2–2	1–2	

Source: Irish League Archive
Legend: Blue = home team win; Yellow = draw; Red = away team win.
