= 1897–98 Irish League =

Irish League
- Season: 1897–98
- Dates: 4 September 1897 – 21 May 1898
- Champions: Linfield; 5th Irish title
- Matches: 30
- Goals: 117 (3.9 per match)
- Biggest home win: Cliftonville 8–0 North Staffs
- Biggest away win: Distillery 0–6 Glentoran
- Highest scoring: Cliftonville 8–0 North Staffs

The 1897–98 Irish League was the 8th edition of the Irish League, the highest level of league competition in Irish football.

The league comprised six teams, and Linfield won the championship for the 5th time.

== Teams and locations ==
Location of teams in the 1897–98 Irish League; all matches were played in Belfast

Team	Town	Home Ground
Celtic	Belfast	Celtic Park
Cliftonville	Belfast	Solitude
Distillery	Belfast	Grosvenor Park
Glentoran	Belfast	The Oval
Linfield	Belfast	Balmoral
North Staffordshire Regiment	No home ground	

== League standings ==
Pos	Team	Pld	W	D	L	GF	GA	GR	Pts	Result
1	Linfield (C)	10	8	1	1	22	10	2.200	17	Champions
2	Cliftonville	10	6	1	3	23	17	1.353	13	
3	Glentoran	10	6	1	3	31	12	2.583	13	
4	Celtic	10	3	1	6	15	19	0.789	7	
5	Distillery	10	2	1	7	13	28	0.464	5	
6	North Staffordshire Regiment	10	2	1	7	13	31	0.419	5	

Source: rsssf.com
(C) Champions

== Results ==
=== League ===
Home \ Away	CEL	CLI	DIS	GLT	LIN	NSR
Celtic		1–2	5–1	1–5	0–3	3–3
Cliftonville	1–0		4–3	1–1	0–1	8–0
Distillery	0–2	5–0		0–6	1–1	1–3
Glentoran	1–0	3–0	6–0		2–4	5–2
Linfield	2–1	2–4	1–0	2–1		3–0
North Staffordshire	1–2	1–3	0–2	2–1	1–3	

Source: Irish League Archive
Legend: Blue = home team win; Yellow = draw; Red = away team win.

=== 2nd/3rd place play-off ===
- Cliftonville 2–0 Glentoran
