= 1895–96 Irish League =

Irish League
- Season: 1895–96
- Dates: 7 September 1895 – 11 January 1896
- Champions: Distillery; 1st Irish title
- Matches: 12
- Goals: 54 (4.5 per match)
- Biggest home win: Distillery 6–1 Glentoran
- Biggest away win: Linfield 0–4 Cliftonville
- Highest scoring: Glentoran 6–2 Distillery

The 1895–96 Irish League was the 6th edition of the Irish League, the highest level of league competition in Irish football.

The league comprised four teams, and Distillery won the championship for the first time after a play-off with Cliftonville.

== Season summary ==
No clubs were excluded or elected to the league for this season, meaning the league again continued with four clubs. For the first time, the top two teams finished level on points, meaning a play-off (referred to contemporaneously as a "test match") was required. Played at Cliftonville's home ground Solitude, Distillery won the match 2–1 with two goals from Olphie Stanfield to win their first league title.

== Teams and locations ==
Location of teams in the 1895–96 Irish League; all matches were played in Belfast

Team	Town	Home Ground
Cliftonville	Belfast	Solitude
Distillery	Belfast	Grosvenor Park
Glentoran	Belfast	The Oval
Linfield	No home ground	

== League standings ==
Pos	Team	Pld	W	D	L	GF	GA	GR	Pts	Result
1	Distillery (C)	6	3	2	1	17	12	1.417	8	Champions
2	Cliftonville	6	3	2	1	14	9	1.556	8	
3	Linfield	6	2	1	3	10	14	0.714	5	
4	Glentoran	6	1	1	4	13	19	0.684	3	

Source: rsssf.com
(C) Champions

== Results ==
=== League ===
Home \ Away	CLI	DIS	GLT	LIN
Cliftonville		2–2	2–1	1–3
Distillery	2–2		6–1	2–1
Glentoran	1–3	6–2		2–4
Linfield	0–4	0–3	2–2	

Source: Irish League Archive
Legend: Blue = home team win; Yellow = draw; Red = away team win.

=== Championship play-off ===
11 January 1896

Distillery	2–1	Cliftonville
Stanfield	Report	Edwards

Solitude, Belfast
