= 1909–10 Irish League =

Irish League
- Season: 1909–10
- Dates: 4 September 1909 – 22 January 1910
- Champions: Cliftonville; 2nd Irish title
- Matches played: 56
- Goals scored: 160 (2.86 per match)
- Biggest home win: Belfast Celtic 5–0 Shelbourne; Glentoran 6–1 Bohemians
- Biggest away win: Glentoran 1–4 Belfast Celtic; Glentoran 1–4 Cliftonville
- Highest scoring: Derry Celtic 5–4 Glentoran

The 1909–10 Irish League was the 20th edition of the Irish League, the highest level of league competition in Irish football.

The league comprised eight teams, and Cliftonville won the championship for the 2nd time (1st time outright).

== Teams and locations ==
Location of teams in the 1909–10 Irish League season
Location of Belfast teams in the 1909–10 Irish League season
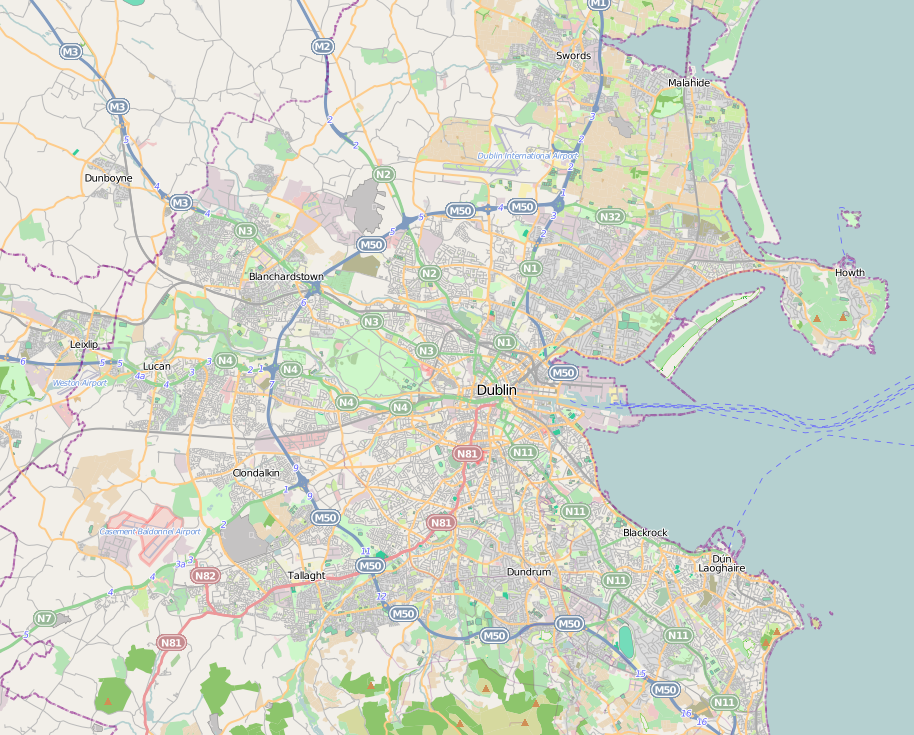
Location of Dublin teams in the 1909–10 Irish League

Team	Town	Home Ground
Belfast Celtic	Belfast	Celtic Park
Bohemians	Dublin	Dalymount Park
Cliftonville	Belfast	Solitude
Derry Celtic	Derry	Brandywell
Distillery	Belfast	Grosvenor Park
Glentoran	Belfast	The Oval
Linfield	Belfast	Windsor Park
Shelbourne	Dublin	Sandymount Road

== League standings ==
Pos	Team	Pld	W	D	L	GF	GA	GR	Pts	Result
1	Cliftonville (C)	14	8	4	2	25	15	1.667	20	Champions
2	Belfast Celtic	14	9	0	5	25	13	1.923	18	
3	Linfield	14	5	5	4	19	20	0.950	15	
4	Distillery	14	5	3	6	14	13	1.077	13	
5	Derry Celtic	14	4	5	5	19	21	0.905	13	
6	Bohemians	14	4	3	7	20	31	0.645	11	
7	Glentoran	14	5	1	8	23	23	1.000	11	
8	Shelbourne	14	2	7	5	15	24	0.625	11	

Source: rsssf.com
(C) Champions

== Results ==
Home \ Away	BCE	BOH	CLI	DCE	DIS	GLT	LIN	SHE
Belfast Celtic		1–0	2–0	2–1	0–1	2–0	1–2	5–0
Bohemians	1–3		4–3	1–2	1–0	2–1	1–1	2–2
Cliftonville	2–1	4–1		1–0	1–0	1–0	2–1	4–2
Derry Celtic	2–0	3–1	1–1		2–2	5–4	2–2	0–0
Distillery	0–1	0–1	1–1	2–0		0–1	1–0	3–0
Glentoran	1–4	6–1	1–4	1–0	1–2		4–0	2–0
Linfield	3–2	3–2	0–0	0–0	3–1	2–1		1–1
Shelbourne	0–1	2–2	1–1	4–1	1–1	0–0	2–1	

Source: Irish League Archive
Legend: Blue = home team win; Yellow = draw; Red = away team win.
