= 1967–68 Irish League =

Irish League

Irish League
- Season: 1967–68
- Champions: Glentoran; 13th Irish title
- Matches played: 132
- Goals scored: 637 (4.83 per match)
- Top goalscorer: Sammy Pavis (30 goals)

Location of teams in the Irish League from 1949–1972
Location of Belfast-based teams in the Irish League from 1949–1971

The 1967–68 Irish League was the 67th edition of the Irish League, the highest level of league competition in Northern Irish football. The league consisted of 12 teams, and Glentoran won the championship.

== League standings ==
Pos	Team	Pld	W	D	L	GF	GA	GR	Pts	Qualification
1	Glentoran (C)	22	17	3	2	79	24	3.292	37	Qualification for the European Cup first round
2	Linfield	22	16	4	2	85	32	2.656	36	Participated in the Inter-Cities Fairs Cup
3	Coleraine	22	15	5	2	76	33	2.303	35	
4	Ards	22	14	2	6	51	34	1.500	30	
5	Derry City	22	11	1	10	51	54	0.944	23	
6	Glenavon	22	9	4	9	51	45	1.133	22	
7	Ballymena United	22	8	3	11	55	63	0.873	19	
8	Crusaders	22	5	8	9	57	59	0.966	18	Qualification for the European Cup Winners' Cup first round
9	Portadown	22	8	1	13	34	57	0.596	17	
10	Distillery	22	6	1	15	33	62	0.532	13	
11	Bangor	22	3	3	16	39	89	0.438	9	
12	Cliftonville	22	2	1	19	26	85	0.306	5	

Source: Irish League Archive
(C) Champions

== Results ==
Home \ Away	ARD	BAN	BLM	CLI	COL	CRU	DIS	DER	GLV	GLT	LIN	POR
Ards		4–3	5–1	6–0	1–2	1–1	4–1	2–3	2–1	1–4	4–1	4–2
Bangor	2–4		4–4	3–2	0–5	4–4	0–1	1–5	2–3	0–5	0–4	3–2
Ballymena United	0–1	3–1		5–2	3–7	2–2	3–1	3–1	4–3	2–5	4–5	5–2
Cliftonville	4–2	6–4	1–5		0–4	1–3	0–3	0–1	2–8	0–5	1–4	2–2
Coleraine	1–2	2–3	7–2	5–1		2–2	3–1	3–1	4–1	1–0	5–5	7–1
Crusaders	3–1	5–5	3–1	6–2	1–5		3–3	3–5	2–2	0–2	1–3	10–3
Distillery	0–1	3–1	0–2	3–2	3–4	2–1		2–4	2–5	1–3	1–5	0–3
Derry City	6–1	2–0	3–1	5–0	1–1	2–1	5–1		2–1	1–6	0–2	1–2
Glenavon	5–1	3–1	3–1	3–1	0–0	4–4	0–1	0–1		0–2	1–6	2–1
Glentoran	4–2	10–1	2–2	5–0	2–2	2–1	4–1	3–0	4–2		2–2	4–1
Linfield	8–1	11–1	3–1	3–0	1–3	5–0	8–3	1–1	1–1	3–1		1–0
Portadown	2–1	1–0	2–1	1–0	2–3	2–1	2–1	0–1	1–3	1–4	1–3	

Source: Irish League Archive
Legend: Blue = home team win; Yellow = draw; Red = away team win.
