= 1951–52 Irish League =

Annual soccer tournament

Irish League
- Season: 1951–52
- Champions: Glenavon; 1st Irish title
- Matches played: 132
- Goals scored: 478 (3.62 per match)
- Top goalscorer: Jimmy Jones (27 goals)

Location of teams in the Irish League from 1949–1972
Location of Belfast-based teams in the Irish League from 1949–1972

The 1951–52 Irish League was the 51st edition of the Irish League, the highest level of league competition in Northern Irish football. The league comprised 12 teams, and Glenavon won the championship.

== League standings ==
Pos	Team	Pld	W	D	L	GF	GA	GR	Pts	Result
1	Glenavon (C)	22	17	3	2	67	19	3.526	37	Champions
2	Distillery	22	9	9	4	35	28	1.250	27	
3	Coleraine	22	11	5	6	44	33	1.333	27	
4	Glentoran	22	12	3	7	57	39	1.462	27	
5	Ballymena United	22	7	8	7	41	44	0.932	22	
6	Portadown	22	8	5	9	43	39	1.103	21	
7	Ards	22	8	4	10	43	49	0.878	20	
8	Derry City	22	7	5	10	33	44	0.750	19	
9	Crusaders	22	7	4	11	32	51	0.627	18	
10	Linfield	22	5	7	10	29	34	0.853	17	
11	Bangor	22	6	5	11	27	51	0.529	17	
12	Cliftonville	22	4	4	14	27	47	0.574	12	

Source: rsssf.com
(C) Champions

== Results ==
Home \ Away	ARD	BAN	BLM	CLI	COL	CRU	DIS	DER	GLV	GLT	LIN	POR
Ards		1–2	4–1	0–0	3–5	3–0	2–2	4–1	3–4	1–3	3–1	1–2
Bangor	2–3		5–4	2–1	1–1	0–2	0–0	1–1	0–3	1–1	1–6	3–2
Ballymena United	3–1	4–0		2–1	1–1	3–1	3–3	2–1	0–1	2–2	2–0	0–2
Cliftonville	4–3	1–0	2–2		1–3	2–1	1–2	2–2	1–4	2–3	0–1	2–1
Coleraine	0–1	4–2	5–1	3–1		7–2	2–1	2–1	1–1	2–1	1–0	1–3
Crusaders	1–3	5–2	1–1	1–0	1–1		0–1	3–0	0–3	0–1	0–5	2–1
Distillery	4–3	2–0	2–2	1–1	0–0	1–2		2–2	1–0	3–0	2–2	2–1
Derry City	4–0	0–1	2–2	3–0	3–2	2–3	0–2		0–3	3–1	2–1	2–1
Glenavon	1–1	1–0	2–1	6–2	5–0	5–0	1–2	5–0		8–3	5–0	2–2
Glentoran	8–1	6–0	1–3	3–1	3–2	4–1	3–0	4–0	1–2		4–3	2–2
Linfield	0–0	1–2	2–2	1–0	0–1	1–1	1–1	1–1	0–3	1–0		1–1
Portadown	1–2	2–2	5–0	3–2	1–0	5–5	2–1	2–3	1–2	1–3	2–1	

Source: Irish League Archive
Legend: Blue = home team win; Yellow = draw; Red = away team win.
