= 1960–61 Irish League =

Irish League
- Season: 1960–61
- Champions: Linfield; 25th Irish title
- Matches played: 132
- Goals scored: 598 (4.53 per match)
- Top goalscorer: Trevor Thompson (22 goals)

Location of teams in the Irish League from 1949–1972
Location of Belfast-based teams in the Irish League from 1949–1971

The 1960–61 Irish League was the 60th edition of the Irish League, the highest level of league competition in Northern Irish football. The league consisted of 12 teams, and Linfield won the championship after a 3-2 playoff win over Portadown.

== League standings ==
Pos	Team	Pld	W	D	L	GF	GA	GR	Pts	Qualification
1	Linfield (C)	22	14	4	4	65	34	1.912	32	Qualification for the European Cup preliminary round
2	Portadown	22	12	8	2	56	31	1.806	32	
3	Ards	22	14	3	5	66	39	1.692	31	
4	Glentoran	22	13	2	7	58	26	2.231	28	
5	Ballymena United	22	11	5	6	51	38	1.342	27	
6	Glenavon	22	10	5	7	51	42	1.214	25	Qualification for the European Cup Winners' Cup preliminary round
7	Crusaders	22	8	7	7	30	29	1.034	23	
8	Distillery	22	10	2	10	63	61	1.033	22	
9	Bangor	22	4	5	13	48	69	0.696	13	
10	Coleraine	22	5	3	14	46	68	0.676	13	
11	Derry City	22	5	2	15	31	68	0.456	12	
12	Cliftonville	22	3	0	19	33	93	0.355	6	

Source: rsssf.com
(C) Champions

== Results ==
Home \ Away	ARD	BAN	BLM	CLI	COL	CRU	DIS	DER	GLV	GLT	LIN	POR
Ards		4–2	1–1	6–3	7–2	2–0	3–0	5–1	3–2	2–1	1–4	0–2
Bangor	1–6		2–0	3–2	3–3	1–4	1–4	1–2	1–2	1–4	0–3	3–3
Ballymena United	1–1	5–2		8–2	1–3	1–1	1–5	3–0	6–0	2–1	2–1	3–3
Cliftonville	1–5	4–2	1–3		2–4	3–1	1–6	0–1	2–3	0–3	1–4	1–3
Coleraine	1–3	4–7	0–1	5–0		1–1	1–5	2–1	2–3	1–1	3–5	1–2
Crusaders	1–2	1–1	1–0	2–1	2–1		1–0	4–1	0–0	1–2	0–0	1–3
Distillery	3–2	2–2	3–4	9–2	5–3	1–1		7–2	0–2	1–7	5–4	0–4
Derry City	3–6	0–5	1–3	0–2	2–3	1–3	1–0		1–1	2–1	2–4	1–5
Glenavon	3–4	3–2	1–1	10–2	2–0	1–2	5–2	1–3		3–2	5–1	1–1
Glentoran	2–0	3–0	4–0	7–0	4–1	3–0	1–3	5–3	2–0		0–1	1–0
Linfield	2–2	3–0	1–2	3–0	5–3	1–1	8–1	5–1	3–1	3–2		3–1
Portadown	3–1	2–2	4–3	2–1	4–0	3–2	5–1	1–1	2–2	2–2	1–1	

Source: Irish League Archive
Legend: Blue = home team win; Yellow = draw; Red = away team win.

=== Test match ===
20 May 1961

Linfield	3–2	Portadown

The Oval, Belfast
