= 1978–79 Irish League =

Irish League
- Season: 1978–79
- Champions: Linfield; 32nd Irish title
- Matches played: 132
- Goals scored: 410 (3.11 per match)
- Top goalscorer: Tommy Armstrong (21 goals)

Location of teams in the Irish League from 1975–79
Location of Belfast-based teams in the Irish League from 1975–79

The 1978–79 Irish League was the 78th edition of the Irish League, the highest level of league competition in Northern Irish football. The league consisted of 12 teams, and Linfield won the championship.

== League standings ==
Pos	Team	Pld	W	D	L	GF	GA	GD	Pts	Qualification
1	Linfield (C)	22	14	6	2	46	21	+25	34	Qualification for the European Cup first round
2	Glenavon	22	11	6	5	42	30	+12	28	Qualification for the UEFA Cup first round
3	Ards	22	11	5	6	47	34	+13	27	
4	Glentoran	22	9	8	5	36	33	+3	26	
5	Portadown	22	10	5	7	35	27	+8	25	
6	Larne	22	10	4	8	42	35	+7	24	
7	Cliftonville	22	7	7	8	31	29	+2	21	Qualification for the European Cup Winners' Cup first round
8	Coleraine	22	7	6	9	29	30	−1	20	
9	Crusaders	22	6	8	8	30	33	−3	20	
10	Bangor	22	5	8	9	28	40	−12	18	
11	Ballymena United	22	4	6	12	25	46	−21	14	
12	Distillery	22	2	3	17	19	52	−33	7	

Source: rsssf.com
(C) Champions

== Results ==
Home \ Away	ARD	BAN	BLM	CLI	COL	CRU	DIS	GLV	GLT	LRN	LIN	POR
Ards		1–2	3–3	3–2	2–2	3–2	2–0	3–0	4–4	3–2	0–2	3–0
Bangor	2–5		0–0	0–0	3–1	2–0	2–0	2–6	0–0	1–3	0–2	1–3
Ballymena United	1–3	1–1		1–1	1–1	0–0	2–0	0–2	5–1	1–3	1–2	1–0
Cliftonville	2–1	3–0	5–0		2–0	1–0	3–0	1–3	2–4	0–1	0–3	1–1
Coleraine	1–2	1–1	1–2	1–1		5–0	0–1	4–3	0–0	0–3	0–0	3–0
Crusaders	1–0	2–2	4–0	2–2	1–0		5–2	1–0	0–2	2–2	1–4	1–2
Distillery	0–3	2–2	4–2	2–3	1–2	0–3		1–4	1–3	1–3	0–1	1–4
Glenavon	3–1	0–1	3–2	2–0	3–0	1–1	1–1		3–2	2–1	0–0	1–1
Glentoran	1–0	3–2	2–0	1–1	2–1	3–2	2–2	2–2		0–2	1–1	1–0
Larne	3–3	2–1	2–1	2–0	0–1	1–1	2–0	1–2	1–1		3–4	3–5
Linfield	1–2	2–2	6–1	2–1	2–3	1–1	2–0	0–0	2–1	3–1		3–1
Portadown	0–0	3–1	2–0	0–0	0–2	0–0	1–0	5–1	2–0	3–1	2–3	

Source: Irish League Archive
Legend: Blue = home team win; Yellow = draw; Red = away team win.
