= 1976–77 Irish League =

Irish League
- Season: 1976–77
- Champions: Glentoran; 16th Irish title
- Matches played: 132
- Goals scored: 408 (3.09 per match)
- Top goalscorer: Ronnie McAteer (20 goals)

Location of teams in the Irish League from 1975–79
Location of Belfast-based teams in the Irish League from 1975–79

The 1976–77 Irish League was the 76th edition of the Irish League, the highest level of league competition in Northern Irish football. The league consisted of 12 teams, and Glentoran won the championship.

== League standings ==
Pos	Team	Pld	W	D	L	GF	GA	GD	Pts	Qualification
1	Glentoran (C)	22	17	2	3	50	19	+31	36	Qualification for the European Cup first round
2	Glenavon	22	14	3	5	40	25	+15	31	Qualification for the UEFA Cup first round
3	Linfield	22	12	4	6	39	21	+18	28	
4	Larne	22	12	3	7	42	33	+9	27	
5	Coleraine	22	12	3	7	40	29	+11	27	Qualification for the European Cup Winners' Cup first round
6	Crusaders	22	9	5	8	39	33	+6	23	
7	Ards	22	10	1	11	34	39	−5	21	
8	Portadown	22	8	2	12	36	37	−1	18	
9	Ballymena United	22	5	5	12	20	34	−14	15	
10	Distillery	22	5	5	12	25	44	−19	15	
11	Bangor	22	4	5	13	23	43	−20	13	
12	Cliftonville	22	4	2	16	20	51	−31	10	

Source: rsssf.com
(C) Champions

== Results ==
Home \ Away	ARD	BAN	BLM	CLI	COL	CRU	DIS	GLV	GLT	LRN	LIN	POR
Ards		3–2	2–0	2–1	4–2	2–1	1–0	2–3	0–1	3–5	3–1	2–1
Bangor	0–2		1–1	4–2	3–2	2–2	1–2	0–2	1–4	3–3	0–3	1–0
Ballymena United	1–0	0–2		0–1	2–3	0–2	2–0	1–0	0–4	4–1	1–1	2–4
Cliftonville	0–1	1–1	0–1		0–0	0–3	0–2	1–3	1–3	2–1	2–1	1–2
Coleraine	2–0	2–0	3–2	3–1		3–0	0–0	3–2	0–0	3–0	1–3	3–1
Crusaders	4–3	1–1	4–1	6–2	0–2		1–1	1–2	2–0	2–1	0–2	2–1
Distillery	0–0	1–0	0–0	4–1	2–4	2–5		0–2	3–4	2–3	1–6	1–2
Glenavon	4–1	3–1	1–0	1–2	2–0	1–1	3–2		1–0	1–1	2–1	3–2
Glentoran	3–0	1–0	3–1	5–0	4–2	2–1	3–0	1–0		3–1	2–0	3–1
Larne	2–0	3–0	1–0	2–1	1–0	3–0	0–1	5–1	2–2		1–2	3–2
Linfield	3–1	2–0	0–0	4–0	1–0	0–0	1–1	0–3	3–0	0–1		4–2
Portadown	3–2	3–0	1–1	2–1	1–2	2–1	5–0	0–0	0–2	1–2	0–1	

Source: Irish League Archive
Legend: Blue = home team win; Yellow = draw; Red = away team win.
