= 1939–40 Irish League =

Irish League
- Season: 1939–40
- Champions: Belfast Celtic; 13th Irish title
- Matches played: 182
- Goals scored: 869 (4.77 per match)

Location of teams in the Irish League from 1934–40
Location of Belfast-based teams in the Irish League from 1934–40

The 1939–40 Irish League was the 46th edition of the Irish League, the highest level of league competition in Northern Irish football. The league comprised 14 teams, and Belfast Celtic won the championship.

== League standings ==
Pos	Team	Pld	W	D	L	GF	GA	GR	Pts	Result
1	Belfast Celtic (C)	26	20	5	1	91	18	5.056	45	Champions
2	Portadown	26	18	5	3	86	37	2.324	41	
3	Glentoran	26	19	1	6	104	46	2.261	39	
4	Ballymena United	26	15	4	7	82	52	1.577	34	
5	Linfield	26	14	5	7	63	47	1.340	33	
6	Derry City	26	14	2	10	73	46	1.587	30	
7	Glenavon	26	13	3	10	69	68	1.015	29	
8	Coleraine	26	11	2	13	47	68	0.691	24	
9	Ards	26	9	2	15	49	72	0.681	20	
10	Bangor	26	8	3	15	44	77	0.571	19	
11	Distillery	26	6	3	17	53	70	0.757	15	
12	Newry Town	26	5	5	16	32	86	0.372	15	
13	Larne	26	4	5	17	36	83	0.434	13	
14	Cliftonville	26	3	1	22	40	99	0.404	7	

Source: rsssf.com
(C) Champions

== Results ==
Home \ Away	ARD	BAN	BLM	BCE	CLI	COL	DER	DIS	GLV	GLT	LAR	LIN	NEW	POR
Ards		3–1	0–2	3–3	3–1	5–0	1–3	1–4	0–1	2–1	7–1	2–3	1–1	5–4
Bangor	2–5		2–2	1–3	3–1	4–2	1–3	1–0	5–1	0–4	4–1	2–0	4–1	1–2
Ballymena United	5–0	6–0		1–5	4–3	6–1	4–1	4–0	2–2	2–3	5–1	2–1	8–2	2–1
Belfast Celtic	3–0	6–0	3–3		6–2	6–1	3–0	4–0	4–2	4–2	0–0	5–0	12–0	0–0
Cliftonville	1–3	2–3	0–1	0–7		1–2	2–1	7–2	1–2	0–2	3–3	1–6	3–2	2–4
Coleraine	3–1	5–1	2–4	1–3	4–1		2–1	5–4	1–4	3–7	3–1	0–4	3–1	2–1
Derry City	6–2	5–2	5–2	0–0	6–1	0–0		2–1	9–0	3–2	6–0	1–2	4–1	3–5
Distillery	1–2	3–1	3–3	1–3	4–1	1–3	1–3		4–2	2–3	5–2	1–3	7–0	1–1
Glenavon	5–1	6–2	4–2	0–3	8–1	3–0	0–1	2–1		4–3	3–2	3–3	2–0	2–3
Glentoran	8–1	5–1	4–2	0–3	8–2	4–1	6–1	6–2	6–1		6–2	3–2	6–1	0–3
Larne	4–0	1–1	2–4	0–2	1–0	0–1	2–8	4–1	0–5	0–2		1–1	2–1	2–7
Linfield	4–0	1–1	2–1	0–2	5–1	3–1	1–0	3–1	5–5	1–2	3–1		3–0	0–5
Newry Town	2–0	3–0	1–3	0–1	3–1	1–1	2–0	1–1	3–2	1–9	1–1	3–4		1–1
Portadown	3–1	6–1	4–2	1–0	6–2	1–0	3–1	3–2	6–0	2–2	4–2	3–3	7–0	

Source: Irish League Archive
Legend: Blue = home team win; Yellow = draw; Red = away team win.
