= 1974–75 Irish League =

Irish League
- Season: 1974–75
- Champions: Linfield; 30th Irish title
- Matches played: 132
- Goals scored: 454 (3.44 per match)
- Top goalscorer: Martin Malone (15 goals)

Location of teams in the Irish League from 1972–75
Location of Belfast-based teams in the Irish League from 1972–75

The 1974–75 Irish League was the 74th edition of the Irish League, the highest level of league competition in Northern Irish football. The league consisted of 12 teams, and Linfield won the championship.

== League standings ==
Pos	Team	Pld	W	D	L	GF	GA	GR	Pts	Qualification
1	Linfield (C)	22	17	3	2	53	23	2.304	37	Qualification for the European Cup first round
2	Coleraine	22	15	2	5	58	25	2.320	32	Qualification for the European Cup Winners' Cup first round
3	Glentoran	22	14	3	5	52	30	1.733	31	Qualification for the UEFA Cup first round
4	Ballymena United	22	10	7	5	43	25	1.720	27	
5	Crusaders	22	11	5	6	46	30	1.533	27	
6	Bangor	22	8	6	8	37	35	1.057	22	
7	Portadown	22	8	5	9	29	37	0.784	21	
8	Larne	22	9	1	12	38	37	1.027	19	
9	Ards	22	7	3	12	28	43	0.651	17	
10	Glenavon	22	5	3	14	31	62	0.500	13	
11	Cliftonville	22	3	4	15	19	54	0.352	10	
12	Distillery	22	2	4	16	20	53	0.377	8	

Source: rsssf.com
(C) Champions

== Results ==
Home \ Away	ARD	BAN	BLM	CLI	COL	CRU	DIS	GLV	GLT	LRN	LIN	POR
Ards		1–0	0–0	3–2	1–3	0–1	3–0	4–1	1–2	1–4	2–6	1–1
Bangor	1–1		2–2	2–2	2–5	3–1	2–0	4–1	3–1	0–1	3–4	1–1
Ballymena United	1–2	1–2		4–0	2–1	0–0	2–0	8–0	1–2	4–2	1–1	2–0
Cliftonville	0–2	2–4	3–3		0–3	0–4	3–1	1–0	0–4	1–0	0–1	0–0
Coleraine	2–0	2–3	3–1	3–0		3–0	3–0	6–1	3–1	2–0	2–0	2–3
Crusaders	1–3	4–2	1–2	6–1	2–2		2–1	5–0	2–3	2–1	0–2	2–0
Distillery	2–0	0–1	1–1	1–1	2–2	2–4		0–2	0–3	1–2	0–2	1–2
Glenavon	3–1	2–1	2–3	3–2	0–2	0–0	3–3		2–4	1–4	2–3	3–1
Glentoran	4–0	0–0	1–1	4–0	3–1	1–4	5–1	0–0		5–1	1–0	2–0
Larne	4–0	1–1	0–1	2–0	2–3	1–2	0–2	4–2	2–3		0–2	2–0
Linfield	3–1	2–0	2–1	3–1	2–1	1–1	5–1	2–1	4–1	4–2		2–2
Portadown	2–1	1–0	0–2	1–0	0–4	2–2	5–1	4–2	4–2	0–3	0–2	

Source: Irish League Archive
Legend: Blue = home team win; Yellow = draw; Red = away team win.
