= 1980–81 Irish League =

Irish League
- Season: 1980–81
- Champions: Glentoran; 17th Irish title
- Matches played: 132
- Goals scored: 406 (3.08 per match)
- Top goalscorer: Des Dickson; Paul Malone (18 goals each)

Location of teams in the Irish League from 1980–83
Location of Belfast-based teams in the Irish League from 1980–83

The 1980–81 Irish League was the 80th edition of the Irish League, the highest level of league competition in Northern Irish football. The league consisted of 12 teams, and Glentoran won the championship.

== League standings ==
Pos	Team	Pld	W	D	L	GF	GA	GD	Pts	Qualification
1	Glentoran (C)	22	15	7	0	59	26	+33	37	Qualification for the European Cup first round
2	Linfield	22	16	3	3	57	15	+42	35	Qualification for the UEFA Cup first round
3	Ballymena United	22	12	4	6	33	21	+12	28	Qualification for the European Cup Winners' Cup first round
4	Crusaders	22	9	6	7	28	26	+2	24	
5	Ards	22	9	6	7	35	40	−5	24	
6	Glenavon	22	7	8	7	37	37	0	22	
7	Larne	22	9	4	9	26	26	0	22	
8	Portadown	22	8	5	9	30	34	−4	21	
9	Coleraine	22	5	8	9	28	36	−8	18	
10	Cliftonville	22	5	5	12	20	37	−17	15	
11	Bangor	22	4	5	13	35	54	−19	13	
12	Distillery	22	1	3	18	18	54	−36	5	

Source: rsssf.com
(C) Champions

== Results ==
Home \ Away	ARD	BAN	BLM	CLI	COL	CRU	DIS	GLV	GLT	LRN	LIN	POR
Ards		2–2	0–1	0–0	4–2	2–0	2–0	2–2	1–1	2–0	1–1	2–0
Bangor	3–4		3–1	6–1	3–5	0–2	3–1	1–1	2–3	0–2	1–3	1–1
Ballymena United	3–2	5–1		4–3	2–0	1–1	2–0	1–1	1–2	1–0	1–0	2–0
Cliftonville	3–0	1–1	1–1		3–2	0–0	1–0	0–2	2–4	2–4	0–2	0–2
Coleraine	0–1	2–0	0–0	0–0		0–1	1–1	3–3	1–1	0–0	1–2	2–5
Crusaders	8–2	2–0	1–0	1–0	0–1		1–0	3–1	1–1	1–2	2–2	1–1
Distillery	1–2	0–2	1–2	1–0	2–2	1–1		3–4	1–7	0–2	0–6	1–2
Glenavon	1–1	2–2	2–1	1–2	1–2	4–0	2–1		1–2	2–1	0–3	2–1
Glentoran	4–3	3–2	2–0	2–0	1–1	3–1	4–2	3–1		1–1	2–1	2–2
Larne	0–2	3–1	0–3	2–0	2–0	0–1	2–0	2–2	0–3		0–2	1–1
Linfield	5–0	7–0	1–1	0–1	4–1	4–0	4–2	2–1	1–1	1–0		2–1
Portadown	3–0	3–1	0–1	2–0	0–2	1–0	2–0	1–1	1–7	1–2	0–4	

Source: Irish League Archive
Legend: Blue = home team win; Yellow = draw; Red = away team win.
