= 1911–12 Irish League =

Irish League
- Season: 1911–12
- Dates: 2 September 1911 – 23 December 1911
- Champions: Glentoran; 4th Irish title
- Matches played: 56
- Goals scored: 182 (3.25 per match)
- Biggest home win: Glentoran 10–0 Cliftonville
- Biggest away win: Glenavon 1–5 Glentoran
- Highest scoring: Glentoran 10–0 Cliftonville

The 1911–12 Irish League was the 22nd edition of the Irish League, the highest level of league competition in Irish football.

The league comprised eight teams, and Glentoran won the championship for the 4th time.

== Season summary ==
Bohemians, who had been members of the league since 1902, withdrew for this season. Their place was taken by Irish Junior League champions Glenavon, who became the first Irish League team from outside a city in Ireland.

== Teams and locations ==
Location of teams in the 1911–12 Irish League season
Location of Belfast teams in the 1911–12 Irish League season

Team	Town	Home Ground
Belfast Celtic	Belfast	Celtic Park
Cliftonville	Belfast	Solitude
Derry Celtic	Derry	Brandywell
Distillery	Belfast	Grosvenor Park
Glenavon	Lurgan	Mourneview Park
Glentoran	Belfast	The Oval
Linfield	Belfast	Windsor Park
Shelbourne	Dublin	Sandymount Road

== League standings ==
Pos	Team	Pld	W	D	L	GF	GA	GR	Pts	Result
1	Glentoran (C)	14	11	2	1	45	13	3.462	24	Champions
2	Distillery	14	9	3	2	32	14	2.286	21	
3	Belfast Celtic	14	7	6	1	21	11	1.909	20	
4	Linfield	14	6	4	4	25	16	1.563	16	
5	Derry Celtic	14	5	1	8	16	29	0.552	11	
6	Shelbourne	14	2	3	9	12	33	0.364	7	
7	Cliftonville	14	3	1	10	14	36	0.389	7	
8	Glenavon	14	2	2	10	17	30	0.567	6	

Source: rsssf.com
(C) Champions

== Results ==
Home \ Away	BCE	CLI	DCE	DIS	GLV	GLT	LIN	SHE
Belfast Celtic		0–0	4–1	1–1	1–0	1–3	2–1	1–1
Cliftonville	0–2		0–1	4–5	2–1	0–1	1–2	1–0
Derry Celtic	0–2	4–2		1–3	4–3	1–1	1–0	1–0
Distillery	1–1	5–0	3–1		3–0	2–3	0–0	4–1
Glenavon	0–2	3–1	2–0	0–1		1–5	1–3	0–1
Glentoran	1–1	10–0	2–0	2–1	3–2		1–0	7–0
Linfield	2–2	3–2	5–1	0–1	2–2	2–1		5–1
Shelbourne	0–1	2–1	2–0	0–2	2–2	2–5	0–0	

Source: Irish League Archive
Legend: Blue = home team win; Yellow = draw; Red = away team win.
