= 1948–49 Irish League =

Irish League
- Season: 1948–49
- Champions: Linfield; 19th Irish title
- Matches: 132
- Goals: 536 (4.06 per match)
- Top goalscorer: Billy Simpson (19 goals)

Location of teams in the 1948–49 Irish League
Location of Belfast-based teams in the 1948–49 Irish League

The 1948–49 Irish League was the 48th edition of the Irish League, the highest level of league competition in Northern Irish football. The league comprised 12 teams, and Linfield won the championship.

== League standings ==
Pos	Team	Pld	W	D	L	GF	GA	GR	Pts	Result
1	Linfield (C)	22	16	4	2	58	21	2.762	36	Champions
2	Belfast Celtic	22	14	3	5	69	32	2.156	31	Withdrew
3	Glentoran	22	13	3	6	45	28	1.607	29	
4	Cliftonville	22	9	5	8	44	38	1.158	23	
5	Bangor	22	8	5	9	43	45	0.956	21	
6	Distillery	22	9	3	10	51	56	0.911	21	
7	Portadown	22	8	4	10	41	48	0.854	20	
8	Glenavon	22	6	8	8	35	43	0.814	20	
9	Derry City	22	8	3	11	40	52	0.769	19	
10	Ballymena United	22	6	7	9	39	58	0.672	19	
11	Ards	22	7	2	13	46	49	0.939	16	
12	Coleraine	22	4	1	17	25	66	0.379	9	

Source: rsssf.com
(C) Champions

== Results ==
Home \ Away	ARD	BAN	BLM	BCE	CLI	COL	DIS	DER	GLV	GLT	LIN	POR
Ards		2–4	8–0	4–4	1–2	7–0	0–1	3–1	0–2	2–1	0–4	2–2
Bangor	2–3		2–2	0–1	2–1	1–0	5–2	4–1	1–1	3–0	3–3	2–3
Ballymena United	1–0	1–1		0–5	3–4	5–2	7–5	3–2	0–0	1–1	0–3	1–1
Belfast Celtic	4–3	3–0	3–2		4–3	4–0	10–2	8–0	3–1	0–3	0–1	5–1
Cliftonville	3–2	2–2	1–1	2–5		6–0	2–1	1–1	5–2	1–0	1–3	5–0
Coleraine	4–1	3–1	1–2	1–0	3–0		0–6	1–2	1–1	1–3	0–2	2–4
Distillery	2–1	5–0	6–2	1–2	0–1	2–0		2–3	2–0	2–1	3–2	2–2
Derry City	2–3	3–1	1–2	4–3	2–1	7–1	2–2		1–2	0–1	1–3	3–2
Glenavon	1–2	4–2	2–2	1–0	2–2	4–1	2–2	4–1		1–2	0–3	2–2
Glentoran	2–0	2–1	4–2	0–0	2–0	3–2	4–1	2–2	7–1		1–4	2–1
Linfield	5–1	1–2	4–2	1–1	0–0	3–1	5–2	3–0	1–1	2–0		3–1
Portadown	2–1	2–4	2–0	2–4	2–1	2–1	5–0	0–1	3–1	1–4	1–2	

Source: Irish League Archive
Legend: Blue = home team win; Yellow = draw; Red = away team win.
