= Sammy Hughes (footballer) =

Association footballer from Northern Ireland

Personal information
- Full name: Samuel Hughes
- Date of birth: 1925 or 1926
- Place of birth: Ballymena, Northern Ireland
- Date of death: 28 April 2011
- Position: Centre forward

Senior career*
Years	Team	Apps	(Gls)
1949–1959	Glentoran	378	(297)
- Larne
- Carrick Rangers
- * Club domestic league appearances and goals

Sammy Hughes (1925/1926 – 28 April 2011) was a footballer who played in the Irish League with Glentoran in the 1950s. He signed from Larne in September 1949, He won two Irish League championships (1950/51 and 1952/53), one Irish Cup (1950/51), one Gold Cup, three City Cups and two Ulster Cups. He was capped eight times by the Irish League and scored five goals. He was the Ulster Footballer of the Year for the 1952/53 season. He later played for Larne and Carrick Rangers, winning the B Division title with the latter in 1961/62.

Hughes was a top scorer in the Irish League in the 1949–50, 1950–51 and 1952–1953 seasons.

He died on 28 April 2011, aged 85.

== See also ==
- List of men's footballers with 500 or more goals

== Sources ==
- Northern Ireland's Footballing Greats
