= Privacy regulation theory =

Privacy regulation theory was developed by social psychologist Irwin Altman in 1975 to explain why people sometimes prefer staying alone but at other times enjoy being involved in social interactions, describing privacy as "a selective control of access to the self or to one's group". In order to regulate our privacy (i.e., social interaction) successfully, Altman argued people need to use a variety of behavioral mechanisms such as verbal, paraverbal and non-verbal behavior, environmental mechanisms of territoriality and personal space, etc. By combining these behavioral mechanisms (i.e., techniques), people can effectively express our desired privacy level to others in order to achieve the "optimum level of privacy".

== Theory Explanation ==
Traditionally, privacy is regarded as a state of social withdrawal (i.e., avoiding people). Altman, however, regards it as a dialectic and dynamic boundary regulation process where privacy is not static but "a selective control of access to the self or to one’s group" (p. 18). According to Altman, "dialectic" refers to the openness and closeness of self to others (i.e., seeking and avoiding social interaction); while "dynamics" indicates that the desired privacy level (i.e., the ideal level of contact at a particular time), which varies due to individual and cultural differences, continuously moves along the continuum of openness and closeness in response to different circumstances over time. In other words, the desired privacy level changes with time according to environment. Therefore, we might want to avoid people at a particular time but desire contact at another time.

Altman also believes the goal of privacy regulation is to achieve the optimum level of privacy (i.e., the ideal level of social interaction). In this optimizing process, we all strive to match the achieved privacy (i.e. the actual level of contact at a specific time) with the desired one. At the optimum level of privacy, we can experience the desired solitude when we want to be alone or enjoy the desired social contact when we want to be with people. However, if our actual level of privacy is greater than the desired one, we will feel lonely or isolated; on the other hand, if our actual level of privacy is smaller than the desired one, we will feel annoyed or crowded.

According to Altman, if we effectively control the openness and closeness of self to others (i.e., make ourselves more or less available to others) in response to our desire and the environment, we can function better in society than those who cannot.

== Five properties of Privacy Regulation Theory ==
There are five properties in Altman's theory.

=== Temporal dynamic process of interpersonal boundary ===
First, Altman states that privacy is a temporal dynamic process of interpersonal boundary. That is a process that we regulate interactions with others, we changed how open or closed we are in response to changes in our internal states and external conditions.

=== Desired and actual levels of privacy ===
Second, Altman differentiates desired and actual levels of privacy. The desired level of privacy is the amount required for serving a person's needs and role requirement.

Actual level refers the amount of privacy that a person achieves.

=== Non-monotonic function of privacy ===
Third, privacy is described as a non-monotonic function. More privacy is not necessarily better. A person seeks an optimal level of privacy (i.e. desired level equals to actual level).There are possibilities of too much or too little privacy. When there is too much privacy (actual desired level), a person may engage in crowding. On the other hand, when there is too little privacy (desired > actual level), a person may prefer social isolation. The goal of privacy regulation is to obtain the optimal level.

=== Bi-directional nature of privacy ===
Fourth, privacy is bi-directional, involving inputs from others (e.g., noise) and outputs to others (e.g., oral communication).

=== Two levels of privacy ===
Last, privacy can be analyzed at two different levels. One refers to an individual's privacy, the other is a group's privacy.

== Contribution and implication of Altman’s privacy regulation theory ==
Privacy regulation theory contributed a new perspective on human-environment interaction using spatial behavior technique to regulate social interaction. Altman proposed a new perspective to understand privacy in terms of multiple unit level (individual vs group; ingroup and outgroup; self vs others; across time and condition etc.) and its operating mechanism. It is a dynamic analysis of how people regulate social interaction.

The theory challenged traditional beliefs that "privacy" was a rather personal process. He proposed that it was intrinsically a social process. It was a psychological process involved people's interaction, their social world and environment. It stimulated researchers to think about self disclosure and privacy regulations; an example is Petronio's study on communication privacy management. In addition, privacy was culturally defined and the behavior was influenced by its context. Altman's theory stimulated more researches on privacy across different settings such as living area, schools, hospitals, prisons, public areas, residential home, banks etc. and across different ages.

== Application of the privacy regulation theory ==
Although Altman (1995) proposed privacy regulation theory well before the cyber age, recent studies have applied the theory to suggest new ways for thinking about privacy in sociotechnical environments. With information technology, privacy extended from physical space to virtual space. Privacy management is a dynamic mechanism of balance between boundaries as the context changes. The virtual space created new context.
