= Solitude =

State of seclusion or isolation of a person

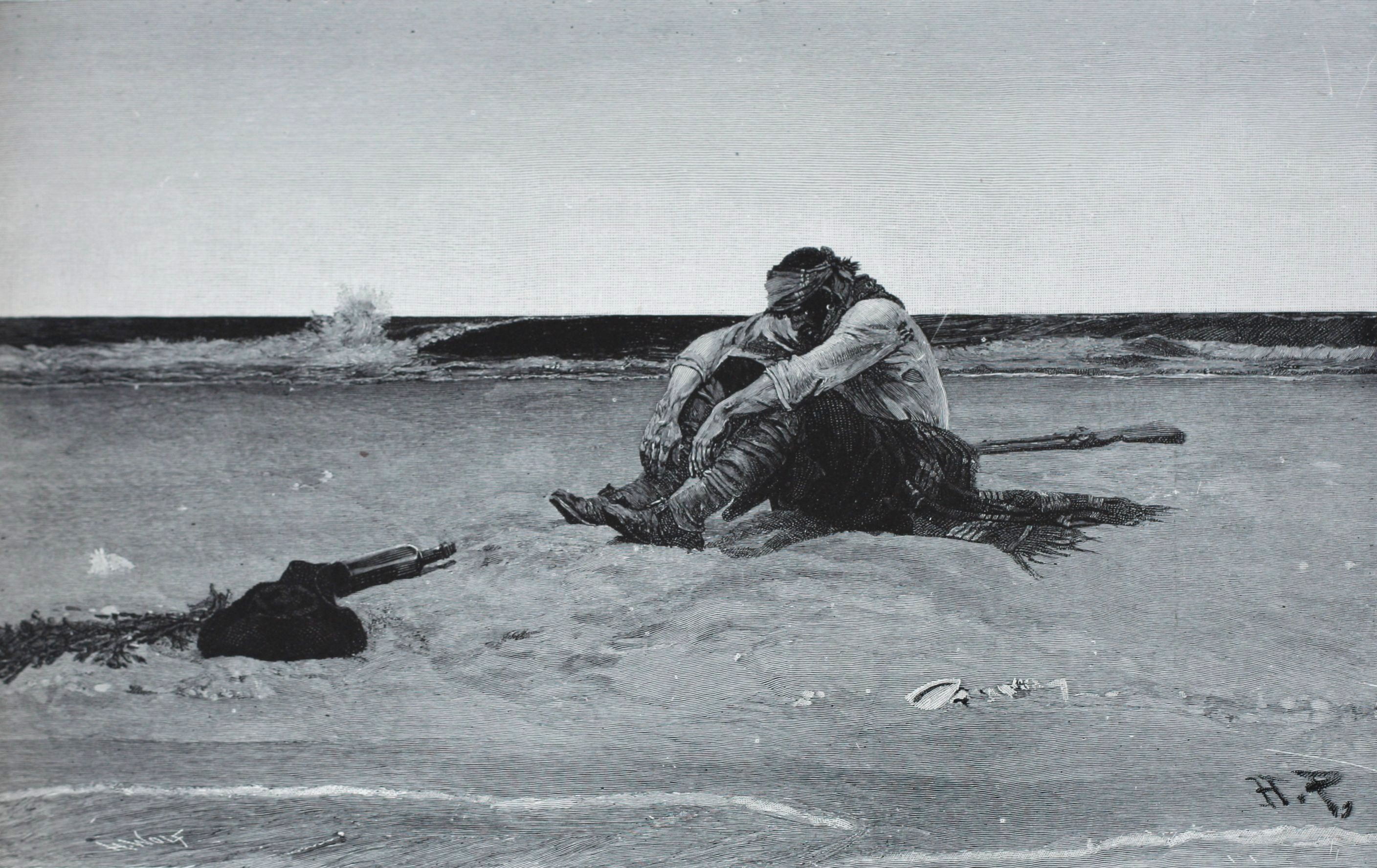
Howard Pyle's 19th century illustration of a marooned pirate

Solitude, also known as social withdrawal, is a state of seclusion or isolation, meaning lack of socialisation. Effects can be either positive or negative, depending on the situation. Short-term solitude is often valued as a time when one may work, think, or rest without disturbance. It may be desired for the sake of privacy. Long-term solitude may stem from soured relationships, loss of loved ones, deliberate choice, infectious disease, mental disorders, neurological disorders such as circadian rhythm sleep disorder, or circumstances of employment or situation.

A distinction has been made between solitude and loneliness. In this sense, these two words refer, respectively, to the joy and the pain of being alone.

== Health effects ==
Symptoms from complete isolation, called sensory deprivation, may include anxiety, sensory illusions, or distortions of time and perception. However, this is the case when there is no stimulation of the sensory systems at all and not just lack of contact with people. Thus, this can be avoided by having other things to keep one's mind busy.

Long-term solitude is often seen as undesirable, causing loneliness or reclusion resulting from inability to establish relationships. Furthermore, it might lead to clinical depression, although some people do not react to it negatively. Buddhist monks regard long-term solitude as a means of enlightenment. Marooned people have been left in solitude for years without any report of psychological symptoms afterwards. Some psychological conditions (such as schizophrenia and schizoid personality disorder) are strongly linked to a tendency to seek solitude.

Enforced loneliness (solitary confinement) has been a punishment method throughout history. It is often considered a form of torture.

Emotional isolation is a state of isolation where one feels emotionally separated from others despite having a well-functioning social network.

Researchers, including Robert J. Coplan and Julie C. Bowker, have rejected the notion that solitary practices and solitude are inherently dysfunctional and undesirable. In their 2013 book A Handbook of Solitude, the authors note how solitude can allow for enhancements in self-esteem, generates clarity, and can be highly therapeutic. In the edited work, Coplan and Bowker invite not only fellow psychology colleagues to chime in on this issue but also a variety of other faculty from different disciplines to address the issue. The sociologist Jack Fong offers an alternative view on how solitude is more than just a personal trajectory for one to take inventory on life; it also yields a variety of important sociological cues that allow the protagonist to navigate through society, even highly politicized societies. Thus Fong, Coplan, and Bowker conclude that a person's experienced solitude generates immanent and personal content as well as collective and sociological content, depending on context.

== Psychological effects ==
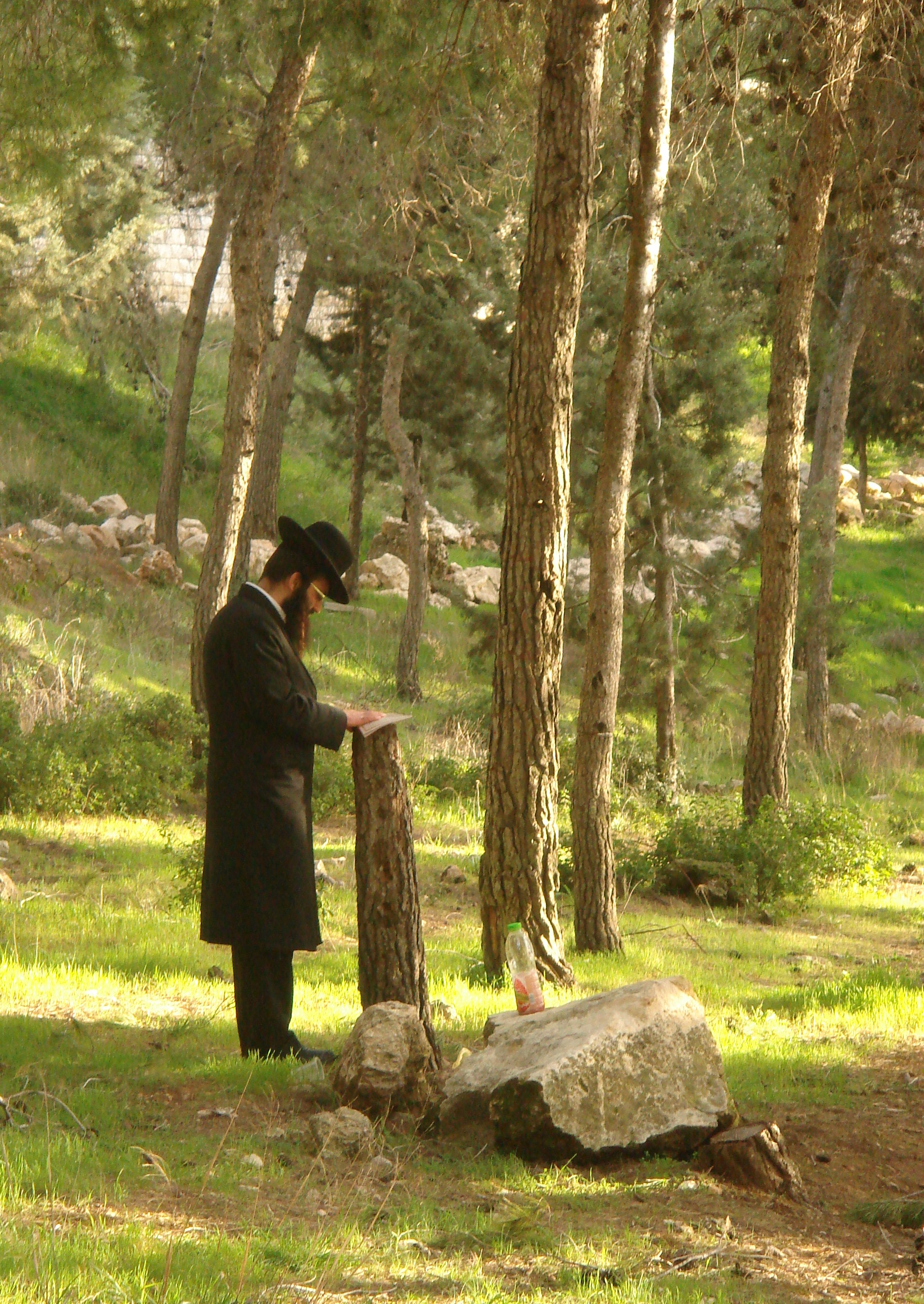
Breslover Hasid practicing hitbodedut.

There are both positive and negative psychological effects of solitude. Much of the time, these effects and the longevity is determined by the amount of time a person spends in isolation. The positive effects can range anywhere from more freedom to increased spirituality, while the negative effects are socially depriving and may trigger the onset of mental illness. While positive solitude is often desired, negative solitude is often involuntary or undesired at the time it occurs.

=== Positive effects ===
Freedom is considered to be one of the benefits of solitude; the constraints of others will not have any effect on a person who is spending time in solitude, therefore giving the person more latitude in their actions. With increased freedom, a person’s choices are less likely to be affected by exchanges with others.

A person's creativity can be sparked when given freedom. Solitude can increase freedom and moreover, freedom from distractions has the potential to spark creativity. In 1994, psychologist Mihaly Csikszentmihalyi found that adolescents who cannot bear to be alone often stop enhancing creative talents.

Another proven benefit to time given in solitude is the development of the self. When a person spends time in solitude from others, they may experience changes to their self-concept. This can also help a person to form or discover their identity without any outside distractions. Solitude also provides time for contemplation, growth in personal spirituality, and self-examination. In these situations, loneliness can be avoided as long as the person in solitude knows that they have meaningful relations with others.

Writer Francesca Specter coined the term "alonement" in 2019 to mean a form of intentional solitude.

=== Negative effects ===
Negative effects have been observed in prisoners. The behavior of prisoners who spend extensive time in solitude may worsen. Solitude can trigger physiological responses that increase health risks.

Negative effects of solitude may also depend on age. Elementary age school children who experience frequent solitude may react negatively. This is largely because often, solitude at this age is not the child's choice. Solitude in elementary-age children may occur when they are unsure of how to interact socially, so they prefer to be alone, causing shyness or social rejection.

While teenagers are more likely to feel lonely or unhappy when not around others, they are also more likely to have a more enjoyable experience with others if they have had time alone first. However, teenagers who frequently spend time alone do not have as good a global adjustment as those who balance their time of solitude with their time of socialization.

== Other uses ==
=== As pleasure ===
Solitude does not necessarily entail feelings of loneliness, and it may in fact be one's sole source of genuine pleasure for those who choose it with deliberate intent. Some individuals seek solitude for discovering a more meaningful and vital existence. For example, in religious contexts, some saints preferred silence, finding immense pleasure in their uniformity with God. Solitude is a state that can be positively modified utilizing it for prayer allowing to "be alone with ourselves and with God, to put ourselves in listening to His will, but also of what moves in our hearts, let purify our relationships; solitude and silence thus become spaces inhabited by God, and ability to recover ourselves and grow in humanity."

In psychology, introverted persons may require spending time alone to recharge, whereas those who are simply socially apathetic might find it a pleasurable setting in which to occupy oneself with solitary tasks.

The Buddha attained enlightenment through uses of meditation, deprived of sensory input, bodily necessities, and external desires, including social interaction. The context of solitude is attainment of pleasure from within, but this does not necessitate complete detachment from the external world.

This is well demonstrated in the writings of Edward Abbey with particular regard to Desert Solitaire where solitude focused only on isolation from other people allows for a more complete connection to the external world, as in the absence of human interaction the natural world itself takes on the role of the companion. In this context, the individual seeking solitude does so not strictly for personal gain or introspection, though this is often an unavoidable outcome, but instead in an attempt to gain an understanding of the natural world as entirely removed from the human perspective as possible, a state of mind much more readily attained in the complete absence of outside human presence.

=== As punishment ===
Isolation in the form of solitary confinement is a punishment or precaution used in many countries throughout the world for prisoners accused of serious crimes, those who may be at risk in the prison population, those who may commit suicide, or those unable to participate in the prison population due to sickness or injury. Research has found that solitary confinement does not deter inmates from committing further violence in prison.

Psychiatric institutions may institute full or partial isolation for certain patients, particularly the violent or subversive, in order to address their particular needs and to protect the rest of the recovering population from their influence.

== See also ==
- Boredom
- Existential isolation
- Hermit
- Hikikomori
- Hitbodedut
- Loner
- Privacy regulation theory
- Solitude (painting)
- Touch starvation
