= Knapp's relational development model =

Ten-step relational development model

Knapp's relational development model portrays relationship development as a ten step process, broken into two phases. Created by and named after communication scholar Mark L. Knapp, the model suggests that all of the steps should be done one at a time, in sequence, to make sure they are effective. However, not every relationship will go through these stages of development in the same way. Compared to DeVito's six-stage model of relational development, Knapp's model is far more prescriptive and detailed, but also presupposes that the relationship will ultimately dissolve, as evident in the five "coming apart" stages that make up the second half of the model. However, Knapp himself has said that his model is also descriptive; the model describes what seems to happen, not necessarily what should happen. The model proposes that coming apart need not be seen as inherently bad, just as coming together need not be seen as inherently good.

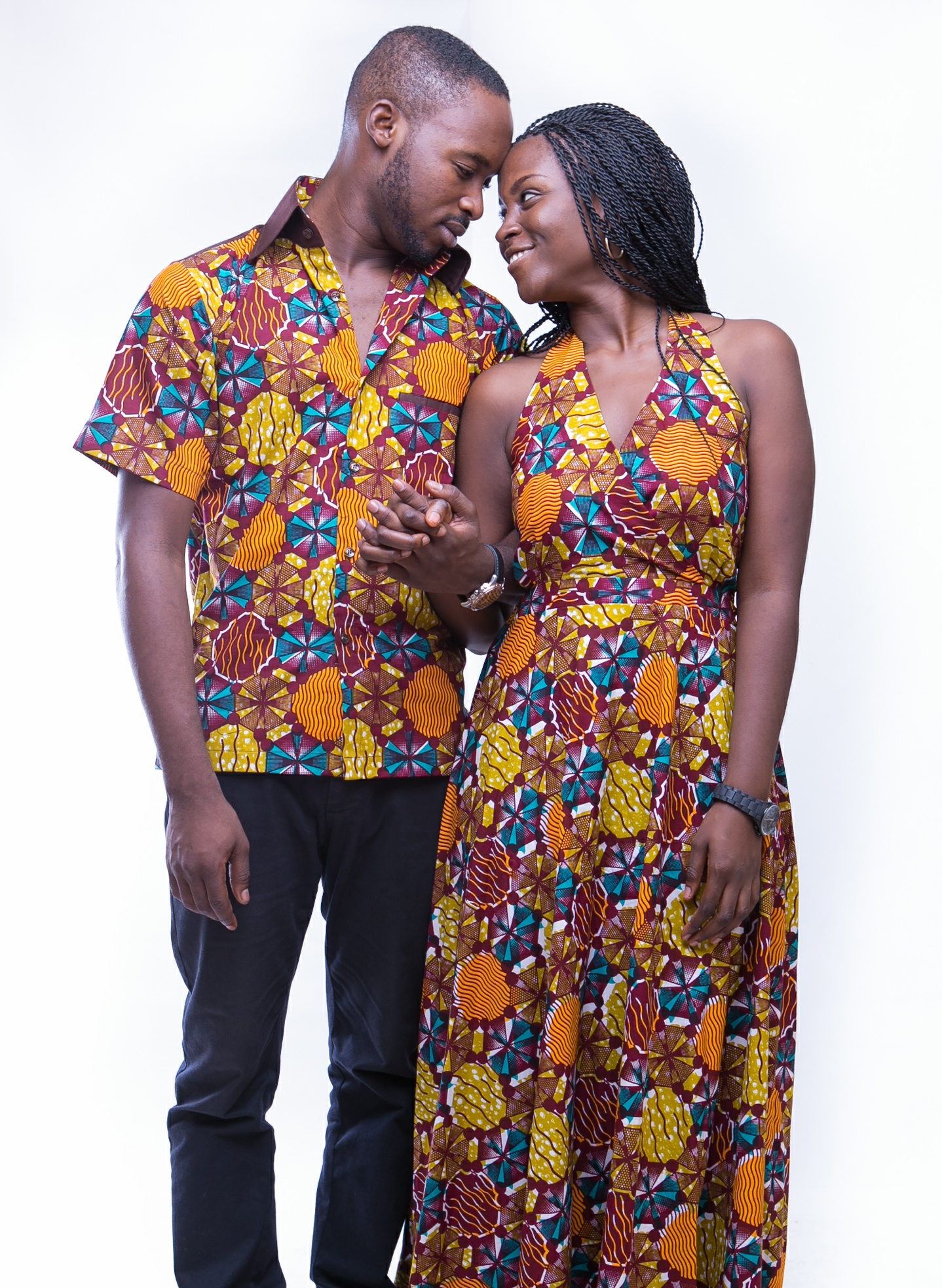
Couple showing signs of affection

The following stages are identified by the type of communication behavior that occurs in a given stage as well as the proportion of that type of communication behavior to another. In this case, proportion may constitute the frequency with which the acts occur or to the relative weight given to certain acts by those involved.

== Phase of coming together ==
=== Initiation ===
Initiation is the first stage where individuals make their first impressions on each other. While a lot of important impressions are being processed, the actual initiation stage likely lasts less than 15 seconds. In this stage, individuals are trying to display their best selves. Also, we are observing the other person to learn about them and, therefore, reduce our own uncertainty. Physical appearance often plays a big role in this stage when it comes to forming first impressions.

The methods and messages used to initiate communication vary based on:

- The kind of relationship and whether or not the individuals have been through this stage before
- The time allowed for the interaction
- The amount of time since the last greeting
- Situational or normative constraints
- Special codes of particular group

=== Experimentation ===
Experimentation is the stage where individuals begin to engage in self-disclosure to learn information about each other. The individuals use this stage to explore and get a feel for the relationship as well as one another. Small talk is a common form of communication in this stage, as both parties use it to search for an area of common interest or experience. At this stage, relationships are generally pleasant, casual, and uncritical. Knapp has long emphasized that most relationships will not progress past this stage.

=== Intensifying ===
During the intensifying stage of Knapp's model, the two individuals will continue experimentation to determine whether there is mutual emotional affection and attachment. Whereas in the previous experimentation phase, conversation focused more on superficial topics such as discovering shared areas of interest and commonalities, in the intensifying stage the level of self-disclosure deepens. The breadth of topics discussed broadens and the depth in which each individual feels comfortable discussing those topics with the other becomes intimate and personal.

In this stage, certain behaviors, such as increasing one-on-one contact through more frequent communication (through face to face encounters, text, or phone calls), doing favors for a partner or offering gifts as tokens of affection, requesting commitment from a partner through direct definitional bid, personalized verbal expressions of affection such as "I love you" or assigning pet names such as "babe," and suggestive actions such as flirtation, gazing, or touching, may all emerge as methods of intensifying the connection between the two people.

Essential to the intensifying stage are "secret tests" performed by each individual to ascertain whether his or her overtures are actually helpful in their intensification efforts. These tests most often manifest themselves through:

- Endurance, in which a partner is placed in an unpleasant, inconvenient, or uncomfortable situation or respond to certain requests to determine his or her commitment to the relationship.
- Public presentation, during which a partner is introduced under a particular label such as "boyfriend" or "girlfriend" to see if they are comfortable with being identified in this manner.
- Separation, which tests whether communication and feelings of affection will continue despite an inability to physically be together.
- Third-party questioning, where one partner may attempt to find out the hidden feelings of the interested party indirectly by asking a friend to probe the person of interest for indication as to their depth of feeling and affection.
- Triangle tests, in which one partner sees if they can elicit jealousy from the other partner when another person expresses interest in the person concocting the test.

While all five of these methods are common methods of testing intensification efforts, it's important to note that endurance, separation, and triangle tests are generally the least constructive, and can even be destructive when it comes to building the relationship.

== Phase of coming together and Relational Maintenance ==
=== Integration ===
Once each individual feels confident, through their various intensification efforts, that mutual affection has been confirmed, the couple may begin to transition into the integration stage of their relationship. In addition to bonding, the integration stage makes up the maintenance stage of a relationship. During this stage, the couple is fused and elements of their respective social identities, such as friends, belongings, and living spaces, are now shared. Other verbal and nonverbal manifestations of the integration include the couple seeing their relationship as special or unique in some way, the exchange of "trophies" for the other to wear or display, and potentially similarities in manner, dress, and verbal behavior can be seen. Today, another indicator of integration can be seen on social media sites where partners can be seen in each other's profile picture. Additionally, the exclusive commitment each partner has for the other is generally solidified in this stage through even deeper self-disclosure and revealing of secrets, sex, and discussion of future plans.

=== Bonding ===
The final stage of the coming together half of the relational model is bonding. This stage puts the relationship on public display and suggests that the relationship is exclusive. This stage often involves marriage or another type of public contract, though marriage is not necessary to successfully bond. There is usually a turning point that happens in this stage that signals a change in the relationship, making the relationship intimate. Reaching this stage does not guarantee that the relationship will remain bonded, though many intimate relationships will remain in this stage until divorce, death, or another type of separation.

== Phase of coming apart and Relational Maintenance ==
Along with the coming together stages, all relationships will go through the coming apart stages of the relational development model, though some may skip steps (e.g. a sudden death terminating the relationship).

=== Differentiating ===
Differentiating is a process of disengaging or uncoupling. During this stage, differences between the relationship partners are emphasized and what was thought to be similarities begins to disintegrate. Instead of working together, partners quickly begin to become more individualistic in their attitudes. Conflict is a common form of communication during this stage; oftentimes, it acts as a way to test how much the other can tolerate something that may threaten the relationship. Knapp believes that differentiating can be the result of bonding too quickly; meaning, sufficient breadth and depth (see: Social penetration theory) was not established during the previous stages. However, differentiating is expected to happen in romantic relationships. A common solution to differentiating is for each partner to give the other some space, though extreme differentiating can lead to a damaged relationship.

=== Circumscribing ===
Circumscribing sees a qualitative and quantitative decrease in information exchange. Communication is limited to safe topics. This stage is marked by less total communication in terms of number of interactions, depth and breadth of topics discussed, and communication occurs in shorter durations. Expressions of love and commitment also decrease.

== Phase of coming apart ==
=== Stagnation ===
In the stagnation stage, what were once patterns in the relationship become ruts and people feel stuck or trapped in the relationship. Communication in this stage sees partners saying very little because they "know" how the other person will respond. Individuals will engage in imagined interactions to predict a conversation with their partner. These imaginary dialogues can be either narratives ("I'll say this, and then she'll say this...") or perceived actual dialogues ("I'll do it." "You don't have to.").

At this stage, there is still some hope that the relationship can be revived. However, in many cases there are too many costs accumulating and, therefore, most do not stay at this stage for long. A key reason why individuals stay in this stage is to avoid the pain associated with terminating the relationship.

=== Avoidance ===
While the stagnation stage sees partners continue to inhabit the same environment, the avoidance stage sees partners exist in separate physical environments. When actual avoidance cannot take place, however, partners will simply avoid each other while they're together, treating the other as if they didn't exist. Essentially, the individuals in the relationship become separate from one another physically, emotionally, and mentally. When there is communication, it is often marked by antagonism or unfriendliness ("I just don't want to see or talk to you"). In addition to not spending time with one another, they both begin to avoid the other person's needs and start to focus solely on themselves.

Different forms of distancing are also common at this stage:

- Avoidance: preventing or reducing interaction during an encounter
- Disengagement: hiding information and interacting in a less personal manner
- Cognitive dissociation: disregarding messages and showing cognitive or emotional detachment

=== Termination ===
During the termination stage, both people that were in the relationship decide to end their connection with one another. No longer are they both receiving a mutually satisfying outcome from being with one another. Neither one of them is happy and the relationship must come to an end. In this model, this step is unavoidable and relationships can terminate at any time. Termination can occur due to physical separation, growing socially or psychologically apart, or the death of one of the partners. Communication in this stage is marked by distance (an attempt to put psychological and physical barriers between partners) and dissociation (messages that prepare one or both parties for their life without the other).

== Summary of movement through the stages ==
According to Knapp, movement through the stages has the following characteristics:

1. Movement is generally systematic and sequential. This does not suggest that the process is linear or unchangeable; the phenomenon is never at rest and is continually in flux. People do generally follow the same pattern, however. Each stage contains important presuppositions for the next. Sequencing makes forecasting adjacent stages easier. Skipping steps is risky due to potentially losing information that would have been provided in the skipped step.
2. Movement may be forward. Any movement toward greater levels of intimacy is considered "forward." When in the coming apart stages, any movement back toward a coming together stage would be a forward movement.
3. Movement may be backward. "Backward" movement constitutes any movement away from the bonding stage. Backward movement can be the result of moving too quickly, thus preventing any sort of stabilization.
4. Movement occurs within stages.
5. Movement is always to a new state. Partners can go through the same stages more than once, but they can never truly go back to "the way things were." However, their previous experience in a given stage will color their next trip through said stage.

In an effort to determine which stage partners are in, Welch and Rubin (2002) gave partners a list of behaviors and asked them to indicate the extent to which each behavior was characteristic of their relationship. Welch and Rubin also found that the relational development model was useful for describing the development of task or business relationships.

=== Rate of movement ===
According to Knapp, rate of movement is:

1. Usually rapid through stages that have already been achieved (e.g. there's no need for small talk if you've already passed through the experimenting stage before)
2. Usually rapid through areas where positive rewards have been achieved (e.g. avoiding conflict until later on in the relationship as it may be too costly early on)
3. Potentially rapid when time is short (e.g. a summer fling)
4. Potentially facilitated when proximity is high
5. Generally faster during the early stages
6. Based on individual needs (e.g. lonely or isolated people may move faster than popular people with large friend groups)
7. Slower if only one person wants to move to a different stage
8. Rapid in deterioration if one party commits a violation
