= Social penetration theory =

Interpersonal communication theory

The social penetration theory (SPT) proposes that interpersonal communication moves from relatively shallow, non-intimate levels to deeper, more intimate ones as relationships develop. Social penetration theory uses the onion metaphor to show how we reveal deeper parts of ourselves as a relationship grows. Intimacy mostly depends on what we choose to share and how we think our partner responds. Recent studies show these patterns also happen online, where people are selective about what they post on social media. The theory was formulated by psychologists Irwin Altman of the University of Utah and Dalmas Taylor of the University of Delaware in 1973 to understand the development of relationships between individuals. Altman and Taylor noted that relationships "involve different levels of intimacy of exchange or degree of social penetration". Thinking about how relationships typically become closer, modern researchers are using SPT to understand how people connect and build relationships online, like on social media. This idea helps researchers consider the ethical questions and problems that come up when people share personal details and try to keep things private when they interact online. SPT posits that relationship development progresses through stages characterized by increasing breadth and depth of self-disclosure, a process by factors such as uncertainty reduction, disclosure reciprocity, and the assessment of rewards and cost, while also considering potential barriers and the concept of de-penetration.

SPT is known as an objective theory as opposed to an interpretive theory, meaning it is based on data drawn from actual experiments and not simply from conclusions based on individuals' specific experiences.

SPT states that the relationship development occurs primarily through self-disclosure—when one intentionally reveals information such as personal motives, desires, feelings, thoughts, and experiences to others. This theory assumes that as people becomes closer with others, positive reinforcement through positive interactions allow people to achieve deeper levels of intimacy. The theory is also guided by the assumptions that relationship development is systematic and predictable. SPT also examines the process of de-penetration, how some relationships regress over time, and eventually end.

== Assumptions ==
SPT is based on four basic assumptions:

- Relationship development moves from superficial layers to intimate ones. For instance, people tend to present their outer images only, talking about hobbies on a first date. As the relational development progresses, wider and more controversial topics such as political views are included in the dialogues.
- Interpersonal relationships develop in a generally systematic and predictable manner. This assumption indicates the predictability of relationship development. Although it is impossible to foresee the exact and precise path of relational development, there is a certain trajectory to follow. As Altman and Taylor note, "[p]eople seem to possess very sensitive tuning mechanisms which enable them to program carefully their interpersonal relationships."
- Relational development can move backward, resulting in de-penetration and dissolution. For example, after prolonged and fierce fights, a couple who originally planned to get married may decide to break up and ultimately become strangers.
- Self-disclosure is one key to facilitate relationship development and involves the disclosing and sharing personal information to others. It enables individuals to know each other and plays a crucial role in determining how far a relationship can go, as gradual exploration of mutual selves is essential in the process of social penetration.

== Self-disclosure ==
Self-disclosure is a purposeful disclosure of personal information to another person. Disclosure may include sharing both high-risk and low-risk information as well as personal experiences, ideas, attitudes, feelings, values, past facts and life stories, future hopes, dreams, ambitions, and goals. In sharing information about themselves, people make choices about what to share and with whom to share it. Altman and Taylor believe that opening the inner self to the other individual is the main path to reaching intimate relationships.

Interpersonal communication studies show that relationship development is progressive in nature, as couples slowly move from shallow interactions to more intimate forms of self-disclosure. The initial interactions involve more extensive information including personal beliefs and emotions along with rational issues. With increasing disclosure, there is a rise in awareness about the responsiveness and trust among partners, which helps develop stronger bonds between them. It is also seen the that greater disclosure results in greater liking and intimacy.

As for the speed of self-disclosure, Altman and Taylor were convinced that the process of social penetration moves quickly in the beginning stages of a relationship and slows down considerably in the later stages. Those who are able to develop a long-term, positive reward/cost outcome are the same people who are able to share important matches of breadth categories. The early reward/cost assessment has a strong impact on the relationship's reactions, involvement, and expectations in a relationship regarding the future, play a major role in the outcome of the relationship.

=== Uncertainty reduction theory ===
The uncertainty reduction theory (URT) is the process that people experience as they begin new relationships. When two strangers meet, they engage by asking each other questions in order to build a stronger relationship. In the context of both URT and SPT, questions are seen as a tool to learn information about the other in order to receive rewards. These rewards are either physical/material rewards, or abstract rewards that supplement the relationship as it develops.

Through this process of asking questions in a new relationship, uncertainty and anxiety can be reduced and lead to a more developed relationship between the two people. Where social penetration theory postulates that new relationships (either romantic or platonic) steadily evolve into deeper conversations and interactions, uncertainty reduction theory postulates that these new relationships can reach that deep level through question and answer processes. Although SPT primarily focuses on the linear trajectory of the relationship as the two parties get a deeper understanding of one another, URT is relevant in that it focuses on each instance when uncertainty may need to be reduced through question asking on a case-by-case basis (e.g. the two people initially meet and questions are asked; later on in the relationship, one party asks the other to meet their parents, and the two engage in URT to reduce the anxiety and uncertainty surrounding the situation).

=== Disclosure reciprocity ===
Self-disclosure is reciprocal, especially in the early stages of relationship development. Disclosure reciprocity is an indispensable component in SPT, and is a process where one person reveals personal information of a certain intimacy level, and the other person discloses information of the same level. It is two-way disclosure, or mutual disclosure. Disclosure reciprocity can induce positive and satisfactory feelings and drive forward relational development, because as mutual disclosure takes place between individuals, they might feel a sense of emotional equity. Disclosure reciprocity occurs when the openness of one person is reciprocated with the same degree of the openness from the other person. For instance, if someone was to bring up their experience with an intimate topic such as weight gain or having divorced parents, the person they are talking to could reciprocate by sharing their own experience.

Self-disclosure being reciprocated is also a forming foundation for interpersonal relationships. If self-disclosure is not reciprocated in an interpersonal relationship, it moves the relationship to potentially face a stage of de-penetration or "slow deterioration" (West, 2018). This can happen in a few ways, such as oversharing and undersharing. Oversharing personal information can lead to the end of the relationship, as "[s]ome partners may be ill-equipped and underprepared to know someone so intimately" (West, 2018). Since self-disclosure depends on going back and forth, if one partner does not share in that, it leads to an imbalance in the relationship, and the bond will unlikely progress since the other partner only knows a certain amount. This also causes the partner who shares or discloses not wanting to disclose any further, hindering the interpersonal relationship's progress because "[t]he greater the depth, the more opportunity for a person to feel vulnerable" (West, 2018). Vulnerability leads the partner to believe that there can be an interpersonal relationship as it translates into trust for partners' relationship.

=== Onion model ===
SPT uses the onion model, which visualizes self-disclosure as a process of removing layers. The onion denotes various layers of personality. It is sometimes called the "onion theory" of personality. Three major factors influence self-revelation and begin the process of the onion theory: personal characteristics, reward/cost assessments, and the situational context.

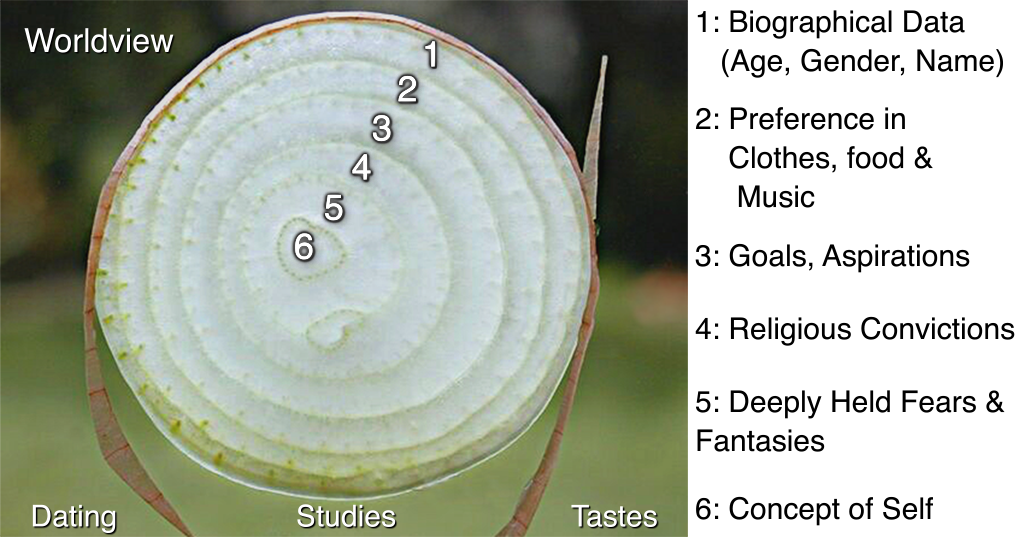
Onion Metaphor - Social Penetration Theory

=== Stages ===
Relationship development is not automatic, but occurs through the skills of partners in revealing or disclosing first their attitudes and later their personalities, inner character, and true selves. This is done in a reciprocal manner. The main factor that acts as a catalyst in the development of relationships is proper self disclosure. Altman and Taylor proposes that there are four major stages in social penetration:

1. The orientation stage: individuals engage in small talk and simple, harmless clichés like, 'Life's like that'. This first stage follows the standards of social desirability and norms of appropriateness. The outer images are presented and peripheral information are exchanged. The most, but least intimate information is given here.
2. The exploratory affective stage: individuals start to reveal the inner self bit by bit, expressing personal attitudes about moderate topics such as government and education. This may not be the whole truth as individuals are not yet comfortable to lay themselves bare. This is the stage of casual friendship, and many relationships do not go past this stage.
3. The affective stage: individuals are getting more comfortable to talk about private and personal matters, and there are some forms of commitment in this stage. Personal idioms, or words and phrases that embody unique meanings between individuals, are used in conversations. Criticism and arguments may arise. A comfortable share of positive and negative reactions occur in this stage. Relationships become more important, meaningful, and enduring to both parties. It is a stage of close friendships and intimate partners.
4. The stable stage: the relationship now reaches a plateau in which some of the deepest personal thoughts, beliefs, and values are shared and each can predict the emotional reactions of the other person. This stage is characterized with complete openness, raw honesty and a high degree of spontaneity. The least, but most intimate information is given here.
5. De-penetration stage (optional): when the relationship starts to break down and costs exceed benefits, there is a withdrawal of disclosure that causes the relationship to end.

=== De-penetration ===
De-penetration is a gradual process of layer-by-layer withdrawal that causes relationship and intimacy levels to regress and fade away. According to Altman and Taylor, when de-penetration occurs, "interpersonal exchange should proceed backwards from more to less intimate areas, should decrease in breadth or volume, and, as a result, the total cumulative wedge of exchange should shrink". A warm friendship between two people will deteriorate if they begin to close off areas of their lives that had earlier been opened. Relationships are likely to break down not in an explosive argument but in a gradual cooling off of enjoyment and care. Tolstedt and Stokes note that in the de-penetration process, self-disclosure breadth reduces and self-disclosure depth increases. This is because when an intimate relationship is dissolving, a wide range of judgments, feelings and evaluations, particularly the negative ones, are involved in conversations. A notable finding in modern research using SPT is that even when relationships become less close, positive outcomes can still emerge later. Brody et al. (2024) presented the idea that the quality and closeness of past relationships, even those that have faded, can influence people’s happiness and health if they reconnect with those individuals. Brody et al. (2024) research indicates that re-establishing contact with someone they were once very close to and shared a great deal of personal information with can improve their well-being. The findings suggests that even if a relationship becomes less intense, the prior closeness can still contribute to well-being upon reconnection. This illustrates that the core concepts of SPT, regarding self-disclosure and intimacy levels, are not only important for initiating and maintaining strong relationships. They also hold relevance when relationships evolve and when people might reconnect, potentially having a considerable effect on individuals overall well-being.

=== Idiomatic communication in self-disclosure ===
Within the coming together and falling apart stages of a relationship, partners oftentimes use unique forms of communication, such as nicknames and idioms, to refer to one another. This is known as idiomatic communication, a phenomenon that is reported to occur more often among couples in the coming together stages of a relationship. Couples falling apart reported that idiomatic communication, which can include teasing insults and other personally provocative language, have an adverse effect overall on the relationship.

=== Breadth and depth ===
Both depth and breadth are related to the onion model. As the wedge penetrates the layers of the onion, the degree of intimacy and the range of areas in an individual's life that an individual chooses to share increases.

The breadth of penetration is the range of areas in an individual's life being disclosed, or the range of topics discussed. For instance, one segment could be family, a specific romantic relationship, or academic studies. Each of these segments or areas are not always accessed at the same time. One could be completely open about a family relationship while hiding an aspect of a romantic relationship for various reasons such as abuse or disapproval from family or friends. It takes genuine intimacy with all segments to be able to access all areas of breadth at all times.

The depth of penetration is a degree of intimacy; as individuals overcome common anxiety over self-disclosure, intimacy builds. Deeper intimacy facilitates relational trust and encourages further conversation about deeper things than would be discussed in everyday conversation. This deepening occurs in many types of relationships: friendship, familial, peer, and romantic.

It is possible to have depth without breadth and vice versa. For instance, depth without breadth could be where only one area of intimacy is accessed. "A relationship that could be depicted from the onion model would be a summer romance. This would be depth without breadth." On the other hand, breadth without depth would be simple everyday conversations. An example would be when passing by an acquaintance and saying, "Hi, how are you?" without ever really expecting to stop and listen to what this person has to say.

The relationship between breadth and depth can be similar to that used in modern technology. Pennington describes in a study that

... With a click of the mouse to accept them as a "friend" roommates across the country can learn: relationships status (single, engaged, it's complicated), favorite movies, books, TV shows, religious views, political views, and a whole lot more if someone takes the time to fill out an entire Facebook profile.

Because of social media, the breadth of subjects can be wide, as well as the depth of those using the platforms. Users of these platforms seem to feel obligated to share simple information as was listed by Pennington, but also highly personal information that can now be considered general knowledge. Because of social media platforms and users' willingness to share personal information, the law of reciprocity is replaced by divulging personal information to countless followers and friends without them reciprocating the same level of vulnerability. In cases like this, there is depth without much breadth.

=== Barriers ===
Several factors can affect the amount of self-disclosure between partners: gender, race, religion, personality, social status, and ethnic background. For example, American friends tend to discuss intimate topics with each other, whereas Japanese friends are more likely to discuss superficial topics. One might feel less inclined to disclose personal information if doing so would violate their religious beliefs. Being part of a religious minority can also influence how much one feels comfortable in disclosing personal information. In romantic relationships, women are more likely to self-disclose than their male counterparts. Men often refrain from expressing deep emotions out of fear of social stigma. Such barriers can slow the rate of self-disclosure and even prevent relationships from forming. In theory, the more dissimilar two people are, the more difficult or unlikely self-disclosure becomes.

=== Stranger-on-the-train phenomenon ===
Most of the time individuals engage in self-disclosure strategically, carefully evaluating what to disclose and what to be reserved, since disclosing too much in the early stage of relationship is generally considered inappropriate, and can end or damage a relationship. In certain contexts, self-disclosure does not follow the pattern. This exception is known as the "stranger-on-the-train" phenomenon, in which individuals rapidly reveal personal information with complete strangers in public spaces. This specific concept can be known as verbal leakage, which is defined by Floyd as "unintentionally telling another person something about yourself". SPT operates under the impression that the self-disclosure given is not only truthful, meaning the speaker believes what is being said to be true, but intentional. Self-disclosure can be defined as "the voluntary sharing of personal history, preferences, attitudes, feelings, values, secrets, etc., with another person". The information given in any relationship, whether acquaintance or a well-established relationship, should be voluntarily shared, otherwise it does not follow the laws of reciprocity and is considered verbal leakage, or the stranger-on-the-train phenomenon. Some researchers argue that revealing our inner self to complete strangers is deemed as "cathartic exercise" or "service of confession", which allows individuals to unload emotions and express deeper thoughts without being haunted by potential unfavorable comments or judgements. This is because people tend to take lightly and dismiss responses from strangers, who do not really matter in their lives. Some researchers suggest that this phenomenon occurs because individuals feel less vulnerable to open up to strangers who they do not expect to see again.

=== Sexual communication anxiety among couples ===
The rate of sexual satisfaction in relationships has been observed to relate directly to effective communication between couples. Individuals in a relationship who experience anxiety find it difficult to divulge information regarding their sexuality and desires due to the perceived vulnerabilities in doing so. In a study published by the Archives of Sexual Behavior, socially anxious individuals generally attribute potential judgement or scrutiny as the main instigators for any insecurities in self-disclosing to their romantic partners. This fear of intimacy, and thus a lower level of sexual self-disclosure within a relationship, is predicted to correlate to a decrease in sexual satisfaction.

== Rewards and costs assessment ==
=== Social exchange theory ===
Social exchange theory states that humans weigh each relationship and interaction with another human on a reward–cost scale without realizing it. If the interaction was satisfactory, then that person or relationship is looked upon favorably. When there are positive interactions that produce good reward/cost calculations, the relationship is likely to be more satisfying. If an interaction was unsatisfactory, then the relationship will be evaluated for its costs compared to its rewards or benefits. People try to predict the outcome of an interaction before it takes place. From a scientific standpoint, Altman and Taylor were able to assign letters as mathematical representations of costs and rewards. They also borrowed the concepts from Thibaut and Kelley's in order to describe the relation of costs and rewards of relationships. Thibaut and Kelley's key concepts of relational outcome, relational satisfaction, and relational stability serve as the foundation of Irwin and Taylor's rewards minus costs, comparison level, and comparison level of alternatives.

== Applications ==
=== Interpersonal communication ===
The value of SPT initially lies in the area of interpersonal communication. Scholars have been using the concepts and onion model to explore the development of counter-sex/romantic relationships, friendships, parent-child relationships, employer-employee relationships, caregiver-patient relationships and beyond. Some of the key findings are described as follows.

Researchers have found that in parent-child relationships, information derived from the child's spontaneous disclosure in daily activities was most closely connected to generating and maintaining their trust in parents, indicating the importance of developing shallow but broad relationships with children through everyday conversation rather than long-lasting profound lectures (Kerr, Stattin & Trost, 1999). Honeycutt used the SPT model and the Attraction Paradigm to analyze happiness between married couples. While the SPT model believes that relationships are grounded on effective communication, the Attraction Paradigm believes that relationships are grounded on having shared interests, personality types, and beliefs. The results showed that having a perceived understanding of each other can lead to happiness between married couples. While research notes that it looks only at perceived understanding and not actual understanding, it shows the importance of relationship development. The more that partners in a relationship interact with each other, the more likely they are to understand each other better. Scholars also use this theory to examine other factors influencing the social penetration process in close friendships. As Mitchell and William (1987) state, ethnicity and sex have an impact on friendships. The survey results indicates that more breadth of topics occurs in penetration process in black friendships than white. Regarding caregiver–patient relationships, developing a social penetrated relationship with institution disclosed breadth and depth information and multiple effective penetration strategies is critical to the benefits of the patients (Yin & Lau, 2005).

==== Gender-based difference in self-disclosure ====
Research demonstrates that there are significant gender differences in self-disclosure, particularly emotional self-disclosure, or expressing personal feelings and emotions, such as, "Sometimes, I feel lonely to study abroad and to be away from my family." Emotional self-disclosure is at the core of intimate relationship development, because unlike factual (descriptive) self-disclosure or superficial self-relevant facts, it is more personal and more effective to cultivate intimacy. Emotional self-disclosure makes individuals "transparent" and vulnerable to others. According to previous studies, females are more socially oriented, whereas males are more task-oriented, and thus females are believed to be more socially interdependent than males. In a friendship between females, emotional attachments such as sharing emotions, thoughts, experiences, and supports are fundamental, while friendships between males tend to focus on activities and companionship. Overall, women's friendships are described as more intimate than men's friendships.

In addition, there is a gender difference regarding to topics revealed. Men tend to disclose their strengths, while women disclose their fears more. Both men and women are prone to disclose their emotions to same-sex friends more, but women are prone to reveal more than men to both same-sex as well as cross-sex friends. According to research conducted among Pakistani students, women extensively disclose their feelings, while emotions such as depression, anxiety and fear are more likely being disclosed to male friends, because men are perceived as more capable to deal with such emotions.

==== Self-disclosure in intercultural relationships ====
Research reveals that there are multiple obstacles and tensions that occur within intercultural and interracial relationships that do not exist in intracultural and intraracial relationships. These challenges are due to the different norms and ideals a person learns within their racial, ethnic, and national group contexts, meaning an individual will feel more comfortable and understood by those who learned and share the same coordinated meanings.

The first obstacle that may occur is in the initial meeting, since cultural and racial differences can hinder a relationship from forming. If a connection develops, the next obstacle is in self-disclosure. Through self-disclosure, the relationship evolves from the superficial orientation stage to a more intimate, understanding level.

==== Self-disclosure in the LGBT community ====
Minority groups have a unique way of creating closeness between each other. For example, lesbian friendships and intimate relationships are reliant on mutual self-disclosure and honesty. Both parties must expose themselves for an authentic and genuine relationship to develop. The problem is that for many lesbians, this process is not always as simple as it may seem. Exposing one's sexual orientation can be a difficult and grueling process and because of this, many lesbians avoid disclosing their true identities to new acquaintances, which leads them to turn to their family members or already existing social support systems, and can strain or reduce those relationships. Because of these difficulties, lesbians will limit who they choose to surround themselves with. Many involve themselves in groups that solely consist of lesbians or solely consist of heterosexual women to avoid their true lesbian identity. It can be difficult for lesbian individuals to open-up about their sexual identities, because of the fear of being rejected or losing special relationships.

A study was done to examine self-disclosure among LGBT youths. Through a series of interviews, one group described their coming out experiences. They told the interviewers about who they chose to disclose their sexual orientation to and whether the disclosure had a positive or negative effect on their relationships. Results showed that more youths disclosed their sexual orientation to their friends than to their parents. A number of participants chose to disclose their sexual orientation to their teachers. Results also showed both positive and negative reactions. Some youth expressed de-penetration in their friendships after coming out, as well as de-penetration in their sibling relationships. Some participants expressed experiencing other reactions beside positive and negative. There were invalidated reactions, where a participant's sexual orientation was dismissed as a “phase”, and neutral reactions, where the recipient of the disclosure informed the participant that they were already aware of their sexual orientation. Some participants expressed having mixed and evolving results. For example, a participant who identified as a transgender man said that his mother was initially fine with his sexual orientation, which at the time was a lesbian, but had a negative reaction when he later came out as transgender. A few participants mentioned that they had initially received negative reactions from friends and family after coming out, but that as time went on, their sexual orientation came to be accepted and the relationships remained intact.

LGBT professionals often feel anxiety about disclosing their sexual orientation to their colleagues. Professionals who chose to disclose their sexual orientation have had mixed reactions in how it has affected their relationship with their colleagues. Some had had positive reactions, strengthening their relationships and their overall job satisfaction, while others have had the opposite experience. They feel that disclosing their sexual orientation hurt their professional relationships and their overall job satisfaction. The atmosphere of one's office can influence their decision to disclose their sexual orientation. If their colleagues are themselves LGBT or if they have voiced support for the LGBT community, the more likely they are to disclose their sexual orientation. If they have little to no colleagues who are openly part of the LGBT community or if there is no vocal support, the less likely they are to come out.

According to a study, LGBT people have different ways of coming out. These varying methods of disclosure include pre-planned, in which someone decides to arrange a conversation; emergent, in which someone decides to come out based on an ongoing conversation; coaxed, in which someone encouraged to come out by someone else; forced, in which someone is coerced to come out; romantic, in which someone comes out by making romantic or sexual advances; or educational, in which someone comes out in order to educate or encourage others, usually in front of an audience.

==== Patient self-disclosure in psychotherapy ====
Patient self-disclosure has been a prominent issue in therapy, particularly in psychotherapy. Early studies have shown that patients' self-disclosure is positively related to treatment outcomes. Freud is a pioneer in encouraging his patients to totally open up in psychotherapy. Many early clinical innovations, such as lying on the couch and therapist's silence, are aimed to create an environment, an atmosphere, that allows patients to disclose their deepest self, and free them from concerns facilitating conscious suppression of emotions or memories. Even with such efforts, Barry A. Farber says that in psychotherapy, "full disclosure is more of an ideal than an actuality". Patients are prone to reveal certain topics to the therapists, such as disliked characteristics of themselves, social activities, as well as relationships with friends and significant ones; and tend to avoid discussing certain issues, such as sexual-oriented experiences, immediately experienced negative reactions (e.g. feeling misunderstood or confused) due to conscious inhibition.

In psychotherapy, patients have to deal with the tension between confessional relief and confessional shame all the time. It has been shown that the length of therapy and the strength of the therapeutic alliance (the bond between the patient and the therapist) are two major factors that affect self-disclosure in psychotherapy. As SPT indicates, the longer patients spent time with their therapists, the range of issues being discussed broadens, and more topics are marked with depth. The greater the depth of the discussions, the more likely the patient feels being vulnerable. To strengthen the alliance, cultivating a comfortable atmosphere for self-disclosure and self-discovery is important.

==== Ethical decision making ====
Ethical and moral decision making has been the topic of contentious academic debate for some time. According to a study, SPT was found to be one of the most applicable communication theories to explain the way people make their decisions based on their ethical and moral compass. The theory shows strong correlation between self-disclosure and reinforcement patterns, which are shown to have a big impact on one's perceived ethical code. This can be applied to a number of fields including communications, psychology, ethics, philosophy, and sociology. Modern researchers are paying more attention to how people’s relationships and the personal details individuals share influence the choices made when dealing with difficult ethical situations. Baack et al. (2000) demonstrated that the closeness individuals feel with someone, built through sharing personal information, can significantly alter how individuals are emotionally affected when facing tough ethical decisions. Furthermore, whether individuals choose to discuss an ethical problem they are encountering or a decision they have made can either strengthen understanding within their relationships or create conflict and distance.

==== Patient/therapist self-disclosure ====
The condition of patients with eating disorders have been shown to improve with therapist self-disclosure. In 2017, a study was conducted surveying 120 participants (95% of which were women). For the purpose of the study, appropriate therapist self-disclosure was defined as sharing positive feelings towards participants in therapy and discussing one's training background.

The results found that 84% of people said their therapist disclosed positive feelings to them while in therapy. The study found that when therapists disclosed positive feelings, it had a positive effect on the patient's eating problems. Eating disorders generally got better with therapist self-disclosure. When the therapist shared self-referent information to the patient it created trust and the patients perceived the therapist as being more "human." Patients with eating disorders saw the therapist disclosure as a strengthening therapeutic relationship. However, personal self-disclosure of the therapist ‒ sexuality, personal values, and negative feelings ‒ was considered inappropriate by patients.

==== Self-disclosure and individuals with social anxiety disorder ====
Social anxiety disorder (SAD) is a disorder in which individuals experience overwhelming levels of fear in social situations and interactions. They tend to adopt strategic avoidance of social interactions, which makes it challenging for them to disclose themselves to others and reveal emotions. Self-disclosure is the key to foster intimate relationships, in which individuals can receive needed social support. Close friendships and romantic relationships are two major sources for social supports, which have protective effects and play a crucial role in helping individuals with social phobia to cope with distress. Due to the profound impacts of the anxiety disorder, it has been found that late marriage or staying unmarried is prevalent among individuals with SAD. This is problematic, because being unable to gain needed social supports from intimate ones further confines the social phobic in the loneliness and depression that they have been suffering from. In response to the problem, Sparrevohn and Rapee suggest that improving communication skills, particularly self-disclosure and emotional expression, should be included in future social phobia treatment, so the quality of life of individuals with social phobia can be improved.

==== Server-patron mutual disclosure in restaurant industry ====
As social penetration theory suggests, disclosure reciprocity induces positive emotion which is essential for retaining close and enduring relationships. In the service industry, compared with securing new customers, maintaining long-term relationships with existing customers is more cost-effective. Hwang et al. indicates that mutual disclosure is the vital factor for establishing trust between customers and servers. Effective server disclosure, such as sincere advice about menu choices and personal favorite dishes, can elicit reciprocity of information exchange between servers and customers. The received information regarding to the taste and preference of the customers then can be used to provide tailored services, which in turn can positively strengthen customers' trust, commitment and loyalty toward the restaurant.

Hwang et al. suggest that server disclosure is more effective to evoke customer disclosure in female customers, who are more likely to reveal personal information than their male counterparts. In addition, studies have shown that factors such as expertise (e.g. servers' knowledge and experience), customer-oriented attribute (e.g. listening to the concerns from the customers attentively), as well as marital status influence mutual disclosure in the restaurant setting. Expertise is positively correlated to both customer and server disclosure. Server disclosure is only effective in inducing disclosure and positive feelings from unmarried patrons who feel more comfortable to have a conversation with the servers.

=== Organizational communication ===
The ideas posited by the theory have been researched and re-examined by scholars when looking at organizational communication. Some scholars explored the arena of company policy making, demonstrating that the effect company policies have on the employees, ranging from slight attitudinal responses (such as dissatisfaction) to radical behavioral reactions (such as conflicts, fights and resignation). In this way, sophisticated implementation of controversial policies is required (Baack, 1991). SPT offers a framework allowing for an explanation of the potential issues.

=== Media-mediated communication ===
==== Self-disclosure in reality TV ====
Reality television is a genre characterized by real-life situations and very intimate self-disclosure. Self-disclosure on reality shows can be considered to be self-disclosure by media characters, and the relationship between the audience and the media character is parasocial.

In reality shows, self-disclosure is usually delivered as monologue, which is similar real-life self-disclosure and gives the audience the illusion that the messages are directed to them. According to social penetration theory, self-disclosure should follow certain stages, moving from the superficial layers to the central layers gradually. Nonetheless, rapid self-disclosure of intimate layers is a norm in reality TV shows, and unlike interpersonal interactions, viewers prefer early intimate disclosure and such disclosure leads to positive rather than uncomfortable feelings.

=== Computer-mediated communication ===
Computer-mediated communication (CMC) is another way in which people can develop relationships. Technology is seen as a medium that connects people, who would otherwise be strangers, through shared interests or cultures. The Internet has been thought to broaden the way people communicate and help build relationships by providing a medium in which people can be open-minded and unconventional, and circumvent traditional limitations like time and place. (Yum & Hara, 2005) Before social media and online dating sites, strangers communicated with each other through pen-pal organizations or face-to-face in public locations. With the influx of CMC and the advancement of technology, strangers can decide whether they will invest time in and develop a relationship based on information that is provided in a profile. When someone sees that a person included a similar interest to them in their profile, the uncertainty becomes reduced and the two strangers utilize CMC to connect over their shared interests.

As time has progressed, the stigma around online dating has reduced significantly and more research on SPT and CMC is being done. When engaging in a new relationship through CMC, there are some missing elements and nonverbal cues, which increases the uncertainty in the relationship. With the prominent use of online dating services, relationship development has changed. Before CMC influenced relationships, couples solely relied on face-to-face interactions, nonverbal cues, and first impressions to decide if they would continue to develop the relationship further. The introduction of CMC in romantic relationships has added an element for all parties to consider when beginning their relationships. Researchers have increasingly used the ideas of SPT to understand how relationships function online. A study by Huang (2016) looked at the positive outcomes when people share different aspects of themselves on social media. The study found that when individuals share positive information about their lives, it often makes them feel closer to their online friends. This aligns with the central idea of SPT, which suggests that self-disclosure helps build closeness. Online, this can occur as people gradually share what they are comfortable with, slowly discussing a wider range of topics (breadth) and revealing more personal details over time (depth). Huang’s (2016) work indicates that even without face-to-face interactions, the fundamental principle of sharing oneself to connect with others remains relevant online.

Some researchers found that self-disclosure online tends to reassure people that if they are rejected, it is more likely to be by strangers and not family or friends, which reinforces the desire to self-disclose online rather than face-to-face. Not only are people meeting new people to make friends, but many people are meeting and initiating romantic relationships online. (Yum & Hara, 2005) In another study, it was found that "CMC dyads compensated for the limitations of the channel by making their questions more intimate than those who exhibited face-to-face" (Sheldon, 2009). Expanding on these concepts, Pennington (2021) examines how people connect on platforms like Facebook. She studied how the affordances of Facebook influence how much individuals share and how people’s online relationships develop. Pennington observed how choosing to share publicly versus privately affects how deeply people open up, with more personal information typically remaining in private messages. Additionally, how individuals configure their Facebook profiles who they designate as friends can affect the initial stages of an online relationship, similar to the orientation stage phase in person. Pennington’s work considers how people interact later one, from public comments to private chats, and how that demonstrates their progression through the stages of relational development by becoming closer online.

Another study by Pennington (2020) applied SPT to understand how relationships are maintained or dissolve on social media. This research found that consistent online sharing helps keep people connected, but reduced sharing or unfriending someone can mirror the gradual decline of relationships described by SPT. Overall, these studies indicate that the principles of SPT are useful for understanding how relationships begin, are sustained, and even end within the realm of online communication.

==== Celebrities' self-disclosure on social media ====
On social media, the boundaries between interpersonal and mass communication is blurred, and parasocial interaction (PSI) is adopted strategically by celebrities to enhance liking, intimacy, and credibility from their followers. As Ledbetter and Redd notes, "During PSI, people interact with a media figure, to some extent, as if they were in an actual interpersonal relationships with the target entity." For celebrities, professional self-disclosure (e.g. information about upcoming events) and personal self-disclosure such as emotions and feelings are two primary ways to cultivate illusory intimacy with their followers and to expand their fan bases. Unlike real-life interpersonal relationships, disclosure reciprocity is not expected in parasocial interactions, although through imagined interactions on social medias, followers feel they are connected to the media figures.

==== Social networking ====
Self-disclosure has been studied when it comes to face-to-face interactions. There have been surveys conducted about how social networking sites such as Facebook, MySpace, Twitter, LinkedIn, hi5, myyearbook, or Friendster affect interactions between human beings. On Facebook, users are able to determine their level and degree of self-disclosure by setting their privacy settings. Individuals achieve breadth by posting about various aspects of their lives and sharing surface-level information. Individuals become closer and more intimate by sending private messages and creating small private groups, where people often share more personal and sensitive information. Sharing more personal information in private conversations in real life fosters closeness, and similarly, doing the same through private messages and closed groups on Facebook helps people build a deeper connection online. This aligns with what researcher Pennington found in 2021, which is how Facebook’s affordances allows people to share at different levels. Public posts are like sharing on the surface, while private messages are more like having a deeper more intimate conversations.

The level of intimacy that one chooses to disclose depends on the type of website they are using to communicate. Disclosing personal information online is a goal-oriented process; if one's goal is to build a relationship with someone, they would likely disclose personal information over instant messaging (IM) and on social media. It is highly unlikely that they would choose to share that information in a website that is used for online shopping. With online shopping, the goal is to make a purchase, so the individual would share only the information needed (i.e. name and address) to make a purchase. When disclosing information over IM and in social media, the individual is much more selective in what they choose to disclose. Huang (2016) study illustrates a key aspect of SPT because its finding that sharing personal information, whether positive or negative, often leads to increased feelings of closeness with online friends directly supports SPT’s central argument that relational intimacy develops through the process of self-disclosure.

"The hyperpersonal perspective suggests that the limited cues in CMC are likely to result in over attribution and exaggerated or idealized perceptions of others and that those who meet and interact via CMC use such limited cues to engage in optimized or selective self-presentation". (Walther, 1996) There is the possibility that someone could mislead another person because there are more opportunities to build a more desirable identity without fear of persecution. If there is no chance of ever meeting the person on the other end of the computer, then there is a high risk of falsifying information and credentials.

Research has been done to see what kinds of people tend to benefit most from online self-disclosure. The "social compensation" or "poor-get-richer" hypothesis (Sheldon, 2009) suggests that those who have poor social networks and social anxiety can benefit by disclosing themselves freely and creating new relationships through the Internet (Sheldon, 2009). However, other research has been performed to observe that extraverts are more likely to disclose information online. This brings in the "rich-get-richer" hypothesis (Sheldon, 2009), which states that "the Internet primarily benefits extraverted individuals... [and] online communication... increases the opportunities for extraverted adolescents to make friends... [the research concluded that] extraverted individuals disclosed more online than introverted" (Sheldon, 2009). Although initial online sharing might occur quickly, as suggested by Huang (2016), a study by Sheldon in 2009 indicated that developing deep closeness with people online can be more challenging compared to in-person interactions. This is because while individuals might rapidly discuss various topics online, achieving the genuine intimacy and deep connection that SPT describes as developing in the later stages of relationships can be more difficult through computer or phone communication alone. The deeper levels of sharing personal information and the development of strong emotional bonds, which SPT emphasizes, may be hindered by the limitations of online communication compared to face-to-face interactions.

==== Online dating ====
Some scholars posit that when initiating a romantic relationship, there are important differences between internet dating sites and other spaces, such as the depth and breadth of the self-disclosed information given before they go further to one-on-one conversation. Studies have shown that in real life, adolescents tend to engage in sexual disclosure according to the level of relationship intimacy, which supports the social penetration model; in cyberspace, men present a stronger willingness and interest to communicate without regarding the current intimacy status or degree. There are also many counter-examples of the theory that exist in romantic relationship development. Some adolescents discuss the most intimate information when they first meet online or have sex without knowing each other thoroughly. Contrary to the path stated by SPT, the relationship would have developed from the core – the highest depth – to the superficial surface of large breadth. In this way, sexual disclosure on the part of adolescents under certain circumstances departs from the perspective of SPT.

Gibbs, Ellison, and Heino conducted a study analyzing self-disclosure in online dating. They found that the desire for an intimate face-to-face relationship could be a decision factor into how much information one chose to disclose in online dating. This might mean presenting an honest depiction of one's self online as opposed to a positive one. Having an honest depiction can potentially prevent dating from occurring, especially if the depiction is seen as negative. This could be beneficial, as it would prevent the formation of a relationship that would likely fail. It could also cause the potential date to self-disclose about themselves in response, adding to the possibility of making a connection.

Some individuals might focus more on having a positive depiction, which may cause them to be more selective in the information they disclose. An individual who presents themselves honestly could argue that disclosing their negative information is necessary as in a long-term relationship, one's partner would eventually learn of their flaws. An individual who presents themselves positively could argue it is more appropriate to wait until the relationship develops before sharing negative information.

In a separate study, Ellison, Heino, and Gibbs analyzed specifically how one chose to present themselves in online dating. They found that most individuals thought of themselves as being honest in how they presented themselves, and that they could not understand why someone would present themselves dishonestly. Most people present an ideal self – what one would like themselves to be as opposed to what they actually are in reality. One could justify this by believing that they could become their ideal self in the future. Some users might present themselves in a way that is not necessarily false, but not fully true either. For example, one could say that they enjoy activities such as scuba diving and hiking, but go several years without partaking in them. This could come across as misleading to a potential date who partakes in these activities regularly. Weight is a common area in which one might present an ideal self as opposed to an honest self. Some users might use older pictures or lie about their weight with the intention of losing it. For some individuals, they might present themselves in a way that is inaccurate but is how they see themselves. This is known as the "foggy mirror" phenomenon.

==== Blogging and online chatting ====
With the advent of the Internet, blogs and online chatrooms have become ubiquitous. Generally, those who blog on a professional level do not disclose personal information; they only disclose information relative to the company they work for. However, those who blog on a personal level have also made a career out of their blogging – there are many who are making money for sharing their lives with the world.

According to Jih-Hsin Tang and Cheng-Chung Wang, bloggers tend to have significantly different patterns of self-disclosure for different target audiences. The online survey that asked 1,027 Taiwanese bloggers examined the depth and breath of what bloggers disclosed to the online audience, best friends, and parents, as well as nine topics they discussed. Tang and Wang (2012), based on their research study on the relationship between the social penetration theory and blogging, discovered that "bloggers disclose their thoughts, feelings, and experiences to their best friends in the real world the deepest and widest, rather than to their parents and online audiences. Bloggers seem to express their personal interests and experiences in a wide range of topics online to document their lives or to maintain their online social networks." Dietz-Uhler, Bishop Clark, and Howard studied online chatting, and noted that "once a norm of self-disclosure forms, it is reinforced by statements supportive of self-disclosures but not of non-self disclosures".

==== Cross-cultural social penetration ====
Studies have rarely considered the differences that cultural nuances can play in social penetration, particularly when it is between two cultures which are either high context or low context. However, it was found that social penetration theory can be generalized to North American-Japanese dyads, which was further supported when comparing the research to the highest level of intimacy marital communication. The same held to be true when it came to analyzing the level of intimacy between different dyads across the spectrum, but it was found that “the results from the analysis of the dispersion scores revealed that mixed dyads had significantly less agreement than low intimacy dyads on the amount of personalized communication and less, but not significantly less, agreement than low intimacy dyads.” Therefore, conflict came more from differences in intimacy than from differences in cultural contexts. The study also found that opposite-sex dyads were generally more personalized than same-sex dyads, regardless of culture. Perceived difficulty of communication had a high negative correlation, suggesting that as communicative difficulty is reduced, a relationship may grow. The opposite was found to be true.

== Criticism ==
One of the common criticisms of SPT is that it can have a narrow, linear approach to explaining how human beings interact with one another and disclose information. SPT also focuses more on early stages of human connection, and does not take into account the various ways people get close, and how multi-layered and varied closer relationships can be. It does not apply as well to coworkers, neighbors, acquaintances, or other forms of fleeting relationships, and has been criticized for assuming all relationships will follow the same direction. Likewise, the theory is criticized for not being as concise when describing established relationships, such as lifelong friends, family members, or couples that have been married for several decades and would presumably be as intimate as possible. Another concept called into question is the idea of reciprocity and when it is the most impactful. It is assumed that reciprocity is highest in the middle stages of a relationship rather than later on as SPT suggests.

Modern researchers have developed their criticism theory, showing that social penetration theory fails to show cultural differences and that relationships are actually not linear. The process of relationship development proves that relationships develop through an irregular trajectory, influenced by both internal and external factors.

== See also ==
- Personal boundaries
