= T. Alexander Harrison =

American painter (1853–1930)

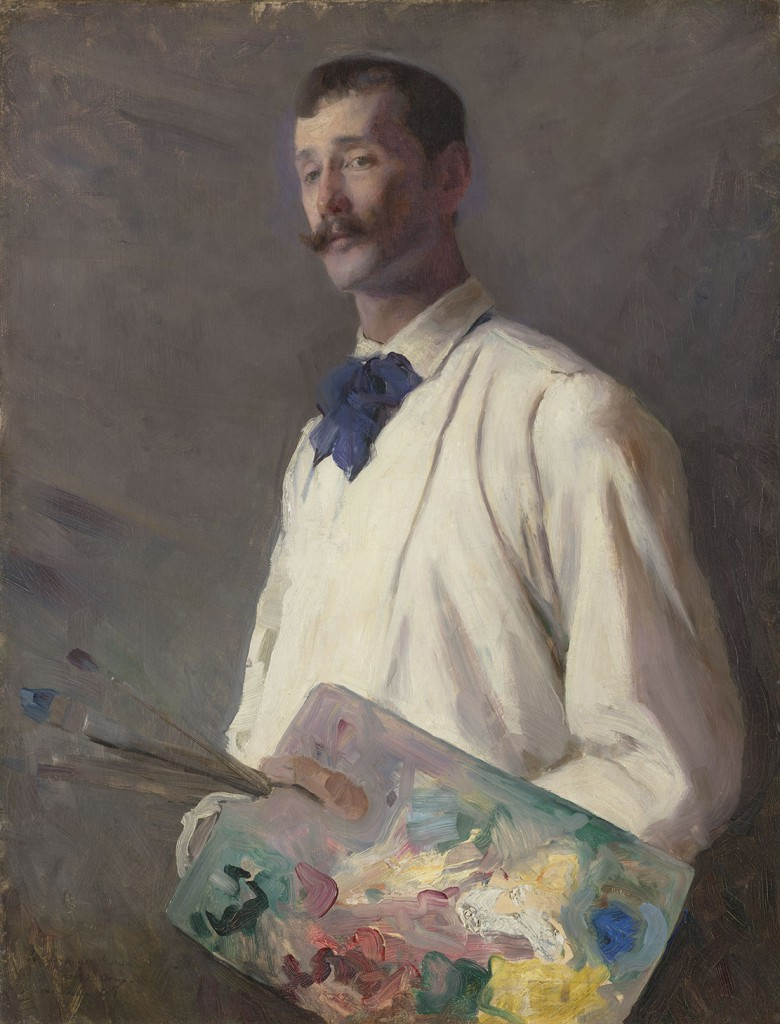
Portrait of Alexander Harrison (1888) by Cecilia Beaux

Thomas Alexander Harrison (January 17, 1853, in Philadelphia, Pennsylvania – October 13, 1930, in Paris, France), was an American marine painter who spent most of his career in France.

== Career ==
He studied at the Pennsylvania Academy of Fine Arts in Philadelphia, 1871-72. For nearly six year he worked as a draftsman for a United States government survey expedition mapping the Pacific coast. He studied for a short time at the San Francisco School of Design. In 1879, he moved to Paris and studied at the École nationale supérieure des Beaux-Arts under Jean-Léon Gérôme and Jules Bastien-Lepage.

Chafing under the restraints of the schools, he traveled to Brittany, where at Pont-Aven and Concarneau he turned his attention to marine painting and landscape.

A figure-piece he sent to the Salon of 1882 attracted attention, a boy daydreaming on the beach, which he called Châteaux en Espagne (Castles in Spain) (1882, Metropolitan Museum of Art). In the 1885 Salon, he had a large canvas of several nude women called En Arcadie (1885, Musée d'Orsay), a remarkable study of flesh tones in light and shade which had a strong influence on the younger men of the day. This received an honourable mention, the first of many awards conferred upon him. Les Amateurs (1882–83, Brauer Museum of Art), was awarded a first medal at the 1889 Paris Exhibition. Other honors included the 1887 Temple Gold Medal of the Pennsylvania Academy of Fine Arts, and medals in Munich, Brussels, Ghent, Vienna and elsewhere.

He was decorated by the Legion of Honour, and was an officier of Public Instruction, Paris. He was a member of the Société Nationale des Beaux-Arts, Paris; of the Royal Institute of Painters in Oil Colours, London; of the Secession societies of Munich, Vienna and Berlin; of the National Academy of Design, the Society of American Artists, New York, and other art bodies.

His reputation rests on marine pictures such as The Wave (1885, Pennsylvania Academy of the Fine Arts), with long waves rolling in on the beach, and great stretches of open sea under poetic conditions of light and colour.

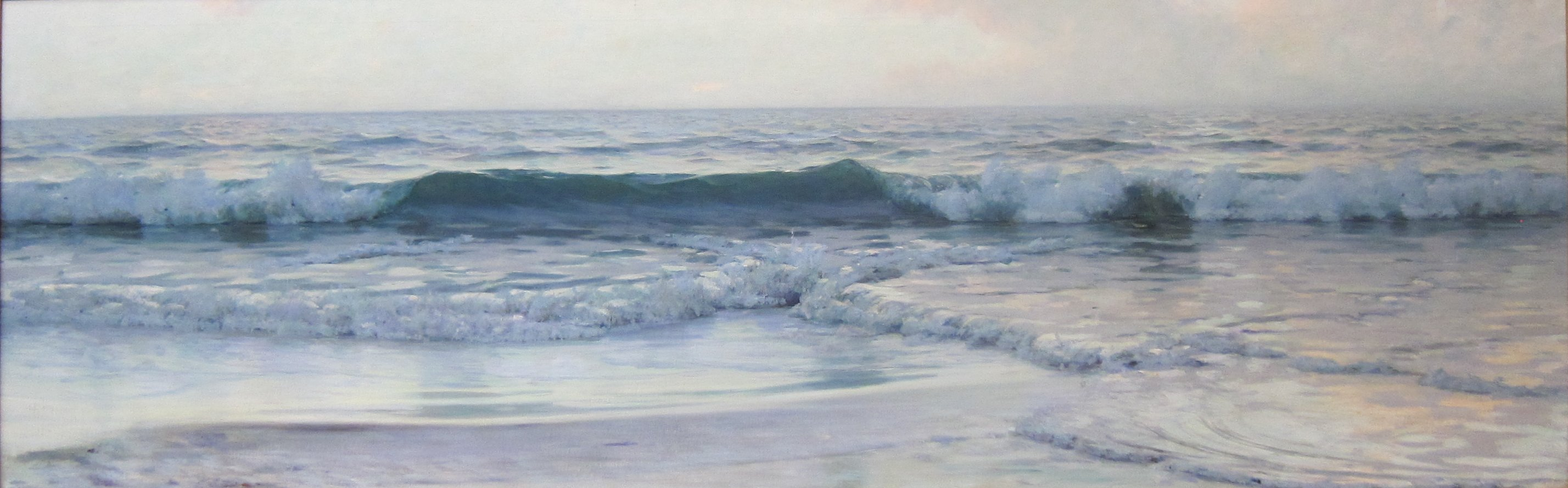
The Wave (1885), Pennsylvania Academy of the Fine Arts, Philadelphia

Cecilia Beaux spent the summer of 1888 in Concarneau, working in a nearby studio. She painted a portrait of Harrison, and wrote of him:

Harrison, now at the apex of his strength, had already met the "Daemon" and thrown him, in his two big pictures En Arcadie and The Wave. Tall, lanky, and superbly handsome, he easily won all he appeared to care for, and much that he didn't want; but he had a religion—it was his art; an industry—it was his painting; and he had an untiring faith toward these. He could not be called a Nature-lover, for he loved Nature perhaps only when married to Art. He saw large and wished to paint large. He was enamoured of the successive opaline surfaces of the low incoming waves and strove for the Sea's gift as it comes to one facing it on long beaches. His method was searching, and had the quality of science, perhaps because he had been trained as an engineer, which profession he abandoned for painting.

== Marcel Proust ==
Harrison rented a ramshackle cottage near the Brittany town of Beg-Meil, and each evening raced to the dunes to watch the sun set over the ocean. In late-summer 1896, he was joined there by struggling writer Marcel Proust and composer Reynaldo Hahn. He opened their eyes to how light plays on water:

We have seen the sea successively turn blood red, purple, nacreous with silver, gold, white, emerald green, and yesterday we were dazzled by an entirely pink sea specked with blue sails.

Harrison seems to have been the inspiration for the character "C," in Proust's attempted first novel Jean Santeuil; along with aspects of the character "Elstir" the painter, in Remembrance of Things Past.

== Family ==
His brother, L. Birge Harrison (1854–1929), was also a painter. Another brother, Butler Harrison (died 1886), was a figure painter.

== Selected paintings ==
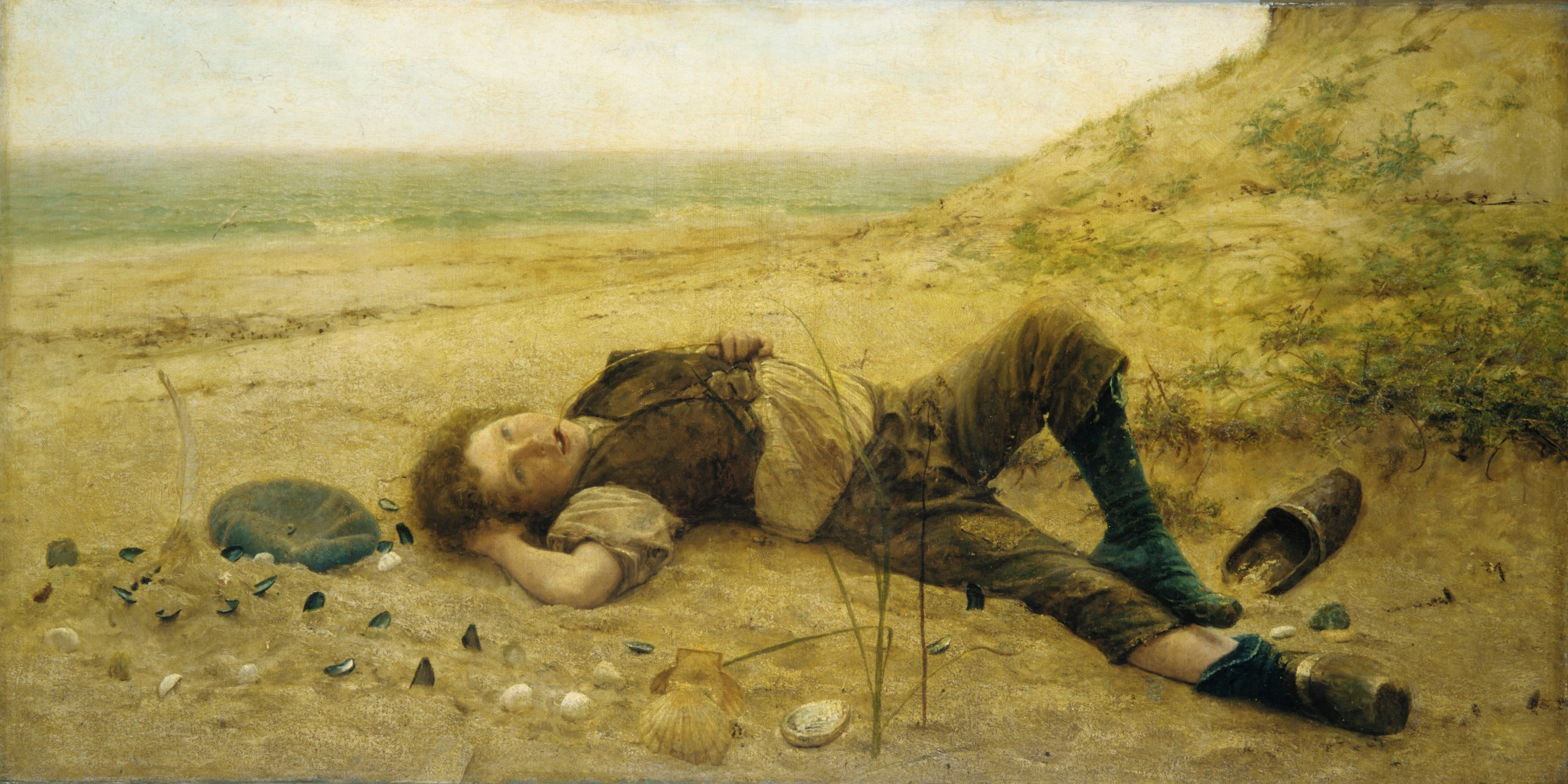
Castles in Spain (1882), Metropolitan Museum of Art, New York City

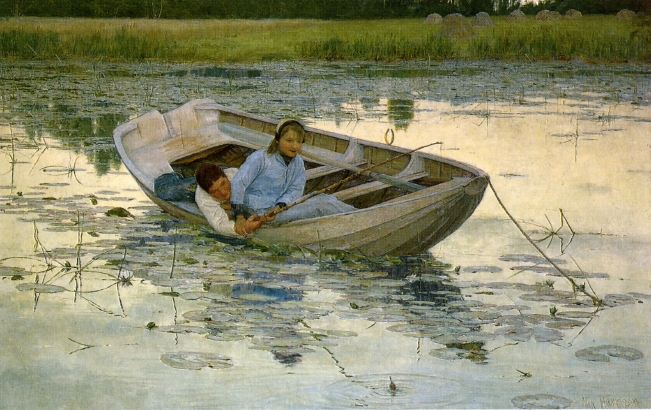
Les Amateurs (1882–83), Brauer Museum of Art, Valparaiso, Indiana

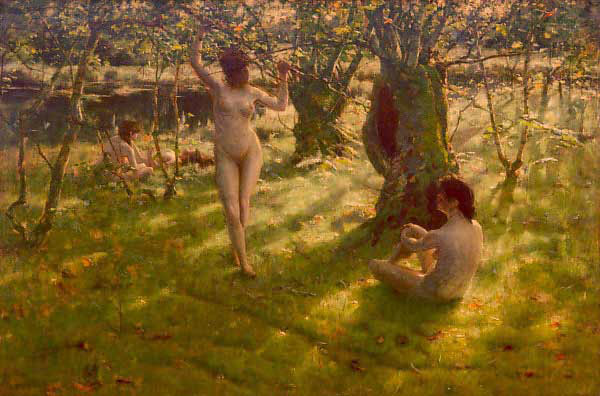
En Arcadie (1885), Musée d'Orsay, Paris

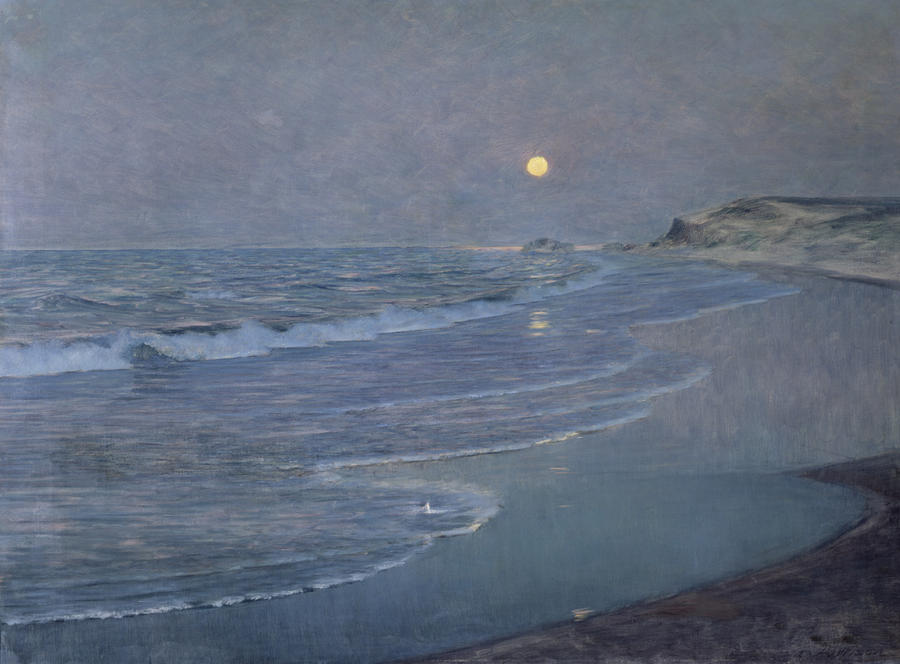
Marine (1892–93), Musée des Beaux-Arts, Quimper, France

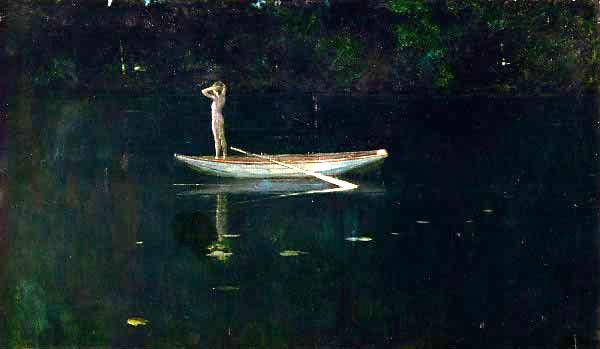
Solitude (1893), Musée d'Orsay, Paris
