= Irwin Altman =

American social psychologist

- Born: June 16, 1930 (age 95); New York City, New York, United States
- Occupation: Social psychologist
- Known for: Social penetration theory

Irwin Altman (born July 16, 1930, in New York City, New York), is a social psychologist who earned his B.A. degree from New York University in 1951, his M.A. degree from the University of Maryland in 1954 and his Ph.D. from the University of Maryland in 1957. He is active in many groups and associations including the International Association of Applied Psychology, American Psychological Association, American Association for the Advancement of Science, American Association of University Professors, Society for the Psychological Study of Social Issues, Society of Experimental Social Psychology, Society of Personality and Social Psychology, Association for the Study of Man-Environment Relations, Environmental Design Research Association, and the Western Psychological Association. He is currently an emeritus faculty member at the University of Utah, Salt Lake City.

== Social penetration theory ==
Altman is famous for his work with Taylor resulting in the social penetration theory, which generally states that as relationships develop, communication moves from relatively shallow, non-intimate levels to deeper, more personal levels. If conversation is pleasant and rewarding, people will offer more information about themselves to each other that covers more areas of their life and is more sensitive to them.

== Environmental psychology ==
Altman also did work in the field of environmental psychology. He believes there is a strong relationship between environmental psychology and social psychology and that the two disciplines have much to offer each other. Altman's Human Behavior and the Environment series added volumes on intellectual traditions (Altman & Christensen 1990), place attachment (Altman & Low 1992), and women and the environment (Altman & Churchman 1994). Much of his work following his Social Penetration Theory looked at human behavior and interactions with the environment.
