= Solitude (Harrison) =

Painting by Thomas Alexander Harrison

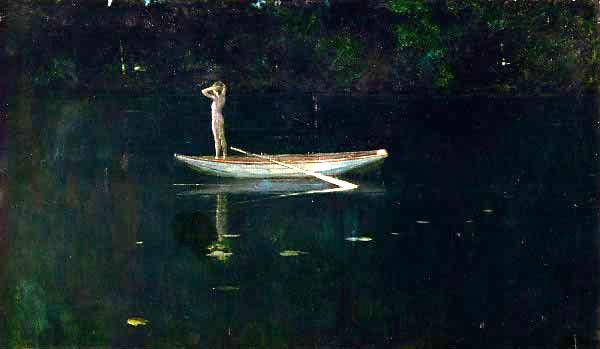
Solitude

Solitude is a painting by Thomas Alexander Harrison. It is oil on canvas, 100 cm x 170 cm. The painting was acquired by the French state from the Salon in 1893 and currently displayed at the Musée d'Orsay in Paris.

== History ==
After purchase the painting was displayed in the Musée du Luxembourg (1894–1922), then in the Jeu de Paume (1922–1946) and then in the Musée National d'Art Moderne (1946–1980). In 1980 it was assigned to the Louvre and put on display at the Musée d’Orsay. It was also exhibited in 2015 at the Collection Lambert in Avignon.

== Description ==
In the middle of the painting, an oar, somehow catching the light, rests gently on the surface of a body of water. In the bow stands a naked figure with elbows raised and hands wedged behind their head. The pose, as well as complete nudity, suggests absolute tranquility. In the background there is an indication of a shoreline towards which the figure is looking. Below this line lies the darkness of the water; above it a subtle use of colour suggests some kind of shore covered in dense, shaded foliage, or possibly the interior of a huge cave. The surface of the water is faintly tinted red here and there, with brief flashes of a distant twilight. Above the scene the Moon rises.
