= Self-disclosure =

Social process

Self-disclosure is a process of communication by which one person reveals information about themselves to another. The information can be descriptive or evaluative, and can include thoughts, feelings, aspirations, goals, failures, successes, fears, and dreams, as well as one's likes, dislikes, and favorites.

Social penetration theory posits that there are two dimensions to self-disclosure: breadth and depth. Both are crucial in developing a fully intimate relationship. The range of topics discussed by two individuals is the breadth of disclosure. The degree to which the information revealed is private or personal is the depth of that disclosure. It is easier for breadth to be expanded first in a relationship because of its more accessible features; it consists of outer layers of personality and everyday lives, such as occupations and preferences. Depth is more difficult to reach, and includes painful memories and more unusual traits that one might hesitate to share. One reveals one's self most thoroughly and discusses the widest range of topics with one's spouses and loved ones.

Self-disclosure is an important building block for intimacy, which cannot be achieved without it. Reciprocal and appropriate self-disclosure is expected. Self-disclosure can be assessed by an analysis of cost and rewards which can be further explained by social exchange theory. Most self-disclosure occurs early in relational development, but more intimate self-disclosure occurs later.

== In intimate relationships ==
=== Social penetration theory ===
Social penetration theory states that the development of a relationship is closely linked to systematic changes in communication. Relationships generally begin with the exchange of superficial information and gradually move on to more meaningful conversations. In order to develop a more intimate relationship, partners must increase the breadth and depth of their conversations. Breadth includes the variety of topics two people discuss and depth is the personal significance of these topics.

Altman and Taylor use a wedge to explain this theory. In this example, the beginning of a relationship is represented by a narrow and shallow wedge because only a few topics are discussed. However, as the relationship goes on, the wedge should become broader and deeper, including more topics of personal significance. The wedge must drive through three "layers" in order for intimacy to develop. The first is superficial "small talk" with little personal information about the speakers. The next layer is intimate, with increasing breadth and depth and more personal details. The third is the very intimate level, where extremely private information is shared.

Intimacy in these relationships can develop only if the persons involved reciprocate disclosures. Intimacy will not develop if only one partner discloses and the other continues to reveal only superficial information. An emphasis on conversational goals can be a predictor of sexual self-disclosure and intimacy. Reciprocity must be gradual and match the intimacy of the other's disclosures. Too rapid, too personal disclosure creates an imbalance in a relationship that can be discomfiting. This gradual process varies from relationship to relationship and can depend on the specific partner with whom one is communicating.

=== Reciprocity and intimacy ===
Reciprocity is a positive response from the person with whom one is sharing information, whereby the person who received the disclosure self-discloses in turn. Self-disclosure usually influences whether two people will want to interact again. Research has shown that when one person self-discloses, another person is more likely to self-disclose. Initially, the process is started by one partner's reveal of personal information to the other partner. In return, the other will disclose something and behave in such a way so as to be responsive to the initial disclosure's content, while also conveying a degree of understanding and validation for what was revealed. Research has found that people who consider themselves to be high in disclosure are likely to be good at eliciting more disclosure from those with whom they interact.

Three theories describe reciprocity: The social attraction-trust hypothesis, social exchange theory and the norm of reciprocity. The social attraction-trust hypothesis says that people disclose to one another because they believe the person who disclosed to them likes and trusts them. Social exchange theory explains that people attempt to maintain equality in self-disclosure because an imbalance in this makes them uncomfortable. The third explanation, the norm of reciprocity, argues that reciprocating disclosure is a social norm and violating it makes a person uncomfortable.

There are two types of reciprocity: turn-taking reciprocity and extended reciprocity. Turn-taking is when partners immediately self-disclose with one another and extended is when disclosure happens over a period of time, in which one partner may be the only one disclosing while the other just listens. Those who engage in turn taking reciprocity are shown to like their interaction partners more than those who engage in extended reciprocity. Turn taking partners are also shown to feel closer and similar to each other and to enjoy the other's company more than extended pairs. This can be explained by the social attraction-trust hypothesis because the partners perceive the discloser as liking and trusting them because they disclosed personal information. Those who engage in extended reciprocity are affected by the social exchange theory and the norm of reciprocity which can account for the lower degree of liking. Since extended reciprocity limits reciprocating disclosure it creates an imbalance in disclosure which violates both of these theories. That said, people usually report that they themselves are disclosing more than is the other partner. This is called perceived partner reciprocity, and it is critical to the self-disclosure process in developing relationships.

Two key components for intimacy are disclosure and partner responsiveness. It is extremely important that when a speaker discloses personal information their partner also discloses something personally relevant. It is also essential that the listener understand, validate and care about what the speaker is disclosing. If the speaker does not feel accepted by the listener then they may not disclose something to them in the future, which stops the development of intimacy. Emotional disclosures are also shown to foster intimacy more than factual disclosures. Factual disclosures reveal facts and information about the self (e.g., "I am divorced from my husband.") while emotional disclosures reveal a person's feelings, thoughts and judgments (e.g., "My divorce was so painful it has made it difficult for me to trust a romantic partner again"). Emotional disclosures can increase intimacy because they allow the listener to confirm and support the discloser's self-view. The transition from sharing impersonal to personal facts is crucial to the building of an intimate relationship. One must feel accepted in order to feel comfortable enough to self-disclose. Without acceptance, one partner will withdraw and fail to reveal personal facts within the relationship. Sharing ourselves also brings us out of our imaginary worlds and allows us to see the realities of the world we live in. We are most comfortable sharing with those whom we like and feel like us. There is also evidence that someone who introduces themself with more intimacy is more likely to facilitate self-disclosure and intimacy with the recipient. Thus, self-disclosure breeds intimacy. This is why we reveal ourselves most and discuss the widest range of topics with our spouses and loved ones.

We often perceive our own self-disclosure as higher than our partner's, which can lead to ill feelings. It is hard for humans to accurately judge how fully another is disclosing to them.

=== Individual differences in reciprocity ===
==== Self-monitoring ====
According to Snyder (1974) self-monitoring is the personality difference in individual's degree of preference to both self-expression and self-presentation. Self-monitoring is a form of impression management in which a person examines a situation and behaves accordingly. Although self-monitoring is measured on a continuous scale, researchers often group individuals into two types: high and low self-monitors. Someone who is a high self-monitor tends to examine a situation more closely and adjusts their behavior in order to "fit in" with others in the scenario. High self-monitors tend to behave in a friendlier and extroverted manner in order to be well liked by peers. A low self-monitor does not do this and tends to follow their own emotions and thoughts when behaving in public. Since they are more attuned to social cues, high self-monitors are generally better at assessing the level of intimacy a partner is disclosing. By noticing these cues, high self-monitors tend to reciprocate equally in their self-disclosures.

This can be explained by the norm of reciprocity because the high self-monitors can pick up on these cues easily and know that they need to respond with their own disclosure. It can also be explained by social exchange theory. Research shows that high self-monitors are more uncomfortable when paired with a low self-monitor because low self-monitors do not tend to disclose intimate details so the balance in the conversation is uneven. High self-monitors are also shown to be the "pace-setters" of the conversation and generally initiate and maintain the flow of a conversation.

==== Mood ====
Those in a positive mood have been found to disclose more intimately than those in a negative mood. This may be because of informational effects whereby happy people tend to access more positive information which leads them to behave in a more optimistic and confident manner. Unhappy people tend to access more negative information which increases the likelihood of cautious, pessimistic and restrained communications.

This may also be due to processing effects, in particular assimilation and accommodation effects. Assimilation effects rely on an individual's prior knowledge to guide their behavior in a situation and accommodation effects rely on careful monitoring of a situation and a greater attention to concrete information. Assimilative processing is ideal for safe, routine situations while accommodative processing is for problematic situations. Happy people tend to use assimilative processing, which leads to more daring and direct disclosures, while unhappy people use accommodative processing, which leads them to be more cautious in their disclosures. These accommodating effects for unhappy people tend to increase reciprocity because these individuals will match the level of disclosure from their partner but will not go beyond that.

However, it can also be said that being distressed, anxious, or fearful (which would be classified as negative mood states) can accelerate disclosure as well. The exception to this is loneliness, for lonely individuals have shown decreased rates of self-disclosure.

==== Gender ====
Whether or not a particular sex shares more readily is a heated debate in social psychology, but sex-role identities play a large part in the amount one chooses to reveal to another. Androgynous people disclose more intimately across contexts than do notably masculine and feminine people.

Research findings on gender differences in self-disclosure are mixed. Women self-disclose to enhance a relationship, while men self-disclose relative to their control and vulnerabilities. Men initially disclose more in heterosexual relationships. Women tend to put more emphasis on intimate communication with same-sex friends than men do.

In relationships, there are still other factors that contribute to the likelihood of disclosure. While people with high self-esteem tend to reveal themselves more, the reverse is also true, where self-esteem is enhanced by a partner's disclosures. In men, self-disclosure and the level of disclosure they perceive from their wives is positively correlated with their self-esteem. For both genders, the state of a relationship and the feelings associated with it are major contributors to how much each spouse reveals themselves. Husbands and wives in a relationship marked with satisfaction, love, and commitment rate their own levels of disclosure highly as well as their perceptions of their spouses' disclosures.

==== Additional individual differences ====
Being shy decreases self-disclosure. Among men, those who are or appear more "tough" are less likely to disclose and express themselves.

Motivation for disclosure is also critical: does the individual need to present themself in a certain way in order to gain certain benefits, and does the self-disclosure match the person's sense of ideal self? We like to present ourselves in ways that we feel are congruent with our own self-concepts, and what we tell others about ourselves often becomes how we actually are.

==== Nature of relationship ====
Both men and women report more self-disclosure in their relationships with friends compared to their romantic partner. Men are more likely to disclose emotional information to their male friends than to their romantic partner. Women report that they disclose more information and receive better advice from their friends than their husbands.

One study on adolescents' self-disclosure suggests that higher self-disclosure between siblings is associated with increased conflict, while higher self-disclosure between friends is not.

==== Sexual ====
Sexual self-disclosure is the act of revealing one's sexual preferences to another, usually to one's sexual partner. This allows an even deeper level of understanding between two people and fosters even more intimacy as a result of the disclosures. Likewise, relationship satisfaction was found to correlate with sexual disclosures. For men, high levels of sexual self-disclosure predicted higher relationship satisfaction, though this was not found to be true for women. But, sexual satisfaction was linked to higher levels of sexual self-disclosure for both men and women. Further, those who disclose more sexually have been found to have less sexual dysfunction.

==== In marriage ====
Self-disclosure is a method of relationship maintenance, aiming to keep partners satisfied with their relationship. Partners learn a shared communication system, and disclosures are a large part of building that system, which has been found to be very beneficial in highly satisfying relationships. Significant positive relationships have been found between multiple measures of relationship satisfaction and the levels of spouses' disclosure on the Social Penetration Scale. Further, affection and support are provided to most in the most important ways through marriage. Surveys done by a variety of researchers have found that people list marriage as the ultimate form of intimacy. Spouses feel responsible, in that they need to be responsive to their partners' self-disclosures, more so than they feel obligated to respond to the disclosures of people in their other relationships.

In a study by Laurenceau and colleagues, several differences were found in the satisfaction of spouses based on their daily-diary recordings of self-disclosures in their daily interactions. The results show that the actual disclosures in the process of self-disclosure may not be the only factors that facilitate intimacy in relationships. Husbands' intimacy was most strongly predicted by self-disclosure, while perceived responsiveness to disclosure was the stronger predictor for wives' feelings of intimacy with their husbands. A different study found evidence of wives' perceptions of their husbands' self-disclosures as being a strong predictor of how long a couple will stay together. Those who think their husbands are not sharing enough are likely to break up sooner. This finding links to the idea of positive illusions in relationship studies. For husbands, the actual act of self-disclosure is more indicative of their feelings of intimacy with their wives. On the other hand, wives are thought to value more the feelings of being understood and validated by their husbands' responsiveness to their disclosures, and this is the more important factor in their feelings of intimacy in their marriages.

Related to these findings, those husbands who reported the highest ratings of global marital satisfaction showed the highest ratings in daily intimacy. Similarly, the wives who rated their global satisfaction highest also had higher levels of daily intimacy. Greater marital satisfaction was found among those who had the higher ratings of intimacy. Further, couples with high levels of demand-withdraw communication rated their average daily intimacy as much lower. This suggests a relationship between one's overall marital satisfaction and the amount of intimacy in a relationship, though no causation can be proven with the present research. Self-esteem has also been found to be a predictor of satisfaction, with couples exhibiting both high self-esteem and high self-disclosure levels being the most satisfied in their relationships.

More disclosures of unpleasant feelings led to less marital satisfaction in recent studies, and disclosure is affected the minute a relationship is stressed, as feelings of less attachment to a spouse promote decreased self-disclosure. Likewise, less intimacy leads to more negative disclosures between partners. However, findings by Tolstedt and Stokes (1984) suggest that the depth of self-disclosure actually increases as the intimacy of a relationship decreases. The breadth of disclosure decreases with decreasing intimacy as originally predicted, but couples actually disclose more deeply. It is speculated that these results come about because a strained relationship causes spouses to restrict their topics of communication (breadth), but that they are also more willing to discuss deeply intimate subjects: the negative ones. Thus, while they are sharing more deeply, it is mostly in a negative light. The researchers then speculated that people might actually avoid disclosing very personal facts in the most satisfying relationships because they are fearful that their positive relationships will be negatively affected.

As time progresses, disclosure in marriage has been found to decrease, often around the time that spouses reach their 40s. It is suggested that at this stage partners know each other quite well and are very satisfied with what they communicate already.

==== Process ====
People first disclose facts then emotions and disclose mostly positive information in the early stages of a relationship. Some speculate that disclosures and their respective responses from a spouse lead to intimacy between the partners, and these exchanges accumulate into global and positive evaluations of the relationship by the couple. In support, studies show that couples who report greater levels of intimacy in self-reports of their daily interactions are also those who report increased global relationship functioning in their marriages. Further, the importance of disclosure in a relationship might change over time as it relates in different ways to various factors of a relationship, such as responsiveness and love, especially at the beginning of a relationship.

=== Effects of group size ===
Disclosure also changes as group size increases. As a group gets larger, people become less willing to disclose. Research has shown that individuals are more willing to disclose in groups of two than in larger groups and are more willing to disclose in a group of three rather than four. The actual disclosures mimic the willingness to disclose as individuals disclose more in pairs than they do in the larger groups. There are also gender differences in disclosure depending on group size. Men feel more inhibited in dyads, match the intimacy of the disclosure from their partner, and do not offer more information. Women, on the other hand, feel more inhibited in larger groups and disclose more personal information in dyads.

=== Effects of the environment ===
The environment is a factor of self-disclosure. The environment has the potential to guide one's decision to disclose personal information in a deeper level. According to Altman, a quiet, dimly lit sit-down restaurant might make one more willing to open up to others rather than uncomfortable seating in a loud food joint. The emphasis on dim lighting suggests that dim conditions were rated as more intimate. The environment can also be manipulated to meet personal privacy and disclosure goals.

== In therapy ==
Nearly every school of thought is in agreement that self-disclosure is a necessary element of therapeutic technique. Self-disclosure by the therapist is often thought to facilitate increased disclosure by the client, which should result in increased understanding of the problem at hand. It helps to acknowledge the therapeutic relationship as a fundamental healing source, as an alliance between client and therapist is founded on self-disclosure from both parties. In some respects it is similar to modeling appropriate social behavior. Establishing common interests between therapists and clients is useful to maintain a degree of reality. Establishing such interests is especially beneficial in therapists' relationships with children, especially teens, who need to understand that the therapist is not an authority in order to fully benefit from therapy.

In studies of self-disclosure in therapy, two types have been identified: immediate and non-immediate. Immediate disclosure shows positive views of the therapeutic process in which the two are engaging and communicates self-involving feelings and information about the therapist's professional background. Many see the benefits of this type of disclosure. Non-immediate disclosure, however, is the revealing of more about the therapist than their professional background and includes personal insight. This type is rather controversial to psychologists in the present day; many feel it may be more detrimental than it is beneficial in the long-run, but there are significant findings that contradict this claim as well.

Further, there are two methods that therapists use to disclose: direct and indirect. Direct disclosures grant the client information about personal feelings, background, and professional issues. Indirect disclosures are those not explicitly granted, such as pictures on the therapist's desk and walls or wearing their wedding band.

=== Therapists' reasons to share information ===
Studies have asked therapists to report their reasons to disclose to clients. The most common reasons are: to answer a direct question from the client, to help soothe the client's feelings of loneliness, to express understanding, to lower a client's anxiety levels and make their feelings seem more normal, and to build rapport.

The topics discussed by therapists who self-disclose in their sessions can vary. The preferred therapeutic approach and the effectiveness of treatments are two of the most common. Many also reveal their views of raising children, stress-coping methods, items that convey respect for the client, and emotions that will validate those the client has expressed. Anecdotes about sexual attraction, dreams, and personal problems seem to be disclosed to subjects with the least frequency by therapists.

=== History ===
The history of therapist disclosure has been a journey based largely on the therapists' perspectives. Early psychodynamic theorists strongly disagreed with the incorporation of therapist self-disclosure in the client-therapist relationship. Sándor Ferenczi notably maintained his belief that self-disclosure was of the utmost importance in children's therapy for traumas in that a neutral, flat therapist would only cause the child to relive the trauma. Object-relations theorists want the client to be able to see how they are seen by another and how what they share is viewed by another, and the best way to operationalize these factors is through a trusting relationship with a therapist who also discloses. Self-theorists believe much the same as object-relations theorists. Intersubjective and relational schools of thought encourage disclosure due to its ability to bring subjectivity into therapy, which they deem a necessary element to real healing. They maintain that therapeutic relationships cannot be initiated and changed without intentional disclosures from both therapist and client.

In contemporary views, most agree with the inevitability of self-disclosure in therapy. Humanistic theorists want to trigger personal growth in clients and feel that a strong relationship with a therapist is a good facilitator of such, so long as the therapist's disclosures are genuine. Seeing that weakness and struggle are common among all people, even therapists, is useful to clients in the humanistic therapy setting. In order for existential psychologists to help clients, they try to disclose their own coping methods to serve as sources of inspiration to find one's own answers to questions of life. For therapists who value feminism, it is important to disclose personal feelings so that their clients have total freedom to choose the correct therapist and to eliminate power fights within the therapeutic setting. The ever-popular cognitive-behavioral approach also encourages disclosure in therapy so that clients can normalize their own thoughts with someone else's, have their thoughts challenged, and reinforce positive expectations and behaviors.

Humanistic theorists have been the highest in rating self-disclosure as part of their normal therapeutic methods. Clearly, today's therapists are mostly supportive of disclosure in therapy, as the early psychoanalytic taboo of such is slowly being overridden through the recognition of many schools of thought. Most identify the benefit of self-disclosures in facilitating rewarding relationships and helping to reach therapeutic goals.

=== Benefits ===
It is useful to discuss personal matters in therapy for a variety of reasons. Certain types of disclosures are almost universally recognized as necessary in the early stages of therapy, such as an explanation of the therapeutic approach to be used and particular characteristics of the therapist. Disclosure with another individual facilitates a closeness in that relationship and is strongly believed to lead to a deeper understanding of the self. One will often see their disclosure in a more positive perspective if it is shared with someone else. It is thought that disclosing the details of a traumatic experience can greatly help with the organization of related thoughts, and the process of retelling is itself a method of healing. An understanding between therapist and client is achieved when the client can share their perceptions without feeling threatened by judgments or unwanted advice. Further, expressing emotions lessens the toll of the autonomic nervous system and has been shown in several studies to improve overall physical health in this way. A disclosing therapist invites their client to compare cognitive perceptions and perhaps realize their own distortions.

The disclosure need not be verbal to be advantageous, as writing about traumas and positive experiences alike has been seen to produce less psychological and physiological distress. The Pennebaker Writing Disclosure Paradigm is a method commonly used in therapy settings to facilitate writing about one's experiences. Exposure theory also offers support in that reliving and talking about a negative event should help the negative affect to be more accepted by the individual overtime through extinction.

A study by Watkins (1990) formulated four model hypotheses for the use of self-disclosure in therapy sessions. Supported heavily is the idea of mutuality: disclosure by one leads to disclosure by the other. The modeling hypothesis suggests that the client will model the disclosures of the therapist, thereby learning expression and gaining skills in communication. Some argue for the reinforcement model, saying that the use of self-disclosure by therapists is purely to reinforce self-disclosure in their clients. Lastly, the social exchange hypothesis sees the relationship between client and therapist as an interaction that requires a guide: self-disclosure. Clients' self-reported improvement when a therapist has used disclosure in therapy is high. Regardless, the benefits of validating the client's thoughts through self-disclosure has been shown to be largely beneficial in the scope of therapy.

Studies have also shown the disadvantageous effects of keeping secrets, for they serve as stressors over time. Concealing one's thoughts, actions, or ailments does not allow a therapist to examine and work through the client's problem. Unwanted, recurrent thoughts, feelings of anxiousness and depression, sleeping problems, and many other physiological, psychological, and physical issues have been seen as the results of withholding important information from others.

The treatment of clients with adjustment disorders, anxiety disorders, mood disorders, and post-traumatic stress disorder have been thought to use self-disclosure techniques the most. Therapy sessions for personality disorders, behavior disorders, impulse control disorders, and psychotic disorders seem to use therapist self-disclosure far less often.

=== Effects on the client's view of the therapist ===
Therapists who self-disclose, especially information that validates or reflects the information disclosed by the client, have been rated in studies consistently as demonstrating more warmth and being more personable. A study using participants who were to imagine themselves in hypothetical counseling situations found that therapists who responded to "What would you do if you were me?" when asked by the client, were viewed as more socially attractive, more expert, and more trustworthy. Their likability was increased by their willingness to disclose to their clients. The three dimensions mentioned have been said to be of utmost importance when determining one's likability. However, these therapists may also been seen as less professional for these disclosures. Additionally, a therapist who discloses too frequently risks losing focus in the session, talking too much about themself and not allowing the client to actually harvest the benefits of the disclosures in the session through client-focused reflection. Much research has found that successful therapy treatments are enhanced when the client has a largely favorable view of the therapist.

=== Environmental contributions to client disclosures ===
The atmosphere in which the therapy takes place is crucial too. Research shows that "soft" architecture and decor in a room promotes disclosure from clients. This is achieved with rugs, framed photos, and mellow lighting. It is thought that this environment more closely imitates the setting in which friends would share feelings, and so the same might be facilitated between counselor and client. Further, a room should not be too crowded nor too small in order to foster good disclosures from the client

=== Effectiveness ===
The efficacy of self-disclosure is widely debated by researchers, and findings have yielded a variety of results, both positive and negative. A typical method of researching such ideas involves self-reports of both therapists and clients. The evaluations of therapists on the positive effects of their own disclosures is far less positive than that of clients' self-reports. Clients are especially likely to assert that the disclosures of their therapists help in their recovery if the disclosures are perceived as more intimate in content. Clients report that disclosures are helpful when they encourage a positive relationship with the therapist, build trust in their therapists' abilities and general person, create a feeling of being better-understood, and make the therapist seem more human. Much of these results, however, are linked to how skilled the therapist is in disclosing.

=== Risks ===
Any information revealed that could reverse the effects of therapy or switch the roles of therapist and client is thought to be the most detrimental. Therapists must choose wisely in what they disclose and when. A client who is suffering greatly or facing a horrific crisis is not likely to benefit much from therapist self-disclosures. If a client at any point feels he or she, should be acting as a source of support to the therapist, disclosure is only hindering the healing process. Further, clients might become overwhelmed if their initial ideas of therapy do not include any degree of self-disclosure from their counselor, and this will not lead to successful therapy sessions either. It is also a risk to reveal too much about a therapist because the client may begin to see the healer as flawed and untrustworthy. Clients should not feel like they are in competition for time to speak and express themselves during therapy sessions.

Despite contradictory findings, self-disclosure is still used frequently in therapy and is often recommended. The American Psychological Association supports the technique, calling it "promising and probably effective". Therapists are advised, however, to use self-disclosure with a mild frequency, to disclose more immediate-disclosure information, to keep intimacy at a minimum, and to keep the focus on the client promptly after disclosure to ensure optimum effectiveness in therapy sessions. Therapist self-disclosure in a counseling setting is ethical so long as the client is not harmed or exploited.

=== Self-involving statements ===
Therapists who use self-involving statements are likely to facilitate valuable self-disclosures from their clients. Using "I" statements, a therapist emits a certain level of care not otherwise felt by many clients, and they are likely to benefit from this feeling of being cared for. In cases of a therapist needing to provide feedback, self-involving statements are nearly inevitable, for they must state a true opinion of what the client has disclosed. These sorts of "I" statements, when used correctly and professionally, are usually seen as especially validating by clients. Largely, the use of self-involving statements by therapists is seen as a way of making the interaction more authentic for the client, and such exchanges can have a great impact on the success of the treatment at hand.

=== Marital therapy ===
Couples-therapy is often centered on creating more intimacy in a relationship. Spouses are encouraged, or even required, to disclose unexpressed emotions and feelings to their partners. The partners' responses are practiced to be nonjudgmental and accepting. Therapists utilize techniques like rehearsal and the teaching of listening skills. Some fear that this is of little long-term help to the couple because in their real lives, there is no mediator or guiding therapist's hand when one is disclosing to another. Teaching proper ways for a couple to disclose to one another might be a beneficial skill therapists can use both for prevention and treatment in therapy sessions.

== During childhood ==
While striving to become more like adults, looking for greater independence, and learning to become more self-reliant, children are also trying to facilitate relationships of equality with their parents. Goals like these, as reported by young people fairly universally, can affect how they disclose to their parents to a large degree. Children's disclosures with their parents has been studied by many, especially recently, after the discoveries of disclosures' positive relationships with children's adjustment levels and psychological and physical health. Some go so far as to use the rate of self-disclosure between parents and children as a dominant measure of the strength of their relationship and its health.

=== Purpose of disclosure ===
In adolescents' relationships with their parents, self-disclosure is thought to serve three key functions:

1. Intimacy is promoted. When information is withheld, distance is created and closeness is nearly impossible to facilitate.
2. Autonomy is regulated. Teens pick and choose what to tell their parents, thus limiting their control over the teens' daily activities.
3. Individuation is heightened. Adolescents' unique preferences and interests are expressed. If these vary from their parents', they establish an identity of their own.

Children still attempt to maintain a certain amount of control over their parents' knowledge of their lives by monitoring how and when to disclose to them. Thus, they moderate their parents' potential reactions. Because of this, it is important for parents to be aware of how they react to their children's disclosures, for these reactions will be used as judgment calls for the children's future sharing.

=== Reasons for ===
Often, the reason for disclosing given by children in studies is based on the parent's expectations: "I've learned that [Mom or Dad] wants to have this information." This is adaptive, in that the child has learned what their parents want to know. Other times a reason is that the children do not want their parents to worry about them, and this is called parent-centered disclosures. Disclosing in order to make oneself feel better or to ensure protection from parents is considered to be another reason for youth to disclose, and it is called self-oriented disclosure. On a more manipulative level, some adolescents report telling their parents things based solely on gaining an advantage of some sort, whether this is the right to reveal less or the fact that being more open tends to result in more adolescent privileges. Sometimes children qualify their disclosures by merely stating that they only disclose what they feel they want to their parents. Thus, some information is kept secret. This is dubbed selective self-disclosure. In sum, adolescents feel different pulls that make them self-disclose to their parents that can be based on the parents' needs and the children's needs. There has not been a distinct pattern found to predict which reasons will be utilized to explain disclosures by different children. For this reason it is widely believed that the reason for disclosure is largely situation- and context- dependent.

=== Benefits ===
The self-disclosure of children to their parents is the dominant source of information for parents to gain knowledge about their children and their daily lives. Parental knowledge of their children's whereabouts and daily lives has been linked to several positive outcomes. The more parents know about their kids, the lower the rate of behavior problems among children, and the higher the children's well-being. Adolescents who disclose have been found to have lower rates of substance abuse, lower rates of risky sexual behaviors, lower anxiety levels, and lower rates of depression. Additionally, those who are well-adjusted, meaning they exhibit the qualities discussed above, generally want and enjoy parental involvement and are likely to disclose more. In contrast, keeping secrets from one's parents has been linked to more physical illness, poor behavior, and depression in all cultural groups. Many theorize that in at least one significant relationship one should feel able to disclose nearly completely in order for a healthy personality to develop. While parental behavioral control was once thought to provide the greatest benefits to children in limiting their activities and serving as a source of forced protection, more recent research strongly suggests that disclosures to parents that provide the parents with information about daily activities actually shows the most promise in fostering positive development through childhood and adolescence.

=== Development of reciprocity ===
Reciprocity in children's self-disclosures is often examined in children's friendships. It has been shown that children's understanding of friendship involves sharing secrets with another person. This mutual exchange of sharing secrets could be the norm of reciprocity, in which individuals disclose because it is a social norm. This norm of reciprocity is shown to begin occurring for children in sixth grade. Sixth graders are able to understand the norm of reciprocity because they realize that relationships require both partners to cooperate and to mutually exchange secrets. They realize this because they possess the cognitive ability to take another person's perspective into account and are able to understand a third person's views which allows them to view friendships as an ongoing systematic relationship.

Children in sixth grade are also shown to understand equivalent reciprocity. Equivalent reciprocity requires matching the level of intimacy a partner discloses, therefore, a high-intimacy disclosure would be matched with an equally revealing disclosure while a low-intimacy disclosure would be matched with little information revealed. Another type of reciprocity is covariant reciprocity, in which disclosures are more intimate if a partner communicates a high-intimacy disclosure instead of a low-intimacy disclosure. This differs from equivalent reciprocity, which matches the level of intimacy, while covariant reciprocity only focuses on whether someone disclosed something personal or not. Covariant reciprocity is shown to begin in fourth grade.

It has also been shown that girls across all ages disclose more intimate information than boys, and that the number of disclosures a child reveals increases with age.

=== Influencing factors ===
Early studies note two distinct factors that contribute to how much children self-disclose to their parents. The first is intra-individual factors, which are those that are on the child's mind and cause them to need social input. Biological development, cultural and social pressures, and individual maturity determine these issues, and, thus, a child's age, personality, and background also contribute to their level and need of self-disclosure in a relationship with a parent.

The second set of factors is called contextual factors, which include the opportunities and situations that the individual has to disclose as created by the sociocultural environment. These are most directly related, then, to the target of the disclosure; these targets are the parents.

Also, gender contributes: girls are noted for usually disclosing their problems, mostly to their mothers, while boys reveal more about bad grades, behavioral conflicts, and other issues to both parents.

Certain people are more likely to get others to disclose. These are called high openers. Even people known to disclose very little are likely to disclose more to high openers. Thus, if parents are characterized as good listeners, trustworthy, accepting, relaxed, and sympathetic, as are high openers, then they will likely elicit more disclosure from their children. Adolescents who view their parents like this are also said to see them as less controlling and less likely to react negatively to their disclosures. Parental responsiveness has been said to be the dominant factor of influence on adolescents' rates of self-disclosure; warmth and affection facilitate more disclosures. Parental psychological control has also been linked to increased self-disclosure of personal issues and peer issues among youth. While this sort of control is not often thought of in a positive light, some hypothesize that these kids are likely just feeling coerced to disclose subtly and without being harmed. Much of what children choose to reveal to their parents is based on previous disclosures and their parents' reactions to them.

Feelings about the parent-child relationship during one's upbringing have also been found to correlate with the child's disclosures to the parents. A child with a positive memory of their relationship with a parent during the past years is a predictor of a higher level of self-disclosure. In fact, the view of the parent-child relationship in the past is a stronger predictor than that of the child's view of the current parent-child relationship. The relationship with the mother, in particular, is extremely predictive of disclosures from adolescents. Such findings suggest to parents that fostering secure attachment early in their children will better set the stage for disclosures in the later years, and their children may then reap the benefits of such a relationship.

Adolescents are able to determine their own amount of parental authority over certain issues by how much or how little they choose to disclose to their parents. Surveys revealed that they are least likely to share information that involves their personal feelings and activities. They actively resist disclosing this to their parents because they do not see the issues as being harmful, or they feel their parents will not listen to them, or because the matters are very private to them.

The way adolescents perceive their parents' authority as legitimate largely impacts how much they feel obligated to disclose to them. The more authority the children believe their parents rightly possess, the more obligation they perceive to share their lives accordingly. Parents who attempt a large degree of psychological control over their children are unlikely to be disclosed to as frequently, which only makes logical sense given the fact that most children are searching for a sense of autonomy. The adolescents have been found to feel the most obligation to tell their parents about such activities as drinking and smoking but less need to disclose information about personal issues. Not surprising either, less obligation is felt as age increases. Contrary to popular belief though, most adolescents in the US do not consider themselves to be adults between the ages of 18 and 27, and their parents feel the same way. The age at which children feel they no longer are obligated to disclose to their parents has increased over time, and the same trend is predicted over the next few decades.

Often, the motivation to disclose negative behaviors is purely because the children fear that they will not get away with it or feel obligated to share. Adolescents also want to disclose more if they feel that the activities in question are out of their own jurisdiction. Jurisdiction is measured, in the adolescents' minds, as how short-term and close the activities are. Short-term, close activities are judged as ones to be handled without disclosure to parents, while activities that will take longer or require the adolescent to be farther from home are thought of as being issues to discuss with parents.

=== Inhibitors ===
Certain events and characteristics of the parent-child relationship make disclosures unlikely:

- Mood: Nervous, angry, or unhappy parents make children less likely to disclose
- Preoccupied: Parents who do not seem accessible to their children do not receive good disclosures
- Reluctance: When parents seem unwilling to talk about problems or consistently avoid certain topics of conversation
- Questioning: Adolescents are bothered by persistent questions that their parents ask of them
- Respect: Children do not disclose as much if they feel their parents are not taking them seriously
- Nagging: When parents seem to hag on unimportant matters, children become frustrated
- Previous disapproval: Adolescents are not likely to disclose if their parents have previously expressed disapproval of a matter they wish to discuss

=== Factors that discourage future disclosures ===
Certain events and characteristics of the parent-child relationship make the child less willing to disclose to that parent in the future:

- Distraction: If parents seem inattentive, the child is not likely to try to disclose in the future
- Respect: Parents who make jokes about disclosures or tease their children discourage future discussions
- Lack of trust: Children are not likely to disclose again when parents have shown doubt about their previous disclosures or checked the information that had been revealed
- Interrupting: Parents who interrupt their children do not encourage future disclosure
- Lack of relatability: Children will not disclose again if they feel their parents did not try to understand their position in previous disclosures
- Lack of receptivity: Parents who seem not to care about the child's thoughts on matters and who will not listen to arguments discourage future disclosure
- Confidentiality: Children feel less inclined to disclose in the future if their parents do not keep their disclosures confidential
- Emotion: Parents who have angry outbursts do not encourage further disclosures from their children
- Consequences: Disclosures that resulted in punishment serve as discouragement for future disclosures. Additionally, long lectures from parents are not viewed as favorable
- Disappointment: When disclosure has made a parent disappointed or sad in their child, the child feels less inclined to disclose again
- Silence: Parents who respond to a disclosure with the silent treatment are unlikely to facilitate later disclosures
- Withholding permission: If earlier disclosure resulted in parents withholding permissions for children to participate in their desired activities, the children often do not disclose such information again later

=== Facilitators ===
Certain events and characteristics of the parent-child relationship make disclosures likely:

- Mood: Positive moods (happy and relaxed) in parents make adolescents likely to begin to disclose
- Accessibility: When parents seem ready and able to chat without doing other things, children want to disclose to them
- Opportunities: Parents who make time for the child, initiate conversations, and prompt disclosures (perhaps with humor) usually facilitate disclosures from their children
- Reciprocal disclosure: Children are encouraged if their parents choose to reveal things about themselves
- Questions: Open-ended questions give adolescents motivation to disclose
- Attention to child's mood: When parents recognize the affective state of a child, the child feels cared for and is likely to be open to discussing the causes of that mood
- Unconditional disclosure: Children feel encouraged to disclose when parents make a point of telling the child to reveal themselves no matter what
- Pace: Letting children choose how and how fast they disclose makes them more likely to reveal things to their parents

=== Factors that encourage future disclosures ===
Certain events and characteristics of the parent-child relationship make the child more likely to disclose to that parent in the future:

- Support: Previous disclosures that have made the child feel emotionally supported positively affect whether or not they will disclose to a parent again
- Humor: Parents who can appreciate humor in disclosure, where appropriate, encourage the child to disclose again
- Reciprocity: Parental disclosure makes a child more likely to disclose to that parent again
- Understanding/empathy: A parent who makes an obvious attempt to understand the child's position makes the child more willing to share in the future.
- Attention: Children will likely disclose again when they believe their parents are giving them their full attention without interruption
- Appreciations: Parents who express to their adolescents that they value their disclosures encourage such to happen again
- Respect: Children want to disclose again if they feel their parents take them seriously
- Confidence in the child: Parents who express their trust in the child's ability to handle their problems will likely be disclosed to in the future
- Trustworthiness: Adolescents will want to reveal information to their parents again if they trust that the disclosure will be confidential
- Advice: If parents offer good advice and help for a youth's problems, they are prompted to discuss things with the parent later on
- Reactions: Parents will often be told information from their children again if they keep their reactions to disclosures calm
- Discussion: Children prefer to talk about their issues, so if adults are willing, children will likely open up to them often
- Receptivity: Adults who consider arguments from the child and "hear them out" encourage these children to reveal their thoughts again
- Results: If permissions for adolescents' wishes have been granted after disclosing in the past, the child is more likely to disclose in the future

== On the Internet ==
There are four major differences between online communication and face to face communication. The first is that Internet users can remain anonymous. Individuals are more likely to speak more courageously online compared to how they would during in-person interactions when they are communicating anonymously online, a phenomenon known as the online disinhibition effect. The user can choose what personal information (if any) they share with other users. Even if the user decides to use their own name, while communicating with people in other cities or countries they are still relatively anonymous. The second is that physical distance does not limit interaction on the Internet the way it does in real life. The Internet gives the ability to interact with people all over the world and the chance to meet people who have similar interests that one may not have met in their offline life. Visual cues, including those pertaining to physical attractiveness, are also not always present on the Internet. These factors have been shown to influence initial attraction and relationship formation. Finally, Internet users have time to formulate conversations which is not allotted in face to face conversation. This gives a user more control in the conversation because they do not have to give an immediate response.

=== Features of online interaction affecting disclosure ===
==== Anonymity ====
Anonymity can allow individuals to take greater risks and discuss how they truly feel with others. A person might take these risks because they are more aware of their private self. Private self-awareness is when a person becomes more aware of personal features of the self. This is in contrast to public self-awareness in which a person realizes that they can be judged by others. This type of awareness can lead to evaluation apprehension, where a person fears receiving a negative evaluation from their peers. Public self-awareness is also associated with conforming to group norms even if they go against personal beliefs. With that said, the absence of visual cues from a partner in Internet discussion can activate a person's private self which encourages self-disclosure. This is because the discloser is not worried about being judged publicly and is able to express their own private thoughts. Anonymity also aids in identity construction. A person can change their gender and the way they relate to others due to anonymity. This can increase life satisfaction because those who can identify with multiple roles are shown to be more satisfied. Since the Internet can allow someone to adopt these roles, that close others may not accept in the real world, it can increase their self-worth and acceptance.

The anonymity that comes with Internet communication also makes it easier to reveal the "true self". The "true self", as described by McKenna and her colleagues includes the traits a person possesses but is unable to share freely with others. What they do share is the "actual self" which includes traits they do possess and are able to be shown in social settings. The actual self can be easier to present in face to face conversations because a person's true self may not fit societal norms. Disclosing one's "true self" has been shown to create empathetic bonds and aid in forming close relationships.

Anonymity can also help stigmatized groups reveal their "true selves" and allow them to come together to discuss aspects of the self that cannot be discussed in one's social circle. This can help them in life because it allows them to form a group of similar others and the opportunity to receive emotional support. It has also been found that those who join these groups and disclose their identity were more likely to share this aspect of the self with their close family and friends. Sharing these long kept secrets has also shown to significantly reduce health symptoms over a length of time.

There are some negative consequences to being anonymous on the Internet. Deindividuation, where self-awareness is blocked by environmental conditions, can occur and be problematic. Some consequences of deindividuation include the reduced ability to control one's behavior and engage in rational, long-term planning, and the tendency to react immediately and emotionally. A person who is lacking this self-awareness is also less likely to care about other's opinions of their behavior. This all can lead to increased hostility towards others and the formation of anonymous hate groups.

There can also be some negative consequences to forming multiple selves. If these identities are not integrated it can lead to an incomplete sense of self. They could also be brought into the real world and lead to delusional and unrealistic behavior.

One downside to all of the connections that can be formed online regards the effect called the "illusion of large numbers." This effect means that people overestimate how many people share the same opinion as them. This can be especially harmful if someone holds negative views of a particular group because they may not realize that their views are very different from the mainstream.

==== Lack of visual cues and physical attractiveness ====
Physical attractiveness plays an important role in determining if two people will begin a relationship. In face to face conversation, if initial attraction is not present, the relationship is less likely to form. This, however, does not play a role in Internet communication. Relationships online must form based on things such as similarities, values, interests or an engaging conversation style. Since these relationships form at a deeper level they may be more durable and more important to the individual. Not being seen also assists in presenting ideal qualities (attributes an individual would ideally like to possess) to other users because there is no information to contradict what they say, the way there is in face to face conversation. This can help a person make these ideal qualities a social reality because when someone confirms these traits the individual can make them a part of their self-concept.

An individual is also liked more on the Internet than in face to face conversation. Even if partners think they are communicating with two different people they still like the person from the Internet more than the face to face interaction, even though they were the same person. This greater liking also continues after the initial interaction on the Internet when the pair meets face to face. This greater liking may occur because of the lack of physical information. Physical attractiveness plays an important role in impression formation and once these views are formed they are not likely to be changed even when presented with new information. Since the people communicating online cannot rely on attractiveness these factors may not play a role when they eventually meet face to face. An increase in disclosures can also foster this liking because intimate disclosure is associated with increased intimacy. Online disclosures are generally seen as more intimate than face to face disclosures. Since there is a lack of nonverbal cues in Internet communication, many people form a biased perception of their communication partner. The minimal cues that are available in computer based communication are often over interpreted and the person will attach greater value to them. For example, if there seems to be a similarity between the two communicating, an individual may intensify this perception and idealize their partner. This all then increases the perceived intimacy of the discloser.

==== Physical distance and familiarity ====
People are more likely to form relationships with those who are in close physical proximity of them. Individuals are also more likely to begin an interaction with someone who is seen on a regular basis, showing that familiarity also influences interactions. Communicating on the Internet can allow individuals to become familiar with those who frequent the pages they converse on by recognizing usernames and pages. Regardless of how far away these individuals may be from each other, they are all in one confined space on the Internet which can give the feeling of being in the same place. The Internet also brings people together that may not have met because of physical distance. They can also go to specific websites where people share the same interests so they enter conversations knowing they already have similarities. This can contribute to why Internet relationships form so quickly. These online users do not have to go through the traditional stages that face to face interactions require in order to find similar interests. These face to face interactions usually take longer to find common ground but online users are able to dive right into conversations.

==== Pace and control of conversation ====
Internet communication differs significantly from face-to-face conversation in the timing and pacing of a conversation. For example, both users do not need to be online at the same time to have a conversation. E-mail, for example, allows individuals to send messages and wait for a reply that may not come for hours or even days. This can allow many people to stay in touch, even if they are in different time zones, which significantly broadens the range of communication.

This communication also allows an individual to take their time when speaking with someone. They do not have to have an immediate response that face-to-face conversation requires. This allows them to carefully select and edit their messages and gives them more control over their side of the conversation that they would not have outside of the Internet. There are also no interruptions in online communication that occur in face-to-face conversation. A person is able to "hold the floor" and say as little or as much as they would like in these communications, allowing them to fully form their point.

This control helps users to take greater risks with their self-disclosures online. These people also begin to incorporate their Internet lives with their non-Internet lives and engage in a presence–control exchange. In this exchange, Internet users start their relationships with relatively high control and gradually trade that for physical closeness as their comfort levels and knowledge of the other person increases. This seems to be the Internet version of social penetration theory, where individuals have a mutual exchange of self-disclosures. As the relationship develops in face-to-face communication the individuals' disclosures gradually become more revealing and cover a wide range of topics. This equivalent on the Internet includes the partners exchanging control of the conversation for physical closeness. The stages this occurs in could include moving from messaging online, to telephone conversations and eventually face-to-face communication.

=== Individual differences ===
==== Self-esteem ====
The use of social media for self-disclosure has shown to be very helpful for those with low self-esteem. People with low self-esteem are more socially anxious and shy which can make it difficult to form close relationships with others. This can harm both their physical and mental health because feeling connected to others is considered a fundamental human motivation. Individuals with low self-esteem have difficulty disclosing to others because they are very focused on not revealing their flaws and fear criticism and disapproval from others. Disclosing less, therefore, protects them from the possibility of rejection or being ignored. In light of these fears, social media can provide a safe environment for people with low self-esteem to disclose personal information because they cannot see their partner's reactions which can help them to more freely express themselves.

While many with low self-esteem do view social media as a safe outlet for disclosure, many do not receive positive feedback for their disclosures. People with low self-esteem tend to post more negative thoughts on social media which has been shown to make them less liked by readers. Negative posts are also more likely to be ignored by readers in hopes that the discloser will stop and begin to post more positively. When someone who frequently shares negative thoughts posts something positive they do receive more positive feedback from readers. In contrast, someone with high self-esteem is more liked by readers and tends to post more positively. If they do post something negative they tend to get more responses than those with low self-esteem do.

==== Loneliness ====
Social media can also help those who are lonely. Many social networking sites give access to profiles, pictures and the ability to comment and message others which helps people to feel less lonely. It also aids them in gaining social capital like emotional satisfaction and access to information. These sites can facilitate disclosure because they make it easier to access others who can provide social support for someone to disclose personal information. Social support is extremely important in disclosure as it makes the discloser feel validated and cared for. Social support is also positively related to well-being. It has also been shown that having this social support and forming close relationships online decreases loneliness overtime.

Some research does show that spending too much time on the Internet and forming these close relationships could take away time from existing non-Internet relationships. Neglecting these relationships could make a person lonelier in the long run because they could lose these face to face relationships.

However, other research shows that there are certain personality traits that lead to increased loneliness which then leads to increased use of the Internet. In particular, extroversion and neuroticism have been linked to loneliness. An extrovert is someone who is outgoing, enjoys the company of others, requires stimulation, and is spontaneous, while an introvert prefers their own company, is quiet, and prefers quiet, small gatherings. Introverts can often be seen as distant and unfriendly because of this behavior which may explain some of their loneliness. A neurotic person is extremely anxious, emotional and reacts in a disproportional way to many situations. Someone high in neuroticism generally has a negative attitude which may push people away and prevent them from forming close relationships which may lead to their loneliness. Both of these groups (introverts and neurotics) have been shown to have increased Internet use and in particular increased use of social service sites (i.e. chatrooms, newsrooms, etc.). This may show that those who are already lonely are more attracted to the Internet as a means of social networking and not that the Internet increases loneliness. Introverts and neurotic individuals have also been shown to feel more comfortable revealing their "true-self" online than in face-to-face conversation and revealing the "real you" has been shown to help the discloser to form close relationships.

==== Social anxiety ====
It can be very difficult for those with social anxiety to engage in face to face communication. These people can become anxious when meeting someone for the first time, speaking with someone attractive, or participating in group activities. This can limit their in-person interactions and deny them their basic needs of intimacy and belonging. With the absence of many of these worries in Internet communication, many with social anxieties use it to form social connections. It has been shown that individuals with social anxiety are more likely to use the Internet to form close relationships. These relationships are also shown to be stronger online relationships as opposed to weaker relationships (i.e. "acquaintances"). Forming these relationships can also help a socially anxious person express their true-self and form their social identity. This identity often involves the groups a person is a part of because belonging to a group frequently becomes a part of one's self-concept. Someone with social anxiety would be denied this because of their fear of face-to-face interaction. Therefore, disclosing with others online gives a socially anxious person access to a wide variety of people with which they can form relationships and belong to a group.

Socially anxious people are also shown to become less anxious over time if they have formed close online relationships. They have also been shown to broaden their social circles in the "real world" when they have had this time to form online relationships. One possibility for this occurrence may be that these online relationships can give the anxious individuals confidence in forming relationships outside of the Internet. Being able to practice communications online can show them they are capable of communicating and can lessen their anxieties in face to face communication. They are also very likely to bring their online relationships into their offline lives in order to make them a "social reality" by sharing these relationships with family and friends in the real world.

=== Online support groups ===
Online support groups are another place where people from all over can come together to disclose common struggles. They provide an environment of mutual disclosure and support. People are more likely to use these forums to discuss personal struggles and disclose emotions and thoughts pertaining to these struggles than normal discussion forums. There is also a higher degree of reciprocity in online support groups than in normal discussion forums and reciprocity has been shown to help people feel valued after disclosing. Men and women are also equally likely to use these forums for disclosing personal information.

=== Dangers ===
While there are many benefits to engaging in self-disclosure online there are also some dangers. There is a relationship between Internet abuse, self-disclosure and problematic behavior. Internet abuse can be defined as, "patterns of using the Internet that result in disturbances in a person's life but does not imply a specific disease process or addictive behavior." When a person is high for Internet abuse and high for self-disclosure it can lead to dangerous behaviors like sending personal information (addresses, home phone number etc.) and photos to online acquaintances. High ratings for Internet abuse and self-disclosure also positively influence online communication with all types of online relationships. These relationship types include long-distance relationships, in which people have met face to face and continue the relationship by communicating online; purely virtual relationships, where people meet online and stay in touch only by using the Internet; and migratory mixed-mode, where the relationship begins online and then proceeds to face to face interaction. The relationship between Internet abuse, self-disclosure and dangerous behaviors could pose an even bigger problem with the high number of communications this group has with others, particularly those they have only communicated with online.

=== Children ===
The Internet, while providing most with a source of entertainment, knowledge, and social realms, is actually a large threat to children due to the ways in which they self-disclose. Their privacy is often more at risk than is an adult's because of their openness to sites. Given that they are still developing, researchers say that they are in the "Cued Processors" group between the ages of eight and eleven. At this time, many children are using the Internet and are doing so alone, without the guidance and overseeing of an adult/guardian. Thus, they must use their own judgments to decide how much information to share on the various sites they visit.

As "Cued Processors", children are generally able to apply logical thinking to concrete situations, but may have difficulty understanding abstract risks, such as the potential misuse of information shared online. They may not fully consider the consequences of disclosing personal details, which can create opportunities for online marketers and predators. Combined with behavioral profiling technologies, tracking systems can be used to create profiles based on children's online activities and personal information. A common strategy involves the use of characters in online games that request information from users, as children may be more likely to share personal details in these contexts. Children's vulnerability online is partly associated with their cognitive development and limitations in risk assessment.

Uses and gratifications theory is often used to attempt to explain such things as motivation on the Internet. Studies have found that, if applied to the use of the Internet by children and their likelihood to disclose personal information, one can find significant correlations with various types of motivation. Children who use the Internet primarily as a source of information are less likely to give out personal information. Some theorize that these children are simply made to be more aware of the dangers of Internet disclosures and are more cautious because of this. But, children who mention social contact on the Internet as their first-order use are more often the ones who submit to the attempts of online marketers and predators who seek their personal contact information and behavioral preferences. These children have goals of social acceptance in mind, and it seems to them that acceptance can be easily gained from sharing and communicating with friends and strangers alike. Socializing motives reduce privacy concerns, and children will disclose nearly anything online in order to be seen and responded to socially. It was also discovered that a simple incentive is usually enough to elicit personal information from a child.

Parents' knowledge of their children's Internet use is rapidly decreasing. Children are withholding more and more from their parents, including how much information they are sharing over the Internet. Parent-child self-disclosure about this topic needs to be increased if interventions are to help keep children safer online. Notably, there are many parents who have even admitted to allowing their children to lie about their ages on social media sites in order to gain access to them. Parents, thus, are encouraged to remain open to discussing such things with their children, to use better judgment themselves when making decisions about their children's Internet usage, and to provide them with education about how privacy on the Internet is a risky notion.

Today, many regulations are being proposed and implemented that will hopefully help protect children's personal information on the Internet. However, these will not be enough to guarantee safe exchanges of self-disclosure, so adults still must be open to discussion with their children.

== In education ==
Self-disclosure is an important matter to consider in the realm of education. The varying ways that it can impact social relations adds a new and important dynamic to the classroom. There are different results and experiences that students and teachers see from the implementation of self-disclosure in the classroom. The relationships that will be addressed through the lens of self-disclosure include the student to teacher relationship, the student to student relationship and how cultural relations impacts the situation as a whole.

=== Student to teacher relations ===
The tone of the classroom is set by the attitudes and behaviors of those who participate in it. The teacher often has the most powerful role in leading a classroom and how that class will interact and connect through the subject matter. The practice of self-disclosure in the interactions between the teachers and the students has an impact on the classroom atmosphere and how the people perform in that atmosphere. The decision to practice self-disclosure as a teacher has many benefits and challenges.

==== Benefits ====
When the teacher engages in self-disclosure with the students, it opens up a new channel of communication in the classroom. As the teacher shares more information about who they are and their personal life, the students begin to see a new side of their teacher that is more than the person that stands in the front of their classroom every day. The teacher is seen as a real person with their own difficulties and struggles in life. This would allow the teacher to appear more relatable to the students which would promote better student to teacher communication. Of course, the information shared with the class must be appropriate and relevant. A teacher may use an illustration of a concept using an example from their own life in order to connect with a particular audience in the class. These connections with the teacher promotes a more productive relationship.

As the teacher sets the tone of self-disclosure, students feel more willing to share in the practice of self-disclosure as well. The teacher demonstrates and helps to guide the students in understanding what is appropriate information to share in public discourses. As the students feel more comfortable with the teacher and begin sharing more about their own lives, the environment of the classroom is one of camaraderie and friendship. Even in online education settings, students will tend to disclose personal information or traumatic experience to faculty to seek support. By understanding the people in the classroom on a deeper level can open up opportunities to provide support to those involved. The teacher can better understand who the students are, what they struggle with, what their strengths are and what they need to succeed. This is important when it comes to disability accommodations where the more comfort a student has with faculty the more likely they are to disclose information about a disability and seek accommodations. Self-disclosure from student to teacher allows the teacher to best support the students based on their individual needs, therefore providing an improved education.

==== Challenges ====
With implementing self-disclosure into the classroom, comes a set of negative consequences and challenges. As the teacher shares more about their personal life, the students may become overly comfortable with the teacher. This could lead to a lack of respect for the teacher or an inability to maintain appropriate superior relationship. Self-disclosure may blur the lines of the roles between the student and the teacher, which could disrupt the authority the teacher needs to maintain their role in the classroom and have an effective teaching persona. There is the case that not all students will connect to this method of teaching. Some students may not choose to participate in this environment which could lead them to feel alienated. Self-disclosure from the teacher needs to be taken into deep consideration so that the sharing of information does not take away from the education being transferred. In spite of the challenges associated with self-disclosure in the classroom, self-disclosure does enhance greater pro-sociality, better empathy to people's emotions, and greater interpersonal relations through shared neuronal response.

There are some risks involved in bringing self-disclosure into the classroom when students begin sharing information with the teacher. As the student is more open with the teacher, there is the chance that the student could share information that would require the teacher to follow a reporting procedure. If a student reveals information about themself in confidence to the teacher that implies that the students life is potentially at risk, or other matters of equal seriousness that would need to be reported to the school guidance counselor. Revealing this information although confidentiality was implied would inevitably break the trust the teacher has built with the student, ultimately harming their relationship. This hurt relationship could negatively impact that students ability to learn in the classroom. In another scenario, students may not fully understand the differences between public and private discourse. This would lead students to have conversations of self-disclosure in the classroom when the timing is not appropriate, therefore, taking away from the educational matters at hand.

== Culture ==
Self-disclosure, just like anything varies and differs depending on the culture. Collectivistic culture and individualism are two types of ways to explain self-disclosure in a culture. If a country is more on the collectivistic side then they will tend to disclose themselves more as an Avatar, like in China and Germany. However, in a more individualist culture setting people open up more about themselves, even personal details, like in America. There is also a difference in the boy vs. girl culture. Girls tend to open up more and easier than most boys.

Each culture has a different idea about what and how much self-disclosure is acceptable. For example, American students tend to share more in class with their peers than Chinese students. They are usually more open about themselves and interests with most of their classmates than students in other countries. The difference is seen in the internet as well. Korean students usually talk more in blog form on social media pages keeping the posts short and to the point. However, American students share more often and share more personal information to their followers. Cultures like Korea and China, the collectivistic cultures, are more reserved whereas, the American culture is more about disclosing a lot of personal details.

One reason someone may choose not to disclose is due to the fear of being stigmatized. Instinctively, we categorize individuals into in-groups and out-groups based on perceived characteristics that they have. When people have characteristics that distinguish them from other members of the dominant culture, they often become stigmatized. Some people have concealable stigmas that are only revealed through disclosure, so the fear of being stigmatized keeps them from disclosing to others.

== See also ==
- Self-concealment
- Four-sides model
- Outline of self
- Social penetration theory
- Coming out
