= Big Two derby =

Association football derby in Belfast

Big Two Derby
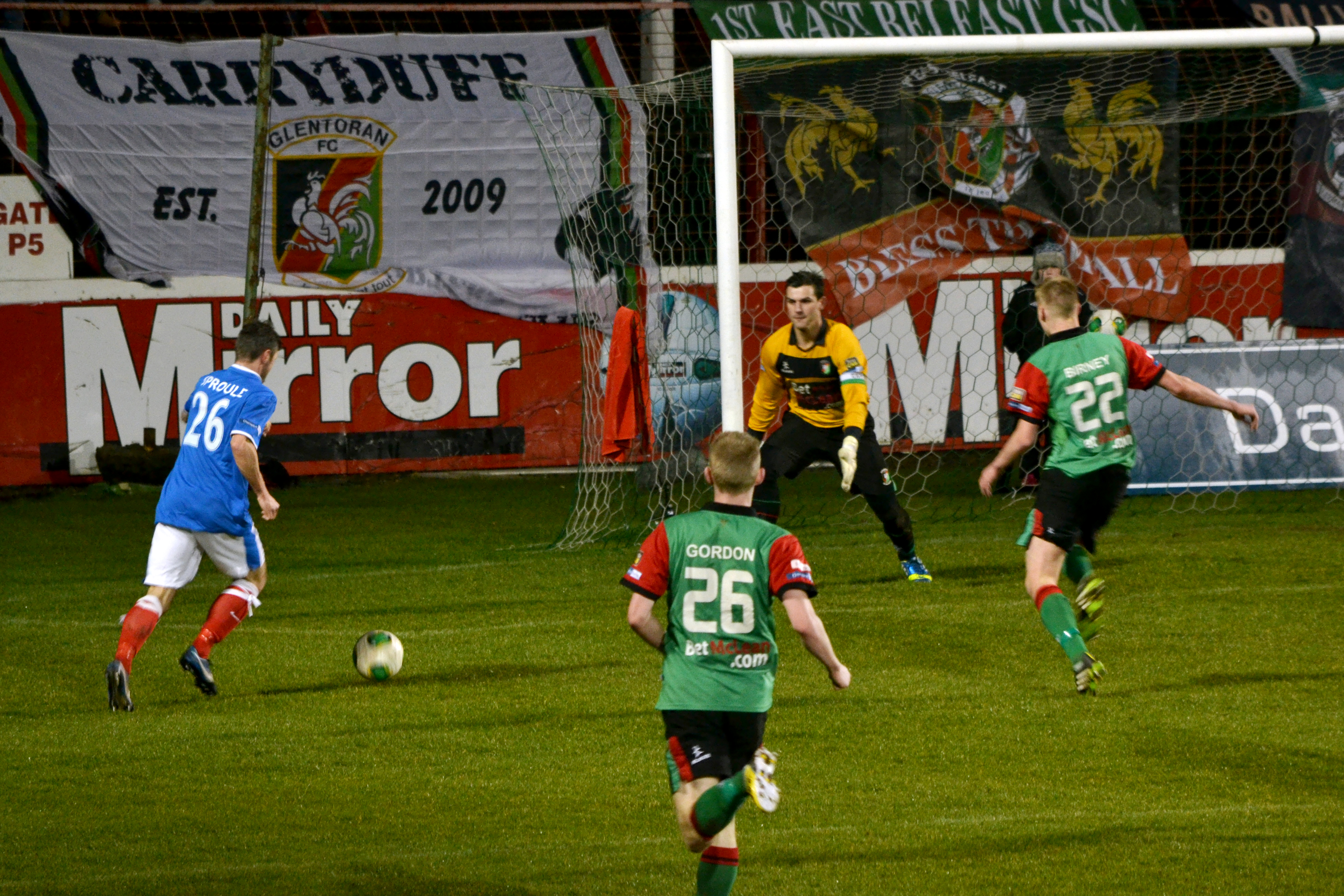
- Linfield play Glentoran at The Oval in 2014
- Location: Belfast, Northern Ireland
- Teams: Glentoran; Linfield
- First meeting: Linfield Athletic 3–1 Glentoran; Friendly (1 October 1887)
- Latest meeting: Linfield 1–0 Glentoran; BetMcLean Cup (15 March 2026)
- Next meeting: TBC
- Stadiums: The Oval (Glentoran); Windsor Park (Linfield)

Statistics
- Total meetings: 654 (competitive, not including wartime)
- Most wins: Linfield (307)
- All-time series: Linfield – 307; Glentoran – 193; Draws – 154
- Largest victory: Linfield 8–0 Glentoran; Irish League (21 November 1891)

The Big Two derby, also referred to simply as the Big Two or Bel Classico, is the name given to the association football derby between Belfast clubs, Linfield and Glentoran. The derby is also sometimes referred to as the Belfast derby. They are the two most successful and most supported clubs in Northern Ireland league football. They traditionally face each other on Boxing Day each year which usually attracts the largest NIFL Premiership attendance of the season. They regularly play each other in the league, and have contested more cup finals together than any other two clubs. They also make up two of the three clubs (along with Cliftonville) that have competed in every season of Northern Ireland's top flight since its inception in 1890 – neither club ever suffering relegation.

Although Linfield and Glentoran have been the two most successful clubs in the domestic game to date, Linfield has won all three of the current major domestic trophies more than any other club. They have won more than twice as many league titles as their rivals, with Linfield having won 57 league titles to Glentoran's 23. Linfield has also lifted the Irish Cup a record 43 times to Glentoran's 23, and has won the League Cup a record ten times to Glentoran's 7.

== History ==
The term "Big Two" did not always refer to Linfield and Glentoran. Up until 1949, the big two were considered to be Linfield and Belfast Celtic as they had traditionally been the most successful teams in Northern Irish football. Given the traditional political following of both clubs (Linfield, like Glentoran, with a mainly unionist following, and Belfast Celtic with a mainly nationalist following), sectarian violence between supporters of both clubs was common. This culminated with a riot on 26 December 1948 at Windsor Park that saw three Celtic players injured by Linfield supporters, including striker Jimmy Jones, who sustained a broken leg. Belfast Celtic left the Irish League at the end of the season and Glentoran became Linfield's biggest rivals.

Both teams are predominantly Protestant, although Glentoran fielded Catholic players and had Catholic fans for much of its history. Linfield fielded relatively few Catholic players before the 1980s, which led to an accusation that the club had a policy of not signing Catholic players similar to Scottish team Rangers. The existence of such a policy has been disputed by some, including well-known local journalist Malcolm Brodie. Support is split geographically, with Linfield based in the south of the city and Glentoran in the east. Although both based in Belfast, they are separated by the River Lagan and are in two different counties. Linfield is based in County Antrim and Glentoran is based in County Down, although Glentoran and other County Down-based sides compete in the County Antrim Shield.

The first game of which there is any record between Linfield and Glentoran took place on 1 October 1887. A friendly match played at King's Field, Westbourne in Ballymacarrett was won 3–1 by Linfield (then known as Linfield Athletic), with goalscorers Torrans (2) and Vance, and Glentoran's goalscorer unknown. The two teams played each other competitively for the first time in the inaugural Irish League season, with Linfield winning 7–0 at Musgrave Park on 18 October 1890, and 6–0 at Ulsterville Avenue on 21 March 1891. The first game at The Oval took place on 8 October 1892, and the first game at Windsor Park on 2 September 1905. Linfield previously played at a ground in Ulsterville Avenue, Belfast, before moving to Windsor Park, which is within walking distance of their old ground. Also the home of the Northern Ireland national football team, they have played at Windsor Park ever since.

In 1941, during World War II, The Oval – including terraces, offices, kits and club records – was destroyed in a bombing raid on the nearby Harland & Wolff Shipyard. Glentoran approached Distillery to play at Grosvenor Park, which they did until The Oval was rebuilt in 1949, with help from other Irish League clubs, most notably Distillery and Cliftonville. Glentoran considered leaving senior football to become a junior club, but after being lent kits from Distillery and Crusaders they continued to compete at Grosvenor. Out of fourteen league games at Grosvenor Park, however, they were only victorious over Linfield on one occasion.

Since Belfast Celtic folded in 1949, the intensity of the Big Two rivalry has increased due to the fact that Glentoran has been the only club that has generated a support base similar in size to Linfield's, and because a number of Belfast Celtic fans started to support Glentoran due to the dissolution of their club. In the 1985 Irish Cup final at the Oval, Glentoran supporters released a cockerel (Glentoran's club emblem), and a pig that had been painted blue onto the pitch to insult fans of Linfield. In 2005, Linfield fans broke through a gate in perimeter fencing onto the pitch of The Oval and threw missiles at Glentoran fans in the main stand. The BBC and Ulster Television were ordered to give police footage they had filmed of the game after nine fans were charged with the violence. Nine police officers and two Glentoran fans were injured in the violence.

Both sides share rivalries with North Belfast clubs Cliftonville and Crusaders. The two however are less successful than the Big Two and see each other as their main rivals, contesting the North Belfast derby. They also both traditionally shared a rivalry with Lisburn Distillery, but since Distillery's relocation from Grosvenor Park to Lisburn, and their downturn in on-pitch fortunes, the rivalry has ebbed.

== Trophy dominance ==
Linfield and Glentoran have been the two most successful clubs in Northern Irish football to date, regularly being the two main contenders for the major domestic honours. They have won more league titles, Irish Cups, and League Cups than any other clubs. Linfield hold the record for the most League titles (56), Irish Cups (43), and League Cups (10). In comparison, Glentoran have won 23 league titles, 23 Irish Cups, and seven League Cups. Almost half (47.1%) of the 140 Irish Cup competitions to date have been won by one of the two clubs, with at least one of the clubs reaching the final on 91 occasions (65% of all finals), winning the cup a combined 66 times. Of those 91 finals, the two clubs have met in fifteen of them – making it the most common final. Linfield have won eight of the head-to-head final meetings compared to Glentoran's seven wins, with the most recent final meeting between the two clubs occurring in the 2006 final, when Linfield won 2–1 to lift the Cup for the 37th time. Almost two-thirds (64.7%) of all Irish League titles have been won by one of the Big Two. Of the 119 completed league seasons, the title has been won by either club on 77 occasions. The duo also comprise two of the three clubs that have appeared in every season of the Irish League since its inception in 1890; the other club being Cliftonville.

Linfield's financial advantage over the other clubs must be acknowledged when comparing their relative success. In 1912, seven of the eight league clubs resigned from the IFA due to Linfield receiving higher fees than other clubs for hosting international games. This schism, while quickly mended, led to the formation of the Gold Cup as an alternative Irish Cup from which the seven clubs were excluded. In 1984, the IFA signed a 104-year agreement with Linfield to host internationals at Windsor Park, with only Glentoran objecting to the deal at the time. The contract meant that Linfield were entitled to a payment of 15% of all revenues generated from home internationals. This became financially lucrative for Linfield after the IFA signed a £10 million deal with Sky to televise internationals. Linfield maintained ownership of the stadium, and were required to maintain the stadium to international standard, however, over the years, the stadium had fallen into disrepair. This necessitated redevelopment, with the Northern Ireland government funding the majority of the £36 million project to rebuild the stadium. The IFA then took over ownership of the stadium, while Linfield retained ownership of the land. In 2012, Linfield and the IFA agreed a new contract for the use of Windsor Park. Linfield would receive an annual payment as rent for the land, but would no longer receive 15% of the ticket sales, TV rights, and commercial rights from international matches as they did under the old agreement. The 51-year agreement took effect from May 2014, with Linfield initially receiving £200,000 per year - subject to review (being adjusted for inflation etc.) every four years. This rose by 7% to £214,000 in 2018, and is due to increase again in 2022. The contract will expire in 2065.

=== Statistics ===
As of the end of the 2024–25 season

Winner	League	Irish Cup	League Cup	County Antrim Shield	Total
Linfield	57	44	12	43	156
Glentoran	23	23	7	27	80
Total	80	67	19	70	236
Competitions	123	144	37	136	440
Big Two win %	67.5%	46.5%	51.4%	51.5%	54.3%

== Head-to-head record ==
=== Overall ===
Statistics for which reliable sources have been found apply to competitive games in all competitions (wartime league results not included). Wins include those after extra time and/or penalty shoot-outs.

As of 5 April 2025

Result	League	Irish Cup	League Cup	County Antrim Shield	Europa League play-offs	Setanta Cup	Gold Cup	Ulster Cup	City Cup	Floodlit Cup	Belfast Charity Cup	North-South Cup	Charity Shield	Alhambra Cup	Mercer Cup	Top Four Cup	Total
Linfield win	132	29	10	30	0	5	27	14	38	1	15	1	1	1	0	3	307
Glentoran win	82	19	7	18	1	1	16	6	35	2	5	0	0	0	1	0	193
Draw	81	15	2	7	0	2	7	7	31	0	0	1	0	0	0	1	154
Total	295	63	19	55	1	8	50	27	104	3	20	2	1	1	1	4	654

=== League only ===
Statistics apply to league matches only (wartime results not included)

As of end of 5 April 2025

Result	The Oval	Windsor Park	Balmoral	Ulsterville	Grosvenor Park	Westbourne	Solitude	Total
Linfield wins	54	64	3	4	2	2	2	131
Glentoran wins	51	28	2	1	0	0	0	82
Draws	38	39	4	0	0	0	0	81
Total	143	131	9	5	2	2	2	294

== Results ==
=== League results ===
All time results taken from Irish Football Club Project, British Newspaper Archive and various other sources. Attendance figures from nifootballleague.com.

		Glentoran vs Linfield				Linfield vs Glentoran			
Season	Division	Date	Venue	Score	Attendance	Date	Venue	Score	Attendance
1890–91	Irish League	18 October 1890	Westbourne	0 – 7		21 March 1891	Ulsterville	6 – 0	
1891–92	Irish League	3 October 1891	Westbourne	1 – 7		23 April 1892	Ulsterville	8 – 0	
1892–93	Irish League	8 October 1892	The Oval	1 – 2		3 September 1892	Ulsterville	5 – 0	
1893–94	Irish League	21 October 1893	The Oval	1 – 3		16 September 1893	Ulsterville	0 – 1	
1894–95	Irish League	15 September 1894	The Oval	2 – 2		6 October 1894	Ulsterville	3 – 0	
1895–96	Irish League	19 October 1895	The Oval	2 – 3		5 October 1895	The Oval^{1}	2 – 2	
1896–97	Irish League	3 October 1896	The Oval	1 – 0		21 November 1896	Balmoral	2 – 2	
1897–98	Irish League	2 October 1897	The Oval	2 – 4		13 November 1897	Balmoral	2 – 1	
1898–99	Irish League	1 October 1898	The Oval	1 – 2		19 November 1898	Balmoral	0 – 1	
1899–00	Irish League	18 November 1899	The Oval	4 – 4		23 September 1899	Balmoral	2 – 0	
1900–01	Irish League	3 November 1900	The Oval	0 – 0		29 September 1900	Balmoral	1 – 3	
1901–02	Irish League	28 October 1901	The Oval	0 – 2		9 September 1901	Balmoral	5 – 1	
1902–03	Irish League	18 October 1902	The Oval	0 – 1		21 February 1903	Balmoral	1 – 1	
1903–04	Irish League	12 September 1903	The Oval	1 – 1		1 March 1904	Balmoral	0 – 0	
1904–05	Irish League	10 December 1904	The Oval	1 – 0		10 September 1904	Balmoral	2 – 2	
1905–06	Irish League	11 November 1905	The Oval	1 – 2		2 September 1905	Windsor Park	1 – 0	
1906–07	Irish League	1 September 1906	The Oval	0 – 2		30 April 1907	Windsor Park	1 – 1	
1907–08	Irish League	8 February 1908	The Oval	2 – 2		18 January 1908	Windsor Park	2 – 3	
1908–09	Irish League	25 December 1908	The Oval	2 – 2		26 September 1908	Windsor Park	4 – 1	
1909–10	Irish League	25 December 1909	The Oval	4 – 0		25 September 1909	Windsor Park	2 – 1	
1910–11	Irish League	24 September 1910	The Oval	3 – 0	10,000	26 November 1910	Windsor Park	2 – 2	
1910–11	Irish League Test Match^{2}					23 January 1911	Solitude	3 – 2	
1911–12	Irish League	11 November 1911	The Oval	1 – 0		16 September 1911	Windsor Park	2 – 1	
1912–13	Irish League	14 December 1912	The Oval	4 – 2	12,000	12 October 1912	Windsor Park	0 – 0	
1913–14	Irish League	29 November 1913	The Oval	2 – 2		27 September 1913	Windsor Park	4 – 2	
1914–15	Irish League	12 December 1914	The Oval	1 – 1		17 October 1914	Windsor Park	3 – 0	
1915–16	Belfast & District League	6 November 1915	The Oval	0 – 0		25 September 1915	Windsor Park	0 – 0	
1916–17	Belfast & District League	11 November 1916	The Oval	4 – 0		30 September 1916	Windsor Park	2 – 2	
1917–18	Belfast & District League	6 October 1917	The Oval	0 – 0		17 November 1917	Windsor Park	2 – 0	13,000
1918–19	Belfast & District League	7 September 1918	The Oval	1 – 0		19 October 1918	Windsor Park	0 – 2	
1919–20	Irish League	31 August 1919	The Oval	2 – 0		18 October 1919	Windsor Park	1 – 0	
1920–21	Irish League	11 December 1920	The Oval	1 – 0		15 January 1921	Windsor Park	2 – 3	
1921–22	Irish League	5 November 1921	The Oval	0 – 0		17 September 1921	Windsor Park	1 – 0	
1922–23	Irish League	9 September 1922	The Oval	1 – 2		14 October 1922	Windsor Park	1 – 1	
1923–24	Irish League	17 November 1923	The Oval	2 – 1		25 August 1923	Windsor Park	1 – 2	
1924–25	Irish League	24 January 1925	The Oval	4 – 0		1 November 1924	Windsor Park	2 – 1	
1925–26	Irish League	23 January 1926	The Oval	3 – 2		31 October 1925	Windsor Park	0 – 1	
1926–27	Irish League	18 December 1926	The Oval	3 – 1		11 September 1926	Windsor Park	0 – 1	
1927–28	Irish League	3 December 1927	The Oval	1 – 5		20 August 1927	Windsor Park	6 – 1	
1928–29	Irish League	8 September 1928	The Oval	2 – 1		22 December 1928	Windsor Park	4 – 3	
1929–30	Irish League	7 September 1929	The Oval	3 – 3		21 December 1929	Windsor Park	3 – 1	
1930–31	Irish League	3 January 1931	The Oval	1 – 1		11 October 1930	Windsor Park	0 – 2	
1931–32	Irish League	21 November 1931	The Oval	0 – 1		20 August 1931	Windsor Park	4 – 3	
1932–33	Irish League	15 October 1932	The Oval	1 – 5		27 December 1932	Windsor Park	4 – 2	
1933–34	Irish League	26 December 1933	The Oval	0 – 3		23 September 1933	Windsor Park	0 – 1	
1934–35	Irish League	25 November 1934	The Oval	2 – 2		22 August 1934	Windsor Park	1 – 0	
1935–36	Irish League	21 August 1935	The Oval	1 – 2		23 November 1935	Windsor Park	0 – 1	
1936–37	Irish League	16 January 1937	The Oval	2 – 3		10 October 1936	Windsor Park	5 – 1	
1937–38	Irish League	25 December 1937	The Oval	2 – 0		18 September 1937	Windsor Park	5 – 2	
1938–39	Irish League	27 August 1938	The Oval	3 – 2		3 December 1938	Windsor Park	2 – 1	
1939–40	Irish League	16 March 1940	The Oval	3 – 2		23 December 1939	Windsor Park	1 – 2	
1940–41	Northern Regional League	26 December 1940	The Oval	1 – 2		16 November 1940	Windsor Park	1 – 4	
1940–41	Northern Regional League	17 May 1941	The Oval	3 – 1		15 February 1941	Windsor Park	3 – 3	
1941–42	Northern Regional League	13 December 1941	Grosvenor Park	0 – 3		8 November 1941	Windsor Park	3 – 7	
1941–42	Northern Regional League	11 April 1942	Grosvenor Park	3 – 4		3 January 1942	Windsor Park	3 – 3	
1942–43	Northern Regional League	14 November 1942	Grosvenor Park	2 – 1		19 December 1942	Windsor Park	4 – 3	
1942–43	Northern Regional League	30 January 1943	Grosvenor Park	1 – 3		20 March 1943	Windsor Park	5 – 3	
1943–44	Northern Regional League	1 January 1944	Grosvenor Park	2 – 2		4 December 1943	Windsor Park	4 – 1	
1943–44	Northern Regional League	11 April 1944	Grosvenor Park	1 – 3		4 March 1944	Windsor Park	5 – 4	
1944–45	Northern Regional League	13 January 1945	Grosvenor Park	1 – 2		31 March 1945	Windsor Park	3 – 3	
1944–45	Northern Regional League	18 November 1944	Grosvenor Park	1 – 5		23 December 1944	Windsor Park	9 – 2	
1945–46	Northern Regional League	9 February 1946	Grosvenor Park	0 – 3		6 April 1946	Windsor Park	5 – 0	
1945–46	Northern Regional League	24 November 1945	Grosvenor Park	1 – 7		25 December 1945	Windsor Park	4 – 2	
1946–47	Northern Regional League	11 January 1947	Grosvenor Park	1 – 2		7 December 1946	Windsor Park	4 – 2	
1946–47	Northern Regional League	12 April 1947	Grosvenor Park	2 – 4		1 March 1947	Windsor Park	2 – 3	
1947–48	Irish League	17 January 1948	Grosvenor Park	0 – 2		15 November 1947	Windsor Park	1 – 1	
1948–49	Irish League	19 March 1949	Grosvenor Park	1 – 4		25 December 1948	Windsor Park	2 – 0	
1949–50	Irish League	7 January 1950	The Oval	2 – 3		11 April 1950	Windsor Park	1 – 1	
1949–50	Irish League Test Match^{2}					10 May 1950	Solitude	2 – 0	
1950–51	Irish League	17 March 1951	The Oval	1 – 1		25 December 1950	Windsor Park	2 – 1	
1951–52	Irish League	25 December 1951	The Oval	4 – 3		22 March 1952	Windsor Park	1 – 0	
1952–53	Irish League	14 March 1953	The Oval	3 – 1		25 December 1952	Windsor Park	1 – 1	
1953–54	Irish League	25 December 1953	The Oval	0 – 2		30 January 1954	Windsor Park	3 – 2	
1954–55	Irish League	19 March 1955	The Oval	1 – 2		25 December 1954	Windsor Park	3 – 0	
1955–56	Irish League	26 December 1955	The Oval	1 – 1		31 March 1956	Windsor Park	1 – 0	
1956–57	Irish League	13 October 1956	The Oval	1 – 3		31 December 1956	Windsor Park	2 – 2	
1957–58	Irish League	25 December 1957	The Oval	0 – 2		15 March 1958	Windsor Park	3 – 1	
1958–59	Irish League	11 April 1959	The Oval	2 – 1		25 December 1958	Windsor Park	4 – 2	
1959–60	Irish League	25 December 1959	The Oval	7 – 3		19 March 1960	Windsor Park	3 – 2	
1960–61	Irish League	24 December 1960	The Oval	0 – 1		4 February 1961	Windsor Park	3 – 2	
1961–62	Irish League	17 February 1962	The Oval	1 – 1		20 January 1962	Windsor Park	3 – 1	
1962–63	Irish League	12 January 1963	The Oval	1 – 1		13 April 1963	Windsor Park	1 – 1	
1963–64	Irish League	21 December 1963	The Oval	3 – 2		4 April 1964	Windsor Park	1 – 8	
1964–65	Irish League	13 March 1965	The Oval	1 – 1		9 January 1965	Windsor Park	4 – 1	
1965–66	Irish League	6 November 1965	The Oval	2 – 0		15 January 1966	Windsor Park	1 – 2	
1966–67	Irish League	4 February 1967	The Oval	2 – 2		26 November 1966	Windsor Park	1 – 1	
1967–68	Irish League	23 September 1967	The Oval	2 – 2		16 December 1967	Windsor Park	3 – 1	
1968–69	Irish League	11 January 1969	The Oval	2 – 1		9 November 1968	Windsor Park	1 – 3	
1969–70	Irish League	10 January 1970	The Oval	2 – 2		1 November 1969	Windsor Park	0 – 2	
1970–71	Irish League]	1 May 1971	The Oval	0 – 3		20 February 1971	Windsor Park	1 – 1	
1971–72	Irish League	3 April 1972	The Oval	4 – 0		13 November 1971	Windsor Park	2 – 2	
1972–73	Irish League	25 November 1972	The Oval	0 – 2		11 April 1973	Windsor Park	0 – 1	
1973–74	Irish League	25 December 1973	The Oval	3 – 2		4 April 1974	Windsor Park	5 – 1	
1974–75	Irish League	15 March 1975	The Oval	1 – 0		26 December 1974	Windsor Park	4 – 1	
1975–76	Irish League	26 December 1975	The Oval	2 – 1		20 March 1976	Windsor Park	1 – 2	
1976–77	Irish League	March 1977	The Oval	2 – 0		25 December 1976	Windsor Park	3 – 0	
1977–78	Irish League	26 December 1977	The Oval	2 – 3		25 March 1978	Windsor Park	1 – 2	
1978–79	Irish League	14 April 1979	The Oval	1 – 1		16 January 1979	Windsor Park	2 – 1	
1979–80	Irish League	12 April 1980	The Oval	1 – 2		12 January 1980	Windsor Park	5 – 0	
1980–81	Irish League	10 January 1981	The Oval	2 – 1		18 April 1981	Windsor Park	1 – 1	
1981–82	Irish League	6 February 1982	The Oval	1 – 2		21 November 1981	Windsor Park	1 – 2	
1982–83	Irish League	27 November 1982	The Oval	3 – 0		5 February 1983	Windsor Park	2 – 2	
1983–84	Irish League	3 March 1984	The Oval	4 – 1		26 November 1983	Windsor Park	3 – 0	
1984–85	Irish League	24 November 1984	The Oval	2 – 3		9 March 1985	Windsor Park	3 – 1	
1985–86	Irish League	8 March 1986	The Oval	2 – 3		21 January 1986	Windsor Park	2 – 1	
1986–87	Irish League	22 November 1986	The Oval	3 – 1		29 November 1986	Windsor Park	1 – 0	
1987–88	Irish League	16 April 1988	The Oval	0 – 1		2 February 1988	Windsor Park	0 – 2	
1988–89	Irish League	7 January 1989	The Oval	2 – 3		22 April 1989	Windsor Park	1 – 2	
1989–90	Irish League	26 December 1989	The Oval	3 – 2		17 April 1990	Windsor Park	1 – 3	
1990–91	Irish League	10 April 1991	The Oval	1 – 0		26 December 1990	Windsor Park	1 – 1	
1991–92	Irish League	26 December 1991	The Oval	3 – 3		21 April 1992	Windsor Park	0 – 0	
1992–93	Irish League	17 April 1993	The Oval	1 – 2		26 December 1992	Windsor Park	2 – 0	
1993–94	Irish League	27 December 1993	The Oval	0 – 2		30 April 1994	Windsor Park	2 – 0	
1994–95	Irish League	29 April 1995	The Oval	2 – 2		26 December 1994	Windsor Park	1 – 1	
1995–96	Irish League	26 December 1995	The Oval	0 – 3		4 November 1995	Windsor Park	0 – 4	
1995–96	Irish League	20 April 1996	The Oval	3 – 0		17 February 1996	Windsor Park	2 – 0	
1996–97	Irish League	9 November 1996	The Oval	1 – 1		26 December 1996	Windsor Park	0 – 0	
1996–97	Irish League	15 February 1997	The Oval	0 – 2		19 April 1997	Windsor Park	0 – 0	
1997–98	Irish League	30 August 1997	The Oval	0 – 3		1 November 1997	Windsor Park	3 – 0	
1997–98	Irish League	26 December 1997	The Oval	1 – 1		7 March 1998	Windsor Park	2 – 0	
1998–99	Irish League	5 December 1998	The Oval	1 – 2		3 October 1998	Windsor Park	1 – 1	
1998–99	Irish League	6 March 1999	The Oval	0 – 1		26 December 1998	Windsor Park	1 – 1	
1999–00	Irish League	31 August 1999	The Oval	1 – 0		30 October 1999	Windsor Park	2 – 0	
1999–00	Irish League	26 December 1999	The Oval	1 – 1		18 March 2000	Windsor Park	1 – 2	
2000–01	Irish League	28 October 2000	The Oval	0 – 1		12 September 2000	Windsor Park	0 – 0	
2000–01	Irish League	10 May 2001	The Oval	2 – 0		26 December 2000	Windsor Park	2 – 0	
2001–02	Irish League	1 September 2001	The Oval	1 – 0		17 November 2001	Windsor Park	0 – 0	
2001–02	Irish League	26 December 2001	The Oval	3 – 3		16 March 2002	Windsor Park	2 – 2	
2002–03	Irish League	12 October 2002	The Oval	3 – 2		26 December 2002	Windsor Park	1 – 1	
2002–03	Irish League	22 January 2003	The Oval	0 – 0		29 April 2003	Windsor Park	1 – 1	
2003–04	Irish Premier League	26 December 2003	The Oval	1 – 3		24 March 2004	Windsor Park	2 – 1	
2004–05	Irish Premier League	22 April 2005	The Oval	3 – 2		26 December 2004	Windsor Park	1 – 1	
2005–06	Irish Premier League	26 December 2005	The Oval	1 – 4		15 April 2006	Windsor Park	0 – 0	
2006–07	Irish Premier League	14 April 2007	The Oval	1 – 2		26 December 2007	Windsor Park	1 – 1	
2007–08	Irish Premier League	26 December 2007	The Oval	1 – 0		12 April 2008	Windsor Park	0 – 0	
2008–09	IFA Premiership	4 March 2009	The Oval	2 – 0	6,108	26 December 2008	Windsor Park	3 – 0	9,500
2008–09	IFA Premiership	10 April 2009	The Oval	1 – 1		16 March 2009	Windsor Park	1 – 0	4,264
2009–10	IFA Premiership	18 August 2009	The Oval	2 – 2	6,105	17 October 2009	Windsor Park	2 – 1	4,604
2009–10	IFA Premiership	26 January 2010	The Oval	2 – 2		6 April 2010	Windsor Park	3 – 1	4,385
2010–11	IFA Premiership	27 September 2010	The Oval	0 – 0	3,425	18 November 2010	Windsor Park	2 – 1	5,177
2010–11	IFA Premiership	16 April 2011	The Oval	1 – 2		19 April 2011	Windsor Park	3 – 2	
2011–12	IFA Premiership	9 November 2011	The Oval	2 – 0	2,428	27 August 2011	Windsor Park	0 – 1	3,526
2011–12	IFA Premiership	26 December 2011	The Oval	1 – 0	5,300	28 April 2012	Windsor Park	0 – 2	2,167
2012–13	IFA Premiership	1 September 2012	The Oval	1 – 1	2,991	26 December 2012	Windsor Park	2 – 1	5,458
2012–13	IFA Premiership	16 February 2013	The Oval	1 – 1		2 April 2013	Windsor Park	1 – 0	1,801
2013–14	NIFL Premiership	26 December 2013	The Oval	1 – 2	5,389	30 August 2013	Windsor Park	0 – 0	2,736
2013–14	NIFL Premiership	21 February 2014	The Oval	0 – 1	2,016	22 April 2014	Windsor Park	0 – 2	2,467
2014–15	NIFL Premiership	13 August 2014	The Oval	2 – 3	4,316	15 November 2014	Windsor Park	2 – 2	3,670
2014–15	NIFL Premiership	7 April 2015	The Oval	1 – 2	3,350	26 December 2014	Windsor Park	2 – 1	6,538
2015–16	NIFL Premiership	26 December 2015	The Oval	1 – 2	6,000	10 October 2015	Windsor Park	1 – 1	4,057
2015–16	NIFL Premiership	19 April 2016	The Oval	0 – 4	2,350	12 March 2016	Windsor Park	3 – 0	4,175
2016–17	NIFL Premiership	1 October 2016	The Oval	1 – 2	3,754	26 December 2016	Windsor Park	1 – 1	7,504
2016–17	NIFL Premiership	25 February 2017	The Oval	0 – 1	3,045	26 December 2016	Windsor Park	1 – 1	7,504
2017–18	NIFL Premiership	26 December 2017	The Oval	2 – 1	6,054	9 September 2017	Windsor Park	1 – 0	4,179
2017–18	NIFL Premiership	26 December 2017	The Oval	2 – 1	6,054	17 March 2018	Windsor Park	1 – 1	2,607
2018–19	NIFL Premiership	8 October 2018	The Oval	0 – 1	4,425	26 December 2018	Windsor Park	4 – 0	6,944
2018–19	NIFL Premiership	8 October 2018	The Oval	0 – 1	4,425	28 January 2019	Windsor Park	4 – 2	2,554
2019–20	NIFL Premiership	26 December 2019	The Oval	3 – 0	6,000	14 September 2019	Windsor Park	1 – 0	4,810
2020–21	NIFL Premiership	2 March 2021	The Oval	3 – 1	0	24 November 2020	Windsor Park	3 – 3	526
2020–21	NIFL Premiership	1 May 2021	The Oval	0 – 0	0	23 February 2021	Windsor Park	0 – 1	0
2021–22	NIFL Premiership	28 September 2021	The Oval	0 – 3	4,194	27 December 2021	Windsor Park	1 – 1	8,007
2021–22	NIFL Premiership	11 February 2022	The Oval	1 – 0	6,000	15 April 2022	Windsor Park	1 – 1	6,809
2022–23	NIFL Premiership	26 December 2022	The Oval	1 – 2	6,154	14 October 2022	Windsor Park	0 – 3	7,134
2022–23	NIFL Premiership	14 February 2023	The Oval	3 – 0	5,437	12 April 2023	Windsor Park	1 – 1	4,601
2023–24	NIFL Premiership	1 December 2023	The Oval	4 – 0	3,885	6 October 2023	Windsor Park	2 – 0	7,772
2023–24	NIFL Premiership	6 April 2024	The Oval	0 – 0	2,610	26 December 2023	Windsor Park	2 – 0	9,047
2024–25	NIFL Premiership	22 November 2024	The Oval	1 – 0	4,613	4 October 2024	Windsor Park	1 – 3	5,401
2024–25	NIFL Premiership	26 December 2024	The Oval	0 – 0	5,915	5 April 2025	Windsor Park	2 – 1	

- ^{1} In 1895-96, Linfield played all their matches away from home after their Ulsterville ground was purchased for development.
- ^{2} This match was played to determine the league winner after both teams finished level on points in the table.

=== Other results ===
Season	Date	Competition	Round	Stadium	Home team	Result	Away team	Attendance
1891–92	21 November 1891	Irish Cup	Quarter-final	Ulsterville	Linfield	6 – 0	Glentoran	
1891–92	23 April 1892	Belfast Charity Cup	Quarter-final	Ulsterville	Linfield	4 – 0	Glentoran	
1892–93	5 November 1892	Irish Cup	First round	Ulsterville	Linfield	6 – 1	Glentoran	
1892–93	22 April 1893	Belfast Charity Cup	Semi-final	Ulster Cricket Ground	Linfield	1 – 0	Glentoran	
1893–94	18 November 1893	Irish Cup	First round	Ulsterville	Linfield	4 – 0	Glentoran	
1893–94	28 April 1894	Belfast Charity Cup	Final	Solitude	Linfield	2 – 0	Glentoran	5,000
1894–95	10 November 1894	City Cup	Group stage	The Oval	Glentoran	4 – 3	Linfield	
1894–95	23 February 1895	City Cup	Group stage	Ulsterville	Linfield	5 – 2	Glentoran	
1895–96	2 November 1895	City Cup	Group stage	The Oval	Glentoran	1 – 2	Linfield	
1895–96	9 May 1896	City Cup	Group stage	The Oval	Glentoran	0 – 2	Linfield	
1896–97	2 January 1897	City Cup	Group stage	The Oval	Glentoran	2 – 0	Linfield	
1896–97	13 February 1897	County Antrim Shield	Semi-final	Grosvenor Park	Linfield	2 – 0	Glentoran	
1896–97	15 May 1897	City Cup	Group stage	The Oval	Glentoran	2 – 0	Linfield	
1897–98	1 January 1898	City Cup	Group stage	The Oval	Glentoran	2 – 1	Linfield	
1897–98	15 April 1898	Belfast Charity Cup	Semi-final	Solitude	Glentoran	2 – 1	Linfield	
1897–98	7 May 1898	City Cup	Group stage	Balmoral	Linfield	0 – 1	Glentoran	
1898–99	8 December 1898	City Cup	Group stage	The Oval	Glentoran	1 – 4	Linfield	
1898–99	7 January 1899	County Antrim Shield	First round	The Oval	Glentoran	0 – 3	Linfield	
1898–99	18 March 1899	Irish Cup	Final	Solitude	Linfield	1 – 0^{1}	Glentoran	7,000
1898–99	6 May 1899	City Cup	Group stage	Balmoral	Linfield	0 – 1	Glentoran	
1899–1900	16 December 1899	City Cup	Group stage	Balmoral	Linfield	1 – 1	Glentoran	500
1899–1900	10 February 1900	County Antrim Shield	Semi-final	Solitude	Glentoran	1 – 1	Linfield	2,000
1899–1900	10 March 1900	County Antrim Shield	Semi-final replay	Solitude	Linfield	2 – 0	Glentoran	2,000
1899–1900	7 April 1900	City Cup	Group stage	The Oval	Glentoran	0 – 1	Linfield	
1900–01	25 December 1900	City Cup	Group stage	Balmoral	Linfield	1 – 1	Glentoran	
1900–01	8 April 1901	City Cup	Group stage	The Oval	Glentoran	1 – 1	Linfield	
1901–02	31 March 1901	City Cup	Group stage	Balmoral	Linfield	1 – 1	Glentoran	
1901–02	26 April 1902	Belfast Charity Cup	Final	Solitude	Glentoran	2 – 0	Linfield	
1901–02	24 May 1902	City Cup	Group stage	Balmoral	Linfield	0 – 0	Glentoran	
1902–03	8 November 1902	Irish Cup	Quarter-final	The Oval	Glentoran	1 – 2	Linfield	
1902–03	13 December 1902	City Cup	Group stage	Balmoral	Linfield	1 – 1	Glentoran	
1902–03	9 May 1903	City Cup	Final	Grosvenor Park	Linfield	2 – 0	Glentoran	
1902–03	16 May 1903	Belfast Charity Cup	Final	Solitude	Linfield	2 – 0	Glentoran	
1903–04	7 November 1903	Irish Cup	First round	Balmoral	Linfield	3 – 0	Glentoran	
1903–04	9 January 1904	City Cup	Group stage	The Oval	Glentoran	0 – 2	Linfield	5,000
1903–04	16 April 1904	City Cup	Group stage	Balmoral	Linfield	2 – 0	Glentoran	3,000
1903–04	23 April 1904	Belfast Charity Cup	Semi-final	Grosvenor Park	Glentoran	1 – 0	Linfield	2,500
1904–05	31 December 1904	City Cup	Group stage	Balmoral	Linfield	2 – 0	Glentoran	
1904–05	22 April 1905	City Cup	Group stage	The Oval	Glentoran	1 – 0	Linfield	2,000
1904–05	6 May 1905	Belfast Charity Cup	Final	Solitude	Linfield	2 – 0	Glentoran	
1905–06	16 December 1905	City Cup	Group stage	The Oval	Glentoran	4 – 1	Linfield	3,000
1905–06	24 March 1906	City Cup	Group stage	Windsor Park	Linfield	1 – 1	Glentoran	
1906–07	30 March 1907	County Antrim Shield	Final	Solitude	Linfield	2 – 0	Glentoran	
1906–07	1 April 1907	City Cup	Group stage	The Oval	Glentoran	3 – 1	Linfield	3,000
1906–07	27 April 1907	Belfast Charity Cup	Final	Solitude	Glentoran	2 – 0	Linfield	
1906–07	30 April 1907	City Cup	Group stage	Windsor Park	Linfield	0 – 2	Glentoran	
1907–08	4 January 1908	City Cup	Group stage	The Oval	Glentoran	5 – 0	Linfield	
1907–08	11 April 1908	Belfast Charity Cup	Semi-final	Solitude	Linfield	2 – 1	Glentoran	6,000
1907–08	21 April 1908	City Cup	Group stage	Windsor Park	Linfield	2 – 1	Glentoran	8,000
1908–09	5 December 1908	City Cup	Group stage	The Oval	Glentoran	2 – 0	Linfield	3,000
1908–09	30 January 1909	County Antrim Shield	First round	Windsor Park	Linfield	0 – 2	Glentoran	5,000
1908–09	12 April 1909	City Cup	Group stage	Windsor Park	Linfield	1 – 2	Glentoran	
1909–10	6 November 1909	City Cup	Group stage	Windsor Park	Linfield	2 – 1	Glentoran	
1909–10	5 February 1910	Irish Cup	Quarter-final	Windsor Park	Linfield	2 – 2	Glentoran	8,000
1909–10	9 February 1910	Irish Cup	Quarter-final replay	The Oval	Glentoran	2 – 1	Linfield	
1909–10	28 March 1910	City Cup	Group stage	The Oval	Glentoran	1 – 1	Linfield	5,000
1910–11	26 December 1910	City Cup	Group stage	The Oval	Glentoran	5 – 1	Linfield	
1910–11	25 February 1911	County Antrim Shield	First round	The Oval	Glentoran	3 – 1	Linfield	10,000
1910–11	1 April 1911	City Cup	Group stage	Windsor Park	Linfield	1 – 1	Glentoran	
1911–12	13 January 1912	City Cup	Group stage	The Oval	Glentoran	1 – 0	Linfield	
1911–12	30 April 1912	City Cup	Group stage	The Oval	Glentoran	2 – 0	Linfield^{2}	
1912–13	15 January 1913	City Cup	Group stage	The Oval	Glentoran	4 – 3	Linfield	2,500
1912–13	15 March 1913	City Cup	Group stage	Windsor Park	Linfield	1 – 0	Glentoran	3,000
1912–13	29 March 1913	Irish Cup	Final	Celtic Park	Linfield	2 – 0	Glentoran	20,000
1913–14	11 October 1913	City Cup	Group stage	The Oval	Glentoran	2 – 2	Linfield	
1913–14	14 February 1914	City Cup	Group stage	Windsor Park	Linfield	4 – 1	Glentoran	
1913–14	21 March 1914	County Antrim Shield	Final	Grosvenor Park	Linfield	3 – 2	Glentoran	20,000
1913–14	28 March 1914	Irish Cup	Final	Grosvenor Park	Glentoran	3 – 1	Linfield	20,000
1913–14	2 May 1914	Belfast Charity Cup	Final	Solitude	Linfield	1 – 0	Glentoran	
1913–14	16 May 1914	City Cup	Playoff	Solitude	Glentoran	2 – 0	Linfield	
1914–15	13 January 1915	County Antrim Shield	First round	The Oval	Glentoran	2 – 1	Linfield	
1914–15	3 April 1915	City Cup	Group stage	The Oval	Glentoran	1 – 3	Linfield	
1914–15	12 May 1915	City Cup	Group stage	Windsor Park	Linfield	0 – 0	Glentoran	7,000
1915–16	25 September 1915	Belfast City Cup	Group stage	Windsor Park	Linfield	0 – 0	Glentoran	
1915–16	11 December 1915	Belfast City Cup	Group stage	The Oval	Glentoran	3 – 0	Linfield	
1915–16	25 March 1916	Irish Cup	Final	Celtic Park	Linfield	1 – 1	Glentoran	
1915–16	1 April 1916	Irish Cup	Final replay	Grosvenor Park	Linfield	1 – 0	Glentoran	
1915–16	15 April 1916	Belfast Charity Cup	Semi-final	Grosvenor Park	Linfield	2 – 0	Glentoran	
1915–16	13 May 1916	Gold Cup	Group stage	Grosvenor Park	Glentoran	2 – 1	Linfield	
1916–17	30 December 1916	Belfast City Cup	Group stage	Windsor Park	Linfield	0 – 2	Glentoran	
1916–17	3 March 1917	County Antrim Shield	Final	Celtic Park	Linfield	3 – 0	Glentoran	
1916–17	9 April 1917	Gold Cup	Group stage	Windsor Park	Linfield	1 – 0^{3}	Glentoran	
1916–17	5 May 1917	Belfast Charity Cup	Final	Solitude	Linfield	1 – 0	Glentoran	
1916–17	11 May 1917	Belfast City Cup	Group stage	The Oval	Glentoran	6 – 1	Linfield	
1917–18	22 December 1917	Belfast City Cup	Group stage	Windsor Park	Linfield	1 – 0	Glentoran	
1917–18	2 March 1918	Belfast City Cup	Group stage	Windsor Park	Linfield	0 – 1	Glentoran	
1917–18	20 April 1918	County Antrim Shield	Final	Grosvenor Park	Glentoran	2 – 0	Linfield	
1917–18	6 May 1918	Belfast Charity Cup	Final	Solitude	Linfield	1 – 0	Glentoran	
1917–18	11 May 1918	Gold Cup	Group stage	The Oval	Glentoran	0 – 0	Linfield	10,000
1918–19	7 December 1918	Belfast City Cup	Group stage	Windsor Park	Linfield	1 – 0	Glentoran	
1918–19	28 December 1918	Belfast City Cup	Group stage	The Oval	Glentoran	2 – 1	Linfield	
1918–19	22 February 1919	Gold Cup	Group stage	Windsor Park	Linfield	2 – 1	Glentoran	
1918–19	29 March 1919	Irish Cup	Final	Celtic Park	Linfield	1 – 1	Glentoran	18,000
1918–19	5 April 1919	Irish Cup	Final replay	Grosvenor Park	Linfield	0 – 0	Glentoran	
1918–19	7 April 1919	Irish Cup	Final replay	Solitude	Linfield	2 – 1	Glentoran	
1918–19	3 May 1919	Belfast Charity Cup	Final	Solitude	Linfield	1 – 0	Glentoran	9,193
1919–20	25 December 1919	City Cup	Group stage	The Oval	Glentoran	0 – 0	Linfield	
1919–20	3 April 1920	City Cup	Group stage	Windsor Park	Linfield	2 – 1	Glentoran	
1919–20	8 May 1920	Gold Cup	Semi-final	Solitude	Glentoran	3 – 0	Linfield	
1920–21	4 September 1920	Gold Cup	Group stage	Windsor Park	Linfield	0 – 1	Glentoran	
1920–21	9 October 1920	Gold Cup	Group stage	The Oval	Glentoran	0 – 1	Linfield	
1920–21	22 January 1921	County Antrim Shield	Semi-final	Solitude	Glentoran	0 – 0	Linfield	
1920–21	3 February 1921	County Antrim Shield	Semi-final replay	Solitude	Glentoran	1 – 0	Linfield	
1920–21	31 March 1921	City Cup	Group stage	Windsor Park	Linfield	0 – 0	Glentoran	
1920–21	2 April 1921	City Cup	Group stage	The Oval	Glentoran	3 – 0	Linfield	
1921–22	27 August 1921	Alhambra Cup	Semi-final	Solitude	Linfield	1 – 0	Glentoran	
1921–22	26 November 1921	City Cup	Group stage	Windsor Park	Linfield	1 – 1	Glentoran	
1921–22	26 December 1921	City Cup	Group stage	The Oval	Glentoran	0 – 1	Linfield	
1921–22	17 April 1922	Gold Cup	Group stage	The Oval	Glentoran	1 – 0	Linfield	
1921–22	20 May 1922	Gold Cup	Group stage	Windsor Park	Linfield	5 – 1	Glentoran	
1922–23	9 December 1922	City Cup	Group stage	Windsor Park	Linfield	2 – 3	Glentoran	7,000
1922–23	30 December 1922	City Cup	Group stage	The Oval	Glentoran	0 – 0	Linfield	
1922–23	10 March 1923	County Antrim Shield	Final	Solitude	Linfield	4 – 1	Glentoran	
1922–23	31 March 1923	Irish Cup	Final	Solitude	Linfield	2 – 0	Glentoran	
1922–23	14 April 1923	Gold Cup	Group stage	Windsor Park	Linfield	2 – 2	Glentoran	
1922–23	7 May 1923	Gold Cup	Group stage	The Oval	Glentoran	0 – 2	Linfield	
1923–24	5 April 1924	City Cup	Group stage	Windsor Park	Linfield	2 – 3	Glentoran	
1923–24	13 May 1924	Belfast Charity Cup	Quarter-final	Windsor Park	Linfield	1 – 3	Glentoran	
1924–25	4 April 1925	City Cup	Group stage	Windsor Park	Linfield	2 – 2	Glentoran	
1925–26	2 January 1926	County Antrim Shield	Quarter-final	The Oval	Glentoran	3 – 2	Linfield	
1925–26	6 February 1926	Irish Cup	Semi-final	Solitude	Linfield	2 – 2	Glentoran	
1925–26	10 February 1926	Irish Cup	Semi-final replay	Solitude	Glentoran	2 – 2	Linfield	
1925–26	17 February 1926	Irish Cup	Semi-final replay	Windsor Park	Linfield	3 – 2	Glentoran	
1925–26	24 April 1926	City Cup	Group stage	Windsor Park	Linfield	1 – 2	Glentoran	
1926–27	2 April 1927	City Cup	Group stage	Windsor Park	Linfield	5 – 0	Glentoran	
1926–27	14 May 1927	Belfast Charity Cup	Final	Solitude	Linfield	5 – 2	Glentoran	
1927–28	14 April 1928	City Cup	Group stage	The Oval	Glentoran	0 – 2	Linfield	
1928–29	2 April 1929	City Cup	Group stage	The Oval	Glentoran	0 – 2	Linfield	
1929–30	12 February 1930	Irish Cup	Semi-final	Windsor Park	Linfield	2 – 1	Glentoran	
1929–30	9 April 1930	County Antrim Shield	Final	Solitude	Linfield	3 – 1	Glentoran	
1929–30	22 April 1930	City Cup	Group stage	The Oval	Glentoran	2 – 1	Linfield	
1930–31	27 August 1930	Gold Cup	First round	The Oval	Glentoran	1 – 2	Linfield	
1930–31	7 February 1931	Irish Cup	Semi-final	Celtic Park	Linfield	5 – 1	Glentoran	
1930–31	18 April 1931	City Cup	Group stage	Windsor Park	Linfield	6 – 1	Glentoran	
1931–32	27 February 1932	City Cup	Group stage	The Oval	Glentoran	5 – 2	Linfield	
1931–32	9 March 1932	County Antrim Shield	Semi-final	Solitude	Glentoran	0 – 2	Linfield	
1931–32	26 March 1932	Irish Cup	Final	Celtic Park	Glentoran	2 – 1	Linfield	
1932–33	15 March 1933	County Antrim Shield	Quarter-final	The Oval	Glentoran	0 – 1	Linfield	
1932–33	15 April 1933	City Cup	Group stage	The Oval	Glentoran	1 – 1	Linfield	
1933–34	21 February 1934	County Antrim Shield	Quarter-final	Windsor Park	Linfield	5 – 1	Glentoran	
1933–34	24 March 1934	City Cup	Group stage	The Oval	Linfield	3 – 0	Glentoran	
1933–34	12 May 1934	Belfast Charity Cup	Semi-final	Grosvenor Park	Glentoran	0 – 4	Linfield	
1934–35	16 February 1935	City Cup	Group stage	The Oval	Glentoran	3 – 1	Linfield	
1934–35	23 February 1935	Irish Cup	Quarter-final	The Oval	Glentoran	4 – 2	Linfield	
1935–36	8 February 1936	City Cup	Group stage	Windsor Park	Linfield	3 – 1	Glentoran	
1936–37	20 February 1937	Irish Cup	Quarter-final	The Oval	Glentoran	0 – 0	Linfield	
1936–37	24 February 1937	Irish Cup	Quarter-final replay	Windsor Park	Linfield	6 – 1	Glentoran	
1936–37	17 April 1937	City Cup	Group stage	Windsor Park	Linfield	3 – 0	Glentoran	
1937–38	8 September 1937	Gold Cup	Group stage	Windsor Park	Linfield	0 – 1	Glentoran	
1937–38	6 April 1938	City Cup	Group stage	Windsor Park	Linfield	4 – 1	Glentoran	
1937–38	19 May 1938	Belfast Charity Cup	Final	Solitude	Linfield	3 – 1	Glentoran	
1938–39	18 February 1939	City Cup	Group stage	Windsor Park	Linfield	2 – 0	Glentoran	
1938–39	13 May 1939	Belfast Charity Cup	Semi-final	Solitude	Linfield	2 – 1	Glentoran	
1939–40	23 August 1939	City Cup	Group stage	The Oval	Glentoran	1 – 1	Linfield	
1939–40	24 April 1940	County Antrim Shield	Final	Solitude	Glentoran	4 – 0	Linfield	
1940–41	7 September 1940	Substitute Gold Cup	Group stage	Windsor Park	Linfield	2 – 1	Glentoran	
1940–41	26 October 1940	Substitute Gold Cup	Group stage	The Oval	Glentoran	3 – 3	Linfield	
1941–42	27 September 1941	Substitute Gold Cup	Group stage	Grosvenor Park	Glentoran	4 – 6	Linfield	
1941–42	1 November 1941	Substitute Gold Cup	Group stage	Windsor Park	Linfield	1 – 3	Glentoran	
1941–42	18 April 1942	Irish Cup	Final	Celtic Park	Linfield	3 – 1	Glentoran	
1942–43	29 August 1942	Substitute Gold Cup	Group stage	Windsor Park	Linfield	6 – 1	Glentoran	
1942–43	10 October 1942	Substitute Gold Cup	Group stage	Grosvenor Park	Glentoran	1 – 4	Linfield	
1943–44	21 August 1943	Substitute Gold Cup	Group stage	Windsor Park	Linfield	3 – 1	Glentoran	
1943–44	2 October 1943	Substitute Gold Cup	Group stage	Grosvenor Park	Glentoran	1 – 1	Linfield	
1944–45	19 August 1944	Substitute Gold Cup	Group stage	Grosvenor Park	Glentoran	0 – 4	Linfield	
1944–45	30 September 1944	Substitute Gold Cup	Group stage	Windsor Park	Linfield	7 – 0	Glentoran	
1944–45	14 April 1945	Irish Cup	Final	Celtic Park	Linfield	4 – 2	Glentoran	20,000
1945–46	8 September 1945	Substitute Gold Cup	Group stage	Grosvenor Park	Glentoran	1 – 3	Linfield	
1945–46	20 October 1945	Substitute Gold Cup	Group stage	Windsor Park	Linfield	0 – 3	Glentoran	
1946–47	21 August 1946	Substitute Gold Cup	Group stage	Windsor Park	Linfield	2 – 1	Glentoran	
1946–47	14 September 1946	Substitute Gold Cup	Group stage	Grosvenor Park	Glentoran	0 – 2	Linfield	
1947–48	2 September 1947	Gold Cup	Second round	Grosvenor Park	Glentoran	3 – 1	Linfield	
1947–48	18 October 1947	City Cup	Group stage	Grosvenor Park	Glentoran	3 – 1	Linfield	
1947–48	31 December 1947	City Cup	Second place playoff	Solitude	Glentoran	3 – 2	Linfield	
1947–48	14 April 1948	County Antrim Shield	Quarter-final	Grosvenor Park	Glentoran	1 – 1	Linfield	
1947–48	20 April 1948	County Antrim Shield	Quarter-final replay	Windsor Park	Linfield	2 – 0	Glentoran	
1948–49	21 August 1948	City Cup	Group stage	Windsor Park	Linfield	1 – 1	Glentoran	
1948–49	22 January 1949	Irish Cup	First round	Solitude	Linfield	0 – 2	Glentoran	
1949–50	20 August 1949	City Cup	Group stage	The Oval	Glentoran	2 – 3	Linfield	
1949–50	31 August 1949	Gold Cup	Quarter-final	The Oval	Glentoran	1 – 1	Linfield	
1949–50	20 September 1949	Gold Cup	Quarter-final replay	Windsor Park	Linfield	6 – 0	Glentoran	
1949–50	11 February 1950	Irish Cup	Quarter-final	Windsor Park	Linfield	3 – 0	Glentoran	
1949–50	13 May 1950	County Antrim Shield	Final	Solitude	Glentoran	2 – 0	Linfield	
1950–51	26 August 1950	City Cup	Group stage	Windsor Park	Linfield	1 – 1	Glentoran	
1950–51	20 September 1950	Gold Cup	Final	Solitude	Linfield	5 – 1	Glentoran	
1950–51	10 January 1951	Ulster Cup	Final	Grosvenor Park	Glentoran	2 – 1	Linfield	
1950–51	7 April 1951	Irish Cup	Semi-final	The Oval	Glentoran	3 – 1	Linfield	
1951–52	18 August 1951	City Cup	Group stage	The Oval	Glentoran	1 – 1	Linfield	
1951–52	15 March 1952	Irish Cup	Quarter-final	Windsor Park	Linfield	0 – 0	Glentoran	
1951–52	2 April 1952	Irish Cup	Quarter-final replay	The Oval	Glentoran	2 – 2	Linfield	
1951–52	9 April 1952	Irish Cup	Quarter-final replay	Windsor Park	Linfield	0 – 0	Glentoran	
1951–52	17 April 1952	Irish Cup	Quarter-final replay	The Oval	Glentoran	1 – 0	Linfield	
1951–52	12 May 1952	City Cup	Playoff	Grosvenor Park	Glentoran	2 – 3	Linfield	
1952–53	13 September 1952	City Cup	Group stage	Windsor Park	Linfield	1 – 1	Glentoran	
1952–53	28 March 1953	Irish Cup	Semi-final	Windsor Park	Linfield	2 – 1	Glentoran	
1953–54	29 August 1953	City Cup	Group stage	The Oval	Glentoran	0 – 0	Linfield	
1953–54	2 October 1953	Mercer Cup	Group stage	Grosvenor Park	Linfield	1 – 5	Glentoran	
1954–55	11 September 1954	City Cup	Group stage	Windsor Park	Linfield	3 – 1	Glentoran	
1955–56	10 September 1955	City Cup	Group stage	The Oval	Glentoran	0 – 0	Linfield	
1955–56	23 November 1955	Gold Cup	Semi-final	Solitude	Linfield	4 – 2	Glentoran	
1956–57	29 August 1956	Ulster Cup	Group stage	Windsor Park	Linfield	3 – 2	Glentoran	
1956–57	2 March 1957	Irish Cup	Quarter-final	Windsor Park	Linfield	2 – 2	Glentoran	
1956–57	6 March 1957	Irish Cup	Semi-final replay	The Oval	Glentoran	1 – 2	Linfield	
1956–57	16 March 1957	City Cup	Group stage	The Oval	Glentoran	1 – 2	Linfield	
1957–58	7 September 1957	City Cup	Group stage	Windsor Park	Linfield	3 – 3	Glentoran	
1957–58	2 May 1958	County Antrim Shield	Semi-final	Solitude	Linfield	2 – 0	Glentoran	
1958–59	6 September 1958	City Cup	Group stage	The Oval	Glentoran	2 – 2	Linfield	
1958–59	1 October 1958	Gold Cup	Semi-final	Grosvenor Park	Linfield	2 – 5	Glentoran	
1959–60	5 September 1959	City Cup	Group stage	Windsor Park	Linfield	3 – 3	Glentoran	
1960–61	10 September 1960	City Cup	Group stage	Windsor Park	Linfield	2 – 2	Glentoran	
1960–61	9 May 1961	Gold Cup	Final	Solitude	Glentoran	4 – 2	Linfield	
1960–61	13 May 1961	County Antrim Shield	Final	Solitude	Linfield	2 – 1	Glentoran	
1961–62	9 September 1961	City Cup	Group stage	The Oval	Glentoran	1 – 2	Linfield	
1961–62	14 November 1961	Ulster Cup	Final	Windsor Park	Linfield	2 – 0	Glentoran	
1961–62	5 December 1961	Gold Cup	Final	Grosvenor Park	Linfield	4 – 0	Glentoran	
1961–62	30 January 1962	North-South Cup	Final	Windsor Park	Linfield	0 – 0	Glentoran	
1961–62	5 February 1962	North-South Cup	Final replay	Grosvenor Park	Linfield	7 – 1	Glentoran	
1961–62	12 May 1962	County Antrim Shield	Final	Solitude	Linfield	5 – 0	Glentoran	
1962–63	8 September 1962	City Cup	Group stage	Windsor Park	Linfield	3 – 0	Glentoran	
1962–63	11 September 1962	Gold Cup	First round	The Oval	Glentoran	1 – 0	Linfield	
1962–63	9 April 1963	County Antrim Shield	Quarter-final	Windsor Park	Linfield	2 – 2	Glentoran	
1962–63	23 April 1963	County Antrim Shield	Quarter-final replay	The Oval	Glentoran	1 – 1	Linfield	
1962–63	1 May 1963	County Antrim Shield	Quarter-final replay	Solitude	Linfield	3 – 1	Glentoran	
1963–64	7 September 1963	City Cup	Group stage	The Oval	Glentoran	1 – 5	Linfield	
1963–64	15 January 1964	Gold Cup	Final	Windsor Park	Linfield	2 – 2	Glentoran	
1963–64	12 February 1964	Gold Cup	Final replay	Windsor Park	Linfield	3 – 2	Glentoran	
1963–64	2 May 1964	County Antrim Shield	Semi-final	Solitude	Linfield	1 – 5	Glentoran	
1964–65	5 September 1964	City Cup	Group stage	Windsor Park	Linfield	1 – 2	Glentoran	
1964–65	2 December 1964	Ulster Cup	Final	Windsor Park	Linfield	1 – 0	Glentoran	
1965–66	14 August 1965	Ulster Cup	Group stage	Windsor Park	Linfield	4 – 1	Glentoran	
1965–66	23 April 1966	Irish Cup	Final	The Oval	Glentoran	2 – 0	Linfield	20,000
1965–66	2 May 1966	County Antrim Shield	Quarter-final	Windsor Park	Linfield	3 – 2	Glentoran	
1965–66	17 May 1966	City Cup	Group stage	The Oval	Glentoran	1 – 1	Linfield	
1966–67	13 August 1966	Ulster Cup	Group stage	The Oval	Glentoran	2 – 1	Linfield	
1966–67	1 April 1967	Irish Cup	Semi-final	The Oval	Glentoran	1 – 0	Linfield	
1966–67	2 May 1967	City Cup	Group stage	Windsor Park	Linfield	1 – 0	Glentoran	
1966–67	6 May 1967	County Antrim Shield	Semi-final	Solitude	Linfield	2 – 1	Glentoran	11,500
1966–67	8 May 1967	Top Four Cup	Semi-final	Solitude	Linfield	walkover^{4}	Glentoran	
1967–68	30 August 1967	Ulster Cup	Group stage	Windsor Park	Linfield	3 – 2	Glentoran	
1967–68	1 April 1968	Top Four Cup	Semi-final	Windsor Park	Linfield	2 – 2	Glentoran	
1967–68	9 April 1968	Top Four Cup	Semi-final replay	The Oval	Glentoran	1 – 2	Linfield	
1967–68	20 April 1968	City Cup	Group stage	The Oval	Glentoran	0 – 1	Linfield	
1967–68	11 May 1968	County Antrim Shield	Final	Solitude	Glentoran	3 – 3	Linfield	
1967–68	13 May 1968	County Antrim Shield	Final replay	Solitude	Glentoran	3 – 0	Linfield	
1968–69	5 August 1968	Ulster Cup	Group stage	The Oval	Glentoran	1 – 1	Linfield	
1968–69	20 November 1968	Gold Cup	Final	Windsor Park	Linfield	0 – 0	Glentoran	20,000
1968–69	4 December 1968	Gold Cup	Final replay	The Oval	Linfield	2 – 1	Glentoran	
1968–69	22 February 1969	City Cup	Group stage	Windsor Park	Linfield	2 – 0	Glentoran	
1968–69	18 March 1969	Top Four Cup	Semi-final	Windsor Park	Linfield	1 – 0	Glentoran	
1969–70	20 January 1970	Ulster Cup	Group stage	Windsor Park	Linfield	0 – 0	Glentoran	
1970–71	22 August 1970	Ulster Cup	Group stage	The Oval	Glentoran	1 – 2	Linfield	
1970–71	7 November 1970	City Cup	Group stage	Windsor Park	Linfield	1 – 2	Glentoran	
1970–71	17 March 1971	Gold Cup	Final	The Oval	Linfield	2 – 1	Glentoran	15,000
1971–72	20 October 1971	Ulster Cup	Group stage	Windsor Park	Linfield	2 – 1	Glentoran	
1971–72	18 April 1972	Gold Cup	Quarter-final	Windsor Park	Linfield	0 – 0	Glentoran	
1971–72	25 April 1972	Gold Cup	Quarter-final replay	The Oval	Glentoran	3 – 0	Linfield	
1972–73	26 August 1972	Ulster Cup	Group stage	The Oval	Glentoran	1 – 2	Linfield	
1972–73	28 April 1973	Irish Cup	Final	Windsor Park	Glentoran	3 – 2	Linfield	12,000
1972–73	3 May 1973	County Antrim Shield	Semi final 1st leg	Windsor Park	Linfield	1 – 1	Glentoran	
1972–73	12 May 1973	County Antrim Shield	Semi final 2nd leg	The Oval	Glentoran	2 – 3	Linfield	
1973–74	25 August 1973	Ulster Cup	Group stage	Windsor Park	Linfield	6 – 0	Glentoran	
1974–75	24 August 1974	Ulster Cup	Group stage	The Oval	Glentoran	5 – 1	Linfield	
1975–76	23 August 1975	Ulster Cup	Group stage	Windsor Park	Linfield	5 – 0	Glentoran	
1975–76	15 October 1975	City Cup	Final	Windsor Park	Linfield	1 – 3	Glentoran	
1975–76	13 March 1976	Irish Cup	Semi-final	The Oval	Glentoran	0 – 2	Linfield	
1976–77	25 August 1976	Ulster Cup	Group stage	The Oval	Glentoran	6 – 2	Linfield	
1976–77	23 November 1976	Gold Cup	Final	Windsor Park	Glentoran	5 – 1	Linfield	10,000
1976–77	5 February 1977	Irish Cup	First round	The Oval	Glentoran	1 – 1	Linfield	
1976–77	8 February 1977	Irish Cup	First round replay	Windsor Park	Linfield	3 – 0	Glentoran	
1976–77	14 May 1977	County Antrim Shield	Final	Windsor Park	Linfield	3 – 1	Glentoran	
1977–78	26 August 1977	Ulster Cup	Group stage	The Oval	Glentoran	1 – 2	Linfield	
1977–78	25 February 1978	Irish Cup	Quarter-final	Windsor Park	Linfield	4 – 3	Glentoran	
1978–79	26 August 1978	Ulster Cup	Group stage	Windsor Park	Linfield	0 – 0	Glentoran	
1979–80	6 October 1979	Ulster Cup	Group stage	The Oval	Glentoran	1 – 1	Linfield	
1979–80	23 February 1980	Irish Cup	Quarter-final	Windsor Park	Linfield	4 – 0	Glentoran	
1980–81	4 October 1980	Ulster Cup	Group stage	Windsor Park	Linfield	1 – 1	Glentoran	
1980–81	4 May 1981	County Antrim Shield	Final	Windsor Park	Linfield	4 – 1	Glentoran	
1981–82	25 August 1981	Ulster Cup	Group stage	The Oval	Glentoran	1 – 1	Linfield	
1981–82	6 April 1982	County Antrim Shield	First round	Windsor Park	Linfield	1 – 0	Glentoran	
1982–83	22 September 1982	Gold Cup	Final	Windsor Park	Glentoran	2 – 0	Linfield	
1982–83	2 October 1982	Ulster Cup	Group stage	Windsor Park	Linfield	5 – 2	Glentoran	
1982–83	30 April 1983	Irish Cup	Final	Windsor Park	Glentoran	1 – 1	Linfield	12,000
1982–83	7 May 1983	Irish Cup	Final replay	The Oval	Glentoran	2 – 1	Linfield	8,000
1982–83	12 May 1983	County Antrim Shield	Final	Windsor Park	Linfield	4 – 1	Glentoran	8,000
1983–84	24 September 1983	Ulster Cup	Group stage	Windsor Park	Linfield	2 – 3	Glentoran	
1983–84	18 October 1983	Gold Cup	Final	Windsor Park	Linfield	3 – 1	Glentoran	
1983–84	29 October 1983	Ulster Cup	Group stage	The Oval	Glentoran	1 – 1	Linfield	
1984–85	9 October 1984	Gold Cup	Final	Windsor Park	Linfield	3 – 1	Glentoran	
1984–85	18 April 1985	County Antrim Shield	Quarter-final	Windsor Park	Linfield	0 – 1	Glentoran	
1984–85	4 May 1985	Irish Cup	Final	Windsor Park	Glentoran	1 – 1	Linfield	12,000
1984–85	11 May 1985	Irish Cup	Final replay	Windsor Park	Glentoran	1 – 0	Linfield	12,000
1985–86	31 August 1985	Gold Cup	Group stage	Windsor Park	Linfield	4 – 0	Glentoran	
1986–87	25 April 1987	Gold Cup	Final	The Oval	Glentoran	3 – 2	Linfield	
1987–88	13 August 1987	County Antrim Shield	Quarter-final	The Oval	Glentoran	3 – 1	Linfield	
1987–88	28 October 1987	Gold Cup	Semi-final	Windsor Park	Linfield	1 – 1 (5 – 4 pens)	Glentoran	
1987–88	19 April 1988	County Antrim Chalice	Quarter-final	Windsor Park	Linfield	0 – 2	Glentoran	
1988–89	30 November 1988	League Cup	Final	The Oval	Glentoran	2 – 1	Linfield	10,000
1988–89	11 March 1989	Irish Cup	Quarter-final	The Oval	Glentoran	0 – 3	Linfield	
1989–90	30 August 1989	Ulster Cup	Quarter-final	The Oval	Glentoran	3 – 1	Linfield	
1989–90	21 October 1989	League Cup	Second round	Windsor Park	Linfield	0 – 4	Glentoran	
1989–90	7 March 1990	Floodlit Cup	Final	Windsor Park	Glentoran	4 – 2	Linfield	
1989–90	7 April 1990	Irish Cup	Semi-final	Windsor Park	Glentoran	2 – 0	Linfield	
1989–90	26 April 1990	County Antrim Shield	Final	The Oval	Glentoran	0 – 0 (6 – 5 pens)	Linfield	
1990–91	29 August 1990	Ulster Cup	Quarter-final	The Oval	Glentoran	0 – 1	Linfield	
1993–94	23 November 1993	Floodlit Cup	Quarter-final	Windsor Park	Linfield	3 – 2 (aet)	Glentoran	
1993–94	29 March 1994	League Cup	Quarter-final	Windsor Park	Linfield	2 – 1	Glentoran	
1994–95	20 August 1994	Ulster Cup	Group stage	The Oval	Glentoran	0 – 1	Linfield	
1995–96	16 August 1995	League Cup	Quarter-final	The Oval	Glentoran	0 – 1	Linfield	
1995–96	28 November 1995	Gold Cup	Quarter-final	Windsor Park	Linfield	2 – 2 (4 – 3 pens)	Glentoran	
1995–96	6 February 1996	Floodlit Cup	Quarter-final	Windsor Park	Glentoran	2 – 1	Linfield	
1997–98	9 September 1997	League Cup	Final	Windsor Park	Linfield	1 – 0	Glentoran	
1997–98	4 April 1998	Irish Cup	Semi-final	Windsor Park	Linfield	1 – 2	Glentoran	
1998–99	12 January 1999	County Antrim Shield	Semi-final	Windsor Park	Linfield	1 – 2	Glentoran	
1998–99	4 May 1999	League Cup	Final	Windsor Park	Linfield	2 – 1	Glentoran	6,500
1999–2000	30 November 1999	Gold Cup	Final	Windsor Park	Glentoran	4 – 2	Linfield	
1999–2000	31 December 1999	County Antrim Shield	Quarter-final	The Oval	Glentoran	1 – 0	Linfield	
1999–2000	8 April 2000	Irish Cup	Semi-final	Windsor Park	Glentoran	3 – 2	Linfield	
2000–01	5 August 2000	Charity Shield	Final	Windsor Park	Linfield	2 – 0	Glentoran	
2000–01	30 January 2001	County Antrim Shield	Final	Windsor Park	Linfield	2 – 1	Glentoran	
2000–01	5 May 2001	Irish Cup	Final	Windsor Park	Glentoran	1 – 0 (aet)	Linfield	14,190
2001–02	9 October 2001	League Cup	Group stage	Windsor Park	Linfield	0 – 0	Glentoran	
2001–02	27 November 2001	League Cup	Final	Windsor Park	Linfield	3 – 1	Glentoran	6,200
2001–02	27 February 2002	County Antrim Shield	Final	The Oval	Glentoran	2 – 0	Linfield	
2002–03	24 September 2002	League Cup	Group stage	The Oval	Glentoran	1 – 1	Linfield	
2002–03	3 December 2002	League Cup	Final	Windsor Park	Glentoran	2 – 0	Linfield	5,700
2002–03	24 February 2003	County Antrim Shield	Semi-final	Windsor Park	Linfield	0 – 1	Glentoran	
2003–04	4 February 2004	County Antrim Shield	Semi-final	The Oval	Glentoran	0 – 1	Linfield	
2003–04	6 March 2004	Irish Cup	Quarter-final	Windsor Park	Linfield	0 – 1	Glentoran	
2004–05	9 November 2004	League Cup	Final	Windsor Park	Glentoran	2 – 1 (aet)	Linfield	6,000
2004–05	12 February 2005	Irish Cup	Sixth round	The Oval	Glentoran	1 – 1	Linfield	
2004–05	15 February 2005	Irish Cup	Sixth round replay	Windsor Park	Linfield	0 – 3	Glentoran	
2004–05	19 April 2005	Setanta Cup	Group stage	Windsor Park	Linfield	3 – 2	Glentoran	
2004–05	16 May 2005	Setanta Cup	Group stage	The Oval	Glentoran	2 – 4	Linfield	
2005–06	10 December 2005	League Cup	Final	Windsor Park	Linfield	3 – 0	Glentoran	6,845
2005–06	24 January 2006	County Antrim Shield	Semi-final	Windsor Park	Linfield	1 – 0	Glentoran	
2005–06	28 February 2006	Setanta Cup	Group stage	The Oval	Glentoran	3 – 3	Linfield	
2005–06	3 April 2006	Setanta Cup	Group stage	Windsor Park	Linfield	6 – 0	Glentoran	
2005–06	6 May 2006	Irish Cup	Final	Windsor Park	Linfield	2 – 1	Glentoran	12,500
2006–07	7 November 2006	League Cup	Semi-final	Windsor Park	Linfield	0 – 0 (3 – 4 pens)	Glentoran	
2006–07	5 March 2007	Setanta Cup	Group stage	Windsor Park	Linfield	1 – 1	Glentoran	
2006–07	17 April 2007	Setanta Cup	Group stage	The Oval	Glentoran	1 – 2	Linfield	
2007–08	7 April 2008	Setanta Cup	Group stage	The Oval	Glentoran	1 – 3	Linfield	
2008–09	15 September 2008	Setanta Cup	Group stage	Windsor Park	Linfield	1 – 4	Glentoran	
2009–10	29 September 2009	County Antrim Shield	Quarter-final	The Oval	Glentoran	1 – 2	Linfield	
2009–10	5 December 2009	League Cup	Quarter-final 1st leg	The Oval	Glentoran	0 – 1	Linfield	
2009–10	15 December 2009	League Cup	Quarter-final 2nd leg	Windsor Park	Linfield	1 – 2	Glentoran	
2009–10	6 March 2010	Irish Cup	Quarter-final	The Oval	Glentoran	1 – 3	Linfield	
2010–11	30 November 2010	County Antrim Shield	Final	Windsor Park	Glentoran	3 – 1	Linfield	
2010–11	9 April 2011	Irish Cup	Semi-final	Windsor Park	Linfield	2 – 0	Glentoran	
2012–13	1 October 2012	County Antrim Shield	Quarter-final	The Oval	Glentoran	2 – 3	Linfield	
2013–14	8 October 2013	League Cup	Third round	The Oval	Glentoran	0 – 0 (2 – 4 pens)	Linfield	
2016–17	7 January 2017	Irish Cup	Fifth round	The Oval	Glentoran	1 – 2 (aet)	Linfield	
2017–18	9 May 2018	Europa League play-offs	Semi-final	Windsor Park	Linfield	3 – 4	Glentoran	
2018–19	23 October 2018	County Antrim Shield	Quarter-final	Windsor Park	Linfield	2 – 1 (aet)	Glentoran	
2022–23	15 November 2022	County Antrim Shield	Semi-final	Windsor Park	Linfield	2 – 1	Glentoran	
2022–23	6 December 2022	League Cup	Semi-final	The Oval	Glentoran	0 – 3	Linfield	
2023–24	7 November 2023	League Cup	Second round	The Oval	Glentoran	1 – 2	Linfield	
2023–24	29 March 2024	Irish Cup	Semi-final	The Oval	Glentoran	1 – 3	Linfield	
2024–25	3 December 2023	League Cup	Second round	Windsor Park	Linfield	0 – 1	Glentoran	
2024–25	29 March 2024	Irish Cup	Sixth round	The Oval	Glentoran	2 – 1 (aet)	Linfield	

- ^{1} Match ended early after Glentoran players refused to continue claiming a Linfield player punched a shot clear from the goal-line and no penalty had been awarded
- ^{2} Linfield competed as the "New Blues" due to the club not having registered with the newly-formed "New Irish Football Association"
- ^{3} Linfield were leading 1-0 when the match was abandoned due to a snowstorm. A replay was ordered but Linfield refused to play and Glentoran were awarded victory
- ^{4} Linfield were awarded victory as Glentoran refused to play at Solitude
