= Elisha Scott =

Northern Irish footballer (1893–1959)

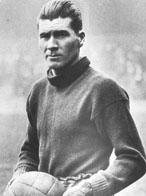

Personal information
- Date of birth: 24 August 1893
- Place of birth: Belfast, Ireland
- Date of death: 16 May 1959 (aged 65)
- Place of death: Belfast, Northern Ireland
- Height: 5 ft 10 in (1.77 m)
- Position: Goalkeeper

Youth career
- 1909: Belfast Boys' Brigade

Senior career*
Years	Team	Apps	(Gls)
1911–1912	Broadway United		
1911	Linfield		
1912–1915	Liverpool	28	(0)
1915–1916	Belfast United		
1916	Linfield		
1916–1919	Belfast Celtic		
1919–1934	Liverpool	402	(0)
1934–1936	Belfast Celtic		
Total		430	(0)

International career
1920–1936	Ireland (IFA)	31	(0)
1935	Irish League XI	2	(0)

Managerial career
- 1934–1949: Belfast Celtic
- * Club domestic league appearances and goals

Elisha Scott (24 August 1893 – 16 May 1959) was a Northern Irish football goalkeeper who played for Liverpool from 1912 to 1915 and from 1919 to 1934, and still holds the record as their longest-serving player. He also held the club record for most league appearances until it was surpassed by winger Billy Liddell in 1957.

Scott won back-to-back league championships with Liverpool in 1922 and 1923. Marking 100 seasons of English football in 1998, he was named in the Football League 100 Legends. Labelled "The First King of the Kop", his legendary status at Liverpool saw him honoured with a plinth outside Anfield in 2018. In 2026 Scott was listed at number 32 in an official poll of the club's greatest players.

During his playing career Scott was the recipient of one of the earliest terrace chants. Renowned for his agility, courage, and charismatic leadership in goal, Scott was described by Everton striker Dixie Dean as "the greatest I've ever seen".

== Life and playing career ==
Elisha Scott played for Linfield and Broadway United before Liverpool manager Tom Watson signed him at 10 am on Sunday 1 September 1912, following a recommendation from Scott's older brother Billy Scott. Liverpool only got the chance to sign Scott when Everton decided that the 19-year-old was too young and inexperienced.

Scott made his Liverpool debut on 1 January 1913 at St James' Park in which he kept a clean sheet in a draw with Newcastle. Described by the Liverpool Echo as "an electrifying goalkeeper. Never stood still for a second", his 21 years of service to the club between 1913 to 1934 saw him become Liverpool's longest-serving player. He also held the club record for most league appearances until it was overtaken by winger Billy Liddell in the 1950s.

"Contemporary reports describe him as lithe and cat-like in his agility."

— Journalist John Keith.

During the early days of his career, Scott was understudy to Ken Campbell and only appeared occasionally. The First World War interrupted Scott's career for four years. He finally got a chance of a run in the Liverpool goal at the end of the first season after the war. Scott's goalkeeping position was set in stone when Campbell was allowed to leave in April 1920. Scott established himself as Liverpool's number 1. He was a major part of the back-to-back championship winning teams of 1922 and 1923, a team dubbed "the Untouchables" by the press, missing just three games of the first title and none in the second. Scott frequently drew as much adulation from the Kop for his saves as a Liverpool goal. The first game of the defence of their league title in August 1922 saw Liverpool beat Arsenal 5–2, with Scott pulling off a string of saves from Reg Boreham and the Arsenal attack. That day's Liverpool Echo reported: "It was an astonishing piece of goalkeeping, and the crowd went crazy for it". He accumulated 21 clean sheets of the 42 league fixtures in the 1922–23 season.

“Lisha, Lisha, Lisha"

— Scott was the recipient of an early terrace chant.

Numerous stories about Scott exist in Liverpool folklore. One such story relates to a 1924 game, after Scott had just made a phenomenal save at Ewood Park against Blackburn. A man appeared from the crowd went over to Scott and kissed him. Scott was part of one of the legendary rivalries of the day along with Everton's Dixie Dean. The two of them were the main topic of discussion when derby day was approaching – Everton declared that Dean would score whilst Liverpool disagreed, saying Scott wouldn't let a single shot past. A famous story, possibly apocryphal, associated with the two men was that of how they once encountered each other in Belfast city centre the day before an Ireland versus England game. Dean, famed for his remarkable heading ability, touched his hat and nodded to Scott as they were about to pass only for Scott to respond by diving as if to try to save an imaginary header, much to the initial shock and then delight of the locals who witnessed it while a mildly shocked Dean smiled and quietly continued on his walk.

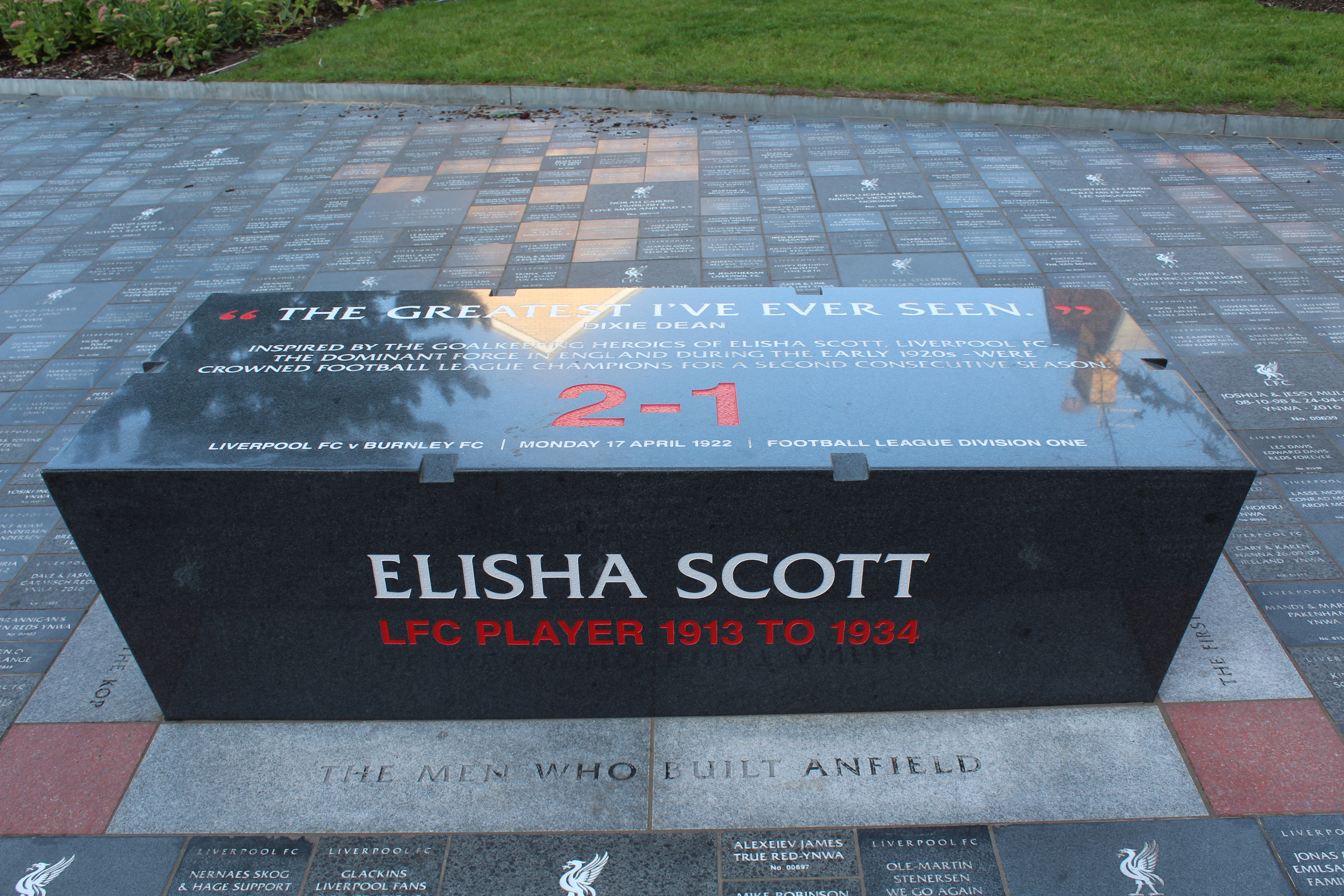
Scott's plinth outside Anfield as one of the "Men who built Anfield"

Following the arrival of prolific striker Gordon Hodgson in 1925, the club's best players were at either end of the pitch, Scott in goal and Hodgson, who went on to become the fourth-highest goalscorer in English top-flight history, in attack. Towards the end of the decade, Scott, now in his mid-30s, lost his starting position to another Liverpool goalkeeper, Arthur Riley, but he never gave up the battle for the starting berth. However, at the beginning of the 1930s it was becoming more and more difficult for Scott to get into the line-up. Eventually Scott asked if he could return to his homeland when his old team Belfast Celtic offered him a player-manager role in 1934. Liverpool consented to the request and at the age of 40-and-a-half Scott played the last of his 468 appearances at Chelsea on 21 February 1934. Upon Liverpool's final home match of the season, Scott headed to the director's box to give the supporters a farewell speech over the microphone. He finished by saying, "Last, but not least, my friends of the Kop. I cannot thank them sufficiently. They have inspired me. God bless you all."

Scott played his final game for Belfast Celtic in 1936 at the age of 42. In his time as manager of Belfast Celtic, Scott won 10 Irish League titles, 6 Irish Cups, 3 City Cups, 8 Gold Cups and 5 County Antrim Shields. He died in 1959 and is buried in Belfast City Cemetery.

== Career statistics ==
Appearances and goals by national team and year
National team	Year	Apps	Goals
Ireland	1920	2	0
Ireland	1921	3	0
Ireland	1925	2	0
Ireland	1926	3	0
Ireland	1927	3	0
Ireland	1928	3	0
Ireland	1929	3	0
Ireland	1930	1	0
Ireland	1931	1	0
Ireland	1932	3	0
Ireland	1933	3	0
Ireland	1934	1	0
Ireland	1935	2	0
Ireland	1936	1	0
Total		31	0

== Honours ==
=== Player ===
Liverpool

- Football League First Division: 1921–22, 1922–23

Belfast Celtic

- Irish League: 1918–19, 1935–36
- Irish Cup: 1917–18
- Gold Cup: 1934–35
- County Antrim Shield: 1935–36

Individual

- Football League 100 Legends
- Liverpool F.C. Hall of Fame

=== Manager ===
Belfast Celtic

- Irish League: 1935–36, 1936–37, 1937–38, 1938–39, 1939–40, 1947–48
- Irish Cup: 1936–37, 1937–38, 1940–41, 1942–43, 1943–44, 1946–47
- Gold Cup: 1934–35, 1938–39, 1939–40
- County Antrim Shield: 1935–36, 1936–37, 1938–39, 1942–43, 1944–45
- City Cup: 1939–40, 1947–48, 1948–49
- Northern Regional League: 1940–41, 1941–42, 1943–44, 1946–47
- Substitute Gold Cup: 1940–41, 1943–44, 1944–45, 1945–46, 1946–47

== Sources ==
- The Official Liverpool FC Illustrated History (Carlton Books 2002), p. 37.
