= Malcolm Brodie =

Malcolm Brodie may refer to:

- Malcolm Brodie (politician) (born c.1949), mayor of Richmond, British Columbia
- Malcolm Brodie (journalist) (1926–2013), Scottish-born journalist from Northern Ireland
