= 1911–12 Irish Cup =

32nd edition of the Irish Cup

Tournament details
- Country: Ireland
- Date: 20 January 1912 – 2 March 1912
- Teams: 21

Final positions
- Champions: Linfield (tournament not finished)

Tournament statistics
- Matches played: 7
- Goals scored: 22 (3.14 per match)

The 1911–12 Irish Cup was the 32nd edition of the Irish Cup, the premier knock-out cup competition in Irish football.

The tournament for this season was beset by controversy - an Irish League Second Division had been formed for the first time, but the clubs in this division were placed in the draw for the Irish Cup by the Irish Football Association (IFA). However, these clubs did not wish to participate in the "senior" Irish Cup due to their "junior" status - their preference was to participate in the Steel & Sons Cup instead, which they were not permitted to do. These clubs subsequently withdrew from the Irish Cup despite being drawn originally in the first round.

After various disputes over the course of the season and by the time the tournament had reached the semi-finals, three of the four semi-finalists (Cliftonville, Glentoran and Shelbourne) resigned from the IFA and formed a "New Irish Football Association" and a New Irish Cup. Linfield remained a member of the original IFA and were declared winners of the unfinished Irish Cup, but eventually participated in the New Irish Cup under the name Belfast Blues. This arrangement only lasted for the remainder of this season and all clubs reverted to competing in the Irish Cup by the following season.

The New Irish Cup was won by Belfast Celtic, who defeated Glentoran 2–0 in the final at Grosvenor Park. The New Irish Cup later became the Gold Cup and Belfast Celtic are therefore considered the inaugural winners of the Gold Cup.

== Irish Cup ==
=== Results ===
==== First round ====
Team 1	Score	Team 2
Barn	not played	Belfast Celtic II
Cliftonville Olympic	not played	Distillery II
Wandsworth	not played	Glentoran II
Linfield Swifts	not played	Larne
Glenavon Reserves	not played	Portadown Celtic
St James's Gate	2–1	Dublin University
Derry Celtic Swifts	bye	

All senior Irish League sides were given a bye to the next round. Due to a dispute between junior clubs and the Irish Football Association, all clubs in this round (with the exception of St James's Gate and Dublin University) withdrew from the competition at this stage.

==== Second round ====
Team 1	Score	Team 2
Bohemians	2–3	Linfield
Glenavon	1–2	Derry Celtic
Glentoran	3–2	Distillery
Belfast Celtic	0–1	Cliftonville
Shelbourne	1–0	St James's Gate

==== Third round ====
Team 1	Score	Team 2
Glentoran	4–0	Derry Celtic

Cliftonville, Linfield and Shelbourne were given a bye into the next round.

==== Semi-finals ====
Team 1	Score	Team 2
Shelbourne	not played	Cliftonville
Linfield	not played	Glentoran

Cliftonville, Glentoran and Shelbourne resigned from the Irish Football Association due to disputes and the competition was left unfinished.

== New Irish Cup ==
1911–12 New Irish Cup
Tournament details
- Country: Ireland
- Date: 23 March 1912 – 2 April 1912
- Teams: 8

Final positions
- Champions: Belfast Celtic
- Runners-up: Glentoran

Tournament statistics
- Matches played: 7
- Goals scored: 20 (2.86 per match)

=== Results ===
==== First round ====
Team 1	Score	Team 2
Distillery	1–0	Derry Celtic
Glentoran	4–1	Shelbourne
Cliftonville	4–1	Glenavon
Belfast Celtic	1–0	Belfast Blues^{1}

^{1} Linfield were still members of the original Irish Football Association but decided to compete in the New Irish Cup. To avoid any conflicts they played under the name Belfast Blues instead of Linfield.

==== Semi-finals ====
Team 1	Score	Team 2
Belfast Celtic	2–0	Distillery
Glentoran	4–0	Cliftonville

==== Final ====
20 April 1912

Belfast Celtic	2–0	Glentoran
Buckle; Robertson	Report

Grosvenor Park, Belfast
