= 1919–20 Irish League =

Irish League
- Season: 1919–20
- Dates: 30 August 1919 – 6 December 1919
- Champions: Belfast Celtic; 3rd Irish title
- Matches played: 56
- Goals scored: 145 (2.59 per match)
- Biggest home win: Glentoran 6–0 Bohemians
- Biggest away win: Glenavon 1–7 Distillery
- Highest scoring: Distillery 7–3 Shelbourne

The 1919–20 Irish League was the 26th edition of the Irish League, the highest level of league competition in Irish football.

The league comprised eight teams and Belfast Celtic won the championship for the 3rd time.

== Season summary ==
The league championship resumed after a four-year suspension due to the First World War; during the war teams had competed locally in the Belfast & District League (between 1915–16 and 1918–19) or the Leinster Senior League. The teams that played in this season were the same teams that last competed in the 1914–15 season.

Due to the political upheaval resulting from the Irish War of Independence, Belfast Celtic, Shelbourne and Bohemians all withdrew from the league with the conclusion of this season. Shelbourne and Bohemians later joined the new League of Ireland while Belfast Celtic would return to the Irish League in 1924–25.

== Teams and locations ==
Location of teams in the 1919–20 Irish League
Location of Belfast teams in the 1919–20 Irish League season
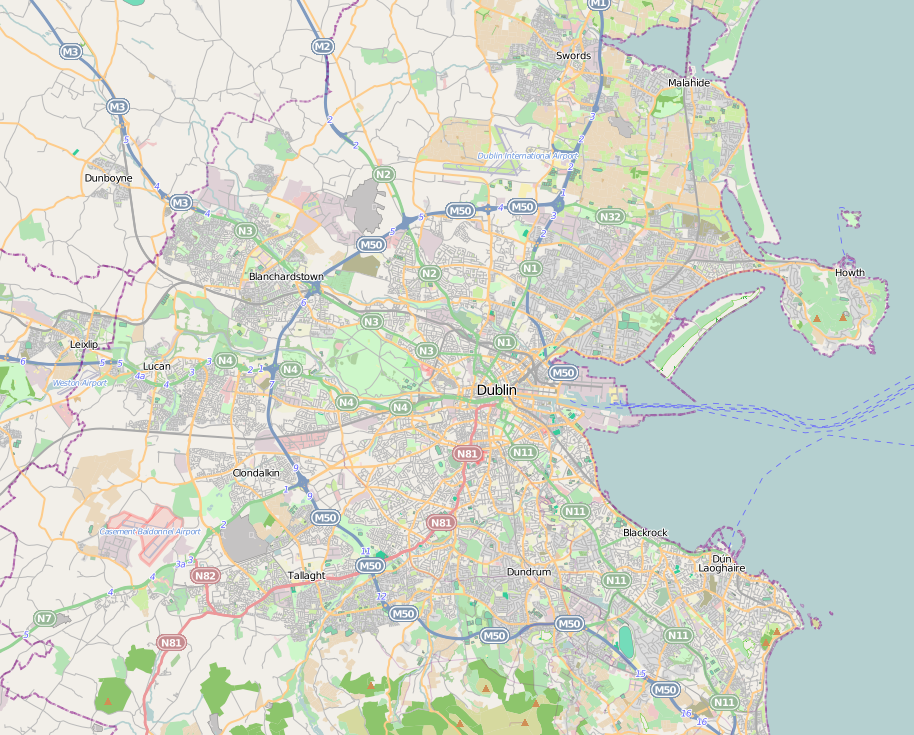
Location of Dublin teams in the 1919–20 Irish League season

Team	Town	Home Ground
Belfast Celtic	Belfast	Celtic Park
Bohemians	Dublin	Dalymount Park
Cliftonville	Belfast	Solitude
Distillery	Belfast	Grosvenor Park
Glenavon	Lurgan	Mourneview Park
Glentoran	Belfast	The Oval
Linfield	Belfast	Windsor Park
Shelbourne	Dublin	Shelbourne Park

== League standings ==
Pos	Team	Pld	W	D	L	GF	GA	GR	Pts	Result
1	Belfast Celtic (C)	14	10	3	1	27	6	4.500	23	Champions, Withdrew
2	Distillery	14	7	6	1	26	9	2.889	20	
3	Glentoran	14	8	3	3	29	10	2.900	19	
4	Shelbourne	14	3	7	4	16	21	0.762	13	Withdrew
5	Linfield	14	4	4	6	8	11	0.727	12	
6	Glenavon	14	3	4	7	21	28	0.750	10	
7	Cliftonville	14	2	5	7	11	22	0.500	9	
8	Bohemians	14	2	2	10	7	38	0.184	6	Withdrew

Source: rsssf.com
(C) Champions

== Results ==
Home \ Away	BCE	BOH	CLI	DIS	GLV	GLT	LIN	SHE
Belfast Celtic		5–0	4–0	0–0	3–0	1–0	1–0	1–0
Bohemians	0–4		1–0	0–2	0–4	2–2	0–1	1–3
Cliftonville	1–2	2–0		0–1	0–4	0–0	0–0	2–2
Distillery	0–0	4–1	0–0		0–0	2–2	1–0	7–3
Glenavon	1–2	5–1	2–3	1–7		1–3	0–0	0–0
Glentoran	2–0	6–0	3–1	1–0	4–0		2–0	4–0
Linfield	1–3	0–1	1–1	1–2	2–0	1–0		1–0
Shelbourne	1–1	0–0	2–1	0–0	3–3	2–0	0–0	

Source: Irish League Archive
Legend: Blue = home team win; Yellow = draw; Red = away team win.
