= James Hopkins (footballer, born 1901) =

Northern Irish footballer

Personal information
- Full name: James Hopkins
- Date of birth: 12 July 1901
- Place of birth: Ballymoney, County Antrim, Ireland
- Date of death: 1943 (aged 41–42)
- Height: 5 ft 7 in (1.70 m)
- Position: Inside forward

Youth career
- Belfast United

Senior career*
Years	Team	Apps	(Gls)
1919–1923	Arsenal	21	(7)
1923–1929	Brighton & Hove Albion	220	(72)
1929–19??	Aldershot		

International career
1925	Ireland	1	(0)
- * Club domestic league appearances and goals

James Hopkins (12 July 1901 – 1943) was a Northern Irish association football player who played at inside forward.

Born in Ballymoney, he started out at Belfast United before being signed by Arsenal in 1919 at the age of 18. He was a regular for Arsenal's reserve side for two seasons before his first-team debut came, against West Bromwich Albion on 19 March 1921; Hopkins scored in a 4–3 victory and went on to play a further seven times that season. Injury and illness marred his 1921–22 season however, and he only played in 11 League games all season. The following season his appearances were even more sporadic, and despite scoring in both his League starts for Arsenal in 1922–23, he was sold to Brighton & Hove Albion in January 1923; in total he played 22 games for Arsenal, scoring seven goals.

Hopkins spent the next six seasons at Brighton, making over 200 League appearances in the Third Division South and scoring 72 goals. He also won a single cap for Ireland against England on 24 October 1925 at Windsor Park; the game finished 0–0. He left Brighton in 1929 and ended his career with Aldershot. He died in 1943.

== Sources ==
- Harris, Jeff (1995). Hogg, Tony (ed.). Arsenal Who's Who. Independent UK Sports. p. 78. ISBN 1-899429-03-4.
