= Joe Toner =

Northern Irish footballer (1894–1954)

Personal information
- Full name: Joseph Samuel Toner
- Date of birth: 30 March 1894
- Place of birth: Castlewellan, County Down, Ireland
- Date of death: 18 November 1954 (aged 60)
- Height: 5 ft 7 in (1.70 m)
- Position: Left winger

Senior career*
Years	Team	Apps	(Gls)
–1919	Belfast United		
1919–1926	Arsenal	89	(6)
1926–1927	St Johnstone	29	(2)

International career
1922–1927	Ireland	8	(0)
- * Club domestic league appearances and goals

Joseph Samuel Toner (30 March 1894 – 18 November 1954) was an Irish professional footballer. He played eight times for the Ireland national team.

== Career ==
Born in Castlewellan, County Down, Toner played for Belfast United before joining Arsenal in August 1919, making his debut for the side against Everton on 11 October 1919. An outside-left, he was a semi-regular in his first two seasons before breaking through properly in 1921–22. He won his first Ireland cap on 4 April 1922 against Wales in Belfast; the match finished 1-1. His second cap came a year later, again against Wales, this time at Wrexham.

By now he had been dropped by Arsenal; thanks to fierce competition for the outside left spot from Jimmy Paterson and Samson Haden, Toner only played eight games in total during 1922–23 and 1923–24. He became a regular again in 1924–25 before being dropped after Arsenal were given a 5–0 hiding at home to Huddersfield Town. He also won four more Ireland caps as an Arsenal player, before leaving to join St Johnstone in January 1926 after new Arsenal manager Herbert Chapman decided Toner wasn't part of his plans. In total he played exactly 100 times for Arsenal (89 in the league and 11 in the FA Cup), scoring six goals (all of them in the league).

After moving to Scotland, he won two further Ireland caps while with St Johnstone (the first player to represent the Perth club internationally), playing in the Home International games against England and Scotland in 1927. A broken leg forced him to retire, but he subsequently returned to Ireland and became a coach Coleraine, and on one occasion came out retirement to deputise in the side.

Toner also played hurling for his county and Gaelic football for Castlewellan GAC.
