= Belfast United F.C. =

- Full name: Belfast United Football Club
- Nicknames: United, the Ulsterites
- Founded: 1915
- Dissolved: 1927
- Ground: Ulster Cricket Ground
- Manager: Jimmie Magowan
- League: Belfast and District League
Home colours

Belfast United Football Club was an Irish football club which played competitive football during the First World War.

== History ==
The Irish League went into abeyance after the 1914–15 season, owing to the First World War. In order to keep the game going, five of the Belfast clubs agreed to form an unofficial continuation, the Belfast & District League; one club, Belfast Celtic, refused to join, on the basis that the competition was to be on a professional rather than an amateur basis. With an uneven number of clubs, one side would be without a game each weekend, which provided the impetus for the formation of a new club, Belfast United, under the management of Jimmie Magowan, Belfast Celtic's coach.

The club's first game was a 1–1 draw at Distillery on 18 September 1915. Despite the alleged interest in the club, it did not attract fans, given the existing loyalties within the city, and, as Belfast Celtic had continued playing in the Irish Intermediate League, United did not pick up its supporters. United's first win, over Glenavon in October 1915, was only seen by a "meagre" crowd. It was also handicapped by not having its own home ground for its first two seasons.

After finishing winless in 1916–17, the club found a ground in Ballynafeigh. This did at least help with the team rising from the foot of the table, and in 1917–18 it had its only victories in the Irish Cup, reaching the semi-final. In the last four United lost 2–1 at Grosvenor Park to Belfast Celtic; the winner came with 10 minutes to go, although McDaid for United also saved a penalty almost straight from the kick-off. The club had also played in the Gold Cup (played to a league structure) from 1915 to 1916, but again without success, its first match win not coming until its twelfth game in the competition, 1–0 against Cliftonville in March 1918.

United finished the 1918–19 season £200 in debt, and, with Belfast Celtic not only returning to senior football, but winning the District League title, United's application to join the revived Irish League was considered redundant - only the clubs playing in the League in 1914 were admitted to its reincarnation in 1919. The club sold two players to Arsenal to clear the debt, and continued to field its second XI at Ballynafeigh in the Intermediate League for the 1919–20 season, with the aim of keeping a first XI to play friendly matches and in Cup competitions.

Such a business model did not prove productive, and the last appearance of the senior XI was in a 2–1 defeat at Glentoran in the first round of the 1920–21 Irish Cup; it took a late Scraggs penalty to put the Glens through, and they went on to win the trophy. The second XI in effect became the first XI, and continued to play Intermediate League football until 1926–27; that season, the club finished bottom, with 4 wins and 26 defeats in 30 matches, and was relegated to the second division. In a bid to avoid disaster, United made a quixotic application to join the Irish League instead, which was admitting two new members. The club lost in the vote to Coleraine and Bangor. Following that rejection, the club disappears from the record.

== Colours ==
The club wore broad black and white striped shirts, black shorts, and black socks.

== Ground ==
The club originally did not have a permanent home ground; in the 1915–16 season, it played every match at its opponent's ground, other than the two matches against Glenavon, which were played at The Oval and at Distillery's Grosvenor Park. This was due to Glenavon having to play all of its wartime fixtures in Belfast.

From August 1917, the club rented the Ulster Cricket Ground at Ballynafeigh. As part of the deal, the intermediate side Ulster United became the Belfast United reserve side. It sought a new ground in Ballymacarrett at the close of the season, but was unable to find one, so returned to Ballynafeigh for the 1918–19 season. However, in February 1918 United gave up its lease because of the state of the pitch and played all senior matches away from home; this did not affect its reserve XI.

== Notable players ==
- Joe Toner and James Hopkins, sold to Arsenal in 1919 for £150 and £50 respectively, and who both went on to win Ireland caps
- Billy McDevitt, winger, who signed for Swansea Town from United in 1921
