= 1944–45 Northern Regional League =

Irish League
- Season: 1944–45
- Champions: Linfield
- Matches played: 60
- Goals scored: 298 (4.97 per match)

The Irish League in season 1944–45 was suspended due to the Second World War. A Northern Regional League was played instead by 6 teams, and Linfield won the championship.

== League standings ==
Pos	Team	Pld	W	D	L	GF	GA	GR	Pts	Result
1	Linfield (C)	20	15	4	1	81	24	3.375	34	Champions
2	Belfast Celtic	20	13	5	2	54	27	2.000	31	
3	Derry City	20	8	3	9	41	53	0.774	19	
4	Distillery	20	8	1	11	44	58	0.759	17	
5	Glentoran	20	7	1	12	55	67	0.821	15	
6	Cliftonville	20	2	0	18	23	69	0.333	4	

Source: Irish League Archive
(C) Champions
