= 1910–11 Irish League =

Irish League
- Season: 1910–11
- Dates: 3 September 1910 – 23 January 1911
- Champions: Linfield; 11th Irish title
- Relegated: Bohemians
- Matches played: 56
- Goals scored: 168 (3 per match)
- Biggest home win: Glentoran 9–0 Derry Celtic
- Biggest away win: Cliftonville 1–4 Glentoran; Shelbourne 0–3 Linfield
- Highest scoring: Glentoran 9–0 Derry Celtic

The 1910–11 Irish League was the 21st edition of the Irish League, the highest level of league competition in Irish football.

The league comprised eight teams, and Linfield won the championship after a play-off match with Glentoran which finished 3–2.

== Teams and locations ==
Location of teams in the 1910–11 Irish League season
Location of Belfast teams in the 1910–11 Irish League season
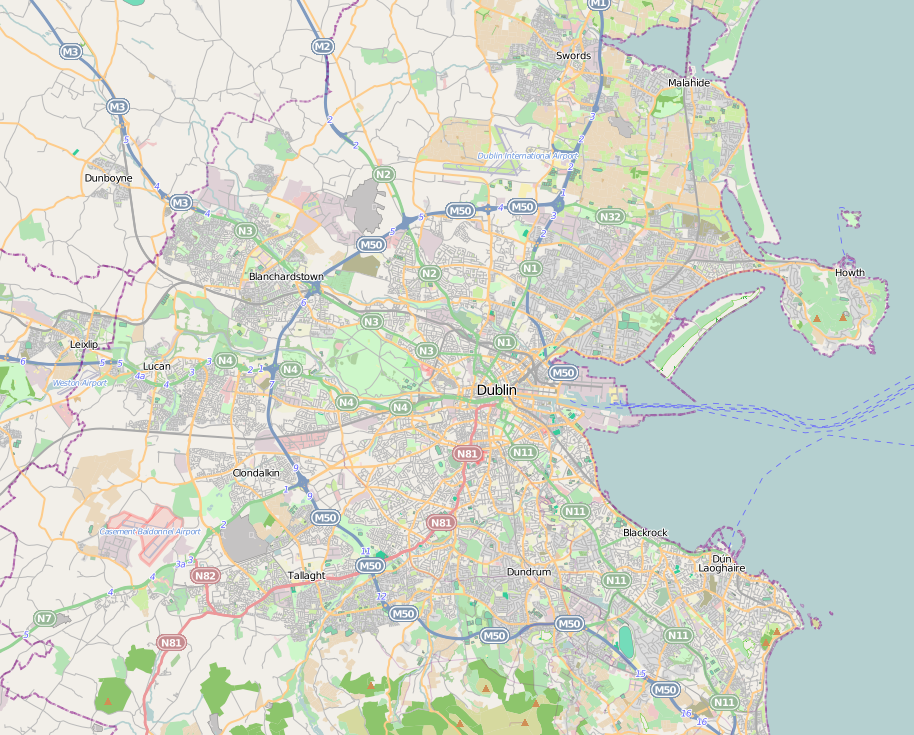
Location of Dublin teams in the 1910–11 Irish League

Team	Town	Home Ground
Belfast Celtic	Belfast	Celtic Park
Bohemians	Dublin	Dalymount Park
Cliftonville	Belfast	Solitude
Derry Celtic	Derry	Brandywell
Distillery	Belfast	Grosvenor Park
Glentoran	Belfast	The Oval
Linfield	Belfast	Windsor Park
Shelbourne	Dublin	Sandymount Road

== League standings ==
Pos	Team	Pld	W	D	L	GF	GA	GR	Pts	Result
1	Linfield (C)	14	9	4	1	29	11	2.636	22	Champions
2	Glentoran	14	10	2	2	39	12	3.250	22	
3	Belfast Celtic	14	5	5	4	21	19	1.105	15	
4	Cliftonville	14	5	4	5	16	22	0.727	14	
5	Derry Celtic	14	5	4	5	21	29	0.724	14	
6	Shelbourne	14	3	4	7	15	31	0.484	10	
7	Distillery	14	2	5	7	13	19	0.684	9	
8	Bohemians (R)	14	1	4	9	14	25	0.560	6	Withdrew

Source: rsssf.com
(C) Champions; (R) Relegated

== Results ==
=== League ===
Home \ Away	BCE	BOH	CLI	DCE	DIS	GLT	LIN	SHE
Belfast Celtic		3–3	3–0	2–1	0–0	1–3	0–1	3–2
Bohemians	1–3		1–1	4–0	0–2	0–1	0–2	2–2
Cliftonville	1–1	1–0		1–0	2–0	1–4	0–1	4–1
Derry Celtic	2–1	2–1	3–3		1–0	3–1	2–2	5–2
Distillery	1–1	5–2	1–1	0–0		1–2	0–1	0–1
Glentoran	1–2	2–0	4–0	9–0	2–1		3–0	4–0
Linfield	1–1	1–0	3–0	2–2	4–0	2–2		6–1
Shelbourne	2–0	0–0	0–1	1–0	2–2	1–1	0–3	

Source: Irish League Archive
Legend: Blue = home team win; Yellow = draw; Red = away team win.

=== Test match ===
23 January 1911

Linfield	3–2	Glentoran
Dodds; Thompson	Report	McKnight; Hunter

Solitude, Belfast
Attendance: 10,000
Referee: T. Robertson (Glasgow)
