= 1913–14 Irish League =

Irish League
- Season: 1913–14
- Dates: 6 September 1913 – 25 December 1913
- Champions: Linfield; 12th Irish title
- Matches played: 56
- Goals scored: 159 (2.84 per match)
- Biggest home win: Cliftonville 6–2 Glentoran; Glentoran 4–0 Belfast Celtic; Glentoran 5–1 Bohemians; Linfield 5–1 Glenavon
- Biggest away win: Bohemians 2–5 Glentoran; Cliftonville 0–3 Glentoran; Cliftonville 0–3 Linfield; Cliftonville 0–3 Shelbourne
- Highest scoring: Bohemians 4–5 Belfast Celtic

The 1913–14 Irish League was the 24th edition of the Irish League, the highest level of league competition in Irish football.

The league comprised eight teams, and Linfield won the championship for the 12th time.

== Season summary ==
For this season the number of competing clubs dropped to eight due to the withdrawal of Derry Celtic (who had played continuously in the league since 1900) and Tritonville (who withdrew after one season).

== Teams and locations ==
Location of teams in the 1913–14 Irish League
Location of Belfast teams in the 1913–14 Irish League season
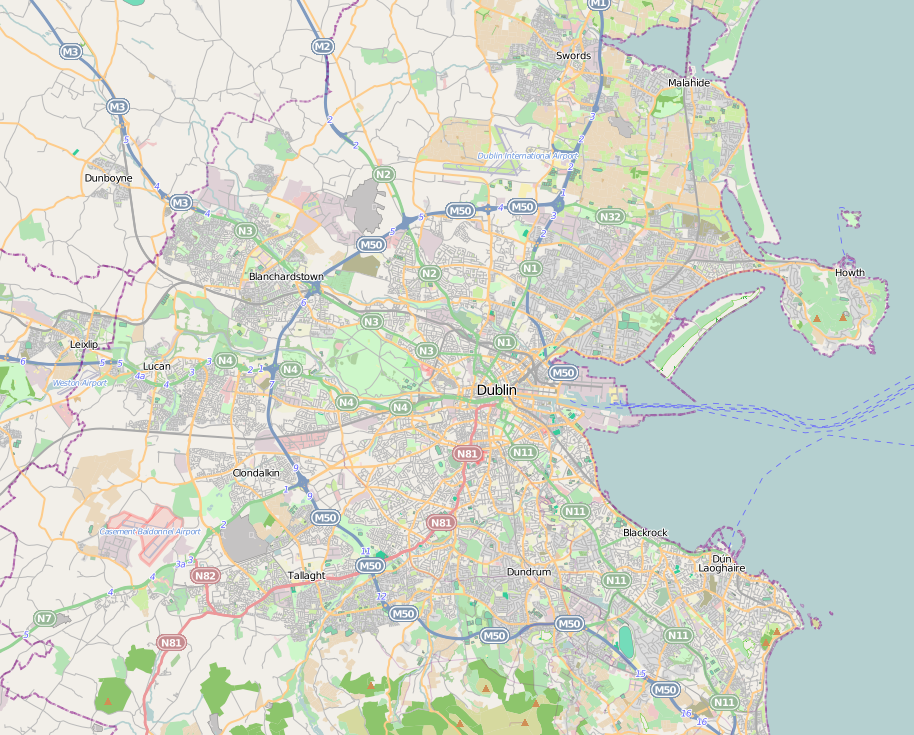
Location of Dublin teams in the 1913–14 Irish League season

Team	Town	Home Ground
Belfast Celtic	Belfast	Celtic Park
Bohemians	Dublin	Dalymount Park
Cliftonville	Belfast	Solitude
Distillery	Belfast	Grosvenor Park
Glenavon	Lurgan	Mourneview Park
Glentoran	Belfast	The Oval
Linfield	Belfast	Windsor Park
Shelbourne	Dublin	Shelbourne Park

== League standings ==
Pos	Team	Pld	W	D	L	GF	GA	GR	Pts	Result
1	Linfield (C)	14	11	2	1	32	13	2.462	24	Champions
2	Glentoran	14	8	3	3	32	18	1.778	19	
3	Belfast Celtic	14	8	1	5	19	18	1.056	17	
4	Distillery	14	6	4	4	14	12	1.167	16	
5	Shelbourne	14	6	2	6	16	10	1.600	14	
6	Glenavon	14	4	2	8	12	23	0.522	10	
7	Bohemians	14	2	2	10	19	36	0.528	6	
8	Cliftonville	14	3	0	11	15	29	0.517	6	

Source: rsssf.com
(C) Champions

== Results ==
Home \ Away	BCE	BOH	CLI	DIS	GLV	GLT	LIN	SHE
Belfast Celtic		4–1	1–0	2–1	2–0	1–0	1–2	1–0
Bohemians	4–5		2–3	0–0	2–1	2–5	3–1	0–1
Cliftonville	0–1	4–2		0–1	6–2	0–3	0–3	0–3
Distillery	1–0	3–1	3–1		1–0	0–0	1–3	1–0
Glenavon	0–0	1–0	1–0	2–1		2–3	1–1	1–0
Glentoran	4–0	5–1	3–1	0–0	1–0		2–2	3–2
Linfield	2–1	3–1	2–0	2–0	5–1	4–2		1–0
Shelbourne	3–0	0–0	2–0	1–1	1–0	3–1	0–1	

Source: Irish League Archive
Legend: Blue = home team win; Yellow = draw; Red = away team win.
