= 1916–17 Belfast & District League =

Belfast & District League
- Season: 1916–17
- Dates: 9 September 1916 – 18 November 1916
- Champions: Glentoran
- Matches played: 30
- Goals scored: 99 (3.3 per match)
- Biggest home win: Glentoran 4–0 Linfield
- Biggest away win: Glenavon 0–5 Linfield
- Highest scoring: Distillery 5–3 Glenavon

The Irish League in season 1916–17 was suspended due to the First World War. A Belfast & District League was played instead by 6 teams, and Glentoran won the championship.

== Teams and locations ==
Location of Belfast teams in the 1916–17 Belfast & District League season; all matches were played in Belfast

Team	Town	Home Ground
Belfast United	No home ground	
Cliftonville	Belfast	Solitude
Distillery	Belfast	Grosvenor Park
Glenavon	No home ground	
Glentoran	Belfast	The Oval
Linfield	Belfast	Windsor Park

== League standings ==
Pos	Team	Pld	W	D	L	GF	GA	GR	Pts	Result
1	Glentoran (C)	10	7	3	0	28	16	1.750	17	Champions
2	Distillery	10	5	4	1	23	14	1.643	14	
3	Linfield	10	5	3	2	19	12	1.583	13	
4	Cliftonville	10	3	3	4	9	10	0.900	9	
5	Glenavon	10	1	2	7	13	28	0.464	4	
6	Belfast United	10	0	3	7	7	19	0.368	3	

Source: rsssf.com
(C) Champions

== Results ==
Home \ Away	BEL	CLI	DIS	GLV	GLT	LIN
Belfast United		0–1	1–1	1–1	1–3	0–3
Cliftonville	3–0		0–1	3–2	0–2	1–1
Distillery	1–1	1–0		5–3	3–3	1–1
Glenavon	1–0	0–0	1–5		2–3	0–5
Glentoran	2–1	1–1	4–3	4–3		4–0
Linfield	3–2	2–0	0–2	2–0	2–2	

Source: Irish League Archive
Legend: Blue = home team win; Yellow = draw; Red = away team win.
