= 1945–46 Northern Regional League =

Irish League
- Season: 1945–46
- Champions: Linfield
- Matches played: 60
- Goals scored: 302 (5.03 per match)

The Irish League in season 1945–46 was suspended due to the Second World War. A Northern Regional League was played instead by 6 teams, and Linfield won the championship.

== League standings ==
Pos	Team	Pld	W	D	L	GF	GA	GR	Pts	Result
1	Linfield (C)	20	17	0	3	79	27	2.926	34	Champions
2	Belfast Celtic	20	14	4	2	58	20	2.900	32	
3	Distillery	20	7	5	8	47	52	0.904	19	
4	Glentoran	20	5	6	9	46	58	0.793	16	
5	Derry City	20	5	1	14	48	72	0.667	11	
6	Cliftonville	20	2	4	14	24	73	0.329	8	

Source: Irish League Archive
(C) Champions
