= Reg Boreham =

English footballer

Personal information
- Full name: Reginald Walter Boreham
- Date of birth: 27 May 1896
- Place of birth: High Wycombe, England
- Date of death: 13 February 1976 (aged 79)
- Position: Inside forward

Senior career*
Years	Team	Apps	(Gls)
1919–1920	Wycombe Wanderers	14	(22)
1920	Notts County	3	(0)
1920–1922	Wycombe Wanderers	29	(36)
1921–1924	Arsenal	51	(18)
1924-1927	Wycombe Wanderers	68	(41)
1927	Maidenhead United		
Total		165	(117)
- * Club domestic league appearances and goals

Reginald Walter Boreham (27 May 1896 – 13 February 1976) was an English footballer who played in the Football League for Arsenal and Notts County.
