= 1920–21 Irish Cup =

Tournament details
- Country: Ireland
- Date: 29 January 1921 – 26 March 1921
- Teams: 12

Final positions
- Champions: Glentoran (3rd win)
- Runners-up: Glenavon

Tournament statistics
- Matches played: 13
- Goals scored: 26 (2 per match)

The 1920–21 Irish Cup was the 41st edition of the Irish Cup, the premier knock-out cup competition in Irish football.

Glentoran won the tournament for the 3rd time, defeating Glenavon 2–0 in the final at Windsor Park. This was the final tournament organised on an all-Ireland basis as the partition of Ireland process began in May 1921, and the FAI Cup was subsequently founded as an equivalent cup competition for teams in Southern Ireland (present-day Republic of Ireland).

== Results ==
=== First round ===
Team 1	Score	Team 2
Bohemians	0–0	Shelbourne
Distillery	0–1	Forth River
Glentoran	2–1	Belfast United
Linfield	2–0	Cliftonville
Queen's Island	1–2	Brantwood
Glenavon	bye	
St James's Gate	bye	

==== Replay ====
Team 1	Score	Team 2
Shelbourne	0–1	Bohemians

=== Quarter-finals ===
Team 1	Score	Team 2
Glenavon	1–0	Linfield
Glentoran	2–1	Forth River
Shelbourne	0–0	St James's Gate
Brantwood	bye	

==== Replay ====
Team 1	Score	Team 2
St James's Gate	1–2	Shelbourne

=== Semi-finals ===
Team 1	Score	Team 2
Glentoran	4–3	Brantwood
Glenavon	0–0^{1}	Shelbourne

^{1}Glenavon advanced into the final after Shelbourne refused to play on 17 March which was set as the semi-final replay date following the IFA decision that the replay, like the original game would be played in Belfast.

=== Final ===
26 March 1921

Glentoran	2–0	Glenavon
Crooks; Snape	Report

Windsor Park, Belfast
Referee: J. Sanderson
