= 1942–43 Northern Regional League =

Irish League
- Season: 1942–43
- Champions: Linfield
- Matches played: 60
- Goals scored: 259 (4.32 per match)

The Irish League in season 1942–43 was suspended due to the Second World War. A Northern Regional League was played instead by 6 teams, and Linfield won the championship.

== League standings ==
Pos	Team	Pld	W	D	L	GF	GA	GR	Pts	Result
1	Linfield (C)	20	14	2	4	55	26	2.115	30	Champions
2	Belfast Celtic	20	13	3	4	50	22	2.273	29	
3	Distillery	20	10	2	8	42	34	1.235	22	
4	Glentoran	20	7	2	11	54	56	0.964	16	
5	Derry City	20	6	3	11	32	51	0.627	15	
6	Cliftonville	20	3	2	15	26	70	0.371	8	

Source: Irish League Archive
(C) Champions
