= 1905–06 Irish League =

Irish League
- Season: 1905–06
- Dates: 2 September 1905 – 30 May 1906
- Champions: Cliftonville (1st Irish title); Distillery (5th Irish title)
- Matches played: 56
- Goals scored: 139 (2.48 per match)
- Biggest home win: Cliftonville 5–1 Glentoran; Distillery 5–1 Derry Celtic
- Biggest away win: Derry Celtic 0–4 Bohemians
- Highest scoring: Cliftonville 5–1 Glentoran; Distillery 5–1 Derry Celtic

The 1905–06 Irish League was the 16th edition of the Irish League, the highest level of league competition in Irish football.

The league comprised eight teams, and Cliftonville and Distillery shared the championship after two drawn play-off matches could not separate the sides. Cliftonville won their 1st league title while Distillery won their 5th.

== Season summary ==
Cliftonville and Distillery finished the league level with 19 points. The first playoff 26 May 1906 to decide the title was a 0–0 draw, and the replayed match on 30 May was a 2–2 draw. In June 1906, the League determined that rather than replay again, Cliftonville and Distillery would be joint holders of the league title.

== Teams and locations ==
Location of teams in the 1905–06 Irish League season
Location of Belfast teams in the 1905–06 Irish League season
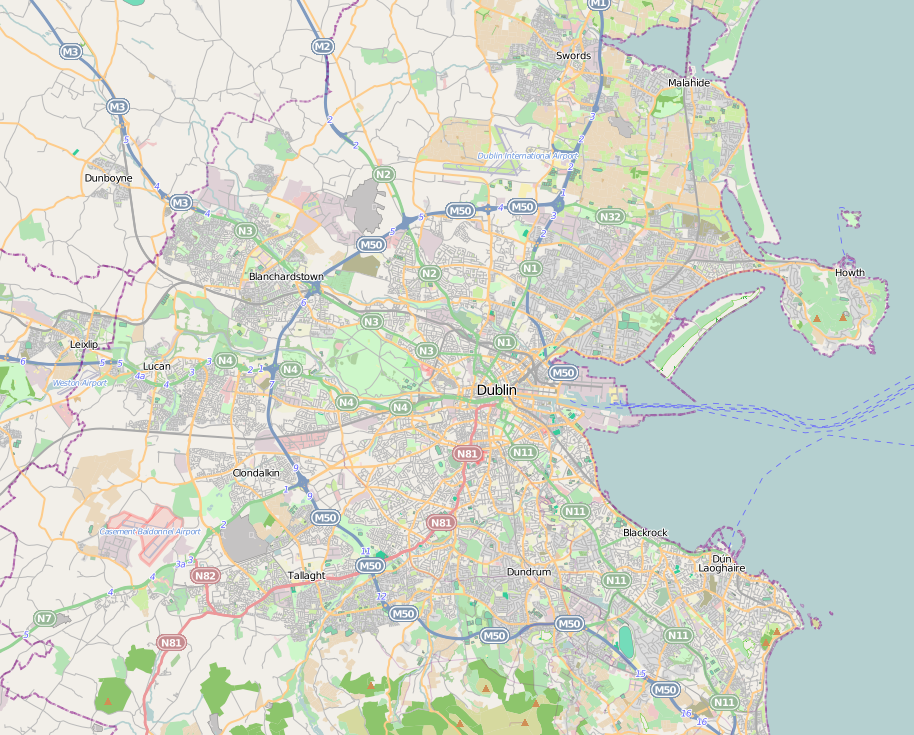
Location of Dublin teams in the 1905–06 Irish League

Team	Town	Home Ground
Belfast Celtic	Belfast	Celtic Park
Bohemians	Dublin	Dalymount Park
Cliftonville	Belfast	Solitude
Derry Celtic	Derry	Brandywell
Distillery	Belfast	Grosvenor Park
Glentoran	Belfast	The Oval
Linfield	Belfast	Windsor Park
Shelbourne	Dublin	Dalymount Park

== League standings ==
Pos	Team	Pld	W	D	L	GF	GA	GR	Pts	Result
1=	Cliftonville (C)	14	7	5	2	19	8	2.375	19	Champions
1=	Distillery (C)	14	8	3	3	20	13	1.538	19	Champions
3	Linfield	14	7	3	4	21	14	1.500	17	
4	Belfast Celtic	14	6	3	5	20	18	1.111	15	
5	Bohemians	14	5	2	7	17	20	0.850	12	
6	Shelbourne	14	5	2	7	16	18	0.889	12	
7	Derry Celtic	14	4	3	7	13	22	0.591	11	
8	Glentoran	14	2	3	9	13	26	0.500	7	

Source: rsssf.com
(C) Champions

== Results ==
=== League ===
Home \ Away	BCE	BOH	CLI	DCE	DIS	GLT	LIN	SHE
Belfast Celtic		2–1	1–1	3–1	2–2	3–0	1–3	2–3
Bohemians	1–2		2–0	1–1	1–2	3–2	1–0	2–0
Cliftonville	1–0	3–0		2–0	0–1	5–1	2–2	1–0
Derry Celtic	0–1	0–4	0–0		1–0	3–1	3–1	3–0
Distillery	1–0	3–1	0–0	5–1		1–0	2–2	1–0
Glentoran	1–2	0–0	1–1	1–0	1–2		1–2	3–2
Linfield	0–0	3–0	0–1	3–0	2–0	1–0		1–0
Shelbourne	3–1	2–0	0–2	0–0	2–0	1–1	3–1	

Source: Irish League Archive
Legend: Blue = home team win; Yellow = draw; Red = away team win.

=== Test match ===
26 May 1906

Cliftonville	0–0	Distillery
	Report

Windsor Park, Belfast
Referee: C. Case (Birkenhead)

=== Replay ===
30 May 1906

Cliftonville	2–2	Distillery
Waddell; Robertson	Report	Donnelly; McAlpine

Grosvenor Park, Belfast
Referee: Mr Deans (Dalkeith)
