= 1946–47 Northern Regional League =

Irish League
- Season: 1946–47
- Champions: Belfast Celtic
- Matches played: 112
- Goals scored: 545 (4.87 per match)

The Irish League in season 1946–47 was suspended due to the Second World War. A Northern Regional League was played instead by 8 teams, and Belfast Celtic won the championship.

== League standings ==
Pos	Team	Pld	W	D	L	GF	GA	GR	Pts	Result
1	Belfast Celtic (C)	28	21	2	5	95	40	2.375	44	Champions
2	Glentoran	28	20	2	6	93	46	2.022	42	
3	Linfield	28	20	1	7	93	45	2.067	41	
4	Coleraine	28	10	5	13	54	75	0.720	25	
5	Ballymena United	28	8	7	13	52	76	0.684	23	
6	Distillery	28	9	2	17	59	69	0.855	20	
7	Derry City	28	9	2	17	53	80	0.663	20	
8	Cliftonville	28	3	3	22	46	114	0.404	9	

Source: Irish League Archive
(C) Champions
