= 1940–41 Northern Regional League =

Irish League
- Season: 1940–41
- Champions: Belfast Celtic
- Matches played: 108
- Goals scored: 567 (5.25 per match)

The Irish League in season 1940–41 was suspended due to the Second World War. A Northern Regional League was played instead by 8 teams, and Belfast Celtic won the championship.

== League standings ==
Pos	Team	Pld	W	D	L	GF	GA	GR	Pts	Result
1	Belfast Celtic (C)	27	19	4	4	104	32	3.250	42	Champions
2	Portadown	27	17	4	6	92	58	1.586	38	
3	Glentoran	28	16	5	7	99	57	1.737	37	
4	Linfield	27	14	4	9	67	51	1.314	32	
5	Distillery	28	13	5	10	77	57	1.351	31	
6	Derry City	28	8	3	17	48	100	0.480	19	
7	Glenavon	27	6	4	17	40	95	0.421	16	
8	Cliftonville	28	2	1	25	40	117	0.342	5	

Source: Irish League Archive
(C) Champions
- Belfast Celtic v Portadown & Glenavon v Linfield fixtures left unplayed.
