= 1943–44 Northern Regional League =

Irish League
- Season: 1943–44
- Champions: Belfast Celtic
- Matches played: 58
- Goals scored: 277 (4.78 per match)

The Irish League in season 1943–44 was suspended due to the Second World War. A Northern Regional League was played instead by 6 teams, and Belfast Celtic won the championship.

== League standings ==
Pos	Team	Pld	W	D	L	GF	GA	GR	Pts	Result
1	Belfast Celtic (C)	19	12	5	2	55	21	2.619	29	Champions
2	Linfield	18	11	3	4	57	38	1.500	25	
3	Distillery	20	10	3	7	52	47	1.106	23	
4	Glentoran	20	8	1	11	49	50	0.980	17	
5	Cliftonville	20	5	1	14	29	51	0.569	11	
6	Derry City	19	5	1	13	35	70	0.500	11	

Source: Irish League Archive
(C) Champions
- Linfield v Belfast Celtic and Derry City v Linfield matches were not played due to disputes over scheduling.
