= 1935–36 Irish League =

Football league season

Irish League
- Season: 1935–36
- Champions: Belfast Celtic; 9th Irish title
- Matches: 182
- Goals: 748 (4.11 per match)

Location of teams in the Irish League from 1934–40
Location of Belfast-based teams in the Irish League from 1934–40

The 1935–36 Irish League was the 42nd edition of the Irish League, the highest level of league competition in Northern Irish football. The league comprised 14 teams, and Belfast Celtic won the championship.

== League standings ==
Pos	Team	Pld	W	D	L	GF	GA	GR	Pts	Result
1	Belfast Celtic (C)	26	20	3	3	66	23	2.870	43	Champions
2	Derry City	26	18	5	3	71	36	1.972	41	
3	Linfield	26	17	4	5	72	28	2.571	38	
4	Newry Town	26	14	5	7	80	50	1.600	33	
5	Glentoran	26	12	3	11	57	50	1.140	27	
6	Distillery	26	11	5	10	51	52	0.981	27	
7	Larne	26	11	4	11	49	65	0.754	26	
8	Portadown	26	9	5	12	53	58	0.914	23	
9	Cliftonville	26	9	5	12	49	61	0.803	23	
10	Ballymena United	26	7	5	14	41	59	0.695	19	
11	Bangor	26	8	3	15	47	72	0.653	19	
12	Glenavon	26	6	5	15	40	56	0.714	17	
13	Coleraine	26	5	5	16	28	44	0.636	15	
14	Ards	26	5	3	18	44	94	0.468	13	

Source: rsssf.com
(C) Champions

== Results ==
Home \ Away	ARD	BAN	BLM	BCE	CLI	COL	DER	DIS	GLV	GLT	LAR	LIN	NEW	POR
Ards		5–1	1–5	0–3	2–3	2–1	0–2	2–7	3–1	2–1	3–3	0–4	2–3	2–2
Bangor	0–3		2–1	1–3	1–2	1–2	1–1	1–2	2–1	3–2	0–2	1–1	2–2	8–2
Ballymena United	1–1	4–3		1–3	2–1	1–0	2–2	1–0	2–1	2–4	3–2	1–1	2–3	2–2
Belfast Celtic	2–1	4–1	2–0		4–2	1–0	2–6	2–0	2–0	4–0	9–1	2–1	5–1	2–0
Cliftonville	6–0	2–1	5–4	0–4		0–1	2–4	0–0	3–3	2–4	0–0	1–7	5–1	2–0
Coleraine	6–0	2–3	1–0	0–2	0–0		2–4	0–0	2–2	0–1	0–0	0–2	1–2	2–4
Derry City	8–1	5–0	1–0	0–0	4–0	1–1		6–0	4–2	3–0	2–1	2–0	2–1	1–0
Distillery	4–0	0–3	1–0	0–1	4–2	3–2	3–2		5–2	4–2	6–0	2–2	2–1	3–5
Glenavon	3–1	3–4	2–0	0–4	4–1	1–0	1–1	1–1		1–2	0–4	0–3	0–2	0–1
Glentoran	9–6	1–2	2–2	0–1	1–3	4–0	2–3	1–1	1–0		6–0	1–2	2–5	1–1
Larne	3–2	3–2	3–1	3–0	4–1	4–1	2–4	4–1	1–6	1–2		2–1	2–2	1–0
Linfield	5–1	7–0	3–2	2–2	2–1	3–0	8–1	4–1	2–0	0–1	2–1		4–3	2–0
Newry Town	7–1	8–1	5–1	2–2	2–3	2–1	4–0	6–1	3–3	2–3	5–0	2–1		4–2
Portadown	4–3	4–3	8–1	1–0	2–2	1–3	1–2	2–0	2–3	0–4	6–2	1–3	2–2	

Source: Irish League Archive
Legend: Blue = home team win; Yellow = draw; Red = away team win.
