= 1914–15 Irish League =

Irish League
- Season: 1914–15
- Dates: 5 September 1914 – 12 December 1914
- Champions: Belfast Celtic; 2nd Irish title
- Matches played: 56
- Goals scored: 165 (2.95 per match)
- Biggest home win: Glenavon 6–0 Bohemians
- Biggest away win: Bohemians 0–3 Belfast Celtic; Bohemians 2–5 Glentoran; Bohemians 0–3 Linfield; Bohemians 0–3 Shelbourne; Glenavon 0–3 Distillery
- Highest scoring: Bohemians 2–5 Glentoran; Glentoran 5–2 Bohemians

The 1914–15 Irish League was the 25th edition of the Irish League, the highest level of league competition in Irish football.

The league comprised eight teams, and Belfast Celtic won the championship for the 2nd time.

This was the final league season before World War I. The league would not be officially played again until the 1919–20 season.

== Teams and locations ==
Location of teams in the 1914–15 Irish League
Location of Belfast teams in the 1914–15 Irish League season
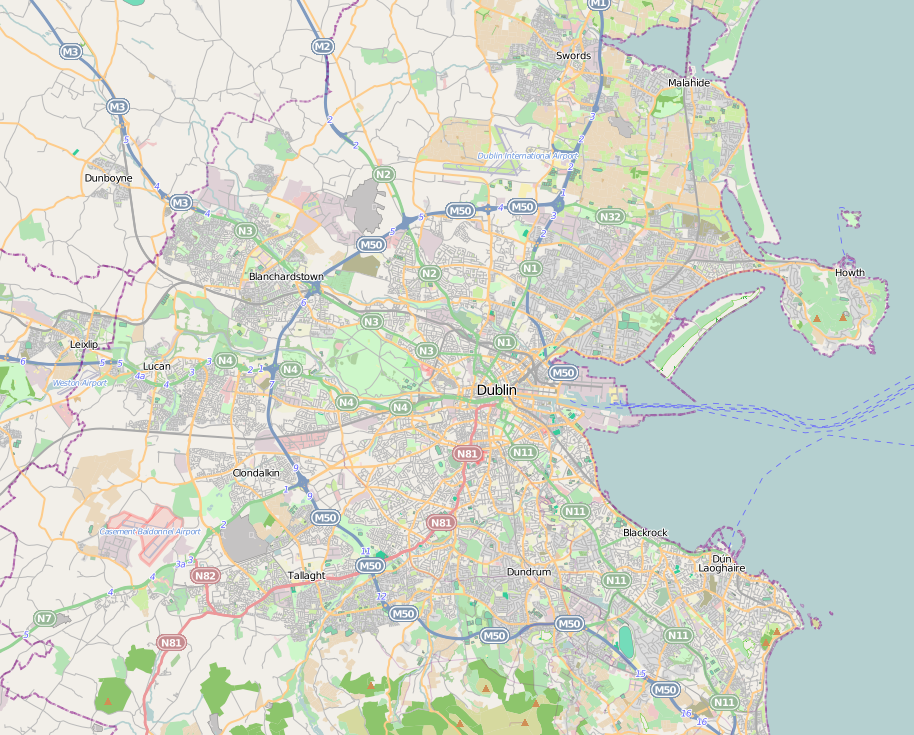
Location of Dublin teams in the 1914–15 Irish League season

Team	Town	Home Ground
Belfast Celtic	Belfast	Celtic Park
Bohemians	Dublin	Dalymount Park
Cliftonville	Belfast	Solitude
Distillery	Belfast	Grosvenor Park
Glenavon	Lurgan	Mourneview Park
Glentoran	Belfast	The Oval
Linfield	Belfast	Windsor Park
Shelbourne	Dublin	Shelbourne Park

== League standings ==
Pos	Team	Pld	W	D	L	GF	GA	GR	Pts	Result
1	Belfast Celtic (C)	14	10	3	1	24	7	3.429	23	Champions
2	Glentoran	14	9	3	2	27	10	2.700	21	
3	Linfield	14	6	5	3	27	18	1.500	17	
4	Distillery	14	7	1	6	23	16	1.438	15	
5	Shelbourne	14	6	3	5	17	12	1.417	15	
6	Glenavon	14	3	5	6	24	28	0.857	11	
7	Cliftonville	14	4	1	9	13	29	0.448	9	
8	Bohemians	14	0	1	13	10	45	0.222	1	

Source: rsssf.com
(C) Champions

== Results ==
Home \ Away	BCE	BOH	CLI	DIS	GLV	GLT	LIN	SHE
Belfast Celtic		1–1	5–0	1–0	3–0	2–1	1–0	1–0
Bohemians	0–3		1–2	2–3	2–4	2–5	0–3	0–3
Cliftonville	1–3	2–0		0–1	3–1	1–2	0–3	1–3
Distillery	0–1	3–0	4–0		4–2	0–0	1–2	0–1
Glenavon	2–2	6–0	1–1	0–3		5–1	0–0	0–0
Glentoran	0–0	5–2	3–0	3–0	1–1		3–0	2–2
Linfield	2–0	3–0	2–0	4–3	5–0	1–1		1–0
Shelbourne	0–1	2–0	0–2	0–1	3–2	2–0	1–1	

Source: Irish League Archive
Legend: Blue = home team win; Yellow = draw; Red = away team win.
