= Malcolm Brodie (journalist) =

Scottish-born journalist (1926–2013)

- Born: 27 September 1926; Glasgow, Scotland
- Died: 29 January 2013 (aged 86); Belfast, Northern Ireland
- Occupation: Journalist
- Awards: MBE

Malcolm Brodie MBE, (27 September 1926 – 29 January 2013) was a Scottish-born journalist.

== Career ==
Brodie spent his working life in Northern Ireland, after being evacuated to Portadown, County Armagh at the onset of World War II. He began his career at the Portadown Times before moving to the Belfast Telegraph in 1943, where, in 1950, he set up the newspaper's first sports department, with himself as editor. This was a role he held for 41 years, during which time he reported from a record 14 FIFA World Cups; a feat which was recognised by FIFA in 2004 as they awarded him the Jules Rimet award. As well as his position at the Belfast Telegraph, Brodie also wrote for the Daily Telegraph, the News of the World and the Sun. He authored several histories of Irish League clubs, a history of the Irish League itself and the official history of the Irish Football Association. Despite retiring as sports editor of the Belfast Telegraph in 1991, he continued to write a column called 'Down Memory Lane' and remained an honorary life employee of the newspaper.

== Accolades ==
Brodie received many accolades in recognition of his work, among them an honorary doctorate from the University of Ulster, induction into the Belfast Sports Hall of Fame, the inaugural Doug Gardner Memorial Award in 1990 from the Sports Journalists' Association for services to the profession and an All-Ireland Journalists' Association lifetime achievement award. He received an MBE for services to journalism in 1979.

== Death ==
Brodie died, aged 86, on 29 January 2013. His funeral was held at Cregagh Presbyterian Church, Belfast. A minute's silence, followed by a minute of applause, was held at all Irish League grounds on the weekend following his death and the Northern Ireland national team wore black armbands as a mark of respect during their next international match. It is intended that the press box at the re-developed Windsor Park will be named in his honour.
