= 1941–42 Northern Regional League =

Irish League
- Season: 1941–42
- Champions: Belfast Celtic
- Matches played: 60
- Goals scored: 273 (4.55 per match)

The Irish League in season 1941–42 was suspended due to the Second World War. A Northern Regional League was played instead by 6 teams, and Belfast Celtic won the championship.

== League standings ==
Pos	Team	Pld	W	D	L	GF	GA	GR	Pts	Result
1	Belfast Celtic (C)	20	12	6	2	57	23	2.478	30	Champions
2	Linfield	20	11	7	2	64	38	1.684	29	
3	Glentoran	20	11	3	6	59	37	1.595	25	
4	Distillery	20	6	6	8	41	38	1.079	18	
5	Derry City	20	3	5	12	23	73	0.315	11	
6	Cliftonville	20	2	3	15	29	64	0.453	7	

Source: Irish League Archive
(C) Champions
