= 1918–19 Belfast & District League =

Belfast & District League
- Season: 1918–19
- Dates: 7 September 1918 – 16 April 1919
- Champions: Belfast Celtic
- Matches played: 30
- Goals scored: 71 (2.37 per match)
- Biggest home win: Belfast Celtic 2–0 Cliftonville; Distillery 2–0 Belfast United; Glentoran 2–0 Cliftonville; Linfield 2–0 Belfast Celtic; Linfield 3–1 Belfast United
- Biggest away win: Cliftonville 0–3 Belfast Celtic
- Highest scoring: Belfast United 2–4 Distillery

The Irish League in season 1918–19 was suspended due to the First World War. A Belfast & District League was played instead by 6 teams, and Belfast Celtic won the championship after winning a play-off with Linfield 1–0.

== Teams and locations ==
Location of Belfast teams in the 1918–19 Belfast & District League season; all matches were played in Belfast

Team	Town	Home Ground
Belfast Celtic	Belfast	Celtic Park
Belfast United	Belfast	Ballynafeigh
Cliftonville	Belfast	Solitude
Distillery	Belfast	Grosvenor Park
Glentoran	Belfast	The Oval
Linfield	Belfast	Windsor Park

== League standings ==
Pos	Team	Pld	W	D	L	GF	GA	GR	Pts	Result
1	Belfast Celtic (C)	10	7	1	2	15	7	2.143	15	Champions
2	Linfield	10	7	1	2	15	8	1.875	15	
3	Glentoran	10	5	1	4	11	9	1.222	11	
4	Distillery	10	2	4	4	11	12	0.917	8	
5	Belfast United	10	2	2	6	12	19	0.632	6	
6	Cliftonville	10	1	3	6	7	16	0.438	5	

Source: rsssf.com
(C) Champions

== Results ==
=== League ===
Home \ Away	BCE	BUT	CLI	DIS	GLT	LIN
Belfast Celtic		2–1	2–0	1–0	2–1	0–1
Belfast United	2–2		2–2	2–4	2–1	1–2
Cliftonville	0–3	0–1		1–1	1–0	2–3
Distillery	0–1	2–0	1–1		0–0	0–2
Glentoran	0–2	1–0	2–0	3–2		1–0
Linfield	2–0	3–1	1–0	1–1	0–2	

Source: Irish League Archive
Legend: Blue = home team win; Yellow = draw; Red = away team win.

=== Test match ===
16 April 1919

Belfast Celtic	1–0	Linfield
McKinney	Report

Grosvenor Park, Belfast
Attendance: 14,000
Referee: W. McLean
