= Gowdy =

Gowdy is a surname. Notable people with the surname include:

- Barbara Gowdy (born 1950), Canadian novelist and short story writer
- Bill Gowdy (1903–1958), Irish association football player
- Bruce Gowdy, American guitarist
- Cornell Gowdy (born 1963), American football player
- Curt Gowdy (1919–2006), American sportscaster
- Elizabeth Gowdy Baker, born as Elizabeth Stewart Gowdy (1860–1927), American painter
- Hank Gowdy (1889–1966), American baseball player
- Joe Gowdy (fl. 1920s), Irish association football player
- John W. Gowdy (1869–1963), Scottish American Bishop of the Methodist Episcopal Church and The Methodist Church
- Kevin Gowdy (born 1997), American baseball player
- Mathilda Cajdos Gowdy (1877–1909), Hungarian-American circus performer and animal trainer
- Pete Gowdy, British singer-songwriter
- Trey Gowdy (born 1964), American attorney and former U.S. Representative from South Carolina

== See also ==
- Gowdy, Indiana, a community in the United States
- Gowdy solution
- Gowdy Field, former athletic field in Columbus, Ohio
- Curt Gowdy Media Award, an annual award given by the Basketball Hall of Fame to outstanding basketball writers and broadcasters
- Curt Gowdy State Park, state park located in Wyoming
- Elizabeth Gowdy Baker (1860–1927), American painter
- Ruth Gowdy McKinley (1931–1981), American-Canadian ceramist
- Karen Morris-Gowdy (born 1956), American actress
