= John Gough (footballer) =

Irish footballer

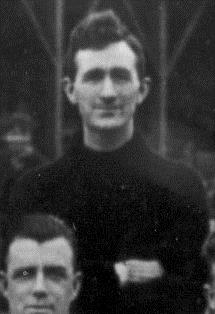
- John Gough pictured in May 1929

Personal information
- Place of birth: Belfast, Ireland
- Position: Goalkeeper

Senior career*
Years	Team	Apps	(Gls)
?–1928	Queen's Island		
1928–1930	Ballymena	48	(0)
Total		48	(0)

International career
1923–1924	Irish League XI	2	(0)
1924	Ireland	1	(0)
- * Club domestic league appearances and goals

John Gough was an Irish football goalkeeper who played in the Irish League for Queen's Island and Ballymena during the 1920s and also won a solitary international cap for Ireland.

== Career ==
Gough was a well decorated member of the Queen's Island team that experienced great success in the Irish League during the 1920s. The club and John's defining season came during the 1923-24 campaign when they won four domestic trophies (Irish League championship, Irish Cup, City Cup and County Antrim Shield).

During his impressive season, Gough was selected to represent Ireland against South Africa in a friendly game at Solitude in September 1924. This was the South African's first ever official international game. The full cap added to the two caps he had won between 1923 and 1924 for the Irish League representative team

Queen's Island's success quickly deteriorated and in September 1928, John left the club to join the newly elected Ballymena team. It proved a shrewd decision as Gough won another Irish Cup winners' medal in 1929, as the Braidmen defeated Belfast Celtic in final in their first ever season. He was also part of the team for a return to the Irish Cup final a year later, as Ballymena were defeated by Linfield.

John Gough was not retained by the Ballymena selection committee during the summer of 1930. It is unclear if he continued to play competitive football after his release. He returned to Ballymena in an off-field role 1934 as he formed part of the Management Committee of the new Ballymena United club which had been formed following the sudden demise of the old club.

== Club honours ==
Queen's Island

- Irish League winner (1): 1923–24
- Irish Cup winner (1): 1923–24
- City Cup winner (3): 1922–23, 1923–24, 1924–1925
- County Antrim Shield winner (1): 1923–24
- Irish League runner-up (3): 1922–23, 1924–25, 1926–27

Ballymena

- Irish Cup winner (1): 1928–29
- Irish Cup runner-up (1): 1929–30
- City Cup runner-up (1): 1928–29

== International caps ==
Cap	Date	Venue	Opponent	Score	Competition
1	24 September 1924	Solitude, Belfast	South Africa	Lost 1-2	Friendly

== Statistics ==
Club	Season	League			Irish Cup		Other		Total	
Club	Season	Division	Apps	Goals	Apps	Goals	Apps	Goals	Apps	Goals
Ballymena	1928–29	Irish League	24	0	5	0	15	0	44	0
Ballymena	1929–30	Irish League	24	0	4	0	11	0	39	0
Career Total			48	0	9	0	26	0	83	0
