= David Reid (footballer, born 1896) =

Scottish footballer and manager

Davy Reid
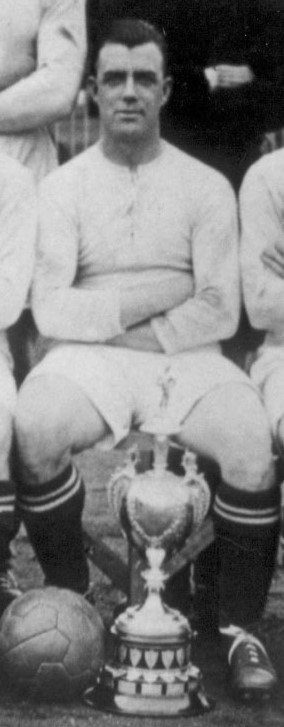
- Reid pictured with the Irish Cup in May 1929

Personal information
- Full name: David Reid
- Date of birth: 2 May 1896
- Place of birth: Kilmarnock, Scotland
- Date of death: February 1963 (aged 66–67)
- Height: 5 ft 9 in (1.75 m)
- Position: Half back

Senior career*
Years	Team	Apps	(Gls)
?–1920	Distillery		
1920–1928	Everton	101	(10)
1928	Distillery		
1928—1931	Ballymena	128	(12)
1931–?	Drumcondra		
Total		229	(22)

International career
1919–1929	Irish League XI	4	(1)

Managerial career
- 1931–1934: Drumcondra
- 1934: Glentoran
- * Club domestic league appearances and goals

David Reid (2 May 1896 – March 1963) was a Scottish football player who played for Everton, captained Ballymena to Irish Cup success in 1929 and also managed both sides of the Irish border with Drumcondra and Glentoran.

== Early life ==
The Reid family originally came from the Riccarton area near Kilmarnock in Scotland, but moved to Belfast in 1900. David (who had a twin sister Mary) and siblings including Jimmy, Max and Jack were born in Scotland (so were not eligible to play for the Ireland national team under the rules of the time) while Willie and Bob were born in Ulster; all the boys became footballers to some extent.

Reid began his football career alongside his brothers at Distillery in the late 1910s, winning two caps for the Irish League representative team side in 1919 and two consecutive County Antrim Shield winners' medals.

== Everton ==
In late May 1920, Everton announced the signing of 23-year-old Reid for a fee of £1,500, having impressed during a representative game between the Irish and English leagues, in which Reid scored.

Reid made his debut against Bradford Park Avenue in August 1920, going on to make 101 appearances for the Toffees, scoring 10 goals during eight seasons at Goodison Park. In February 1928, Reid returned to Northern Ireland to finish the 1927–28 season with Distillery. Everton went onto win the English First Division that season.

== Ballymena ==
Despite having been highly expected to complete a permanent move back to Distillery in the summer of 1928, Reid was convinced to join the new Ballymena team who had been recently formed to compete in the Irish League for the 1928–29 season. He signed for the Light Blues as club captain in June 1928 alongside his older brother John, who had also returned home from fellow Merseyside club, New Brighton. The Braidmen experienced immediate success with a shock win in the 1929 Irish Cup final against Belfast Celtic.

The Ballymena side led by Reid proved their debut season success was no fluke with back-to-back Irish Cup final appearances in 1930 and 1931. His performances for the new side led to a return to the Irish League representative team during the 1929–30 season. During three seasons, Reid made 128 appearances and scored 12 goals at the Ballymena Showgrounds.

== Post Ballymena career ==
In August 1931, Reid took up the position of player-manager at struggling Drumcondra in the League of Ireland. He returned North back to the Irish League for the 1934–35 season, having retired from playing to become manager of Glentoran, but only lasted until September 1934 before resigning his post at The Oval.

== Club honours ==
Distillery

- County Antrim Shield winner: 1918–19, 1919–20

Ballymena

- Irish Cup winner: 1928–29
- Irish Cup runner-up: 1929–30, 1930–31
- City Cup runner-up: 1928–29

== Statistics ==
Appearances and goals by club, season and competition
Club	Season	League			FA Cup		Other		Total	
Club	Season	Division	Apps	Goals	Apps	Goals	Apps	Goals	Apps	Goals
Distillery	1918–19	Irish League								
Distillery	1919–20	Irish League								
Distillery	Total									
Everton	1920–21	First Division	21	5	0	0	0	0	21	5
Everton	1921–22	First Division	16	3	0	0	0	0	16	3
Everton	1922–23	First Division	13	0	1	0	0	0	14	0
Everton	1923–24	First Division	6	0	0	0	0	0	6	0
Everton	1924–25	First Division	23	2	3	0	0	0	26	2
Everton	1925–26	First Division	11	0	0	0	0	0	11	0
Everton	1926–27	First Division	7	0	0	0	0	0	7	0
Everton	1927–28	First Division	0	0	0	0	0	0	0	0
Everton	Total		97	10	4	0	0	0	101	10
Distillery	1927–28	Irish League								
Distillery	Total									
Ballymena	1928–29	Irish League	23	3	5	0	14	3	42	6
Ballymena	1929–30	Irish League	22	3	4	1	13	1	39	5
Ballymena	1930–31	Irish League	26	0	5	0	16	1	47	1
Ballymena	Total		71	6	14	1	43	5	128	12
Drumcondra	1931–32	League of Ireland								
Drumcondra	Total									
Career Total			168	16	18	1	43	5	229	22
