= Header (association football) =

Technique used in association football

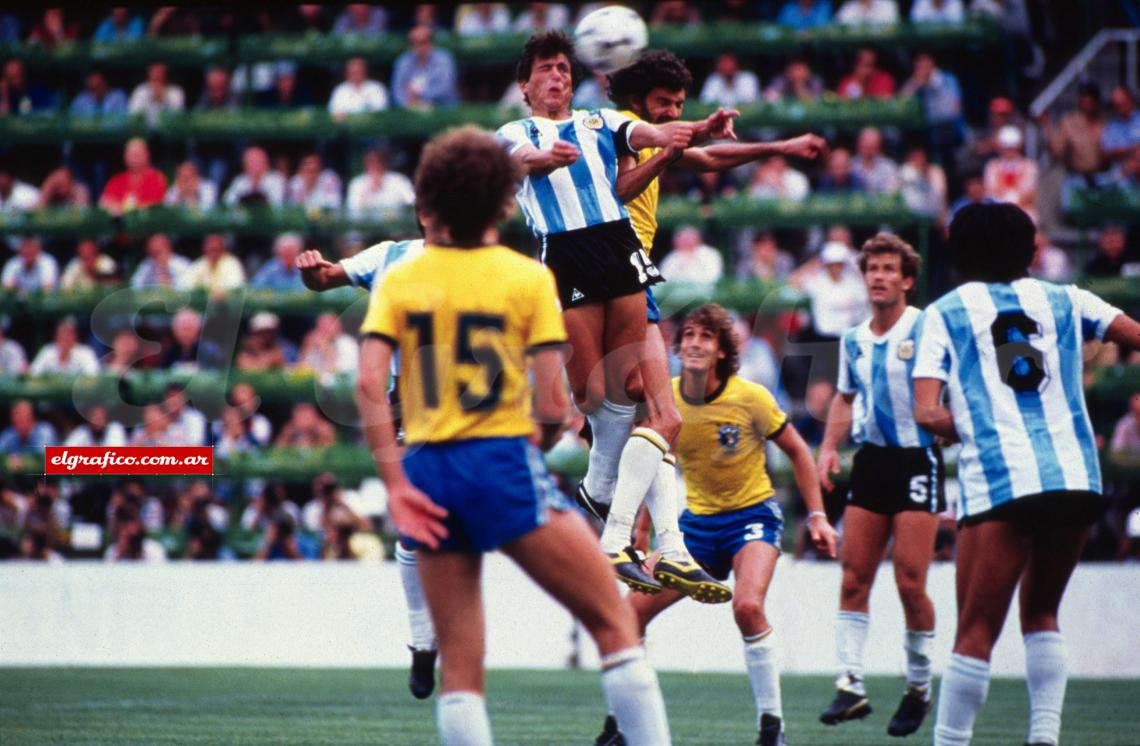
Daniel Passarella of Argentina jumping and heading v Brazil in the 1982 FIFA World Cup

A header is a technique that is used in association football to control the ball using the head to pass, shoot, or clear. This can be done from a standing, jumping, or diving position. Heading is a common technique and is used by players in practically every match. Although a useful technique in football, heading carries significant health risks, particularly to the brain, and governing bodies have taken measures to address these risks.

== Usage ==
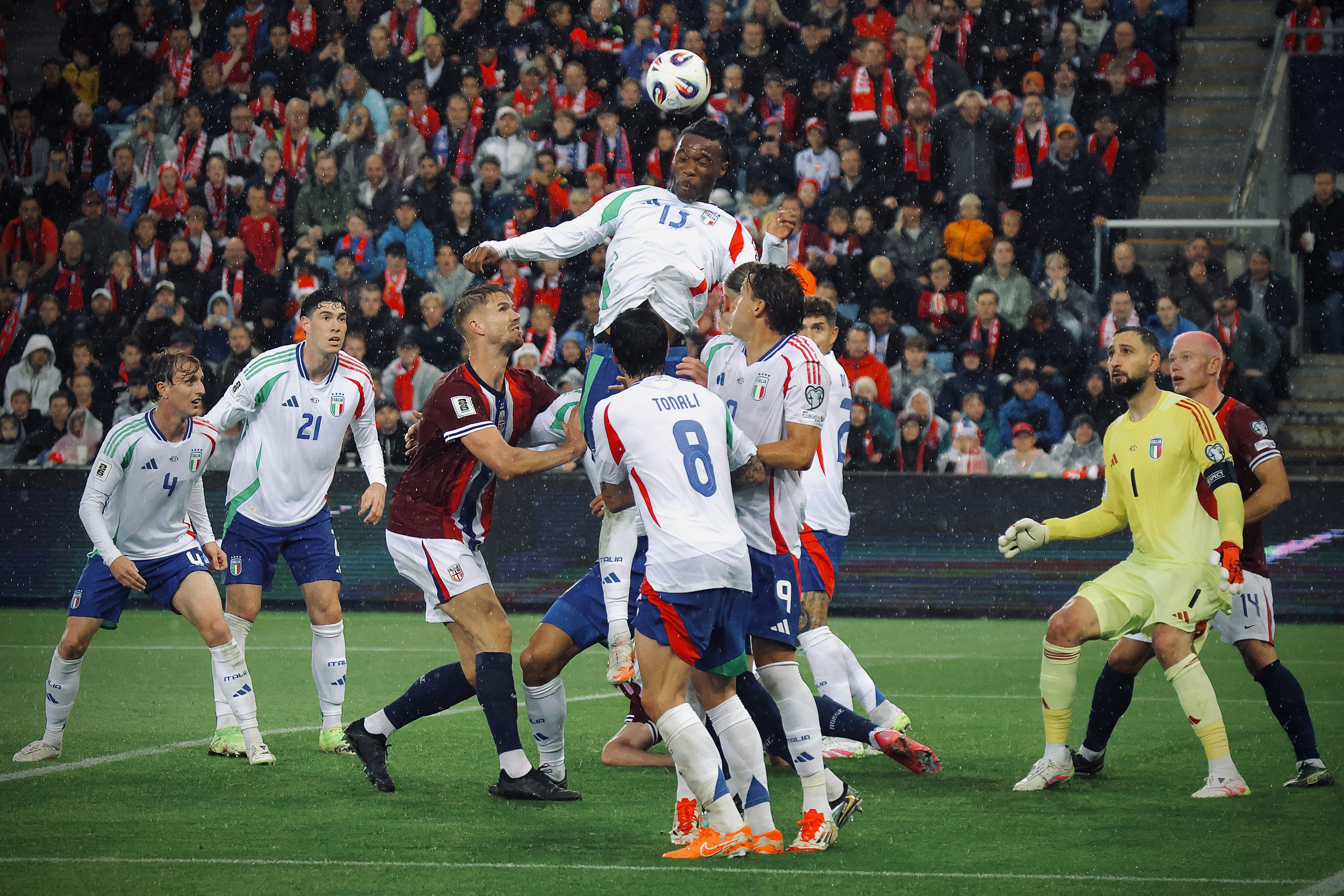
Italian defender Destiny Udogie during a 2026 FIFA World Cup qualification match

In general, a forward uses a header to score a goal, while a defender mostly uses a header to prevent the scoring of a goal by the opponent. When the ball is in the air, a header is often the best option because a player cannot make contact with the ball using their hands.

Most header goals are scored as a result of a cross or a corner. In these situations, one attacking player passes the ball across the goal in the air, and another player (either standing, jumping or diving) strikes the ball towards the goal with their head.

During a football match, a player might head the ball six to twelve times, on average.

Footballers such as Santillana, Tim Cahill, Fred Roberts, Mário Jardel, Cristiano Ronaldo, Virgil van Dijk, Jared Borgetti, Robert Lewandowski, Telmo Zarra, Dixie Dean, Luuk de Jong, Aleksandar Mitrović, Sándor Kocsis, Jan Koller, Ruud Geels, Pelé, Sergio Ramos, Hakan Şükür, Oliver Bierhoff, Kennet Andersson, Iván Zamorano, Christian Vieri, and Miroslav Klose are some examples of players who are known for the quality of their headers.

== Health concerns ==
=== Risks ===
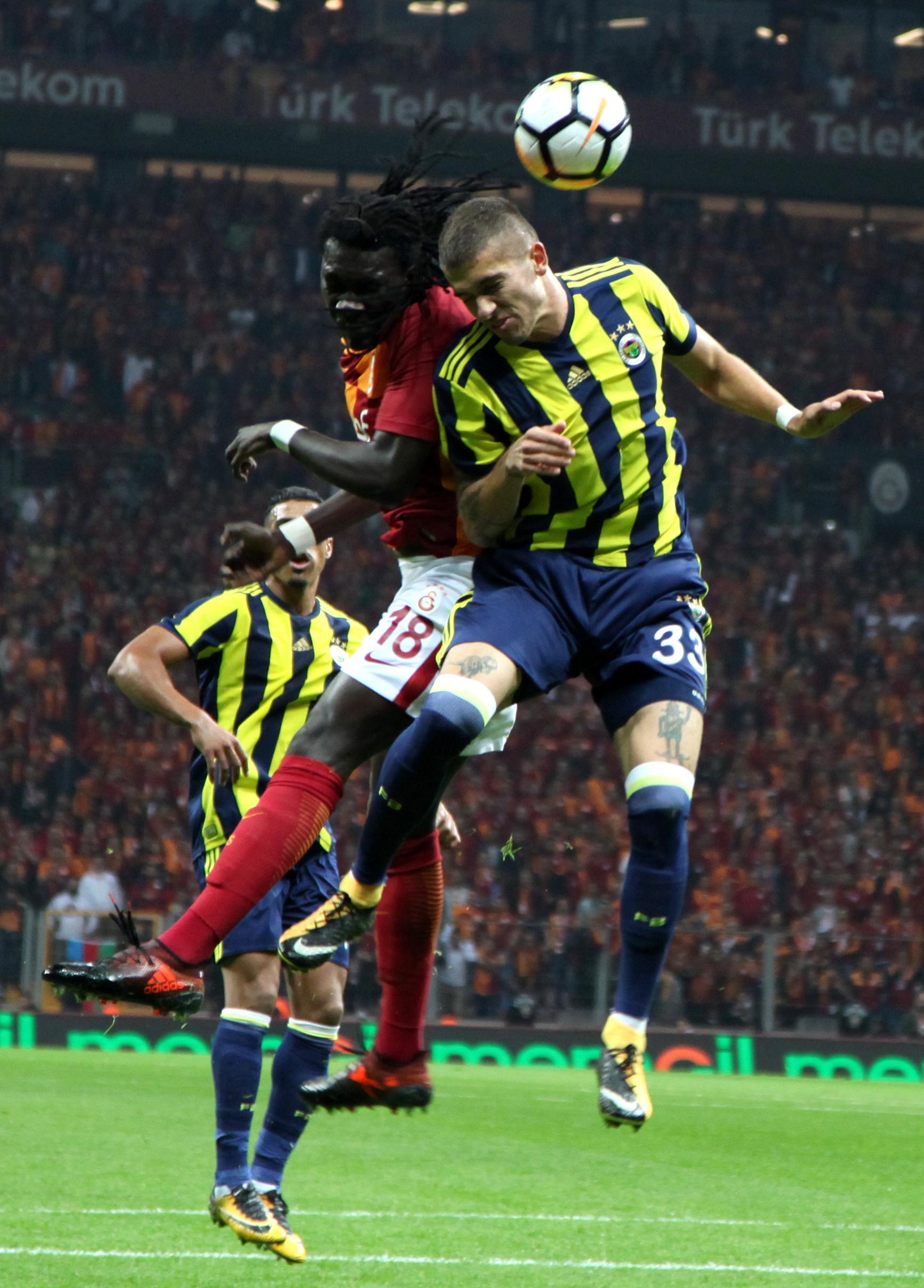
Bafétimbi Gomis (left) and Roman Neustädter (right) nearly butt heads while competing for a header during The Intercontinental Derby in 2017

Heading the ball, whether in practice or a competitive match, carries health risks that can become apparent immediately or after a few years. Additionally, injury can occur from just one instance of heading the ball or an accumulation of repetitive headers.

The most common injury associated with heading is concussions, which account for 22% of all football injuries. Subconcussive injuries are also a concern when heading the ball. While symptoms for subconcussive injuries are not as apparent as a concussion, damage is still being dealt to the brain. In some cases, subconcussive injuries can be more severe than concussions in the long run.

A 2019 study shows that footballers, with the exclusion of goal keepers, are three and a half times more likely to suffer from neurodegenerative disease than the general population. In 2021, research had been published that shows defenders are at greater risk of developing dementia.

=== Incidents ===
Jeff Astle, a former English professional football player, was ruled to have died from an industrial disease, chronic traumatic encephalopathy, which was linked to heading of footballs. Former Wales professional football player, Alan Jarvis, was ruled to have died in a similar fashion.

=== Responses ===
==== United States ====
In 2016, the United States Soccer Foundation implemented measures to mitigate the risks of heading the ball. The first is that children aged 10 and under cannot head the ball in practice or in games. The second limits heading for children aged 12 and 13. They are allowed to practice heading for only 30 minutes a week, and the total number of headers per player, per week cannot exceed 20. There are no restrictions on heading in a game for children aged 12 and 13.

In addition to the restrictions above, the US Soccer Federation has also updated their rules for matches. Under the new rules, if a player aged 10 and under deliberately heads a ball in a match, an indirect free kick is awarded to the opposing team. Additionally, if a player is substituted from a match due to a suspected head injury, that substitution does not count towards the team's total number of allowed substitutions.

==== England ====
In 2020, the Football Association (FA) provided guidance that advised coaches against practicing headers in practice for children aged 11 and under. They also advised coaches to introduce light heading practice for children playing in U-12 to U-16. They even made recommendations for professional football, advising only 10 high-force headers in practice per week.

In July 2022, the FA announced they received approval from the International Football Association Board (IFAB) to trial the removal of deliberate heading in matches for those playing U-12 and under. The trial will run for the 2022–23 season and will be coordinated with the County FA network, leagues, clubs, and schools. If successful, the FA will then apply to IFAB for a law change. If approved, deliberate heading will be banned in matches at the U-12 level and below starting in the 2023–24 season.

==== France ====
In December 2025, the French Football Federation (FFF) introduced guidelines limiting heading among youth players. The guidelines prohibit heading practice for players in the U6–U9 age groups and limit heading training for U10–U17 players to a maximum of 15 minutes per session. The FFF said the measures were intended to provide a progressive and precautionary approach to teaching heading.

==== Italy ====
In July 2026, Italian Serie A club Como banned heading in training and matches for its under-8 to under-10 academy teams following consultation with former player and France international Raphaël Varane. The measure aims to reduce head impacts while players' brains are still developing. The policy also requires throw-ins to be restarted with the ball played along the ground rather than headed.

==== Risk mitigation ====
Although the risks of heading a football cannot be eliminated, recommendations have been made to mitigate those risks. The first is to learn the proper technique. There are ways to strike a football with the head that decreases harmful impact, such as stabilizing the neck. One can also wear headgear to reduce impact. Additionally, strengthening neck muscles can help reduce the risk of harm.

Another recommendation is to change the properties of the football being used. Studies have shown that a ball with lower air pressure and lower mass reduce acceleration and impact to the brain. While this may not be a feasible option for competitive matches, experts suggest implementing these changes to balls being used during practice.

== Records and statistics ==
=== Most headed goals all-time (men) ===
Players in Bold are still active. Only official matches. Including lower competitions. At least 100 goals. As of 21 November 2026.

R	Player	Years	Goals
1	(Scotland) Jimmy McGrory	1921–1937	162
2	(Portugal) **Cristiano Ronaldo**	2002–	160
3	(Northern Ireland) Fred Roberts	1922–1938	142
4	(Brazil) Mário Jardel	1991–2011	132
5	(Spain) Santillana	1970–1988	129
6	(Mexico) Jared Borgetti	1994–2010	127
7	(England) Dixie Dean	1923–1940	125
8	(Spain) Telmo Zarra	1939–1957	122
9	(Poland) **Robert Lewandowski**	2005–	120
10	(Turkey) Hakan Şükür	1987–2008	118
11	(Netherlands) **Luuk de Jong**	2008–	117
12	(Serbia) **Aleksandar Mitrović**	2011–	115
13	(Hungary) Sándor Kocsis	1946–1965	112
14	(Australia) Tim Cahill	1998–2019	111
15	(Czech Republic) Jan Koller	1994–2011	107
16	(England) **Harry Kane**	2009–	107
17	(Netherlands) Ruud Geels	1964–1985	105
18	(Brazil) Pelé	1956–1977	101

=== Most headed goals all-time (women) ===
Players in Bold are still active. Only official matches. Including lower competitions. At least 100 goals. As of 28 June 2026.

R	Player	Years	Goals
1	(France) **Wendie Renard**	2006–	**126**
2	(United States) Abby Wambach	1998–2015	**77**
3	(France) **Marie-Antoinette Katoto**	2015–	**71**
4	(Norway) **Ada Hegerberg**	2010–	**70**
5	(France) **Eugenie Le Sommer**	2007–	**69**

=== Most headed goals in a single game ===
==== Men ====
The record for the most headed goals scored by a men’s player in an official match is five; no player has scored six or more headed goals in a single official match.

Player	Year	Score	G	Div.	Details
(Singapore) Dolfattah	1931	**Malays** 8–1 Singapore Recreation Club (SRC)	**5**	1	Dolfattah scored five headed goals in Singapore Amateur Football Association League match, against Singapore Recreation Club (SRC), on 24 April 1931.
(Northern Ireland) Fred Roberts	1932	**Glentoran** 7–5 Ards	**5**	1	Roberts scored five headed goals in 1932–33 Irish League match, against Ards, on 24 September 1932.
(Brazil) Dondinho	1938	**Yuracan** 6–2 Smart Futebol Clube	**5**	6	Dondinho scored 5 goals with headers in Yuracan's win against their arch-rivals in the 1939 regional interior Championship of Itajubá, Minas Gerais.
(Socialist Federal Republic of Yugoslavia) Dušan Bajević	1972	**Yugoslavia** 10–0 Venezuela	**5**	NT	Bajević scored 5 goals with headers in Yugoslavia's win against Venezuela in the Brazil Independence Cup.
(England) Russ Dunkley	2013	**AFC Rushden & Diamonds** 8–0 Cockfosters	**5**	NC	Dunkley scored 5 goals with headers in AFC Rushden & Diamonds's win against Cockfosters in the 2013–14 FA Cup qualifying rounds.

==== Women ====
The record for the most headed goals scored by a women’s player in an official match is six; no player has scored seven or more headed goals in a single official match.

Player	Year	Score	G	Div.	Details
(Northern Ireland) Karen Walker	1991	Doncaster Belles 14–0 Leyton Orient WFC	**6**	1	Walker scored six headed goals out of the eight she scored, on 1 December 1991 in the fourth round of the 1991–92 edition, of the FA Women's Cup.

== See also ==
- Volley
- Shooting
- Chip
