= Re-election (Football League) =

Former football practice

The re-election system of the Football League, in use until 1986, was a process by which the worst-placed clubs in the League had to reapply for their place, while non-League clubs could apply for a place. It was the only way for a non-League side to enter the Football League until direct promotion and relegation was introduced from the 1986–87 season onwards. The clubs placed on a re-election rank at the end of a season had to face their Football League peers at the Annual General Meeting of the League. At the AGM the league members had the choice to either vote to retain the current league members, or allow entry to the League for non-League clubs which had applied.

Re-election existed as early as 1890 when Stoke City failed to retain their Football League status. During the first five seasons of the League, that is, until the season 1893–94, the re-election process involved the clubs which finished in the bottom four of the League. From the 1894–95 season and until the 1920–21 season the re-election process was required of the clubs which finished in the bottom three of the league. From the 1921–22 season on, it was used for the two last-placed teams of each of the Third Division North and South. After the formation of the Fourth Division in 1958, it applied to the bottom four clubs of that division.

The club which had to undergo the largest number of re-election campaigns, Hartlepool United, with fourteen between 1924 and 1984, was never voted out of the league but a small number of other clubs were, the last of those being Workington in 1977 and Southport in 1978, who lost their league places to Wimbledon and Wigan Athletic respectively.

== History ==
=== Third Division North and South ===
The southern group of the Third Division was established in 1920, with the northern group following the next year. The two regional third tier leagues existed in parallel until 1958 when the national Fourth Division was established.

In that era, Walsall faced seven re-election campaigns, the most of any Third Division club. Clubs that lost their league place during that time were Aberdare Athletic (1927), Durham City (1928), Ashington (1929), Merthyr Town (1930), Newport County (1931), Nelson (1931), Gillingham (1938) and New Brighton (1951).

The following clubs had to face the re-election process during the Third Division North and South era:

Club	No	Voted out	Notes
Walsall	7	—	
Exeter City	6	—	
Halifax Town	6	—	
Newport County	6	1931	Lost league place to Mansfield Town but was re-elected to the league in 1932
Accrington Stanley	5	—	
Barrow	5	—	
Gillingham	5	1938	Lost league place to Ipswich Town but was re-elected to the league in 1950
New Brighton	5	1951	Lost league place to Workington
Southport	5	—	
Rochdale	4	—	
Norwich City	4	—	
Crystal Palace	3	—	
Crewe Alexandra	3	—	
Darlington	3	—	
Hartlepools United	3	—	
Merthyr Town	3	1930	Lost league place to Thames
Swindon Town	3	—	
Aberdare Athletic	2	1927	Lost league place to Torquay United
Aldershot	2	—	
Ashington	2	1929	Lost league place to York City
Bournemouth & Boscombe Athletic	2	—	
Brentford	2	—	
Chester	2	—	
Colchester United	2	—	
Durham City	2	1928	Lost league place to Carlisle United
Millwall	2	—	
Nelson	2	1931	Lost league place to Chester
Queens Park Rangers	2	—	
Rotherham United	2	—	
Southend United	2	—	
Tranmere Rovers	2	—	
Watford	2	—	
Workington	2	—	
Bradford City	1	—	
Bradford (Park Avenue)	1	—	
Brighton & Hove Albion	1	—	
Bristol Rovers	1	—	
Cardiff City	1	—	
Carlisle United	1	—	
Charlton Athletic	1	—	
Gateshead	1	—	
Grimsby Town	1	—	
Mansfield Town	1	—	
Shrewsbury Town	1	—	
Torquay United	1	—	
York City	1	—	

==== Notable examples ====
- Bradford City, who had been FA Cup winners in 1911 and First Division members as late as 1922, finished bottom of the Third Division North in 1949 and had to apply for re-election to the Football League.
- Norwich City had to apply for re-election to the Football League four times between 1931 and 1957, but this was soon followed by an upturn in fortunes which included a run to the FA Cup semi-finals in 1959, promotion to the Second Division a year later, Football League Cup glory in 1962, and promotion to the First Division for the first time in 1972. Since then, the club has spent all but one of its seasons in the league's highest two divisions, winning a further League Cup in 1985, winning promotion to the top flight of English football a further six times and finishing in the top five of the English league three times, as well as competing in the UEFA Cup once. As of 2024, Norwich has spent a total of 24 seasons in the top flight.
- Crystal Palace were another club who faced the threat of losing their league status during this era, only to retain their membership and go on to survive and prosper in the Football League. After having to apply for re-election three times between 1949 and 1956, Palace reached the First Division for the first time in 1969 and survived there for four seasons. Palace reached the First Division again in 1979 and survived for two seasons on this occasion. A third promotion to the top flight in 1989 was followed by an FA Cup final appearance the following season and a third place finish a year later. 2023-24 was Palace's 25th season overall in the top flight of English football.

=== Fourth Division ===
The north-south shift of Football League clubs during the Fourth Division re-election era: Red dots indicate clubs not re-elected, green dots clubs that were elected in their stead.

The Fourth Division was established in 1958 out of the bottom clubs of the two groups of the Third Division. The bottom four of the Fourth Division had to face re-election on an annual basis.

In this era, 32 clubs had to face the re-election process in 28 seasons. Of those, five failed to gain re-election: Gateshead (1960), Bradford (Park Avenue) (1970), Barrow (1972), Workington (1977) and Southport (1978). Elected in their stead were Peterborough United, Cambridge United, Hereford United, Wimbledon and Wigan Athletic. Geographically, all newly elected clubs were located further south than the club they replaced, a shift away from northern England to the south.

Of those, Gateshead was the first to lose its league place, after only two seasons in the Fourth Division. The club had joined the Football League in 1930 and fought a successful re-election campaign in 1937. The club was convinced it would be re-elected, especially with Southport making their third consecutive re-election bid. However, on 28 May 1960, Gateshead only achieved 18 votes, with Southport the next lowest at 29. Gateshead lost their league place to Peterborough United, who were making their 21st attempt to gain entry to the Football League.

Gateshead was followed ten years later by former First Division side Bradford Park Avenue. The club had been a league member since 1908 and had faced re-election five times before, being successful in 1956, 1958, 1967, 1968 and 1969. Faced with the process for the fourth year running in 1970, the club received only 17 votes and dropped out of the league while Cambridge United was voted in with 31. Unsuccessful, Wigan Athletic even achieved a higher vote then Bradford Park Avenue, reaching 18.

Two seasons later, Barrow was replaced by Hereford United Barrow would not regain their Football League status until 2020.

A five-year break followed before Workington was voted out of the league in 1977. The club had only joined the league in 1951, being voted in at the expense of New Brighton which they beat by ten votes. Workington faced two successful re-election campaigns in its first two seasons in the league but then did not have to apply again from 1953 to 1974. After three more successful campaigns in 1974, 1975 and 1976 the club's league membership came to an end on 17 June 1977 when Wimbledon received 27 votes and Workington only 21, finishing fifth in the tally.

The last club to lose their Football League status through a vote was Southport, who were replaced by Wigan Athletic in 1978. Southport was tied with Wigan on 26 votes and a second round between the two was necessary which Wigan carried by nine votes.

No club was voted out in the following eight seasons until 1986, after which the system was abandoned in favour of direct promotion between the Football League and the Football Conference. On 23 May 1986, the last time a re-election vote was held, Exeter City, Cambridge United, Preston North End and Torquay United had their league places confirmed while Enfield was denied a place in the league.

The closest any team lost their place in the Football League after Southport was voted out in 1978 up until the introduction of direct promotion for the Football League in 1986, was in 1980 when Altrincham lost out by a single vote to Rochdale.

The following clubs had to face the re-election process during the Fourth Division era:

Club	No	Voted out	Notes
Hartlepool United	11	—	Known as Hartlepools United until 1968, and then Hartlepool F.C. until 1977
Crewe Alexandra	7	—	
Barrow	6	1972	Lost league place to Hereford United. Promoted back into the Football League in 2020.
Halifax Town	6	—	
Rochdale	6	—	
Southport	6	1978	Lost league place to Wigan Athletic
York City	6	—	
Chester City	5	—	Known as Chester until 1983
Darlington	5	—	
Lincoln City	5	—	
Stockport County	5	—	
Workington	5	1977	Lost league place to Wimbledon
Bradford (Park Avenue)	4	1970	Lost league place to Cambridge United
Newport County	4	—	
Northampton Town	4	—	
Doncaster Rovers	3	—	
Hereford United	3	—	
Bradford City	2	—	
Exeter City	2	—	
Oldham Athletic	2	—	
Scunthorpe United	2	—	
Torquay United	2	—	
Aldershot	1	—	
Blackpool	1	—	
Cambridge United	1	—	
Colchester United	1	—	
Gateshead	1	1960	Lost league place to Peterborough United
Grimsby Town	1	—	
Preston North End	1	—	
Swansea City	1	—	
Tranmere Rovers	1	—	
Wrexham	1	—	

- While not voted out, in 1962 Accrington Stanley resigned from the league and in its place Oxford United was elected. In 1968 Port Vale was forced to face the re-election process after having been expelled that season.

Between 1958 and 1986, many of the clubs who finished in the bottom four of the Fourth Division were the same ones who had been in the bottom two of the regionalised Third Division. However, several clubs more familiar with the higher reaches of English football were also faced with the re-election process.

Bradford Park Avenue, who had played in the First Division during the 1914-15 season and for two seasons after the resumption of league football following World War I, were voted out of the Football League in 1970 and replaced by Cambridge United.

Oldham Athletic, who spent nine seasons in the First Division leading up to 1923 and had been league runners-up in 1915, had to apply for re-election at the end of the first two campaigns of the new Fourth Division.

Two clubs who had been successful more recently were also faced with having to apply for re-election during the final years of the system. Blackpool, FA Cup winners in 1953 and First Division members as recently as 1971, had to apply for re-election in 1983, as did Preston North End, who had won the first two Football League titles in 1889 and 1890, as well as winning the FA Cup as late as 1938 and playing in the First Division as late as 1961.

Hartlepool United had to apply for re-election 11 times in 28 seasons after finishing in the bottom four of the Fourth Division, but were successful every time.

== Scottish Football League ==
Re-election also applied in the Scottish Football League until 1950–51. (The last club to fail re-election was Nithsdale Wanderers after the 1926–27 season.) After 1951, only when the league (and its successors) expanded in size could a new club join, except to replace a club which folded, left, or was expelled. This ended in 2014–15 when an integrated Scottish football league system introduced a path for promotion and relegation with lower regional leagues.

Up to 1914–15, promotion and relegation between first and second divisions was a similar process: the bottom two (three until 1898–99) clubs in the first division had to apply for re-election to the following season's first division, and any club could apply to be promoted in their stead. Aberdeen applied (unsuccessfully) for election to the 1902–03 Division One when not a member of the Scottish Football League at all—they played in the Northern Football League. The successor club was elected to the 1903–04 Division Two, and despite only finishing seventh were elected to 1904–05 Division One.

== Irish Football League ==
Re-election was formerly required in the Irish Football League. At the league's AGM after the 1928–29 season, Queen's Island F.C. failed re-election by 29 votes to four, after which Derry City F.C. were chosen ahead of Brantwood F.C. as the replacement team, by 34 votes to one. After the 2000–01 Second Division (third-level), last-place Cookstown United F.C. applied for re-election for the third time in four years. They and fellow back-marker Chimney Corner F.C. survived with 21 votes each, ahead of aspirants Donegal Celtic F.C. (two votes), Crewe United F.C. and Lurgan Celtic F.C. (one vote each). (Cookstown disbanded partway through the following season.) Until 2003–04 there was no promotion and relegation between second and third level; Carrick Rangers F.C. successfully applied for re-election to the First Division (second level) in several years up to 2002.

== League of Ireland ==
The bottom two teams in the League of Ireland had to apply for re-election until at least the 1990s; a weaker club's fans would ask each other "will we have to seek re-election this year?" After the 1920s, it was rare for the league AGM to choose a new member in place of the re-election applicant. In general, new members joined when the league expanded in size, or when an old member ceased altogether or voluntarily dropped to intermediate-level competition. On two occasions—after the 1942–43 season and again after the 1961–62 season— the league declined to re-elect the bottom two without electing replacements, thereby shrinking the league by two clubs.
