= Willie Reid (footballer, born 1903) =

Northern Irish footballer

Personal information
- Full name: William Walkinshaw Reid
- Date of birth: 3 November 1903
- Place of birth: Belfast, Ireland
- Date of death: 1967 (aged 63–64)
- Height: 6 ft 0 in (1.83 m)
- Position: Centre half

Senior career*
Years	Team	Apps	(Gls)
–	Ulster Rangers		
–	Bloomfield Olympic		
–	Queen's Island		
1923–1926	Glentoran		
1926–1927	Philadelphia Field Club	27	(0)
1927–1930	Bethlehem Steel	86	(5)
1929	→ New York Hungaria (loan)	1	(0)
1930	Willowfield		
1930–1937	Heart of Midlothian	134	(2)
1937–1938	Hibernian	8	(0)
1938	Dundalk	14	(1)
1939	Distillery		

International career
1926	Irish League XI	1	(0)
1930	Ireland (IFA)	1	(0)

Managerial career
- 1946: Ballymena United
- * Club domestic league appearances and goals

William Walkinshaw Reid (3 November 1903 – 1967) was a footballer from Northern Ireland who played as a centre half.

== Career ==
=== Club ===
Reid played for several clubs, most significantly Glentoran where he won the Irish League in the 1924–25 season and played in two Irish Cup finals, Bethlehem Steel in the United States (following a short initial spell in the country with Philadelphia Field Club) where he won the American Soccer League in 1926–27 and the Eastern Soccer League in 1928–29 and 1929, and Heart of Midlothian in Scotland where he spent seven seasons and eventually captained the team.

=== International ===
While with Glentoran, Reid was selected for the Irish League XI in 1926, and while with Hearts he was capped once for Ireland in October 1930, a 5–1 defeat against England, becoming the first serving player from the Edinburgh club to feature for a national team other than Scotland.

== Personal life ==
Reid had four older brothers who played football at a high level: Jimmy played for the Irish League XI, Davy did likewise and spent seven years with Everton, and Max and Jack had six years as midfield teammates at New Brighton. All were born in Ayrshire before the family moved to Belfast in 1900, and under eligibility rules of the time they could not play for Ireland due to their birthplace despite having lived there since they were small children; by contrast, Willie was born in Ulster so was eligible, although he was the only sibling who actually played in Scotland and was based there when he gained his Ireland cap.
