= 1923–24 Irish Cup =

Tournament details
- Country: Northern Ireland
- Teams: 12

Final positions
- Champions: Queen's Island (1st win)
- Runners-up: Willowfield

Tournament statistics
- Matches played: 16
- Goals scored: 50 (3.13 per match)

The 1923–24 Irish Cup was the 44th edition of the Irish Cup, the premier knock-out cup competition in Northern Irish football.

Queen's Island won the tournament for the 1st time, defeating Willowfield 1–0 in the final at Windsor Park. While another team called Queen's Island founded in 1881 had previously won the cup in 1882, this was the only time the Queen's Island team founded in 1920 would appear in an Irish Cup final.

== Results ==
=== First round ===
Team 1	Score	Team 2
Ards	0–1	Distillery
Barn	1–1	Newry Town
Cliftonville	3–4	Larne
Crusaders	1–1	Glentoran
Queen's Island	2–1	Glenavon
Willowfield	2–1	Linfield

==== Replay ====
Team 1	Score	Team 2
Glentoran	1–3	Crusaders
Newry Town	4–1	Barn

=== Quarter-finals ===
Team 1	Score	Team 2
Crusaders	5–4	Distillery
Willowfield	2–2	Newry Town
Larne	bye	
Queen's Island	bye	

==== Replay ====
Team 1	Score	Team 2
Newry Town	1–1	Willowfield

==== Second replay ====
Team 1	Score	Team 2
Willowfield	3–0	Newry Town

=== Semi-finals ===
Team 1	Score	Team 2
Crusaders	1–1	Queen's Island
Willowfield	1–0	Larne

==== Replay ====
Team 1	Score	Team 2
Queen's Island	1–0	Crusaders

=== Final ===
29 March 1924

Queen's Island	1–0	Willowfield
Burns	Report

Windsor Park, Belfast
Attendance: 10,000
Referee: W. McLean
