= 1923–24 Irish League =

Irish League
- Season: 1923–24
- Champions: Queen's Island; 1st Irish title
- Matches played: 90
- Goals scored: 293 (3.26 per match)

Location of teams in the 1923–24 Irish League
Location of the Belfast-based teams in the Irish League 1923-24

The 1923–24 Irish League was the 30th edition of the Irish League, the highest level of league competition in Northern Irish football. The league comprised 10 teams, and Queen's Island won the championship.

== League standings ==
Pos	Team	Pld	W	D	L	GF	GA	GR	Pts	Result
1	Queen's Island (C)	18	12	4	2	48	18	2.667	26 (Note: 2 points deducted)	Champions
2	Distillery	18	7	6	5	32	30	1.067	20	
3	Linfield	18	8	4	6	31	27	1.148	20	
4	Glenavon	18	5	10	3	27	30	0.900	20	
5	Glentoran	18	9	1	8	32	23	1.391	19	
6	Cliftonville	18	6	6	6	24	24	1.000	18	
7	Barn	18	6	4	8	23	29	0.793	16	
8	Larne	18	6	4	8	33	44	0.750	16	
9	Ards	18	5	4	9	19	30	0.633	14	
10	Newry Town	18	2	5	11	25	39	0.641	9	

Source: rsssf.com
(C) Champions

== Results ==
Home \ Away	ARD	BAR	CLI	DIS	GLV	GLT	LAR	LIN	NEW	QIS
Ards		0–0	0–2	1–0	1–1	1–2	2–0	4–3	1–0	1–2
Barn	1–2		0–1	2–2	2–0	2–1	3–1	0–0	3–2	4–2
Cliftonville	1–1	4–1		1–2	3–3	0–1	3–2	1–0	0–0	1–1
Distillery	4–0	0–0	2–1		4–4	0–3	3–1	1–2	3–2	1–1
Glenavon	2–1	1–0	3–2	1–1		2–1	0–0	1–1	0–0	0–2
Glentoran	2–0	4–1	0–1	1–2	4–0		5–1	2–1	2–2	0–3
Larne	5–3	1–0	1–1	4–3	3–3	2–1		3–3	4–1	0–5
Linfield	2–0	2–1	2–0	1–1	1–2	1–2	4–1		3–1	3–2
Newry Town	1–1	2–3	5–2	1–2	2–2	1–0	1–3	1–2		3–4
Queen's Island	2–0	4–0	0–0	4–1	2–2	3–1	3–1	4–0	4–0	

Source: Irish League Archive
Legend: Blue = home team win; Yellow = draw; Red = away team win.
