= Fred Roberts (footballer, born 1905) =

Northern Irish footballer

Personal information
- Full name: Frederick Charles Roberts
- Date of birth: 1905
- Place of birth: Belfast, Ireland
- Date of death: 1988 (aged 83)
- Height: 6 ft 1 in (1.85 m)
- Position: Forward

Senior career*
| Years | Team | Apps | (Gls) |
- Belfast Celtic
- Queen's Island
| 1928–1933 | Glentoran | | |
| 1933–1934 | Distillery | | |

International career
| 1931 | Ireland (IFA) | | |
- * Club domestic league appearances and goals

Frederick Charles Roberts (1905–1988) was a Northern Irish footballer who played as a forward in the Irish Football League for Glentoran and Distillery. He was also capped once for Ireland.

Roberts is best known for his time at Glentoran, where during season 1930–31 he scored 96 goals in competitive matches, a record in British football and club football worldwide. 55 of these goals were scored in the league, whilst the other 41 came in the four domestic cup competitions. Roberts also has the joint world record for the most headed goals scored in a match, with five. He was the first played to achieve this feat, doing so in a 1932–33 Irish League match, against Ards, on 24 September 1932. (Note: The others were Dondinho in 1938, and Dušan Bajević in 1972.)

He went on to score a total of 332 goals for The Glens, before being transferred to Distillery in 1933. He was selected to play for Ireland once, in a scoreless draw against Scotland in 1931.

== Honours ==
Glentoran

- Irish Football League:1930–31
- Irish Cup: 1931–32, 1932–33
- City Cup: 1931–32
- County Antrim Shield: 1930–31

Distillery

- City Cup: 1933–34

== See also ==
- List of men's footballers with 500 or more goals
