= 1925–26 Irish League =

Irish League
- Season: 1925–26
- Champions: Belfast Celtic; 4th Irish title
- Matches played: 132
- Goals scored: 498 (3.77 per match)

Location of teams in the 1925–26 Irish League
Location of the Belfast-based teams in the Irish League 1925-26

The 1925–26 Irish League was the 32nd edition of the Irish League, the highest level of league competition in Northern Irish football. The league comprised 12 teams, and Belfast Celtic won the championship.

== League standings ==
Pos	Team	Pld	W	D	L	GF	GA	GR	Pts	Result
1	Belfast Celtic (C)	22	16	1	5	52	38	1.368	33	Champions
2	Glentoran	22	13	4	5	53	31	1.710	30	
3	Larne	22	11	5	6	45	33	1.364	27	
4	Ards	22	11	4	7	56	42	1.333	26	
5	Distillery	22	10	5	7	37	35	1.057	25	
6	Queen's Island	22	9	5	8	42	37	1.135	23	
7	Glenavon	22	10	3	9	36	37	0.973	23	
8	Linfield	22	8	5	9	47	46	1.022	21	
9	Portadown	22	7	7	8	43	41	1.049	21	
10	Newry Town	22	5	5	12	33	53	0.623	15	
11	Cliftonville	22	4	6	12	29	39	0.744	14	
12	Barn	22	2	2	18	25	66	0.379	6	

Source: rsssf.com
(C) Champions

== Results ==
Home \ Away	ARD	BAR	BCE	CLI	DIS	GLV	GLT	LAR	LIN	NEW	POR	QIS
Ards		3–1	1–2	1–1	1–2	3–1	2–1	1–3	6–1	5–1	3–3	4–2
Barn	3–4		0–2	1–2	2–1	0–2	0–6	2–1	1–3	4–4	1–1	0–2
Belfast Celtic	2–0	5–1		3–2	2–1	0–1	2–1	5–2	5–3	4–3	1–3	2–1
Cliftonville	0–2	3–2	3–0		1–3	0–1	2–3	2–2	2–2	1–2	0–2	2–2
Distillery	2–5	2–1	0–0	1–1		1–1	2–1	1–0	4–1	3–2	3–2	2–0
Glenavon	0–2	3–1	0–2	1–4	2–1		2–1	2–2	2–3	1–2	4–1	3–1
Glentoran	4–2	4–1	2–3	2–1	2–1	4–1		2–1	3–2	5–1	2–2	2–2
Larne	4–1	2–0	3–1	3–0	4–1	3–3	1–1		3–0	1–0	4–1	2–0
Linfield	1–0	6–1	2–4	2–1	3–1	4–1	0–1	2–2		5–0	0–1	1–2
Newry Town	3–3	3–1	1–2	1–0	0–0	0–2	2–3	1–2	1–1		3–2	2–2
Portadown	2–2	4–2	2–3	0–0	2–2	1–3	0–2	4–0	3–3	4–1		1–2
Queen's Island	3–5	3–0	6–2	3–1	2–3	1–0	1–1	3–0	2–2	2–0	0–2	

Source: Irish League Archive
Legend: Blue = home team win; Yellow = draw; Red = away team win.
