= 2015–16 County Antrim Shield =

Tournament details
- Country: Northern Ireland
- Teams: 16

Final positions
- Champions: Ballymena United (6th win)
- Runners-up: Linfield

Tournament statistics
- Matches played: 15
- Goals scored: 49 (3.27 per match)

The 2015–16 County Antrim Shield was the 127th edition of the County Antrim Shield, a cup competition in Northern Irish football.

Ballymena United won the tournament for the 6th time, defeating Linfield 3–2 in the final.

== Results ==
=== First round ===
Team 1	Score	Team 2
Ards	3–2	PSNI
Ballyclare Comrades	1–3	Cliftonville
Ballymena United	5–0	Glebe Rangers
Bangor	1–1 (a.e.t.) (2–4 p)	Carrick Rangers
Donegal Celtic	1–2	Crusaders
Glentoran	0–0 (a.e.t.) (3–4 p)	Harland & Wolff Welders
Larne	3–0	Sport & Leisure Swifts
Linfield	1–0	Newington Youth

=== Quarter-finals ===
Team 1	Score	Team 2
Ards	1–2	Larne
Carrick Rangers	3–2	Harland & Wolff Welders
Crusaders	0–2	Ballymena United
Linfield	3–1 (a.e.t.)	Cliftonville

=== Semi-finals ===
Team 1	Score	Team 2
Larne	2–3 (a.e.t.)	Ballymena United
Linfield	2–0	Carick Rangers

=== Final ===
12 January 2016

Ballymena United	3–2	Linfield
McNally 32'; Cushley 59'; O'Kane 76'	Report	Bates 52'; Stafford 85'

Windsor Park, Belfast
Referee: Ian McNabb (Newtownabbey)
