= 2012–13 County Antrim Shield =

Tournament details
- Country: Northern Ireland
- Teams: 8

Final positions
- Champions: Ballymena United (5th win)
- Runners-up: Linfield

Tournament statistics
- Matches played: 7
- Goals scored: 17 (2.43 per match)

The 2012–13 County Antrim Shield was the 124th edition of the County Antrim Shield, a cup competition in Northern Irish football.

Ballymena United won the tournament for the 5th time, defeating Linfield 4–3 on penalties in the final after the match had finished 1–1.

== Results ==
=== Quarter-finals ===
Team 1	Score	Team 2
Ballymena United	1–0	Cliftonville
Crusaders	2–1	Bangor
Donegal Celtic	2–1	Lisburn Distillery
Glentoran	2–3	Linfield

=== Semi-finals ===
Team 1	Score	Team 2
Ballymena United	2–0	Donegal Celtic
Crusaders	0–1	Linfield

=== Final ===
27 November 2012

Ballymena United	1–1 (a.e.t.)	Linfield
Munster 23'	Report	McCaul 74' (pen.)
Penalties
J. Davidson (penalty missed); Cushley (penalty scored); Kane (penalty scored); Jenkins (penalty scored); A. Davidson (penalty scored)	4–3	(penalty scored) Ervin; (penalty missed) Armstrong; (penalty scored) Carvill; (penalty scored) McCaul; (penalty missed) Fordyce

The Oval, Belfast
