= 1921–22 Irish League =

Irish League
- Season: 1921–22
- Dates: 3 September 1921 – 30 November 1921
- Champions: Linfield; 13th Irish title
- Matches played: 30
- Goals scored: 73 (2.43 per match)
- Biggest home win: Linfield 4–0 Distillery
- Biggest away win: Cliftonville 0–2 Distillery; Cliftonville 0–2 Glentoran; Glenavon 1–3 Linfield; Queen's Island 2–4 Distillery; Queen's Island 0–2 Glentoran; Queen's Island 1–3 Linfield
- Highest scoring: Queen's Island 2–4 Distillery

The 1921–22 Irish League was the 28th edition of the Irish League, the highest level of league competition in Northern Irish football, and was the first edition in which only teams from Northern Ireland could enter.

The league comprised six teams, and Linfield won the championship for the 13th time.

== Season summary ==
The league expanded from the previous season to six teams, with the addition of Queen's Island. Queen's, who were only formed in 1920 and had won the Irish Intermediate Cup the previous season, were the only successful applicants elected by the league, while the applications of Belfast United and Willowfields were rejected at the Irish Football Association Annual General Meeting held on 27 May 1921.

Bohemians, Shelbourne and Belfast Celtic all indicated an intention to also play in the league for the upcoming season, however on 8 June 1921 the Leinster Football Association (to whom Bohemians and Shelbourne were affiliated) voted to definitively sever its ties with Irish Football Association, with the League of Ireland subsequently being formed. Belfast Celtic, who were not under the jurisdiction of the Leinster Football Association, did not join the League of Ireland and eventually began competing again in Irish Football Association competitions in the 1924–25 season.

== Teams and locations ==
Location of teams in the 1921–22 Irish League
Location of Belfast teams in the 1921–22 Irish League

Team	Town	Home Ground
Cliftonville	Belfast	Solitude
Distillery	No home ground	
Glenavon	Lurgan	Mourneview Park
Glentoran	Belfast	The Oval
Linfield	Belfast	Windsor Park
Queen's Island	Belfast	The Oval

== League standings ==
Pos	Team	Pld	W	D	L	GF	GA	GR	Pts	Result
1	Linfield (C)	10	7	3	0	18	6	3.000	17	Champions
2	Glentoran	10	5	3	2	14	7	2.000	13	
3	Distillery	10	5	1	4	18	17	1.059	11	
4	Glenavon	10	3	2	5	11	14	0.786	8	
5	Queen's Island	10	3	2	5	9	16	0.563	8	
6	Cliftonville	10	1	1	8	3	13	0.231	3	

Source: rsssf.com
(C) Champions

== Results ==
Home \ Away	CLI	DIS	GLV	GLT	LIN	QIS
Cliftonville		0–2	2–1	0–2	0–1	0–1
Distillery	1–0		2–1	2–2	2–3	3–0
Glenavon	1–0	2–1		1–1	1–3	2–1
Glentoran	3–1	3–1	1–0		0–0	0–1
Linfield	1–0	4–0	1–1	1–0		1–1
Queen's Island	0–0	2–4	2–1	0–2	1–3	

Source: Irish League Archive
Legend: Blue = home team win; Yellow = draw; Red = away team win.
