= Jock McNinch =

Irish footballer

Personal information
- Date of birth: 26 August 1908
- Place of birth: Harryville
- Date of death: 24 May 1970 (aged 61)
- Position: Right-back

Senior career*
Years	Team	Apps	(Gls)
1928–1934	Ballymena	238	(12)
1934–1936	Ballymena United	75	(3)
1936	Sligo Rovers		
1936–1937	Larne		

International career
1931–1934	Irish League XI	3	(0)
1931	Ireland	3	(0)
- * Club domestic league appearances and goals

John McNinch was an Irish professional footballer. He was capped 3 times by Ireland during his career.

== Career ==
McNinch started his career with the local Summerfield team, and in June 1928 was one of the first signings for the newly formed Ballymena team.

=== Club career ===
McNinch was Ballymena's right-back in the 1928–29 Irish Cup final, as the Braidmen shocked Belfast Celtic to win the cup in their first season of senior football; his most prominent contribution to the game was a goal-line clearance after 10 minutes when goalkeeper Gough misjudged a high ball.

He also picked up runners-up medals in 1930 and 1931, and in the latter final was watched by Bolton Wanderers.

A scandal over amateurism saw Ballymena wound up in 1934, but McNinch signed for the phoenix Ballymena United side, as one of only three Irish players in the side. After a disappointing 1935–36 season, McNinch was one of four United players to sign for Sligo Rovers in August, but returned to the north in November when signing for Larne.

=== International and representative career ===
He became the second player from the club (after Jimmy McCambridge) to earn an international cap, collecting the first of his three caps in February 1931, a 0–0 draw against Scotland; after the match Liverpool and Preston North End both enquired about him, but the offers were turned down. His second cap, the following September, came after outside-right Harry Duggan of Leeds United was unable to play, and regular right-back Hughie Blair was pushed up to his position, with McInch filling the vacancy.

His final cap came in a 4–0 win over Wales in December 1931; despite marking Tommy Jones out of the game, he was never chosen again. He had also played for the Irish League representative side twice in 1931, and would have one further appearance, against the Football League side in 1934.

=== Post-football ===
McNinch served in the Royal Navy during the Second World War. He collapsed and died on 24 May 1970 while carrying a Ballymena Association banner at a Naval Association parade in Bangor.
