= 1926–27 Irish League =

Irish League
- Season: 1926–27
- Champions: Belfast Celtic; 5th Irish title
- Matches played: 132
- Goals scored: 551 (4.17 per match)
- Top goalscorer: Joe Bambrick (28 goals)

Location of teams in the 1926–27 Irish League
Location of the Belfast-based teams in the Irish League 1926-27

The 1926–27 Irish League was the 33rd edition of the Irish League, the highest level of league competition in Northern Irish football. The league comprised 12 teams, and Belfast Celtic won the championship.

== League standings ==
Pos	Team	Pld	W	D	L	GF	GA	GR	Pts	Result
1	Belfast Celtic (C)	22	15	7	0	66	26	2.538	37	Champions
2	Queen's Island	22	12	6	4	46	34	1.353	30	
3	Distillery	22	12	5	5	56	36	1.556	29	
4	Glentoran	22	11	5	6	56	48	1.167	27	
5	Ards	22	9	7	6	42	42	1.000	25	
6	Larne	22	10	4	8	55	50	1.100	24	
7	Linfield	22	8	6	8	41	35	1.171	22	
8	Portadown	22	7	4	11	50	48	1.042	18	
9	Cliftonville	22	7	3	12	32	40	0.800	17	
10	Newry Town	22	6	5	11	39	48	0.813	17	
11	Glenavon	22	4	3	15	33	57	0.579	11	
12	Barn	22	2	3	17	35	87	0.402	7	

Source: rsssf.com
(C) Champions

== Results ==
Home \ Away	ARD	BAR	BCE	CLI	DIS	GLV	GLT	LAR	LIN	NEW	POR	QIS
Ards		4–1	1–6	0–1	3–0	0–1	3–2	2–1	2–1	4–2	3–3	1–1
Barn	1–3		2–6	0–4	3–7	3–2	2–6	2–1	2–2	3–3	3–8	2–3
Belfast Celtic	1–1	4–1		1–0	3–0	3–1	4–1	3–1	4–2	7–2	0–0	1–0
Cliftonville	4–1	3–1	1–1		0–1	4–1	0–2	0–2	1–3	0–1	2–6	2–1
Distillery	2–2	4–0	1–2	5–3		5–1	3–2	4–0	1–0	2–1	5–1	1–2
Glenavon	2–2	5–0	2–4	3–2	1–4		2–3	3–1	0–1	1–4	0–4	1–1
Glentoran	2–2	3–2	3–3	3–2	1–1	3–1		2–4	3–1	3–2	3–2	1–3
Larne	5–1	4–1	3–3	1–1	6–6	3–0	2–6		3–1	2–1	4–2	3–3
Linfield	4–1	3–0	2–2	4–0	1–1	3–3	0–1	3–0		2–1	3–1	1–3
Newry Town	0–0	2–2	0–4	2–0	1–1	3–2	1–1	2–4	4–2		2–0	3–4
Portadown	0–3	5–1	1–1	1–2	0–1	1–0	5–2	3–5	2–2	2–1		0–1
Queen's Island	2–3	5–3	1–3	0–0	3–1	3–1	3–3	1–0	0–0	2–1	4–3	

Source: Irish League Archive
Legend: Blue = home team win; Yellow = draw; Red = away team win.
