= 1975–76 County Antrim Shield =

Tournament details
- Country: Northern Ireland
- Teams: 14

Final positions
- Champions: Ballymena United (3rd win)
- Runners-up: Distillery

Tournament statistics
- Matches played: 13
- Goals scored: 44 (3.38 per match)

The 1975–76 County Antrim Shield was the 87th edition of the County Antrim Shield, a cup competition in Northern Irish football.

Ballymena United won the tournament for the 2nd time, defeating Distillery 4–0 in the final.

== Results ==
=== First round ===
| Team 1 | Score | Team 2 |
|---|---|---|
| Ballyclare Comrades | 0–2 | Larne |
| Ballymena United | 2–1 | Dundela |
| Bangor | 1–3 | Chimney Corner |
| Carrick Rangers | 3–1 | Glentoran |
| Cliftonville | 1–4 | Crusaders |
| Linfield Swifts | 0–4 | Ards |
| Distillery | bye | |
| Linfield | bye | |

=== Quarter-finals ===
| Team 1 | Score | Team 2 |
|---|---|---|
| Ballymena United | 1–1 (3–1 p) | Chimney Corner |
| Crusaders | 1–2 | Linfield |
| Distillery | 1–0 | Ards |
| Larne | 4–1 | Carrick Rangers |

=== Semi-finals ===
| Team 1 | Score | Team 2 |
|---|---|---|
| Ballymena United | 2–0 | Linfield |
| Larne | 2–3 | Distillery |

=== Final ===
7 May 1976

| Ballymena United | 4–0 | Distillery |
|---|---|---|
| Martin; Russell; Brown | Report |

Inver Park, Larne
