= Alex McCrae =

Scottish footballer and manager

Personal information
- Full name: Alexander McCrae
- Date of birth: 2 January 1920
- Place of birth: Whitburn, Scotland
- Date of death: 8 October 2009 (aged 89)
- Place of death: Livingston, Scotland
- Position: Forward

Senior career*
Years	Team	Apps	(Gls)
1941–1947	Heart of Midlothian	156	(62)
1947–1948	Charlton Athletic	43	(8)
1948–1953	Middlesbrough	122	(47)
1953–1957	Falkirk	94	(33)
- Ballymena United

Managerial career
- 1957–1960: Ballymena United
- 1960 (Jan-Mar): Stirling Albion
- 1960–1965: Falkirk
- 1969–1971: Ballymena United
- 1972: Glentoran
- * Club domestic league appearances and goals

Alexander McCrae (2 January 1920 – 8 October 2009) was a Scottish footballer, who played for Hearts, Charlton Athletic, Middlesbrough and Falkirk during his career.

== Playing career ==
McCrae began his career at Hearts in 1941. He later moved to London to play for Charlton Athletic but was unable to settle and was snapped up by Middlesbrough for £10,000 in October 1948.

The versatile frontman could play in any forward position but favoured the inside left role. He began his career with the club in the 1948–49 season in the absence of Wilf Mannion, but his form was poor and soon he was dropped from the side. Eventually, he was recalled alongside Mannion, where he showed his pace, accurate passing and sublime ball skills.

After scoring 16 goals in the 1949–50 season, including the winner in a home 1–0 victory over Newcastle United on Boxing Day, he became a fans favourite. He topped the scoring charts the next season, scoring three hat-tricks before Christmas, but injury robbed him from helping the side finish higher than sixth in the table that season. McCrae then scored 21 goals in the 1950/51 season. As of 2009, he was the last player to score 20 goals in a season for Middlesbrough while playing in the top division of the English football league system.

He left the club for Falkirk in 1953, and followed this with a spell in Northern Ireland with Ballymena. During his stint with Ballymena, McCrae made one appearance for the Irish League representative team.

== After football ==
After retiring from playing, he became Middlesbrough's scout in Scotland, where he recommended future legend Jim Platt to the club.

== Honours ==
Falkirk

- Stirlingshire Cup : 1960–61, 1963–64
