= 1922–23 Irish League =

Irish League
- Season: 1922–23
- Dates: 2 September 1922 – 4 November 1922
- Champions: Linfield; 14th Irish title
- Matches played: 30
- Goals scored: 86 (2.87 per match)
- Biggest home win: Glenavon 4–1 Cliftonville; Glentoran 3–0 Cliftonville; Linfield 4–1 Glenavon; Linfield 3–0 Queen's Island
- Biggest away win: Queen's Island 0–6 Linfield
- Highest scoring: Queen's Island 4–2 Cliftonville; Queen's Island 4–2 Glenavon; Queen's Island 0–6 Linfield

The 1922–23 Irish League was the 29th edition of the Irish League, the highest level of league competition in Northern Irish football.

The league comprised six teams, and Linfield won the championship for the 14th time and 2nd season in a row.

== Teams and locations ==
Location of teams in the 1922–23 Irish League
Location of Belfast teams in the 1922–23 Irish League

Team	Town	Home Ground
Cliftonville	Belfast	Solitude
Distillery	Belfast	York Park
Glenavon	Lurgan	Mourneview Park
Glentoran	Belfast	The Oval
Linfield	Belfast	Windsor Park
Queen's Island	Belfast	The Oval

== League standings ==
Pos	Team	Pld	W	D	L	GF	GA	GR	Pts	Result
1	Linfield (C)	10	7	2	1	20	5	4.000	16	Champions
2	Queen's Island	10	5	2	3	17	21	0.810	12	
3	Glentoran	10	4	3	3	14	9	1.556	11	
4	Distillery	10	4	2	4	12	13	0.923	10	
5	Cliftonville	10	2	2	6	11	19	0.579	6	
6	Glenavon	10	2	1	7	12	19	0.632	5	

Source: rsssf.com
(C) Champions

== Results ==
Home \ Away	CLI	DIS	GLV	GLT	LIN	QIS
Cliftonville		2–0	1–0	1–1	1–2	1–2
Distillery	2–2		1–0	1–0	1–0	2–3
Glenavon	4–1	2–3		2–1	0–0	0–1
Glentoran	3–0	1–0	3–1		1–2	2–0
Linfield	1–0	1–0	4–1	1–1		3–0
Queen's Island	4–2	2–2	4–2	1–1	0–6	

Source: Irish League Archive
Legend: Blue = home team win; Yellow = draw; Red = away team win.
