= Bert Mehaffy =

Irish footballer

Personal information
- Full name: Joseph Alexander Cuthbert Mehaffy
- Date of birth: 10 April 1895
- Place of birth: Belfast, Ireland
- Date of death: 1970 (aged 74–75)
- Position: Goalkeeper

Senior career*
Years	Team	Apps	(Gls)
1911–1913	Queen's Park (Lurgan)		
1913–1914	Belfast Celtic		
1914	Queen's Island		
1914	Belfast Celtic		
1918–1919	Linfield		
1919	Everton	0	(0)
1919–1920	Belfast Celtic		
1920–1921	Glenavon		
1921–1922	Queen's Island		
1922	Tottenham Hotspur	0	(0)
1922–1923	Woodburn		
1923–1929	New Brighton	218	(1)
1929	Belfast Celtic		
Total		218	(1)

International career
1922	Ireland	1	(0)
- * Club domestic league appearances and goals

Joseph Alexander Cuthbert Mehaffy (10 April 1895 – 1970) was an Irish footballer who played in the Football League for New Brighton. He earned one international cap with Ireland in April 1922 against Wales.
