= 1932–33 Irish League =

Irish League
- Season: 1932–33
- Champions: Belfast Celtic; 8th Irish title
- Matches: 182
- Goals: 857 (4.71 per match)
- Top goalscorer: Joe Bambrick (40 goals)

Location of teams in the Irish League from 1929–34
Location of Belfast-based teams in the Irish League from 1929–34

The 1932–33 Irish League was the 39th edition of the Irish League, the highest level of league competition in Northern Irish football. The league comprised 14 teams, and Belfast Celtic won the championship.

== League standings ==
Pos	Team	Pld	W	D	L	GF	GA	GR	Pts	Result
1	Belfast Celtic (C)	26	19	3	4	81	34	2.382	41	Champions
2	Distillery	26	18	3	5	75	47	1.596	39	
3	Linfield	26	17	4	5	83	34	2.441	38	
4	Derry City	26	16	1	9	59	39	1.513	33	
5	Glentoran	26	14	4	8	74	61	1.213	32	
6	Bangor	26	13	2	11	60	56	1.071	28	
7	Coleraine	26	11	5	10	69	50	1.380	27	
8	Ballymena	26	11	4	11	56	58	0.966	26	
9	Glenavon	26	7	4	15	56	59	0.949	18	
10	Portadown	26	8	2	16	37	72	0.514	18	
11	Larne	26	8	1	17	55	88	0.625	17	
12	Ards	26	6	5	15	51	83	0.614	17	
13	Cliftonville	26	5	6	15	54	74	0.730	16	
14	Newry Town	26	5	4	17	47	102	0.461	14	

Source: rsssf.com
(C) Champions

== Results ==
Home \ Away	ARD	BAN	BAL	BCE	CLI	COL	DER	DIS	GLV	GLT	LAR	LIN	NEW	POR
Ards		2–1	0–4	1–1	2–2	1–2	1–0	5–6	3–2	4–4	2–3	1–1	6–0	1–1
Bangor	1–4		5–3	1–3	3–1	3–2	0–1	0–1	1–1	0–3	3–2	1–1	6–1	1–2
Ballymena	8–2	1–3		1–1	1–1	2–1	3–1	1–3	3–1	2–3	2–1	0–1	2–1	5–1
Belfast Celtic	4–0	4–1	7–2		5–1	3–2	5–1	4–1	2–1	4–1	1–3	1–2	5–1	6–2
Cliftonville	3–4	2–6	6–1	1–3		2–2	0–4	1–1	1–2	5–2	4–2	4–2	5–5	5–1
Coleraine	5–0	4–2	3–0	1–1	3–1		0–2	2–1	3–2	1–2	4–1	4–5	1–2	11–1
Derry City	2–0	0–1	1–0	1–3	3–1	3–0		3–7	2–1	2–2	4–0	2–0	8–0	1–0
Distillery	5–0	5–3	2–2	2–0	2–1	1–0	2–1		6–4	3–4	2–0	2–1	5–3	5–1
Glenavon	2–1	3–1	0–1	2–3	4–1	4–4	2–3	2–4		1–1	4–0	1–2	5–1	1–2
Glentoran	7–5	2–5	6–1	2–4	4–0	0–2	3–5	1–1	2–1		5–0	1–5	7–1	2–1
Larne	6–3	5–6	2–2	2–6	3–2	4–3	0–1	1–3	4–3	2–4		1–4	9–2	0–5
Linfield	6–0	1–2	2–0	1–2	4–0	2–2	4–1	4–0	4–3	4–2	9–0		6–1	5–0
Newry Town	4–1	2–3	3–5	0–3	3–3	4–4	2–1	1–5	2–3	1–2	3–1	2–2		1–0
Portadown	3–2	0–1	1–4	1–0	2–1	1–3	2–6	2–0	1–1	1–2	1–2	1–5	4–1	

Source: Irish League Archive
Legend: Blue = home team win; Yellow = draw; Red = away team win.
