= Shea Campbell =

Northern Irish professional footballer

Personal information
- Full name: Shea Campbell
- Date of birth: 30 April 1981 (age 45)
- Place of birth: Craigavon, Northern Ireland
- Height: 1.85 m (6 ft 1 in)
- Position: Forward

Team information
- Current team: Armagh City

Youth career
- Armagh City

Senior career*
Years	Team	Apps	(Gls)
1999–2001	Dungannon Swifts	42	(4)
2001–2005	Ballymena United	96	(48)
2004–2005	→ Armagh City (loan)	6	(6)
2005	Linfield	8	(1)
2005–2006	Glenavon	16	(3)
2006	→ Armagh City (loan)	11	(1)
2006–2007	Armagh City	29	(15)
2007–2008	Dungannon Swifts	17	(5)
2008–2009	Cliftonville	7	(0)
2008–2009	→ Armagh City (loan)	28	(13)
2009–2010	Glenavon	20	(0)
2010	Loughgall	3	(4)
2010–2011	Armagh City		
2011–2013	Dungannon Swifts	45	(5)
2013–2017	Annagh United		
2017-2019	Armagh City		

International career
2003	Northern Ireland U21	1	(0)
- * Club domestic league appearances and goals as of 10 June 2013

Shea Campbell is a Northern Irish former professional footballer who played as a striker and is currently Head coach of NI National Conference League side Oxford Sunnyside.

== Career ==
Campbell moved from Ballymena United to Linfield in January 2005. He was released in July 2005 due to a lack of first-team football. Campbell went on trial with Newry City in August 2005, but he wasn't offered a contract, and he instead moved to Glenavon later that same month. While at Glenavon, Campbell spent a loan spell with Armagh City, and the move became permanent in January 2006. Campbell re-signed for Dungannon Swifts in April 2007. Campbell then re-signed for Glenavon in August 2009. After one season playing at right-back for Glenavon, Campbell left the club for a short spell at Loughgall. Despite making a stunning start to his career with Loughgall, his time there was to be short-lived as he returned to Armagh City for a fourth spell at the Holm Park club. In the summer of 2011 Campbell once again signed for first club Dungannon Swifts, Campbell then went on to have a spell for Portadown-based Championship 2 side, Annagh United. In 2017 Shea returned to Armagh City scoring 13 goals in 15 appearances before stepping in to take over the reins as first team manager in the summer of 2019.
