= 1983–84 Irish Cup =

Tournament details
- Country: Northern Ireland
- Teams: 32

Final positions
- Champions: Ballymena United (4th win)
- Runners-up: Carrick Rangers

Tournament statistics
- Matches played: 37
- Goals scored: 111 (3 per match)

The 1983–84 Irish Cup was the 104th edition of the Irish Cup, Northern Ireland's premier football knock-out cup competition. It began on 28 January 1984, and concluded on 5 May 1984 with the final.

Glentoran were the defending champions after winning their 10th Irish Cup last season, defeating rivals Linfield 2–1 in the 1983 final replay. This season they reached the semi-finals, but lost to Carrick Rangers. Ballymena United won their fourth Irish Cup, defeating Carrick Rangers 4–1 in the final.

== Results ==
=== First round ===
Team 1	Score	Team 2
Ards	1–0	Coleraine
Armoy United	1–1	POSC
Ballyclare Comrades	1–2	Newry Town
Banbridge Town	2–3	Bangor
Brantwood	2–2	Queen's University
Carrick Rangers	1–1	Crusaders
Crewe United	0–5	Glenavon
Distillery	4–0	Dunmurry Rec.
Harland & Wolff Welders	0–4	Glentoran
Institute	2–0	New University of Ulster
Islandmagee	0–3	Portadown
Killyleagh Youth	1–3	Dundela
Limavady United	5–1	Standard Telephone
Linfield	1–0	Larne
Omagh Town	0–1	Cliftonville
Tobermore United	0–7	Ballymena United

==== Replays ====
Team 1	Score	Team 2
Crusaders	0–1	Carrick Rangers
POSC	5–2	Armoy United
Queen's University	0–1	Brantwood

=== Second round ===
Team 1	Score	Team 2
Ballymena United	2–1	Dundela
Bangor	2–2	Glentoran
Brantwood	1–2	Carrick Rangers
Cliftonville	1–0	Ards
Glenavon	0–0	Distillery
Institute	1–2	POSC
Limavady United	0–3	Linfield
Newry Town	3–0	Portadown

==== Replays ====
Team 1	Score	Team 2
Distillery	1–1	Glenavon
Glentoran	3–1	Bangor

==== Second replay ====
Team 1	Score	Team 2
Glenavon	4–0	Distillery

=== Quarter-finals ===
Team 1	Score	Team 2
Ballymena United	2–1	Linfield
Cliftonville	2–0	POSC
Glentoran	1–0	Glenavon
Newry Town	0–1	Carrick Rangers

=== Semi-finals ===
Team 1	Score	Team 2
Ballymena United	2–1	Cliftonville
Glentoran	1–2	Carrick Rangers

=== Final ===
5 May 1984

Ballymena United	4 – 1	Carrick Rangers
Fox 8'; Crockard 47'; Harrison 65' (pen.); Speak 76'	Report	Fellowes 90'

Windsor Park, Belfast
