= 1924–25 Irish League =

Irish League
- Season: 1924–25
- Champions: Glentoran; 7th Irish title
- Matches played: 132
- Goals scored: 441 (3.34 per match)

Location of teams in the 1924–25 Irish League
Location of the Belfast-based teams in the Irish League 1924-25

The 1924–25 Irish League was the 31st edition of the Irish League, the highest level of league competition in Northern Irish football. The league comprised 12 teams, and Glentoran won the championship.

== League standings ==
Pos	Team	Pld	W	D	L	GF	GA	GR	Pts	Result
1	Glentoran (C)	22	17	3	2	53	18	2.944	37	Champions
2	Queen's Island	22	13	6	3	48	23	2.087	32	
3	Belfast Celtic	22	11	5	6	36	31	1.161	27	
4	Portadown	22	10	5	7	42	35	1.200	25	
5	Glenavon	22	11	2	9	45	36	1.250	24	
6	Linfield	22	10	2	10	34	31	1.097	22	
7	Ards	22	8	2	12	39	41	0.951	18	
8	Larne	22	7	4	11	30	47	0.638	18	
9	Barn	22	6	4	12	29	40	0.725	16	
10	Cliftonville	22	6	4	12	21	32	0.656	16	
11	Distillery	22	6	4	12	31	40	0.775	16	
12	Newry Town	22	5	3	14	33	67	0.493	13	

Source: rsssf.com
(C) Champions

== Results ==
Home \ Away	ARD	BAR	BCE	CLI	DIS	GLV	GLT	LAR	LIN	NEW	POR	QIS
Ards		4–0	7–0	2–1	3–2	2–0	0–3	0–3	0–2	4–0	1–0	1–4
Barn	1–0		2–1	1–2	1–1	0–2	1–1	2–0	2–3	5–1	3–2	0–0
Belfast Celtic	2–2	0–0		2–1	4–1	0–1	0–1	2–0	2–1	4–1	2–1	1–1
Cliftonville	3–0	4–0	2–2		1–0	3–1	0–1	1–0	0–3	1–1	0–0	0–3
Distillery	1–1	1–0	1–5	2–0		3–0	1–3	1–1	1–2	4–2	0–1	2–3
Glenavon	5–2	2–1	1–3	2–0	2–1		2–1	4–1	1–2	10–2	1–2	1–2
Glentoran	2–1	2–1	4–0	1–0	2–2	1–0		7–2	4–0	6–2	5–1	1–0
Larne	5–4	2–1	0–2	0–0	1–0	2–5	0–2		2–1	2–0	2–2	1–4
Linfield	0–1	1–2	0–0	4–1	1–2	0–2	2–1	0–0		3–0	2–1	2–3
Newry Town	4–3	4–2	1–2	3–0	3–2	2–2	1–2	1–3	1–0		1–2	1–1
Portadown	1–0	4–2	1–2	3–1	3–1	1–1	1–2	6–2	4–3	3–1		2–2
Queen's Island	2–1	3–2	2–0	1–0	1–2	5–0	1–1	2–1	1–2	6–1	1–1	

Source: Irish League Archive
Legend: Blue = home team win; Yellow = draw; Red = away team win.
