= 1928–29 Irish League =

Irish League
- Season: 1928–29
- Champions: Belfast Celtic; 7th Irish title
- Matches played: 182
- Goals scored: 873 (4.8 per match)
- Top goalscorer: Joe Bambrick (43 goals)

Location of teams in the 1928–29 Irish League
Location of the Belfast-based teams in the Irish League 1928-29

The 1928–29 Irish League was the 35th edition of the Irish League, the highest level of league competition in Northern Irish football. The league comprised 14 teams, and Belfast Celtic won the championship.

== League standings ==
Pos	Team	Pld	W	D	L	GF	GA	GR	Pts	Result
1	Belfast Celtic (C)	26	22	4	0	116	23	5.043	48	Champions
2	Linfield	26	19	1	6	88	44	2.000	39	
3	Glentoran	26	15	3	8	82	62	1.323	33	
4	Distillery	26	15	2	9	71	58	1.224	32	
5	Coleraine	26	13	4	9	63	53	1.189	30	
6	Ballymena	26	10	8	8	64	54	1.185	28	
7	Bangor	26	10	6	10	49	54	0.907	26	
8	Glenavon	26	8	8	10	61	63	0.968	24	
9	Ards	26	9	5	12	55	64	0.859	23	
10	Newry Town	26	9	4	13	47	58	0.810	22	
11	Portadown	26	10	2	14	52	76	0.684	22	
12	Larne	26	8	4	14	51	72	0.708	20	
13	Cliftonville	26	3	4	19	32	73	0.438	10	
14	Queen's Island	26	2	3	21	53	130	0.408	7	Not re-elected

Source: rsssf.com
(C) Champions

== Results ==
Home \ Away	ARD	BAN	BLM	BCE	CLI	COL	DIS	GLV	GLT	LAR	LIN	NEW	POR	QIS
Ards		2–1	1–2	2–6	4–1	5–1	0–1	1–1	4–3	4–0	2–4	1–1	1–2	3–2
Bangor	3–0		2–2	0–0	2–1	2–2	3–1	3–3	1–3	2–1	1–3	4–2	4–2	2–0
Ballymena	4–2	1–2		0–3	4–0	3–3	5–3	2–2	3–0	2–0	4–2	0–1	1–3	7–3
Belfast Celtic	3–0	7–2	3–2		4–0	3–2	6–1	1–1	6–0	7–1	5–0	7–1	6–0	5–0
Cliftonville	1–1	0–1	3–2	0–5		1–3	0–1	0–1	2–4	3–4	1–5	2–2	1–2	4–2
Coleraine	2–2	2–1	0–0	1–4	4–2		5–3	4–1	5–2	1–2	2–0	1–2	3–1	4–3
Distillery	6–3	1–0	5–1	0–1	2–0	2–1		3–2	2–3	2–1	2–3	4–1	7–3	5–0
Glenavon	3–2	2–2	1–1	1–3	5–1	2–0	3–4		3–4	0–1	2–3	3–2	3–1	5–4
Glentoran	3–1	4–0	2–2	2–2	4–1	2–3	2–2	7–3		4–5	2–1	5–1	1–2	10–3
Larne	2–3	4–4	2–2	2–7	2–2	2–0	1–3	2–2	2–3		0–4	4–3	3–4	2–3
Linfield	6–1	4–1	6–0	2–2	3–0	0–2	3–2	4–1	4–3	1–2		3–1	5–1	8–1
Newry Town	1–2	2–1	2–2	1–3	1–2	3–0	6–3	1–1	0–1	2–1	3–4		2–0	4–2
Portadown	1–4	3–4	3–5	0–7	2–1	2–3	3–3	3–2	2–4	2–1	1–2	1–0		2–2
Queen's Island	4–4	2–1	0–7	2–10	3–3	3–9	2–3	4–8	2–4	2–4	2–8	1–2	1–6	

Source: Irish League Archive
Legend: Blue = home team win; Yellow = draw; Red = away team win.
