= Bill Gowdy =

Northern Irish footballer

Personal information
- Full name: William Alexander Gowdy
- Date of birth: 24 December 1903
- Place of birth: Belfast, Ireland
- Date of death: 16 March 1958 (aged 54)
- Place of death: Larne, Ireland
- Positions: Wing-half; inside forward

Senior career*
Years	Team	Apps	(Gls)
1922–1923	Duncairn Olympic		
1923–1924	Cliftonville Olympic		
1924–1925	Highfield		
1925–1926	Duncairn Old Boys		
1926–1927	Cliftonville Olympic		
1926–1927	Dundalk	2	(0)
1927–1928	Ards		
1927–1928	Brantwood		
1928–1929	Ards		
1929–1931	Hull City	65	(1)
1931–1932	Sheffield Wednesday	1	(0)
1933	Gateshead	4	(0)
1934–1935	Linfield		
1935–1936	Hibernian	10	(1)
1936–1937	Goole Town		
1937–1938	Altrincham		
1938–1939	Aldershot	3	(0)

International career
1931–1936	Ireland	6	(0)
- * Club domestic league appearances and goals

William Alexander Gowdy (24 December 1903 – 16 March 1958) was a Northern Irish footballer who played for, among others, Hull City, Sheffield Wednesday, Gateshead, Hibernian and Aldershot. He gained six caps for Ireland between 1931 and 1936.

His elder brother Joe was also a footballer; he too gained six caps for Ireland, but they did not play together for their country (nor any clubs) – Joe's last cap was in 1927.
