= Mathilda Cajdos =

Hungarian-American circus performer (1877–1909)

Mathilda Cajdos (January 1877 – 18 December 1909), known by the stage name Princess Nouma-Hawa was a famous Hungarian-American circus performer and animal trainer in the late 19th and early 20th centuries. She was of unusually short stature and was called the shortest woman in the world. She was one of at least two circus performers who used the exotic stage name Nouma-Hawa.

== Biography ==
Cajdos was born in the village of Baraolt (present-day Romania) on the Hungarian-Romanian border. As an adult, her height measured about 82 cm, 32 inches, and she weighed only thirty pounds. Around 1887, she began touring with circus companies, primarily called “The World’s Shortest Woman,” but she was also a lion tamer. Her performances included both song and dance acts and she was described by the New York Clipper as "a clever actress and a fine impersonator." She was fluent in several languages including Hungarian, English, French and Italian.

Cajdos came to the United States in 1902 with Buffalo Bill's Wild West after having made a name for herself in Europe. In August 1903, she performed with the circus when it visited Mainz, Rhineland-Palatinate, Germany.

In 1904, in Los Angeles, she married another circus performer, Maurice Andrew Gowdy (1884–1961) from Shelbyville, Indiana. Gowdy was very tall (about 194 cm, 6 feet, 4 inches) and was billed as a giant. That same year, the couple returned to Europe on a tour with Buffalo Bill, which promised that "The privilege of shaking her tiny hand could be purchased for the further sum of 1d."

The couple toured with the newly formed American "Hagenbeck-Wallace Circus" in 1908.

Cajdos died just one month short of her thirtieth birthday, on 18 December 1909, at the hospital in Hot Springs, Arkansas, while giving birth to an average-sized child that was expected to live. Mathilda Cajdos and her husband are buried together in Greenwood Cemetery in Garland County, Arkansas.
