= Joe Gowdy =

Northern Irish footballer

Personal information
- Full name: Joseph Gowdy
- Date of birth: 7 December 1897
- Place of birth: Belfast, Ireland
- Height: 5 ft 9 in (1.75 m)
- Positions: Half back; centre forward

Senior career*
Years	Team	Apps	(Gls)
1919–1920	Glentoran		
1920–1928	Falkirk	113	(18)
1922	→ Glentoran		
1922–1924	→ Queen's Island (loan)		
1928–1931	East Fife	73	(10)

International career
1919–1923	Irish League XI	4	(0)
1919–1927	Ireland (IFA)	6	(0)
- * Club domestic league appearances and goals

Joseph Gowdy (born 7 December 1897) was a footballer from Northern Ireland who played as a right half, although in his early career he was a centre forward and in latter years was deployed at centre half.

He came to prominence after World War I as a goalscorer with Glentoran in his native Belfast, and from there moved to Scotland with Falkirk in November 1920; however, he failed to lead the attack as had been hoped, with the club bringing in Englishman Syd Puddefoot for a record fee in 1922. Gowdy is said to have then returned to Ireland without informing Falkirk, intending to play for Glentoran again while the Scottish club tried to have him return to them without success. It was agreed that he would instead play on loan with Queen's Island in Belfast. The move worked out well for player and club as Queen's Island won the double of Irish Football League and Irish Cup in the 1923–24 season.

Gowdy then returned to Falkirk, initially playing alongside Puddefoot (who left during that season) but then in more defensive positions (where he had also been used in Ireland) to good effect, making close to 100 appearances across the next four seasons. In 1928 he moved on to East Fife where he played for three years before retiring from top class football, helping the club to secure promotion from the Scottish Second Division in 1929–30, although in the next campaign they struggled in the top tier.

Gowdy gained six caps for Ireland, the first in 1919 when he was with Glentoran, the second while with Queen's Island in 1924 and four with Falkirk, the last coming in 1927. He also played four times for the Irish League representative team.

His younger brother Bill was also a footballer; he too gained six caps for Ireland, but they did not play together for their country (nor any club) – Bill did not get his first cap until 1931.
