= Elizabeth Gowdy Baker =

American painter (1860–1927)

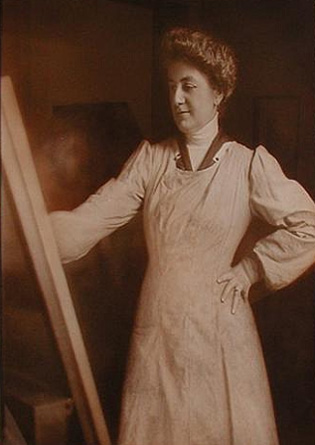
- Photograph of Elizabeth Gowdy Baker at work
- Born: Elizabeth Stewart Gowdy; 1860; Xenia, Ohio, United States
- Died: October 11, 1927 (aged 66–67); New York City, New York, United States
- Education: Monmouth College, Cooper Union, Art Students League of New York, New York School of Art, Pennsylvania Academy of the Fine Arts, Cowles Art School
- Occupation: Visual artist
- Known for: Portrait painter, watercolorist
- Spouse: Daniel B. Baker
- Children: 1

== Early life and education ==
Elizabeth Gowdy Baker (née Elizabeth Stewart Gowdy; 1860–1927) was an American portrait painter. She primarily worked in watercolors. Elizabeth Gowdy was born in 1860, in Xenia, Ohio. She was the daughter of Ellen (née Johnson) and George W. Gowdy.

She graduated from Monmouth College in Monmouth, Illinois, where she was a member of Kappa Kappa Gamma. Baker studied at Cooper Union, Art Students League of New York, New York School of Art (now Parsons School of Design), and the Pennsylvania Academy of the Fine Arts in Philadelphia. She continued her studies at Cowles Art School in Boston; under Frederick Freer, William Chase, and Harry Siddons Mowbray. She received a medal at Cooper Union.

== Career ==
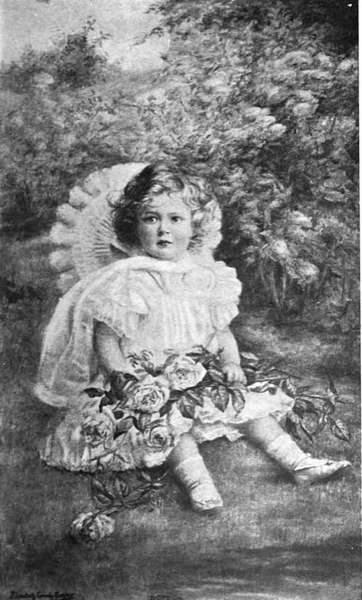
Watercolor portrait of a child c. 1904

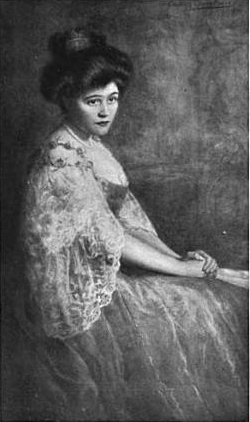
Life-size aquarelle portrait of Mrs. James A. Stillman c. 1911

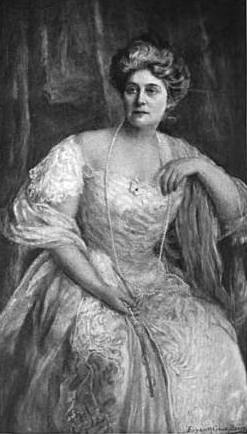
Life-size aquarelle portrait of Mrs. James J. Clarkson c. 1911

She briefly taught at Monmouth College, until she was dismissed in May 1882 by the board of trustees for wearing her Kappa Kappa Gamma key.

Baker was a member of the Boston Art Students' Association and the Art Workers' Club for Women, New York City. She was President of the Aquarellists and a member of the Board of Directors of the Studio Club of New York. For many years she had a studio at 24 Gramercy Park, New York City.

She painted numerous portraits including James J. Hill, John F. Wallace, Henry Rogers Mallory and Dr. George Montgomery Ward. Baker was especially successful with pictures of children. She had a method of her own, claiming that it was excellent for life-size portraits in watercolors. The paper she used was heavier than any made in the US at the time, and was imported. Her watercolors were very strong. She stated that in this method, she got "the strength of oils with the daintiness of water-colors, and that it is beautiful for women and children, and sufficiently strong for portraits of men". She rarely exhibited, and her portraits were kept in private houses.

Baker demonstrated skill and manipulation of large washes of color. She exhibited aquarelle (watercolor) works at Knoedler's Galleries, including one of Mrs. James J. Clarkson, in which the painting of lace gown, blue scarf, pearls and other accessories demonstrated careful detail work. A less conventional likeness of Mrs. James A. Stillman (née Anne "Fifi" Urquhart Potter), showed the subject in a picturesque gown of iridescent silk draped with a scarf of delicate lace. Three portraits were exhibited in the artist's studio in the Tiffany and Company Building, those of Mr. and Mrs. James A. Baker and their daughter, of Houston, Texas.

Later in life she lived in Palm Beach, Florida and spent her Summers at Lake Placid, New York. She died on October 11, 1927, of angina pectoris at 14 East Sixtieth Street, New York City, New York. She was survived by her spouse Daniel B. Baker (1855–1937), and her son William Munford Baker (1890–1935).
