= Pete Gowdy =

British singer-songwriter

Peter Gowdy is an English singer-songwriter.

Gowdy was the singer-songwriter of the now disbanded London-based rock group, Ivory Circus. In 2009, Gowdy's song "Turning on My Radio" won XFM London Radio's band competition. In November 2010, Gowdy was profiled by Future Sounds.
