= David Cushley =

Northern Irish professional footballer

Personal information
- Date of birth: 22 July 1989 (age 37)
- Place of birth: Belfast, Northern Ireland

Senior career*
Years	Team	Apps	(Gls)
2008–2010	Ballymena United	48	(8)
2010–2012	Lisburn Distillery	58	(14)
2012–2016	Ballymena United	126	(34)
2016–2021	Crusaders	123	(24)
2021–2025	Carrick Rangers	103	(22)
- * Club domestic league appearances and goals as of 1 June 2024

David Cushley (born 22 July 1989) is a retired Northern Irish professional footballer.

== Club career ==
"Cush" began his career at Ballymena United where he featured very little and in 2010 he moved to Lisburn Distillery and most notably won the League Cup in 2011 when they defeated Portadown. Following Distillery's relegation, Cushley rejoined Ballymena United where he became famous for his long range goals, with his long distance strike against Linfield getting several thousand views online from Fox Sports. Cushley also had his goal against Portadown in 2013 broadcast on Soccer AM. His most famous moment as a Ballymena player came when, in the Irish Cup against Cliftonville, with United losing 1–0 in the last few minutes, Cushley equalised with a deflected free kick and then almost immediately after scored a free kick to win the game. In January 2016, Crusaders beat off competition from Linfield to bring him to Seaview.

In April 2018 Cushley assisted and scored in a 2–1 victory over Ballymena United which sealed the league title for Crusaders.

In 2021 Cushley left Crusaders after heavy rumours for the past twelve months he was on the move, eventually joining Stuart King's Carrick Rangers side.

== Honours ==
Lisburn Distillery

- Irish League Cup: 2010–11

Ballymena United

- County Antrim Shield: 2015–16

Crusaders

- NIFL Premiership: 2017–18
- Irish Cup: 2018–19
- County Antrim Shield: 2017–18, 2018–19
