= 1927–28 Irish League =

Irish League
- Season: 1927–28
- Champions: Belfast Celtic; 6th Irish title
- Matches played: 182
- Goals scored: 820 (4.51 per match)

Location of teams in the 1927–28 Irish League
Location of the Belfast-based teams in the Irish League 1927-28

The 1927–28 Irish League was the 34th edition of the Irish League, the highest level of league competition in Northern Irish football. The league comprised 14 teams, and Belfast Celtic won the championship.

== League standings ==
Pos	Team	Pld	W	D	L	GF	GA	GR	Pts	Result
1	Belfast Celtic (C)	26	20	5	1	101	35	2.886	45	Champions
2	Linfield	26	18	5	3	88	34	2.588	41	
3	Newry Town	26	13	7	6	55	30	1.833	33	
4	Larne	26	13	4	9	63	55	1.145	30	
5	Glentoran	26	12	5	9	63	65	0.969	29	
6	Coleraine	26	12	3	11	57	60	0.950	27	
7	Distillery	26	9	7	10	45	44	1.023	25	
8	Portadown	26	10	3	13	61	58	1.052	23	
9	Glenavon	26	9	5	12	63	68	0.926	23	
10	Bangor	26	9	5	12	57	69	0.826	23	
11	Ards	26	8	5	13	54	69	0.783	21	
12	Queen's Island	26	5	7	14	46	70	0.657	17	
13	Barn	26	5	4	17	38	91	0.418	14	Withdrew
14	Cliftonville	26	5	3	18	29	72	0.403	13	

Source: rsssf.com
(C) Champions

== Results ==
Home \ Away	ARD	BAN	BAR	BCE	CLI	COL	DIS	GLV	GLT	LAR	LIN	NEW	POR	QIS
Ards		1–1	3–1	1–4	3–1	0–1	3–3	4–3	5–2	1–2	1–1	0–0	3–1	7–1
Bangor	4–3		3–1	2–6	2–3	3–1	1–1	5–1	0–2	4–3	1–5	2–1	2–4	2–4
Barn	1–3	2–0		0–8	2–1	2–6	2–1	2–4	3–2	1–1	1–1	1–3	1–2	5–3
Belfast Celtic	8–3	5–3	6–0		5–1	2–1	2–2	4–0	6–2	7–0	1–1	3–2	1–1	3–3
Cliftonville	0–2	1–1	3–2	0–2		2–0	0–2	1–4	0–2	3–3	1–3	0–2	2–1	2–1
Coleraine	3–0	1–3	6–1	3–2	4–1		0–3	5–3	5–4	3–2	1–4	1–2	5–2	2–0
Distillery	2–0	3–0	6–1	0–3	3–2	4–0		1–3	1–1	2–2	3–2	1–1	1–2	2–3
Glenavon	2–0	2–4	3–3	3–4	7–1	2–2	2–1		2–2	4–3	3–5	0–0	1–1	0–2
Glentoran	0–0	5–4	4–0	0–2	5–2	3–1	4–1	3–2		2–1	1–5	1–1	3–1	3–2
Larne	5–2	3–2	7–1	1–3	2–0	0–2	3–0	4–2	3–2		1–3	2–0	4–3	2–1
Linfield	8–4	8–4	2–0	2–2	5–1	7–0	0–0	3–0	6–1	3–4		3–0	2–1	1–0
Newry Town	5–3	2–2	6–2	0–1	3–0	4–0	4–0	3–5	6–1	0–0	1–0		4–1	4–1
Portadown	7–2	0–1	5–1	4–5	5–0	1–1	2–0	3–2	2–4	3–2	1–4	0–1		2–4
Queen's Island	3–0	1–1	2–2	0–6	1–1	3–3	1–2	2–3	4–4	1–3	1–4	0–0	2–6	

Source: Irish League Archive
Legend: Blue = home team win; Yellow = draw; Red = away team win.
