= Ballymena F.C. =

Ballymena
- Full name: Ballymena Football Club
- Nickname(s): the Braidmen, the Light Blues
- Founded: 1928
- Dissolved: 1934
- Ground: Ballymena Showgrounds
- League: Irish League
Home colours

Ballymena Football Club was a football club from Ballymena, County Antrim, Northern Ireland that was founded in 1928, but dissolved in 1934 following expulsion by the Irish League for making payments to amateurs. It holds the distinction of having won the Irish Cup in its first ever season.

== History ==
The club was formed by four Ballymena businessmen on 7 April 1928, immediately gaining membership of the Irish League at the expense of Barn. The first competitive game was a 0–3 defeat at home to Belfast Celtic on 20 August 1928. The club finished sixth in its first season and won the Irish Cup, beating Belfast Celtic 2–1 in the final. A replica of the trophy was produced and awarded to the club for winning the Cup in their first season.

The club reached the Irish Cup final again the following season, but lost to Linfield. They finished fifth in the League and Jimmy McCambridge became the club's first full international when he was capped for Ireland against Wales in February 1930.

A third Cup final in a row followed in 1930–31, but they lost again to Linfield, and finished fifth in the League again. In 1931–32, the club reached the final of the Gold Cup, but lost to Coleraine and finished sixth in the League. A second player - Jock McNinch - was capped for Ireland in February 1931 (the first of three caps).

1932–33 was a disappointing season, with an early exit from the Cup and an eighth-place finish in the League.

1933–34 turned out to be the club's last season. A remark by club chairman Albert McClelland about making payments to amateurs was overheard and led to suspension and investigation by the Irish Football Association. An IFA commission requested sight of Ballymena's accounts, but the club refused and was suspended by the IFA, the suspension being made permanent at the end of June.

The Ballymena F.C. corporate entity was eventually voluntarily wound up in 1936. However, with Ballymena's end inevitable, a new club, Ballymena United, had been "in the course of formation" for some weeks, and it was elected to the Irish League as Ballymena's replacement for 1934–35 "by a large majority".

== Colours ==
The club wore light blue jerseys, white shorts, and black socks.

== Honours ==
=== Senior honours ===
- Irish Cup: 1
  - 1928–29
