= Queen's Island F.C. =

Queen's Island
- Full name: Queen's Island Football Club
- Nickname: the Islanders
- Founded: 1920
- Dissolved: 1929
- Ground: Pirrie Park, 1923-24 and 1928-29; The Oval, 1924-28
- League: Irish League
Home colours

Queen's Island Football Club was a football club from Queen's Island, Belfast, Northern Ireland.

The team were champions of the Irish League in the 1923–24 season and also winners of the Irish Cup the same season.

== History ==
Queen's Island Football Club was formed in the summer of 1920, their first match was a friendly against Ulster Rangers, they were elected to the Intermediate League for the start of the 1920–21 season, they finished 5th place in the Intermediate League whilst winning the Intermediate Cup at their first attempt, defeating Forth River 2–0 in the final at Solitude on St Patrick's Day 1921.

After their debut season in the Irish Intermediate League, Queen's Island applied to join the Irish League, Willowfield and Belfast United also applied but Queen's Island were elected. At the end of the 1928–29 season, they were voted out of the Irish League, being replaced by Derry City. Although they only spent eight seasons in senior football, Queen's Island's record of one championship and three runners-up spots was very impressive. In the 1928–29 season they conceded a record 130 goals in 26 games.

They went on to compete in junior leagues such as the Irish Football Alliance and would compete up to the 1960s, during their time in the Alliance league they played matches at Skegoneill avenue, home of Brantwood.

=== Irish Football Alliance ===
After the club's days in the Irish Football League the club plied their trade in the Irish Football Alliance.

== Colours ==
The club played in narrow blue and white hoops.

== Ground ==
During their days as an Irish League side Queen's Island called two venues "home":

- The Oval (shared with Glentoran) 1920-23
- Pirrie Park 1923-24 to 1928-29

== Irish League record ==
Season	Pos	Pld	W	D	L	GF	GA	+/-	Pts
1921–22	5	10	3	2	5	9	16	7	8
1922–23	2	10	5	2	3	17	21	4	12
1923–24	1	18	12	4	2	48	18	+30	26*
1924–25	2	22	13	6	3	48	23	+25	32
1925–26	6	22	9	5	8	42	37	+ 5	23
1926–27	2	22	12	6	4	46	34	+12	30
1927–28	12	26	5	7	14	46	70	-24	17
1928–29	14	26	2	3	21	53	130	-77	7**

- *Deducted 2 points.
- **Finished bottom. Not re-elected for following season.

== Honours ==
=== Senior honours ===
- Irish League: 1
  - 1923–24
- Irish Cup: 1
  - 1923–24
- County Antrim Shield: 1
  - 1923–24
- City Cup: 3
  - 1922–23, 1923–24, 1924–25

=== Intermediate honours ===
- Irish Intermediate Cup: 1
  - 1920–21

== Representative players ==
Five Queen's Island players won Ireland caps (one each):

- Tom Cowan, Tucker Croft, Joe Gowdy, Bert Mehaffy and John Gough.

The following Queen's Island players represented the Irish League at inter-league level:

- Armstrong, Blair, Chambers, Croft, Fergie, Gough, Gowdy, Gray, Holmes, McKeown, McLeod, Mehaffy, Scott and Wilson.
