= Ballymena United F.C. =

Association football club in Northern Ireland

Ballymena United
- Full name: Ballymena United Football Club
- Nicknames: Sky Blues; Braidmen
- Founded: 1934; 92 years ago
- Ground: Ballymena Showgrounds
- Capacity: 3,600
- Chairman: Chris Selwood
- Manager: Oran Kearney
- League: NIFL Premiership
- 2025–26: NIFL Premiership, 9th of 12
- Website: www.ballymenaunitedfc.com
Home colours	Away colours	Third colours

Ballymena United Football Club is a semi-professional football club from Northern Ireland. Based in Ballymena, County Antrim, the team competes in the NIFL Premiership and plays home matches at the Ballymena Showgrounds.

The club was formed in 1934 after the dissolution of Ballymena F.C., a club formed on 7 April 1928 when four local businessmen and football enthusiasts decided that the town of Ballymena needed a senior football team in the Irish League. Nicknamed the 'Braidmen' or 'Sky Blues', latterly because of the colour of the home shirts, United have won the Irish Cup five times. The main club rivals of Ballymena United are Coleraine. The annual Boxing Day derby fixture between the two teams attracts large crowds and is one of the high-profile fixtures in the Northern Irish football league calendar.

== History ==
=== Foundation and the War (1934–1946) ===
Following the demise of Ballymena Football Club at the end of the 1933–34 season, a number of locals set about forming a new club in Ballymena with a view to seeking admission to the Irish League as Ballymena's replacement. Crusaders were also applicants for the vacancy, but at the league's annual general meeting on 20 June 1934, the new club known as Ballymena United was chosen unanimously.

The new club took appointed a manager - which was a departure from the previous practice of team selection by committee. The club's first manager, Joe Millar, had arrived from Bournemouth & Boscombe and had previously been capped for Ireland. He used his contacts in Scotland to bring a number of Scottish players to the Showgrounds. However, despite these new players and an Irish Cup semi-final appearance, United suffered in their first season finishing tenth in the league. The 1934–35 season also saw the introduction of the reserve side.

In the 1935–36 season, the club finished tenth in the league table and failed to progress in the majority of the cup competitions. Ahead of the 1936–37 season, Jock McNinch left for Sligo Rovers. McNinch left the club after 315 games and was the last remaining link to the 'old' Ballymena side. During the summer, his contribution to the club was recognised when the club granted him a testimonial, the first such gesture by United.

Ballymena United finished bottom of the Irish League for the first time, after managing only four league wins over the course of the season. An Irish Cup run to the semi-final stage, before elimination to Belfast Celtic was the only cheer for the club. They carried this poor form into the following season when they suffered a record defeat to Derry City (1–9) and lost the next six games before the board appointed Steve Mitchell as player-manager. Mitchell turned things around as Ballymena won 14 of their next 17 games. Despite their championship form, they rose from bottom to fifth in the table, 8 points behind eventual winners Belfast Celtic. The club also made their first appearance in the final of the County Antrim Shield though lost 3–2 to Linfield.

This run of confidence ran all the way through to the following season, as Ballymena United nearly completed a double of the Irish League and Irish Cup – eventually finishing runners-up in both competitions. Finishing five points behind Belfast Celtic in the league race and a fourth Irish Cup final saw a third defeat to Linfield in the final, this time a 2–0 defeat at Solitude. However, one year on, Ballymena United went one better by lifting the 1940 Irish Cup after a 2–0 win over Glenavon. This was the last 'proper' Irish Cup before province wide football was suspended due to World War II. United did not play again until the 1946–47 season. The club withdrew from the Irish League shortly after the end of the season when the Showgrounds was taken over to assist the war effort.

=== Post-war United (1946–1957) ===
Even though World War II ended in time for the commencement of the 1945–46 season, it was not until the following term that Ballymena United made their comeback into the Irish League. Home friendlies early in 1946 were arranged against Belfast Celtic and Linfield but both were cancelled because the Showgrounds complex was not ready following the removal of the troops who were stationed there.

A new manager, Billy Reid, was appointed on 1 May but only lasted until late October, resigning after citing he could not devote enough time to the job and control of team affairs went back to committee. United made a comeback on 17 August 1946 with a 2–1 home victory in the Gold Cup against Distillery. The Braidmen joined the Irish Regional League in its final season before the return of the Irish League the following season and finished sixth. The Sky Blues did suffer their heaviest ever defeat during the Regional League campaign, losing 10–1 to Belfast Celtic. Ballymena United began the 1947–48 season with a new manager, Bob McKay, who was promoted from his role last season as chief scout and had previously been in charge of Dundee United. McKay guided Ballymena United to third place in the Irish League. Despite a first round exit to Linfield in the Irish Cup, the game attracted a record crowd of 9,067 which afterwards saw the transfer of Frankie Houghton to Newcastle United for £6,000 – which was quite a considerable sum back then.

April 1948 saw United play their first competitive game outside Northern Ireland when they travelled to Dublin to play Shelbourne in the Inter-City Cup, a game which Ballymena lost 1–0 but progressed to the quarterfinals after winning the first leg 4–1 – this set up a clash with Shamrock Rovers who won the tie 8–3 on aggregate. The season did not end trophyless as a 2–1 victory over Linfield in May 1948 brought the County Antrim Shield to the Ballymena Showgrounds for the first time in the club's history – that game saw the competitive debut of Eric Trevorrow, a 20-year-old signing from Glasgow junior club, Parkhead Juniors.

The following season began with some optimism after the success of the previous campaign. However, Ballymena finished tenth in the Irish League and failed to make headway in any of the cup competitions. This ultimately cost Bob McKay his job in May 1949 during an AGM in which McKay berated the board for interference with his team selections. Norman Kernaghan took over as player-manager and after a moderate first season he finished his second campaign as Irish Cup finalists and County Antrim Shield winners in 1950–51 – beating Cliftonville in the final.

For the second successive season, Ballymena lifted a piece of silverware – one of only two occasions this has occurred – as Ballymena United lifted the Festival of Britain Cup after beating Crusaders 3–0 in the final in May 1952. The competition took the place of the Ulster Cup for one year as part of the Festival of Britain celebrations to mark the end of the war and the revival of Britain. The Sky Blues finished sixth in the race for the Gibson Cup and defender Eric Trevorrow was given the honour of being named Ulster Footballer of the Year by the Castlereagh Glentoran Supporters Club.

A third-place finish that season had many believing that United would pick up where they left off, becoming the biggest provincial side in the country; Having been the first team outside Belfast to win the County Antrim Shield. However, a series of poor seasons was stopped in 1951 with the club's second County Antrim Shield – beating Cliftonville 2–0.

Despite the fact that the Irish League had not left Celtic Park between 1936 and 1948; Belfast Celtic was forced to leave the Irish League and Ballymena benefited by grabbing some of their players, including a new player-manager Billy McMillan. McMillan was replaced by Walter Rickett after two seasons. United reached the Irish Cup Final in 1951, only to be beaten by Glentoran 3–1 at Windsor Park, with their only goal coming from Currie.

The following season, Ballymena United won the Festival of Britain Cup, beating Crusaders 3–0 at Solitude. The one-off competition was played in 1952 to coincide with the Festival celebrations throughout Great Britain, and the trophy still resides at the Showgrounds.

However, after this victory, United went through another unsuccessful period in the mid-1950s and finished bottom of the league twice. In 1955, the club was forced to launch an appeal to clear its mounting debts – the Ballymena people responded – debts were paid, and a small amount was left over to go into the club's coffers.

=== New beginning (1957–1969) ===
In 1957, Scottish born Alex McCrae took over as player-manager of Ballymena United – he had been an inside-forward for Charlton Athletic and Middlesbrough in his playing days. He brought instant success to the Braid, as Ballymena finished third and won the Irish Cup in 1957–58. The 1958 Irish Cup winning team beat Jackie Milburn's Linfield in the final – with McGhee and Russell scoring the goals in a 2–0 win at the Oval in front of 24,000 spectators.

The next year the team also reached the Irish Cup final (their eighth final); the Sky Blues were expected to beat Glenavon in a Windsor Park final. However, United failed to beat Glenavon, only drawing 1–1 and were defeated 2–0 in the replay.

The former Liverpool player, Geoff Twentyman, then came along as manager and brought the Ulster Cup to the Showgrounds in 1960 with a 3–1 win over Glenavon. Barr grabbed two final goals while McKinstry picked up the other. The following season, the Sky Blues were only two points away from winning the Irish League for the first time – finishing third in 1961–62.

Twentyman's success did not continue, and he was replaced in time by George Smith, Dave Hickson, Alex Parker, and Dave Hickson again. However, manager after manager failed, as the Braidmen constantly finished mid-table in the Irish League, with only one trophy in the 1960s. McCrae was then brought back to end another period of failure at the Warden Street Showgrounds.

=== Rollercoaster seventies (1970–1978) ===
The club reached an Irish Cup Final in 1970, which United lost 2–1 to Linfield at Solitude. This was Linfield's last game at Solitude for over a quarter of a century, due to civil unrest. It was also the first Irish Cup Final with substitutes – Nicholl filled that role for United.

Next came a "colourful" time in United's history as Scottish-born Sammy Frickelton appeared at the Showgrounds to the delight of many fans.

Teenage goalkeeper Jim Platt was transferred to Middlesbrough (where he won 21 caps for Northern Ireland) for £7,000 and Ballymena Council purchased the Showgrounds. United was now under the charge of Arthur Stewart (as McCrae mysteriously resigned after a board member complained about his wages) as player/manager. United were involved in the incident which led to Derry City's expulsion from the Irish League as their bus was burnt on a visit to the Brandywell during the height of the troubles in the province.

On the field Jimmy Martin was a key player as his goals brought United's best performance in the Texaco Cup – where the Sky Blues lost to Scottish side Airdieonians at the semi-final stage 1972, who went on to lose to Derby County in the final. United picked up the City Cup in 1971 for the only time in their history; Bobby Averill scored the goal as the Sky Blues picked up a long overdue trophy against Ards at the Oval.f

In 1974 that same club beat United in the Irish Cup Final at Windsor Park. John Sloan scored but Ards ran out 2–1 winners. However, United won the Gold Cup – beating Glentoran 3–2 with Quentin McFall, Dessie Orr and Jimmy Brown scoring for the Sky Blues for the first and only time in the competition's history.

United then lost the final of the Gold Cup to Coleraine the subsequent year and Arthur Stewart was dismissed. A former from the 1958 side, Eddie Russell, became player-manager and scored as United won the County Antrim Shield for the first time in 25 years – beating Distillery 4–0 at Inver Park. After the burning of the stand and by social club members of the travelling community, the Showgrounds underwent major work and the side was unable to play at the main pitch until the next season. On the pitch too United experienced more problems – going 13 matches without victory at one stage. Russell was sacked as a result of the team's poor performances and in came Billy Johnston.

United lost the 1978 Irish Cup Final 3–1 to Linfield at the Oval to complete a league and cup double. This meant though that Ballymena experienced a historic first in qualifying for the European Cup Winners Cup. United entertained top Belgian side SK Beveren, losing 3–0 and the score was repeated two weeks later in Antwerp, as the Braidmen fell 6–0 on aggregate.

=== Glory years (1979–1989) ===
During the 1978–79 season,Johnston made way for the arrival of Alan Campbell and he moulded one of the best United teams of recent years, "who would constantly challenge for honours and even came second in the Irish League in 1979–80". This meant qualification for the UEFA Cup for the first time and a first (and only) win in Europe against GDR club FC Vorwärts Frankfurt (Oder), losing in the second leg.

On route to an early season cup game against Ards, manager Alan Campbell was involved in a car accident which meant that his managerial duties passed to his assistant, Ivan Murray, on a caretaker basis as Campbell recovered from his accident.

The following season saw United finish third and lift both the Irish Cup and the County Antrim Shield in the one campaign. The Irish Cup win over Glenavon was by a single Paul Malone strike at Windsor Park. Former Northern Ireland manager, Nigel Worthington was transferred to Notts County for a club record £125,000 fee after the Irish Cup win; United had also lost the midfielder Gerry Mullan to Everton earlier in the season. The reward for the cup win was a Cup Winners' Cup tie against Italian giants AS Roma - which resulted in a 6–0 aggregate loss.

Ivan Murray took over from Alan Campbell who resigned in January 1982, but failed to reproduce the team's best form and was duly dismissed to be replaced by former Crusaders boss Ian Russell – who many thought would definitely bring success back to Warden Street.

Russell failed to take the Sky Blues to the next level, despite bringing Northern Ireland goalkeeper Jim Platt back home and also saw George Best turn out for the Sky Blues in a friendly against Scottish side Motherwell. Russell only lasted six months at the Showgrounds before being sacked by the board.

After Ian Russell's departure, it was Jim Platt who took over as player-manager at the Showgrounds and United, inspired by Sion Mills teenager Johnny Speak, defeated Carrick Rangers in the Irish Cup Final in 1984. However, after becoming the first United player to win a full International cap since 1933, he left to take up the managers role at rivals Coleraine.

Alan Campbell returned for his second spell in June 1984, but left after only one season due to a combination of poor results and the fans treatment of his son; Alan Campbell Jnr. However, in that season Ballymena suffered what the press described as "One of the most embarrassing results in the club's history" – losing in both legs to Maltese team Ħamrun Spartans in the First Round of the Cup Winners' Cup.

Soon after this, Brian Crockard, a young defender with United, died whilst on holiday. Crockard, a "former United player of the year", is commemorated by the club and the player's lounge at the Showgrounds is named after him.

Jimmy Brown took the reigned from the departed Campbell in May 1985, but despite two full seasons in charge at Warden Street he could not turn the team's fortunes with only a single County Antrim Shield Final appearance under his tenure, he resigned in September 1987 after a defeat to Larne.

In stepped former Reserve Team boss Alex McKee, with John Garrett as his assistant brought the Sky Blues to the Irish Cup the following season, defeating Larne in the final. The reward for the win was a tie against Belgian team RSC Anderlecht – who proceeded defeated United the following season, winning 10–0 on aggregate.

=== Nineteen-nineties (1990–1999) ===
In the early 1990s, Hagan he was replaced as manager by former Glentoran-boss Tommy Jackson. After a poor initial season, Jackson lasted only a few months into the following campaign before he was removed by the club board in October 1994. Jackson was replaced, in October 1994, by local man Gary Erwin. Despite a win against Linfield, Erwin failed to gain promotion for the club and was removed in March 1995. Alan Fraser was brought in at the end of the 1994–95 season, in order to prepare for the forthcoming First Division campaign. Despite some investments, Ballymena United finished the following season well behind the league leaders, Coleraine.

In the 1996–97 season, a league championship title was brought to the Ballymena Showgrounds for the first time when Alan Fraser's side won the First Division. This also ensured promotion to the top-flight after two seasons in the First Division. Fraser's side were also close to a 'double' when they lost the final of the County Antrim Shield to Cliftonville on penalties after being on top for most of the game. The season ended with a testimonial match to Dessie Loughery at the Showgrounds, in which United defeated Coleraine by 5 goals to 1.

In their first season in the Premier League in 1997–98, Ballymena United looked to be possible title challengers and were top of the table at Christmas time. This followed a 4–3 victory over reigning Champions Crusaders – which also meant one of the biggest crowds in years at Warden Street for the Boxing Day derby against Coleraine; with a crowd of approximately 7,000 at the Showgrounds. This initial form, however, did not continue. While a club record fee of £20,000 was paid for Crusaders striker Glenn Hunter, the goals never came and the in-form Barry Patton also saw his goals dry up as Ballymena finished sixth in the table – missing out on a top half finish on goal difference. The season almost ended in a trophy as they reached the final of the Irish News Cup, a cross-border cup competition for clubs in the North-West – but lost out to Omagh Town over two legs.

Fraser's aging side failed to push on the following season and the money was beginning to dry up restricting suitable replacements being brought in. Failure again to break into the top half of the Premier League table in 1999 was offset by a disappointing non-performance in the Irish Cup semi-final against Portadown, which turned out to be 'final' as Portadown lifted the Irish Cup by default following Cliftonville's dismissal for fielding an ineligible player. Alan Fraser was relieved of his duties for failing to meet the expectations of the United board just hours after the final League game of the season, which also proved to be long-serving Dessie Loughery's last game as he made a move to Coleraine after 11 years at the Braid. Shay Hamill took charge for the final of the Irish News Cup, but for the second consecutive season Ballymena lost the final this time to Johnny Speak's Finn Harps. The search began for a new manager at Warden Street.

=== The wait goes on (2000–2011) ===
Fraser's replacement and the man set to lead Ballymena United into the new century was former Glenavon and Bangor manager, Nigel Best who was appointed in May 1999. However, with his predecessor's aging side starting to break up and with little money to finance replacements, Best's team struggled badly during the 1999–00 campaign. Goals from striker Glenn Hunter helped keep the Sky Blues in the division as United avoided relegation on the final day of the season after defeating Portadown at Shamrock Park.

Despite an encouraging start to the 2000–01 season, United's frailties caught up with them and Nigel Best was sacked after a run of results in December 2000, cumulating with a 5–2 defeat to Newry Town. The club appointed club physiotherapist George Magill as caretaker-manager until a suitable successor to Best could be found. Glenn Hunter, who had taken time out of the game to pursue a fire-fighting career, acted as Magill's assistant. In January 2001, former Coleraine manager Kenny Shiels took the reins of the Showgrounds side with the aim of keeping the club in the Premier League. Ballymena were relegated to the First Division after failing to defeat Portadown at home.

The 2000–01 season was a period of rebuilding in the second tier of Irish League football. Shiels signed several experienced players, including former Northern Ireland goalkeeper Tommy Wright, former Leeds United defender Paul Beesley and Liberian striker Leon Browne, but the team finished fifth. This was Ballymena United’s lowest league position at the time.

Despite the previous season's disappointment, Shiels' side bounced back the following season. In a season that followed the completion of a new 2,000 seated stand at the Showgrounds, the club finished the season with little to show as they finished runners-up in the Ulster Cup, County Antrim Shield and First Division. The league campaign was particularly sickening for Ballymena fans as they were leading the table for many weeks, only to capitulate to Dungannon Swifts during the final run-in. Media attention also circled around striker Shea Campbell who scored 38 goals and a Northern Ireland Under-21 cap as he was linked with moves "across the water" and also in the Irish League before committing himself to Ballymena.

Promotion back to the Premier League proved difficult at first for Shiels. However, former Nottingham Forest forward Nigel Jemson contributed to Ballymena's success during the 2003–04 campaign as they equalled their best placed finish in the Premier League by finishing sixth and also gaining a return to European competition for the first time in 15 years through the Intertoto Cup. Ballymena travelled to Danish side Odense in June 2004 and produced a scoreless draw against the full-time side – only to lose the home second leg heavily.

Shiels was dismissed as manager in May 2005.

Former Northern Ireland and Ballymena United goalkeeper Tommy Wright took over as manager on a full-time basis – a first for the club. Despite a slow start, he brought in a number of new players in including a young Scottish striker Kevin Kelbie, whose goals in the second half of the season contributed to the team reaching the County Antrim Shield final - only to lose to Linfield at Seaview. The club finished in seventh place in the 2005–06 league season.

The following year, the club finished ninth in the table. One of the highlights of the season was a visit by English Premier League side Manchester City as part of the transfer deal that took goalkeeper Richard McKinney to England eight years earlier. The next season, however, saw Wright's side as potential title challengers - including in a 4–2 victory at the Oval on New Year's Day 2008. However, with teenager Johnny Flynn sold to Blackburn Rovers, the title hopes had collapsed by early 2008. And, while Wright signed a new managerial contract in January 2008, he resigned in April 2008 - taking a role at Norwich City a few months later. Jim Grattan was briefly appointed caretaker manager before Roy Walker took charge from 2008 to 2011. However, he was sacked after little progress made during his time at the club.

=== Glenn Ferguson era (2011–2016) ===
Following Walker's sacking in 2011, United asked permission from Lisburn Distillery to speak to their first team coach Glenn Ferguson and they appointed him in June 2011. During Ferguson's tenure, they won the County Antrim Shield and reached the 2014 Irish Cup final before losing to Glenavon by 2–1. The following year, United reached the semi-final of the Irish Cup before being defeated 3–1 by Portadown at The Oval. At the start of the 2015–16 season, United lost to promoted side Carrick Rangers, lost 1–7 to Glenavon and were also beaten by rivals Coleraine. Ferguson was sacked in 2016 following a run of five defeats in the Premiership.

=== David Jeffrey era (2016–2023) ===
Following the sacking, the club appointed former Linfield manager and player David Jeffrey as Ballymena's new manager. His debut as manager was a 0–0 draw with Crusaders in March 2016. The team won a series of games before going on a losing run, failing to enter the Europa League Play-Offs following a 0–2 defeat to relegation-threatened Portadown. The following season, the team spent a lot of time in the top six and reached the League Cup final against Carrick Rangers after beating rivals Coleraine 3–0.

They won the league cup against Carrick Rangers. In the 2017/18 season, the club finished in sixth place and lost out on a Europa League spot to Cliftonilee in the NIFL play-off system. Following a squad revamp of nine players coming through the doors in the summer transfer window, in the following season the club reached the league cup final and finished second in the league. Between October and December 2018 they had a 19-game unbeaten run.

In June 2019, Ballymena defeated Faroese team NSI Runavik 2-0 at the Showgrounds and progressed to the next round after an scoreless draw in the second leg of the fixture the following week. In July 2019, in the Europa League first qualifying round Ballymena suffered an 11-0 aggregate defeat at the hands of Malmö FF.

Jeffrey and assistant Brian McLaughlin departed the club in the summer of 2023, following a poor season in which United finished a distant 9th, and lost in the Irish Cup final to Crusaders.

=== Jim Ervin era (2023-2025) ===
The club appointed former captain Jim Ervin as Jeffrey's replacement in May 2023. Ervin was faced with a reduced budget on account of missing European football in the past two seasons, with players such as David McDaid and Craig Farquhar departing the club. In April 2025, Ervin signed a new contract until 2028, but he was sacked later the same year after a run of poor results.

== European record ==
=== Overview ===
Competition	Matches	W	D	L	GF	GA
UEFA Cup / UEFA Europa League	8	2	1	5	4	20
UEFA Cup Winners' Cup	8	0	0	8	1	25
UEFA Intertoto Cup	2	0	1	1	0	7
TOTAL	18	2	2	14	5	52

=== Matches ===
Season	Competition	Round	Opponent	Home	Away	Aggregate
1978–79	UEFA Cup Winners' Cup	1R	(Belgium) Beveren	0–3	0–3	0–6
1980–81	UEFA Cup	1R	(East Germany) Vorwärts Frankfurt	2–1	0–3	2–4
1981–82	UEFA Cup Winners' Cup	1R	(Italy) Roma	0–2	0–4	0–6
1984–85	UEFA Cup Winners' Cup	1R	(Malta) Ħamrun Spartans	0–1	1–2	1–3
1989–90	UEFA Cup Winners' Cup	1R	(Belgium) Anderlecht	0–4	0–6	0–10
2004	UEFA Intertoto Cup	1R	(Denmark) Odense	0–7	0–0	0–7
2017–18	UEFA Europa League	1QR	(Norway) Odd	0–2	0–3	0–5
2019–20	UEFA Europa League	PR	(Faroe Islands) NSÍ Runavík	2–0	0–0	2–0
2019–20	UEFA Europa League	1QR	(Sweden) Malmö	0–4	0–7	0–11

=== UEFA ranking ===
As of 5 July 2024

Rank	Team	Points
395	(Montenegro) Zeta	1.000
396	(Bosnia and Herzegovina) Radnik Bijeljina	1.000
397	(Northern Ireland) Ballymena United	1.000
398	(Luxembourg) Union Titus Pétange	1.000
399	(Luxembourg) Jeunesse Esch	1.500

== Players ==
=== First team squad ===
As of 4 August 2026

Note: Flags indicate national team as defined under FIFA eligibility rules; some limited exceptions apply. Players may hold more than one non-FIFA nationality.

No.	Pos.	Nation	Player
1	GK	NIR	David Walsh
2	DF	IRL	David Toure
3	DF	NIR	Micheal Glynn
4	DF	NIR	Jonathan Addis
5	DF	NIR	Scot Whiteside
6	MF	IRL	Fuad Sule
7	FW	NIR	Chris McKee
8	MF	NIR	Josh Archer
9	FW	NIR	Igor Rutkowski
10	MF	NIR	Charlie Allen
12	DF	NIR	Donal Rocks
14	FW	NIR	Andrew Scott

No.	Pos.	Nation	Player
15	DF	NIR	Daithí McCallion
16	DF	NIR	Matthew Clarke
17	FW	NIR	Michael Leetch
18	MF	IRL	Sean Murray
19	DF	IRL	Shane McEleney
20	MF	NIR	Stephen Fallon
21	DF	NIR	James Hood
22	FW	IRL	Success Edogun
23	GK	NIR	Declan Breen
24	MF	NIR	Caoimhin McConnell
28	DF	NIR	Tom Duffin
29	MF	NIR	Owen Mahoney

== Non-playing staff ==
=== Coaching staff ===
- First Team Manager: Oran Kearney
- First Team Assistant Manager: Barry Johnson
- First Team Goalkeeping Coach: Michael Doherty

=== Managerial history ===
Dates	Name	Dates	Name	Dates	Name
Jul 1934 – May 1935	(Northern Ireland) Joseph Miller	Jan 1968 – Dec 1969	(Scotland) Alex Parker	Sep 1987 – Apr 1991	(Northern Ireland) Alex McKee
Sep 1937 – Nov 1938	(Scotland) Steve Mitchell	Dec 1969 – Aug 1971	(Scotland) Alex McCrae	May 1991 – Sep 1993	(Northern Ireland) Jim Hagan
Jun 1946 – Sep 1946	(Scotland) William Reid	Aug 1971 – Mar 1976	(Northern Ireland) Arthur Stewart	Oct 1993 – Oct 1994	(Northern Ireland) Tommy Jackson
Jun 1947 – May 1949	(Scotland) Bobby McKay	Mar 1976 – Apr 1977	(Northern Ireland) Eddie Russell	Oct 1994 – Mar 1995	(Northern Ireland) Gary Erwin
Aug 1949 – May 1950	(Northern Ireland) Billy McMillan	Apr 1977 – May 1977	(Northern Ireland) Alex McKee (caretaker)	Mar 1995 – Apr 1999	(Northern Ireland) Alan Fraser
May 1950 – Mar 1951	(Northern Ireland) Norman Kernaghan	May 1977 – Jan 1979	(Northern Ireland) Billy Johnston	Apr 1999 – May 1999	(Northern Ireland) Shay Hamill (caretaker)
Aug 1953 – Jun 1954	(Scotland) Samuel Picken	Feb 1979 – Feb 1982	(Northern Ireland) Alan Campbell	May 1999 – Dec 2000	(Northern Ireland) Nigel Best
Aug 1954 – May 1955	(England) Walter Rickett	Feb 1982 – Feb 1983	(Northern Ireland) Ivan Murray	Dec 2000 – Jan 2001	(Northern Ireland) George Magill (caretaker)
Oct 1957 – Jan 1960	(Scotland) Alex McCrae	Feb 1983 – Apr 1983	(Scotland) Alex Donald (caretaker)	Jan 2001 – May 2005	(Northern Ireland) Kenny Shiels
Mar 1960 – May 1963	(England) Geoff Twentyman	Apr 1983 – Nov 1983	(Northern Ireland) Ian Russell	May 2005 – Apr 2008	(Northern Ireland) Tommy Wright
Nov 1963 – Dec 1964	(England) Dave Hickson	Nov 1983 – Dec 1983	(Scotland) Alex Donald (caretaker)	Apr 2008 – May 2008	(Northern Ireland) Jim Grattan
Jan 1965 – Oct 1966	(Scotland) George Smith	Dec 1983 – Jun 1984	(Northern Ireland) Jim Platt	May 2008 – Dec 2011	(Northern Ireland) Roy Walker
Dec 1966 – Jan 1967	(Northern Ireland) Norman Clarke (caretaker)	Jun 1984 – Apr 1985	(Northern Ireland) Alan Campbell	Dec 2011	(Northern Ireland) Joe McCall (caretaker)
Sep 1967 – Dec 1967	(England) Dave Hickson	May 1985 – Sep 1987	(Northern Ireland) Jimmy Brown	Dec 2011 – Mar 2016	(Northern Ireland) Glenn Ferguson

== Honours ==
=== Senior honours ===
- Irish Cup: 5
  - 1939–40, 1957–58, 1980–81, 1983–84, 1988–89
- Northern Ireland Football League Cup: 1
  - 2016–17
- City Cup: 1
  - 1971–72
- Gold Cup: 1
  - 1974–75
- Ulster Cup: 3
  - 1951–52*, 1960–61, 1980–81
- Irish League First Division: 1
  - 1996–97
- County Antrim Shield: 6
  - 1947–48, 1950–51, 1975–76, 1979–80, 2012–13, 2015–16

=== Intermediate honours ===
- IFA Reserve League: 1
  - 2006–07†
- Steel & Sons Cup: 1
  - 1995–96†
- Louis Moore Cup: 1
  - 1952–53†
- George Wilson Cup: 2
  - 1989–90†, 1990–91†
- * Tournament was renamed the Festival of Britain Cup for one season
- † Won by Ballymena United Reserves

== Records ==
=== Club records ===
Wins

- Record Home League Victory: 8–0 v Cliftonville, (18 September 1965); 8–0 v. Glenavon (8 March 1975); 8–0 v. Distillery (8 December 1979)
- Record Away League Victory: 8–0 v. Newry Town (17 December 1994)
- Most League Wins in a Season: 21 in 28 matches (1996–97)
- Fewest League Wins in a Season: 3 in 22 matches (1956–57)

Defeats

- Record Home League Defeat: 0–8 Belfast Celtic, (5 November 1938); 0–8 Cliftonville, (17 November 2012)
- Record Away League Defeat: 1–9 Derry City, (23 August 1937); 0–8 Ards, (12 February 1949)
- Most Defeats in a Season: 20 in 26 matches (1936–37)
- Fewest Defeats in a Season: 3 in 28 matches (1996–97)
- Most Draws in a Season: 16 in 36 matches (1999–00)

Goals

- Most goals scored in a season: 82 in 26 matches (1939–40)
- Fewest goals scored in a season: 20 in 22 matches (1976–77)
- Most goals conceded in a season: 87 in 26 matches (1936–37)
- Fewest goals conceded in a season: 21 in 22 matches (1980–81)
- Most clean sheets in a season: 9 in 22 matches (1980–81)

=== Leading goalscorers by season ===
Season	Name	Goals	Season	Name	Goals	Season	Name	Goals
2010–11	(Scotland) Gary McCutcheon	15	1992–93	(Scotland) Neil Candlish	16	1974–75	(Northern Ireland) Gary Erwin	18
2009–10	(Scotland) Kevin Kelbie	16	1991–92	(Scotland) Neil Candlish	18	1973–74	(Northern Ireland) Paul Kirk	30
2008–09	(Northern Ireland) Neil Teggart	12	1990–91	(Northern Ireland) Des Loughery	15	1972–73	(Scotland) Sammy Frickelton	14
2007–08	(Scotland) Kevin Kelbie	16	1989–90	(Northern Ireland) Lindsay Curry	14	1971–72	(Northern Ireland) Jim Martin	44
2006–07	(Scotland) Kevin Kelbie	17	1988–89	(Northern Ireland) Paul Hardy	21	1970–71	(Northern Ireland) Jim Martin	16
2005–06	(Scotland) Kevin Kelbie	16	1987–88	(Northern Ireland) Billy Pyper	13	1969–70	Unknown	
2004–05	(Northern Ireland) Rory Hamill (Northern Ireland) Oran Kearney	8	1986–87	(Northern Ireland) Jonathan Speak	17	1968–69	Unknown	
2003–04	(Northern Ireland) Shea Campbell	14	1985–86	(Northern Ireland) Jonathan Speak	18	1967–68	Unknown	
2002–03	(Northern Ireland) Shea Campbell	38	1984–85	(Northern Ireland) Alan Campbell Jnr	15	1966–67	Unknown	
2001–02	(Northern Ireland) Peter Withnell	16	1983–84	(Northern Ireland) Jonathan Speak	11	1965–66	(Northern Ireland) Mal McDonnell	34
2000–01	(Scotland) Scott Drummond	8	1982–83	(Northern Ireland) Paul Malone	23	1964–65	(England) Arthur Thomas	40
1999–00	(Northern Ireland) Glenn Hunter	23	1981–82	(Northern Ireland) Paul Malone	20	1963–64	Unknown	
1998–99	(Northern Ireland) Glenn Hunter	19	1980–81	(Northern Ireland) Paul Malone	27	1962–63	(Northern Ireland) K Halliday	26
1997–98	(Republic of Ireland) Barry Patton	26	1979–80	(Northern Ireland) Paul Malone	28	1961–62	(Northern Ireland) Jimmy Small	23
1996–97	(Northern Ireland) Ciaran Feehan (Northern Ireland) Des Loughery	16	1978–79	(Northern Ireland) Sammy McQuiston	18	1960–61	(Northern Ireland) Hubert Barr	31
1995–96	(Scotland) Mark McWalter	13	1977–78	(Northern Ireland) Barry Brown	13	1959–60	(Northern Ireland) Eddie Russell	14
1994–95	(Republic of Ireland) Barry Patton	13	1976–77	(Northern Ireland) Jim Martin	6	1958–59	Unknown	
1993–94	(Northern Ireland) Jonathan Speak	13	1975–76	(Northern Ireland) Barry Brown	28	1957–58	Unknown	

=== List of internationals ===
This is a list of players with appearances at international level while playing for Ballymena United.

- Jackie Mahood (1 cap)
- Jimmy McCambridge (2 caps)
- Jock McNinch (3 caps)
- Jim Platt (1 cap)
