= Barn F.C. =

- Full name: Barn Football Club
- Founded: 1889
- Dissolved: 1928
- Ground: Barn Field, Carrickfergus
- League: Irish Football League
Home colours

Barn Football Club was an Irish football club based in Carrickfergus, County Antrim.

== History ==
The club was founded in 1889 by workers in the James Taylor & Co. cotton mill, known as the Barn Mills, in Carrickfergus. The club entered the Irish Junior Cup for the first time in 1890–91 and the County Antrim Shield in 1891–92, in which they reached the semi-final. In 1923, Barn was elected to an expanded Irish Football League, but retained membership only for five seasons. Financial difficulties meant that the team played the 1927–28 season with a squad made up entirely of amateurs, finishing second bottom, and folding at the season's end The club's ground was the Barn Field, later known as Taylors Avenue.

Barn United, founded in 1954, took their name from Barn and continue to play in the same area.

== Colours ==
The club wore amber and black.
