= 1943–44 Irish Cup =

Tournament details
- Country: Northern Ireland
- Teams: 13

Final positions
- Champions: Belfast Celtic (7th win)
- Runners-up: Linfield

Tournament statistics
- Matches played: 22
- Goals scored: 93 (4.23 per match)

The 1943–44 Irish Cup was the 64th edition of the Irish Cup, the premier knock-out cup competition in Northern Irish football.

Belfast Celtic won the tournament for the 7th time and 2nd consecutive year, defeating Linfield 3–1 in the final at Windsor Park.

== Results ==
=== First round ===
Team 1	Agg.	Team 2	1st leg	2nd leg
Bangor	3–5	Ards	3–2	0–3
Cliftonville	3–2	Derry City	3–0	0–2
Coleraine	1–9	Distillery	0–3	1–6
Glentoran	3–16	Belfast Celtic	1–7	2–9
Victoria Works	4–7	Bangor Reserves	1–4	3–3
Infantry Training Centre	bye			
Larne	bye			
Linfield	bye			

=== Quarter-finals ===
Team 1	Agg.	Team 2	1st leg	2nd leg
Bangor Reserves	2–3	Infantry Training Centre	0–1	2–2
Belfast Celtic	7–1	Distillery	3–0	4–1
Cliftonville	5–2	Ards	2–2	3–0
Linfield	8–3	Larne	4–2	4–1

=== Semi-finals ===
Team 1	Score	Team 2
Belfast Celtic	3–0	Infantry Training Centre
Linfield	0–0	Cliftonville

==== Replay ====
Team 1	Score	Team 2
Linfield	2–0	Cliftonville

=== Final ===
22 April 1944

Belfast Celtic	3–1	Linfield
Bonner 16'; McAlinden 29'; A. Kelly 77'	Report	Cochrane 80'

Windsor Park, Belfast
Attendance: 25,240
Referee: T. Hunter
