= 1944–45 Irish Cup =

Tournament details
- Country: Northern Ireland
- Teams: 12

Final positions
- Champions: Linfield (22nd win)
- Runners-up: Glentoran

Tournament statistics
- Matches played: 17
- Goals scored: 100 (5.88 per match)

The 1944–45 Irish Cup was the 65th edition of the Irish Cup, the premier knock-out cup competition in Northern Irish football.

Linfield won the tournament for the 22nd time, defeating Glentoran 4–2 in the final at Celtic Park.

== Results ==
=== First round ===
Team 1	Agg.	Team 2	1st leg	2nd leg
Bangor	w/o^{1}	Glentoran II		
Bangor Reserves	3–6	Ards	2–3	1–3
Belfast Celtic	bye			
Cliftonville	bye			
Derry City	bye			
Distillery	bye			
Glentoran	bye			
Infantry Training Centre	bye			
Larne	bye			
Linfield	bye			

^{1} Glentoran II were awarded the tie as Bangor were expelled from the tournament for an infringement of the rules.

=== Second round ===
Team 1	Agg.	Team 2	1st leg	2nd leg
Ards	10–5	Infantry Training Centre	5–3	5–2
Larne	10–6	Glentoran II	6–2	4–4
Belfast Celtic	bye			
Cliftonville	bye			
Derry City	bye			
Distillery	bye			
Glentoran	bye			
Linfield	bye			

=== Quarter-finals ===
Team 1	Agg.	Team 2	1st leg	2nd leg
Derry City	8–2	Cliftonville	5–0	3–2
Distillery	7–5	Belfast Celtic	4–1	3–4
Larne	6–9	Glentoran	3–4	3–5
Linfield	10–0	Ards	8–0	2–0

=== Semi-finals ===
Team 1	Score	Team 2
Glentoran	3–0	Distillery
Linfield	4–0	Derry City

=== Final ===
14 April 1945

Linfield	4–2	Glentoran
Lockhart 10'; Cochrane 20'; McCrory 30', 89'	Report	Hill 13'; McIlvenny 52'

Celtic Park, Belfast
Attendance: 20,000
Referee: J. Ferguson
