= 1908–09 Irish Cup =

Tournament details
- Country: Ireland
- Date: 12 December 1908 – 10 April 1909
- Teams: 10

Final positions
- Champions: Cliftonville (7th win)
- Runners-up: Bohemians

Tournament statistics
- Matches played: 14
- Goals scored: 46 (3.29 per match)

The 1908–09 Irish Cup was the 29th edition of the Irish Cup, the premier knock-out cup competition in Irish football.

Cliftonville won the tournament for the 7th time, defeating Bohemians 2–1 in the final replay, after a 0–0 draw in the original final.

== Results ==
=== First round ===
Team 1	Score	Team 2
Glentoran	1–1	Derry Celtic
Shelbourne	2–2	Bohemians
Belfast Celtic	bye	
Cliftonville	bye	
Distillery	bye	
Dublin University	bye	
Linfield	bye	
St James's Gate	bye	

==== Replays ====
Team 1	Score	Team 2
Bohemians	1–0	Shelbourne
Derry Celtic	0–1	Glentoran

=== Quarter-finals ===
Team 1	Score	Team 2
Bohemians	10–2	St James's Gate
Cliftonville	w/o	Dublin University
Glentoran	1–1	Belfast Celtic
Linfield	0–4	Distillery

==== Replays ====
Team 1	Score	Team 2
Glentoran	2–0	Belfast Celtic

=== Semi-finals ===
Team 1	Score	Team 2
Bohemians	2–1	Glentoran
Cliftonville	2–0^{1}	Distillery

^{1} A replay was ordered after a protest.

==== Replay ====
Team 1	Score	Team 2
Cliftonville	2–3^{1}	Distillery

^{1} A replay was ordered after a protest.

==== Second replay ====
Team 1	Score	Team 2
Cliftonville	3–2	Distillery

=== Final ===
3 April 1909

Cliftonville	0–0	Bohemians
	Report

Windsor Park, Belfast

==== Replay ====
10 April 1909

Cliftonville	2–1	Bohemians
McAuley; McComb	Report	W. Hooper

Dalymount Park, Dublin
