= 1912–13 Irish Cup =

Tournament details
- Country: Ireland
- Date: 1 February 1913 – 29 March 1913
- Teams: 13

Final positions
- Champions: Linfield (10th win)
- Runners-up: Glentoran

Tournament statistics
- Matches played: 15
- Goals scored: 51 (3.4 per match)

The 1912–13 Irish Cup was the 33rd edition of the Irish Cup, the premier knock-out cup competition in Irish football.

Linfield won the tournament for the 10th time, defeating Glentoran 2–0 in the final.

== Results ==
=== First round ===
Team 1	Score	Team 2
Belfast Celtic	2–2	Distillery
Bohemians	1–2	Shelbourne
Derry Guilds	3–2	Derry Celtic
Dublin University	2–3	St James's Gate
Glenavon	1–2	Glentoran
Linfield	4–0	Cliftonville
Tritonville	bye	

==== Replay ====
Team 1	Score	Team 2
Distillery	1–1	Belfast Celtic

==== Second replay ====
Team 1	Score	Team 2
Belfast Celtic	1–0	Distillery

=== Quarter-finals ===
Team 1	Score	Team 2
Glentoran	0–0	Shelbourne
Linfield	4–0	Derry Guilds
Tritonville	5–1	St James's Gate
Belfast Celtic	bye	

==== Replay ====
Team 1	Score	Team 2
Shelbourne	0–1	Glentoran

=== Semifinals ===
Team 1	Score	Team 2
Glentoran	5–1	Belfast Celtic
Linfield	4–1	Tritonville

=== Final ===
29 March 1913

Linfield	2–0	Glentoran
McNeill; McEwan	Report

Celtic Park, Belfast
Attendance: 20,000
Referee: G. H. MacKenzie (Glasgow)
