= 1904–05 Irish Cup =

Tournament details
- Country: Ireland
- Date: 5 November 1904 – 11 March 1905
- Teams: 12

Final positions
- Champions: Distillery (8th win)
- Runners-up: Shelbourne

Tournament statistics
- Matches played: 12
- Goals scored: 40 (3.33 per match)

The 1904–05 Irish Cup was the 25th edition of the Irish Cup, the premier knock-out cup competition in Irish football.

Distillery won the tournament for the 8th time, defeating Shelbourne 3–0 in the final.

== Results ==
=== First round ===
Team 1	Score	Team 2
Belfast Celtic	0–2	Distillery
Bellevue	1–4	Shelbourne
Derry Celtic	3–1	Inniskilling Fusiliers
Glentoran	3–0	Cliftonville
Richmond Rovers	1–1	Bohemians
Cameron Highlanders	bye	
Linfield	bye	

==== Replay ====
Team 1	Score	Team 2
Bohemians	6–1	Richmond Rovers

=== Quarter-finals ===
Team 1	Score	Team 2
Derry Celtic	3–1	Linfield
Distillery	1–0	Cameron Highlanders
Shelbourne	2–1	Bohemians
Glentoran	bye	

=== Semi-finals ===
Team 1	Score	Team 2
Distillery	1–0	Derry Celtic
Shelbourne	4–1	Glentoran

=== Final ===
11 March 1905

Distillery	3–0	Shelbourne
Magill; Soye	Report

Solitude, Belfast
Attendance: 13,000
Referee: Tom Robertson (Glasgow)
