= 1945–46 Irish Cup =

Tournament details
- Country: Northern Ireland
- Teams: 10

Final positions
- Champions: Linfield (23rd win)
- Runners-up: Distillery

Tournament statistics
- Matches played: 16
- Goals scored: 55 (3.44 per match)

The 1945–46 Irish Cup was the 66th edition of the Irish Cup, the premier knock-out cup competition in Northern Irish football.

Linfield won the tournament for the 23rd time and the 2nd consecutive year, defeating Distillery 3–0 in the final at Celtic Park.

== Results ==
=== First round ===
Team 1	Agg.	Team 2	1st leg	2nd leg
Cliftonville	6–3	RAF Aldergrove	3–2	3–1
Glentoran	4–7	Belfast Celtic II	3–2	1–5
Ards II	bye			
Belfast Celtic	bye			
Derry City	bye			
Distillery	bye			
Linfield	bye			
Linfield Swifts	bye			

=== Quarter-finals ===
Team 1	Agg.	Team 2	1st leg	2nd leg
Belfast Celtic II	3–1	Cliftonville	0–0	3–1
Derry City	2–10	Belfast Celtic	0–3	2–7
Distillery	4–1	Linfield Swifts	2–1	2–0
Linfield	5–3	Ards II	2–0	3–3

=== Semi-finals ===
Team 1	Score	Team 2
Distillery	0–0	Belfast Celtic II
Linfield	2–0	Belfast Celtic

==== Replay ====
Team 1	Score	Team 2
Distillery	1–0	Belfast Celtic II

=== Final ===
13 April 1946

Linfield	3–0	Distillery
Walsh 35', 80'; McCrory 72'	Report

Celtic Park, Belfast
Attendance: 20,137
