= 1934–35 Irish Cup =

Tournament details
- Country: Northern Ireland
- Teams: 16

Final positions
- Champions: Glentoran (6th win)
- Runners-up: Larne

Tournament statistics
- Matches played: 16
- Goals scored: 72 (4.5 per match)

The 1934–35 Irish Cup was the 55th edition of the Irish Cup, the premier knock-out cup competition in Northern Irish football.

Glentoran won the tournament for the 6th time, defeating Larne 1–0 in the second final replay at Windsor Park, after the two previous matches had finished in a draw.

== Results ==
=== First round ===
Team 1	Score	Team 2
Belfast Celtic	3–1	Derry City
Belfast Celtic II	0–2	Linfield
Broadway United	1–5	Distillery
Cliftonville	0–1	Ballymena United
Glenavon	1–0	Newry Town
Glentoran	3–1	Ards
Larne	3–2	Coleraine
Portadown	5–1	Bangor

=== Quarter-finals ===
Team 1	Score	Team 2
Distillery	2–3	Ballymena United
Glentoran	4–2	Linfield
Larne	4–4	Newry Town
Portadown	0–2	Belfast Celtic

==== Replay ====
Team 1	Score	Team 2
Newry Town	2–2	Larne

==== Second replay ====
Team 1	Score	Team 2
Larne	2–0	Newry Town

=== Semi-finals ===
Team 1	Score	Team 2
Glentoran	3–1	Ballymena United
Larne	1–0	Belfast Celtic

=== Final ===
6 April 1935

Glentoran	0–0	Larne
	Report

Windsor Park, Belfast
Attendance: 15,000
Referee: T. Bentley (Manchester)

==== Replay ====
10 April 1935

Glentoran	0–0	Larne
	Report

Windsor Park, Belfast
Attendance: 8,000
Referee: T. Bentley (Manchester)

==== Second replay ====
30 April 1935

Glentoran	1–0	Larne
Goodwin 30'	Report

Windsor Park, Belfast
Attendance: 10,545
Referee: T. Bentley (Manchester)
