= 1916–17 Irish Cup =

Tournament details
- Country: Ireland
- Date: 3 February 1917 – 31 March 1917
- Teams: 12

Final positions
- Champions: Glentoran (2nd win)
- Runners-up: Belfast Celtic

Tournament statistics
- Matches played: 13
- Goals scored: 33 (2.54 per match)

The 1916–17 Irish Cup was the 37th edition of the Irish Cup, the premier knock-out cup competition in Irish football.

Glentoran won the tournament for the 2nd time, defeating Belfast Celtic 2–0 in the final.

== Results ==
=== First round ===
Team 1	Score	Team 2
Belfast United	0–1	Belfast Celtic
Bohemians	2–0	St James's Gate
Distillery	2–0	Dundela
Glenavon	0–3	Linfield
Glentoran	2–0	Cliftonville
Strandville	2–1	Shelbourne

=== Quarter-finals ===
Team 1	Score	Team 2
Bohemians	3–1	Strandville
Linfield	1–1	Belfast Celtic
Distillery	bye	
Glentoran	bye	

==== Replay ====
Team 1	Score	Team 2
Belfast Celtic	2–0	Linfield

=== Semi-finals ===
Team 1	Score	Team 2
Belfast Celtic	4–0	Bohemians
Glentoran	1–1	Distillery

==== Replay ====
Team 1	Score	Team 2
Glentoran	3–1	Distillery

=== Final ===
31 March 1917

Glentoran	2–0	Belfast Celtic
Seymour	Report

Windsor Park, Belfast
Referee: Mr Kelso (Glasgow)
