= 1979–80 Irish Cup =

Tournament details
- Country: Northern Ireland
- Teams: 16

Final positions
- Champions: Linfield (32nd win)
- Runners-up: Crusaders

Tournament statistics
- Matches played: 22
- Goals scored: 56 (2.55 per match)

The 1979–80 Irish Cup was the 100th edition of the Irish Cup, Northern Ireland's premier football knock-out cup competition. It began on 2 February 1980, and concluded on 26 April 1980 with the final.

The defending champions were Cliftonville, after they had won the cup for the 8th time the previous season, defeating Portadown 3–2 in the 1978–79 final. However, Portadown gained revenge by knocking the holders out in the first round with a 2–1 win. Linfield won the cup for the 32nd time, defeating Crusaders 2–0 in the final.

== Results ==
=== First round ===
Team 1	Score	Team 2
Bangor	2–0^{1}	Ballymena United
Cliftonville	1–2	Portadown
Coleraine	8–1	Ballyclare Comrades
Crusaders	1–0	Stranmillis College
Larne	0–2^{2}	Glentoran
Linfield	3–1	Distillery
Queen's University	0–4	Glenavon
RUC	4–0	Ards

^{1}This tie required a replay, after the first game ended as a 1–1 draw.
^{2}This tie required two replays, after the first games ended as 1–1 and 0–0 draws.

=== Quarter-finals ===
Team 1	Score	Team 2
Ballymena United	3–2	Portadown
Crusaders	3-0^{3}	Glenavon
Linfield	4–0	Glentoran
RUC	1–0^{4}	Coleraine

^{3}This tie required a replay, after the first game ended as a 0–0 draw at Glenavon.
^{4}This tie required two replays, after the first games ended as 1–1 and 0–0 draws.

=== Semi-finals ===
Team 1	Score	Team 2
Crusaders	2–1^{5}	RUC
Linfield	1–0	Ballymena United

^{5}This tie required a replay, after the first game ended as a 1–1 draw.

=== Final ===
26 April 1980

Linfield	2 – 0	Crusaders
McCurdy 12'; McKeown 68' (pen.)	Report

The Oval, Belfast
