= 1939–40 Irish Cup =

Tournament details
- Country: Northern Ireland
- Teams: 16

Final positions
- Champions: Ballymena United (1st win)
- Runners-up: Glenavon

Tournament statistics
- Matches played: 18
- Goals scored: 54 (3 per match)

The 1939–40 Irish Cup was the 60th edition of the Irish Cup, the premier knock-out cup competition in Northern Irish football.

Ballymena United won the tournament for the 1st time, defeating Glenavon 2–0 in the final at Windsor Park.

== Results ==
=== First round ===
Team 1	Score	Team 2
Ballymena United	3–1	Bangor
Belfast Celtic	2–0	Newry Town
Belfast Celtic II	3–0	Cliftonville
Coleraine	1–1	Dundela
Glenavon	2–1	Glentoran
Larne	3–0	Ards
Linfield	3–0	Distillery
Portadown	2–2	Derry City

==== Replay ====
Team 1	Score	Team 2
Derry City	1–1	Portadown
Dundela	3–1	Coleraine

==== Second replay ====
Team 1	Score	Team 2
Portadown	0–3	Derry City

=== Quarter-finals ===
Team 1	Score	Team 2
Ballymena United	3–2	Dundela
Belfast Celtic	3–0	Derry City
Belfast Celtic II	0–3	Glenavon
Larne	1–2	Linfield

=== Semi-finals ===
Team 1	Score	Team 2
Ballymena United	2–0	Belfast Celtic
Glenavon	2–0	Linfield

=== Final ===
20 April 1940

Ballymena United	2–0	Glenavon
Moore 40'; Sclater 53'	Report

Windsor Park, Belfast
Referee: D. Maxwell (Belfast)
