= 1921–22 Irish Cup =

Tournament details
- Country: Northern Ireland
- Date: 28 January 1922 – 25 March 1922
- Teams: 8

Final positions
- Champions: Linfield (14th win)
- Runners-up: Glenavon

Tournament statistics
- Matches played: 9
- Goals scored: 24 (2.67 per match)

The 1921–22 Irish Cup was the 42nd edition of the Irish Cup, the premier knock-out cup competition in Northern Irish football.

Linfield won the tournament for the 14th time, defeating Glenavon 2–1 in the final at The Oval. This was the first edition of the tournament in which teams solely from Northern Ireland could participate.

== Results ==
=== Quarter-finals ===
Team 1	Score	Team 2
Distillery	1–5	Linfield
Glenavon	1–0	Glentoran
Linfield Rangers	3–1	Forth River
Queen's Island	1–1	Cliftonville

==== Replay ====
Team 1	Score	Team 2
Cliftonville	1–1	Queen's Island

==== Second replay ====
Team 1	Score	Team 2
Queen's Island	2–0	Cliftonville

=== Semi-finals ===
Team 1	Score	Team 2
Glenavon	2–1	Linfield Rangers
Linfield	1–0	Queen's Island

=== Final ===
25 March 1922

Linfield	2–1	Glenavon
Savage; McCracken	Report	Boyd

The Oval, Belfast
Attendance: 5,000
Referee: Sam Thompson
