= 1975–76 Irish Cup =

Tournament details
- Country: Northern Ireland
- Teams: 16

Final positions
- Champions: Carrick Rangers (1st win)
- Runners-up: Linfield

Tournament statistics
- Matches played: 21
- Goals scored: 72 (3.43 per match)

The 1975–76 Irish Cup was the 96th edition of the Irish Cup, the premier knock-out cup competition in Northern Irish football.

Carrick Rangers won the cup for the 1st time, defeating Linfield 2–1 in the final at The Oval and becoming only the third (and to the date, the most recent) non-senior side to win the cup.

The holders Coleraine were eliminated in the quarter-finals by Carrick.

== Results ==
=== First round ===
Team 1	Score	Team 2
Ards	1–0	Dundela
Ballymena United	2–3	Carrick Rangers
Crusaders	3–0	Omagh Town
Distillery	0–2	Glentoran
Larne	2–2	Glenavon
Limavady United	0–1	Cliftonville
Linfield	4–2	Bangor
Portadown	0–0	Coleraine

==== Replay ====
Team 1	Score	Team 2
Coleraine	1–0	Portadown
Glenavon	1–2	Larne

=== Quarter-finals ===
Team 1	Score	Team 2
Ards	1–1	Linfield
Coleraine	1–1	Carrick Rangers
Glentoran	3–1	Cliftonville
Larne	3–2	Crusaders

==== Replay ====
Team 1	Score	Team 2
Carrick Rangers	3–3	Coleraine
Linfield	7–1	Ards

==== Second replay ====
Team 1	Score	Team 2
Carrick Rangers	2–1	Coleraine

=== Semi-finals ===
Team 1	Score	Team 2
Carrick Rangers	3–3	Larne
Linfield	2–0	Glentoran

==== Replay ====
Team 1	Score	Team 2
Carrick Rangers	3–2	Larne

=== Final ===
10 April 1976

Carrick Rangers	2–1	Linfield
Prenter 25', 64'	Report	Malone 1'

The Oval, Belfast
Attendance: 9,000
