= 1971–72 Irish Cup =

Tournament details
- Country: Northern Ireland
- Teams: 16

Final positions
- Champions: Coleraine (2nd win)
- Runners-up: Portadown

Tournament statistics
- Matches played: 17
- Goals scored: 52 (3.06 per match)

The 1971–72 Irish Cup was the 92nd edition of the Irish Cup, the premier knock-out cup competition in Northern Irish football.

Coleraine won the cup for the 2nd time, defeating Portadown 2–1 in the final at Windsor Park.

The holders Distillery were eliminated in the first round by Coleraine.

== Results ==
=== First round ===
Team 1	Score	Team 2
Bangor	0–1	Ards
Coleraine	7–1	Distillery
Crusaders	1–0	Ballymena United
Derry City	1–0	Ballyclare Comrades
Glentoran	5–1	Ards Rangers
Linfield	5–0	Glenavon
Portadown	3–0	Cliftonville
Queen's University	1–0	Chimney Corner

=== Quarter-finals ===
Team 1	Score	Team 2
Crusaders	1–1	Ards
Glentoran	2–3	Coleraine
Portadown	2–0	Linfield
Queen's University	2–4	Derry City

==== Replay ====
Team 1	Score	Team 2
Ards	3–0	Crusaders

=== Semi-finals ===
Team 1	Score	Team 2
Coleraine	1–1	Ards
Portadown	2–0	Derry City

==== Replay ====
Team 1	Score	Team 2
Coleraine	1–0	Ards

=== Final ===
22 April 1972

Coleraine	2–1	Portadown
Dickson 72'; Murray 87'	Report	Anderson 81'

Windsor Park, Belfast
Attendance: 8,000
Referee: H. Wilson (Belfast)
