= 1953–54 Irish Cup =

Tournament details
- Country: Northern Ireland
- Teams: 16

Final positions
- Champions: Derry City (2nd win)
- Runners-up: Glentoran

Tournament statistics
- Matches played: 21
- Goals scored: 66 (3.14 per match)

The 1953–54 Irish Cup was the 74th edition of the Irish Cup, the premier knock-out cup competition in Northern Irish football.

Derry City won the cup for the 2nd time, defeating Glentoran 1–0 in the second final replay at Windsor Park after the previous two matches ended in draws.

Linfield were the holders but they were defeated 2–1 by Derry in the semi-final replay.

== Results ==
=== First round ===
Team 1	Score	Team 2
Ards	4–0	Carrick Rangers
Ballymena United Reserves	3–2	Ballyclare Comrades
Cliftonville	0–2	Bangor
Derry City	1–0	Ballymena United
Distillery	3–2	Crusaders
Glenavon	1–2	Coleraine
Larne	2–2	Glentoran
Linfield	3–1	Portadown

==== Replay ====
Team 1	Score	Team 2
Glentoran	2–0	Larne

=== Quarter-finals ===
Team 1	Score	Team 2
Coleraine	2–2	Distillery
Derry City	1–1	Bangor
Ards	0-4	Glentoran
Linfield	2–0	Ballymena United Reserves

==== Replay ====
Team 1	Score	Team 2
Distillery	1–0	Coleraine
Derry City	2–0	Bangor

=== Semi-finals ===
Team 1	Score	Team 2
Derry City	2–2	Linfield
Glentoran	2–1	Distillery

==== Replay ====
Team 1	Score	Team 2
Derry City	2–1	Linfield

=== Final ===
24 April 1954

Derry City	2–2	Glentoran
Delaney 31'; Forsythe 37'	Report	Cunningham 7'; Feeney 71'

Windsor Park, Belfast
Attendance: 35,000
Referee: A. Holland (Barnsley)

==== Replay ====
29 April 1954

Derry City	0–0	Glentoran
	Report

Windsor Park, Belfast
Attendance: 30,827

==== Second replay ====
10 May 1954

Derry City	1–0	Glentoran
O'Neill 43'	Report

Windsor Park, Belfast
Attendance: 28,000
