= 1941–42 Irish Cup =

Tournament details
- Country: Northern Ireland
- Teams: 14

Final positions
- Champions: Linfield (21st win)
- Runners-up: Glentoran

Tournament statistics
- Matches played: 23
- Goals scored: 98 (4.26 per match)

The 1941–42 Irish Cup was the 62nd edition of the Irish Cup, the premier knock-out cup competition in Northern Irish football.

Linfield won the tournament for the 21st time, defeating Glentoran 3–1 in the final at Celtic Park.

== Results ==
=== First round ===
Team 1	Agg.	Team 2	1st leg	2nd leg
Bangor	3–7	Ards	3–2	0–5
Bangor Reserves	7–4	Sirocco Works	6–0	1–4
Distillery	3–2	Belfast Celtic	1–0	2–2
Larne	1–5	Glentoran	1–3	0–2
Linfield	6–1	Derry City	4–0	2–1
Royal Ulster Rifles	4–11	Cliftonville	2–4	2–7
Inniskilling Fusiliers	bye			
Royal Irish Fusiliers	bye			

=== Quarter-finals ===
Team 1	Agg.	Team 2	1st leg	2nd leg
Bangor Reserves	2–8	Ards	1–4	1–4
Cliftonville	0–7	Distillery	0–3	0–4
Glentoran	4–2	Royal Irish Fusiliers	4–0	0–2
Linfield	9–2	Inniskilling Fusiliers	5–1	4–1

=== Semi-finals ===
Team 1	Score	Team 2
Glentoran	2–0	Ards
Linfield	6–0	Distillery

=== Final ===
18 April 1942

Linfield	3–1	Glentoran
Thompson 10', 35'; Peppitt 16'	Report	Keddie 11'

Celtic Park, Belfast
Referee: P. Morris
