= 1926–27 Irish Cup =

Tournament details
- Country: Northern Ireland
- Teams: 14

Final positions
- Champions: Ards (1st win)
- Runners-up: Cliftonville

Tournament statistics
- Matches played: 13
- Goals scored: 56 (4.31 per match)

The 1926–27 Irish Cup was the 47th edition of the Irish Cup, the premier knock-out cup competition in Northern Irish football.

Ards won the tournament for the 1st time, defeating Cliftonville 3–2 in the final at The Oval.

== Results ==
=== First round ===
| Team 1 | Score | Team 2 |
|---|---|---|
| Belfast Celtic | 2–1 | Queen's Island |
| Cliftonville | 3–0 | Linfield |
| Crusaders | 3–1 | Distillery |
| Larne | 5–2 | Glentoran |
| Linfield Rangers | 4–0 | Barn |
| Newry Town | 1–2 | Ards |
| Portadown | 3–4 | Glenavon |

=== Quarter-finals ===
| Team 1 | Score | Team 2 |
|---|---|---|
| Belfast Celtic | 4–0 | Linfield Rangers |
| Glenavon | 1–2 | Ards |
| Larne | 1–2 | Crusaders |
| Cliftonville | bye | |

=== Semi-finals ===
| Team 1 | Score | Team 2 |
|---|---|---|
| Ards | 3–1 | Belfast Celtic |
| Cliftonville | 4–2 | Crusaders |

=== Final ===
26 March 1927

| Ards | 3–2 | Cliftonville |
|---|---|---|
| McGee; McIlreavy | Report | Mortishead; Hughes |

The Oval, Belfast
Referee: J.B. Stark
