= 1918–19 Irish Cup =

Tournament details
- Country: Ireland
- Date: 1 February 1919 – 7 April 1919
- Teams: 10

Final positions
- Champions: Linfield (13th win)
- Runners-up: Glentoran

Tournament statistics
- Matches played: 12
- Goals scored: 30 (2.5 per match)

The 1918–19 Irish Cup was the 39th edition of the Irish Cup, the premier knock-out cup competition in Irish football.

Linfield won the tournament for the 13th time, defeating Glentoran 2–1 in the second final replay after the previous two matches had ended in draws.

== Results ==
=== First round ===
Team 1	Score	Team 2
Belfast Celtic	2–0	Cliftonville
Belfast United	2–0	Distillery
Glentoran	4–0	Bangor
Linfield	2–2	Distillery II
Shelbourne	4–0	Bohemians

==== Replay ====
Team 1	Score	Team 2
Distillery II	0–1	Linfield

=== Quarter-finals ===
Team 1	Score	Team 2
Distillery	0–4	Linfield
Belfast Celtic	bye	
Glentoran	bye	
Shelbourne	bye	

=== Semi-finals ===
Team 1	Score	Team 2
Glentoran	2–0	Belfast Celtic
Linfield	2–0	Shelbourne

=== Final ===
29 March 1919

Linfield	1–1	Glentoran
Featherstone	Report	Lyner

Celtic Park, Belfast
Referee: Bill Kelly

==== Replay ====
5 April 1919

Linfield	0–0	Glentoran
	Report

Grosvenor Park, Belfast
Attendance: 18,000
Referee: Bill Kelly

==== Second replay ====
7 April 1919

Linfield	2–1	Glentoran
McEwan	Report	Scraggs

Solitude, Belfast
Referee: Hugh Rodgers
