= 1900–01 Irish Cup =

Tournament details
- Country: Ireland
- Date: 27 October 1900 – 13 April 1901
- Teams: 17

Final positions
- Champions: Cliftonville (5th win)
- Runners-up: Freebooters

Tournament statistics
- Matches played: 13
- Goals scored: 61 (4.69 per match)

The 1900–01 Irish Cup was the 21st edition of the Irish Cup, the premier knock-out cup competition in Irish football.

Cliftonville won the tournament for the 5th time and 2nd year in a row, defeating Freebooters 1–0 in the final.

== Results ==
=== First round ===
Team 1	Score	Team 2
Derry Hibernians	w/o	Bright Stars
Distillery	0–1	Cliftonville
Freebooters	10–0	Dundalk
Glentoran	0–3	Celtic
Richmond Rovers	w/o	Dublin University
St Columb's Court	1–8	Derry Celtic
Tritonville	2–5	Bohemians
Linfield	bye	
North End	bye	
Shelbourne	bye	

=== Second round ===
Team 1	Score	Team 2
Bohemians	1–4	Linfield
Cliftonville	4–1	Derry Hibernians
Derry Celtic	w/o	Shelbourne
Freebooters	3–1	Richmond Rovers
North End	w/o	Celtic

=== Quarter-finals ===
Team 1	Score	Team 2
Cliftonville	2–0^{1}	Celtic
Derry Celtic	bye	
Freebooters	bye	
Linfield	bye	

^{1} A replay was ordered after a protest.

==== Replay ====
Team 1	Score	Team 2
Cliftonville	4–2	Celtic

=== Semi-finals ===
Team 1	Score	Team 2
Cliftonville	3–1	Derry Celtic
Freebooters	2–1	Linfield

=== Final ===
13 April 1901

Cliftonville	1–0	Freebooters
Scott 23'	Report

Grosvenor Park, Belfast
Referee: Tom Robertson (Glasgow)
