= 1951–52 Irish Cup =

Tournament details
- Country: Northern Ireland
- Teams: 16

Final positions
- Champions: Ards (2nd win)
- Runners-up: Glentoran

Tournament statistics
- Matches played: 25
- Goals scored: 84 (3.36 per match)

The 1951–52 Irish Cup was the 72nd edition of the Irish Cup, the premier knock-out cup competition in Northern Irish football.

Ards won the cup for the 2nd time, defeating the holders Glentoran 1–0 in the final at Windsor Park.

== Results ==
=== First round ===
Team 1	Score	Team 2
Ards	2–1	Larne
Ballymena United	2–2	Distillery
Brantwood	4–2	Derry City
Cliftonville	7–1	Seapatrick
Glenavon	2–2	Crusaders
Glentoran	1–0	Bangor
Linfield	5–1	Ballyclare Comrades
Portadown	4–2	Coleraine

==== Replay ====
Team 1	Score	Team 2
Crusaders	2–2	Glenavon
Distillery	1–1	Ballymena United

==== Second replay ====
Team 1	Score	Team 2
Ballymena United	2–0	Distillery
Glenavon	4–1	Crusaders

=== Quarter-finals ===
Team 1	Score	Team 2
Brantwood	0–1	Ards
Cliftonville	2–2	Ballymena United
Glentoran	3–0	Glenavon
Linfield	3–3	Portadown

==== Replay ====
Team 1	Score	Team 2
Ballymena United	2–0	Cliftonville
Portadown	1–1	Linfield

==== Second replay ====
Team 1	Score	Team 2
Linfield	4–1	Portadown

=== Semi-finals ===
Team 1	Score	Team 2
Ards	3–1	Ballymena United
Glentoran	0–0	Linfield

==== Replay ====
Team 1	Score	Team 2
Glentoran	2–2	Linfield

==== Second replay ====
Team 1	Score	Team 2
Glentoran	0–0 (a.e.t)	Linfield

==== Third replay ====
Team 1	Score	Team 2
Glentoran	1–0	Linfield

=== Final ===
26 April 1952

Ards	1–0	Glentoran
Thomson 63'	Report

Windsor Park, Belfast
Attendance: 23,000
