= 1915–16 Irish Cup =

Tournament details
- Country: Ireland
- Date: 29 January 1916 – 1 April 1916
- Teams: 10

Final positions
- Champions: Linfield (12th win)
- Runners-up: Glentoran

Tournament statistics
- Matches played: 11
- Goals scored: 30 (2.73 per match)

The 1915–16 Irish Cup was the 36th edition of the Irish Cup, the premier knock-out cup competition in Irish football.

Linfield won the tournament for the 12th time and the 2nd consecutive year, defeating Glentoran 1–0 in the final.

== Results ==
=== First round ===
Team 1	Score	Team 2
Belfast United	1–0^{1}	Linfield
Bohemians	4–0	St James's Gate
Cliftonville	1–2	Belfast Celtic
Distillery	5–3	Glenavon
Glentoran	bye	
Shelbourne	bye	

^{1} Linfield were awarded victory after Belfast United played an ineligible player.

=== Quarter-finals ===
Team 1	Score	Team 2
Distillery	0–3	Glentoran
Shelbourne	0–0	Bohemians
Belfast Celtic	bye	
Linfield	bye	

==== Replay ====
Team 1	Score	Team 2
Bohemians	1–0	Shelbourne

=== Semi-finals ===
Team 1	Score	Team 2
Belfast Celtic	0–1	Linfield
Glentoran	4–2	Bohemians

=== Final ===
25 March 1916

Linfield	1–1	Glentoran
Clifford	Report	Ferritt (pen.)

Celtic Park, Belfast
Referee: Mr Baker (Crewe)

==== Replay ====
1 April 1916

Linfield	1–0	Glentoran
Nixon	Report

Grosvenor Park, Belfast
Referee: Mr Kelso (Glasgow)
