= 1952–53 Irish Cup =

Tournament details
- Country: Northern Ireland
- Teams: 16

Final positions
- Champions: Linfield (26th win)
- Runners-up: Coleraine

Tournament statistics
- Matches played: 18
- Goals scored: 66 (3.67 per match)

The 1952–53 Irish Cup was the 73rd edition of the Irish Cup, the premier knock-out cup competition in Northern Irish football.

Ards were the holders but they were defeated 5–4 by Glentoran in the quarter-finals.

Linfield won the cup for the 26th time, defeating Coleraine 5–0 in the final at Solitude.

== Results ==
=== First round ===
Team 1	Score	Team 2
Ards	6–2	Distillery
Bangor	2–1	Monkstown
Cliftonville	2–6	Glentoran
Coleraine	0–0	Ballymena United
Derry City	1–3	Crusaders
Glenavon	1–3	Linfield
Portadown	2–1	Brantwood
Shorts	0–0	Glentoran II

==== Replay ====
Team 1	Score	Team 2
Ballymena United	2–2	Coleraine
Glentoran II	1–0	Shorts

==== Second replay ====
Team 1	Score	Team 2
Coleraine	2–1	Ballymena United

=== Quarter-finals ===
Team 1	Score	Team 2
Ards	4–5	Glentoran
Crusaders	0–1	Coleraine
Glentoran II	2–0	Bangor
Portadown	1–2	Linfield

=== Semi-finals ===
Team 1	Score	Team 2
Coleraine	5–0	Glentoran II
Linfield	2–1	Glentoran

=== Final ===
25 April 1953

Linfield	5–0	Coleraine
Walker 28'; Thompson 41', 85' (pen.); McDowell 57'; Dickson 77'	Report

Solitude, Belfast
Attendance: 21,000
Referee: Charlie Faultless (Glasgow)
