= 1969–70 Irish Cup =

Tournament details
- Country: Northern Ireland
- Teams: 16

Final positions
- Champions: Linfield (30th win)
- Runners-up: Ballymena United

Tournament statistics
- Matches played: 20
- Goals scored: 55 (2.75 per match)

The 1969–70 Irish Cup was the 90th edition of the Irish Cup, the premier knock-out cup competition in Northern Irish football.

Linfield won the cup for the 30th time, defeating Ballymena United 2–1 in the final at Solitude.

The holders Ards were eliminated in the first round by Crusaders. To date, this was the final Irish Cup final to be held at Solitude.

== Results ==
=== First round ===
Team 1	Score	Team 2
Ards	0–1	Crusaders
Bangor	0–0	Coleraine
Chimney Corner	1–2	Newry Town
Derry City	2–1	Dundela
East Belfast	1–2	Cliftonville
Glenavon	3–3	Distillery
Glentoran	0–2	Ballymena United
Linfield	1–0	Portadown

==== Replay ====
Team 1	Score	Team 2
Coleraine	2–1	Bangor
Distillery	2–2	Glenavon

==== Second replay ====
Team 1	Score	Team 2
Glenavon	2–1	Distillery

=== Quarter-finals ===
Team 1	Score	Team 2
Ballymena United	2–1	Crusaders
Derry City	1–1	Cliftonville
Glenavon	2–4	Coleraine
Newry Town	0–2	Linfield

==== Replay ====
Team 1	Score	Team 2
Cliftonville	0–0	Derry City

==== Second replay ====
Team 1	Score	Team 2
Derry City	3–2 (a.e.t.)	Cliftonville

=== Semi-finals ===
Team 1	Score	Team 2
Ballymena United	2–0	Coleraine
Linfield	2–1	Derry City

=== Final ===
4 April 1970

Linfield	2–1	Ballymena United
Scott 11', 49'	Report	Fleming 2'

Solitude, Belfast
Attendance: 12,000
Referee: M. Fussey (Retford)
