= 1907–08 Irish Cup =

Tournament details
- Country: Ireland
- Date: 2 November 1907 – 28 March 1908
- Teams: 9

Final positions
- Champions: Bohemians (1st win)
- Runners-up: Shelbourne

Tournament statistics
- Matches played: 13
- Goals scored: 36 (2.77 per match)

The 1907–08 Irish Cup was the 28th edition of the Irish Cup, the premier knock-out cup competition in Irish football.

Bohemians won the tournament for the 1st time, defeating Shelbourne 3–1 in the final replay, after a 1–1 draw in the original final. This was the first Irish Cup final that did not feature a team from Belfast.

== Results ==
=== First round ===
Team 1	Score	Team 2
Glentoran	2–2	Bohemians
Belfast Celtic	bye	
Cliftonville	bye	
Distillery	bye	
Derry Celtic	bye	
Linfield	bye	
Reginald	bye	
Shelbourne	bye	

==== Replay ====
Team 1	Score	Team 2
Bohemians	4–1	Glentoran

=== Quarter-finals ===
Team 1	Score	Team 2
Belfast Celtic	w/o	Reginald
Bohemians	2–2	Linfield
Distillery	2–0	Derry Celtic
Shelbourne	1–1	Cliftonville

==== Replays ====
Team 1	Score	Team 2
Bohemians	2–1	Linfield
Shelbourne	2–0	Cliftonville

=== Semi-finals ===
Team 1	Score	Team 2
Bohemians	2–2	Belfast Celtic
Shelbourne	0–0	Distillery

==== Replays ====
Team 1	Score	Team 2
Bohemians	2–0	Belfast Celtic
Shelbourne	2–0	Distillery

=== Final ===
21 March 1908

Bohemians	1–1	Shelbourne
Sloan	Report	Lacey

Dalymount Park, Dublin

==== Replay ====
28 March 1908

Bohemians	3–1	Shelbourne
R. Hooper; W. Hooper	Report	James Owens

Dalymount Park, Dublin
