= 1968–69 Irish Cup =

Tournament details
- Country: Northern Ireland
- Teams: 16

Final positions
- Champions: Ards (3rd win)
- Runners-up: Distillery

Tournament statistics
- Matches played: 21
- Goals scored: 58 (2.76 per match)

The 1968–69 Irish Cup was the 89th edition of the Irish Cup, the premier knock-out cup competition in Northern Irish football.

Ards won the cup for the 3rd time, defeating Distillery 4–2 in the final replay at Windsor Park after the first game ended in a draw.

The holders Crusaders were eliminated in the quarter-finals by Ards.

== Results ==
=== First round ===
| Team 1 | Score | Team 2 |
|---|---|---|
| Ballymena United | 2–0 | Carrick Rangers |
| Bangor | 1–1 | Glenavon |
| Cliftonville | 0–3 | Distillery |
| Coleraine | 1–0 | Larne |
| Crusaders | 6–1 | Banbridge Town |
| Derry City | 3–0 | Queen's University |
| Linfield | 2–2 | Glentoran |
| Portadown | 0–1 | Ards |

==== Replay ====
| Team 1 | Score | Team 2 |
|---|---|---|
| Glenavon | 2–2 | Bangor |
| Glentoran | 2–0 | Linfield |

==== Second replay ====
| Team 1 | Score | Team 2 |
|---|---|---|
| Bangor | 3–0 | Glenavon |

=== Quarter-finals ===
| Team 1 | Score | Team 2 |
|---|---|---|
| Ards | 4–1 | Crusaders |
| Ballymena United | 1–2 | Distillery |
| Bangor | 0–1 | Coleraine |
| Glentoran | 3–2 | Derry City |

=== Semi-finals ===
| Team 1 | Score | Team 2 |
|---|---|---|
| Ards | 1–0 | Coleraine |
| Distillery | 1–1 | Glentoran |

==== Replay ====
| Team 1 | Score | Team 2 |
|---|---|---|
| Distillery | 0–0 | Glentoran |

==== Second replay ====
| Team 1 | Score | Team 2 |
|---|---|---|
| Distillery | 2–1 | Glentoran |

=== Final ===
19 April 1969

| Ards | 0–0 | Distillery |
|---|---|---|
| | Report |

Windsor Park, Belfast
Attendance: 17,000
Referee: Malcolm Wright (Portadown)

==== Replay ====
23 April 1969

| Ards | 4–2 (a.e.t.) | Distillery |
|---|---|---|
| McAvoy 48', 59', 104', 108' | Report | McCaffrey 40'; Conlon 49' |

Windsor Park, Belfast
Attendance: 16,000
Referee: Malcolm Wright (Portadown)
