= 1958–59 Irish Cup =

Tournament details
- Country: Northern Ireland
- Teams: 16

Final positions
- Champions: Glenavon (2nd win)
- Runners-up: Ballymena United

Tournament statistics
- Matches played: 19
- Goals scored: 82 (4.32 per match)

The 1958–59 Irish Cup was the 79th edition of the Irish Cup, the premier knock-out cup competition in Northern Irish football.

Glenavon won the cup for the 2nd time, defeating the holders Ballymena United 2–0 in the final replay at Windsor Park after the first match had finished in a draw.

== Results ==
=== First round ===
Team 1	Score	Team 2
Ards	3–1	Bangor
Ballymena United	4–2	Coleraine
Crusaders	2–4	Distillery
Derry City	3–0	Lambeg Bleachers & Dryers
Glenavon	4–2	Glentoran
Glentoran II	3–3	Cliftonville
Linfield	9–3	Dunmurry Recreation
Portadown	7–2	Larne

==== Replay ====
Team 1	Score	Team 2
Cliftonville	1–1	Glentoran II

==== Second replay ====
Team 1	Score	Team 2
Glentoran II	3–0	Cliftonville

=== Quarter-finals ===
Team 1	Score	Team 2
Distillery	1–0	Derry City
Glenavon	2–0	Glentoran II
Linfield	4–2	Ards
Portadown	1–1	Ballymena United

==== Replay ====
Team 1	Score	Team 2
Ballymena United	1–0	Portadown

=== Semi-finals ===
Team 1	Score	Team 2
Ballymena United	2–1	Linfield
Distillery	1–5	Glenavon

=== Final ===
18 April 1959

Glenavon	1–1	Ballymena United
Jones 78'	Report	Lowry 65' (pen.)

Windsor Park, Belfast
Attendance: 18,000

==== Replay ====
29 April 1959

Glenavon	2–0	Ballymena United
Wilson 40'; Magee 63'	Report

Windsor Park, Belfast
Attendance: 15,000
