= 1927–28 Irish Cup =

Tournament details
- Country: Northern Ireland
- Teams: 16

Final positions
- Champions: Willowfield (1st win)
- Runners-up: Larne

Tournament statistics
- Matches played: 19
- Goals scored: 70 (3.68 per match)

The 1927–28 Irish Cup was the 48th edition of the Irish Cup, the premier knock-out cup competition in Northern Irish football.

Willowfield won the tournament for the 1st and only time in their history, defeating Larne 1–0 in the final replay at Windsor Park after the first match ended in a 1–1 draw.

Willowfield became the first junior side to win the Irish Cup, a feat which has to date only been repeated by Dundela (1955) and Carrick Rangers (1976).

== Results ==
=== First round ===
Team 1	Score	Team 2
Barn	3–2	Bangor
Cliftonville	3–1	Glenavon
Coleraine	5–2	Linfield
Distillery	2–1	Glentoran
Linfield Rangers	3–3	Larne
Newry Town	1–2	Willowfield
Portadown	1–0	Ards
Queen's Island	1–7	Belfast Celtic

==== Replay ====
Team 1	Score	Team 2
Larne	3–3	Linfield Rangers

==== Second replay ====
Team 1	Score	Team 2
Larne	2–0	Linfield Rangers

=== Quarter-finals ===
Team 1	Score	Team 2
Cliftonville	1–2	Belfast Celtic
Larne	2–0	Distillery
Portadown	2–1	Coleraine
Willowfield	4–2	Barn

=== Semi-finals ===
Team 1	Score	Team 2
Larne	2–1	Portadown
Willowfield	1–1	Belfast Celtic

==== Replay ====
Team 1	Score	Team 2
Willowfield	2–1	Belfast Celtic

=== Final ===
31 March 1928

Willowfield	1–1	Larne
Kimlin 41'	Report	Crooks 84'

Windsor Park, Belfast
Referee: W. McLean

==== Replay ====
25 April 1928

Willowfield	1–0	Larne
Aiken 30' (pen.)	Report

Windsor Park, Belfast
Attendance: 12,000
Referee: W. McLean
