= 1942–43 Irish Cup =

Tournament details
- Country: Northern Ireland
- Teams: 12

Final positions
- Champions: Belfast Celtic (6th win)
- Runners-up: Glentoran

Tournament statistics
- Matches played: 18
- Goals scored: 91 (5.06 per match)

The 1942–43 Irish Cup was the 63rd edition of the Irish Cup, the premier knock-out cup competition in Northern Irish football.

Belfast Celtic won the tournament for the 6th time, defeating Glentoran 1–0 in the final at Windsor Park.

== Results ==
=== First round ===
Team 1	Agg.	Team 2	1st leg	2nd leg
Bangor	4–11	Glentoran	2–3	2–8
Cliftonville	2–5	Alexander Works	0–1	2–4
Derry City	2–5	Belfast Celtic	2–2	0–3
Distillery	5–5	Linfield	1–4	1–0
Ards	bye			
Infantry Training Centre	bye			
Larne	bye			
Royal Irish Fusiliers	bye			

==== Playoff ====
Team 1	Score	Team 2
Linfield	4–2	Distillery

=== Quarter-finals ===
Team 1	Agg.	Team 2	1st leg	2nd leg
Alexander Works	3–5	Belfast Celtic	1–2	2–3
Ards	7–1	Infantry Training Centre	2–1	5–0
Glentoran	15–2	Royal Irish Fusiliers	7–2	8–0
Larne	w/o^{1}	Distillery		

^{1} Larne were awarded the tie and Distillery were expelled from the tournament for playing an ineligible player in the previous round.

=== Semi-finals ===
Team 1	Score	Team 2
Belfast Celtic	4–2	Larne
Glentoran	4–2	Ards

=== Final ===
17 April 1943

Belfast Celtic	1–0	Glentoran
Hollinger 29'	Report

Windsor Park, Belfast
Referee: J. Ferguson
