= 1924–25 Irish Cup =

Tournament details
- Country: Northern Ireland
- Teams: 14

Final positions
- Champions: Distillery (10th win)
- Runners-up: Glentoran

Tournament statistics
- Matches played: 20
- Goals scored: 44 (2.2 per match)

The 1924–25 Irish Cup was the 45th edition of the Irish Cup, the premier knock-out cup competition in Northern Irish football.

Distillery won the tournament for the 10th time, defeating Glentoran 2–1 in the final at Solitude.

== Results ==
=== First round ===
Team 1	Score	Team 2
Distillery	1–1	Queen's Island
Barn	1–0	Cliftonville
Belfast Celtic	3–1	Ards
Crusaders	3–0	Larne
Linfield	0–0	Glenavon
Newry Town	1–0	Linfield Rangers
Portadown	0–1	Glentoran

==== Replay ====
Team 1	Score	Team 2
Queen's Island	1–4	Distillery
Glenavon	0–0	Linfield

==== Second replay ====
Team 1	Score	Team 2
Linfield	2–2	Glenavon

==== Third replay ====
Team 1	Score	Team 2
Glenavon	2–1	Linfield

=== Quarter-finals ===
Team 1	Score	Team 2
Crusaders	2–0	Belfast Celtic
Distillery	0–0	Barn
Glentoran	5–3	Newry Town
Glenavon	bye	

==== Replay ====
Team 1	Score	Team 2
Barn	1–1	Distillery

==== Second replay ====
Team 1	Score	Team 2
Distillery	1–0	Barn

=== Semi-finals ===
Team 1	Score	Team 2
Distillery	2–0	Glenavon
Glentoran	2–0	Crusaders

=== Final ===
21 March 1925

Distillery	2–1	Glentoran
McKenzie; Burnison (pen.)	Report	Burns

Solitude, Belfast
Attendance: 20,000
Referee: J.B. Stark
