= 1910–11 Irish Cup =

31st edition of the Irish Cup

Tournament details
- Country: Ireland
- Date: 28 January 1911 – 15 April 1911
- Teams: 9

Final positions
- Champions: Shelbourne (2nd win)
- Runners-up: Bohemians

Tournament statistics
- Matches played: 15
- Goals scored: 35 (2.33 per match)

The 1910–11 Irish Cup was the 31st edition of the Irish Cup, the premier knock-out cup competition in Irish football.

Shelbourne won the tournament for the 2nd time, defeating Bohemians 2–1 in the final replay after a 0–0 draw in the original final.

== Results ==
=== First round ===
Team 1	Score	Team 2
Distillery	1–1	Derry Celtic
Cliftonville	1–0	Belfast Celtic
St James's Gate	0–0	Shelbourne
Bohemians	w/o^{1}	Glentoran
Linfield	bye	

^{1} Glentoran originally won the tie played at Bohemians 1–0, but Bohemians protested after Glentoran played a player who was not on the pre-match teamsheet. Glentoran were subsequently expelled from the competition and Bohemians were reinstated.

==== Replays ====
Team 1	Score	Team 2
Derry Celtic	1–1	Distillery
Shelbourne	3–0	St James's Gate

==== Second replay ====
Team 1	Score	Team 2
Distillery	1–1	Derry Celtic

==== Third replay ====
Team 1	Score	Team 2
Derry Celtic	3–1	Distillery

=== Second round ===
Team 1	Score	Team 2
Derry Celtic	w/o^{1}	Linfield
Bohemians	bye	
Cliftonville	bye	
Shelbourne	bye	

^{1} Linfield originally won the tie played at Derry Celtic 3–2, but a replay was ordered after a protest by Derry Celtic that the pitch was unplayable and that the correct kick-off time was not adhered to by the referee. Linfield refused to play a replay and subsequently withdrew from the competition with Derry Celtic advancing to the semi-finals.

=== Semi-finals ===
Team 1	Score	Team 2
Bohemians	2–2	Cliftonville
Shelbourne	3–0	Derry Celtic

==== Replay ====
Team 1	Score	Team 2
Bohemians	2–2	Cliftonville

==== Second replay ====
Team 1	Score	Team 2
Bohemians	2–1	Cliftonville

=== Final ===
25 March 1911

Shelbourne	0–0	Bohemians
	Report

Dalymount Park, Dublin

==== Replay ====
15 April 1911

Shelbourne	2–1	Bohemians
Moran (pen.); Devlin	Report	R. Hooper

Dalymount Park, Dublin
