= 1902–03 Irish Cup =

Tournament details
- Country: Ireland
- Date: 25 October 1902 – 14 March 1903
- Teams: 12

Final positions
- Champions: Distillery (7th win)
- Runners-up: Bohemians

Tournament statistics
- Matches played: 12
- Goals scored: 54 (4.5 per match)

The 1902–03 Irish Cup was the 23rd edition of the Irish Cup, the premier knock-out cup competition in Irish football.

Distillery won the tournament for the 7th time, defeating Bohemians 3–1 in the final.

== Results ==
=== First round ===
Team 1	Score	Team 2
Cliftonville	1–1	Distillery
Derry Celtic	5–1	North End
Dublin Celtic	0–7	Bohemians
Glentoran	6–0	Ulster
Linfield	3–0	Belfast Celtic
Tritonville	1–2	Shelbourne

==== Replay ====
Team 1	Score	Team 2
Distillery	4–1	Cliftonville

=== Quarter-finals ===
Team 1	Score	Team 2
Bohemians	4–1	Shelbourne
Glentoran	1–2	Linfield
Derry Celtic	bye	
Distillery	bye	

=== Semi-finals ===
Team 1	Score	Team 2
Bohemians	6–1	Derry Celtic
Distillery	2–1	Linfield

=== Final ===
14 March 1903

Distillery	3–1	Bohemians
Kearns; Hunter; Hamilton	Report	Pratt

Dalymount Park, Dublin
Attendance: 8,000
Referee: F. Bye (Sheffield)
