= 1909–10 Irish Cup =

Tournament details
- Country: Ireland
- Date: 5 February 1910 – 26 March 1910
- Teams: 8

Final positions
- Champions: Distillery (9th win)
- Runners-up: Cliftonville

Tournament statistics
- Matches played: 10
- Goals scored: 31 (3.1 per match)

The 1909–10 Irish Cup was the 30th edition of the Irish Cup, premier knock-out cup competition in Irish football.

Distillery won the tournament for the 9th time, defeating Cliftonville 1–0 in the final.

== Results ==
=== Quarter-finals ===
Team 1	Score	Team 2
Belfast Celtic	0–2	Bohemians
Cliftonville	2–0^{1}	Shelbourne
Derry Celtic	2–2	Distillery
Linfield	2–2	Glentoran

^{1} After a protest about the state of the pitch a replay was ordered.

==== Replays ====
Team 1	Score	Team 2
Cliftonville	1–0	Shelbourne
Distillery	5–2	Derry Celtic
Glentoran	2–1	Linfield

=== Semi-finals ===
Team 1	Score	Team 2
Cliftonville	3–0	Bohemians
Distillery	4–0	Glentoran

=== Final ===
26 March 1910

Distillery	1–0	Cliftonville
Johnston	Report

The Oval, Belfast
