= 1954–55 Irish Cup =

Tournament details
- Country: Northern Ireland
- Teams: 16

Final positions
- Champions: Dundela (1st win)
- Runners-up: Glenavon

Tournament statistics
- Matches played: 18
- Goals scored: 55 (3.06 per match)

The 1954–55 Irish Cup was the 75th edition of the Irish Cup, the premier knock-out cup competition in Northern Irish football. It began on 5 February 1955, and concluded on 23 April with the final.

The trophy was won by junior side Dundela, who pulled off one of the biggest shocks in Irish Cup history by defeating Irish League side Glenavon in the final, who had already won three senior trophies that season: the City Cup, Gold Cup and Ulster Cup. The defending champions were Derry City, who were defeated 3–2 in the first round by Linfield.

== Results ==
=== First round ===
Team 1	Score	Team 2
Ballymena United	1–2	Crusaders
Bangor	1–4	Ards
Distillery	0–0	Glenavon
Glentoran	1–0	East Belfast
Larne	2–4	Cliftonville
Linfield	3–2	Derry City
Newington Rangers	1–3	Dundela
Portadown	4–2	Coleraine

==== Replay ====
Team 1	Score	Team 2
Glenavon	5–1	Distillery

=== Quarter-finals ===
Team 1	Score	Team 2
Crusaders	2–1	Linfield
Dundela	1–0	Cliftonville
Glenavon	1–0	Ards
Glentoran	1–1	Portadown

==== Replay ====
Team 1	Score	Team 2
Portadown	1–1	Glentoran

==== Second replay ====
Team 1	Score	Team 2
Glentoran	2–0	Portadown

=== Semi-finals ===
Team 1	Score	Team 2
Glenavon	2–0	Portadown
Dundela	2–1	Crusaders

=== Final ===
23 April 1955

Dundela	3 – 0	Glenavon
Ervine 21', 85'; Greenwood 88'	Report

Windsor Park, Belfast
Attendance: 10,000
