= Irish Cup =

Association football tournament

- Organiser(s): Irish Football Association
- Founded: 1881
- Region: Northern Ireland (since 1921); Ireland (1881–1921)
- Teams: 124 (2026–27)
- International cup: UEFA Europa Conference League
- Current champions: Coleraine F.C. (2025–26)
- Most championships: Linfield (44 titles)
- Broadcaster(s): BBC Sport (highlights & 3 live games including final)
- Website: irishfa.com/irish-cup
- 2026–27 season

The Irish Football Association Challenge Cup, commonly referred to as the Irish Cup (currently known as the Clearer Water Irish Cup for sponsorship purposes) is the primary football knockout cup competition in Northern Ireland. Inaugurated in 1881, it is the fourth-oldest national cup competition in the world. Prior to the break-away from the Irish Football Association by clubs from what would become the Irish Free State in 1921, the Irish Cup was the national cup competition for the whole of Ireland.

Since 3 October 2023, the cup has been sponsored by Clearer Water. It was previously sponsored by Nationwide Building Society, Bass Ireland Ltd, JJB Sports, Tennent's Lager and Sadler's Peaky Blinder and Samuel Gelston's Irish Whiskey.

Coleraine are the current holders after defeating former champions Dungannon Swifts 3-2 in the 2026 final.

== Format ==
During the cup's history, different formats and rules have been used in respect of eligibility to enter the competition, the number of teams and rounds, replays, extra time, penalties, etc. The competition is open to all IFA-affiliated clubs with intermediate or senior status. Clubs obtain such status by meeting minimum criteria laid down by the IFA in respect of facilities, etc. Each club, for example, must have its own enclosed ground. The competition usually begins in August or September with the first qualifying round, and ends with the final in May of the following year. Clubs from level 3 (the NIFL Premier Intermediate League) and all regional league entrants from level 4 and below enter in the first qualifying round. These clubs play against each other over four qualifying rounds, until 8 clubs remain. The 8 fourth qualifying round winners then join the 24 senior clubs from levels 1 and 2 of the Northern Ireland Football League in the first round of the main competition, which consists of 32 clubs and is played in January.

The competition has always been played in a randomly-drawn knockout format. Depending on the number of entrants, the draw sometimes necessitates byes in the earlier rounds. If a team receives a bye, they automatically get drawn first in the following round to avoid the possibility of a team receiving multiple byes. The team drawn first from each tie hosts the match, except in the case of an intermediate team from level 3 or below being drawn first against a senior team from levels 1 or 2. In that scenario, the tie is played at the ground of the 'senior' team. In all ties that finish level after 90 minutes, extra time is played and (if necessary) penalties are used to decide the winner. Both semi-finals and the final are usually played at Windsor Park.

The winners qualify to represent Northern Ireland in the following season's UEFA Europa Conference League, subject to the club attaining a UEFA licence. However, if they have already qualified for a UEFA competition by finishing as champions or runners-up of the NIFL Premiership, or if they do not attain a UEFA licence, the Irish Cup's Europa Conference League berth is redistributed to the third-placed Premiership club, and the 4th–7th placed clubs participate in the Premiership's Europa Conference League play-offs.

== History ==
The Irish Cup was inaugurated in the 1880–81 season, with seven clubs taking part. The draw for the first round took place on 10 January 1881, with the first ever Irish Cup matches being played on 5 February 1881. The trophy was first awarded to Moyola Park (from Castledawson in County Londonderry) when they beat Cliftonville (from Belfast) 1–0 in the final at Cliftonville Cricket Ground, Belfast on 9 April 1881. Since its inception, the Irish Cup has always been, and continues to be, considered the most important such competition in Northern Ireland (and, prior to 1921, Ireland), second only to the NIFL Premiership. The cup final is the climax of the domestic season in Northern Ireland and usually attracts the biggest attendance of any club match.

Since the inception of the Irish Football League in 1890–91 (and excluding the First and Second World War years when the League was suspended), the Cup has been won by Irish League clubs on every occasion except three famous ‘giant-killing’ occasions when "junior" clubs beat senior opponents in the final: in 1928, Willowfield beat Larne 1–0; in 1955, Dundela beat Glenavon 3–0; and in 1976, Carrick Rangers beat Linfield 2–1. In the early years, Army regiments stationed in Ireland entered teams such as King's Own Rifles (Cork), three of which reached the final: the Gordon Highlanders in 1890, the Black Watch (Limerick) in 1892 and the Sherwood Foresters (Curragh, County Kildare) in 1897. The Gordon Highlanders were the only Army team to win the Cup.

Between 1881 and 1921 when the Irish Cup was an all-Ireland competition, southern clubs (from what would become the Irish Free State and later the Republic of Ireland) only won the competition four times out of a possible 41: Shelbourne (from Dublin) won three times (in 1906, 1911 and 1920); and Bohemians (also from Dublin) won it in 1908. There were two all-southern finals: Bohemians defeating Shelbourne in 1908, and Shelbourne defeating Bohemians in 1911 (both ties required replays). Shelbourne, Bohemians and Derry City are the only clubs to win both the Irish Cup and the FAI Cup. Other Dublin clubs to compete in the Irish Cup were Dublin University, St. James's Gate, Dublin Association, Tritonville and Richmond Rovers.

In the second competition in 1881–82, Queen's Island became the first Belfast club to win the Cup and it did not leave Belfast again for another 24 years, when in 1905–06, Shelbourne became the first club from Dublin to win it. Of the 141 competitions played to date, Belfast clubs have won the cup 104 times; 73.8% of all competitions. In 2026, Coleraine defeated Dungannon Swifts 3–2 to win the cup for the seventh time, equalling Glenavon as the most successful clubs from outside Belfast, each with seven wins. (Note: Distillery, now based outside Belfast (in Ballyskeagh) and known as Lisburn Distillery, won the Cup 12 times while still based in Belfast.)

In the early years of the competition the final was played at several different venues in Belfast, including the Oval, Solitude, Grosvenor Park and Celtic Park, as well as Dalymount Park in Dublin. Since 1996, the final has been played exclusively at Windsor Park, except for the 2015 and 2021 finals. The 2015 final had to be switched to the Oval, following the discovery of damage to a stand at the usual Windsor Park venue, while the 2021 final was moved to Mourneview Park, Lurgan for the first time due to maintenance works at Windsor Park, including a new playing surface being laid. This was the first final to be played outside Belfast since 1975, when Coleraine won the Cup with a 1–0 victory over Linfield in the second replay, after 1–1 and 0–0 draws in the first two games. The first final ever played outside Belfast took place in 1903, when Distillery won their 7th Irish Cup with a 3–1 victory over Bohemians at Dalymount Park, Dublin.

All six counties in Northern Ireland have been represented in the final. Moyola Park from County Londonderry were inaugural winners in 1881. In 1921, Glenavon became the first club from County Armagh to reach the final, but no club from Armagh won the Cup until Glenavon in 1957. County Down's first Cup finalists and winners were Ards in 1927; and County Antrim's were Ballymena in 1929. In 2007, Dungannon Swifts became the first club from County Tyrone to reach the final, and in 2019, Ballinamallard United became the first team from County Fermanagh to reach the final, completing the set.

Prior to replays being abolished in the final, a replay was required to decide the winner of 21 finals, the first in 1890 after Cliftonville and the Gordon Highlanders drew 2–2. Of the 21 finals to be replayed, eight of them required a second replay to separate the two finalists. The last time this occurred, and the last final replay ever played before they were abolished was in 1993, when Bangor defeated Ards 1–0 after two 1–1 draws. It was decided after this that there should only be one replay in which penalties would be used to determine the winner if necessary, and eventually the rules were changed to remove final replays altogether, with penalties being used if necessary after extra time in the first match. The first final to be won on penalties took place in 2007, when Linfield beat Dungannon Swifts 3–2 on penalties following a 2–2 draw after extra time. In 2014, the rules were changed to abolish replays from the entire competition. All ties level after 90 minutes now use 30 minutes of extra time, and if necessary, a penalty shoot-out to determine the winner.

The final was not played on three occasions:

- In 1912, Linfield were awarded the Cup after the other three semi-finalists (Cliftonville, Glentoran and Shelbourne) resigned from the IFA in a dispute over the amount of money paid to Linfield for hosting international matches.
- In 1920, Shelbourne, who had beaten Glenavon in one semi-final, were awarded the Cup after the other semi-final was declared null and void as both of the clubs involved were ejected from the competition: Belfast Celtic after Celtic fans fired shots at Glentoran supporters during a riot, and Glentoran for fielding an unlisted player.
- In 1999, Portadown were awarded the Cup when the other finalists, Cliftonville, were ejected from the competition after it was discovered that they had fielded an ineligible player, Simon Gribben, during the earlier rounds.

A total of 24 different clubs have won the Cup, but only 13 clubs have done so more than once. 34 different clubs have reached the final, with 12 of them appearing only once. Of those 12 clubs, five of them have won the Cup in their sole final appearance. On five occasions the same two clubs have reached the final in consecutive years: in 1885 and 1886, Distillery and Alexander; in 1913 and 1914, Glentoran and Linfield; in 1930 and 1931, Ballymena United and Linfield; Coleraine and Glentoran in 2003 and 2004; and in 2011 and 2012 Linfield and Crusaders. The most common final has been between Glentoran and Linfield, which has occurred 15 times. Linfield have won eight of the meetings, with Glentoran winning seven. The last time both clubs reached the final was in 2006, when Linfield won 2–1.

In 2001, the final was broadcast live on television for the first time on BBC Northern Ireland and has been on every occasion since

Windsor Park has hosted the most finals (75, including replays), followed by The Oval with 25, and Solitude with 23.

== Records ==
Most wins: 44, Linfield

Most consecutive wins: 4, Glentoran (1985, 1986, 1987 & 1988)

Most appearances in a final: 64, Linfield (Note: Linfield have won the Cup 44 times and been runners-up 22 times. However, as the final was not played in 1911–12 they have only appeared in 65 finals.)

Most consecutive appearances in a final: 5, Linfield (1891, 1892, 1893, 1894 & 1895)

Most defeats in a final: 21, Linfield

Most consecutive defeats in a final: 3, Linfield (1975, 1976 & 1977)

Biggest win in a final: Linfield 10–1 Bohemians (1895)

Longest gap between wins in a final: 70 years, Cliftonville (1909 and 1979)

Longest gap between appearances in a final: 55 years, Bangor (1938 and 1993)

Most appearances in a final without winning: 6, Larne (1928, 1935, 1987, 1989, 2005 & 2021)

Most common pair of finalists: Glentoran v Linfield – 15 times (1899, 1913, 1914, 1916, 1919, 1923, 1932, 1942, 1945, 1966, 1973, 1983, 1985, 2001 & 2006)

== Final results ==
Key:

	Scores level after 90 minutes. A replay was required.
(a.e.t.)	Scores level after extra time. A replay was required.
(a.e.t.)	Scores level after 90 minutes. Winner was decided in extra time with no penalty shootout required.
pens.	Scores level after extra time. A penalty shootout was required to determine the winner.

#	Season	Date	Winner (number of titles)	Score	Runner-up	Venue	Attendance
1	1880–81	9 April 1881	Moyola Park (1)	1 – 0	Cliftonville	Cliftonville Cricket Ground, Belfast	1,500
2	1881–82	13 May 1882	Queen's Island (1881) (1)	1 – 0	Cliftonville	Ulster Cricket Ground, Belfast	2,000
3	1882–83	5 May 1883	Cliftonville (1)	5 – 0	Ulster	Bloomfield Ground, Knock, Belfast	2,000
4	1883–84	19 April 1884	Distillery (1)	5 – 0	Wellington Park	Ulster Cricket Ground, Belfast	2,000
5	1884–85	21 March 1885	Distillery (2)	3 – 0	Limavady	Ulster Cricket Ground, Belfast	2,000
6	1885–86	27 March 1886	Distillery (3)	1 – 0	Limavady	Ulster Cricket Ground, Belfast	1,000
7	1886–87	12 February 1887	Ulster (1)	3 – 0	Cliftonville	Broadway Ground, Belfast	4,000
8	1887–88	17 March 1888	Cliftonville (2)	2 – 1	Distillery	Ulster Cricket Ground, Belfast	3,000
9	1888–89	16 March 1889	Distillery (4)	5 – 4	YMCA	Ulster Cricket Ground, Belfast	3,500
10	1889–90	8 March 1890	Gordon Highlanders (1)	2 – 2	Cliftonville	Ulster Cricket Ground, Belfast	4,500
10	Replay	12 April 1890	Gordon Highlanders (1)	3 – 1	Cliftonville	Ulsterville, Belfast	3,500
11	1890–91	14 March 1891	Linfield (1)**	4 – 2	Ulster	Solitude, Belfast	5,000
12	1891–92	12 March 1892	Linfield (2)**	7 – 0	The Black Watch	Solitude, Belfast	5,500
13	1892–93	11 March 1893	Linfield (3)**	5 – 1	Cliftonville	Ulsterville, Belfast
14	1893–94	17 March 1894	Distillery (5)	2 – 2	Linfield	Solitude, Belfast	5,500
14	Replay	18 April 1894	Distillery (5)	3 – 2	Linfield	Solitude, Belfast
15	1894–95	23 March 1895	Linfield (4)**	10 – 1	Bohemians	Solitude, Belfast	2,000
16	1895–96	14 March 1896	Distillery (6)**	3 – 1	Glentoran	Solitude, Belfast	6,000
17	1896–97	20 March 1897	Cliftonville (3)	3 – 1	Sherwood Foresters	Grosvenor Park, Belfast	5,000
18	1897–98	19 March 1898	Linfield (5)**	2 – 0	St Columb's Hall Celtic	The Oval, Belfast	3,000
19	1898–99	18 March 1899	Linfield (6)	2 – 1	Glentoran	Solitude, Belfast	7,000
20	1899–1900	24 March 1900	Cliftonville (4)	2 – 1	Bohemians	Grosvenor Park, Belfast	5,500
21	1900–01	13 April 1901	Cliftonville (5)	1 – 0	Freebooters	Grosvenor Park, Belfast	5,500
22	1901–02	15 March 1902	Linfield (7)**	5 – 1	Distillery	Solitude, Belfast	8,000
23	1902–03	14 March 1903	Distillery (7)**	3 – 1	Bohemians	Dalymount Park, Dublin	6,000
24	1903–04	17 March 1904	Linfield (8)**	5 – 1	Derry Celtic	Grosvenor Park, Belfast	6,000
25	1904–05	11 March 1905	Distillery (8)	3 – 0	Shelbourne	Solitude, Belfast	12,000
26	1905–06	28 April 1906	Shelbourne (1)	2 – 0	Belfast Celtic	Dalymount Park, Dublin	8,000
27	1906–07	23 March 1907	Cliftonville (6)	0 – 0	Shelbourne	Celtic Park, Belfast	12,900
27	Replay	20 April 1907	Cliftonville (6)	1 – 0	Shelbourne	Dalymount Park, Dublin	10,000
28	1907–08	21 March 1908	Bohemians (1)	1 – 1	Shelbourne	Dalymount Park, Dublin	8,000
28	Replay	28 March 1908	Bohemians (1)	3 – 1	Shelbourne	Dalymount Park, Dublin	9,000
29	1908–09	3 April 1909	Cliftonville (7)	0 – 0	Bohemians	Windsor Park, Belfast	3,000
29	Replay	10 April 1909	Cliftonville (7)	2 – 1	Bohemians	Dalymount Park, Dublin	15,000
30	1909–10	26 March 1910	Distillery (9)	1 – 0	Cliftonville	The Oval, Belfast	10,000
31	1910–11	25 March 1911	Shelbourne (2)	0 – 0	Bohemians	Dalymount Park, Dublin	16,000
31	Replay	15 April 1911	Shelbourne (2)	2 – 1	Bohemians	Dalymount Park, Dublin
	1911–12		Linfield (9)	Final not played. (Note: Linfield were awarded the Cup after the other three semi-finalists (Cliftonville, Glentoran and Shelbourne) resigned from the IFA in a dispute over referee's wages.)
32	1912–13	29 March 1913	Linfield (10)	2 – 0	Glentoran	Celtic Park, Belfast	20,000
33	1913–14	28 March 1914	Glentoran (1)	3 – 1	Linfield	Grosvenor Park, Belfast	20,000
34	1914–15	27 March 1915	Linfield (11)	1 – 0	Belfast Celtic	Solitude, Belfast	20,000
35	1915–16	25 March 1916	Linfield (12)	1 – 1	Glentoran	Celtic Park, Belfast
35	Replay	1 April 1916	Linfield (12)	1 – 0	Glentoran	Grosvenor Park, Belfast
36	1916–17	31 March 1917	Glentoran (2)	2 – 0	Belfast Celtic	Windsor Park, Belfast	20,000
37	1917–18	30 March 1918	Belfast Celtic (1)	0 – 0	Linfield	The Oval, Belfast	17,500
37	Replay	13 April 1918	Belfast Celtic (1)	0 – 0	Linfield	Solitude, Belfast	14,000
37	2nd replay	24 April 1918	Belfast Celtic (1)	2 – 0	Linfield	Grosvenor Park, Belfast	11,000
38	1918–19	29 March 1919	Linfield (13)	1 – 1	Glentoran	Celtic Park, Belfast	18,000
38	Replay	5 April 1919	Linfield (13)	0 – 0	Glentoran	Grosvenor Park, Belfast
38	2nd replay	7 April 1919	Linfield (13)	2 – 1	Glentoran	Solitude, Belfast
	1919–20		Shelbourne (3)	Final not played. (Note: Shelbourne, who had beaten Glenavon in one semi-final, were awarded the Cup after the other semi-final was declared null and void as both of the teams involved were ejected from the competition: Belfast Celtic after their fans fired shots at Glentoran supporters during a riot, and Glentoran for fielding an unlisted player.)
39	1920–21	26 March 1921	Glentoran (3)**	2 – 0	Glenavon	Windsor Park, Belfast
40	1921–22	25 March 1922	Linfield (14)**	2 – 0	Glenavon	The Oval, Belfast	5,000
41	1922–23	31 March 1923	Linfield (15)**	2 – 0	Glentoran	Solitude, Belfast
42	1923–24	29 March 1924	Queen's Island (1)**	1 – 0	Willowfield	Windsor Park, Belfast	10,000
43	1924–25	21 March 1925	Distillery (10)	2 – 1	Glentoran	Solitude, Belfast	20,000
44	1925–26	27 March 1926	Belfast Celtic (2)**	3 – 2	Linfield	Solitude, Belfast	15,000
45	1926–27	26 March 1927	Ards (1)	3 – 2	Cliftonville	The Oval, Belfast
46	1927–28	31 March 1928	Willowfield (1)	1 – 1	Larne	Windsor Park, Belfast
46	Replay	25 April 1928	Willowfield (1)	1 – 0	Larne	Windsor Park, Belfast	12,000
47	1928–29	30 March 1929	Ballymena (1)	2 – 1	Belfast Celtic	Solitude, Belfast
48	1929–30	29 March 1930	Linfield (16)**	4 – 3	Ballymena	Celtic Park, Belfast
49	1930–31	28 March 1931	Linfield (17)	3 – 0	Ballymena	The Oval, Belfast	20,211
50	1931–32	26 March 1932	Glentoran (4)	2 – 1	Linfield	Celtic Park, Belfast
51	1932–33	8 April 1933	Glentoran (5)	1 – 1	Distillery	Windsor Park, Belfast	27,000
51	Replay	12 April 1933	Glentoran (5)	1 – 1	Distillery	Windsor Park, Belfast	25,000
51	2nd replay	28 April 1933	Glentoran (5)	3 – 1	Distillery	Windsor Park, Belfast	21,000
52	1933–34	14 April 1934	Linfield (18)**	5 – 0	Cliftonville	The Oval, Belfast	18,500
53	1934–35	6 April 1935	Glentoran (6)	0 – 0	Larne	Windsor Park, Belfast	15,000
53	Replay	10 April 1935	Glentoran (6)	0 – 0	Larne	Windsor Park, Belfast	8,000
53	2nd replay	30 April 1935	Glentoran (6)	1 – 0	Larne	Windsor Park, Belfast	10,545
54	1935–36	4 April 1936	Linfield (19)	0 – 0	Derry City	Celtic Park, Belfast	22,000
54	Replay	8 April 1936	Linfield (19)	2 – 1 (a.e.t.)	Derry City	Celtic Park, Belfast	14,000
55	1936–37	10 April 1937	Belfast Celtic (3)**	3 – 0	Linfield	The Oval, Belfast	15,540
56	1937–38	9 April 1938	Belfast Celtic (4)**	0 – 0	Bangor	Solitude, Belfast	12,000
56	Replay	7 May 1938	Belfast Celtic (4)**	2 – 0	Bangor	Solitude, Belfast	10,000
57	1938–39	29 April 1939	Linfield (20)	2 – 0	Ballymena United	Solitude, Belfast	17,500
58	1939–40	20 April 1940	Ballymena United (1)	2 – 0	Glenavon	Windsor Park, Belfast
59	1940–41	26 April 1941	Belfast Celtic (5)	1 – 0	Linfield	Windsor Park, Belfast	12,000
60	1941–42	18 April 1942	Linfield (21)	3 – 1	Glentoran	Celtic Park, Belfast
61	1942–43	17 April 1943	Belfast Celtic (6)	1 – 0	Glentoran	Windsor Park, Belfast
62	1943–44	17 April 1944	Belfast Celtic (7)	3 – 1	Linfield	Windsor Park, Belfast	25,240
63	1944–45	14 April 1945	Linfield (22)	4 – 2	Glentoran	Celtic Park, Belfast	20,000
64	1945–46	13 April 1946	Linfield (23)	3 – 0	Distillery	Celtic Park, Belfast	20,137
65	1946–47	26 April 1947	Belfast Celtic (8)	1 – 0	Glentoran	Windsor Park, Belfast	25,000
66	1947–48	10 April 1948	Linfield (24)	3 – 0	Coleraine	Celtic Park, Belfast	31,000
67	1948–49	16 April 1949	Derry City (1)	3 – 1	Glentoran	Windsor Park, Belfast	27,000
68	1949–50	22 April 1950	Linfield (25)**	2 – 1	Distillery	Windsor Park, Belfast	17,000
69	1950–51	28 April 1951	Glentoran (7)**	3 – 1	Ballymena United	Windsor Park, Belfast	25,000
70	1951–52	26 April 1952	Ards (2)	1 – 0	Glentoran	Windsor Park, Belfast	23,000
71	1952–53	25 April 1953	Linfield (26)	5 – 0	Coleraine	Solitude, Belfast	21,000
72	1953–54	24 April 1954	Derry City (2)	2 – 2	Glentoran	Windsor Park, Belfast	35,000
72	Replay	29 April 1954	Derry City (2)	0 – 0	Glentoran	Windsor Park, Belfast	30,827
72	2nd replay	10 May 1954	Derry City (2)	1 – 0	Glentoran	Windsor Park, Belfast	28,000
73	1954–55	23 April 1955	Dundela (1)	3 – 0	Glenavon	Windsor Park, Belfast	10,000
74	1955–56	21 April 1956	Distillery (11)	2 – 2	Glentoran	Windsor Park, Belfast	20,000
74	Replay	26 April 1956	Distillery (11)	1 – 1	Glentoran	Windsor Park, Belfast	15,000
74	2nd replay	30 April 1956	Distillery (11)	1 – 0	Glentoran	Windsor Park, Belfast	12,000
75	1956–57	13 April 1957	Glenavon (1)**	2 – 0	Derry City	Windsor Park, Belfast	25,000
76	1957–58	26 April 1958	Ballymena United (2)	2 – 0	Linfield	The Oval, Belfast	24,000
77	1958–59	18 April 1959	Glenavon (2)	1 – 1	Ballymena United	Windsor Park, Belfast	18,000
77	Replay	29 April 1959	Glenavon (2)	2 – 0	Ballymena United	Windsor Park, Belfast	15,000
78	1959–60	30 April 1960	Linfield (27)	5 – 1	Ards	The Oval, Belfast	17,000
79	1960–61	22 April 1961	Glenavon (3)	5 – 1	Linfield	Solitude, Belfast	18,000
80	1961–62	14 April 1962	Linfield (28)**	4 – 0	Portadown	The Oval, Belfast	23,000
81	1962–63	20 April 1963	Linfield (29)	2 – 1	Distillery	The Oval, Belfast	20,000
82	1963–64	25 April 1964	Derry City (3)	2 – 0	Glentoran	Windsor Park, Belfast	19,000
83	1964–65	24 April 1965	Coleraine (1)	2 – 1	Glenavon	Windsor Park, Belfast	12,000
84	1965–66	23 April 1966	Glentoran (8)	2 – 0	Linfield	The Oval, Belfast	20,000
85	1966–67	22 April 1967	Crusaders (1)	3 – 1	Glentoran	Windsor Park, Belfast	20,000
86	1967–68	27 April 1968	Crusaders (2)	2 – 0	Linfield	The Oval, Belfast	18,000
87	1968–69	19 April 1969	Ards (3)	0 – 0	Distillery	Windsor Park, Belfast	17,000
87	Replay	23 April 1969	Ards (3)	4 – 2 (a.e.t.)	Distillery	Windsor Park, Belfast	16,000
88	1969–70	4 April 1970	Linfield (30)	2 – 1	Ballymena United	Solitude, Belfast	12,000
89	1970–71	3 April 1971	Distillery (12)	3 – 0	Derry City	Windsor Park, Belfast	6,000
90	1971–72	22 April 1972	Coleraine (2)	2 – 1	Portadown	Windsor Park, Belfast	8,000
91	1972–73	28 April 1973	Glentoran (9)	3 – 2	Linfield	Windsor Park, Belfast	12,000
92	1973–74	27 April 1974	Ards (4)	2 – 1	Ballymena United	Windsor Park, Belfast	7,000
93	1974–75	19 April 1975	Coleraine (3)	1 – 1	Linfield	The Showgrounds, Ballymena	5,600
93	Replay	23 April 1975	Coleraine (3)	0 – 0	Linfield	The Showgrounds, Ballymena	5,400
93	2nd replay	29 April 1975	Coleraine (3)	1 – 0	Linfield	The Showgrounds, Ballymena	5,200
94	1975–76	10 April 1976	Carrick Rangers (1)	2 – 1	Linfield	The Oval, Belfast	9,000
95	1976–77	23 April 1977	Coleraine (4)	4 – 1	Linfield	The Oval, Belfast	10,000
96	1977–78	29 April 1978	Linfield (31)**	3 – 1	Ballymena United	The Oval, Belfast	12,000
97	1978–79	28 April 1979	Cliftonville (8)	3 – 2	Portadown	Windsor Park, Belfast	18,000
98	1979–80	26 April 1980	Linfield (32)**	2 – 0	Crusaders	The Oval, Belfast	12,000
99	1980–81	2 May 1981	Ballymena United (3)	1 – 0	Glenavon	Windsor Park, Belfast	6,000
100	1981–82	24 April 1982	Linfield (33)**	2 – 1	Coleraine	The Oval, Belfast	12,000
101	1982–83	30 April 1983	Glentoran (10)	1 – 1	Linfield	Windsor Park, Belfast	12,000
101	Replay	7 May 1983	Glentoran (10)	2 – 1	Linfield	The Oval, Belfast	8,000
102	1983–84	5 May 1984	Ballymena United (4)	4 – 1	Carrick Rangers	Windsor Park, Belfast	5,000
103	1984–85	4 May 1985	Glentoran (11)	1 – 1	Linfield	The Oval, Belfast	12,000
103	Replay	11 May 1985	Glentoran (11)	1 – 0	Linfield	Windsor Park, Belfast	12,000
104	1985–86	3 May 1986	Glentoran (12)	2 – 1	Coleraine	Windsor Park, Belfast	8,000
105	1986–87	2 May 1987	Glentoran (13)	1 – 0	Larne	Windsor Park, Belfast	8,000
106	1987–88	30 April 1988	Glentoran (14)**	1 – 0	Glenavon	Windsor Park, Belfast	10,000
107	1988–89	6 May 1989	Ballymena United (5)	1 – 0	Larne	The Oval, Belfast	5,000
108	1989–90	5 May 1990	Glentoran (15)	3 – 0	Portadown	Windsor Park, Belfast	12,000
109	1990–91	4 May 1991	Portadown (1)**	2 – 1	Glenavon	Windsor Park, Belfast	12,000
110	1991–92	2 May 1992	Glenavon (4)	2 – 1	Linfield	The Oval, Belfast	12,000
111	1992–93	1 May 1993	Bangor (1)	1 – 1 (a.e.t.)	Ards	Windsor Park, Belfast	8,500
111	Replay	8 May 1993	Bangor (1)	1 – 1 (a.e.t.)	Ards	Windsor Park, Belfast	6,000
111	2nd replay	11 May 1993	Bangor (1)	1 – 0	Ards	Windsor Park, Belfast	5,000
112	1993–94	7 May 1994	Linfield (34)**	2 – 0	Bangor	The Oval, Belfast	10,000
113	1994–95	6 May 1995	Linfield (35)	3 – 1	Carrick Rangers	The Oval, Belfast	6,800
114	1995–96	4 May 1996	Glentoran (16)	1 – 0	Glenavon	Windsor Park, Belfast	10,000
115	1996–97	3 May 1997	Glenavon (5)	1 – 0	Cliftonville	Windsor Park, Belfast	8,222
116	1997–98	2 May 1998	Glentoran (17)	1 – 0 (a.e.t.)	Glenavon	Windsor Park, Belfast	8,250
	1998–99		Portadown (2)	Final not played. (Note: Portadown were awarded the Cup when the other finalists, Cliftonville, were ejected from the competition after it was discovered that they had fielded an ineligible player during the earlier rounds.)
117	1999–2000	6 May 2000	Glentoran (18)	1 – 0	Portadown	Windsor Park, Belfast	8,355
118	2000–01	5 May 2001	Glentoran (19)	1 – 0 (a.e.t.)	Linfield	Windsor Park, Belfast	14,190
119	2001–02	11 May 2002	Linfield (36)	2 – 1	Portadown	Windsor Park, Belfast	11,129
120	2002–03	3 May 2003	Coleraine (5)	1 – 0	Glentoran	Windsor Park, Belfast	9,000
121	2003–04	1 May 2004	Glentoran (20)	1 – 0	Coleraine	Windsor Park, Belfast	8,300
122	2004–05	7 May 2005	Portadown (3)	5 – 1	Larne	Windsor Park, Belfast	5,431
123	2005–06	6 May 2006	Linfield (37)**	2 – 1	Glentoran	Windsor Park, Belfast	12,500
124	2006–07	5 May 2007	Linfield (38)**	2 – 2 (a.e.t.) (3 – 2 pens.)	Dungannon Swifts	Windsor Park, Belfast	7,600
125	2007–08	3 May 2008	Linfield (39)**	2 – 1	Coleraine	Windsor Park, Belfast	8,452
126	2008–09	9 May 2009	Crusaders (3)	1 – 0	Cliftonville	Windsor Park, Belfast	8,820
127	2009–10	8 May 2010	Linfield (40)**	2 – 1	Portadown	Windsor Park, Belfast	7,940
128	2010–11	7 May 2011	Linfield (41)**	2 – 1	Crusaders	Windsor Park, Belfast	8,200
129	2011–12	5 May 2012	Linfield (42)**	4 – 1	Crusaders	Windsor Park, Belfast	7,325
130	2012–13	4 May 2013	Glentoran (21)	3 – 1 (a.e.t.)	Cliftonville	Windsor Park, Belfast	9,825
131	2013–14	3 May 2014	Glenavon (6)	2 – 1	Ballymena United	Windsor Park, Belfast	7,282
132	2014–15	2 May 2015	Glentoran (22)	1 – 0	Portadown	The Oval, Belfast	8,072
133	2015–16	7 May 2016	Glenavon (7)	2 – 0	Linfield	Windsor Park, Belfast	11,500
134	2016–17	6 May 2017	Linfield (43)**	3 – 0	Coleraine	Windsor Park, Belfast	12,551
135	2017–18	5 May 2018	Coleraine (6)	3 – 1	Cliftonville	Windsor Park, Belfast	12,012
136	2018–19	4 May 2019	Crusaders (4)	3 – 0	Ballinamallard United	Windsor Park, Belfast	5,744
137	2019–20	31 July 2020 (Note: Final was delayed until 31 July 2020, and attendance was restricted to 500 as a result of the COVID-19 pandemic in Northern Ireland.)	Glentoran (23)	2 – 1 (a.e.t.)	Ballymena United	Windsor Park, Belfast	500
138	2020–21	21 May 2021	Linfield (44)**	2 – 1	Larne	Mourneview Park, Lurgan	1,000 (Note: Attendance was restricted to 1,000 as a result of the COVID-19 pandemic in Northern Ireland.)
139	2021–22	7 May 2022	Crusaders (5)	2 – 1 (a.e.t.)	Ballymena United	Windsor Park, Belfast	7,598
140	2022–23	7 May 2023	Crusaders (6)	4 – 0	Ballymena United	Windsor Park, Belfast	9,688
141	2023–24	4 May 2024	Cliftonville (9)	3 – 1 (a.e.t.)	Linfield	Windsor Park, Belfast	14,898
142	2024–25	3 May 2025	Dungannon Swifts (1)	1 – 1 (a.e.t.) (4 – 3 pens.)	Cliftonville	Windsor Park, Belfast	12,786
143	2025–26	2 May 2026	Coleraine (7)	3 – 2	Dungannon Swifts	Windsor Park, Belfast	11,362

Winners marked with ** denotes a league and cup double

== Statistics ==
=== Performance by club ===
Clubs in italics no longer compete for the cup. Either they no longer exist, or they now play under the jurisdiction of the League of Ireland.

Club	Winners	Runners-up	Winning years	Runners-up years	Total final appearances
Linfield	44	22	1890–91, 1891–92, 1892–93, 1894–95, 1897–98, 1898–99, 1901–02, 1903–04, 1911–12, 1912–13, 1914–15, 1915–16, 1918–19, 1921–22, 1922–23, 1929–30, 1930–31, 1933–34, 1935–36, 1938–39, 1941–42, 1944–45, 1945–46, 1947–48, 1949–50, 1952–53, 1959–60, 1961–62, 1962–63, 1969–70, 1977–78, 1979–80, 1981–82, 1993–94, 1994–95, 2001–02, 2005–06, 2006–07, 2007–08, 2009–10, 2010–11, 2011–12, 2016–17, 2020–21	1893–94, 1913–14, 1917–18, 1925–26, 1931–32, 1936–37, 1940–41, 1943–44, 1957–58, 1960–61, 1965–66, 1967–68, 1972–73, 1974–75, 1975–76, 1976–77, 1982–83, 1984–85, 1991–92, 2000–01, 2015–16, 2023–24	66
Glentoran	23	19	1913–14, 1916–17, 1920–21, 1931–32, 1932–33, 1934–35, 1950–51, 1965–66, 1972–73, 1982–83, 1984–85, 1985–86, 1986–87, 1987–88, 1989–90, 1995–96, 1997–98, 1999–2000, 2000–01, 2003–04, 2012–13, 2014–15, 2019–20	1895–96, 1898–99, 1912–13, 1915–16, 1918–19, 1922–23, 1924–25, 1941–42, 1942–43, 1944–45, 1946–47, 1948–49, 1951–52, 1953–54, 1955–56, 1963–64, 1966–67, 2002–03, 2005–06	42
Distillery	12	7	1883–84, 1884–85, 1885–86, 1888–89, 1893–94, 1895–96, 1902–03, 1904–05, 1909–10, 1924–25, 1955–56, 1970–71	1887–88, 1901–02, 1932–33, 1945–46, 1949–50, 1962–63, 1968–69	19
Cliftonville	9	13	1882–83, 1887–88, 1896–97, 1899–1900, 1900–01, 1906–07, 1908–09, 1978–79, 2023–24	1880–81, 1881–82, 1886–87, 1889–90, 1892–93, 1909–10, 1926–27, 1933–34, 1996–97, 2008–09, 2012–13, 2017–18, 2024–25	22
Belfast Celtic	8	4	1917–18, 1925–26, 1936–37, 1937–38, 1940–41, 1942–43, 1943–44, 1946–47	1905–06, 1914–15, 1916–17, 1928–29	12
Glenavon	7	10	1956–57, 1958–59, 1960–61, 1991–92, 1996–97, 2013–14, 2015–16	1920–21, 1921–22, 1939–40, 1954–55, 1964–65, 1980–81, 1987–88, 1990–91, 1995–96, 1997–98	17
Coleraine	7	7	1964–65, 1971–72, 1974–75, 1976–77, 2002–03, 2017–18, 2025–26	1947–48, 1952–53, 1981–82, 1985–86, 2003–04, 2007–08, 2016–17	14
Crusaders	6	3	1966–67, 1967–68, 2008–09, 2018–19, 2021–22, 2022–23	1979–80, 2010–11, 2011–12	9
Ballymena United (Note: Ballymena United F.C. were formed immediately after Ballymena F.C. dissolved in 1934, following expulsion from the league. Generally, Ballymena United assume the history of the previous club, however technically they were two different entities.)	5	10	1939–40, 1957–58, 1980–81, 1983–84, 1988–89	1938–39, 1950–51, 1958–59, 1969–70, 1973–74, 1977–78, 2013–14, 2019–20, 2021–22, 2022–23	15
Ards	4	2	1926–27, 1951–52, 1968–69, 1973–74	1959–60, 1992–93	6
Portadown	3	8	1990–91, 1998–99, 2004–05	1961–62, 1971–72, 1978–79, 1989–90, 1999–2000, 2001–02, 2009–10, 2014–15	10 (Note: Portadown have won the Cup 3 times and been runners-up 8 times. However, as the final was not played in 1998–99 they have only appeared in 10 finals.)
Shelbourne	3	3	1905–06, 1910–11, 1919–20	1904–05, 1906–07, 1907–08	5 (Note: Shelbourne have won the Cup 3 times and been runners-up 3 times. However, as the final was not played in 1919–20 they have only appeared in 5 finals.)
Derry City	3	3	1948–49, 1953–54, 1963–64	1935–36, 1956–57, 1970–71	6
Bohemians	1	5	1907–08	1894–95, 1899–1900, 1902–03, 1908–09, 1910–11	6
Ulster	1	2	1886–87	1882–83, 1890–91	3
Ballymena	1	2	1928–29	1929–30, 1930–31	3
Carrick Rangers	1	2	1975–76	1983–84, 1994–95	3
Bangor	1	2	1992–93	1937–38, 1993–94	3
Dungannon Swifts	1	2	2024–25	2006–07, 2025–26	3
Willowfield	1	1	1927–28	1923–24	2
Moyola Park	1	0	1880–81	–	1
Queen's Island (1881)	1	0	1881–82	–	1
Gordon Highlanders	1	0	1889–90	–	1
Queen's Island (1920)	1	0	1923–24	–	1
Dundela	1	0	1954–55	–	1
Larne	0	6	–	1927–28, 1934–35, 1986–87, 1988–89, 2004–05, 2020–21	6
Limavady	0	2	–	1884–85, 1885–86	2
Derry Celtic (Note: Including one final as St Columb's Hall Celtic.)	0	2	–	1897–98, 1903–04	2
Wellington Park	0	1	–	1883–84	1
YMCA	0	1	–	1888–89	1
The Black Watch	0	1	–	1891–92	1
Sherwood Foresters	0	1	–	1896–97	1
Freebooters	0	1	–	1900–01	1
Ballinamallard United	0	1	–	2018–19	1

=== Total cups won by town or city ===
25 different clubs have won the cup, with the overwhelming majority of winners being clubs from Belfast.

Town or city	Number of cups won	Clubs
Belfast	107	Linfield (44), Glentoran (23), Distillery(12), Cliftonville (9), Belfast Celtic (8), Crusaders (6), Ulster (1), Willowfield (1), Dundela (1), Queen's Island (1881) (1), Queen's Island (1920) (1)
Lurgan	7	Glenavon (7)
Coleraine	7	Coleraine (7)
Ballymena	6	Ballymena United (5), Ballymena (1)
Dublin	4	Shelbourne (3), Bohemians (1)
Newtownards	4	Ards (4)
Derry	3	Derry City (3)
Portadown	3	Portadown (3)
Bangor	1	Bangor (1)
Carrickfergus	1	Carrick Rangers (1)
Castledawson	1	Moyola Park (1)
Dungannon	1	Dungannon Swifts (1)
British Army	1	Gordon Highlanders (1)

=== Final venues ===
There have been 143 Irish Cup finals contested during the 146 competitions completed thus far, as the final was not played on three occasions. In addition, 29 final replays have been contested, for a total of 172 matches played at thirteen different grounds. Windsor Park has been the most common venue, having hosted 80 finals including replays.

Venue	Number of finals (including replays)	First final	Last final
Windsor Park	80	1908–09	2025–26
The Oval	26	1897–98	2014–15
Solitude	22	1890–91	1969–70
Celtic Park	12	1906–07	1947–48
Dalymount Park	8	1902–03	1910–11 (replay)
Grosvenor Park	8	1896–97	1918–19 (replay)
Ulster Cricket Ground	7	1881–82	1889–90
Ballymena Showgrounds	3	1974–75	1974–75 (second replay)
Ulsterville	2	1889–90 (replay)	1892–93
Cliftonville Cricket Ground	1	1880–81	1880–81
Bloomfield	1	1882–83	1882–83
Broadway Ground	1	1886–87	1886–87
Mourneview Park	1	2020–21	2020–21
