= 1905–06 Irish Cup =

Tournament details
- Country: Ireland
- Date: 4 November 1905 – 28 April 1906
- Teams: 12

Final positions
- Champions: Shelbourne (1st win)
- Runners-up: Belfast Celtic

Tournament statistics
- Matches played: 12
- Goals scored: 33 (2.75 per match)

The 1905–06 Irish Cup was the 26th edition of the Irish Cup, the premier knock-out cup competition in Irish football.

Shelbourne won the tournament for the 1st time, defeating Belfast Celtic 2–0 in the final.

== Results ==
=== First round ===
Team 1	Score	Team 2
Belfast Celtic	2–0	Linfield
Bohemians	1–1	Royal Irish Regiment
Cork Celtic	1–3	Shelbourne
Freebooters	2–4	Cameron Highlanders
Glentoran	2–0	Distillery
Cliftonville	bye	
Derry Celtic	bye	

==== Replay ====
Team 1	Score	Team 2
Royal Irish Regiment	2–1	Bohemians

=== Quarter-finals ===
Team 1	Score	Team 2
Belfast Celtic	3–1	Cameron Highlanders
Cliftonville	0–1	Derry Celtic
Glentoran	0–2	Shelbourne
Bohemians	bye	

=== Semi-finals ===
Team 1	Score	Team 2
Belfast Celtic	2–0	Bohemians
Shelbourne	3–0	Derry Celtic

=== Final ===
28 April 1906

Shelbourne	2–0	Belfast Celtic
James Owens (pen.)	Report

Dalymount Park, Dublin
