= 1957–58 Irish Cup =

Tournament details
- Country: Northern Ireland
- Teams: 16

Final positions
- Champions: Ballymena United (2nd win)
- Runners-up: Linfield

Tournament statistics
- Matches played: 18
- Goals scored: 78 (4.33 per match)

The 1957–58 Irish Cup was the 78th edition of the Irish Cup, the premier knock-out cup competition in Northern Irish football.

Ballymena United won the cup for the 2nd time, defeating Linfield 2–0 in the final at The Oval.

Glenavon were the holders but they were defeated 4–2 by Linfield in the semi-finals.

== Results ==
=== First round ===
Team 1	Score	Team 2
Ards	4–2	Glentoran II
Ballymena United	5–0	Dundela
Cliftonville	1–3	Linfield
Crusaders	1–2	Derry City
Glenavon	3–0	Distillery
Glentoran	1–1	Bangor
Newry Town	3–3	Linfield Swifts
Portadown	2–0	Coleraine

==== Replay ====
Team 1	Score	Team 2
Bangor	2–1	Glentoran
Linfield Swifts	4–2	Newry Town

=== Quarter-finals ===
Team 1	Score	Team 2
Ballymena United	3–1	Ards
Bangor	2–3	Derry City
Glenavon	3–1	Linfield Swifts
Portadown	2–2	Linfield

==== Replay ====
Team 1	Score	Team 2
Linfield	6–4	Portadown

=== Semi-finals ===
Team 1	Score	Team 2
Ballymena United	3–0	Derry City
Linfield	4–2	Glenavon

=== Final ===
26 April 1958

Ballymena United	2–0	Linfield
McGhee 3'; Russell 25'	Report

The Oval, Belfast
Attendance: 24,000
