= 1933–34 Irish Cup =

Tournament details
- Country: Northern Ireland
- Teams: 16

Final positions
- Champions: Linfield (18th win)
- Runners-up: Cliftonville

Tournament statistics
- Matches played: 16
- Goals scored: 72 (4.5 per match)

The 1933–34 Irish Cup was the 54th edition of the Irish Cup, the premier knock-out cup competition in Northern Irish football.

Linfield won the tournament for the 18th time, defeating Cliftonville 5–0 in the final at The Oval.

== Results ==
=== First round ===
Team 1	Score	Team 2
Ards	1–2	Cliftonville
Bangor	5–3	Sunnyside
Cliftonville	3–1	Coleraine
Crusaders	1–5	Linfield
Derry City	6–0	Newry Town
Distillery	2–2	Glentoran
Glenavon	1–3	Ballymena
Larne	1–4	Belfast Celtic

==== Replay ====
Team 1	Score	Team 2
Glentoran	1–0	Distillery

=== Quarter-finals ===
Team 1	Score	Team 2
Ballymena	1–4	Belfast Celtic
Bangor	0–2	Glentoran
Cliftonville	4–0	Derry City
Linfield	2–0	Portadown

=== Semi-finals ===
Team 1	Score	Team 2
Cliftonville	4–2	Glentoran
Linfield	7–0	Belfast Celtic

=== Final ===
14 April 1934

Linfield	5–0	Cliftonville
Bambrick 20'; Caiels 28'; Mackay 72'; Donnelly 77'; McCracken 89'	Report

The Oval, Belfast
Attendance: 18,500
Referee: Peter Craigmyle (Aberdeen)
