= 1974–75 Irish Cup =

Tournament details
- Country: Northern Ireland
- Teams: 16

Final positions
- Champions: Coleraine (3rd win)
- Runners-up: Linfield

Tournament statistics
- Matches played: 22
- Goals scored: 64 (2.91 per match)

The 1974–75 Irish Cup was the 95th edition of the Irish Cup, the premier knock-out cup competition in Northern Irish football.

Coleraine won the cup for the 3rd time, defeating Linfield 1–0 in the second final replay at the Ballymena Showgrounds after the previous two matches ended in draws.

The holders Ards were eliminated in the first round by Cliftonville.

== Results ==
=== First round ===
Team 1	Score	Team 2
Ards	0–0	Cliftonville
Bangor	0–0	Linfield
Brantwood	2–0	Glenavon
Carrick Rangers	2–1	Portadown
Chimney Corner	1–2	Larne
Crusaders	1–1	Coleraine
Distillery	1–1	Dundela
Glentoran	6–3	Ballymena United

==== Replay ====
Team 1	Score	Team 2
Cliftonville	3–2	Ards
Coleraine	3–1	Crusaders
Dundela	0–1	Distillery
Linfield	2–0	Bangor

=== Quarter-finals ===
Team 1	Score	Team 2
Brantwood	2–1	Glentoran
Carrick Rangers	2–1	Distillery
Cliftonville	1–1	Coleraine
Linfield	3–0	Larne

=== Semi-finals ===
Team 1	Score	Team 2
Coleraine	6–0	Brantwood
Linfield	6–0	Carrick Rangers

=== Final ===
19 April 1975

Coleraine	1–1	Linfield
Smith 31'	Report	Graham 65'

The Showgrounds, Ballymena
Attendance: 5,600

==== Replay ====
23 April 1975

Coleraine	0–0	Linfield
	Report

The Showgrounds, Ballymena
Attendance: 5,400

==== Second replay ====
29 April 1975

Coleraine	1–0	Linfield
Smith 17'; Gordon (red card)	Report	Fraser (red card); Magee (red card)

The Showgrounds, Ballymena
Attendance: 5,200
