= 1919–20 Irish Cup =

Tournament details
- Country: Ireland
- Date: 28 January 1920 – 27 March 1920
- Teams: 11

Final positions
- Champions: Shelbourne (3rd win)

Tournament statistics
- Matches played: 10
- Goals scored: 15 (1.5 per match)

The 1919–20 Irish Cup was the 40th edition of the Irish Cup, the premier knock-out cup competition in Irish football.

Shelbourne won the tournament for the 3rd time. They had defeated Glenavon in the semi-final, but crowd trouble marred the replay of the second semi-final between Belfast Celtic and Glentoran, and both clubs were subsequently expelled from the competition. Shelbourne were subsequently declared winners of the cup.

== Results ==
=== First round ===
Team 1	Score	Team 2
Belfast United	0–1	Glenavon
Cliftonville	1–0	Dunmurry Recreation
Distillery	0–2	Glentoran
Linfield	0–1	Belfast Celtic
Shelbourne	1–0	St James's Gate
Bohemians	bye	

=== Quarter-finals ===
Team 1	Score	Team 2
Bohemians	0–2	Belfast Celtic
Glentoran	0–0	Cliftonville
Glenavon	bye	
Shelbourne	bye	

==== Replay ====
Team 1	Score	Team 2
Cliftonville	0–2	Glentoran

=== Semi-finals ===
Team 1	Score	Team 2
Belfast Celtic	1–1	Glentoran
Shelbourne	3–0	Glenavon

==== Replay ====
Team 1	Score	Team 2
Belfast Celtic	0–0^{1}	Glentoran

^{1}Following crowd trouble at the semi-final replay at Solitude, both Belfast Celtic and Glentoran were expelled from the competition and Shelbourne were declared winners of the cup.
