= 1928–29 Irish Cup =

Tournament details
- Country: Northern Ireland
- Teams: 16

Final positions
- Champions: Ballymena (1st win)
- Runners-up: Belfast Celtic

Tournament statistics
- Matches played: 18
- Goals scored: 83 (4.61 per match)

The 1928–29 Irish Cup was the 49th edition of the Irish Cup, the premier knock-out cup competition in Northern Irish football.

Ballymena (who were only competing in their first season) won the tournament for the 1st and only time in their history, defeating Belfast Celtic 2–1 in the final at Solitude.

== Results ==
=== First round ===
| Team 1 | Score | Team 2 |
|---|---|---|
| Bangor | 2–3 | Cliftonville |
| Belfast Celtic | 5–2 | Linfield Swifts |
| Broadway United | 2–0 | Ards |
| Coleraine | 2–0 | Distillery |
| Glentoran | 3–3 | Ballymena |
| Linfield | 3–2 | Larne |
| Newry Town | 0–5 | Glenavon |
| Portadown | 1–1 | Queen's Island |

==== Replay ====
| Team 1 | Score | Team 2 |
|---|---|---|
| Ballymena | 2–1 | Glentoran |
| Queen's Island | 1–6 | Portadown |

=== Quarter-finals ===
| Team 1 | Score | Team 2 |
|---|---|---|
| Ballymena | 4–1 | Broadway United |
| Coleraine | 3–0 | Portadown |
| Glenavon | 3–3 | Belfast Celtic |
| Linfield | 6–2 | Cliftonville |

==== Replay ====
| Team 1 | Score | Team 2 |
|---|---|---|
| Belfast Celtic | 7–1 | Glenavon |

=== Semi-finals ===
| Team 1 | Score | Team 2 |
|---|---|---|
| Ballymena | 3–0 | Coleraine |
| Belfast Celtic | 3–0 | Linfield |

=== Final ===
30 March 1929

| Ballymena | 2–1 | Belfast Celtic |
|---|---|---|
| Shiels 40'; McCambridge 47' | Report | Mahood 70' |

Solitude, Belfast
Referee: W. McLean
