= 1932–33 Irish Cup =

Tournament details
- Country: Northern Ireland
- Teams: 16

Final positions
- Champions: Glentoran (5th win)
- Runners-up: Distillery

Tournament statistics
- Matches played: 21
- Goals scored: 75 (3.57 per match)

The 1932–33 Irish Cup was the 53rd edition of the Irish Cup, the premier knock-out cup competition in Northern Irish football.

Glentoran won the tournament for the 5th time, defeating Distillery 3–1 in the second final replay at Windsor Park, after the previous two matches ended in draws.

== Results ==
=== First round ===
Team 1	Score	Team 2
Ballymena	2–4	Cliftonville
Bangor	0–1	Belfast Celtic
Distillery	6–0	Ards
Dunmurry Recreation	1–2	Portadown
Dunville	4–4	Glentoran
Larne	1–1	Derry City
Linfield	3–0	Glenavon
Newry Town	2–2	Coleraine

==== Replay ====
Team 1	Score	Team 2
Coleraine	2–1	Newry Town
Derry City	4–0	Larne
Glentoran	6–1	Dunville

=== Quarter-finals ===
Team 1	Score	Team 2
Cliftonville	1–0	Belfast Celtic
Coleraine	1–1	Linfield
Derry City	1–2	Distillery
Glentoran	4–1	Portadown

==== Replay ====
Team 1	Score	Team 2
Linfield	1–3	Coleraine

=== Semi-finals ===
Team 1	Score	Team 2
Distillery	2–0	Cliftonville
Glentoran	2–1	Coleraine

=== Final ===
8 April 1933

Glentoran	1–1	Distillery
Roberts 87'	Report	Storer 27'

Windsor Park, Belfast
Attendance: 33,000
Referee: W. McLean

==== Replay ====
12 April 1933

Glentoran	1–1	Distillery
McNeill 7'	Report	Kirby 10'

Windsor Park, Belfast
Attendance: 25,000
Referee: W. McLean

==== Second replay ====
28 April 1933

Glentoran	3–1	Distillery
Roberts 43'; Doherty 48'; Crooks 75'	Report	McLarnon 20'

Windsor Park, Belfast
Attendance: 21,000
Referee: W. McLean
