= 1938–39 Irish Cup =

Tournament details
- Country: Northern Ireland
- Teams: 16

Final positions
- Champions: Linfield (20th win)
- Runners-up: Ballymena United

Tournament statistics
- Matches played: 17
- Goals scored: 65 (3.82 per match)

The 1938–39 Irish Cup was the 59th edition of the Irish Cup, the premier knock-out cup competition in Northern Irish football.

Linfield won the tournament for the 20th time, defeating Ballymena United 2–0 in the final at Solitude.

== Results ==
=== First round ===
Team 1	Score	Team 2
Ards	2–2	Glenavon
Ballymena United	1–0	Glentoran
Bangor	2–0	Crusaders
Cliftonville	4–2	Coleraine
Derry City	1–2	Portadown
Distillery	1–4	Belfast Celtic
Larne	0–4	Linfield
Newry Town	2–2	Sirocco Works

==== Replay ====
Team 1	Score	Team 2
Glenavon	3–2	Ards
Sirocco Works	1–2	Newry Town

=== Quarter-finals ===
Team 1	Score	Team 2
Ballymena United	3–1	Belfast Celtic
Bangor	2–4	Portadown
Cliftonville	3–0	Glenavon
Linfield	3–1	Newry Town

=== Semi-finals ===
Team 1	Score	Team 2
Ballymena United	3–2	Portadown
Linfield	4–0	Cliftonville

=== Final ===
29 April 1939

Linfield	2–0	Ballymena United
Finlay 12'; Marshall 54'	Report

Solitude, Belfast
Attendance: 17,500
Referee: H. A. Mortimer (Huddersfield)
