= 1946–47 Irish Cup =

Tournament details
- Country: Northern Ireland
- Teams: 12

Final positions
- Champions: Belfast Celtic (8th win)
- Runners-up: Glentoran

Tournament statistics
- Matches played: 23
- Goals scored: 82 (3.57 per match)

The 1946–47 Irish Cup was the 67th edition of the Irish Cup, the premier knock-out cup competition in Northern Irish football.

Belfast Celtic won the tournament for the 8th and final time before their withdrawal from football in 1949, defeating Glentoran 1–0 in the final at Windsor Park.

== Results ==
=== First round ===
| Team 1 | Agg. | Team 2 | 1st leg | 2nd leg |
|---|---|---|---|---|
| Ballymoney United | 3–11 | Glentoran | 2–5 | 1–6 |
| Belfast Celtic | 12–3 | Queen's Island Woodworkers | 5–1 | 7–2 |
| Derry City | 2–1 | Bangor Reserves | 2–1 | 0–0 |
| Linfield | 9–1 | Dundela | 6–1 | 3–0 |
| Ballymena United | bye | | | |
| Cliftonville | bye | | | |
| Coleraine | bye | | | |
| Distillery | bye | | | |

=== Quarter-finals ===
| Team 1 | Agg. | Team 2 | 1st leg | 2nd leg |
|---|---|---|---|---|
| Cliftonville | 0–5 | Ballymena United | 0–2 | 0–3 |
| Coleraine | 4–4 | Linfield | 4–1 | 0–3 |
| Derry City | 2–6 | Belfast Celtic | 0–1 | 2–5 |
| Distillery | 2–2 | Glentoran | 1–0 | 1–2 |

==== Replay ====
| Team 1 | Score | Team 2 |
|---|---|---|
| Glentoran | 2–1 | Distillery |
| Linfield | 3–0 | Coleraine |

=== Semi-finals ===
| Team 1 | Score | Team 2 |
|---|---|---|
| Belfast Celtic | 1–0 | Linfield |
| Glentoran | 1–1 | Ballymena United |

==== Replay ====
| Team 1 | Score | Team 2 |
|---|---|---|
| Glentoran | 1–1 | Ballymena United |

==== Second replay ====
| Team 1 | Score | Team 2 |
|---|---|---|
| Glentoran | 2–1 | Ballymena United |

=== Final ===
26 April 1947

| Belfast Celtic | 1–0 | Glentoran |
|---|---|---|
| Tully 52' | Report |

Windsor Park, Belfast
Attendance: 25,000
