= 1925–26 Irish Cup =

Tournament details
- Country: Northern Ireland
- Teams: 14

Final positions
- Champions: Belfast Celtic (2nd win)
- Runners-up: Linfield

Tournament statistics
- Matches played: 19
- Goals scored: 64 (3.37 per match)

The 1925–26 Irish Cup was the 46th edition of the Irish Cup, the premier knock-out cup competition in Northern Irish football.

Belfast Celtic won the tournament for the 2nd time, defeating Linfield 3–2 in the final at Solitude.

== Results ==
=== First round ===
Team 1	Score	Team 2
Belfast Celtic	3–0	Queen's Island
Cliftonville	1–1	Belfast United
Glenavon	1–1	Barn
Glentoran	3–0	Distillery
Larne	1–3	Newry Town
Linfield	3–0	Ballyclare Comrades
Portadown	3–0	Ards

==== Replay ====
Team 1	Score	Team 2
Barn	2–2	Glenavon
Belfast United	2–1	Cliftonville

==== Second replay ====
Team 1	Score	Team 2
Glenavon	4–1	Barn

=== Quarter-finals ===
Team 1	Score	Team 2
Belfast Celtic	2–1	Glenavon
Glentoran	2–1	Belfast United
Newry Town	1–1	Portadown
Linfield	bye	

==== Replay ====
Team 1	Score	Team 2
Portadown	1–2	Newry Town

=== Semi-finals ===
Team 1	Score	Team 2
Belfast Celtic	3–0	Newry Town
Linfield	2–2	Glentoran

==== Replay ====
Team 1	Score	Team 2
Glentoran	2–2	Linfield

==== Second replay ====
Team 1	Score	Team 2
Linfield	3–2	Glentoran

=== Final ===
27 March 1926

Belfast Celtic	3–2	Linfield
Curran	Report	Andrews; Cooke

Solitude, Belfast
Attendance: 15,000
Referee: W. Cowan
