= 1914–15 Irish Cup =

Tournament details
- Country: Ireland
- Date: 30 January 1915 – 27 March 1915
- Teams: 8

Final positions
- Champions: Linfield (11th win)
- Runners-up: Belfast Celtic

Tournament statistics
- Matches played: 8
- Goals scored: 21 (2.63 per match)

The 1914–15 Irish Cup was the 35th edition of the Irish Cup, the premier knock-out cup competition in Irish football.

Linfield won the tournament for the 11th time, defeating Belfast Celtic 1–0 in the final.

== Results ==
=== Quarter-finals ===
| Team 1 | Score | Team 2 |
|---|---|---|
| Bohemians | 0–4 | Belfast Celtic |
| Distillery | 4–1 | Glenavon |
| Glentoran | 1–2 | Shelbourne |
| Linfield | 3–2 | Cliftonville |

=== Semi-finals ===
| Team 1 | Score | Team 2 |
|---|---|---|
| Belfast Celtic | 0–0 | Shelbourne |
| Linfield | 2–0 | Distillery |

==== Replay ====
| Team 1 | Score | Team 2 |
|---|---|---|
| Belfast Celtic | 1–0 | Shelbourne |

=== Final ===
27 March 1915

| Linfield | 1–0 | Belfast Celtic |
|---|---|---|
| Bovill | Report |

Solitude, Belfast
Attendance: 20,000
