= 1947–48 Irish Cup =

Tournament details
- Country: Northern Ireland
- Teams: 16

Final positions
- Champions: Linfield (24th win)
- Runners-up: Coleraine

Tournament statistics
- Matches played: 16
- Goals scored: 63 (3.94 per match)

The 1947–48 Irish Cup was the 68th edition of the Irish Cup, the premier knock-out cup competition in Northern Irish football.

Linfield won the tournament for the 24th time, defeating Coleraine 3–0 in the final at Celtic Park after the first match ended in a draw.

== Results ==
=== First round ===
Team 1	Score	Team 2
Ballymena United	3–4	Linfield
Bangor	3–1	Distillery II
Belfast Celtic	2–0	Cliftonville
Derry City	2–1	Ards
Distillery	4–1	Portadown
East Belfast	0–3	Coleraine
Glenavon	2–0	Linfield Swifts
Glentoran	1–2	Brantwood

=== Quarter-finals ===
Team 1	Score	Team 2
Belfast Celtic	4–1	Brantwood
Coleraine	1–0	Derry City
Glenavon	3–0	Distillery
Linfield	3–2	Bangor

=== Semi-finals ===
Team 1	Score	Team 2
Coleraine	3–3	Belfast Celtic
Linfield	5–1	Glenavon

==== Replay ====
Team 1	Score	Team 2
Coleraine	3–2	Belfast Celtic

=== Final ===
10 April 1948

Linfield	3–0	Coleraine
Thompson 60'; O'Connor 71' (o.g.); Simpson 85'	Report

Celtic Park, Belfast
Attendance: 31,000
Referee: S. McKittrick
