= 1922–23 Irish Cup =

Tournament details
- Country: Northern Ireland
- Date: 27 January 1923 – 31 March 1923
- Teams: 8

Final positions
- Champions: Linfield (15th win)
- Runners-up: Glentoran

Tournament statistics
- Matches played: 11
- Goals scored: 33 (3 per match)

The 1922–23 Irish Cup was the 43rd edition of the Irish Cup, the premier knock-out cup competition in Northern Irish football.

Linfield won the tournament for the 15th time, defeating Glentoran 2–0 in the final at Solitude.

== Results ==
=== Quarter-finals ===
Team 1	Score	Team 2
Brantwood	0–0	Glentoran
Dunmurry	3–2^{1}	Distillery
Glenavon	1–1	Queen's Island
Linfield	2–0	Cliftonville

^{1} After a protest, Distillery were awarded victory.

==== Replay ====
Team 1	Score	Team 2
Glentoran	2–2	Brantwood
Queen's Island	2–3	Glenavon

==== Second replay ====
Team 1	Score	Team 2
Brantwood	2–2	Glentoran

==== Third replay ====
Team 1	Score	Team 2
Glentoran	4–1	Brantwood

=== Semi-finals ===
Team 1	Score	Team 2
Glentoran	2–1	Glenavon
Linfield	1–0	Distillery

=== Final ===
31 March 1923

Linfield	2–0	Glentoran
McCracken; Savage	Report

Solitude, Belfast
