= 1956–57 Irish Cup =

Tournament details
- Country: Northern Ireland
- Teams: 16

Final positions
- Champions: Glenavon (1st win)
- Runners-up: Derry City

Tournament statistics
- Matches played: 20
- Goals scored: 69 (3.45 per match)

The 1956–57 Irish Cup was the 77th edition of the Irish Cup, the premier knock-out cup competition in Northern Irish football.

Glenavon won the cup for the 1st time, defeating Derry City 2–0 in the final at Windsor Park.

Distillery were the holders but they were defeated 1-0 by Glenavon in the semi-finals.

== Results ==
=== First round ===
Team 1	Score	Team 2
Ards	4–1	Crusaders
Derry City	2–1	Bangor
Distillery	2–1	Cliftonville
Glentoran	3–2	Linfield Swifts
Larne	1–1	Glenavon
Linfield	2–1	Coleraine
Newry Town	4–2	Brantwood Seconds
Portadown	1–1	Ballymena United

==== Replay ====
Team 1	Score	Team 2
Ballymena United	2–3	Portadown
Glenavon	6–2	Larne

=== Quarter-finals ===
Team 1	Score	Team 2
Derry City	3–0	Ards
Distillery	1–1	Portadown
Glentoran	2–2	Linfield
Newry Town	1–4	Glenavon

==== Replay ====
Team 1	Score	Team 2
Linfield	2–1	Glentoran
Portadown	2–4	Distillery

=== Semi-finals ===
Team 1	Score	Team 2
Derry City	0–0	Linfield
Glenavon	1–0	Distillery

==== Replay ====
Team 1	Score	Team 2
Derry City	1–0	Linfield

=== Final ===
13 April 1957

Glenavon	2–0	Derry City
Houston 87' (o.g.); Jones 89'	Report

Windsor Park, Belfast
Attendance: 25,000
Referee: A. E. Ellis (Halifax)
