= 1940–41 Irish Cup =

Tournament details
- Country: Northern Ireland
- Teams: 16

Final positions
- Champions: Belfast Celtic (5th win)
- Runners-up: Linfield

Tournament statistics
- Matches played: 17
- Goals scored: 96 (5.65 per match)

The 1940–41 Irish Cup was the 61st edition of the Irish Cup, the premier knock-out cup competition in Northern Irish football.

Belfast Celtic won the tournament for the 5th time, defeating Linfield 1–0 in the final at Windsor Park.

== Results ==
=== First round ===
Team 1	Score	Team 2
Belfast Celtic	11–0	Coleraine
Cliftonville	w/o	Newry Town
Crusaders	1–7	Portadown
Distillery	3–0	Glentoran
Glenavon	5–0	Glentoran II
Larne	3–4	Bangor
Linfield	4–1	Ards
Royal Ulster Rifles	5–5	Derry City

==== Replay ====
Team 1	Score	Team 2
Derry City	3–2	Royal Ulster Rifles

=== Quarter-finals ===
Team 1	Score	Team 2
Belfast Celtic	3–2	Bangor
Cliftonville	3–3	Glenavon
Derry City	0–1	Distillery
Portadown	0–3	Linfield

==== Replay ====
Team 1	Score	Team 2
Glenavon	5–0	Cliftonville

=== Semi-finals ===
Team 1	Score	Team 2
Belfast Celtic	5–2	Glenavon
Linfield	3–3	Distillery

==== Replay ====
Team 1	Score	Team 2
Linfield	5–2	Distillery

=== Final ===
26 April 1941

Belfast Celtic	1–0	Linfield
O'Connor	Report

Windsor Park, Belfast
Referee: S. Thompson
