= 1917–18 Irish Cup =

Tournament details
- Country: Ireland
- Date: 2 February 1918 – 24 April 1918
- Teams: 11

Final positions
- Champions: Belfast Celtic (1st win)
- Runners-up: Linfield

Tournament statistics
- Matches played: 14
- Goals scored: 36 (2.57 per match)

The 1917–18 Irish Cup was the 38th edition of the Irish Cup, the premier knock-out cup competition in Irish football.

Belfast Celtic won the tournament for the 1st time, defeating Linfield 2–0 in the second final replay after the previous two matches had ended in draws.

== Results ==
=== First round ===
Team 1	Score	Team 2
Belfast Celtic	0–0	Glentoran
Belfast United	2–0	Cliftonville
Distillery	3–0	Linfield Swifts
Linfield	8–3	Glenavon
Shelbourne	3–1	Bohemians
Glentoran II	bye	

==== Replay ====
Team 1	Score	Team 2
Glentoran	0–1	Belfast Celtic

=== Quarter-finals ===
Team 1	Score	Team 2
Belfast Celtic	0–0	Glentoran II
Belfast United	3–0	Shelbourne
Distillery	bye	
Linfield	bye	

==== Replay ====
Team 1	Score	Team 2
Belfast Celtic	4–0	Glentoran II

=== Semi-finals ===
Team 1	Score	Team 2
Belfast Celtic	2–1	Belfast United
Linfield	3–0	Distillery

=== Final ===
30 March 1918

Belfast Celtic	0–0	Linfield
	Report

The Oval, Belfast
Attendance: 17,500
Referee: William Cowan

==== Replay ====
13 April 1918

Belfast Celtic	0–0	Linfield
	Report

Solitude, Belfast
Attendance: 14,000
Referee: William Cowan

==== Second replay ====
24 April 1918

Belfast Celtic	2–0	Linfield
Foye (o.g.); Stewart	Report

Grosvenor Park, Belfast
Attendance: 11,000
Referee: William Cowan
