= 1955–56 Irish Cup =

Tournament details
- Country: Northern Ireland
- Teams: 16

Final positions
- Champions: Distillery (11th win)
- Runners-up: Glentoran

Tournament statistics
- Matches played: 20
- Goals scored: 69 (3.45 per match)

The 1955–56 Irish Cup was the 76th edition of the Irish Cup, the premier knock-out cup competition in Northern Irish football.

Distillery won the cup for the 11th time, defeating Glentoran 1–0 in the second final replay at Windsor Park after the previous two matches ended in draws.

Dundela were the holders but they were defeated 5-1 by Linfield Swifts in the first round.

== Results ==
=== First round ===
Team 1	Score	Team 2
Ards	1–1	Glenavon
Ballymena United	0–4	Glentoran
Bangor	2–3	Crusaders
Chimney Corner	1–7	Linfield
Cliftonville	6–0	Carrick Rangers
Coleraine	0–3	Distillery
Derry City	0–2	Portadown
Dundela	1–5	Linfield Swifts

==== Replay ====
Team 1	Score	Team 2
Glenavon	0–0	Ards

==== Second replay ====
Team 1	Score	Team 2
Ards	4–2	Glenavon

=== Quarter-finals ===
Team 1	Score	Team 2
Ards	1–2	Cliftonville
Crusaders	0–4	Distillery
Linfield	1–1	Portadown
Linfield Swifts	0–3	Glentoran

==== Replay ====
Team 1	Score	Team 2
Portadown	2–1	Linfield

=== Semi-finals ===
Team 1	Score	Team 2
Distillery	1–0	Cliftonville
Glentoran	4–0	Portadown

=== Final ===
21 April 1956

Distillery	2–2	Glentoran
McEvoy 52'; Curry 86'	Report	Fogarty 44'; Nolan 83'

Windsor Park, Belfast
Attendance: 20,000
Referee: A. Brown (Middlesbrough)

==== Replay ====
26 April 1956

Distillery	1–1	Glentoran
Tait 14'	Report	Nolan 11'

Windsor Park, Belfast
Attendance: 15,000
Referee: A. Brown (Middlesbrough)

==== Second replay ====
30 April 1956

Distillery	1–0	Glentoran
Curry 61'	Report

Windsor Park, Belfast
Attendance: 12,000
