= 1976–77 Irish Cup =

Tournament details
- Country: Northern Ireland
- Teams: 16

Final positions
- Champions: Coleraine (4th win)
- Runners-up: Linfield

Tournament statistics
- Matches played: 20
- Goals scored: 66 (3.3 per match)

The 1976–77 Irish Cup was the 97th edition of the Irish Cup, Northern Ireland's premier football knock-out cup competition. It began on 5 February 1977, and concluded on 23 April 1977 with the final.

The defending champions were Carrick Rangers after they defeated Linfield 2–1 in the 1975–76 final - one of the biggest shocks in the Cup's history. However, this season they went out in the first round to eventual winners Coleraine, who defeated Linfield 4–1 in the final to condemn the Blues to defeat in the Irish Cup final for the third successive season (a record that still stands), and the fourth time in five years. It was a repeat of the 1974–75 final two years earlier, which was also won by Coleraine.

== Results ==
=== First round ===
| Team 1 | Score | Team 2 |
|---|---|---|
| Bangor | 0–0 | Ards |
| Carrick Rangers | 2–5 | Coleraine |
| Chimney Corner | 0–2 | Larne |
| Cliftonville | 0–2 | Glenavon |
| Distillery | 4–1 | Ballymena United |
| Dundela | 0–6 | Portadown |
| Dungannon Swifts | 1–5 | Crusaders |
| Glentoran | 1–1 | Linfield |

==== Replays ====
| Team 1 | Score | Team 2 |
|---|---|---|
| Ards | 0–0 | Bangor |
| Linfield | 3–0 | Glentoran |

==== Second replay ====
| Team 1 | Score | Team 2 |
|---|---|---|
| Bangor | 1–3 | Ards |

=== Quarter-finals ===
| Team 1 | Score | Team 2 |
|---|---|---|
| Ards | 0–6 | Linfield |
| Crusaders | 0–1 | Coleraine |
| Glenavon | 0–3 | Distillery |
| Portadown | 1–3 | Larne |

=== Semi-finals ===
| Team 1 | Score | Team 2 |
|---|---|---|
| Coleraine | 0–0 | Distillery |
| Larne | 1–1 | Linfield |

==== Replays ====
| Team 1 | Score | Team 2 |
|---|---|---|
| Distillery | 0–3 | Coleraine |
| Linfield | 3–2 | Larne |

=== Final ===
23 April 1977

| Coleraine | 4 – 1 | Linfield |
|---|---|---|
| Beckett 19'; Dickson 74'; Moffatt 75'; Guy 89' | Report | Lemon 32' |

The Oval, Belfast
