= 1935–36 Irish Cup =

Tournament details
- Country: Northern Ireland
- Teams: 16

Final positions
- Champions: Linfield (19th win)
- Runners-up: Derry City

Tournament statistics
- Matches played: 23
- Goals scored: 80 (3.48 per match)

The 1935–36 Irish Cup was the 56th edition of the Irish Cup, the premier knock-out cup competition in Northern Irish football.

Linfield won the tournament for the 19th time, defeating Derry City 2–1 in the replay at Celtic Park, after the previous match had finished in a draw.

== Results ==
=== First round ===
| Team 1 | Score | Team 2 |
|---|---|---|
| Ards | 2–3 | Glentoran II |
| Belfast Celtic | 4–1 | Larne |
| Belfast Celtic II | 3–3 | Derry City |
| Distillery | 5–2 | Coleraine |
| Glenavon | 9–2 | Linfield |
| Glentoran | 1–1 | Cliftonville |
| Newry Town | 3–1 | Bangor |
| Portadown | 3–1 | Ballymena United |

==== Replay ====
| Team 1 | Score | Team 2 |
|---|---|---|
| Cliftonville | 1–2 | Glentoran |
| Derry City | 0–0 | Belfast Celtic II |

==== Second replay ====
| Team 1 | Score | Team 2 |
|---|---|---|
| Belfast Celtic II | 1–3 | Derry City |

=== Quarter-finals ===
| Team 1 | Score | Team 2 |
|---|---|---|
| Belfast Celtic | 1–1 | Newry Town |
| Glentoran | 0–4 | Derry City |
| Glentoran II | 3–1 | Distillery |
| Linfield | 0–0 | Portadown |

==== Replay ====
| Team 1 | Score | Team 2 |
|---|---|---|
| Newry Town | 1–1 | Belfast Celtic |
| Portadown | 1–3 | Linfield |

==== Second replay ====
| Team 1 | Score | Team 2 |
|---|---|---|
| Belfast Celtic | 0–0 | Newry Town |

==== Third replay ====
| Team 1 | Score | Team 2 |
|---|---|---|
| Newry Town | 1–5 | Belfast Celtic |

=== Semi-finals ===
| Team 1 | Score | Team 2 |
|---|---|---|
| Derry City | 3–0 | Glentoran II |
| Linfield | 1–0 | Belfast Celtic |

=== Final ===
4 April 1936

| Linfield | 0–0 | Derry City |
|---|---|---|
| | Report |

Celtic Park, Belfast
Attendance: 22,000
Referee: J. Thompson (Northumberland)

==== Replay ====
8 April 1936

| Linfield | 2–1 (a.e.t.) | Derry City |
|---|---|---|
| Baird 53'; McCormick 93' | Report | Kelly 10' |

Celtic Park, Belfast
Attendance: 14,000
Referee: J. Thompson (Northumberland)
