= 1936–37 Irish Cup =

Tournament details
- Country: Northern Ireland
- Teams: 16

Final positions
- Champions: Belfast Celtic (3rd win)
- Runners-up: Linfield

Tournament statistics
- Matches played: 20
- Goals scored: 71 (3.55 per match)

The 1936–37 Irish Cup was the 57th edition of the Irish Cup, the premier knock-out cup competition in Northern Irish football.

Belfast Celtic won the tournament for the 3rd time, defeating the holders Linfield 3–0 in the final at The Oval.

== Results ==
=== First round ===
Team 1	Score	Team 2
Ballymena United	5–1	Ards
Bangor	2–3	Newry Town
Cliftonville	2–1	Larne
Crusaders	1–4	Belfast Celtic
Derry City	4–1	Distillery
Glentoran	3–0	Belfast Celtic II
Linfield	7–1	Coleraine
Portadown	2–0	Glenavon

=== Quarter-finals ===
Team 1	Score	Team 2
Ballymena United	1–0	Derry City
Cliftonville	0–1	Belfast Celtic
Glentoran	0–0	Linfield
Portadown	0–0	Newry Town

==== Replay ====
Team 1	Score	Team 2
Linfield	6–1	Glentoran
Newry Town	2–2	Portadown

==== Second replay ====
Team 1	Score	Team 2
Portadown	3–4	Newry Town

=== Semi-finals ===
Team 1	Score	Team 2
Belfast Celtic	1–1	Ballymena United
Linfield	2–2	Newry Town

==== Replay ====
Team 1	Score	Team 2
Belfast Celtic	3–0	Ballymena United
Linfield	2–0	Newry Town

=== Final ===
10 April 1937

Belfast Celtic	3–0	Linfield
Turnbull 5', 64', 88'	Report

The Oval, Belfast
Attendance: 15,540
Referee: T. Thompson (Northumberland)
