= Jim McGhee =

Scottish footballer (1930–2019)

Personal information
- Full name: James William McGhee
- Date of birth: 21 August 1930
- Place of birth: Motherwell, Scotland
- Date of death: October 2019 (aged 89)
- Place of death: Motherwell, Scotland
- Positions: Left winger; centre forward

Senior career*
Years	Team	Apps	(Gls)
- Forth Wanderers
1948–1952	Kilmarnock	6	(4)
1952–1953	Darlington	15	(4)
1953–1954	Barry Town		
1954–1955	Newport County	11	(1)
1955–1956	Morton	12	(2)
1956–19??	Ballymena United		
- * Club domestic league appearances and goals

James William McGhee (21 August 1930 – October 2019) was a Scottish footballer who played on the left wing or at centre forward. He appeared in the Scottish League for Kilmarnock and Morton and in the English League for Darlington and Newport County. He also played for Southern League club Barry Town, and for Ballymena United of the Irish League, for whom he scored one of the goals as they beat Linfield 2–0 to win the 1957–58 Irish Cup.
