= 1906–07 Irish Cup =

Tournament details
- Country: Ireland
- Date: 3 November 1906 – 20 April 1907
- Teams: 10

Final positions
- Champions: Cliftonville (6th win)
- Runners-up: Shelbourne

Tournament statistics
- Matches played: 11
- Goals scored: 33 (3 per match)

The 1906–07 Irish Cup was the 27th edition of the Irish Cup, the premier knock-out cup competition in Irish football.

Cliftonville won the tournament for the 6th time, defeating Shelbourne 1–0 in the final replay, after a 0–0 draw in the original final.

== Results ==
=== First round ===
Team 1	Score	Team 2
Belfast Celtic	3–1	Glentoran
Bohemians	0–1	Shelbourne
Linfield	5–0	Distillery
Reginald	4–0	Dublin University
Cliftonville	bye	
Derry Celtic	bye	

=== Quarter-finals ===
Team 1	Score	Team 2
Belfast Celtic	1–0	Derry Celtic
Cliftonville	6–1	Reginald
Linfield	bye	
Shelbourne	bye	

=== Semi-finals ===
Team 1	Score	Team 2
Cliftonville	2–2	Linfield
Shelbourne	1–0	Belfast Celtic

==== Replay ====
Team 1	Score	Team 2
Cliftonville	3–2	Linfield

=== Final ===
23 March 1907

Cliftonville	0–0	Shelbourne
	Report

Celtic Park, Belfast

==== Replay ====
20 April 1907

Cliftonville	1–0	Shelbourne
Beattie 85'	Report

Dalymount Park, Dublin
Attendance: 10,000
