= 1970–71 Irish Cup =

Tournament details
- Country: Northern Ireland
- Teams: 16

Final positions
- Champions: Distillery (12th win)
- Runners-up: Derry City

Tournament statistics
- Matches played: 17
- Goals scored: 59 (3.47 per match)

The 1970–71 Irish Cup was the 91st edition of the Irish Cup, the premier knock-out cup competition in Northern Irish football.

Distillery won the cup for the 12th time, defeating Derry City 3–0 in the final at Windsor Park.

The holders Linfield were eliminated in the semi-final by Derry City.

== Results ==
=== First round ===
Team 1	Score	Team 2
Ballyclare Comrades	1–2	Distillery
Carrick Rangers	3–3	Derry City
Chimney Corner	2–0	Ards
Crusaders	3–1	Cliftonville
Glenavon	6–0	Ards Rangers
Glentoran	0–1	Ballymena United
Linfield	1–0	Bangor
Portadown	3–6	Coleraine

==== Replay ====
Team 1	Score	Team 2
Derry City	4–2	Carrick Rangers

=== Quarter-finals ===
Team 1	Score	Team 2
Coleraine	2–0	Ballymena United
Derry City	2–1	Chimney Corner
Glenavon	0–2	Distillery
Linfield	4–1	Crusaders

=== Semi-finals ===
Team 1	Score	Team 2
Distillery	1–1	Coleraine
Derry City	1–0	Linfield

==== Replay ====
Team 1	Score	Team 2
Distillery	2–1	Coleraine

=== Final ===
3 April 1971

Distillery	3–0	Derry City
O'Neill 3', 48'; Savage 50'	Report

Windsor Park, Belfast
Attendance: 6,000
Referee: Malcolm Wright (Portadown)
