= 1950–51 Irish Cup =

Tournament details
- Country: Northern Ireland
- Teams: 16

Final positions
- Champions: Glentoran (7th win)
- Runners-up: Ballymena United

Tournament statistics
- Matches played: 19
- Goals scored: 76 (4 per match)

The 1950–51 Irish Cup was the 71st edition of the Irish Cup, the premier knock-out cup competition in Northern Irish football.

The defending champions were Linfield, however they were defeated 3–1 in the semi-finals by Glentoran.

Glentoran won the cup for the 7th time, defeating Ballymena United 3–1 in the final at Windsor Park.

== Results ==
=== First round ===
Team 1	Score	Team 2
Ballyclare Comrades	0–0	Linfield
Ballymena United	2–1	Coleraine
Brantwood	3–1	Derry City
Cliftonville	8–0	Ballymoney United
Crusaders	3–2	Distillery
Glenavon	2–2	Ards
Glentoran	9–0	Cogry Mills
Portadown	4–2	Bangor

==== Replay ====
Team 1	Score	Team 2
Ards	3–1	Glenavon
Linfield	3–3	Ballyclare Comrades

==== Second replay ====
Team 1	Score	Team 2
Linfield	3–1	Ballyclare Comrades

=== Quarter-finals ===
Team 1	Score	Team 2
Ards	0–1	Portadown
Cliftonville	2–2	Ballymena United
Glentoran	2–0	Brantwood
Linfield	0–0	Crusaders

==== Replay ====
Team 1	Score	Team 2
Crusaders	2–3	Linfield

=== Semi-finals ===
Team 1	Score	Team 2
Ballymena United	2–1	Portadown
Glentoran	3–1	Linfield

=== Final ===
28 April 1951

Glentoran	3–1	Ballymena United
Williamson 8'; Hughes 52', 84'	Report	Currie 61'

Windsor Park, Belfast
Attendance: 25,000
Referee: W. H. E. Evans (Liverpool)
