= 1930–31 Irish Cup =

Tournament details
- Country: Northern Ireland
- Teams: 16

Final positions
- Champions: Linfield (17th win)
- Runners-up: Ballymena

Tournament statistics
- Matches played: 16
- Goals scored: 75 (4.69 per match)

The 1930–31 Irish Cup was the 51st edition of the Irish Cup, the premier knock-out cup competition in Northern Irish football.

In a repeat of the previous season's final, Linfield won the tournament for the 17th time, defeating Ballymena 3–0 in the final at The Oval.

== Results ==
=== First round ===
Team 1	Score	Team 2
Ballymena	2–1	Cliftonville
Derry City	2–0	Glentoran II
Distillery	1–2	Bangor
Glenavon	4–1	Broadway United
Glentoran	7–4	Ards
Larne	2–4	Linfield
Newry Town	1–2	Coleraine
Portadown	2–4	Belfast Celti

=== Quarter-finals ===
Team 1	Score	Team 2
Bangor	2–2	Ballymena
Belfast Celtic	2–3	Linfield
Derry City	5–0	Glenavon
Glentoran	6–2	Coleraine

==== Replay ====
Team 1	Score	Team 2
Ballymena	2–0	Bangor

=== Semi-finals ===
Team 1	Score	Team 2
Ballymena	2–1	Derry City
Linfield	5–1	Glentoran

=== Final ===
28 March 1931

Linfield	3–0	Ballymena
Hewitt 65'; Houston 80'; McCracken 83'	Report

The Oval, Belfast
Attendance: 20,000
Referee: H.E. Hull
