= 1937–38 Irish Cup =

Tournament details
- Country: Northern Ireland
- Teams: 16

Final positions
- Champions: Belfast Celtic (4th win)
- Runners-up: Bangor

Tournament statistics
- Matches played: 23
- Goals scored: 63 (2.74 per match)

The 1937–38 Irish Cup was the 58th edition of the Irish Cup, the premier knock-out cup competition in Northern Irish football.

Belfast Celtic won the tournament for the 4th time and second consecutive season, defeating Bangor 2–0 in the final replay at Solitude after the first match ended in a draw.

== Results ==
=== First round ===
Team 1	Score	Team 2
Ballymena United	3–2	Linfield
Belfast Celtic	3–0	Portadown
Cliftonville	2–7	Derry City
Crusaders	1–2	Glentoran
Glenavon	1–1	Distillery
Larne	0–1	Bangor
Linfield Swifts	2–1	Coleraine
Newry Town	3–0	Ards

==== Replay ====
Team 1	Score	Team 2
Distillery	1–6	Glenavon

=== Quarter-finals ===
Team 1	Score	Team 2
Bangor	2–0	Linfield Swifts
Belfast Celtic	0–0	Ballymena United
Derry City	2–1	Newry Town
Glentoran	1–1	Glenavon

==== Replay ====
Team 1	Score	Team 2
Ballymena United	0–0	Belfast Celtic
Glenavon	0–0	Glentoran

==== Second replay ====
Team 1	Score	Team 2
Belfast Celtic	1–0	Ballymena United
Glentoran	2–1	Glenavon

=== Semi-finals ===
Team 1	Score	Team 2
Bangor	2–2	Derry City
Belfast Celtic	1–1	Glentoran

==== Replay ====
Team 1	Score	Team 2
Bangor	3–1	Derry City
Belfast Celtic	3–1	Glentoran

=== Final ===
9 April 1938

Belfast Celtic	0–0	Bangor
	Report

Solitude, Belfast
Attendance: 12,000
Referee: T. Thompson (Northumberland)

==== Replay ====
7 May 1938

Belfast Celtic	2–0	Bangor
McAlinden 14'; Bruce 25'	Report

Solitude, Belfast
Attendance: 10,000
Referee: R. A. Mortimer (Huddersfield)
