= 1973–74 Irish Cup =

Tournament details
- Country: Northern Ireland
- Teams: 16

Final positions
- Champions: Ards (4th win)
- Runners-up: Ballymena United

Tournament statistics
- Matches played: 20
- Goals scored: 86 (4.3 per match)

The 1973–74 Irish Cup was the 94th edition of the Irish Cup, the premier knock-out cup competition in Northern Irish football.

Ards won the cup for the 4th time, defeating Ballymena United 2–1 in the final at Windsor Park.

The holders Glentoran were eliminated in the first round by Crusaders.

== Results ==
=== First round ===
Team 1	Score	Team 2
Ballyclare Comrades	1–1	Ards
Bangor	5–2	Portadown
Cliftonville	0–0	Chimney Corner
Coleraine	5–3	Distillery
Cromac Albion	1–3	Larne
Glentoran	1–4	Crusaders
Linfield	1–2	Ballymena United
RUC	1–5	Glenavon

==== Replay ====
Team 1	Score	Team 2
Ards	4–2	Ballyclare Comrades
Chimney Corner	3–3	Cliftonville

==== Second replay ====
Team 1	Score	Team 2
Chimney Corner	3–0	Cliftonville

=== Quarter-finals ===
Team 1	Score	Team 2
Ards	4–2	Bangor
Ballymena United	7–1	Crusaders
Chimney Corner	0–3	Larne
Coleraine	0–2	Glenavon

=== Semi-finals ===
Team 1	Score	Team 2
Ards	4–2	Glenavon
Ballymena United	1–1	Larne

==== Replay ====
Team 1	Score	Team 2
Ballymena United	1–1	Larne

==== Second replay ====
Team 1	Score	Team 2
Ballymena United	2–2 (4–3 p)	Larne

=== Final ===
27 April 1974

Ards	2–1	Ballymena United
Guy 15'; McAvoy 65'	Report	Sloan 57'

Windsor Park, Belfast
Attendance: 7,000
