= 1931–32 Irish Cup =

Tournament details
- Country: Northern Ireland
- Teams: 16

Final positions
- Champions: Glentoran (4th win)
- Runners-up: Linfield

Tournament statistics
- Matches played: 22
- Goals scored: 90 (4.09 per match)

The 1931–32 Irish Cup was the 52nd edition of the Irish Cup, the premier knock-out cup competition in Northern Irish football.

Glentoran won the tournament for the 4th time, defeating Linfield 2–1 in the final at Celtic Park.

== Results ==
=== First round ===
Team 1	Score	Team 2
Ballymena	3–1	Distillery
Bangor	3–1	Broadway United
Cliftonville	1–1	Belfast Celtic
Coleraine	2–3	Ards
Derry City	0–0	Newry Town
Glentoran	6–1	Belfast Celtic II
Larne	4–7	Linfield
Portadown	3–1	Glenavon

==== Replay ====
Team 1	Score	Team 2
Belfast Celtic	1–0	Cliftonville
Newry Town	1–1	Derry City

==== Second replay ====
Team 1	Score	Team 2
Derry City	3–1	Newry Town

=== Quarter-finals ===
Team 1	Score	Team 2
Ballymena	2–2	Glentoran
Bangor	2–3	Portadown
Derry City	3–3	Belfast Celtic
Linfield	5–2	Ards

==== Replay ====
Team 1	Score	Team 2
Belfast Celtic	3–1	Derry City
Glentoran	2–1	Ballymena

=== Semi-finals ===
Team 1	Score	Team 2
Glentoran	2–1	Portadown
Linfield	2–2	Belfast Celtic

==== Replay ====
Team 1	Score	Team 2
Linfield	2–2	Belfast Celtic

==== Second replay ====
Team 1	Score	Team 2
Linfield	2–1	Belfast Celtic

=== Final ===
26 March 1932

Glentoran	2–1	Linfield
Lucas 72'; Roberts 75'	Report	Bambrick 58'

Celtic Park, Belfast
Referee: J. Thompson
