= 1949–50 Irish Cup =

Tournament details
- Country: Northern Ireland
- Teams: 16

Final positions
- Champions: Linfield (25th win)
- Runners-up: Distillery

Tournament statistics
- Matches played: 16
- Goals scored: 52 (3.25 per match)

The 1949–50 Irish Cup was the 70th edition of the Irish Cup, the premier knock-out cup competition in Northern Irish football.

The defending champions were Derry City, however they were defeated 2–0 in the semi-finals by Linfield.

Linfield won the cup for the 25th time, defeating Distillery 2–1 in the final at Windsor Park.

== Results ==
=== First round ===
Team 1	Score	Team 2
Albert Foundry	1–2	Crusaders
Banbridge Town	0–2	Ards
Bangor	2–1	Ballymena United
Derry City	4–0	Cliftonville
Distillery	1–0	Ballyclare Comrades
Glentoran	4–0	Coleraine
Linfield Swifts	0–0	Glenavon
Portadown	0–4	Linfield

==== Replay ====
Team 1	Score	Team 2
Glenavon	2–3	Linfield Swifts

=== Quarter-finals ===
Team 1	Score	Team 2
Crusaders	1–7	Distillery
Derry City	2–0	Ards
Linfield	3–0	Glentoran
Linfield Swifts	3–0	Bangor

=== Semi-finals ===
Team 1	Score	Team 2
Distillery	5–1	Linfield Swifts
Linfield	1–0	Derry City

=== Final ===
22 April 1950

Linfield	2–1	Distillery
Thompson 25'; McDowell 88'	Report	Mycock 63'

Windsor Park, Belfast
Attendance: 17,000
Referee: G. S. Cox (Rutherglen)
