= 1913–14 Irish Cup =

Tournament details
- Country: Ireland
- Date: 24 January 1914 – 28 March 1914
- Teams: 9

Final positions
- Champions: Glentoran (1st win)
- Runners-up: Linfield

Tournament statistics
- Matches played: 16
- Goals scored: 36 (2.25 per match)

The 1913–14 Irish Cup was the 34th edition of the Irish Cup, the premier knock-out cup competition in Irish football.

Glentoran won the tournament for the 1st time, defeating Linfield 3–1 in the final.

== Results ==
=== First round ===
Team 1	Score	Team 2
Bohemians	0–1	Belfast Celtic
Distillery	0–0	Glentoran
Shelbourne	7–0	Cliftonville
St James's Gate	0–1	Linfield
Glenavon	bye	

==== Replay ====
Team 1	Score	Team 2
Glentoran	1–1	Distillery

==== Second replay ====
Team 1	Score	Team 2
Distillery	1–1	Glentoran

==== Third replay ====
Team 1	Score	Team 2
Glentoran	0–0	Distillery

==== Fourth replay ====
Team 1	Score	Team 2
Distillery	1–2	Glentoran

=== Quarter-finals ===
Team 1	Score	Team 2
Belfast Celtic	1–1	Shelbourne
Glenavon	bye	
Glentoran	bye	
Linfield	bye	

==== Replay ====
Team 1	Score	Team 2
Shelbourne	1–0	Belfast Celtic

=== Semi-finals ===
Team 1	Score	Team 2
Glentoran	1–1	Shelbourne
Linfield	4–2	Glenavon

==== Replay ====
Team 1	Score	Team 2
Glentoran	1–1	Shelbourne

==== Second replay ====
Team 1	Score	Team 2
Glentoran	0–0	Shelbourne

==== Third replay ====
Team 1	Score	Team 2
Glentoran	2–1	Shelbourne

=== Final ===
28 March 1914

Glentoran	3–1	Linfield
J. Lindsay; W. Lindsay	Report	McEwan

Grosvenor Park, Belfast
Attendance: 20,000
Referee: J. Baker
