= Davy Cochrane =

Northern Irish footballer

Personal information
- Full name: David Andrew Cochrane
- Date of birth: 14 August 1920
- Place of birth: Portadown, Northern Ireland
- Date of death: June 2000 (aged 79)
- Height: 5 ft 4 in (1.63 m)
- Position: Winger

Youth career
- 1935–1937: Portadown

Senior career*
Years	Team	Apps	(Gls)
1937–1951	Leeds United	172	(28)

International career
1938–1949	Ireland	12	(0)
- * Club domestic league appearances and goals

David Andrew Cochrane (14 August 1920 – June 2000) was an Ireland international footballer who played in the Football League for Leeds United.
