= 1889–90 Irish Cup =

Tournament details
- Country: Ireland
- Date: 19 October 1889 – 12 April 1890
- Teams: 31

Final positions
- Champions: Gordon Highlanders (1st win)
- Runners-up: Cliftonville

Tournament statistics
- Matches played: 29
- Goals scored: 188 (6.48 per match)

The 1889–90 Irish Cup was the 10th edition of the Irish Cup, the premier knock-out cup competition in Irish football.

Gordon Highlanders (a British Army team) won the tournament for the 1st and only time, defeating Cliftonville 3–0 in the final replay, after an initial 2–2 draw.

== Results ==
=== First round ===
Team 1	Score	Team 2
Belfast Athletics	0–5	Black Watch
Glentoran	2–2	Gordon Highlanders
Linfield	10–0	North End Athletic
Cliftonville	8–2	Milford
Distillery	10–0	Belfast Caledonians
Oldpark	0–3	Distillery Rovers
Ulster	w/o	YMCA
Whiteabbey	w/o	Clarence
Kilrea	w/o	Magherafelt
Victoria (R.I.C)	0–13	Limavady
St Columb's Court	4–2	Rock
Strabane	1–1	Rosemount
East Lancashire Regiment	11–1	Seapatrick
Dublin University	1–3	Dublin Association
Queen's College	bye	
St Columb's Court Reserves	bye	
Hilden	bye	

==== Replays ====
Team 1	Score	Team 2
Gordon Highlanders	4–2	Glentoran
Rosemount	w/o	Strabane

=== Second round ===
Team 1	Score	Team 2
Distillery	3–3	Linfield
Cliftonville	6–4	Black Watch
Distillery Rovers	w/o	Magherafelt
Gordon Highlanders	3–1	Ulster
Queen's College	0–4	East Lancashire Regiment
Dublin Association	bye	
Clarence	1–2	Hilden
Rosemount	w/o	St Columb's Court Reserves
Limavady	1–0^{1}	St Columb's Court

- ^{1} Match was ordered to be replayed after a protest by St Columb's Court regarding Limavady's rough play.

==== Replays ====
Team 1	Score	Team 2
Linfield	4–2	Distillery
St Columb's Court	2–5	Limavady

=== Third round ===
Team 1	Score	Team 2
Limavady	12–1	Rosemount
Hilden	1–6	Linfield
Gordon Highlanders	7–2	Distillery Rovers
Cliftonville	5–1	East Lancashire Regiment
Dublin Association	bye	

=== Fourth round ===
Team 1	Score	Team 2
Dublin Association	6–2	Limavady
Cliftonville	bye	
Gordon Highlanders	bye	
Linfield	bye	

=== Semi-finals ===
Team 1	Score	Team 2
Cliftonville	3–2^{1}	Dublin Association
Gordon Highlanders	2–1	Linfield

- ^{1} Match was ordered to be replayed after a protest.

==== Replay ====
Team 1	Score	Team 2
Cliftonville	4–2	Dublin Association

=== Final ===
8 March 1890

Gordon Highlanders	2–2	Cliftonville
Swan; Archibald	Report	Wilton; Small

Ulster Cricket Ground, Belfast
Attendance: 4,500

==== Replay ====
12 April 1890

Gordon Highlanders	3–0	Cliftonville
Swan; Beveridge	Report

Ulsterville, Belfast
Attendance: 3,500
