= 1886–87 Irish Cup =

Tournament details
- Country: Ireland
- Date: 23 October 1886 – 12 February 1887
- Teams: 38

Final positions
- Champions: Ulster (1st win)
- Runners-up: Cliftonville

Tournament statistics
- Matches played: 39
- Goals scored: 203 (5.21 per match)

The 1886–87 Irish Cup was the 7th edition of the Irish Cup, the premier knock-out cup competition in Irish football.

Ulster won the tournament for the 1st time, defeating Cliftonville 3–1 in the final. The holders Distillery were eliminated in the fourth round by Glentoran.

== Results ==
=== First round ===
| Team 1 | Score | Team 2 |
|---|---|---|
| Victoria (R.I.C.) | 0-5 | Limavady |
| Kilrea | 3–0 | Magherafelt |
| Whiteabbey | 3–2 | Ballyclare |
| Mossley | 3–1 | Templepatrick |
| Hilden | 2–0 | Hertford |
| Millmount | 3–1 | Banbridge |
| Milford | 1–1 | Loughgall |
| Glentoran | 4–0 | Beechmount |
| North Down | 3–3 | Mountcollyer |
| Distillery | 8–0 | Genoa |
| Linfield Athletic | 10–2 | Mercantile |
| St Malachy's College | 4–3 | Belfast Athletics |
| Down Athletics | 0–6 | Wellington Park |
| Cliftonville | w/o | Montalto |
| Dublin University | 2–2 | Oldpark |
| Clarence | 2–2 | YMCA |
| Ulster | 6–0 | Clifton Park |
| Dublin Association | w/o | Albert |
| Rosemount | bye | |
| Moyola Park | bye | |

==== Replays ====
| Team 1 | Score | Team 2 |
|---|---|---|
| Loughgall | 0–1 | Milford |
| Oldpark | 6–4 | Dublin University |
| YMCA | 2–1 | Clarence |
| Mountcollyer | 5–0 | North Down |

=== Second round ===
| Team 1 | Score | Team 2 |
|---|---|---|
| St Malachy's College | 2–1 | Wellington Park |
| Distillery | 3–0 | Linfield Athletic |
| Cliftonville | 2–0^{2} | Oldpark |
| YMCA | w/o | Dublin Association |
| Glentoran | 6–1 | Mountcollyer |
| Ulster | 9–0 | Hilden |
| Millmount | 1-2^{3} | Milford |
| Kilrea | w/o^{1} | Moyola Park |
| Rosemount | 0–8 | Limavady |
| Whiteabbey | 4–4 | Mossley |

^{1} Although Moyola Park scratched to Kilrea, a protest from Magherafelt from the previous round led to the Irish Football Association to order Kilrea to re-play their first round match with Magherafelt. Kilrea refused but were subsequently reinstated.

^{2} Oldpark protested that the referee had called time early and a replay was ordered.

^{3} Millmount protested and the match was ordered to be replayed

==== Replay ====
| Team 1 | Score | Team 2 |
|---|---|---|
| Mossley | 1-1 | Whiteabbey |
| Cliftonville | w/o | Oldpark |
| Milford | 3-6 | Millmount |

==== Second replay ====
| Team 1 | Score | Team 2 |
|---|---|---|
| Whiteabbey | 6–5 | Mossley |

=== Third round ===
| Team 1 | Score | Team 2 |
|---|---|---|
| Whiteabbey | 2–5 | St Malachy's College |
| Cliftonville | bye | |
| Glentoran | bye | |
| Distillery | bye | |
| Millmount | bye | |
| Kilrea | 2-9 | Limavady |
| Ulster | bye | |
| YMCA | bye | |

=== Fourth round ===
| Team 1 | Score | Team 2 |
|---|---|---|
| Cliftonville | 10–1 | St Malachy's College |
| Glentoran | 2–1 | Distillery |
| Millmount | 0–5 | Limavady |
| YMCA | 2-2 | Ulster |

==== Replay ====
| Team 1 | Score | Team 2 |
|---|---|---|
| Ulster | 3–2^{4} | YMCA |

^{4} YMCA protested and the match was ordered to be replayed

==== Second Replay ====
| Team 1 | Score | Team 2 |
|---|---|---|
| Ulster | 6–0 | YMCA |

=== Semi-finals ===
| Team 1 | Score | Team 2 |
|---|---|---|
| Cliftonville | 2–0 | Limavady |
| Ulster | 2–1 | Glentoran |

=== Final ===
12 February 1887

| Ulster | 3–1 | Cliftonville |
|---|---|---|
| Mears; Jack Reid; Watson | Report | Turner |

Broadway Ground, Belfast
Attendance: 4,000
