= 1887–88 Irish Cup =

Tournament details
- Country: Ireland
- Date: 29 October 1887 – 17 March 1888
- Teams: 35

Final positions
- Champions: Cliftonville (2nd win)
- Runners-up: Distillery

Tournament statistics
- Matches played: 32
- Goals scored: 178 (5.56 per match)

The 1887–88 Irish Cup was the 8th edition of the Irish Cup, the premier knock-out cup competition in Irish football.

Cliftonville won the tournament for the 2nd time, defeating Distillery 2–1 in the final. The holders Ulster were eliminated in the quarter-finals by Distillery.

== Results ==
=== First round ===
Team 1	Score	Team 2
Clarence	6–0	Mossley
Belfast Athletics	4–2	Dublin Association
Distillery	18–0	United Steamship
Cliftonville	3–2	YMCA
Oldpark	10–1	Whiterock
Dublin University	w/o	North Down
North End	w/o	Linfield Athletic
Montalto	0–10	Glentoran
Ulster	13–0	Evening Telegraph
East End	0–5	Albert
Mountcollyer	8–1^{1}	Whiteabbey
Portglenone	w/o	Moyola Park
Kilrea	1–2	Magherafelt
Rock	1–0	Portrush
Strabane	2-11	Limavady
St Columb's Court	5–0	Rosemount
Hilden	0–2	Hertford
Millmount	bye	

^{1} Whiteabbey protested about an opposition player's shirt colour and a replay was ordered.

==== Replay ====
Team 1	Score	Team 2
Whiteabbey	0-11	Mountcollyer

=== Second round ===
Team 1	Score	Team 2
Ulster	4–1	Glentoran
Linfield Athletic	6–0	Belfast Athletics
Clarence	1–3	Oldpark
Cliftonville	8–2	Dublin University
Mountcollyer	6–0	Albert
Portglenone	0–2	Magherafelt
Millmount	w/o	Hertford
Rock	1-3	St Columb's Court
Distillery	bye	
Limavady	bye	

=== Third round ===
Team 1	Score	Team 2
St Columb's Court	1-5	Limavady
Millmount	0–2	Linfield Athletic
Distillery	3–1	Magherafelt
Ulster	bye	
Oldpark	bye	
Cliftonville	bye	
Mountcollyer	bye	

=== Fourth round ===
Team 1	Score	Team 2
Cliftonville	3–3	Limavady
Oldpark	1–1	Mountcollyer
Ulster	0–2	Distillery
Linfield Athletic	bye	

==== Replays ====
Team 1	Score	Team 2
Cliftonville	5–3	Limavady
Mountcollyer	2-3^{2}	Oldpark

^{2} Mountcollyer protested the referee's IFA status and a replay was ordered.

==== Second Replay ====
Team 1	Score	Team 2
Oldpark	5-1	Mountcollyer

=== Semi-finals ===
Team 1	Score	Team 2
Cliftonville	5–0	Linfield Athletic
Distillery	3–1	Oldpark

=== Final ===
17 March 1888

Cliftonville	2–1	Distillery
Barry; Gibb	Report	Stanfield

Ulster Cricket Ground, Belfast
Attendance: 3,000
