= 1890–91 Irish Cup =

Tournament details
- Country: Ireland
- Date: 4 October 1890 – 14 March 1891
- Teams: 42

Final positions
- Champions: Linfield (1st win)
- Runners-up: Ulster

Tournament statistics
- Matches played: 31
- Goals scored: 183 (5.9 per match)

The 1890–91 Irish Cup was the 11th edition of the Irish Cup, the premier knock-out cup competition in Irish football.

Linfield won the tournament for the 1st time, defeating Ulster 4–2 in the final.

== Results ==
=== First round ===
Team 1	Score	Team 2
Down Athletics	w/o	Distillery Rovers
Distillery	1–4	Ulster
Cliftonville	3–2 (a.e.t.)^{1}	Black Watch
Glentoran	3–6	Oldpark
Hilden	w/o	Whiteabbey
Donacloney	4–8	Clarence
Linfield	w/o	Milford
Moyola Park	w/o	Magherafelt
Coleraine YMCA	1–1	Kilrea
Young Ireland	2–0	Sentinel
Glendermott	w/o	St Columb's Court Swifts
Young Volunteers	0–2	St Columb's Court Wanderers
Limavady	w/o	Limavady Reserves
St Columb's Hall	w/o	Buncrana
Rosemount	w/o	Rock
Clooney Park	3–0	Olympic
St Columb's Court	12–0	Ivy
City Factory	1–5	Victoria (R.I.C.)
Strabane	2–2	Omagh Wanderers
Sion Mills	4–2 (a.e.t.)	Newtownstewart
Dublin University	bye	
Gordon Highlanders	bye	

^{1} Match ordered to be replayed after Black Watch protested it was too dark to finish the match.

==== Replays ====
Team 1	Score	Team 2
Omagh Wanderers	3–2^{1}	Strabane
Kilrea	4–1	Coleraine YMCA
Black Watch	w/o^{2}	Cliftonville

^{1} Match was ordered to be replayed on the grounds that no touchline had been drawn.
^{2} Cliftonville scratched (withdrew) after claiming that the ordering of a replay with 24 hours notice did not give them enough time to prepare.

==== Second replay ====
Team 1	Score	Team 2
Strabane	0–3	Omagh Wanderers

=== Second round ===
Team 1	Score	Team 2
Hilden	1–12	Ulster
Distillery Rovers	0–1	Black Watch
Linfield	9–0	Oldpark
Dublin University	w/o	Gordon Highlanders
Kilrea	1–4	Moyola Park
Limavady	w/o	St Columb's Court Wanderers
Glendermott	1–8	Clooney Park
Young Ireland	2–4	St Columb's Hall
Glendermott	w/o	St Columb's Swifts
St Columb's Court	w/o	Victoria (R.I.C.)
Omagh Wanderers	w/o	Sion Mills
Clarence	bye	
Rock	bye	

=== Third round ===
Team 1	Score	Team 2
Moyola Park	2–4	Clarence
Ulster	6–4	Gordon Highlanders
Linfield	4–3	Black Watch
Rock	w/o	St Columb's Hall
Clooney Park	1–2 (a.e.t.)	Omagh Wanderers
St Columb's Court	2–0	Limavady

=== Fourth round ===
Team 1	Score	Team 2
Omagh Wanderers	0–6	St Columb's Court
St Columb's Hall	0–7	Ulster
Clarence	bye	
Linfield	bye	

=== Semi-finals ===
Team 1	Score	Team 2
Linfield	9–0	St Columb's Court
Ulster	6–2	Clarence

=== Final ===
14 March 1891

Linfield	4–2	Ulster
Hill; Torrans; Gaffiken; Flanelly (o.g.)	Report	Tierney; McIlvenny

Solitude, Belfast
Attendance: 5,000
