= 1894–95 Irish Cup =

Tournament details
- Country: Ireland
- Date: 29 September 1894 – 23 March 1895
- Teams: 21

Final positions
- Champions: Linfield (4th win)
- Runners-up: Bohemians

Tournament statistics
- Matches played: 23
- Goals scored: 107 (4.65 per match)

The 1894–95 Irish Cup was the 15th edition of the Irish Cup, the premier knock-out cup competition in Irish football.

Linfield won the tournament for the 4th time, defeating Bohemians 10–1 in the final. This remains both the largest margin of victory and the highest scoring Irish Cup final in history.

== Results ==
- St Columb's Court, Bright Stars, Royal West Kent Regiment (a British Army team based in Derry), Derry North End, Limavady, St Columb's Hall Celtic, Royal Inniskilling Fusiliers (a British Army team based in Enniskillen) and Strabane were all given byes into the second round.
- Cliftonville, Distillery, Donacloney, Glentoran, Linfield, 13th Hussars (a British Army team based in Dundalk) and Moyola Park were given byes into the third round.
- Dublin University, Leinster Nomads, Bohemians and Montpelier were given byes into the fourth round.

=== First round ===
Team 1	Score	Team 2
Celtic	4–0	Belview

- After winning their match Celtic were given a bye into the third round.

=== Second round ===
Team 1	Score	Team 2
St Columb's Court	w/o	Bright Stars
Royal West Kent Regiment	1–1	Derry North End
Limavady	0–2	St Columb's Hall Celtic
Royal Inniskilling Fusiliers	2–2	Strabane

==== Replays ====
Team 1	Score	Team 2
Derry North End	0–3	Royal West Kent Regiment
Strabane	0–0	Royal Inniskilling Fusiliers

==== Second replay ====
Team 1	Score	Team 2
Royal Inniskilling Fusiliers	2–0	Strabane

=== Third round ===
Team 1	Score	Team 2
Cliftonville	0–5	Distillery
Donacloney	2–7	Glentoran
Linfield	10–0	13th Hussars
Moyola Park	4–7	Celtic
St Columb's Court	1–0	Royal West Kent Regiment
Royal Inniskilling Fusiliers	1–2	St Columb's Hall Celtic
Britannia	w/o	Montpelier
Dublin University	w/o	Athlone Town
Leinster Nomads	w/o	GPO
St Helen's	w/o	Bohemians

- Teams that won in this round were given a bye into the fifth round.

=== Fourth round ===
Team 1	Score	Team 2
Leinster Nomads	0–2	Dublin University
Bohemians	3–0	Montpelier

=== Fifth round ===
Team 1	Score	Team 2
Bohemians	6–4	Glentoran
Dublin University	1–3	Celtic
Distillery	0–0	Linfield
St Columb's Hall Celtic	3–1	St Columb's Court

==== Replay ====
Team 1	Score	Team 2
Linfield	4–1	Distillery

=== Semi-finals ===
Team 1	Score	Team 2
Bohemians	4–1	St Columb's Hall Celtic
Linfield	6–1	Celtic

=== Final ===
23 March 1895

Linfield	10–1	Bohemians
Milne; McAllen; H. Gordon; Williamson; Gaffikin; Gaukrodger	Report	Blayney

Solitude, Belfast
Attendance: 2,000
