= 1897–98 Irish Cup =

Tournament details
- Country: Ireland
- Date: 23 October 1897 – 19 March 1898
- Teams: 21

Final positions
- Champions: Linfield (5th win)
- Runners-up: St Columb's Hall Celtic

Tournament statistics
- Matches played: 22
- Goals scored: 84 (3.82 per match)

The 1897–98 Irish Cup was the 18th edition of the Irish Cup, the premier knock-out cup competition in Irish football.

Linfield won the tournament for the 5th time, defeating St Columb's Hall Celtic 2–0 in the final.

== Results ==
- Belfast-based teams were given a bye until the second round.

=== First round ===
Team 1	Score	Team 2
North End	1–3	Derry Hibernians
St Columb's Court	0–3	St Columb's Hall Celtic
Strabane	1–2	Royal Inniskilling Fusiliers
Bohemians	4–1	Hibernians
Athlone	w/o	Dundalk
Dublin University	1–5	Yorkshire Regiment
Limavady	bye	
Sherwood Foresters	bye	

=== Second round ===
Team 1	Score	Team 2
Limavady	1–1	Derry Hibernians
Royal Inniskilling Fusiliers	1-7	St Columb's Hall Celtic
Sherwood Foresters	2–2	Yorkshire Regiment
Athlone	w/o	Bohemians
Cliftonville	1–0	Glentoran
Distillery	1–5	Linfield
Celtic	5–1	King's (Liverpool) Regiment
North Staffordshire Regiment	bye	

==== Replays ====
Team 1	Score	Team 2
Derry Hibernians	4–0^{1}	Limavady
Yorkshire Regiment	3–2	Sherwood Foresters

- ^{1} Match ordered to be replayed after Limavady protested there was no segregation on the pitch between players and spectators.

==== Second replay ====
Team 1	Score	Team 2
Limavady	1–2	Derry Hibernians

=== Third round ===
Team 1	Score	Team 2
Bohemians	1–2^{1}	Yorkshire Regiment
St Columb's Hall Celtic	1–0	Derry Hibernians
Linfield	5–0	North Staffordshire Regiment
Cliftonville	2–3	Celtic

- ^{1} Match ordered to be replayed after referee ended the game six minutes early.

==== Replay ====
Team 1	Score	Team 2
Bohemians	w/o	Yorkshire Regiment

=== Semi-finals ===
Team 1	Score	Team 2
St Columb's Hall Celtic	1–0	Bohemians
Celtic	1–1	Linfield

==== Replay ====
Team 1	Score	Team 2
Linfield	2–1	Celtic

=== Final ===
19 March 1898

Linfield	2–0	St Columb's Hall Celtic
Darling; Jordan	Report

The Oval, Belfast
Attendance: 3,000
