= 1898–99 Irish Cup =

Tournament details
- Country: Ireland
- Date: 29 October 1898 – 18 March 1899
- Teams: 33

Final positions
- Champions: Linfield (6th win)
- Runners-up: Glentoran

Tournament statistics
- Matches played: 33
- Goals scored: 130 (3.94 per match)

The 1898–99 Irish Cup was the 19th edition of the Irish Cup, the premier knock-out cup competition in Irish football.

Linfield won the tournament for the 6th time and 2nd year in a row, defeating Glentoran 1–0 in the final.

== Results ==
=== First round ===
Teams from Belfast, Dublin and the north west of Ireland were given byes in the first two rounds while several Army teams were selected to play in the first two rounds.

Team 1	Score	Team 2
8th Hussars	1–5	Royal Fusiliers
South Staffordshire Regiment	w/o	Hampshire Regiment
Cheshire Regiment	1–2	King's Own Rifles
Connaught Rangers	1–0	Oxfordshire Regiment
Inniskilling Fusiliers	3–1	Inniskilling Dragoons
Royal Irish Rifles	bye	

=== Second round ===
Team 1	Score	Team 2
King's Own Rifles	w/o	Royal Irish Rifles

=== Third round ===
Team 1	Score	Team 2
Bohemians	4–0	Bedford Regiment
Rifle Brigade	1–1	East Yorkshire Regiment
Freebooters	w/o	Trinity
Yorkshire Regiment	3–0	Connaught Rangers
Argyll & Sutherland Highlanders	3–0	Royal Fusiliers
14th Hussars	0–3	King's Own Scottish Borderers
North Staffordshire Regiment	2–4	Linfield
Glentoran	3–0	Distillery
Celtic	7–0	Cliftonville
North End	3–3	Derry Hibernians
St Columb's Court	w/o	Limavady
Inniskilling Fusiliers	5–2	St Columb's Hall Celtic
Hampshire Regiment	bye	
1st Battalion Inniskilling Fusiliers	bye	

==== Replays ====
Team 1	Score	Team 2
East Yorkshire Regiment	1–1	Rifle Brigade
Derry Hibernians	1–2	North End

==== Second replay ====
Team 1	Score	Team 2
East Yorkshire Regiment	2–1	Rifle Brigade

=== Fourth round ===
Team 1	Score	Team 2
Glentoran	4–0	North End
Linfield	w/o	Inniskilling Fusiliers
St Columb's Court	2–1 (a.e.t.)	1st Battalion Inniskilling Fusiliers
Freebooters	5–0	Yorkshire Regiment
Bohemians	3–1	Argyll & Sutherland Highlanders
King's Own Scottish Borderers	1–1	King's Own Rifles
East Yorkshire Regiment	1–3	Hampshire Regiment
Celtic	bye	

==== Replays ====
Team 1	Score	Team 2
King's Own Scottish Borderers	0–2	King's Own Rifles

=== Fifth round ===
Team 1	Score	Team 2
Linfield	7–0	Hampshire Regiment
Glentoran	8–0	King's Own Rifles
St Columb's Court	2–3	Celtic
Freebooters	2–4	Bohemians

=== Semi-finals ===
Team 1	Score	Team 2
Glentoran	2–2	Celtic
Linfield	4–2	Bohemians

==== Replay ====
Team 1	Score	Team 2
Glentoran	2–1^{1}	Celtic

- ^{1} A replay was ordered after a protest.

==== Second replay ====
Team 1	Score	Team 2
Celtic	2–1^{1}	Glentoran

- ^{1} Another replay was ordered after a protest.

==== Third replay ====
Team 1	Score	Team 2
Glentoran	2–0^{1}	Celtic

- ^{1} After a pitch incursion the match was suspended. Celtic refused to return and the tie was awarded to Glentoran.

=== Final ===
19 March 1898

Linfield	1–0^{2}	Glentoran
Peden	Report

Solitude, Belfast
Attendance: 7,000
- ^{2} The match ended early after Glentoran players refused to continue claiming that a Linfield player had punched a shot clear from the goal-line and no penalty had been awarded.
