= 1888–89 Irish Cup =

Tournament details
- Country: Ireland
- Date: 20 October 1888 – 16 March 1889
- Teams: 25

Final positions
- Champions: Distillery (4th win)
- Runners-up: YMCA

Tournament statistics
- Matches played: 21
- Goals scored: 140 (6.67 per match)

The 1888–89 Irish Cup was the 9th edition of the Irish Cup, the premier knock-out cup competition in Irish football.

Distillery won the tournament for the 4th time, defeating YMCA 5–4 in the final.

== Results ==
=== First round ===
Team 1	Score	Team 2
Dublin Association	0–4	Glentoran
Ulster	w/o	Distillery
Linfield Athletic	3–0	Cliftonville
YMCA	w/o	Mossley
Whiteabbey	w/o	Dublin University
Belfast Athletics	16–0	United Steamship
Oldpark	5–0	Clarence
Rock	2–2	Kilrea
St Columb's Court	3–0	Magherafelt
Limavady	7–0	Portrush
Hilden	13–0	Seapatrick
Banbridge	w/o	Milford
Montalto	bye	

==== Replay ====
Team 1	Score	Team 2
Kilrea	w/o	Rock

=== Second round ===
Team 1	Score	Team 2
Whiteabbey	1–6	Oldpark
Glentoran	2–0^{1}	Belfast Athletics
YMCA	8–0	Montalto
Distillery	3–1	Linfield Athletic
Kilrea	0–2	Limavady
Hilden	3–2	Milford
St Columb's Court	bye	

^{1} Belfast Athletics left the pitch due to the weather conditions. A replay was ordered.

==== Replay ====
Team 1	Score	Team 2
Belfast Athletics	0-2	Glentoran

=== Third round ===
Team 1	Score	Team 2
Distillery	10–0	Oldpark
Glentoran	8–0	Limavady
St Columb's Court	1–3	YMCA
Hilden	bye	

=== Semi-finals ===
Team 1	Score	Team 2
YMCA	3–1	Glentoran
Distillery	13–0	Hilden

=== Final ===
16 March 1889

Distillery	5–4	YMCA
R. Stewart; McClatchey; Stanfield	Report	Lemon; Millar; Small

Ulster Cricket Ground, Belfast
Attendance: 3,500
