= 1893–94 Irish Cup =

Tournament details
- Country: Ireland
- Date: 7 October 1893 – 7 April 1894
- Teams: 23

Final positions
- Champions: Distillery (5th win)
- Runners-up: Linfield

Tournament statistics
- Matches played: 18
- Goals scored: 102 (5.67 per match)

The 1893–94 Irish Cup was the 14th edition of the Irish Cup, the premier knock-out cup competition in Irish football.

Distillery won the tournament for the 5th time, defeating reigning champions Linfield 3–2 in the final replay, after a 2–2 draw in the first match.

== Results ==
Leinster Nomads, Bohemians, Dublin University and Montpelier were given byes into the third round, while Linfield, Cliftonville, Distillery, Glentoran, Ulster, Ligoniel, and Moyola Park were given byes into the fourth round.

=== First round ===
Team 1	Score	Team 2
Donacloney	6–4	Belview
Bright Stars	1–3	St Columb's Hall Celtic
St Columb's Court	6–1	Derry North End
Coleraine YMCA	w/o	Kilrea
Royal Inniskilling Fusiliers	w/o	Lifford
Limavady	bye	
Strabane	bye	

=== Second round ===
Team 1	Score	Team 2
St Columb's Court	6–1	St Columb's Hall Celtic
Limavady	w/o	Kilrea
Royal Inniskilling Fusiliers	w/o	Strabane
Donacloney	bye	

=== Third round ===
Team 1	Score	Team 2
St Columb's Court	4–1	Limavady
Bohemians	1–0	Leinster Nomads
Dublin University	w/o	Montpelier
Donacloney	bye	
Strabane	bye	

=== Fourth round ===
Team 1	Score	Team 2
Ulster	0–6	Distillery
Linfield	4–0	Glentoran
Donacloney	1–4	Cliftonville
Moyola Park	0–4	Ligoniel
Strabane	1–3	St Columb's Court
Bohemians	7–0	Montpelier

=== Fifth round ===
Team 1	Score	Team 2
Ligoniel	2–4	Cliftonville
Bohemians	^{1}4–3	St Columb's Court
Distillery	bye	
Linfield	bye	

- ^{1} A replay was ordered after a protest but Bohemians refused to play. St Columb's Court therefore progressed into the semi-finals.

=== Semi-finals ===
Team 1	Score	Team 2
Distillery	8–3	St Columb's Court
Linfield	3–2	Cliftonville

=== Final ===
17 March 1894

Distillery	2–2	Linfield
Stanfield	Report	Milne; McAllen

Solitude, Belfast
Attendance: 5,500

==== Replay ====
18 April 1894

Distillery	3–2	Linfield
Emerson; Stanfield	Report	Jordan; McErlean

Solitude, Belfast
