= 1889 in association football =

The following are the association football events of the year 1889 throughout the world.

== Events ==
- The Danish Football Association is founded.

=== Clubs founded ===
==== America ====
Argentina

Rosario Central

==== Asia ====
(British Raj) India

Mohun Bagan

==== Europe ====
England

Bath City
Brentford
Crook Town
Middlesbrough Ironopolis
Sheffield United
Torquay United
Wimbledon
Woking

Northern Ireland

Glenavon
Larne

Spain

Recreativo Huelva

== Winners Club National Championships ==
Nation	Tournament	Winner	Runner-up	Title
England	Football League	Preston North End	Aston Villa	1st
Netherlands	Football League Championship	RC & FC Concordia	Koninkiljke	1st

== Winners Club National Cup ==
=== Asia ===
Nation	Tournament	Winner	Runner-up	Venue	Title
India	Durand Cup	Highland Light Infantry	Shrimla Rifles	Annadale	1st

=== Europe ===
Nation	Tournament	Winner	Score	Runner-up	Venue	Title	Previous title won
England	FA Cup	Preston North End	3-0	Wolverhampton Wanderers	Kennington Oval	1st	None
Ireland	Irish Cup	Lisburn Distillery	5-4	YMCA	Ulster Cricket Ground	4th	1886
Scotland	Scottish Cup	Third Lanark	2-1 (replay after 3-0 Third Lanark win was voided)	Celtic	Cathkin Park	1st	None
Wales	Welsh Cup	Bangor	2-1	Northwich Victoria	Racecourse Ground	1st	None

== International tournaments ==
=== Europe ===
- (United Kingdom) British Home Championship

Winners: Scotland
Runners-Up: England

== Births ==
- 25 May – Jan van Dort (d. 1967), Netherlands international forward in five matches (1920).
- 25 June – Joe Smith (d. 1971), England international forward in five matches (1913–1920).

=== Undated ===
- Patrick Dougan, Scottish professional footballer, 1910s
