= James Wilton =

Irish footballer (1868–1946)

James McElmunn Wilton
Personal information
- Full name: James McElmunn Wilton
- Date of birth: 21 November 1868
- Place of birth: Derry, Ireland
- Date of death: 8 February 1946 (aged 77)
- Place of death: Derry
- Position: Forward

Senior career*
Years	Team	Apps	(Gls)
1886–1989, 1890–1992	St Columb's Court		
1889–1990	Cliftonville		
1892–1993	Derry Olympic		
1893–1994	North End		

International career
1888–1993	Ireland	7	(2)
- * Club domestic league appearances and goals

Captain Sir James McElmunn Wilton MC (21 November 1868 – 8 February 1946) was an Irish international footballer and administrator, who was also Mayor of Londonderry from 1935 to 1939.

== Early life ==
Wilton was the son of James Caldwell Wilton, a coachbuilder, and Sarah McElmunn, and was educated at the Londonderry Academical Institution, which later became Foyle College. After acting as a legal clerk for some years at the office of Mr P. Maxwell, he trained to become a solicitor, but his qualifications were interrupted by the First World War.

== Sporting career ==
"Jemmy" Wilton was a centre-forward for the St Columb's Court football club, his first recorded match for the club taking place in November 1886. He spent one season playing for Cliftonville, playing for the Reds in the 1889–90 Irish Cup final.

His greatest honour as a club player came in the County Londonderry F.A. Cup on his return to the Saints, as he was twice on the winning side in the final, in 1890–91 and 1891–92; in the latter year, both of his brothers were on the scoresheet as St Columb's Court beat Limavady 4–1.

When the city of Derry was invited to send a side to the Irish League in 1892, Wilton took on the task of choosing players for a club, Derry Olympic, chiefly from players of the Saints and Limavady. Wilton himself was a regular player, and even scored the club's first goal; but, with the club handicapped with extra travel expenses to Belfast, the experiment was not a success.

Wilton also earned seven international caps for Ireland, six of them coming when he was playing for the Saints. His last appearance, against Wales in 1893, saw him take the captain's role and score a late winner, for his only victory in Irish colours.

== IFA role ==
Wilton became president of the Irish Football Association in 1914, a role he held for over 30 years. He was part of the delegation which sought to avoid a split within the Irish FA after Home Rule in 1921. He was considered one of the conciliatory members of the Irish FA, who repeatedly called for a single authority over Irish football to keep politics separate from sport, and granted permission for clubs affiliated to the Football Association of Ireland to play on facilities of clubs loyal to the Irish FA; his proposal that meetings be split equally between Belfast and Dublin, with more international matches played in the Irish Free State, was rejected by the FA of Ireland. Even after his arguments failed, he pressed for the admission of Derry City to the Northern Irish League in 1929.

== Military career ==
On the outbreak of the First World War, in August 1914, Wilton volunteered for the 10th (Service) Battalion of the Royal Inniskilling Fusiliers. He was wounded at the Battle of the Somme in 1916 and while a temporary captain was awarded the Military Cross (MC), the citation for which appeared in The London Gazette in November 1916 and reads as follows:

For conspicuous gallantry in action. He led his company with great dash and skill, rallying and encouraging the men by his fine example, in spite of heavy fire and severe casualties. Finally, he was severely wounded whilst studying his map near the enemy third line, and rallying his company for further advance.

Post-war, he became chairman of the Ulster War Pensions' Advisory Committee.

== Political career ==
Wilton was secretary of the Derry division of the Ulster Volunteer Force before the war. He was elected as an Ulster Unionist to the Derry Corporation in 1923, and became Lord Mayor in 1935. As mayor, he was an ex officio member of the Senate of Northern Ireland from 1935 to 1939.

He received a knighthood from King George VI in July 1937 on the king's visit to Belfast. Wilton's last official act was attending a luncheon of the Ulster Unionist Council on 8 February 1946, and he died suddenly that evening.

== Legacy ==
Wilton Park in Limavady is named in his honour. Although a "staunch Unionist", he had "the esteem of all sections of the community in his native city".
