= 1896–97 Irish Cup =

Tournament details
- Country: Ireland
- Date: 31 October 1896 – 20 March 1897
- Teams: 16

Final positions
- Champions: Cliftonville (3rd win)
- Runners-up: Sherwood Foresters

Tournament statistics
- Matches played: 14
- Goals scored: 72 (5.14 per match)

The 1896–97 Irish Cup was the 17th edition of the Irish Cup, the premier knock-out cup competition in Irish football.

Cliftonville won the tournament for the 3rd time, defeating Sherwood Foresters (a British Army team) 3–1 in the final.

== Results ==
- Belfast and Dublin clubs were given a bye until the second round.

=== First round ===
Team 1	Score	Team 2
St Columb's Court	0–5	Bright Stars
St Columb's Hall Celtic	8–0	Limavady
Royal Inniskilling Fusiliers	w/o	Strabane
Derry North End	bye	

=== Second round ===
Team 1	Score	Team 2
Bright Stars	0–4	St Columb's Hall Celtic
North End	w/o	Royal Inniskilling Fusiliers
Glentoran	0–4	Distillery
Linfield	5–3	North Staffordshire Regiment
Cliftonville	7–1	Celtic
Sherwood Foresters	8–0	Hibernians
Bohemians	bye	

=== Third round ===
Team 1	Score	Team 2
North End	2–2	St Columb's Hall Celtic
Cliftonville	2–1	Linfield
Bohemians	0–1	Sherwood Foresters
Distillery	bye	

==== Replay ====
Team 1	Score	Team 2
St Columb's Hall Celtic	4–3	North End

=== Semi-finals ===
Team 1	Score	Team 2
Cliftonville	2–1	Distillery
Sherwood Foresters	3–2	St Columb's Hall Celtic

=== Final ===
20 March 1897

Cliftonville	3–1	Sherwood Foresters
James Campbell; Martin; Pyper	Report	Bedford

Grosvenor Park, Belfast
Attendance: 5,000
