= Samuel Johnston (footballer) =

Irish association footballer (1866–1910)

Personal information
- Date of birth: 18 September 1866
- Place of birth: Belfast, Ireland
- Date of death: 25 April 1910 (aged 43)
- Place of death: Belfast, Ireland
- Position: Centre forward

Senior career*
Years	Team	Apps	(Gls)
1881–1888	Distillery		

International career
1882–1886	Ireland	5	(2)
- * Club domestic league appearances and goals

Samuel James Johnston (18 September 1866 – 25 April 1910) was an Irish footballer who played as a centre forward for Ireland and Distillery between 1881 and 1888.

== Club career ==
Johnston was signed by Distillery as an amateur footballer in late 1881, aged 15. A regular goalscorer for Distillery over seven seasons, Johnston played a pivotal role in the club's three back-to-back Irish Cups between 1884 and 1886, scoring once in the 1884 final to help Distillery to a 5–0 win over Wellington Park on 19 April, aged 17, and twice in the 1885 final to help his side to a 3–0 win over Limavady on 21 March, aged 18. In total, he made 121 appearances and scored 36 goals including in friendly matches for Distillery.

Johnston scored his first hat-trick in a 4–0 win over Wellington Park in an Irish Cup match on 24 February 1883, and in doing so at the age of 16 years and 160 days, he remains one of the youngest players to score a professional hat-trick in an official senior match.

Johnston played his last match for Distillery in a friendly on 29 September 1888. There was no warning of him leaving the club and since an Sam Johnston began playing centre-forward for Linfield in the following week (6 October 1888), it was assumed he had moved clubs. However, this was not the case since on 5 January 1889, he was reported performing as an linesman at a Distillery match while Sam Johnston of Linfield was scoring 4 goals against Oldpark at Solitude in a Belfast Charity Cup match, thus conclusively proving that they were two separate persons. A few years later, Johnston appears to have broken all ties with football.

== International career ==
Johnston made his international debut for Ireland against England on 18 February 1882, at the age of 15 years and 154 days, becoming the youngest footballer to represent Ireland - a record which stands to this day. A blacksmith by trade, Johnston's well-built appearance meant that when he stepped into the field for his international debut, his age was not even commented on as seemingly nobody realized he was so young. It has only been confirmed in recent years that he was younger than Norman Whiteside, the long-thought youngest (Northern) Ireland international, by a margin of almost two years. Seven days later, on 25 February, Johnston made his second Irish appearance, scoring Ireland's first-ever international goal, an equalizer against Wales in an eventual 7–1 loss, thus becoming the youngest goalscorer in international European history, a record which also stands to this day.

Johnston earned three more caps for Ireland, one in the inaugural 1883–84 British Home Championship and the other two in the 1885–86 edition, scoring once in a 2–7 loss to Scotland on 20 March 1886, aged 19.

== Honours ==
Distillery

- Irish Cup: 1883–84, 1884–85, 1885–86
- Charity Cup: Runner-Up in 1883–84

== See also ==
- List of footballers who achieved hat-trick records
