= 1886 in association football =

The following are the association football events of the year 1886 throughout the world.

== Events ==
- December 11 - Dial Square FC (later Arsenal) beat Eastern Wanderers 6-0, their first match.
- December 25 - After a meeting in the Royal Oak pub, Woolwich, Dial Square rename themselves Royal Arsenal

=== England ===
- Dial Square F.C. (later to become Arsenal)
- Bishop Auckland F.C. as Auckland Town FC
- Glossop North End A.F.C.
- Haverhill Rovers F.C.
- Kidderminster Harriers F.C.
- Leytonstone F.C.
- Argyle Football Club, later Plymouth Argyle F.C.
- Shrewsbury Town F.C.
- Upton Park F.C.
- Worthing F.C.

=== Scotland ===
- Clachnacuddin F.C.
- Motherwell FC

=== Northern Ireland ===
- Linfield F.C.

=== Switzerland ===
- Grasshopper Club Zürich (1 September)

=== Hong Kong ===
- Hong Kong FC

== Domestic cups ==
Nation	Tournament	Winner	Score	Runner-up	Venue	Title	Previous title won
England	1885–86 FA Cup	Blackburn Rovers	2-0 (replay following 0-0 draw)	West Bromwich Albion	Racecourse Ground	3rd	1885
Ireland	1885–86 Irish Cup	Distillery	1-0	Limavady	Ulster Cricket Ground	3rd	1885
Scotland	1885–86 Scottish Cup	Queen's Park	3-1	Renton	Cathkin Park	8th	1884
Wales	1885–86 Welsh Cup	Druids	4-0	Newtown	Racecourse Ground	5th	1885

== International tournaments ==
- 1885–86 British Home Championship (February 27 – April 10, 1886)

Pos	Team	Pld	W	D	L	GF	GA	GD	Pts
1	Scotland (C)	3	2	1	0	12	4	+8	5
2	England (C)	3	2	1	0	10	3	+7	5
3	Wales	3	1	0	2	7	7	0	2
4	Ireland	3	0	0	3	3	18	−15	0

Rules for classification: 1) Points. The points system worked as follows: 2 points for a win and 1 point for a draw.
(C) Joint champions

== Births ==
- 1 January – Harold Halse (d. 1949), England international forward in one match (1909), scoring two goals; the first player to appear in three FA Cup finals for three different clubs.
- 16 February – Andy Ducat (d. 1942), England international half-back in six matches (1910–1920).
- 1 July – Bill Worrall (d. -), English professional footballer
- 25 December – Jock Simpson (d. 1959), England international forward in eight matches (1911–1914).
