= North End Athletic F.C. =

Former Association Football club in Northern Ireland

North End Athletic
- Full name: North End Athletic Football Club
- Nickname(s): the North Enders
- Founded: 1887
- Dissolved: 1891
- Ground: North End Ground
- Secretary: Stewart M'Keown
Home colours

North End Athletic Football Club, sometimes referred to as North End Athletics, was an association football club from west Belfast.

== History ==
The club emerged from an athletics club, formerly called the Ravens, and played its first football match against Clarence at the latter's Chichester Park in October 1887, losing 2–0. It had entered the 1887–88 Irish Cup but scratched to Linfield.

North End entered the FA Cup in 1889–90, despite not yet played a tie in its local tournament. In the national, North End received a bye in the first qualifying round, and was drawn to face Linfield. The two clubs met at Ulsterville in the first round of the 1889–90 Irish Cup, and, as Linfield won 10–0, the North Enders withdrew from the FA Cup.

The club was represented at the May 1890 Irish Football Association general meeting, but ceased operations before the 1890–91 season, and at least four of its players joined Cliftonville. It still had a balance of £2 12/6 in hand on its final dissolution in February 1891, which the club handed over to a charity for sailors.

== Colours ==
The club wore black and white.

== Ground ==
The club's ground was on the junction of the Antrim Road and Crumlin Road, and was taken over by the Y.M.C.A. football club on North End's dissolution.
