= 1895–96 Irish Cup =

Tournament details
- Country: Ireland
- Date: 2 November 1895 – 14 March 1896
- Teams: 20

Final positions
- Champions: Distillery (6th win)
- Runners-up: Glentoran

Tournament statistics
- Matches played: 20
- Goals scored: 92 (4.6 per match)

The 1895–96 Irish Cup was the 16th edition of the Irish Cup, the premier knock-out cup competition in Irish football.

Distillery won the tournament for the 6th time, defeating Glentoran 3–1 in the final.

== Results ==
Dublin University, Milltown, Distillery, Celtic, Linfield, Moyola Park, Glentoran and Cliftonville given byes into the second round.

=== First round ===
Team 1	Score	Team 2
Strabane	1–4	Royal Inniskilling Fusiliers
St Columb's Hall Celtic	1–3	2nd Battalion, Royal West Kent
St Columb's Court	3–1	Bright Stars
North End	w/o	Limavady
2nd Battalion, Scots Guards	5–2	Sherwood Foresters
Hibernians	1–6	Bohemians

=== Second round ===
Team 1	Score	Team 2
Dublin University	2–5	Bohemians
Milltown	0–8	Distillery
Linfield	1-0	Celtic
Moyola Park	1–7	Glentoran
2nd Battalion, Royal West Kent	w/o	North End
St Columb's Court	2–1	Royal Inniskilling Fusiliers
Cliftonville	bye	
2nd Battalion, Scots Guards	bye	

=== Third round ===
Team 1	Score	Team 2
Cliftonville	1–0	Linfield
North End	0–0	St Columb's Court
Distillery	3–1	Bohemians
2nd Battalion, Scots Guards	2–2	Glentoran

==== Replays ====
Team 1	Score	Team 2
St Columb's Court	1–1	North End
Glentoran	3–0	2nd Battalion, Scots Guards

==== Second replay ====
Team 1	Score	Team 2
North End	4–1	St Columb's Court

=== Semi-finals ===
Team 1	Score	Team 2
Distillery	4–1	Cliftonville
Glentoran	8–2	North End

=== Final ===
14 March 1896

Distillery	3–1	Glentoran
Riley; Baird; Campbell	Report	Carmichael

Solitude, Belfast
Attendance: 6,000
