= 1899–1900 Irish Cup =

Tournament details
- Country: Ireland
- Date: 28 October 1899 – 24 March 1900
- Teams: 16

Final positions
- Champions: Cliftonville (4th win)
- Runners-up: Bohemians

Tournament statistics
- Matches played: 12
- Goals scored: 46 (3.83 per match)

The 1899–1900 Irish Cup was the 20th edition of the Irish Cup, the premier knock-out cup competition in Irish football.

Cliftonville won the tournament for the 4th time, defeating Bohemians 2–1 in the final.

== Results ==
=== First round ===
Team 1	Score	Team 2
14th Hussars	w/o	Richmond Rovers
Bohemians	2–1	Freebooters
Cliftonville	w/o	Royal Scots
Distillery	2–1	Linfield
Dublin University	w/o	King's Own Scottish Borderers
Glentoran	0–1	Celtic
North End	1–4	Derry Celtic
St Columb's Court	2–1	Derry Hibernians

=== Quarter-finals ===
Team 1	Score	Team 2
Celtic	3–1	St Columb's Court
Cliftonville	5–1	Derry Celtic
Distillery	1–5	Bohemians
King's Own Scottish Borderers	1–1	Richmond Rovers

==== Replay ====
Team 1	Score	Team 2
King's Own Scottish Borderers	5–2	Richmond Rovers

=== Semi-finals ===
Team 1	Score	Team 2
Bohemians	2–1	Celtic
Cliftonville	w/o	King's Own Scottish Borderers

=== Final ===
24 March 1900

Cliftonville	2–1	Bohemians
Campbell; Martin	Report	Sheehan

Grosvenor Park, Belfast
Attendance: 5,500
