= 1885–86 Irish Cup =

Tournament details
- Country: Ireland
- Date: 21 November 1885 – 27 March 1886
- Teams: 34

Final positions
- Champions: Distillery (3rd win)
- Runners-up: Limavady

Tournament statistics
- Matches played: 33
- Goals scored: 137 (4.15 per match)

The 1885–86 Irish Cup was the 6th edition of the Irish Cup, the premier knock-out cup competition in Irish football.

Distillery won the tournament for the 3rd time and 3rd year in a row, defeating Limavady 1–0 in a repeat of the previous year's final.

== Results ==
=== First round ===
Team 1	Score	Team 2
Wellington Park	3–1	Ormeau
Ligoniel	6-2	Down Athletics
Oldpark	3–1^{1}	YMCA
Clifton Park	3–1	Clarence
Montalto	2–9	Glentoran
Dublin Association	w/o	Belfast Athletics
Ulster	2–1	Cliftonville
Distillery	12–0	Chichester Park
North Down	3–0	Civil Service
Carrickfergus	1-4	Mossley
Mountcollyer	4-0	Glenalina
Dublin University	2–0	Albert
Moyola Park	1–1	Magherafelt
Kilrea	3–0	Movanagher
Rosemount	0-5	Limavady
Hertford	2–2	Banbridge
Hilden	bye	
Victoria (R.I.C.)	bye	

^{1}After a protest by YMCA that the match did not kick off at the correct time, a replay was ordered.

==== Replays ====
Team 1	Score	Team 2
YMCA	1–0	Oldpark
Magherafelt	w/o^{1}	Moyola Park
Banbridge	1–1^{2}	Hertford

^{1} After protesting against Moyola Park's rough play in the previous match, Magherafelt refused to play the replay.
^{2} After both teams drew again, they were moved into the second round.

=== Second round ===
Team 1	Score	Team 2
Hilden	1-4	Hertford
Limavady	w/o	Victoria (R.I.C.)
Kilrea	1–1	Moyola Park
YMCA	3–0	Mountcollyer
Dublin University	3–0	Mossley
Clifton Park	1–0	Wellington Park
Ligoniel	1–7	Glentoran
Dublin Association	1–5	Distillery
Ulster	6–1	North Down
Banbridge	bye	

==== Replay ====
Team 1	Score	Team 2
Moyola Park	4–1	Kilrea

=== Third round ===
Team 1	Score	Team 2
Distillery	2–0	Ulster
YMCA	3–2	Glentoran
Dublin University	7–0	Clifton Park
Hertford	0–1	Banbridge
Limavady	bye	
Moyola Park	bye	

=== Fourth round ===
Team 1	Score	Team 2
Dublin University	6–0	Banbridge
Limavady	6–0	Moyola Park
YMCA	bye	
Distillery	bye	

=== Semi-finals ===
Team 1	Score	Team 2
Distillery	4–0	Dublin University
Limavady	1–0	YMCA

=== Final ===
27 March 1886

Distillery	1–0	Limavady
J Johnston	Report

Ulster Cricket Ground, Belfast
Attendance: 1,000
