= Montpelier F.C. =

Former association football club

- Full name: Montpelier Football Club (Association)
- Founded: 1887
- Dissolved: 1895
- Ground: Island Bridge
- Secretaries: J. D'Arcy & Capt. G. Day
- Captains: T. Rice, George Freeman, J. Grundy
Home colours

Montpelier F.C. was an association football club based in Dublin, Ireland.

== History ==
The club was formed out of a cricket club in 1887, in order to keep players fit over winter, but could not play any matches against other clubs, given the lack of association football in Dublin; captain D'Arcy proposed a meeting of cricket clubs in October 1888 in order to persuade some of them to adopt the association game. The cricket club was named after Montpelier Hill in County Dublin.

Montpelier's first competitive football came in the first Leinster Senior Cup in 1892–93, losing to eventual winner Leinster Nomads in the semi-final; the next season, it entered the 1893–94 Irish Cup, and, in the southern Ireland section, walked over Dublin University, but lost heavily to Bohemians in the next round. Despite this setback, goalkeeper Rice was chosen to play for Leinster in the inter-provincial match with Ulster in December 1893.

On 23 April 1894, the Leinster Senior League was agreed, with Montpelier as one of the six founding clubs; Montpelier's Patrick McManus was the League's first secretary. However the competition seems not to have completed its first season, as Phoenix withdrew during the season, and not all fixtures were played; Bohemians was declared champion, Montpelier having lost all of its three matches; a 3–2 win over Britannia, the three Montpelier goals coming in the final 12 minutes, was annulled after a protest as to the state of the Montpelier pitch, and was one of the outstanding fixtures when the season came to a halt.

Montpelier's 1894–95 Irish Cup run was also unsuccessful, with a 3–0 defeat at Bohemians in the two clubs' first match in the competition that season, two late goals flattering the home side.

The club wound up after the 1894–95 season, but many of the members founded a new club in August 1895, called the Hibernian Football and Athletic Club.

== Colours ==
The club wore blue and white stripes.

== Ground ==
The club's ground was at Island Bridge, in Phoenix Park.
