= 1889–90 Belfast Charity Cup =

Tournament details
- Country: Ireland
- Date: 15 February 1889 – 26 April 1889
- Teams: 8

Final positions
- Champions: Black Watch (1st win)
- Runners-up: Gordon Highlanders

Tournament statistics
- Matches played: 8
- Goals scored: 44 (5.5 per match)

The 1889–90 Belfast Charity Cup was the 7th edition of the Belfast Charity Cup, a cup competition in Irish football.

Black Watch won the tournament for the 1st time, defeating Gordon Highlanders 5–2 in the final. The final is notable for being the only time in the tournament that two British Army sides contested the final.

== Results ==
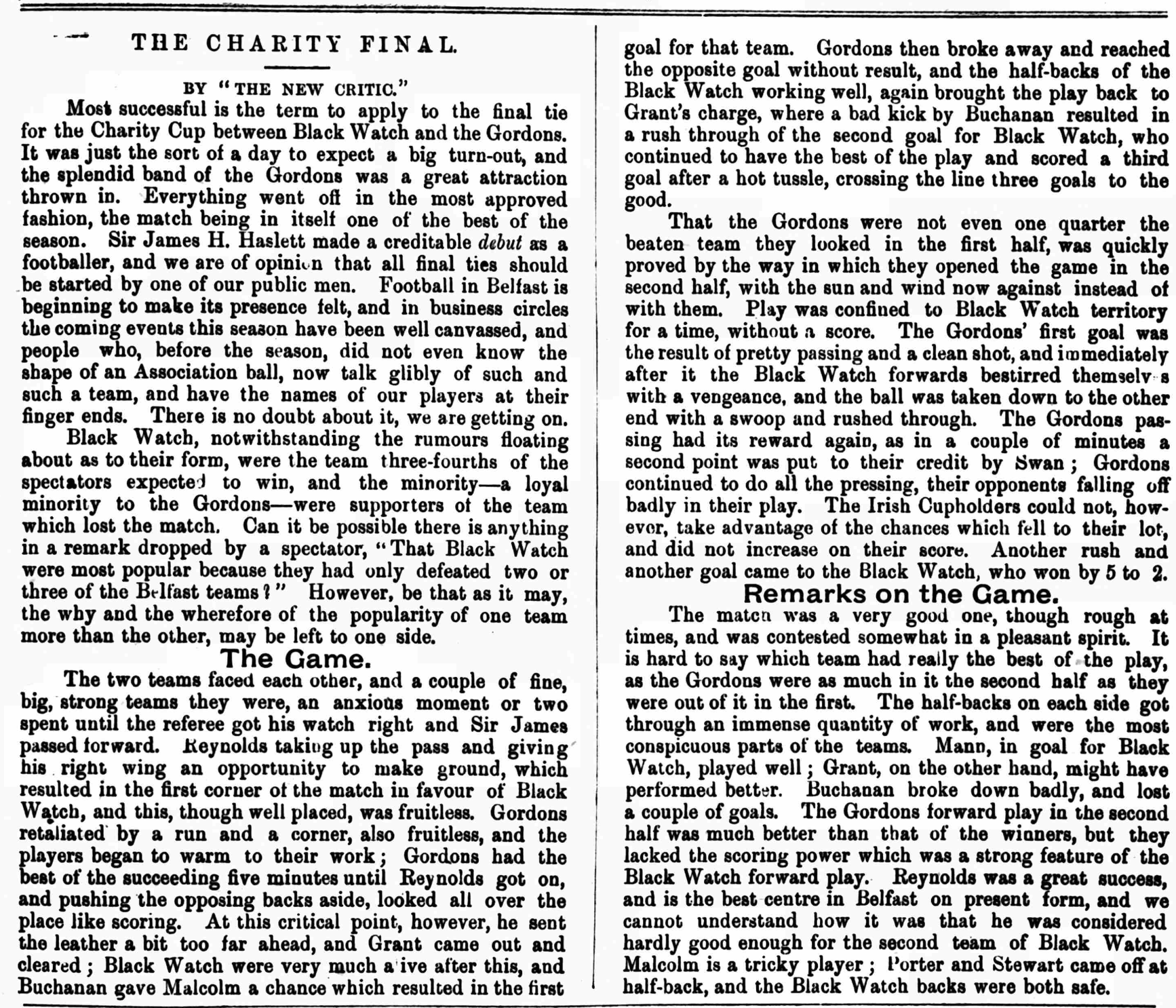
1889–90 Belfast Charity Cup Final, Black Watch 5–3 Gordon Highlanders, from Ulster Football and Cycling News, 2 May 1890.

=== Quarterfinals ===
Team 1	Score	Team 2
Cliftonville	2–2	Glentoran
Gordon Highlanders	2–1	Distillery
Linfield	3–3	Black Watch
Ulster	2–2	Clarence

==== Replays ====
Team 1	Score	Team 2
Cliftonville	3–4	Glentoran
Linfield	1–5	Black Watch
Ulster	6–1	Clarence

=== Semi-finals ===
Team 1	Score	Team 2
Black Watch	w/o	Ulster
Gordon Highlanders	w/o	Glentoran

=== Final ===
26 April 1890
15:30 GMT

Black Watch	5–2	Gordon Highlanders
Malcolm ? Thorn	Report	Hall; Christie

Ulster Cricket Ground, Belfast
Attendance: 3,000
Referee: Mr J. Watson
