= 1884–85 Irish Cup =

Tournament details
- Country: Ireland
- Date: 6 December 1884 – 21 March 1885
- Teams: 31

Final positions
- Champions: Distillery (2nd win)
- Runners-up: Limavady

Tournament statistics
- Matches played: 36
- Goals scored: 132 (3.67 per match)

The 1884–85 Irish Cup was the 5th edition of the Irish Cup, the premier knock-out cup competition in Irish football.

Distillery won the tournament for the 2nd time and 2nd year in a row, defeating Limavady 5–0 in the final.

== Results ==
=== First round ===
Team 1	Score	Team 2
YMCA	3–0	Clarence
Ulster	7–0	Civil Service
Cliftonville	7–0	Albert
Wellington Park	0–5	Distillery
Spencer	2-2	Ligoniel
Oldpark	10–0	Glenalina
Chichester Park	2–1	North Down
Ormeau	1–5	Glentoran
Down Athletics	w/o	Sydenham
Hertford	4–0	Banbridge
Limavady	1–0	Victoria (R.I.C.)
Strabane	2–0	Rosemount
Kilrea	0–1	Moyola Park
Dublin Association	1-1	Dublin University
Mossley	bye	
Magherafelt	bye	
Monaghan	bye	

==== Replays ====
Team 1	Score	Team 2
Ligoniel	2–9	Spencer
Dublin Association	2–0	Dublin University

=== Second round ===
Team 1	Score	Team 2
Moyola Park	1–0	Magherafelt
Strabane	1–5	Limavady
Monaghan	1–6	Distillery
Sydenham	0–0	Mossley
Glentoran	4–1	Spencer
Cliftonville	4–1	YMCA
Ulster	0–4	Oldpark
Hertford	2–1	Chichester Park
Dublin Association	bye	

==== Replay ====
Team 1	Score	Team 2
Mossley	0–0	Sydenham

Second Replay did not take place and both teams progressed to the next round

=== Third round ===
Team 1	Score	Team 2
Limavady	0-0	Moyola Park
Dublin Association	1–3	Oldpark
Cliftonville	7–0	Mossley
Glentoran	1–5	Distillery
Hertford	6–2	Sydenham

==== Replay ====
Team 1	Score	Team 2
Moyola Park	0–1	Limavady

=== Fourth round ===
Team 1	Score	Team 2
Oldpark	0-1	Distillery
Hertford	0–1	Limavady
Cliftonville	bye	

=== Semi-finals ===
Team 1	Score	Team 2
Limavady	2–1	Cliftonville
Distillery	bye	

=== Final ===
21 March 1885

Distillery	3–0	Limavady
Johnston; Rankine	Report

Ulster Cricket Ground, Belfast
Attendance: 2,000
