= Patrick Duggan =

Patrick Duggan, Dugan or Dougan may refer to:

- Patrick Duggan (bishop) (1813–1896), Irish Roman Catholic clergyman
- Patrick Duggan (actor) (1935–2022), Irish actor
- Patrick Gerald Duggan or Patrick Malahide (born 1945), British actor
- Patrick J. Duggan (1933–2020), U.S. federal judge
- Patrick Dougan (1889–?), Scottish professional footballer

== Fictional characters ==
- Pat Dugan, DC Comics Universe superhero
