= 1887 in association football =

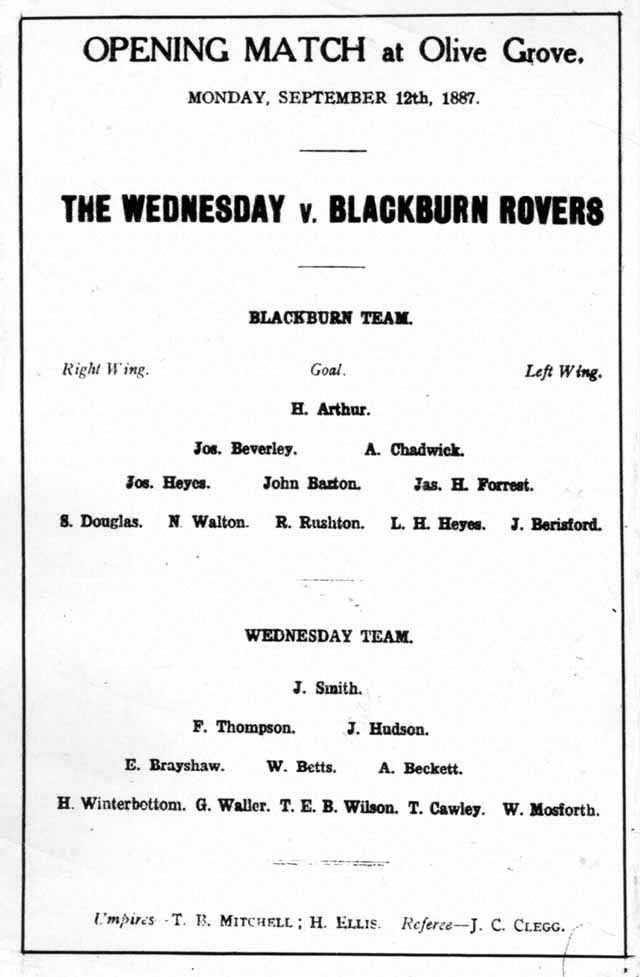
Programme for an 1887 game: The Wednesday v. Blackburn Rovers.

The following are the events of 1887 in association football.

== Events ==
=== Clubs founded in 1887 ===
Argentina

La Plata GFC

Denmark

Odense BK

Republic of Ireland

Athlone Town

England

Barnsley
Blackpool
Cheltenham Town F.C.
Lowesoft Town
Weston-super-Mare
Witton Albion
Wycombe Wanderers

Germany

Hamburger SV

Portugal

Academica

Sweden

Örgryte IS

== Domestic cups ==
Nation	Tournament	Winner	Score	Runner-up	Venue	Title
England	1886–87 FA Cup	Aston Villa	2-0	West Bromwich Albion	Kennington Oval	1st
Ireland	1886–87 Irish Cup	Ulster	3-1	Cliftonville	Broadway Ground	1st
Scotland	1886–87 Scottish Cup	Hibernian	2-1	Dumbarton	Cathkin Park	1st
Wales	1886–87 Welsh Cup	Chirk AAA	2-1	Davenham	Nantwich Road	1st

== International tournaments ==
- 1887 British Home Championship (February 5 – March 19, 1887)

Pos	Team	Pld	W	D	L	GF	GA	GD	Pts
1	Scotland (C)	3	3	0	0	9	3	+6	6
2	England	3	2	0	1	13	3	+10	4
3	Ireland	3	1	0	2	5	12	−7	2
4	Wales	3	0	0	3	1	10	−9	0

Rules for classification: 1) Points. The points system worked as follows: 2 points for a win and 1 point for a draw.
(C) Champions
- 1887 Football World Championship (April 9, 1887)
9 April 1887

(England) Preston North End	1-2	Hibernian (Scotland)

Hibernian Park, Edinburgh

== Births ==
- 30 April – Harold Fleming (d. 1955), England international forward in eleven matches (1909–1914), scoring nine goals.
- 7 November – Guus van Hecking Colenbrander (d. 1945), Netherlands international (1908).
