= Banbridge F.C. =

- Full name: Banbridge Football Club
- Nickname(s): the Academicals
- Founded: 1879
- Dissolved: 1888
- Ground: B.C.A.C. Ground
Home colours

Banbridge Football Club is a former Irish football club, from the town of Banbridge, and was one of the first four clubs to be formed in Ireland.

== History ==
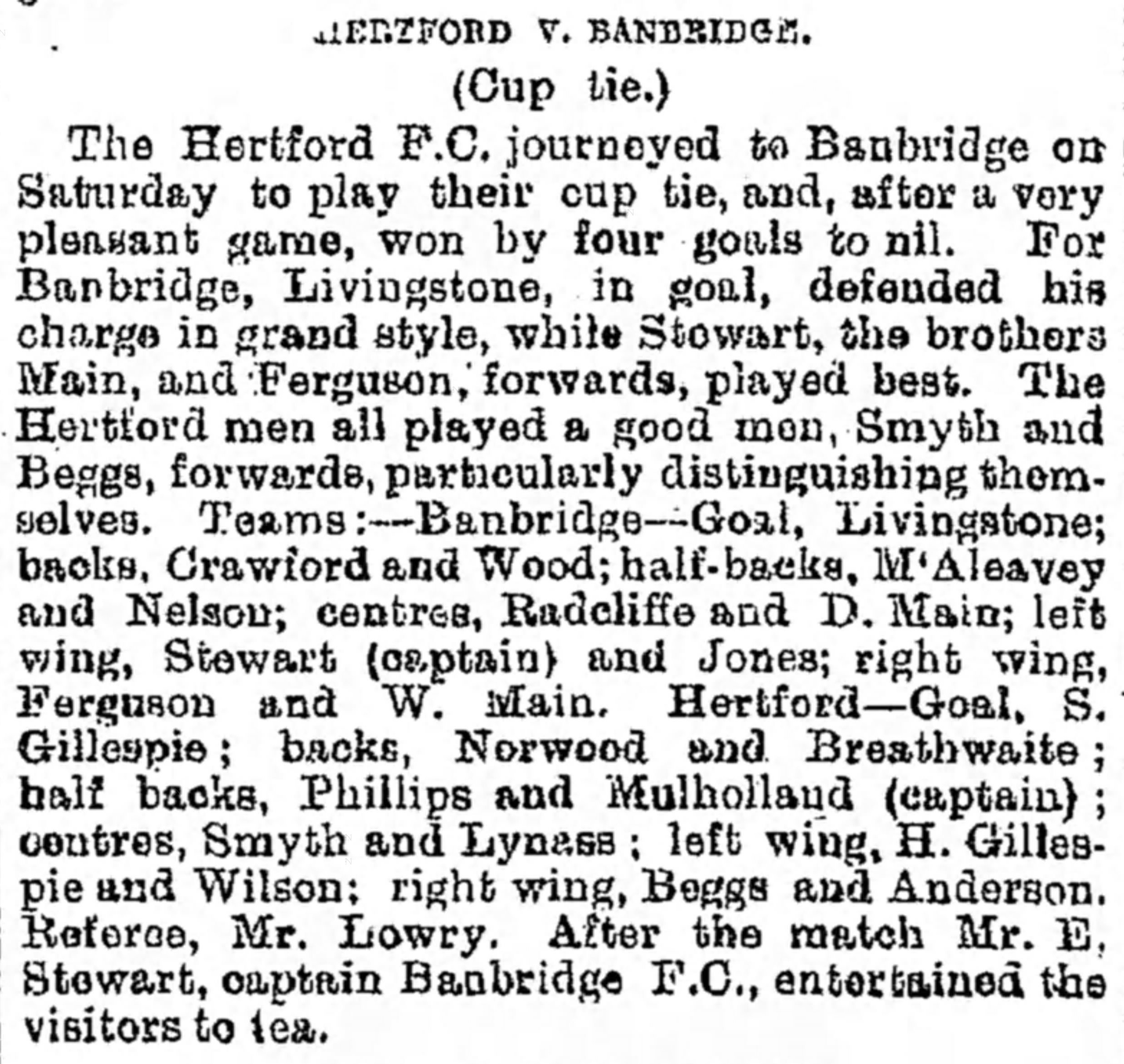
1884–85 Irish Cup 1st round, Banbridge 0–4 Hertford, Belfast News Letter, 8 December 1884

The club was formed under the auspices of the Banbridge Academy for the benefit of current and former pupils, and its official name was originally Banbridge Academy F.C., but even in its first reports the club was simply referred to as Banbridge. In its first season, it played four matches; two against Cliftonville and two against Knock, losing three times, but earning a draw in its home fixture with Knock. For its first match, against Cliftonville on 22 November 1879, the club had the assistance of a Queen's Park player - A. M. Buchanan - in goal.

The Academicals first entered the Irish Cup in 1881–82, the competition's second iteration, and goals from Main, Stewart, and Ferguson gave the side a 3–0 win at Ligoniel. The club lost 2–1 at Castlederg in the quarter-final, with all three goals having a touch of fortune about them; Castlederg took the lead when the Academicals' goalkeeper H. T. Roberts punched a cross into his own goal, full-back W. A. Smyth equalized with a long shot which McElhinney in the home goal thought was going wide and made no effort to save, and Castlederg's winner was thanks to a vicious deflection off half-back Beckett.

Banbridge did not enter the competition again until 1884–85. Its only other win in the competition came in 1885–86, drawing twice with Hertford in the first round, which, under the rules of the competition at the time, meant both sides were put into the second; after Banbridge drew a bye, it was once more drawn to play Hertford in the third round, and won 1–0 at Hertford's Thornhill ground in the clubs' third tie. This put the club into the last 6 of the competition, but at that stage it lost 6–0 at Dublin University, amid some bitterness about the late arrival of the university side, the Banbridge players not being able to leave their clothes in a safe place, and a referee and umpire who "did not seem to know what a "hand ball" was when a Banbridge man called it, and as regards "off side", they knew nothing about it at all".

The club had always suffered from relative geographical isolation, and scarcely played outside Cup competitions; it was also affected by the formation of a second club, Millmount, which diluted the available talent, and promptly beat Banbridge in its first competitive match, in the 1886–87 Irish Cup; the two clubs merged in October 1887, officially under the Millmount name, but it was still often referred to as Banbridge.

Its final entry in 1888–89 saw the club drawn at home to Milford, but, because of "the want of suitable grounds, and not being able to raise a team that would have a ghost of a chance in the competition", the club withdrew, re-forming itself as a Junior club under the name West Down.

== Colours ==
The club wore dark blue, with a white star, possibly a reference to the ballad Star of the County Down, set near the village.

== Ground ==
The club played at the Banbridge Cricket and Athletic Ground.

== Notable players ==
- Bob Hunter, international goalkeeper, played for the club in 1885–86
- Jack Gillespie, centre-forward, the club's final secretary, who earned an international cap for Ireland when playing with West Down in April 1889
