= Gordon Highlanders F.C. =

Military association football club

Gordon Highlanders
- Full name: Gordon Highlanders Football Club
- Founded: 1884
- Dissolved: 1939
- Ground: varied according to stationing
Home colours

Gordon Highlanders F.C. was a British association football club. It was the footballing side of the Gordon Highlanders regiment in the British Army.

== History ==
The first reference to a Gordon Highlanders football club is from the 1884–85 season, when the regiment was based in Devon. Usually based in Aberdeen, the club was a regular entrant to Highland competitions in the amateur era of football. It entered the Aberdeenshire Cup in 1889–90 and 1890–91 and the short-lived Banffshire Cup in 1890–91.

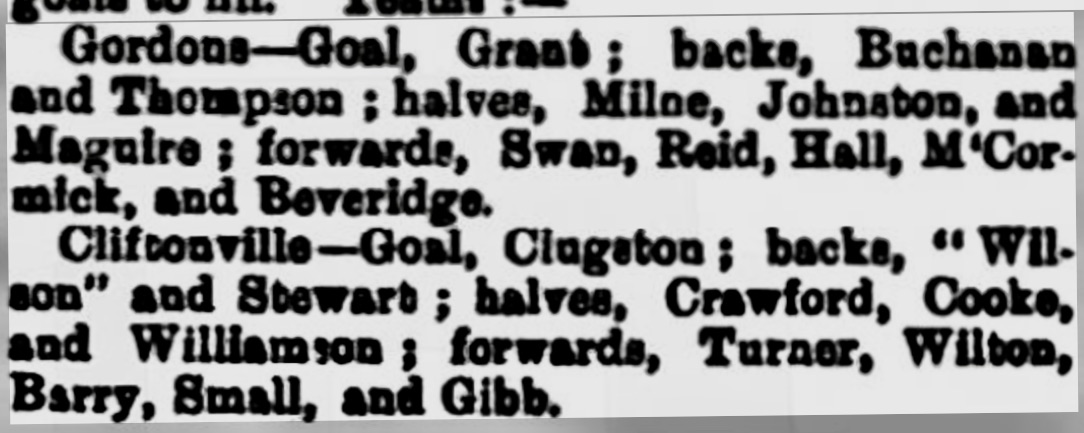
Irish Cup Final 1889–90, Gordon Highlanders v Cliftonville sides, Northern Whig, 14 April 1890

The club's finest achievements came when the battalion was stationed in Belfast in 1889–90. The Gordons won the Irish Cup, surprising Linfield in the semi-final at Ulsterville, and beating Cliftonville in the final after a replay. The first match (at Ballynafeigh) attracted a record attendance for Ireland, and the Gordons took a two-goal half-time lead, but were pegged back to 2–2 by the call of time. The replay, played in front of 3,000 at Ulsterville, saw the regiment dominate, a goal from Beveridge in the first half and two from Swan - the last right on the whistle - in the second securing the Cup.

The club also reached the final of the 1889–90 Belfast Charity Cup, losing 5–3 to fellow army side the Black Watch. The regiment was re-drafted to Ceylon in 1890; the football side was allowed to stay behind with another battalion, and the regiment formed another side to play football in Asia.

Stationed in Glasgow from 1894, the club entered the Scottish Cup in 1894–95, and the Scottish Qualifying Cup in 1895–96 and 1896–97. It did not win a tie, but did draw twice with first round opponents. 3–3 with Northern in 1894–95 (the replay having to take place at Northern's ground in Springburn), and 2–2 with Linthouse the following season; the Highlanders started the replay in a rush, and took an early 2 goal lead, before the superior stamina of professional players saw the Linties win 7–3. The Gordons also entered the Glasgow Cup in 1894–95 and 1895–96, but lost both ties the club played.

The regiment was redeployed to Aldershot after being drawn against Burnbank Swifts in the 1896–97 Qualifying Cup, so was forced to scratch from the competition, and it did not renew its Scottish Football Association membership. It was replaced at the barracks by the 1st Argyll and Sutherland Highlanders.

The Gordons' last major success was via the 2nd Battalion winning the Army Cup in 1897–98, beating the Cup holders Royal Artillery in the final at Aldershot; the strength of support for the army game demonstrated by a crowd of 25,000 attending, including the Duke of Connaught, who presented the trophy and medals. The club also won the Aldershot League, ahead of the K.O.S.B. in second place. In 1898 the regiment was sent to India, where the club's popular secretary, Lt J. H. Outhwaite, died of an attack of dysentery.

The regiment was sent to South Africa in 1899, and suffered an alarming incident when a shell burst on its football pitch during a match; none of the players was injured, and, having filled up the crater, the match duly continued. While based in Egypt in 1912–13, the Highlanders carried off the Large Unit Shield for Egypt and the Sudan, beating the 2nd Devonshire Regiment 3–2 in the final.

After being stationed in India in the 1920s, the regiment returned to Aberdeen, and the Gordons entered the Scottish Junior Cup a number of times in the 1920s and 1930s. It reached the third round in 1934–35, and apparently beat Aberdeen East End at that stage, but the win was thrown out after a protest and the Gordons lost the replay. The club was still active on the eve of the Second World War, but there is no record of the club at any level outside the Army after 1939.

== Colours ==
The club wore blue, yellow, and green quartered shirts, and black knickers.

== Grounds ==
The club is known to have played in the following areas:

- 1884–85: Devon
- 1888–89: Aberdeen
- 1889–90: Carrickfergus
- 1890–91: Curragh Camp
- 1891–92: Annandale, Sri Lanka
- 1894–96: Maryhill Barracks
- 1896–98: Aldershot
- 1898–99: Dagshai, India
- 1899–1900: Osfontein, Cape Province, South Africa
- 1912–13: Cairo
- 1914–15: Aberdeen, with matches taking place at Pittodrie
- 1927–28: Trimulgherry
- 1928–39: Aberdeen
