= 1903–04 Irish League =

Irish League
- Season: 1903–04
- Dates: 29 August 1903 – 25 April 1904
- Champions: Linfield; 7th Irish title
- Matches played: 56
- Goals scored: 200 (3.57 per match)
- Biggest home win: Bohemians 8–0 KOSB
- Biggest away win: Cliftonville 1–8 Linfield; KOSB 0–7 Linfield
- Highest scoring: Cliftonville 1–8 Linfield

The 1903–04 Irish League was the 14th edition of the Irish League, the highest level of league competition in Irish football.

The league comprised eight teams, and Linfield won the championship for the 7th time.

== Season summary ==
Ulster, who had competed the previous season, did not compete this season and would not appear again in the Irish League. Their place was taken by a British Army, the King's Own Scottish Borderers. Like previous army teams, KOSB did not have a home ground and all matches were played at the grounds of their opponents.

== Teams and locations ==
Location of teams in the 1903–04 Irish League
Location of Belfast teams in the 1903–04 Irish League

Team	Town	Home Ground
Belfast Celtic	Belfast	Celtic Park
Bohemians	Dublin	Dalymount Park
Cliftonville	Belfast	Solitude
Derry Celtic	Derry	Brandywell
Distillery	Belfast	Grosvenor Park
Glentoran	Belfast	The Oval
King's Own Scottish Borderers	No home ground	
Linfield	Belfast	Balmoral

== League standings ==
Pos	Team	Pld	W	D	L	GF	GA	GR	Pts	Result
1	Linfield (C)	14	12	2	0	47	9	5.222	26	Champions
2	Distillery	14	8	4	2	35	13	2.692	20	
3	Glentoran	14	7	6	1	20	10	2.000	20	
4	Belfast Celtic	14	5	2	7	24	17	1.412	12	
5	Cliftonville	14	5	2	7	22	31	0.710	12	
6	Bohemians	14	4	3	7	24	33	0.727	11	
7	Derry Celtic	14	3	2	9	17	26	0.654	8	
8	King's Own Scottish Borderers	14	1	1	12	11	61	0.180	3	Withdrew

Source: rsssf.com
(C) Champions

== Results ==
Home \ Away	BCE	BOH	CLI	DCE	DIS	GLT	KOS	LIN
Belfast Celtic		6–0	3–0	1–0	1–2	1–0	5–1	0–2
Bohemians	2–2		3–1	2–1	0–2	0–0	8–0	2–4
Cliftonville	2–1	1–2		1–0	3–3	1–1	5–1	1–8
Derry Celtic	0–0	4–1	0–2		1–1	2–3	2–0	2–3
Distillery	2–1	5–1	3–1	2–1		1–1	7–0	0–1
Glentoran	2–1	2–0	4–2	1–0	0–0		3–0	1–1
KOSB	3–2	2–2	1–2	2–3	0–6	1–2		0–7
Linfield	1–0	3–1	1–0	7–1	2–1	0–0	7–0	

Source: Irish League Archive
Legend: Blue = home team win; Yellow = draw; Red = away team win.
