= Tritonville F.C. =

- Full name: Tritonville Football Club
- Nickname(s): the Red and Blues
- Founded: 1893
- Ground: Sandymount; Dublin
- League: Irish League
Home colours

Tritonville Football Club was an association football club from Dublin, Ireland.

== History ==
The club was formed in 1893, but generally played low-key matches, resulting in the club losing players to neighbours Shelbourne; it was only able to continue after taking over a neighbouring club (Triton Rovers) as its reserve side. The club had one senior season in the late 1890s under the name Hibernians, but that only lasted one year, and the reserve side basically continued the club at a junior level.

The club's greatest success was reaching the 1901–02 Leinster Senior Cup final, losing to Bohemians in "wretched" weather at the Freebooters' ground. Tritonville competed for one season (1912–13) in the Irish League, one of only three Dublin clubs to do so; it also competed in the Irish Cup.

== Colours ==
The club played in red and blue.

== Ground ==
Tritonville played its games on grounds which were used by the GAA on Sundays for Gaelic games; as a result this attracted much controversy from the Belfast-based Irish Football Association who favoured Sabbatarianism.

Club	Games	Wins	Draws	Losses	For	Against	Points
Tritonville F.C.	18	2	1	15	27	55	5
