= 1912–13 Irish League =

Annual soccer tournament

Irish League
- Season: 1912–13
- Dates: 7 September 1912 – 26 December 1912
- Champions: Glentoran; 5th Irish title
- Relegated: Derry Celtic; Tritonville
- Matches played: 90
- Goals scored: 267 (2.97 per match)
- Biggest home win: Glentoran 8–0 Tritonville
- Biggest away win: Tritonville 1–5 Bohemians
- Highest attendance: Glentoran 8–0 Tritonville; Tritonville 3–5 Distillery

The 1912–13 Irish League was the 23rd edition of the Irish League, the highest level of league competition in Irish football.

The league comprised ten teams, and Glentoran won the championship for the 5th time and 2nd year in a row.

== Season summary ==
Bohemians returned to the league after not playing the previous season. They were elected alongside another Dublin club, Tritonville, who would only remain in the league for one season, finishing bottom.

== Teams and locations ==
Location of teams in the 1912–13 Irish League
Location of Belfast teams in the 1912–13 Irish League season
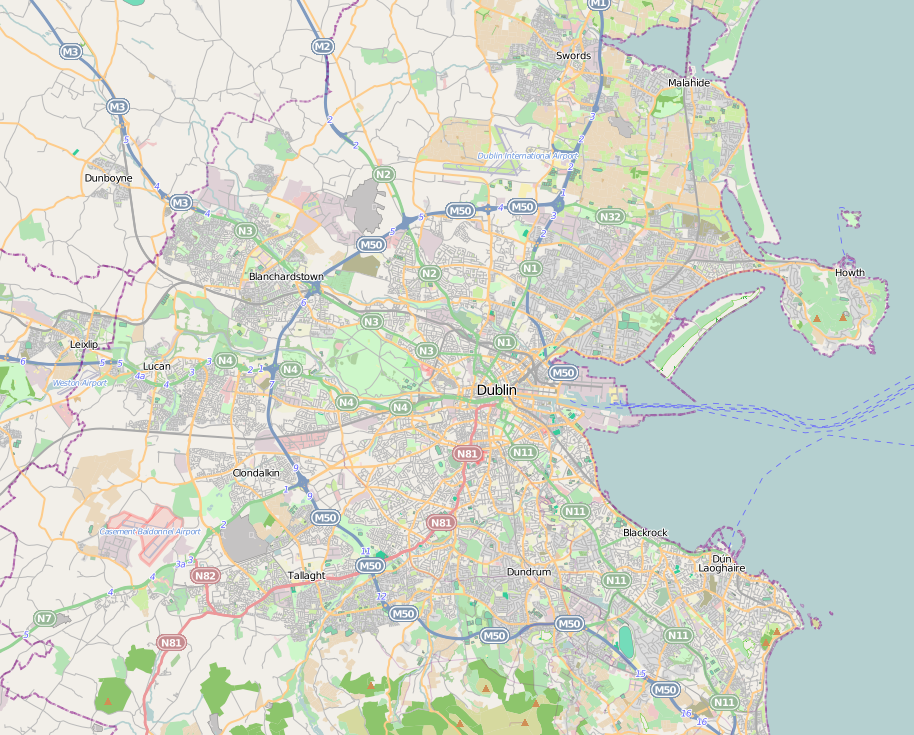
Location of Dublin teams in the 1912–13 Irish League season

Team	Town	Home Ground
Belfast Celtic	Belfast	Celtic Park
Bohemians	Dublin	Dalymount Park
Cliftonville	Belfast	Solitude
Derry Celtic	Derry	Brandywell
Distillery	Belfast	Grosvenor Park
Glenavon	Lurgan	Mourneview Park
Glentoran	Belfast	The Oval
Linfield	Belfast	Windsor Park
Shelbourne	Dublin	Sandymount Road
Tritonville	Dublin	Sandymount

== League standings ==
Pos	Team	Pld	W	D	L	GF	GA	GR	Pts	Result
1	Glentoran (C)	18	12	2	4	37	16	2.313	26	Champions
2	Distillery	18	11	2	5	34	17	2.000	24	
3	Linfield	18	9	5	4	29	23	1.261	23	
4	Glenavon	18	9	2	7	25	17	1.471	20	
5	Cliftonville	18	8	3	7	23	23	1.000	19	
6	Bohemians	18	8	2	8	31	28	1.107	18	
7	Belfast Celtic	18	7	4	7	24	26	0.923	18	
8	Shelbourne	18	7	4	7	20	23	0.870	18	
9	Derry Celtic (R)	18	3	3	12	17	39	0.436	9	Relegated
10	Tritonville (R)	18	2	1	15	27	55	0.491	5	Relegated

Source: rsssf.com
(C) Champions; (R) Relegated

== Results ==
Home \ Away	BCE	BOH	CLI	DCE	DIS	GLV	GLT	LIN	SHE	TRI
Belfast Celtic		1–0	3–1	3–0	1–1	0–0	2–3	0–0	2–0	5–3
Bohemians	4–0		1–1	3–0	1–4	1–0	4–1	1–2	3–0	4–2
Cliftonville	1–2	3–0		1–0	1–0	3–2	0–1	1–1	0–0	2–1
Derry Celtic	3–2	0–1	1–2		0–1	0–0	0–0	4–2	3–1	2–2
Distillery	0–2	5–1	1–0	3–0		3–0	1–0	1–2	1–1	4–1
Glenavon	1–0	3–0	2–0	3–0	2–1		2–3	0–1	3–1	2–0
Glentoran	2–0	2–1	0–2	5–0	0–1	2–0		0–0	2–0	8–0
Linfield	4–0	1–1	3–0	2–1	0–1	1–4	2–4		1–0	4–3
Shelbourne	1–1	2–0	3–0	4–2	2–1	1–0	0–2	1–1		1–0
Tritonville	2–0	1–5	2–5	4–1	3–5	0–1	1–2	1–2	1–2	

Source: Irish League Archive
Legend: Blue = home team win; Yellow = draw; Red = away team win.
