= Bill Worrall =

English footballer

Personal information
- Full name: William Edward Worrall
- Date of birth: 1 July 1886
- Place of birth: Shildon, England
- Position: Goalkeeper

Senior career*
Years	Team	Apps	(Gls)
1905	South Bank		
1905–1907	Middlesbrough	1	(0)
1907–1910	Shildon Athletic		
1910–1911	Sunderland	12	(0)
1911	Sunderland West End Wednesday		
1911–191?	Wingate Albion		
- * Club domestic league appearances and goals

William Edward Worrall (born 1 July 1886) was an English professional footballer who played as a goalkeeper for Sunderland.
