= North West Senior Cup (football) =

- Organiser(s): North West of Ireland Football Association
- Founded: 1886
- Region: Northern Ireland
- Current champions: Strabane Athletic (1st title)
- Most championships: Coleraine (21 titles (1 shared))

The North West Senior Cup or North West Cup is a senior football competition in Northern Ireland run by the North West Football Association. Senior and intermediate teams from the North West FA's jurisdiction (which covers County Londonderry and parts of County Tyrone), are entitled to enter. It originated as the County Londonderry F.A. Cup in 1886–87 but became the North West Cup in 1892.

== List of finals ==
Winner	Score	Runner-Up	Notes	
1886–87	Limavady	5–0	St Columb's Court	
1887–88	Limavady	6–0	Kilrea	
1888–89	Limavady	3–2	Rock	
1889–90	Limavady	4–2	St Columb's Court	
1890–91	St Columb's Court	4–3	Limavady	Replay. The first game ended 2-2.
1891–92	St Columb's Court	4–1	Limavady	
1892–93	Limavady	3–0	St Columb's Court	
1893–94	St Columb's Hall Celtic	3–1	Limavady	
1894–95	St Columb's Hall Celtic	5–2	Strabane	
1895–96	St Columb's Hall Celtic	5–2	Bright Stars	
1896–97	St Columb's Hall Celtic	4–1	North End	
1897–98	St Columb's Hall Celtic	2–0	St Columb's Court	
1898–99	Derry Celtic	3–0	St Columb's Court	
1899–1900	Derry Hibernians	1–0	Derry Celtic	3rd Replay. Game 1: 0-0; Game 2: 1-1; Game 3: 1-1
1900–01	Derry Celtic	4–0	Derry Hibernians	
1901–02	Derry Celtic	6–1	St Columb's Court	
1902–03	Derry Celtic	3–0	Derry Hibernians	
1903–04	Derry Hibernians	4–3	North End	
1904–05	Derry Hibernians	2–0	Inniskilling Fusiliers	
1905–06	Celtic Wanderers	4–1	Casuals	
1906–07	Celtic Wanderers	2–1	Casuals	
1907–08	Celtic Wanderers and Bright Stars (shared)			
1908–09	Celtic Wanderers	3–2	Hampshire Regiment	
1909–31	not played			
1931–32	Derry City	2–1	Coleraine	
1932–33	Derry City	4–0	Coleraine	
1933–34	Derry City	5–1	Coleraine	
1934–35	Derry City	1–0	Coleraine	
1935–36	Derry City	7–1	Ebrington	
1936–37	Derry City	6–2	Coleraine	
1937–38	no award			Derry City and Derry City Reserves qualified for the final which was unplayed due to scheduling issues.
1938–39	Derry City	8–1	Coleraine	
1939–40	no award			Derry City and Coleraine Crusaders qualified for the final which was unplayed due to scheduling issues.
1940–45	not played			
1945–46	Derry City	12–2	Coleraine Reserves	Two-legged final. 1st leg: 9–0; 2nd leg: 3–2.
1946–51	not played			
1951–52	Derry City Reserves	3–1	Foyle Stars	Replay. The first game ended 1-1.
1952–53	Coleraine Reserves	5–1	Derry City	
1953–54	Derry City	1–0	Coleraine	
1954–55	Coleraine	3–1	Derry City	Replay. The first game ended 3-3.
1955–56	Coleraine	2–1	Derry City	
1956–57	no award			Derry City and Coleraine qualified for the final which was unplayed due to fixture congestion of both teams.
1957–58	Coleraine and Derry City (shared)			Two finals were played which both ended in draws: 0–0 on 24 April and 1–1 on 1 May. Due to fixture congestion the North West FA decided to make Coleraine and Derry City joint holders for the year.
1958–59	Coleraine	2–1	Derry City	
1959–60	Derry City	1–0	Coleraine	
1960–61	Coleraine	9–0	Derry City	
1961–62	Derry City	3–1	Coleraine	
1962–63	Derry City	3–0	Coleraine	
1963–64	Derry City	2–0	Coleraine	
1964–65	Coleraine	2–1	Derry City	
1965–66	Derry City	2–1	Coleraine	
1966–67	Coleraine	3–2	Derry City	
1967–68	Coleraine	2–1	Derry City	Replay. The first game ended 1-1.
1968–69	Derry City	5–1	Coleraine	
1969–70	Coleraine	4–0	Derry City	Two-legged final. 1st leg: 3–0; 2nd leg: 1–0.
1970–71	Derry City	3–2	Coleraine	
1971–80	not played			
1980–81	Tobermore United	1–0	Omagh Town	
1981–82	Coleraine	6–2	Moyola Park	
1982–83	Coleraine	7–1	Roe Valley	
1983–87	not played			
1987–88	Coleraine	3–1	Oxford United Stars	
1988–89	Coleraine	2–1	Tobermore United	
1989–90	Tobermore United	2–0	Coleraine	
1990–91	Omagh Town	3–1	Coleraine	
1991–92	Coleraine	2–0	Park	
1992–93	Omagh Town	2–0	Coleraine	
1993–94	Limavady United	2–1	Coleraine	
1994–95	Coleraine	3–0	Limavady United	
1995–96	Omagh Town	5–1	Coleraine	
1996–97	Omagh Town	2–0	Coleraine	
1997–98	Institute	2–0	Limavady United	
1998–99	Limavady United	3–1	Oxford United Stars	
1999–2000	Omagh Town	5–2	Limavady United	
2000–01	Omagh Town	3–1	Limavady United	
2001–02	Coleraine	2–0	Omagh Town	
2002–03	Institute	5–0	Omgh Town	
2003–04	Coleraine	1–0	Limavady United	
2004–05	Limavady United	2–0	Institute	
2005–06	Coleraine	3–2	Institute	
2006–07	Tobermore United	2–1	Coleraine	
2007–08	Coleraine	5–2	Tobermore United	
2008–09	Institute	3–0	Limavady United	
2009–10	Coleraine	3–3	Limavady United	After extra time. Coleraine won 5–3 on penalties.
2010–11	Institute	3–0	Coleraine	
2011–12	Institute	4–2	Coleraine	
2012–13	Coleraine	3–0	Institute	
2013–14	Newbuildings United	2–2	Institute	After extra time. Newbuildings won 5–3 on penalties.
2014–15	Institute	3–1	Moyola Park	
2015–16	Limavady United	2–0	Coleraine	
2016–17	Institute	1–1	Coleraine	After extra time. Institute won 4–2 on penalties.
2017–18	Institute	3–1	Coleraine	
2018–19	Limavady United	0–0	Institute	After extra time. Limavady won 3–1 on penalties.
2019–20	Ballinamallard United	1–1	Dergview	After extra time. Ballinamallard won 5–4 on penalties.
2020–21	Dergview	3–2	Limavady United	
2021–22	Dergview	3–1	Ballinamallard United	
2022–23	Ballinamallard United	4–1	Coleraine	
2023–24	Limavady United	2–2	Institute	
2024–25	Coleraine	3–2	Ballinamallard United	
2025–26	Strabane Athletic	3–2	Limavady United	

== Performance by club ==
Club	Winners	Runners-up	Winning years	Runners-up years
Coleraine	22 (1 shared)	27	1954–55, 1955–56, 1957–58 (shared), 1958–59, 1960–61, 1964–65, 1966–67, 1967–68, 1969–70, 1981–82, 1982–83, 1987–88, 1988–89, 1991–92, 1994–95, 2001–02, 2003–04, 2005–06, 2007–08, 2009–10, 2012–13, 2024–25	1931–32, 1932–33, 1933–34, 1934–35, 1936–37, 1938–39, 1953–54, 1959–60, 1961–62, 1962–63, 1963–64, 1965–66, 1968–69, 1970–71, 1989–90, 1990–91, 1992–93, 1993–94, 1995–96, 1996–97, 2006–07, 2010–11, 2011–12, 2015–16, 2016–17, 2017–18, 2022–23
Derry City	17 (1 shared)	9	1931–32, 1932–33, 1933–34, 1934–35, 1935–36, 1936–37, 1938–39, 1945–46, 1953–54, 1957–58 (shared), 1959–60, 1961–62, 1962–63, 1963–64, 1965–66, 1968–69, 1970–71	1952–53, 1954–55, 1955–56, 1958–59, 1960–61, 1964–65, 1966–67, 1967–68, 1969–70
Derry Celtic‡	9	1	1893–94, 1894–95, 1895–96, 1896–97, 1897–98, 1898–99, 1900–01, 1901–02, 1902–03	1899–1900
Institute	8	5	1997–98, 2002–03, 2008–09, 2010–11, 2011–12, 2014–15, 2016–17, 2017–18	2004–05, 2005–06, 2012–13, 2013–14, 2018–19
Limavady United	6	8	1993–94, 1998–99, 2004–05, 2015–16, 2018–19, 2023–24	1994–95, 1997–98, 1999–2000, 2000–01, 2003–04, 2008–09, 2009–10, 2020–21
Omagh Town	6	2	1990–91, 1992–93, 1995–96, 1996–97, 1999–2000, 2000–01	1980–81, 2001–02
Limavady	5	3	1886–87, 1887–88, 1888–89, 1889–90, 1892–93	1890–91, 1891–92, 1893–94
Celtic Wanderers	4 (1 shared)	0	1905–06, 1906–07, 1907–08 (shared), 1908–09	—
Derry Hibernians	3	2	1899–1900, 1903–04, 1904–05	1900–01, 1902–03
Tobermore United	3	2	1980–81, 1989–90, 2006–07	1988–89, 2007–08
St Columb's Court	2	6	1890–91, 1891–92	1886–87, 1889–90, 1892–93, 1897–98, 1898–99, 1901–02
Dergview	2	1	2020–21, 2021–22	2019–20
Ballinamallard United	2	2	2019–20, 2022–23	2021–22, 2024-25
Coleraine Reserves	1	1	1952–53	1945–46
Bright Stars	1 (shared)	1	1907–08	1895–96
Derry City Reserves	1	0	1951–52	—
Newbuildings United	1	0	2013–14	—
Strabane Athletic	1	0	2025-26	—
North End	0	2	—	1896–97, 1903–04
Casuals	0	2	—	1905–06, 1906–07
Oxford United Stars	0	2	—	1987–88, 1998–99
Moyola Park	0	2	—	1981–82, 2014–15
Kilrea	0	1	—	1887–88
Rock	0	1	—	1888–89
Strabane	0	1	—	1894–95
Inniskilling Fusiliers	0	1	—	1904–05
Hampshire Regiment	0	1	—	1908–09
Ebrington	0	1	—	1935–36
Foyle Stars	0	1	—	1951–52
Roe Valley	0	1	—	1982–83
Park	0	1	—	1991–92

‡ Including 5 as St Columb's Hall Celtic.

== See also ==
- County Antrim Shield
- Mid-Ulster Cup
- Craig Memorial Cup

== Sources ==
- Northern Ireland Soccer Yearbook 2007/2008 (Ed. Malcolm Brodie)
- Ulster Football & Cycle Annual 1909/10
- George Glass, The Men from Scroggy.
