= Sherwood Foresters F.C. =

Former association football club

- Full name: Sherwood Foresters Football Club
- Nicknames: Merrie Men, Foresters
- Founded: 1889
- Dissolved: 1970
- Ground: varied as per stationing
Home colours

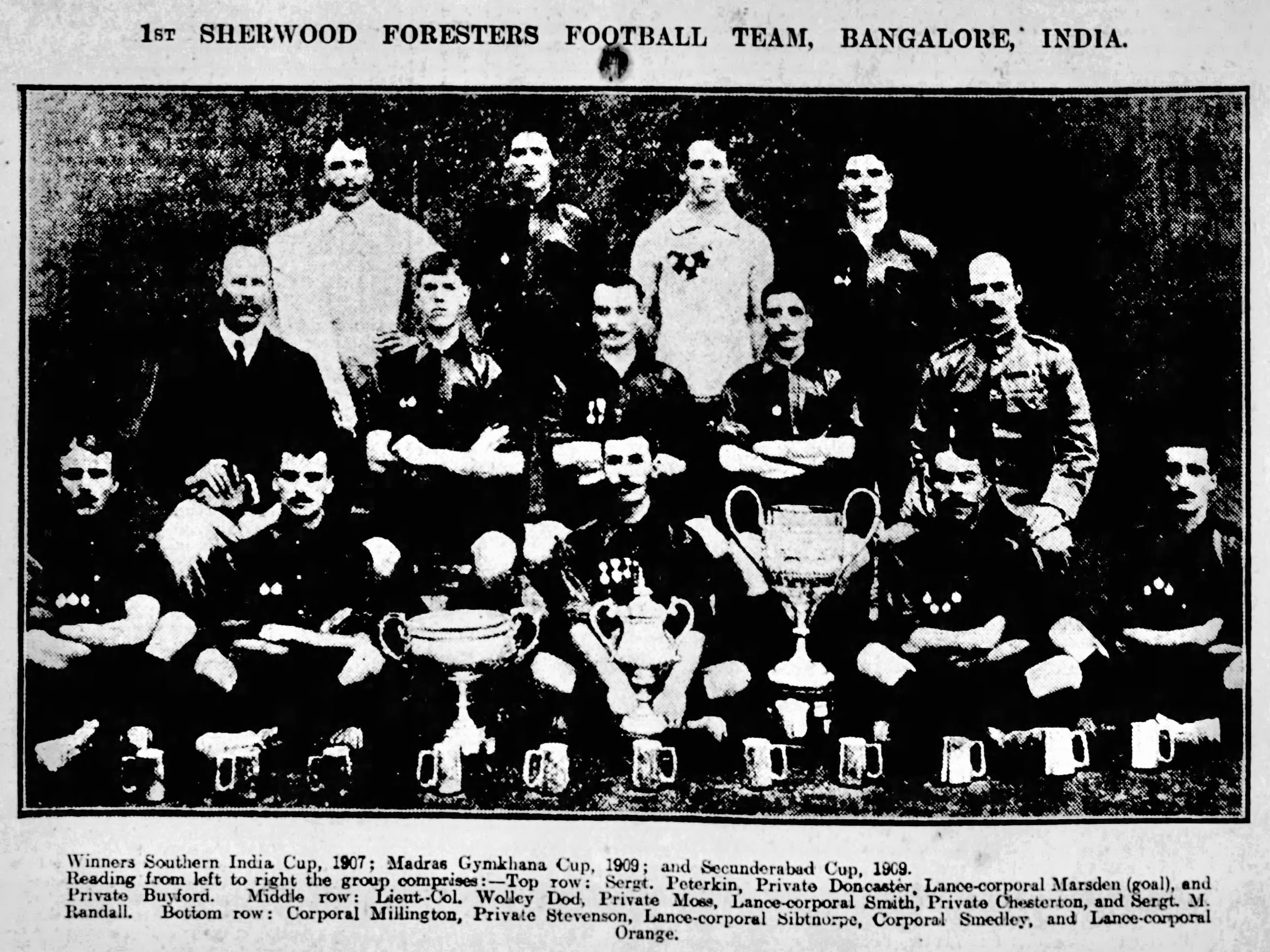
Sherwood Foresters Football Team, Guardian Journal, 3 May 1909, with trophies won while stationed in India

The Sherwood Foresters Football Club was the association football side formed by the First Battalion of the Sherwood Foresters regiment of the British Army.

== History ==
The club is first reported playing against other army sides in 1889. While stationed in Colchester in 1893–94, the club had its most successful season in English football, reaching the semi-final of the FA Amateur Cup and the fourth (and final) qualifying round of the FA Cup, the equivalent of the third round today. In the former tie, the club went down 1–0 to the Casuals before 4,000 spectators at Leyton; in the latter, the Foresters were 3–2 down at home to Luton Town, having been two goals up at half time, with 7 minutes of the then-optional extra-time remaining, when the referee stopped the tie because of darkness. The Foresters went down in the replay (at Luton) 2–1.

The Foresters moved to County Kildare in Ireland in 1895, as the southernmost association side on the island, and reached the final of the Irish Cup in 1896–97, beating Derry Celtic 3–2 at the Oval in the semi-final, having twice been behind. In the final, the Foresters faced Cliftonville at Grosvenor Park; the local side ran out 3–1 winners, the Foresters' goal being a consolation, right-winger Thorpe sending across a free-kick which the opposite winger Bedford converted.

The battalion was involved in the Boer War from 1899 to 1902, before moving to British India, where it won the Southern India Cup in 1907, the Madras Gymkhana and Secundersbad Cups in 1909, and the Wellington Cup in 1911, beating the Cameron Highlanders 3–0 in the final, the club accompanied by a dog as mascot for all its matches. Back in Britain, and while based in Devon, the club reached the quarter-final of the Amateur Cup in 1912–13, going down to Oxford City.

The 2nd Battalion of the Foresters won the Army Cup in 1910–11 and 1911–12, but the First Battalion secured a hat-trick of titles from 1929–30 to 1931–32, and was runner-up in 1962–63. The club mostly confined itself to Forces football, but in the 1930s played in the Walsall and District League, and amateur leagues in Derby in the 1950s.

In 1970, the Sherwood Foresters were amalgamated with the Worcestershire Regiment to form the Worcestershire and Sherwood Foresters Regiment (29th/45th Foot), which brought the First Battalion's XI to an end.

== Colours ==
The side normally wore the regimental colours chocolate and green, in quarters. In 1911, it wore white shirts with a dark sash, which may have been a change kit.

== Ground ==
The club played wherever the battalion was based; during the 1892–93 season, it moved to Colchester, and used the Cambridge Road ground for its competitive matches. When in Ireland it was based at the Curragh in Kildare.

After playing in British India in the late 1900s, the Foresters were based in Nottingham in 1909, and in 1910 to Plymouth, the Regimental XI playing its competitive fixtures at Home Park.

At the start of the 1930s, the side was based at Shorncliffe, and by 1933 was based in Lichfield. In the 1950s - by which time the 1st had taken over the 2nd - the merged battalion was at Derby.
