= Black Watch F.C. =

Association football club in Scotland

Black Watch
- Full name: Black Watch Football Club
- Nicknames: the Royals, the Kilties
- Founded: 1876
- Ground: varied according to stationing
Home colours

Black Watch F.C. is a British association football club. It is the footballing side of the 3rd Battalion, Royal Regiment of Scotland (the Black Watch).

== History ==
As an organized football club, the Black Watch F.C. was founded in 1876. The club's home depended on where the battalion was stationed.

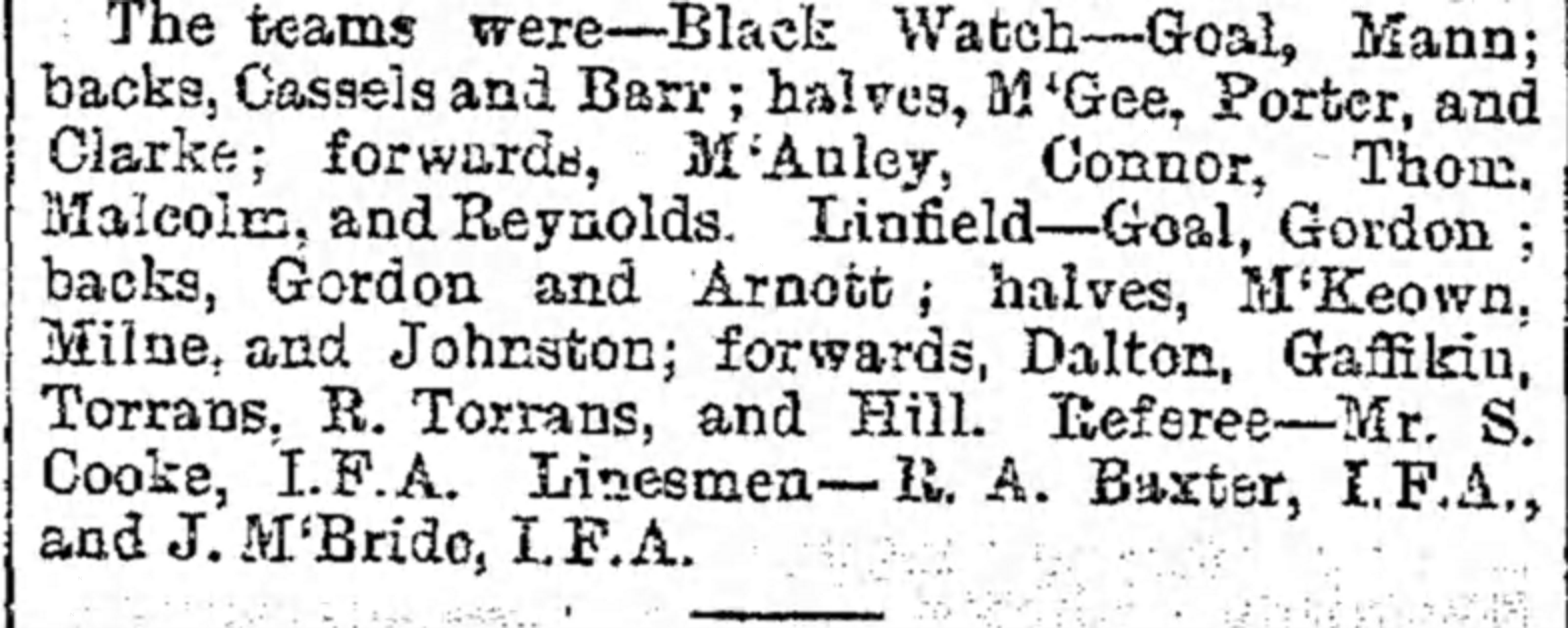
The sides in the Irish Cup final of 1891-92

=== Scottish Cup ===
In common with many military football sides in the amateur era, the club entered first-class competitions on a number of occasions. Normally based in Scotland, the club entered the Scottish Cup most years from 1893–94 to 1912–13.

In 1893–94, the club - at the time known as the Second Battalion, Black Watch - won through to the first round of the Cup proper, after only winning one match; the club benefitted from two byes and two draws with Cowlairs, having come from 3–0 down to draw 3–3 in the original tie at Springburn, which meant, under the rules of the competition at the time, both clubs progressed. In the first round the club lost 6–0 at Albion Rovers, 2,000 people attending Whifflet Park for the match.

The club won through the Scottish Qualifying Cup for the only time in 1905–06, reaching the last eight of the qualifying competition at a time when the last 16 were placed in the first round proper. The club was forced to scratch from its final Qualifying Cup replay with Dunblane because an Army Cup tie was due to be held on 8 November and the Scottish Football Association refused to grant an extension of time. In the first round proper the club lost 7–2 at St Mirren.

=== Highland and Perthshire League ===
From 1904 to 1906, and from 1926 to 1929, when the battalion was based in Fort George, the club played in the Highland League.

The club's best season in the Highland League was its first; it finished level on points at the top of the table with Clachnacuddin, but refused to play off for the title because of objections to the referee chosen. In its final season, the club finished bottom.

The battalion was stationed in Perthshire during World War 2, and took part in Perthshire competitions, winning the Perthshire League in 1941–42 and twice winning the Perthshire Cup.

=== Playing in Ireland ===
The club's finest achievements came when the battalion was stationed in Ireland from 1886 to 1892. In 1889–90, the club won the Belfast Charity Cup, beating the Gordon Highlanders - who had recently won the Irish Cup - by 5 goals to 3, having beaten Linfield 5–1 in the semi-finals. The club also won the County Antrim Shield in 1890–91 with a 4–2 win over Oldpark in the final.

In 1891–92, the club reached the final of the Irish Cup, with Cup holders Linfield gaining a significant revenge, by beating the club 7–0 at Solitude, in front of 8,000 spectators. One reason for the change in fortune was forward Robert Hill, who had scored one of the Black Watch goals in the 1890 semi-final, had switched from the Royals to the Blues.

=== Army football ===
As the game became more professional, the Black Watch stopped entering non-military competitions. The club has won the Army Cup on three occasions.

== Colours ==
In its senior days, the club mostly wore dark blue jerseys with a white collar. It also wore the following:

- 1894–95: green and red jerseys with black knickers
- 1895–96, 1898–99: maroon

== Grounds ==
The club is known to have played in the following areas:

- 1880–81: Dreghorn (Ayrshire)
- 1885–92: Ireland (Dublin, Limerick, Belfast)
- 1892–93: Campsie
- 1893–94: Glasgow
- 1895–1904: Edinburgh
- 1898–99: Lennoxtown
- 1904–11: Fort George
- 1911–26: Edinburgh
- 1926–29: Fort George
- 1939–43: Perthshire

== Legacy ==
Two clubs took their name from the club - Campsie Black Watch F.C. and Shankhouse Black Watch F.C., the formation of both inspired by the Black Watch playing games when stationed in those towns. Everton was nicknamed the Black Watch in its early days for its black kit.
