= Hilden F.C. =

Association football club in Lisburn, Northern Ireland

Hilden
- Full name: Hilden F.C.
- Founded: 1884
- Dissolved: 1923
- Ground: Hilden Football Ground
- Hon. President: J. Milne Barbour
Home colours

Hilden Football and Athletic Club was an association football club from Lisburn in Northern Ireland.

== History ==
The club's first match was a credibtable 4–1 defeat to the more experienced Hertford club just before Christmas 1884. Its first competitive football came in the 1885–86 Irish Cup, again losing 4–1 to Hertford. The club was in essence the works side of the William Barbour & Sons linen factory.

Hilden's best run was to the semi-final in 1888–89, which featured its biggest Cup win (13–0 over Seapatrick) and, in the semi-final against Distillery, its biggest defeat (by the same score).

As semi-professionalism coalesced around a handful of clubs in Ireland, Hilden moved into junior football, its last Irish Cup tie being a 12–1 defeat at home to Ulster in 1890–91. Hilden's biggest success was winning the Irish Junior Cup in 1896–97, thanks to a 2–0 win over Dunmurry at Grosvenor Park, the goals coming from M'Intyre and Curry.

The club joined the Irish Alliance in 1917, but the club's last recorded fixtures were in the 1922–23 season, with a new football side, Hilden Recreation, emerging in the 1930s.

== Colours ==
The club wore amber and black striped shirts.

== Ground ==
The club's ground was on the edge of the company premises and called simply the Hilden Football Ground.
