= Patrick Dougan =

Scottish footballer

Patrick Dougan (born 1889) was a Scottish professional footballer who played as a winger. He started his career with East Fife F.C. before moving to Football League Second Division side Burnley F.C. in February 1910. He made his Burnley debut on 28 March 1910 in the 2–3 away defeat to Hull City A.F.C., but failed to make another appearance for the club. In April 1910, he was released by Burnley and returned to East Fife.
