= Hertford F.C. =

Defunct association football club in Northern Ireland

- Full name: Hertford Football Club
- Founded: 1881
- Dissolved: 1888
- Ground: Thornhill
- Match secretary: H. G. Anderson
Home colours

Hertford Football Club was an association football from Lisburn, Northern Ireland, active in the 19th century.

== History ==
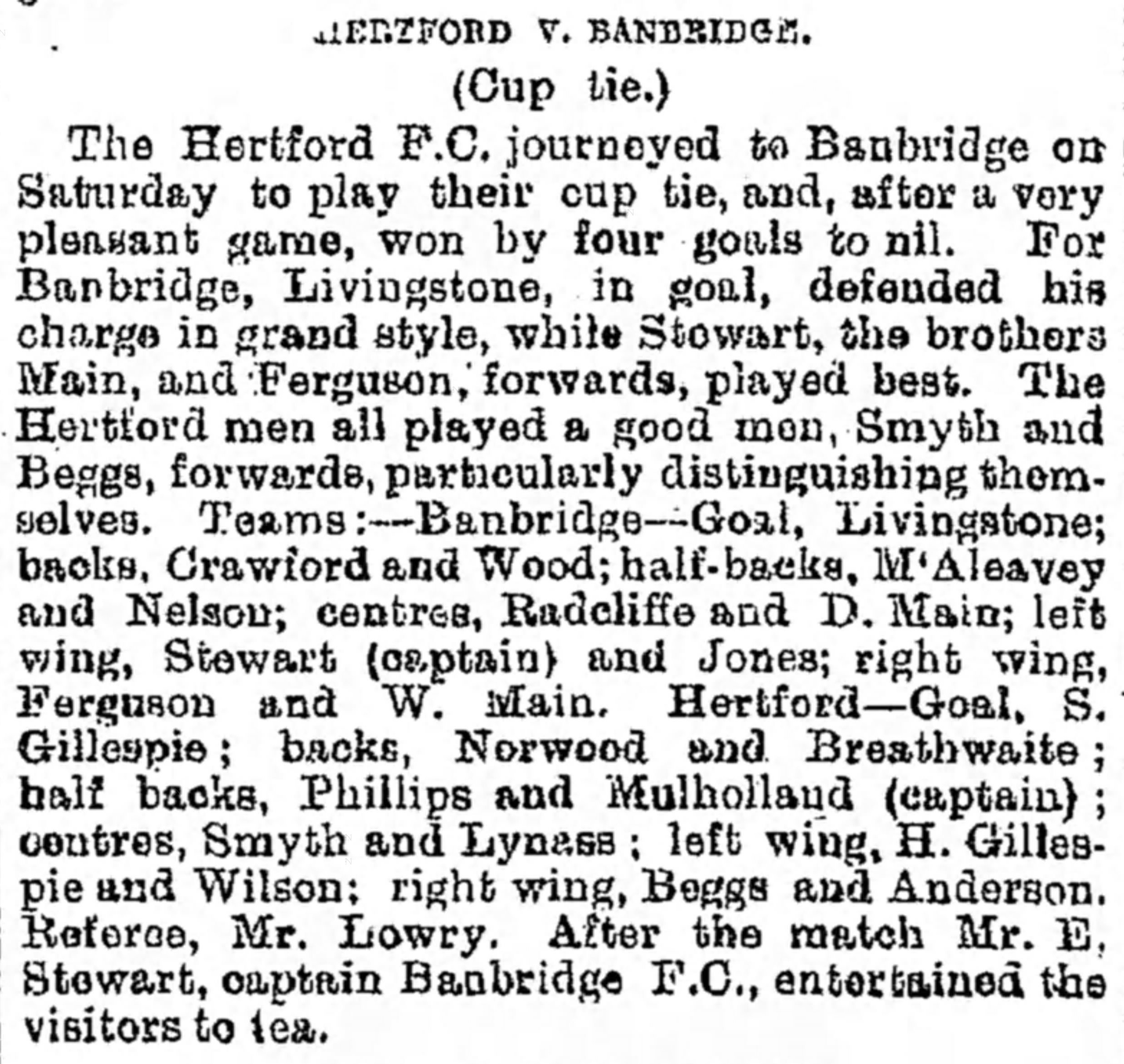
1884–85 Irish Cup 1st round, Banbridge 0–4 Hertford, Belfast News Letter, 8 December 1884

The club was founded in 1880, originally as a rugby union club under the Lisburn Football Club name, changing its name to Hertford (in honour of the Marquess of Hertford, the local landowner) before the 1881–82 season. In 1883 a junior football XI affiliated to the club, and in 1884 persuaded the club to plump wholesale for the association code, the rugby contingent forming the Lisburn Rugby Club.

Hertford's first competitive football came in the 1883–84 Irish Cup, losing 7–0 at Cliftonville in the first round, although Cliftonville was impressed by its opponent, considering that Hertford "gave evidence of yet becoming one of the best elevens in the district". Its second attempt the following season was much more successful as the club made it through to the final 5, losing 1–0 at home to eventual finalist Limavady.

Its last Irish Cup entry was in 1887–88, and in the second round the club was drawn to visit Millmount, but did not turn up, having given no notice of withdrawal. There is no further record of the club.

== Colours ==
The club wore black and white jerseys.

== Ground ==
The club played at the Thornhill ground.

== Notable players ==
- Shaw Gillespie, goalkeeper, who represented the Irish national side six times as a Hertford player, his final cap coming as captain in a 4–1 win over Wales.
