= Leinster Nomads A.F.C. =

Former association football club

- Full name: Leinster Nomads Association Football Club
- Nickname: the Nomads
- Founded: 1891
- Dissolved: 1895
- Ground: Sandymount Avenue
- President: John G. Nutting Esq
- Secretary: C. K. Bennett
Home colours

Leinster Nomads A.F.C. was an association football club based in Dublin, Ireland.

== History ==
The club was formed in 1891 by former members of Dublin Association F.C. Dublin Association had folded in 1890 after a dispute with the Irish Football Association (IFA) surrounding an Irish Cup semi-final tie with Cliftonville in which it was alleged that match officials were connected to Cliftonville. After the IFA refused to replay or terminate the tie, Dublin Association pulled out of the competition and folded as a club. The first match for the new club was a 5–0 defeat to Dublin University in the college park in November 1891, the Nomads being said to lack both combination and condition.

On 27 October 1892, Nomads were one of five football clubs present at the foundation of the Leinster Football Association (LFA), at a meeting in the Wicklow Hotel on Exchequer Street, Dublin. Shortly after, the LFA became affiliated to the Irish Football Association and the LFA soon organized their own cup competition, the Leinster Senior Cup, which was first played for in 1892–93; two months before the final, on its small college pitch, the university beat the Nomads 3–0, but on the larger Sandymount, the university players were pulled out of position, especially with wingers gravitating to the centre of the pitch, and two goals from Farrell - the second from a penalty after a handball - won the game for the Nomads; both sides were reduced to 10 men for much of the second half through injury. Bohemians and Shelbourne then duopolized the cup for the next twenty-four years.

The Nomads also entered the 1892–93 Irish Cup, and thanks to byes only required one win (4–1 at Moyola Park) to reach the final 6, but there lost to Distillery, conceding five goals in the second half; a protest about the state of the pitch was dismissed. The club lost its other two ties in the competition.

On 23 April 1894, the Leinster Senior League was agreed, with the Nomads as one of the six founding clubs. However the competition seems not to have completed its first season, as Phoenix withdrew during the season, and not all fixtures were played; Bohemians was declared champion, the Nomads having won 2 of their 5 played fixtures.

The club lost the use of its ground before the 1895–96 season, and was unable to secure a replacement, so disbanded, with players joining other sides in the city.

== Colours ==
The club played in all white.

== Ground ==
The club played at Sandymount, originally near a location known as the Vinery, and the club moved to Sandymount Avenue before the 1893–94 season.

== International and Inter-provincial representation ==
Unlike its predecessor club, Dublin Association, the Nomads never had players represented on the Ireland team. The club itself saw this as a political move by the Belfast-based Irish Football Association, claiming that the IFA's selection committee of five men in Belfast were preventing anyone outside of that city to represent Ireland. The team did have representation in select teams representing the Leinster FA and Dublin. On 9 December 1893, in Belfast, two Nomads members were part of a Leinster team that faced Ulster, including R.H. Harrison, who captained the side.

Leinster Football Association (LFA) interprovincials 1893-1895

- (Leinster) R.H. Harrison
- (Leinster) D.J. Morrogh
- (Leinster) Bennett
- (Leinster) Gillespie
- (Leinster) Keogh

Dublin inter-county representatives 1893-1895

- (Dublin) D. Morrogh
- (Dublin) Gillespie
- (Dublin) Keogh

== Honours ==
- Leinster Senior Cup
  - Winners: 1892–93: 1
