= King's Own Scottish Borderers F.C. =

Former association football club in Northern Ireland

King's Own Scottish Borderers
- Nickname: the Borderers
- Ground: varied
- Secretary: Capt. T. P. Wingate
- League: Irish Football League
Home colours

The King's Own Scottish Borderers Football Club (also referred to as 2nd K.O.S.B.) was the association football team of the 2nd battalion of the King's Own Scottish Borderers.

== History ==
The club was one of many army sides which played football in India when deployed there, and the club twice won the Durand Cup.

While deployed at the Victoria Barracks, Belfast, the team played in the Irish Football League for the 1903–04 season. Previously, the battalion had been resident in Dublin, where it played in the Leinster Senior League.

The unit was sent to Glasgow in 1907 and entered the Scottish Qualifying Cup in 1907–08, losing 5–1 at Renton in the first round, despite Wreford keeping "a brilliant goal" for the visitors. The club entered again in 1908–09 but scratched to Lennox Amateurs.

== Colours ==
The club played in red jerseys.

== Ground ==
The club's ground depended on where the battalion was deployed. In its Scottish Qualifying Cup entries, the club was playing out of the Maryhill barracks.

== Honours ==
=== In British India ===
- Durand Cup
  - Winners (2): 1891, 1892
- IFA Shield (Note: Fourth oldest club cup, organized by the Indian Football Association (IFA) and played between Indian clubs and other invited ones.)
  - Runners-up (2): 1903, 1941

== See also ==
- 5th King's Own Scottish Borderers F.C.
