= Dublin Association F.C. =

- Full name: Dublin Association
- Nickname(s): the Metropolitans
- Founded: 1883
- Dissolved: 1890
- Ground: Sandymount
- Hon. secretary: F. W. Butler
- Match secretary: Frank G. Armytage
colours

The Dublin Association Football Club was an association football club based in Dublin, Ireland. Dublin Association was the first football club to be formed in Dublin and the first club outside of Ulster to be affiliated with the Irish Football Association. The club existed between 1883 and 1890 and played in the Irish Cup.

== History ==
Dublin Association was formed at Tyrone Place (now Cathedral Street) in October 1883, with players from well-heeled clubs such as Old Carthusians, St Mark's, Cliftonville, City, and Notts County, and the first captain being H. L. Pocock of Pilgrims. Initially, the team had little in the way of competition, with only 12 men turning up for their first game, however a month later, students from Trinity College would form a rival club called Dublin University A.F.C. The first-ever "Dublin Derby" was played at College Park on 7 November 1883 when Association met and defeated the university, 4–0. Association's goals were scored by W. Butler (2), H.J. Hamilton and C. Clegg.

By 1884, there were five teams in the city, including a Scottish infantry battalion side. Both Dublin Association and Dublin University would enter the Irish Cup in 1883–84; with the draw being regionalized the two clubs played each other in the first round at College Park, Dublin winning 3–2. However Dublin scratched from its tie with Wellington Park, being unable to travel to Belfast. The club did however visit England for a friendly at Walsall Town, notably a side from the "upper crust", although the match itself was less than friendly, ending with the Midland side 3–1 to the good after the crowd "broke in". Its first season however was overall a successful one, with 6 wins in 9 matches, and a membership of 50.

The club would last for seven years. It continued to enter the Irish Cup, either losing to Belfast clubs, or scratching when drawn to play one. In 1889–90, the club reached the semi-final, beating the University 3–1 in the second round and Limavady 6–2 in the third; Limavady unsuccessfully protested its surprise defeat, the basis of it being that the Association had recruited a number of British Army footballers stationed at the Curragh, including five from the 93rd Highlanders, who held the Army Cup at the time.

In the semi-final against Cliftonville, held at Linfield's Ulsterville ground in front of 4,000 spectators, Association was 3–0 down at half-time, hindered by an injury to Harris which rendered him hors de combat, but pulled the score back to 3–2 by the end. However, one of the umpires at the match was a member of the Cliftonville club, and, while it was normal practice at the time for each side to provide an umpire for regular matches, rule 13 of the competition rules forbade that for the semi-final and final of the Cup, so the IFA ordered a replay. The replay (at Ulster's Ballynafeigh) also went the Redshirts' way, by 4 goals to 2, despite the Metropolitans bringing back a number of Army players for the replay, thanks to a mix of Clugston's goalkeeping and incessant Association complaints about refereeing.

Despite the prospect of a new league competition, and with the Metropolitans being touted as a founder member, Association pulled out of the competition and folded as a club. Following this, a number of Dublin Association members would go on to form a new club called the Leinster Nomads.

== Colours ==
The club wore red and blue 3" stripes, with white knickers and blue stockings.

== Ground ==
The club's usual practice area was at Nine Acres, Phoenix Park, and thanks to the wealth of Armytage was able to secure a private ground at Donnybrook. It 1884 it was using a ground at Sandymount.

== Notable former players ==
Brothers Willoughby and William Hamilton were the first and only two Dublin Association players to represent Ireland when they played against Wales on 11 April 1885. The match, the last to be played as part of the 1884–85 British Home Championship ended with a 2–8 loss to the Welsh in Belfast.
