= YMCA F.C. (Belfast) =

- Full name: YMCA Football Club
- Founded: 1883 (folded 1889) reformed 1891
- Dissolved: 1892
- Ground: Prospect 1883-87; Shaftesbury Ground 1887-89; Enfield 1891
- League: Irish Football League
Home colours

YMCA Football Club was an Irish association football club based in Belfast in 1883. They were formed by the members of the Belfast Young Men's Christian Association (YMCA). They were amalgamated with Cliftonville in 1889.

== History ==
It was founded in 1883 and competed as a senior club in the Irish Cup. Its best season was 1888–89, when the club reached the final of both the Irish Cup and the first County Antrim Shield, losing to Distillery on both occasions. In the County Antrim Shield final played at the Ulster Cricket Ground, YMCA lost to Distillery 8-4. The club also competed that season in the 1888-89 FA Cup. YMCA supplied S. Scott to play for the Ireland national football team in the 1888–89 British Home Championship. Later in 1889, however, the club folded, with most players joining Cliftonville, in what was described as an "amalgamation". This was attributed to the YMCA not having a suitable football pitch of their own because of the increase in Belfast building meaning spare green spaces were not available. They amalgamated with Cliftonville despite a £40 (£5,628 in 2023) subvention payment from the YMCA parent organisation to support them to continue as an independent club.

In 1891, however, the YMCA Athletic Club acquired the Enfield ground on the Crumlin Road with a view to reviving the football team for the 1891-92 season. The revival was not a success, however, and the team, bottom of the league, resigned before Christmas. The club appears to have folded in 1892.

== Colours ==
The club wore Cambridge blue shirts and white knickers.
