= Clarence F.C. =

Football club based in Belfast, Northern Ireland

- Full name: Clarence Football Club
- Founded: 1882
- Dissolved: 1892
- Ground: Colin View (1882–86); Strandmillis (1886–92)
- Hon. Secretary: H. A. Crowe
- League: Irish Football League

Clarence Football Club was a football club based in Belfast, Northern Ireland.

== History ==
It was founded in 1882 and was a founding member of the Irish Football League in 1890. It was originally associated with the Church of Ireland Young Men's Society (CIYMS), and named after Clarence Place Hall, the then headquarters of CIYMS. The link between the two was dissolved at the start of the 1890–91 season.

The club resigned at the start of the 1891-92 season without playing any matches, having been unable to raise a team for its opening fixture. The club's equipment was put up for sale in April 1892, and the club was formally wound up at a meeting at Fishers Restaurant in Donegal Place on 30 June 1892.

== Ground ==
The club's first ground was at Colin View. It moved to Strandmillis Park in 1886.
