= Derry Celtic F.C. =

Derry Celtic
- Full name: Derry Celtic Football Club
- Founded: 1890
- Dissolved: 1913
- Ground: The Brandywell
- Final season; 1912–13: Irish League, 9th
Home colours

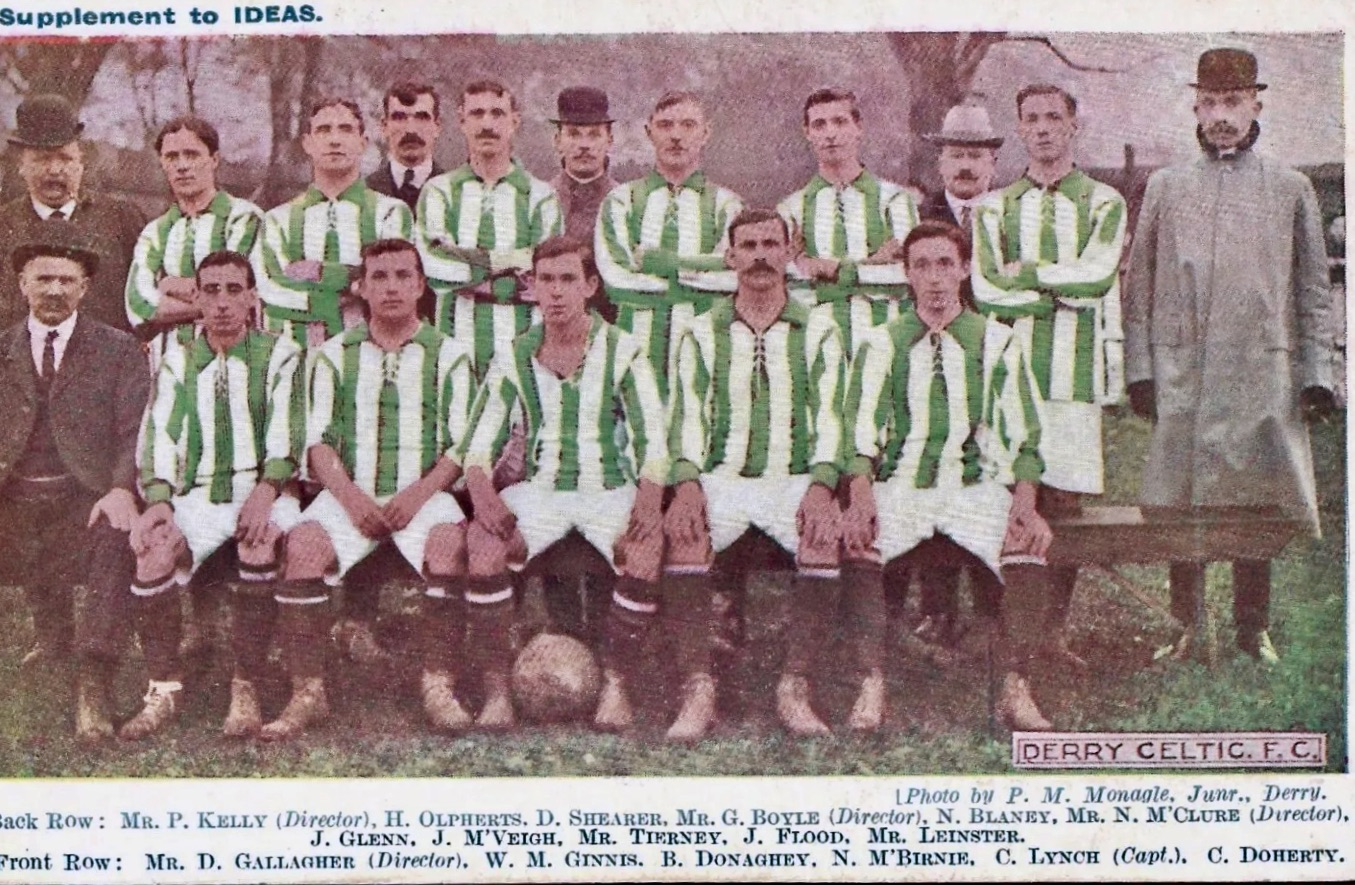
Derry Celtic F.C., 1905

Derry Celtic Football Club was a football club from Derry, Ireland.

== History ==
The club, formed as St Columb's Hall in 1890, changing to Derry Celtic in 1893, and St Columb's Hall Celtic in 1896, was once the primary team in the city, but was voted out of the Irish League in 1913 and is now defunct.

The club reached the Irish Cup final in the 1897–98 season, losing 0–2 to Linfield. The club competed in the Irish League for the first time in 1900–01, finishing its first season without a single win. Things began to improve in the next few seasons for Derry Celtic: the club picked up its first win in the 1901–02 season and achieved 6th place. They followed this up by finishing 5th in the 1902–03 season; however, this would prove to be Celtic's most successful season, only ever climbing to 5th once again in the 1909–10 season. In 1913, the club resigned from the Irish League, defected to the Gaelic Athletic Association and never again played senior football. Derry City took over from the club as the city's main side after their formation in 1928 and their subsequent acceptance into the Irish League in 1929.

== Colours ==
The club played in green and white striped shirts, and white knickers until 1905, and black knickers afterwards.

== Ground ==
The club played at Celtic Park (now the Derry GAA stadium) from 1894 to 1900, and at the Brandywell (now Derry City's stadium) from 1900.

== Notable players ==
- Barney Donaghey, capped for Ireland in 1902 while a Derry Celtic player

== Honours ==
=== Senior honours ===
- County Londonderry Cup/North West Senior Cup: 9
  - 1893–94, 1894–95, 1895–96, 1896–97, 1897–98, 1898–99, 1900–01, 1901–02, 1902–03
