= St Columb's Court F.C. =

St Columb's Court
- Full name: St Columb's Court Football Club
- Founded: 1886
- Dissolved: 1960
- Ground: The Brandywell
Home colours

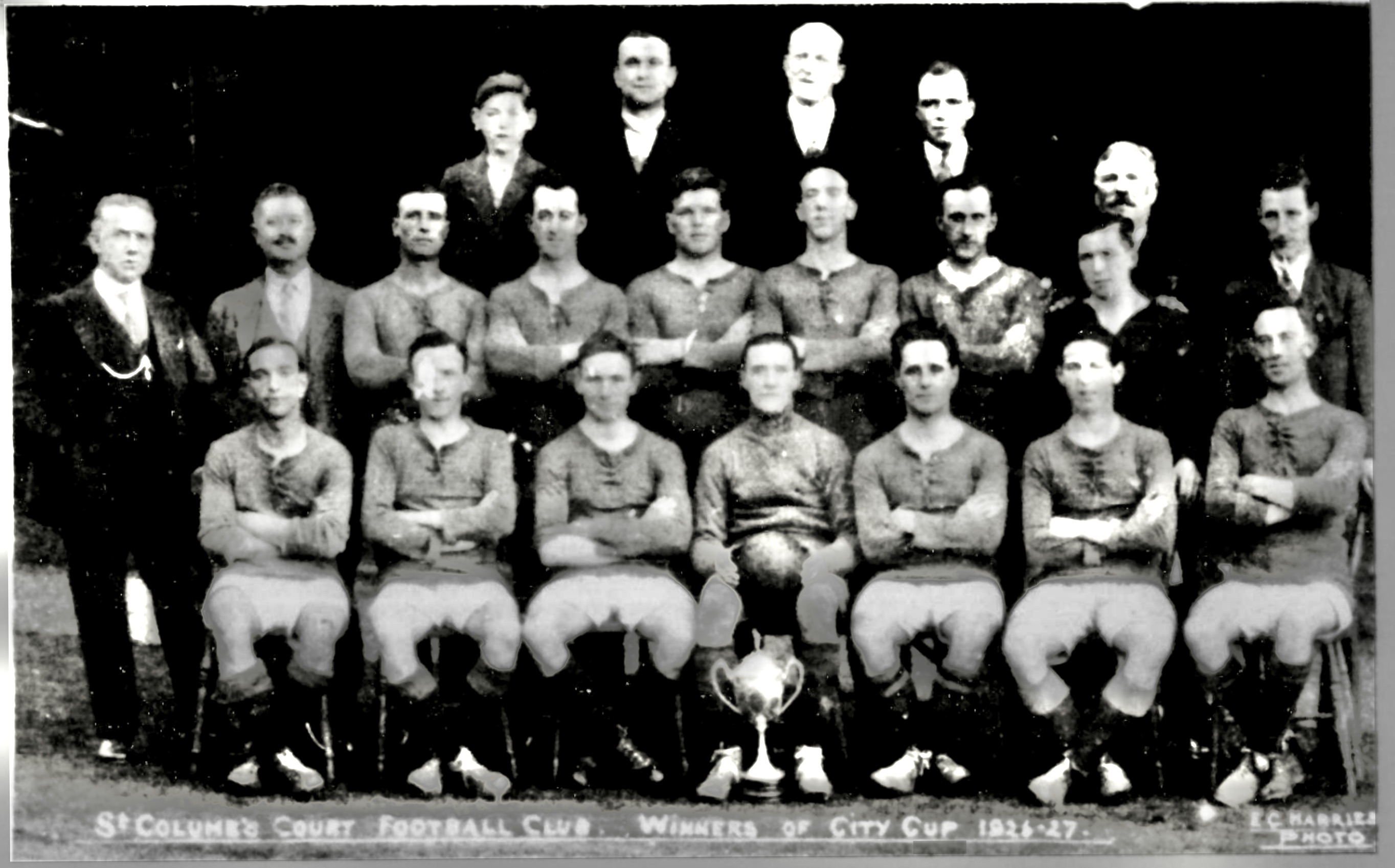
St Columb's Court with the City Cup, 1926–27

St Columb's Court Football Club was a football club from Derry, Northern Ireland.

== History ==
The club was formed in 1886, its first match being a defeat to a Limavady reserve XI, and it was a founder member of the County Derry Football Association and joined the Irish Football Association in 1888. It was associated with the Loyalist community.

Court played in the Irish League for one season in 1901–02, when they finished bottom, and reached the semi-finals of the Irish Cup on three occasions.

The club continued at a junior level until the 1958–59 season, but by June 1960 it was defunct.

== Colours ==
The team wore red shirts.

== Ground ==
The club's original ground was at Lone Moor Road. It played at Celtic Park (now the Derry GAA stadium) from 1894 to 1900, and at the Brandywell (now Derry City's stadium), on which it erected a pavilion. from 1900.

== Notable players ==
- James Wilton, capped for Ireland in 6 times between 1888 and 1893 while a Court player.

== Honours ==
=== Senior honours ===
- County Londonderry Cup: 2
  - 1890–91, 1891–92
