= Dublin University A.F.C. =

- Full name: Dublin University Association Football Club
- Founded: 1883
- Ground: College Park, Dublin
- League: Leinster Senior League; College & Universities Football League; League of Ireland B Division; League of Ireland U21 Division
- Website: http://duafc.ucoz.com/
Home colours	Away colours

Dublin University Association Football Club is an Irish association football club based at Trinity College Dublin. Founded in 1883, Dublin University A.F.C. is the oldest surviving association football club in the Republic of Ireland. Their senior men's team currently competes in the Leinster Senior League. They have previously played in both the League of Ireland B Division and the League of Ireland U21 Division. The club also enters teams in the College & Universities Football League, the Women's Soccer Colleges Association of Ireland League, the Collingwood Cup and the FAI Intermediate Cup. The club has previously entered teams in both the Irish Cup and the FAI Cup.

== History ==
=== Early years ===
In 1883 a group of former Trinity College Dublin students formed Dublin Association F.C., following a meeting in Tyrone Place, later to become Cathedral Street. Shortly after, the current students at TCD formed Dublin University A.F.C. and on 7 November 1883 the two clubs met in one of the earliest organised association football games played in Dublin. Dublin Association won the game 4–0. By 1890 Dublin Association was disbanded, leaving Dublin University A.F.C. as the oldest surviving association football club in the Republic of Ireland. On 30 November 1883 at College Park, Dublin University A.F.C. also played in the first ever game between a Belfast and Dublin team, losing 6–0 to Belfast Athletic. In 1883–84, together with Dublin Association, they became one of the first two Dublin clubs to compete in the Irish Cup. They continued to compete in the Irish Cup between 1883–84 and 1888–89, again from 1893–94 to 1899–1900 and then sporadically until 1912–13. Their best season came in 1885–86 when they reached the semi-final after scoring 18 goals without reply in the first four rounds. Ireland international, William Eames, captained the team from half-back. On 19 December 1885, Eames scored a goal in the 7–0 defeat of Clifton Park in the third round, adding three further goals in the 6–0 defeat of Banbridge in the next round. However, in the semi-final on 13 February 1886 they lost 4–0 to Distillery.

On 27 October 1892 Dublin University A.F.C. became founder members of the Leinster Football Association. The LFA soon organized their own cup competition, the Leinster Senior Cup which was first played for in 1892–93. The inaugural final saw Leinster Nomads defeat Dublin University 2–1. Dublin University also played in the 1893–94 and 1894–95 finals, losing both to Bohemians after replays. Dublin University also became founder members of the Leinster Senior League.

=== Intervarsity ===
Dublin University A.F.C. is affiliated to the Irish Universities Football Union and regularly competes in annual intervarsity competitions such as the Collingwood Cup, the Farquhar Cup, the Crowley Cup and the Harding Cup. In 1914, together with University College Dublin, Queen's University Belfast and University College Galway, Dublin University entered the inaugural Collingwood Cup tournament. However, during the First World War/Irish War of Independence era, the club ceased to exist and despite several attempts at a relaunch, it was not until 1939 that the club was reformed. In 1947 and 1949 Dublin University shared the Collingwood Cup with QUB and UCD respectively. However the club would have to wait until 1967 before it won the Collingwood Cup outright for the first time. In the final at College Park they defeated QUB 1–0 with a penalty scored five minutes from the end. In 1979 with a team featuring Hugo MacNeill and coached by Liam Tuohy, Dublin University won the Collingwood Cup outright for a second time. MacNeill scored twice in the final as Dublin University defeated Maynooth University 2–0.

=== National level ===
In the late 1960s Dublin University rejoined the Leinster Senior League and in 1975 they were elected to the League of Ireland B Division. In 2005 when the B Division was reformed as the League of Ireland U21 Division, they remained in the new division. However the U21 Division operated as a summer league and Dublin University struggled to field teams during the summer months when the university was closed. After three years of summer football, Dublin University's senior team re-joined the Leinster Senior League in 2008–09.

== Grounds ==
Dublin University play their home matches at College Park, Dublin. They also play at their grounds in Santry. Throughout their history, the club has also played at grounds in Clontarf and Grangegorman. They have also ground shared with both Jacobs Football Club and St Patrick's Athletic.

== Notable former coaches ==
- (Scotland) John Colrain
- (Republic of Ireland) Billy Dixon
- (Republic of Ireland) Arthur Fitzsimons
- (Republic of Ireland) John Keogh
- (Republic of Ireland) Ronnie Nolan
- (Republic of Ireland) Liam Tuohy
- (Republic of Ireland) Billy Young

== Notable former players ==
Ireland (IFA) internationals

Frederick Moorhead and William Eames were the first two Dublin University players to represent Ireland when they played against England on 28 February, 1885. They were also the first two Dublin-based players to be selected for Ireland. Between 1885 and 1895 nine Dublin University players were capped by Ireland in the British Home Championship. These include Willoughby Hamilton who was a Dublin Association player when capped. Lewis Scott was the last Dublin University player to represent Ireland at senior international level when he played against Scotland on 30 March 1895.

- (Ireland) Lionel Bennett
- (Ireland) William Eames
- (Ireland) Manliffe Goodbody
- (Ireland) Willoughby Hamilton
- (Ireland) Frederick Moorhead
- (Ireland) Edward Roper
- (Ireland) Lewis Scott
- (Ireland) Richard Smyth
- (Ireland) Edward Whitfield

Ireland Amateurs (IFA) internationals

- (Ireland) H.E. Rutherford
- (Ireland) P.A. Meldon

Ireland rugby union international

- (Ireland) Hugo MacNeill

Ireland women's rugby union international

- (Ireland) Hannah Tyrrell

== Club presidents ==
- (Republic of Ireland) Sean Barrett

== Honours ==
- Leinster Senior Cup
  - Runners-up: 1892–93, 1893–94, 1894–95: 3
- Collingwood Cup
  - Winners: 1947, (Note: Dublin University and QUB shared the cup in 1947) 1949, (Note: Dublin University and UCD shared the cup in 1949) 1967, 1979: 4
  - Runners-up: 1941, 1970, 1990, 1996, 2002, 2015: 6
- Harding Cup
  - Winners: 1983, 1992, 1997, 2018: 4
