= Limavady F.C. =

Historic football club in Ireland

Limavady
- Full name: Limavady Football Club
- Nickname(s): the Lims, the lads from the Roe
- Founded: 1884
- Dissolved: 1902
- Ground: Scroggy Field
- Secretary: William James Moore
Home colours

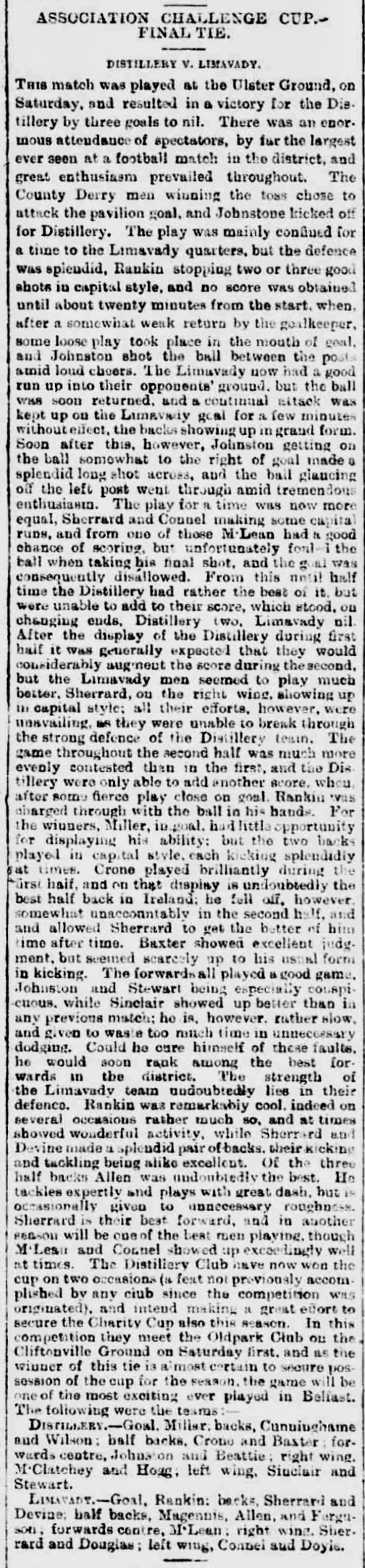
1885 Irish Cup Final, Distillery 3–0 Limavady, Belfast News-Letter, 23 March 1885

Limavady Football Club was an Irish football club from Limavady, County Londonderry, which was twice runner-up in the Irish Cup.

== History ==
The club was formed at a meeting at Given's Hall in Limavady on 13 October 1884, when the two senior clubs in the town, Alexander F.C. and Limavady Wanderers, agreed to pool resources for the purposes of putting one club forward in competitions to represent the town.

The club immediately asserted a prominence in the Irish game, even attracting Rock F.C. from Dumbarton over to play a friendly in January 1885. It was also ambitious enough to go on tour in England at the start of 1886, beating Everton 1–0 thanks to a goal from Joe Sherrard.

The club's first entry to the Irish Cup, in 1884–85, saw it reach the final, where it lost 3–0 to Distillery. Limavady repeated the feat the following season, but lost 1–0 to the same side in a match that was so ill-tempered that, after a Limavady protest about rough play, the Cup and medals were withheld, and both clubs were temporarily expelled from the Irish Football Association, with some thought was given to re-playing the final between the beaten semi-finalists.

The club appealed the decision, setting up a rival County Londonderry Association as a back-up plan, but legal action by Richard Baxter of Distillery ensured that the Irish FA awarded the medals, given that, as Judge Ross Q.C. pointed out, "although the game was rather rough, the rules of the Association are against [the Irish FA]." Ill-feelings between the two clubs evaporated surprisingly quickly - Crone of Distillery lent Limavady a hand in a four-a-side tournament three months after the final.

The loss of the club's practice ground in 1888, coupled with an Irish FA rule change on player eligibility, put the club into a decline from which it never recovered. It did gain its record victory in the Irish Cup in October 1889, when it beat the Royal Irish Constabulary 13–0 away from home, but it only once more reached the fourth round of the Cup, and was not one of those which joined the Irish Football League on its formation, due to the difficulties and expense of travelling to Belfast for half of its games; some of its players were recruited for the short-lived Derry Olympic side in 1892–93 when the area was invited to send a side to the League.

The club did at least have success on a more local level, winning the County Londonderry F.A. Cup five times in its first seven editions, and won the local "double" in 1892–93 when beating St Columb's Court 5–1 in the final of the Charity Cup. It lost in the final of the County Cup in 1893–94, and never reached so far in the competition again.

The club withdrew from the 1895–96 Irish Cup before playing and lost the only ties it played afterwards. Its last entry to the Irish Cup was in 1898–99 and it scratched to St Columb's Court. The club still had a fitful existence in 1901, with former stalwart player Connolly Sherrard having become chairman, but by this time, despite Sherrard's efforts, the club was described as a "remnant", and the club was certainly defunct by the end of 1902.

== Colours ==
The club adopted red, white, and blue as its colours at its initial meeting. The colours were arranged as tricoloured "striped" (in the context of the time, hooped) jerseys and white pants.

== Ground ==
The club played at Scroggy Field, about half-a-mile from the centre of town. Its practice pitch was granted by Mr S. M. Alexander free of charge; however, after his death in 1888, the club lost the use of this, but it was granted a practice field by Mr S. M. Macrory JP from 1889.

== Notable players ==
Six Limavady players were capped by Ireland:

- Jim Allen (1 cap, 1887)
- Nat Brown (1 cap, 1887)
- Orr Devine (4 caps, 1886-88)
- George Forbes (1 cap, 1888)
- T. McClean (1 cap, 1885)
- Joe Sherrard (3 caps, 1885-88).

== Honours ==
=== Senior honours ===
- County Londonderry Cup/North West Senior Cup: 5
  - 1886–87, 1887–88, 1888–89, 1889–90, 1892–93
- North West Charity Cup: 1
  - 1892–93
