= Fred McKee =

Irish footballer

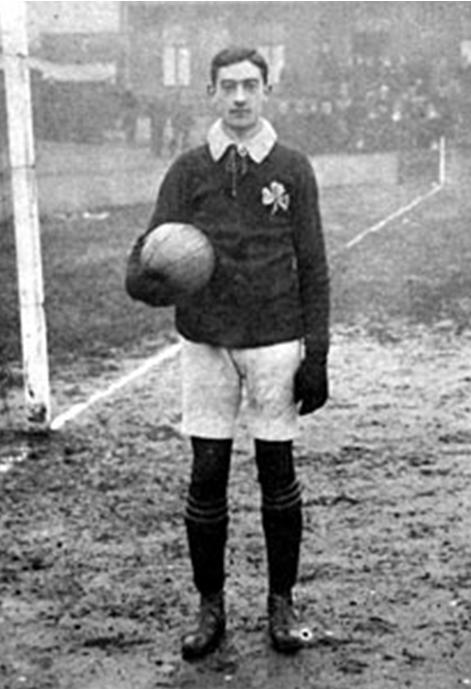

Personal information
- Full name: Frederick William McKee
- Date of birth: 31 August 1883
- Place of birth: Ireland
- Date of death: 19 October 1956 (aged 73)
- Position: Goalkeeper

Senior career*
Years	Team	Apps	(Gls)
1905–1910	Cliftonville		
1912	Bradford City		
1913–1914	Ulster		
1914–1918	Belfast Celtic		
1918–1923	Linfield		

International career
1906–1914	Ireland	5	(0)
- * Club domestic league appearances and goals

Frederick William McKee (born 31 August 1883) was an Irish association football goalkeeper who played for, among others, Belfast-based clubs Cliftonville, Belfast Celtic and Linfield, and the national team of Ireland. At club level, McKee celebrated five Irish League titles and five Irish Cups. In 1914, he was a member of the Ireland team that won the British Home Championship - the only edition at which (united) Ireland became the unshared winners of the Championship.

== Irish International ==
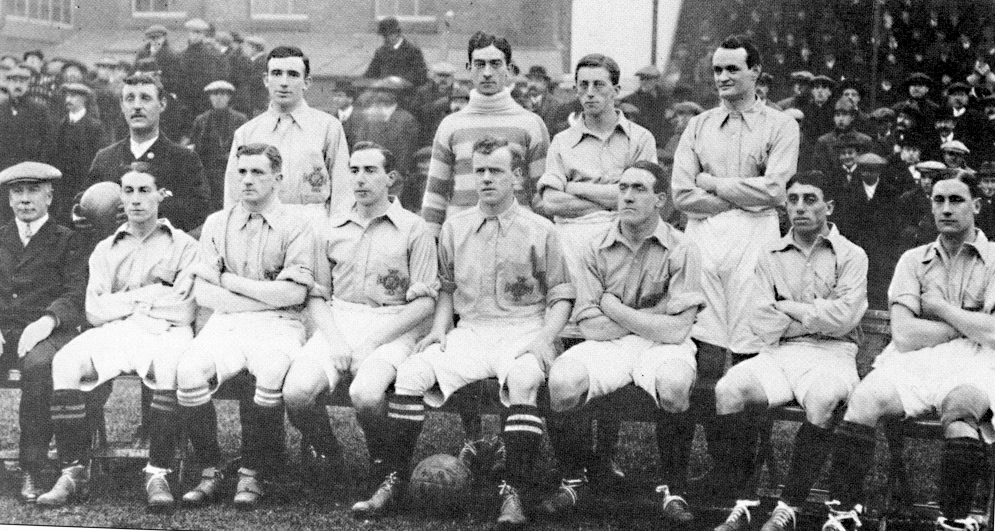
Fred McKee (second player on left of back-row) with the Ireland team vs. Wales during the 1914 British Home Championship

Fred McKee made his debut for Ireland at the 1906 British Home Championship on 17 March, in a 0–1 defeat to Scotland at Dalymount Park. His teammates that day included Robert Milne and Jack Kirwan. In spite of holding Wales at a 4–4 draw in his second international (the last tournament match), Ireland ended last. Much more memorable was his participation at the 1914 British Home Championship. He played all three matches, and with a clean sheet against England and only two goals conceded in his other appearances, McKee contributed to the unique victory at the British Home Championship. While the Irish team in 1903 still shared their victory with England and Scotland, this was the only occasion at which the team of (united) Ireland became sole winners.

== Honours ==
=== Club ===
Cliftonville

- Irish League: 1905–06 (shared), 1909–10
- Irish Cup: 1906–07, 1908–09
- Belfast Charity Cup: 1905–06, 1907–08, 1908–09

Belfast Celtic

- Irish League: 1914–15
- Irish Cup: 1917–18

Linfield

- Irish League: 1921–22, 1922–23
- Irish Cup: 1921–22, 1922–23
- County Antrim Shield: 1921–22, 1922–23

=== International ===
Ireland

- British Home Championship: 1914
