= 1900–01 Belfast Charity Cup =

Tournament details
- Country: Ireland
- Date: 15 April 1901 – 27 April 1901
- Teams: 5

Final positions
- Champions: Linfield (7th win)
- Runners-up: Distillery

Tournament statistics
- Matches played: 5
- Goals scored: 17 (3.4 per match)

The 1900–01 Belfast Charity Cup was the 18th edition of the Belfast Charity Cup, a cup competition in Irish football.

Linfield won the tournament for the 7th time, defeating Distillery 4–1 in the final.

== Results ==
=== Quarter-finals ===
Team 1	Score	Team 2
Cliftonville	2-2	Linfield
Celtic	bye	
Glentoran	bye	
Linfield	bye	

==== Replay ====
Team 1	Score	Team 2
Cliftonville	0–1	Linfield

=== Semi-finals ===
Team 1	Score	Team 2
Glentoran	0-1	Distillery
Linfield	6-0	Celtic

=== Final ===
27 April 1901

Linfield	4–1	Distillery
Peden 2'; Mercer 10'; J. Maxwell 44'; G. Maxwell 87'	Report	McCann 5'

Solitude, Belfast
Attendance: 6,500
Referee: J. M. Wilton (Derry)
