= 1929–30 Belfast Charity Cup =

Tournament details
- Country: Northern Ireland
- Teams: 8

Final positions
- Champions: Linfield (19th win)
- Runners-up: Belfast Celtic

Tournament statistics
- Matches played: 7
- Goals scored: 43 (6.14 per match)

The 1929–30 Belfast Charity Cup was the 47th edition of the Belfast Charity Cup, a cup competition in Northern Irish football.

Linfield won the title for the 19th time, defeating Belfast Celtic 2–0 in the final.

== Results ==
=== Quarter-finals ===
Team 1	Score	Team 2
Belfast Celtic	5–1	Cliftonville
Distillery	5–2	Willowfield
Glentoran	7–2	Linfield Rangers
Linfield	6–2	Brantwood

=== Semi-finals ===
Team 1	Score	Team 2
Belfast Celtic	4–2	Glentoran
Linfield	3–2	Distillery

=== Final ===
17 May 1930

Linfield	2–0	Belfast Celtic
Bambrick 57', 85'	Report

Solitude, Belfast
Referee: Mr W. R. Hamilton
