= 1898–99 Belfast Charity Cup =

Tournament details
- Country: Ireland
- Date: 29 March 1899 – 22 April 1899
- Teams: 5

Final positions
- Champions: Linfield (6th win)
- Runners-up: Distillery

Tournament statistics
- Matches played: 4
- Goals scored: 12 (3 per match)

The 1898–99 Belfast Charity Cup was the 16th edition of the Belfast Charity Cup, a cup competition in Irish football.

Linfield won the tournament for the 6th time, defeating Distillery 2–1 in the final.

== Results ==
=== Quarter-finals ===
Team 1	Score	Team 2
Cliftonville	1–0	Celtic
Distillery	bye	
Glentoran	bye	
Linfield	bye	

=== Semi-finals ===
Team 1	Score	Team 2
Distillery	5–0	Glentoran
Linfield	2–1	Cliftonville

=== Final ===
22 April 1899
15:30 GMT

Linfield	2–1	Distillery
Milne; Gordon	Report	Mercer

Solitude, Belfast
Attendance: 12,000
