= 1887–88 Belfast Charity Cup =

Tournament details
- Country: Ireland
- Date: 28 January 1888 – 5 May 1888
- Teams: 8

Final positions
- Champions: Cliftonville (4th win)
- Runners-up: Linfield

Tournament statistics
- Matches played: 9
- Goals scored: 49 (5.44 per match)

The 1887–88 Belfast Charity Cup was the 5th edition of the Belfast Charity Cup, a cup competition in Irish football.

Cliftonville won the tournament for the 4th time and 3rd consecutive year, defeating Linfield 3–2 in the final.

== Results ==
=== Quarter-finals ===
Team 1	Score	Team 2
Clarence	0–6	Distillery
Cliftonville	2–1	Oldpark
Linfield	1–3^{1}	Limavady
Ulster	1–5	YMCA

^{1}The match was ordered to be replayed after a protest by Linfield.

==== Replay ====
Team 1	Score	Team 2
Linfield	7–0^{1}	Limavady

^{1}The match was ordered to be replayed after a protest by Limavady.

==== Second replay ====
Team 1	Score	Team 2
Linfield	4–2	Limavady

=== Semi-finals ===
Team 1	Score	Team 2
Cliftonville	6–1	YMCA
Linfield	4–1	Distillery

=== Final ===
5 May 1888

Cliftonville	3–2	Linfield
Macpherson; Elleman; Barry	Report	Peden; S. Torrans

Ulster Cricket Ground, Belfast
Referee: J. Sinclair
