= 1924–25 Belfast Charity Cup =

Tournament details
- Country: Northern Ireland
- Teams: 16

Final positions
- Champions: Glentoran (6th win)
- Runners-up: Belfast Celtic

Tournament statistics
- Matches played: 15
- Goals scored: 46 (3.07 per match)

The 1924–25 Belfast Charity Cup was the 42nd edition of the Belfast Charity Cup, a cup competition in Northern Irish football.

Glentoran won the tournament for the 6th time, defeating Belfast Celtic 2–1 in the final.

== Results ==
=== First round ===
Team 1	Score	Team 2
Ards	0–1	Bangor
Barn	3–2	Larne
Cliftonville	2–2	Belfast Celtic
Distillery	2–0	Brantwood
Glenavon	1–0	Portadown
Glentoran	3–2	Crusaders
Linfield	3–0	Linfield Rangers
Queen's Island	0–3	Willowfield

==== Replay ====
Team 1	Score	Team 2
Belfast Celtic	1–0	Cliftonville

=== Quarter-finals ===
Team 1	Score	Team 2
Bangor	0–1	Distillery
Glentoran	5–3	Willowfield
Linfield	0–2 (a.e.t.)	Belfast Celtic
Barn	w/o	Glenavon

=== Semi-finals ===
Team 1	Score	Team 2
Belfast Celtic	3–1	Distillery
Glentoran	3–0	Barn

=== Final ===
16 May 1925

Glentoran	2–1	Belfast Celtic
Keenan; Rainey	Report	Mahood

Solitude, Belfast
Referee: Mr J. B. Stark
