= 1886–87 Belfast Charity Cup =

Tournament details
- Country: Ireland
- Date: 29 January 1887 – 7 May 1887
- Teams: 8

Final positions
- Champions: Cliftonville (3rd win)
- Runners-up: YMCA

Tournament statistics
- Matches played: 7
- Goals scored: 41 (5.86 per match)

The 1886–87 Belfast Charity Cup was the 4th edition of the Belfast Charity Cup, a cup competition in Irish football.

Cliftonville won the tournament for the 3rd time and 2nd consecutive year, defeating YMCA 3–2 in the final.

== Results ==
=== Quarter-finals ===
Team 1	Score	Team 2
Cliftonville	5–1	Wellington Park
Distillery	5–1	Oldpark
Limavady	2–3	YMCA
Ulster	3–5	Linfield

=== Semi-finals ===
Team 1	Score	Team 2
Cliftonville	5–1	Linfield
YMCA	4–1	Distillery

=== Final ===
7 May 1887

Cliftonville	3–2	YMCA
Brown; Barry	Report	Forsythe; Lemon

Ulster Cricket Ground, Belfast
