= 1933–34 Belfast Charity Cup =

Tournament details
- Country: Northern Ireland
- Teams: 8

Final positions
- Champions: Linfield (21st win)
- Runners-up: Distillery

Tournament statistics
- Matches played: 7
- Goals scored: 35 (5 per match)

The 1933–34 Belfast Charity Cup was the 51st edition of the Belfast Charity Cup, a cup competition in Northern Irish football.

Linfield won the title for the 21st time and 2nd consecutive year, defeating Distillery 4–1 in the final.

== Results ==
=== Quarter-finals ===
Team 1	Score	Team 2
Belfast Celtic	5–2	Brantwood
Cliftonville	0–1	Linfield
Distillery	2–1	Dunmurry
Glentoran	6–2 (a.e.t.)	Crusaders

=== Semi-finals ===
Team 1	Score	Team 2
Distillery	4–3	Belfast Celtic
Linfield	4–0	Glentoran

=== Final ===
19 May 1934

Linfield	4–1	Distillery
Baird; Bambrick	Report	Moody

Solitude, Belfast
Referee: Mr Sam Thompson
