= 1926–27 Belfast Charity Cup =

Tournament details
- Country: Northern Ireland
- Teams: 8

Final positions
- Champions: Linfield (17th win)
- Runners-up: Glentoran

Tournament statistics
- Matches played: 7
- Goals scored: 23 (3.29 per match)

The 1926–27 Belfast Charity Cup was the 44th edition of the Belfast Charity Cup, a cup competition in Northern Irish football.

Linfield won the tournament for the 17th time, defeating Glentoran 5–2 in the final.

== Results ==
=== Quarter-finals ===
| Team 1 | Score | Team 2 |
|---|---|---|
| Belfast Celtic | 3–1 | Willowfield |
| Cliftonville | 0–1 | Linfield |
| Distillery | 1–2 | Queen's Island |
| Glentoran | 3–1 | Crusaders |

=== Semi-finals ===
| Team 1 | Score | Team 2 |
|---|---|---|
| Glentoran | 2–1 | Queen's Island |
| Linfield | 1–0 | Belfast Celtic |

=== Final ===
14 May 1927

| Linfield | 5–2 | Glentoran |
|---|---|---|
| Matthews; Miller; McCaw | Report | Bambrick |

Solitude, Belfast
Referee: Mr W. Cowan
