= 1890–91 Belfast Charity Cup =

Tournament details
- Country: Ireland
- Date: 18 April 1891 – 2 May 1891
- Teams: 8

Final positions
- Champions: Linfield (1st win)
- Runners-up: Ulster

Tournament statistics
- Matches played: 7
- Goals scored: 41 (5.86 per match)

The 1890–91 Belfast Charity Cup was the 8th edition of the Belfast Charity Cup, a cup competition in Irish football.

Linfield won the tournament for the 1st time, defeating Ulster 7–1 in the final.

== Results ==
=== Quarter-finals ===
Team 1	Score	Team 2
Cliftonville	5–1	Clarence
Distillery	3–1	Oldpark
Linfield	2–1^{1}	Black Watch
Ulster	4–1^{2}	Glentoran

^{1}The original match was abandoned with five minutes remaining. The remainder of the match (including extra time) was played four days later.
^{2}The match was abandoned after crowd disturbances and awarded to Ulster.

=== Semi-finals ===
Team 1	Score	Team 2
Linfield	3–1	Distillery
Ulster	7–4	Cliftonville

=== Final ===
2 May 1891
15:30 GMT

Linfield	7–1	Ulster
S. Torrans; Hill; Peden; Gaffikin	Report	Reynolds

Solitude, Belfast
Attendance: 6,000
Referee: Mr J. Sinclair
