= 1922–23 Belfast Charity Cup =

Tournament details
- Country: Northern Ireland
- Date: 16 April 1923 – 24 May 1923
- Teams: 10

Final positions
- Champions: Glentoran (5th win)
- Runners-up: Crusaders

Tournament statistics
- Matches played: 13
- Goals scored: 36 (2.77 per match)

The 1922–23 Belfast Charity Cup was the 40th edition of the Belfast Charity Cup, a cup competition in Northern Irish football.

Glentoran won the tournament for the 5th time, defeating Crusaders 2–1 in the final.

== Results ==
=== First round ===
| Team 1 | Score | Team 2 |
|---|---|---|
| Cliftonville | 0–1 | Crusaders |
| Distillery | 1–2 | Bangor |
| Glentoran | 2–0 | Dunmurry |
| Linfield | 2–1 | Willowfield |
| Queen's Island | 1–1 | Brantwood |

==== Replay ====
| Team 1 | Score | Team 2 |
|---|---|---|
| Brantwood | 1–1 | Queen's Island |

==== Second replay ====
| Team 1 | Score | Team 2 |
|---|---|---|
| Queen's Island | 5–3 | Brantwood |

=== Quarter-finals ===
| Team 1 | Score | Team 2 |
|---|---|---|
| Queen's Island | 2–1 | Bangor |
| Crusaders | bye | |
| Glentoran | bye | |
| Linfield | bye | |

=== Semi-finals ===
| Team 1 | Score | Team 2 |
|---|---|---|
| Crusaders | 1–1 | Linfield |
| Glentoran | 1–1 | Queen's Island |

==== Replays ====
| Team 1 | Score | Team 2 |
|---|---|---|
| Crusaders | 2–1 | Linfield |
| Glentoran | 2–0 | Queen's Island |

=== Final ===
23 May 1923

| Glentoran | 2–1 | Crusaders |
|---|---|---|
| McNally; Keenan | Report | Alexander |

Solitude, Belfast
Referee: Mr J. B. Stark
