= 1902–03 Belfast Charity Cup =

Tournament details
- Country: Ireland
- Date: 30 March 1903 – 16 May 1903
- Teams: 6

Final positions
- Champions: Linfield (8th win)
- Runners-up: Glentoran

Tournament statistics
- Matches played: 9
- Goals scored: 27 (3 per match)

The 1902–03 Belfast Charity Cup was the 20th edition of the Belfast Charity Cup, a cup competition in Irish football.

Linfield won the tournament for the 8th time, defeating Glentoran 2–0 in the final.

== Results ==
=== Quarter-finals ===
Team 1	Score	Team 2
Cliftonville	5–0	Ulster
Linfield	3–1	Belfast Celtic
Distillery	bye	
Glentoran	bye	

=== Semi-finals ===
Team 1	Score	Team 2
Glentoran	2–2	Distillery
Linfield	3–1	Cliftonville

==== Replay ====
Team 1	Score	Team 2
Glentoran	0–0	Distillery

==== Second replay ====
Team 1	Score	Team 2
Glentoran	0–1^{1}	Distillery

^{1}The match was ordered to be replayed after a protest from Glentoran.

==== Third replay ====
Team 1	Score	Team 2
Glentoran	3–3	Distillery

==== Fourth replay ====
Team 1	Score	Team 2
Glentoran	1–0	Distillery

=== Final ===
16 May 1903

Linfield	2–0	Glentoran
Carnegie; Maxwell	Report

Solitude, Belfast
Attendance: 3,000
Referee: Mr Hammond (Heywood)
