= 1885–86 Belfast Charity Cup =

Tournament details
- Country: Ireland
- Date: 3 April 1886 – 1 May 1886
- Teams: 8

Final positions
- Champions: Cliftonville (2nd win)
- Runners-up: Glentoran

Tournament statistics
- Matches played: 8
- Goals scored: 29 (3.63 per match)

The 1885–86 Belfast Charity Cup was the 3rd edition of the Belfast Charity Cup, a cup competition in Irish football.

Cliftonville won the tournament for the 2nd time, defeating Glentoran 5–1 in the final.

== Results ==
=== Quarter-finals ===
Team 1	Score	Team 2
Cliftonville	1–0 (a.e.t.)	Clifton Park
Distillery	4–2	YMCA
Oldpark	1–0	Wellington Park
Ulster	1–4	Glentoran

=== Semi-finals ===
Team 1	Score	Team 2
Cliftonville	3–2	Distillery
Oldpark	2–1 (a.e.t.)^{1}	Glentoran

^{1}Oldpark won after unlimited extra time, effectively a golden goal. A replay was ordered after a Glentoran protest.

==== Replay ====
Team 1	Score	Team 2
Glentoran	2–0	Oldpark

=== Final ===
1 May 1886
15:30 GMT

Cliftonville	5–1	Glentoran
Molyneaux; Brown; Turner; Ellesman; McPherson	Report	Baxter

Ulster Cricket Ground, Belfast
Referee: Mr Parlance
