= 1927–28 Belfast Charity Cup =

Tournament details
- Country: Northern Ireland
- Teams: 8

Final positions
- Champions: Linfield (18th win)
- Runners-up: Belfast Celtic

Tournament statistics
- Matches played: 7
- Goals scored: 36 (5.14 per match)

The 1927–28 Belfast Charity Cup was the 45th edition of the Belfast Charity Cup, a cup competition in Northern Irish football.

Linfield won the tournament for the 18th time and 2nd consecutive year, defeating Belfast Celtic 4–0 in the final.

== Results ==
=== Quarter-finals ===
Team 1	Score	Team 2
Cliftonville	0–6	Linfield
Crusaders	4–2	Queen's Island
Distillery	2–3	Belfast Celtic
Glentoran	5–1	Willowfield

=== Semi-finals ===
Team 1	Score	Team 2
Belfast Celtic	3–1	Glentoran
Linfield	4–1	Crusaders

=== Final ===
19 May 1928

Linfield	4–0	Belfast Celtic
Bambrick; Houston; Somerset; Ferguson (o.g.)	Report

Solitude, Belfast
Referee: Mr McClean
