= 1892–93 Belfast Charity Cup =

Tournament details
- Country: Ireland
- Date: 15 April 1893 – 6 May 1893
- Teams: 8

Final positions
- Champions: Linfield (3rd win)
- Runners-up: Distillery

Tournament statistics
- Matches played: 8
- Goals scored: 29 (3.63 per match)

The 1892–93 Belfast Charity Cup was the 10th edition of the Belfast Charity Cup, a cup competition in Irish football.

Linfield won the tournament for the 3rd time and 3rd consecutive year, defeating Distillery 3–2 in the final.

== Results ==
=== Quarter-finals ===
Team 1	Score	Team 2
Celtic	0–1	Linfield
Cliftonville	1–0	Ligoniel
Cliftonville Olympic	1–7	Distillery
Glentoran	3–2	Ulster

=== Semi-finals ===
Team 1	Score	Team 2
Distillery	2–2	Cliftonville
Linfield	2–1	Glentoran

=== Final ===
6 May 1893
15:30 GMT

Linfield	3–2	Distillery
Peden; R. Torrans	Report	Hall; Kyle

Solitude, Belfast
Referee: Mr R. Irvine
