= 1917–18 Belfast Charity Cup =

Tournament details
- Country: Ireland
- Date: 10 April 1918 – 4 May 1918
- Teams: 6

Final positions
- Champions: Linfield (14th win)
- Runners-up: Glentoran

Tournament statistics
- Matches played: 5
- Goals scored: 11 (2.2 per match)

The 1917–18 Belfast Charity Cup was the 35th edition of the Belfast Charity Cup, a cup competition in Irish football.

Linfield won the tournament for the 13th time and 2nd consecutive year, defeating Glentoran 1–0 in the final.

== Results ==
=== Quarter-finals ===
Team 1	Score	Team 2
Cliftonville	0–3	Belfast United
Distillery	3–0	Belfast Celtic
Glentoran	bye	
Linfield	bye	

=== Semi-finals ===
Team 1	Score	Team 2
Glentoran	3–0	Distillery
Linfield	1–0	Belfast United

=== Final ===
4 May 1918

Linfield	1–0	Glentoran
McBean	Report

Solitude, Belfast
Referee: George Maginnis
