= 1921–22 Belfast Charity Cup =

Tournament details
- Country: Northern Ireland
- Date: 5 April 1922 – 13 May 1922
- Teams: 10

Final positions
- Champions: Linfield (16th win)
- Runners-up: Cliftonville Olympic

Tournament statistics
- Matches played: 10
- Goals scored: 26 (2.6 per match)

The 1921–22 Belfast Charity Cup was the 39th edition of the Belfast Charity Cup, a cup competition in Northern Irish football.

Linfield won the tournament for the 16th time, defeating Cliftonville Olympic (the reserve side of Cliftonville) 3–0 in the final.

== Results ==
=== First round ===
Team 1	Score	Team 2
Cliftonville Olympic	1–0	Distillery
Forth River	0–6	Linfield
Glentoran	1–0	Belfast United
Linfield Rangers	0–2	Cliftonville
Queen's Island	3–2	Brantwood

=== Quarter-finals ===
Team 1	Score	Team 2
Cliftonville	0–1	Glentoran
Cliftonville Olympic	bye	
Linfield	bye	
Queen's Island	bye	

=== Semi-finals ===
Team 1	Score	Team 2
Cliftonville Olympic	2–0	Glentoran
Linfield	1–1	Queen's Island

==== Replay ====
Team 1	Score	Team 2
Linfield	3–0	Queen's Island

=== Final ===
13 May 1922

Linfield	3–0	Cliftonville Olympic
Cowan; McIlreavy	Report

Solitude, Belfast
Attendance: 3,000
Referee: Mr George Jenkins
