= 1923–24 Belfast Charity Cup =

Tournament details
- Country: Northern Ireland
- Teams: 12

Final positions
- Champions: Cliftonville (10th win)
- Runners-up: Barn

Tournament statistics
- Matches played: 14
- Goals scored: 36 (2.57 per match)

The 1923–24 Belfast Charity Cup was the 41st edition of the Belfast Charity Cup, a cup competition in Northern Irish football.

Cliftonville won the tournament for the 10th time, defeating Barn 1–0 in the final.

== Results ==
=== First round ===
Team 1	Score	Team 2
Bangor	1–0	Ards
Cliftonville	0–0	Dunmurry
Distillery	3–1	Willowfield
Glentoran	2–1	Queen's Island
Larne	2–2	Barn
Linfield	4–1	Crusaders

==== Replay ====
Team 1	Score	Team 2
Barn	2–1	Larne
Dunmurry	1–1	Cliftonville

==== Second replay ====
Team 1	Score	Team 2
Dunmurry	1–2	Cliftonville

=== Quarter-finals ===
Team 1	Score	Team 2
Cliftonville	1–0	Distillery
Linfield	1–3	Glentoran
Bangor	bye	
Barn	bye	

=== Semi-finals ===
Team 1	Score	Team 2
Barn	1–0	Bangor
Cliftonville	3–1	Glentoran

=== Final ===
24 May 1924

Cliftonville	1–0 (a.e.t.)	Barn
Falloon 95'	Report

Solitude, Belfast
