= 1888–89 Belfast Charity Cup =

Tournament details
- Country: Ireland
- Date: 5 January 1889 – 13 April 1889
- Teams: 8

Final positions
- Champions: Cliftonville (5th win)
- Runners-up: Distillery

Tournament statistics
- Matches played: 6
- Goals scored: 40 (6.67 per match)

The 1888–89 Belfast Charity Cup was the 6th edition of the Belfast Charity Cup, a cup competition in Irish football.

Cliftonville won the tournament for the 5th time and 4th consecutive year, defeating Distillery 4–2 in the final. The final ended when Distillery walked off the field with 13 minutes remaining, apparently in protest at the officials' decisions. They requested a replay but this was rejected.

== Results ==
=== Quarter-finals ===
| Team 1 | Score | Team 2 |
|---|---|---|
| Belfast Athletics | 3–2 | YMCA |
| Cliftonville | w/o | Ulster |
| Distillery | 7–1 | Glentoran |
| Linfield | 12–0 | Oldpark |

=== Semi-finals ===
| Team 1 | Score | Team 2 |
|---|---|---|
| Cliftonville | 2–0 | Belfast Athletics |
| Distillery | 4–3 | Linfield |

=== Final ===
13 April 1889

| Cliftonville | 4–2 | Distillery |
|---|---|---|
| Elleman; Turner; Rosbotham | Report | Stanfield; Stewart |

Solitude, Belfast
