= 1931–32 Belfast Charity Cup =

Tournament details
- Country: Northern Ireland
- Teams: 8

Final positions
- Champions: Belfast Celtic (6th win)
- Runners-up: Linfield

Tournament statistics
- Matches played: 7
- Goals scored: 32 (4.57 per match)

The 1931–32 Belfast Charity Cup was the 49th edition of the Belfast Charity Cup, a cup competition in Northern Irish football.

Belfast Celtic won the title for the 6th time, defeating Linfield 2–0 in the final.

== Results ==
=== Quarter-finals ===
Team 1	Score	Team 2
Belfast Celtic	3–0	Dunmurry
Distillery	3–4	Crusaders
Glentoran	5–1	Brantwood
Linfield	3–2	Cliftonville

=== Semi-finals ===
Team 1	Score	Team 2
Belfast Celtic	5–1	Glentoran
Linfield	2–1	Crusaders

=== Final ===
17 May 1932

Belfast Celtic	2–0	Linfield
Coulter 30'; J. Donnelly 40'	Report

Solitude, Belfast
Referee: Mr S. Thompson
