= 1937–38 Belfast Charity Cup =

Tournament details
- Country: Northern Ireland
- Teams: 5

Final positions
- Champions: Linfield (24th win)
- Runners-up: Glentoran

Tournament statistics
- Matches played: 4
- Goals scored: 19 (4.75 per match)

The 1937–38 Belfast Charity Cup was the 55th edition of the Belfast Charity Cup, a cup competition in Northern Irish football.

Linfield won the tournament for the 24th time after defeating Glentoran 3–1 in the final.

== Results ==
=== Quarter-finals ===
Team 1	Score	Team 2
Distillery	2–4	Linfield
Belfast Celtic	bye	
Cliftonville	bye	
Glentoran	bye	

=== Semi-finals ===
Team 1	Score	Team 2
Glentoran	5–1	Cliftonville
Linfield	2–1	Belfast Celtic

=== Final ===
19 May 1938
19:30 GMT

Linfield	3–1	Glentoran
Marshall 5', 57', 63'	Report	Stitt 89'

Solitude, Belfast
Referee: Mr W. McClean
