= 1901–02 Belfast Charity Cup =

Tournament details
- Country: Ireland
- Date: 14 April 1902 – 26 April 1902
- Teams: 6

Final positions
- Champions: Glentoran (2nd win)
- Runners-up: Linfield

Tournament statistics
- Matches played: 6
- Goals scored: 16 (2.67 per match)

The 1901–02 Belfast Charity Cup was the 19th edition of the Belfast Charity Cup, a cup competition in Irish football.

Glentoran won the tournament for the 2nd time, defeating Linfield 2–0 in the final.

== Results ==
=== Quarter-finals ===
Team 1	Score	Team 2
Cliftonville	2–2	Ulster
Distillery	0–1	Belfast Celtic
Glentoran	bye	
Linfield	bye	

==== Replay ====
Team 1	Score	Team 2
Ulster	2–0	Cliftonville

=== Semi-finals ===
Team 1	Score	Team 2
Glentoran	3–1	Belfast Celtic
Linfield	2–1	Ulster

=== Final ===
26 April 1902

Glentoran	2–0	Linfield
Booth; McKelvey	Report

Solitude, Belfast
Referee: Mr W. Whiteside
