= 1910–11 Belfast Charity Cup =

Tournament details
- Country: Ireland
- Date: 10 April 1911 – 13 May 1911
- Teams: 5

Final positions
- Champions: Glentoran (4th win)
- Runners-up: Belfast Celtic

Tournament statistics
- Matches played: 4
- Goals scored: 19 (4.75 per match)

The 1910–11 Belfast Charity Cup was the 28th edition of the Belfast Charity Cup, a cup competition in Irish football.

Glentoran won the tournament for the 4th time, defeating Belfast Celtic 4–2 in the final.

== Results ==
=== Quarter-finals ===
Team 1	Score	Team 2
Distillery	0–1	Cliftonville
Belfast Celtic	bye	
Glentoran	bye	
Linfield	bye	

=== Semi-finals ===
Team 1	Score	Team 2
Belfast Celtic	3–2	Linfield
Glentoran	6–1	Cliftonville

=== Final ===
13 May 1911

Glentoran	4–2	Belfast Celtic
Mitchell; Napier	Report	Crothers (pen.); Weir

Solitude, Belfast
Referee: Mr H. Pollitt (Manchester)
