= 1914–15 Belfast Charity Cup =

Tournament details
- Country: Ireland
- Date: 14 April 1915 – 8 May 1915
- Teams: 5

Final positions
- Champions: Linfield (12th win)
- Runners-up: Belfast Celtic

Tournament statistics
- Matches played: 5
- Goals scored: 15 (3 per match)

The 1914–15 Belfast Charity Cup was the 32nd edition of the Belfast Charity Cup, a cup competition in Irish football.

Linfield won the tournament for the 12th time and 3rd consecutive year, defeating Belfast Celtic 1–0 in the final.

== Results ==
=== Quarter-finals ===
| Team 1 | Score | Team 2 |
|---|---|---|
| Cliftonville | 0–5 | Distillery |
| Belfast Celtic | bye | |
| Glentoran | bye | |
| Linfield | bye | |

=== Semi-finals ===
| Team 1 | Score | Team 2 |
|---|---|---|
| Belfast Celtic | 2–2 | Glentoran |
| Linfield | 2–0 | Distillery |

==== Replay ====
| Team 1 | Score | Team 2 |
|---|---|---|
| Belfast Celtic | 3–0 | Glentoran |

=== Final ===
8 May 1915

| Linfield | 1–0 | Belfast Celtic |
|---|---|---|
| Young 7' | Report |

Grosvenor Park, Belfast
Attendance: 8,000
Referee: Mr J. H. Alderson (Newton-le-Willows)
