= 1893–94 Belfast Charity Cup =

Tournament details
- Country: Ireland
- Date: 14 April 1884 – 28 April 1894
- Teams: 8

Final positions
- Champions: Linfield (4th win)
- Runners-up: Glentoran

Tournament statistics
- Matches played: 6
- Goals scored: 23 (3.83 per match)

The 1893–94 Belfast Charity Cup was the 11th edition of the Belfast Charity Cup, a cup competition in Irish football.

Linfield won the tournament for the 4th time and 4th consecutive year, defeating Glentoran 3–0 in the final.

== Results ==
=== Quarter-finals ===
| Team 1 | Score | Team 2 |
|---|---|---|
| Cliftonville | 3–2 | Ligoniel |
| Distillery | 3–0 | Linfield Swifts |
| Linfield | 4–0 | Celtic |
| Glentoran | w/o | Belview |

=== Semi-finals ===
| Team 1 | Score | Team 2 |
|---|---|---|
| Glentoran | 1–0 | Distillery |
| Linfield | 7–0 | Cliftonville |

=== Final ===
6 May 1893
15:30 GMT

| Linfield | 3–0 | Glentoran |
|---|---|---|
| Gaukrodger; S. Torrans (pen.); Williamson | Report |

Solitude, Belfast
Attendance: 5,000
Referee: Mr J. M. Small
