= 1904–05 Belfast Charity Cup =

Tournament details
- Country: Ireland
- Date: 10 April 1905 – 6 May 1905
- Teams: 5

Final positions
- Champions: Linfield (9th win)
- Runners-up: Glentoran

Tournament statistics
- Matches played: 5
- Goals scored: 9 (1.8 per match)

The 1904–05 Belfast Charity Cup was the 22nd edition of the Belfast Charity Cup, a cup competition in Irish football.

Linfield won the tournament for the 9th time, defeating Glentoran 2–0 in the final.

== Results ==
=== Quarter-finals ===
Team 1	Score	Team 2
Distillery	1–0	Cliftonville
Belfast Celtic	bye	
Glentoran	bye	
Linfield	bye	

=== Semi-finals ===
Team 1	Score	Team 2
Glentoran	1–1	Distillery
Linfield	1–0	Belfast Celtic

==== Replay ====
Team 1	Score	Team 2
Glentoran	2–1	Distillery

=== Final ===
6 May 1905

Linfield	2–0	Glentoran
Stewart; Jones	Report

Solitude, Belfast
Attendance: 4,000
Referee: Sergeant Crawford
