= 1925–26 Belfast Charity Cup =

Tournament details
- Country: Northern Ireland
- Teams: 8

Final positions
- Champions: Belfast Celtic (5th win); Glentoran (7th win)

Tournament statistics
- Matches played: 8
- Goals scored: 27 (3.38 per match)

The 1925–26 Belfast Charity Cup was the 43rd edition of the Belfast Charity Cup, a cup competition in Northern Irish football.

For the first time in competition history, the trophy was shared after Belfast Celtic and Glentoran drew 1–1 in the final. Although the final was scheduled to be replayed, no date could be found for the replay and it was decided to share the trophy.

== Results ==
=== Quarter-finals ===
Team 1	Score	Team 2
Belfast Celtic	2–1	Queen's Island
Cliftonville	1–2	Crusaders
Glentoran	2–1	Brantwood
Linfield	1–1	Distillery

==== Replay ====
Team 1	Score	Team 2
Distillery	3–2	Linfield

=== Semi-finals ===
Team 1	Score	Team 2
Belfast Celtic	4–2	Crusaders
Glentoran	2–1	Distillery

=== Final ===
15 May 1926

Belfast Celtic	1–1	Glentoran
Curran	Report	Bowden (pen.)

Solitude, Belfast
Referee: Mr J. B. Stark
