= 1912–13 Belfast Charity Cup =

Tournament details
- Country: Ireland
- Date: 23 April 1913 – 10 May 1913
- Teams: 6

Final positions
- Champions: Linfield (10th win)
- Runners-up: Belfast Celtic

Tournament statistics
- Matches played: 5
- Goals scored: 19 (3.8 per match)

The 1912–13 Belfast Charity Cup was the 30th edition of the Belfast Charity Cup, a cup competition in Irish football.

Linfield won the tournament for the 10th time, defeating Belfast Celtic 3–1 in the final.

== Results ==
=== Quarter-finals ===
Team 1	Score	Team 2
Distillery II	0–3	Belfast Celtic
Glentoran	4–1	Distillery
Cliftonville	bye	
Linfield	bye	

=== Semi-finals ===
Team 1	Score	Team 2
Belfast Celtic	2–1	Glentoran
Linfield	3–1	Cliftonville

=== Final ===
10 May 1913

Linfield	3–1	Belfast Celtic
Brown; McEwan; McCluskey	Report	Marshall

Solitude, Belfast
Referee: Mr Tom Robertson (Glasgow)
