= 1932–33 Belfast Charity Cup =

Tournament details
- Country: Northern Ireland
- Teams: 5

Final positions
- Champions: Linfield (20th win)
- Runners-up: Distillery

Tournament statistics
- Matches played: 4
- Goals scored: 25 (6.25 per match)

The 1932–33 Belfast Charity Cup was the 50th edition of the Belfast Charity Cup, a cup competition in Northern Irish football.

Linfield won the title for the 20th time, defeating Distillery 3–0 in the final.

== Results ==
=== Quarter-finals ===
Team 1	Score	Team 2
Cliftonville	2–6	Linfield
Belfast Celtic	bye	
Distillery	bye	
Glentoran	4–0	Crusaders

=== Semi-finals ===
Team 1	Score	Team 2
Distillery	4–3	Glentoran
Linfield	4–3	Belfast Celtic

=== Final ===
20 May 1933

Linfield	3–0	Distillery
Donnelly; Bambrick	Report

Solitude, Belfast
Referee: Mr S. Thompson
