= 1916–17 Belfast Charity Cup =

Tournament details
- Country: Ireland
- Date: 18 April 1917 – 5 May 1917
- Teams: 6

Final positions
- Champions: Linfield (13th win)
- Runners-up: Glentoran

Tournament statistics
- Matches played: 5
- Goals scored: 10 (2 per match)

The 1916–17 Belfast Charity Cup was the 34th edition of the Belfast Charity Cup, a cup competition in Irish football.

Linfield won the tournament for the 13th time, defeating Glentoran 1–0 in the final.

== Results ==
=== Quarter-finals ===
| Team 1 | Score | Team 2 |
|---|---|---|
| Belfast Celtic | 0–3 | Linfield |
| Belfast United | 1–1^{1} | Cliftonville |
| Distillery | bye | |
| Glentoran | bye | |

^{1}Belfast United won on corner kicks.

=== Semi-finals ===
| Team 1 | Score | Team 2 |
|---|---|---|
| Glentoran | 1–0 | Distillery |
| Linfield | 3–0 | Belfast United |

=== Final ===
5 May 1917

| Linfield | 1–0 | Glentoran |
|---|---|---|
| Campbell 6' | Report |

Solitude, Belfast
Attendance: 9,000
Referee: Mr Hugh Rogers
