= 1884–85 Belfast Charity Cup =

Tournament details
- Country: Ireland
- Date: 28 March 1885 – 25 April 1885
- Teams: 4

Final positions
- Champions: Oldpark (1st win)
- Runners-up: Cliftonville

Tournament statistics
- Matches played: 4
- Goals scored: 12 (3 per match)

The 1884–85 Belfast Charity Cup was the 2nd edition of the Belfast Charity Cup, a cup competition in Irish football.

Oldpark won the tournament for the 1st time, defeating Cliftonville 1–0 in the final.

== Results ==
=== Semi-finals ===
Team 1	Score	Team 2
Cliftonville	5–1	Ulster
Oldpark	2–2	Distillery

==== Replay ====
Team 1	Score	Team 2
Oldpark	1–0	Distillery

=== Final ===
25 April 1885

Oldpark	1–0	Cliftonville
	Report

Ulster Cricket Ground, Belfast
