= 1906–07 Belfast Charity Cup =

Tournament details
- Country: Ireland
- Date: 8 April 1907 – 27 April 1907
- Teams: 5

Final positions
- Champions: Glentoran (3rd win)
- Runners-up: Linfield

Tournament statistics
- Matches played: 4
- Goals scored: 13 (3.25 per match)

The 1906–07 Belfast Charity Cup was the 24th edition of the Belfast Charity Cup, a cup competition in Irish football.

Glentoran won the tournament for the 3rd time, defeating Linfield 2–0 in the final.

== Results ==
=== Quarter-finals ===
Team 1	Score	Team 2
Glentoran	2–1	Belfast Celtic
Cliftonville	bye	
Distillery	bye	
Linfield	bye	

=== Semi-finals ===
Team 1	Score	Team 2
Glentoran	1–0	Cliftonville
Linfield	6–1	Distillery

=== Final ===
27 April 1907

Glentoran	2–0	Linfield
Willis (o.g.); Andrews	Report

Solitude, Belfast
Attendance: 3,000
Referee: Mr Yates (Bolton)
