= 1894–95 Belfast Charity Cup =

Tournament details
- Country: Ireland
- Date: 20 April 1895 – 4 May 1895
- Teams: 7

Final positions
- Champions: Linfield (5th win)
- Runners-up: Cliftonville

Tournament statistics
- Matches played: 6
- Goals scored: 29 (4.83 per match)

The 1894–95 Belfast Charity Cup was the 12th edition of the Belfast Charity Cup, a cup competition in Irish football.

Linfield won the tournament for the 5th time and 5th consecutive year, defeating Cliftonville 3–1 in the final.

== Results ==
=== Quarter-finals ===
| Team 1 | Score | Team 2 |
|---|---|---|
| Cliftonville | 4–0 | Milltown |
| Glentoran | 2–3 | Distillery |
| Linfield | 7–0 | Ligoniel |
| Celtic | bye | |

=== Semi-finals ===
| Team 1 | Score | Team 2 |
|---|---|---|
| Cliftonville | 5–0 | Celtic |
| Linfield | 4–0 | Distillery |

=== Final ===
4 May 1895

| Linfield | 3–1 | Cliftonville |
|---|---|---|
| Gaukrodger; Williamson; Jordan | Report | Gibson |

Solitude, Belfast
Referee: Mr R. H. Kyle
