= 1898–99 Irish League =

Association football season, of 6 teams

Irish League
- Season: 1898–99
- Dates: 3 September 1898 – 21 January 1899
- Champions: Distillery; 2nd Irish title
- Matches: 30
- Goals: 106 (3.53 per match)
- Biggest home win: Cliftonville 4–0 Celtic
- Biggest away win: Celtic 1–6 Linfield
- Highest scoring: Celtic 1–6 Linfield; Distillery 4–3 North Staffs; North Staffs 3–4 Celtic; North Staffs 2–5 Distillery

The 1898–99 Irish League was the 9th edition of the Irish League, the highest level of league competition in Irish football.

The league comprised six teams, and Distillery won the championship for the second time after a play-off with Linfield.

== Teams and locations ==
Location of teams in the 1898–99 Irish League; all matches were played in Belfast

Team	Town	Home Ground
Celtic	Belfast	Celtic Park
Cliftonville	Belfast	Solitude
Distillery	Belfast	Grosvenor Park
Glentoran	Belfast	The Oval
Linfield	Belfast	Balmoral
North Staffordshire Regiment	No home ground	

== League standings ==
Pos	Team	Pld	W	D	L	GF	GA	GR	Pts	Result
1	Distillery (C)	10	7	1	2	23	17	1.353	15	Champions
2	Linfield	10	7	1	2	21	8	2.625	15	
3	Cliftonville	10	6	0	4	19	12	1.583	12	
4	Glentoran	10	6	0	4	17	12	1.417	12	
5	Celtic	10	2	2	6	15	25	0.600	6	
6	North Staffordshire Regiment	10	0	0	10	11	32	0.344	0	Withdrew

Source: rsssf.com
(C) Champions

== Results ==
=== League ===
Home \ Away	CEL	CLI	DIS	GLT	LIN	NSR
Celtic		1–2	1–2	2–3	1–6	2–0
Cliftonville	4–0		1–3	3–0	1–2	2–1
Distillery	3–3	2–1		0–2	2–1	4–3
Glentoran	2–1	1–2	1–2		1–2	3–0
Linfield	0–0	2–0	2–0	0–1		4–2
North Staffordshire	3–4	0–3	2–5	0–3	0–2	

Source: Irish League Archive
Legend: Blue = home team win; Yellow = draw; Red = away team win.

=== Test match ===
21 January 1899

Distillery	2–0	Linfield
Peden 43'; Wattie 75'	Report

Solitude, Belfast
