= 1913–14 Belfast Charity Cup =

Tournament details
- Country: Ireland
- Date: 20 April 1914 – 2 May 1914
- Teams: 5

Final positions
- Champions: Linfield (11th win)
- Runners-up: Glentoran

Tournament statistics
- Matches played: 5
- Goals scored: 14 (2.8 per match)

The 1913–14 Belfast Charity Cup was the 31st edition of the Belfast Charity Cup, a cup competition in Irish football.

Linfield won the tournament for the 11th time and 2nd consecutive year, defeating Glentoran 1–0 in the final.

== Results ==
=== Quarter-finals ===
Team 1	Score	Team 2
Distillery	2–2	Cliftonville
Belfast Celtic	bye	
Glentoran	bye	
Linfield	bye	

==== Replay ====
Team 1	Score	Team 2
Cliftonville	0–2	Distillery

=== Semi-finals ===
Team 1	Score	Team 2
Glentoran	3–1	Distillery
Linfield	2–1	Belfast Celtic

=== Final ===
2 May 1914

Linfield	1–0	Glentoran
Lyner	Report

Solitude, Belfast
