= 1908–09 Belfast Charity Cup =

Tournament details
- Country: Ireland
- Date: 7 April 1909 – 6 May 1909
- Teams: 5

Final positions
- Champions: Cliftonville (9th win)
- Runners-up: Distillery

Tournament statistics
- Matches played: 7
- Goals scored: 8 (1.14 per match)

The 1908–09 Belfast Charity Cup was the 26th edition of the Belfast Charity Cup, a cup competition in Irish football.

Cliftonville won the tournament for the 9th time and 2nd consecutive year, defeating Distillery 2–0 in the final replay, after the original final ended in a 0–0 draw.

== Results ==
=== Quarter-finals ===
Team 1	Score	Team 2
Cliftonville	2–0	Belfast Celtic
Distillery	bye	
Glentoran	bye	
Linfield	bye	

=== Semi-finals ===
Team 1	Score	Team 2
Cliftonville	0–0	Glentoran
Distillery	1–0	Linfield

==== Replay ====
Team 1	Score	Team 2
Cliftonville	1–1	Glentoran

==== Second replay ====
Team 1	Score	Team 2
Cliftonville	1–0	Glentoran

=== Final ===
1 May 1909

Cliftonville	0–0	Distillery
	Report

Solitude, Belfast
Attendance: 2,500
Referee: Bob Milne (Linfield)

==== Replay ====
6 May 1909
18:15 GMT

Cliftonville	2–0	Distillery
Thompson; Houghton	Report

Grosvenor Park, Belfast
Referee: Mr J. B. Hall (Bolton)
