= 1918–19 Belfast Charity Cup =

Tournament details
- Country: Ireland
- Date: 2 April 1919 – 3 May 1919
- Teams: 6

Final positions
- Champions: Linfield (15th win)
- Runners-up: Glentoran

Tournament statistics
- Matches played: 5
- Goals scored: 10 (2 per match)

The 1918–19 Belfast Charity Cup was the 36th edition of the Belfast Charity Cup, a cup competition in Irish football.

Linfield won the tournament for the 14th time and 3rd consecutive year, defeating Glentoran 1–0 in the final.

== Results ==
=== Quarter-finals ===
Team 1	Score	Team 2
Cliftonville	1–0	Distillery
Glentoran	3–0	Belfast United
Belfast Celtic	bye	
Linfield	bye	

=== Semi-finals ===
Team 1	Score	Team 2
Glentoran	3–0	Cliftonville
Linfield	2–0	Belfast Celtic

=== Final ===
3 May 1919

Linfield	1–0	Glentoran
Lindsay	Report

Solitude, Belfast
Referee: Mr J. Saunderson
