= 1934–35 Belfast Charity Cup =

Tournament details
- Country: Northern Ireland
- Teams: 5

Final positions
- Champions: Linfield (22nd win)
- Runners-up: Belfast Celtic

Tournament statistics
- Matches played: 5
- Goals scored: 22 (4.4 per match)

The 1934–35 Belfast Charity Cup was the 52nd edition of the Belfast Charity Cup, a cup competition in Northern Irish football.

Linfield won the title for the 22nd time and 3rd consecutive year, defeating Belfast Celtic 3–2 in the final replay, after the original final finished in a 1–1 draw.

Due to fixture congestion, the replay was unable to be played until May 1936. This tournament also saw the permanent awarding of the Jubilee Cup to the winner of the final, meaning Linfield won two trophies in a match.

== Results ==
=== Quarter-finals ===
Team 1	Score	Team 2
Distillery	2–5	Cliftonville
Belfast Celtic	bye	
Glentoran	bye	
Linfield	bye	

=== Semi-finals ===
Team 1	Score	Team 2
Belfast Celtic	2–1	Glentoran
Linfield	3–2	Cliftonville

=== Final ===
18 May 1935

Linfield	1–1	Belfast Celtic
McCleery	Report	Shiels

Solitude, Belfast
Referee: W. R. Hamilton

==== Replay ====
2 May 1936

Linfield	3–2	Belfast Celtic
Mawson	Report	Kelly; Feenan

Solitude, Belfast
