= 1883–84 Belfast Charity Cup =

Tournament details
- Country: Ireland
- Date: 26 April 1884 – 3 May 1884
- Teams: 4

Final positions
- Champions: Cliftonville (1st win)
- Runners-up: Distillery

Tournament statistics
- Matches played: 4
- Goals scored: 17 (4.25 per match)

The 1883–84 Belfast Charity Cup was the inaugural edition of the Belfast Charity Cup, a cup competition in Irish football.

Cliftonville won the tournament for the first time, defeating Distillery 2–0 in the final.

== Results ==
=== Semi-finals ===
Team 1	Score	Team 2
Ulster	1–1	Distillery
Wellington Park	1–7	Cliftonville

==== Replay ====
Team 1	Score	Team 2
Ulster	0–5	Distillery

=== Final ===
3 May 1884

Cliftonville	2–0	Distillery
Guiney; Dill	Report

Ulster Cricket Ground, Belfast
