= 1897–98 Belfast Charity Cup =

Tournament details
- Country: Ireland
- Date: 28 March 1898 – 23 April 1898
- Teams: 6

Final positions
- Champions: North Staffordshire Regiment (1st win)
- Runners-up: Glentoran

Tournament statistics
- Matches played: 6
- Goals scored: 18 (3 per match)

The 1897–98 Belfast Charity Cup was the 15th edition of the Belfast Charity Cup, a cup competition in Irish football.

North Staffordshire Regiment (a British Army team) won the tournament for the 1st time, defeating Glentoran 4–0 in the final.

== Results ==
=== Quarter-finals ===
Team 1	Score	Team 2
Cliftonville	1–1	Celtic
North Staffordshire Regiment	2–0	Distillery
Glentoran	bye	
Linfield	bye	

==== Replay ====
Team 1	Score	Team 2
Cliftonville	3–1	Celtic

=== Semi-finals ===
Team 1	Score	Team 2
Glentoran	2–1	Linfield
North Staffordshire Regiment	2–1	Cliftonville

=== Final ===
23 April 1898

North Staffordshire Regiment	4–0	Glentoran
Boyd; Ravenscroft; Langley; Jones	Report	Johnston (red card)

Solitude, Belfast
Referee: Mr M. Barron
