= 1891–92 Belfast Charity Cup =

Tournament details
- Country: Ireland
- Date: 23 April 1892 – 7 May 1892
- Teams: 6

Final positions
- Champions: Linfield (2nd win)
- Runners-up: Distillery

Tournament statistics
- Matches played: 5
- Goals scored: 21 (4.2 per match)

The 1891–92 Belfast Charity Cup was the 9th edition of the Belfast Charity Cup, a cup competition in Irish football.

Linfield won the tournament for the 2nd time and 2nd consecutive year, defeating Distillery 1–0 in the final.

== Results ==
=== Quarter-finals ===
Team 1	Score	Team 2
Linfield	4–0	Glentoran
Ulster	0–6	Cliftonville
Distillery	bye	
Lancashire Fusiliers	bye	

=== Semi-finals ===
Team 1	Score	Team 2
Distillery	2–1	Cliftonville
Linfield	6–1	Lancashire Fusiliers

=== Final ===
7 May 1892

Linfield	1–0	Distillery
Milne	Report

Solitude, Belfast
Attendance: 5,000
Referee: Mr J. Sinclair
