= 1896–97 Belfast Charity Cup =

Tournament details
- Country: Ireland
- Date: 10 April 1897 – 5 May 1897
- Teams: 4

Final positions
- Champions: Cliftonville (6th win)
- Runners-up: Distillery

Tournament statistics
- Matches played: 4
- Goals scored: 17 (4.25 per match)

The 1896–97 Belfast Charity Cup was the 14th edition of the Belfast Charity Cup, a cup competition in Irish football.

Cliftonville won the tournament for the 6th time, defeating Distillery 6–2 in the final replay, after the original final finished in a 1–1 draw.

== Results ==
=== Semi-finals ===
Team 1	Score	Team 2
Cliftonville	3–0	Linfield
Distillery	4–0	Glentoran

=== Final ===
24 April 1897
15:30 GMT

Cliftonville	1–1	Distillery
85'	Report	88'

Solitude, Belfast
Attendance: 5,000
Referee: Mr J. Torrans

==== Replay ====
5 May 1897

Cliftonville	6–2	Distillery
Pyper; McCashin; Martin; Barron	Report	McWilliams; Stanfield

Solitude, Belfast
Attendance: 5,000
Referee: Mr J. Torrans
