= 1930–31 Belfast Charity Cup =

Tournament details
- Country: Northern Ireland
- Teams: 8

Final positions
- Champions: Distillery (5th win)
- Runners-up: Belfast Celtic

Tournament statistics
- Matches played: 7
- Goals scored: 32 (4.57 per match)

The 1930–31 Belfast Charity Cup was the 48th edition of the Belfast Charity Cup, a cup competition in Northern Irish football.

Distillery won the title for the 5th time, defeating Belfast Celtic 4–2 in the final.

== Results ==
=== Quarter-finals ===
Team 1	Score	Team 2
Belfast Celtic	2–0	Linfield Rangers
Cliftonville	4–1	Broadway United
Distillery	3–2	Glentoran
Linfield	6–0	Crusaders

=== Semi-finals ===
Team 1	Score	Team 2
Belfast Celtic	2–1	Cliftonville
Distillery	3–2	Linfield

=== Final ===
16 May 1931

Distillery	4–2	Belfast Celtic
Thompson; McAdam	Report	Coulter

Grosvenor Park, Belfast
Referee: Mr W. McClean
