= 1907–08 Belfast Charity Cup =

Tournament details
- Country: Ireland
- Date: 30 March 1908 – 25 April 1908
- Teams: 5

Final positions
- Champions: Cliftonville (8th win)
- Runners-up: Linfield

Tournament statistics
- Matches played: 4
- Goals scored: 14 (3.5 per match)

The 1907–08 Belfast Charity Cup was the 25th edition of the Belfast Charity Cup, a cup competition in Irish football.

Cliftonville won the tournament for the 8th time, defeating Linfield 3–1 in the final.

== Results ==
=== Quarter-finals ===
Team 1	Score	Team 2
Belfast Celtic	3–1	Distillery
Cliftonville	bye	
Glentoran	bye	
Linfield	bye	

=== Semi-finals ===
Team 1	Score	Team 2
Cliftonville	0–0	Belfast Celtic
Linfield	2–1	Glentoran

==== Replay ====
Team 1	Score	Team 2
Cliftonville	2–1	Belfast Celtic

=== Final ===
25 April 1908

Cliftonville	3–1	Linfield
Macauley; Robertson	Report	Darling

Grosvenor Park, Belfast
