= 1919–20 Belfast Charity Cup =

Tournament details
- Country: Ireland
- Date: 20 April 1920 – 1 May 1920
- Teams: 5

Final positions
- Champions: Belfast Celtic (4th win)
- Runners-up: Distillery

Tournament statistics
- Matches played: 4
- Goals scored: 14 (3.5 per match)

The 1919–20 Belfast Charity Cup was the 37th edition of the Belfast Charity Cup, a cup competition in Irish football.

Belfast Celtic won the tournament for the 4th time, defeating Distillery 3–0 in the final.

== Results ==
=== Quarter-finals ===
Team 1	Score	Team 2
Cliftonville	2–2^{1}	Glentoran
Belfast Celtic	bye	
Distillery	bye	
Linfield	bye	

^{1}Cliftonville won on corner kicks.

=== Semi-finals ===
Team 1	Score	Team 2
Belfast Celtic	3–0	Cliftonville
Distillery	3–1	Linfield

=== Final ===
1 May 1920

Belfast Celtic	3–0	Distillery
Mulholland; Chambers	Report

Solitude, Belfast
