= 1905–06 Belfast Charity Cup =

Tournament details
- Country: Ireland
- Date: 29 January 1906 – 16 May 1906
- Teams: 4

Final positions
- Champions: Cliftonville (7th win)
- Runners-up: Distillery

Tournament statistics
- Matches played: 8
- Goals scored: 16 (2 per match)

The 1905–06 Belfast Charity Cup was the 23rd edition of the Belfast Charity Cup, a cup competition in Irish football.

Cliftonville won the tournament for the 7th time, defeating Distillery 2–0 in the final replay, after the original final ended in a 1–1 draw.

== Results ==
=== Quarter-finals ===
Team 1	Score	Team 2
Cliftonville	4-2	Glentoran
Belfast Celtic	bye	
Distillery	bye	
Linfield	bye	

=== Semi-finals ===
Team 1	Score	Team 2
Cliftonville	2–2	Belfast Celtic
Distillery	0–0	Linfield

==== Replays ====
Team 1	Score	Team 2
Cliftonville	1–0	Belfast Celtic
Distillery	1–1	Linfield

==== Second replay ====
Team 1	Score	Team 2
Distillery	1–1	Linfield

==== Third replay ====
Team 1	Score	Team 2
Distillery	2–1	Linfield

=== Final ===
5 May 1906

Cliftonville	1–1 (a.e.t.)	Distillery
Hall 104'	Report	Burnison 93'

Solitude, Belfast
Attendance: 3,000
Referee: Mr F. Kirkham (Preston)

==== Replay ====
16 May 1906

Cliftonville	2–0	Distillery
McIlroy; Robertson	Report

Grosvenor Park, Belfast
Referee: Mr R. S. Lithgow (Glasgow)
