= 1903–04 Belfast Charity Cup =

Tournament details
- Country: Ireland
- Date: 13 April 1904 – 30 April 1904
- Teams: 5

Final positions
- Champions: Belfast Celtic (1st win)
- Runners-up: Glentoran

Tournament statistics
- Matches played: 5
- Goals scored: 6 (1.2 per match)

The 1903–04 Belfast Charity Cup was the 21st edition of the Belfast Charity Cup, a cup competition in Irish football.

Belfast Celtic won the tournament for the 1st time, defeating Glentoran 1–0 in the final.

== Results ==
=== Quarter-finals ===
Team 1	Score	Team 2
Belfast Celtic	3–0	Cliftonville
Distillery	bye	
Glentoran	bye	
Linfield	bye	

=== Semi-finals ===
Team 1	Score	Team 2
Belfast Celtic	0–0	Distillery
Glentoran	1–0	Linfield

==== Replay ====
Team 1	Score	Team 2
Belfast Celtic	1–0	Distillery

=== Final ===
30 April 1904

Belfast Celtic	1–0	Glentoran
Soye 40'	Report

Solitude, Belfast
Attendance: 5,000
Referee: Mr J. Deans (Dalkeith)
