= 1920–21 Belfast Charity Cup =

Tournament details
- Country: Ireland
- Date: 12 April 1921 – 7 May 1921
- Teams: 8

Final positions
- Champions: Distillery (3rd win)
- Runners-up: Glentoran

Tournament statistics
- Matches played: 7
- Goals scored: 16 (2.29 per match)

The 1920–21 Belfast Charity Cup was the 38th edition of the Belfast Charity Cup, a cup competition in Irish football.

Distillery won the tournament for the 3rd time, defeating Glentoran 2–0 in the final.

== Results ==
=== Quarter-finals ===
Team 1	Score	Team 2
Cliftonville	0–1	Brantwood
Linfield	1–2	Belfast United
Glentoran	5–0	Forth River
Queen's Island	1–1^{1}	Distillery

^{1}Distillery won on penalty kicks.

=== Semi-finals ===
Team 1	Score	Team 2
Distillery	1–0	Brantwood
Glentoran	1–1^{1}	Belfast United

^{1}Although the game finished in a draw, it was not replayed and Glentoran advanced to the final.

=== Final ===
7 May 1921

Distillery	2–0	Glentoran
Dalrymple	Report

Solitude, Belfast
Attendance: 3,000
Referee: Mr W. Moore
