= 1899–1900 Belfast Charity Cup =

Tournament details
- Country: Ireland
- Date: 4 April 1900 – 28 April 1900
- Teams: 5

Final positions
- Champions: Distillery (1st win)
- Runners-up: Linfield

Tournament statistics
- Matches played: 6
- Goals scored: 11 (1.83 per match)

The 1899–1900 Belfast Charity Cup was the 17th edition of the Belfast Charity Cup, a cup competition in Irish football.

Distillery won the tournament for the 1st time, defeating Linfield 5–0 in the final.

== Results ==
=== Quarter-finals ===
Team 1	Score	Team 2
Cliftonville	2–0	Glentoran
Celtic	bye	
Distillery	bye	
Linfield	bye	

=== Semi-finals ===
Team 1	Score	Team 2
Celtic	1–1	Distillery
Cliftonville	0–0	Linfield

==== Replays ====
Team 1	Score	Team 2
Distillery	1–0	Celtic
Linfield	1–0	Cliftonville

=== Final ===
28 April 1900
15:30 GMT

Distillery	5–0	Linfield
Magill; Worrall; Smyth; Kearns	Report

Solitude, Belfast
Attendance: 5,000
Referee: Sam Martin
