= 1938–39 Belfast Charity Cup =

Tournament details
- Country: Northern Ireland
- Teams: 5

Final positions
- Champions: Belfast Celtic (9th win)
- Runners-up: Linfield

Tournament statistics
- Matches played: 4
- Goals scored: 18 (4.5 per match)

The 1938–39 Belfast Charity Cup was the 56th edition of the Belfast Charity Cup, a cup competition in Northern Irish football.

Belfast Celtic won the tournament for the 9th time after defeating Linfield 1–0 in the final.

== Results ==
=== Quarter-finals ===
Team 1	Score	Team 2
Glentoran	5–4	Distillery
Belfast Celtic	bye	
Cliftonville	bye	
Linfield	bye	

=== Semi-finals ===
Team 1	Score	Team 2
Belfast Celtic	4–1	Cliftonville
Linfield	2–1	Glentoran

=== Final ===
20 May 1939

Belfast Celtic	1–0	Linfield
Kernaghan	Report

Solitude, Belfast
Referee: Mr D. Maxwell (Belfast)
