= 1915–16 Belfast Charity Cup =

Tournament details
- Country: Ireland
- Date: 12 April 1916 – 29 April 1916
- Teams: 6

Final positions
- Champions: Distillery (2nd win)
- Runners-up: Linfield

Tournament statistics
- Matches played: 6
- Goals scored: 10 (1.67 per match)

The 1915–16 Belfast Charity Cup was the 33rd edition of the Belfast Charity Cup, a cup competition in Irish football.

Distillery won the tournament for the 2nd time, defeating Linfield 1–0 in the final.

== Results ==
=== Quarter-finals ===
Team 1	Score	Team 2
Belfast Celtic	0–1	Belfast United
Cliftonville	0–2	Distillery
Glentoran	bye	
Linfield	bye	

=== Semi-finals ===
Team 1	Score	Team 2
Distillery	0–0	Belfast United
Linfield	2–0	Glentoran

==== Replay ====
Team 1	Score	Team 2
Distillery	4–0	Belfast United

=== Final ===
29 April 1916

Distillery	1–0	Linfield
Ferris	Report

Solitude, Belfast
Attendance: 14,000
Referee: Mr Cowan
