= 1935–36 Belfast Charity Cup =

Tournament details
- Country: Northern Ireland
- Teams: 5

Final positions
- Champions: Linfield (23rd win); Belfast Celtic (7th win)

Tournament statistics
- Matches played: 4
- Goals scored: 17 (4.25 per match)

The 1935–36 Belfast Charity Cup was the 53rd edition of the Belfast Charity Cup, a cup competition in Northern Irish football.

Linfield and Belfast Celtic shared the trophy, after drawing 2–2 in the final.

== Results ==
=== Quarter-finals ===
Team 1	Score	Team 2
Cliftonville	3–2	Distillery
Belfast Celtic	bye	
Glentoran	bye	
Linfield	bye	

=== Semi-finals ===
Team 1	Score	Team 2
Belfast Celtic	5–0	Glentoran
Linfield	2–1	Cliftonville

=== Final ===
16 May 1936

Linfield	2–2	Belfast Celtic
Baird; Donnelly	Report	Higgins; Bruce

Solitude, Belfast
