= 1909–10 Belfast Charity Cup =

Tournament details
- Country: Ireland
- Date: 13 April 1910 – 18 May 1910
- Teams: 5

Final positions
- Champions: Belfast Celtic (2nd win)
- Runners-up: Distillery

Tournament statistics
- Matches played: 5
- Goals scored: 10 (2 per match)

The 1909–10 Belfast Charity Cup was the 27th edition of the Belfast Charity Cup, a cup competition in Irish football.

Belfast Celtic won the tournament for the 2nd time, defeating Distillery 2–1 in the final replay, after the original final ended in a 2–2 draw.

== Results ==
=== Quarter-finals ===
Team 1	Score	Team 2
Distillery	1–0	Glentoran
Belfast Celtic	bye	
Cliftonville	bye	
Linfield	bye	

=== Semi-finals ===
Team 1	Score	Team 2
Belfast Celtic	1–0	Linfield
Distillery	1–0	Cliftonville

=== Final ===
14 May 1910

Belfast Celtic	2–2 (a.e.t.)	Distillery
Briggs 86'; Crothers 93' (pen.)	Report	McCracken 80', 99'

Solitude, Belfast
Attendance: 6,000
Referee: Mr Dennison (Middlesbrough)

==== Replay ====
18 May 1910
18:30 GMT

Belfast Celtic	2–1	Distillery
Davidson	Report	Hamilton

Grosvenor Park, Belfast
Referee: Mr J. B. Stark (Airdrie)
