= 1895–96 Belfast Charity Cup =

Tournament details
- Country: Ireland
- Date: 18 April 1896 – 2 May 1896
- Teams: 4

Final positions
- Champions: Glentoran (1st win)
- Runners-up: Cliftonville

Tournament statistics
- Matches played: 3
- Goals scored: 9 (3 per match)

The 1895–96 Belfast Charity Cup was the 13th edition of the Belfast Charity Cup, a cup competition in Irish football.

Glentoran won the tournament for the 1st time, defeating Cliftonville 1–0 in the final.

== Results ==
=== Semi-finals ===
Team 1	Score	Team 2
Cliftonville	1–0	Linfield
Glentoran	4–3	Distillery

=== Final ===
2 May 1896

Glentoran	1–0	Cliftonville
Johnston 44'	Report

Solitude, Belfast
