= 1928–29 Belfast Charity Cup =

Tournament details
- Country: Northern Ireland
- Teams: 8

Final positions
- Champions: Distillery (4th win); Glentoran (8th win)

Tournament statistics
- Matches played: 7
- Goals scored: 39 (5.57 per match)

The 1928–29 Belfast Charity Cup was the 46th edition of the Belfast Charity Cup, a cup competition in Northern Irish football.

Distillery and Glentoran shared the title, after drawing 3–3 in the final.

== Results ==
=== Quarter-finals ===
Team 1	Score	Team 2
Belfast Celtic	0–5	Linfield
Cliftonville	4–2	Queen's Island
Distillery	4–2	Crusaders
Glentoran	5–2	Broadway United

=== Semi-finals ===
Team 1	Score	Team 2
Distillery	2–1	Linfield
Glentoran	4–2	Cliftonville

=== Final ===
18 May 1929

Distillery	3–3	Glentoran
Thompson; McAdam	Report	McKeague; Roberts; Hutchinson

Solitude, Belfast
Referee: Mr A. Rea
