= 1911–12 Belfast Charity Cup =

Tournament details
- Country: Ireland
- Date: 25 March 1912 – 11 May 1912
- Teams: 5

Final positions
- Champions: Belfast Celtic (3rd win)
- Runners-up: Distillery

Tournament statistics
- Matches played: 5
- Goals scored: 14 (2.8 per match)

The 1910–11 Belfast Charity Cup was the 29th edition of the Belfast Charity Cup, a cup competition in Irish football.

Belfast Celtic won the tournament for the 3rd time, defeating Distillery 3–0 in the final.

Due to a dispute the other clubs had with the Irish Football Association, Linfield competed in this tournament under the name Belfast Blues.

== Results ==
=== Quarter-finals ===
Team 1	Score	Team 2
Cliftonville	2–3	Belfast Blues
Belfast Celtic	bye	
Distillery	bye	
Glentoran	bye	

=== Semi-finals ===
Team 1	Score	Team 2
Distillery	2–0	Belfast Blues
Belfast Celtic	0–0	Glentoran

==== Replay ====
Team 1	Score	Team 2
Belfast Celtic	3–1	Glentoran

=== Final ===
11 May 1912

Belfast Celtic	3–0	Distillery
Grant; Buckle; Norwood	Report

Solitude, Belfast
Attendance: 12,000
Referee: Mr H. Pollitt (Manchester)
