= 1936–37 Belfast Charity Cup =

Tournament details
- Country: Northern Ireland
- Teams: 5

Final positions
- Champions: Belfast Celtic (8th win)
- Runners-up: Distillery

Tournament statistics
- Matches played: 4
- Goals scored: 13 (3.25 per match)

The 1936–37 Belfast Charity Cup was the 54th edition of the Belfast Charity Cup, a cup competition in Northern Irish football.

Belfast Celtic won the tournament after defeating Distillery 1–0 in the final.

== Results ==
=== Quarter-finals ===
Team 1	Score	Team 2
Linfield Swifts	1–2	Cliftonville
Belfast Celtic	bye	
Distillery	bye	
Glentoran	bye	

=== Semi-finals ===
Team 1	Score	Team 2
Belfast Celtic	3–1	Cliftonville
Distillery	4–1	Glentoran

=== Final ===
15 May 1937

Belfast Celtic	1–0	Distillery
Kelly	Report

Solitude, Belfast
Referee: Mr W. McClean
