= 1939–40 Belfast Charity Cup =

Tournament details
- Country: Northern Ireland
- Teams: 5

Final positions
- Champions: Belfast Celtic (10th win)
- Runners-up: Glentoran

Tournament statistics
- Matches played: 4
- Goals scored: 19 (4.75 per match)

The 1939–40 Belfast Charity Cup was the 57th and final edition of the Belfast Charity Cup, a cup competition in Northern Irish football.

Belfast Celtic won the tournament for the 10th time after defeating Glentoran 3–0 in the final.

The following year, instead of the tournament being played, Belfast Celtic played a representative match against players with cross-channel experience. The representative team won 3–1.

== Results ==
=== Quarter-finals ===
Team 1	Score	Team 2
Belfast Celtic	4–2	Distillery
Cliftonville	bye	
Glentoran	bye	
Linfield	bye	

=== Semi-finals ===
Team 1	Score	Team 2
Belfast Celtic	3–0	Linfield
Glentoran	5–2	Cliftonville

=== Final ===
18 May 1940

Belfast Celtic	3–0	Glentoran
O'Connor; Kernaghan; Nelson	Report

Solitude, Belfast
Referee: Mr John McIlveen
