= North Staffordshire Regiment F.C. =

Former association football club in Northern Ireland

- Full name: North Staffordshire Regiment Football Club
- Nickname(s): the Staffords
- Ground: none
- League: Irish Football League
Home colours

The North Staffordshire Regiment Football Club was the association football team of the 2nd battalion of the North Staffordshire Regiment.

== History ==
While deployed at the Victoria Barracks, Belfast the team played in the Irish Football League for three seasons from 1896 until 1899. A regimental team also won the Munster Senior Cup in 1911–12.

The club's greatest honour was winning the Belfast Charity Cup in 1897–98, beating Cliftonville and Distillery en route to the final, at Solitude, where the club hammered Glentoran 4–0; Glentoran resorted to trying to kick the Staffords off the park and Glen's Johnston was sent off.

== Colours ==
The club wore all black.

== Honours ==
- Belfast Charity Cup: 1
  - 1897–98
- Irish Army Cup: 1
  - 1897–98
- Munster Senior Cup
  - 1911–12
