= Steel & Sons Cup =

- Organiser(s): County Antrim & District F.A.
- Founded: 1895
- Region: Northern Ireland (since 1921); Ireland (1895–1921)
- Current champions: Ballymacash Rangers (1st title)
- Most championships: Glentoran II (13 titles)
- 2025–26 Steel & Sons Cup

The Steel & Sons Cup (also referred to as the Steel Cup) is an intermediate football competition in Northern Ireland run by the North East Ulster Football Association (also known as the County Antrim & District Football Association).

The competition culminates in the final which has traditionally been played on 25 December (except when this date falls on a Sunday). The 2006 final, however, broke with tradition when it was staged on the Saturday before 25 December as this was a closed date for all other football fixtures in Northern Ireland. The final returned to its original Christmas Day slot in 2007-08. The 2012–13 tournament was declared null after Glentoran II were stripped of their title having fielded an ineligible player in an earlier round. This is the first time in the tournament's history that no winner was declared.

The current holders are Ballymacash Rangers, who won their first title in 2025.

== The trophy ==
The "Steel Cup" trophy was donated to the County Antrim FA in 1895 by Mr David Steel. Steel was principal of Steel & Sons Ltd, wholesale jewellers, silversmiths, cutlers, watch-makers and opticians, with premises on Royal Avenue, Belfast.

Since 1973 a second trophy has been awarded after the final - the Player of the Match Award. Initially sponsored by the Sunday News, the first winner was Tommy Craig of Glentoran II. Since the 1993 final the award has been sponsored by the Belfast News Letter.

== Venue of final ==
The home for the final was rotated round the major Irish League venues in Belfast until the late 1950s when Solitude became the regular venue. Since the 1972-73 season Seaview, home of Crusaders, has hosted all the final ties, with the exception of the final and replay in 1975-76 and the replay of the 1984-85 final, which were played at Solitude.

== Past finals ==
Key:

	Scores level after 90 minutes. A replay was required.
(a.e.t.)	Scores level after extra time. A replay was required.
(a.e.t.)	Scores level after 90 minutes. Winner was decided in extra time with no penalty shootout required.
(p)	Scores level after extra time. A penalty shootout was required to determine the winner.

Season	Winners	Score	Runners-up	Venue	Notes
1895–96	Linfield Swifts	4–2	Cliftonville Olympic	Grosvenor Park
1896–97	Wesley	2–1	Glentoran II	Solitude
1897–98	Dunmurry	2–0	Ligoniel	Grosvenor Park
1898–99	Linfield Swifts	1–0	Belfast Celtic II	Grosvenor Park
1899–1900	Cliftonville Olympic	3–0	Belfast Celtic II	Grosvenor Park
1900–01	Distillery West End	5–0	Larne	Solitude
1901–02	Cliftonville Olympic	5–3	Distillery II	Grosvenor Park
1902–03	Highfield	2–0	Mountpottinger YMCA	Solitude
1903–04	Mountpottinger YMCA	4–2	Linfield Swifts	Grosvenor Park
1904–05	Glentoran II	1–1	Woodvale	Grosvenor Park
Replay	Glentoran II	1–1	Woodvale	Grosvenor Park
2nd replay	Glentoran II	1–2	Woodvale	Grosvenor Park	Annulled after protest
3rd replay	Glentoran II	A–A	Woodvale	Grosvenor Park	Abandoned due to snow
4th replay	Glentoran II	1–0	Woodvale	Solitude
1905–06	Mountpottinger YMCA	6–0	Parkside Rovers	Grosvenor Park
1906–07	Cliftonville Olympic	4–0	Parkside Rovers	Grosvenor Park
1907–08	Cliftonville Olympic	2–0	Barn	Grosvenor Park	Game 1 annulled after protest.
Replay	Cliftonville Olympic	3–0	Barn	Grosvenor Park
1908–09	Glentoran II	3–2	Larne	Grosvenor Park
1909–10	Larne	2–0	Oldpark Corinthians	Windsor Park
1910–11	Glentoran II	1–1	King's Own Scottish Borderers	Grosvenor Park
Replay	Glentoran II	2–1	King's Own Scottish Borderers	Solitude
1911–12	Black Diamonds	3–1	Ollardale	Balmoral Showgrounds
1912–13	Belfast Celtic II	3–1	Glentoran II	Grosvenor Park
1913–14	Cliftonville Olympic	4–1	Barn	Grosvenor Park
1914–15	Glentoran II	1–1	Belfast Celtic II	Windsor Park
Replay	Glentoran II	1–0	Belfast Celtic II	Solitude
1915–16	Linfield Swifts	0–0	Glentoran II	Solitude
Replay	Linfield Swifts	1–1	Glentoran II	Celtic Park
2nd replay	Linfield Swifts	2–0	Glentoran II	Celtic Park
1916–17	Belfast Celtic II	2–0	Distillery II	The Oval
1917–18	Belfast Celtic II	1–0	Glentoran	Windsor Park
1918–19	Glentoran II	1–1	Distillery II	Solitude
Replay	Glentoran II	2–0	Distillery II	Celtic Park
1919–20	Dunmurry	0–0	Brantwood	Grosvenor Park
Replay	Dunmurry	1–0	Brantwood	Grosvenor Park
1920–21	Brantwood	1–0	Bangor	The Oval
1921–22	Cliftonville Olympic	1–1	Dundela	Windsor Park
Replay	Cliftonville Olympic	1–1	Dundela	Windsor Park
2nd replay	Cliftonville Olympic	2–1	Dundela	Windsor Park
1922–23	Crusaders	2–2	Bangor	Solitude
Replay	Crusaders	0–0	Bangor	Solitude
2nd replay	Crusaders	3–1 (a.e.t.)	Bangor	Solitude
1923–24	Bangor	1–1	Woodburn	The Oval
Replay	Bangor	2–0	Woodburn	The Oval
1924–25	Ormiston	0–0	Ballyclare Comrades	Windsor Park
Replay	Ormiston	0–0	Ballyclare Comrades	Windsor Park
2nd replay	Ormiston	1–0	Ballyclare Comrades	Windsor Park
1925–26	St. Mary's	4–0	Summerfield	Solitude
1926–27	Crusaders	5–3 (a.e.t.)	Dunmurry Recreation	Celtic Park
1927–28	Willowfield	0–0	Ormiston	The Oval
Replay	Willowfield	2–1	Ormiston	The Oval
1928–29	Crusaders	4–0	Broadway United	Windsor Park
1929–30	Broadway United	2–2	Linfield Rangers	Solitude
Replay	Broadway United	5–0	Linfield Rangers	Solitude
1930–31	Crusaders	3–3	Charleville	The Oval
Replay	Crusaders	3–1	Charleville	The Oval
1931–32	Brantwood	3–0	Dunmurry Recreation	Celtic Park
1932–33	Glentoran II	2–2	Belfast Celtic II	Grosvenor Park
Replay	Glentoran II	3–1	Belfast Celtic II	Grosvenor Park
1933–34	Crusaders	3–1	Belfast Celtic II	Solitude
1934–35	Belfast Celtic II	3–2	Crusaders	Windsor Park
1935–36	Belfast Celtic II	1–1	Glentoran II	Solitude
Replay	Belfast Celtic II	2–1	Glentoran II	Solitude
1936–37	Crusaders	3–1	Glentoran II	Celtic Park
1937–38	Glentoran II	2–1	Summerfield	Grosvenor Park
1938–39	Sirocco Works	2–1	Crusaders	The Oval
1939–40	Linfield Swifts	2–0	Crusaders	Grosvenor Park
1940–41	Bangor Reserves	2–1	Distillery II	Solitude
1941–42	Larne Olympic	2–1	Belfast Celtic II	Windsor Park
1942–43	Larne Olympic	4–1	Victoria Works United	Celtic Park
1943–44	Ballyclare Comrades	4–2	Glentoran II	Solitude
1944–45	Bangor Reserves	3–0	Larne Olympic	Windsor Park
1945–46	Dundela	0–0	Bangor Reserves	Celtic Park
Replay	Dundela	3–1	Bangor Reserves	Celtic Park
1946–47	Linfield Swifts	4–1	Crusaders	Solitude
1947–48	Crusaders	2–2	Larne	Celtic Park
Replay	Crusaders	3–2	Larne	Celtic Park
1948–49	Linfield Swifts	6–2	Brantwood	Solitude
1949–50	Albert Foundry	3–2	Crusaders Reserves	Grosvenor Park
1950–51	Brantwood	2–1	Ballymoney United	The Oval
1951–52	Brantwood	2–0	Feltville United	Windsor Park
1952–53	Brantwood	2–1	Larne	The Oval
1953–54	Crusaders Reserves	4–3	Linfield Swifts	Solitude
1954–55	East Belfast	5–0	Dundela	Grosvenor Park
1955–56	Brantwood	2–0	Carrick Rangers	Windsor Park
1956–57	Larne	2–2	Linfield Swifts	Grosvenor Park
Replay	Larne	3–1	Linfield Swifts	Grosvenor Park
1957–58	Glentoran II	3–0	Larne	Solitude
1958–59	Larne	2–1	Crusaders Reserves	Grosvenor Park
1959–60	Larne	1–0	Ards II	Solitude
1960–61	Ballyclare Comrades	4–3	Dundela	The Oval
1961–62	Carrick Rangers	2–2	Ballymena Utd Reserves	Solitude
Replay	Carrick Rangers	1–0	Ballymena Utd Reserves	Grosvenor Park
1962–63	Chimney Corner	2–1	Dundela	Solitude
1963–64	Dundela	1–1	Larne	Solitude
Replay	Dundela	4–1	Larne	Solitude
1964–65	Larne	2–0	Brantwood	Grosvenor Park
1965–66	Glentoran II	1–0	Larne	Solitude
1966–67	Glentoran II	4–0	Ards II	Solitude
1967–68	Carrick Rangers	3–1	Dundela	Solitude
1968–69	Larne	3–1	Glentoran II	Grosvenor Park
1969–70	Larne	3–1	Ballyclare Comrades	Solitude
1970–71	Larne	1–1	Dundonald	Solitude
Replay	Larne	3–1	Dundonald	Solitude
1971–72	Larne	1–0	Dundela	Solitude
1972–73	Linfield Swifts	2–1	Dundela	Seaview
1973–74	Chimney Corner	2–0	Glentoran II	Seaview
1974–75	Ballyclare Comrades	1–0	Glentoran II	Seaview
1975–76	Chimney Corner	1–1	Ballyclare Comrades	Seaview
Replay	Chimney Corner	5–2	Ballyclare Comrades	Solitude
1976–77	Brantwood	2–0	Ards II	Seaview
1977–78	Downpatrick Rec.	1–1	Ballyclare Comrades	Seaview
Replay	Downpatrick Rec.	3–1	Ballyclare Comrades	Seaview
1978–79	Cromac Albion	2–2	Ballyclare Comrades	Seaview
Replay	Cromac Albion	4–1	Ballyclare Comrades	Seaview
1979–80	Short Bros	2–0	Barn United	Seaview
1980–81	Dundela	3–1	Killyleagh YC	Seaview
1981–82	Ballyclare Comrades	2–2	Killyleagh YC	Seaview
Replay	Ballyclare Comrades	3–2	Killyleagh YC	Seaview
1982–83	Dundela	2–0	RUC	Seaview
1983–84	Linfield Swifts	2–1	Ballymena United Reserves	Seaview
1984–85	Ballyclare Comrades	1–1	Distillery II	Seaview
Replay	Ballyclare Comrades	1–0	Distillery II	Solitude
1985–86	Brantwood	1–1	Ballymoney United	Seaview
Replay	Brantwood	5–1	Ballymoney United	Seaview
1986–87	Ballyclare Comrades	3–0	Killyleagh YC	Seaview
1987–88	Dundela	1–1	Linfield Swifts	Seaview
Replay	Dundela	1–0	Linfield Swifts	Seaview
1988–89	Dundela	2–1	Glentoran II	Seaview
1989–90	Glentoran II	4–1	East Belfast	Seaview
1990–91	Dundela	2–0	RUC	Seaview
1991–92	Comber Recreation	4–1	Brantwood	Seaview
1992–93	East Belfast	1–0	Linfield Swifts	Seaview
1993–94	RUC	5–1	Dundela	Seaview
1994–95	Bangor Reserves	1–0	Linfield Swifts	Seaview
1995–96	Ballymena United Reserves	1–1	Dromara Village	Seaview
Replay	Ballymena United Reserves	2–1	Dromara Village	Seaview
1996–97	Chimney Corner	2–1	Comber Recreation	Seaview
1997–98	Linfield Swifts	1–0 (a.e.t.)	Dundela	Seaview	Match decided by golden goal
1998–99	Dunmurry Recreation	2–0	RUC	Seaview
1999–2000	Dundela	3–2	Comber Recreation	Seaview
2000–01	Glentoran II	2–1 (a.e.t.)	Cliftonville Olympic	Seaview	Match decided by golden goal
2001–02	Glentoran II	2–2 (a.e.t.) (4–2 p)	Dundela	Seaview
2002–03	Killyleagh YC	1–0	Chimney Corner	Seaview
2003–04	Donegal Celtic	3–0	Killyleagh YC	Seaview
2004–05	Bangor	2–0	Glentoran II	Seaview	Original game abandoned due to snow
2005–06	Crusaders	4–1	Dundela	Seaview
2006–07	Brantwood	4–3 (a.e.t.)	Harland & Wolff Welders	Seaview
2007–08	Dundela	2–0	Ballyclare Comrades	Seaview
2008–09	Ards	2–1	Carrick Rangers	Seaview
2009–10	Kilmore Recreation	2–0	Downpatrick	Seaview	First final played on an artificial pitch
2010–11	Harland & Wolff Welders	3–1	Knockbreda	Seaview
2011–12	Bangor	2–1	Larne	Seaview
2012–13	Cup withheld. Glentoran II beat Ards 2–1 in the final, but were later disqualified for fielding an ineligible player in an earlier round.
2013–14	Dundela	4–1	Immaculata	Seaview
2014–15	Carrick Rangers	4–1	Harland & Wolff Welders	Seaview
2015–16	Harland & Wolff Welders	1–1 (a.e.t.) (4–1 p)	Albert Foundry	Seaview
2016–17	Linfield Swifts	3–1	Dundela	Seaview
2017–18	Newington	1–0	Linfield Swifts	Seaview
2018–19	East Belfast	3–0	Sirocco Works	Seaview
2019–20	Linfield Swifts	3–1	Newington	Seaview
2021–22	Newington	1–0	Linfield Swifts	Seaview
2022–23	Bangor	2–1	Dunmurry Recreation	Seaview
2023–24	Comber Recreation	3–2 (a.e.t.)	Crumlin Star	Seaview
2024–25	Derriaghy Cricket Club	1–0	Willowbank	Seaview
2025–26	Ballymacash Rangers	1–1 (a.e.t.) (4–2 p)	Holywood	Seaview

== Performance by club ==
Club	Winners	Winning years
Glentoran II	13	1904–05, 1908–09, 1910–11, 1914–15, 1918–19, 1932–33, 1937–38, 1957–58, 1965–66, 1966–67, 1989–90, 2000–01, 2001–02
Linfield Swifts	11	1895–96, 1898–99, 1915–16, 1939–40, 1946–47, 1948–49, 1972–73, 1983–84, 1997–98, 2016–17, 2019–20
Dundela	10	1945–46, 1963–64, 1980–81, 1982–83, 1987–88, 1988–89, 1990–91, 1999–2000, 2007–08, 2013–14
Larne	9	1909–10, 1956–57, 1958–59, 1959–60, 1964–65, 1968–69, 1969–70, 1970–71, 1971–72
Brantwood	9	1920–21, 1931–32, 1950–51, 1951–52, 1952–53, 1955–56, 1976–77, 1985–86, 2006–07
Crusaders	8	1922–23, 1926–27, 1928–29, 1930–31, 1933–34, 1936–37, 1947–48, 2005–06
Ballyclare Comrades	6	1943–44, 1960–61, 1974–75, 1981–82, 1984–85, 1986–87
Cliftonville Olympic	6	1899–1900, 1901–02, 1906–07, 1907–08, 1913–14, 1921–22
Belfast Celtic II	5	1912–13, 1916–17, 1917–18, 1934–35, 1935–36
Chimney Corner	4	1962–63, 1973–74, 1975–76, 1996–97
Bangor	4	1923–24, 2004–05, 2011–12, 2022–23
Carrick Rangers	3	1961–62, 1967–68, 2014–15
Dunmurry Recreation	3	1897–98, 1919–20, 1998–99
Bangor Reserves	3	1940–41, 1944–45, 1994–95
East Belfast	3	1954–55, 1992–93, 2018–19
Comber Recreation	2	1991–92, 2023–24
Harland & Wolff Welders	2	2010–11, 2015–16
Larne Olympic	2	1941–42, 1942–43
Mountpottinger YMCA	2	1903–04, 1905–06
Newington	2	2017–18, 2021–22
Albert Foundry (1923)	1	1949–50
Ards	1	2008–09
Ballymacash Rangers	1	2025–26
Ballymena United Reserves	1	1995–96
Black Diamonds	1	1911–12
Broadway United	1	1929–30
Cromac Albion	1	1978–79
Derriaghy Cricket Club	1	2024–25
Distillery II	1	1900–01
Donegal Celtic	1	2003–04
Downpatrick Recreation	1	1977–78
Highfield	1	1902–03
Killyleagh Youth	1	2002–03
Kilmore Recreation	1	2009–10
Ormiston	1	1924–25
RUC	1	1993–94
St Mary's	1	1925–26
Shorts	1	1979–80
Sirocco Works	1	1938–39
Wesley	1	1896–97
Willowfield	1	1927–28

== See also ==
- Bob Radcliffe Cup
- Craig Memorial Cup
- Fermanagh & Western Intermediate Cup
- County Antrim Shield
