= 1985–86 County Antrim Shield =

Tournament details
- Country: Northern Ireland
- Teams: 14

Final positions
- Champions: Distillery (14th win)
- Runners-up: Ballymena United

Tournament statistics
- Matches played: 13
- Goals scored: 47 (3.62 per match)

The 1985–86 County Antrim Shield was the 97th edition of the County Antrim Shield, a cup competition in Northern Irish football.

Distillery won the tournament for the 14th time, defeating Ballymena United 3–1 in the final.

== Results ==
=== First round ===
Team 1	Score	Team 2
Ballymena United	2–1	Larne
Bangor	1–3	Killyleagh Youth
Carrick Rangers	2–0	Ards
Cliftonville	0–1	Dundela
Distillery	1–0	Crusaders
Linfield	3–0	Ballyclare Comrades
Distillery II	bye	
Glentoran	bye	

=== Quarter-finals ===
Team 1	Score	Team 2
Carrick Rangers	3–5	Distillery
Distillery II	2–4	Ballymena United
Glentoran	2–3	Dundela
Linfield	w/o^{1}	Killyleagh Youth

^{1}Killyleagh progressed to the next round after Linfield were dismissed from the competition for failing to fulfil the fixture.

=== Semi-finals ===
Team 1	Score	Team 2
Ballymena United	3–1	Dundela
Distillery	6–0	Killyleagh Youth

=== Final ===
29 October 1985

Distillery	3–1	Ballymena United
Cleland 44'; Smith 71'; Williams 80'		Speak 66'

The Oval, Belfast
Attendance: 3,000
Referee: W. Clarke (Newtownards)
