= Skegoneill Avenue =

Football stadium in Belfast, Northern Ireland

Coordinates: 54.621°N 5.927°W

Skegoneill Avenue is a football stadium in Belfast, Northern Ireland. It is the home of Brantwood F.C., has a capacity of 5,100 and was built in 1952. It is located on the street of the same name, a residential road linking the Antrim and Shore roads.
