= Robert McBean =

Scottish footballer

Personal information
- Full name: Robert Chrichton McBean
- Date of birth: 23 July 1892
- Place of birth: Hutchesontown, Scotland
- Position: Outside left

Senior career*
Years	Team	Apps	(Gls)
1914–1915	Queen's Park	6	(1)
1915–1919	St Mirren	6	(3)
- Linfield
1919	Partick Thistle	1	(0)
–1920	Kirkintilloch Rob Roy		
1920–1922	Hamilton Academical	5	(0)
- * Club domestic league appearances and goals

Robert Chrichton McBean (23 July 1892 – after 1921) was a Scottish amateur footballer who played as an outside left in the Scottish League for Queen's Park and Hamilton Academical.

== Personal life ==
McBean served as a corporal in the Highland Light Infantry during the First World War.

== Career statistics ==
Appearances and goals by club, season and competition
Club	Season	League			National Cup		Total	
Club	Season	Division	Apps	Goals	Apps	Goals	Apps	Goals
Queen's Park	1914–15	Scottish First Division	6	1	—		6	1
St Mirren	1918–19	Scottish First Division	6	3	—		6	3
Partick Thistle	1918–19	Scottish First Division	1	0	—		1	0
Hamilton Academical	1920–21	Scottish First Division	5	0	0	0	5	0
Career total			18	4	0	0	18	4
