= Jimmy Maxwell (footballer) =

Irish footballer (1889–1916)

James 'Jimmy' Maxwell
Personal information
- Date of birth: 1889
- Date of death: 1 July 1916 (aged 27)
- Position: Forward

Senior career*
Years	Team	Apps	(Gls)
1901–1904	Linfield		
1904–1905	Glentoran	25	(3)
1905–1907	Belfast Celtic		

International career
1902–1907	Ireland Amateurs	7	(1)
- * Club domestic league appearances and goals

Jimmy Maxwell (1889 – 1 July 1916) was an Irish footballer who played as a forward.

== Club career ==
Maxwell was part of the Linfield side who won a treble in 1901–02, claiming Irish League, Irish Cup and City Cup winners medals, before moving to Glentoran in 1904, scoring on his return to his old club in a 2–2 draw. After a single season with Glentoran, he moved on to Belfast Celtic, where he played in the 1906 Irish Cup Final 2–0 defeat to Shelbourne.

== International career ==
Maxwell made his Ireland debut against Wales during the 1901-02 British Home Championship, and went on to make 7 international appearances, scoring one goal against Wales in 1906.

== Death ==
Maxwell died age 27 on 1 July 1916 whilst serving with the Royal Irish Rifles regiment of the British Army during the Battle of the Somme. He has no known grave and is commemorated on the Thiepval Memorial.
