= Belfast Charity Cup =

- Organiser(s): Irish Football Association
- Founded: 1883
- Abolished: 1940
- Region: Northern Ireland
- Most championships: Linfield (24 titles)

The Belfast Charity Cup was a football competition which ran from 1883 to 1941, and was based on a similar tournament in Scotland, the Glasgow Merchants Charity Cup. The competition was open to senior sides from Belfast and invited intermediate teams.

The last tournament was played in 1940. The following year, instead of the tournament being played, the holders Belfast Celtic played a representative match against players with cross-channel experience. The representative team won 3-1.

== List of finals ==
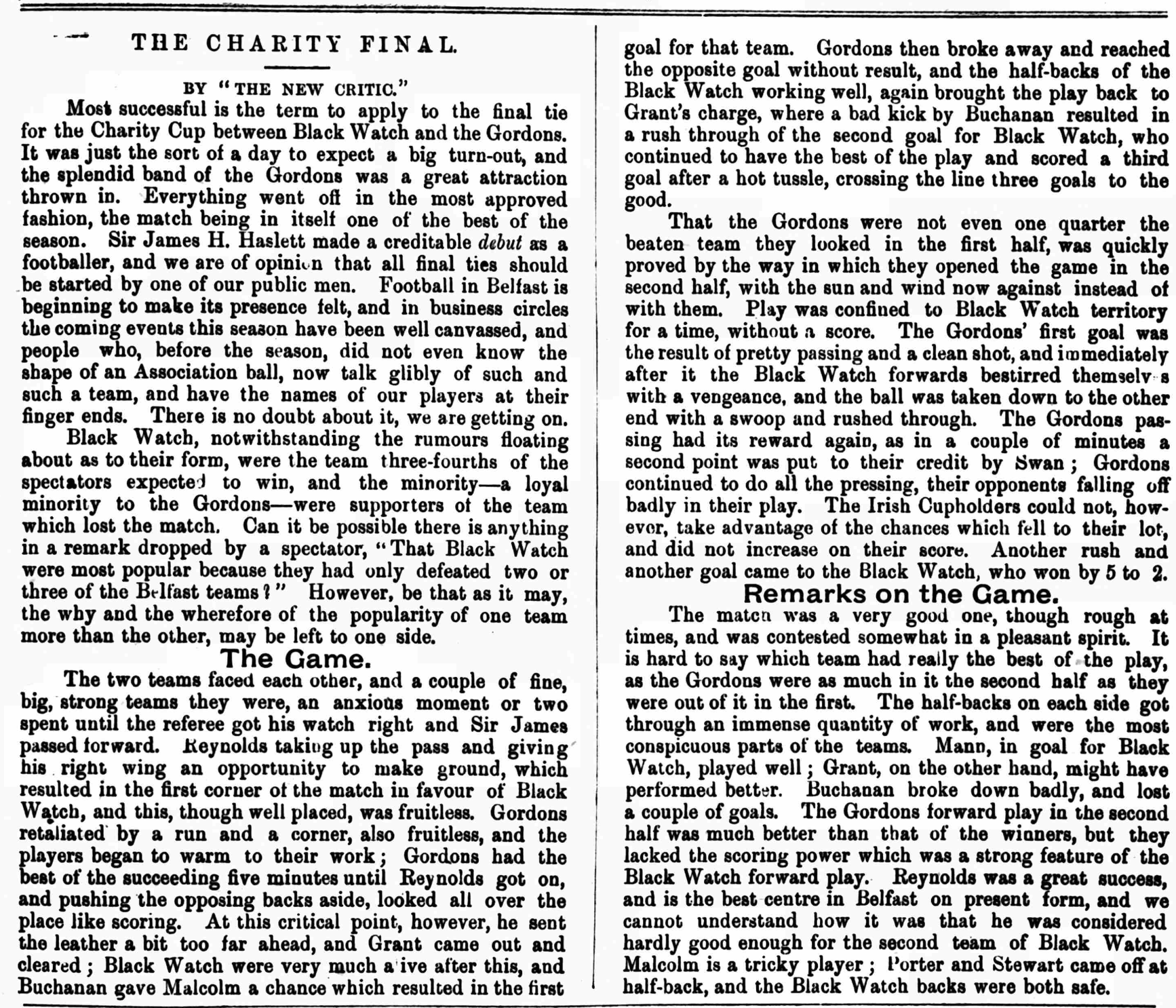
1889–90 Belfast Charity Cup Final, Black Watch 5–2 Gordon Highlanders, Ulster Football and Cycling News, 2 May 1890

Key:

	Scores level after 90 minutes. A replay was required.
(a.e.t.)	Scores level after extra time. A replay was required.
(a.e.t.)	Scores level after 90 minutes. Winner was decided in extra time with no penalty shootout required.
†	Scores level after 90 minutes. Trophy was shared.

#	Season	Winner (number of titles)	Score	Runner-up	Venue
1	1883–84	Cliftonville (1)	2 – 0	Distillery	Ulster Cricket Ground, Belfast
2	1884–85	Oldpark (1)	1 – 0	Cliftonville	Ulster Cricket Ground, Belfast
3	1885–86	Cliftonville (2)	5 – 1	Glentoran	Ulster Cricket Ground, Belfast
4	1886–87	Cliftonville (3)	3 – 2	YMCA	Ulster Cricket Ground, Belfast
5	1887–88	Cliftonville (4)	3 – 2	Linfield Athletic	Ulster Cricket Ground, Belfast
6	1888–89	Cliftonville (5)	4 – 2	Distillery	Solitude, Belfast
7	1889–90	Black Watch (1)	5 – 2	Gordon Highlanders	Ulster Cricket Ground, Belfast
8	1890–91	Linfield (1)	7 – 1	Ulster	Solitude, Belfast
9	1891–92	Linfield (2)	1 – 0	Distillery	Solitude, Belfast
10	1892–93	Linfield (3)	3 – 2	Distillery	Solitude, Belfast
11	1893–94	Linfield (4)	3 – 0	Glentoran	Solitude, Belfast
12	1894–95	Linfield (5)	3 – 1	Cliftonville	Solitude, Belfast
13	1895–96	Glentoran (1)	1 – 0	Cliftonville	Solitude, Belfast
14	1896–97	Cliftonville (6)	1 – 1	Distillery	Solitude, Belfast
14	Replay	Cliftonville (6)	6 – 2	Distillery	Solitude, Belfast
15	1897–98	North Staffordshire Regiment (1)	4 – 0	Glentoran	Solitude, Belfast
16	1898–99	Linfield (6)	2 – 1	Distillery	Solitude, Belfast
17	1899–1900	Distillery (1)	5 – 0	Linfield	Solitude, Belfast
18	1900–01	Linfield (7)	4 – 1	Distillery	Solitude, Belfast
19	1901–02	Glentoran (3)	2 – 0	Linfield	Solitude, Belfast
20	1902–03	Linfield (8)	2 – 0	Glentoran	Solitude, Belfast
21	1903–04	Belfast Celtic (1)	1 – 0	Glentoran	Solitude, Belfast
22	1904–05	Linfield (9)	2 – 0	Glentoran	Solitude, Belfast
23	1905–06	Cliftonville (6)	1 – 1 (a.e.t.)	Distillery	Solitude, Belfast
23	Replay	Cliftonville (6)	2 – 0	Distillery	Grosvenor Park, Belfast
24	1906–07	Glentoran (4)	2 – 0	Linfield	Solitude, Belfast
25	1907–08	Cliftonville (7)	3 – 1	Linfield	Grosvenor Park, Belfast
26	1908–09	Cliftonville (8)	0 – 0	Distillery	Solitude, Belfast
26	Replay	Cliftonville (8)	2 – 0	Distillery	Grosvenor Park, Belfast
27	1909–10	Belfast Celtic (2)	2 – 2 (a.e.t.)	Distillery	Solitude, Belfast
27	Replay	Belfast Celtic (2)	2 – 1	Distillery	Grosvenor Park, Belfast
28	1910–11	Glentoran	4 – 2	Belfast Celtic	Solitude, Belfast
29	1911–12	Belfast Celtic	3 – 0	Distillery	Solitude, Belfast
30	1912–13	Linfield	3 – 1	Belfast Celtic	Solitude, Belfast
31	1913–14	Linfield	1 – 0	Glentoran	Solitude, Belfast
32	1914–15	Linfield	1 – 0	Belfast Celtic	Grosvenor Park, Belfast
33	1915–16	Distillery	1 – 0	Linfield	Solitude, Belfast
34	1916–17	Linfield	1 – 0	Glentoran	Solitude, Belfast
35	1917–18	Linfield	1 – 0	Glentoran	Solitude, Belfast
36	1918–19	Linfield	1 – 0	Glentoran	Solitude, Belfast
37	1919–20	Belfast Celtic	3 – 0	Distillery	Solitude, Belfast
38	1920–21	Distillery	2 – 0	Glentoran	Solitude, Belfast
39	1921–22	Linfield	3 – 0	Cliftonville Olympic	Solitude, Belfast
40	1922–23	Glentoran	2 – 1	Crusaders	Solitude, Belfast
41	1923–24	Cliftonville	1 – 0 (a.e.t.)	Barn	Solitude, Belfast
42	1924–25	Glentoran	2 – 1	Belfast Celtic	Solitude, Belfast
43	1925–26	Belfast Celtic; Glentoran	1 – 1†	—	Solitude, Belfast
44	1926–27	Linfield	5 – 2	Glentoran	Solitude, Belfast
45	1927–28	Linfield	4 – 0	Belfast Celtic	Solitude, Belfast
46	1928–29	Distillery; Glentoran	3 – 3†	—	Solitude, Belfast
47	1929–30	Linfield	2 – 0	Belfast Celtic	Solitude, Belfast
48	1930–31	Distillery	4 – 2	Belfast Celtic	Grosvenor Park, Belfast
49	1931–32	Belfast Celtic	2 – 0	Linfield	Solitude, Belfast
50	1932–33	Linfield	3 – 0	Distillery	Solitude, Belfast
51	1933–34	Linfield	4 – 1	Distillery	Solitude, Belfast
52	1934–35	Linfield	1 – 1	Belfast Celtic	Solitude, Belfast
Replay	1934–35	Linfield	2 – 1	Belfast Celtic	Solitude, Belfast
53	1935–36	Belfast Celtic; Linfield	2 – 2†	—	Solitude, Belfast
54	1936–37	Belfast Celtic	1 – 0	Distillery	Solitude, Belfast
55	1937–38	Linfield	3 – 1	Glentoran	Solitude, Belfast
56	1938–39	Belfast Celtic	1 – 0	Linfield	Solitude, Belfast
57	1939–40	Belfast Celtic	3 – 0	Glentoran	Solitude, Belfast

== Performance by club ==
Club	Winners	Runners-up	Winning years	Runners-up years
Linfield	24 (1 shared)	8	1890–91, 1891–92, 1892–93, 1893–94, 1894–95, 1898–99, 1900–01, 1902–03, 1904–05, 1912–13, 1913–14, 1914–15, 1916–17, 1917–18, 1918–19, 1921–22, 1926–27, 1927–28, 1929–30, 1932–33, 1933–34, 1934–35, 1935–36 (shared), 1937–38	1887–88, 1899–1900, 1901–02, 1906–07, 1907–08, 1915–16, 1931–32, 1938–39
Belfast Celtic	10 (2 shared)	8	1903–04, 1909–10, 1911–12, 1919–20, 1925–26 (shared), 1931–32, 1935–36 (shared), 1936–37, 1938–39, 1939–40	1910–11, 1912–13, 1914–15, 1924–25, 1927–28, 1929–30, 1930–31, 1934–35
Cliftonville	10	3	1883–84, 1885–86, 1886–87, 1887–88, 1888–89, 1896–97, 1905–06, 1907–08, 1908–09, 1923–24	1884–85, 1894–95, 1895–96
Glentoran	8 (2 shared)	14	1895–96, 1901–02, 1906–07, 1910–11, 1922–23, 1924–25, 1925–26 (shared), 1928–29 (shared)	1885–86, 1893–94, 1897–98, 1902–03, 1903–04, 1904–05, 1913–14, 1916–17, 1917–18, 1918–19, 1920–21, 1926–27, 1937–38, 1939–40
Distillery	5 (1 shared)	15	1899–1900, 1915–16, 1920–21, 1928–29 (shared), 1930–31	1883–84, 1888–89, 1891–92, 1892–93, 1896–97, 1898–99, 1900–01, 1905–06, 1908–09, 1909–10, 1911–12, 1919–20, 1932–33, 1933–34, 1936–37
Oldpark	1	0	1884–85	—
Black Watch	1	0	1889–90	—
North Staffordshire Regiment	1	0	1897–98	—
YMCA	0	1	—	1886–87
Gordon Highlanders	0	1	—	1889–90
Ulster	0	1	—	1890–91
Cliftonville Olympic	0	1	—	1921–22
Crusaders	0	1	—	1922–23
Barn	0	1	—	1923–24

== Sources ==
- Malcolm Brodie, "100 Years of Irish Football", Blackstaff Press, Belfast (1980)
