= Johnnie Mercer (footballer) =

English footballer

Personal information
- Full name: John Thompson Mercer
- Date of birth: 27 March 1877
- Place of birth: Belfast, Ireland
- Date of death: 1947 (aged 69–70)
- Position: Winger

Senior career*
Years	Team	Apps	(Gls)
1893	Belview		
1893	Ligoniel		
1894–1895	81st North Lancashire Regiment		
1895–1896	8th Belfast Boys Brigade		
1896	Linfield Swifts		
1896–1897	Preston North End	0	(0)
1898–1899	Distillery		
1899–1900	Brighton United		
1900	Leicester Fosse	9	(2)
1900–1902	Linfield		
1902–1903	Distillery		
1903–1905	Derby County	26	(1)
1905–1906	Distillery		
1906–1908	Colne		
1908	Distillery		
Total		35	(3)

International career
1898–1905	Ireland	12	(1)
- * Club domestic league appearances and goals

John Thompson Mercer (27 March 1877–1947) was an Irish footballer who played in the Football League for Derby County and Leicester Fosse.
