= Bob Milne (footballer) =

Irish footballer

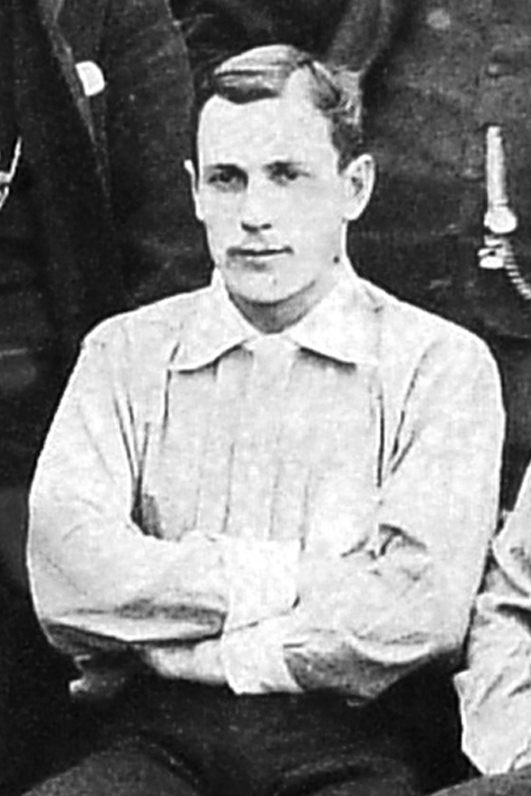
- Milne c. 1890

Personal information
- Full name: Robert George Milne
- Date of birth: 1 October 1870
- Place of birth: Inverarity, Scotland
- Date of death: 2 November 1932 (aged 62)
- Place of death: Belfast, Northern Ireland
- Height: 5 ft 9 in (1.75 m)
- Position: Centre half

Senior career*
Years	Team	Apps	(Gls)
188x–1890	Gordon Highlanders		
1890–1910	Linfield	194	(44)

International career
1893–1905	Irish League XI	10	(0)
1894–1906	Ireland (IFA)	27	(2)
- * Club domestic league appearances and goals

Robert George Milne (1 October 1870 – 2 November 1932) was a footballer who played for the Gordon Highlanders, Linfield and Ireland during the 1890s and early 1900s. Born in Scotland, Milne was stationed in Ireland with the Gordon Highlanders and played seven games for the regimental football team as they won the Irish Cup in 1890. He subsequently signed for Linfield and played 43 games and scored 19 goals for the club in the same competition and winning a total of 39 honours over 20 years.

Between 1894 and 1906, Milne made 27 appearances and scored two goals for Ireland. On 3 March 1894, at the Solitude Ground in Belfast, Milne, together with Olphert Stanfield, was a member of the Irish team that finally avoided defeat to England after thirteen attempts. Against an England side that included Fred Spiksley and Jack Reynolds, Ireland came back from 2–0 down to gain a 2–2 draw. Milne was also captain of Ireland during the 1903 British Home Championship. Until then the competition had been monopolised by England and Scotland but in 1903, before goal difference was applied, Ireland forced a three-way share. With a team that also included Archie Goodall, Jack Kirwan, Billy Scott and Billy McCracken, Ireland beat both Wales and Scotland 2–0. This was also the first time Ireland had beaten Scotland.

== Honours ==
Gordon Highlanders

- Irish Cup: 1890

Linfield

- Irish League: 1890–91, 1891–92, 1892–93, 1894–95, 1897–98, 1901–02, 1903–04, 1906–07, 1907–08, 1908–09
  - Runners Up: 1893–94, 1898–99, 1899–1900, 1902–03
- Irish Cup: 1891, 1892, 1893, 1895, 1898, 1899, 1902, 1904
  - Runners Up: 1894
- City Cup: 1895, 1896, 1898, 1900, 1901, 1902, 1903, 1904, 1908
  - Runners Up: 1899
- County Antrim Shield: 1899, 1904, 1906, 1907
  - Runners Up: 1896, 1897, 1898, 1903, 1905
- Belfast Charity Cup: 1891, 1892, 1893, 1895, 1899, 1901, 1903, 1905
  - Runners Up: 1890, 1900, 1902, 1907, 1908

Ireland

- British Home Championship: 1903 (shared)
