= Jack Peden =

Irish footballer (1863–1944)

John Peden
Personal information
- Full name: John Peden
- Date of birth: 12 July 1863
- Place of birth: Belfast, Ireland
- Date of death: 15 September 1944 (aged 81)
- Position: Outside left

Senior career*
Years	Team	Apps	(Gls)
1886–1893	Linfield		
1893–1894	Newton Heath	28	(7)
1894–1895	Sheffield United	8	(0)
1895–1898	Distillery		
1898–?	Linfield		

International career
1887–1899	Ireland	24	(7)
	Irish League XI	4	(?)
- * Club domestic league appearances and goals

John Peden (12 July 1863 – 15 September 1944) was an Irish footballer who played as an outside left for Newton Heath and Sheffield United in the 1890s. He made 24 appearances and scored seven goals for Ireland in a 12-year international career, interrupted by a two-year gap while he played in England (England-based players were not selected for the Ireland national team until 1899).

Born in Belfast, Peden began his career with Linfield as a 21-year-old in 1886. He signed for Newton Heath in February 1893, but did not make his debut for the Manchester side until the opening game of the 1893–94 season against Burnley on 2 September 1893. Peden left the Heathens at the end of the season to join Sheffield United, but he could not hold down a first-team place with the Yorkshire side, and returned to Ireland to play for Distillery. He finally returned to Linfield in 1898 before retiring at the end of the 1898–99 season.
