= Oldpark F.C. =

Former Association Football club in Northern Ireland

Oldpark
- Full name: Oldpark Football Club
- Nickname(s): The Lambs,The Mountain Boys
- Founded: 1880
- Dissolved: 1892
- Ground: Oldpark
- Patron: Lord Ashley
- Secretary: John Baxter Jr
- League: Irish League
1880–84 colours	1884–92 colours

Oldpark Football Club is an Irish former football club from north Belfast.

== History ==
The club was founded in 1880 by members of the Oldpark Cricket Club. It was subsequently a founding member of the Irish Football Association in 1880 and the Irish Football League in 1890.

The club's greatest honour was winning the Belfast Charity Cup in 1884–85, beating Cliftonville 1–0 in the final; the winning goal came early in the match, and was somewhat controversial, the umpires disagreeing whether the ball had crossed the line before goalkeeper Johns cleared it, but the referee deciding it had, "to the surprise and delight of the spectators". It was also runner-up in the County Antrim Shield in 1890–91, losing 4–2 to the Black Watch.

The club's 1891–92 Irish League season was a disaster, with only 2 wins in 14 matches, and, with the League cutting down on membership, was inevitably going to be voted out; instead therefore of playing the similarly-doomed Ligoniel in a meaningless end-of-season league match, Oldpark instead visited Distillery for a more lucrative friendly, lost 5–1, and folded.

== Colours ==
The club originally wore maroon, but resolved "unanimously" in September 1884 to change to royal blue and white.

== Ground ==
The club's ground was simply known as the Oldpark ground; it was probably the cricket ground near Cliftonville's Solitude.

== Notable players ==
Two Oldpark players earned national caps; "Cutter" Johnson and Robert Muir, who each collected two caps, in the same two matches, against Wales and Scotland in the 1885 Home International Championship.

== Honours ==
=== Senior honours ===
- Belfast Charity Cup: 1
  - 1884–85
