= Ulster Cricket Ground =

Former cricket facility in Northern Ireland

The Ulster Cricket Ground in Ballynafeigh Park was a sports venue in Ballynafeigh, Belfast. Opened in 1879, it was the home ground of both Ulster Cricket Club and Ulster F.C. During the 1880s, it also hosted several Irish Cup finals and Ireland international games. It has also hosted rugby union internationals. The ground is now Ulidia Playing Fields, owned by Belfast City Council and used by Rosario Youth Club F.C. and Ballynafeigh Breda Star F.C.
