= Willowfield F.C. =

Willowfield
- Full name: Willowfield F.C.
- Nickname(s): the Willows
- Founded: 1889
- Dissolved: 1930
- Ground: Gibson Park
Home colours

Willowfield F.C. is a defunct intermediate football club which existed in Northern Ireland during the inter-war years.

== History ==
The Willowfield club, associated with and funded by the Willowfield Unionist Club, existed from at least 1889, and it turned senior in 1918.

In the 1927–28 season, it became the first from outside the Irish League to win the Irish Cup since the League's formation in 1890. It defeated Larne 1–0 in a replay at Windsor Park, the Willows having held the lead in the first game from the 40th to the 85th minute. Willowfield had previously reached the Irish Cup final in 1923–24, when it lost 1–0 to Queen's Island (again at Windsor Park), the winning goal coming as early as the 2nd minute.

The club played in the Irish Intermediate League from 1921. However the club struggled with finance through the 1920s and folded in 1930. A new amateur club with the same name was founded in 1932 and its greatest success was winning the Clarence Cup in 1935–36, beating Malone R.C. 3–0 in the final.

== Colours ==
The club wore dark blue shirts, white shorts, and dark blue socks.

== Grounds ==
The club played from 1918 to 1926 at the Cregagh Recreation Grounds (home of Cregagh Cricket Club), and then at the Willowfield Recreation Grounds (now Gibson Park Avenue), which was opened on 4 September 1926. It is now the home of Malone Rugby Club, who acquired it in 1935.

== Honours ==
=== Senior honours ===
- Irish Cup: 1
  - 1927–28

=== Intermediate honours ===
- Irish Intermediate League: 1
  - 1927–28
- Irish Intermediate Cup: 2
  - 1923–24, 1927–28
- Steel & Sons Cup: 1
  - 1927–28

=== Willowfield Junior honours ===
- Irish Junior Cup: 2
  - 1906–07, 1907–08
- Beattie Cup: 3
  - 1914–15, 1915–16, 1922–23
- County Antrim Junior Shield: 1
  - 1916–17†

† Won by Willowfield II
