= Brantwood F.C. =

Association football club in Northern Ireland

Brantwood
- Full name: Brantwood Football Club
- Nickname: The Brants
- Founded: 1901
- Ground: Skegoneill Avenue
- Capacity: 1800
- Chairman: Wyndham Hearst
- League: Ballymena & Provincial Football League
- 2022-23: Ballymena & Provincial Football League, 5th
Home colours

Brantwood Football Club is an intermediate, Northern Irish football club playing in the Ballymena & Provincial Football League. The club, founded in 1901, hails from Belfast and plays its home matches at Skegoneill Avenue. Club colours are royal blue. In 2009, the club, which had failed to gain a place in the IFA Championship in 2008 and instead played in the IFA Interim Intermediate League, elected not to apply again for membership of the IFA Championship and announced that it would step down into the Ballymena & Provincial Intermediate League for season 2009–10, ending over 50 years at national intermediate level.

== History ==
Formed in 1901 and named after Brantwood Street, the club first played at the Glen, Alexandra Park Avenue. They won the Irish Junior Cup in 1913–14. From 1920 until 1930 they played at Dunmore Park, during which time they won the Intermediate League twice (1920–21 and 1924–25) and Steel & Sons Cup once. After 1930, Brantwood were unable to secure an extension to the lease at Dunmore Park and became homeless. For the next 22 years they played at various venues, including Ligoniel, Whiteabbey, Donaldson Crescent, Oldpark Avenue, Greencastle, York Park and another four-year spell at Dunmore. During this nomadic period the club won the Steel & Sons Cup twice, the Intermediate League and the Lyttle Cup. The club eventually bought its own ground and opened Skegoneill Avenue in 1952.

== Honours ==
=== Intermediate honours ===
- Irish Intermediate Cup: 4
  - 1951–52, 1952–53, 1972–73, 1990–91
- George Wilson Cup: 1
  - 1972–73
- Steel & Sons Cup: 9
  - 1920–21, 1931–32, 1950–51, 1951–52, 1952–53, 1955–56, 1976–77, 1985–86, 2005–06
- Irish Intermediate League: 5
  - 1920–21, 1924–25, 1947–48, 1951–52, 1953–54
- McElroy Cup: 1
  - 1924–25 (shared)
- Ballymena & Provincial League: 2
  - 2010–11, 2013–14

=== Junior honours ===
- Irish Junior Cup: 1
  - 1913–14
