= Belfast Celtic F.C. =

Northern Irish football club (1891–1960)

Belfast Celtic
- Full name: Belfast Celtic Football Club
- Nicknames: The Celts; The Grand Old Team
- Founded: 1891
- Dissolved: 1960
- Ground: Celtic Park, Belfast
- League: Irish League
Home colours

Belfast Celtic Football Club was an Irish football club. Founded in 1891 in Belfast, it was one of the most successful teams in Ireland until it withdrew permanently from the Irish League in 1949. The club left the league for political reasons, as the team and its supporters were largely Catholic and Irish nationalist. Belfast Celtic was one of four clubs that attracted the biggest crowds in the Irish League, the other three being Linfield, Distillery and Glentoran. Belfast Celtic played its last match in 1960.

== History ==
=== Early years ===
The club, formed in 1891 simply as Celtic, was named after Celtic Football Club of Glasgow. Upon incorporation as a limited company in 1901 however, the club was officially named as "Belfast Celtic Football and Athletic Company, Limited", with the title "The Celtic Football & Athletic Company Ltd" already being officially registered by the Glasgow club. The Belfast club therefore became known from 1901 onwards as Belfast Celtic. Their home from the same year was Celtic Park on Donegall Road in west Belfast, known to the fans as "Paradise". Celtic won their first league title in 1900 after beating fierce rivals Linfield by a single goal.

The severe political violence that began to engulf Ireland in the 1920s spilled onto the pitches and terraces of the Irish League. In 1920, the Irish Football Association fined and suspended the club following violent incidents at the Irish Cup semi-final. Celtic was forced to abandon their participation in the 1920–21 season, and did not rejoin the league until 1924–25 season. Celtic's support base was strongly Irish nationalist and Catholic but the club also enjoyed significant support from some local west Belfast Unionists and Protestants, who accounted for about 10 percent of the fan base.

Despite the background of political turmoil, the club went from strength to strength and the inter-war period proved to be Celtic's strongest: they were league champions four years running after their return to the league, and in the 1947–48 season, they recorded 31 consecutive wins across all competitions, which still stands as a European record. The club also produced some of the greatest players of their generation, and at one stage had five international goalkeepers in their squad.

=== 1948–49: Withdrawal from the Irish League and North American tour ===
The catalyst for the end of the club came on 27 December 1948, at the traditional Boxing Day league game between Linfield and Celtic at Windsor Park. Celtic were winning for most of the match but Linfield equalised in the final minute. Ecstatic Linfield fans invaded the pitch and began attacking several Celtic players, including centre-forward Jimmy Jones, who suffered a broken leg and was kicked unconscious, and Robin Lawlor and Kevin McAlinden, who were both seriously hurt.

Linfield issued a statement in which they blamed the attack on continual provocation from Celtic. Celtic's own statement, whilst equally blaming Linfield, focused particular criticism on the police who were present, who remained passive and made no arrests: "During the whole of this concerted attack the protection afforded to the unfortunate players may be fairly described as quite inadequate. In the circumstances the directors wish to make the strongest possible protest against the conduct of those responsible for the protection of the players in failing to take measures either to prevent the brutal attack or to deal with it with any degree of effectiveness after it developed."

Celtic also felt that the response from the Irish Football Association had been wholly inadequate. The team's management met on the night of the match and decided that the club had no option other than to withdraw entirely from the league after the end of the 1949 season. Northern Irish journalist Frank Curran later commented, "[Belfast F.C.] knew that it wasn't a football problem, and that there was nothing they as a football club could do to end it. So they got out."

Belfast Celtic played their final Irish League match on Thursday April 21, 1949 when they defeated Cliftonville 4–3 at Celtic Park. The club then went on a 10-game tour of the United States and Canada in May and June 1949. The dates of the tour forced the team to withdraw from the County Antrim Shield after qualifying to the semi-final, in which they were replaced by Linfield, whom they had earlier beaten 4–0. While the team was preparing to set sail for New York, it was announced publicly that Celtic intended to leave the league, pending the final decision of the club's shareholders at their annual meeting in June.

In New York City, the team were embraced as political martyrs by Irish nationalists. The team were introduced to New York City Mayor William O'Dwyer, a native of County Mayo, at New York City Hall on 4 May. They were presented by Deputy Commissioner Sean P. Keating, an IRA member, with a commemorative solid silver sugar bowl. Manager Elisha Scott fastened the club's pin, featuring the team's green and gold harp logo, upon the mayor's lapel. The first tour match was played 8 May 1949 against a representative team of players from the Greater New York professional American League clubs Brookhattan, Brooklyn Hispano and Brooklyn Hakoah at Triborough Stadium in New York City.

There was a public uproar in Northern Ireland when a photograph of the team marching behind an Irish tricolour flag before a match in New York was published in the Belfast Telegraph on 11 May. Likely fearing that the incident would ensure the end of the team in Belfast, the Protestant Elisha Scott sent a letter signed by seven of the players in which he explained the incident and claimed that the team was loyal to the United Kingdom:

"Before the game the team was requested by the American Soccer League officials to parade in single file round the Stadium, led by myself. Half-way round, Mr Connolly, editor of the Irish Echo, New York, took down a Tricolour which was flying in front of the enclosure. He requested me to carry one end and proceed in front of the team. We considered it better to carry on with the parade. Since then, steps have been taken to ensure against a recurrence. On the other side of the picture, which has apparently received no publicity, I may say that while the team was in Toronto, the King was toasted at a dinner given in honour of the Belfast Celtic Club, and further, before the match in Toronto, both teams stood to attention while the British National Anthem was played."

On 29 May, Celtic defeated Scotland 2–0 in front of 15,000 fans at Triborough Stadium. Fights broke out during the second half, including Scotland's Willie Waddell and Celtic's Mick O'Flanagan throwing punches. The New York Times reported that the American crowd was overwhelmingly partisan in favour of the Scots, cheering any of the referee's decisions against Celtic. Reported The Times, "The game held the crowd spellbound from beginning to end. Part of the reason was that it had come to see a highly favored Scots eleven—a team that had won the British Isles triple crown before 97,000 at Wembley Stadium last month—take the Irish into camp. Instead, the throng saw an inspired Belfast combination score once in the opening session and again in the second half to sew up the decision." The game was Scotland's only defeat during their nine-match tour of North America and it became one of the most famous in Celtic's history.

At the time, no specific reason was given to the public for the team's withdrawal from the Irish League. The club quietly sold all its players to other teams. Crusaders replaced Belfast Celtic in the league but fans were left without any official explanation for the withdrawal. In a 2011 profile, The Guardian spoke with Celtic fan Jimmy Overend, then 86, about the void left by the team's exit:

Of the demise of the club, which had lit up the lives of politically oppressed, impoverished Catholics such as himself, a general labourer, Overend laments: "It was like a black cloud coming down, as if there was nothing to live for or look forward to on a Saturday. It's a grief which never went away."

=== Post-exit from league ===
The club would never again play a competitive match but played several friendlies, including a match at home to Glasgow Celtic on 17 May 1952, when a team of ex-Belfast Celtic players took the field under the name of 'Newry F.C.' in aid of De La Salle Boys' Home in County Down. A final match—a testimonial—was played at Coleraine on 24 June 1960.

Celtic Park continued to function as a greyhound racing stadium until 1985, when it was demolished and replaced by the Park Centre, a small shopping centre.

== Club heritage ==
Today, a small museum has since been opened in the Park Centre by the Belfast Celtic Society and a plaque reminds shoppers a football team played there.

Padraig Coyle wrote a play, Lish and Gerry, about Elisha Scott and Linfield trainer Gerry Morgan. According to The Guardian, the play was performed to acclaim at Windsor Park in 2010, supported by the IFA and Linfield. The play concerns the team rivalry and the subtle irony of the fact that Elisha Scott of Celtic was a Protestant, while Gerry Morgan was Catholic.

In 2018, third-tier Belfast club Sport & Leisure Swifts F.C. announced plans to revive the 'Belfast Celtic' name. This request was granted by the IFA in 2019.

== Honours ==
=== Senior honours ===
- Irish League: 14
  - 1899–1900, 1914–15, 1919–20, 1925–26, 1926–27, 1927–28, 1928–29, 1932–33, 1935–36, 1936–37, 1937–38, 1938–39, 1939–40, 1947–48
- Irish Cup: 8
  - 1917–18, 1925–26, 1936–37, 1937–38, 1940–41, 1942–43, 1943–44, 1946–47
- City Cup: 10
  - 1905–06, 1906–07, 1925–26, 1927–28, 1929–30, 1930–31, 1932–33, 1939–40, 1947–48, 1948–49
- Gold Cup: 6
  - 1911–12, 1925–26, 1934–35, 1938–39, 1939–40, 1947–48
- County Antrim Shield: 8
  - 1894–95, 1909–10, 1926–27, 1935–36, 1936–37, 1938–39, 1942–43, 1944–45
- Belfast Charity Cup: 10
  - 1903–04, 1909–10, 1911–12, 1919–20, 1925–26 (shared), 1931–32, 1935–36 (shared), 1936–37, 1938–39, 1939–40
- Dublin and Belfast Inter-City Cup: 1
  - 1947–48 (shared)
- Belfast and District League: 1 (Note: An unofficial league which ran for four seasons between 1915 and 1919. It was set up while the Irish League was suspended during World War I.)
  - 1918–19
- Belfast City Cup: 1 (Note: A temporary competition set up to replace the City Cup while it was suspended during World War I.)
  - 1918–19 (shared)
- Northern Regional League: 4 (Note: An unofficial league which ran for seven seasons between 1940 and 1947. It was set up while the Irish League was suspended during World War II.)
  - 1940–41, 1941–42, 1943–44, 1946–47
- Substitute Gold Cup: 4 (Note: A temporary competition set up to replace the Gold Cup while it was suspended during World War II.)
  - 1940–41, 1943–44, 1945–46, 1946–47

=== Intermediate honours ===
Honours won by Belfast Celtic II

- Irish Intermediate League: 7
  - 1916–17, 1917–18, 1931–32, 1933–34, 1934–35, 1935–36, 1936–37
- Irish Intermediate Cup: 5
  - 1913–14, 1934–35, 1935–36, 1936–37, 1939–40
- Steel & Sons Cup: 5
  - 1912–13, 1916–17, 1917–18, 1934–35, 1935–36
- McElroy Cup: 7
  - 1916–17, 1932–33, 1934–35, 1935–36, 1936–37, 1942–43, 1943–44

=== Junior honours ===
- Irish Junior League: 3
  - 1893–94, 1894–95, 1895–96

== Selected former players ==
- (Ireland) (Republic of Ireland) Tom Aherne
- (Ireland) Louis Bookman
- (Ireland) Bertie Fulton
- (Ireland) (Republic of Ireland) Tommy Breen
- (Ireland) (Republic of Ireland) Jackie Brown
- (Ireland) Jackie Coulter
- (Ireland) Sammy Curran
- (Ireland) Mickey Hamill
- (Ireland) Andy Kennedy
- (Ireland) (Republic of Ireland) Jimmy McAlinden
- (Ireland) (Republic of Ireland) Billy McMillan
- (Ireland) Patrick O’Connell
- (Ireland) Elisha Scott
- (Ireland) Albert Edward (Ned) Weir
- (Ireland) Charlie Tully
- (Ireland) (Republic of Ireland) Jackie Vernon
- (Northern Ireland) Jimmy Jones
- (Ireland) Johnny Campbell
- (England) Ron Greenwood
- (England) George Kay
- (Republic of Ireland) John Feenan
- (Republic of Ireland) Mick O'Flanagan
- (Republic of Ireland) Oscar Traynor
- (Republic of Ireland) Robin Lawler
- (Scotland) Willie McStay
- (Scotland) Gerry McAloon

== Selected former managers ==
- (Ireland) Elisha Scott: 1934–1949
