= Lisburn Distillery F.C. =

Association football club in Northern Ireland

Lisburn Distillery
- Full name: Lisburn Distillery Football Club
- Nickname: The Whites
- Founded: 1880; 146 years ago (as Distillery)
- Ground: New Grosvenor Stadium
- Capacity: 1,500
- Chairman: Ryan McQuillan
- Manager: Lee Forsythe
- League: National Conference League Premier
- 2025–26: NIFL Premier Intermediate League, 13th of 14
- Website: lisburn-distillery.net
Home colours	Away colours

Lisburn Distillery Football Club is a Northern Irish intermediate football club who are based in Ballyskeagh, Lisburn. A founder member of the Irish League, they currently play in the National Conference League Premier, the third level of the Northern Ireland Football League. The club was simply known as Distillery Football Club from 1880 to 1999.

== History ==
Distillery Football Club was formed in November 1880 after members of V. R. Distillery Cricket Club decided to form a football team to stay active during the winter months. The directors of Dunville's Whiskey Distillery filled in a waste pond at the back of the distillery for the team. They remained at this ground, called Daisy Hill, until 1882 when they moved to a larger ground called Broadway, based adjacent to Celtic Park. They remained there until 1887 when they moved to Grosvenor Park, based at Distillery Street off the Grosvenor Road, close to their old Daisy Hill ground and spiritual home.

In 1920, Dunville's decided the sell the Grosvenor Park ground, and while Distillery were able to play there during the 1920–21 season, during 1921–22 the club played all of its games away from home. For the start of the 1922–23 season, they secured a new ground called York Park on the Shore Road, Belfast, where they remained until 1927 when they returned to Grosvenor Park after Dunville's agreed to let them play there again, having not found the ground fit for their purposes. Distillery had been forced to look for a new ground after strong winds had blown down the main stand of their York Park ground.

On 30 December 1952, the first full match played under floodlights, anywhere in Ireland, took place at Grosvenor Park. Distillery's opposition were English team Burnley. The first officially approved competitive match under floodlights in the British Isles took place at Grosvenor Park on 25 March 1953 when Distillery Seconds played Ballymena United Reserves in the George Wilson Cup and the first floodlight league game in the British Isles took place at Grosvenor Park on 24 December 1953 when Distillery played Coleraine.

Distillery remained at Grosvenor Park until 1971, when the Troubles directly affected the club. The area around the ground was situated in a flashpoint area, creating a security risk which had already caused the club to play matches elsewhere, but the deciding factor for the club to finally leave the area was the burning down of its money-making social club in August 1971.

After sharing Skegoneill Avenue (Brantwood) and Seaview (Crusaders) for some years, the club moved in 1980 to a permanent new home at New Grosvenor Stadium, Ballyskeagh, County Antrim, on the southern outskirts of Belfast. The main stand at New Grosvenor Park is named after legendary player Bertie McMinn.

The club was known simply as Distillery from its foundation until 1999, when it changed its official name to 'Lisburn Distillery' to associate itself more closely with its adopted borough (now city) of Lisburn. However, the club is still colloquially referred to as "Distillery". The club colour is white. A founder member of the Irish League in 1890, the club remained at the top until 1995.

== European record ==
=== Overview ===
Competition	Matches	W	D	L	GF	GA
European Cup	2	0	1	1	3	8
UEFA Europa League	2	0	0	2	1	11
European Cup Winners' Cup	2	0	0	2	1	7
UEFA Intertoto Cup	4	0	0	4	3	8
TOTAL	10	0	1	9	8	34

=== Matches ===
Season	Competition	Round	Opponent	Home	Away	Aggregate
1963–64	European Cup	PR	(Portugal) Benfica	3–3	0–5	3–8
1971–72	European Cup Winners' Cup	1R	(Spain) Barcelona	1–3	0–4	1–7
2005	UEFA Intertoto Cup	1R	(Lithuania) Žalgiris Vilnius	0–1	0–1	0–2
2008	UEFA Intertoto Cup	1R	(Finland) TPS Turku	2–3	1–3	3–6
2009–10	UEFA Europa League	1QR	(Georgia (country)) Zestaponi	1–5	0–6	1–11

== Current squad ==
Note: Flags indicate national team as defined under FIFA eligibility rules; some limited exceptions apply. Players may hold more than one non-FIFA nationality.

No.	Pos.	Nation	Player
1	GK	NIR	Jonny Holland
2	DF	NIR	Dean Lewis
3	DF	NIR	Lewis Hunter
4	MF	NIR	Callum McComb
5	DF	NIR	Josh Cahoon
6	DF	NIR	Jordan Morrison
7	MF	NIR	Aaron Cochrane
8	MF	NIR	Bradley Porter
9	FW	NIR	Callum Dougan
10	FW	FRA	Guillaume Keke
11	FW	NIR	Nathan Clarke
12	FW	NIR	Jack Boyd
13	MF	NIR	Justin Grattan
14	MF	NIR	Mark McKee
15	MF	NIR	Ross Ferguson
16	MF	NIR	George Trimble
18	MF	NIR	Ryan Sharkey
20	GK	NIR	Aaron Hoey-Kemp
23	FW	IRL	Victor Ihemeje

== Former players ==
- (Northern Ireland) Curtis Allen
- (Northern Ireland) Stephen Baxter
- (Northern Ireland) Bobby Brennan
- (Northern Ireland) Billy Campbell
- (Northern Ireland) Billy Crone
- (Northern Ireland) Bob Crone
- (Northern Ireland) David Cushley
- (Northern Ireland) Derek Dougan
- (Scotland) Willie Fagan
- (Northern Ireland) Glenn Ferguson
- (Northern Ireland) Jimmy Ferris
- (England) Tom Finney
- (Northern Ireland) Tommy Forde
- (Northern Ireland) Billy Hamilton
- (Northern Ireland) Bryan Hamilton
- (Northern Ireland) Felix Healy
- (Northern Ireland) Ted Hinton
- (Northern Ireland) Andy Hunter
- (Northern Ireland) Glenn Hunter
- (Northern Ireland) Samuel Johnston
- (Northern Ireland) Sammy Jones
- (England) George Kay
- (Northern Ireland) John Kennedy
- (Northern Ireland) Norman Lockhart
- (Northern Ireland) Josh Magennis
- (Northern Ireland) Jim Magilton
- (Northern Ireland) Peter McCann
- (Northern Ireland) Bill McCracken
- (Northern Ireland) Gerry McElhinney
- (Scotland) Jimmy McIntosh
- (Northern Ireland) Allen McKnight
- (Northern Ireland) Bertie McMinn
- (Northern Ireland) Derek Meldrum
- (Northern Ireland) Joe Meldrum
- (Northern Ireland) Brian Moore
- (Scotland) Max Murray
- (Northern Ireland) George O’Boyle
- (Northern Ireland) George O’Halloran
- (Northern Ireland) Martin O'Neill
- (Scotland) Jocky Petrie
- (Northern Ireland) Peter Rafferty
- (England) Jack Reynolds
- (Northern Ireland) Anton Rogan
- (Scotland) Bill Salisbury
- (Northern Ireland) Kenny Shiels
- (Northern Ireland) Olphert Stanfield
- (England) Maurice Tadman
- (Northern Ireland) Norman Uprichard
- (England) Julian Ward
- (Northern Ireland) Andrew Waterworth
- (Northern Ireland) Peter Watson
- (Northern Ireland) Eric Welsh
- (Northern Ireland) Paul Williams

== Managerial history ==
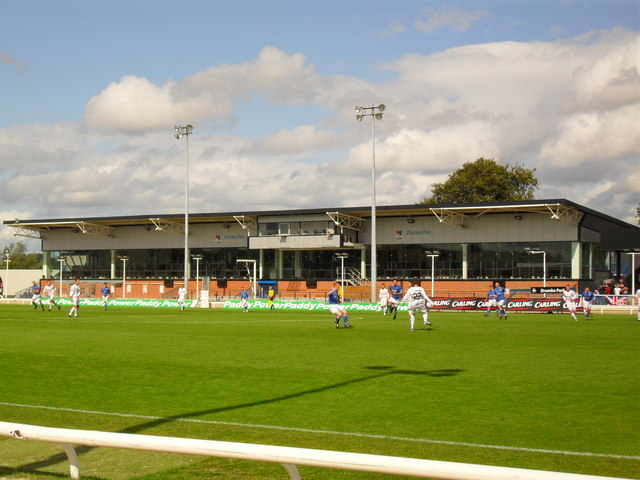
Lisburn Distillery playing in August 2009.

- (Scotland) Neil Harris (1932–34)
- (Northern Ireland) Michael Hamill (24 July 1934 to 31 March 1935)
- (Scotland) Bob Preston (19 April 1935 to 6 January 1937)
- (Northern Ireland) Joe McCleery (4 March 1937 to 14 August 1937)
- (Northern Ireland) William McDevitt (25 January 1938 to 20 Mar 1939)
- (England) Alf Peachey (3 May 1940 to 29 March 1945)
- (England) Gordon Clark (18 February 1949 to 12 January 1950)
- (Northern Ireland) Eddie Lonsdale (16 January 1950 to 11 August 1950)
- (Northern Ireland) Robert Gunning (12 August 1950 to 7 September 1951)
- (Scotland) Jimmy McIntosh (20 June 1952 to 17 February 1955)
- (England) Maurice Tadman (30 June 1955 to 16 December 1958)
- (England) George Eastham Sr. (16 June 1959 to 12 March 1964)
- (Northern Ireland) Tommy Casey (25 January 1967 to 12 October 1968)
- (Northern Ireland) Jimmy McAlinden (5 February 1969 to 12 May 1975)
- (Northern Ireland) Roy Welsh (29 September 1975 to 31 October 1977)
- (Scotland) Gibby MacKenzie (31 October 1977 to 19 December 1979)
- (Northern Ireland) Bertie Neill (20 December 1979 to 5 February 1981)
- (Northern Ireland) Tommy Lowrie (13 February 1981 to 6 September 1981)
- (Northern Ireland) Jimmy Brown (18 Sep 1981 to 7 December 1981)
- (Northern Ireland) Marty Quinn (September/October 1988 to 18 November 1989)
- (Northern Ireland) Billy Hamilton (16 December 1989 to 16 February 1996)
- (Northern Ireland) Paul Kirk (17 February 1996 to 14 May 2009)
- (Northern Ireland) Jimmy Brown 19 May 2009 to 18 September 2009
- (Northern Ireland) Tommy Wright (26 September 2009 to 2 November 2011)
- (Northern Ireland) John Cunningham (6 November 2011 to 7 May 2012)
- (Northern Ireland) Tim McCann (24 May 2012 to 16 April 2013)
- (Northern Ireland) Tommy Kincaid (2 May 2013 to 12 Oct 2015)
- (Northern Ireland) Sean-Paul Murray (3 November 2015 to 24 May 2016)
- (Northern Ireland) Colin McIlwaine & George O'Boyle (24 May 2016 to 5 April 2019)
- (Northern Ireland) Stephen Hatfield (23 April 2019 to 8 March 2020)
- (Northern Ireland) Johnny Clapham (17 March 2020 to 22 April 2022)
- (Northern Ireland) Raymond Alexander (12 May 2022 to 15 June 2022)
- (Northern Ireland) Barry Johnston (21 June 2022 to 10 March 2025)
- (Northern Ireland) Stephen Hughes (11 March 2025 to 3 November 2025)
- (Northern Ireland) Adam McCart (3 November 2025 to 17 November 2025)
- (Northern Ireland) Lee Forsythe (17 November 2025 to present)

== Honours ==
=== Senior honours ===
- Irish League (tier 1): 6 (inc. 1 shared)
  - 1895–96, 1898–99, 1900–01, 1902–03, 1905–06 (shared), 1962–63
- Irish League First Division (tier 2): 2
  - 1998–99, 2001–02
- Irish Cup: 12
  - 1883–84, 1884–85, 1885–86, 1888–89, 1893–94, 1895–96, 1902–03, 1904–05, 1909–10, 1924–25, 1955–56, 1970–71
- Irish League Cup: 1
  - 2010–11
- County Antrim Shield: 14
  - 1888–89, 1892–93, 1895–96, 1896–97, 1899–1900, 1902–03, 1904–05, 1914–15, 1918–19, 1919–20, 1945–46, 1953–54, 1963–64, 1985–86
- Gold Cup: 5
  - 1913–14, 1919–20, 1924–25, 1929–30, 1993–94
- City Cup: 5
  - 1904–05, 1912–13, 1933–34, 1959–60, 1962–63
- Ulster Cup: 2
  - 1957–58, 1998–99
- Belfast Charity Cup: 5
  - 1899–1900, 1915–16, 1920–21, 1928–29, 1930–31
- Dublin and Belfast Inter-City Cup: 1
  - 1947–48 (shared)

=== Intermediate honours ===
- Irish Intermediate Cup: 3
  - 1892–93†, 1902–03†, 1947–48‡
- Steel & Sons Cup: 1
  - 1900–01ƒ
- George Wilson Cup: 3
  - 1956–57‡, 1981–82‡, 1987–88‡
- McElroy Cup: 2
  - 1918–19‡, 1920–21‡

† Won by Distillery Rovers (reserve team)

‡ Won by Distillery II (reserve team)

ƒ Won by Distillery West End (reserve team)

=== Junior honours ===
- Irish Junior League: 3
  - 1890–91‡, 1892–93‡, 1902–03‡
- Irish Junior Cup: 1
  - 1887–88‡

‡ Won by Distillery II (reserve team)
