= 1880–81 Irish Cup =

Tournament details
- Country: Ireland
- Date: 5 February 1881 – 9 April 1881
- Teams: 7

Final positions
- Champions: Moyola Park (1st title)
- Runner-up: Cliftonville

Tournament statistics
- Matches played: 7
- Goals scored: 26 (3.71 per match)

The 1880–81 Irish Cup was the inaugural edition of the Irish Cup, the premier knock-out cup competition in Irish football. The competition began on 5 February 1881 with the first round and ended on 9 April 1881 with the final. Moyola Park were the first winners of the competition, and they have never won it since.

The competition was played in a straight knock-out format. If a match ended level at full time, a replay was required to decide the winner. The first Irish Cup replay was between Cliftonville and Knock on 26 March 1881. William Morrow of Moyola Park scored the first goal in an Irish Cup final during his club's 1–0 win over Cliftonville to lift the trophy.

== Results ==
=== First round ===
The draw for the first round was made on 10 January 1881, with the matches played on Saturday, 5 February 1881. Alexander received a bye into the semi-finals as a result of the odd number of seven participants.

| Team 1 | Score | Team 2 |
|---|---|---|
| Knock | 11–0 | Distillery |
| Moyola Park | 2–0 | Avoniel |
| Oldpark | 0–2 | Cliftonville |

=== Semi-finals ===
The 3 first round winners entered this round, along with Alexander. The matches took place on Saturday, 12 March 1881.

| Team 1 | Score | Team 2 |
|---|---|---|
| Moyola Park | 3–0 | Alexander |
| Cliftonville | 2–2 | Knock |

==== Replay ====
The match took place on Saturday, 26 March 1881.

| Team 1 | Score | Team 2 |
|---|---|---|
| Knock | 1–2 | Cliftonville |

=== Final ===
The inaugural Irish Cup final was played on 9 April 1881 at the Cliftonville Cricket Ground, Belfast in front of 1,500 spectators.

Moyola Park 1
| GK | Robert MacKrell |
| BK | George Hewison |
| BK | Dowd |
| HB | Francis McLernon |
| HB | Patrick McSwiggan |
| FW | Robert Redmond |
| FW | Daniel McKenna |
| FW | William Hueston |
| FW | Thomas Hueston |
| FW | Mitchell Redmond |
| FW | William Morrow 75' |

Cliftonville 0
| GK | Robert Kennedy |
| BK | Howell |
| BK | John McAlery |
| HB | J Baird |
| HB | D Martin |
| FW | Renwick Potts |
| FW | Dr John Davison |
| FW | F Beyer |
| FW | Williams |
| FW | H McKeague |
| FW | David Hannay |
