= Eddie Patterson =

Northern Irish football manager

Personal information
- Full name: Edward Patterson
- Date of birth: 22 September 1961 (age 65)
- Place of birth: Belfast, Northern Ireland
- Position: Midfielder

Senior career*
Years	Team	Apps	(Gls)
- Newington
- Chimney Corner

Managerial career
- 2005–2011: Cliftonville
- 2012–2015: Glentoran
- * Club domestic league appearances and goals

Edward Patterson (born 22 September 1961 in Belfast), better known as Eddie Patterson is the former manager of NIFL Premiership clubs Cliftonville and Glentoran. He was relieved of his duties as Glentoran manager on Saturday 17 October 2015. Despite winning two Irish Cups in three years, the club highlighted deteriorating league positions and performances as the main reason for his dismissal.

== Early life ==
Patterson, from the Bruslee Way/Pinkerton Walk area of the New Lodge Road, was brought up in Belfast. He now lives in Glengormley. In the 1970s, he played midfield for Newington Football Club in the Down and Connor League, along with John McAuley, Gary Higgins and Paddy McCoy, all of whom were later to emulate him by playing for Irish League teams. Patterson went on to have a spell playing intermediate football for Chimney Corner under former Cliftonville boss Lawrence Stitt.

== Cliftonville ==
Patterson took temporary charge of The Reds on 22 July 2005, when former manager Liam Beckett walked out, and was officially confirmed as Cliftonville boss on 11 October 2006. He had been assistant manager the previous season. Patterson starred for the club during his playing days and was also a successful manager of the reserve side, Cliftonville Olympic.

=== 2005/2006 Season ===
In his first season in charge of the Cliftonville F.C. Senior side, Patterson led his side to a fifth-place finish, an improvement on the 11th place in the previous year. The season ended in controversy, however, after a registration error involving fellow Irish League side Coleraine F.C. Had Cliftonville been awarded the extra three points due to this registration error, they would have climbed above Dungannon Swifts F.C. into fourth place and qualification for the UEFA Intertoto Cup the following season. Nevertheless, coming fifth was the club's best performance since winning the title in 1998.

The team's biggest victory that season was an 8–1 hammering of Armagh City F.C. During the January transfer window, Patterson re-signed two former players, Chris Scannell, who had been away in Australia for just over a year, and Barry Johnston, from Coleraine.

=== 2006/2007 Season ===
In preparation for his second year in charge, Patterson signed a number of influential players. Defenders David McAlinden, the son of a Cliftonville legend, arrived from Glenavon F.C., and Barry Holland joined his brother Mark after leaving Bangor F.C. In addition, Goalkeeper John Connolly returned for his second spell at Solitude.

Patterson's second season in the job proved even more successful than the first. After the disappointment of losing the CIS Cup final 1–0 to city rivals Glentoran, his side went on to win the County Antrim Shield in January 2007 by defeating Lisburn Distillery F.C. 2–1 in the final. Both goals were scored by Mark Holland. Patterson also signed Vincent Sweeney from Limavady United F.C. and Daniel Lyons on loan from Donegal Celtic F.C. However John O'Loughlin (Finn Harps) and Conor Downey (Linfield F.C.) both left the club. Patterson's side also reached the semi-final of the Irish Cup but lost a penalty shootout to Dungannon Swifts. Cliftonville finished third in the league, narrowly missing out on second place, but nevertheless qualifying for the Intertoto Cup and the Setanta Cup for the following season.

=== 2007/2008 Season ===
Patterson wasted little time in preparing for Europe. With the first leg of the UEFA Intertoto Cup due to be played on 23 June 2007 against Latvian side Dinaburg FC, he signed Francis Murphy from Lisburn Distillery and Kieran O'Connor from Armagh City, and made Daniel Lyons permanent signing. Became the first Cliftonville manager to win a European tie.

Cliftonville's performances in the majority of the season had made them genuine title contenders, however a poor run of form towards the end of the campaign ended their hopes of winning the biggest prize in local football. The Reds ended the league campaign in third position fourteen points adrift of Champions Linfield.

=== 2008/2009 Season ===
During the 2008/2009 campaign, Cliftonville struggled in terms of their league performance but finished strongly to secure a top 6 finish. They won the County Antrim Shield and reached the Irish Cup final, 30 years since their previous victory in the competition. It was not to be a victorious occasion with the Reds losing out to their near neighbors Crusaders FC, 1–0 who had waited 41 years to taste Irish Cup Success. It was a bitter pill for the Reds to swallow, not only losing but to lose to their near neighbors made the occasion heart breaking for the Red Army.

Patterson was sacked in April 2011 .

== Glentoran ==
Patterson returned to Irish League football after being appointed manager of East Belfast club Glentoran on 22 February 2012.

=== 2011/2012 ===
Patterson was appointed manager after the resignation of Scott Young. Glentoran finished sixth in the table later that season.

=== 2012/2013 ===
Patterson soon made changes to the squad, he sold a few players, including Leon Knight and Aidan O'Kane. Patterson then brought in new faces, one of them was Jay Magee from Glenavon. Glentoran kicked off the new season with a 3–1 win over Donegal Celtic, and finished it with a convincing 3–1 victory over his former club Cliftonville in the Irish Cup final.

== Honours ==
=== As a manager ===
- County Antrim Shield: 2
  - Cliftonville F.C. 2006/07, 2008/09
- Irish Cup: 2
  - Glentoran 2012/13, 2014/15
