= 1882 in association football =

The following are the association football events of the year 1882 throughout the world.

== Events ==
Ireland played their first international friendly on 18 February 1882 against England losing 0–13 in Belfast.

=== England ===
- Burnley F.C.
- Corinthian F.C.
- Gresley Rovers F.C.
- Oxford City F.C.
- Queens Park Rangers F.C.
- Skelmersdale United F.C.
- Torquay United F.C.
- Tottenham Hotspur F.C.

=== Scotland ===
- Albion Rovers F.C.

=== Sweden ===
- Gefle IF

== Domestic cups ==
Nation	Tournament	Winner	Score	Runner-up	Venue	Title	Last title won
England	1881–82 FA Cup	Old Etonians	1-0	Blackburn Rovers	Kennington Oval	2nd	1879
Ireland	1881–82 Irish Cup	Queen's Island	1-0	Cliftonville	Ulster Cricket Ground	1st	None
Scotland	1881–82 Scottish Cup	Queen's Park	4-1 (replay after 2-2 draw)	Dumbarton	Cathkin Park	6th	1881
Wales	1881–82 Welsh Cup	Druids	5-0	Northwich Victoria	Racecourse Ground	3rd	1881

== Births ==
- 4 April – Harold Hardman (d. 1965), England international forward in four matches (1905–1908).
- 23 April – Tom Brittleton (d. 1955), England international half-back in five matches (1912–1914).
- 26 August – Sam Hardy (d. 1966), England international goalkeeper in 21 matches (1907–1920).
- 8 October – Jock Walker (d. 1968), Scotland international full-back in nine matches (1911–1913).
- 11 October – Arthur Bridgett (d. 1954), England international forward in eleven matches (1905–1909), scoring three goals.
- 21 October – Jimmy Windridge (d. 1939), England international forward in eight matches (1908–1909), scoring seven goals.

=== Date unknown ===
- James Edgar, English professional footballer
