= Barry Johnston (footballer) =

Irish footballer

Personal information
- Date of birth: 28 October 1979 (age 47)
- Place of birth: Belfast, Northern Ireland
- Position: Defensive midfielder

College career
Years	Team	Apps	(Gls)
2000–2002	William Carey Crusaders		

Senior career*
Years	Team	Apps	(Gls)
1998–2000	Cliftonville	?	(?)
2002–2006	Coleraine	82	(2)
2006–2009	Cliftonville	83	(3)
2009	→ Shamrock Rovers (loan)	4	(0)
2009–2010	Glenavon	15	(0)
2010–2015	Cliftonville	239	(15)
2015–2016	Carrick Rangers	25	(0)

Managerial career
- 2022–2025: Lisburn Distillery
- * Club domestic league appearances and goals

Barry Johnston (born 28 October 1979) is a retired Northern Irish footballer and manager.

== Playing career ==
After serving apprenticeships at Celtic Boys under Jim Heaney, in 1999 Johnston joined Cliftonville's U18. Although he believed he would have preferred becoming a winger, the coach Heaney considered his best position was a defensive sweeper or right back. Johnston suffered a leg injury, which almost terminated his career and which left him with nine screws and a steel plate anchored to his marrow. In 2000, Johnston took a leave from football and spent a two-year scholarship in the United States in New Orleans with William Carey College. After returning from the United States, he came back playing football at Coleraine. He stayed there for four years, reaching two Irish Cup Finals in 2003 and 2004 against Glentoran, winning the first one.

Johnston moved back to Cliftonville in January 2006. He lost another Irish Cup final in May 2009 against Crusaders.

In 2009, he signed a loan for Shamrock Rovers after impressing in friendly appearances against Newcastle and Hibernians, making his competitive debut as a substitute in a win over Derry City at Tallaght Stadium. Johnston returned to Northern Ireland to sign for Glenavon in December 2009.

He then signed for Cliftonville for the third time in September 2010. Johnston scored Cliftonville's equaliser against The New Saints in the 2011–12 UEFA Europa League.

In July 2015, Johnston moved to newly promoted Carrick Rangers. Johnston moved due to a knee injury which prevented him from playing as much on artificial turf.

== Coaching career ==
Johnston retired in 2016 and joined the Cliftonville staff in March 2018.

In June 2022 Johnston was appointed manager of NIFL Premier Intermediate League side Lisburn Distillery

On 10 March 2025, Johnston departed the club.

== Honours ==
Coleraine

- Irish Cup: 2002–03

Cliftonville

- NIFL Premiership: 2012–13, 2013–14
- Northern Ireland Football League Cup: 2012–13, 2013–14, 2014–15
- County Antrim Shield: 2006–07, 2008–09, 2011–12, 2014–15
- NIFL Charity Shield: 2014
