= Conor Downey =

Northern Irish footballer

Personal information
- Full name: Conor Downey
- Date of birth: 12 March 1982 (age 44)
- Place of birth: Belfast, Northern Ireland
- Height: 1.77 m (5 ft 9 1/2 in)
- Position: Centre midfielder

Team information
- Current team: Donegal Celtic
- Number: 16

Senior career*
Years	Team	Apps	(Gls)
–2000	Carrick Rangers		
2000–2003	Cliftonville		
2003–2004	Lisburn Distillery		
2004–2007	Cliftonville		
2007–2008	Linfield		
2008–2010	Cliftonville		
2010–2011	Newry City	21	(1)
2011–2012	Ballymena United	21	(0)
2012–	Donegal Celtic	0	(0)
- * Club domestic league appearances and goals

Conor Downey (born 12 March 1982 in Belfast) is a Northern Irish professional footballer who plays for Donegal Celtic.

Downey played for Carrick Rangers before joining Cliftonville in 2000. In his first spell at the club he played largely as a striker, alongside Chris Scannell. He was allowed to leave the club to join Lisburn Distillery in March 2003 on a free transfer, but returned in August 2004, reportedly only beating the transfer deadline by a matter of hours.

Upon his return to Solitude, manager Liam Beckett decided that to deploy Downey as a midfielder, and since then he has made the position his own. After a good season in 2005/06, helping Cliftonville to a 5th-placed finish, Downey attracted the interest of the likes of Glentoran and Portadown. He rejected their advances however, and opted to stay with the Reds. In January 2007 however, the BBC reported that Linfield and Derry City had made approaches for the player, at the same time he was also linked with English sides Oldham Athletic and Peterborough United F.C. and Gretna F.C. from the Scottish First Division.

Downey joined Linfield later that month and his first game for the Blues was against Portadown F.C. on 20 January 2007. Part of the deal taking him to Linfield was that Cliftonville would be allowed to use Linfield's Windsor Park ground for European games. This in turn enabled Cliftonville to obtain a UEFA licence in April 2007. He quickly established himself in the Linfield side, earning a place in the Irish League side that beat the England semi-professional side in February 2007. However, on 7 March 2007 he was ruled out for the rest of the season after a cruciate ligament injury picked up in the Setanta Cup game against Glentoran two days previously.

Rejoined Cliftonville in September 2008.
