= 1883–84 Irish Cup =

Tournament details
- Country: Ireland
- Date: 22 December 1883 – 19 April 1884
- Teams: 25

Final positions
- Champions: Distillery (1st title)
- Runners-up: Wellington Park

Tournament statistics
- Matches played: 23
- Goals scored: 96 (4.17 per match)

The 1883–84 Irish Cup was the 4th edition of the Irish Cup, the premier knock-out cup competition in Irish football.

Distillery won the tournament for the 1st time, defeating Wellington Park 5–0 in the final. The holders Cliftonville were eliminated in the third round by Distillery.

== Results ==
=== First round ===
Team 1	Score	Team 2
Glentoran	3–0	Mount Avon
Ulster	5–1	Glenalina
Ligoniel	w/o	Distillery
Down Athletics	0–3	Queen's Island
Cliftonville	7–0	Hertford
Spencer	1–7	Oldpark
Wellington Park	w/o	Avoniel
Clarence	0–2	YMCA
Strabane	1–2	Alexander
Victoria (R.I.C.)	0–4	Limavady Wanderers
Magherafelt	4–0	Kilrea
Dublin University	1–2	Dublin Association
Moyola Park	bye	

=== Second round ===
Team 1	Score	Team 2
Wellington Park	4–4	Queen's Island
Cliftonville	1–1	Oldpark
YMCA	1–4	Distillery
Glentoran	0–7	Ulster
Limavady Wanderers	0–2	Alexander
Moyola Park	6–0	Magherafelt
Dublin Association	bye	

==== Replays ====
Team 1	Score	Team 2
Queen's Island	1–2	Wellington Park
Oldpark	0–4	Cliftonville

=== Third round ===
Team 1	Score	Team 2
Distillery	1–0	Cliftonville
Moyola Park	2–0	Alexander
Wellington Park	w/o	Dublin Association
Ulster	bye	

=== Semi-finals ===
Team 1	Score	Team 2
Distillery	3–0	Ulster
Wellington Park	4–2	Moyola Park

=== Final ===
19 April 1884

Distillery	5–0	Wellington Park
Hogg; Stewart; S. Johnston	Report

Ulster Cricket Ground, Belfast
Attendance: 2,000
