= William Morrow (footballer) =

Irish sportsman

Bill Morrow
Personal information
- Full name: William Morrow
- Date of birth: 15 November 1851
- Date of death: 22 January 1922 (aged 70)
- Position: Midfielder

Senior career*
Years	Team	Apps	(Gls)
1880–1881	Ulster		
1881–1885	Moyola Park		

International career
1883–1884	Ireland	3	(1)
- * Club domestic league appearances and goals

William Morrow (15 November 1851 – 22 January 1922) was an Irish footballer who played in the 1880s, most notably for Moyola Park. He was a winner of the inaugural Irish Cup and earned three caps for Ireland.

After initially playing rugby and later cricket in Mountpottinger, Morrow took up football late, and was about thirty years old when he signed for Ulster F.C., his first club. After a year at Ballynafeigh Park he signed for Moyola Park in 1881. With the Castledawson side he would win the inaugural Irish Cup in 1881. Morrow was team captain and the only goalscorer in the final, a 1-0 win against Belfast side Cliftonville, netting the 75th minute winner at the Cliftonville Cricket Ground, Belfast in front of 1,500 spectators.

Morrow played three times for Ireland making his debut February 1883 in a 7-0 loss away to England at the Aigburth Cricket Ground. He would make history a month later when he scored the equalising goal that secured Ireland’s first ever draw, 1-1 against Wales at Ballynafeigh Park. A year later, he earned the last of his three caps, playing in a 5-0 loss to Scotland.

Morrow later became a referee, and officiated an international between England and Scotland in 1891.

== Honours ==
Moyola Park

- Irish Cup (1): 1880-81
