= 1884 in association football =

The following are the association football events of the year 1884 throughout the world.

== Events ==
=== England ===
- Nantwich Town F.C.
- Derby County F.C.
- Leicester City F.C.
- Lincoln City F.C.
- Prescot Cables F.C.
- Tranmere Rovers F.C.
- Wakefield F.C.

=== Scotland ===
- Stenhousemuir F.C.

== Domestic cups ==
Nation	Tournament	Winner	Score	Runner-up	Venue	Title	Last title won
England	1883–84 FA Cup	Blackburn Rovers	2-1	(Scotland) Queen's Park	Kennington Oval	1st	None
Ireland	1883–84 Irish Cup	Distillery	5-0	Wellington Park	Ulster Cricket Ground	1st	None
Scotland	1883–84 Scottish Cup	Queen's Park	(awarded to Queen's Park due to Vale of Leven not appearing)	Vale of Leven	Cathkin Park	7th	1882
Wales	1883–84 Welsh Cup	Oswestry White Stars	1-0 (Replay following 0-0 draw)	Druids	Racecourse Ground	1st	None

== International tournaments ==
- 1883–84 British Home Championship (26 January – 29 March 1884)

Pos	Team	Pld	W	D	L	GF	GA	GD	Pts
1	Scotland (C)	3	3	0	0	10	1	+9	6
2	England	3	2	0	1	12	2	+10	4
3	Wales	3	1	0	2	7	8	−1	2
4	Ireland	3	0	0	3	1	19	−18	0

Rules for classification: 1) Points. The points system worked as follows: 2 points for a win and 1 point for a draw.
(C) Champions

== Births ==
- 1 January – José Quirante (d. 1964), Spanish midfielder and coach associated with both FC Barcelona and Real Madrid.
- April – Billy Bradshaw (d. unknown), England international half-back in four matches (1910–1913).
- 3 May – Willie Reid (d. 1966), Scotland international forward in nine matches (1911–1914), scoring four goals.
- 31 May – Frank Bradshaw (d. 1962), England international forward in one match (1908), scoring three goals and so one of the five England players to score a hat-trick on his only international appearance.
- 6 June – Tim Williamson (d. 1943), England international goalkeeper in seven matches (1905–1913).
- 23 June – Val Harris (d. 1963), Ireland international in twenty matches (1906–1914); club career with Shelbourne and Everton.
- 18 July - Jan Košek (d. 1927), Bohemian international forward in 3 matches scoring 4 goals (1906–1908); club career mainly with Slavia Prague, scoring 819 goals in 302 games.
- 12 October – Jock Rutherford (d. 1963), England international forward in eleven matches (1904–1908), scoring three goals.
- 8 December – Wilf Low (d. 1933), Scotland international half-back in five matches (1911–1920).
