= Downshire Lawn Tennis Tournament =

Defunct tennis tournament
- Founded: 1881; 144 years ago
- Abolished: 1896; 129 years ago
- Location: Cliftonville Cricket Club Ground, Belfast, Northern Ireland
- Venue: Downshire Archery and Lawn Tennis Club
- Surface: Grass

The Downshire Lawn Tennis Tournament was late Victorian era men's and women's grass court tennis event established in 1881 that ran until at least 1896. The tournament was organised by the Downshire Archery and Lawn Tennis Club, and usually held Cliftonville Cricket Club Ground, Belfast, Northern Ireland.

== History ==
The Downshire Lawn Tennis Tournament was a men's and women's grass court tennis event established in 1881, that ran until at least 1896. The tournament was organised by the Downshire Archery and Lawn Tennis Club, and usually held at the Cliftonville Cricket Club Ground, Belfast, Northern Ireland.

== See also ==
- Cliftonville Cricket Club
