= 1881–82 Irish Cup =

Tournament details
- Country: Ireland
- Date: 7 January 1882 – 13 May 1882
- Teams: 13

Final positions
- Champions: Queen's Island (1st win)
- Runners-up: Cliftonville

Tournament statistics
- Matches played: 19
- Goals scored: 45 (2.37 per match)

The 1881–82 Irish Cup was the 2nd edition of the Irish Cup, the premier knock-out cup competition in Irish football. The competition began in January 1882 with the first round and ended on 13 May 1882 with the final. Queen's Island won the tournament for the only time in their brief history, including eliminating the holders Moyola Park in the quarter-finals.

The final was played between Queen's Island and Cliftonville and ended in a 1–0 victory to the former.

== Results ==
=== First round ===
Team 1	Score	Team 2
Alexander	0–0	Moyola Park
Cliftonville	2–2	Avoniel
Ligoniel	0–3	Banbridge
Malone	0–4	Knock
Oldpark	0–5	Queen's Island
Strabane	0–1	Castlederg

==== Replays ====
Team 1	Score	Team 2
Cliftonville	0–0	Avoniel
Alexander	2–3	Moyola Park

Cliftonville and Avoniel advanced to the next round.

=== Quarter-finals ===
Team 1	Score	Team 2
Avoniel	1–1	Distillery
Castlederg	2–1	Banbridge
Knock	0–2	Cliftonville
Moyola Park	1–1	Queen's Island

==== Replays ====
Team 1	Score	Team 2
Avoniel	3–1	Distillery
Moyola Park	1–2	Queen's Island

A second replay was ordered between Avoniel and Distillery after protests that the match was ended four minutes early.

==== Second replay ====
Team 1	Score	Team 2
Avoniel	1–0	Distillery

=== Semi-finals ===
Team 1	Score	Team 2
Cliftonville	1–1	Avoniel
Queen's Island	w/o	Castlederg

Queen's Island advanced after Castlederg withdrew.

==== Replay ====
Team 1	Score	Team 2
Cliftonville	0–0	Avoniel

==== Second replay ====
Team 1	Score	Team 2
Cliftonville	2–0	Avoniel

=== Final ===
13 May 1882
15:30

Queen's Island	1–0	Cliftonville
Stewart	Report

Ulster Cricket Ground, Belfast
