= 1921–22 Alhambra Cup =

Tournament details
- Country: Northern Ireland
- Teams: 6

Final positions
- Champions: Linfield (1st title)
- Runners-up: Cliftonville

Tournament statistics
- Matches played: 5
- Goals scored: 6 (1.2 per match)

The 1921–22 Alhambra Cup was the inaugural edition of the Alhambra Cup, a cup competition in Northern Irish football.

The tournament was won by Linfield for the first time, defeating Cliftonville 1–0 in the final at The Oval.

== Results ==
=== First round ===
| Team 1 | Score | Team 2 |
|---|---|---|
| Cliftonville | 2–0 | Glenavon |
| Distillery | 1–0 | Queen's Island |
| Glentoran | bye | |
| Linfield | bye | |

=== Semi-finals ===
| Team 1 | Score | Team 2 |
|---|---|---|
| Cliftonville | 1–0 | Distillery |
| Linfield | 1–0 | Glentoran |

=== Final ===
7 September 1921

| Linfield | 1–0 | Cliftonville |
|---|---|---|
| Scott 33' | Report |

The Oval, Belfast
Referee: W. Cowan
