= Wellington Park F.C. =

Wellington Park F.C. may refer to:

- Wellington Park F.C. (Greenock), a former association football club from Greenock, Renfrewshire, Scotland which existed from 1876 to 1882.
- Wellington Park F.C. (Northern Ireland), a former association football club from Belfast, Northern Ireland which existed from 1882 to 1887.
