= 2008–09 County Antrim Shield =

Tournament details
- Country: Northern Ireland
- Teams: 16

Final positions
- Champions: Cliftonville (8th win)
- Runners-up: Linfield

Tournament statistics
- Matches played: 15
- Goals scored: 56 (3.73 per match)

The 2008–09 County Antrim Shield was the 120th edition of the County Antrim Shield, a cup competition in Northern Irish football.

Cliftonville won the tournament for the 8th time, defeating Linfield 2–1 in the final.

== Results ==
=== First round ===
Team 1	Score	Team 2
Ballymena United	3–0	Ballyclare Comrades
Bangor	0–1	Donegal Celtic
Cliftonville	3–0	Brantwood
Crusaders	2–0	Dromara Village
Glentoran	6–1	Newington Youth
Larne	3–0	Dundela
Linfield	7–1	Harland & Wolff Welders
Lisburn Distillery	3–0	Wakehurst

=== Quarter-finals ===
Team 1	Score	Team 2
Cliftonville	3–2	Donegal Celtic
Crusaders	1–0	Larne
Glentoran	6–1	Ballymena United
Lisburn Distillery	0–1	Linfield

=== Semi-finals ===
Team 1	Score	Team 2
Cliftonville	3–0	Glentoran
Linfield	3–3 (a.e.t.) (3–0 p)	Crusaders

=== Final ===
4 November 2008

Linfield	1–2	Cliftonville
Miskimmin 79'		C. Scannell 64'; Murphy 68' (pen.)

Windsor Park, Belfast
Referee: David Malcolm (Bangor)
