= James Edgar =

James Edgar may refer to:

- James Edgar (Jacobite) (1688–1764), Scottish Jacobite official
- James David Edgar (1841–1899), Canadian politician
- James Edgar (entrepreneur) (1843–1909), Scottish-American founder of Edgar Department Stores and the first department store Santa Claus
- James Douglas Edgar (1884–1921), English professional golfer
- Jim Edgar (1946–2025), American politician
- Jimmy Edgar (born 1983), American electronic music artist
- James Edgar (footballer) (1882–?), English footballer
- James Edgar (sprinter) (1930–?), Scottish sprinter
