= George Wilson Cup =

- Organiser(s): Irish Football Association
- Founded: 1953
- Abolished: 2019
- Region: Northern Ireland
- Last champions: Knockbreda Reserves (2018–19)
- Most championships: Glentoran II (11 titles)

The George Wilson Memorial Cup is a competition open to the reserve football teams of member clubs of the NIFL Premiership. Initially it was open to all members of the B Division, both "attached and unattached" (i.e. reserve sides and independent intermediate clubs), but since 1977–78 it has been limited to reserve sides only. It has not been played since 2019.

From the 2025-26 season the trophy has been awarded to the winners of the NIFL Championship.

== History ==
Founded in the 1952–53 season in memory of Crusaders official, George Wilson the final has been traditionally held at Crusaders' home ground Seaview (with a few exceptions when matches have been held at Taylor's Avenue (Carrickfergus), Ballymena Showgrounds and Mourneview Park). Appropriately, the first winners were Crusaders Reserves.

The format has varied over the years between league format, straight knockout and group format.

== Past winners ==
- 1952–53 Crusaders Reserves
- 1953–54 Linfield Swifts
- 1954–55 Coleraine Reserves
- 1955–56 Ballyclare Comrades
- 1956–57 Distillery II
- 1957–58 Ards II
- 1958–59 Larne
- 1959–60 Larne
- 1960–61 Ballyclare Comrades
- 1961–62 Linfield Swifts
- 1962–63 Ballyclare Comrades
- 1963–64 Glenavon Reserves
- 1964–65 Dundela
- 1965–66 Glentoran II
- 1966–67 Glentoran II
- 1967–68 Dundela
- 1968–69 Larne
- 1969–70 not played
- 1970–71 Larne
- 1971–72 Dundela
- 1972–73 Brantwood
- 1973–74 Dungannon Swifts
- 1974–75 Dundela
- 1975–76 Limavady United
- 1976–77 Banbridge Town F.C.
- 1977–78 Linfield Swifts
- 1978–79 Larne Olympic
- 1979–80 Glentoran II
- 1980–81 Linfield Swifts
- 1981–82 Distillery II
- 1982–83 Ards II
- 1983–84 Linfield Swifts
- 1984–85 Linfield Swifts
- 1985–86 Coleraine Reserves
- 1986–87 Glentoran II
- 1987–88 Distillery II
- 1988–89 Linfield Swifts
- 1989–90 Ballymena United Reserves
- 1990–91 Ballymena United Reserves
- 1991–92 Coleraine Reserves
- 1992–93 Bangor Reserves
- 1993–94 Ballyclare Comrades Reserves
- 1994–95 Bangor Reserves
- 1995–96 Coleraine Reserves
- 1996–97 Portadown Reserves
- 1997–98 Bangor Reserves
- 1998–99 Linfield Swifts
- 1999–00 Cliftonville Olympic
- 2000–01 Glentoran II
- 2001–02 Glentoran II
- 2002–03 Glentoran II
- 2003–04 Dungannon Swifts Reserves
- 2004–05 Glentoran II
- 2005–06 Dungannon Swifts Reserves
- 2006–07 Crusaders Reserves
- 2007–08 Cliftonville Olympic
- 2008–09 Linfield Swifts
- 2009–10 Glentoran II
- 2010–11 Linfield Swifts
- 2011–12 Glentoran II
- 2012–13 Cliftonville Olympic
- 2013–14 Glentoran II
- 2014–15 Crusaders Reserves
- 2015–16 Cliftonville Olympic
- 2016–17 Cliftonville Olympic
- 2017–18 Harland & Wolff Welders U20
- 2018–19 Knockbreda Reserves
- 2019–20 not played due to coronavirus pandemic

== Performance by club ==
Team	No. of wins	Winning years
Glentoran II	11	1965–66, 1966–67, 1979–80, 1986–87, 2000–01, 2001–02, 2002–03, 2004–05, 2009–10, 2011–12, 2013–14
Linfield Swifts	10	1953–54, 1961–62, 1976–77, 1980–81, 1983–84, 1984–85, 1988–89, 1998–99, 2008–09, 2010–11
Cliftonville Olympic	5	1999–00, 2007–08, 2012–13, 2015–16, 2016–17
Coleraine Reserves	4	1954–55, 1985–86, 1991–92, 1995–96
Dundela	4	1964–65, 1967–68, 1971–72, 1974–75
Larne	4	1958–59, 1959–60, 1968–69, 1970–71
Ballyclare Comrades	3	1955–56, 1960–61, 1962–63
Bangor Reserves	3	1992–93, 1994–95, 1997–98
Crusaders Reserves	3	1952–53, 2006–07, 2014–15
Distillery II	3	1956–57, 1981–82, 1987–88
Ards II	2	1957–58, 1982–83
Ballymena United Reserves	2	1989–90, 1990–91
Dungannon Swifts Reserves	2	2003–04, 2005–06
Larne Olympic	2	1977–78, 1978–79
Ballyclare Comrades Reserves	1	1993–94
Brantwood	1	1972–73
Dungannon Swifts	1	1973–74
Glenavon Reserves	1	1963–64
Harland & Wolff Welders U20	1	2017–18
Knockbreda Reserves	1	2018–19
Limavady United	1	1975–76
Portadown Reserves	1	1996–97

== See also ==
- IFA Reserve League
