= List of Cliftonville F.C. seasons =

This is a list of seasons played by Cliftonville in Northern Irish and European football.

== Seasons ==
Season	League										Irish Cup	League Cup	Co Antrim Shield	Other Competitions		Europe		Top goalscorer(s)	
Season	Division	P	W	D	L	F	A	+/-	Pts	Position	Irish Cup	League Cup	Co Antrim Shield	Other Competitions		Europe		Name	Goals
2003-04	Premier League	30	6	8	16	27	45	-18	26	15th	R6	Winners	QF						
2004-05	Premier League	30	9	7	14	29	44	-15	34	11th	R5	SF	SF						
2005-06	Premier League	30	13	8	9	45	35	10	47	5th	R5	Grp	QF						
2006-07	Premier League	30	18	7	5	47	26	21	61	3rd	SF	Runners-up	Winners						
2007-08	Premier League	30	18	6	6	55	32	23	60	3rd	SF	QF	SF	Setanta Sports Cup	Grp	UEFA Intertoto Cup	2R		
2008-09	Premiership	38	12	14	12	52	48	4	50	6th	Runners-up	QF	Winners			UEFA Cup	1QR		
2009-10	Premiership	38	21	6	11	69	42	27	69	2nd	R6	QF	SF	Setanta Sports Cup	Grp			George McMullan	17
2010-11	Premiership	38	26	7	5	60	56	4	58	4th	QF	R5	QF	Setanta Sports Cup	SF	UEFA Europa League	QR3		
2011-12	Premiership	38	21	6	11	83	62	21	69	3rd	R6	QF	Winners	Setanta Sports Cup	QF	UEFA Europa League	QR1	Chris Scannell	17
2012-13	Premiership	38	29	4	5	95	38	57	91	1st	Runners-up	Winners	R1	Setanta Sports Cup	R1	UEFA Europa League	QR1	Liam Boyce	29
2013-14	Premiership	38	26	7	5	88	39	49	85	1st	R5	Winners	SF	Setanta Sports Cup	Withdrew	UEFA Champions League	2QR	Joe Gormley	27
2014-15	Premiership	38	16	13	9	71	47	24	61	5th	R6	Winners	Winners	NIFL Charity Shield	Winners	UEFA Champions League	2QR	Joe Gormley	31
2015-16	Premiership											Winners	QF						
