= Alhambra Cup =

Football competition in Ireland (1921–23)

- Organiser(s): Irish Football Association
- Founded: 1921
- Abolished: 1922
- Region: Northern Ireland
- Most championships: Cliftonville; Linfield (1 title each)

The Alhambra Cup was a football competition played for two seasons between clubs in the Irish League in 1921–22 and 1922–23. Six teams entered each season: Cliftonville, Distillery, Glenavon, Glentoran, Linfield and Queen's Island.

== Final results ==
| Season | Date | Winner | Score | Runner-up | Venue |
|---|---|---|---|---|---|
| 1921–22 | 7 September 1921 | Linfield | 1 – 0 | Cliftonville | The Oval, Belfast |
| 1922–23 | 30 August 1922 | Cliftonville | 2 – 0 | Linfield | The Oval, Belfast |

== Sources ==
- Malcolm Brodie, "100 Years of Irish Football", Blackstaff Press, Belfast (1980)
