= 1882–83 Irish Cup =

Tournament details
- Country: Ireland
- Date: 16 December 1882 – 5 May 1883
- Teams: 18

Final positions
- Champions: Cliftonville (1st title)
- Runners-up: Ulster

Tournament statistics
- Matches played: 18
- Goals scored: 81 (4.5 per match)

The 1882–83 Irish Cup was the 3rd edition of the Irish Cup, the premier knock-out cup competition in Irish football. The competition ended on 5 May 1883 with the final.

Cliftonville won the tournament for the 1st time, defeating Ulster 5–0 in the final. The holders Queen's Island were eliminated in the semi-finals.

== Results ==
=== First round ===
| Team 1 | Score | Team 2 |
|---|---|---|
| Oldpark | 2–6 | Distillery |
| Down Athletics | w/o | Wellington Park |
| Avoniel | 3–5 | Ligoniel |
| Queen's Island | 4–0 | Mount Avon |
| Cliftonville | w/o | Chichester Park |
| Ulster | 10–2 | Malone |
| Alexander | 5–2 | Limavady Wanderers |
| Strabane | w/o | Castlederg |
| Glentoran | bye | |
| Moyola Park | bye | |

=== Second round ===
| Team 1 | Score | Team 2 |
|---|---|---|
| Distillery | 4–0 | Wellington Park |
| Ligoniel | 2–7 | Cliftonville |
| Ulster | 9–0 | Glentoran |
| Alexander | 0–0 | Moyola Park |
| Queen's Island | bye | |
| Strabane | bye | |

==== Replay ====
| Team 1 | Score | Team 2 |
|---|---|---|
| Alexander | 0–0^{1} | Moyola Park |

^{1} After this match the decision was taken to grant both teams a bye into the third round.

=== Third round ===
| Team 1 | Score | Team 2 |
|---|---|---|
| Moyola Park | 0–1 (a.e.t.) | Cliftonville |
| Alexander | 0–0^{1} | Strabane |
| Distillery | 1–1^{2} | Queen's Island |
| Ulster | bye | |

- ^{1} Alexander originally won the match 1-0 which was changed to 0–0 after a protest.
- ^{2} Queen's Island originally won the match 2-1 which was changed to 1–1 after a protest.

==== Replays ====
| Team 1 | Score | Team 2 |
|---|---|---|
| Alexander | 1–0 | Strabane |
| Distillery | 0–1 | Queen's Island |

=== Semi-finals ===
| Team 1 | Score | Team 2 |
|---|---|---|
| Cliftonville | 7–0 | Alexander |
| Ulster | 4–1 | Queen's Island |

=== Final ===
5 May 1883

| Cliftonville | 5–0 | Ulster |
|---|---|---|
| J Potts; McWha; Davison | Report |

Bloomfield Ground, Belfast
Attendance: 2,000
