= Queen's Island F.C. (1881) =

- Full name: Queen's Island Football Club
- Nickname: Queen's
- Founded: 1881
- Dissolved: 1884
- Ground: Bloomfield

Queen's Island Football Club is a defunct Irish association football club. They were based in Queen's Island, Belfast.

== History ==
The club was formed on 22 August 1881 out of a cricket club run by engineers at the Queen's Island works in Belfast. Most of the initial members were Scots and "hopes [were] entertained for a very successful season".

The club's first game against external opposition followed in October 1881, against the Avoniel club, and was a 3–3 draw. The club did not have a home ground ready until February 1882, so had to play its initial games away from home, including its first Irish Cup tie with Oldpark. Playing away did not prove a disadvantage as the club won by 5 goals to 0.

In the second round of the Cup, the club was drawn to visit the holders Moyola Park; Queen's won 2–1 in a replay at Bloomfield, in front of 500 spectators, helped by an injury to one of Moyola's forwards, which forced him to play in goal for part of the game. After walking over Castlederg in the semi-final, Queen's beat Cliftonville in the final, at Ulster F.C.'s Ormeau Road ground, by the only goal of the game. Three of the XI were from the Beith football club.

The club was not beaten in the 1882–83 season until going down 3–0 at home in a friendly against Hamilton Academical, and reached the semi-finals of the Irish Cup. However the creation of more clubs and the rising popularity of football increased the level of competition and Queen's Island, as a works side, was unable to recruit widely enough. The club was without 8 of its regular players for a friendly match in December 1883 against the Y.M.C.A., and, after losing to Wellington Park in the second round of the 1883–84 Irish Cup, the only fixture recorded is a benefit match against Distillery for a Queen's Island shipbuilding employee.

In January 1886, there was a one-off revival of a "Queen's Island" team, again to play Distillery in a friendly to raise funds for a worker who was suing Harland & Wolff for injuries during his employment. There are two fixtures recorded for a Queen's Island in 1888 and 1889 (both at Templepatrick) but these almost certainly relate to another team. A later club of the same name was formed in 1920 and was a member of the Irish Football League from 1921 to 1929.

== Grounds ==
The club did not originally have a home ground; from February 1882 it was able to use Bloomfield, the ground of Knock F.C., and Queen's christened it with a 10–0 win over Distillery on 4 February 1882.

For its final season, the club moved to Ashfield Park.

== Honours ==
=== Senior honours ===
- Irish Cup
  - Winners (1): 1881–82
