= 2019–20 County Antrim Shield =

Tournament details
- Country: Northern Ireland
- Teams: 16

Final positions
- Champions: Cliftonville (11th win)
- Runners-up: Ballymena United

Tournament statistics
- Matches played: 15
- Goals scored: 57 (3.8 per match)

The 2019–20 County Antrim Shield was the 131st edition of the County Antrim Shield, a cup competition in Northern Irish football.

Cliftonville won the tournament for the 11th time, defeating Ballymena United 2–1 in the final.

== Results ==
=== First round ===
Team 1	Score	Team 2
Ards	5–0	Queen's University
Ballymena United	2–1	Dundela
Carrick Rangers	1–2	Harland & Wolff Welders
Cliftonville	4–0	Knockbreda
Crusaders	8–1	Sirocco Works
Glentoran	3–1	Ballyclare Comrades
Larne	3–0	PSNI
Linfield	5–1	East Belfast

=== Quarter-finals ===
Team 1	Score	Team 2
Ards	0–1	Harland & Wolff Welders
Ballymena United	1–1 (a.e.t.) (3–2 p)	Crusaders
Glentoran	3–2 (a.e.t.)	Larne
Linfield	2–2 (a.e.t.)(3–4 p)	Cliftonville

=== Semi-finals ===
Team 1	Score	Team 2
Ballymena United	4–0	Harland & Wolff Welders
Cliftonville	1–0	Glentoran

=== Final ===
21 January 2020

Cliftonville	2–1	Ballymena United
Maguire 90+6'; Curran 90+7'	Report	Millar 54'

Windsor Park, Belfast
Referee: Raymond Crangle
