= 1996–97 County Antrim Shield =

Tournament details
- Country: Northern Ireland
- Teams: 16

Final positions
- Champions: Cliftonville (6th win)
- Runners-up: Ballymena United

Tournament statistics
- Matches played: 15
- Goals scored: 36 (2.4 per match)

The 1996–97 County Antrim Shield was the 108th edition of the County Antrim Shield, a cup competition in Northern Irish football.

Cliftonville won the tournament for the 6th time, defeating Ballymena United 5–4 on penalties after the final finished 0-0. This was the second time the final had been played, after the original match was abandoned after 66 minutes due to crowd disorder. For the 11th year running three clubs from County Armagh competed (Glenavon, Newry Town and Portadown).

== Results ==
=== First round ===
Team 1	Score	Team 2
Ballyclare Comrades	0–1	Chimney Corner
Ballymena United	2–0	Carrick Rangers
Bangor	0–3	Linfield
Cliftonville	1–0	Ards
Crusaders	8–0	Comber Recreation
Larne	0–1 (a.e.t.)	Distillery
Newry Town	0–5	Glentoran
Portadown	2–0	Glenavon

=== Quarter-finals ===
Team 1	Score	Team 2
Ballymena United	2–0	Chimney Corner
Crusaders	0–0 (a.e.t.) (7–6 p)	Distillery
Glentoran	0–0 (a.e.t.) (4–5 p)	Cliftonville
Portadown	3–2	Linfield

=== Semi-finals ===
Team 1	Score	Team 2
Ballymena United	2–1	Portadown
Cliftonville	2–1	Crusaders

=== Final ===
25 February 1997

Cliftonville	0–0 (a.e.t.)	Ballymena United
		McConnell (red card) 100'
Penalties
Stokes (penalty scored); Small (penalty scored); O'Connor (penalty scored); Hill (penalty scored); McCann (penalty scored)	5–4	(penalty scored) Allen; (penalty scored) Patton; (penalty scored) Smyth; (penalty scored) Bustard; (penalty missed) Murray

Windsor Park, Belfast
Referee: Alan Snoddy (Carryduff)
