= 2014–15 County Antrim Shield =

Tournament details
- Country: Northern Ireland
- Teams: 16

Final positions
- Champions: Cliftonville (10th win)
- Runners-up: Bangor

Tournament statistics
- Matches played: 14
- Goals scored: 62 (4.43 per match)

The 2014–15 County Antrim Shield was the 126th edition of the County Antrim Shield, a cup competition in Northern Irish football.

Cliftonville won the tournament for the 10th time, defeating Bangor 1–0 in the final.

== Results ==
=== First round ===
Team 1	Score	Team 2
Ards	9–0	Ballymoney United
Ballyclare Comrades	2–5	Cliftonville
Bangor	6–0	Glebe Rangers
Carrick Rangers	w/o	Crusaders
Donegal Celtic	1–3 (a.e.t.)	Ballymena United
Glentoran	2–1	Larne
Linfield	5–0	Dundela
Newington Youth	2–1	Immaculata

=== Quarter-finals ===
Team 1	Score	Team 2
Ards	2–0	Newington Youth
Cliftonville	4–3	Ballymena United
Glentoran	1–2	Bangor
Linfield	2–4	Crusaders

=== Semi-finals ===
Team 1	Score	Team 2
Ards	1–2 (a.e.t.)	Cliftonville
Crusaders	1–2	Bangor

=== Final ===
13 January 2015

Cliftonville	1–0	Bangor
Winchester 15'	Report

Solitude, Belfast
Attendance: 2,700
Referee: Ross Dunlop (Carrickfergus)
