= 1922–23 Alhambra Cup =

Tournament details
- Country: Northern Ireland
- Teams: 6

Final positions
- Champions: Cliftonville (1st title)
- Runners-up: Linfield

Tournament statistics
- Matches played: 6
- Goals scored: 20 (3.33 per match)

The 1922–23 Alhambra Cup was the second and final edition of the Alhambra Cup, a cup competition in Northern Irish football.

The tournament was won by Cliftonville for the first time, defeating Linfield 2–0 in the final at The Oval.

== Results ==
=== First round ===
Team 1	Score	Team 2
Glentoran	2–3	Distillery
Linfield	2–0	Queen's Island
Cliftonville	bye	
Glenavon	bye	

=== Semi-finals ===
Team 1	Score	Team 2
Cliftonville	1–1	Glenavon
Linfield	3–2	Distillery

==== Replay ====
Team 1	Score	Team 2
Cliftonville	3–1	Glenavon

=== Final ===
30 August 1922

Cliftonville	2–0	Linfield
Collins; Andrews	Report

The Oval, Belfast
