= David Martin (football administrator) =

- Born: David Martin; 22 June 1953 (age 72); Northern Ireland, United Kingdom
- Occupations: Member, FIFA Council

David Martin (born 22 June 1953), is a Northern Irish football official who is currently a member of the FIFA Council elected since 2021.

Martin was president of the Irish Football Association, having the role from 2016 until 2021.

Martin previously ran for the FIFA Council in 2019, only defeated by Greg Clarke. After Clarke's resignation, in April 2021, he was elected to the FIFA Council, receiving 48 of 55 votes.
