= NIFL Premiership Development League =

- Founded: 2016; 2013–2016 (as NIFL Reserve League); 2003–2013 (as IFA Reserve League); 1999–2003 (as Irish League Reserve League); 1977–1999 (as Irish League B Division Section 2)
- Country: Northern Ireland
- Divisions: 1
- Number of clubs: 12
- Domestic cup(s): IFA Intermediate Cup; George Wilson Cup
- Current champions: Coleraine Reserves (2023–24)
- Most championships: Linfield Swifts (21 titles)

The NIFL Development League (prior to 2016, the NIFL Reserve League) is an intermediate Association football league in Northern Ireland consisting of the reserve teams of the twelve NIFL Premiership clubs.

== Current members (2022–23) ==
- Ballymena United Reserves
- Carrick Rangers Reserves
- Cliftonville Olympic
- Coleraine Reserves
- Crusaders Reserves
- Dungannon Swifts Reserves
- Glenavon Reserves
- Glentoran II
- Larne Olympic
- Linfield Swifts
- Newry City Reserves
- Portadown Reserves

== History ==
The NIFL Development League is the successor to the NIFL Reserve League, which in turn was the successor to the Irish League B Division Section 2 which was formed in 1977, when the B Division split into two sections: Section 1 for intermediate clubs and the other for the reserve teams of senior clubs. Since the foundation of the B Division in 1951, these two categories of teams had competed together. In 1999, Section 1 of the B Division was renamed the Irish League Second Division and Section 2 became the Irish League Reserve League. In 2003, on the formation of the Irish Premier League, the IFA took direct control and the league was renamed the IFA Reserve League. In 2013, the Northern Ireland Football League took over, and the league was again renamed, to the NIFL Reserve League. In 2016, it became the NIFL Development League, with an age restriction imposed on players.

== List of champions ==
=== Irish League B Division Section 2 ===
| Season | Champions |
|---|---|
| 1977–78 | Linfield Swifts |
| 1978–79 | Linfield Swifts |
| 1979–80 | Linfield Swifts |
| 1980–81 | Cliftonville Olympic |
| 1981–82 | Larne Olympic |
| 1982–83 | Linfield Swifts |
| 1983–84 | Linfield Swifts |
| 1984–85 | Linfield Swifts |
| 1985–86 | Glentoran II |
| 1986–87 | Glentoran II |
| 1987–88 | Linfield Swifts |
| 1988–89 | Linfield Swifts |
| 1989–90 | Glentoran II |
| 1990–91 | Linfield Swifts |
| 1991–92 | Linfield Swifts |
| 1992–93 | Glentoran II |
| 1993–94 | Bangor Reserves |
| 1994–95 | Bangor Reserves |
| 1995–96 | Glentoran II |
| 1996–97 | Crusaders Reserves |
| 1997–98 | Glentoran II |
| 1998–99 | Linfield Swifts |

=== Irish League Reserve League ===
| Season | Champions |
|---|---|
| 1999–00 | Linfield Swifts |
| 2000–01 | Cliftonville Olympic |
| 2001–02 | Glentoran II |
| 2002–03 | Glentoran II |

=== IFA Reserve League ===
| Season | Champions |
|---|---|
| 2003–04 | Linfield Swifts |
| 2004–05 | Linfield Swifts |
| 2005–06 | Dungannon Swifts Reserves |
| 2006–07 | Ballymena United Reserves |
| 2007–08 | Donegal Celtic Reserves |
| 2008–09 | Linfield Swifts |
| 2009–10 | Linfield Swifts |
| 2010–11 | Linfield Swifts |
| 2011–12 | Cliftonville Olympic |
| 2012–13 | Ballinamallard United II |

=== NIFL Reserve League ===
| Season | Champions |
|---|---|
| 2013–14 | Cliftonville Olympic |
| 2014–15 | Linfield Swifts |
| 2015–16 | Cliftonville Olympic |

=== NIFL Premiership Development League ===
| Season | Champions |
|---|---|
| 2016–17 | Linfield Swifts |
| 2017–18 | Linfield Swifts |
| 2018–19 | Linfield Swifts |
| 2019–20 | Cliftonville Olympic |
| 2020–21 | cancelled |
| 2021–22 | Crusaders Reserves |
| 2022–23 | Crusaders Reserves |
| 2023–24 | Coleraine Reserves |
| 2024–25 | Linfield Swifts |
| 2025–26 | Glentoran II |

== Summary of champions ==
| Team | Wins | Winning years |
|---|---|---|
| Linfield Swifts | 22 | 1977–78, 1978–79, 1979–80, 1982–83, 1983–84, 1984–85, 1987–88, 1988–89, 1990–91, 1991–92, 1998–99, 1999–00, 2003–04, 2004–05, 2008–09, 2009–10, 2010–11, 2014–15, 2016-17, 2017-18, 2018-19, 2024-25 |
| Glentoran II | 9 | 1985–86, 1986–87, 1989–90, 1992–93, 1995–96, 1997–98, 2001–02, 2002–03, 2025-26 |
| Cliftonville Olympic | 6 | 1980–81, 2000–01, 2011–12, 2013–14, 2015–16, 2019-20 |
| Crusaders Reserves | 3 | 1996–97, 2021–22, 2022–23 |
| Bangor Reserves | 2 | 1993–94, 1994–95 |
| Ballinamallard United II | 1 | 2012–13 |
| Ballymena United Reserves | 1 | 2006–07 |
| Coleraine Reserves | 1 | 2023–24 |
| Donegal Celtic Reserves | 1 | 2007–08 |
| Dungannon Swifts Reserves | 1 | 2005–06 |
| Larne Olympic | 1 | 1981–82 |

== See also ==
- George Wilson Cup
- NIFL Premiership
- NIFL Championship
- NIFL Premier Intermediate League
- Irish Intermediate Cup
- Northern Ireland football league system
