= Limavady Wanderers F.C. =

Limavady Wanderers C. & F.C.
- Full name: Limavady Wanderers Cricket and Football Club
- Nickname(s): the Wanderers
- Founded: 1882
- Dissolved: 1884
- Ground: Lisnakelly
- Secretary: R. J. Sherrard
- Captain: Joseph Sherrard

Limavady Wanderers was a former Irish football club from Limavady, County Londonderry.

== History ==
The club was founded out of the Limavady Wanderers Cricket Club. Its earliest recorded match, in October 1882, was against fellow Limavady side Alexander, and ended early as the Wanderers walked off in protest at a decision to allow an Alexander goal.

The clubs met again in the first round of the 1882–83; as the competition was drawn on regional grounds, and there were only three clubs in the county, one was given a bye, and the lot fell on Moyola Park; Alexander uncontroversially won the tie 5–2. The club only played three more matches in its first season, but won them all, and finished the year with a positive balance sheet.

The two Limavady sides met again in the 1883–84 Irish Cup, this time in the second round as Wanderers had beaten the Victoria side (from the Royal Irish Constabulary stationed in Derry), and, as both sides had had 100% records in the season, a large crowd attended the Wanderers' ground, but Alexander was once more victorious.

The members of both Alexander and Wanderers decided to merge the two sides in 1884, dissatisfied with continually meeting in Cup competitions and not being able to put up a stronger opposition to clubs from Belfast. The merged club was simply called Limavady F.C.; although the original idea was to have the united club as a competition representative, allowing the two progenitor clubs to maintain an independent existence for friendlies, in fact the Wanderers only continued as a cricket club.

== Colours ==
There is no known source for the Wanderers' colours, but, as Alexander wore blue and white jerseys, and the combined club wore blue, white, and red, it is possible that the Wanderers contributed the red to the ensemble.

== Ground ==
The club played at Lisnakelly, and practised at a field owned by George Cather J.P.
