= Mark Miskimmin =

Northern Irish footballer

Personal information
- Date of birth: 11 June 1988 (age 38)
- Place of birth: Belfast, Northern Ireland
- Position: Forward

Youth career
- ?-2008: Ballyclare Comrades

Senior career*
Years	Team	Apps	(Gls)
2008–2010	Linfield	11	(7)
2010–2012	Glenavon	65	(25)
2012–2013	Donegal Celtic	33	(16)
2013–2014	Glentoran	22	(15)
2014–2015	Coleraine	24	(16)
2015–2016	Carrick Rangers	9	(0)
Total		164	(33)
- * Club domestic league appearances and goals

Mark Miskimmin (born 11 June 1988) is a Northern Irish retired footballer.

== Club career ==
=== Linfield ===
His first Linfield goals came as substitute against Institute at Windsor Park on 29 August 2008. He gained the reputation of supersub as he came off the bench a number of times and scored winning goals.

=== Glenavon ===
Miskimmin left Linfield in 2010 to sign for Glenavon where he played over 60 league matches in his two years at the club.

=== Donegal Celtic ===
He subsequently joined Donegal Celtic in 2012; the club were relegated at the end of his first full season.

=== Glentoran ===
On 2 June 2013 Miskimmin signed for East Belfast side Glentoran as a replacement for Andrew Waterworth and went on to make 25 league appearances for the club.

=== Coleraine ===
In the summer of 2014 Miskimmin left Glentoran, who had a mass exodus of players leave due to the uncertain future of the club. He joined Coleraine where he spent one season making 24 appearances, scoring four goals in the league in one season at the club before moving on.

=== Carrick Rangers ===
In July 2015 Miskimmin signed for Carrick Rangers who were newly promoted to the NIFL Premiership.
