= 2006–07 County Antrim Shield =

Tournament details
- Country: Northern Ireland
- Teams: 16

Final positions
- Champions: Cliftonville (7th win)
- Runners-up: Lisburn Distillery

Tournament statistics
- Matches played: 15
- Goals scored: 53 (3.53 per match)

The 2006–07 County Antrim Shield was the 118th edition of the County Antrim Shield, a cup competition in Northern Irish football.

Cliftonville won the tournament for the 7th time, defeating Lisburn Distillery 2–1 in the final.

== Results ==
=== First round ===
Team 1	Score	Team 2
Ballymena United	1–3	Dundela
Cliftonville	5–0	Brantwood
Crusaders	3–1	Ballyclare Comrades
Donegal Celtic	0–0 (a.e.t.) (4–2 p)	Carrick Rangers
Glentoran	3–1 (a.e.t.)	Bangor
Larne	0–2	Wakehurst
Linfield	6–0	Harland & Wolff Welders
Lisburn Distillery	2–0	Ards

=== Quarter-finals ===
Team 1	Score	Team 2
Cliftonville	2–0	Donegal Celtic
Glentoran	5–0	Wakehurst
Linfield	5–1	Crusaders
Lisburn Distillery	3–1	Dundela

=== Semi-finals ===
Team 1	Score	Team 2
Glentoran	1–2	Cliftonville
Linfield	1–2	Lisburn Distillery

=== Final ===
23 January 2007

Cliftonville	2–1	Lisburn Distillery
Holland 50', 67' (pen.)		Muir 37'

The Oval, Belfast
Referee: David Malcolm (Bangor)
