= Greenisland (cricket ground) =

Defunct cricket court

Coordinates: 54°42′03.33″N 5°52′49.63″W

- Location: Greenisland, Northern Ireland
- Country: Ireland
- Establishment: 1990
- End names
- Mountsandel End; Pavilion End
- As of 30 August 2011; Source: Ground profile

Greenisland was a cricket ground in Greenisland, Northern Ireland, used first by Greenisland Cricket Club, and then by Cliftonville Cricket Club from 1990 to 2007. Since 2008, the owners of the ground, Greenisland War Memorial Sports Club, replaced the cricket pitch with artificial hockey pitch and it has ceased to be a cricket venue.

The first recorded match on the ground was in 1967, when the Northern Cricket Union played an Ireland Development XI. In 2005, the ground hosted a List A match in the 2005 ICC Trophy between Bermuda and Denmark, which resulted in 93 run victory for Bermuda.
