= Cliftonville Cricket Ground =

Sports ground in Belfast, Northern Ireland

- Interactive map of Cliftonville Cricket Ground
- Location: Belfast, Northern Ireland
- Coordinates: 54.6169°N 5.9474°W

Tenants
- Cliftonville Cricket Club (1880–1972); Cliftonville F.C. (1879–1890)

Cliftonville Cricket Ground was a sports ground in Belfast, Northern Ireland. It was previously used for cricket, football and hockey, hosting a football international in 1887, but was closed following sectarian attacks in 1972. It is now owned by Belfast City Council and used for Gaelic games.

== History ==
Cliftonville Cricket Ground was the first home ground of Cliftonville F.C. However, after the creation of the Irish Football League in 1890 the club moved across the road to Solitude.

In 1880 Enfield Cricket Club moved to the ground and were renamed Cliftonville Cricket Club. They remained at the ground until 1972 when a series of sectarian attacks against members and the looting and burning of the clubhouse by a hostile mob led to them leaving.

It hosted the first Irish Cup final in 1881.

On 12 March 1887 the ground was used to host a British Home Championship football match between Ireland and Wales; the Irish won 4–1 with 4,000 in attendance, marking Ireland's first-ever win after five years of playing.

It was the home of Cliftonville Hockey Club until 1972.
