= Alexander F.C. =

- Full name: Alexander Football Club
- Founded: 1880
- Dissolved: 1884
- Ground: Scroggy Park
- Secretary: George Given
- Captain: T. Campbell
Home colours

Alexander Football Club is a former Irish football club from Limavady, County Londonderry.

== History ==
It was founded in 1880 by members of the Alexander Cricket Club, and was the first club to play in the town. Its earliest demonstration of the game to the public was between XIs chosen by the captain and secretary.

It was a founding member of the Irish Football Association, contributing to the purchase of the original Irish Cup. The club played in the early years of the Irish Cup, its best run being to the semi-final in 1882–83, where the club was heavily beaten by Cliftonville. Alexander was not helped by goalkeeper Rankin being injured trying to keep out the first goal after "some of his opponents leaped on him".

After a contentious defeat to Moyola Park in the quarter-final of the 1883–84 Irish Cup, the club withdrew in protest from the association. The withdrawal did not have any long-term effect, as, after the end of the season, Alexander merged with the Limavady Wanderers club to form Limavady F.C.

== Colours ==
The club wore blue and white.

== Ground ==
The club played at Scroggy Park, later used by the merged club.

== Notable players ==
Goalkeeper James Rankin earned an international cap while at the club. Two others - Orr Devine and Tom McLean - did so after the merger with the Wanderers.
