= James Edgar (footballer) =

English footballer

Personal information
- Full name: James Henry Edgar
- Date of birth: 1882
- Place of birth: Birtley, Northumberland, England
- Position: Winger

Senior career*
Years	Team	Apps	(Gls)
1904–1905	Birtley		
1905–1906	Sunderland	2	(0)
1906–1907	Birtley		
1907–1908	Hebburn Argyle		
1908–19??	Birtley		
- * Club domestic league appearances and goals

James Henry Edgar (born 1882) was an English professional footballer who played as winger for Sunderland.
