= Liam Beckett =

Northern Irish footballer and manager (born 1951)

Personal information
- Full name: William Alexander Beckett
- Date of birth: 17 July 1951 (age 75)
- Place of birth: Ballymoney, Northern Ireland
- Position: Full back

Senior career*
| Years | Team | Apps | (Gls) |
| 1971–1973 | Crusaders | | |
| 1973–1975 | Drogheda United | | |
| 1975–1979 | Coleraine | | |
| 1979 | Crusaders | | |
| 1979–1981 | Coleraine | | |

Managerial career
- 2000–2004: Ballymoney United
- 2004–2005: Cliftonville
- 2005–2008: Institute
- * Club domestic league appearances and goals

Liam Beckett MBE (born 17 July 1951) is a Northern Irish former football manager and player, who now works as a pundit and radio broadcaster.

== Playing career ==
Starting his career after a five-year plumbing apprenticeship, Beckett won an Irish League title and Carlsberg Cup with Crusaders, before transferring to Drogheda United in December 1973. In 1975 he moved to Coleraine, before re-joining Crusaders in October 1979. However, he only remained at the club for nine days, returning to Coleraine after buying licensed premises in his hometown of Ballymoney. His playing career ended with Coleraine in 1981.

== Managerial career ==
Beckett coached at Carrick Rangers in the early 1990s, before managing hometown club Ballymoney United. He later managed Cliftonville and Institute.

== Broadcasting career ==
Since leaving management behind, Beckett has frequently worked as a sports broadcaster on BBC Radio Ulster for Northern Irish football and motorcycle racing, particularly road racing. However, since July 2018, he has focused solely on football due to a spate of accidents in road racing, particularly the death of William Dunlop, given his closeness to the Dunlop racing family. Beckett had also worked as a mechanic and served as mentor for William's father Robert Dunlop.

== Honours ==
In December 2017, Beckett was awarded an MBE in the New Year Honours list for his service to the Northern Irish voluntary sector and sport.
