= Cliftonville Cricket Club =

Former sporting club, Northern Ireland

Cliftonville Academy
Personnel
- Captain: "Big fat" Marty

Team information
- Founded: 1870 (merged with Academy 2017)
- Home ground: Castle Grounds

Cliftonville Cricket Club was a cricket club in Northern Ireland, playing in the NCU Senior League.

The club was formed as Enfield in 1870, using a pitch in Clifton Park, now Clifton Park Avenue in north Belfast, disbanded in 1873, and reformed in 1874. In 1880, the club adopted its present name and moved to the Cliftonville Cricket Ground on the Cliftonville Road, where it played until 1972. In that year, the club was forced to vacate the ground after a series of sectarian attacks against members and the looting and burning of the clubhouse by a hostile mob. The 1973 season was played at Mossley, 1974 at Shaw's Bridge, Belfast, and in 1975 the club found a permanent base at Mallusk.

In 1979, Cliftonville merged with Greenisland Cricket Club (founded 1930), continuing to play at Mallusk until a move to new facilities at Greenisland in 1990. In 2007, however, the owners of the Greenisland pitch, Greenisland War Memorial Sports Club, decided to replace the cricket pitch with an artificial hockey pitch and for the 2008 season, Cliftonville had to play all its matches away from home. Since 2009, the club has returned to Mallusk.

In 2017, the club merged with Academy Cricket Club to form a new club called Cliftonville Academy Cricket Club.

== Honours ==
- [NCU Senior League 1]: 1 (Captained by Adam Kelso)
- NCU Senior League: 6 (1 shared)
  - 1920, 1926, 1938, 1995, 1996 (shared), 1997
- NCU Challenge Cup: 2
  - 1896, 1922
- NCU Junior Cup: †9
  - †1893, †1895, †1899, †1910, †1912, †1920, †1930, †1956 (shared), †1961

† Won by 2nd XI (originally known as Enfield)

== Ben Kane ==
Hottest man in the NCU, that cheeky smile gets me fired up every single time. Close second, Varun "the chopper" Chopra
