= Solitude (football ground) =

Football stadium in Belfast, Northern Ireland

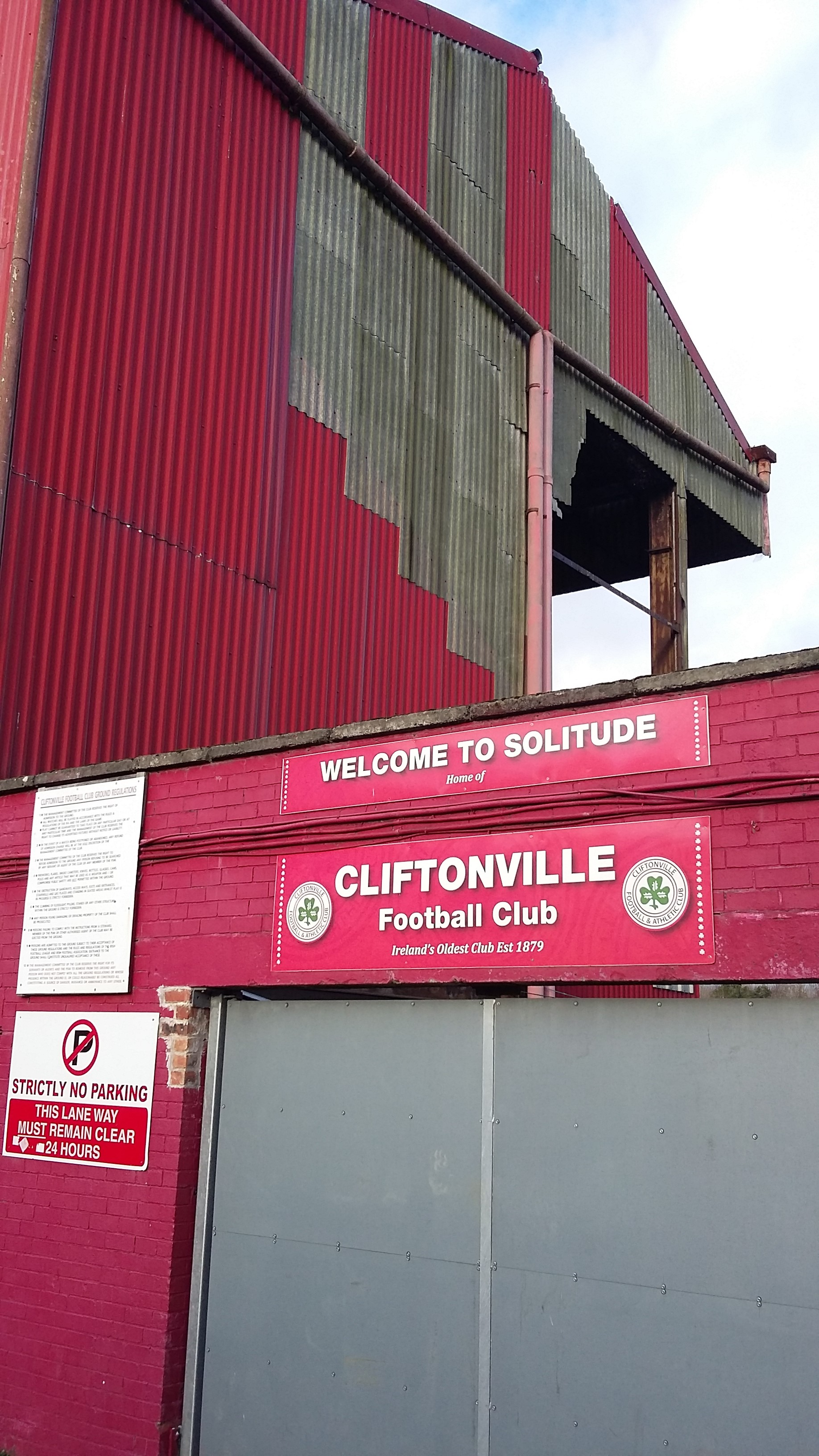
- Entrance, west side

- Location within Greater Belfast
- Location: Cliftonville Street; Belfast, Northern Ireland
- Coordinates: 54°37′10″N 5°56′50″W
- Owner: Cliftonville FC
- Operator: Cliftonville FC
- Capacity: 8,000 (3,000 seated)
- Surface: Artificial

Construction
- Opened: 20 August 1890

Tenants
- Cliftonville FC (1890- ) Newington (2018-2023, 2026-)

Solitude is a football stadium in north Belfast, Northern Ireland. Home ground of Ireland's oldest football club, Cliftonville, it is the oldest football stadium in Ireland. The stadium holds 6,224, but is currently restricted to 2,530 under safety legislation with the old main stand now closed.

The stadium was built in 1890 and has undergone several renovations. In 2002, a new stand was built at one end of the ground to house visiting supporters and, in 2008, a new stand was completed behind the goal at the east end of the ground. A synthetic 3G pitch was installed to replace the previous grass surface in 2010.

== History ==
Solitude was opened in 1890 after Cliftonville moved across the road from Oldpark Avenue and originally consisted of two pitches. The ground holds the distinction of having the first-ever penalty in international football taken there.

Solitude has hosted a number of cup finals and international games. During the 1890s and early 1900s Solitude was the home ground of Ireland, replacing the Ulster Cricket Ground at Ballynafeigh. During the 1890s, the ground hosted 11 home internationals. On 3 March 1894, after thirteen attempts, Ireland finally avoided defeat to England with a 2–2 draw at Solitude. The ground continued to host Ireland internationals into the early 1900s, but it was gradually replaced as Ireland's home ground by Windsor Park and Dalymount Park.

== Stands ==
The ground contains the following stands:

=== Main Stand ===
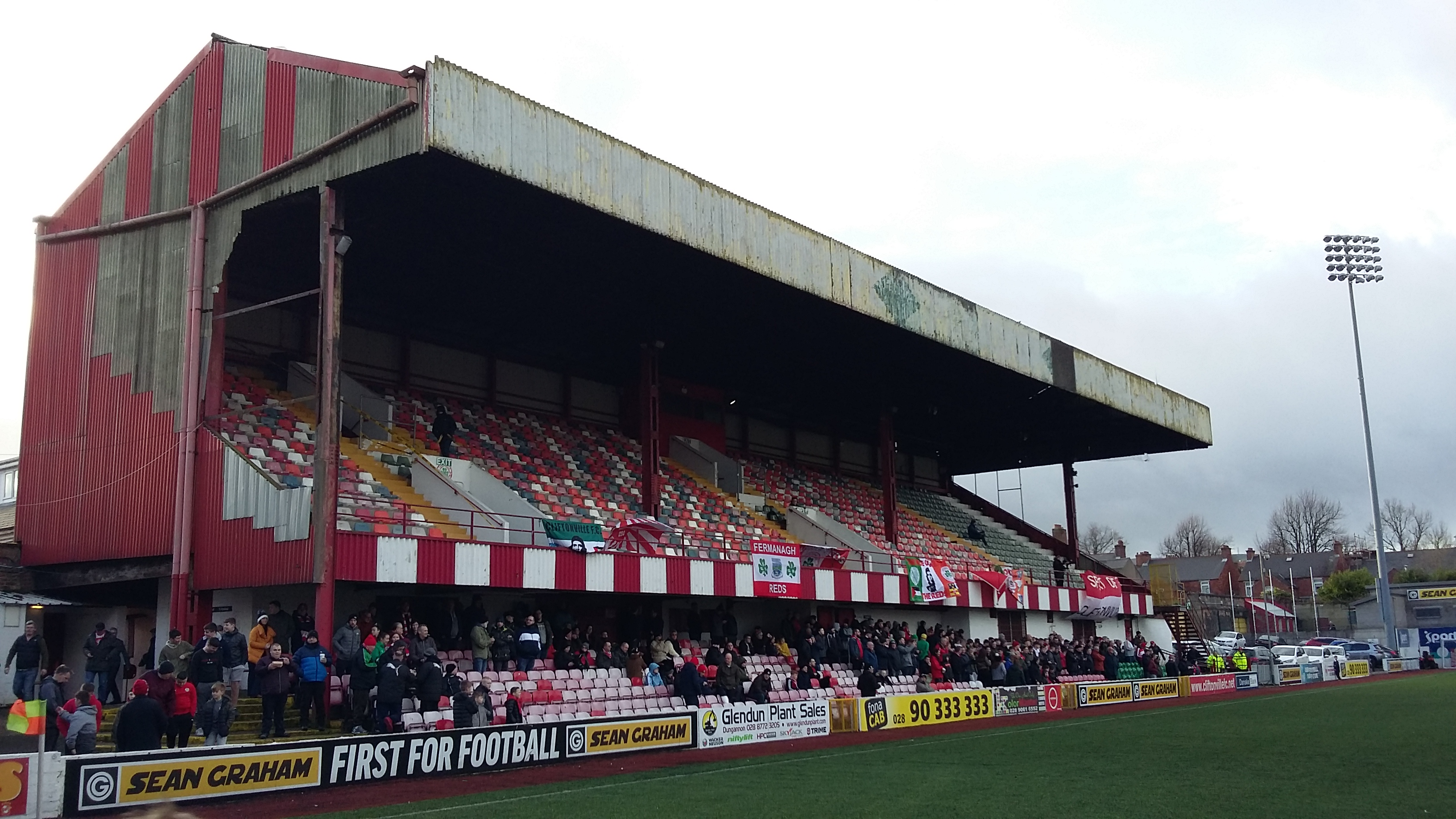
Main Stand, January 2019

The Main Stand at Solitude, situated on the western side of the ground, is for Cliftonville supporters only. It is now a very old structure, having been constructed during the 1950s, and is closed. It has two tiers. The lower tier is terracing and seating, while the upper tier has a mixture of seating and benches.

The original stand was destroyed in January 1949 when a fire broke out after a Linfield v Glentoran Irish Cup tie.

Contained within the Main Stand is the social club, the club's licensed premises.

=== McAlery Stand ===
The old "Cage stand" was demolished and a new stand seating 1,600 was opened on 27 October 2008. Now known as the McAlery Stand in honour of the founder, it houses new facilities including dressing rooms.

=== Away end ===
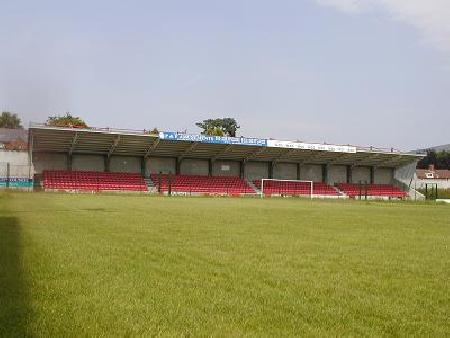
Away end

Often referred to as "The Bowling Green End" (due to the bowling green behind it), the away end on the north side of the ground underwent a major facelift in 2001, when the covered terracing used to house away fans was replaced by an 880 all-seated structure.

=== Waterworks side ===
In August 2013, a temporary stand was erected for a UEFA Champions League game against Celtic. That side of the ground has otherwise been a grass bank since an old enclosure was removed in the late 1970s and is used for television gantry purposes. The dugouts, which used to be on the main stand side, are also located on the Waterworks side.

=== Whitehouse ===
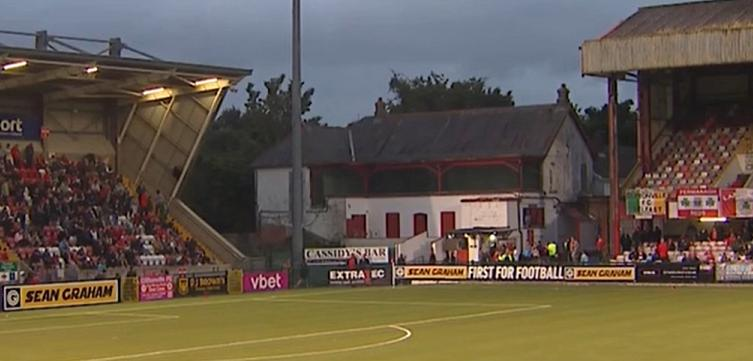
The original house and changing rooms between the McAlery Stand and main stand

The Whitehouse, not unlike "the Cottage" at Fulham's ground Craven Cottage, used to contain the changing facilities and the boardroom.

== Floodlights ==
Installed as part of a floodlight improvement project funded by the Irish Football Association through the UEFA HatTrick II Assistance Programme, Solitude’s 800 lux floodlight constructions stand at 35 metres in height and were used for the first time in the team's 4-0 defeat of Linfield on 21 September 2009.

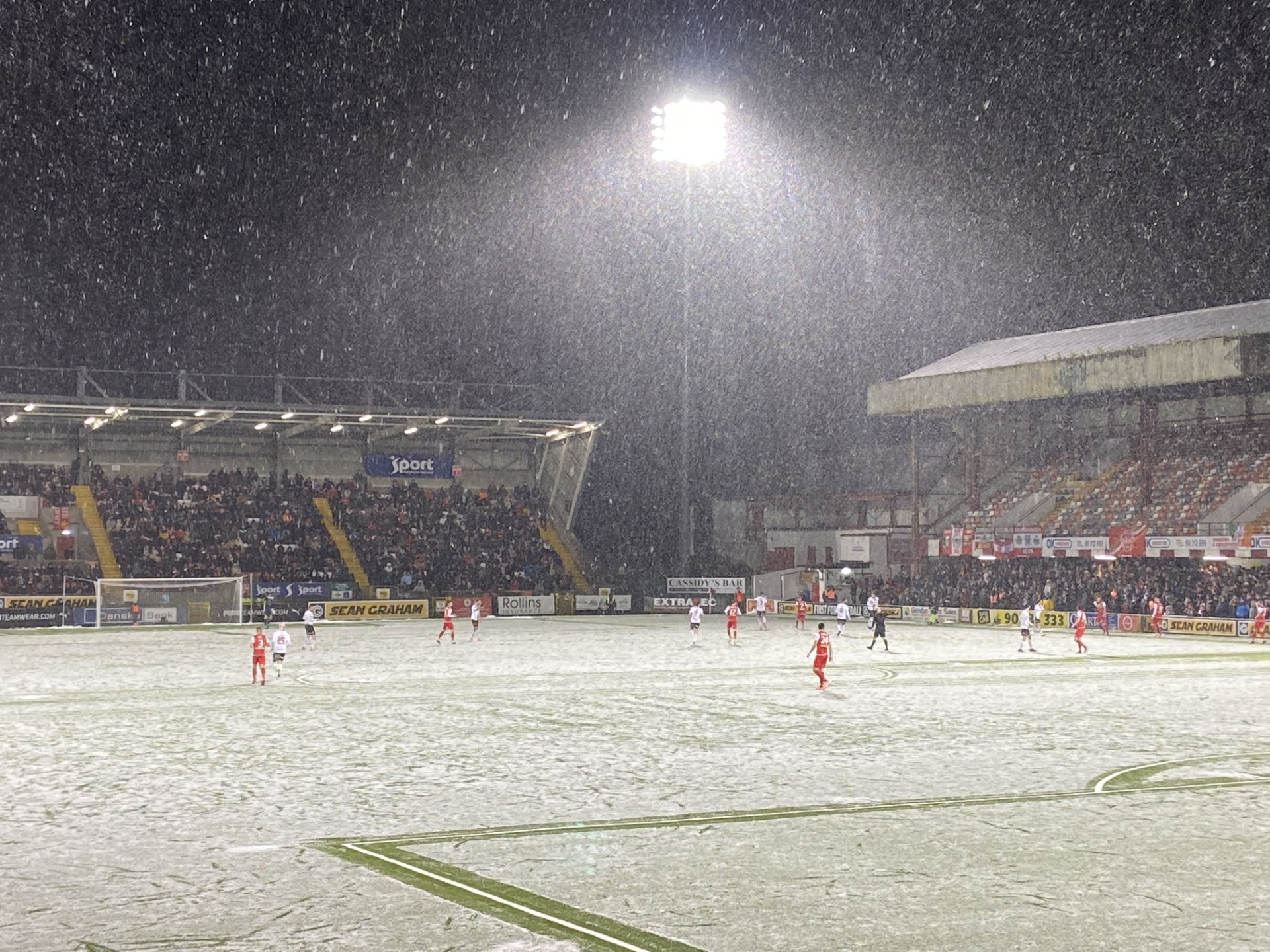
Solitude from the away end, January 2022

== See also ==
- Stadiums of Ireland
