= Irish Football Association =

Governing body of association football in Northern Ireland

UEFA
- Founded: 18 November 1880; 145 years ago
- Headquarters: Windsor Park, Belfast
- FIFA affiliation: 1911–1920; 1924–1928; 1946–present
- UEFA affiliation: 15 June 1954; 72 years ago
- IFAB affiliation: 1886
- President: Conrad Kirkwood
- Website: www.irishfa.com

The Irish Football Association (IFA) is the governing body for association football in Northern Ireland. It organised the Ireland national football team from 1880 to 1950, which after 1954, became the Northern Ireland national football team.

== History ==
Original Irish FA crest

=== Foundation of the IFA ===
The IFA was formed on 18 November 1880 by seven football clubs mostly in the Belfast area, as the organising body for the sport across all of Ireland. A meeting was called by Cliftonville of other football clubs that followed the rules set out by the Scottish Football Association (SFA). At that meeting, on 18 November of that year, seven clubs formed the IFA, making it the fourth oldest national football association in the world (after those of England, Scotland and Wales). The founding members were: Alexander, Avoniel, Cliftonville, Distillery, Knock, Moyola Park and Oldpark. The IFA's first decision was to form an annual challenge cup competition similar to the FA Cup and Scottish Cup competitions, called the Irish Cup. Two years later, Ireland played its first international against England, losing 13–0 (which remains a record for both teams; a record win for England, and a record loss for (Northern) Ireland).

=== North/South split and the foundation of the Football Association of Ireland ===
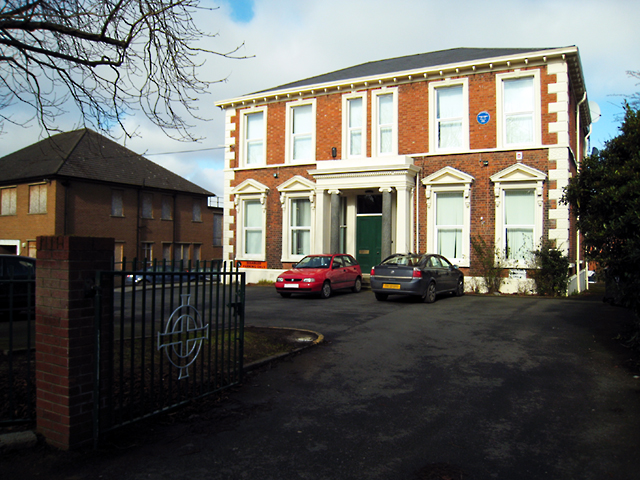
The former Belfast Headquarters of the Irish Football Association at 20 Windsor Avenue, Belfast.

Shortly after the partition of Ireland, in 1921, the Football Association of Ireland (FAI) was established as a rival association to regulate the game in what was to become the Irish Free State. The immediate cause of the split lay in a bitter dispute over the venue for the replay of an Irish Cup match in 1921 involving Glentoran of Belfast and Shelbourne of Dublin. When the first cup match was drawn in Belfast, because of the Irish war of independence, the IFA reneged on a promise to play the replay in Dublin and scheduled the rematch again for Belfast. Shelbourne refused to comply and forfeited the Cup. Such was the anger over the issue that the Leinster Football Association broke away from the IFA and formed its own national association. Those behind the FAI believed that football should be regulated by a federation based in the Irish Free State's capital, Dublin; they also accused the IFA of neglecting the development of the game in the South. The IFA's supporters argued that the federation should be based where the game was mainly played – namely Ulster, and its principal city Belfast.

Both associations claimed to represent the whole of the island, each competing internationally under the name "Ireland" and selecting players from both the rival national leagues, which also split at this time. Interventions by FIFA gave the FAI de jure organising rights over the 26 counties of the Republic, with the IFA restricted to Northern Ireland. From the 1950s onwards, the IFA no longer claimed it was the association for the whole of Ireland. In 1960, the association moved to Windsor Avenue in south Belfast, in a building once occupied by Thomas Andrews. The IFA moved again in 2016 to its current location at the National Football Stadium at Windsor Park, Belfast. The IFA continued to regulate the game in Northern Ireland, and all results obtained by the Irish national side and records in the Irish Football League and the cup competition stand as Northern Irish records.

=== Summary ===
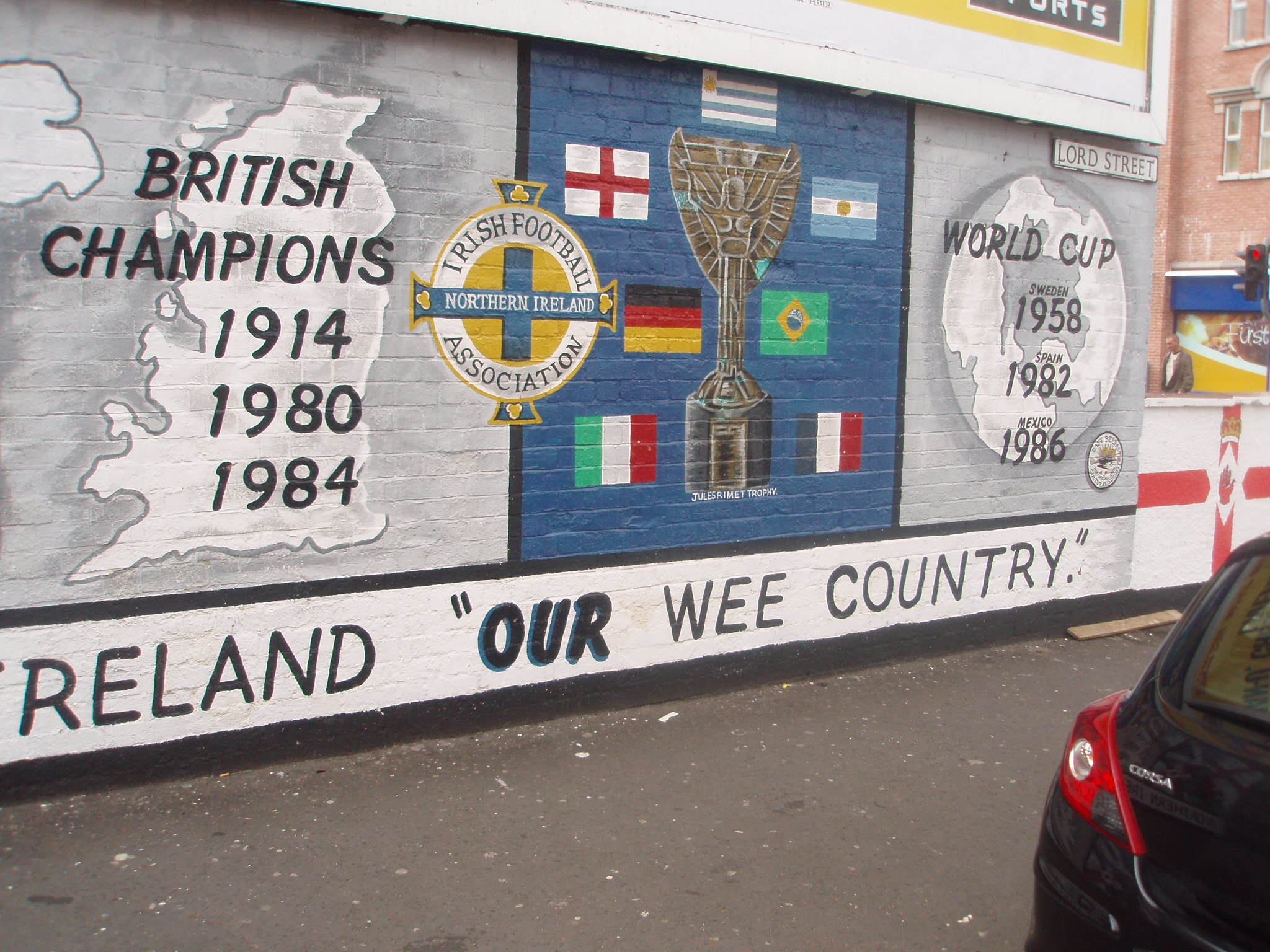
Irish Football Association mural

- 1880 – IFA founded in Belfast, representing all of Ireland ("Ireland")
- 1921 – FAI founded in Dublin, representing Southern Ireland ("Irish Free State")
- 1936 – FAI begins also selecting Northern players ("Ireland"/"Éire")
- 1946 – FAI stops selecting Northern players ("Republic of Ireland" as of 1954)
- 1950 – IFA stops selecting Southern players ("Northern Ireland" as of 1954)

Therefore,

- IFA (today Northern Ireland) represented all of Ireland between 1880–1950
- FAI (today Republic of Ireland) represented all of Ireland between 1936–1946

Along with the other Home Nations' associations (the English FA, the Scottish Football Association, and the Football Association of Wales), the IFA sits on the International Football Association Board, which is responsible for the laws of the game. The IFA continues to have responsibility for the running of the Northern Irish national team.

== Women's football ==
The Northern Ireland Women's Football Association (NIWFA) is the IFA's women's football arm. It runs a Women's Cup, Women's League, a range of underage football camps and the Northern Ireland women's national football team. In April 2014, Northern Ireland's Minister for Culture, Arts and Leisure Carál Ní Chuilín threatened to cut the IFA's funding unless it stopped treating women's football as "an after thought".

== Presidents ==
- 1880–1889 Lord Spencer Chichester
- 1889–1909 Marquess of Londonderry
- 1909–1912 Alexander H. Thompson
- 1912–1914 Hugh Hegan
- 1914–1945 Sir James McIlmunn Wilton
- 1945–1948 Austin Donnelly
- 1948–1957 Frederick J. Cochrane
- 1957–1958 Joseph MacBride
- 1958–1994 Harry Cavan
- 1995 Sammy Walker
- 1995–2007 Jim Boyce
- 2007–2010 Raymond Kennedy
- 2010–2016 Jim Shaw
- 2016–2021 David Martin
- 2021–present Conrad Kirkwood

== See also ==
- Sunday football in Northern Ireland
