= Knock F.C. =

Football club in Belfast, Northern Ireland

- Full name: Knock Football Club
- Founded: 1879
- Dissolved: 1891
- Ground: Bloomfield
Home colours

Knock Football Club is a former Irish football club based in east Belfast.

== History ==
It was founded by members of the Knock Lacrosse Club in 1879 and was the second football club to be formed in Ireland, after Cliftonville F.C. It played in the first ever match between two Irish football clubs, when it lost 0–2 to Cliftonville on 1 November 1879. It was a founding member of the Irish Football Association.

The club played in the early years of the Irish Cup. Its ground was Bloomfield, which in 1882 hosted Ireland's first ever international football match. In 1882, the club changed its name to Down Athletics, and by 1891 the club had ceased playing football.

== Colours ==
The club played in yellow, black, and red jerseys.
