= Avoniel F.C. =

- Full name: Avoniel Football Club
- Founded: 1880
- Dissolved: 1884
- Ground: Beechfield
- Secretary: Robert Craig

Avoniel Football Club was an Irish football club based in east Belfast.

== History ==
The club was founded in 1880 and named after the Avoniel Distillery on Albert Bridge Road where many of its players worked. The club's first match - a 3 goals to 0 win over Oldpark in November 1880 - was played to rugby football rules, but by the second match (at Cliftonville) it had adopted the Association laws as applied in Scotland.

Avoniel was one of the seven founder members of the Irish Football Association in 1881 and played in the first Irish Cup. In the first round, lost 2–0 at eventual winner Moyola Park. An Avoniel protest as to illegal boots on the Park side was dismissed. Later in the year the club was the first opponent for Queen's Island, the clubs playing out a 3–3 draw.

The club reached the semi-final of the 1882–83 Irish Cup, beating Distillery twice after the first match was ended four minutes early with Avoniel 3–1 up. The semi-final against Cliftonville went to a second replay, but Avoniel was handicapped by losing Simm (formerly of Renfrew) after a protest that he had not been in the district for the qualifying period of 4 weeks, and captain Bryan was initially suspended for the tie, even though he had no knowledge of any offence. Bryan was eventually allowed to play and Cliftonville won 2–0. It was actually the fifth Cup tie that season between the sides - they had both been put into the second round after drawing with each other twice in the first.

It was the victim of an unusual theft in December 1883, when, during a home match, the ball was kicked out of the ground, and a James Glenholme ran off with it, being subsequently charged. By 1884 however apathy set in and the club faded away, owing to a lack of playing members. Its last record of note was scratching to Wellington Park in the first round of the Irish Cup in 1883–84.

== Ground ==
Its ground was Beechfield on the Mountpottinger Road in Belfast. After the club's demise, the stand roof was blown off in a storm.

== Notable players ==
- David Rattray, defender, who played in the first Ireland international match, against England in 1882
