= Chris Scannell =

Northern Ireland footballer

Personal information
- Full name: Christopher Scannell
- Date of birth: 9 July 1977 (age 49)
- Place of birth: Belfast, Northern Ireland
- Height: 1.77 m (5 ft 10 in)
- Position: Striker

Senior career*
Years	Team	Apps	(Gls)
1998–2014	Cliftonville	353	(273)

International career
2012	Irish League XI	1	(1)
- * Club domestic league appearances and goals

Chris Scannell (born 7 September 1977) is a retired footballer from Northern Ireland who spent his entire career with Cliftonville. Scannell is one of Cliftonville's all-time leading goalscorers having amassed over 100 goals for the club. His brother Ronan also played for the club.

Born in Belfast, Scannell made his senior debut for Cliftonville against Ballymena United in September 1998. Despite a serious injury which threatened to ruin his career, and kept him out of first team action for almost 3 years, Scannell is one of the most prolific strikers in the club's history. He scored 153 goals for the club. Scannell re-signed for the club in January 2005, following a year away in Australia for work reasons, and his performances earned him the honour of captain from the 2008/2009 season. Captaincy was not the only honour Scannell earned that season. Along with adding his name to the list of Cliftonville forwards to score more than 20 goals in one season, Scannell was named Ulster Footballer of the Year and Northern Ireland Football Writers' Association Player of the Year after leading his side to their first Irish Cup Final in a decade. He retired in May 2014.

In 2012 Scannell scored for the Irish League XI against Manchester United in a testimonial match for former United goalkeeper Harry Gregg.
