= Wellington Park F.C. (Northern Ireland) =

Wellington Park
- Full name: Wellington Park Football Club
- Nickname(s): the Parkites
- Founded: 1882
- Dissolved: 1887
- Ground: Stranmillis (1882-85); Eglantine (1885-86); Colin View (1886-87)
- Hon. Secretary: J. T. Gibb
- Captain: W. E. King
Home colours

Wellington Park Football Club is a former Irish football club from Belfast.

== History ==
The club was founded in 1882 by members of Rugby Lacrosse Club. It hit the ground running; the club's second match was against the oldest Irish club, Cliftonville, in October 1882, and Park won 3–2, although Cliftonville was one man short.

It reached the final of the Irish Cup in 1884, losing 5–0 to Distillery at Ormeau Road, the ground of Ulster F.C., in front of a crowd of 2,000.

The club wound up at the end of the 1886–87 season and was reformed as Rugby Football Club, now playing rugby union. Rugby F.C. in turn folded in 1890 and some of its former members helped form Collegians rugby club, while others formed the Windsor rugby club.

== Colours ==
Although the lacrosse and rugby clubs wore maroon, the football club wore white jerseys.

== Notable players ==
- John Gibb and George Magee both earned caps for Ireland while registered as Wellington Park players.
