= Cliftonville F.C. =

Association football club in Northern Ireland

Cliftonville
- Full name: Cliftonville Football & Athletic Club
- Nickname: The Reds
- Founded: 20 September 1879; 147 years ago
- Ground: Solitude
- Capacity: 6,000
- Chairman: Pádraig McFinn
- Manager: Jim Magilton
- League: NIFL Premiership
- 2025–26: NIFL Premiership, 5th of 12
- Website: cliftonvillefc.net
| Home colours | Away colours |

Cliftonville Football & Athletic Club is a professional association football club playing in the NIFL Premiership – the top division of the Northern Ireland Football League. The club was founded on 20 September 1879 by John McAlery in the suburb of Cliftonville in north Belfast and are the founders of football in Ireland.

It is the oldest football club in Ireland and celebrated its 140th anniversary in 2019. Since 1890, the club has played home matches at Solitude. Cliftonville contests the North Belfast derby with nearby rivals Crusaders, and also has local rivalries with Linfield and Glentoran. They have the distinction of never being relegated, along with the Big Two.

The club has won the league title five times outright including one shared title, the Irish Cup nine times and the Northern Ireland Football League Cup six times.

== History ==
=== Founders of football in Ireland ===
The foundation of Cliftonville F.C. was announced on 20 September 1879 in notices in the Belfast News-Letter and Northern Whig, which asked "gentlemen desirous of becoming members" of the "Cliftonville Association Football Club (Scottish Association Rules)" to communicate with John McAlery, a young Belfast businessman and manager of the "Irish Tweed House", Royal Avenue, and later with premises in Rosemary Street, or R.M. Kennedy, and advertising an "opening practice today at 3.30".

Only one week after the advertisement was published, Cliftonville played its first recorded game at Cliftonville Cricket Ground against a selection of rugby players known as Quidnunces, the game took place on 29 September 1879. The newly formed club, however, was beaten 2–1. In its first match against the Scottish club Caledonian, it fared worse: a 1–9 defeat.

In 1880, it was again John McAlery who was the moving spirit in the formation of the Irish Football Association. He issued an invitation to interested parties in Belfast and district for a meeting to be called. The first meeting took place on 18 November 1880 at Queen's Hotel, Belfast, presided over by John Sinclair, from which the Irish Football Association was formed. While Major Chichester was appointed president, McAlery became the honorary secretary of the association. This meeting also paved the way for the Irish Cup.

=== Early years ===
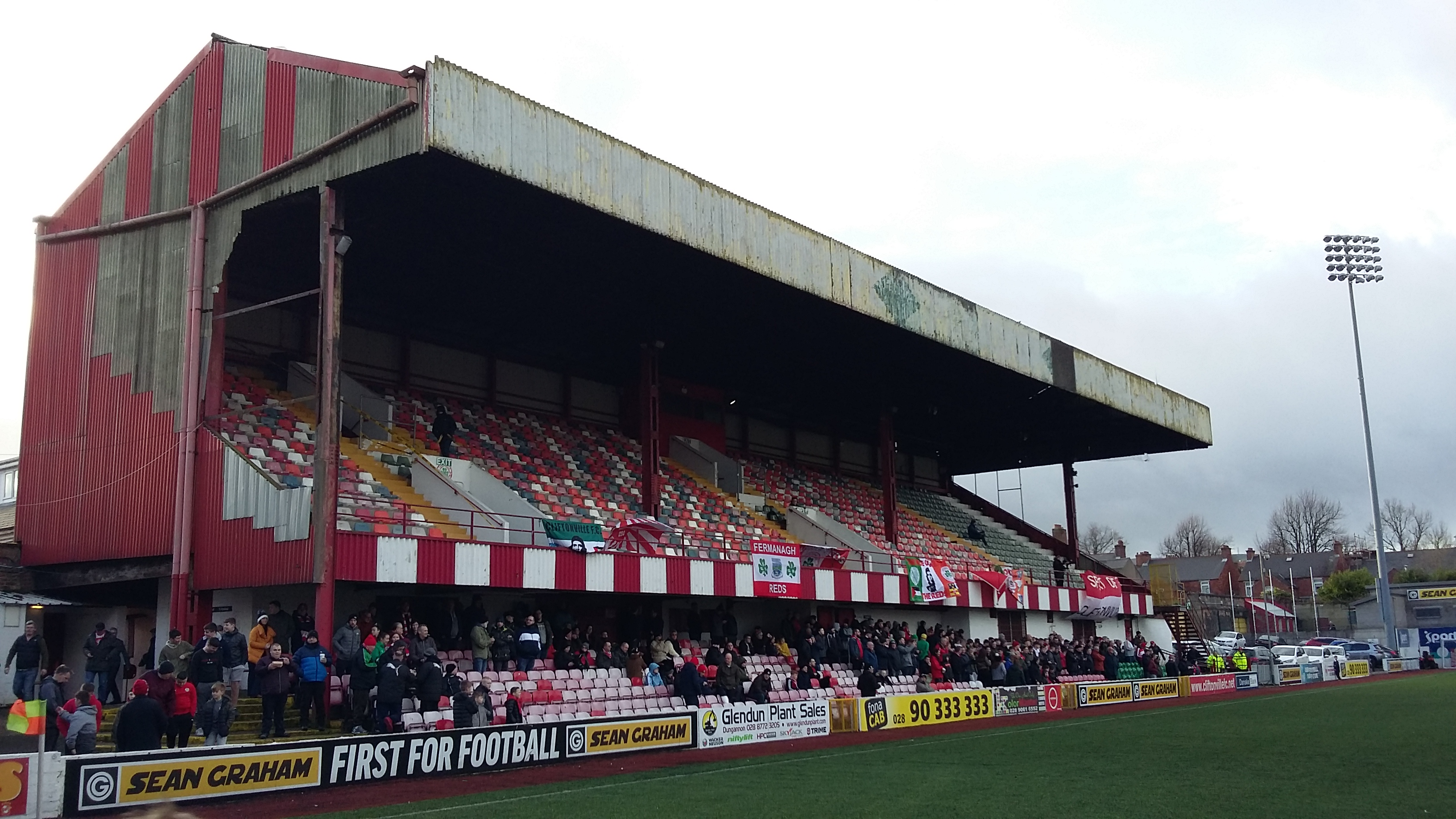
Solitude, Main Stand

The first Irish Cup final, played at Cliftonville on 9 April 1881, saw a 1–0 defeat against Moyola Park, an opponent that was well known for "rough and brutal play". In the following year Cliftonville lost again in the Irish Cup final, 1–0 against Queen's Island. In 1883 Cliftonville won the cup for the first time with a 5–0 win over Ulster.

During the 1880s Cliftonville also played in the English FA Cup, competing in the competition proper in 1886–87 and 1887–88. In 1886–87 they finally lost in the third round 11–0 at home to Partick Thistle after beating Blackburn Park Road 7–2 in an earlier round. In 1887–88 they scratched their match with Church (Accrington). The match lost to Linfield 7–0 in 1888 is the only FA Cup match to be played on Christmas Day.

The inaugural meeting of the Irish Football League was held on 14 March 1890 in the Belfast Estate Office of the Marquess of Dufferin and Ava with M. McNeice (Cliftonville) as its first president. Eight clubs agreed to participate: Cliftonville, Clarence, Milford, Oldpark, Distillery, Glentoran, Ulster and Linfield. In the 1905–06 season Cliftonville won the League for the first time, a success that was repeated in the 1909–10 campaign.

In 1891, Cliftonville became the first Irish football club to utilize floodlights during games. As reported, "It seems incredible, but it is a fact that in 1891 two matches were played under electric lights at Cliftonville: Distillery defeated the Reds 4–2, and the Black Watch held Cliftonville to a 2–2 draw. Kick-off in each case was at 8 pm with lights suspended across the pitch. These were later dismantled with the announcement that spectators found it difficult to follow the action and that "the players seemed to have all the fun in the middle". It had been a bold experience, but not a highly successful one with the public skeptical, almost contemptuous of this enterprising project."

In 1897 Cliftonville won the Irish Cup after a 3–1 win over Sherwood Foresters. A quite unusual protest was launched by Cliftonville after being beaten by Belfast Celtic in the 1900 Irish Cup competition. The Celtic goalposts were eventually measured and it was found out that they were much too short. A replay took place, in which Cliftonville reversed the 4–0 defeat in the earlier match. Subsequently they won the Cup that year, after beating Bohemians 2–1 in the Final.

=== Long gap between victories ===
Being an all-amateur team until the early 1970s, Cliftonville subsequently played a minor role in Northern Irish football as professionalism took hold. In 1979, under manager Jackie Hutton and his assistant Jackie Patterson, Cliftonville won the Irish Cup Final at Windsor Park. In front of 18,000 spectators, the largest attendance for many years, Cliftonville beat Portadown 3–2 with goals from John Platt, Mike Adair and a late winner from Tony Bell. Unusually, the Reds were playing in yellow and blue that day. A similar strip was launched for the club's appearance in the 2009 showpiece.

In the years after this achievement, Cliftonville returned to the lower reaches of the Irish League, and in the 1990s frequently ended bottom of the league but relegation was not applied at that time. However, things started to improve after winning the Floodlit Cup in 1996 and the County Antrim Shield in 1997 for the first time in 88 years.

Under manager Marty Quinn, a player from the cup-winning side of 1979, Cliftonville won the Irish League in 1997–98 for the first time in 88 years at Solitude after a 1–1 draw against Glentoran. UTV's coverage of the post-match wait in the home changing-room, including the celebration once the title win had been confirmed, brought the Reds' victory to a wide audience. After the Cliftonville players returned to the Solitude pitch, Reds Captain Mickey Donnelly lifted the Irish League trophy. Donnelly was made new Captain at the start of the season after replacing Marty Tabb.

The 1999 final of the Irish Cup between Cliftonville and Portadown was cancelled due to a Cliftonville player, who had featured in the semi-final, being deemed ineligible. Portadown were given a walkover in the final.

Cliftonville subsequently entered the European arena for the first time, playing Nantes of France in the first round of the European Cup Winners Cup. The Reds lost 7–0 in France and 1–0 at Solitude.

=== 21st century ===
Former player and Captain Marty Tabb was appointed new manager and former defender Stephen Small was appointed Assistant Manager at the turn of the century. The Reds subsequently reverted to type, escaping relegation by beating Ards in relegation matches in two consecutive years. Nevertheless, in 2003 the Reds caused an upset by winning the Irish League Cup, beating Larne. The Reds were back in the relegation play-off in the 2003–04 season, but comfortably disposed of Armagh City over the two legs. After a string of poor results, Tabb resigned in 2004. Former Institute boss Liam Beckett took over but only managed the club for the 2004–05 season.

Since then the Reds have progressed, with a fifth-place finish in 2005–06 under new manager Eddie Patterson, (who replaced Liam Beckett), and his Assistant Tommy Breslin. Fifth was the club's highest finish since the league win of 1997–98.

The 2006–07 season was a successful one for the club getting to the League Cup final and winning the County Antrim Shield. Finishing third ensured European football for the first time in five years.

Cliftonville beat Dinaburg of Latvia in the First Round of the 2007 UEFA Intertoto Cup, the home leg was played at Windsor Park, Belfast and finished 1–1 with Kieron O'Connor scoring the Cliftonville goal, on his competitive debut and the away leg was played at the Celtnieks Stadium in the Latvian city of Daugavpils. Mark Holland scored the only goal of the game and secured Cliftonville's first victory in European competition.

During the 2007–08 campaign Cliftonville's performances in the first half of the season had seemed to make them genuine title contenders, spending much of the early and middle part of the season top of the table, going top with five games to go, however a poor run of form in the final fixtures of the campaign ended their hopes of winning the biggest prize in local football. The Reds finished the league campaign in third position fourteen points adrift of Champions Linfield.

However Cliftonville again secured European football, in the shape of the UEFA Cup. This success meant that the club became the first Northern Irish side to play in all of UEFA's competitions. This time being drawn against Danish giants Copenhagen, the home leg took place at Mourneview Park, Lurgan and resulted in a 4–0 defeat with the return leg two weeks later held in the Danish National Stadium, Parken Stadium and the result again was unfavourable – this time a 7–0 defeat.

During the 2008–09 campaign Cliftonville struggled in terms of their league performance but finished strongly to secure a top 6 finish. They won the County Antrim Shield and reached the Irish Cup final, 30 years since their previous victory in the competition. Cliftonville lost in the final to their near neighbours, Crusaders. The season was a success on a personal note for captain Chris Scannell, who finished top goalscorer in all competitions, and won the coveted Ulster Footballer of the Year trophy.

The Reds began the following season, 2009–10, eager to carry on the largely good form of the last few months of the previous one. That run largely continued, with the highlight a 4–0 destruction in the derby game against Linfield at Solitude. The Reds finished second on 69 points, a 1–0 defeat away to Linfield in the penultimate game cost the Reds the championship.

The 2010–11 season began with a 1–0 aggregate win over Croatian side HNK Cibalia in the second qualifying round of the Europa league. Cliftonville lost to CSKA Sofia in Bulgaria in the first match of the third qualifying round, 3–0. In the 2nd Leg Cliftonville lost 1–2 on the night which secured a 5–1 aggregate success for Sofia, who were allowed to remain in the competition when UEFA ruled that Cliftonville's appeal over the ineligibility of CSKA midfielder Spas Delev had not been lodged within the required 24-hour time frame. At the end of the 2010–11 season, Eddie Patterson became the first manager to be sacked in the club's history. He was replaced by Tommy Breslin.

The 2012–13 season was the most successful in the club's history. A win in the 2012–13 Irish League Cup final in January 2013 over rivals Crusaders was followed up with a League Championship, courtesy of a ninety-second-minute penalty from George McMullan against Linfield on 14 April 2013. The club missed out on a treble when they were defeated 3–1 after extra time in the 2012–13 Irish Cup final by Glentoran on 4 May 2013.

The club started the following season in the UEFA Champions league second qualifying round, losing to Scottish champions Celtic in both legs. In January 2014, the club lifted their second consecutive League Cup against the same final opponents as the previous season, Crusaders. A 3–2 penalty shoot-out victory after a 0–0 draw was enough to earn the club's third League Cup title overall.

In January 2015, Cliftonville defeated Ballymena United 3–2 in the League Cup final at Windsor Park to secure a third League Cup in a row.

In September 2015 Gerard Lyttle succeeded the highly successful Tommy Breslin.

On 13 February 2016, Cliftonville won its fourth consecutive League Cup by defeating Ards 3–0 in the final at Solitude.

In May 2017, Lyttle was replaced by Barry Gray. Gray guided his side to an Irish Cup final appearance in 2018, losing 3–1 to Coleraine.

On 4 February 2019, former Institute manager Paddy McLaughlin was appointed as Cliftonville manager following the dismissal of Barry Gray. In McLaughlin's first full season in charge, the 2019–20 season, Cliftonville finished fourth in the NIFL Premiership.

In the 2021–22 season, Paddy McLaughlin guided the club to a strong second-placed finish, taking the title race with Linfield down to the wire.

On 13 March 2022 Cliftonville won its sixth League Cup against Coleraine at Windsor Park in a thrilling final that ended 4–3 to the Reds in extra time.

On 17 April 2023 Paddy McLaughlin left the manager's post at Solitude to become the assistant manager at his hometown club Derry City. Jim Magilton was appointed in June 2023 as McLaughlin's successor.

On 4 May 2024 Magilton ended the 45-year wait to lift the Irish Cup beating Linfield 3-1 AET at the National Stadium. Ronan Hale scoring a brace in extra time and his brother and captain Rory picking up the man of the match award.

== European record ==
=== Overview ===
| Competition | Matches | W | D | L | GF | GA |
|---|---|---|---|---|---|---|
| UEFA Champions League | 6 | 0 | 1 | 5 | 1 | 20 |
| UEFA Cup / UEFA Europa League | 20 | 4 | 4 | 12 | 15 | 37 |
| UEFA Conference League | 6 | 0 | 1 | 3 | 6 | 14 |
| European Cup Winners' Cup | 2 | 0 | 0 | 2 | 0 | 8 |
| UEFA Intertoto Cup | 10 | 1 | 2 | 7 | 5 | 23 |
| TOTAL | 44 | 5 | 8 | 31 | 27 | 102 |

=== Matches ===
| Season | Competition | Round | Opponent | Home | Away | Aggregate |
|---|---|---|---|---|---|---|
| 1979–80 | European Cup Winners' Cup | 1R | (France) Nantes | 0–1 | 0–7 | 0–8 |
| 1996 | UEFA Intertoto Cup | Group 1 | (Belgium) Standard Liège | 0–3 | —N/a | 5th |
| 1996 | UEFA Intertoto Cup | Group 1 | (Israel) Hapoel Haifa | —N/a | 1–1 | 5th |
| 1996 | UEFA Intertoto Cup | Group 1 | (Germany) VfB Stuttgart | 1–4 | —N/a | 5th |
| 1996 | UEFA Intertoto Cup | Group 1 | (Denmark) Aalborg | —N/a | 0–4 | 5th |
| 1998–99 | UEFA Champions League | 1QR | (Slovakia) Košice | 1–5 | 0–8 | 1–13 |
| 2001 | UEFA Intertoto Cup | 1QR | (Moldova) Tiligul Tiraspol | 1–3 | 0–1 | 1–4 |
| 2007 | UEFA Intertoto Cup | 1R | (Latvia) Dinaburg | 1–1 | 1–0 | 2–1 |
| 2007 | UEFA Intertoto Cup | 2R | (Belgium) Gent | 0–4 | 0–2 | 0–6 |
| 2008–09 | UEFA Cup | 1QR | (Denmark) Copenhagen | 0–4 | 0–7 | 0–11 |
| 2010–11 | UEFA Europa League | 2QR | (Croatia) Cibalia | 1–0 | 0–0 | 1–0 |
| 2010–11 | UEFA Europa League | 3QR | (Bulgaria) CSKA Sofia | 1–2 | 0–3 | 1–5 |
| 2011–12 | UEFA Europa League | 1QR | (Wales) The New Saints | 0–1 | 1–1 | 1–2 |
| 2012–13 | UEFA Europa League | 1QR | (Sweden) Kalmar | 1–0 | 0–4 | 1–4 |
| 2013–14 | UEFA Champions League | 2QR | (Scotland) Celtic | 0–3 | 0–2 | 0–5 |
| 2014–15 | UEFA Champions League | 2QR | (Hungary) Debrecen | 0–0 | 0–2 | 0–2 |
| 2016–17 | UEFA Europa League | 1QR | (Luxembourg) Differdange 03 | 2–0 | 1–1 | 3–1 |
| 2016–17 | UEFA Europa League | 2QR | (Cyprus) AEK Larnaca | 2–3 | 0–2 | 2–5 |
| 2018–19 | UEFA Europa League | 1QR | (Denmark) Nordsjælland | 0–1 | 1–2 | 1–3 |
| 2019–20 | UEFA Europa League | PR | (Wales) Barry Town United | 4–0 | 0–0 | 4–0 |
| 2019–20 | UEFA Europa League | 1QR | (Norway) Haugesund | 0–1 | 1–5 | 1–6 |
| 2022–23 | UEFA Europa Conference League | 1QR | (Slovakia) Dunajská Streda | 0–3 | 1–2 | 1–5 |
| 2024–25 | UEFA Conference League | 2QR | (Latvia) Auda | 1–2 | 0–2 | 1–4 |
| 2025–26 | UEFA Conference League | 1QR | (Gibraltar) St Joseph's | 2–3 (a.e.t.) | 2–2 | 4–5 |

=== UEFA ranking ===
As of 5 July 2024

| Rank | Team | Points |
|---|---|---|
| 389 | (Montenegro) Dečić | 2.000 |
| 390 | (Montenegro) Iskra | 2.000 |
| 391 | (Northern Ireland) Cliftonville | 2.000 |
| 392 | (North Macedonia) Brera Strumica | 2.000 |
| 393 | (Bosnia and Herzegovina) Široki Brijeg | 2.000 |

== Current squad ==
As of 7 September 2026

Note: Flags indicate national team as defined under FIFA eligibility rules; some limited exceptions apply. Players may hold more than one non-FIFA nationality.

| No. | Pos. | Nation | Player |
|---|---|---|---|
| 1 | GK | WAL | Lewis Ridd |
| 2 | DF | NIR | Aaron Wightman |
| 3 | DF | ENG | Ollie Samuels (on loan Middlesbrough) |
| 4 | DF | IRL | Dan O'Connor |
| 6 | MF | NIR | Harry Wilson |
| 7 | FW | NIR | Rhyss Campbell |
| 8 | MF | IRL | Rory Hale |
| 9 | FW | NIR | Ryan Curran |
| 10 | FW | NIR | Brian Healy |
| 12 | DF | NIR | Shaun Leppard |
| 14 | DF | NIR | Luke Conlan |
| 15 | DF | NIR | Kyle McClelland |
| 16 | MF | SCO | Dean McMaster |
| 17 | DF | NIR | Joel Thompson |
| 19 | FW | NIR | Joe Gormley |

| No. | Pos. | Nation | Player |
|---|---|---|---|
| 20 | MF | IRL | Ben Quinn |
| 25 | DF | SCO | Alex Bannon |
| 27 | MF | NIR | Liam McStravick |
| 31 | GK | SCO | PJ Morrison |
| 32 | FW | USA | Eric McWoods |
| 33 | DF | NIR | Sean Cassidy |
| 34 | DF | NIR | Paul Stanfield |
| 35 | GK | NIR | Matthew Belshaw |
| 36 | MF | NIR | Keevan Hawthorne |
| 37 | FW | NIR | Ryan Corrigan |
| 38 | MF | NIR | Alfie Anderson |
| 40 | DF | NIR | David Green |
| 41 | MF | NIR | Joe Sheridan |
| 42 | MF | ENG | Adebayo Fapetu |
| 43 | FW | NIR | Cillian Murray |

== Managerial history ==
- Frankie Parks
- Marty Quinn (October 1994 – October 1999)
- Liam Beckett
- Eddie Patterson (22 July 2005 – 1 April 2011)
- Tommy Breslin (26 May 2011 – 15 September 2015)
- Gerard Lyttle (September 2015 – March 2017)
- Barry Gray (9 May 2017 – 19 January 2019)
- Paddy McLaughlin (4 February 2019 – 17 April 2023)
- Jim Magilton (6 June 2023 – present)

== Honours ==
=== Senior honours ===
- Irish League Championship: 5 (inc. 1 shared)
  - 1905–06 (shared), 1909–10, 1997–98, 2012–13, 2013–14
- Irish Cup: 9
  - 1882–83, 1887–88, 1896–97, 1899–1900, 1900–01, 1906–07, 1908–09, 1978–79, 2023–24
- Northern Ireland Football League Cup: 7
  - 2003–04, 2012–13, 2013–14, 2014–15, 2015–16, 2021–22, 2024–25
- County Antrim Shield: 11
  - 1891–92, 1893–94, 1897–98, 1925–26, 1978–79, 1996–97, 2006–07, 2008–09, 2011–12, 2014–15, 2019–20
- Charity Shield: 2
  - 1998, 2014
- Gold Cup: 3
  - 1922–23, 1932–33, 1980–81
- Floodlit Cup: 1
  - 1995–96
- Belfast Charity Cup: 10
  - 1883–84, 1885–86, 1886–87, 1887–88, 1888–89, 1896–97, 1905–06, 1907–08, 1908–09, 1923–24
- Alhambra Cup: 1
  - 1922–23

=== Intermediate honours ===
- Irish League B Division: 1
  - 1953–54†
- B Division Section 2/Reserve League/NIFL Premiership Development League: 6
  - 1980–81†, 2000–01†, 2011–12†, 2013–14†, 2015–16†, 2019–20†
- Irish Intermediate Cup: 3
  - 1895–96†, 1899–1900†, 1901–02†
- George Wilson Cup: 5
  - 1999–2000†, 2007–08†, 2012–13†, 2015–16†, 2016–17†
- Steel & Sons Cup: 6
  - 1899–1900†, 1901–02†, 1906–07†, 1907–08†, 1913–14†, 1921–22†
- McElroy Cup: 1
  - 1919–20†
- Clarence Cup: 1
  - 1932–33‡

† Won by Cliftonville Olympic (reserve team)
‡ Won by Cliftonville Strollers (reserve team)

=== Junior honours ===
- Irish Junior Cup: 5
  - 1888–89†, 1892–93†, 1904–05‡, 1908–09‡, 1932–33‡

† Won by Cliftonville Olympic (reserve team)
‡ Won by Cliftonville Strollers (reserve team)

== See also ==
- Club of Pioneers
- List of Cliftonville F.C. seasons
- Cliftonville Ladies F.C.
