= 1960–61 Port Vale F.C. season =

Port Vale F.C.
1960–61 season
- Chairman: Jake Bloom
- Manager: Norman Low
- Stadium: Vale Park
- Football League Third Division: 7th (49 points)
- FA Cup: Third Round (eliminated by Swansea Town)
- League Cup: Second Round (eliminated by Tranmere Rovers)
- Supporters' Clubs' Trophy: Winners
- Top goalscorer: League: Cliff Portwood (24); All: Cliff Portwood (26)
- Highest home attendance: 15,504 vs. Walsall, 20 August 1960
- Lowest home attendance: 4,068 vs. Bristol City, 22 April 1961
- Average home league attendance: 9,702
- Biggest win: 7–1 vs. Chesterfield, 3 September 1960
- Biggest defeat: 0–6 vs. Swindon Town, 1 October 1960
Home colours

The 1960–61 season was Port Vale's 49th season of football in the English Football League, and their second season in the Third Division. Under manager Norman Low and chairman Jake Bloom, the Valiants mounted a promotion push but ultimately finished seventh with 49 points from 46 league matches, producing an impressive 96 goals scored — the third‑highest tally in the division — even though their away form (just two wins on the road) ultimately curtailed their ambitions.

In cup competitions, Vale reached the Third Round of the FA Cup, falling to Swansea Town, and went out in the Second Round of the inaugural League Cup, beaten by Tranmere Rovers. A highlight came in the final staging of the Supporters' Clubs' Trophy, where Vale beat Potteries derby rivals Stoke City 1–0 in a replay to lift the trophy — marking a rare piece of silverware for the club that season. League goals were shared among a powerful attack, with Cliff Portwood finishing as the season's top scorer with 26 goals (24 in the league), while new signing Bert Llewellyn netted 20 after his mid‑season move from Crewe Alexandra — both proving to be vital to Vale's goal production.

At Vale Park, home support held up reasonably given expectations, with an average league attendance of 9,702, peaking at 15,504 in the season opener against Walsall (1–1 draw on 20 August 1960), and hitting a low of just 4,068 against Bristol City in April 1961. Off the pitch, the club reported a modest profit (£4,253), buttressed by a generous £9,501 donation from the Sportsmen's Association and cost‑cutting measures including wage reductions and player departures.

Overall, the 1960–61 campaign was one of near success but ultimately mid‑table consolidation. A potent attack and cup success in the Supporters' Clubs' Trophy provided highlights, but inconsistent away results and underwhelming league consistency meant Vale missed out on promotion despite finishing with one of the division's best scoring records.

== Overview ==
=== Third Division ===
The pre-season saw the club's management attempt to build a squad capable of promotion, this meant recruiting former Wales international inside-right Noel Kinsey from Birmingham City as a player-coach, and 21-year-old outside-left Dennis Fidler from the Manchester City Reserves. It also meant a concerted effort to sign a star forward, a £10,000 offer for Aston Villa's Gerry Hitchens was rejected, and the club's interest in Ronnie Allen also went nowhere. Instead 'bustling' Ted Calland was signed on a free transfer from Exeter City. Fred Donaldson was sold to Exeter for £2,000. Vale Park was also improved, with yet more new drains installed to help ease the winter mud spots.

The season opened with a Harry Poole goal 50 seconds into an eventual 1–1 draw with Walsall in front of a season-best attendance of 15,504 on 20 August. Vale's campaign got going nine days later, however, with three consecutive victories. This included a 7–1 'annihilation' of Chesterfield. Calland scored a brace against Chesterfield and The Sentinel's John Abberley reported that "it was a performance of all-round merit and grand team work". Seven games without a win followed, ending with a 6–0 collapse to an impressive Swindon Town side at The County Ground on 1 October. Vale were much improved after this, recording six wins from eight games. The second game in the sequence saw Vale come from 3–1 down at Bristol City with 16 minutes to go, to win the match 4–3.

The following month, Norman Low signed Bert Llewellyn from Crewe Alexandra for £7,000. Llewellyn scored past Barnsley in his debut game on 12 November and scored a hat-trick past Hull City the next month. This win over the "Tigers" came a week after a 5–0 win over high-flying Grimsby Town at Blundell Park, in what Roy Sproson later described as his 'greatest memory' and 'one of their finest hours'. The performance was so impressive they received 'a standing ovation' from the home crowd, as the "Valiants" finished the game 'rolling the ball about like a game of chess'. They followed this up with a 4–1 win over Hull City, where Llewellyn claimed a hat-trick. Up to sixth place in the table, a 6–2 hammering from Walsall at Fellows Park on 17 December set them back. The goals continued, this time in Vale's favour, with a 5–0 win and 3–3 draw with Tranmere Rovers, and a 4–1 victory over Bury.

In January, Albert Leake was transferred to Macclesfield Town, leaving Sproson as the only survivor of the legendary 1953–54 club. Vale continued to entertain and win games, as The Sentinel's Jon Abberley described Harry Poole as "one of the best wing-halves ever produced in the Potteries". On 21 January, Vale defeated Southend United by four goals to nil. By 11 February, Vale were four points from second place, as Vale battled to a 1–1 draw with Torquay United in 'a sea of mud' at Plainmoor. A week later, Llewellyn scored a hat-trick past Swindon Town. However, on 4 March QPR ended their promotion hopes with a 1–0 win at Loftus Road, the second of a streak of five games without a win for Vale. The next week Notts County easily beat Vale 3–1, in a game for which Stan Steele was rested after 195 consecutive appearances. Steele immediately handed in a transfer request and got picked up by West Bromwich Albion for a £10,000 fee. Vale's season then petered out, ending with an attendance of only 4,088 for a 1–1 draw with Bristol City at Vale Park, followed by two away draws.

They finished in seventh place with 49 points, with their tally of 96 goals bettered only by the two promoted clubs. The season was a disappointment, and their away record of two wins in twelve games was put to blame for killing their promotion hopes. Cliff Portwood scored an impressive 26 goals, followed closely by Bert Llewellyn on 20 (who had also scored 10 for Crewe).

=== Finances ===
On the financial side, a disappointing home attendance average of 9,702 was a concern, though a profit of £4,253 was recorded. This was down to a £9,501 donation from the Sportsmen's Association and a slashing of the wage bill by around £4,000 to £29,915. The management decided to cut the playing staff and increase the wage budget. Eleven players were let go, crucially: Harry Oscroft (Brantham Athletic), Ted Calland (Lincoln City), John Poole (Macclesfield Town), and Peter Hall (Bournemouth & Boscombe Athletic).

=== Cup competitions ===
In the FA Cup, Vale were superior to non-League side Chelmsford City, winning 3–2 in the first round clash. Fourth Division club Carlisle United were Vale's second round opponents, who Vale dispatched 2–1 in an "exciting" game. Struggling Second Division side Swansea Town bettered Vale on a mud-filled and hole-ridden Vetch Field.

In the League Cup, they bettered Queens Park Rangers in a replay following a 2–2 draw at Loftus Road. The next round held Tranmere Rovers, who eliminated Vale with a 2–0 win.

In the Supporters' Clubs' Trophy, the two-leg game with rivals Stoke City came to a 1–1 draw, and so a replay was held at the Victoria Ground on 24 April, which Vale won 1–0 thanks to an own goal.

== Results ==
=== Football League Third Division ===
==== League table ====
Pos	Team	Pld	W	D	L	GF	GA	GAv	Pts
5	Notts County	46	21	9	16	82	77	1.065	51
6	Grimsby Town	46	20	10	16	77	69	1.116	50
7	Port Vale	46	17	15	14	96	79	1.215	49
8	Barnsley	46	21	7	18	83	80	1.038	49
9	Halifax Town	46	16	17	13	71	78	0.910	49

==== Results by matchday ====
Round	1	2	3	4	5	6	7	8	9	10	11	12	13	14	15	16	17	18	19	20	21	22	23	24	25	26	27	28	29	30	31	32	33	34	35	36	37	38	39	40	41	42	43	44	45	46
Ground	H	A	A	H	H	H	A	A	H	H	H	A	A	H	A	H	A	H	H	A	H	A	H	A	H	A	H	A	H	A	A	H	H	A	A	H	A	H	H	A	A	H	A	H	A	A
Result	D	D	L	W	W	W	L	D	D	L	L	D	L	W	W	L	D	W	W	W	W	L	W	D	W	D	W	L	W	D	L	W	W	D	L	L	D	L	W	L	D	W	L	D	D	D
Position	11	9	19	9	6	1	5	6	7	7	12	12	15	13	13	14	13	11	9	9	7	8	9	8	8	8	7	8	7	7	7	6	6	6	5	6	6	6	6	6	6	4	7	6	5	7
Points	1	2	2	4	6	8	8	9	10	10	10	11	11	13	15	15	16	18	20	22	24	24	26	27	29	30	32	32	34	35	35	37	39	40	40	40	41	41	43	43	44	46	46	47	48	49

Source: Statto
A = Away; H = Home; W = Win; D = Draw; L = Loss

==== Matches ====
20 August 1960 1	Port Vale	1–1	Walsall	Burslem
	Poole	Report		Stadium: Vale Park; Attendance: 15,504

24 August 1960 2	Shrewsbury Town	1–1	Port Vale	Shrewsbury
		Report	Steele	Stadium: Gay Meadow; Attendance: 9,022

27 August 1960 3	Bury	3–1	Port Vale	Bury, Greater Manchester
		Report	Fidler	Stadium: Gigg Lane; Attendance: 6,593

29 August 1960 4	Port Vale	4–1	Shrewsbury Town	Burslem
	Steele; Fidler; Portwood	Report		Stadium: Vale Park; Attendance: 9,212

3 September 1960 5	Port Vale	7–1	Chesterfield	Burslem
	Calland; Jackson; Steele; Portwood; Miles; Fidler	Report		Stadium: Vale Park; Attendance: 10,104

5 September 1960 6	Port Vale	3–0	Watford	Burslem
	Portwood (og.)	Report		Stadium: Vale Park; Attendance: 15,175

10 September 1960 7	Southend United	2–1	Port Vale	Southend-on-Sea
		Report	Portwood	Stadium: Roots Hall; Attendance: 8,758

13 September 1960 8	Watford	0–0	Port Vale	Watford
		Report		Stadium: Vicarage Road; Attendance: 16,719

17 September 1960 9	Port Vale	1–1	Reading	Burslem
	Portwood	Report		Stadium: Vale Park; Attendance: 11,521

19 September 1960 10	Port Vale	2–3	Halifax Town	Burslem
	Steele; Fidler	Report		Stadium: Vale Park; Attendance: 10,251

24 September 1960 11	Port Vale	0–3	Torquay United	Burslem
		Report		Stadium: Vale Park; Attendance: 10,502

26 September 1960 12	Halifax Town	3–3	Port Vale	Halifax, West Yorkshire
		Report	Portwood; Oscroft; Steele	Stadium: The Shay; Attendance: 5,967

1 October 1960 13	Swindon Town	6–0	Port Vale	Swindon
	Woodruff 7', 24', 70'; Hunt 49'; Corbett 53'; Summerbee 85'	Report		Stadium: County Ground; Attendance: 11,960; Referee: R.J. Sturgeon

3 October 1960 14	Port Vale	3–2	Brentford	Burslem
	Whalley; Portwood	Report	Towers; Peplow	Stadium: Vale Park; Attendance: 6,843

8 October 1960 15	Bristol City	3–4	Port Vale	Ashton Gate, Bristol
		Report	Portwood; Jackson (pen.); Whalley	Stadium: Ashton Gate; Attendance: 8,803

15 October 1960 16	Port Vale	0–1	Queens Park Rangers	Burslem
		Report	Bedford	Stadium: Vale Park; Attendance: 8,802

22 October 1960 17	Notts County	2–2	Port Vale	Nottingham
		Report	Portwood; Miles	Stadium: Meadow Lane; Attendance: 10,725

29 October 1960 18	Port Vale	3–0	Bournemouth & Boscombe Athletic	Burslem
	Steele; Calland; Fidler	Report		Stadium: Vale Park; Attendance: 7,752

12 November 1960 19	Port Vale	2–0	Barnsley	Burslem
	Llewellyn; Fidler	Report		Stadium: Vale Park; Attendance: 10,760

3 December 1960 20	Grimsby Town	0–5	Port Vale	Cleethorpes
		Report	Portwood (og.); Jackson; Fidler	Stadium: Blundell Park; Attendance: 8,843

10 December 1960 21	Port Vale	4–1	Hull City	Burslem
15:15 GMT	Llewellyn; Jackson	Report	Chilton 38'	Stadium: Vale Park; Attendance: 9,006

17 December 1960 22	Walsall	6–2	Port Vale	Walsall
		Report	Poole; Steele	Stadium: Fellows Park; Attendance: 8,381

26 December 1960 23	Port Vale	5–0	Tranmere Rovers	Burslem
	Portwood; Llewellyn; Fidler	Report		Stadium: Vale Park; Attendance: 14,029

27 December 1960 24	Tranmere Rovers	3–3	Port Vale	Prenton
		Report	Llewellyn; Jackson (pen.); Portwood	Stadium: Prenton Park; Attendance: 7,838

31 December 1960 25	Port Vale	4–3	Bury	Burslem
	Poole; Llewellyn; Jackson; Portwood	Report		Stadium: Vale Park; Attendance: 14,453

14 January 1961 26	Chesterfield	0–0	Port Vale	Chesterfield, Derbyshire
		Report		Stadium: Saltergate; Attendance: 5,816

21 January 1961 27	Port Vale	4–0	Southend United	Burslem
	Llewellyn; Portwood; Jackson (pen.); Oscroft	Report		Stadium: Vale Park; Attendance: 9,517

4 February 1961 28	Reading	2–1	Port Vale	Reading, Berkshire
		Report	Portwood	Stadium: Elm Park; Attendance: 6,394

6 February 1961 29	Port Vale	3–0	Colchester United	Burslem
	Poole; Portwood	Report		Stadium: Vale Park; Attendance: 6,504

11 February 1961 30	Torquay United	1–1	Port Vale	Torquay
		Report	Oscroft	Stadium: Plainmoor; Attendance: 5,606

13 February 1961 31	Newport County	2–1	Port Vale	Newport, Wales
	McPherson; G. Smith	Report	Portwood	Stadium: Somerton Park; Attendance: 5,107

18 February 1961 32	Port Vale	4–1	Swindon Town	Burslem
	Llewellyn 1', 50', 57'; Oscroft 79'	Report	Jackson	Stadium: Vale Park; Attendance: 9,673; Referee: J. Powell

25 February 1961 33	Port Vale	3–2	Grimsby Town	Burslem
	Llewellyn; Portwood; Steele	Report		Stadium: Vale Park; Attendance: 9,367

28 February 1961 34	Bradford City	3–3	Port Vale	Bradford
		Report	Llewellyn; Steele	Stadium: Valley Parade; Attendance: 6,883

4 March 1961 35	Queens Park Rangers	1–0	Port Vale	Shepherd's Bush, West London
	Evans	Report		Stadium: Loftus Road; Attendance: 12,711

11 March 1961 36	Port Vale	1–3	Notts County	Burslem
	Miles	Report		Stadium: Vale Park; Attendance: 10,931

18 March 1961 37	Bournemouth & Boscombe Athletic	1–1	Port Vale	Bournemouth
		Report	Portwood	Stadium: Dean Court; Attendance: 8,735

25 March 1961 38	Port Vale	2–4	Bradford City	Burslem
	Poole; Llewellyn	Report		Stadium: Vale Park; Attendance: 6,278

31 March 1961 39	Port Vale	3–1	Coventry City	Burslem
	Llewellyn; Fidler	Report	own goal	Stadium: Vale Park; Attendance: 6,528

1 April 1961 40	Barnsley	5–1	Port Vale	Barnsley
		Report	Poole	Stadium: Oakwell; Attendance: 5,680

4 April 1961 41	Coventry City	1–1	Port Vale	Coventry
	Hill	Report	Jackson (pen.)	Stadium: Highfield Road; Attendance: 8,285

8 April 1961 42	Port Vale	3–1	Newport County	Burslem
	Fidler; Oscroft; Llewellyn	Report	McSeveney	Stadium: Vale Park; Attendance: 6,302

15 April 1961 43	Colchester United	2–0	Port Vale	Colchester
	King	Report		Stadium: Layer Road; Attendance: 3,437

22 April 1961 44	Port Vale	1–1	Bristol City	Burslem
	Llewellyn	Report		Stadium: Vale Park; Attendance: 4,068

25 April 1961 45	Brentford	0–0	Port Vale	Brentford, West London
		Report		Stadium: Griffin Park; Attendance: 3,503

29 April 1961 46	Hull City	2–2	Port Vale	Kingston upon Hull
15:00 BST	King 11'; Chilton 65'	Report	Llewellyn; Fidler	Stadium: Boothferry Park; Attendance: 4,439

=== FA Cup ===
5 November 1960 R1	Chelmsford City	2–3	Port Vale	Chelmsford
		Report	Portwood	Stadium: New Writtle Street Stadium; Attendance: 9,000

26 November 1960 R2	Port Vale	2–1	Carlisle United	Burslem
	Jackson; Fidler	Report		Stadium: Vale Park; Attendance: 12,113

7 January 1961 R3	Swansea Town	3–0	Port Vale	Swansea
		Report		Stadium: Vetch Field; Attendance: 10,601

=== League Cup ===
17 October 1960 R1	Queens Park Rangers	2–2	Port Vale	Shepherd's Bush, West London
	Lazarus; Rutter	Report	Steele	Stadium: Loftus Road; Attendance: 6,564

19 October 1960 Replay	Port Vale	3–1	Queens Park Rangers	Burslem
	Steele; Kinsey; Fidler	Report	Bedford	Stadium: Vale Park; Attendance: 6,829

24 October 1960 R2	Port Vale	0–2	Tranmere Rovers	Burslem
		Report		Stadium: Vale Park; Attendance: 8,206

=== Supporters' Clubs' Trophy ===
10 October 1960 Final 1st Leg	Port Vale	1–0	Stoke City	Burslem
	Steele			Stadium: Vale Park; Attendance: 7,267

7 March 1961 Final 2nd Leg	Stoke City	1–0 (1–1 agg.)	Port Vale	Stoke-upon-Trent
				Stadium: Victoria Ground; Attendance: 9,605

24 April 1961 Replay	Stoke City	1–0	Port Vale	Stoke-upon-Trent
	(og.)			Stadium: Victoria Ground; Attendance: 4,000

== Squad statistics ==
=== Appearances and goals ===
Key to positions: GK – Goalkeeper; DF – Defender; MF – Midfielder; FW – Forward

No.	Pos	Nat	Player	Total		Third Division		FA Cup		League Cup		Supporters' Club's Trophy	
No.	Pos	Nat	Player	Apps	Goals	Apps	Goals	Apps	Goals	Apps	Goals	Apps	Goals
	GK	(England) ENG	John Cooke	4	0	4	0	0	0	0	0	0	0
	GK	(England) ENG	Ken Hancock	47	0	39	0	3	0	3	0	2	0
	GK	(England) ENG	John Poole	4	0	3	0	0	0	0	0	1	0
	DF	(England) ENG	Terry Lowe	1	0	0	0	0	0	0	0	1	0
	DF	(England) ENG	David Raine	45	0	38	0	3	0	3	0	1	0
	DF	(England) ENG	Roy Sproson	52	0	43	0	3	0	3	0	3	0
	DF	(England) ENG	Selwyn Whalley	14	3	13	3	0	0	0	0	1	0
	MF	(England) ENG	Colin Corbishley	6	0	3	0	0	0	3	0	0	0
	MF	(England) ENG	Colin Davies	3	0	3	0	0	0	0	0	0	0
	MF	(England) ENG	Dennis Fidler	41	13	34	11	3	1	2	1	2	0
	MF	(England) ENG	Peter Ford	50	0	41	0	3	0	3	0	3	0
	MF	(England) ENG	Roy Gater	3	0	2	0	0	0	0	0	1	0
	MF	(England) ENG	Peter Hall	4	0	3	0	0	0	0	0	1	0
	MF	(England) ENG	Brian Jackson	49	10	43	8	3	2	1	0	2	0
	MF	(England) ENG	Terry Miles	55	3	46	3	3	0	3	0	3	0
	MF	(England) ENG	Harry Oscroft	22	5	21	5	0	0	0	0	1	0
	MF	(England) ENG	Cliff Portwood	49	26	41	24	3	2	3	0	2	0
	FW	(England) ENG	John Archer	4	0	4	0	0	0	0	0	0	0
	FW	(England) ENG	Ted Calland	13	3	12	3	1	0	0	0	0	0
	FW	(England) ENG	Barry Hancock	3	0	2	0	0	0	0	0	1	0
	FW	(Wales) WAL	Noel Kinsey	6	1	3	0	0	0	3	1	0	0
	FW	(England) ENG	Bert Llewellyn	30	20	28	20	2	0	0	0	0	0
	FW	(England) ENG	Harry Poole	54	7	45	7	3	0	3	0	3	0
Players who featured but departed the club during the season:
	MF	(England) ENG	Albert Leake	0	0	0	0	0	0	0	0	0	0
	FW	(England) ENG	Stan Steele	43	14	35	10	3	0	3	3	2	1

=== Top scorers ===
Place	Position	Nation	Name	Third Division	FA Cup	League Cup	Other	Total
1	MF	England	Cliff Portwood	24	2	0	0	26
2	FW	England	Bert Llewellyn	20	0	0	0	20
3	FW	England	Stan Steele	10	0	3	1	14
4	MF	England	Dennis Fidler	11	1	1	0	13
5	MF	England	Brian Jackson	8	2	0	0	10
6	FW	England	Harry Poole	7	0	0	0	7
7	MF	England	Harry Oscroft	5	0	0	0	5
8	FW	England	Ted Calland	3	0	0	0	3
–	MF	England	Terry Miles	3	0	0	0	3
–	DF	England	Selwyn Whalley	3	0	0	0	3
11	FW	Wales	Noel Kinsey	0	0	1	0	1
–	–	–	Own goals	2	0	0	1	3
			TOTALS	98	4	5	2	109

== Transfers ==
=== Transfers in ===
Date from	Position	Nationality	Name	From	Fee	Ref.
1960	FW	ENG	Derek Edge	Stoke City	Free transfer	
May 1960	MF	ENG	Dennis Fidler	Manchester City	Free transfer	
June 1960	DF	ENG	Terry Lowe	Stoke City	Free transfer	
August 1960	FW	ENG	Ted Calland	Exeter City	Free transfer	
November 1960	FW	ENG	Bert Llewellyn	Everton	£7,000	

=== Transfers out ===
Date from	Position	Nationality	Name	To	Fee	Ref.
January 1961	MF	ENG	Albert Leake	Macclesfield Town	Free transfer	
March 1961	FW	ENG	Stan Steele	West Bromwich Albion	£10,000	
May 1961	FW	ENG	John Archer	Bournemouth & Boscombe Athletic	Free transfer	
May 1961	FW	ENG	Dennis Bailey		Released	
May 1961	DF	ENG	Colin Davies	Stourbridge	Free transfer	
May 1961	MF	ENG	Peter Hall	Bournemouth & Boscombe Athletic	Free transfer	
May 1961	MF	ENG	Harry Oscroft	Brantham Athletic	Free transfer	
May 1961	GK	ENG	John Poole	Macclesfield Town	Free transfer	
July 1961	FW	ENG	Ted Calland	Lincoln City	Free transfer	
July 1961	MF	ENG	Cliff Portwood	Grimsby Town	£6,000	
