= Colin Davies =

English footballer

Personal information
- Full name: Colin Frank Davies
- Date of birth: 12 April 1936 (age 90)
- Place of birth: Shrewsbury, England
- Position: Centre-half

Senior career*
Years	Team	Apps	(Gls)
1958–1961	Port Vale	13	(0)
- Stourbridge
1961–1963	Macclesfield Town	65	(20)
- * Club domestic league appearances and goals

Colin Frank Davies (born 12 April 1936) is an English former footballer who played at centre-half for Port Vale and Stourbridge.

== Career ==
Davies joined Port Vale as an amateur in May 1958 and signed as a professional in June 1959. After making his debut at Vale Park in a goalless draw with Queen's Park Rangers on 19 March 1960, he played in the nine remaining Third Division games of the season. However, Peter Ford had already established himself in the centre of midfield and retained his place the next season, at the expense of Davies. Ford only missed five games of that season and Davies filled in for three of these. Davies was given a free transfer by "Valiants" manager Norman Low in May 1961 and moved on to Stourbridge.

== Career statistics ==
Appearances and goals by club, season and competition
Club	Season	League			FA Cup		Total	
Club	Season	Division	Apps	Goals	Apps	Goals	Apps	Goals
Port Vale	1959–60	Third Division	10	0	0	0	10	0
Port Vale	1960–61	Third Division	3	0	0	0	3	0
Port Vale	Total		13	0	0	0	13	0
