= Jack Wilkinson (footballer, born 1931) =

English footballer

Personal information
- Full name: Jack Wilkinson
- Date of birth: 17 September 1931
- Place of birth: Middlewich, England
- Date of death: 10 April 1996 (aged 64)
- Place of death: Winsford, England
- Height: 6 ft 0 in (1.83 m)
- Position: Centre-forward

Youth career
- 1948–1950: Middlewich Athletic Rangers

Senior career*
Years	Team	Apps	(Gls)
1950–1953	Witton Albion		
1953–1956	Arsenal	1	(0)
1956–1957	Sheffield United	29	(16)
1957–1959	Port Vale	80	(39)
1959–1961	Exeter City	48	(26)
1962–1963	Wellington Town		
1963–1964	Witton Albion		
1964–1965	Murgatroyd's		
1965–1966	Winsford United		
Total		158+	(81+)
- * Club domestic league appearances and goals

Jack Wilkinson (17 September 1931 – 10 April 1996) was an English footballer who played as a centre-forward in the Football League for eight years. He scored 81 goals in 158 league games, a record of a goal every two appearances.

He moved from Witton Albion to Arsenal in October 1953. He featured only once for the "Gunners" before moving on to Sheffield United in March 1956. He switched to Port Vale in June 1957 and helped the "Valiants" to the Fourth Division title in 1958–59. He was sold to Exeter City for a £2,500 fee in October 1959 before entering non-League football in 1961 with Wellington Town.

== Career ==
Wilkinson played for Middlewich Athletic Rangers and Witton Albion, making his debut for Witton on 23 August 1952 and scoring 17 goals from 39 games in the 1952–53 season and scoring 10 goals in 14 games at the start of the 1953–54 campaign. He moved into League football with Tom Whittaker's Arsenal in October 1953. He was a reserve to Cliff Holton. He made just one competitive appearance, in a First Division game against Leicester City on 19 February 1955 which Arsenal drew 1–1. Despite consistently scoring for Arsenal's reserves, he was never given another first-team opportunity at Highbury, and transferred to Sheffield United in March 1956 for £5,000. Joe Mercer's "Blades" were relegated out of the top-flight with a last-place finish in 1955–56, and could only manage a seventh-place finish in the Second Division in 1956–57. Wilkinson scored 16 goals in 29 league games during his time at Bramall Lane.

Wilkinson thereafter signed with Norman Low's Port Vale in June 1957, a move which suited him as his home with wife and two children was in nearby Middlewich. He scored a total of 19 goals in 44 appearances in the 1957–58 season. However, his goals could not prevent the "Valiants" finishing within the lower half of the Third Division South table and thereby become founding members of the inaugural Football League Fourth Division. He then scored 21 goals in 34 games in Port Vale's campaign of 1958–59, wherein Vale stormed to promotion as the Fourth Division's inaugural champions. Some of the other members of Vale's highly effective front line for that season included Harry Poole, Stan Steele and Noel Kinsey. Having scored just once in six league games at the start of the 1959–60 season, he was sold to Exeter City for a £2,500 fee in October 1959. Wilkinson was flown down to St James Park by helicopter to sign with the club and went on to score on his debut for the "Grecians". He also helped Frank Broome's side post a ninth-place finish in the Fourth Division of the 1959–60 season. He was transfer-listed by his own request in January 1961 as his wife wished to move back to the Cheshire area. The club had to apply for re-election in the 1960–61 season. Despite boasting a record of 26 goals in 48 league games for Exeter, Wilkinson moved back into non-League with Wellington Town. He scored six goals in 16 games back at Witton Albion in the 1962–63 season and then scored a further five goals from 25 games in the 1963–64 season. He later played for Murgatroyd's and served Winsford United as a player-coach.

== Career statistics ==
Appearances and goals by club, season and competition
Club	Season	League			FA Cup		Total	
Club	Season	Division	Apps	Goals	Apps	Goals	Apps	Goals
Arsenal	1954–55	First Division	1	0	0	0	1	0
Sheffield United	1955–56	First Division	12	6	0	0	12	6
Sheffield United	1956–57	Second Division	17	10	0	0	17	10
Sheffield United	Total		29	16	0	0	29	16
Port Vale	1957–58	Third Division South	41	17	3	2	44	19
Port Vale	1958–59	Fourth Division	33	21	1	0	34	21
Port Vale	1959–60	Third Division	6	1	0	0	6	1
Port Vale	Total		80	39	4	2	84	41
Exeter City	1959–60	Fourth Division	29	16	3	1	32	17
Exeter City	1960–61	Fourth Division	19	10	1	0	20	1
Exeter City	Total		48	26	4	1	52	27
Career total			158	81	8	3	166	84

== Honours ==
Port Vale

- Football League Fourth Division: 1958–59
