= Terry Miles =

English footballer (1937–2025)

Personal information
- Full name: Terence Miles
- Date of birth: 7 May 1937
- Place of birth: Hartshill, Staffordshire, England
- Date of death: 27 June 2025 (aged 88)
- Position: Midfielder

Youth career
- Milton Youth Club
- 1955–1957: Port Vale

Senior career*
| Years | Team | Apps | (Gls) |
| 1957–1968 | Port Vale | 365 | (17) |
- Sandbach Ramblers
- Eastwood
- * Club domestic league appearances and goals

Terrence Miles (7 May 1937 – 27 June 2025) was an English professional footballer. A midfielder, he played for Port Vale between 1955 and 1968, helping them to the Fourth Division title in 1958–59. He later turned out for Sandbach Ramblers and Eastwood before returning to Vale Park as a coach.

== Playing career ==
Born in Stoke-on-Trent, Miles attended Carmountside Secondary Modern and played for Milton Youth Club alongside Harry Poole. He worked in Hanley at Smith and Warrilow pottery firm for 18 months before becoming a professional footballer. Miles joined Port Vale in June 1955 and made his debut in a 2–1 defeat to Huddersfield Town on 30 March 1957. He went on to make five Second Division appearances in the 1956–57 relegation season. He played six games in the Third Division South in the 1957–58 season. He then became a first-team regular and missed only one match of the 1958–59 Fourth Division title-winning season. He played 41 games in the 1959–60 season, as the "Valiants" posted a mid-table finish in the Third Division under the stewardship of Norman Low. He also scored his first goal in the Football League, in a 2–1 win over Norwich City at Vale Park on 23 January. However, he was diagnosed with Tuberculosis, along with teammate Peter Ford, and spent 12 weeks in hospital recovering after the disease was fortunately caught in the early stages. He was an ever-present in the 55 game 1960–61 season, and bagged three goals against Chesterfield and in both fixtures with Notts County.

Miles played 52 matches in the 1961–62 campaign. He retained his place under new boss Freddie Steele in the 1962–63 season, playing 41 games and claiming three goals against Reading, Bradford Park Avenue, and Bristol Rovers. However, he featured just 27 times in the 1963–64 season, finding the net against Southend United and Colchester United. He posted 35 appearances in the 1964–65 season, and bagged goals against Peterborough United (2), Bristol City, Brentford, and Southend United; Vale were relegated at the end of the season, despite the introduction of new boss Jackie Mudie. Miles became the club's first ever playing substitute in the Football League in a 2–0 home win over Stockport County on 4 September 1965. He went on to play 30 games in the 1965–66 season as Vale struggled at the foot of the Fourth Division table.

Miles played 45 games in the 1966–67 campaign, and found the net against Exeter City, Newport County, and Stockport County. He was given a testimonial match, shared with Harry Poole, in August 1967; the testimonial featured names such as Nat Lofthouse, Terry Alcock, Neil Franklin, Jimmy O'Neill, Ken Barnes and Ronnie Allen. However, Miles lost his first-team place under new manager Stanley Matthews, and played only 22 games in the 1967–68 season. He was given a free transfer to semi-professional club Sandbach Ramblers in May 1968, alongside Harry Poole. Miles later played for Eastwood. Norman Low tried to get him to sign for the Cleveland Stokers, but Miles declined as he did not wish to move abroad.

== Style of play ==
Miles was a "composed and dependable" midfielder.

== Coaching career ==
Upon his retirement as a footballer, Miles became the coach and assistant manager of Wolstanton Park Rangers and then schoolboy coach for Port Vale. He left the club after they turned down his recommendation to sign a teenage Adrian Heath. He worked at a Michelin factory for 26 years and also played for the work's team.

== Personal life and death ==
Miles married Maureen in 1960 following a long courtship; the couple had two daughters. Miles died on 27 June 2025, at the age of 88.

== Career statistics ==
Appearances and goals by club, season and competition
| Club | Season | League | | | FA Cup | | Other | | Total | |
| Club | Season | Division | Apps | Goals | Apps | Goals | Apps | Goals | Apps | Goals |
|---|---|---|---|---|---|---|---|---|---|---|
| Port Vale | 1956–57 | Second Division | 5 | 0 | 0 | 0 | — | | 5 | 0 |
| Port Vale | 1957–58 | Third Division South | 6 | 0 | 0 | 0 | — | | 6 | 0 |
| Port Vale | 1958–59 | Fourth Division | 45 | 0 | 1 | 0 | — | | 46 | 0 |
| Port Vale | 1959–60 | Third Division | 34 | 1 | 6 | 0 | — | | 40 | 1 |
| Port Vale | 1960–61 | Third Division | 46 | 3 | 3 | 0 | 6 | 0 | 55 | 3 |
| Port Vale | 1961–62 | Third Division | 44 | 0 | 7 | 0 | 1 | 0 | 52 | 0 |
| Port Vale | 1962–63 | Third Division | 37 | 3 | 3 | 0 | 1 | 0 | 41 | 3 |
| Port Vale | 1963–64 | Third Division | 24 | 2 | 2 | 0 | 1 | 0 | 27 | 2 |
| Port Vale | 1964–65 | Third Division | 33 | 5 | 1 | 0 | 1 | 0 | 35 | 5 |
| Port Vale | 1965–66 | Fourth Division | 28 | 0 | 1 | 0 | 1 | 0 | 30 | 0 |
| Port Vale | 1966–67 | Fourth Division | 42 | 3 | 3 | 0 | 0 | 0 | 45 | 3 |
| Port Vale | 1967–68 | Fourth Division | 21 | 0 | 0 | 0 | 1 | 0 | 22 | 0 |
| Port Vale | Total | | 365 | 17 | 27 | 0 | 12 | 0 | 407 | 17 |

== Honours ==
Port Vale

- Football League Fourth Division: 1958–59
