= John Archer (footballer, born 1941) =

English footballer (1941–2021)

Personal information
- Full name: John Archer
- Date of birth: 18 June 1941
- Place of birth: Biddulph, England
- Date of death: 12 December 2021 (aged 80)
- Positions: Inside forward; midfielder

Youth career
- Port Vale

Senior career*
Years	Team	Apps	(Gls)
1958–1961	Port Vale	10	(3)
1961–1966	Bournemouth & Boscombe Athletic	139	(37)
1966–1968	Crewe Alexandra	59	(16)
1968–1969	→ Huddersfield Town (loan)	9	(0)
1969–1972	Chesterfield	116	(24)
1972–1974	Sandbach Ramblers		
1974–1975	Congleton Town		
1982	Nantwich Town		
Total		335	(82)

Managerial career
- 1972–1974: Sandbach Ramblers (player-manager)
- 1982: Nantwich Town (player-manager)
- * Club domestic league appearances and goals

John Archer (18 June 1941 – 12 December 2021) was an English footballer who played as a midfielder and inside forward for five professional teams.

He began his career with Port Vale in July 1958 before moving on to Bournemouth & Boscombe Athletic in May 1961. Five years later, he signed with Crewe Alexandra for a £3,000 fee. He helped the club to win promotion out of the Fourth Division in 1967–68. He was sold to Huddersfield Town for £8,000 in January 1968. He then signed with Chesterfield for a £1,000 fee in May 1969, and captained the club to the Fourth Division title in 1969–70. He later played for Sandbach Ramblers, Congleton Town and Nantwich Town, and scouted for Chesterfield.

== Career ==
=== Port Vale ===
Archer graduated through the Port Vale junior squad to sign as a professional in July 1958. He made his Third Division debut in the 1959–60 campaign under manager Norman Low. He scored twice against Wrexham in a 3–1 victory at Vale Park on 16 April 1960, finishing the campaign with three goals in six games. However, he featured just four times on 1960–61 and was moved on to league rivals Bournemouth & Boscombe Athletic on a free transfer in May 1961, then managed by Bill McGarry.

=== Bournemouth & Boscombe Athletic ===
He scored two goals on his club debut. Bournemouth were pushing promotion and finished in third place, three points short of promotion in 1961–62. They finished fifth place in 1962–63, six points short of their target. A fourth-place finish followed in 1963–64, four points shy of promotion. They then dropped to eleventh place in 1964–65 under Reg Flewin. Archer left the club following a further slip down the table in 1965–66 under Freddie Cox's stewardship. He scored 37 goals in 139 league games on the south coast.

=== Crewe Alexandra ===
He then moved on to Ernie Tagg's Crewe Alexandra for a £3,000 fee and was converted from an inside forward into a midfielder. Crewe were aiming for promotion in the Fourth Division, but the "Railwaymen" finished fifth in 1966–67, four points short of promotion. Crewe won promotion the following season, though Archer left the club midway through.

=== Huddersfield Town ===
In January 1968, Archer was sold to Huddersfield Town for a fee of £8,000 plus a player in exchange. He played nine Second Division games without scoring under Tom Johnston in the 1967–68 campaign and struggled with injuries.

=== Chesterfield ===
Archer remained in the Fourth Division after putting pen to paper with Chesterfield, where he was also appointed club captain after being signed for a £1,000 fee in May 1969; manager Jimmy McGuigan could have signed him on a free transfer but decided to authorise the transfer fee to prevent other clubs from making Archer an offer. After finishing just one place and two points above the re-election zone in 1968–69, the "Spireites" topped the division in 1969–70; Archer scored two goals direct from corners during the 1969–70 season. They then finished fifth in 1970–71, nine points short of a second-successive promotion. He took over penalty, taking duties from Kevin Randall in 1971. Archer retired after the club finished in mid-table in 1971–72. Fans nicknamed him Dan Archer after The Archers radio programme. He played a total of 129 games for Chesterfield, scoring 24 goals.

== Style of play ==
Able to play as an inside forward or midfielder, Archer was a slow, stocky and aggressive player who had good technical qualities, vision and set piece ability. These abilities made up for a lack of pace, whilst his leadership compensated for his occasional lack of discipline.

== Later life ==
After retiring from the professional game, Archer became player-manager of Sandbach Ramblers and also appeared for Congleton Town before holding the managerial reins at Nantwich Town from January 1982 to the end of the season. He also scouted in Wales and the West Country for former club Chesterfield. He also worked as a greenkeeper at Malkins Bank course, near Sandbach. He also served as the President of the Wrekin Federation of Pigeon Fanciers.

Archer died in December 2021, aged 80.

== Career statistics ==
Appearances and goals by club, season and competition
Club	Season	League			FA Cup		League Cup		Total	
Club	Season	Division	Apps	Goals	Apps	Goals	Apps	Goals	Apps	Goals
Port Vale	1959–60	Third Division	6	3	0	0	—		6	3
Port Vale	1960–61	Third Division	4	0	0	0	0	0	4	0
Port Vale	Total		10	3	0	0	0	0	10	3
Bournemouth & Boscombe Athletic	1961–62	Third Division	42	13	1	0	3	0	46	13
Bournemouth & Boscombe Athletic	1962–63	Third Division	21	4	1	0	1	0	23	4
Bournemouth & Boscombe Athletic	1963–64	Third Division	11	5	1	0	3	0	15	5
Bournemouth & Boscombe Athletic	1964–65	Third Division	40	11	2	0	1	0	43	11
Bournemouth & Boscombe Athletic	1965–66	Third Division	25	4	4	2	2	1	31	7
Bournemouth & Boscombe Athletic	Total		139	37	9	2	10	1	158	40
Crewe Alexandra	1966–67	Fourth Division	34	6	3	0	0	0	37	6
Crewe Alexandra	1967–68	Fourth Division	25	10	1	1	2	1	28	12
Crewe Alexandra	Total		59	16	4	1	2	1	65	18
Huddersfield Town	1967–68	Second Division	9	0	0	0	0	0	9	0
Chesterfield	1969–70	Fourth Division	42	12	1	0	3	1	46	13
Chesterfield	1970–71	Third Division	45	6	3	0	1	0	49	6
Chesterfield	1971–72	Third Division	29	6	3	0	3	1	35	7
Chesterfield	Total		116	24	7	0	7	2	130	26
Career total			333	80	20	3	19	4	372	87

== Honours ==
Chesterfield

- Football League Fourth Division: 1969–70
