= Selwyn Whalley =

English footballer (1934–2008)

Personal information
- Full name: Selwyn Davies Whalley
- Date of birth: 24 February 1934
- Place of birth: Tunstall, Stoke-on-Trent, England
- Date of death: 8 August 2008 (aged 74)
- Place of death: Stoke-on-Trent, England
- Position: Right-back

Senior career*
Years	Team	Apps	(Gls)
1953–1966	Port Vale	178	(7)
Total		178	(7)
- * Club domestic league appearances and goals

Selwyn Davies Whalley (24 February 1934 – 8 August 2008) is an English former footballer. A right-back, he was a one club man with a 15-year career at Port Vale. He made 196 league and cup appearances for the club before retiring due to a foot injury in May 1966. He helped the club to win the Fourth Division title in 1958–59. He spent most of his career as a part-time player and working as a teacher.

Whalley died on 8 August 2008, at the age of 74, following an 18-month battle against prostate cancer. He was survived by his wife Lesley, son Martyn, daughters Joanne and Philippa and grandson Daniel. He died days apart from former teammate Ken Griffiths.

== Career ==
Whalley was born in Tunstall, Stoke-on-Trent, and grew up supporting Port Vale. He joined his boyhood club as a professional in August 1953, he made his debut at right-half in a 3–2 defeat by Bristol Rovers on 13 April 1957 at Vale Park. He went on to play five further Second Division games in the 1956–57 season, as Norman Low's "Valiants" suffered relegation into the Third Division South. However, after taking up a teaching position in September 1957 his opportunities were limited. His teaching duties limited him to 13 appearances in 1957–58, though he did score his first senior goal on 8 March, in a 5–0 home win over Watford. At the end of the season a re-structuring of the Football League meant that Vale became founder members of the Fourth Division.

An example of his teaching duties got in the way of his footballing career was on Monday, 8 September 1958, when he played in the 5–0 win by Hartlepool United at Victoria Park, arriving back the next morning just in time to start his first class at Hanley High School. He played a total of 11 games in 1958–59, as the club won the Fourth Division title. He made 12 Third Division appearances in 1959–60, finding the net twice in a 4–3 defeat to Newport County at Somerton Park on 19 October. He played 14 games in 1960–61, scoring twice in a 3–2 win over Brentford on 3 October and once in a 4–3 win over Bristol City at Ashton Gate five days later.

Whalley played 48 games in 1961–62, scoring once in a 1–0 home win over Notts County on 25 September. However, he was limited to 21 games in 1962–63, after new boss Freddie Steele took charge of the club and led the Vale to within four points of promotion. He managed to make 47 appearances in the 1963–64 campaign, finding the net once in a 2–1 win over Bradford City at Valley Parade in an FA Cup first round win on 16 November. He went on to feature in the Vale's fourth round goalless draw with Liverpool at Anfield in front of 52,327 supporters; the "Reds" won the replay 2–1. Whalley featured 16 times in 1964–65, as the club suffered relegation under new boss Jackie Mudie. He made seven Fourth Division appearances in 1965–66, before he retired in May 1966 due to a foot injury. He shared a testimonial match with Roy Sproson two years earlier. He made 196 appearances and scored eight goals in all competitions during his 13 years in Burslem.

== Career statistics ==
Appearances and goals by club, season and competition
Club	Season	League			FA Cup		League Cup		Supporters' Clubs' Trophy		Total	
Club	Season	Division	Apps	Goals	Apps	Goals	Apps	Goals	Apps	Goals	Apps	Goals
Port Vale	1953–54	Third Division North	0	0	0	0	0	0	—		0	0
Port Vale	1954–55	Second Division	0	0	0	0	0	0	—		0	0
Port Vale	1955–56	Second Division	0	0	0	0	0	0	—		0	0
Port Vale	1956–57	Second Division	6	0	0	0	0	0	—		6	0
Port Vale	1957–58	Third Division South	13	1	0	0	0	0	—		13	1
Port Vale	1958–59	Fourth Division	11	0	0	0	0	0	—		11	0
Port Vale	1959–60	Third Division	12	2	0	0	0	0	1	0	13	2
Port Vale	1960–61	Third Division	13	3	0	0	0	0	1	0	14	3
Port Vale	1961–62	Third Division	40	1	7	0	1	0	0	0	48	1
Port Vale	1962–63	Third Division	20	0	1	0	0	0	0	0	21	0
Port Vale	1963–64	Third Division	41	0	5	1	1	0	0	0	47	1
Port Vale	1964–65	Third Division	15	0	1	0	0	0	0	0	16	0
Port Vale	1965–66	Fourth Division	7	0	0	0	0	0	0	0	7	0
Port Vale	Total		178	7	14	1	2	0	2	0	196	8
Career total			178	7	14	1	2	0	2	0	196	8

== Honours ==
Port Vale

- Football League Fourth Division: 1958–59
