= 1958–59 Port Vale F.C. season =

Port Vale F.C.
1958–59 season
- Chairman: Jake Bloom
- Manager: Norman Low
- Stadium: Vale Park
- Football League Fourth Division: 1st (64 points)
- FA Cup: First Round (eliminated by Torquay United)
- Top goalscorer: League: Stan Steele (22); All: Stan Steele (22)
- Highest home attendance: 20,916 vs. Coventry City, 4 April 1959
- Lowest home attendance: 8,851 vs. Chester, 21 February 1959
- Average home league attendance: 12,757
- Biggest win: 8–0 vs. Gateshead, 26 December 1958
- Biggest defeat: 1–4 vs. Northampton Town, 23 August 1958
Home colours

The 1958–59 season was Port Vale's 47th season of football in the English Football League and their first season in the newly created Fourth Division following their relegation from the Third Division South. Under manager Norman Low, Vale stormed to the Fourth Division championship, amassing 64 points, finishing four clear of Coventry City, and scoring a club-record 110 league goals across 46 matches.

A potent forward line — with Stan Steele, Jack Wilkinson, Graham Barnett, Harry Poole, and John Cunliffe all reaching double figures — drove the attack and provided consistent goal returns. In the FA Cup, Vale were surprisingly eliminated in the First Round, with a narrow defeat at Torquay United denying further progress. At home, Vale Park saw an average attendance of 12,757, dropping to a low of 8,851 against Chester on 21 February 1959 and a high of 20,916 against Coventry City on 4 April 1959 — reflecting solid support for a dominant campaign despite an early cup exit.

Several landmark achievements defined the season; notably, Vale endured a rough start with just two points from their first five home games, before turning Vale Park into a fortress. A mid‑season unbeaten run of twelve league games, capped by an emphatic 8–0 Boxing Day victory over Gateshead, underlined their attacking might. Manager Norman Low reinforced the squad with astute signings such as Brian Jackson, Roy Pritchard, Peter Hall, and debutants Ken Hancock and Graham Barnett, whose contributions proved decisive. Veteran stalwart Roy Sproson also returned to defensive duties, anchoring a side filled with goals and cohesion.

For Port vale, the overall campaign, represented goalscoring, a division title, record, forward performances, which made them back into the league pyramid.

== Overview ==
=== Fourth Division ===
The pre-season saw the arrival of the 'speedy and direct' winger Brian Jackson (signed from Liverpool for £2,000), experienced left-back Roy Pritchard (Notts County), and Peter Hall (Stoke City). There was also a change of chairman, as Jake Bloom took charge. He initiated a change of kit, as Vale played in black and amber striped jerseys with black shorts.

The season opened with a 4–1 home defeat by Northampton Town, Andy Woan scoring the first goal of the new division. Roy Sproson was then dropped from the first XI, and Vale failed to find a win in Burslem until 29 September. Their away form proved to be outstanding though, as the team recorded seven wins in their first nine away fixtures. On 8 September, Vale won 5–1 at Hartlepools United, with John Cunliffe missing a penalty which would have given him a hat-trick. Another four-goal margin of victory came at Aldershot 12 days later. On 24 September, Vale Park saw its first match under the new £17,000 floodlights, as the club beat West Bromwich Albion (who included Ronnie Allen in their line-up) by five goals to three in front of a crowd of 13,000, with Jack Wilkinson claiming a hat-trick. With a 4–1 win over Southport five days later, The Sentinel's 'T.G.F.' remarked that "the spell is broken". Vale remained unbeaten at home for the rest of the season. Strong in attack, the club took until 11 October before failing to score, in a goalless draw with Oldham Athletic witnessed by Shirley Bassey (as a guest of Norman Low). A fortnight later Vale failed to beat Carlisle United, as referee J.G.Williams blew the full-time whistle just as a Wilkinson header was floating into the opposition's net. On 8 November, Vale beat Exeter City 5–3 in a top-of-the-table clash. Two consecutive away defeats followed soon after, as Vale fell to third. The 4–2 loss in an 'appalling mud bath' at The Den saw the débuts of keeper Ken Hancock and striker Graham Barnett.

A twelve-match unbeaten run followed, taking Vale four points clear at the top. This included a triumphant 8–0 Boxing day win over Gateshead, a Vale Park record and their biggest win since 24 September 1932, with their opponents "humiliated and reduced to the point of despair". It was followed by a 4–0 win at Redheugh Park on New Year's Day. Roy Sproson was then brought back into the defensive line, whilst up front Stan Steele 'did the work of two men', Harry Poole brought 'flexibility and fluidity', and Barnett scored from half-chances. Just as Vale seemed to be running away with the title, defeat came on 16 March at Highfield Road to second-placed Coventry City. Another defeat came against Crewe Alexandra on 27 March. The following month, the Valiants beat the Sky Blues 3–0, taking them six points ahead of the chasing pack. Promotion was secured on 18 April with a 1–1 draw at home to Darlington, and the title was secured on the final day with victory over Millwall. The 5–2 win over Millwall had been superfluous as second-placed Coventry City had lost their final game away at Hartlepools United by half-time in Vale's game; the Vale game had kicked off later in the evening as Vale Park had new floodlights.

They finished as champions with 64 points, four points clear of second, and seven points clear of fifth spot. They had secured twelve victories on the road, as despite nobody recording a hat-trick all season, a club-record 110 goals were scored – with five players reaching double-figures. The defence was also strong, only Coventry and York City conceded fewer. Praise came in for manager Norman Low, who in turn praised Barnett as 'the supreme goal poacher', Hancock as 'the find of the season', whilst Steele was 'the model of consistency'.

=== Finances ===
On the financial side, gate receipts rose by 20% to £39,934, whilst there was a transfer credit of £6,075. Wages had risen to £26,535; however, the club's Sportsmen's Association donated £9,069 to give the club a profit of £8,595. Pleased with his players, Low only released Alan Martin (Northwich Victoria) and reserve Ken Higgs (who went on to enjoy a successful cricket career). The stadium received an upgrade, as the Bycars End was terraced, increased capacity by 6,500 to 50,000, extended the car park, and installed additional drains.

=== FA Cup ===
In the FA Cup, Vale were eliminated in the first round after being defeated 1–0 by Torquay United at Plainmoor.

== Results ==
=== Football League Fourth Division ===
==== League table ====
Pos	Team	Pld	W	D	L	GF	GA	GAv	Pts	Promotion or relegation
1	Port Vale (C, P)	46	26	12	8	110	58	1.897	64	Promotion to the Third Division
2	Coventry City (P)	46	24	12	10	84	47	1.787	60	Promotion to the Third Division
3	York City (P)	46	21	18	7	73	52	1.404	60	Promotion to the Third Division
4	Shrewsbury Town (P)	46	24	10	12	101	63	1.603	58	Promotion to the Third Division
5	Exeter City	46	23	11	12	87	61	1.426	57	

Source: rsssf.com
(C) Division Champions; (P) Promoted

==== Results by matchday ====
Round	1	2	3	4	5	6	7	8	9	10	11	12	13	14	15	16	17	18	19	20	21	22	23	24	25	26	27	28	29	30	31	32	33	34	35	36	37	38	39	40	41	42	43	44	45	46
Ground	H	A	A	H	H	A	A	H	A	A	H	H	A	H	H	A	H	A	H	H	A	A	A	H	A	H	H	H	A	H	A	H	H	A	A	H	A	A	H	H	A	A	H	A	A	H
Result	L	W	D	L	D	W	W	D	W	D	L	W	W	W	D	W	D	W	W	W	L	L	W	W	W	W	W	W	D	W	W	W	W	W	L	W	L	W	D	W	L	D	D	D	D	W
Position	17	15	13	17	17	9	6	7	4	6	9	6	4	3	3	3	3	3	1	1	1	3	2	2	2	2	2	1	2	2	2	1	1	1	1	1	1	1	1	1	1	1	1	1	1	1
Points	0	2	3	3	4	6	8	9	11	12	12	14	16	18	19	21	22	24	26	28	28	28	30	32	34	36	38	40	41	43	45	47	49	51	51	53	53	55	57	58	58	59	60	61	62	64

Source: Statto
A = Away; H = Home; W = Win; D = Draw; L = Loss

==== Matches ====
23 August 1958 1	Port Vale	1–4	Northampton Town	Burslem
15:00 BST	Wilkinson	Report	Woan 1'; Hawkings; Kirkup	Stadium: Vale Park; Attendance: 15,018

26 August 1958 2	Watford	0–2	Port Vale	Watford
		Report	Jackson; Poole	Stadium: Vicarage Road; Attendance: 11,948

30 August 1958 3	Workington	2–2	Port Vale	Workington
		Report	(og.); Steele	Stadium: Borough Park; Attendance: 5,998

1 September 1958 4	Port Vale	1–3	Watford	Burslem
	Poole	Report	Gavin; Meadows	Stadium: Vale Park; Attendance: 10,458

6 September 1958 5	Port Vale	2–2	York City	Burslem
	Steele; Wilkinson	Report		Stadium: Vale Park; Attendance: 10,104

8 September 1958 6	Hartlepools United	1–5	Port Vale	Hartlepool
	Anderson 67' (pen.)	Report	Wilkinson 18', 25'; Cunliffe 68', 85'; Steele 78'	Stadium: Victoria Park; Attendance: 6,158; Referee: J Cook

13 September 1958 7	Bradford (Park Avenue)	0–2	Port Vale	Bradford
		Report	Wilkinson; Steele	Stadium: Park Avenue; Attendance: 9,683

15 September 1958 8	Port Vale	1–1	Hartlepools United	Burslem
	Wilkinson 48'	Report	Mitchell 32'	Stadium: Vale Park; Attendance: 9,313; Referee: W Hickson

20 September 1958 9	Aldershot	0–4	Port Vale	Aldershot
		Report	Poole; Steele; Cunliffe (og.)	Stadium: Recreation Ground; Attendance: 6,211

23 September 1958 10	Southport	2–2	Port Vale	Southport
		Report	Steele; Wilkinson	Stadium: Haig Avenue; Attendance: 3,274

27 September 1958 11	Port Vale	2–3	Crystal Palace	Burslem
	Poole; Hall	Report		Stadium: Vale Park; Attendance: 13,952

29 September 1958 12	Port Vale	4–1	Southport	Burslem
	Poole; Cunliffe; Wilkinson	Report		Stadium: Vale Park; Attendance: 9,788

4 October 1958 13	Chester	1–2	Port Vale	Chester
	Webster	Report	Steele	Stadium: Sealand Road; Attendance: 8,197

6 October 1958 14	Port Vale	3–1	Torquay United	Burslem
	Wilkinson; Hall	Report		Stadium: Vale Park; Attendance: 13,102

11 October 1958 15	Port Vale	0–0	Oldham Athletic	Burslem
		Report		Stadium: Vale Park; Attendance: 13,432

18 October 1958 16	Barrow	1–2	Port Vale	Barrow-in-Furness
		Report	Wilkinson; Cunliffe	Stadium: Holker Street; Attendance: 4,909

25 October 1958 17	Port Vale	1–1	Carlisle United	Burslem
	Wilkinson (pen.)	Report		Stadium: Vale Park; Attendance: 12,894

1 November 1958 18	Gillingham	0–2	Port Vale	Gillingham, Kent
		Report	Jackson; Steele	Stadium: Priestfield Stadium; Attendance: 9,940

8 November 1958 19	Port Vale	5–3	Exeter City	Burslem
	Steele; Poole; Jackson; Cunliffe	Report	Rees	Stadium: Vale Park; Attendance: 14,282

22 November 1958 20	Port Vale	2–0	Shrewsbury Town	Burslem
	Poole; Wilkinson	Report		Stadium: Vale Park; Attendance: 12,047

29 November 1958 21	Darlington	2–0	Port Vale	Darlington
		Report		Stadium: Feethams; Attendance: 6,160

13 December 1958 22	Millwall	4–2	Port Vale	New Cross, Lewisham
		Report	Steele; Barnett	Stadium: The Den; Attendance: 11,056

20 December 1958 23	Northampton Town	2–4	Port Vale	Northampton
15:00 GMT	Fowler	Report	Poole; Kinsey; Barnett	Stadium: County Cricket Ground; Attendance: 6,907

26 December 1958 24	Port Vale	8–0	Gateshead	Burslem
	Cunliffe; Poole; Steele; Jackson (pen.); Barnett	Report		Stadium: Vale Park; Attendance: 16,899

1 January 1959 25	Gateshead	0–4	Port Vale	Gateshead
		Report	Cunliffe; Steele; Poole	Stadium: Redheugh Park; Attendance: 4,674

23 January 1959 26	Port Vale	2–1	Walsall	Burslem
	Barnett; Wilkinson	Report		Stadium: Vale Park; Attendance: 11,569

31 January 1959 27	Port Vale	4–2	Bradford (Park Avenue)	Burslem
	Wilkinson; Steele; Kinsey	Report		Stadium: Vale Park; Attendance: 12,377

7 February 1959 28	Port Vale	3–2	Aldershot	Burslem
	Barnett; Steele	Report		Stadium: Vale Park; Attendance: 10,608

14 February 1959 29	Crystal Palace	1–1	Port Vale	Selhurst, Croydon
		Report	Cunliffe	Stadium: Selhurst Park; Attendance: 13,305

21 February 1959 30	Port Vale	4–0	Chester	Burslem
	Wilkinson; Jackson; Steele; Barnett	Report		Stadium: Vale Park; Attendance: 8,851

28 February 1959 31	Oldham Athletic	0–2	Port Vale	Oldham
		Report	Barnett	Stadium: Boundary Park; Attendance: 7,515

2 March 1959 32	Port Vale	2–0	Workington	Burslem
	Poole; Kinsey	Report		Stadium: Vale Park; Attendance: 10,978

7 March 1959 33	Port Vale	4–1	Barrow	Burslem
	Wilkinson; Cunliffe; Barnett	Report		Stadium: Vale Park; Attendance: 10,034

14 March 1959 34	Carlisle United	0–3	Port Vale	Carlisle
		Report	Barnett; Steele	Stadium: Brunton Park; Attendance: 6,110

16 March 1959 35	Coventry City	1–0	Port Vale	Coventry
	Straw	Report		Stadium: Highfield Road; Attendance: 28,429

21 March 1959 36	Port Vale	3–1	Gillingham	Burslem
	Steele; Cunliffe; Barnett	Report		Stadium: Vale Park; Attendance: 11,119

27 March 1959 37	Crewe Alexandra	2–0	Port Vale	Crewe
		Report		Stadium: Gresty Road; Attendance: 15,330

28 March 1959 38	Exeter City	3–4	Port Vale	Exeter
	Rees 47'; Stiffle 60'; Calland 75'	Report	Poole 18'; Sproson 80'; Steele 43', 86'	Stadium: St James Park; Attendance: 12,088

30 March 1959 39	Port Vale	1–1	Crewe Alexandra	Burslem
	Jackson (pen.)	Report		Stadium: Vale Park; Attendance: 20,524

4 April 1959 40	Port Vale	3–0	Coventry City	Burslem
	Wilkinson; Jackson (pen.)	Report		Stadium: Vale Park; Attendance: 20,916

11 April 1959 41	Shrewsbury Town	4–3	Port Vale	Shrewsbury
		Report	Barnett; Cunliffe	Stadium: Gay Meadow; Attendance: 10,619

15 April 1959 42	York City	0–0	Port Vale	York
		Report		Stadium: Bootham Crescent; Attendance: 9,755

18 April 1959 43	Port Vale	1–1	Darlington	Burslem
	Barnett	Report		Stadium: Vale Park; Attendance: 11,577

22 April 1959 44	Torquay United	1–1	Port Vale	Torquay
		Report	Barnett	Stadium: Plainmoor; Attendance: 5,036

25 April 1959 45	Walsall	1–1	Port Vale	Walsall
		Report	Barnett	Stadium: Fellows Park; Attendance: 6,626

27 April 1959 46	Port Vale	5–2	Millwall	Burslem
19:15 BST	Barnett; Poole; Jackson; Cunliffe	Report		Stadium: Vale Park; Attendance: 13,473

=== FA Cup ===
15 November 1958 R1	Torquay United	1–0	Port Vale	Torquay
		Report		Stadium: Plainmoor; Attendance: 6,526

== Squad statistics ==
=== Appearances and goals ===
Key to positions: GK – Goalkeeper; FB – Full back; HB – Half back; FW – Forward

No.	Pos	Nat	Player	Total		Fourth Division		FA Cup	
No.	Pos	Nat	Player	Apps	Goals	Apps	Goals	Apps	Goals
	GK	(England) ENG	Ken Hancock	25	0	25	0	0	0
	GK	(Wales) WAL	Keith Jones	22	0	21	0	1	0
	FB	(England) ENG	Fred Donaldson	11	0	11	0	0	0
	FB	(England) ENG	Roy Pritchard	18	0	18	0	0	0
	FB	(England) ENG	David Raine	29	0	28	0	1	0
	FB	(England) ENG	Selwyn Whalley	11	0	11	0	0	0
	HB	(England) ENG	Albert Leake	47	0	46	0	1	0
	HB	(England) ENG	Alan Martin	16	0	16	0	0	0
	HB	(England) ENG	Terry Miles	46	0	45	0	1	0
	HB	(England) ENG	Roy Sproson	22	1	21	1	1	0
	FW	(England) ENG	Dennis Bailey	1	0	1	0	0	0
	FW	(England) ENG	Graham Barnett	22	20	22	20	0	0
	FW	(England) ENG	John Cunliffe	46	15	45	15	1	0
	FW	(England) ENG	Peter Hall	9	2	9	2	0	0
	FW	(England) ENG	Brian Jackson	38	8	37	8	1	0
	FW	(Wales) WAL	Noel Kinsey	37	3	36	3	1	0
	FW	(England) ENG	Harry Poole	36	16	35	16	1	0
	FW	(England) ENG	Stan Steele	47	22	46	22	1	0
	FW	(England) ENG	Jack Wilkinson	34	21	33	21	1	0

=== Top scorers ===
Place	Position	Nation	Name	Fourth Division	FA Cup	Total
1	FW	England	Stan Steele	22	0	22
2	FW	England	Jack Wilkinson	21	0	21
3	FW	England	Graham Barnett	20	0	20
4	FW	England	Harry Poole	16	0	16
5	FW	England	John Cunliffe	15	0	15
6	FW	England	Brian Jackson	8	0	8
7	FW	Wales	Noel Kinsey	3	0	3
8	FW	England	Peter Hall	2	0	2
9	HB	England	Roy Sproson	1	0	1
–	–	–	Own goals	2	0	2
			TOTALS	110	0	110

== Transfers ==
=== Transfers in ===
Date from	Position	Nationality	Name	From	Fee	Ref.
Summer 1958	FB	ENG	Roy Pritchard	Notts County	Free transfer	
May 1958	FW	ENG	Peter Hall	Stoke City	Free transfer	
July 1958	FW	ENG	Brian Jackson	Liverpool	£1,700	
August 1958	FW	ENG	Dennis Bailey	Bolton Wanderers	Free transfer	
November 1958	GK	ENG	Ken Hancock	Stoke City	Free transfer	

=== Transfers out ===
Date from	Position	Nationality	Name	To	Fee	Ref.
April 1959	GK	WAL	Keith Jones	Crewe Alexandra	Free transfer	
Summer 1959	HB	ENG	Alan Martin	Northwich Victoria	Released	
