= Cliff Portwood =

English footballer and singer (1937–2012)

Personal information
- Full name: Clifford Portwood
- Date of birth: 17 October 1937
- Place of birth: Salford, Greater Manchester, England
- Date of death: 10 January 2012 (aged 74)
- Place of death: Basingstoke, England
- Height: 5 ft 6 in (1.68 m)
- Positions: Winger; inside forward

Youth career
- Manchester Athletic

Senior career*
Years	Team	Apps	(Gls)
1955–1959	Preston North End	0	(0)
1959–1961	Port Vale	61	(33)
1961–1963	Grimsby Town	92	(35)
1963–1969	Portsmouth	98	(28)
- Durban United
Total		251+	(96+)
- * Club domestic league appearances and goals

Clifford Portwood (17 October 1937 – 10 January 2012) was an English footballer and later singer and television personality.

A winger and inside forward, he scored 96 goals in 252 league games in a 14-year career in the Football League. He spent 1955 to 1959 at Preston North End, without making an appearance, before he was sold to Port Vale for £750. He was sold to Grimsby Town for £6,000 in July 1961 and helped the club to win promotion out of the Third Division in 1961–62. He moved on to Portsmouth for £4,000 in 1963, where he remained for the next six years before he left the professional game to move to South Africa. He later became a successful singer and television personality in Australia.

== Playing career ==
Portwood started his career with Manchester Athletic, playing youth football with the likes of Bobby Charlton, Eddie Colman and Albert Scanlon, before joining Preston North End in February 1955 after being spotted by Frank Hill. During his time at Deepdale he was Tom Finney's understudy. However, he did not make his league debut at Preston, as new manager Cliff Britton did not see Portwood as being up to First Division standard once he returned from his national service with the Royal Air Force.

He joined Third Division Port Vale in August 1959, when manager Norman Low paid out £750 to secure his services. He scored his first senior goal against Queens Park Rangers on 5 December 1959, in a 3–3 draw in the FA Cup. He finished the 1959–60 campaign with 12 goals to his name, bagging braces in wins over Grimsby Town and Bury. He was the club's top scorer for the 1960–61 season with 26 goals, netting twice in clashes with Chelmsford City, Watford, Bristol City and Grimsby Town, and hitting a hat-trick in a 5–0 boxing day win over Tranmere Rovers in front of over 14,000 spectators at Vale Park. He was sold to Grimsby Town for £6,000 in July 1961, as the club were looking to raise £10,000 to re-sign Stan Steele from West Bromwich Albion. He had scored 38 goals in 74 games for Port Vale in league and cup competitions.

Under Tim Ward's stewardship, the "Mariners" won promotion out of the Third Division as runners-up in 1961–62, finishing three points ahead of third-placed Bournemouth & Boscombe Athletic. They retained their Second Division status by a four-point margin in 1962–63, after which new manager Tom Johnston moved Portwood on to George Smith's Portsmouth for a £4,000 fee, also in the second tier. He had scored 35 goals in 92 league games for Grimsby in two years.

Legendary striker Ron Saunders left the club in 1964 after scoring 33 goals in 1963–64. This left Portsmouth short of goals, and Portwood was the club's top scorer in the 1964–65 season with 12 goals, helping them to avoid relegation by just one point. Portwood scored a total of 30 goals in 106 league and cup games at Portsmouth. After leaving "Pompey" in 1969 he went to South Africa, playing and coaching with Durban United. Whilst in Durban, he entered a singing competition on the radio and won a recording contract in Australia.

== Style of play ==
In his later life, Portwood compared his style to that of Cristiano Ronaldo – "on the ball, twinkly-toed, turn on a sixpence, turn in the box, sharp."

== Singing career ==
Moving to Melbourne permanently in the early 1970s, he became a successful recording artist and TV personality, earning five gold records and appearing on Channel 7's The Penthouse Club most weekends. During his career, he met and performed with such people as Keith Moon, Bernard Cribbins, Tommy Cooper, Frankie Vaughan and Dick Emery. Portwood returned to England in the early 1980s, on his return he appeared on several talent shows and in 1982 recorded a World Cup song with members of the 1966 FIFA World Cup squad; "Up there oh England" was pulled due to a licensing issue on the B-side. The song was done in conjunction with his producer friend, Mike Brady, who wrote the original song "Up There Cazaly", a number one in Australia. The licensing issue was eventually resolved in time for the 2010 FIFA World Cup.

In the late 1990s, he had been going to Florida for several years and successfully singing on the cabaret circuit there in the winter months until a lung condition meant he had to return full-time to England in 2008. There, he regularly watched Portsmouth play at Fratton Park and lived in Alton, Hampshire until his death. He died of lung disease in hospital at Basingstoke on 10 January 2012, after a long illness.

== Career statistics ==
Appearances and goals by club, season and competition
Club	Season	League			FA Cup		League Cup		Total	
Club	Season	Division	Apps	Goals	Apps	Goals	Apps	Goals	Apps	Goals
Preston North End	1954–55	First Division	0	0	0	0	—		0	0
Port Vale	1959–60	Third Division	20	9	5	3	—		25	12
Port Vale	1960–61	Third Division	41	24	3	2	3	0	47	26
Port Vale	Total		61	33	8	5	3	0	72	38
Grimsby Town	1961–62	Third Division	37	14	1	1	1	0	39	15
Grimsby Town	1962–63	Second Division	27	10	1	0	0	0	28	10
Grimsby Town	1963–64	Second Division	28	11	1	0	1	0	30	11
Grimsby Town	Total		92	35	3	1	2	0	97	36
Portsmouth	1964–65	Second Division	31	11	2	0	3	1	36	12
Portsmouth	1965–66	Second Division	31	8	2	1	1	0	34	9
Portsmouth	1966–67	Second Division	23	5	0	0	0	0	23	5
Portsmouth	1967–68	Second Division	12	4	0	0	0	0	12	4
Portsmouth	1968–69	Second Division	1	0	0	0	0	0	1	0
Portsmouth	Total		98	28	4	1	4	1	106	30
Career total			251	96	15	7	9	1	275	104

== Honours ==
Grimsby Town

- Football League Third Division second-place promotion: 1961–62
