= 1959–60 Port Vale F.C. season =

Port Vale F.C.
1959–60 season
- Chairman: Fred Burgess
- Manager: Norman Low
- Stadium: Vale Park
- Football League Third Division: 14th (46 points)
- FA Cup: Fifth Round (eliminated by Aston Villa)
- Supporters' Clubs' Trophy: Runners–up (eliminated by Stoke City)
- Top goalscorer: League: Graham Barnett (14); All: Graham Barnett (17)
- Highest home attendance: 49,768 vs. Aston Villa, 20 February 1960
- Lowest home attendance: 5,514 vs. Swindon Town, 30 April 1960
- Average home league attendance: 10,733
- Biggest win: 7–0 vs. Halifax Town, 28 December 1959
- Biggest defeat: 0–6 vs. Tranmere Rovers, 5 September 1959
Home colours

The 1958–59 season was Port Vale's 48th season of football in the English Football League, and their first season in the Third Division following their promotion from the Fourth Division. Under the stewardship of manager Norman Low and chairman Fred Burgess, Vale finished a solid 14th with 46 points from 46 matches, nestled mid-table and comfortably clear of both relegation and promotion zones. The attack produced 80 league goals, with Graham Barnett finishing as both league top scorer with 14 goals and season top scorer with 17 across all competitions.

In the FA Cup, Vale enjoyed their most successful run since 1953–54, reaching the Fifth Round, a journey which came to an end in a 2–1 home defeat to Aston Villa before a club record crowd of 49,768 at Vale Park on 20 February 1960. They also took part in the inaugural Supporters' Clubs' Trophy, narrowly losing the final to Potteries derby rivals Stoke City by 5–3 on aggregate. Support at Vale Park remained steady, with an average attendance of 10,733, though spectator interest varied significantly — from a season‑low 5,514 against Swindon Town on 30 April 1960, to the spectacular 49,768 in the cup tie with Villa. One of the season's standout league results was a 7–0 thrashing of Halifax Town on Boxing Day 1959, Vale's largest win of the campaign.

The squad underwent notable changes: new signings included Morgan Hunt, Stan March, Cliff Portwood, Peter Ford, and Harry Oscroft, while departures saw Jack Wilkinson, John Cunliffe, and eventual top scorer Graham Barnett move on during the season — reflecting Low's continued reshaping of the team. Overall, the 1959–60 season was marked by a competent return to Third Division football. Vale consolidated their position with mid-table stability, a memorable FA Cup run that broke attendance records, and some emphatic league victories — laying down a foundation for further progress under Norman Low.

== Overview ==
=== Third Division ===
The pre-season saw the arrival of Morgan Hunt from Norwich City for a four-figure fee, and outside-left Cliff Portwood from Preston North End for £750.

The season began with a 3–2 win over Reading at Elm Park, Norman Low having selected a first XI without any of the new signings. However, after a 1–0 win over Bournemouth & Boscombe Athletic, Vale began to struggle, picking up just a point in their next six games. Low tried to sign Stanley Matthews, still going strong aged 44 for Blackpool, but a deal could not be reached. On 5 September, Tranmere Rovers beat Vale 6–0 at Prenton Park after Roy Sproson left the field in the first half with a gashed leg. Low then traded John Cunliffe and £2,000 to Stoke City in exchange for winger Harry Oscroft and centre-half Peter Ford. An improvement took place, and despite trouble in front of goal, the team won seven successive games at Burslem. In October, Jack Wilkinson was sold to Exeter City for £2,500, having lost his place in the starting eleven. On 28 December, Vale recorded a 7–0 win over Halifax Town, causing The Sentinel's "T.G.F." to remark that "rarely have the opposition been so completely outplayed".

In March, Graham Barnett was sold to Tranmere Rovers for £5,000, having lost his form. The "Valiants" continued to perform well at home but lost on their travels. The departure of top-scorer Barnett meant the club 'urgently needed a top-class inside-forward'. This was proven with a run of just four goals in seven matches, culminating in only two points and dashed hopes of promotion. On 12 March, Vale were beaten 4–1 at Chesterfield and both Peter Ford and Terry Miles suffered season-ending injuries. A 3–1 defeat at Bury saw Peter Ford play as the eighth different player of the season in the centre forward role. In danger of relegation, the players rallied to win seven points from the final five games. The penultimate match was a 6–3 loss to Mansfield Town at Field Mill, whilst Vale then won against Swindon Town 6–1 in a game that was alleged to have been fixed by Jimmy Gauld.

They finished in 14th spot with 46 points, a good finish for a club just promoted. Stan Steele had put in his third successive ever-present season, whilst Barnett was the top-scorer despite leaving in March. The club toured Czechoslovakia at the end of the season, due to Stoke-on-Trent's close relationship with the town of Lidice that developed from local MP Barnett Stross's Lidice Shall Live campaign. The team defeated Cottwaldov, Přerov, Karlovy Vary; drew with FK Teplice; and were beaten by Jihlava.

=== Finances ===
On the financial side, a £1,454 loss was announced despite a £10,352 donation from the Sportsmen's Association. Gate receipts had risen by £1,680 due to the Aston Villa game. However, average home attendance was down by around 2,000. Wages also increased by a more considerable £7,064, though there was a transfer credit of £3,500. There were 22 players retained, Roy Pritchard and Morgan Hunt were not amongst them, leaving for Wellington Town and Boston United respectively.

In May, the club took a five-match tour of Czechoslovakia. They experienced a culture shock, playing with a smaller, 'half-inflated' ball, and finding referees much more strict. However, the tour was a success and was much enjoyed by the players and their hosts.

=== Cup competitions ===
In the FA Cup, Vale eased past Dorchester Town of the Western League 2–1 after Graham Barnett injured Dorchester's keeper. In the next round Vale beat Queens Park Rangers 2–1 in a replay, after a 50 yards (46 m) strike from David Raine helped them to a 3–3 draw in the original match. In the third round, they met Second Division high-flyers Cardiff City at Ninian Park, and were not concerned as Graham Barnett responded to Low's warning that the Wales captain faced them by saying "So fucking what? My mother could play for Wales". They beat Cardiff 2–0 with a solid performance. Drawn against Scunthorpe United at Glanford Park, 'the defence took the honours' in a 1–0 win. The fifth round draw saw Vale face a home tie with Aston Villa, another second-tier club. A still-standing club-record attendance of 49,768 turned up for the game on 20 February, resulting in £8,500 worth of gate receipts for the Vale. Vale sold tickets for the Villa game from kiosks inside the ground during a midweek home game against Grimsby Town, which saw a 12,000 higher-than-normal attendance as fans were so desperate to secure their tickets for the Villa game. Heavy snowfall preceded the match and 1,500 tonnes of snow were cleared off the pitch. Brian Jackson gave Vale a 36th-minute lead, but the "Villans" came back to win the match with six minutes to spare.

Vale lost to Stoke 5–3 on aggregate in the Supporters' Clubs' Trophy.

== Results ==
=== Football League Third Division ===
==== League table ====
Pos	Team	Pld	W	D	L	GF	GA	GAv	Pts
12	Southend United	46	19	8	19	76	74	1.027	46
13	Newport County	46	20	6	20	80	79	1.013	46
14	Port Vale	46	19	8	19	80	79	1.013	46
15	Halifax Town	46	18	10	18	70	72	0.972	46
16	Swindon Town	46	19	8	19	69	78	0.885	46

==== Results by matchday ====
Round	1	2	3	4	5	6	7	8	9	10	11	12	13	14	15	16	17	18	19	20	21	22	23	24	25	26	27	28	29	30	31	32	33	34	35	36	37	38	39	40	41	42	43	44	45	46
Ground	A	H	H	A	A	H	A	A	H	H	A	A	H	H	H	A	H	A	H	H	A	A	H	A	H	A	H	H	A	H	H	A	A	H	A	A	H	A	H	A	A	H	H	A	A	H
Result	W	W	L	L	L	D	L	L	W	W	L	L	W	W	W	L	W	L	W	L	D	W	W	D	W	L	D	W	L	W	D	L	W	W	D	L	D	L	L	L	L	W	W	D	L	W
Position	9	2	8	15	17	16	18	19	17	16	17	18	18	16	16	16	16	16	15	16	16	14	13	12	9	10	11	10	12	10	11	11	10	7	7	9	11	12	13	16	17	14	11	14	15	14
Points	2	4	4	4	4	5	5	5	7	9	9	9	11	13	15	15	17	17	19	19	20	22	24	25	27	27	28	30	30	32	33	33	35	37	38	38	39	39	39	39	39	41	43	44	44	46

Source: Statto
A = Away; H = Home; W = Win; D = Draw; L = Loss

==== Matches ====
22 August 1959 1	Reading	2–3	Port Vale	Reading, Berkshire
		Report	Barnett; Poole	Stadium: Elm Park; Attendance: 14,917

24 August 1959 2	Port Vale	1–0	Bournemouth & Boscombe Athletic	Burslem
	Barnett	Report		Stadium: Vale Park; Attendance: 18,037

29 August 1959 3	Port Vale	0–3	Shrewsbury Town	Burslem
		Report		Stadium: Vale Park; Attendance: 18,607

2 September 1959 4	Bournemouth & Boscombe Athletic	3–0	Port Vale	Bournemouth
		Report		Stadium: Dean Court; Attendance: 11,689

5 September 1959 5	Tranmere Rovers	6–0	Port Vale	Prenton
		Report		Stadium: Prenton Park; Attendance: 11,635

7 September 1959 6	Port Vale	1–1	Southampton	Burslem
	Poole	Report	O'Brien	Stadium: Vale Park; Attendance: 13,906

12 September 1959 7	Norwich City	5–1	Port Vale	Norwich
		Report	Poole	Stadium: Carrow Road; Attendance: 27,041

16 September 1959 8	Southampton	3–2	Port Vale	Southampton
	Huxford; Reeves	Report	Barnett; Steele	Stadium: The Dell; Attendance: 17,009

19 September 1959 9	Port Vale	3–1	Brentford	Burslem
	Steele; Barnett	Report	Francis	Stadium: Vale Park; Attendance: 12,817

21 September 1959 10	Port Vale	1–0	Barnsley	Burslem
	Sproson	Report		Stadium: Vale Park; Attendance: 10,886

26 September 1959 11	Colchester United	3–1	Port Vale	Colchester
	King	Report	Poole	Stadium: Layer Road; Attendance: 7,822

30 September 1959 12	Barnsley	1–0	Port Vale	Barnsley
		Report		Stadium: Oakwell; Attendance: 7,870

3 October 1959 13	Port Vale	3–1	Southend United	Burslem
	Leake; Steele; Jackson	Report		Stadium: Vale Park; Attendance: 12,008

10 October 1959 14	Port Vale	2–0	Accrington Stanley	Burslem
	Jackson (pen.); Barnett	Report		Stadium: Vale Park; Attendance: 10,712

12 October 1959 15	Port Vale	4–1	Mansfield Town	Burslem
	Jackson; Oscroft; Barnett; Wilkinson	Report	Jones	Stadium: Vale Park; Attendance: 9,230

19 October 1959 16	Newport County	4–3	Port Vale	Newport, Wales
	McPherson; Meyer; McSeveney	Report	Whalley; Barnett	Stadium: Somerton Park; Attendance: 7,996

24 October 1959 17	Port Vale	3–1	Chesterfield	Burslem
	Oscroft; Barnett; Steele	Report		Stadium: Vale Park; Attendance: 7,946

31 October 1959 18	Wrexham	1–0	Port Vale	Wrexham
15:15 GMT	Weston 78'	Report		Stadium: Racecourse Ground; Attendance: 8,150; Referee: G. McCabe; Assistant referees: H. Tonge, T.B. Edwards

7 November 1959 19	Port Vale	2–0	York City	Burslem
	Oscroft (og.)	Report		Stadium: Vale Park; Attendance: 8,425

21 November 1959 20	Port Vale	0–2	Bradford City	Burslem
		Report		Stadium: Vale Park; Attendance: 9,924

28 November 1959 21	Queens Park Rangers	2–2	Port Vale	Shepherd's Bush, West London
	Bedford	Report	Poole	Stadium: Loftus Road; Attendance: 8,775

12 December 1959 22	Swindon Town	2–3	Port Vale	Swindon
	Layne 15'; Marshall 59'	Report	Barnett 13'; Jackson 40'; Portwood 83'	Stadium: County Ground; Attendance: 7,716; Referee: C.W. Kingston

19 December 1959 23	Port Vale	4–1	Reading	Burslem
	Poole; Jackson; Portwood	Report		Stadium: Vale Park; Attendance: 6,723

26 December 1959 24	Halifax Town	1–1	Port Vale	Halifax, West Yorkshire
		Report	Steele	Stadium: The Shay; Attendance: 6,175

28 December 1959 25	Port Vale	7–0	Halifax Town	Burslem
	Barnett; Jackson; Poole	Report		Stadium: Vale Park; Attendance: 9,664

2 January 1960 26	Shrewsbury Town	2–1	Port Vale	Shrewsbury
		Report	Steele	Stadium: Gay Meadow; Attendance: 9,754

16 January 1960 27	Port Vale	1–1	Tranmere Rovers	Burslem
	Poole	Report		Stadium: Vale Park; Attendance: 9,706

23 January 1960 28	Port Vale	2–1	Norwich City	Burslem
	Steele; Miles	Report		Stadium: Vale Park; Attendance: 11,040

6 February 1960 29	Brentford	2–0	Port Vale	Brentford
	Towers; Francis	Report		Stadium: Griffin Park; Attendance: 10,141

10 February 1960 30	Port Vale	2–1	Grimsby Town	Burslem
	Portwood	Report		Stadium: Vale Park; Attendance: 22,987

13 February 1960 31	Port Vale	1–1	Colchester United	Burslem
	Donaldson	Report	King	Stadium: Vale Park; Attendance: 10,248

22 February 1960 32	Southend United	2–1	Port Vale	Southend-on-Sea
		Report	Steele	Stadium: Roots Hall; Attendance: 6,534

27 February 1960 33	Accrington Stanley	1–3	Port Vale	Accrington
		Report	Donaldson; Steele	Stadium: Peel Park; Attendance: 3,109

5 March 1960 34	Port Vale	2–1	Newport County	Burslem
	Donaldson; Jackson	Report	McSeveney	Stadium: Vale Park; Attendance: 9,073

7 March 1960 35	Coventry City	1–1	Port Vale	Coventry
	Simcoe (og.)	Report	Leake	Stadium: Highfield Road; Attendance: 15,549

12 March 1960 36	Chesterfield	4–1	Port Vale	Chesterfield, Derbyshire
		Report	(og.)	Stadium: Saltergate; Attendance: 6,152

19 March 1960 37	Port Vale	0–0	Queens Park Rangers	Burslem
		Report		Stadium: Vale Park; Attendance: 7,049

26 March 1960 38	York City	2–0	Port Vale	York
		Report		Stadium: Bootham Crescent; Attendance: 6,415

2 April 1960 39	Port Vale	0–1	Coventry City	Burslem
		Report		Stadium: Vale Park; Attendance: 7,686

9 April 1960 40	Bradford City	3–1	Port Vale	Bradford
		Report	Poole	Stadium: Valley Parade; Attendance: 5,986

15 April 1960 41	Bury	3–1	Port Vale	Bury, Greater Manchester
		Report	Hall	Stadium: Gigg Lane; Attendance: 6,397

16 April 1960 42	Port Vale	3–1	Wrexham	Burslem
15:15 BST	Portwood 31'; Archer 60', 87'	Report	Harbertson 58'	Stadium: Vale Park; Attendance: 6,798; Referee: H.P. Hackney

18 April 1960 43	Port Vale	3–0	Bury	Burslem
	Portwood; Poole	Report		Stadium: Vale Park; Attendance: 7,875

23 April 1960 44	Grimsby Town	1–1	Port Vale	Cleethorpes
		Report	Hall	Stadium: Blundell Park; Attendance: 8,413

25 April 1960 45	Mansfield Town	6–3	Port Vale	Mansfield
	Hollett; Delapenha; Fitzsimons; Wragg	Report	Portwood; Archer; Kinsey	Stadium: Field Mill; Attendance: 4,970

30 April 1960 46	Port Vale	6–1	Swindon Town	Burslem
	Oscroft 14', 25', 30', 65'; Chamberlin 27' (og.); Portwood 60'	Report	Gauld 87'	Stadium: Vale Park; Attendance: 5,514; Referee: L.J. Hamer

=== FA Cup ===
14 November 1959 R1	Dorchester Town	1–2	Port Vale	Dorchester, Dorset
		Report	Poole; Barnett	Attendance: 4,100

5 December 1959 R2	Queens Park Rangers	3–3	Port Vale	Shepherd's Bush, West London
	Longbottom; Bedford	Report	Portwood; Leake; Raine	Stadium: Loftus Road; Attendance: 11,143

7 December 1959 Replay	Port Vale	2–1	Queens Park Rangers	Burslem
	Barnett	Report	Andrews	Stadium: Vale Park; Attendance: 9,544

9 January 1960 R3	Cardiff City	0–2	Port Vale	Cardiff
14:15 GMT		Report	Steele; Portwood	Stadium: Ninian Park; Attendance: 25,588; Referee: George McCabe

30 January 1960 R4	Scunthorpe United	0–1	Port Vale	Scunthorpe
		Report	Portwood	Stadium: Old Show Ground; Attendance: 14,043

20 February 1960 R5	Port Vale	1–2	Aston Villa	Burslem
	Jackson 36' (pen.)	Report	Hitchens 58'; Thomson 84'	Stadium: Vale Park; Attendance: 49,768; Referee: Tommy Langdale

=== Supporters' Clubs' Trophy ===
5 October 1959 Final 1st Leg	Stoke City	3–1	Port Vale	Stoke-upon-Trent
			Jackson	Stadium: Victoria Ground; Attendance: 9,045

26 October 1959 Final 2nd Leg	Port Vale	2–2 (3–5 agg.)	Stoke City	Burslem
	Steele; Jackson			Stadium: Vale Park; Attendance: 7,506

== Squad statistics ==
=== Appearances and goals ===
Key to positions: GK – Goalkeeper; FB – Full back; HB – Half back; FW – Forward

No.	Pos	Nat	Player	Total		Third Division		FA Cup		Supporters' Club's Trophy	
No.	Pos	Nat	Player	Apps	Goals	Apps	Goals	Apps	Goals	Apps	Goals
	GK	(England) ENG	Ken Hancock	26	0	23	0	1	0	2	0
	GK	(England) ENG	John Poole	28	0	23	0	5	0	0	0
	FB	(England) ENG	Fred Donaldson	8	4	8	4	0	0	0	0
	FB	(England) ENG	Roy Pritchard	6	0	6	0	0	0	0	0
	FB	(England) ENG	David Raine	47	1	39	0	6	1	2	0
	FB	(England) ENG	Selwyn Whalley	13	2	12	2	0	0	1	0
	HB	(England) ENG	Colin Davies	10	0	10	0	0	0	0	0
	HB	(England) ENG	Peter Ford	33	0	25	0	6	0	2	0
	HB	(Wales) WAL	Morgan Hunt	2	0	2	0	0	0	0	0
	HB	(England) ENG	Albert Leake	39	3	33	2	5	1	1	0
	HB	(England) ENG	Terry Miles	41	1	34	1	6	0	1	0
	HB	(England) ENG	Roy Sproson	49	1	41	1	6	0	2	0
	FW	(England) ENG	John Archer	6	3	6	3	0	0	0	0
	FW	(England) ENG	Peter Hall	4	2	4	2	0	0	0	0
	FW	(England) ENG	Brian Jackson	53	11	45	8	6	1	2	2
	FW	(Wales) WAL	Noel Kinsey	21	1	19	1	1	0	1	0
	FW	(England) ENG	Stan March	2	0	1	0	0	0	1	0
	FW	(England) ENG	Harry Oscroft	29	7	26	7	1	0	2	0
	FW	(England) ENG	Harry Poole	52	13	44	12	6	1	2	0
	FW	(England) ENG	Cliff Portwood	25	12	20	9	5	3	0	0
	FW	(England) ENG	Stan Steele	54	12	46	10	6	1	2	1
Players who featured but departed the club during the season:
	FW	(England) ENG	Graham Barnett	35	17	27	14	6	3	2	0
	FW	(England) ENG	John Cunliffe	6	0	6	0	0	0	0	0
	FW	(England) ENG	Jack Wilkinson	6	1	6	1	0	0	0	0

=== Top scorers ===
Place	Position	Nation	Name	Third Division	FA Cup	Other	Total
1	FW	England	Graham Barnett	14	3	0	17
2	FW	England	Harry Poole	12	1	0	13
3	FW	England	Cliff Portwood	9	3	0	12
4	FW	England	Stan Steele	10	1	1	11
–	MF	England	Brian Jackson	8	1	2	11
6	FW	England	Harry Oscroft	7	0	0	7
7	FB	England	Fred Donaldson	4	0	0	4
8	FW	England	John Archer	3	0	0	3
–	HB	England	Albert Leake	2	1	0	3
10	FW	England	Peter Hall	2	0	0	2
–	FB	England	Selwyn Whalley	2	0	0	2
11	FW	England	Jack Wilkinson	1	0	0	1
–	FW	Wales	Noel Kinsey	1	0	0	1
–	HB	England	Roy Sproson	1	0	0	1
–	HB	England	Terry Miles	1	0	0	1
–	FB	England	David Raine	0	1	0	1
–	–	–	Own goals	3	0	0	3
			TOTALS	80	11	3	94

== Transfers ==
=== Transfers in ===
Date from	Position	Nationality	Name	From	Fee	Ref.
July 1959	HB	WAL	Morgan Hunt	Norwich City	'four figure fee'	
August 1959	FW	ENG	Stan March	Altrincham	£250	
August 1959	FW	ENG	Cliff Portwood	Preston North End	£750	
September 1959	HB	ENG	Peter Ford	Stoke City	Exchange	
September 1959	FW	ENG	Harry Oscroft	Stoke City	Exchange	

=== Transfers out ===
Date from	Position	Nationality	Name	To	Fee	Ref.
September 1959	FW	ENG	John Cunliffe	Stoke City	Exchange	
October 1959	FW	ENG	Jack Wilkinson	Exeter City	£2,500	
March 1960	FW	ENG	Graham Barnett	Tranmere Rovers	£5,000	
May 1960	FB	ENG	Jimmy Adams	Crewe Alexandra	Free transfer	
May 1960	FB	ENG	Roy Pritchard	Wellington Town	Free transfer	
August 1960	FB	ENG	Fred Donaldson	Exeter City	£2,000	
Summer 1960	HB	WAL	Morgan Hunt	Boston United	Released	
Summer 1960	FW	SCO	Jimmy McLean	Wellington Town	Released	
