= Ken Hancock =

English footballer (1937–2025)

Personal information
- Full name: Kenneth Paul Hancock
- Date of birth: 25 November 1937
- Place of birth: Milton, Stoke-on-Trent, England
- Date of death: 27 April 2025 (aged 87)
- Height: 6 ft 1 in (1.85 m)
- Position: Goalkeeper

Youth career
- 1953–1958: Stoke City

Senior career*
Years	Team	Apps	(Gls)
1958–1964	Port Vale	241	(0)
1964–1969	Ipswich Town	163	(0)
1969–1971	Tottenham Hotspur	3	(0)
1971–1973	Bury	35	(0)
1973–1974	Stafford Rangers		
1974–1975	Northwich Victoria		
Total		442	(0)

Managerial career
- 1978–1979: Leek Town
- * Club domestic league appearances and goals

Kenneth Paul Hancock (25 November 1937 – 27 April 2025) was an English footballer who played as a goalkeeper. He was the younger brother of Ray Hancock, who also played as a goalkeeper.

Hancock made 442 league appearances in a 15-year career in the Football League. He began his professional career at Port Vale in December 1958. He helped the club to win the Fourth Division title in 1958–59 and remained the club's first-choice goalkeeper until he was sold to Ipswich Town for a £10,000 fee in December 1964. He kept goal as the club won the Second Division title in 1967–68. He was sold to Tottenham Hotspur for £7,000 in March 1969. He moved on to Bury in July 1971 and later played Northern Premier League football for Stafford Rangers and Northwich Victoria. He later briefly managed non-League club Leek Town.

== Early life ==
Kenneth Paul Hancock was born on 25 November 1937 in Milton, and grew up in Abbey Hulton, both areas in the city of Stoke-on-Trent. He spent his youth with Stoke City before he was let go after being judged as too small by assistant manager Arthur Turner. His father, Charlie, had played as a goalkeeper in local non-League football. His elder brother, Ray, played as a goalkeeper for Stoke's Potteries derby rivals Port Vale. Hancock took a job as a bicycle courier for the city council and served his National Service with the North Staffordshire Regiment. By 1958, he had grown to a height of 6 ft 1 in (1.85 m).

== Playing career ==
=== Port Vale ===
Hancock joined Port Vale as an amateur in November 1958 after being approached by Lol Hamlett; he signed as a professional with the "Valiants" the next month. He made his debut in a 4–2 defeat by Millwall at The Den on 13 December. He played the remaining 24 games of the 1958–59 season, as manager Norman Low took the club to the Fourth Division title. Hancock lost his first-team place in November 1959 due to injury but managed to regain it off reserve goalkeeper John Poole by April 1960. The pair each played 23 Third Division games in the 1959–60 season. He did, however, miss the FA Cup tie with Aston Villa in front of a Vale Park record crowd of 49,768 due to injury.

Hancock went on to keep goal 47 times in the 1960–61 campaign, fending off competition from both Poole and John Cooke. This tally included a clean sheet at Roker Park against a Sunderland front-line led by Brian Clough in the FA Cup; before the match kicked off Hancock had been so overwhelmed by the wall of noise from the 'Roker Roar' that he fell over, though managed to style it out by doing a forward roll. He injured his ankle in the opening minutes of the replay, but with no substitutions allowed, managed to play on with the help of painkilling injections in what ended as a 3–1 victory. This win led to an FA cup fifth round defeat at Fulham.

He was an ever-present during the 51 game 1962–63 season, as Vale finished one place and four points shy of the promotion places under new boss Freddie Steele. Hancock played 50 games in the 1963–64 campaign, with Cooke deputising on two occasions. He played in the FA Cup games with Liverpool, where he kept a clean sheet at Anfield before the Vale lost the replay at home. He made 22 appearances in the 1963–64 season, but faced pressure from new signing Reg Davies.

=== Ipswich Town ===
Hancock was sold to Bill McGarry's Ipswich Town for a £10,000 fee in December 1964. Port Vale had also accepted a bid from Manchester United, though Hancock had already signed with Ipswich before being informed that Matt Busby was trying to contact to him. He conceded four goals on his debut at Preston North End, much to McGarry's annoyance. He made 20 Second Division appearances in the 1964–65 season. He played 48 games for the "Blues" in 1965–66 and 1966–67. He featured 45 times in 1967–68, as the Portman Road club won the Second Division title. He played 18 First Division games in 1968–69, before new manager Bobby Robson sold him on to league rivals Tottenham Hotspur for £7,000 in March 1969. Hancock had found McGarry to be knowledgeable, though "hard to like", but felt Robson "was disrespectful and didn't understand goalkeeping".

=== Tottenham Hotspur ===
Hancock played just six league and cup games for Bill Nicholson's "Spurs" in 1969–70 and 1970–71. He worked as Pat Jennings's deputy whilst Barry Daines and Terry Lee were still learning the game. He played one North London derby game against Arsenal at Highbury, keeping three clean sheets in his six games in all competitions. He left White Hart Lane and moved on to Bury in July 1971.

=== Later career ===
Hancock was signed as a replacement for Neil Ramsbottom, though he would soon lose his first-team place to John Forrest. He played 35 Fourth Division games for the "Shakers" in 1971–72 and 1972–73 under the stewardship of Allan Brown and then Tom McAnearney. He then left Gigg Lane and later played Northern Premier League football for Stafford Rangers and Northwich Victoria. Former teammate Roy Sproson tried to bring him back to Port Vale, though no comeback was forthcoming as Hancock had already received his provident fund payout and could not re-sign for a Football League club.

== Coaching career ==
After retiring as a player, he returned to Port Vale in July 1975 as a part-time coach under the management of Roy Sproson. He moved on to Cheshire County League side Leek Town as a manager in 1978, later serving as club chairman. He also sat on the Leek and Moorland League management committee. He co-founded Port Vale's Ex-Players Association with former teammate John Poole.

== Style of play ==
Former teammate Roy Sproson described him as: "strong in dealing with crosses, quick reactions and a fine kicker of the ball". He went on to describe a save in an FA Cup tie with Sunderland as one where "[he] turned in mid-air and managed to push the ball round the post in what still rates as the most fantastic save I have seen to this day." He could also drop-kick the ball into the opposition penalty area.

== Later life and death ==
Hancock returned to North Staffordshire after his playing career ended. He worked in the building and textile industries, in maintenance, and as a television extra. He was a passionate fan of the opera, photography, painting, bird-watching, natural history and the guitar. He was diagnosed with dementia in 2016.

Hancock died on 27 April 2025, at the age of 87. He was survived by his wife of 64 years, Julia, as well as son Paul and daughter Shelby.

== Career statistics ==
Appearances and goals by club, season and competition
Club	Season	League			FA Cup		League Cup		Total	
Club	Season	Division	Apps	Goals	Apps	Goals	Apps	Goals	Apps	Goals
Port Vale	1958–59	Fourth Division	25	0	0	0	—		25	0
Port Vale	1959–60	Third Division	23	0	1	0	—		24	0
Port Vale	1960–61	Third Division	39	0	3	0	3	0	45	0
Port Vale	1961–62	Third Division	44	0	7	0	1	0	52	0
Port Vale	1962–63	Third Division	46	0	4	0	1	0	51	0
Port Vale	1963–64	Third Division	44	0	5	0	1	0	50	0
Port Vale	1964–65	Third Division	20	0	1	0	1	0	22	0
Port Vale	Total		241	0	21	0	7	0	269	0
Ipswich Town	1964–65	Second Division	20	0	0	0	0	0	20	0
Ipswich Town	1965–66	Second Division	41	0	2	0	5	0	48	0
Ipswich Town	1966–67	Second Division	42	0	4	0	2	0	48	0
Ipswich Town	1967–68	Second Division	42	0	1	0	2	0	45	0
Ipswich Town	1968–69	First Division	18	0	0	0	1	0	19	0
Ipswich Town	Total		163	0	7	0	10	0	180	0
Tottenham Hotspur	1969–70	First Division	1	0	0	0	0	0	1	0
Tottenham Hotspur	1970–71	First Division	2	0	0	0	3	0	5	0
Tottenham Hotspur	Total		3	0	0	0	3	0	6	0
Bury	1971–72	Fourth Division	24	0	4	0	1	0	29	0
Bury	1972–73	Fourth Division	11	0	0	0	0	0	11	0
Bury	Total		35	0	4	0	1	0	40	0
Career total			442	0	32	0	21	0	495	0

== Honours ==
Port Vale

- Football League Fourth Division: 1958–59

Ipswich Town

- Football League Second Division: 1967–68
