= Morgan Hunt =

Welsh footballer

Personal information
- Full name: Morgan Marshall Hunt
- Date of birth: 5 March 1931
- Place of birth: Llantrisant, Wales
- Date of death: February 2012 (aged 80)
- Place of death: Doncaster, South Yorkshire, England
- Height: 6 ft 0 in (1.83 m)
- Position: Half-back

Youth career
- Askern Youth Club
- Askern Welfare

Senior career*
Years	Team	Apps	(Gls)
1953–1958	Doncaster Rovers	50	(2)
1958–1959	Norwich City	7	(0)
1959–1960	Port Vale	2	(0)
1960–1961	Boston United	21	(2)
- Askern Welfare
Total		80+	(4+)

Managerial career
- Askern Welfare
- 1979–1980: Doncaster Rovers Belles
- * Club domestic league appearances and goals

Morgan Marshall Hunt (5 March 1931 – February 2012) was a Welsh footballer who played as a half-back. He played for Doncaster Rovers and later managed the club's ladies team.

== Career ==
Hunt played for Askern Welfare before joining Peter Doherty's Doncaster Rovers in 1953. The club finished 12th in the Second Division in 1953–54. The Belle Vue club finished 18th in 1954–55, 17th in 1955–56, and 14th in 1956–57, before suffering relegation in last place in 1957–58. He spent the 1958–59 campaign at Norwich City, playing seven games as the "Canaries" finished two places and four points off the Third Division promotion places. He joined Norman Low's Port Vale for a four-figure fee in July 1959. Despite the money spent acquiring him, he only played two Third Division games for the club before being released at the end of the season. He later played for Boston United in the Southern League before returning to his old club Askern Welfare as the player-manager. Hunt went on to manage Doncaster Rovers Belles L.F.C. for the 1979–80 season.

== Career statistics ==
Appearances and goals by club, season and competition
Club	Season	League			FA Cup		Total	
Club	Season	Division	Apps	Goals	Apps	Goals	Apps	Goals
Doncaster Rovers	1953–54	Second Division	5	0	0	0	5	0
Doncaster Rovers	1954–55	Second Division	16	0	5	0	21	0
Doncaster Rovers	1955–56	Second Division	11	0	0	0	11	0
Doncaster Rovers	1956–57	Second Division	12	1	0	0	12	1
Doncaster Rovers	1957–58	Second Division	6	1	0	0	6	1
Doncaster Rovers	Total		50	2	5	0	55	2
Norwich City	1958–59	Third Division	7	0	1	0	8	0
Port Vale	1959–60	Third Division	2	0	0	0	2	0
Boston United	1960–61	Southern League; Premier Division	21	2	2	0	23	2
