= Harry Poole =

English footballer (1935–2023)

Personal information
- Full name: Henry Poole
- Date of birth: 31 January 1935
- Place of birth: Stoke-on-Trent, England
- Date of death: 25 September 2023 (aged 88)
- Height: 5 ft 9 in (1.75 m)
- Positions: Half back; forward

Youth career
- Carmountside Youth Club
- Milton Youth Club
- National Association of Boys' Clubs

Senior career*
Years	Team	Apps	(Gls)
1953–1968	Port Vale	451	(73)
1968–1969	Sandbach Ramblers		
- * Club domestic league appearances and goals

Henry Poole (31 January 1935 – 25 September 2023) was an English professional footballer noted for his swerving free kicks. Primarily a half back, he had the third highest number of appearances for Port Vale. He made 499 league and cup appearances for the club in a 15-year association from 1953 to 1968. Whilst Poole was at the club, the "Valiants" won the Fourth Division title in 1958–59.

== Career ==
Born in Stoke-on-Trent, Poole attended Carmountside Secondary Modern alongside Terry Miles. Poole was slightly older, though the two would be teammates from their early teens into their 30s. After spending his youth with various clubs, Poole signed for Port Vale as an amateur in February 1953. He also appeared for Oxford City whilst on national service.

Poole signed professional forms with the Vale in April 1956, making his debut in a Second Division win against Middlesbrough on 28 April 1956. By 1956–57 he was a first-team regular, playing 32 games, scoring his first goal for the club at Huddersfield Town on 17 November. However, the club started poorly and were relegated under Freddie Steele, though Poole was described as 'one of the few rays of sunlight in an otherwise gloomy beginning'. He played 44 games in 1957–58, as the club finished 15th in the Third Division South, and so were invited to form the Fourth Division.

Under the stewardship of Norman Low, the "Valiants" won the Fourth Division in 1958–59, and Poole added 'flexibility and fluidity' in his 36 appearances. He also scored 16 of Vale's record 110 goals in the league. He posted 52 appearances in 1959–60, as Vale settled in well in the Third Division. The performances he gave in his 54 games of the 1960–61 season led The Sentinel's Jon Abberley to describe Poole as 'one of the best wing-halves ever produced in the Potteries'. He remained a key fixture throughout 1961–62, posting 45 appearances, and scored in a 3–1 win over Sunderland in an FA Cup fourth round replay. He played another 47 games in 1962–63, retaining his first-team place under returning manager Freddie Steele.

Poole was limited to 29 games in 1963–64, but returned to usual service with a 39-game season in 1964–65, as the club were relegated to the Fourth Division. He was a vital player for new manager Jackie Mudie in 1965–66, playing a total of 51 games. He then posted 34 appearances in 1966–67, before playing 35 games for Stanley Matthews in 1967–68. He was given a testimonial match, shared with Terry Miles, in August 1967. At the end of the campaign both he and Miles were given free transfers to local non-League club Sandbach Ramblers. In all, he made 499 professional appearances for Port Vale (behind only Phil Sproson and Roy Sproson in terms of most appearances for the club), scoring 79 goals. Ramblers finished third-from-bottom in their debut season in the Cheshire County League, and Poole retired at the end of the 1968–69 campaign to spend more time on his business.

== Style of play ==
Former teammate Roy Sproson said: "I always thought that as a wing-half he was a waste. He possessed two good feet, great ball control, always found space, was quick and could finish. He also used to specialise in bending the ball round the defensive wall from free-kicks long before they became fashion."

During his career Bolton Wanderers considered him as a replacement for Nat Lofthouse, and Tottenham Hotspur had a bid rejected by the Vale.

== Later life and death ==
Poole was a season ticket holder at Vale Park for 50 years after retiring as a player. He married Gill and had children Matthew and Mandy and grandchildren Sam, William, Lily and Laura. Poole died on 25 September 2023.

== Career statistics ==
Appearances and goals by club, season and competition
Club	Season	League			FA Cup		League Cup		Supporters' Clubs' Trophy		Total	
Club	Season	Division	Apps	Goals	Apps	Goals	Apps	Goals	Apps	Goals	Apps	Goals
Port Vale	1953–54	Third Division North	0	0	0	0	0	0	—		0	0
Port Vale	1954–55	Second Division	0	0	0	0	0	0	—		0	0
Port Vale	1955–56	Second Division	1	0	0	0	0	0	—		1	0
Port Vale	1956–57	Second Division	30	3	2	2	0	0	—		32	5
Port Vale	1957–58	Third Division South	41	14	3	2	0	0	—		44	16
Port Vale	1958–59	Fourth Division	35	16	1	0	0	0	—		36	16
Port Vale	1959–60	Third Division	44	12	6	1	0	0	2	0	52	13
Port Vale	1960–61	Third Division	45	7	3	0	3	0	3	0	54	7
Port Vale	1961–62	Third Division	39	6	5	1	1	0	—		45	7
Port Vale	1962–63	Third Division	43	3	4	0	0	0	—		47	3
Port Vale	1963–64	Third Division	26	3	2	0	1	0	—		29	3
Port Vale	1964–65	Third Division	37	3	1	0	1	0	—		39	3
Port Vale	1965–66	Fourth Division	46	2	4	0	1	0	—		51	2
Port Vale	1966–67	Fourth Division	32	1	1	0	1	0	—		34	1
Port Vale	1967–68	Fourth Division	32	3	1	0	2	0	—		35	3
Total			451	73	33	6	10	0	5	0	499	79

== Honours ==
Port Vale

- Football League Fourth Division: 1958–59

Individual

- Port Vale F.C. Hall of Fame: inducted 2026 (inaugural)
