= Stan March =

English footballer

Personal information
- Full name: Stanley March
- Date of birth: 26 December 1938 (age 87)
- Place of birth: Manchester, England
- Position: Inside forward

Youth career
- Altrincham

Senior career*
Years	Team	Apps	(Gls)
1959–1962	Port Vale	1	(0)
1962–1963	Macclesfield	10	(4)
- Mossley
- Stafford Rangers
- * Club domestic league appearances and goals

Stanley March (born 26 December 1938) is an English former footballer.

== Career ==
March played for Altrincham before joining Port Vale for £250 in August 1959. He appeared as a substitute in the first leg of the Supporters' Clubs' Trophy final on 5 October 1959, Vale lost 3–1. He made his full debut in the league on 19 March 1960, a goalless home draw with Queen's Park Rangers. He was not selected again and was released at the end of the 1961–62 season, moving on to Macclesfield, Mossley and Stafford Rangers.

== Career statistics ==
Appearances and goals by club, season and competition
Club	Season	League			FA Cup		Other		Total	
Club	Season	Division	Apps	Goals	Apps	Goals	Apps	Goals	Apps	Goals
Port Vale	1959–60	Third Division	1	0	0	0	—		1	0
Macclesfield	1962–63	Cheshire County League	10	4	1	1	2	2	13	7
