= David Raine =

English footballer

Personal information
- Full name: David Raine
- Date of birth: 28 March 1937 (age 89)
- Place of birth: Darlington, England
- Position: Full-back

Youth career
- Port Vale

Senior career*
Years	Team	Apps	(Gls)
1957–1962	Port Vale	144	(0)
1962–1965	Doncaster Rovers	107	(2)
1965–1967	Colchester United	48	(0)
- Burton Albion
Total		299+	(2+)
- * Club domestic league appearances and goals

David Raine (born 28 March 1937) is an English former footballer who played as a full-back for Port Vale, Doncaster Rovers, Colchester United, and Burton Albion. He made 299 league appearances in a ten-year career in the English Football League, won the Fourth Division title with Port Vale in 1958–59, and was also promoted out of the Fourth Division with Colchester United in 1965–66.

== Career ==
Raine graduated through the Port Vale juniors to make his debut at Vale Park in a 2–1 win over Rotherham United on 27 April 1957. He signed his first professional contract the following month, at the end of the 1956–57 season, after the "Valiants" were relegated out of the Second Division. He established himself in Norman Low's first-team in the 1957–58 season, featuring in 31 Third Division South and three FA Cup games. He played in every game from November 1958 to the close of the 1958–59 season, as Vale won the Fourth Division title. He made 47 appearances in the 1959–60 season and scored his first senior goal on 5 December, in a 3–3 draw with Queens Park Rangers in an FA Cup second-round match at Loftus Road. He played 46 league and cup appearances in the 1960–61 campaign, missing just eight Third Division games. However, he then fell out of favour at Vale Park and played just seven league and five FA Cup games in the 1961–62 season.

Raine was sold to Oscar Hold's Doncaster Rovers for a £2,000 fee in July 1962. Fourth Division "Donny" finished 16th in 1962–63 and 14th in 1963–64, before new boss Bill Leivers took them up to ninth place in 1964–65. In his three seasons at Belle Vue, Raine scored two goals in 126 league and cup appearances. He joined Neil Franklin's Colchester United on a free transfer in June 1965. He played 25 league and cup games in the 1965–66 season, as the "U's" won promotion out of the Fourth Division. He featured 27 times in the 1966–67 campaign, before leaving Layer Road on a free transfer to Southern League club Burton Albion in April 1967.

== Career statistics ==
Appearances and goals by club, season and competition
Club	Season	League			FA Cup		League Cup		Total	
Club	Season	Division	Apps	Goals	Apps	Goals	Apps	Goals	Apps	Goals
Port Vale	1956–57	Second Division	1	0	0	0	—		1	0
Port Vale	1957–58	Third Division South	31	0	3	0	—		34	0
Port Vale	1958–59	Fourth Division	28	0	1	0	—		29	0
Port Vale	1959–60	Third Division	39	0	6	1	—		45	1
Port Vale	1960–61	Third Division	38	0	3	0	3	0	44	0
Port Vale	1961–62	Third Division	7	0	5	0	0	0	12	0
Port Vale	Total		144	0	18	1	3	0	165	1
Doncaster Rovers	1962–63	Fourth Division	44	0	3	0	3	0	50	0
Doncaster Rovers	1963–64	Fourth Division	39	2	5	0	2	0	46	2
Doncaster Rovers	1964–65	Fourth Division	24	0	3	0	3	0	30	0
Doncaster Rovers	Total		107	2	11	0	8	0	126	2
Colchester United	1965–66	Fourth Division	22	0	2	0	1	0	25	0
Colchester United	1966–67	Third Division	26	0	1	0	0	0	27	0
Colchester United	Total		48	0	3	0	1	0	52	0
Career total			299	2	32	1	12	0	343	3

== Honours ==
Port Vale

- Football League Fourth Division: 1958–59

Colchester United

- Football League Fourth Division fourth-place promotion: 1965–66
