= Peter Hall (footballer, born 1939) =

English footballer (born 1939)

Personal information
- Full name: Peter Hall
- Date of birth: 29 September 1939 (age 87)
- Place of birth: Stoke-on-Trent, England
- Position: Right winger

Youth career
- Stoke City

Senior career*
Years	Team	Apps	(Gls)
1958–1961	Port Vale	16	(3)
1961–1962	Bournemouth & Boscombe Athletic	0	(0)
1962–1965	Yeovil Town		
1965–1967	Bedford Town		
1967	Gillingham	9	(1)
- Margate
- * Club domestic league appearances and goals

Peter Hall (born 29 September 1939) is an English former professional footballer who played on the right-wing for Stoke City, Port Vale, Bournemouth & Boscombe Athletic, Yeovil Town, Bedford Town, Gillingham, and Margate in the Football League and Southern League. He helped the "Valiants" to win the Fourth Division title in 1958–59, and helped the "Glovers" to win the Southern League title in 1963–64.

== Career ==
Hall played for Stoke City before joining cross town rivals Port Vale as a teenager in May 1958. Manager Norman Low asked him to join the club after seeing him score the winning goals in the FA County Youth Cup final. He scored his first goal at Vale Park on 27 September 1958, in a 3–2 defeat to Crystal Palace. In all he scored two goals in nine appearances as the "Valiants" won the Fourth Division title in the 1958–59 campaign. He scored two goals in 13 games in the 1959–60 season, as Vale adapted well to the Third Division. However, Hall featured just four times in the 1960–61 season, and was given a free transfer to league rivals Bournemouth & Boscombe Athletic in May 1961. He never featured for Bill McGarry's "Cherries" in the 1961–62 campaign, and left Dean Court for Southern League side Yeovil Town. He helped Basil Hayward's "Glovers" to win the league title in 1963–64. He left Huish Park for Bedford Town in the summer of 1965. He left the "Eagles" after they were relegated out of the Premier Division of the Southern League in 1966–67, having scored 60 goals in 103 club appearances. He returned to the Football League Third Division for a short stint with Gillingham, where he rejoined manager Basil Hayward after being signed for a fee of £1,500 in 1967. His stay at the Priestfield Stadium was cut short due to a knee injury, and he featured in just nine league games for the "Gills". He later played for Almer Hall's Margate back in the Southern League, before he was forced to retire due to persistent knee injuries. He returned to Stoke-on-Trent after retiring from football, and settled in Northwood.

== Career statistics ==
Appearances and goals by club, season and competition
Club	Season	League			FA Cup		League Cup		Total	
Club	Season	Division	Apps	Goals	Apps	Goals	Apps	Goals	Apps	Goals
Port Vale	1958–59	Fourth Division	9	1	0	0	—		9	2
Port Vale	1959–60	Third Division	4	2	0	0	—		4	2
Port Vale	1960–61	Third Division	3	0	0	0	—		3	0
Port Vale	Total		16	3	0	0	0	0	16	3
Bournemouth & Boscombe Athletic	1961–62	Third Division	0	0	0	0	1	0	1	0
Gillingham	1967–68	Third Division	9	1	0	0	0	0	9	1

== Honours ==
Port Vale

- Football League Fourth Division: 1958–59

Yeovil Town

- Southern Football League: 1963–64
