= Dennis Bailey (footballer, born 1935) =

English footballer (born 1935)

Personal information
- Full name: Dennis Bailey
- Date of birth: 24 September 1935 (age 91)
- Place of birth: Biddulph, England
- Position: Forward

Senior career*
Years	Team	Apps	(Gls)
1953–1958	Bolton Wanderers	1	(0)
1958–1961	Port Vale	1	(0)
Total		2	(0)
- * Club domestic league appearances and goals

Dennis Bailey (born 24 September 1935) is an English former footballer who played as a forward. Though a player in the Football League for eight years between 1953 and 1961, he featured just once each for Bolton Wanderers and Port Vale.

== Career ==
Bailey played for Bolton Wanderers from 1953 to 1958 but only made one First Division appearance for Bill Ridding's "Trotters". He signed with Norman Low's Port Vale in August 1958. His only game in his three years at Vale Park was at outside-left in a 2–0 win over Shrewsbury Town on 22 November 1958; the "Valiants" went on to win the Fourth Division title in 1958–59. He left on a free transfer in May 1961.

== Career statistics ==
Appearances and goals by club, season and competition
Club	Season	League			FA Cup		Total	
Club	Season	Division	Apps	Goals	Apps	Goals	Apps	Goals
Bolton Wanderers	1956–57	First Division	1	0	0	0	1	0
Port Vale	1958–59	Fourth Division	1	0	0	0	1	0
Total			2	0	0	0	2	0

== Honours ==
Port Vale

- Football League Fourth Division: 1958–59
