= Graham Barnett (footballer) =

English footballer (1936–2019)

Personal information
- Full name: Graham Barnett
- Date of birth: 17 May 1936
- Place of birth: Boothen, Hanley, Stoke-on-Trent, England
- Date of death: 17 June 2019 (aged 83)
- Place of death: Bentilee, Stoke-on-Trent, England
- Position: Inside forward

Youth career
- 1952–1954: Stoke Boys' Club
- 1954–1956: Port Vale

Senior career*
Years	Team	Apps	(Gls)
1956–1960	Port Vale	49	(34)
1960–1961	Tranmere Rovers	32	(11)
1961–1962	Halifax Town	32	(10)
1962–1965	South Coast United	77	(58)
1966	Macclesfield Town	10	(6)
1967	South Coast United	22	(6)
1968–1969	Sydney Hakoah		
Total		200+	(119+)

International career
1964	Australia B	1	(0)

Managerial career
- 1967: South Coast United
- * Club domestic league appearances and goals

Graham Barnett (17 May 1936 – 17 June 2019) was an English footballer who played as an inside-forward.

He began his career with Port Vale in 1956 and helped the club to win the Fourth Division title in the 1958–59 season. He was sold to Tranmere Rovers for a £5,000 fee in March 1960. In 1961, he signed with Halifax Town before he emigrated to Australia the following year to play for South Coast United. He also represented the Australia B team in 1964. After a spell with Hakoah, he was appointed as manager of South Coast United. He later managed The Corinthians before returning to the UK to work behind the scenes at Port Vale.

== Career ==
=== Port Vale ===
From a mining family, Barnett worked down Hanley Deep Pit at 15. Expected to start a mining career, he instead impressed playing football at Canon Street School and Stoke Boys' Club and won an amateur contract at Port Vale in 1954. During his national service he played alongside Ken Higgs in the Army Medical Corps football side. He signed professionally for Port Vale in June 1956 and won a place in Freddie Steele's first-team after scoring 18 goals in 17 games for the reserves and also scoring twice past Middlesbrough's Rolando Ugolini in a friendly for the first-team. He scored on his debut at inside-left in a 4–2 defeat to Millwall at The Den on 13 December 1958. Manager Norman Low described him as the 'supreme goal poacher' as he netted 20 goals in 22 appearances in what was left of the season, helping the club to win the Fourth Division title. Despite this, he did not get on with Low and had many rows with his manager. He was the club's top scorer during the 1959–60 season with 17 goals in 35 games, including four against Halifax Town in a 7–0 win at Vale Park on 28 December. He also grew a beard and refused to shave until Vale were knocked out of the FA Cup, doing so after defeat to Aston Villa at the fifth round stage. The beard was shaved off by his wife in front of the media at Burslem cinema.

=== Tranmere Rovers ===
Barnett was sold to Peter Farrell's Tranmere Rovers for a £5,000 fee in March 1960. Tranmere were heading for relegation into the Fourth Division, but Barnett helped them to maintain their Third Division status by the end of the season. The "Superwhites" then failed to avoid relegation in the 1960–61 season under the stewardship of Walter Galbraith, and Barnett moved away from Prenton Park to Halifax Town in August 1961.

=== Halifax ===
Barnett scored nine goals in 32 Third Division appearances for Halifax in the 1961–62 campaign.

=== Australia ===
Barnett moved to Australia, where he played for NSW Division One sides South Coast United and Sydney Hakoah and coached at South Coast United. He also represented Australia in a "B team" game against English First Division club Everton at Melbourne's Olympic Park Stadium on 10 May 1964, which ended in an 8–2 defeat.

=== Macclesfield Town ===
Barnett returned to England and joined Cheshire County League side Macclesfield Town, scoring two goals on his debut in a 3–3 draw with Witton Albion at Moss Rose on 1 January 1966. He then scored another brace against Wrexham in his next appearance and would score a total of six goals in ten games for the "Silkmen".

== Later life ==
Barnett coached Vale's "A" team, later working in the club's commercial department and running the Y.T.S. team until 1985. At that point, he became a newsagent. He and wife Ena and went on to have three children, seven grandchildren, and eight great-grandchildren. He died at the age of 83 in June 2019, and the following year, his daughter, Jane Beresford, reported that the family had donated his brain to dementia research.

== Career statistics ==
Appearances and goals by club, season and competition
Club	Season	League			National Cup (Note: Includes FA Cup, Federation Cup)		League Cup (Note: Includes Football League Cup, Ampol Cup (NSW))		Total	
Club	Season	Division	Apps	Goals	Apps	Goals	Apps	Goals	Apps	Goals
Port Vale	1958–59	Fourth Division	22	20	0	0	—		22	20
Port Vale	1959–60	Third Division	27	14	6	3	—		33	17
Port Vale	Total		49	34	6	3	0	0	55	37
Tranmere Rovers	1959–60	Third Division	11	5	0	0	—		11	5
Tranmere Rovers	1960–61	Third Division	21	6	0	0	0	0	21	6
Tranmere Rovers	Total		32	11	0	0	0	0	32	11
Halifax Town	1961–62	Third Division	32	10	1	0	1	0	34	10
South Coast United	1962	NSW First Division	16	7	3	1	0	0	19	8
South Coast United	1963	NSW First Division	22	18	?	?	0	0	22	18
South Coast United	1964	NSW First Division	21	15	5	8	1	0	27	23
South Coast United	1965	NSW First Division	18	18	2	0	0	0	20	18
South Coast United	Total		77	58	10	9	1	0	88	67
Macclesfield Town	1965–66	Cheshire County League	10	6	0	0	0	0	10	6
Career total			200	119	17	12	2	0	219	131

== Honours ==
Port Vale

- Football League Fourth Division: 1958–59
