= Fred Donaldson =

English footballer (1937–2018)

Personal information
- Full name: Frederick Lewis Donaldson
- Date of birth: 7 April 1937
- Place of birth: Stoke-on-Trent, England
- Date of death: 24 July 2018 (aged 81)
- Height: 6 ft 0 in (1.82 m)
- Positions: Right-back; inside forward; right-half

Youth career
- Port Vale

Senior career*
Years	Team	Apps	(Gls)
1954–1960	Port Vale	47	(4)
1960–1961	Exeter City	36	(6)
1961–1962	Chester	21	(0)
1962–1966	Macclesfield Town	172	(34)
1966–19??	Stafford Rangers		
Total		276	(44)
- * Club domestic league appearances and goals

Frederick Lewis Donaldson (7 April 1937 – 24 July 2018) was an English footballer who played as a full-back for Port Vale, Exeter City, Chester, Macclesfield Town and Stafford Rangers. He won the Fourth Division title with Port Vale in 1958–59.

== Career ==
=== Port Vale ===
Donaldson was born in Stoke-on-Trent and graduated through the junior squad at local club Port Vale to sign first-team forms in July 1954. He made his senior debut on 4 May 1955, in a 1–0 win over Lincoln City at Sincil Bank on the last day of the 1954–55 season. However, he had to wait until the start of the 1957–58 campaign before he played another game; by this time the "Valiants" had been relegated from the Second Division to the Third Division South, and Norman Low had replaced Freddie Steele as manager. Donaldson played 27 league games at right-back throughout the campaign, but featured only 11 times in the 1958–59 season as Vale won the Fourth Division title. He featured just eight times in the Third Division in the 1959–60 season, but claimed four goals against Colchester United, Accrington Stanley (2), and Newport County. He left Vale Park in August 1960, when he was sold to Exeter City for a £2,000 fee.

=== Later career ===
Donaldson made his debut for the "Grecians" in a 0–0 draw with Carlisle United at St James Park on the opening day of the 1960–61 season. He went on to score six goals in 36 Fourth Division games as Glen Wilson's finished 21st in the Fourth Division, before departing at the end of the campaign after remaining on the transfer-list for four months. He then played 20 Fourth Division games for Chester in the 1961–62 campaign, as the "Seals" finished bottom of the English Football League. He then left the Deva Stadium and later played for Cheshire County League sides Macclesfield Town and Stafford Rangers.

== Later life ==
Donaldson became a sales rep after retiring as a player, selling carpets and floorings. He married Iris and had two children, Linda and David. He remained a keen crown green bowler from his teenage years up until his death following a short illness on 24 July 2018.

== Style of play ==
Port Vale teammate Colin Askey described Donaldson as "a nice footballer, someone who liked to get the ball down and play", able to play in various positions from his preferred spot at right-back as well as inside-forward and right-half.

== Career statistics ==
Appearances and goals by club, season and competition
Club	Season	League			FA Cup		Other		Total	
Club	Season	Division	Apps	Goals	Apps	Goals	Apps	Goals	Apps	Goals
Port Vale	1954–55	Second Division	1	0	0	0	—		1	0
Port Vale	1955–56	Second Division	0	0	0	0	—		0	0
Port Vale	1956–57	Second Division	0	0	0	0	—		0	0
Port Vale	1957–58	Third Division South	27	0	0	0	—		27	0
Port Vale	1958–59	Fourth Division	11	0	0	0	—		11	0
Port Vale	1959–60	Third Division	8	4	0	0	—		8	4
Port Vale	Total		47	4	0	0	0	0	47	4
Exeter City	1960–61	Fourth Division	36	6	2	0	2	0	40	6
Chester	1961–62	Fourth Division	21	0	2	0	2	0	25	0
Macclesfield Town	1961–62	Cheshire County League	11	4	0	0	0	0	11	4
Macclesfield Town	1962–63	Cheshire County League	40	7	2	0	5	3	47	10
Macclesfield Town	1963–64	Cheshire County League	39	6	5	1	11	2	55	9
Macclesfield Town	1964–65	Cheshire County League	42	10	5	2	5	2	52	14
Macclesfield Town	1965–66	Cheshire County League	40	7	3	1	6	0	49	8
Macclesfield Town	Total		172	34	15	4	27	7	214	45
Career total (Note: Statistics for Stafford Rangers not known.)			276	44	19	4	31	7	326	55

== Honours ==
Port Vale

- Football League Fourth Division: 1958–59
