= David Corbett (footballer, born 1940) =

English footballer (1940–2020)

Personal information
- Full name: David Frank Corbett
- Date of birth: 15 April 1940
- Place of birth: Marshfield, England
- Date of death: 13 April 2020 (aged 79)
- Position: Right winger

Youth career
- Marshfield

Senior career*
Years	Team	Apps	(Gls)
1958–1962	Swindon Town	68	(3)
1962–1967	Plymouth Argyle	84	(8)
Total		152	(11)
- * Club domestic league appearances and goals

David Frank Corbett (15 April 1940 – 13 April 2020) was an English professional footballer who played as a right winger.

== Career ==
Born in Marshfield, Corbett played for Marshfield, Swindon Town and Plymouth Argyle, making 152 appearances in the Football League. He retired at the age of 26 due to injury.

== Later life and death ==
He died on 13 April 2020, aged 79.
