= Dave King (footballer, born 1940) =

English footballer

Personal information
- Full name: David John King
- Date of birth: 24 October 1940
- Place of birth: Hull, England
- Date of death: 16 July 2010 (aged 69)
- Place of death: Hull, England
- Position: Inside forward

Senior career*
Years	Team	Apps	(Gls)
1958–????	Hull City	65	(24)
- King's Lynn
Total		65	(24)
- * Club domestic league appearances and goals

David John King (24 October 1940 – 16 July 2010) was an English professional footballer who played as an inside forward in the Football League for Hull City, and in non-League football for King's Lynn.
