= Peter Ford (footballer) =

English footballer and manager (1933–2020)

Personal information
- Full name: Peter Leslie Ford
- Date of birth: 10 August 1933
- Place of birth: Etruria, Staffordshire, England
- Date of death: 17 July 2020 (aged 86)
- Position: Half-back

Youth career
- Cannon Street Youth Club

Senior career*
Years	Team	Apps	(Gls)
1955–1956	West Bromwich Albion	0	(0)
1956–1959	Stoke City	14	(0)
1959–1963	Port Vale	104	(5)
1963–1967	Macclesfield Town	112	(5)
- Stafford Rangers
Total		230	(10)

Managerial career
- Hanley Town
- Milton United
- * Club domestic league appearances and goals

Peter Leslie Ford (10 August 1933 – 17 July 2020) was an English footballer who played in the Football League for Port Vale and Stoke City. He later played for Macclesfield Town in the Cheshire County League.

== Career ==
Ford began his career as an amateur with West Bromwich Albion before joining Stoke City in 1956. He was never able to force his way into the plans of manager Frank Taylor. He made just 14 Second Division appearances in three years at the Victoria Ground. He transferred to Port Vale, along with Harry Oscroft, in exchange for Dickie Cunliffe and £2,000 in September 1959. The club were competing in the Third Division after winning the Fourth Division title.

He played 25 league and six FA Cup games in the 1959–60 season. However, he was diagnosed with Tuberculosis, along with teammate Terry Miles. He spent 12 weeks in hospital recovering after the disease was fortunately caught in the early stages. He missed just five league games in the 1960–61 campaign, and was a member of the side that won the Supporters' Clubs' Trophy. He was dropped by manager Norman Low in October 1961, and was used as a utility player in the 1961–62 and 1962–63 campaigns. He scored his first goal in the Football League on 3 September 1962, in a 4–2 win over Colchester United at Vale Park. He also scored goals against Southend United, Reading (2), Shrewsbury Town, and Gillingham, taking his tally to six goals in the 1962–63 season. He was released by manager Freddie Steele in the summer of 1963. He finished his career in the Cheshire County League with Macclesfield Town (122 appearances 5 goals) and Stafford Rangers. Upon his retirement from playing Ford became manager of Hanley Town, and later the coach of Milton United.

== Personal life ==
Ford was the oldest of four boys and two girls. He became a plumber after retiring as a footballer.

== Career statistics ==
Appearances and goals by club, season and competition
Club	Season	League			FA Cup		League Cup		Total	
Club	Season	Division	Apps	Goals	Apps	Goals	Apps	Goals	Apps	Goals
Stoke City	1956–57	Second Division	2	0	0	0	—		2	0
Stoke City	1957–58	Second Division	5	0	0	0	—		5	0
Stoke City	1958–59	Second Division	7	0	0	0	—		7	0
Stoke City	Total		14	0	0	0	—		14	0
Port Vale	1959–60	Third Division	25	0	6	0	—		31	0
Port Vale	1960–61	Third Division	41	0	3	0	3	0	47	0
Port Vale	1961–62	Third Division	13	0	0	0	1	0	14	0
Port Vale	1962–63	Third Division	25	5	3	1	1	0	29	6
Port Vale	Total		104	5	12	1	5	0	121	6
Macclesfield Town	1963–64	Cheshire County League	39	2	5	0	7	0	51	2
Macclesfield Town	1964–65	Cheshire County League	33	2	4	0	4	0	41	2
Macclesfield Town	1965–66	Cheshire County League	36	1	3	0	6	0	45	1
Macclesfield Town	1966–67	Cheshire County League	4	0	1	0	0	0	5	0
Macclesfield Town	Total		112	5	13	0	17	0	142	5
Career total			230	10	25	1	22	0	277	11

== Honours ==
Port Vale

- Supporters' Clubs' Trophy: 1961
