= Stan Steele =

English footballer

Personal information
- Full name: Stanley Frederick Steele
- Date of birth: 5 January 1937
- Place of birth: Fenton, Stoke-on-Trent, England
- Date of death: 15 July 2005 (aged 68)
- Place of death: Fenton, Stoke-on-Trent, England
- Positions: Half-back; inside forward

Youth career
- Foley and Hewitt's
- Port Vale

Senior career*
Years	Team	Apps	(Gls)
1955–1961	Port Vale	185	(66)
1961	West Bromwich Albion	1	(0)
1961–1965	Port Vale	148	(22)
1965–1967	Port Elizabeth City	43	(5)
1968	Port Vale	2	(0)
1968	Port Elizabeth City	17	(0)
- Eastwood
- Armitage
Total		396+	(93+)

Managerial career
- Great Haywood
- * Club domestic league appearances and goals

Stanley Frederick Steele (5 January 1937 – 15 July 2005) was an English footballer. A half-back and inside-forward, he scored 95 goals in 366 league and cup games for Port Vale between 1955 and 1968. His parents named him Stanley Frederick in honour of Stanley Matthews and Freddie Steele.

He was prolific in his first spell at Port Vale between 1955 and 1961 and hit 66 goals in 185 league games, helping the "Valiants" to the Fourth Division title in 1958–59. He was sold to West Bromwich Albion in March 1961 for £10,000 but returned to Port Vale for the same fee four months later. He proved to be less prolific in his second spell at the club and was given a free transfer in April 1965. He spent time in South Africa with Port Elizabeth City before a brief and unsuccessful third spell at Port Vale in January 1968. He later had spells with non-League clubs Eastwood, Armitage, and Great Haywood.

== Career ==
Steele graduated from the Port Vale juniors to sign professional forms in May 1955. He did not feature in the 1955–56 season, but instead made his debut on 6 October 1956, in a 3–1 defeat to Middlesbrough at Ayresome Park. He scored his first senior goal on 3 November, in a 4–1 win over Liverpool at Anfield. On the last day of the 1956–57 season he scored past Potteries derby rivals Stoke City in a 2–2 draw at Vale Park, and finished the campaign with three goals in 12 games. However, the season was a disaster for the club, and legendary manager Freddie Steele resigned from his post with Vale plummeting to the bottom of the Second Division.

With the "Valiants" now in the Third Division South and under the stewardship of Norman Low, Steele managed to establish himself in the first team. He hit a hat-trick past Southampton in a 4–0 home win on 16 September, and finished the 1957–58 season as the club's top scorer with 22 goals in 49 appearances. On 30 October 1957, he was selected to play for the Third Division South representative team in what finished as a 2–2 draw with the Third Division North team. Due to a restructuring of the Football League, Vale were placed in the Fourth Division in 1958–59. They proved to be too strong for the division, and won the title with a record 110 goals scored; Low described Steele as "the model of consistency" and "did the work of two men" as he hit 22 goals in 47 games to again finish as the club's top scorer. He then hit 11 goals in 54 appearances in 1959–60, as Vale finished in 14th place in the Third Division. Steele hit 14 goals in 43 games in 1960–61 but was rested after 199 consecutive appearances between April 1957 and March 1961. He immediately put in a transfer request, and was sold to West Bromwich Albion for £10,000 in March 1961.

Steele appeared in one First Division game for the "Baggies", before Port Vale bought him back for £10,000 in July 1961. He hit just eight goals in 38 games in 1961–62 and started the 1962–63 season on the transfer-list after being singled out for abuse by hecklers. He retained his first-team place under returning manager Freddie Steele and hit seven goals in 40 games as the Vale missed out on promotion by just four points. Steele was limited to six goals in 50 appearances in 1963–64 and scored just three goals in 35 games in 1964–65. His goal in a 2–0 home win over Workington on 29 March would be the last of his 55 goals at the Vale Park ground, a club record that would last until Tom Pope scored his 56th at the stadium in September 2018. Vale were relegated at the end of the season, and he was not retained by new manager Jackie Mudie, and so was handed a free transfer in April 1965.

Steele played for the South African side Port Elizabeth City but rejoined Port Vale on trial in January 1968. He did not re-sign, however, only playing two games, and in the match against Aldershot on 3 February 1968, managed to score an 'incredible' own goal by lobbing the ball over Stuart Sharratt's head as Vale lost 3–0 at home. He later returned to Port Elizabeth City and also played for Eastwood and Armitage before retiring. Upon his retirement from playing, he became the coach of Great Haywood.

== Career statistics ==
Appearances and goals by club, season and competition
Club	Season	League			FA Cup		League Cup		Total	
Club	Season	Division	Apps	Goals	Apps	Goals	Apps	Goals	Apps	Goals
Port Vale	1956–57	Second Division	12	3	0	0	—		12	3
Port Vale	1957–58	Third Division South	46	21	3	1	—		49	22
Port Vale	1958–59	Fourth Division	46	22	1	0	—		47	22
Port Vale	1959–60	Third Division	46	10	6	1	—		52	11
Port Vale	1960–61	Third Division	35	10	3	0	3	3	41	13
Port Vale	Total		185	66	13	2	3	3	201	71
West Bromwich Albion	1960–61	First Division	1	0	0	0	0	0	1	0
Port Vale	1961–62	Third Division	35	8	2	0	1	0	38	8
Port Vale	1962–63	Third Division	35	6	4	1	1	0	40	7
Port Vale	1963–64	Third Division	44	5	5	1	1	0	50	6
Port Vale	1964–65	Third Division	34	3	1	0	0	0	35	3
Port Vale	Total		148	22	12	2	3	0	163	24
Port Vale	1967–68	Fourth Division	2	0	0	0	0	0	2	0
Career total			336	88	25	4	6	3	367	95

== Honours ==
Port Vale

- Football League Fourth Division: 1958–59
