= Norman Low =

Scottish footballer (1914–1994)

Personal information
- Full name: Norman Harvey Low
- Date of birth: 23 March 1914
- Place of birth: Aberdeen, Scotland
- Date of death: 21 May 1994 (aged 80)
- Place of death: Toronto, Ontario, Canada
- Position: Centre-half

Youth career
- Rosehill Villa
- 1931–1933: Newcastle United

Senior career*
Years	Team	Apps	(Gls)
1933–1936	Liverpool	13	(0)
1936–1946	Newport County	112	(0)
1946–1950	Norwich City	150	(0)
Total		275	(0)

Managerial career
- 1950–1955: Norwich City
- 1956–1957: Workington
- 1957–1962: Port Vale
- 1967–1968: Witton Albion
- 1968: Cleveland Stokers
- * Club domestic league appearances and goals

Norman Harvey Low (23 March 1914 – 21 May 1994) was a Scottish football player and manager. He was the son of Scottish international footballer, Wilf Low.

A centre-half, he played for Newcastle United between 1931 and 1933, before three years with Liverpool. From 1936 up until the end of World War II, he turned out for Newport County, helping the club to the Third Division South title in 1938–39. After the war, he spent 1946 to 1950 with Norwich City.

In 1950, he was appointed Norwich City's manager and led the club to a second-place finish in the Third Division South in 1950–51. Despite this, promotion eluded him before he departed in April 1955. He spent January 1956 to February 1957 as Workington's manager before he was installed in the hot seat at Port Vale. He led the club to the Fourth Division title in 1958–59, before resigning in October 1962. Spending time as a scout at Stoke City and Liverpool, he was made Witton Albion manager in 1967, before he took to the United States for a brief spell in charge of the Cleveland Stokers in 1968.

== Playing career ==
Low was a youth player at Newcastle United but began his professional career with Liverpool. The dominant centre-half struggled to get into the first-team, though did play eleven consecutive games in place of Tom Bradshaw for the First Division club during the first half of the 1934–35 season.

Leaving Anfield in 1936, he then spent ten years with Newport County, a club struggling in the bottom half of the Third Division South table. The "Exiles" finished 19th, two points above the re-election zone in 1936–37, and then ended the 1937–38 campaign in 16th place. They then improved massively, finishing top of the division in 1938–39 under the stewardship of Billy McCandless, three points ahead of Crystal Palace. He played a total of 112 league games for the club.

During World War II he also guested for Bristol City, Everton, Liverpool, Swindon Town and Lovell's Athletic. In 1946 he moved onto Duggie Lochhead's Norwich City, a team struggling near the foot of the Third Division South table. They had to apply for re-election in 1946–47, finishing in the penultimate spot, level on points with bottom club Mansfield Town. They finished 21st again in 1947–48, ahead of bottom club Brighton & Hove Albion due to a superior goal average. The "Canaries" rallied to a tenth-place finish in 1948–49, before recording an eleventh-place finish in 1949–50. Low played 150 league games in four years at Carrow Road.

== Managerial career ==
=== Norwich City ===
Low was appointed manager of Norwich City in 1950 and led the club to a second-place finish in the Third Division South in 1950–51. However, only champions Nottingham Forest were promoted. His team finished third in 1951–52, five points behind champions Plymouth Argyle. They dropped a place again to fourth in 1952–53, though they were only four points behind champions Bristol Rovers. However, they dropped to seventh in 1953–54, 13 points shy of Ipswich Town. The 1954–55 season was also disappointing, and Low left the club in April 1955.

=== Workington ===
Low worked as Workington manager from January 1956 to February 1957. The "Reds" finished tenth in the Third Division North in 1955–56, and ended the 1956–57 season in fourth place under his replacement Tommy Jones.

=== Port Vale ===
Low was made manager of Port Vale in February 1957. Replacing Freddie Steele, who developed the Steel/Iron curtain, Low adopted an attacking policy, instructing his players "to go out and entertain the public" and "he never discussed the opposition". However, Vale were already heading out of the Second Division, and went on to finish in last place in 1956–57. Low announced a new youth policy at Vale Park, and promptly released Cyril Done (Winsford United); Ray King (sold to Boston United for £2,500); Reg Potts and Stan Turner (Worcester City); Tommy Cheadle, Stan Smith, and Derek Mountford (Crewe Alexandra); Len Stephenson and Billy Spurdle (Oldham Athletic); and Harry Anders (Accrington Stanley).

Preparing for the Third Division South campaign in 1957–58, he said his team would "fight like hell to get back into the Second Division". He signed impressive forward Jack Wilkinson (Sheffield United); Welsh international goalkeeper Keith Jones (signed from Aston Villa for £3,500); defender Bert Carberry (Gillingham); and Alan Martin – who returned to the club as a part-time professional. His team were third in the league by November, and he added to his squad with the signatures of Bert Carberry and Jack Wilkinson. However, they then lost their form, and Low attempted to shake things up by selling Ken Griffiths to Mansfield Town and bringing in Noel Kinsey from Birmingham City for £5,000. Vale eventually finished 15th, the bottom half of the table, and therefore were invited to form the newly created Fourth Division.

Low signed 'speedy and direct' winger Brian Jackson from Liverpool for £2,000, experienced left-back Roy Pritchard from Notts County, and Peter Hall from Stoke City. They picked up just two points from their first five home games before turning Vale Park into a fortress. In mid-season he handed keeper Ken Hancock and striker Graham Barnett their débuts. Vale went twelve games unbeaten to rise to the top of the table and thrashed Gateshead 8–0 on Boxing Day. He put veteran Roy Sproson back into the defensive line, whilst up front Stan Steele 'did the work of two men', Harry Poole brought 'flexibility and fluidity', and Graham Barnett scored from half-chances. They finished as Fourth Division champions in 1958–59 with 64 points, four points clear of second, and seven clear of fifth spot, scoring a club record 110 goals.

In preparation for the 1959–60 Third Division campaign, Low signed Morgan Hunt from Norwich City for a four-figure fee, and outside-left Cliff Portwood from Preston North End for £750. He also tried to sign Stanley Matthews from Blackpool, but a deal could not be reached for the 44-year-old. Low then traded John Cunliffe and £2,000 to Stoke City in exchange for winger Harry Oscroft and centre-half Peter Ford. In March, an out-of-form Graham Barnett was sold to Tranmere Rovers for £5,000, leaving Vale without 'a top-class inside-forward'. In the FA Cup, Vale reached the fifth round, and 49,768 crammed into Vale Park to witness a 2–1 defeat to Aston Villa. They ended the league campaign in 14th place, ten points above the relegation zone.

Low prepared for the 1960–61 season by recruiting former Wales international inside-right Noel Kinsey from Birmingham City as a player-coach, and 21-year-old outside-left Dennis Fidler from the Manchester City Reserves. His £10,000 offer for Aston Villa's Gerry Hitchens was rejected, whilst interest in re-signing Ronnie Allen also went nowhere. Low instead got 'bustling' Ted Calland on a free transfer from Exeter City, and sold Fred Donaldson to Exeter for £2,000. In November he signed Bert Llewellyn from Crewe Alexandra for £7,000. His team put in some memorable performances, including a 5–0 win over Grimsby Town at Blundell Park, in what Roy Sproson later described as his 'greatest memory' and 'one of their finest hours'; the performance was so impressive they received 'a standing ovation' from the home crowd, as the "Valiants" finished the game 'rolling the ball about like a game of chess'. Vale were in the promotion hunt until late in the season, as Low released Albert Leake and sold Stan Steele to West Bromwich Albion for £10,000. Vale recorded a seventh-place finish, and Low ended the campaign by releasing Harry Oscroft (Brantham Athletic), Ted Calland (Lincoln City), John Poole (Macclesfield Town), and Peter Hall (Bournemouth & Boscombe Athletic).

He added to his squad for the 1961–62 campaign by spending £2,000 on inside-forward Arthur Longbottom (Queens Park Rangers); £10,000 on Stan Steele (back from West Brom); and £2,000 on centre-half John Nicholson (Liverpool); whilst free signings included winger Stan Edwards (Everton), goalkeeper Peter Taylor (Middlesbrough), and Joe Maloney (Shrewsbury Town). He sold Cliff Portwood to Grimsby Town for £6,000 to balance the books. The Sentinel commented that "gloom has descended" following a poor start to the season, however, the Vale's form improved after Low sold Dennis Fidler to Grimsby Town for £2,000, signed Colin Grainger from Leeds United for £6,000, and further added to his firepower by signing Ralph Hunt from Swindon Town for £3,500. Stanley Matthews' return to the Victoria Ground resulted in Low unsuccessfully trying to tempt Tom Finney out of retirement. The Vale finished in 12th place, and Low sold three players for £2,000 each: Brian Jackson to Peterborough United, Ralph Hunt to Newport County, and David Raine to Doncaster Rovers.

Low planned for the 1962–63 season by signing John Rowland, a 'tall and skilful' outside-right from Nottingham Forest, for £6,000. His team began reasonably well. However, Low could not 'see eye to eye with the board on their buying policy' and tendered his resignation in October 1962. One staff member later reported that Low had travelled to Huddersfield Town to sign Willie Davie for a £20,000 fee; However, during his absence the Port Vale directors finalised agreements for Freddie Steele to return to the club, and upon his return he found himself out of a job.

=== Later career ===
Low later served as a scout at Stoke City and Liverpool before taking up the reins at non-League Witton Albion in 1967. He later emigrated to North America, where he became the coach of the short-lived National Professional Soccer League side Cleveland Stokers.

== Personal life ==
He was the son of Scottish international player Wilf Low. His uncle Harry and cousin Willie were also footballers.

== Career statistics ==
=== Playing statistics ===
Appearances and goals by club, season and competition
Club	Season	League			FA Cup		Other		Total	
Club	Season	Division	Apps	Goals	Apps	Goals	Apps	Goals	Apps	Goals
Liverpool	1934–35	First Division	11	0	0	0	0	0	11	0
Liverpool	1935–36	First Division	1	0	0	0	0	0	1	0
Liverpool	1936–37	First Division	1	0	0	0	0	0	1	0
Liverpool	Total		13	0	0	0	0	0	13	0
Newport County	1936–37	Third Division South	28	0	2	0	0	0	30	0
Newport County	1937–38	Third Division South	38	0	4	0	2	0	44	0
Newport County	1938–39	Third Division South	42	0	4	0	1	0	47	0
Newport County	1939–40		0	0	0	0	3	0	3	0
Newport County	1945–46		0	0	5	0	0	0	5	0
Newport County	1946–47	Second Division	4	0	0	0	0	0	4	0
Newport County	Total		112	0	15	0	6	0	133	0
Norwich City	1946–47	Third Division South	32	0	3	0	0	0	35	0
Norwich City	1947–48	Third Division South	36	0	3	0	0	0	39	0
Norwich City	1947–48	Third Division South	40	0	2	0	0	0	42	0
Norwich City	1948–50	Third Division South	42	0	5	0	0	0	47	0
Norwich City	Total		150	0	13	0	0	0	163	0
Career total			275	0	28	0	6	0	309	0

=== Managerial statistics ===
Managerial record by team and tenure
Team	From	To	Record				
Team	From	To	P	W	D	L	Win %
Norwich City	4 March 1950	22 April 1955	258	129	56	73	50.0
Workington	1 January 1956	1 February 1957	53	24	14	15	45.3
Port Vale	1 February 1957	1 October 1962	285	116	65	104	40.7
Total			596	269	135	192	45.1

== Honours ==
=== As a player ===
Newport County

- Football League Third Division South: 1938–39

=== As a manager ===
Port Vale

- Football League Fourth Division: 1958–59

== See also ==
- List of Scottish football families
