= The Sentinel (Staffordshire) =

Daily regional newspaper in England

- The Sentinel logo
- Type: Daily newspaper Monday to Saturday
- Format: Tabloid
- Owner: Reach plc
- Editor: Marc Waddington
- Staff writers: Phil Corrigan (politics); Peter Smith (Stoke City FC); Mike Baggaley (Port Vale FC); Leah Cassady (Staffordshire Newsletter); Hayley Parker; Jon Bamber; Ruby Davies
- Founded: 1854; 172 years ago
- Political alignment: Non-partisan
- Language: English
- Headquarters: Sentinel House, Bethesda Street, Hanley, Stoke-on-Trent, United Kingdom
- Circulation: 7,168 (as of 2024)
- ISSN: 0307-0999
- OCLC number: 1064876056
- Website: stokesentinel.co.uk

The Sentinel, previously known online as Stoke-on-Trent Live, is a daily regional newspaper circulating in the North Staffordshire and South Cheshire areas of England. It is owned by Reach plc and based at Hanley, Stoke-on-Trent.

It is the only newspaper delivering daily news and features on professional football clubs Stoke City, Port Vale and Crewe Alexandra. The Sentinel also operates a website with sections on news, sport and entertainment, as well as a comprehensive directory of local businesses.

The publication, which became a morning paper in 2009, is printed from Monday to Saturday.

== Circulation area ==
The Sentinel's patch includes the six towns of The Potteries (Hanley, Burslem, Tunstall, Fenton, Longton and Stoke), Newcastle-under-Lyme, Leek, Cheadle, Cheddleton, Crewe, Nantwich, Alsager, Sandbach, Stafford, Stone, Biddulph, Congleton and Eccleshall.

From 29 June 2015 to 3 January 2016 it had an average daily circulation of 30,957, down from 33,426 from 29 December 2014 to 28 June 2015, and 35,112 during the six months before that.

== History ==
In 1854, The Staffordshire Sentinel and Commercial and General Advertiser was first published as a Liberal weekly newspaper from offices in Cheapside, Hanley, on 7 January. The publisher was Hugh Roberts, the Editor Thomas Phillips, a former Northampton bookseller and printer.

One of the objects of the publishers was to campaign for the incorporation of Hanley, but news of the whole pottery district was contained in its columns. The initial price was 3d. By 1873: The Staffordshire Daily Sentinel was introduced at a halfpenny on Tuesday 15 April, publishing daily editions from Monday to Friday, with the Weekly Sentinel, at two pence, continuing to appear on Saturday with by 1883 a large sports section. The Sentinel was the first daily paper to be published in the Potteries.

In 1892, Thomas Twyford agreed a merger between his own paper, the Staffordshire Post, and the Sentinel, with the apparent objective of removing political leanings. In 1898, a new paper company was registered as the Staffordshire Sentinel Ltd.

The Daily sentinel ran until 1929 before being replaced by the Evening edition, the Weekly Sentinel ran until 1985, after which only the Evening Sentinel continued. A full archive of the versions of the paper is available up to 1995 on the British Newspaper Archive.

In 2007 the broadsheet Sentinel Sunday ceased production. In 2012: Local World acquired the Sentinel, along with other newspapers owned by Northcliffe Media, from the Daily Mail and General Trust. In 2015, the Sentinel's parent company, Local World, was acquired by the Trinity Mirror Group.

The newspaper was based at Sentinel House on Bethesda Street, Hanley. In 2021, Reach PLC announced the office would close with all journalists subsequently working from home.

Marc Waddington became the editor in 2020.
