= Devons =

Devons is a surname. Notable people with the surname include:

- Ely Devons (1913–1967), British economist
- Samuel Devons (1914–2006), British physicist

Fictional characters

- Bill Devons, protagonist of 1938 American film Hollywood Stadium Mystery

== See also ==
- Devon (surname)
