= Hanley High School, Stoke-on-Trent =

Hanley High School

Location
- Corneville Road; Townsend, Bucknall, Staffordshire, ST2 9EY; England
- Coordinates: 53°01′21″N 2°07′52″W

Information
- Type: Community school
- Established: 1894 mixed, 1953 Boys
- Closed: 1970
- Local authority: Stoke on Trent
- Gender: Mixed
- Age: 11 to 18

Hanley High School founded in 1894 was originally a co-educational grammar school based in the centre of Stoke on Trent. In 1938, the girls moved to Thistley Hough High School for Girls, and, due to subsidence making the school buildings unsafe, the boys' school moved to new premises in Bucknall in 1953.

== Headteachers ==
During the 76 years of the school's existence it was served by six headmasters. The first was F B Gill (1894 - 1897), followed by W M Wilson (1897 - 1924), W D Evans (1924 – 1927), E Graham Laws (1927 – 1951), R V Gardner (1951 – 1958) and finally W Barwise (1959 – 1970).

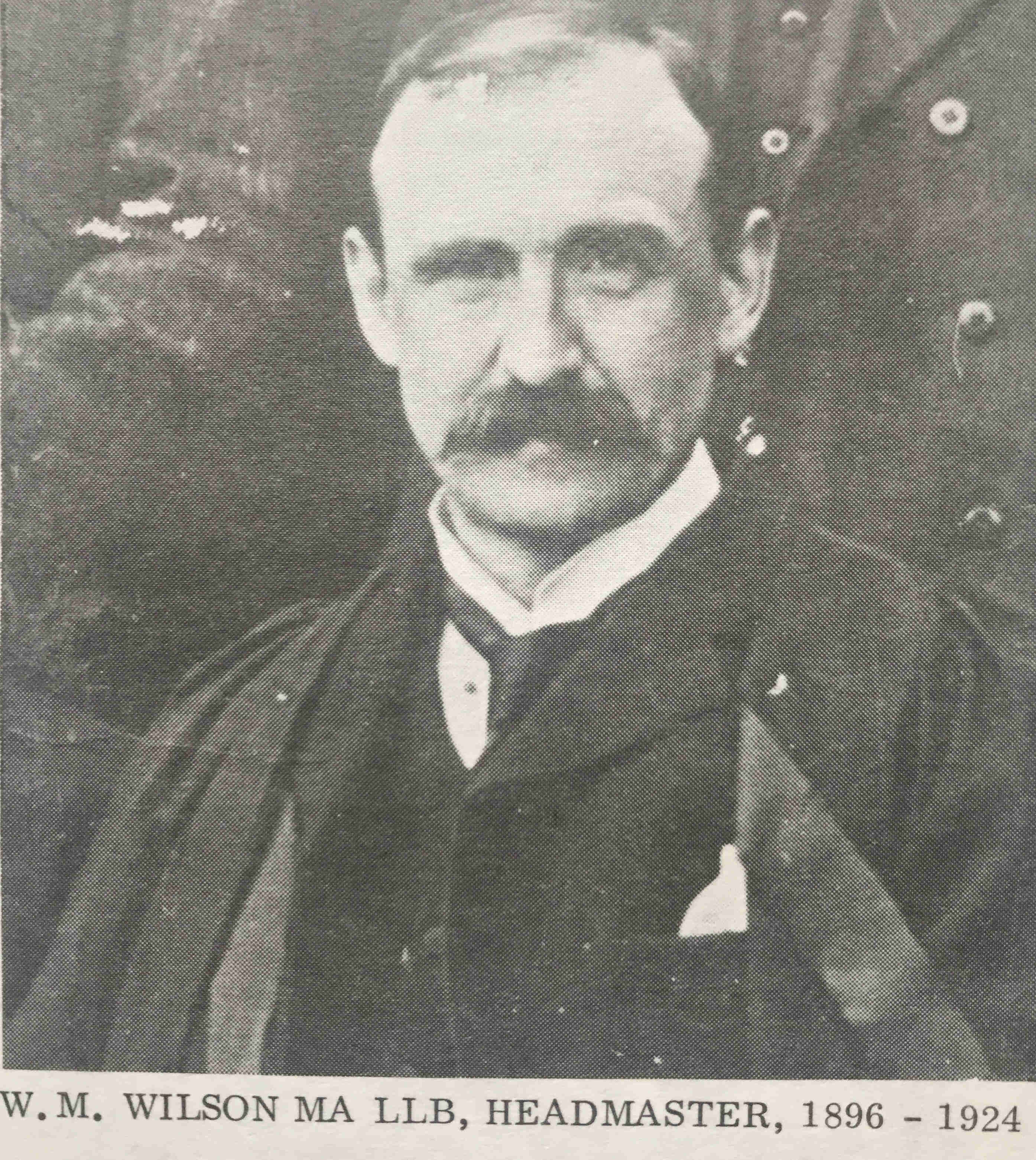
W M Wilson (1897-1924)

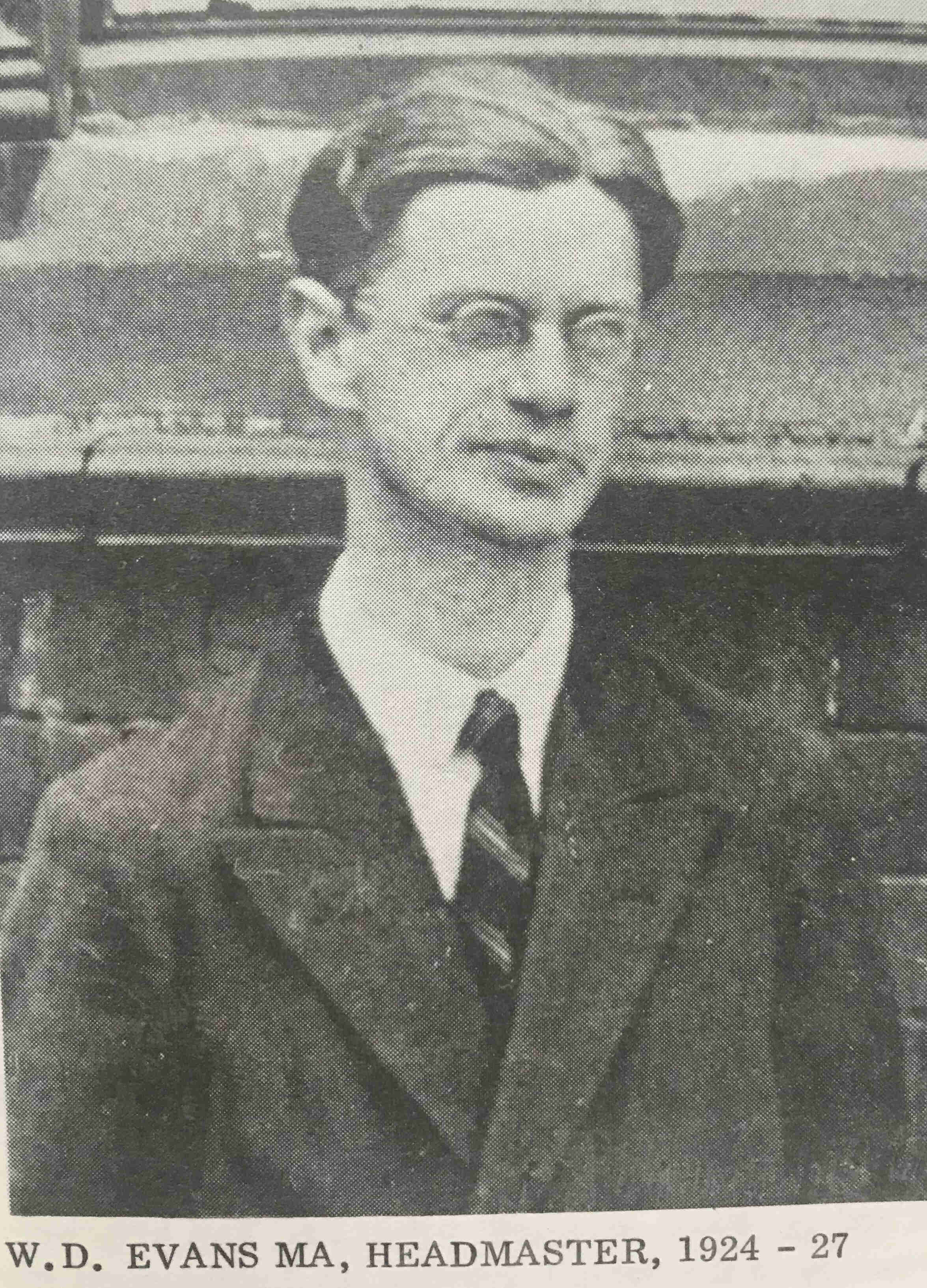
W D Evans (1924-1927)

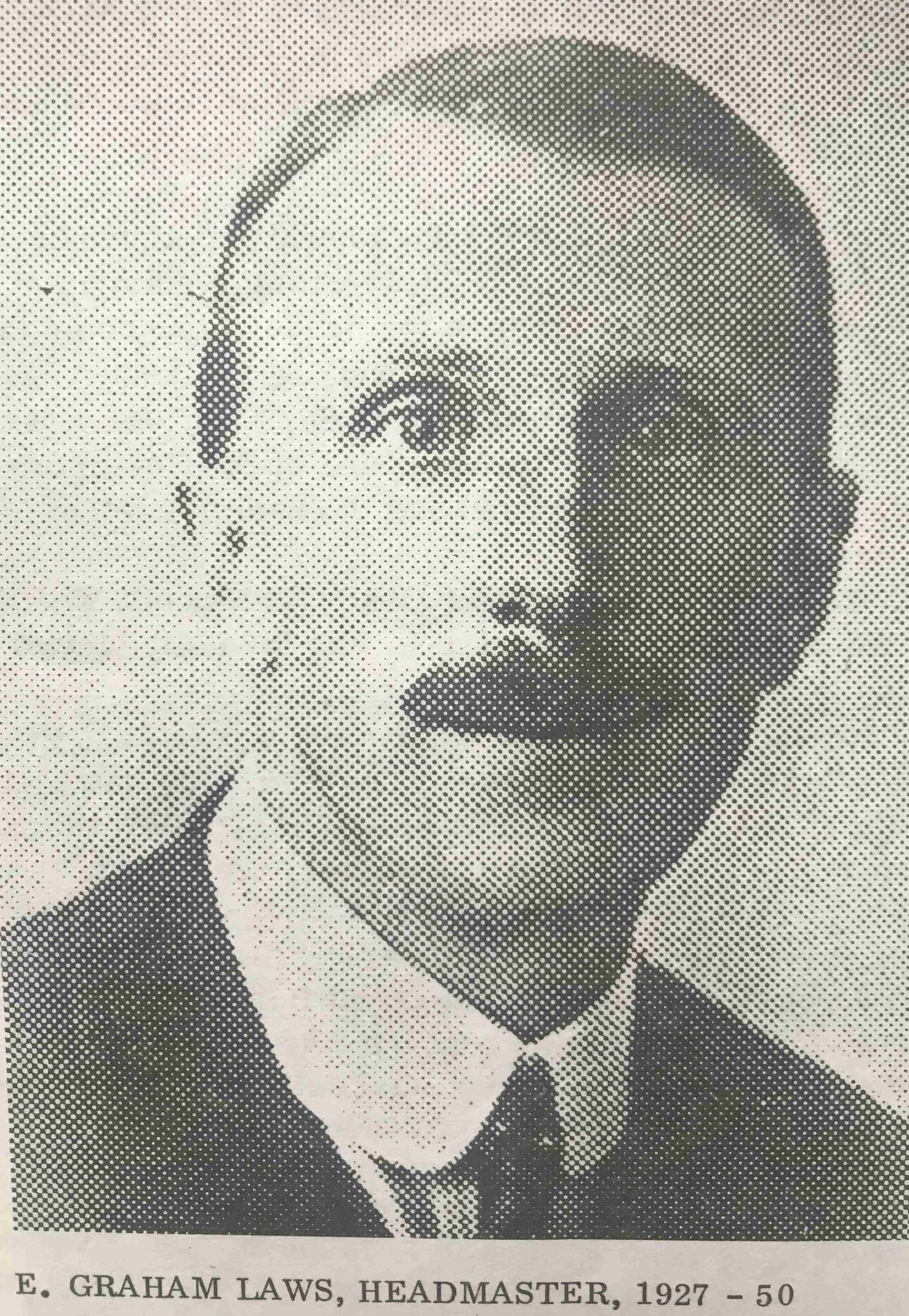
E Graham Laws (1927-1951)

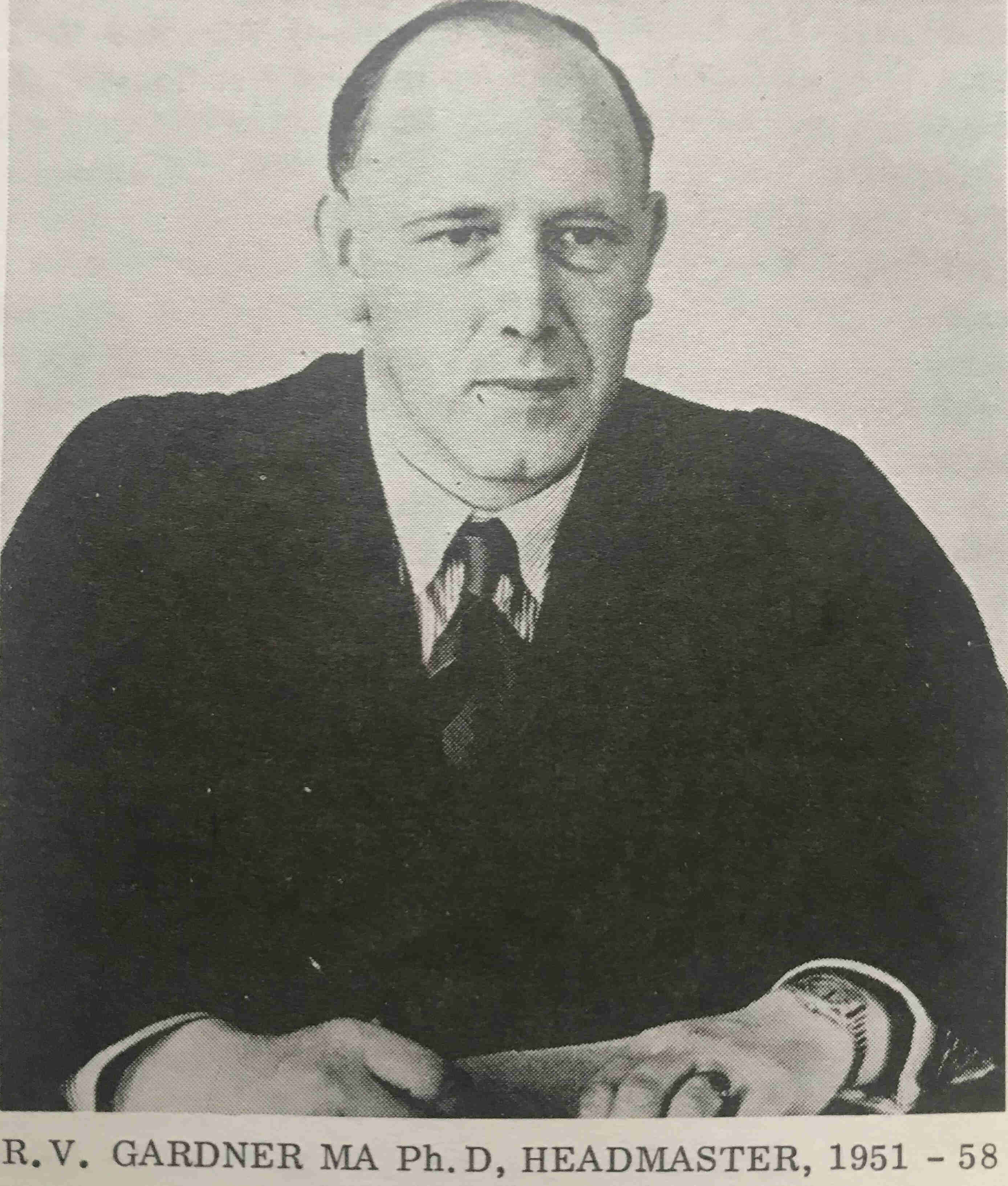
R V Gardner (1951-1958)

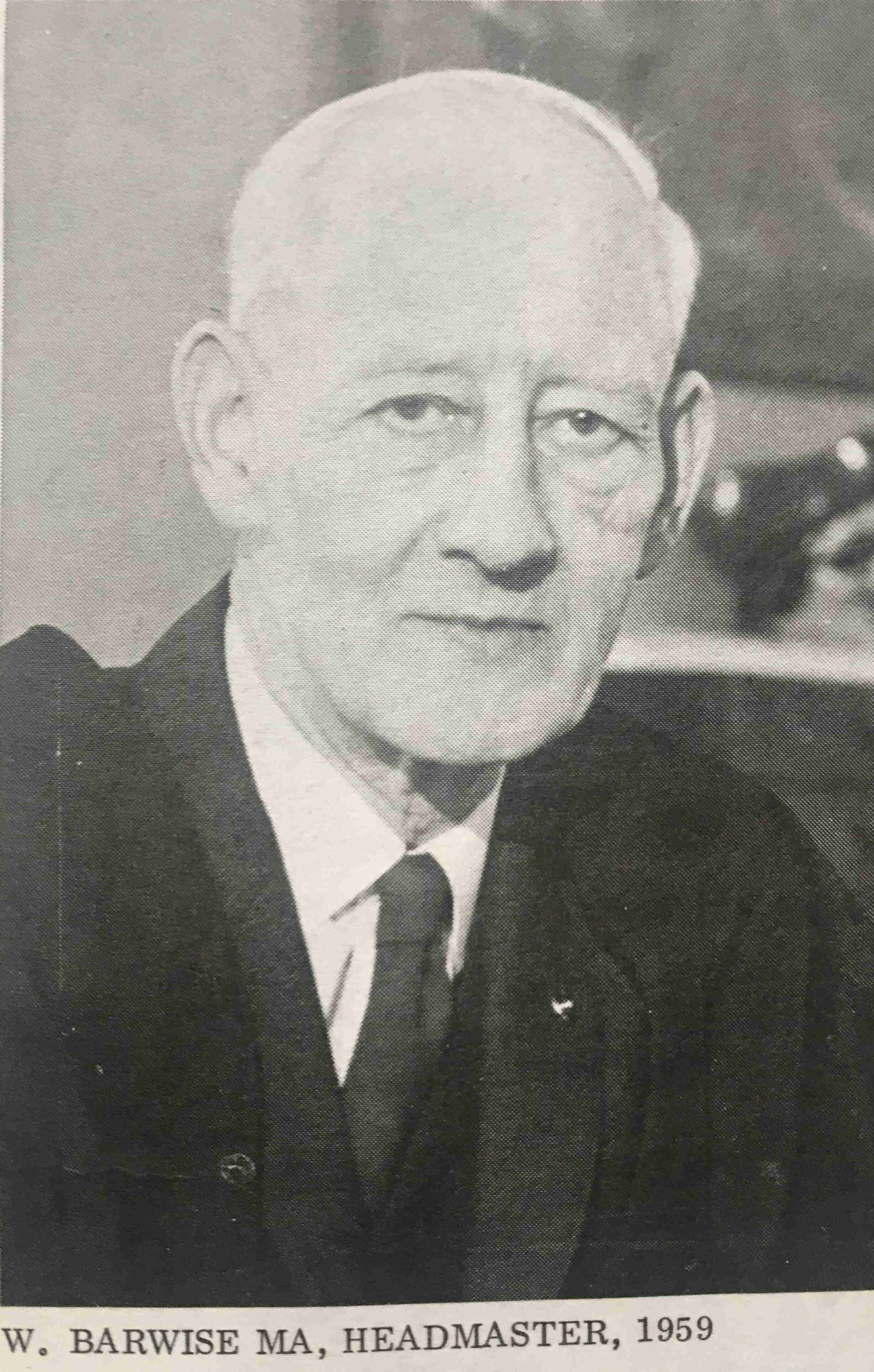
W Barwise (1959-1970)

== The Hanley Higher Grade School : 1894 - 1902 ==
The school was officially opened on 18 April by the chairman of the Hanley School Board, Mr T W Harrison. The school building, known as Central Hall in the middle of Hanley, was designed by the architect Mr Scrivener, at a cost of £17,500 for the building and equipment, and with considerable misgivings by local ratepayers at increase in rates to pay for the school The school opened with 720 pupils, both boys and girls, although only 76 were in the ‘higher’ section of the school, the rest being in the Elementary section. The year 1900 was notable for the winning of the first University Open Scholarship by L N Barker who went on to get a first class honours in Physics at Manchester University.

=== Extracts from the school log book ===
- 17 December 1895: first HMI inspection: ‘school shows excellent promise’.
- 5 February 1897: Mr Ridge allowing his boys to say Shakespearian lines without preserving dialogue – his attention has been drawn to this in December last.
- 13 May 1897: attendance poor in the afternoon ... Horse Show in Hanley Park.
- 22 July 1898: school closed in recognition of May Lawton obtaining a 1st at the London University Matriculation Exam.
- 11 Nov 1898: Barnum & Bailey’s Show in town; pupil numbers down by half.
- 2 March 1900: school closed in recognition of the Relief of Ladysmith.
- 21 May 1900: school closed in recognition of the Relief of Mafeking.
- 2 Feb 1901: school closed on the occasion of the funeral of Queen Victoria.

== Hanley Municipal Secondary School : 1902 - 1925 ==
In 1902 the ‘higher’ section of the school was renamed the ‘Day Secondary School’, and two years later was changed again, this time to the Hanley Municipal Secondary School, when the elementary section was closed due to the growth of the Secondary School. During this time a field was obtained for football but no ground was available for cricket.

The First World War took a heavy toll with over one hundred Old Hanliensians killed.

=== Extracts from the school log book ===
- 27 Nov 1903: The Right Hon. The Earl of Carlisle and Lady Cecilia Roberts (sic) visited the school.
- 25 April 1904: attendance very poor ... the presence of the ‘Buffalo Bill & his Wild West Show’ in Stoke proved a great attraction for the absentees.
- 7 Jan 1907: An entrance examination was held with 21 candidates presenting themselves and one was admitted.
- 6 April 1911: a number of boys and girls attended the matinee of ‘Julius Caesar’ at the Theatre Royal.
- 22 Feb 1915: Half Term holiday to celebrate the success of Frank Harrison gaining an Open Scholarship at Jesus College, Cambridge. The first such distinction for a school pupil.
- 20 Nov 1917: School closed to mark the honour gained by 2/Lt J Quinton R.G.A. who has won the Military Cross in France.
- 6 July 1918: Epidemic of Spanish influenza in the district resulting in a large number of boys and girls being absent.
- 12 Nov 1918: School closed to mark the surrender of Germany.
- 6 March 1919: Mr W H Marshall returned to the school having been demobilised.
- 11 May 1921: Closed early in order to play the Old Boys at football on the Port Vale ground.
- 26 May 1921: At least 1,000 parents, friends, teachers and pupils present at the unveiling of the school War Memorial in the Central Hall by Col. John V Campbell VC, DSO, ADC.
- 22 March 1923: A number of pupils went to see Henry Baynton in ‘Twelfth Night’ at the Theatre.
- 26 Apr 1923: Closed all day to celebrate the wedding of the Duke of York and Lady Elizabeth Bowes-Lyon.
- 20 Dec 1923: Mr J O Hughes (Classics Master) killed in a motor accident.
- 15 Jan 1924: School re-opens. Headmaster absent – ill.
- 26 Jan 1924: Headmaster’s illness takes a serious turn.
- 19 Feb 1924: Death of Mr W M Wilson, Headmaster.
- 23 Feb 1924: School closed for Mr Wilson’s funeral.

== Hanley High School : 1924 – 1953 ==
Mr W M Wilson, who had been headteacher for 27 years, died suddenly in early 1924 and was succeeded by Mr W D Evans. During Mr Evans’ short tenure of only three years, he oversaw the School re-named as ‘Hanley High School’, and in this period he also re-organised the house names. East House became Harrison House (after the first chair of the school board) South House became Wilson House (after the second headteacher who died 1924) North House became Wardle House (after a popular master who died in 1915) West House became The School House (later Mitchell House, after Reginald J Mitchell) Mr Evans successor was Mr E Graham Laws, who had been the Head of Science at Leeds Grammar School. Mr Laws held the office until his retirement in 1951.

In 1938 a new girls Grammar School (Thistley Hough School) was opened in the city and all of the girls at Hanley High School transferred to the new school. An annual reunion dance was subsequently held for the upper school pupils.

In 1939 the military authorities commandeered the school, and the pupils were accommodated at Brownhills (Girls) High School, working a double shift system with the girls for a year until new buildings were made ready at Chell.

50 Old Hanliensians lost their lives in the Second World War and their memorial, unveiled in 1948, was placed with that of the First World War in the Library of the school.

=== Extracts from the school log book ===
- 12 June 1924: Prince of Wales visited the Potteries. School assembled in Hanley Park at 2 pm.
- 17 Feb to 3 March 1925: Influenza Epidemic.
- 28 Sept 1929: Mr R J Mitchell visited the School and spoke to the Debating Society.
- 6 Feb 1952: Death of H M King George VI. A short service was held at the school.
- 24 July 1953: End of Term ceremony was the last for the bi-lateral School, prior to the move to new premises in Bucknall.

== Hanley High School : 1953 - 1970 ==
During the 1930s subsidence had been discovered beneath the original school building in Old Hall Street and it was deemed unsafe to be used as a school. After 14 years at Chell, that school became the Chell County Secondary School, and in September 1953 Hanley High School moved into spacious new buildings at Bucknall, which included extensive playing fields and, eventually, tennis courts.

=== Extracts from the school log book ===
- 8 Sep 1953: The new school opened with 589 pupils, almost entirely in uniform, with 62 in the Sixth Form, and 31 staff. All were gathered for a photograph by the press.
- 23 Dec 1953: D J Wilshaw, an Old Hanliensian and a member of staff, was selected to play for the England football team against Wales. He scored two of the winning goals.
- 6 April 1954: The Diamond Jubilee of the School was celebrated at Speech Day in the Victoria Hall, Hanley before 2,000 attendees. Mr Bernard Hollowood, a former Senior Prefect, was The Visitor.
- 29 May 1954: Mr Wilshaw played for England in the World Cup held in Switzerland.
- 26 April 1955: Annual soccer match 1st XI v Old Boys; referee Mr W Wright (England captain), linesmen D Wilshaw (England) and W Shorthouse – all of Wolverhampton Wanderers F.C.
- 1 March 1956: Presentation of a School organ, organised by the Old Hanliensian Club.
- 28 March 1957: Speech Day. The Visitor was Sir Leonard Hutton, former England Cricket Captain.
- Sept 1959: The School welcomed Mr W Barwise MA as the new headteacher. A Lancastrian by birth who graduated in Modern Languages at Manchester University, where he was captain of the 1st XI soccer team as well as the 1st Lawn Tennis team.
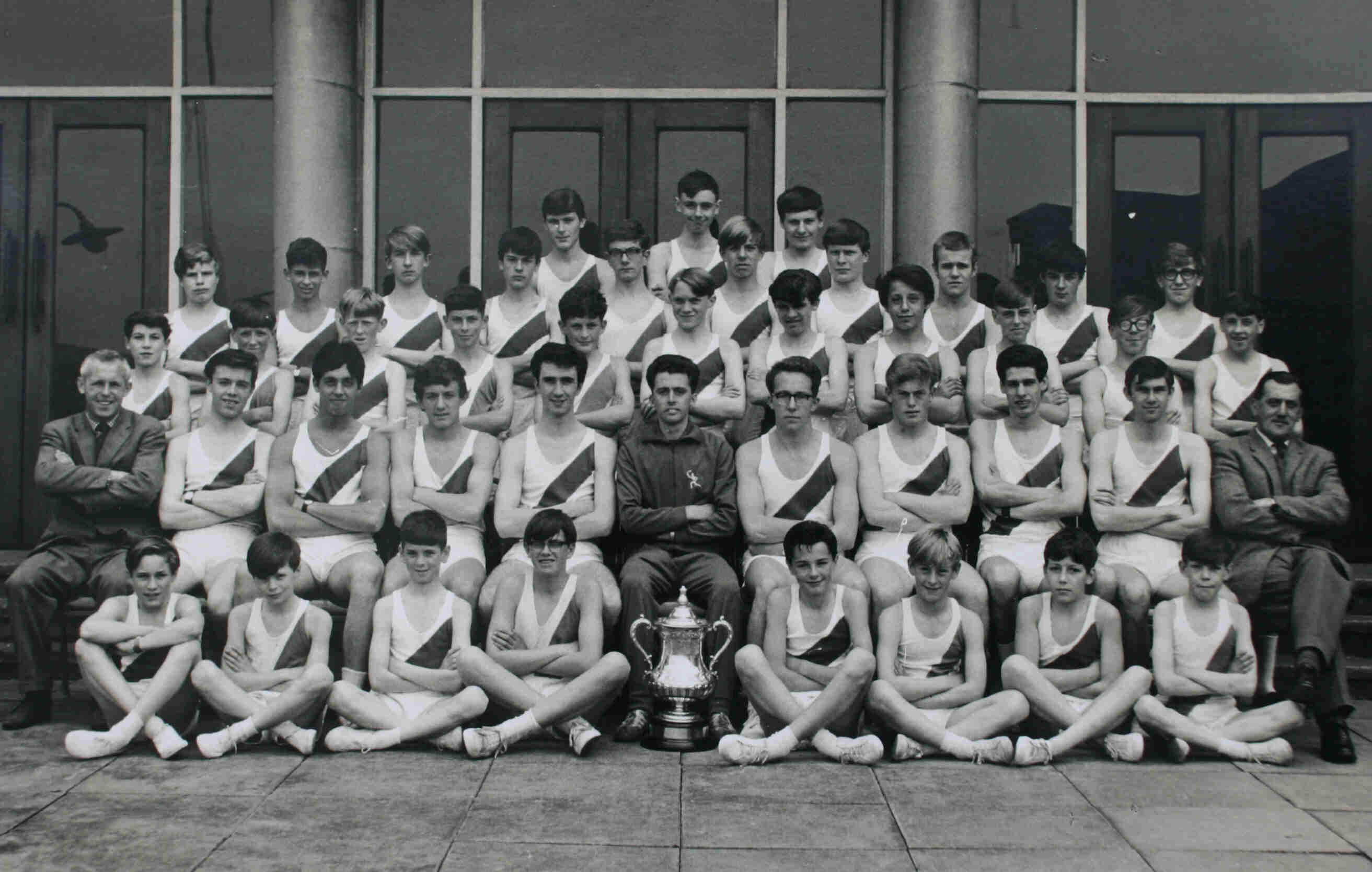
School Athletics Club 1965

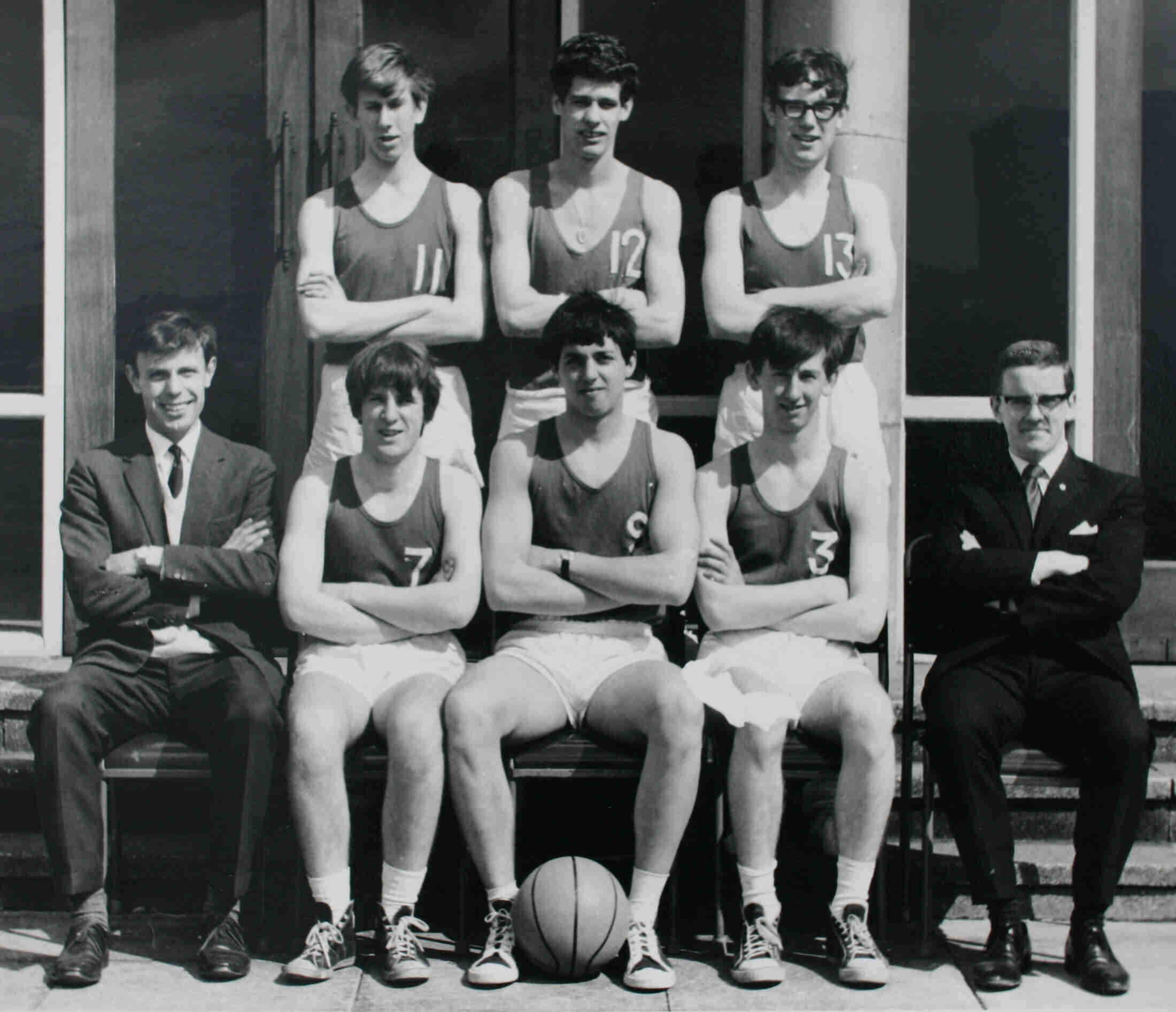
Basketball Team 1965

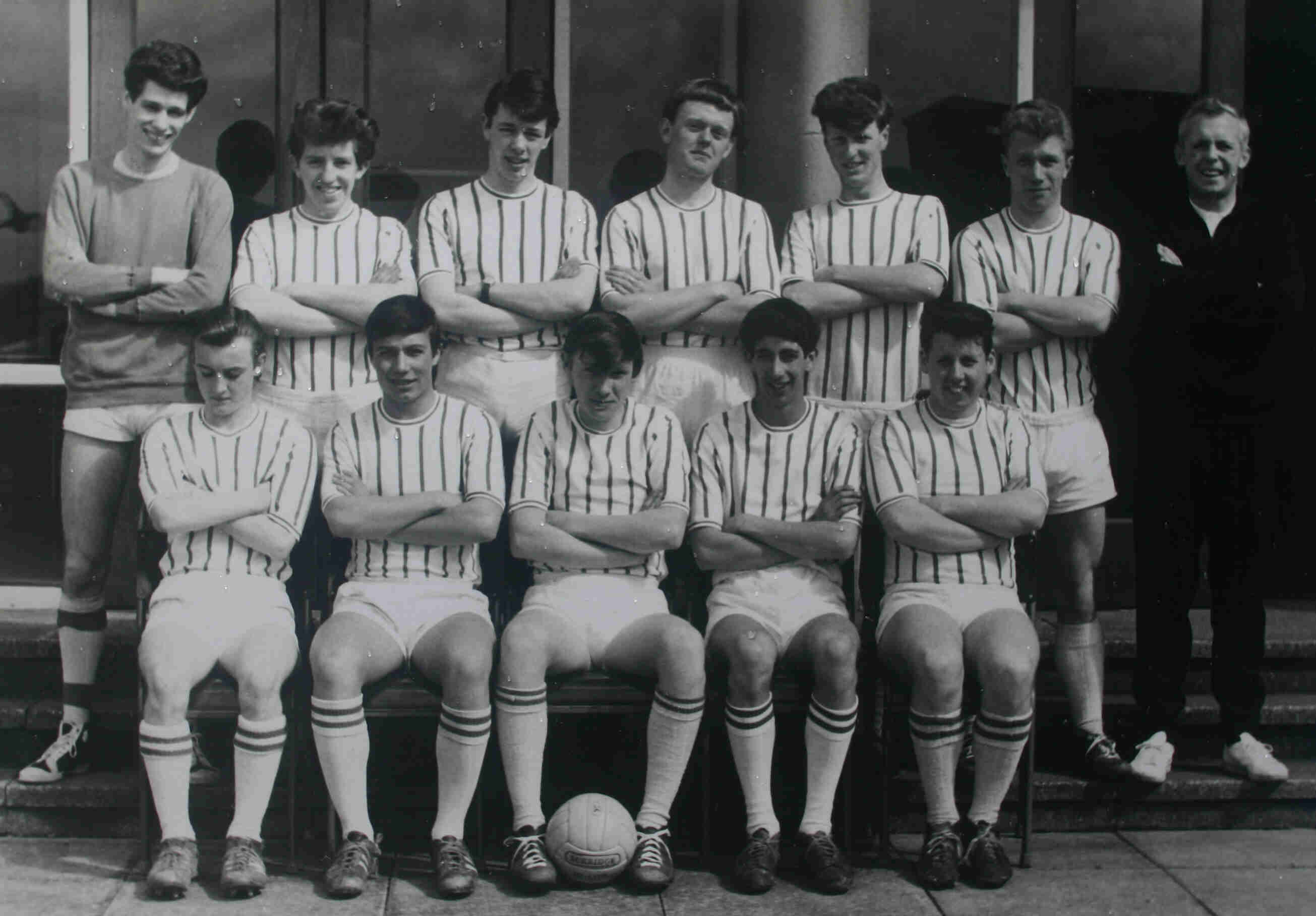
School Soccer Team 1965

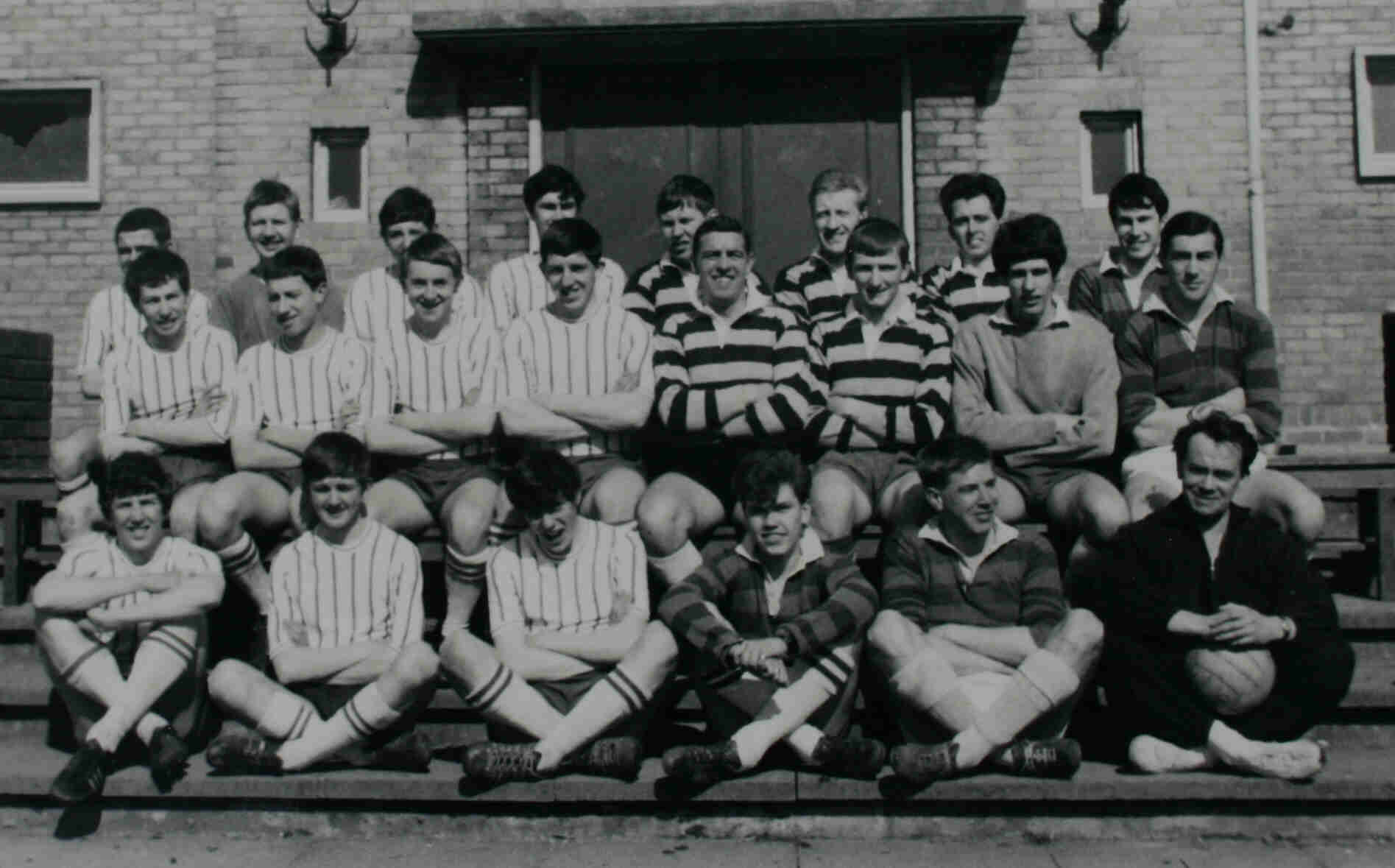
School v Old Hanliensians 1966

=== Extracts from the School magazine: The Hanliensian ===
- 31 March 1960: The Golden Jubilee of the Federation of the Six Towns was marked at the School with the installation of new ornamental gates emblazoned with symbols of the City coat of arms.
- Dec 1965: We regret to record the death of Mr F G Nicholas, a founder member of the Old Hanliesian Club and donor of the Nicholas Essay Prize.

== Hanley High School : 1970 ==
The City Council Education Committee decided in 1970 that the School should have its Sixth Form removed and the remainder of the school become a Comprehensive school, admitting all pupils on a non-selective basis apart from residence.

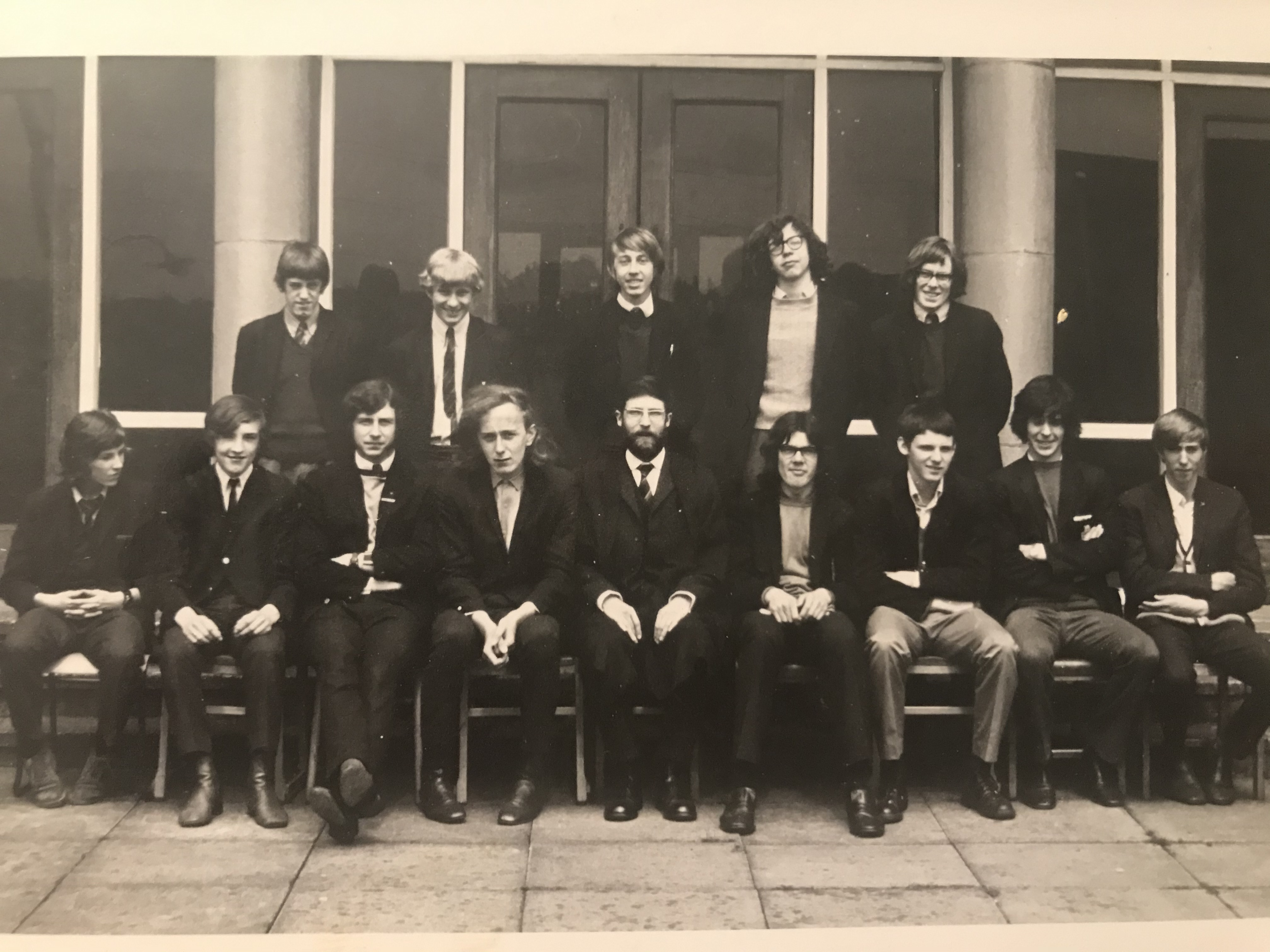
School Literature Club 1970

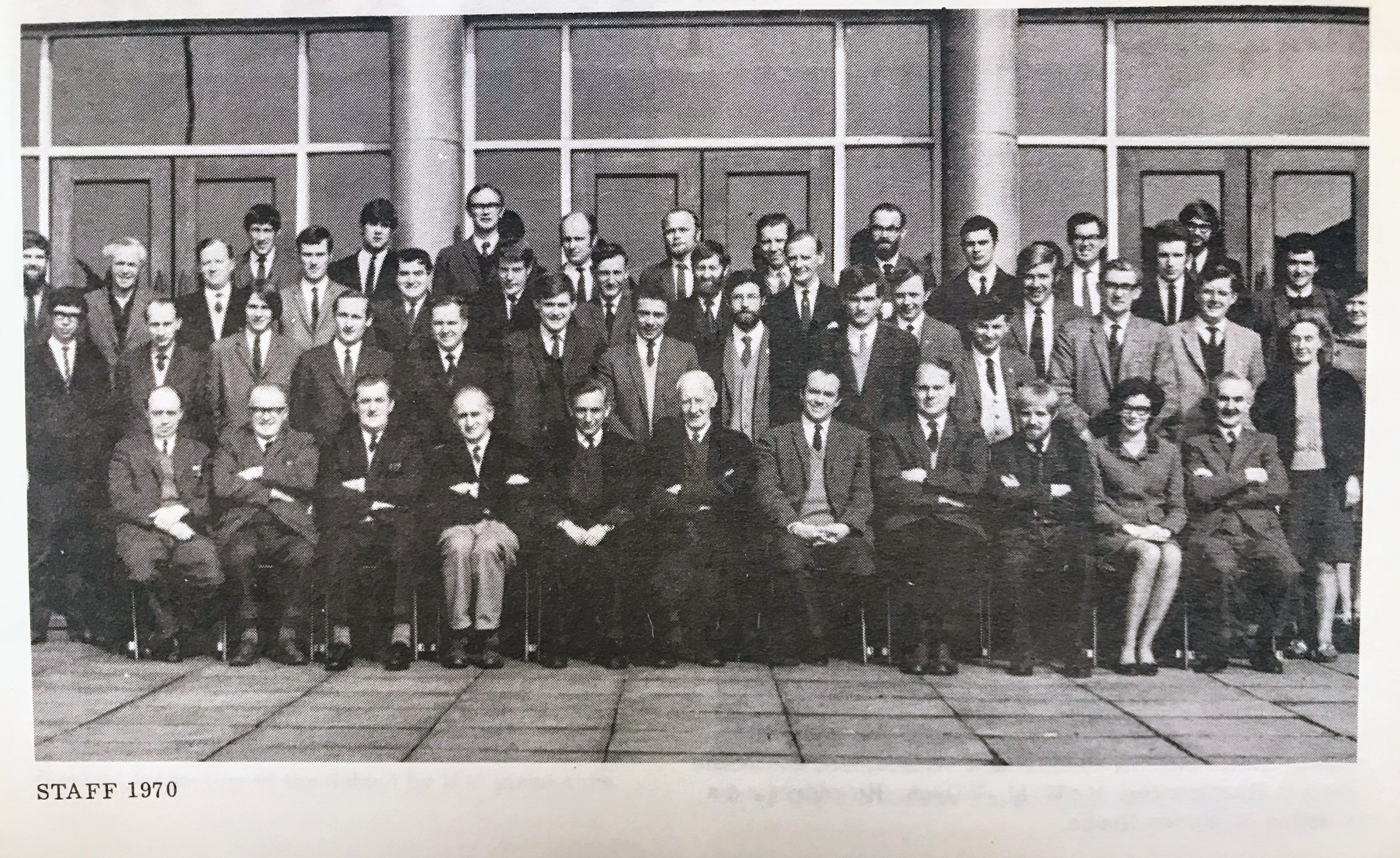
School Staff 1970

== Notable Old Hanliensians and former teachers ==
- Ernest Loney, represented Great Britain at the 1908 London Olympic Games in 1500 metres
- Frank Kearton, chairman of Courtaulds (1931); Chancellor of University of Bath 1980–1992
- Norman Wainwright, British Olympic Swimming team; held the British records for 500, 880 and 1000 yards in 1934
- R. J. Mitchell, aeronautical engineer, designer of the Supermarine Seaplane and the Spitfire
- Ronnie Allen, England footballer (1952–1954), Port Vale, West Bromwich Albion, Crystal Palace
- Dennis Wilshaw, England footballer (1953–1956; 1954 World Cup player), Wolverhampton, Stoke City
- Selwyn Whalley, teacher and footballer (Port Vale 1953–1966)
- Harriet Slater, Labour MP for Stoke-on-Trent North 1953–1966
- Bernard Hollowood, economist and editor of Punch magazine 1957–1972
- Ely Devons, Professor of Economics 1959–1965 at the London School of Economics
- Samuel Devons, Professor of Physics 1960–1985 at Columbia University, New York
- Harold Perkin, Professor of History, Northwestern University, Illinois, 1985–1997
- Michael Bullock, football player for Birmingham City (1962)
- Peter J. K. Gibbs, television script writer, and former cricketer for Derbyshire 1966–1972
- Robert Street, Professor of Physics at Monash University, Australia 1960–1974, and vice-chancellor of the University of Western Australia 1978–1986
- David Wheeler, Professor of Computer Science at University of Cambridge 1978–1994

== Notes ==
Stoke-on-Trent City Archives hold the Records of Hanley High School and subsequent institutions on the school site (1894-2003) Collection Reference Numbers: SD 1568 and SD 1841. This collection includes the records of Hanley Higher Grade Elementary School, Hanley Municipal Secondary School (Hanley High School), Brookhouse High School, Mitchell High School, Carmountside High School and Willfield County Secondary School.
