= Newcastle High School for Girls =

Location
- Tankerville Terrace; Newcastle upon Tyne, NE2 3BA; England; 54°59′3″N 1°36′24″W

Information
- Type: Private day school
- Established: 2014
- Local authority: Newcastle upon Tyne
- Department for Education URN: 108538 Tables
- Head: Amanda Hardie
- Gender: Girls
- Age: 3 to 18
- Enrolment: 970
- Colour: Teal
- Website: http://www.newcastlehigh.gdst.net

Newcastle High School for Girls is a private day school for girls aged 3–18 in Newcastle upon Tyne, England. The Junior School is at Sandyford Park and the Senior School is located in the neighbouring suburb of Jesmond.

The school was formed in September 2014 by the merger of Central Newcastle High School and Newcastle upon Tyne Church High School. It is operated by the Girls' Day School Trust, an organisation which ran one of the predecessor schools, Central Newcastle High, pre-merger.

== History ==
Newcastle High School for Girls was formed by the merger of the predecessor single-sex girls' schools, Church High School and Central Newcastle High School in 2014.

In 1876 when the Girls' Public Day School Trust (GDST) founded Gateshead High School. Mary Moberly became the head teacher in Gateshead in 1891 and she moved to Newcastle in 1895. There had previously been a preparatory school in Newcastle but this was expanded and it was renamed to be the Central Newcastle High School. The GDST school in Gateshead continued until it was merged into Newcastle in 1907. Moberly retired in 1911.

In 1884, The Church Schools' Company decided to open a private girls' school in the North East which focused on a church-based learning environment. A high school for girls in Newcastle was established in 1885 and opened with 59 pupils. A new association was formed in 1925, and the school was renamed The Newcastle upon Tyne Church High School.

In 2016, the school moved to new facilities on Tankerville Terrace which incorporated the former Church High building and a new purpose-built 3,625 square metres (39,020 square feet) three-storey block.

The headmistress responsible for the move to the new facilities, Hilary French was dismissed from her post on 16 June 2018. She was arrested by Northumbria Police on 20 June 2018, interviewed and released pending further enquiries. French was convicted at Newcastle Crown Court of three counts of Fraud and struck off as a teacher on 7 March 2025. She was succeeded by Michael Tippet.

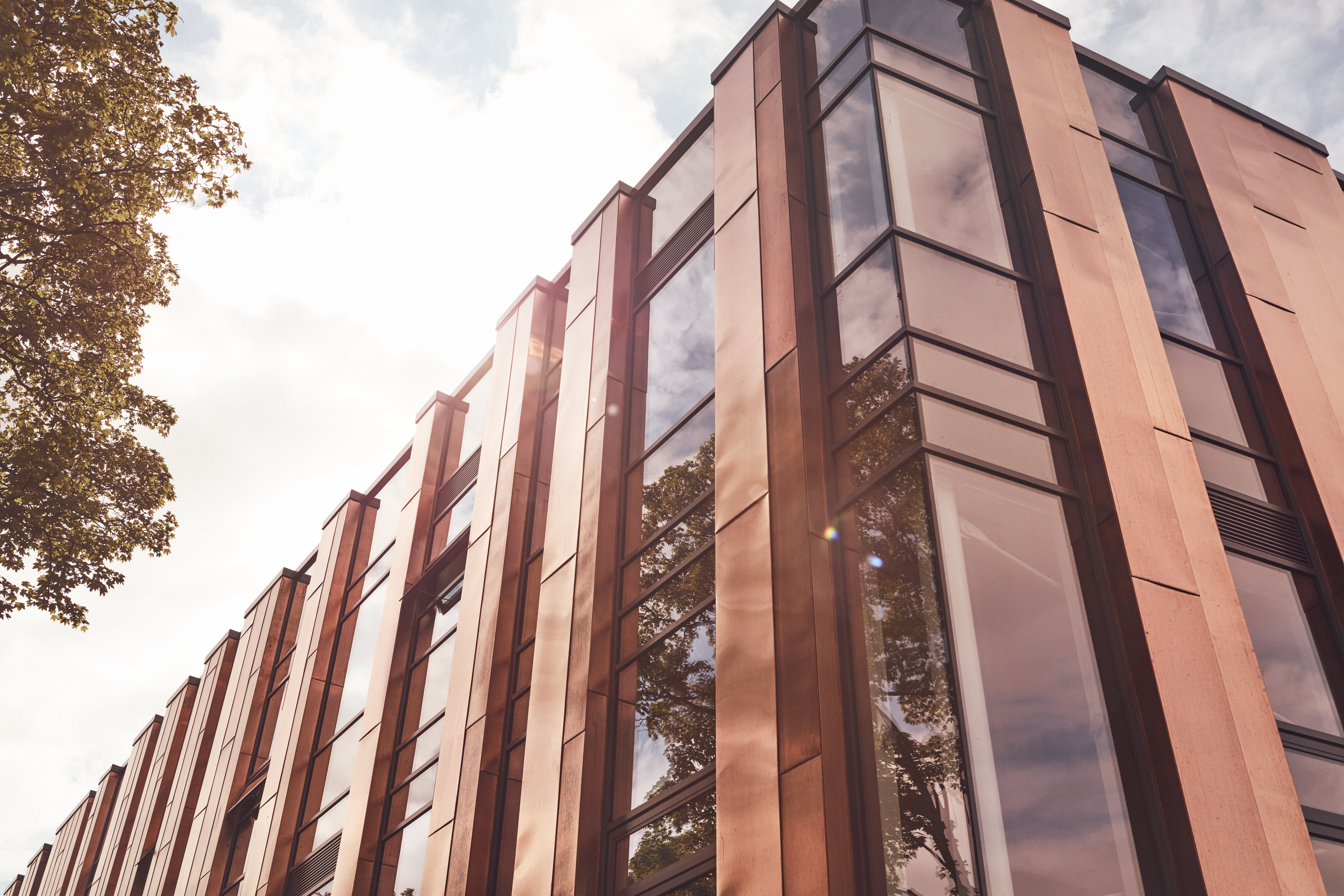
The new facilities on Tankerville Terrace opened in September 2016

== Curriculum ==
Newcastle High School for Girls ranks in the top five independent schools in North East England and top 10 nationally.

== The Prime Minister's Global Fellowship ==
Two Central Newcastle High School students attainined places on the Prime Minister's Global Fellowship programme. The school achieved its first student in the inaugural year of the programme, 2008, and in 2009 had another successful applicant.

== Notable former pupils ==
- Andrea Riseborough (born 1981), actress (educated at Newcastle upon Tyne Church High School)
- Lucy Akhurst (born 1975), actress, writer and director. (educated at Newcastle upon Tyne Church High School)
- Ruth Caleb (born 1942), film and television producer. (educated at Newcastle upon Tyne Church High School)
- Angela Milner, (died 2021) Assistant Keeper of Paleontology, Natural History Museum, London (educated at Newcastle upon Tyne Church High School)
- Ursula Dronke (1920–2012), Medievalist and Professor of Old Norse Studies (educated at Newcastle upon Tyne Church High School)
- Dame Irene Ward, (1895–1980), British politician. (educated at Newcastle upon Tyne Church High School)
- Ann McMullan (1923–2006), director of the Electrical Association for Women (educated at Newcastle upon Tyne Church High School)
- Esther McCracken (1902–1971), playwright and actress
- Miriam Stoppard (born 1937), doctor and author
- Laila Zaidi (born 1993), actress
- L Devine, Singer

== Other sources ==
- A.C. and F.M., The Newcastle upon Tyne Church High School Jubilee History 1885-1935, Andrew Reid & Company Limited, 1935.
- Helen G. Scott & Elizabeth A. Wise, The Centenary Book of the Newcastle upon Tyne Church High School 1885-1985, 1985.
- Carter, Oliver; Girls' Public Day School Trust (1955). History of Gateshead High School 1876–1907 and Central Newcastle High School 1895–1955. G.F. Laybourne.
- 2007 ISI Inspection Report
