= Liz Bird =

British academic (1945–2021)

Liz Bird MBE
- Born: Elizabeth Bird; 1945
- Died: October 2021 (aged 75–76)

Academic background
- Education: University of Oxford

Elizabeth Bird MBE (1945 – October 2021) was a British academic. She was head of continuing education at the University of Bristol, and then dean of arts. She was a co-founder member of the Bristol Women's Studies Group. Bird co-edited the book, Half the Sky: An Introduction to Women’s Studies. She was a printmaker with Spike Print Studio.

== Life ==
Elizabeth Bird was born in 1945 in Gateshead, the daughter of barrister Sybil and Robert Bird, the managing director of a family laundry. She was head girl of Newcastle upon Tyne Church High School, and studied briefly at the University of Perugia before going up to Oxford to philosophy, politics and economics. She then earned a Master of Arts at Sussex University.

Bird spent a year at Cornell University, before completing a DPhil at Sussex, followed by a research assistantship at Glasgow. She began at Bristol University in 1976, teaching extramural studies and then as head of continuing education. When the continuing education department closed in 1998, Bird became part of drama and theatre studies, and was dean of arts. She retired in 2004.

Bird was a co-founder member of the Bristol Women's Studies Group, and led the development of a master's course in gender and social policy. She co-edited the book, Half the Sky:An Introduction to Women’s Studies, published by Virago in 1976, "which pioneered women's studies in Britain".

Bird was also a printmaker with Spike Print Studio. She died from cancer in October 2021 aged 76. She was survived by her husband and son.

== Works ==
- Half the Sky: An Introduction to Women’s Studies ( 1979)
- "Women's studies and the women's movement in Britain: origins and evolution, 1970–2000", Women's History Review, ISSN: 0961-2025
