= Graham Laidler =

British cartoonist (1908–1940)

Graham Laidler (4 July 1908 – 23 November 1940) was a British cartoonist, noted for his work in Punch magazine in the 1930s. He signed his name as "pont", short for a nickname, Pontifex Maximus.

== Life ==
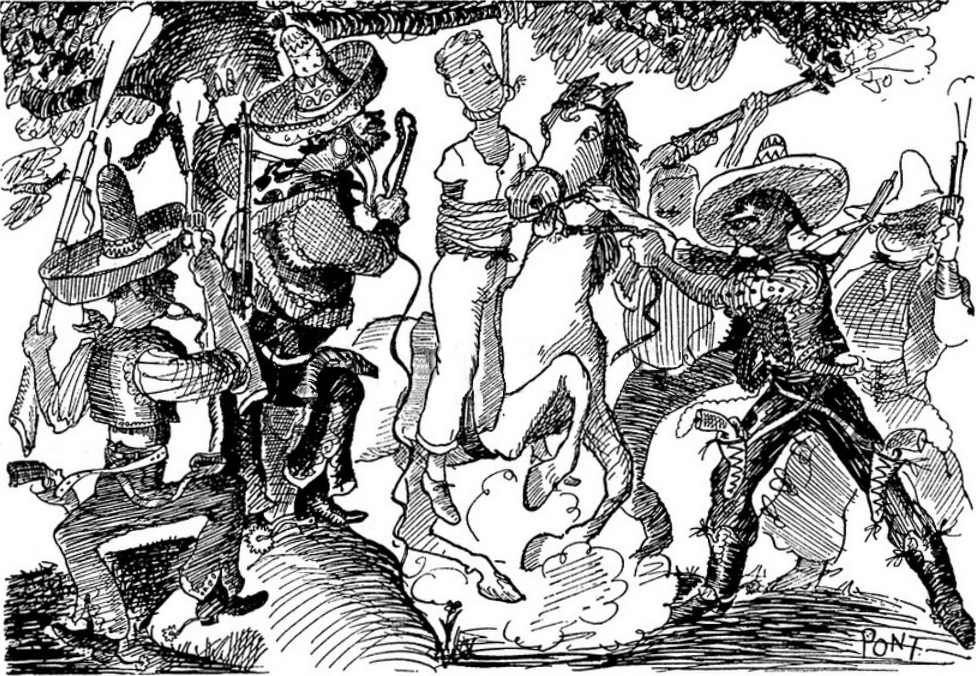
The British Character. Calm when faced by adversity. Cartoon in Punch, 4 July 1934

Laidler was born on 4 July 1908 in Newcastle upon Tyne, England at 6 Osborne Avenue, Jesmond. His father, George Gavin Laidler, owner of a painting and decorating business, died when Laidler was 13 and his mother, Kathleen née Crosby, eventually the family moved south, finally settling in Jordans in Buckinghamshire. Laidler had always hoped to become a cartoonist but, to ensure an income that would adequately support himself and his widowed mother, he enrolled at the London School of Architecture in 1926. After being diagnosed with tuberculosis in 1932, he was unable to continue with an office-based career and started to concentrate on his cartoons. He lived in Austria for some time for his health in the 1930s, returning to Britain following the Anschluss in 1938.

From 1930 to 1936 he published a weekly strip The Twiffs, in the magazine Woman's Pictorial. In August 1932 he had his first acceptance from Punch; by 1937 he was so popular that the editor, E. V. Knox, is understood to have made an almost unprecedented 'gentlemen's' agreement' with him to take all his drawings if Laidler would undertake to draw only for Punch - possibly a bid to make sure he was not poached by Graham Greene's new magazine Night and Day.

Under the name 'Pont' (derived from a nickname – Pontifex Maximus – he acquired during a visit to Rome), Laidler became one of the most original talents in the history of Punch and his work continues to inspire cartoonists to this day. He is perhaps most famous for his series on the British Character. This was published as a book in 1938. Another book The British Carry On (1940) portrayed the atmosphere of the Phoney War. A famous example shows a placid scene in a country pub, where the radio is tuned to the German propaganda station: 'Meanwhile, in Britain, the entire population, faced by the threat of an invasion, has been flung into a state of complete panic'. 'At Home', and 'Popular Misconceptions' were also successful series, but by the end of his brief career he was also developing a striking new approach, moving away from the detailed, large drawings to economical, one or two figure sketches with pithy captions.

Laidler never married. He died of poliomyelitis on 23 November 1940, having contracted it while evacuating refugees from London in his car.

Laidler completed four hundred cartoons in his brief career, enough to furnish the material for five books. Bernard Hollowood, fellow cartoonist and later editor of Punch wrote a biographical account of his life and work in his book Pont (1969). A further biography was written by Laidler's cousin, Ann McMullan MBE and published on Kindle in 2022.

== Legacy ==
An annual Pont Award is given by the Cartoon Art Trust to a cartoonist "for drawing the British Character".

== Bibliography ==
- The British Character (1938); republished 1982 by Element Books Ltd. with introduction by Alan Coren annotated "Reprinted many times" ISBN 0 906540 23 2.
- The British at Home (1939), with an appreciation by T.H. White
- The British Carry On (1940)
- Pont (1942), with an introduction by Fougasse
- Most of Us are Absurd (1946)
- Pont: an account of the life and work of Graham Laidler (1908-1940), the great Punch artist (1969), by Bernard Hollowood
