= Jesmond =

Suburb of Newcastle upon Tyne, England

Coordinates: 54°58′58″N 1°36′14″W

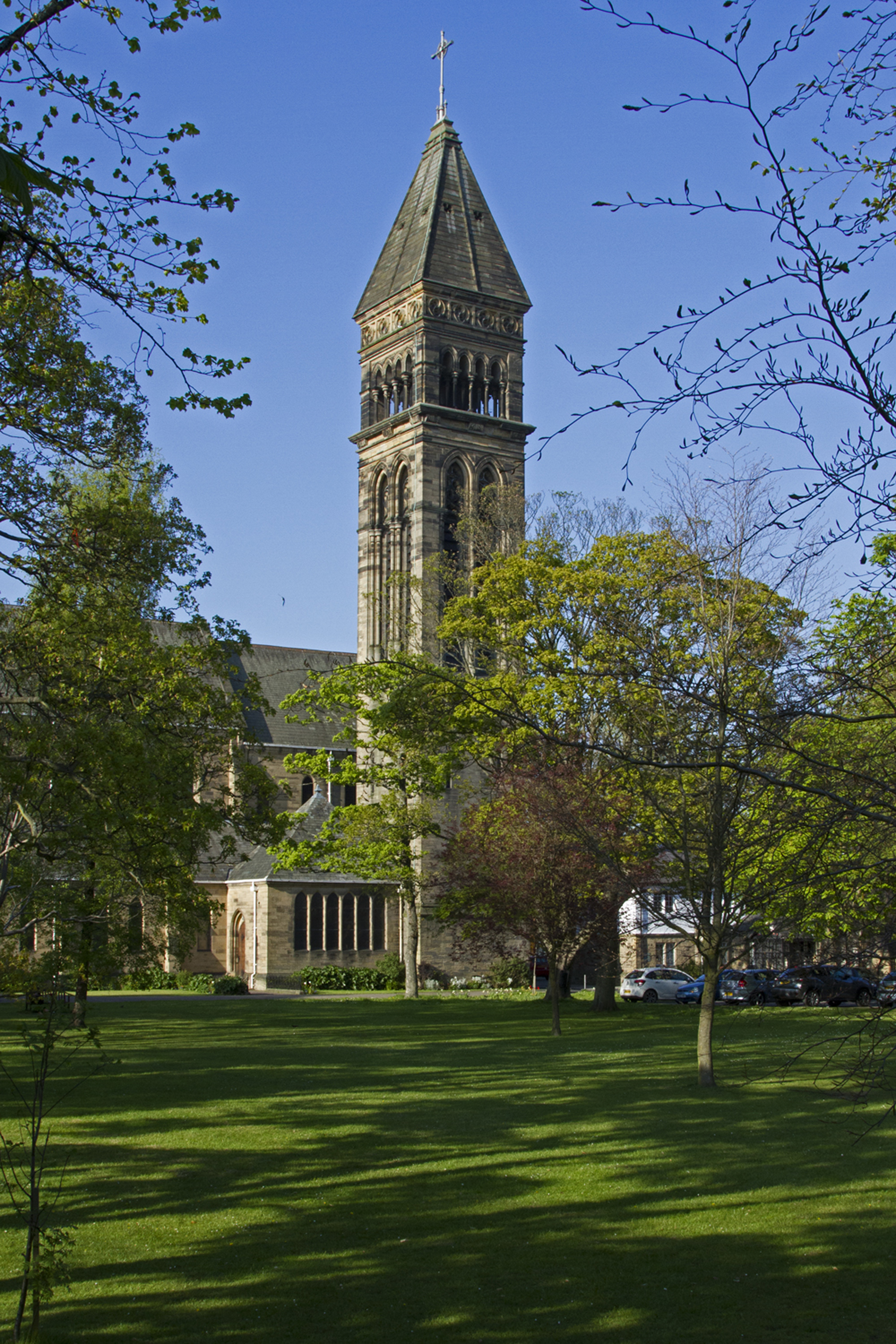
- St George's Church, Jesmond

- Location within Tyne and Wear
- OS grid reference: NZ253654
  - London: 242 miles (389 km)
- Metropolitan borough: Newcastle upon Tyne
- Metropolitan county: Tyne and Wear
- Region: North East
- Country: England
- Sovereign state: United Kingdom
- Post town: NEWCASTLE UPON TYNE
- Postcode district: NE2
- Dialling code: 0191
- Police: Northumbria
- Fire: Tyne and Wear
- Ambulance: North East
- UK Parliament: Newcastle upon Tyne East
- Councillors: North Jesmond Wendy Young (Labour) Stella Postlethwaite (Labour) Gerry Keating (Liberal Democrats); South Jesmond Lesley Storey (Labour) Felicity Mendelson (Labour) Arlene Ainsley (Labour)

Jesmond (/ˈdʒɛzmənd/ JEZ-mənd) is a suburb of Newcastle upon Tyne, Tyne and Wear, England, situated north of the city centre and to the east of the Town Moor. Jesmond is considered to be one of the most affluent suburbs of Newcastle upon Tyne, with higher average house prices than most other areas of the city.

== History ==
According to local tradition, some time shortly after the Norman conquest there occurred in the valley of the Ouse an apparition of the Blessed Virgin Mary. The ruins of St Mary's Chapel, first recorded in 1272, are in Jesmond Dene on the west side of the valley.

A trace of the processions to the shrine which occurred during the Middle Ages is found in the name of that section of the former Great North Road running north of the Tyne called Pilgrim Street. During a period in which the shrine was in need of repair it was endowed with indulgences by a rescript or edict of Pope Martin V on certain feasts of the liturgical year. A spring known as St Mary's Well of uncertain date may also be found near to the chapel. It has the word "Gratia" inscribed upon the stone above it. The greater part of the history of the shrine, its origins and the miracles which were said to have occurred there, were lost in the 16th century when the chapel was suppressed in the Reformation and fell into ruin. The ruin and its grounds later passed through various owners (one of whom tried to turn the well into a bathing pool). It was acquired by Lord Armstrong in the 19th century and given by him to the City of Newcastle. Mass is now offered there on occasion by the local Roman Catholic priest and the Roman Catholic Bishop of Hexham and Newcastle. Flowers along with letters and candles are often left in the ruins by pilgrims and others. A booklet outlining the surviving history of the chapel may be obtained from the Roman Catholic Church of the Holy Name on North Jesmond Avenue.

The Municipal Corporations Act 1835 established Newcastle City Council and extended the boundaries of the city to include Elswick, Westgate, Jesmond, Heaton and Byker

The Beatles began writing their second hit single "She Loves You" in the Imperial Hotel in Jesmond, Newcastle upon Tyne on 27 June 1963.

In 1911, the civil parish had a population of 21,367. On 1 April 1914, the parish was abolished to form Newcastle upon Tyne. In 1974, it became part of the metropolitan district of Newcastle upon Tyne.

== Areas of Jesmond ==
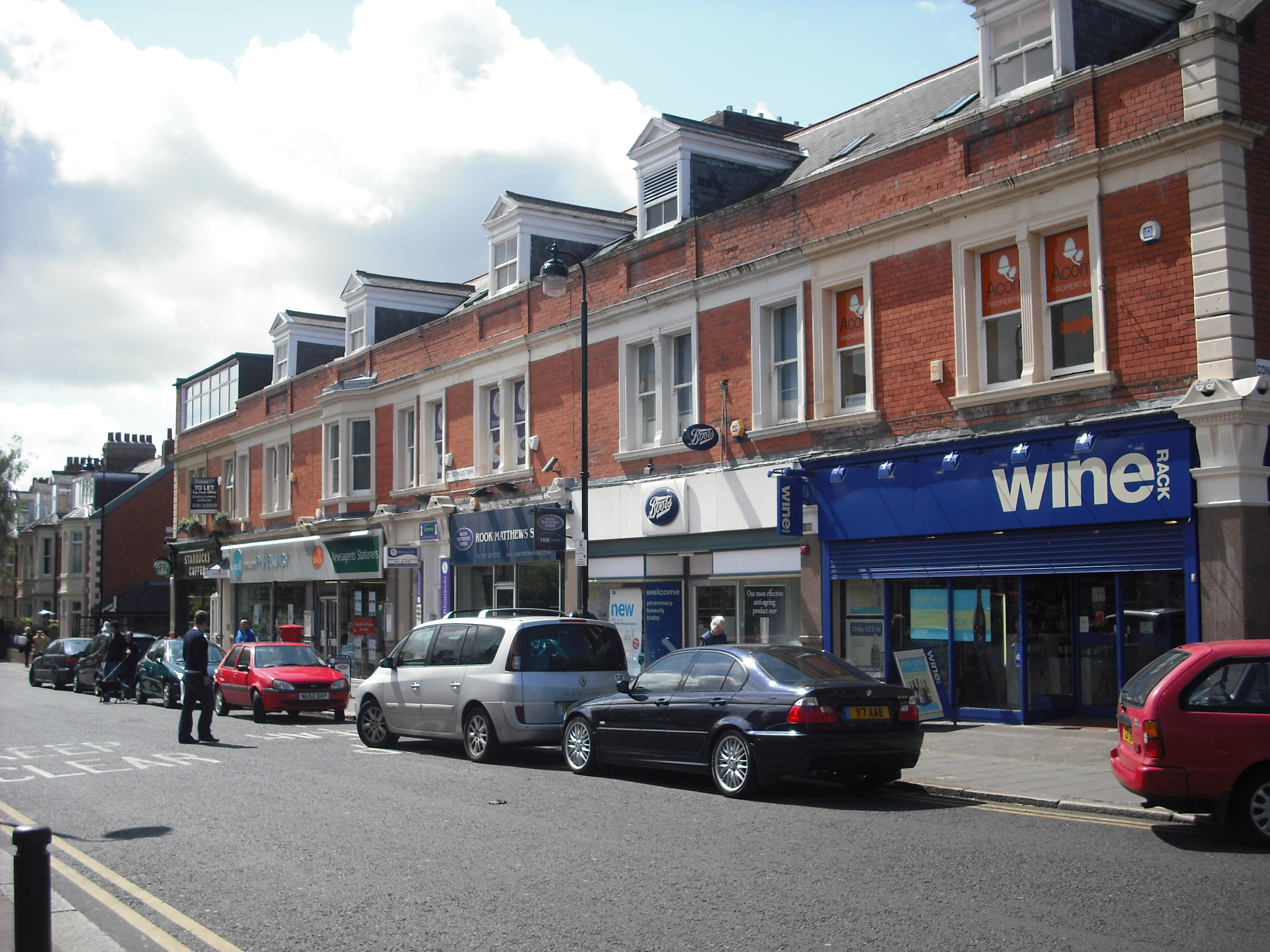
St George's Terrace, in Jesmond's commercial area

The area is notable for Jesmond Parish Church, Holy Trinity Church, Jesmond Dene woodland and the Royal Grammar School. The area's principal commercial area forms around Osborne Road, Acorn Road and St George's Terrace, the former being dominated by hotels and bars, and the latter by shops and cafes.

Newcastle City Council has designated three conservation areas within Jesmond; Brandling Village, South Jesmond and Jesmond Dene.

The Mansion House was owned by a wealthy industrialist Arthur Sutherland, 1st Baronet, and is one of the most impressive residential properties in Jesmond. Built in 1887, the property was donated to the city by Sutherland in 1953 and is now the official residence of the Lord Mayor and can be used for private events. The house, situated in the centre of Jesmond previously sat in five acres (two hectares) of land. One acre (0.40 hectares) of the land including previous stables were sold as a private property, now owned by relatives of Arthur Sutherland.

Along with Leeds and Belfast, Newcastle has experienced studentification. Jesmond is a popular residential area for students attending Newcastle University and Northumbria University. Osborne Road in Jesmond has a strong student population with a selection of student bars, restaurants and housing.

Newcastle Cricket Club plays its home games at Osborne Avenue, which is also a home venue for Northumberland County Cricket Club. The cricket club is currently on a 50-year lease to Newcastle Royal Grammar School. The Jesmond Lawn Tennis club is also popular for socialising.

Jesmond is one of the 26 areas in England to have a real tennis club which is used to hold events.

== Notable people ==
Notable Jesmond residents include:

- Elva Lorence (Florence Eva Simpson), (1865–1923) composer and writer, lived at 7 Fern Road Jesmond.
- The industrialist William Armstrong,
- Several members of the 19th century industrialist dynasty the Hawks family,
- The golfer Lee Westwood,
- Philosopher Ludwig Wittgenstein,
- Actor James Scott
- English Rugby Union player Mathew Tait
- Footballers Shola Ameobi, Kevin Nolan and Jonás Gutiérrez
- Journalist and broadcaster Nancy Spain,
- Concert pianist Denis Matthews
- Writer Catherine Cookson,
- Writer and poet Michael Roberts
- Singers Bryan Ferry and Sting,
- Countertenor James Bowman
- TV/Radio broadcaster Bill Steel
- Songwriter and record producer Steve Hillier,
- Novelists Eva Ibbotson,
- Yevgeny Zamyatin
- Denis MacEoin (aka Daniel Easterman and Jonathan Aycliffe).
- Arthur Sutherland 1st Baronet; former owner of the Mansion House.
- John Dewhirst, was born in Jesmond.

== Jesmond schools ==
=== Primary schools ===
- West Jesmond Primary School

West Jesmond is a 4-11 primary school. The original building was demolished in 2008 and a new school rebuilt on the same site. The new school building opened on 2 March 2009.

=== Independent schools ===
- Royal Grammar School, Newcastle
- Central Newcastle High School (girls only) – merged into new school
- Church High School (girls only) – merged into new school
- Central Newcastle High School and Church High School merged in September 2014 to create Newcastle High School for Girls
- Northern Counties School
- Newcastle Preparatory School

== Notable buildings ==
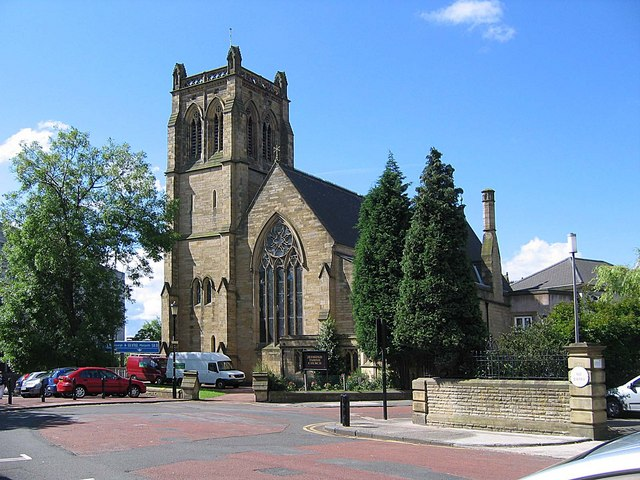
Jesmond Parish Church, Newcastle upon Tyne

- Jesmond Synagogue
- Jesmond Parish Church
- Jesmond Library
- Fernwood House

== Television ==
For its first series, the MTV UK reality series Geordie Shore was filmed in Jesmond.

The La Sagesse School in Jesmond (now closed and converted into housing) was used as a set for The Dumping Ground (2013–), a spin-off of the popular children's television series Tracy Beaker Returns (2010–2012), starring Dani Harmer.

== Metro stations ==
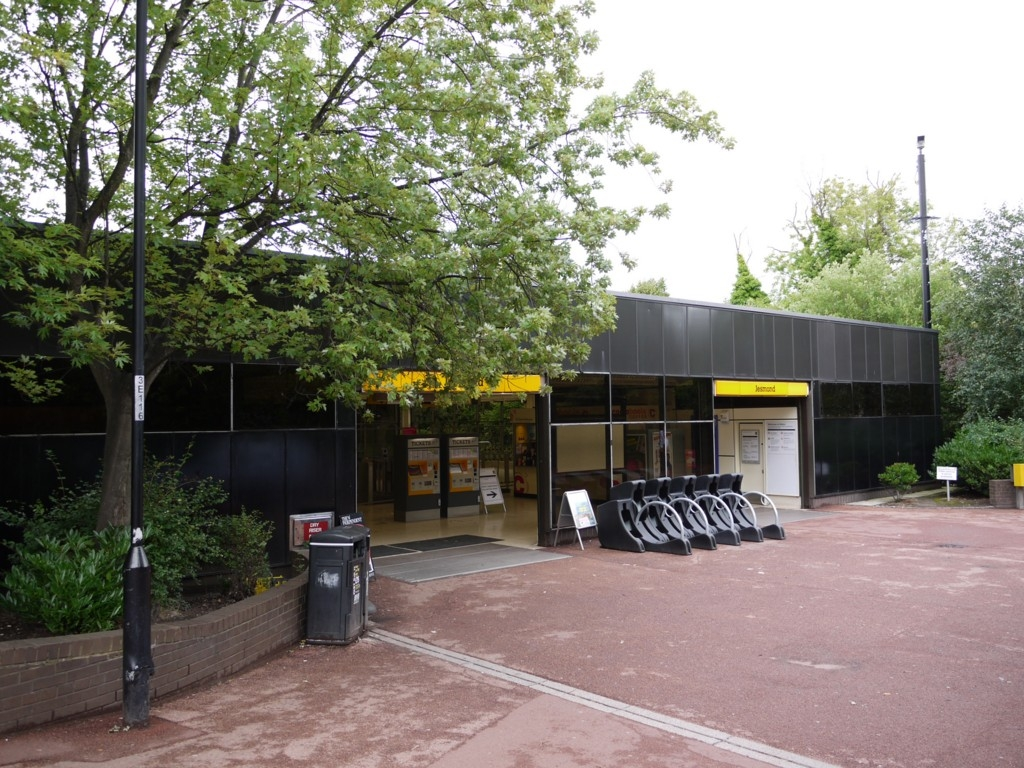
Entrance to the Jesmond Metro station

Jesmond is served by three Tyne and Wear Metro stations at Jesmond, West Jesmond and Ilford Road. Jesmond station is the point at which Metro trains travelling north emerge from the underground section. Trains travel southbound to Sunderland or South Shields via city centre and Gateshead and northbound to the airport via Kingston Park, or to Whitley Bay. Jesmond also has an extra section of non-passenger track called the Manors Stock Curve, used for re-routing trains. The old Jesmond station, which formed part of the suburban rail network prior to the Tyne and Wear Metro network, is situated on the Manors Stock Curve and can be observed from Osborne Terrace with intact platforms. The former station building is now a public house.

== Religion ==
There has been an active Baháʼí Faith community in Jesmond for over 25 years, the town is home to the only Bahá’í Centre in North East England, located on Victoria Square near the civic centre.

One of the largest evangelical Anglican churches in the UK is Jesmond Parish Church, which is affiliated with the Christian Institute (based in nearby Gosforth).

== Nightlife ==
Due to a rising population of students and young professionals, Osborne Road has in recent years become a popular venue for nightlife, eating and socialising. With a large number of bars and restaurants in one location it can become congested on busy nights. The road also has a number of medium-sized hotels.

== Sources ==
- Charleton, Robert John (1899). A History of Newcastle upon Tyne from the earliest records to its formation as a city. London: Walter Scott Ltd.
- Colls, Robert; Lancaster, Bill (2001). Newcastle upon Tyne. A Modern History. Chichester: Phillimore & Co Ltd. ISBN 1-86077-167-X.
