= Fernwood House =

Building in Newcastle upon Tyne, UK

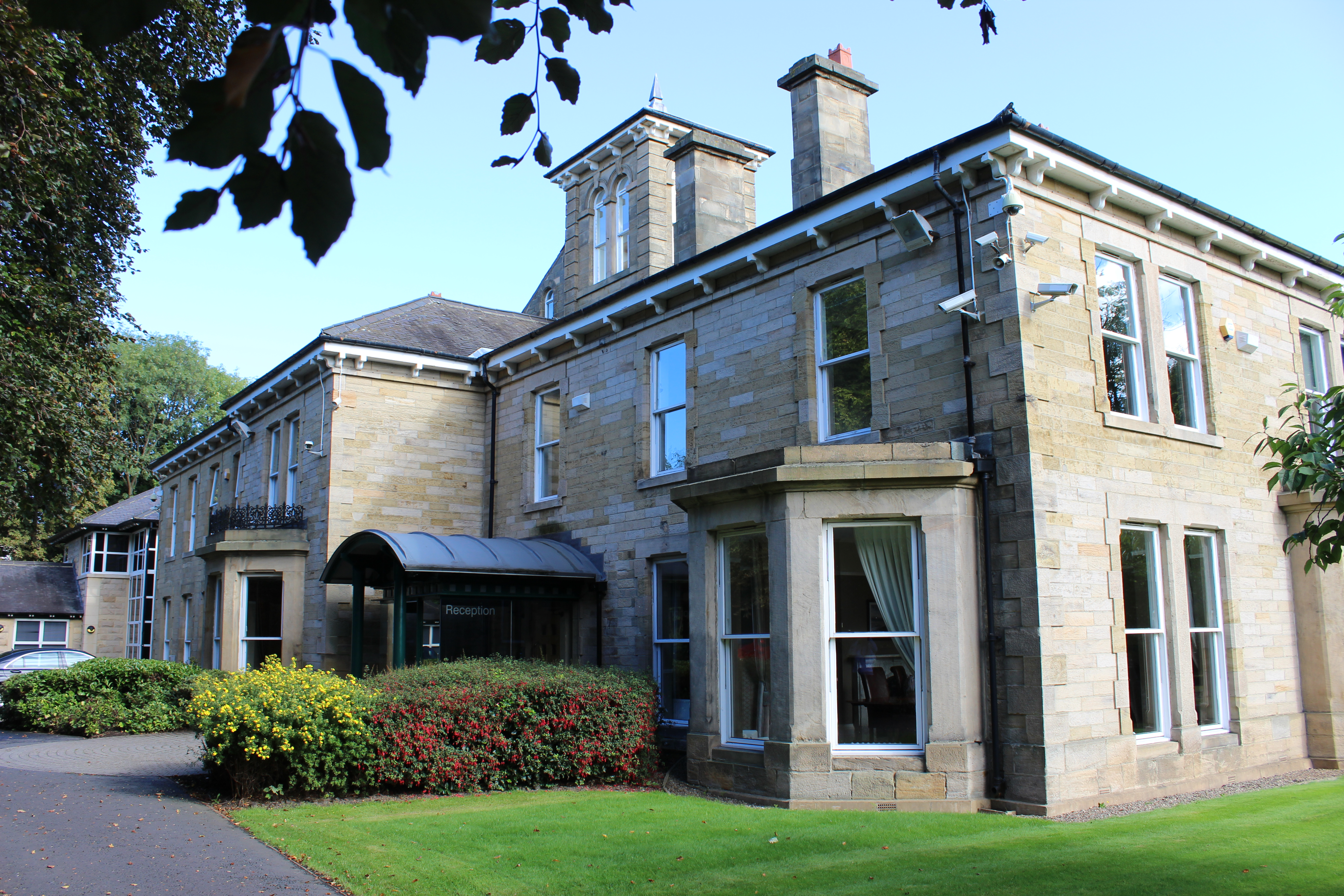

- Location within Tyne and Wear

General information
- Architectural style: Italianate Villa
- Location: Tyne and Wear, England
- Coordinates: 54.9829°N 1.6038°W
- Owner: Lowes Group of Companies www.lowes.co.uk

Fernwood House is a Victorian building, located in Newcastle upon Tyne, United Kingdom. The building is located on Clayton Road in Jesmond and was commissioned in 1864 by James Stoddard. Construction of Fernwood House was completed in February 1865. Shortly after its completion, it was sold to tea dealer, William Stewart. Stewart served as the Sheriff of Newcastle upon Tyne between 1876 and 1877, while living in the house.

Walter Runciman and his wife Anne Margaret Runciman bought Fernwood House in 1893, where Runciman served as MP for Hartlepool. He was also the owner of one of the largest shipbuilding firms in the area, which spun out to create several shipping companies, including Anchor Line.

It served as a private maternity hospital between the 1930s and 1960s. In the 1960s, it was purchased by Newcastle City Council and was used as a Children's home in 1966 until 1991. and reception centre until 1991.

In 1992, the property again entered private ownership when it was purchased by Greggs and used as their head office. Fernwood House was then sold to Lowes Financial Management in 2016, who are part of the Lowes Group.

== History ==
=== Land ownership (1700s–1863) ===
The history of the building dates back to when Jesmond was a township in the 1800s. It also had Jesmond Colliery nearby, but was fields and woodland until the land was developed and properties were built in the 1850s. The land on which it was built, was formerly owned by the Warwick family, who also owned Warwick Hall. The land was sold to the Archbold family in 1821, following the bankruptcy of Robert Warwick, the owner of the Warwick estate. The sale to the Archbold family came as the Warwick estate was broken up and sold off to different buyers. A number of Archbolds owned the land, before James Archbold Pears began to develop the land. Pears was the son of the noble family who owned Fenham Hall near Newcastle upon Tyne at the time.

=== Construction and early residents (1864–1937) ===
After James Archbold Pears inherited the estate, he disposed of some of the land so that it could be developed. This included the land where Fernwood House is now situated. The construction of the building took place in 1864, when a number of properties and roads were established in the area. This included the development of Clayton Road, which the house and many similar style Victorian buildings are now situated in Jesmond, Newcastle upon Tyne.

The house was built by James Stoddard after he acquired the land. Stoddard worked in London as the owner of the James Stoddard & Company and also the Imperial Chinese Tea Company. After the property had been completed, it was sold to the tea dealer William Stewart, who was originally from Newcastle. He and his family resided in Fernwood House from 1865 until 1893. Stewart purchased the property for £1,200, with the aid of a 94% mortgage from Newcastle Permanent Building Society.

In 1876, while living at Fernwood House, Stewart became the Sheriff of Newcastle between 1876 and 1877. Once he had finished serving as Sheriff, Stewart substantially extended the property in 1877. The building's significance locally led it to be referenced in an article by Holliday Bickerstaffe Kendall, part of his Preachers of Thirty Years Ago series. The article refers to the viewing of the Leonid meteor shower that took place in 1866.

The ownership of Fernwood House changed again in 1893 after the death of William Stewart. Stewart's widow and son sold Fernwood House to Walter Runciman and his wife Anne Margaret Runciman. He was the owner of the South Shields Shipping Company, which later became Moor Line and Anchor Line. Runciman was the second largest ship builder in Newcastle at the time, second to James Knott’s Prince Line. He served as Liberal MP for Hartlepool from 1914 to 1918. Walter Runciman died in 1937 at Fernwood House, with the estate valued at £286,431.

=== Maternity hospital and Newcastle City Council (1937–1991) ===
Following the death of Walter Runciman in 1937, Fernwood House was then transformed into a maternity hospital. Dr. Henry Harvey Evers, was the doctor who purchased the building in order to turn it into a leading private maternity hospital in the north east of England. Evers subsequently purchased the neighbouring Oakwood House, which he used as his personal residence.

During this period, Fernwood House was more commonly known as Fernwood House Maternity Hospital. While it remained as a private hospital throughout, many complicated births were treated in the hospital for people in the surrounding area. In 1945, George Orwell’s wife Eileen Blair, was admitted to the Fernwood House Maternity Hospital and underwent a hysterectomy whilst her husband was in Paris reporting on the closing stages of World War II. Eileen Blair died while under general anesthetic in the hospital. She was buried in nearby Jesmond Cemetery. Other notable births at the hospital included the founder of Greggs, John Gregg and also two senior figures of Lowes Financial Management.

In 1964, the maternity hospital closed its doors and was sold to Newcastle City Council. Fernwood House was again renamed Fernwood House Reception Centre and would act as a replacement for the facility in the centre of Newcastle.

The building went under an extensive refurbishment between 1964 and 1966 and reopened in May 1966. A number of distressed children passed through the facility in the 25 years it was open. The most notable was Mary Bell, who was a resident at the property in December 1968, while she underwent an 11-day trial, which saw her convicted of the manslaughter of two young boys. The Fernwood House Reception Centre closed in 1991.

=== Corporate ownership (1992–present) ===
Following the closure of Fernwood House as a reception centre, it was purchased by Greggs and used as their headquarters. The building was extensively altered to create a main entrance directly off Clayton Road, while also expanding the car park and landscaping the gardens. Prior to this change, the main entrance was located on the building close to Oakwood House and Denewood House. Several expansions took place in 1997, 2002 and in 2004. The expansions focused on the rear of the property, incorporating a stableman's cottage and taking down several outhouses. Many of the smaller buildings had stood since the early 20th century.

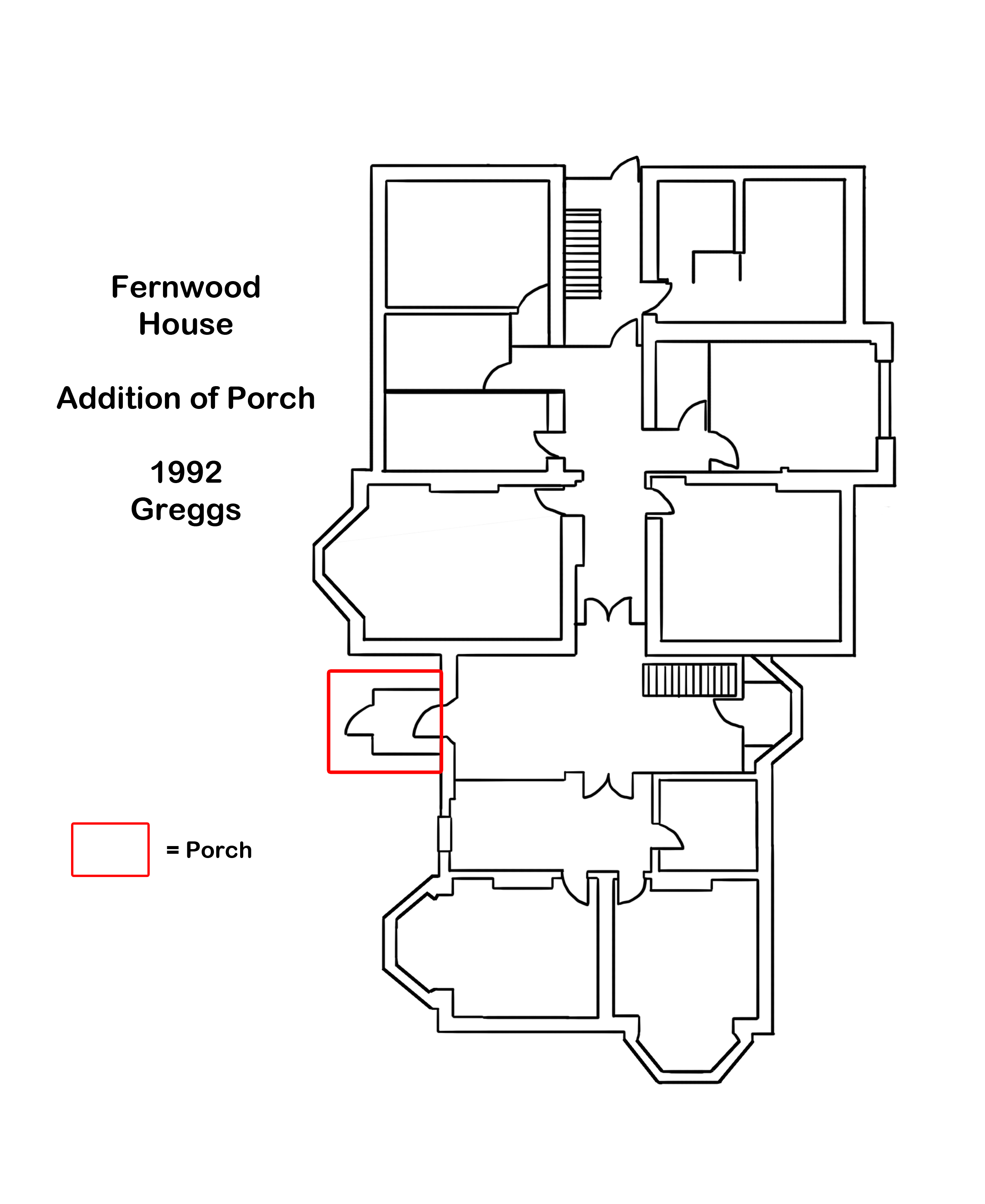

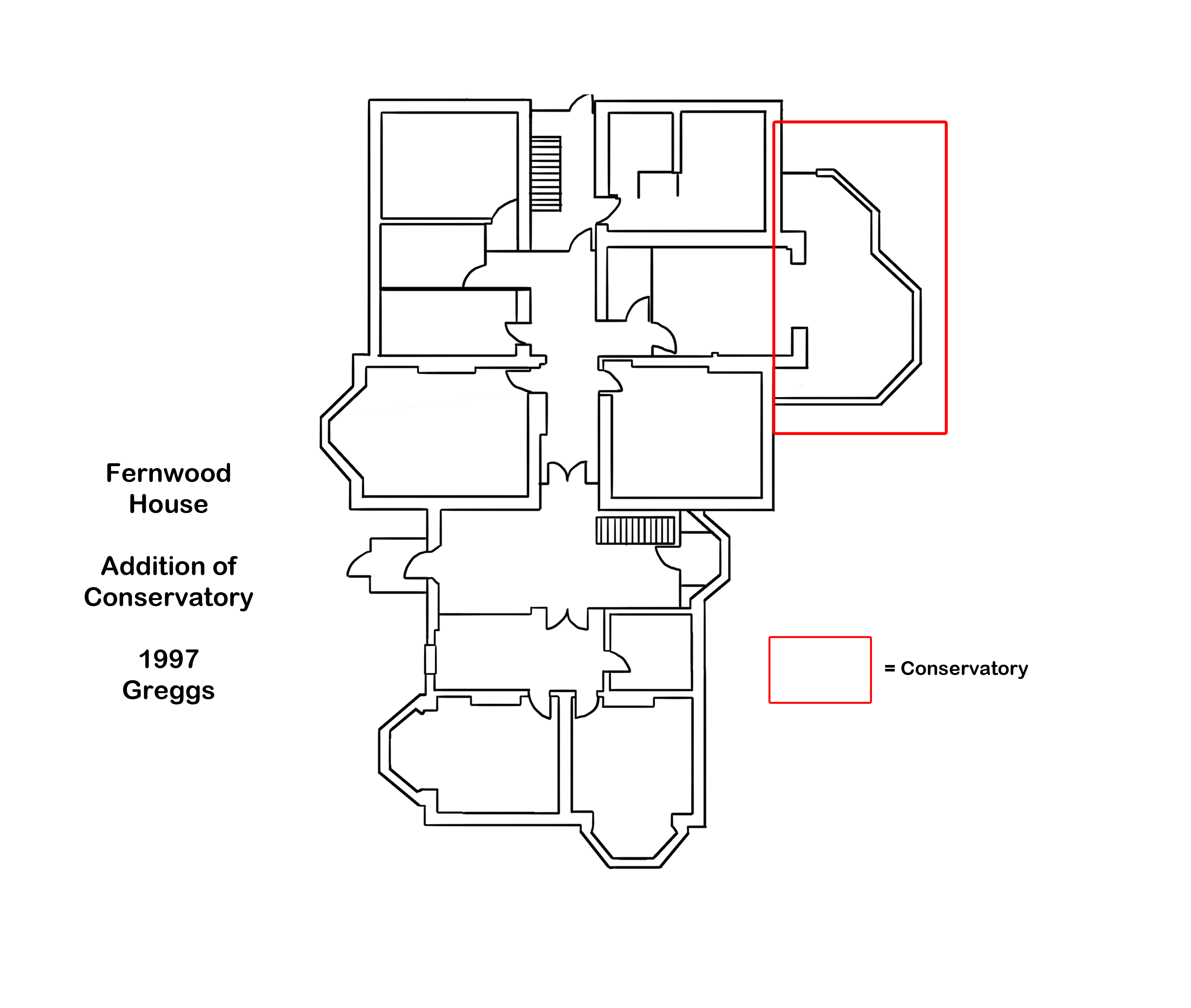

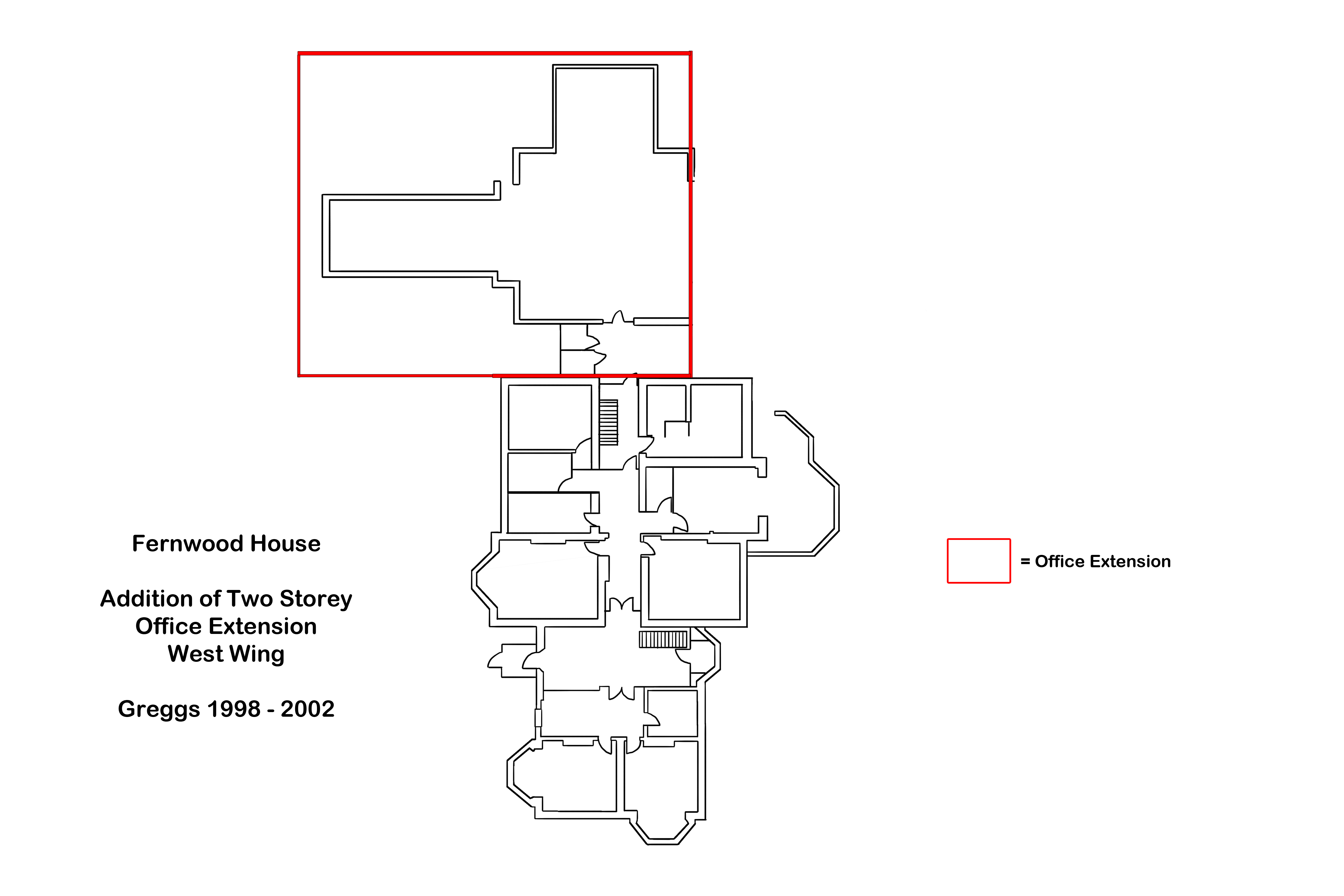

Lowes Group acquired the premises in May 2016 and it became the head office of Lowes Financial Management. Lowes was previously based at the nearby Holmwood House from 1984 onwards. The building was situated a couple of buildings away on Clayton Road.
