= Norman Wooding =

British industrialist

Sir Norman Samuel Wooding CBE (20 April 1927 – 27 June 2005) was a leading British industrialist with a PhD in chemistry. He was also a friend of former chancellor of the University of Bath, Sir Frank Kearton, later Lord Kearton.

Sir Norman Wooding wrote a memoir titled Norman Wooding Recollections, which was published by The Memoir Club.
