= Bernard Hollowood =

English writer, cartoonist, and economist

Albert Bernard Hollowood (3 June 1910 – 28 March 1981) was an English writer, cartoonist and economist. He was editor of the humorous weekly magazine Punch from 1957 to 1968.

== Life and career ==
Born on 3 June 1910 at Burslem, Stoke-on-Trent, Staffordshire, Bernard Hollowood was educated at Hanley High School and St Paul's College, Cheltenham. He read economics at London University and graduated in 1936. He subsequently taught commerce, economics and geography at the City School of Commerce, Stoke-on-Trent. He moved to Loughborough College in 1941, where he was Head of the Commerce Department.

He was a self-taught artist. He generally used a mapping pen and Indian ink on Whatman paper. Though not a good draughtsman, he sold his first drawings to Chamber's Journal, Lilliput and Men Only in 1942. Before long he was contributing drawings and articles to Punch.

He left Loughborough College in 1944 and joined the staff of The Economist. He stayed with the journal until 1945, becoming assistant editor. He was an expert on industrial ceramics, and was editor of Pottery and Glass from 1944 to 1950. From 1946 to 1947 he was research officer at the Council of Industrial Design.

Hollowood was elected to the Punch Table in 1945. He was appointed the magazine's editor in 1957. He set very high standards, and would often require cartoonists to revise their submissions several times. Under him, Punch's circulation continued at around 115,000 copies, but he never became as well known as Malcolm Muggeridge, his immediate predecessor as editor. He left Punch in 1968.

From 1957 to 1960, he was a pocket cartoonist for the Sunday Times. He was also a regular contributor of articles or cartoons to many other publications, including The Times, Geographical Magazine, Socialist Commentary, the Surrey Advertiser, News Chronicle, The Cricketer, London Opinion, The New Yorker, the Evening Standard, and the Daily and Sunday Telegraph. As well as his own name, he also wrote and drew as 'Mammon'. A small selection of his cartoons is viewable online at the British Cartoon Archive.

He was a member of the Court of Governors of the London School of Economics. He was elected a Fellow of the Royal Society of Arts (FRSA) in 1949. In 1962 he was awarded the Silver Medal of the Society for his lecture on humour. Bernard Levin interviewed him for his TV series The Levin Interview in 1966.

== The cricketer ==
He was a good enough cricketer to play Minor Counties cricket for Staffordshire between 1930 and 1947 as a batsman and occasional bowler, and he also captained Burslem who played in the North Staffordshire League. His father and two brothers also played for Staffordshire.

One of his Staffordshire team-mates was the great bowler Sydney Barnes, whose last match for Staffordshire was in 1935. Hollowood drew two cartoons of Barnes, which appear in his book Cricket on the Brain. One depicts him leaping in the air as he appeals for a dismissal and with his index finger raised as though he himself is adjudicating on the appeal. It is entitled 'A.N. Other lbw Barnes.... 0'. John Arlott wrote in his review of the book for Wisden: "...his two caricatures of S.F. Barnes would seem transcendent if they were not outweighed by his chapter on that great bowler which is a fine passage of cricket literature... this is a book of many and well-cut facets."

Hollowood died 28 March 1981 at Shamley Green, Surrey.

== Bibliography ==
=== Author ===
- The Things We See No.4 (Pottery and Glass), Penguin, 1947.
- Britain Inside-Out, Sidgwick & Jackson, 1948.
- Scowle and Other Papers, Penguin, 1948.
- Poor Little Rich World, Nelson, 1948.
- The Hawksmoor Scandals, George C. Harrap, 1949.
- Cornish Engineers, Holman Brothers Ltd, 1951.
- The Story of Morro Velho, St. John d'el Rey Mining Co, 1955.
- Tory Story: Incorporating 'Living with Labour' and 'Liberal Outlook', Hammond in conjunction with Transworld, 1964.
- Pont: An Account of the Life and Work of Graham Laidler, The Great Punch Artist, Collins, 1969, ISBN 0-00-211674-X.
- Cricket on the Brain, Eyre & Spottiswoode, 1970, ISBN 0-413-28010-1.
- Tales of Tommy Barr, with Jane Hollowood, Chatto, 1970, ISBN 978-0-7011-0330-9.
- Funny Money, Macdonald and Jane's, 1975, ISBN 0-356-08328-4.

=== Illustrator ===
- When I Was a Lad, by A. A. Thomson, Epworth Press, 1964.
- Organo Pleno, by Gordon Reynolds, Novello, 1970, ISBN 0-85360-004-X.
- Full Swell, by Gordon Reynolds, Novello, 1972, ISBN 0-85360-039-2.

=== Editor ===
- Pick of Punch, 1960, Hutchinson.
- The Women of Punch, Arthur Barker, 1961.
- Pick of Punch, 1962, Arthur Barker.
- Pick of Punch, 1963, Hutchinson.
- Pick of Punch, 1964, Hutchinson.
- Pick of Punch, 1965, Hutchinson.
- Pick of Punch, 1966, Hutchinson.
- Pick of Punch, 1967, Hutchinson.
- Pick of Punch, 1968, Hutchinson.
