= Discovery Academy, Stoke-on-Trent =

Discovery Academy - Current Ofsted - Requires Improvement

Location
- Discovery Drive; Bentilee; Stoke-on-Trent, Staffordshire, ST2 0GA; England
- Coordinates: 53.0071°N 2.11622°W

Information
- Type: Academy
- Local authority: Stoke-on-Trent
- Department for Education URN: 136681 Tables
- Ofsted: Reports
- Principal: Jayne Schofield
- Staff: purple
- Gender: Mixed
- Age: 11 to 16
- Enrolment: 1,094 as of March 2016
- Website: http://www.thediscoveryacademy.co.uk/

Discovery Academy is a mixed secondary school located in the Bentilee area of Stoke-on-Trent in the English county of Staffordshire.

The school was formed in September 2011 from the merger of Mitchell High School in Bucknall and Edensor High School in Longton. The school was originally based over both of the former school sites, however the school relocated to a new campus built on the site of the former Willfield Centre in September 2013. The new school buildings were officially opened by Peter Coates, Chairman of the Stoke City Football Club, in July 2014.

Discovery Academy is part of the College Academies Trust, sponsored by Stoke-on-Trent College. Other schools in the trust include Excel Academy, Maple Court Academy and Stoke Studio College.
