= British Cartoon Archive =

Archive of British editorial, socio-political, and pocket cartoons

Coordinates: 51.2977°N 1.0691°E

The British Cartoon Archive (BCA) is a department of the University of Kent, at Canterbury in Kent, England, and holds the national collection of political and social-comment cartoons from British newspapers and magazines. Created in 1973, the BCA collection includes 130,000 original drawings by 350 different cartoonists, plus some 90,000 cuttings, and a library of books and magazines. Its website gives free access to its holdings, including a fully searchable catalogue of 200,000 cartoon images.

The archive is located in Templeman Library, and includes a public exhibit gallery.

== History ==
The formation of an academic study centre dedicated to political and social cartoons was first discussed at the University of Kent, in 1972. Interest in the subject had been revived by a successful cartoon exhibition at the National Portrait Gallery two years earlier, entitled "Drawn and Quartered". Dr Graham Thomas, a lecturer in the university's Department of Politics, contacted national newspapers in an effort to locate surviving collections of cartoons, and had found them eager to dispose of the material they held.

The idea of a "Cartoon Study Centre" began to take shape, and the first deposit of three and a quarter tons of cartoons - 20,000 original drawings - soon arrived from Fleet Street. In November 1973, the University of Kent formally established a "Centre for the Study of Cartoons and Caricature". Within ten years the original deposit had grown to a collection of 70,000 original drawings, and by 2009 it stood at 130,000 original drawings, making it by far the largest archive of British cartoon artwork.

In 1988, the BCA began to develop a computer catalogue, and in 1990 it began adding digital images of its cartoons. Some 18,000 catalogued cartoons were released on CD-ROM in 1996, and three years later all 30,000 catalogued images became available through the BCA website. This catalogue now contains over 200,000 images, and with some major collections researchers can see variant images of a cartoon, including the original artwork, pulls from the printing plate, and the final version on newsprint.
