= Bentilee =

Coordinates: 53.0129°N 2.1263°W

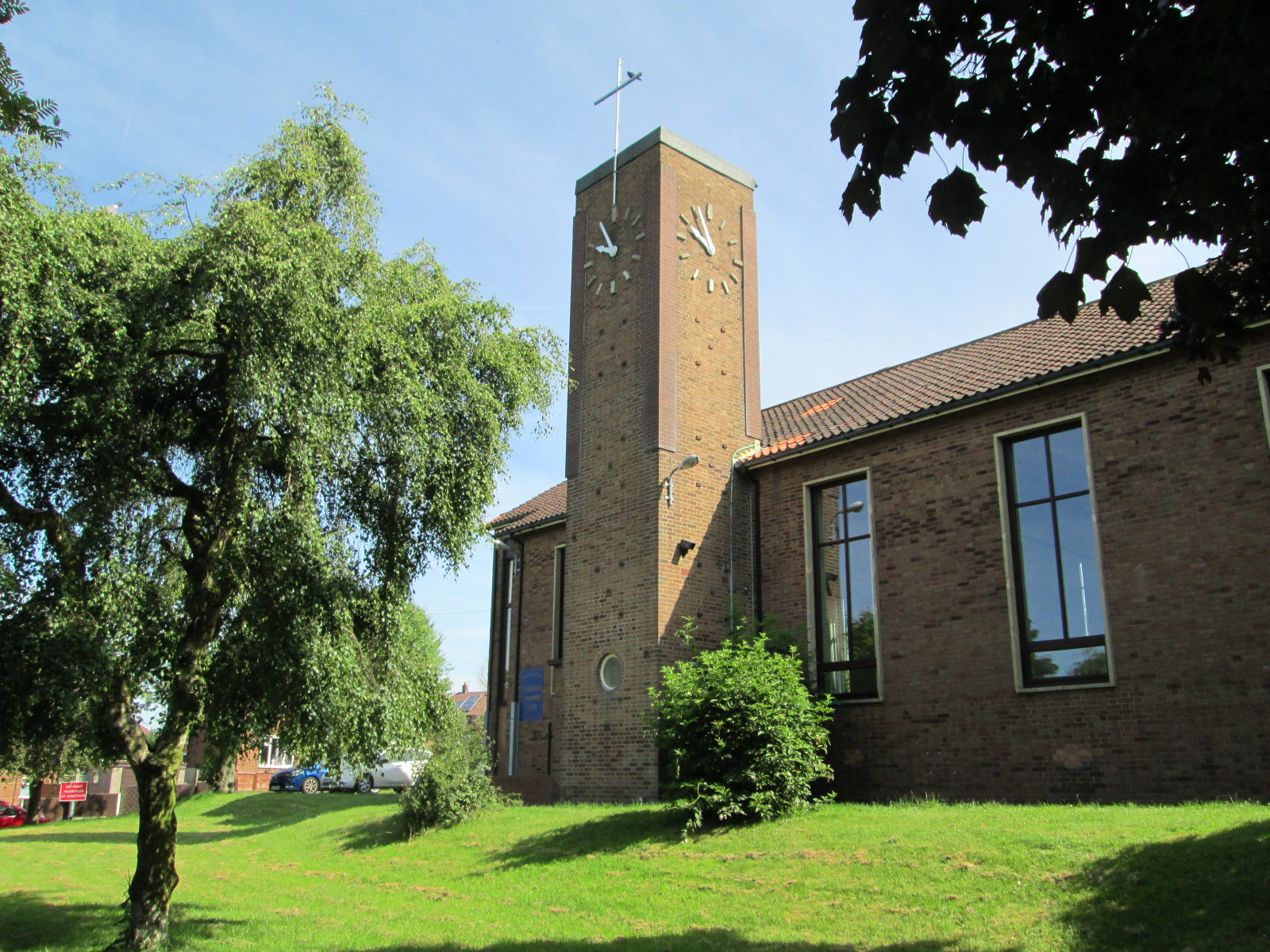
- St Stephen's Church, Bentilee

- Location within Staffordshire
- Population: 10,779 (2011. Ward Bentilee and Ubberley)
- OS grid reference: SJ916461
- Unitary authority: Stoke-on-Trent
- Ceremonial county: Staffordshire
- Region: West Midlands
- Country: England
- Sovereign state: United Kingdom
- Post town: STOKE-ON-TRENT
- Postcode district: ST2
- Dialling code: 01782
- Police: Staffordshire
- Fire: Staffordshire
- Ambulance: West Midlands
- UK Parliament: Stoke-on-Trent Central

Bentilee is a housing estate in Stoke-on-Trent, Staffordshire, England, between Hanley and Longton, and parallel with Fenton.

== History ==
Built in the 1950s, Bentilee was at that time one of the largest estates in Europe, with around 4,500 properties. The streets in the area are named after various places in the UK e.g. Winchester Avenue, Chelmsford Drive, and Devonshire Square.

Originally, it consisted almost wholly of social housing, managed by Stoke City Council. The Right to Buy brought in by the Conservative government of the 1980s led to many of the semi-detached houses that make up most of the housing stock in the area being bought by their tenants, so that now approximately 25% of local houses are privately owned.

In the 1990s, the estate's 925 cottage flats were transferred to the management of Bentilee Community Housing Limited (now called EPIC), under the Estates Action scheme that provided government funding to bring the properties up to a modern standard with many receiving new kitchens, new bathrooms, central heating, double-glazing, and rewiring.

== Recent developments ==
In recent history, the estate has also been the subject of a 7-year-long Villages Initiative Single Regeneration Budget (Round 2) urban renewal scheme that aimed to do for the remaining council housing what the Estates Action scheme had done for the cottage flats (but without transferring ownership away from the council), as well as tackling local social issues and full- or part-funding a wide range of local projects such as Berryhill Retirement Village, the Millennium Project on the Berryhill Fields that separate Bentilee from Fenton, Stoke-on-Trent, and building the Moss Green housing estate (managed by Riverside Housing).

Seven years was not long enough to complete the ambitious plans for the redevelopment of the estate's main shopping and services area so the Bentilee District Centre Project was set up to carry on this work. The final result is a single building comprising shopping facilities, local library, IT Centre, walk-in health centre, and the CAB — unique in the UK.

In 2013 Discovery Academy was built on the site of the former Willfield Centre. Discovery Academy replaced Mitchell High School in Bucknall and Edensor High School in Longton. This high school is now a part of the Alpha Academy Trust, along with Excel Academy in Hanley, Maple Court Primary School and another primary school.
