= Newcastle upon Tyne Church High School =

Location
- Tankerville Terrace; Newcastle upon Tyne, NE2 3BA; England
- Coordinates: 54.9871°N 1.6091°W

Information
- Type: Independent day school
- Religious affiliation: Church of England
- Established: 1885
- Closed: 2014
- Local authority: Newcastle upon Tyne
- Ofsted: Reports
- Gender: Girls
- Age: 3 to 18

Newcastle upon Tyne Church High School (also known locally as "Church High") was a private day school for girls in Jesmond, less than a mile north of the city of Newcastle upon Tyne, England. Until 2014 it was the oldest continuously operating girls' school established in the city.

== History ==
"Church High", as the school is commonly known, was founded in 1885 by the Church Schools Company (now known as the United Church Schools Trust). It left the company in 1925 and was independent thereafter, but retained ties with the Diocese of Newcastle and St Nicholas's Cathedral.

The school was the first female team to appear on BBC Radio Top of the Form, on Monday 3 October 1949; the first series in 1948 had been for only boys' schools (in London). The team won the first round against Taunton's School for Boys in Southampton. It later progressed to the last round of the England section, where it faced a girls' grammar school team from Crediton in Devon.

Church High was one of the North East's top performing independent schools in GCSEs and A Levels. In the 2010 GCSE league table, it was ranked joint third with Central Newcastle High School out of 100 schools in the North East. 98% of its candidates scored 5 or more A*-C grades that year.

On 29 January 2013, it was announced Church High would merge with the nearby Central Newcastle High School to form Newcastle High School for Girls in 2014. The schools merged in 2014.

On Closure, a heritage website was created to make previously published school history from formation more widely accessible. ('The Centenary Book of the Newcastle upon Tyne Church High School 1885-1985, edited by Helen G. Scott and Elizabeth A. Wise published 1985)

== Notable former pupils ==
- Lucy Akhurst (born 1975), actress, writer and director.
- Ruth Caleb (born 1942), film and television producer.
- Angela Milner, (died 2021) Assistant Keeper of Paleontology, Natural History Museum, London
- Ursula Dronke (1920–2012), Medievalist and Professor of Old Norse Studies.
- Andrea Riseborough (born 1981), actress.
- Dame Irene Ward, (1895–1980), British politician.
- Ann McMullan (1923–2006), director of the Electrical Association for Women
