= Ely Devons =

British economist

- Born: July 29, 1913; Bangor, Gwynedd, North Wales
- Died: December 28, 1967 (aged 54); St Thomas' Hospital, London, England
- Citizenship: British
- Education: Hanley High School; Victoria University of Manchester
- Occupations: Economist; statistician; academic
- Known for: Chief Statistician, Central Statistics Office (1940–1945); Director General of Planning, Programmes and Statistics with the Ministry of Aircraft Production
- Spouse: Estelle Wine
- Children: 3
- Relatives: Samuel Devons (brother)

Ely Devons (29 July 1913 – 28 December 1967), an economist and statistician, was born in Bangor, Gwynedd North Wales, lived most of his life in Manchester and died after a long illness at St Thomas Hospital in London. He was survived by his wife, the concert pianist Estelle Wine, and their three children. His father was a rabbi from Lithuania, while scientist Samuel Devons was his brother.

== Life ==
As a child Devons' family moved throughout Britain and he was schooled at Hanley High School, Portsmouth Grammar School, and North Manchester Grammar School. From 1931 to 1934, Devons attended the Victoria University of Manchester where he read economics, politics and modern history and graduated with first class honours. After graduating he received a research fellowship to undertake an MA specialising in economics and produced a well-received thesis on productivity that was published in The Economic Journal.

He worked as an economic assistant in Manchester at the Joint Committee of Cotton Trades Organisations over the period 1935–1939 and was brought into the Ministry of Supply, as a statistician working on Cotton Control, soon after the outbreak of the Second World War. Within a year he was encouraged to join the War Cabinet's Central Economic Intelligence Service (the precursor to the Economic Section and Central Statistics Office) by John Jewkes and Harry Campion, two former colleagues from Manchester. Devons began work in Whitehall in March 1940 and joined a tight group of former academics and economists – a group that also included Lionel Robbins, Norman Chester, Alec Cairncross, Evan Durbin, D.G. Champernowne, and Harold Wilson – drafted into the British war effort. Between 1940 and 1945 he became the first Chief Statistician for the Central Statistics Office, then Director of Statistics, and finally the Director General of Planning, Programmes and Statistics with the Ministry of Aircraft Production.

After the war, he returned to Manchester as a Reader in Applied Economics and, in 1947, was appointed the Robert Ottley Professor of Applied Economics (the first such chair in a British University). Despite initial reservations, he remained at Manchester until 1959 and helped to build a dynamic Faculty of Economic and Social Studies working alongside Arthur Lewis, Harry Johnson, Michael Polyani, Max Gluckman and Bill Mackenzie. Devons' career ended at the London School of Economics (where he had replaced James Meade as Professor of Commerce) when illness forced his early retirement in 1965; the Ely Devons Prize, for outstanding performance in the MSc Econometrics and Mathematical Economics programme, is awarded in his honour. Away from Higher Education, he served on the council of the Royal Economic Society (1956–1964), the Local Government Commission (1959 to 1965) and as a sometime Government advisor to the aircraft industry and Monopolies Commission.

== Influence ==
Despite being known for his obstinacy, Devons was well liked by his colleagues and well respected by his peers. Though often a critic, he was an able and constructive administrator who held a wide range of research interests. These were disseminated across a range of academic papers, newspaper articles and broadcast talks as well as in a notable survey of his wartime experience. This work has since been overlooked by economists and historians alike, but has recently been rediscovered as both as 'a useful source of practical operations management "know how"’ and as an important source to use when considering the complex relationship between economics and politics in Britain during the 1940s and 1950s.

== External Resources ==
- Ely Devons Papers at the University of Manchester Library

Professional and academic associations
Preceded by A. H. Allman	President of the Manchester Statistical Society; 1958–59	Succeeded by M. S. Bartlett
