= Ann McMullan =

Director of the Electrical Association for Women

Ann McMullan MBE
- Born: Ann Glendenning; 12 May 1923; Newcastle upon Tyne
- Died: 9 March 2006 (aged 82); Berkshire, England
- Known for: Director of the Electrical Association for Women

Ann McMullan MBE (12 May 1923 – 9 March 2006), was Director of the Electrical Association for Women as well as an officer of the Women's Auxiliary Air Force.

== Biography ==
Ann McMullan was born in Newcastle upon Tyne on 12 May 1923 to Garth Glendenning and Madelaine Greener. Her grandparents were George Hammerton Glendenning and Alice Glendenning. As a result she was a cousin of Graham Laidler.

== Education ==
She got her education from Church High School before going on to Abbey College at Malvern Wells. She graduated from a course in domestic science before joining the WAAF during the Second World War.

== Career ==
McMullan served as a Code and Cypher Officer at Fighter Command Headquarters. After the end of the war McMullan went to Germany to work with displaced persons for a local community organisation. She moved on to Hong Kong for a time before going to South Africa to work with the African Children's Feeding Scheme in Johannesburg.

McMullan went on to get a diploma in Public Relations from the Communications, Advertising and Marketing foundation. Continuing to work in charities, McMullan was the head of education for the British Epilepsy Association which was founded in 1950.

On 1 March 1976 she became the director of the Electrical Association for Women. She was central to the association's involvement with the Nuclear industry in Britain. They arranged the program Get into Lane (Learning about Nuclear Energy). She edited "Essential Electricity, A User's Guide" in 1983. She wrote a biography of her cousin Graham Laidler, better known as the cartoonist Pont, which was published posthumously on Kindle in 2022.

== Personal life ==
McMullan also flew with the Thames Valley Gliding Club. She married Peter Greville Kay Williamson on 4 November 1944. They had three daughters and one son. She later married Robert McMullan in 1955, and had two more sons. She was also awarded an MBE in 1985.

She died in 2006 and is buried in Warkworth, Northumberland.
