= Bucknall, Staffordshire =

Suburb of Stoke-on-Trent, England

Coordinates: 53.0249°N 2.1429°W

Bucknall
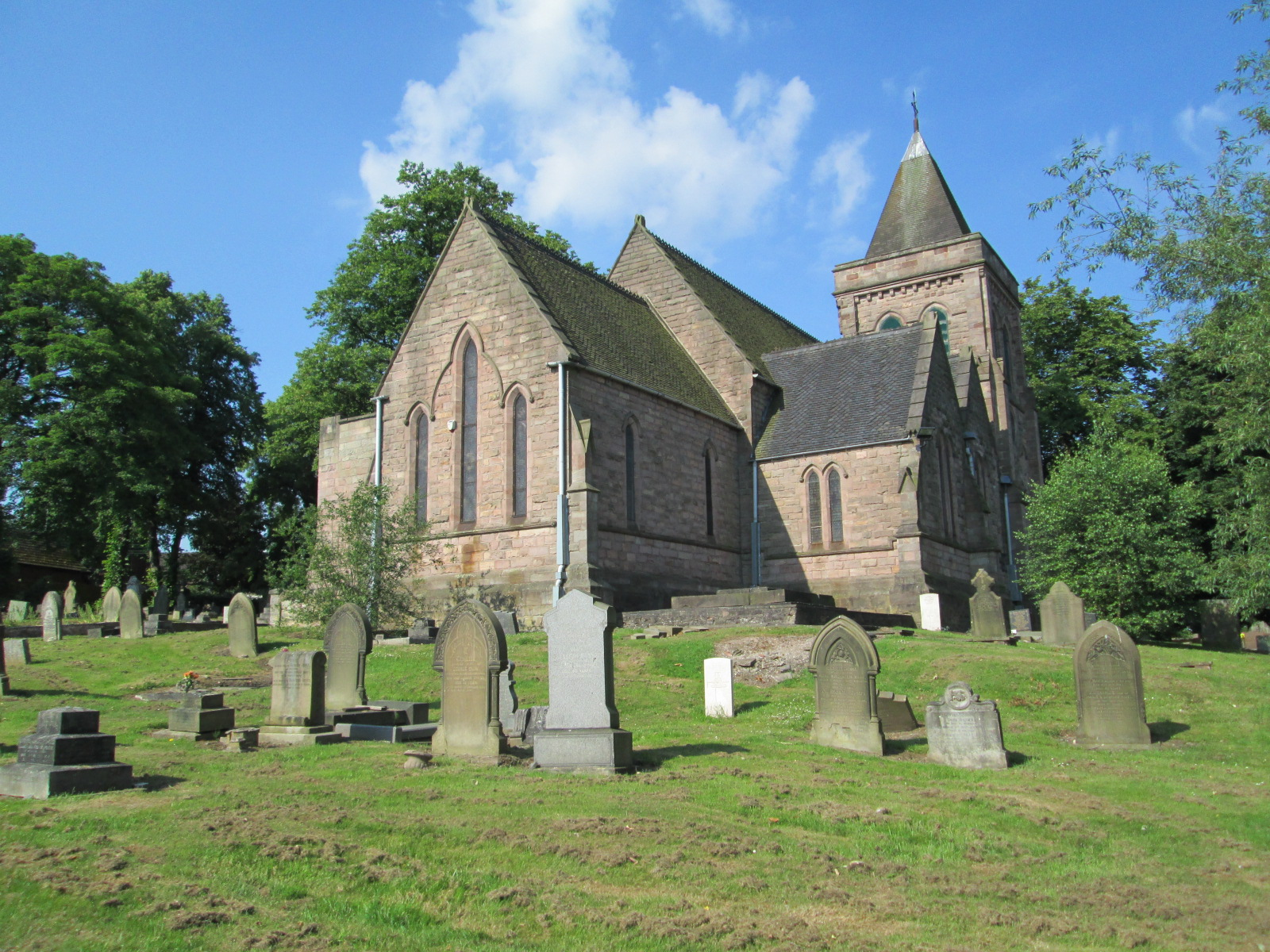
- The Church of St. Mary the Virgin, Bucknall

- Location within Staffordshire
- Population: 5,314
- OS grid reference: SJ905475
- Unitary authority: Stoke-on-Trent
- Ceremonial county: Staffordshire
- Region: West Midlands
- Country: England
- Sovereign state: United Kingdom
- Post town: STOKE-ON-TRENT
- Postcode district: ST2
- Dialling code: 01782
- Police: Staffordshire
- Fire: Staffordshire
- Ambulance: West Midlands
- UK Parliament: Stoke-on-Trent Central

Bucknall is a suburb in the city of Stoke-on-Trent, Staffordshire. Located approximately 1.5 miles east of Hanley, it is also an adjoining hamlet to Eaves. Historically, the area was predominantly rural - with scattered early coal workings.

The name "Bucknall" may originate from either Bucca, a personal name, or from the Old English word 'bucca,’ meaning a buck. The second part could derive from the Old English 'halh,’ meaning 'hollow' or 'hall.' In the Domesday Book, it is referred to as "Buchenole" and was part of the Crown's lands. It is recorded as having a taxable value of 0.3 geld and consisting of three ploughlands.

In 1327, the lay subsidy (a tax imposed to fund Edward III's Scottish war) recorded 18 residents in "Buckenale" - likely representing family units. The Hearth Tax returns of 1666 reveal a significant population for the time, with 41 households assessed as chargeable for tax - including John Beech's house with five hearths, two of which were "stopt upp". An additional 29 households were not chargeable. These returns included Eaves and Ubberley, but excluded Bagnall - which was listed separately. By 1841, Bucknall's population had grown to 1,608 - with 638 in the village of Bucknall, 382 in Eaves, and 214 in Ubberley.

The parish church of The Church of St. Mary the Virgin, located on Marychurch Road, was built in 1856. Designed by the architects Ward and Son of Hanley, this church replaced an earlier structure from 1718 - and reportedly used building materials from the former Hulton Abbey. Before that, a timber-framed church had occupied the same site - and was said to have extended to the current church car park. There was also a New Connexion Methodist chapel at Bucknall, built in 1824, and Wesleyan Methodist and Primitive Methodist chapels at Townsend.

The principal estate in Eaves was known as The Ash, and a substantial house named Ash Hall was constructed on a site overlooking Bucknall by Job Meigh - who was a local landowner. Ash Hall was esteemed for its exceptional domestic comfort, with few modern houses able to compare. Additionally, a half-timbered house called Brook House (which once stood on Brookhouse Lane) was removed from the village in 1974 and rebuilt in Knighton near Adbaston.

Coalworking in the area dates back to the Middle Ages, when Cistercian monks from Hulton Abbey worked surface outcrops of coal. This was exploited through the development of the Hanley and Bucknall Colliery, Mossfield Colliery, Jubilee Pit, and Lillydale Colliery - but these were effectively worked out by the end of the 19th century. The area also supported the pottery industry with water-powered flint mills located at Bucknall Bridge and Mossfield, with one being located on Ruxley Road.

Bucknall Hospital was originally the city's infectious diseases hospital, which was located on Eaves Lane until 2015. This hospital has since been demolished and the site is now home to the Bucknall Grange housing development. The village had a station on the North Staffordshire section of the London, Midland and Scottish Railway. Finney Gardens was established for public recreation around 1890.

The first known school of the area was founded in 1719 under the will of William Shawcross for 12 poor children, which was situated next to the churchyard. By the mid-19th century, this school had become known as Bucknall National School. However, the building was in poor condition by 1868 - and a new school was constructed nearby. This was designed by Henry Ward, who also designed Stoke Town Hall. The land for this new building was donated by John Tomlinson. Eventually, the school became known as Bucknall C.E (C) School. In 1974, a new school building was constructed on Piggott Grove to replace the old one. This school was Marychurch C.E (C) Primary School, which closed in 2004 following a merger with Townsend C.E (C) Primary School. Both schools have since closed, and the merged school is now known as Kingsland C.E (C) Academy. Mitchell High School was a comprehensive school located in Bucknall that educated pupils of ages 11–16. The school was merged with Edensor High School in Longton in 2011 to form Discovery Academy, with the new school relocating to a new site in Bentilee in 2013.

Ash Hall Golf Club (now defunct) first appeared in the mid-1920s. The Hall and estate were created in the Victorian era by Job Meigh. Job was a pottery manufacturer in Hanley. The property passed through the family, ending with his great-grandson William Mellor Meigh II who died in 1922, followed by his wife a year later. The estate was broken up by 1925 and the Hall was purchased by a builder named James Grant. He converted the Hall to a hotel and laid out a nine-hole golf course in the grounds.

In October 2018, local historian Samuel Bateman founded Our Bucknall (formerly Bucknall Online). It fully launched online on 1 July 2023 as a community-based, non-profit entity serving the area. Alongside this, a publicly accessible and free-to-use historical archive was included on the website - which showcases the past and present of the area. This archive has been continuously developed since 2018 and currently includes history dating back to the 17th century, at present. The aim is to grow this resource over time to provide future generations with comprehensive historical records of Bucknall.

== Notable people ==
- Hugh Bourne (1772–1852) joint founder of Primitive Methodism, the largest offshoot of Wesleyan Methodism was born at Ford Hayes Farm, Ford Hayes Lane, Bucknall
- Arthur Prince (1902–1980) an English footballer who played 102 games in the Football League
- Tommy Cheadle (1919–1993) an English footballer, played 333 games for Port Vale
- Stan Turner (1926–1991) an English footballer, made 246 appearances for Port Vale
- Garth Crooks OBE (born 1958) an English former professional footballer. He currently works for BBC Sport as the lead pundit on Final Score on BBC One on Saturday afternoons.
