= Frank Kearton, Baron Kearton =

British life peer, scientist and industrialist

The Right Honourable The Lord Kearton OBE FRS FRSA

Member of the House of Lords
- Lord Temporal
- Life peerage 5 February 1970 – 2 July 1992

Personal details
- Born: 17 February 1911 Congleton, Cheshire, England
- Died: 2 July 1992 (aged 81) Aylesbury, Buckinghamshire, England
- Spouse: Kathleen Kay
- Children: 2 boys, 2 girls
- Education: St John's College, Oxford
- Occupation: Industrialist; peer; scientist

Christopher Frank Kearton, Baron Kearton (17 February 1911 – 2 July 1992), usually known as Frank Kearton, was a British life peer in the House of Lords. He was also a scientist and industrialist and former Chancellor of the University of Bath.

== Early life and education ==
Kearton was born to Christopher John Kearton, a bricklayer, and Lilian (née Hancock) in Congleton, Cheshire, although the family moved to Tunstall in the Potteries not long after his birth. He completed his secondary education at Hanley High School before going up to St John's College, Oxford in 1929 as an open exhibitioner to read chemistry. He graduated with a First in 1933 although he did not apply for the promotion of his BA to an MA until 1959.

== Manhattan Project Involvement ==
Kearton was named (along with other 'British group' subject matter experts Tony Skyrme, Rudolf Peierls and Klaus Fuchs) as being stationed in New York in March - June 1944 and working on analysis of some of the theoretical problems with the K-25 Gaseous Diffusion project.

== Appointments and awards ==
Kearton was made an honorary Doctor of Science (DSc) by the University of Bath in 1966 when Lord Hinton was appointed the university's first Chancellor. Kearton himself was appointed Chancellor of the university in 1980 and, according to Sir Norman Wooding, was a "notably active member of the University." He was still in office as Chancellor upon his death in 1991.

- President, Society of Chemical Industry (1972–1974)
- Chairman, Royal Society for the Prevention of Accidents (1973–1980)
- Chairman and Chief Executive, British National Oil Corporation (1975–1979)
- Chairman, British Association for the Advancement of Science (1978–1979)
- Chairman, Association of Special Libraries (1980–1982)

His awards include:

- Officer of the Order of the British Empire (1946)
- Fellow, Royal Society (1961)
- Honorary Fellow, St John's College, Oxford (1965)
- Companion of The Textile Institute (1965)
- Knighted (1966)
- Honorary Doctor of Science (DSc), University of Bath (1966)
- Honorary Fellow, UMIST (1966)
- Honorary Doctor of Laws (LLD), University of Leeds (1966)
- Honorary Fellow, Institution of Chemical Engineers (1968)
- Created Baron Kearton, of Whitchurch in the County of Buckingham (5 February 1970)
- Honorary Doctor of Science (DSc), Aston University (1970)
- Honorary Doctor of Science (DSc), University of Reading (1970)
- Honorary Doctor of Science (DSc), Keele University (1970)
- Fellow (FRSA), Royal Society of Arts (1970)
- Fellow, Society of Dyers and Colourists (1974)
- Honorary Doctor of Science (DSc), University of Ulster (1975)
- Fellow, Imperial College, London (1976)
- Grand Officiale, Order of Merit, Italy (1977)
- Doctor of Civil Law (DCL), University of Oxford (1978)
- Doctor of the University (DUniv), Heriot-Watt University (1979)
- Companion of the British Institute of Management (1980)
- Honorary Doctor of Laws (LLD), University of Strathclyde (1981)
- Honorary Doctor of Laws (LLD), University of Bristol (1988)

== Personal life ==
Three years after leaving Oxford, on 16 April 1936, he married Kathleen Agnes (née Kay) whom he had met when at school through playing tennis. She had completed a French degree at Bedford College, London and was a teacher at Morecambe Grammar School. The couple later had two sons and two daughters.

Lord Kearton died from cancer on 2 July 1992 at Stoke Mandeville Hospital in Buckinghamshire and was buried at Whitchurch. He left an estate, according to probate of 14 August 1992, of £337,670.
