= Samuel Devons =

British physicist

Professor Samuel Devons
- Born: 30 September 1914; Bangor, Wales, United Kingdom
- Died: 6 December 2006 (aged 92); Westchester, New York, USA
- Citizenship: United Kingdom
- Awards: Rutherford Medal and Prize (1970)

Samuel Devons FRS (30 September 1914 – 6 December 2006) was a British physicist and science historian.

== Biography ==
Devons' parents were David Isaac Devons, a Lithuanian immigrant (1881–1926), and Edith Edelston from York (1891–1938). Economist Ely Devons was his brother. Samuel was born in Bangor, Wales. When he turned 16, he was awarded a scholarship for physics at Trinity College, Cambridge. In 1935, Devons received his bachelor's degree at Trinity, and his PhD in 1939.

== Personal life ==
Devons married Ruth Toubkin in 1938 in England, United Kingdom, and moved to the United States in 1960, to work at Columbia University Physics Department. He had four daughters (Susan, Judith, Amanda and Cathryn), and had 12 grandchildren (Laura, Marc, Benjamin, Daniel, Jesse, David, Jonathan, Anna, Jacob, Rachel, Jessica and Matthew), and 3 great-grandchildren at the time of his death (Joel, Emily and Julia,) and later Elisheva, Nachman, Nathan, Noah, Stella, Isabella, Sophia, Gavriel, Constantino, Gabriel, Racheli, Cathryn, Hannah, Shana, Sebastian, Lucas, Benyamin, Jordan, Aryeh, Luke, Oscar, and Eliyahu, for a total of 25 great grandchildren as of 2023.

In World War II, Devons served as a senior scientific officer in the Air Ministry, Ministry of Aircraft Production and Ministry of Supply, working on antiaircraft barrages, microwaves, and radar. During the war, he became a liaison officer for the US and UK, posted at the Massachusetts Institute of Technology radiation laboratory. At the end of the war, he served as a British intelligence officer in Germany, assisting in the interrogation of surrendered scientists.

In 2005, he was honored for 50 years as a Fellow of the Royal Society.

== Institutional history ==
- Lecturer in Physics, University of Cambridge, 1946–49,
- Professor of Physics, Imperial College London, 1950–55
- Langworthy Professor of Physics and Director of Physical Laboratories, University of Manchester, 1955–60.
- Professor of Physics at Columbia University, New York, 1960–85, Department Chair, 1963–67 and Professor Emeritus until he died of congestive heart failure in 2006.

== Works ==
- The Excited States of Nuclei (1949)
- Biology and Physical Sciences (1969) (ed.)
- High Energy Physics and Nuclear Structure (1970) (ed.)

Academic offices
Preceded by Patrick Blackett	Langworthy Professor at the University of Manchester; 1955–60	Succeeded by Brian Flowers
