= John Cooke (footballer, born 1942) =

English footballer

Personal information
- Full name: Edward John Cooke
- Date of birth: 18 March 1942 (age 84)
- Place of birth: Birdwell, South Yorkshire, England
- Position: Goalkeeper

Youth career
- Port Vale

Senior career*
Years	Team	Apps	(Gls)
1960–1964	Port Vale	7	(0)
1964–1971	Macclesfield Town	208	(0)
- Altrincham
- Chorley
- Morecambe
Total		215	(0)
- * Club domestic league appearances and goals

Edward John Cooke (born 18 March 1942) is an English former football goalkeeper who was a member of non-League Macclesfield Town's highly successful team of the late 1960s and early 1970s. He previously played in the Football League for Port Vale and later represented Altrincham, Chorley and Morecambe.

== Career ==
Cooke passed through the Port Vale youth team to sign professional forms under manager Norman Low in June 1960. He was only ever utilized as an emergency keeper when Ken Hancock was injured, and after just seven Third Division appearances in almost four years he was given a free transfer away from Vale Park in May 1964 by manager Freddie Steele.

He was taken to Macclesfield Town by manager Albert Leake, a former half-back at Port Vale. He held his place in the reserves before he made the first-team goalkeeping position his own from the 1965–66 season. From then on Macclesfield went on to win the Cheshire County League in 1967–68, the Northern Premier League in 1968–69 and 1969–70; and also lifted the FA Trophy at Wembley in 1970, the Cheshire Senior Cup in 1969, and the Cheshire League Challenge Cup in 1967. Cooke was also the goalkeeper for Macclesfield's third round FA Cup tie with Bobby Robson's Fulham at Craven Cottage on 27 January 1968.

"Choosing the goalkeeper was an almost impossible task, given the great tradition the club has enjoyed. In the end I opted for the hero of Fulham 1968. Besides, the number of goals conceded by the team during his stay, in the free-scoring sixties, is an eloquent statement in Johnnie Cooke's favour."

— Graham Phythian, author of Saga of the Silkmen explains why he chose Cooke as the goalkeeper in his Macclesfield Town dream team.

He went on to be signed by Altrincham as cover for Willie Mailey. He later played for Chorley and Morecambe. After retiring, he ran a plastering and construction business before becoming contracts manager for Shimizu Europe Limited.

== Career statistics ==
Appearances and goals by club, season and competition
Club	Season	League			FA Cup		Other		Total	
Club	Season	Division	Apps	Goals	Apps	Goals	Apps	Goals	Apps	Goals
Port Vale	1960–61	Third Division	4	0	0	0	0	0	4	0
Port Vale	1961–62	Third Division	1	0	0	0	0	0	1	0
Port Vale	1962–63	Third Division	0	0	0	0	0	0	0	0
Port Vale	1963–64	Third Division	2	0	0	0	0	0	2	0
Port Vale	Total		7	0	0	0	0	0	7	0
Macclesfield Town	1964–65	Cheshire County League	5	0	0	0	0	0	5	0
Macclesfield Town	1965–66	Cheshire County League	22	0	0	0	5	0	27	0
Macclesfield Town	1966–67	Cheshire County League	35	0	6	0	7	0	48	0
Macclesfield Town	1967–68	Cheshire County League	40	0	9	0	12	0	61	0
Macclesfield Town	1968–69	Northern Premier League	35	0	2	0	17	0	54	0
Macclesfield Town	1969–70	Northern Premier League	36	0	3	0	22	0	61	0
Macclesfield Town	1970–71	Northern Premier League	35	0	1	0	22	0	58	0
Macclesfield Town	Total		208	0	21	0	85	0	314	0
Career total			215	0	21	0	85	0	321	0

== Honours ==
Macclesfield Town

- Cheshire League Challenge Cup: 1967
- Cheshire County League: 1967–68
- Northern Premier League: 1968–69 and 1969–70
- Cheshire Senior Cup: 1969
- FA Trophy: 1970
