= 1968–69 Midland Football League =

Midland Football League
- Season: 1968–69
- Champions: Matlock Town
- Promoted: Matlock Town
- Matches: 306
- Goals: 986 (3.22 per match)

The 1968–69 Midland Football League season was the 69th in the history of the Midland Football League, a football competition in England.

== Clubs ==
The league featured 14 clubs which competed in the previous season, along with four new clubs:

- Ashby Institute, joined from the Lincolnshire League
- Barton Town, transferred from the Yorkshire Football League
- Boston, joined from the Eastern Counties League
- Warley, promoted from the West Midlands (Regional) League Division One

== League table ==
Pos	Team	Pld	W	D	L	GF	GA	GR	Pts	Qualification or relegation
1	Matlock Town	34	22	7	5	84	33	2.545	51	Promoted to the Northern Premier League
2	Sutton Town	34	21	9	4	61	33	1.848	51	
3	Arnold	34	18	9	7	73	52	1.404	45	
4	Grantham	34	16	10	8	78	47	1.660	42	
5	Skegness Town	34	17	8	9	57	40	1.425	42	
6	Ilkeston Town	34	17	6	11	61	35	1.743	40	
7	Alfreton Town	34	13	13	8	62	46	1.348	39	
8	Long Eaton United	34	15	8	11	49	56	0.875	38	
9	Warley	34	13	8	13	51	42	1.214	34	
10	Lockheed Leamington	34	12	8	14	53	64	0.828	32	
11	Heanor Town	34	12	7	15	67	51	1.314	31	
12	Stamford	34	11	8	15	50	57	0.877	30	
13	Ashby Institute	34	10	6	18	44	69	0.638	26	
14	Boston	34	7	11	16	38	53	0.717	25	
15	Retford Town	34	9	6	19	39	69	0.565	24	
16	Loughborough United	34	9	6	19	44	82	0.537	24	
17	Barton Town	34	7	7	20	35	78	0.449	21	
18	Belper Town	34	5	7	22	40	79	0.506	17	

Source: nonleaguematters
Rules for classification: 1) points; 2) goal difference; 3) number of goals scored.
The points system until the 1990–91 season: 2 points for a win, 1 point for a draw and 0 points for losing.
