= 1967–68 West Midlands (Regional) League =

The 1967–68 West Midlands (Regional) League season was the 68th in the history of the West Midlands (Regional) League, an English association football competition for semi-professional and amateur teams based in the West Midlands county, Shropshire, Herefordshire, Worcestershire and southern Staffordshire.

== Premier Division ==
West Midlands League Premier Division
- Season: 1967–68
- Champions: Boston United
- Matches: 462
- Goals: 1,426 (3.09 per match)

The Premier Division featured 21 clubs which competed in the division last season, along with one new club:

- Hinckley Athletic, relegated from the Southern Football League

=== League table ===
Pos	Team	Pld	W	D	L	GF	GA	GR	Pts	Promotion or relegation
1	Boston United	42	24	14	4	91	44	2.068	62	Founder members of the Northern Premier League
2	Tamworth	42	25	11	6	101	44	2.295	61	
3	Kidderminster Harriers	42	26	9	7	102	45	2.267	61	
4	Dudley Town	42	22	10	10	73	48	1.521	54	
5	Hednesford	42	22	8	12	101	63	1.603	52	
6	Halesowen Town	42	22	6	14	93	65	1.431	50	
7	Redditch	42	18	14	10	64	45	1.422	50	
8	Bromsgrove Rovers	42	19	11	12	69	56	1.232	49	
9	Atherstone Town	42	17	10	15	66	64	1.031	44	
10	Bilston	42	15	14	13	60	59	1.017	44	
11	Lye Town	42	17	9	16	61	76	0.803	43	
12	Stratford Town Amateurs	42	15	10	17	58	59	0.983	40	
13	Stourbridge	42	14	10	18	60	69	0.870	38	
14	Cinderford Town	42	12	13	17	61	61	1.000	37	
15	Darlaston	42	13	11	18	51	55	0.927	37	
16	Lower Gornal Athletic	42	13	10	19	50	68	0.735	36	
17	Brierley Hill Alliance	42	13	9	20	61	84	0.726	35	
18	Bedworth Town	42	12	7	23	42	81	0.519	31	
19	Coventry City "A"	42	10	10	22	46	77	0.597	30	Resigned from the league
20	Port Vale reserves	42	9	9	24	52	99	0.525	27	Resigned from the league
21	Wolverhampton Wanderers "A"	42	11	5	26	39	82	0.476	27	
22	Hinckley Athletic	42	4	8	30	25	82	0.305	16	

Source: nonleaguematters
Rules for classification: 1) points; 2) goal ratio.

== Division One ==
West Midlands League Division One
- Season: 1967–68
- Champions: Warley
- Matches: 342
- Goals: 1,349 (3.94 per match)

=== League table ===
Pos	Team	Pld	W	D	L	GF	GA	GR	Pts	Promotion or relegation
1	Warley	36	27	5	4	120	29	4.138	59	Promoted to the Midland Football League
2	Wrockwardine Wood	36	25	6	5	95	40	2.375	56	
3	Kidderminster Harriers reserves	36	20	6	10	78	48	1.625	46	
4	Coventry Amateurs	36	19	7	10	86	44	1.955	45	
5	Sankey of Wellington	36	20	5	11	85	50	1.700	45	
6	Beddesley Colliery	36	16	8	12	86	73	1.178	40	
7	Hereford United reserves	36	13	11	12	74	76	0.974	37	
8	Tipton Town	36	14	9	13	56	72	0.778	37	
9	Warwick Saltisford Rovers	36	12	12	12	64	65	0.985	36	
10	Dudley Town Reserves	36	10	14	12	58	69	0.841	34	
11	Stewarts & Lloyds (Bilston)	36	13	7	16	63	81	0.778	33	
12	Stourbridge reserves	36	14	4	18	77	86	0.895	32	
13	Darlaston reserves	36	11	10	15	56	70	0.800	32	
14	Tamworth reserves	36	12	5	19	76	71	1.070	29	
15	Tividale	36	11	7	18	64	74	0.865	29	
16	Bilston reserves	36	10	7	19	47	79	0.595	27	
17	Hednesford reserves	36	9	8	19	61	92	0.663	26	
18	Stratford Town Amateurs reserves	36	11	4	21	58	92	0.630	26	
19	Bedworth Town reserves	36	3	9	24	45	138	0.326	15	

Source: nonleaguematters
Rules for classification: 1) points; 2) goal ratio.
