= Mick Porter =

English footballer

Personal information
- Full name: Michael Robert Porter
- Date of birth: 19 May 1945 (age 81)
- Place of birth: Stoke-on-Trent, England
- Position: Inside forward

Youth career
- Port Vale

Senior career*
Years	Team	Apps	(Gls)
1962–1965	Port Vale	13	(2)
- Portmadoc
- * Club domestic league appearances and goals

Michael Robert Porter (born 19 May 1945) is an English former footballer who played 14 games at inside-forward for Port Vale between 1964 and 1965.

== Career ==
Porter graduated through the Port Vale youth system to sign professional forms under manager Freddie Steele in July 1962. He made his debut in a goalless draw with Barnsley at Oakwell on 20 April 1964, in the penultimate game of the 1963–64 season. Porter scored his first goal for the "Valiants" on 28 September 1964, in a 2–2 draw with Mansfield Town at Field Mill. He hit his second goal on 21 November, in a 2–0 win at Barnsley. However, the club were relegated out of the Third Division at the end of the 1964–65 season, and with 14 league and cup appearances to his name, Porter was handed a free transfer in April 1965 by manager Jackie Mudie and moved on to Portmadoc, and later Oswestry Town.

== Career statistics ==
Appearances and goals by club, season and competition
Club	Season	League			FA Cup		League Cup		Total	
Club	Season	Division	Apps	Goals	Apps	Goals	Apps	Goals	Apps	Goals
Port Vale	1962–63	Third Division	0	0	0	0	0	0	0	0
Port Vale	1963–64	Third Division	2	0	0	0	0	0	2	0
Port Vale	1964–65	Third Division	11	2	0	0	1	0	12	2
Port Vale	Total		13	2	0	0	1	0	14	2
