= 1963–64 Port Vale F.C. season =

Port Vale F.C.
1963–64 season
- Chairman: Tom Talbot
- Manager: Freddie Steele
- Stadium: Vale Park
- Football League Third Division: 13th (46 points)
- FA Cup: Fourth Round (eliminated by Liverpool)
- League Cup: First Round (eliminated by Southend United)
- Top goalscorer: League: Tony Richards (12); All: Tony Richards (13)
- Highest home attendance: 42,179 vs. Liverpool, 27 January 1964
- Lowest home attendance: 4,497 vs. Wrexham, 25 April 1964
- Average home league attendance: 10,056
- Biggest win: 5–0 vs. Wrexham, 25 April 1964
- Biggest defeat: 0–3 (twice) and 1–4
Home colours

The 1963–64 season was Port Vale's 52nd season of football in the English Football League, and their fifth season in the Third Division. Under manager Freddie Steele and chairman Tom Talbot, the club embarked on an ambitious recruitment drive — paying large transfer fees for players like Albert Cheesebrough (£20,000), Billy Bingham (£15,000), Jackie Mudie (£12,000), and Ron Wilson (£12,000) — but it proved to be a disappointing campaign both on the pitch and financially.

Vale finished a middling 13th in the league with 46 points from 46 matches, ten places below their previous season's third-place near-promotion position. The season's highlights came in the FA Cup, where Vale pulled off a major upset by beating top-flight Birmingham City at St Andrew's, then held Liverpool to 0–0 at Anfield before narrowly losing the Fourth Round replay at Vale Park. In the League Cup, Vale were eliminated at the First Round stage. Tony Richards finished as the club's top scorer with 13 goals (12 in the league), despite Vale's struggles to convert their investment into results. Support at Vale Park averaged 10,056, with the lowest attendance recorded as 4,497 against Wrexham on 25 April 1964, when Vale also secured their largest win of the campaign, a 5–0 victory.

Overall, the 1963–64 season proved a season of high spending and unfulfilled expectations. Despite cup heroics and a stable mid-table finish, Vale missed promotion, suffered financially, and underperformed given the hefty transfer outlays under Freddie Steele's leadership.

== Overview ==
=== Third Division ===
The pre-season saw manager Freddie Steele spend unprecedented sums of money, though Vale's spending was insignificant to the standard of many of their rivals. Steele brought in Northern Ireland international Billy Bingham from Everton for £15,000; Albert Cheesebrough from Leicester City for another £15,000; as well as Walsall's Tim Rawlings for £4,000. Chairman Tom Talbot approved these signings despite the club's financial problems. The club also took a tour of Northern Ireland, though a friendly with Benfica (arranged to match rivals Stoke City's match with Real Madrid) was cancelled due to fixture congestion. Manager Freddie Steele reverted the black and amber striped shirts of recent seasons to black and white as he felt it was a more "manly-looking outfit".

The season opened with a 1–0 defeat to Shrewsbury Town at Gay Meadow. This was followed with two victories, including a 4–1 win over Bristol City in which Tony Richards bagged a hat-trick. After another three poor away games came, followed by a 3–0 win over Brentford in which Cheesebrough scored a hat-trick, and a 4–0 win over nearby Crewe Alexandra in front of 17,118 fans. Richards sustained a bad leg injury in this win over Crewe. In the beginning of October, Steele bought "robust and direct" winger Ron Smith from Crewe for £6,500. Vale improved as a consequence, and three successive victories followed, leaving Vale in fifth spot. On 12 October, Vale recorded a 4–1 victory over Southend United. A 2–1 win at Wrexham a week later brought Vale up to fifth in the table. However, with Richards' return came a downturn in form, as Vale's impressive strikers failed to find the net in a run of one win in nine league games. This one win was a 1–0 victory over struggling Barnsley at Vale Park. However, a subsequent pitch invasion by youths emphasised a growing hooligan culture that would plague the club and the sport itself for decades. One youth was arrested for throwing a cup at goalkeeper Alan Hill. Unrelated to the violence, Cheesebrough left the field injured and subsequently required a cartilage operation.

In November, Vale paid Stoke City £12,000 for both ex-Scotland striker Jackie Mudie and left-back Ron Wilson. They made their debuts in a 2–0 defeat to Colchester United on 23 November. The defeats kept coming, and so Steele experimented with a 4–2–4 formation, dropping Richards from the first XI. Vale then went six league games unbeaten, including a 4–4 draw with Bristol Rovers at the Eastville Stadium where Mudie showed himself as a "master tactician" and scored two "brilliant" goals. On 11 January, a 1–0 home win over third-placed Oldham Athletic took them to within five points of the promotion places with a match in hand. However, despite Cheesebrough's return to fitness, a 1–0 home loss inflicted by Notts County sent Vale on a run of seven defeats and two draws in nine league games. By March, the club was in a relegation battle, though results then began to go Vale's way. Only one defeat in their final eleven games ensured safety, as the season ended with a 5–0 drubbing of already-relegated Wrexham.

They finished in 13th place with 46 points, a poor finish for the money spent on transfers. Only 53 goals were scored, as Richards and Cheeseborough were affected with injuries, and Bingham struggled to find his footing in the third tier. Their 49 goals conceded was an excellent record though.

=== Finances ===
On the financial side, good attendance figures failed to prevent a massive loss of £42,650, resulting from a £45,567 deficit in transfer fees. A donation of £19,867 from the Sportsmen's Association and the social club could not disguise the disaster of poor finances. The wage bill had also risen by 20% to over £40,000. Leaving the club were Colin Grainger to Doncaster Rovers and Terry Harkin to Crewe Alexandra for a £3,000 fee.

=== Cup competitions ===
In the FA Cup, Vale "turned on that old cup magic" against Fourth Division side Bradford City with a 2–1 win at Valley Parade. They defeated Workington 2–1 in a 'slipshod affair'. The third round held First Division club Birmingham City at St Andrew's. Three thousand of the 21,652 spectators were Vale fans, who 'sung and chanted their way through' a 2–1 victory as John Nicholson played on despite suffering from concussion. Vale had controlled most of the game, looking the more efficient and well-drilled team. In the fourth round, Vale were drawn against top-flight giants Liverpool at Anfield. The "Reds" had inflicted a 6–1 thrashing of Stoke on Boxing Day, in an ominous sign of the challenge the "Valiants" faced. Vale achieved a goalless draw in front of 52,327 fans – 8,000 of them Vale supporters – in a fantastic team performance. The replay at Vale Park ended in a 2–1 loss in front of 42,179 paying fans (as well as an additional 6,000 or so Liverpool supporters who 'mob stormed' the gates to enter the Railway Paddock). Crowd trouble ate into the £8,000 worth of gate receipts, and more significantly caused the death of a Leek man (Harold Birch), and saw serious injuries inflicted to Liverpool fans Harry Taylor and James McDonough, as well as Vale supporter Billy Poulson (son of the former player of the same name).

In the League Cup, a first-round exit came with a 2–1 defeat at Southend United's Roots Hall.

== Results ==
=== Football League Third Division ===
==== League table ====
Pos	Team	Pld	W	D	L	GF	GA	GAv	Pts
11	Shrewsbury Town	46	18	11	17	73	80	0.913	47
12	Bristol Rovers	46	19	8	19	91	79	1.152	46
13	Port Vale	46	16	14	16	53	49	1.082	46
14	Southend United	46	15	15	16	77	78	0.987	45
15	Queens Park Rangers	46	18	9	19	76	78	0.974	45

==== Results by matchday ====
Round	1	2	3	4	5	6	7	8	9	10	11	12	13	14	15	16	17	18	19	20	21	22	23	24	25	26	27	28	29	30	31	32	33	34	35	36	37	38	39	40	41	42	43	44	45	46
Ground	A	H	H	A	A	A	H	H	A	A	H	A	H	H	A	A	H	H	A	H	H	A	H	A	H	A	H	H	A	H	A	A	H	A	A	A	H	H	A	A	H	H	H	A	A	H
Result	L	W	W	L	D	L	W	W	L	W	D	L	W	W	W	L	D	D	L	W	L	D	D	D	W	D	W	L	L	L	L	D	L	L	L	D	W	D	D	W	W	D	W	L	D	W
Position	21	9	4	11	10	16	7	6	10	8	9	12	9	6	5	6	7	7	12	10	10	12	13	13	10	9	8	10	11	13	13	15	15	16	17	17	16	17	16	15	14	14	13	14	14	13
Points	0	2	4	4	5	5	7	9	9	11	12	12	14	16	18	18	19	20	20	22	22	23	24	25	27	28	30	30	30	30	30	31	31	31	31	32	34	35	36	38	40	41	43	43	44	46

Source: Statto
A = Away; H = Home; W = Win; D = Draw; L = Loss

==== Matches ====
24 August 1963 1	Shrewsbury Town	1–0	Port Vale	Shrewsbury
		Report		Stadium: Gay Meadow; Attendance: 9,710

26 August 1963 2	Port Vale	1–0	Mansfield Town	Burslem
	Richards	Report		Stadium: Vale Park; Attendance: 14,451

31 August 1963 3	Port Vale	4–1	Bristol City	Burslem
	Richards; Rowland	Report		Stadium: Vale Park; Attendance: 10,363

7 September 1963 4	Oldham Athletic	1–0	Port Vale	Oldham
		Report		Stadium: Boundary Park; Attendance: 14,730

9 September 1963 5	Mansfield Town	1–1	Port Vale	Mansfield
	Boner	Report	B.Hancock	Stadium: Field Mill; Attendance: 12,064

14 September 1963 6	Notts County	2–0	Port Vale	Nottingham
		Report		Stadium: Meadow Lane; Attendance: 7,309

16 September 1963 7	Port Vale	3–0	Brentford	Burslem
	Cheesebrough	Report		Stadium: Vale Park; Attendance: 11,539

21 September 1963 8	Port Vale	4–0	Crewe Alexandra	Burslem
	Cheesebrough; Bingham; Steele; Richards	Report		Stadium: Vale Park; Attendance: 17,118

28 September 1963 9	Crystal Palace	2–0	Port Vale	Selhurst, Croydon
		Report		Stadium: Selhurst Park; Attendance: 15,044

1 October 1963 10	Brentford	1–2	Port Vale	Brentford, West London
	McAdams	Report	Poole; Cheesebrough	Stadium: Griffin Park; Attendance: 11,914

5 October 1963 11	Port Vale	2–2	Walsall	Burslem
	Bingham (og.)	Report		Stadium: Vale Park; Attendance: 12,760

9 October 1963 12	Luton Town	1–0	Port Vale	Luton
		Report		Stadium: Kenilworth Road; Attendance: 5,914

12 October 1963 13	Port Vale	4–1	Southend United	Burslem
	Rowland; Smith; Harkin; Miles	Report		Stadium: Vale Park; Attendance: 10,306

14 October 1963 14	Port Vale	1–0	Luton Town	Burslem
	Rawlings	Report		Stadium: Vale Park; Attendance: 11,449

19 October 1963 15	Wrexham	1–2	Port Vale	Wrexham
15:15 BST	Griffiths 59'	Report	Bingham 36', 52'	Stadium: Racecourse Ground; Attendance: 6,781; Referee: A.W. Luty; Assistant referees: H.V. Allsop, S. Read

23 October 1963 16	Reading	1–0	Port Vale	Reading, Berkshire
		Report		Stadium: Elm Park; Attendance: 8,731

26 October 1963 17	Port Vale	0–0	Bournemouth & Boscombe Athletic	Burslem
		Report		Stadium: Vale Park; Attendance: 12,402

28 October 1963 18	Port Vale	0–0	Reading	Burslem
		Report		Stadium: Vale Park; Attendance: 9,492

2 November 1963 19	Hull City	4–1	Port Vale	Kingston upon Hull
15:00 GMT	Chilton 28', 60'; Wilkinson 51', 64'	Report	Richards	Stadium: Boothferry Park; Attendance: 8,460

9 November 1963 20	Port Vale	1–0	Barnsley	Burslem
	Steele	Report		Stadium: Vale Park; Attendance: 9,083

23 November 1963 21	Port Vale	0–2	Colchester United	Burslem
		Report	Hunt 3', 50'	Stadium: Vale Park; Attendance: 11,108; Referee: A. Jones

30 November 1963 22	Watford	1–1	Port Vale	Watford
	Oliver	Report	Poole	Stadium: Vicarage Road; Attendance: 9,890

14 December 1963 23	Port Vale	1–1	Shrewsbury Town	Burslem
	Mudie	Report		Stadium: Vale Park; Attendance: 6,906

21 December 1963 24	Bristol City	0–0	Port Vale	Ashton Gate, Bristol
		Report		Stadium: Ashton Gate; Attendance: 6,021

26 December 1963 25	Port Vale	1–0	Bristol Rovers	Burslem
	Mudie	Report		Stadium: Vale Park; Attendance: 11,442

28 December 1963 26	Bristol Rovers	4–4	Port Vale	Bristol
		Report	Richards; Mudie	Stadium: Eastville Stadium; Attendance: 12,954

11 January 1964 27	Port Vale	1–0	Oldham Athletic	Burslem
	Richards	Report		Stadium: Vale Park; Attendance: 12,322

18 January 1964 28	Port Vale	0–1	Notts County	Burslem
		Report		Stadium: Vale Park; Attendance: 7,337

31 January 1964 29	Crewe Alexandra	1–0	Port Vale	Crewe
		Report		Stadium: Gresty Road; Attendance: 9,425

8 February 1964 30	Port Vale	1–2	Crystal Palace	Burslem
	Richards	Report		Stadium: Vale Park; Attendance: 8,204

15 February 1964 31	Walsall	2–1	Port Vale	Walsall
		Report	Mudie	Stadium: Fellows Park; Attendance: 7,056

22 February 1964 32	Southend United	1–1	Port Vale	Southend-on-Sea
		Report	Smith	Stadium: Roots Hall; Attendance: 7,612

29 February 1964 33	Port Vale	1–2	Peterborough United	Burslem
	Poole	Report	Jackson; Smith	Stadium: Vale Park; Attendance: 6,613; Referee: W. Haynes

7 March 1964 34	Bournemouth & Boscombe Athletic	3–0	Port Vale	Bournemouth
		Report		Stadium: Dean Court; Attendance: 7,584

16 March 1964 35	Millwall	3–1	Port Vale	New Cross, Lewisham
		Report	Mudie	Stadium: The Den; Attendance: 8,312

23 March 1964 36	Peterborough United	1–1	Port Vale	Peterborough
	Horobin	Report	Steele	Stadium: London Road Stadium; Attendance: 10,408; Referee: G. Davis

28 March 1964 37	Port Vale	1–0	Millwall	Burslem
	Bingham	Report		Stadium: Vale Park; Attendance: 5,385

30 March 1964 38	Port Vale	1–1	Coventry City	Burslem
	Steele	Report	own goal	Stadium: Vale Park; Attendance: 17,567

31 March 1964 39	Coventry City	1–1	Port Vale	Coventry
	Kirby	Report	Smith	Stadium: Highfield Road; Attendance: 29,641

4 April 1964 40	Colchester United	1–2	Port Vale	Colchester
	Stark 66'	Report	Miles 4'; Rowland 77'	Stadium: Layer Road; Attendance: 3,263; Referee: T. Dawes

6 April 1964 41	Port Vale	2–0	Queens Park Rangers	Burslem
	Steele; Smith	Report		Stadium: Vale Park; Attendance: 7,167

11 April 1964 42	Port Vale	0–0	Watford	Burslem
		Report		Stadium: Vale Park; Attendance: 7,698

13 April 1964 43	Port Vale	1–0	Hull City	Burslem
	Rowland	Report		Stadium: Vale Park; Attendance: 6,090

18 April 1964 44	Queens Park Rangers	3–0	Port Vale	Shepherd's Bush, West London
	Bedford; Leary	Report		Stadium: Loftus Road; Attendance: 4,955

20 April 1964 45	Barnsley	0–0	Port Vale	Barnsley
		Report		Stadium: Oakwell; Attendance: 4,918

25 April 1964 46	Port Vale	5–0	Wrexham	Burslem
15:15 GMT	Richards 11', 80'; Bingham 26' (pen.); Smith 59'; Cheesebrough 72'	Report		Stadium: Vale Park; Attendance: 4,497; Referee: V. James; Assistant referees: H. Thompson, A. Johnson

=== FA Cup ===
16 November 1963 R1	Bradford City	1–2	Port Vale	Bradford
		Report	Whalley; Richards	Stadium: Valley Parade; Attendance: 8,189

7 December 1963 R2	Port Vale	2–1	Workington	Burslem
	Steele; Bingham	Report		Stadium: Vale Park; Attendance: 10,286

4 January 1964 R3	Birmingham City	1–2	Port Vale	Birmingham
	Beard	Report	Sproson; Mudie	Stadium: St Andrew's; Attendance: 21,652

25 January 1964 R4	Liverpool	0–0	Port Vale	Liverpool
		Report		Stadium: Anfield; Attendance: 52,327

27 January 1964 Replay	Port Vale	1–2 (a.e.t.)	Liverpool	Burslem
	Cheesebrough 79'	Report	Hunt 35'; Thompson 118'	Stadium: Vale Park; Attendance: 42,179

=== League Cup ===
25 September 1963 R2	Southend United	2–1	Port Vale	Southend-on-Sea
		Report	Harkin	Stadium: Roots Hall; Attendance: 6,126

== Squad statistics ==
=== Appearances and goals ===
Key to positions: GK – Goalkeeper; DF – Defender; MF – Midfielder; FW – Forward

No.	Pos	Nat	Player	Total		Third Division		FA Cup		League Cup	
No.	Pos	Nat	Player	Apps	Goals	Apps	Goals	Apps	Goals	Apps	Goals
	GK	(England) ENG	John Cooke	2	0	2	0	0	0	0	0
	GK	(England) ENG	Ken Hancock	50	0	44	0	5	0	1	0
	DF	(England) ENG	Terry Alcock	2	0	2	0	0	0	0	0
	DF	(England) ENG	Terry Lowe	3	0	3	0	0	0	0	0
	DF	(England) ENG	John Nicholson	52	0	46	0	5	0	1	0
	DF	(England) ENG	Roy Sproson	52	1	46	0	5	1	1	0
	DF	(England) ENG	Selwyn Whalley	47	1	41	0	5	1	1	0
	DF	(Scotland) SCO	Ron Wilson	28	0	24	0	4	0	0	0
	MF	(England) ENG	Colin Grainger	3	0	3	0	0	0	0	0
	MF	(England) ENG	Terry Miles	27	2	24	2	2	0	1	0
	MF	(England) ENG	Tim Rawlings	22	1	19	1	3	0	0	0
	MF	(England) ENG	Ron Smith	39	5	34	5	5	0	0	0
	FW	(Northern Ireland) NIR	Billy Bingham	38	7	35	6	2	1	1	0
	FW	(England) ENG	Albert Cheesebrough	27	7	25	6	1	1	1	0
	FW	(England) ENG	Barry Hancock	5	1	5	1	0	0	0	0
	FW	(Northern Ireland) NIR	Terry Harkin	11	2	10	1	0	0	1	1
	FW	(Scotland) SCO	Jackie Mudie	21	7	18	6	3	1	0	0
	FW	(England) ENG	Harry Poole	29	3	26	3	2	0	1	0
	FW	(England) ENG	Mick Porter	2	0	2	0	0	0	0	0
	FW	(England) ENG	Tony Richards	34	13	30	12	4	1	0	0
	FW	(England) ENG	John Rowland	28	4	23	4	4	0	1	0
	FW	(England) ENG	Stan Steele	50	6	44	5	5	1	1	0

=== Top scorers ===
Place	Position	Nation	Name	Third Division	FA Cup	League Cup	Total
1	FW	England	Tony Richards	12	1	0	13
2	FW	Scotland	Jackie Mudie	6	1	0	7
–	FW	Northern Ireland	Billy Bingham	6	1	0	7
–	FW	England	Albert Cheesebrough	6	1	0	7
5	FW	England	Stan Steele	5	1	0	6
6	MF	England	Ron Smith	5	0	0	5
7	FW	England	John Rowland	4	0	0	4
8	FW	England	Harry Poole	3	0	0	3
9	MF	England	Terry Miles	2	0	0	2
–	FW	Northern Ireland	Terry Harkin	1	0	1	2
11	FW	England	Barry Hancock	1	0	0	1
–	FW	England	Tim Rawlings	1	0	0	1
–	DF	England	Roy Sproson	0	1	0	1
–	DF	England	Selwyn Whalley	0	1	0	1
–	–	–	Own goals	1	0	0	1
			TOTALS	53	7	1	61

== Transfers ==
=== Transfers in ===
Date from	Position	Nationality	Name	From	Fee	Ref.
June 1963	MF	ENG	Tim Rawlings	Walsall	£4,000	
August 1963	FW	ENG	Albert Cheesebrough	Leicester City	£20,000	
August 1963	FW	NIR	Billy Bingham	Everton	£15,000	
October 1963	MF	ENG	Ron Smith	Crewe Alexandra	£6,500	
November 1963	FW	SCO	Jackie Mudie	Stoke City	£12,000	
November 1963	DF	SCO	Ron Wilson	Stoke City	£12,000	

=== Transfers out ===
Date from	Position	Nationality	Name	To	Fee	Ref.
May 1964	GK	ENG	John Cooke	Macclesfield Town	Free transfer	
July 1964	MF	NIR	Terry Harkin	Crewe Alexandra	£3,000	
July 1964	MF	ENG	Jim Watton	Doncaster Rovers	Free transfer	
Summer 1964	FW	ENG	Barry Hancock	Crewe Alexandra	Released	
