= Ron Smith (footballer, born 1936) =

English footballer (1936–2026)

Personal information
- Full name: Ronald Smith
- Date of birth: 7 June 1936
- Place of birth: Garston, Liverpool, England
- Date of death: 17 August 2026 (aged 90)
- Place of death: Liverpool, England
- Height: 5 ft 8 in (1.73 m)
- Position: Left winger

Youth career
- 1954: Stoke City
- 1955–1957: Liverpool

Senior career*
Years	Team	Apps	(Gls)
1957–1959	Liverpool	0	(0)
1959–1961	Bournemouth & Boscombe Athletic	36	(6)
1961–1963	Crewe Alexandra	90	(11)
1963–1965	Port Vale	59	(6)
1965–1967	Southport	79	(14)
1967–1970	Altrincham	93	(14)
1970–1971	Netherfield		
1971–1977	Formby		
1977–1980	Fleetwood Hesketh		
Total		357	(51)

Managerial career
- Formby
- * Club domestic league appearances and goals

Ronald Smith (7 June 1936 – 17 August 2026) was an English footballer who played on the left wing. He scored 63 goals in 429 appearances during his career.

Failing to make the grade at Liverpool, he transferred to Bournemouth & Boscombe Athletic in 1959. He spent two years with the club before moving to Crewe Alexandra in July 1961. He helped Crewe to win promotion out of the Fourth Division in 1962–63 before he was sold to Port Vale for a £6,500 fee in October 1963. In April 1965, he was allowed to join Southport, where he again won promotion out of the fourth tier in 1966–67. Following this, he joined Altrincham, where he lifted the Northern Premier League Challenge Cup in 1970. He later continued in non-League football with Netherfield, Formby and Fleetwood Hesketh.

== Career ==
=== Liverpool to Bournemouth ===
Ronald Smith was born in Garston, Liverpool on 7 June 1936 and attended Gilmour Secondary Modern school. He worked as a railway fireman after leaving school. He had trials with Aberdeen and Stoke City, but after his discharge from the King's Regiment during National service, he was signed to Liverpool on amateur terms in 1955. He turned professional in December 1957. He followed manager Don Welsh to Bournemouth & Boscombe Athletic in May 1959, having never turned out for the Liverpool first team. He made his debut for Bournemouth in the Third Division against Reading in October 1959. He scored three goals in ten games in 1959–60, two goals coming from penalty kicks. He scored four times in 30 games in 1960–61, before he was transferred to Fourth Division side Crewe Alexandra in July 1961.

=== Crewe Alexandra ===
Establishing himself in the first team at Gresty Road in 1961–62 by missing just three league games, he helped the club to win promotion in third place in 1962–63, scoring five goals in 40 league games. He played nine games in 1963–64 before he was once again moved on.

=== Port Vale ===
Smith was signed by Freddie Steele's Third Division Port Vale for £6,500 in October 1963. He was a regular from his inception in the side, and posted 39 appearances in 1963–64, scoring five goals. He helped the Valiants to beat Birmingham City 2–1 at St Andrew's in the third round of the FA Cup. He lost his first-team place on Boxing Day 1964 when he damaged an eye in a 3–0 defeat to Hull City. Upon his recovery he failed to regain his spot and was given a free transfer in April 1965, having scored twice in 28 appearances in 1964–65.

=== Southport ===
Smith moved on to Fourth Division Southport, who were managed by his former Vale teammate Billy Bingham. He was an ever-present in the 54 league and cup games of 1965–66 season, scoring twice in the FA Cup second round against Stockport County and then a goal in the 2–0 win over Second Division club Cardiff City in the fourth round. He helped the "Sandgrounders" to win promotion as runners-up in 1966–67, though he was dropped in February as Bingham began operating with Stuart Shaw as the sole winger. One of his six goals that season, against Chester, came from near the corner flag.

=== Later career ===
He was given a free transfer to Cheshire County League side Altrincham in 1967. After a second-place finish in 1967–68, the club became founder members of the Northern Premier League. He played 34 league games of the inaugural 1968–69 season before he won the Northern Premier League Challenge Cup with the club in 1970 after victory over Macclesfield Town. He left the club at the end of the 1969–70 campaign.

Upon leaving Moss Lane, he turned out for Netherfield, then moved to Formby. He left the club for Fleetwood Hesketh and became a dock worker. He stayed involved in Formby for many years, managing their reserves side, and later returned as first-team manager in the mid-1980s, steering them to their second Liverpool Senior Cup final in 1985. He began coaching in the United States from 1996.

== Death ==
Smith had dementia in later life and died on 17 August 2026, aged 90. He was predeceased by his wife of 66 years, Doreen, and left two sons, Paul and Colin.

== Career statistics ==
Appearances and goals by club, season and competition
Club	Season	League			FA Cup		League Cup		Other		Total	
Club	Season	Division	Apps	Goals	Apps	Goals	Apps	Goals	Apps	Goals	Apps	Goals
Liverpool	1957–58	Second Division	0	0	0	0	—		—		0	0
Liverpool	1958–59	Second Division	0	0	0	0	—		—		0	0
Liverpool	Total		0	0	0	0	0	0	0	0	0	0
Bournemouth & Boscombe Athletic	1959–60	Third Division	9	3	1	0	0	0	—		10	3
Bournemouth & Boscombe Athletic	1960–61	Third Division	27	3	2	1	1	0	—		30	4
Bournemouth & Boscombe Athletic	Total		36	6	3	1	1	0	0	0	40	7
Crewe Alexandra	1961–62	Fourth Division	41	6	3	2	1	0	—		45	8
Crewe Alexandra	1962–63	Fourth Division	40	5	3	0	0	0	—		43	5
Crewe Alexandra	1963–64	Third Division	9	0	0	0	0	0	—		9	0
Crewe Alexandra	Total		90	11	6	2	1	0	0	0	97	13
Port Vale	1963–64	Third Division	34	5	5	0	0	0	—		39	5
Port Vale	1964–65	Third Division	25	1	2	1	1	0	—		28	2
Port Vale	Total		59	6	7	1	1	0	0	0	67	7
Southport	1965–66	Fourth Division	46	8	7	3	1	0	—		54	11
Southport	1966–67	Fourth Division	33	6	1	0	0	0	—		34	6
Southport	Total		79	14	8	3	1	0	0	0	88	17
Altrincham	1967–68	Cheshire County League	34	8	1	0	—		12 (Note: Three appearances in Cheshire League Cup, three appearances in Cheshire Senior Cup, six appearances in North West Floodlit League)	0	47	8
Altrincham	1968–69	Northern Premier League	34	2	2	0	—		14 (Note: Five appearances and one goal in Northern Premier League Challenge Cup, one appearance and one goal in Cheshire Senior Cup, eight appearances and two goals in North West Floodlit League)	4	50	6
Altrincham	1969–70	Northern Premier League	25	4	1	0	—		14 (Note: Six appearances in Northern Premier League Challenge Cup, one appearance in FA Trophy, seven appearances and one goals in North West Floodlit League)	1	40	5
Altrincham	Total		93	14	4	0	0	0	40	5	137	19
Career total			357	51	28	7	4	0	40	5	429	63

== Honours ==
Crewe Alexandra

- Football League Fourth Division third-place promotion: 1962–63

Southport

- Football League Fourth Division second-place promotion: 1966–67

Altrincham

- Northern Premier League Challenge Cup: 1970
