= Ambrose Clarke =

English footballer

Amrose Clarke
Personal information
- Date of birth: 10 September 1945
- Place of birth: Liverpool, England
- Position: Wing half

Senior career*
Years	Team	Apps	(Gls)
1964–1965	Everton	0	(0)
1965–1971	Southport	197	(4)
1971–1972	Barrow	46	(0)
1972–1973	Skelmersdale United		
1973–1977	Formby		
- * Club domestic league appearances and goals

Ambrose "Amby" Clarke (born 10 September 1945) is a professional footballer who played as a wing half in the Football League for Southport and Barrow.

== League career ==
Growing up Peel Road, Bootle, Liverpool, Clarke started his football career in local amateur side Red Triangle before being signed up by Everton.

Amidst the high-flying side dubbed the 'Mersey Millionaires' he never made his mark and, aged 20, moved to Southport in January 1966, winning promotion to the Third Division with them at the end of that season. In five and a half years at Haig Avenue he was a virtual ever-present, making 197 league appearances and scoring four goals.

In 1970 Southport dropped back to the Fourth Division, and in the close season of 1971 Clarke transferred to another Fourth Division club, Barrow. He was also more or less an ever-present there, turning out for 46 appearances in 1971–72.

== Non-League ==
Barrow were relegated out of the League at the end of Clarke's season with them, at which point he moved to Skelmersdale United. Skem were having something of a heyday, having won the FA Amateur Cup in 1970–71 and been accepted into the Northern Premier League.

After playing the full 1972–73 season at Skelmersdale, Clarke signed for Formby as captain in the summer of 1973 and first pulled on a Formby shirt for a friendly at Tranmere Rovers F.C. on 30 July 1973. He was joined there in 1975 by an old Southport teammate, Ron Smith. Rarely missing a game, Clarke stayed with the Cheshire County League side until 1977.

He finished his playing career with Littlewoods Athletic in the Liverpool County Combination before retiring from football and launching a driving school.
