= Jim Watton =

English footballer

Personal information
- Full name: James Watton
- Date of birth: 1 November 1936 (age 89)
- Place of birth: Wolverhampton, England
- Position: Half-back

Senior career*
Years	Team	Apps	(Gls)
- Bromsgrove Rovers
- De Graafschap
1962–1964	Port Vale	5	(0)
1964–1968	Doncaster Rovers	123	(0)
- Burton Albion
Total		128+	(0+)
- * Club domestic league appearances and goals

James Watton (born 1 November 1936) is an English former footballer who played as a half-back. He made 129 league appearances in a six-year career in the Football League.

He began his career with English non-League side Bromsgrove Rovers and Dutch club De Graafschap before joining Port Vale in September 1962. He was allowed to move on to Doncaster Rovers in July 1964. He helped "Donny" to the Fourth Division title in 1965–66 before he left the club for non-League side Burton Albion in 1968.

== Career ==
Watton played for Bromsgrove Rovers and Dutch side De Graafschap before joining Norman Low's Port Vale in September 1962. He made his debut in a 1–0 win at Colchester United on 10 September 1962, but only made four further Third Division appearances that season. He did not appear under new boss Freddie Steele in the 1963–64 season, and left Vale Park for Doncaster Rovers in July 1964. Rovers finished ninth in the Fourth Division in 1964–65 under the stewardship of Bill Leivers, before winning the league in 1965–66 after finishing ahead of Darlington on goal difference. They could not survive in the league above under new boss Keith Kettleborough, however, and were relegated in 1966–67 after finishing nine points short of safety. They finished tenth in the Fourth Division in 1967–68 under the management of George Raynor. Watton then left Belle Vue and later played for Southern League side Burton Albion.

== Career statistics ==
Appearances and goals by club, season and competition
Club	Season	League			FA Cup		League Cup		Total	
Club	Season	Division	Apps	Goals	Apps	Goals	Apps	Goals	Apps	Goals
Port Vale	1962–63	Third Division	5	0	0	0	0	0	5	0
Port Vale	1963–64	Third Division	0	0	0	0	0	0	0	0
Port Vale	Total		5	0	0	0	0	0	5	0
Doncaster Rovers	1964–65	Fourth Division	46	0	4	0	3	0	53	0
Doncaster Rovers	1965–66	Fourth Division	32	0	0	0	3	0	35	0
Doncaster Rovers	1966–67	Third Division	39	0	2	0	6	0	47	0
Doncaster Rovers	1967–68	Fourth Division	6	0	0	0	1	0	7	0
Doncaster Rovers	Total		123	0	6	0	13	0	142	0
Career total			128	0	6	0	13	0	147	0

== Honours ==
Doncaster Rovers

- Football League Fourth Division: 1965–66
