= 1967–68 Cheshire County Football League =

Cheshire County League
- Season: 1967–68
- Champions: Macclesfield Town

The 1967–68 Cheshire County Football League was the 44th in the history of the Cheshire County League, a football competition in England.

== League table ==
Pos	Team	Pld	W	D	L	GF	GA	GR	Pts	Qualification or relegation
1	Macclesfield Town (C, P)	42	28	10	4	96	39	2.462	66	Founder member of Northern Premier League
2	Altrincham (P)	42	28	7	7	108	64	1.688	63	Founder member of Northern Premier League
3	Bangor City (P)	42	24	9	9	99	61	1.623	57	Founder member of Northern Premier League
4	Witton Albion	42	21	12	9	90	65	1.385	54	
5	Mossley	42	20	13	9	90	62	1.452	53	
6	Tranmere Rovers Reserves	42	22	6	14	71	50	1.420	50	
7	Northwich Victoria (P)	42	22	6	14	82	64	1.281	50	Founder member of Northern Premier League
8	Wigan Athletic (P)	42	18	12	12	62	48	1.292	48	Founder member of Northern Premier League
9	Stafford Rangers	42	18	11	13	88	58	1.517	47	
10	Hyde United (P)	42	17	12	13	97	74	1.311	46	Founder member of Northern Premier League
11	New Brighton	42	16	10	16	60	69	0.870	42	
12	Ellesmere Port Town	42	15	11	16	68	67	1.015	41	
13	Runcorn (P)	42	16	8	18	99	95	1.042	40	Founder member of Northern Premier League
14	Wrexham Reserves	42	16	8	18	72	77	0.935	40	Left the league
15	Buxton	42	14	8	20	71	86	0.826	36	
16	Rhyl	42	12	10	20	63	78	0.808	34	
17	Winsford United	42	13	7	22	50	82	0.610	33	
18	Oswestry Town	42	13	6	23	63	106	0.594	32	
19	Frickley Colliery	42	10	10	22	61	83	0.735	30	
20	Stockport County Reserves	42	10	7	25	55	92	0.598	27	Left the league
21	Stalybridge Celtic	42	6	14	22	54	93	0.581	26	
22	Chester Reserves	42	2	5	35	48	134	0.358	9	

Rules for classification: 1) points; 2) goal difference; 3) number of goals scored.
The points system until the 1990–91 season: 2 points for a win, 1 point for a draw and 0 points for losing.
(C) Champions; (P) Promoted
