= Barry Hancock =

English footballer

Personal information
- Full name: Barry John Hancock
- Date of birth: 30 December 1938
- Place of birth: Hanley, Stoke-on-Trent, England
- Date of death: 10 September 2013 (aged 74)
- Position: Inside forward

Youth career
- Birches Head R.C.

Senior career*
Years	Team	Apps	(Gls)
1954–1964	Port Vale	21	(1)
1964–1965	Crewe Alexandra	3	(0)
- Stafford Rangers
- All Blacks
Total		24+	(1+)
- * Club domestic league appearances and goals

Barry John Hancock (30 December 1938 – 10 September 2013) was an English footballer who played as an inside-forward. He played 24 league games in the English Football League for Port Vale and Crewe Alexandra from 1961 to 1965.

== Career ==
Hancock supported Port Vale since childhood and also spent matchdays working as a matchday programme seller at Vale Park. He managed to join the club as an amateur after a time with Birches Head R.C. He signed as a professional in July 1957 and finally made his debut on 24 April 1961 against Potteries derby rivals Stoke City in the (replayed) final of the Supporters' Clubs' Trophy in 1961. He played two Third Division games in 1960–61, though Norman Low played him just six times in 1961–62. He impressed in league FA Cup games against Bradford Park Avenue, but had to reject an approach to join the club by player-manager Jimmy Scoular as Vale retained his registration. He featured nine times at Vale Park in 1962–63, before scoring his first and only senior goal on 9 September 1963, in a 1–1 draw with Mansfield Town at Field Mill, in one of only five appearances for the "Valiants" in 1963–64; Hancock was released by manager Freddie Steele at the end of the season. He moved on to Crewe Alexandra, playing three Fourth Division games in 1964–65, and later played for non-League Stafford Rangers. He later played for All Blacks before going back to Birches Head R.C. as a referee. After retiring, he once more became a programme distributor at Vale Park.

== Career statistics ==
Appearances and goals by club, season and competition
Club	Season	League			FA Cup		League Cup		Total	
Club	Season	Division	Apps	Goals	Apps	Goals	Apps	Goals	Apps	Goals
Port Vale	1960–61	Third Division	2	0	0	0	0	0	2	0
Port Vale	1961–62	Third Division	5	0	1	0	0	0	6	0
Port Vale	1962–63	Third Division	9	0	0	0	0	0	9	0
Port Vale	1963–64	Third Division	5	1	0	0	0	0	5	1
Port Vale	Total		21	1	1	0	0	0	22	1
Crewe Alexandra	1964–65	Fourth Division	3	0	0	0	1	0	4	0
Career total			24	1	1	0	1	0	26	1
