= Reg Davies (footballer, born 1933) =

English footballer (1933–2019)

Personal information
- Full name: Reginald Walter Davies
- Date of birth: 10 October 1933
- Place of birth: Tipton, England
- Date of death: September 2019 (aged 85)
- Position: Goalkeeper

Senior career*
Years	Team	Apps	(Gls)
1953–1955	West Bromwich Albion	4	(0)
1955–1957	Walsall	53	(0)
1957–1963	Millwall	199	(0)
1963–1964	Leyton Orient	11	(0)
1964–1965	Port Vale	12	(0)
1965–1966	Leyton Orient	16	(0)
Total		295	(0)
- * Club domestic league appearances and goals

Reginald Walter Davies (10 October 1933 – September 2019) was an English football goalkeeper who played 296 league games in a 13-year career in the Football League with West Bromwich Albion, Walsall, Millwall Leyton Orient, and Port Vale. He won the Fourth Division title with Millwall in 1961–62.

== Career ==
Davies began his career at West Bromwich Albion, just as Vic Buckingham's "Baggies" finished second in the First Division in 1953–54, four points behind champions Wolverhampton Wanderers. They then finished a disappointing 17th in 1954–55. Davies played only four league games at The Hawthorns and moved on to Walsall, who were struggling near the foot of the Third Division South. John Love's "Saddlers" finished 20th in 1955–56 and 15th in 1956–57, with Davies playing 53 league games at Fellows Park. He then moved on to league rivals Millwall in May 1958, who had finished in 23rd place in 1957–58 to become founder members of the Fourth Division. Jimmy Seed's "Lions" posted a ninth-place finish in 1958–59, before finishing just four points outside the promotion places in 1959–60 under the stewardship of Reg Smith. They ended the 1960–61 campaign in sixth place, though were this time ten points short of the promotion zone. Promotion was finally won in style, as manager Ron Gray – the man who originally signed Davies to the club – returned to lead Millwall to the title in 1961–62, one point ahead of Colchester United. They ended the 1962–63 campaign in 16th place in the Third Division. Davies played 211 league and cup games during his six years at The Den and was nicknamed "The Cat" by supporters. He moved on to Benny Fenton's Leyton Orient in July 1963, and played 11 Second Division games in the 1963–64 season. He signed with Freddie Steele's Port Vale in July 1964. After winning his first-team place from Ken Hancock, he was the "Valiants" number 1 between November 1964 and February 1965, before he was replaced by new manager Jackie Mudie's signing Jimmy O'Neill. He played 14 league and FA Cup games in the season, as Vale were relegated out of the Third Division. He left Vale Park and returned to Brisbane Road in March 1965 for a small fee. He played 16 league games as Dave Sexton's Orient were relegated out of the Second Division at the end of the 1965–66 season, and Davies then retired from the Football League.

== Style of play ==
Davies was a muscular and agile goalkeeper.

== Later life ==
He later worked at Jersey Airport and completed his national service with Royal Artillery. He died in September 2019, aged 85.

== Career statistics ==
Appearances and goals by club, season and competition
Club	Season	League			FA Cup		League Cup		Total	
Club	Season	Division	Apps	Goals	Apps	Goals	Apps	Goals	Apps	Goals
West Bromwich Albion	1953–54	First Division	1	0	0	0	—		1	0
West Bromwich Albion	1954–55	First Division	3	0	1	0	—		4	0
West Bromwich Albion	Total		4	0	1	0	0	0	5	0
Walsall	1955–56	Third Division South	33	0	4	0	—		37	0
Walsall	1956–57	Third Division South	20	0	1	0	—		21	0
Walsall	Total		53	0	5	0	0	0	58	0
Millwall	1958–59	Fourth Division	35	0	3	0	—		38	0
Millwall	1959–60	Fourth Division	46	0	1	0	—		47	0
Millwall	1960–61	Fourth Division	41	0	0	0	1	0	42	0
Millwall	1961–62	Fourth Division	43	0	1	0	2	0	46	0
Millwall	1962–63	Third Division	34	0	3	0	1	0	38	0
Millwall	Total		199	0	8	0	4	0	211	0
Leyton Orient	1963–64	Second Division	11	0	0	0	1	0	12	0
Port Vale	1964–65	Third Division	12	0	1	0	0	0	13	0
Leyton Orient	1964–65	Second Division	11	0	0	0	0	0	11	0
Leyton Orient	1965–66	Second Division	5	0	0	0	0	0	5	0
Leyton Orient	Total		16	0	0	0	0	0	16	0
Career total			295	0	15	0	5	0	315	0

== Honours ==
West Bromwich Albion

- Football League First Division second-place promotion: 1953–54

Millwall

- Football League Fourth Division: 1961–62
