= Bernard Wright (footballer) =

Northern Irish footballer

Personal information
- Full name: Bernard Anthony Wright
- Date of birth: 8 June 1940 (age 86)
- Place of birth: Derry, Northern Ireland
- Position: Right winger

Youth career
- Sligo Rovers

Senior career*
Years	Team	Apps	(Gls)
1962–1963	Port Vale	14	(2)
- → Stafford Rangers (loan)
- * Club domestic league appearances and goals

Bernard Anthony Wright (born 8 June 1940) is a Northern Irish former footballer. In English football, he was nicknamed "Paddy". He played on the right-wing for Sligo Rovers, Port Vale, and Stafford Rangers.

== Career ==
Wright played for Sligo Rovers before crossing the Irish Sea to try his luck in England with Norman Low's Port Vale in August 1962. He replaced John Rowland as the Vale's number 7, but in November new manager Freddie Steele dropped Wright for Rowland. He made 14 Third Division and one League Cup appearances for the "Valiants", and scored goals in a 1–0 win over Colchester United at Layer Road (10 September) and a 2–1 win over Watford at Vicarage Road (18 May). Wright was loaned out to Stafford Rangers in April 1963, before leaving Vale Park on a free transfer the next month.

== Career statistics ==
Appearances and goals by club, season and competition
Club	Season	League			FA Cup		League Cup		Total	
Club	Season	Division	Apps	Goals	Apps	Goals	Apps	Goals	Apps	Goals
Port Vale	1962–63	Third Division	14	2	0	0	1	0	15	2
