= 1964–65 Port Vale F.C. season =

Port Vale F.C.
1964–65 season
- Chairman: Tom Talbot
- Manager: Freddie Steele (until February); Jackie Mudie (from February)
- Stadium: Vale Park
- Football League Third Division: 22nd (32 points)
- FA Cup: Second Round (eliminated by Millwall)
- League Cup: First Round (eliminated by Luton Town)
- Top goalscorer: League: Albert Cheesebrough (7); All: Albert Cheesebrough (7)
- Highest home attendance: 8,190 vs. Colchester United, 29 August 1964
- Lowest home attendance: 3,071 vs. Bournemouth & Boscombe Athletic, 13 February 1965
- Average home league attendance: 5,508
- Biggest win: 2–0 (four games)
- Biggest defeat: 0–4 (five games)
Home colours

The 1964–65 season was Port Vale's 53rd season of football in the English Football League, and their sixth season in the Third Division. Under manager Freddie Steele (until February) and chairman Tom Talbot, the club endured a disastrous league season, finishing 22nd with 32 points, resulting in relegation to the Fourth Division.

Offensively, Vale were the poorest scorers in the entire Football League, mustering just 41 goals in 46 games, with Albert Cheesebrough topping the charts with a mere seven goals in both league and overall tallies. A club record run of 13 home matches without a clean sheet, stretching from 26 September to 15 March, highlighted defensive woes. The season began poorly and Steele departed by mutual consent in February 1965, with veteran forward Jackie Mudie stepping in as caretaker manager and igniting a brief revival. However, Vale remained five points adrift of safety, and relegation could not be avoided.

In cup competitions, Vale exited the FA Cup in the Second Round, losing to Millwall, and were knocked out of the League Cup in the First Round. Home attendance averaged 5,508, with the highest gate recorded at 8,190 for the opening home fixture against Colchester United on 29 August 1964.

Overall, the 1964–65 season was marked by managerial upheaval and poor results, culminating in relegation and the club's worst-ever goalscoring record.

== Overview ==
=== Third Division ===
The pre-season saw manager Freddie Steele attempt to sign legendary Spurs striker Bobby Smith, this audacious attempt failed partly due to the financially precarious situation the club found itself in after the previous season. Instead Steele signed Ron Andrew from Stoke City for £3,000, as well as goalkeeper Reg Davies from Leyton Orient.

The season began with a 4–1 beating at Borough Park from newly-promoted Workington after Tony Richards found himself sidelined following an insect bite. They picked up just three points in their next six league games. The fans were already showing their disappointment in the team 20 minutes before the end of the first home game – a 2–1 defeat to Colchester United. Ken Hancock and Jackie Mudie were both dropped following this game. Richards made his return only to suffer a knee injury which required surgery, thereby keeping him out of action for the rest of the campaign. On 5 September, Billy Bingham had played his last game, as he broke his leg in a 4–0 beating by Brentford at Griffin Park. Two successive mid-September 1–0 victories (both goals scored by Albert Cheesebrough) were rare bright rays of sunshine for the "Valiants". A 'punchless' and 'guileless' run of twelve games without a win followed, which saw the club drop to third from bottom, as attendances tailed off accordingly. On 5 October, a mere 4,247 turned out to witness a 2–2 draw with Mansfield Town. Cheeseborough also picked up an injury, whilst Mudie found he was now unable to play on hard surfaces. Reserves filled the gaps in the first XI as at Vale Park "the loud mouths on the terraces certainly did a good job [of] hindering Stan Trafford" on his home debut on 17 October. Goals in short supply, numerous players were tried in the centre-forward role, to no avail.

On 21 November, Vale picked up their third league win of the campaign, beating lowly Barnsley 2–0 at Oakwell. Youth players continued to be drafted in as Vale finished the year with four straight league defeats, picking up injuries and sendings off along the way. In December, Ken Hancock was sold to Ipswich Town for £10,000 to balance the books following sliding attendance figures. The club gave a debut to 16-year-old Clint Boulton on Boxing Day, a 3–0 defeat to Hull City in which Ron Smith damaged his eye. Steele made nine changes for the return fixture two days later, which ended in a 4–0 defeat after Cheesebrough was sent off on 30 minutes for arguing with the referee. A 2–1 victory over promotion-chasers Brentford on 2 January failed to spark a revival, partly because the Bees were forced to play almost the entire match with ten players and an outside player in goal following an injury to Chic Brodie. Steele tried to play a settled team, but that proved to be as unsuccessful as when he switched the team round constantly. By the end of the month the club were bottom of the league and morale was low. On 16 January, Stan Steele broke his toe in a 4–0 defeat at Bristol Rovers as the team's "defensive weaknesses were glaring exposed".

In mid-February, the club four points short of safety, Freddie Steele left the club by mutual consent, as Jackie Mudie was appointed caretaker manager. Following a 4–0 hammering from Gillingham, Mudie signed veteran stopper Jimmy O'Neill from Darlington, and the former Ireland international seemed to improve the team, as just two defeats in eight games followed after he replaced regular custodian Reg Davies. Mudie instilled discipline into the team, and so was made manager permanently on 3 March. He then ensured Reg Davies was transferred to Leyton Orient. He tried and failed to re-sign Terry Harkin from Crewe Alexandra. One win in their final six games doomed the Vale to relegation, just as survival seemed possible. Only 3,521 witnessed a final day victory over Walsall.

They finished in twenty-second position, their 32 points five short of safety. Losing ten home games, they recorded just two wins on their travels. No team in the top four divisions scored fewer than Vale's 41 goals, as Cheeseborough took the honour of top-scorer with a mere seven goals – this was the lowest total for a Vale top-scorer in a Football League season since Meshach Dean scored six in 1892–93 (in a 22-game league season). The club embarked on a post-season tour of Germany, where they played SC Tasmania 1900 Berlin at the Poststadion on 15 June.

=== Finances ===
On the financial side, £15,497 was recorded despite a £16,320 donation from the Sportsmen's Association, the Development Fund, and the social club. The average home attendance was a mere 5,508, almost half that of the previous season. Gate receipts had plummeted to just £24,117, compared to a wage bill of £41,092; meanwhile, a £6,250 profit was made on transfers. A clear-out of players could not be avoided, as twelve were handed free transfers, including: Billy Bingham (retired); Stan Steele (left the country); Ron Smith (Southport); Ron Andrew (retired); Tim Rawlings (Nuneaton Borough); Stan Trafford (retired); and Albert Cheesebrough (joined Mansfield Town for free, although Vale had wanted £5,000 for him).

=== Cup competitions ===
In the FA Cup, Vale made 'an inglorious passage' past amateurs Hendon of the Isthmian League with a difficult 2–1 victory. Fourth Division club Millwall proved to be too tough an opponent in the second round however, as the "Lions" picked up a 'decisive' 4–0 win at The Den.

Once again, the club exited at the first hurdle in the League Cup, this time losing 1–0 at home to Luton Town with 18-year-old David Mitchell at centre-forward.

== Results ==
=== Football League Third Division ===
==== League table ====
Pos	Team	Pld	W	D	L	GF	GA	GAv	Pts	Promotion or relegation
20	Oldham Athletic	46	13	10	23	61	83	0.735	36	
21	Luton Town (R)	46	11	11	24	51	94	0.543	33	Relegation to the Fourth Division
22	Port Vale (R)	46	9	14	23	41	76	0.539	32	Relegation to the Fourth Division
23	Colchester United (R)	46	10	10	26	50	89	0.562	30	Relegation to the Fourth Division
24	Barnsley (R)	46	9	11	26	54	90	0.600	29	Relegation to the Fourth Division

(R) Relegated

==== Results by matchday ====
Round	1	2	3	4	5	6	7	8	9	10	11	12	13	14	15	16	17	18	19	20	21	22	23	24	25	26	27	28	29	30	31	32	33	34	35	36	37	38	39	40	41	42	43	44	45	46
Ground	A	A	H	H	A	A	H	H	A	H	A	A	H	A	A	H	H	A	H	H	A	A	H	A	H	A	H	H	A	A	A	H	H	A	A	H	H	A	H	H	A	A	H	H	A	H
Result	L	D	L	L	L	D	D	W	W	L	D	L	D	L	D	L	L	L	D	D	D	W	L	L	L	L	W	D	L	D	L	L	L	L	D	W	W	L	W	W	D	L	D	L	L	W
Position	19	17	22	22	24	24	22	19	18	20	18	21	20	20	21	20	20	21	21	22	22	21	21	23	24	24	23	23	23	24	24	24	24	24	24	24	24	24	23	23	23	23	23	23	23	22
Points	0	1	1	1	1	2	3	5	7	7	8	8	9	9	10	10	10	10	11	12	13	15	15	15	15	15	17	18	18	19	19	19	19	19	20	22	24	24	26	28	29	29	30	30	30	32

Source: Statto
A = Away; H = Home; W = Win; D = Draw; L = Loss

==== Matches ====
22 August 1964 1	Workington	4–1	Port Vale	Workington
		Report	Andrew	Stadium: Borough Park; Attendance: 5,228

24 August 1964 2	Carlisle United	1–1	Port Vale	Carlisle
		Report	Cheesebrough	Stadium: Brunton Park; Attendance: 11,809

29 August 1964 3	Port Vale	1–2	Colchester United	Burslem
	Poole 20'	Report	Stark 24'; Salisbury 26'	Stadium: Vale Park; Attendance: 8,190

31 August 1964 4	Port Vale	1–3	Carlisle United	Burslem
	Cheesebrough	Report		Stadium: Vale Park; Attendance: 8,003

5 September 1964 5	Brentford	4–0	Port Vale	Brentford, West London
		Report		Stadium: Griffin Park; Attendance: 8,397

9 September 1964 6	Luton Town	1–1	Port Vale	Luton
		Report	Poole	Stadium: Kenilworth Road; Attendance: 11,649

12 September 1964 7	Port Vale	1–1	Bristol Rovers	Burslem
	Steele	Report		Stadium: Vale Park; Attendance: 7,571

14 September 1964 8	Port Vale	1–0	Luton Town	Burslem
	Cheesebrough	Report		Stadium: Vale Park; Attendance: 6,381

19 September 1964 9	Oldham Athletic	0–1	Port Vale	Oldham
		Report	Cheesebrough	Stadium: Boundary Park; Attendance: 9,575

26 September 1964 10	Port Vale	0–1	Exeter City	Burslem
		Report	Banks	Stadium: Vale Park; Attendance: 7,006; Referee: J.Catlin

28 September 1964 11	Mansfield Town	2–2	Port Vale	Mansfield
	Scanlon; Graham	Report	Porter; Mitchell	Stadium: Field Mill; Attendance: 10,709

3 October 1964 12	Bournemouth & Boscombe Athletic	3–0	Port Vale	Bournemouth
		Report		Stadium: Dean Court; Attendance: 8,609

5 October 1964 13	Port Vale	2–2	Mansfield Town	Burslem
	Rowland; Cheesebrough	Report	B Hall; Cooper	Stadium: Vale Park; Attendance: 4,247

10 October 1964 14	Gillingham	2–0	Port Vale	Gillingham, Kent
		Report		Stadium: Priestfield Stadium; Attendance: 8,839

12 October 1964 15	Peterborough United	2–2	Port Vale	Peterborough
	Smith; Deakin	Report	Miles	Stadium: London Road Stadium; Attendance: 9,878; Referee: D. Wells

17 October 1964 16	Port Vale	1–2	Bristol City	Burslem
	Miles	Report		Stadium: Vale Park; Attendance: 5,564

19 October 1964 17	Port Vale	0–1	Peterborough United	Burslem
		Report	Barnes	Stadium: Vale Park; Attendance: 6,110; Referee: L. Hamer

23 October 1964 18	Queens Park Rangers	3–1	Port Vale	Shepherd's Bush, West London
	I. Morgan; R. Morgan; Bedford	Report	Machin	Stadium: Loftus Road; Attendance: 4,489

26 October 1964 19	Port Vale	2–2	Watford	Burslem
	Machin; Rawlings	Report	McAnearney; Oliver	Stadium: Vale Park; Attendance: 5,271

31 October 1964 20	Port Vale	1–1	Shrewsbury Town	Burslem
	Mitchell	Report		Stadium: Vale Park; Attendance: 6,363

7 November 1964 21	Reading	1–1	Port Vale	Reading, Berkshire
		Report	Mudie	Stadium: Elm Park; Attendance: 7,360

21 November 1964 22	Barnsley	0–2	Port Vale	Barnsley
		Report	Porter; Smith	Stadium: Oakwell; Attendance: 5,288

28 November 1964 23	Port Vale	0–1	Scunthorpe United	Burslem
		Report		Stadium: Vale Park; Attendance: 4,620

19 December 1964 24	Colchester United	2–0	Port Vale	Colchester
	Langley; Trevis	Report		Stadium: Layer Road; Attendance: 2,528

26 December 1964 25	Port Vale	0–3	Hull City	Burslem
15:15 GMT		Report	Clarke 9'; Wagstaff 34'; Chilton 70'	Stadium: Vale Park; Attendance: 6,099

28 December 1964 26	Hull City	4–0	Port Vale	Kingston upon Hull
15:00 GMT	Wagstaff 12', 63', 79'; Henderson 27'	Report		Stadium: Boothferry Park; Attendance: 12,468

2 January 1965 27	Port Vale	2–1	Brentford	Burslem
	Miles; Mudie	Report	Lawther	Stadium: Vale Park; Attendance: 4,533

8 January 1965 28	Port Vale	2–2	Southend United	Burslem
	Rowland (pen.); Miles	Report		Stadium: Vale Park; Attendance: 4,852

16 January 1965 29	Bristol Rovers	4–0	Port Vale	Bristol
		Report		Stadium: Eastville Stadium; Attendance: 10,011

30 January 1965 30	Walsall	0–0	Port Vale	Walsall
		Report		Stadium: Fellows Park; Attendance: 7,324

6 February 1965 31	Exeter City	2–1	Port Vale	Exeter
	Banks	Report	Poole	Stadium: St James Park; Attendance: 5,465; Referee: T.Wells; Assistant referees: A. Newman, E.Garfield

13 February 1965 32	Port Vale	1–2	Bournemouth & Boscombe Athletic	Burslem
	Mitchell	Report		Stadium: Vale Park; Attendance: 3,071

20 February 1965 33	Port Vale	0–4	Gillingham	Burslem
		Report		Stadium: Vale Park; Attendance: 4,203

27 February 1965 34	Bristol City	3–0	Port Vale	Ashton Gate, Bristol
		Report		Stadium: Ashton Gate; Attendance: 8,552

13 March 1965 35	Shrewsbury Town	0–0	Port Vale	Shrewsbury
		Report		Stadium: Gay Meadow; Attendance: 5,546

15 March 1965 36	Port Vale	2–1	Oldham Athletic	Burslem
	Cheesebrough; Trafford	Report		Stadium: Vale Park; Attendance: 5,057

20 March 1965 37	Port Vale	2–0	Reading	Burslem
	Machin; Steele	Report		Stadium: Vale Park; Attendance: 4,162

26 March 1965 38	Southend United	2–1	Port Vale	Southend-on-Sea
		Report	Cheesebrough	Stadium: Roots Hall; Attendance: 6,017

29 March 1965 39	Port Vale	2–0	Workington	Burslem
	Steele; Rowland	Report		Stadium: Vale Park; Attendance: 7,175

3 April 1965 40	Port Vale	2–0	Barnsley	Burslem
	(og.); Machin	Report		Stadium: Vale Park; Attendance: 6,311

9 April 1965 41	Scunthorpe United	0–0	Port Vale	Scunthorpe
		Report		Stadium: Old Show Ground; Attendance: 3,894

16 April 1965 42	Grimsby Town	2–0	Port Vale	Cleethorpes
		Report		Stadium: Blundell Park; Attendance: 8,325

17 April 1965 43	Port Vale	0–0	Queens Park Rangers	Burslem
		Report		Stadium: Vale Park; Attendance: 4,816

20 April 1965 44	Port Vale	2–3	Grimsby Town	Burslem
	Rowland	Report		Stadium: Vale Park; Attendance: 3,569

24 April 1965 45	Watford	1–0	Port Vale	Watford
	Harris	Report		Stadium: Vicarage Road; Attendance: 7,627

26 April 1965 46	Port Vale	2–1	Walsall	Burslem
	Boulton; Bannister	Report		Stadium: Vale Park; Attendance: 3,521

=== FA Cup ===
14 November 1964 R1	Port Vale	2–1	Hendon	Burslem
	Smith; Mitchell	Report		Stadium: Vale Park; Attendance: 8,039

5 December 1964 R2	Millwall	4–0	Port Vale	New Cross, Lewisham
	Julians (o.g.); Whitehouse (2)	Report		Stadium: The Den; Attendance: 7,521

=== League Cup ===
7 September 1964 R1	Port Vale	0–1	Luton Town	Burslem
		Report		Stadium: Vale Park; Attendance: 5,111

== Squad statistics ==
=== Appearances and goals ===
Key to positions: GK – Goalkeeper; DF – Defender; MF – Midfielder; FW – Forward

No.	Pos	Nat	Player	Total		Third Division		FA Cup		League Cup	
No.	Pos	Nat	Player	Apps	Goals	Apps	Goals	Apps	Goals	Apps	Goals
	GK	(Republic of Ireland) IRL	Jimmy O'Neill	13	0	13	0	0	0	0	0
	GK	(England) ENG	Ken Oxford	0	0	0	0	0	0	0	0
	DF	(England) ENG	Terry Alcock	31	0	28	0	2	0	1	0
	DF	(England) ENG	Clint Boulton	5	1	5	1	0	0	0	0
	DF	(England) ENG	Terry Lowe	2	0	2	0	0	0	0	0
	DF	(England) ENG	John Nicholson	49	0	46	0	2	0	1	0
	DF	(England) ENG	Roy Sproson	48	0	45	0	2	0	1	0
	DF	(England) ENG	Selwyn Whalley	16	0	15	0	1	0	0	0
	DF	(Scotland) SCO	Ron Wilson	23	0	21	0	2	0	0	0
	MF	(England) ENG	Ron Andrew	8	1	8	1	0	0	0	0
	MF	(England) ENG	Mel Machin	12	4	11	4	1	0	0	0
	MF	(England) ENG	Terry Miles	35	5	33	5	1	0	1	0
	MF	(England) ENG	Tim Rawlings	14	1	12	1	1	0	1	0
	MF	(England) ENG	Ron Smith	28	2	25	1	2	1	1	0
	FW	(England) ENG	Paul Bannister	2	1	2	1	0	0	0	0
	FW	(Northern Ireland) NIR	Billy Bingham	5	0	5	0	0	0	0	0
	FW	(England) ENG	Albert Cheesebrough	32	7	32	7	0	0	0	0
	FW	(England) ENG	David Mitchell	19	4	17	3	1	1	1	0
	FW	(Scotland) SCO	Jackie Mudie	19	2	18	2	1	0	0	0
	FW	(England) ENG	Harry Poole	39	3	37	3	1	0	1	0
	FW	(England) ENG	Mick Porter	12	2	11	2	0	0	1	0
	FW	(England) ENG	Tony Richards	1	0	1	0	0	0	0	0
	FW	(England) ENG	John Rowland	43	5	40	5	2	0	1	0
	FW	(England) ENG	Stan Steele	35	3	34	3	1	0	0	0
	FW	(England) ENG	Stan Trafford	12	1	12	1	0	0	0	0
Players who featured but departed the club during the season:
	GK	(England) ENG	Reg Davies	13	0	12	0	1	0	0	0
	GK	(England) ENG	Ken Hancock	22	0	20	0	1	0	1	0

=== Top scorers ===
Place	Position	Nation	Name	Third Division	FA Cup	League Cup	Total
1	FW	England	Albert Cheesebrough	7	0	0	7
2	MF	England	Terry Miles	5	0	0	5
–	FW	England	John Rowland	5	0	0	5
4	MF	England	Mel Machin	4	0	0	4
–	FW	England	David Mitchell	3	1	0	4
6	FW	England	Harry Poole	3	0	0	3
–	FW	England	Stan Steele	3	0	0	3
8	FW	England	Mick Porter	2	0	0	2
–	FW	Scotland	Jackie Mudie	2	0	0	2
–	MF	England	Ron Smith	1	1	0	2
11	FW	Northern Ireland	Stan Trafford	1	0	0	1
–	MF	England	Tim Rawlings	1	0	0	1
–	FW	England	Paul Bannister	1	0	0	1
–	DF	England	Clint Boulton	1	0	0	1
–	MF	England	Ron Andrew	1	0	0	1
–	–	–	Own goals	1	0	0	1
			TOTALS	41	2	0	43

== Transfers ==
=== Transfers in ===
Date from	Position	Nationality	Name	From	Fee	Ref.
June 1964	DF	ENG	Ron Andrew	Stoke City	£3,000	
July 1964	GK	ENG	Reg Davies	Leyton Orient	Free transfer	
February 1965	GK	IRL	Jimmy O'Neill	Darlington	Free transfer	

=== Transfers out ===
Date from	Position	Nationality	Name	To	Fee	Ref.
August 1964	MF	ENG	Colin Grainger	Doncaster Rovers	Free transfer	
December 1964	GK	ENG	Ken Hancock	Ipswich Town	£10,000	
March 1965	GK	ENG	Reg Davies	Leyton Orient	'small'	
April 1965	DF	ENG	Ron Andrew		Free transfer	
April 1965	FW	NIR	Billy Bingham	Southport	Free transfer	
April 1965	FW	ENG	Mick Porter	Portmadoc	Free transfer	
April 1965	MF	ENG	Tim Rawlings	Nuneaton Borough	Free transfer	
April 1965	MF	ENG	Ron Smith	Southport	Free transfer	
April 1965	FW	ENG	Stan Steele	(South Africa) Port Elizabeth City	Free transfer	
April 1965	FW	ENG	Stan Trafford		Released	
July 1965	FW	ENG	Albert Cheesebrough	Mansfield Town	Free transfer	
