= 1967–68 Lancashire Combination =

Lancashire Combination
- Season: 1967–68
- Champions: Morecambe

The 1967–68 Lancashire Combination was the 67th in the history of the Lancashire Combination, a football competition in England.

== Division One ==
Lancashire Combination Division One
- Season: 1967–68
- Champions: Morecambe

=== League table ===
Pos	Team	Pld	W	D	L	GF	GA	GR	Pts	Qualification
1	Morecambe (C, P)	42	28	9	5	112	41	2.732	65	Founder member of Northern Premier League
2	Guinness Exports	42	29	6	7	85	37	2.297	64	Joined Cheshire County League
3	Skelmersdale United	42	23	10	9	94	49	1.918	56	Joined Cheshire County League
4	Fleetwood (P)	42	22	10	10	72	43	1.674	54	Founder member of Northern Premier League
5	Marine	42	21	10	11	78	60	1.300	52	
6	Great Harwood	42	20	11	11	71	50	1.420	51	
7	South Liverpool (P)	42	21	7	14	76	53	1.434	49	Founder member of Northern Premier League
8	Netherfield (P)	42	20	9	13	103	88	1.170	49	Founder member of Northern Premier League
9	Horwich RMI	42	19	9	14	79	52	1.519	47	Joined Cheshire County League
10	Lancaster City	42	18	11	13	72	67	1.075	47	
11	Chorley (P)	42	17	9	16	72	65	1.108	43	Founder member of Northern Premier League
12	St Helens Town	42	16	8	18	68	65	1.046	40	
13	Kirkby Town	42	13	13	16	54	60	0.900	39	
14	Burscough	42	13	10	19	53	64	0.828	36	
15	Droylsden	42	13	10	19	52	84	0.619	36	Joined Cheshire County League
16	Wigan Rovers	42	14	6	22	56	69	0.812	34	
17	Clitheroe	42	14	6	22	58	86	0.674	34	
18	Southport Reserves	42	12	9	21	59	66	0.894	33	Left the league
19	Barrow Reserves	42	13	4	25	55	78	0.705	30	
20	Prescot Town	42	12	1	29	53	109	0.486	25	
21	Bacup Borough	42	8	6	28	34	105	0.324	22	
22	Rossendale United	42	6	6	30	50	115	0.435	18	

Rules for classification: 1) points; 2) goal difference; 3) number of goals scored.
The points system until the 1990–91 season: 2 points for a win, 1 point for a draw and 0 points for losing.
(C) Champions; (P) Promoted

== Division Two ==
Lancashire Combination Division Two
- Season: 1967–68
- Champions: Oldham Athletic Reserves
- Promoted: Darwen; Radcliffe Borough; Leyland Motors; Dukinfield Town; Blackpool Mechanics; Wigan Athletic Reserves; Nelson; Lytham

=== League table ===
Pos	Team	Pld	W	D	L	GF	GA	GR	Pts	Promotion or relegation
1	Oldham Athletic Reserves (C)	32	23	7	2	102	21	4.857	53	Left the league
2	Darwen (P)	32	21	6	5	72	35	2.057	48	Promotion to Lancashire Combination
3	Morecambe Reserves	32	17	7	8	77	50	1.540	41	Left the league
4	Ashton United	32	17	5	10	67	52	1.288	39	Joined Cheshire County League
5	Radcliffe Borough (P)	32	17	4	11	62	52	1.192	38	Promotion to Lancashire Combination
6	Leyland Motors (P)	32	15	5	12	55	66	0.833	35	Promotion to Lancashire Combination
7	Dukinfield Town (P)	32	14	5	13	69	54	1.278	33	Promotion to Lancashire Combination
8	Chorley Reserves	32	13	7	12	68	55	1.236	33	Left the league
9	Fleetwood Reserves	32	13	7	12	71	71	1.000	33	Left the league
10	Blackpool Mechanics (P)	32	11	8	13	62	58	1.069	30	Promotion to Lancashire Combination
11	Wigan Athletic Reserves (P)	32	13	3	16	67	66	1.015	29	Promotion to Lancashire Combination
12	Nelson (P)	32	12	5	15	63	67	0.940	29	Promotion to Lancashire Combination
13	Netherfield Reserves	32	8	6	18	63	92	0.685	22	Left the league
14	Lancaster City Reserves	32	8	6	18	45	85	0.529	22	Left the league
15	Lytham (P)	32	7	7	18	42	82	0.512	21	Promotion to Lancashire Combination
16	Horwich RMI Reserves	32	5	9	18	50	82	0.610	19	Left the league
17	Padiham	32	7	5	20	43	90	0.478	19	Left the league

Rules for classification: 1) points; 2) goal difference; 3) number of goals scored.
The points system until the 1990–91 season: 2 points for a win, 1 point for a draw and 0 points for losing.
(C) Champions; (P) Promoted
