= Stan Trafford =

English cricketer and footballer (1945–2020)

Personal information
- Full name: Stanley John Trafford
- Date of birth: 21 December 1945
- Place of birth: Leek, Staffordshire, England
- Date of death: 19 November 2020 (aged 74)
- Position: Forward

Youth career
- Port Vale

Senior career*
Years	Team	Apps	(Gls)
1964–1965	Port Vale	12	(1)
1966	Macclesfield Town	9	(0)
Total		21	(1)
- * Club domestic league appearances and goals

Stanley John Trafford (21 December 1945 – 19 November 2020) was an English footballer and cricketer. He played his football for Port Vale and Macclesfield Town, and his cricket for Staffordshire.

== Early life ==
Trafford was born in Leek, Staffordshire on 21 December 1945. He was a keen football and cricket player in his youth and once took four wickets in four balls when playing for his school side. Trafford also played for the Port Vale youth team.

== Football career ==
Trafford signed for Port Vale as a professional under manager Freddie Steele in October 1964. He made 12 Third Division appearances. He scored one goal in a 2–1 win over Oldham Athletic during the 1964–65 season. Making his first-team debut at Vale Park on 17 October, in a 2–1 defeat to Bristol City, it was reported that "the loud mouths on the terraces certainly did a good job [of] hindering Stan Trafford". He scored his only goal in the English Football League in a 2–1 win over Oldham Athletic on 15 March. He was handed a free transfer by new boss Jackie Mudie in April 1965. He signed with Macclesfield Town of the Cheshire County League in January 1966. He made ten appearances before leaving Moss Rose in the summer.

"They were the best days of my life. If I was in the first team, I got £20 a week, which in comparison to guys working in an office or factory, was good money. There was £4 win bonus and £2 for a draw. I couldn't believe I was getting paid for something I enjoyed doing so much. My biggest attribute was I was quick.

— Trafford speaking in 2008.

Trafford was a Port Vale's ex-players association member and attended a game at the club in the 2019–20 season. He remained close friends with former team-mate Terry Lowe.

== Cricket career ==
In cricket, Trafford made his debut for Staffordshire in 1963, playing two matches that season against Northumberland and Durham in the Minor Counties Cricket Championship. Trafford next appeared for Staffordshire in 1976, playing two further Minor Counties Championship matches against Cheshire and Shropshire. It was in 1976 that Trafford played his only List A match, which came against Essex in the Gillette Cup. In this match, he was dismissed for a single run by John Lever. He retired as a player in 1984.

Trafford was associated with Leek Cricket Club for 60 years as a junior cricketer and later as a committee member and club secretary. Leek won the NSSCL Premier Division, Talbot Cup and Staffordshire Cup whilst Trafford was club secretary in 2001. He also spent 25 years coaching Staffordshire Under-19s.

Port Vale announced Trafford's death on 19 November 2020 at the age of 74.

== Career statistics ==
Appearances and goals by club, season and competition
Club	Season	League			FA Cup		Other		Total	
Club	Season	Division	Apps	Goals	Apps	Goals	Apps	Goals	Apps	Goals
Port Vale	1964–65	Third Division	12	1	0	0	0	0	12	1
Macclesfield Town	1965–66	Cheshire County League	9	0	0	0	1	0	10	0
Total			21	1	0	0	1	0	22	1
