= Stan Edwards (footballer, born 1942) =

English footballer

Personal information
- Full name: Stanley Edwards
- Date of birth: 11 December 1942
- Place of birth: West Bromwich, England
- Date of death: February 2014 (aged 71)
- Place of death: Denbigh, Wales
- Position: Left winger

Senior career*
Years	Team	Apps	(Gls)
1959–1961	Everton	0	(0)
1961–1963	Port Vale	49	(9)
- Bangor City
Total		49+	(9+)
- * Club domestic league appearances and goals

Stanley Edwards (11 December 1942 – February 2014) was an English footballer who played for Everton, Port Vale, and Bangor City.

== Career ==
Edwards began his career at Everton and played in the 1961 FA Youth Cup final defeat to a Chelsea side that included Ron Harris and Terry Venables. However, he never made his first-team debut at Goodison Park and instead signed with Norman Low's Port Vale in May 1961. He played 22 Third Division games in the 1961–62 season, and scored his first goal in the Football League on 17 March, in a 4–0 win over Lincoln City at Vale Park; he also claimed goals against Coventry City and Brentford. In the 1962–63 campaign he scored six goals in 27 league games and two goals in four FA Cup appearances. Despite this reasonable goal return he was transferred to Bangor City in July 1963.

== Career statistics ==
Appearances and goals by club, season and competition
Club	Season	League			FA Cup		Total	
Club	Season	Division	Apps	Goals	Apps	Goals	Apps	Goals
Everton	1959–60	First Division	0	0	0	0	0	0
Everton	1960–61	First Division	0	0	0	0	0	0
Everton	Total		0	0	0	0	0	0
Port Vale	1961–62	Third Division	22	3	0	0	22	3
Port Vale	1962–63	Third Division	27	6	4	2	31	8
Port Vale	Total		49	9	4	2	53	11
