= Tim Rawlings =

English footballer

Personal information
- Full name: Charles John Rawlings
- Date of birth: 4 November 1932
- Place of birth: Coleshill, Warwickshire, England
- Date of death: 28 September 2014 (aged 81)
- Position: Half-back

Youth career
- Erdington Albion

Senior career*
Years	Team	Apps	(Gls)
1950–1956	West Bromwich Albion	0	(0)
1956–1963	Walsall	200	(5)
1963–1965	Port Vale	31	(2)
- Nuneaton Borough
- Coleshill Town
Total		231	(7)
- * Club domestic league appearances and goals

Charles John "Tim" Rawlings (4 November 1932 – 28 September 2014) was an English footballer. A half-back, he made 231 league appearances in a 15-year career in the Football League. He made the bulk of these appearances for Walsall between 1956 and 1963, but also had six years without a game at West Bromwich Albion, and also spent two years at Port Vale. He helped Walsall to win two consecutive promotions from the Fourth Division to the Second Division in 1959–60 and 1960–61.

== Career ==
Rawlings played for Erdington Albion before joining West Bromwich Albion in 1950. He spent six seasons at The Hawthorns but was not handed his First Division debut either by Jack Smith or Vic Buckingham, and was instead allowed to leave the "Throstles" for Walsall in 1956. The "Saddlers" finished 15th in the Third Division South in 1956–57 under the stewardship of John Love. New boss Bill Moore could only take the club to a 20th-place finish in 1957–58, which led them to become founder members of the Fourth Division. They then posted a sixth-place finish in 1958–59, six points and two places outside of the promotion places. Walsall then topped the division in 1959–60 by a five-point margin to win a place in the Third Division. Walsall then finished second in 1960–61, six points behind champions Bury, to win a second successive promotion. The Fellows Park club finished 14th in the Second Division in 1961–62, before suffering relegation in 1962–63 due to their inferior goal average to 20th placed Charlton Athletic. In his seven years at the club, Rawlings played a total of 201 league games, scoring five goals.

Rawlings was signed by Port Vale manager Freddie Steele for a £4,000 fee in June 1963. He made 22 appearances in the 1963–64 season, and played 14 games in the 1964–65 campaign, as the "Valiants" suffered relegation out of the Third Division under Jackie Mudie. Rawlings was given a free transfer to Southern League side Nuneaton Borough in April 1965. He later turned out for hometown club Coleshill Town. He later worked for Lucas Industries.

== Career statistics ==
Appearances and goals by club, season and competition
Club	Season	League			FA Cup		Other		Total	
Club	Season	Division	Apps	Goals	Apps	Goals	Apps	Goals	Apps	Goals
West Bromwich Albion	1950–51	First Division	0	0	0	0	0	0	0	0
Walsall	1956–57	Third Division South	40	1	1	0	0	0	41	1
Walsall	1957–58	Third Division South	44	1	1	0	0	0	45	1
Walsall	1958–59	Fourth Division	45	1	1	0	0	0	46	1
Walsall	1959–60	Fourth Division	35	0	2	0	0	0	37	0
Walsall	1960–61	Third Division	18	1	1	0	1	0	20	1
Walsall	1961–62	Second Division	2	1	0	0	0	0	2	1
Walsall	1962–63	Second Division	16	0	0	0	0	0	16	0
Walsall	Total		200	5	6	0	1	0	207	5
Port Vale	1963–64	Third Division	19	1	3	0	0	0	22	1
Port Vale	1964–65	Third Division	12	1	1	0	1	0	14	1
Port Vale	Total		31	2	4	0	1	0	36	2
Career total			231	7	10	0	2	0	243	7

== Honours ==
Walsall

- Football League Fourth Division: 1959–60
- Football League Third Division second-place promotion: 1960–61
