= 1967–68 North Regional League =

North Regional League
- Season: 1967–68
- Champions: Hull City Reserves

The 1967–68 North Regional League was the 10th in the history of the North Regional League, a football competition in England.

== League table ==
Pos	Team	Pld	W	D	L	GF	GA	GR	Pts	Qualification
1	Hull City Reserves (C)	15	11	3	1	42	17	2.471	25	
2	Middlesbrough Reserves	16	10	3	3	47	27	1.741	23	
3	Sunderland Reserves	16	9	4	3	45	27	1.667	22	
4	South Shields (2) (P)	16	9	3	4	39	18	2.167	21	Founder members of Northern Premier League
5	Ashington (P)	16	6	4	6	28	26	1.077	16	Founder members of Northern Premier League
6	Gateshead (P)	16	5	6	5	26	37	0.703	16	Founder members of Northern Premier League
7	Carlisle United Reserves	15	2	4	9	18	30	0.600	8	
8	Stockton	16	1	4	11	21	44	0.477	6	
9	Workington Reserves	16	1	3	12	17	46	0.370	5	

Source: North Regional League
Rules for classification: 1) points; 2) goal difference; 3) number of goals scored.
The points system until the 1990–91 season: 2 points for a win, 1 point for a draw and 0 points for losing.
(C) Champions; (P) Promoted
