= David Mitchell (footballer, born 1945) =

English footballer (1945–2020)

Personal information
- Full name: David John Mitchell
- Date of birth: 24 August 1945
- Place of birth: Stoke-on-Trent, England
- Date of death: 10 December 2020 (aged 75)
- Position: Centre-forward

Youth career
- Port Vale

Senior career*
Years	Team	Apps	(Gls)
1964–1966	Port Vale	21	(4)
1966–1967	Ipswich Town	2	(0)
Total		23	(4)
- * Club domestic league appearances and goals

David John Mitchell (24 August 1945 – 10 December 2020) was an English footballer who played for Port Vale and Ipswich Town in the Football League in the 1960s.

== Career ==
Mitchell graduated through the Port Vale youth team to sign professional forms under manager Freddie Steele in March 1964. He made his first-team debut at Vale Park on 7 September 1964, in a 1–0 defeat to Luton Town. He scored his first goal for the club in a 2–2 draw at Mansfield Town on 28 September. He scored four goals in 19 league and cup games in the 1964–65 season, as the "Valiants" were relegated out of the Third Division. However, he played just five games in the 1965–66 season, scoring one goal in a 3–0 home win over Lincoln City, as Vale struggled near the foot of the Fourth Division table under new boss Jackie Mudie. He was given a free transfer in May 1966 and moved on to Ipswich Town. He played just two Second Division games for Bill McGarry's "Blues" in the 1966–67 season, and left the Football League after departing Portman Road. He later became a police officer in Stoke-on-Trent and married Mary.

== Career statistics ==
Appearances and goals by club, season and competition
Club	Season	League			FA Cup		League Cup		Total	
Club	Season	Division	Apps	Goals	Apps	Goals	Apps	Goals	Apps	Goals
Port Vale	1964–65	Third Division	17	3	1	1	1	0	19	4
Port Vale	1965–66	Fourth Division	4	1	1	0	0	0	5	1
Port Vale	Total		21	4	2	1	1	0	24	5
Ipswich Town	1966–67	Second Division	2	0	0	0	0	0	2	0
Career total			23	4	2	1	1	0	26	5
