= Alan Hill (footballer, born 1943) =

English footballer

Personal information
- Date of birth: 3 November 1943 (age 82)
- Place of birth: Barnsley, England
- Position: Goalkeeper

Youth career
- –: Barnsley

Senior career*
Years	Team	Apps	(Gls)
1960–1966	Barnsley	133	(0)
1966–1969	Rotherham United	81	(0)
1969–1970	Nottingham Forest	41	(0)
Total		255	(0)
- * Club domestic league appearances and goals

Alan Hill (born 3 November 1943) is an English former professional footballer who played as a goalkeeper, making over 250 appearances in the Football League for three clubs between 1960 and 1970.

== Career ==
Born in Barnsley, Hill began his career with the youth team of hometown club Barnsley, turning professional in 1960. After making over 130 appearances, he signed for Rotherham United in 1966.

Hill ended his career in 1970 with Nottingham Forest, after breaking his arm. He worked at Forest for 17 years as youth coach and head of recruitment, before becoming assistant manager under Frank Clark in 1993 following the departure of Brian Clough.

Between 1976 and 1987, Hill was the licensee of the Rancliffe Arms in Bunny, Nottinghamshire.
