= Terry Simpson (footballer) =

English footballer

Personal information
- Full name: Terence John Norman Simpson
- Date of birth: 8 October 1938 (age 88)
- Place of birth: Southampton, England
- Height: 5 ft 11 in (1.80 m)
- Position: Wing half

Youth career
- 1954–1957: Southampton

Senior career*
| Years | Team | Apps | (Gls) |
| 1957–1962 | Southampton | 22 | (1) |
| 1962–1963 | Peterborough United | 45 | (4) |
| 1963–1967 | West Bromwich Albion | 72 | (3) |
| 1967–1968 | Walsall | 51 | (4) |
| 1968–1969 | Gillingham | 36 | (4) |
| 1972–1973 | Swaythling Athletic | | |
| 1973–19?? | N.D.L.B. | | |
- * Club domestic league appearances and goals

Terence John Norman Simpson (born 8 October 1938) is an English retired professional footballer of the 1950s and 1960s. He played for Southampton, Peterborough United, West Bromwich Albion, Walsall, and Gillingham in a 14-year professional career. His career was ended by a broken leg sustained in March 1969, after which he became Gillingham's first team trainer.

In 1971, he returned to his native Hampshire, where he worked at the Ford Transit plant at Swaythling and played amateur football in the Southampton Saturday Football League.
