= 1962–63 Port Vale F.C. season =

Port Vale F.C.
1962–63 season
- Chairman: Joe Machin
- Manager: Norman Low (until 30 October); Freddie Steele (from October)
- Stadium: Vale Park
- Football League Third Division: 3rd (54 points)
- FA Cup: Fourth Round (eliminated by Sheffield United)
- League Cup: First Round (eliminated by Bristol Rovers)
- Top goalscorer: League: Tony Richards (13); All: Tony Richards (13)
- Highest home attendance: 22,207 vs. Sheffield United, 13 March 1963
- Lowest home attendance: 4,673 vs. Hull City, 20 April 1962
- Average home league attendance: 8,130
- Biggest win: 5–1 vs. Southend United, 24 September 1962
- Biggest defeat: 0–3 vs. Bournemouth & Boscombe Athletic, 13 May 1962
Home colours

The 1962–63 season was Port Vale's 51st season of football in the English Football League, and their fourth season in the Third Division. A season of near-glory and managerial upheaval, it began under Norman Low, who unexpectedly resigned on 30 October, with Freddie Steele returning to the helm and re-establishing his famous "Steele Curtain" defence. Vale powered their way to a third‑place finish with 54 points, just four behind promotion, although rivals Stoke City and Crewe Alexandra's promotions made Vale's strong campaign feel particularly bittersweet.

In the FA Cup, Vale advanced to the Fourth Round, eventually falling 2–1 to First Division side Sheffield United in front of a home crowd of 22,207 on 13 March 1963 — their highest attendance of the season. In the League Cup, Vale were knocked out in the First Round by Bristol Rovers. Tony Richards became the club's league and overall top scorer, netting 13 goals in just 14 appearances, despite only being signed for £9,000 from Walsall in March. Earlier-season goalscoring had proven meagre until his mid-season arrival. Attendance figures reflected cautious optimism at Vale Park: an average of approximately 8,130, with the low point at 4,673 against Hull City (20 April) and the standout high during the cup clash with Sheffield United.

Ultimately, the 1962–63 campaign was defined by resurgence under Steele, a haul of crucial clean sheets, and a thrilling FA Cup run — but promotion narrowly slipped through Vale's grasp.

== Overview ==
=== Third Division ===
The pre-season saw the arrival of John Rowland, a 'tall and skilful' outside-right from Nottingham Forest for £6,000.

The season opened with six points from four games, with three clean sheets. The increasing violence in the game was in evidence, though, as trainer Eric Jones was hit with a bottle in the 1–0 victory at Wrexham. The players remained unfazed and managed to claim a goalless draw at Millwall's Den on 27 August. Rowland was dropped from the first XI following a 2–0 defeat at Ashton Gate on 1 September. Vale responded two days later with a "rip-roaring display of punchy soccer" in a 4–2 victory over Colchester United. They then became inconsistent, and so Low added young forward Terry Harkin to the squad from Coleraine, and transfer-listed Stan Steele after he began to be targeted by hecklers at Vale Park. Despite coming from a goal down to beat Southend United 5–1, the club continued to fall down the table. They then began a nine-game unbeaten streak on 20 October with a 1–1 draw with Carlisle United at Brunton Park.

On 30 October, manager Norman Low tendered his resignation, to the shock of fans and pundits. Low cited disagreements with the board as the reason for his departure. The club felt they needed a marquee signing and so approached first Tom Finney and then European cup winning coach Béla Guttmann, who had just departed Benfica, both declined the role. Low's successor instead proved to be his predecessor, Freddie Steele, in another development that took many by surprise. Roy Sproson later noted "He [Steele] had changed. He had not got the enthusiasm or drive as before, but the lads still responded to him".

On 9 November, Vale beat Barnsley by a goal to nil, though a section of the Vale Park crowd threatened violence against referee Jack Pickles after he sent off Stan Steele. It took until the sixth game of Freddie Steele's reign for a goal to be conceded (525 minutes) as 'the Steele Curtain' again descended upon Vale Park. The goal was scored by former Valiant turned bogey player Ronnie Allen for Crystal Palace in a 4–1 home win for Vale. This win was followed by a 2–2 draw with Wrexham that left the Vale within two points of second place. They finished the year chasing promotion, despite losing 4–3 to Reading at Elm Park. No league games were played in January or February due to the Big Freeze. To help with finances during this spell of two months without competitive action, Bert Llewellyn was sold to Northampton Town for £7,000 and Arthur Longbottom was sold to Millwall for £2,000.

Back in action in March, Steele found his offence wanting, and so purchased Tony Richards from Walsall for £9,000. Richards immediately impacted himself on the club's scoring charts, bagging a brace at Halifax Town, eventually finishing as top-scorer for his two months of work. A 2–0 victory over Carlisle United was the first game at Vale Park in 12 weeks, as the club had found themselves with up to four games in hand on their rivals. For the four weeks following 20 April, Vale recorded eight wins from their final ten matches, though this would prove to be too little too late regarding promotion. Hopes of promotion were extinguished with a 3–0 home defeat to Bournemouth & Boscombe Athletic on 13 May.

They finished in third spot with 54 points, four short of promotion, though enough to earn them £500 in talent money. Their 58 goals conceded total was fewer only than Swindon Town.

=== Finances ===
On the financial side, a profit of £2,275 was made despite an operating loss of £20,557. A donation from the Sportsmen's Association and social club stood at a highly impressive £22,832. Whilst wages remained fairly constant at £33,120, gate receipts had fallen by £8,000. The club's overdraft stood at £41,000, leading to a discussion over whether or not to take out a mortgage on Vale Park. The club management decided to replace the black and amber kit with the traditional white shirts, black shorts and black and white socks – the kit Steele's men triumphed in almost ten years previously. On the playing front, Peter Ford's departure to Macclesfield Town was the only transfer of note.

=== Cup competitions ===
In the FA Cup, Vale took their revenge upon Bristol Rovers, dumping them out of the competition at the first stage with a 2–0 win at Burslem on 21 November. Three weeks later, Aldershot suffered the same fate in Sproson's 500th appearance for the club. In the third round they beat Fourth Division side Gillingham 4–2 at Priestfield. The tie had been postponed 12 times due to consistently freezing conditions. They then lost 2–1 to First Division club Sheffield United in front of 22,207 rain-soaked supporters.

In the League Cup, Bristol Rovers won the first round clash at the Memorial Stadium 2–0.

== Results ==
=== Football League Third Division ===
==== League table ====
Pos	Team	Pld	W	D	L	GF	GA	GAv	Pts	Promotion or relegation
1	Northampton Town (C, P)	46	26	10	10	109	60	1.817	62	Promotion to the Second Division
2	Swindon Town (P)	46	22	14	10	87	56	1.554	58	Promotion to the Second Division
3	Port Vale	46	23	8	15	72	58	1.241	54	
4	Coventry City	46	18	17	11	83	69	1.203	53	
5	Bournemouth & Boscombe Athletic	46	18	16	12	63	46	1.370	52	

(C) Champions; (P) Promoted

==== Results by matchday ====
Round	1	2	3	4	5	6	7	8	9	10	11	12	13	14	15	16	17	18	19	20	21	22	23	24	25	26	27	28	29	30	31	32	33	34	35	36	37	38	39	40	41	42	43	44	45	46
Ground	A	H	H	A	A	H	H	A	A	A	H	H	A	H	A	A	H	A	H	H	A	A	H	H	A	A	H	A	A	H	A	A	H	H	A	A	H	H	A	H	A	H	H	H	A	H
Result	W	D	W	D	L	W	L	W	L	L	W	W	L	D	D	L	L	D	W	W	D	W	W	D	L	L	W	W	L	W	L	W	W	D	L	L	W	W	L	W	W	W	W	L	W	W
Position	1	2	1	2	8	4	8	4	8	11	8	4	7	6	8	10	13	12	11	5	9	9	8	8	8	13	12	10	11	9	10	10	8	7	9	10	9	8	10	6	6	5	3	6	4	3
Points	2	3	5	6	6	8	8	10	10	10	12	14	14	15	16	16	16	17	19	21	22	24	26	27	27	27	29	31	31	33	33	35	37	38	38	38	40	42	42	44	46	48	50	50	52	54

Source: Statto
A = Away; H = Home; W = Win; D = Draw; L = Loss

==== Matches ====
18 August 1962 1	Wrexham	0–1	Port Vale	Wrexham
15:15 BST		Report	Llewellyn 21'	Stadium: Racecourse Ground; Attendance: 14,042; Referee: H.P. Hackney; Assistant referees: W.S. Castle, B.W. Porter

20 August 1962 2	Port Vale	1–1	Millwall	Burslem
	Longbottom	Report		Stadium: Vale Park; Attendance: 12,469

25 August 1962 3	Port Vale	2–0	Reading	Burslem
	Llewellyn; Grainger	Report		Stadium: Vale Park; Attendance: 9,506

27 August 1962 4	Millwall	0–0	Port Vale	New Cross, Lewisham
		Report		Stadium: The Den; Attendance: 20,553

1 September 1962 5	Bristol City	2–0	Port Vale	Ashton Gate, Bristol
		Report		Stadium: Ashton Gate; Attendance: 9,626

3 September 1962 6	Port Vale	4–2	Colchester United	Burslem
	Longbottom 4'; Grainger 15'; Poole 26'; Ford 28'	Report	King 27', 52'	Stadium: Vale Park; Attendance: 11,719

8 September 1962 7	Port Vale	1–3	Watford	Burslem
	Grainger (pen.)	Report	Brown; Gregory	Stadium: Vale Park; Attendance: 11,108

10 September 1962 8	Colchester United	0–1	Port Vale	Colchester
		Report	Wright	Stadium: Layer Road; Attendance: 5,919

15 September 1962 9	Bradford (Park Avenue)	2–1	Port Vale	Bradford
		Report	Llewellyn	Stadium: Park Avenue; Attendance: 8,935

17 September 1962 10	Southend United	2–0	Port Vale	Southend-on-Sea
		Report		Stadium: Roots Hall; Attendance: 10,963

22 September 1962 11	Port Vale	2–1	Coventry City	Burslem
	(og.); Grainger	Report	Hugh Barr	Stadium: Vale Park; Attendance: 9,816

24 September 1962 12	Port Vale	5–1	Southend United	Burslem
	Edwards; Harkin; Ford	Report		Stadium: Vale Park; Attendance: 9,618

29 September 1962 13	Bournemouth & Boscombe Athletic	2–0	Port Vale	Bournemouth
		Report		Stadium: Dean Court; Attendance: 9,715

1 October 1962 14	Port Vale	1–1	Notts County	Burslem
	Edwards	Report		Stadium: Vale Park; Attendance: 9,245

6 October 1962 15	Bristol Rovers	1–1	Port Vale	Bristol
		Report	Poole	Stadium: Eastville Stadium; Attendance: 12,374

11 October 1962 16	Notts County	1–0	Port Vale	Nottingham
		Report		Stadium: Meadow Lane; Attendance: 14,320

13 October 1962 17	Port Vale	1–2	Brighton & Hove Albion	Burslem
	Poole	Report		Stadium: Vale Park; Attendance: 7,503

20 October 1962 18	Carlisle United	1–1	Port Vale	Carlisle
		Report	Steele	Stadium: Brunton Park; Attendance: 5,627

27 October 1962 19	Port Vale	2–1	Swindon Town	Burslem
	Harkin 24', 73'	Report	Jackson 90'	Stadium: Vale Park; Attendance: 5,825; Referee: E. Crawford

9 November 1962 20	Port Vale	1–0	Barnsley	Burslem
	Steele	Report		Stadium: Vale Park; Attendance: 8,798

17 November 1962 21	Northampton Town	0–0	Port Vale	Northampton
		Report		Stadium: County Cricket Ground; Attendance: 8,718

1 December 1962 22	Hull City	0–1	Port Vale	Kingston upon Hull
15:00 GMT		Report	Rowland	Stadium: Boothferry Park; Attendance: 7,259

8 December 1962 23	Port Vale	4–1	Crystal Palace	Burslem
	Llewellyn; Rowland	Report		Stadium: Vale Park; Attendance: 6,537

15 December 1962 24	Port Vale	2–2	Wrexham	Burslem
15:15 GMT	Grainger 9'; Llewellyn 14'	Report	Anderson 23'; Colbridge 75'	Stadium: Vale Park; Attendance: 7,172; Referee: K. Howley; Assistant referees: A.E. Morrissey, J.D. Jones

22 December 1962 25	Reading	4–3	Port Vale	Reading, Berkshire
		Report	Ford; Miles	Stadium: Elm Park; Attendance: 5,578

2 March 1963 26	Brighton & Hove Albion	3–1	Port Vale	Hove
		Report	Edwards	Stadium: Goldstone Ground; Attendance: 10,050

9 March 1963 27	Port Vale	2–0	Carlisle United	Burslem
	Rowland; Harkin	Report		Stadium: Vale Park; Attendance: 6,308

16 March 1963 28	Swindon Town	2–3	Port Vale	Swindon
	Smith 12', 60'	Report	Dawson 5' (og.); Steele 75'; Rowland 86'	Stadium: County Ground; Attendance: 12,090; Referee: K. Ashton

18 March 1963 29	Peterborough United	3–1	Port Vale	Peterborough
	Hudson 5', 37'; Rayner 40'	Report	Harkin 12'	Stadium: London Road Stadium; Attendance: 10,162; Referee: J. Carr; Assistant referees: C. Rogers

23 March 1963 30	Port Vale	3–2	Peterborough United	Burslem
	Steele 27'; Harkin 77'; Edwards 90'	Report	Simpson 7'; Rayner 34'	Stadium: Vale Park; Attendance: 10,260; Referee: E. Walker

29 March 1963 31	Barnsley	2–1	Port Vale	Barnsley
		Report	Edwards	Stadium: Oakwell; Attendance: 4,368

3 April 1963 32	Halifax Town	0–4	Port Vale	Halifax, West Yorkshire
		Report	Harkin; Richards	Stadium: The Shay; Attendance: 2,808

6 April 1963 33	Port Vale	3–1	Northampton Town	Burslem
	Richards; Harkin	Report	Lines	Stadium: Vale Park; Attendance: 8,781

12 April 1963 34	Port Vale	0–0	Shrewsbury Town	Burslem
		Report		Stadium: Vale Park; Attendance: 11,315

13 April 1963 35	Queens Park Rangers	3–1	Port Vale	Shepherd's Bush, West London
	Leary; Collins	Report	Steele	Stadium: Loftus Road; Attendance: 5,690

15 April 1963 36	Shrewsbury Town	2–1	Port Vale	Shrewsbury
		Report	Ford	Stadium: Gay Meadow; Attendance: 6,819

20 April 1963 37	Port Vale	1–0	Hull City	Burslem
15:15 GMT	Rowland	Report		Stadium: Vale Park; Attendance: 4,673

22 April 1963 38	Port Vale	2–0	Halifax Town	Burslem
	Richards	Report		Stadium: Vale Park; Attendance: 5,968

27 April 1963 39	Crystal Palace	2–1	Port Vale	Selhurst, Croydon
		Report	Richards	Stadium: Selhurst Park; Attendance: 13,183

29 April 1963 40	Port Vale	3–2	Queens Park Rangers	Burslem
	Richards; Rowland; Sproson	Report	Leary; Sproson (og.)	Stadium: Vale Park; Attendance: 5,974

4 May 1963 41	Coventry City	0–1	Port Vale	Coventry
		Report	Richards	Stadium: Highfield Road; Attendance: 18,307

6 May 1963 42	Port Vale	2–1	Bradford (Park Avenue)	Burslem
	Miles; Steele	Report		Stadium: Vale Park; Attendance: 6,680

11 May 1963 43	Port Vale	3–1	Bristol City	Burslem
	Richards; Rowland	Report		Stadium: Vale Park; Attendance: 5,337

13 May 1963 44	Port Vale	0–3	Bournemouth & Boscombe Athletic	Burslem
		Report		Stadium: Vale Park; Attendance: 7,362

18 May 1963 45	Watford	1–2	Port Vale	Watford
	Livesey	Report	Richards; Wright	Stadium: Vicarage Road; Attendance: 5,955

20 May 1963 46	Port Vale	2–0	Bristol Rovers	Burslem
	Richards (pen.); Miles	Report		Stadium: Vale Park; Attendance: 5,015

=== FA Cup ===
3 November 1962 R1	Bristol Rovers	0–2	Port Vale	Bristol
		Report	Llewellyn	Stadium: Eastville Stadium; Attendance: 8,180

24 November 1962 R2	Port Vale	2–0	Aldershot	Burslem
	Llewellyn; Edwards (pen.)	Report		Stadium: Vale Park; Attendance: 12,638

27 February 1963 R3	Gillingham	2–4	Port Vale	Gillingham, Kent
		Report	Steele; Edwards; Ford; Grainger (pen.)	Stadium: Priestfield Stadium; Attendance: 6,713

13 March 1963 R4	Port Vale	1–2	Sheffield United	Burslem
	Grainger	Report		Stadium: Vale Park; Attendance: 22,207

=== League Cup ===
27 September 1962 R1	Bristol Rovers	2–0	Port Vale	Bristol
		Report		Stadium: Eastville Stadium; Attendance: 6,126

== Squad statistics ==
=== Appearances and goals ===
Key to positions: GK – Goalkeeper; DF – Defender; MF – Midfielder; FW – Forward

No.	Pos	Nat	Player	Total		Third Division		FA Cup		League Cup	
No.	Pos	Nat	Player	Apps	Goals	Apps	Goals	Apps	Goals	Apps	Goals
	GK	(England) ENG	Ken Hancock	51	0	46	0	4	0	1	0
	DF	(England) ENG	Terry Lowe	40	0	35	0	4	0	1	0
	DF	(England) ENG	John Nicholson	51	0	46	0	4	0	1	0
	DF	(England) ENG	Roy Sproson	47	1	42	1	4	0	1	0
	DF	(England) ENG	Selwyn Whalley	21	0	20	0	1	0	0	0
	MF	(England) ENG	Stan Edwards	31	8	27	6	4	2	0	0
	MF	(England) ENG	Peter Ford	29	6	25	5	3	1	1	0
	MF	(England) ENG	Colin Grainger	29	7	25	5	3	2	1	0
	MF	(England) ENG	Mel Machin	1	0	1	0	0	0	0	0
	MF	(England) ENG	Terry Miles	41	3	37	3	3	0	1	0
	MF	(England) ENG	Jim Watton	5	0	5	0	0	0	0	0
	MF	(Northern Ireland) NIR	Bernard Wright	15	2	14	2	0	0	1	0
	FW	(England) ENG	Barry Hancock	9	0	9	0	0	0	0	0
	FW	(Northern Ireland) NIR	Terry Harkin	17	10	17	10	0	0	0	0
	FW	(England) ENG	Harry Poole	47	3	43	3	4	0	0	0
	FW	(England) ENG	John Rowland	41	7	37	7	4	0	0	0
	FW	(England) ENG	Tony Richards	14	13	14	13	0	0	0	0
	FW	(England) ENG	Stan Steele	40	7	35	6	4	1	1	0
Players who featured but departed the club during the season:
	FW	(England) ENG	Bert Llewellyn	21	10	18	7	2	3	1	0
	FW	(England) ENG	Arthur Longbottom	11	2	10	2	0	0	1	0

=== Top scorers ===
Place	Position	Nation	Name	Third Division	FA Cup	League Cup	Total
1	FW	England	Tony Richards	13	0	0	13
2	FW	Northern Ireland	Terry Harkin	10	0	0	10
–	FW	England	Bert Llewellyn	7	3	0	10
4	MF	England	Stan Edwards	6	2	0	8
5	FW	England	John Rowland	7	0	0	7
–	FW	England	Stan Steele	6	1	0	7
–	MF	England	Colin Grainger	5	2	0	7
8	FW	England	Peter Ford	5	1	0	6
9	MF	England	Terry Miles	3	0	0	3
–	FW	England	Harry Poole	3	0	0	3
11	MF	Northern Ireland	Bernard Wright	2	0	0	2
–	FW	England	Arthur Longbottom	2	0	0	2
13	DF	England	Roy Sproson	1	0	0	1
–	–	–	Own goals	2	0	0	2
			TOTALS	72	9	0	81

== Transfers ==
=== Transfers in ===
Date from	Position	Nationality	Name	From	Fee	Ref.
August 1962	FW	ENG	John Rowland	Nottingham Forest	£6,000	
August 1962	MF	NIR	Bernard Wright	(Republic of Ireland) Sligo Rovers	Free transfer	
September 1962	MF	NIR	Terry Harkin	(Northern Ireland) Coleraine	£2,000	
September 1962	MF	ENG	Jim Watton	(Netherlands) De Graafschap	Free transfer	
March 1963	FW	ENG	Tony Richards	Walsall	£9,000	

=== Transfers out ===
Date from	Position	Nationality	Name	To	Fee	Ref.
January 1963	FW	ENG	Arthur Longbottom	Millwall	£2,000	
February 1963	FW	ENG	Bert Llewellyn	Northampton Town	£7,000	
May 1963	MF	NIR	Bernard Wright		Released	
July 1963	MF	ENG	Stan Edwards	(Wales) Bangor City	Free transfer	
Summer 1963	MF	ENG	Peter Ford	Macclesfield Town	Released	

=== Loans out ===
Date from	Position	Nationality	Name	To	Date until	Ref.
April 1963	MF	NIR	Bernard Wright	Stafford Rangers	May 1963	
