= North Regional League =

Football league in northern England

- Founded: 1959
- Country: England
- Number of clubs: 22
- Feeder to: None

The North Regional League was a football competition in Northern England. The League was formed in 1958 as a reserve league for Football League teams in the North of England. After being formed with 19 members, and reaching a maximum of 22 teams in its second season, numbers quickly began to decline, and by the final season, 1968–69, only four teams competed.

While the membership consisted mainly of reserve teams, a few first teams were admitted in at attempt to boost numbers, two of these (Gateshead and South Shields) were among those teams that lifted the championship.

== Champions ==
Season	Champions
1958–59	Middlesbrough Reserves
1959–60	Middlesbrough Reserves
1960–61	Middlesbrough Reserves
1961–62	Middlesbrough Reserves
1962–63	Rotherham United Reserves
1963–64	Gateshead
1964–65	Hull City Reserves
1965–66	Hull City Reserves
1966–67	South Shields F.C.
1967–68	Hull City Reserves
1968–69	Sunderland Reserves
