= 1968–69 Northern Premier League =

Northern Premier League
- Season: 1968–69
- Champions: Macclesfield Town
- Promoted: None
- Relegated: Ashington; Chorley; Worksop Town
- Matches: 380
- Goals: 1,230 (3.24 per match)
- Biggest home win: Altrincham 8–1 Northwich Victoria (25 January 1969)
- Biggest away win: South Liverpool 1–7 Bangor City (28 August 1968) Goole Town 1–7 Bangor City (1 February 1969) Ashington 0–6 Chorley (19 April 1969)
- Highest scoring: Bangor City 7–3 Ashington (8 February 1969); South Shields 8–2 Runcorn (15 February 1969)
- Longest winning run: 10 matches South Shields (8 February 1969 – 12 April 1969)
- Longest unbeaten run: 14 matches Wigan Athletic (10 August 1968 – 12 October 1968); Macclesfield Town (28 September 1968 – 4 January 1969)
- Longest winless run: 12 matches Netherfield (17 August 1968 – 26 October 1968)
- Longest losing run: 8 matches Ashington (25 January 1969 – 5 April 1969)

The 1968–69 Northern Premier League was the inaugural season of the Northern Premier League, a regional football league in Northern England, the northern areas of the Midlands and North Wales. The season began on 10 August 1968 and concluded on 10 May 1969.

== Overview ==
The League featured twenty teams transferred from the Cheshire County League, the Lancashire Combination, the Midland League, the North Regional League and the West Midlands (Regional) League.

=== Founding teams ===
Cheshire County League

- Altrincham
- Bangor City
- Hyde United
- Macclesfield Town
- Northwich Victoria
- Runcorn
- Wigan Athletic

Lancashire Combination

- Chorley
- Fleetwood
- Morecambe
- Netherfield
- South Liverpool

Midland League

- Gainsborough Trinity
- Goole Town
- Scarborough
- Worksop Town

North Regional League

- Ashington
- Gateshead
- South Shields

West Midlands (Regional) League

- Boston United

=== League table ===
Pos	Team	Pld	W	D	L	GF	GA	GR	Pts	Qualification or relegation
1	Macclesfield Town (C)	38	27	6	5	82	38	2.158	60	
2	Wigan Athletic	38	18	12	8	59	41	1.439	48	
3	Morecambe	38	16	14	8	64	37	1.730	46	
4	Gainsborough Trinity	38	19	8	11	64	43	1.488	46	
5	South Shields	38	19	8	11	78	56	1.393	46	
6	Bangor City	38	18	9	11	102	64	1.594	45	
7	Hyde United	38	16	10	12	71	65	1.092	42	
8	Goole Town	38	15	10	13	80	78	1.026	40	
9	Altrincham	38	14	10	14	69	52	1.327	38	
10	Fleetwood	38	16	6	16	58	58	1.000	38	
11	Gateshead	38	14	9	15	42	48	0.875	37	
12	South Liverpool	38	12	13	13	56	66	0.848	37	
13	Northwich Victoria	38	16	5	17	59	82	0.720	37	
14	Boston United	38	14	8	16	59	65	0.908	36	
15	Runcorn	38	12	11	15	59	63	0.937	35	
16	Netherfield	38	12	4	22	51	69	0.739	28	
17	Scarborough	38	9	10	19	49	68	0.721	28	
18	Ashington (R)	38	10	8	20	48	74	0.649	28	Relegation to Northern Alliance
19	Chorley (R)	38	8	9	21	46	75	0.613	25	Relegation to Lancashire Combination
20	Worksop Town (R)	38	6	8	24	34	88	0.386	20	Relegation to Midland League

Updated to match(es) played on 10 May 1969. Source: The Football Archives.Com
Rules for classification: 1) points; 2) goal average; 3) number of goals scored.

The system of using goal average to separate two teams tied on points was used up until the 1976–77 season.

The points system up until the 1982–83 season: 2 points for a win, 1 point for a draw and 0 points for a losing.
(C) Champions; (R) Relegated

=== Results ===
Home \ Away	ALT	ASH	BAN	BOS	CHO	FLE	GAI	GAT	GOO	HYD	MAC	MOR	NET	NOR	RUN	SCA	SLI	SSH	WIG	WOK
Altrincham		6–0	2–1	1–1	3–0	1–1	3–0	1–0	6–1	1–1	1–1	2–0	2–0	8–1	3–1	2–0	1–2	1–1	0–3	3–2
Ashington	1–2		1–2	4–0	0–6	0–1	1–3	1–0	2–2	0–2	2–3	0–2	5–2	1–0	2–1	0–0	4–0	3–2	1–2	1–0
Bangor City	4–3	7–3		5–2	5–0	1–2	0–2	2–1	4–3	3–3	0–0	2–2	6–0	4–0	2–1	2–3	2–2	1–1	3–3	6–1
Boston United	2–1	0–2	2–6		0–2	0–0	1–1	0–1	4–2	3–1	2–1	1–0	2–1	6–0	2–2	1–0	1–1	5–3	1–2	0–1
Chorley	0–0	0–0	0–1	1–3		1–3	0–4	2–2	1–2	1–1	1–1	0–5	3–1	2–1	1–1	3–1	1–2	1–0	1–2	2–0
Fleetwood	2–0	2–1	4–1	3–0	2–2		0–3	3–1	0–2	0–2	1–2	1–2	2–1	2–3	5–0	1–0	1–3	1–3	1–2	6–2
Gainsborough Trinity	2–1	2–1	0–0	1–0	2–1	1–2		5–0	1–0	4–0	4–1	1–2	4–1	1–0	2–1	4–1	1–1	1–2	0–0	2–0
Gateshead	1–0	1–0	0–0	1–1	3–0	3–1	1–1		6–2	3–0	2–4	1–1	2–1	1–1	0–1	0–2	0–0	0–0	1–0	1–0
Goole Town	3–3	5–2	1–7	3–1	0–2	0–1	0–0	2–1		4–0	5–2	0–5	3–1	5–0	3–0	2–3	2–2	1–3	1–1	4–2
Hyde United	2–0	5–1	2–7	4–0	4–1	4–0	0–0	2–0	3–3		0–1	1–1	1–1	3–2	4–3	2–1	5–1	0–0	2–2	3–0
Macclesfield Town	2–1	1–0	3–1	2–0	2–1	3–2	2–0	3–0	3–0	4–0		2–2	2–0	2–0	1–0	3–3	5–0	3–0	2–0	3–1
Morecambe	3–1	0–0	1–1	1–1	2–1	1–0	5–0	2–0	2–3	3–0	1–2		3–0	2–3	2–0	1–1	2–1	3–0	2–2	0–0
Netherfield	2–2	3–2	0–1	2–1	3–1	4–0	2–1	0–1	3–3	2–1	1–2	0–2		4–1	0–1	5–1	2–0	3–0	0–1	3–0
Northwich Victoria	3–1	2–2	3–1	2–1	3–1	1–2	2–1	0–1	0–3	1–2	2–1	0–0	1–1		1–4	3–2	2–1	1–2	2–1	2–1
Runcorn	0–0	2–0	3–1	2–4	1–1	1–3	4–5	0–1	1–1	2–2	2–0	1–1	5–0	2–2		2–0	2–0	2–0	1–0	4–0
Scarborough	0–1	1–1	2–0	0–4	5–2	2–0	4–0	1–1	1–4	1–2	2–5	0–0	0–1	0–2	0–0		1–1	2–1	0–2	1–1
South Liverpool	0–0	6–0	1–7	3–0	5–3	2–0	0–3	3–1	0–0	3–1	0–1	1–1	1–0	3–4	2–2	4–1		2–2	1–1	0–0
South Shields	4–3	0–0	3–1	2–3	3–0	1–1	2–1	3–1	3–1	2–0	0–4	3–1	1–0	6–2	8–2	2–2	5–0		1–0	5–0
Wigan Athletic	3–2	1–1	4–0	0–3	1–0	1–1	1–1	3–0	1–1	2–0	0–0	1–0	3–1	2–3	3–1	2–1	2–1	1–3		3–1
Worksop Town	2–1	0–3	0–5	1–1	1–1	1–1	1–0	0–3	1–3	2–6	1–3	4–1	2–0	0–3	1–1	1–4	0–1	3–1	1–1	

Updated to match(es) played on 10 May 1969. Source: The Football Archives
Legend: Blue = home team win; Yellow = draw; Red = away team win.

=== Stadia and locations ===
Locations of the 1968–69 Northern Premier League teams

Team	Stadium
Altrincham	Moss Lane
Ashington	Portland Park
Boston United	York Street
Bangor City	Farrar Road
Chorley	Victory Park
Fleetwood	Highbury
Gainsborough Trinity	The Northolme
Gateshead	Redheugh Park
Goole Town	Victoria Pleasure Ground
Hyde United	Ewen Fields
Macclesfield Town	Moss Rose
Morecambe	Christie Park
Netherfield	Parkside
Northwich Victoria	Drill Field
Runcorn	Canal Street
Scarborough	Athletic Ground
South Liverpool	Holly Park
South Shields	Simonside Hall
Wigan Athletic	Springfield Park
Worksop Town	Central Avenue

== Cup results ==
=== Challenge Cup ===
Stage	Home team	Score	Away team	Attendance
1st Leg	Bangor City	3–1	Runcorn	
2nd Leg	Runcorn	1–2	Bangor City	2260
Aggregate	Bangor City	5–2	Runcorn	

=== FA Cup ===
Out of the twenty clubs from the Northern Premier League only Morecambe reached for the second round:

Second Round

Home team	Score	Away team
York City	2–0	Morecambe

== End of the season ==
At the end of the first season of the Northern Premier League none of the clubs decided to put their teams forward to be promoted to the Football League. Chorley and Worksop Town were both relegated. Ashington resigned the League, due to financial difficulties.

=== Football League elections ===
Alongside the four Football League teams facing re-election, a total of ten non-League teams applied for election, none of which were from the Northern Premier League. All four Football League teams were re-elected.

Team	League	Votes
Grimsby Town	Football League	47
York City	Football League	45
Bradford Park Avenue	Football League	38
Newport County	Football League	27
Cambridge United	Southern League	16
Kettering Town	Southern League	3
Cambridge City	Southern League	2
Hereford United	Southern League	2
Romford	Southern League	2
Bedford Town	Southern League	1
Chelmsford City	Southern League	1
Worcester City	Southern League	1
Nuneaton Borough	Southern League	0
Wimbledon	Southern League	0

=== Promotion and relegation ===
The following three clubs left the League at the end of the season:

- Ashington resigned, demoted to Northern Alliance
- Chorley relegated to Lancashire Combination
- Worksop Town relegated to Midland League (1889)

The following three clubs joined the League the following season:

- Stafford Rangers promoted from Cheshire County League
- Great Harwood promoted from Lancashire Combination
- Matlock Town promoted from Midland League (1889)
