= 1969–70 Northern Premier League =

Northern Premier League
- Season: 1969–70
- Champions: Macclesfield Town
- Promoted: None
- Relegated: Gateshead; Hyde United
- Matches: 380
- Goals: 1,158 (3.05 per match)
- Biggest home win: Scarborough 8–0 Great Harwood (14 March 1970)
- Biggest away win: Gateshead 0–7 South Shields (27 December 1969)
- Highest scoring: Runcorn 4–4 Great Harwood (1 November 1969) Runcorn 2–6 Matlock Town (29 November 1969); Great Harwood 3–5 Gainsborough Trinity (7 March 1970) Scarborough 8–0 Great Harwood (14 March 1970)
- Longest winning run: 8 matches Macclesfield Town (13 September 1969 – 22 November 1969)
- Longest unbeaten run: 16 matches Macclesfield Town (8 September 1969 – 28 February 1970)
- Longest winless run: 26 matches Gateshead (30 August 1969 – 27 March 1970)
- Longest losing run: 7 matches Goole Town (27 March 1970 – 2 May 1970)

The 1969–70 Northern Premier League was the second season of the Northern Premier League, a regional football league in Northern England, the northern areas of the Midlands and North Wales. The season began on 9 August 1969 and concluded on 9 May 1970.

== Overview ==
The League featured twenty teams for the second consecutive season.

=== Team changes ===
The following three clubs left the League at the end of the previous season:

- Ashington resigned, demoted to Northern Alliance
- Chorley relegated to Lancashire Combination
- Worksop Town relegated to Midland League (1889)

The following three clubs joined the League at the start of the season:

- Stafford Rangers promoted from Cheshire County League
- Great Harwood promoted from Lancashire Combination
- Matlock Town promoted from Midland League (1889)

=== League table ===
Pos	Team	Pld	W	D	L	GF	GA	GR	Pts	Qualification or relegation
1	Macclesfield Town (C)	38	22	8	8	72	41	1.756	52	
2	Wigan Athletic	38	20	12	6	56	32	1.750	52	
3	Boston United	38	21	8	9	65	33	1.970	50	
4	Scarborough	38	20	10	8	74	39	1.897	50	
5	South Shields	38	19	7	12	66	43	1.535	45	
6	Gainsborough Trinity	38	16	11	11	64	49	1.306	43	
7	Stafford Rangers	38	16	7	15	59	52	1.135	39	
8	Bangor City	38	15	9	14	68	63	1.079	39	
9	Northwich Victoria	38	15	8	15	60	66	0.909	38	
10	Netherfield	38	14	9	15	56	54	1.037	37	
11	Hyde United (R)	38	15	7	16	59	59	1.000	37	Relegated to Cheshire County League
12	Altrincham	38	14	8	16	62	65	0.954	36	
13	Fleetwood	38	13	10	15	53	60	0.883	36	
14	Runcorn	38	11	13	14	57	72	0.792	35	
15	Morecambe	38	10	13	15	41	51	0.804	33	
16	South Liverpool	38	11	11	16	44	55	0.800	33	
17	Great Harwood	38	10	9	19	63	92	0.685	29	
18	Matlock Town	38	8	12	18	52	67	0.776	28	
19	Goole Town	38	10	6	22	50	71	0.704	26	
20	Gateshead (R)	38	5	12	21	37	94	0.394	22	Relegated to Wearside League

Updated to match(es) played on 10 May 1969. Source: The Football Archives
Rules for classification: 1) points; 2) goal average; 3) number of goals scored.

The system of using goal average to separate two teams tied on points was used up until the 1976–77 season.

The points system up until the 1982–83 season: 2 points for a win, 1 point for a draw and 0 points for losing.
(C) Champions; (R) Relegated

=== Results ===
Home \ Away	ALT	BAN	BOS	FLE	GAI	GAT	GOO	GHA	HYD	MAC	MAT	MOR	NET	NOR	RUN	SCA	SLI	SSH	STA	WIG
Altrincham		1–1	1–0	3–2	1–2	3–1	4–2	2–1	4–1	2–4	3–3	0–3	4–1	1–2	2–1	0–2	2–2	3–1	1–2	1–3
Bangor City	3–4		1–1	1–1	1–1	3–1	5–2	3–0	5–0	2–0	4–0	2–0	1–2	3–2	4–1	0–2	1–0	3–0	1–0	2–1
Boston United	1–0	0–0		3–0	1–2	7–0	1–0	3–0	2–0	1–0	2–0	2–0	4–0	5–0	1–0	2–0	1–1	2–0	2–0	0–0
Fleetwood	1–1	4–2	3–1		1–3	1–1	1–2	2–2	1–0	3–2	1–0	0–0	2–0	3–0	5–0	0–0	0–6	3–0	2–1	1–0
Gainsborough Trinity	3–0	2–1	1–3	1–1		2–1	5–0	6–1	0–1	0–0	1–1	0–0	3–2	2–2	1–1	2–1	4–2	1–3	2–3	1–1
Gateshead	1–2	2–1	0–0	3–2	2–2		2–2	2–1	3–1	1–0	3–3	1–1	1–2	1–2	1–3	0–4	1–1	0–7	0–1	0–0
Goole Town	3–3	2–3	0–0	2–0	3–1	6–1		1–2	3–1	1–3	1–0	2–1	2–1	0–3	0–0	0–3	1–0	0–1	0–2	0–1
Great Harwood	1–2	4–1	5–1	2–0	3–5	1–1	2–4		1–7	2–3	2–0	2–1	3–1	2–2	2–2	1–5	1–1	2–1	4–1	2–1
Hyde United	2–1	3–1	2–1	5–2	1–2	3–0	1–0	1–1		4–0	1–1	2–0	2–1	0–0	1–0	3–3	0–0	0–1	1–0	2–3
Macclesfield Town	1–1	4–0	2–0	2–1	1–0	4–0	2–0	5–2	2–1		3–1	5–0	1–0	1–0	2–2	2–3	1–1	0–0	4–1	0–0
Matlock Town	2–1	0–0	1–4	1–1	2–4	4–1	2–2	1–1	1–2	0–2		3–0	0–3	4–0	1–0	0–3	1–1	1–1	4–1	5–0
Morecambe	1–4	5–1	0–1	1–1	0–1	2–0	2–1	2–0	2–1	1–3	3–0		0–0	2–0	1–1	1–3	2–0	1–1	2–2	2–1
Netherfield	2–0	2–3	1–1	1–3	1–1	1–1	2–1	3–3	3–0	2–3	2–1	2–0		2–1	4–0	2–2	3–1	0–0	3–2	1–0
Northwich Victoria	2–0	2–0	3–2	1–0	2–1	5–1	4–2	1–0	3–0	2–2	2–2	1–1	2–1		3–4	1–2	1–0	0–2	1–1	1–2
Runcorn	2–0	3–3	2–4	4–1	2–1	1–1	2–1	4–4	1–1	2–2	2–6	1–1	1–0	2–2		1–1	1–0	1–2	2–1	0–4
Scarborough	2–1	1–1	1–1	3–1	1–0	1–1	2–1	8–0	3–1	0–1	5–0	1–0	1–0	2–1	2–0		0–0	0–1	1–1	1–1
South Liverpool	0–0	1–0	0–2	1–2	0–0	2–0	1–1	3–2	1–5	0–1	1–0	3–0	0–3	3–4	2–0	3–2		3–1	2–1	0–2
South Shields	2–1	4–1	0–1	3–0	0–1	5–1	2–0	4–1	4–1	3–1	3–1	1–1	3–1	5–1	1–4	3–2	0–1		0–0	1–1
Stafford Rangers	0–1	3–2	3–2	2–1	2–0	5–0	3–1	1–0	2–2	0–2	1–0	1–1	1–1	4–1	1–2	4–1	4–0	1–0		1–2
Wigan Athletic	2–2	2–2	4–0	0–0	1–0	3–1	2–1	1–0	1–0	2–1	0–0	1–1	0–0	1–0	3–2	2–0	5–1	2–0	1–0	

Updated to match(es) played on 9 May 1970. Source: The Football Archives
Legend: Blue = home team win; Yellow = draw; Red = away team win.

=== Stadia and locations ===
Locations of the 1969–70 Northern Premier League teams

Team	Stadium
Altrincham	Moss Lane
Bangor City	Farrar Road
Boston United	York Street
Fleetwood	Highbury
Gainsborough Trinity	The Northolme
Gateshead	Redheugh Park
Goole Town	Victoria Pleasure Ground
Great Harwood	The Showground
Hyde United	Ewen Fields
Macclesfield Town	Moss Rose
Matlock Town	Causeway Lane
Morecambe	Christie Park
Netherfield	Parkside
Northwich Victoria	Drill Field
Runcorn	Canal Street
Scarborough	Athletic Ground
South Liverpool	Holly Park
South Shields	Simonside Hall
Stafford Rangers	Marston Road
Wigan Athletic	Springfield Park

== Cup results ==
=== Challenge Cup ===
Stage	Home team	Score	Away team
1st Leg	Altrincham	?–?	Macclesfield Town
2nd Leg	Macclesfield Town	?–?	Altrincham
Aggregate	Altrincham	4–3	Macclesfield Town

=== FA Cup ===
Out of the twenty clubs from the Northern Premier League only South Shields reached for the second round:

Second Round

Home team	Score	Away team	
South Shields	0–0	Oldham Athletic	
Oldham Athletic	1–2	South Shields	Replay

Third Round

Home team	Score	Away team
Queens Park Rangers	4–1	South Shields

=== FA Trophy ===
Out of the twenty clubs from the Northern Premier League only Macclesfield Town reached for the fourth round:

Fourth Round

Home team	Score	Away team	
Burton Albion	1–1	Macclesfield Town	
Macclesfield Town	4–2	Burton Albion	Replay

Semi-finals

Home team	Score	Away team
Macclesfield Town	1–0	Barnet

Final

Home team	Score	Away team
Macclesfield Town	2–0	Telford United

== End of the season ==
At the end of the second season of the Northern Premier League none of the teams put forward, for election, received enough votes to be promoted to the Football League. Hyde United resigned the league, due to financial difficulties and Gateshead was relegated.

=== Football League elections ===
Alongside the four Football League teams facing re-election, a total of thirteen non-League teams applied for election, three of which were from the Northern Premier League. Three out of the four Football League teams were re-elected. Cambridge United from the Southern League replaced Bradford Park Avenue from the Football League as they didn't receive enough votes. Bradford Park Avenue was subsequently relegated to the Northern Premier League.

Team	League	Votes
Darlington	Football League	47
Hartlepool	Football League	42
Cambridge United	Southern League	31
Newport County	Football League	31
Bradford Park Avenue	Football League	17
Wigan Athletic	Northern Premier League	3
Cambridge City	Southern League	2
Yeovil Town	Southern League	1
Bedford Town	Southern League	1
Hereford United	Southern League	1
Morecambe	Northern Premier League	1
Romford	Southern League	1
Boston United	Northern Premier League	0
Chelmsford City	Southern League	0
Hillingdon Borough	Southern League	0
Telford United	Southern League	0
Wimbledon	Southern League	0

=== Promotion and relegation ===
The League expanded from twenty clubs to twenty-two clubs for the following season.

The following two clubs left the League at the end of the season:

- Hyde United resigned, demoted to Cheshire County League
- Gateshead relegated to Wearside Football League

The following four clubs joined the League the following season:

- Bradford Park Avenue relegated from Football League Fourth Division.
- Chorley promoted from Lancashire Combination (returning after a year's absence)
- Kirkby Town promoted from Lancashire Combination
- Lancaster City promoted from Lancashire Combination
