= Warley F.C. =

Warley
- Full name: Warley Football Club

Warley F.C. was an English football club.

== History ==
The club won the West Midlands (Regional) League Division 1 title in 1968 – their first season in the competition – but rather than take promotion to the Premier Division they moved into the Midland League. They spent three years in the more senior competition before returning to the WMRL in 1971, being admitted to the Premier Division. They were relegated to Division 1 in 1973 and resigned altogether in 1976.

They also competed in the FA Cup on two occasions, reaching the 2nd Qualifying Round in 1972.
