= History of Port Vale F.C. =

History of an English football club

The history of Port Vale Football Club, an English association football club based in Stoke-on-Trent, began with the formation of the club, which is officially dated in 1876. However, later research has shown this event probably took place in 1879. In 1884, the club moved to the town of Burslem (which is located within the city of Stoke-on-Trent, just as Stoke-upon-Trent and four other towns), changing their name to Burslem Port Vale in the process. The club joined the Football League Second Division upon its formation in 1892 and spent 13 non-consecutive seasons in the division, punctuated by two seasons in the Midland League (1896–97 and 1897–98). A financial crisis resulted in the club's liquidation in 1907. However, the name of Port Vale F.C. survived as North Staffordshire Federation League side Cobridge Church took on the name and moved into the Old Recreation Ground in Hanley, before progressing through the divisions to win re-election to the Football League in October 1919.

They spent 16 non-consecutive seasons in the Second Division, punctuated by them winning the Third Division North title in 1929–30; they won the division despite having sold club record goalscorer Wilf Kirkham. The club then moved to Vale Park in 1950 after being forced to sell the Old Recreation Ground to pay off a debt. During the 1953–54 season, Vale secured the Third Division North title and a semi-final place in the FA Cup with manager Freddie Steele's "Iron Curtain" defence. After a brief decline, new manager Norman Low led the Vale to the Fourth Division title in 1958–59. However, the 1960s proved to be a tough decade, particularly in 1968 after Stanley Matthews resigned as manager and the club was forced to apply for re-election to the Football League after illegal payments were made to players. New manager Gordon Lee then masterminded promotion in 1969–70, and the Vale would spend most of the 1970s in the third tier until relegation in 1977–78. They were promoted again in 1982–83 before returning to the basement division immediately.

John Rudge was appointed as manager in December 1983 and would remain in the post for the next 16 years. Overseeing a golden period for the club, Vale won promotion out of the Fourth Division in 1985–86 and into the second tier following promotions from the third tier in 1988–89 and 1993–94. They also won the Football League Trophy in 1993. His reign ended in January 1999, and the club entered a decline, slipping into the fourth tier whilst twice entering administration in 2003 and 2012 after the chairmanships of first Bill Bell and then Bill Bratt ended in crises. Norman Smurthwaite took the club out of administration in 2012 and manager Micky Adams achieved automatic promotion from League Two in the 2012–13 season, though they were relegated back into League Two at the end of the 2016–17 season after a failed experiment with a continental staff and playing style. Carol Shanahan bought the club in 2019 and manager Darrell Clarke secured promotion out of the League Two play-offs at the end of the 2021–22 season. Vale were relegated again at the end of the 2023–24 season, though they secured an immediate promotion in 2024–25.

Port Vale's league positions from 1892 to present.

== 1876 or 1879: Founding ==
The precise details of the club's founding are not known. A Port Vale cricket club were in existence in 1874, which may or may not have had any relation to the football club. It had been thought that Port Vale were formed during an 1876 meeting at Port Vale House, from where the club was supposed to have taken its name. However, no evidence of such a named public house ever came to light.

However, comprehensive research by historian Jeff Kent indicated that the club was probably formed in 1879 as an offshoot of the Porthill Victoria football club and took its name from its location in the valley of canal ports. Evidence supporting this came from Vale chairman Robert Audley writing that the club was "an organisation of twenty-eight years standing" in 1907. Also, John Hood and an 'E.Hood' were recorded as scoring goals for Porthill Victoria on 4 January 1879, which seems to have disbanded at the end of that season. The 1879 theory suggests that Porthill Victoria players broke away to found Port Vale in 1879, having tired of travelling up the hill to Wolstanton from their workplaces to play their football. Before 1926, the occasional mentions in print of the club's founding had given the year of formation as 1879, and most of the founders would not have reached adulthood by 1876. However, the January 1926 50-year jubilee celebrations saw the 1876 date firmly established as the year of the club's founding; it is unknown what convinced the organizers at the time that the date was correct. To add to the confusion, local newspaper The Sentinel also printed 1879 as the club's founding date on 10 March 1928 and 24 August 1931, despite reporting on the jubilee celebrations in January 1926.

Another theory on the club's origins is that Port Vale was formed from a merger of Wolstanton, Middleport and Burslem St. Paul's, but little evidence supports it. A further theory is that Port Vale were originally a brickworks team, mainly based on the existence of bricks with "Burslem Port Vale" and "Port Vale" marked upon them. However, these names appear to indicate their place of manufacture (in Port Vale, the valley of ports) and often have a company name upon them, so there is no hard evidence to link them to the football club.

The unique name of Port Vale has attracted interest and debate. The players lived near Port Vale Wharf, Port Vale Street, Port Vale Corn Mills and Port Vale House. Also, with nearby Porthill Victoria having played upon a hill, the team of the valley below meant that the name Port Vale was "a rather natural choice." Another theory was that the name came from a shortening of 'Longport Vale'.

== 1879–1907: Early years ==
The kit used in Vale's first League season (1892)

The club played football at Limekiln Lane, Longport. From 1880 at Westport, paying £1 for the use of Westport Meadows. The 1851 Ordnance Survey Map of Longport clearly shows the Port Vale Wharf and the adjacent Longport Lime Kilns, including the eponymous lane. Under its founder Enoch Hood, the club rose rapidly above the dozen or so other local Burslem clubs to become the strongest club in the town within a few years. Already in 1880, the club had a reserve team and managed to attract the best players from their local rivals. They began to charge admission to their games and joined the Staffordshire Football Association on 6 September 1882.

The first recorded line-up was on 9 December 1882 in a Staffordshire Senior Cup second round replay at Stoke. The match finished 5–1 to Stoke, with Enoch Hood scoring Vale's goal.

1 J.Baskeville
2 R.Dain
3 W.Poulson
4 C.Simpson

5 G.Bateman
6 G.Boulton
7 E.Hood (c)
8 B.Davies

9 H.Alcock
10 W.Reynolds
11 H.Hood

On 2 February 1884, the club annihilated Middlewich 16–0 in a friendly. Later in the month, Billy Poulson and Charlie Simpson were selected to represent Staffordshire. The Sentinel wrote of "our two local champions – Stoke and Port Vale". From that point on, it was these two clubs that defined football in the Potteries.

The club moved to Burslem in 1884, playing on a new ground constructed at Moorland Road. The first game at the ground was a 6–0 thrashing of Everton. Not long after the club changed its name to Burslem Port Vale. In the summer of 1885, the club moved into the Athletic Ground and started to pay their players regular wages. In 1888, the club failed to gain inclusion for the founding of the English Football League; rivals Stoke were one of the twelve founders. Instead, Vale joined The Second Combination, a league that lasted just one season. Their poor showing in that league meant they were not invited to join the new and short-lived Football Alliance. Progress was made, however, as the club hired their first professional trainer – Joey Law, from West Bromwich Albion.

In 1890, the club became founder members of the Midland League, where they played two seasons of football. A third-place finish in 1891–92 was enough to win them election to the new Football League Second Division in 1892. The club suffered greatly from the death of star striker Frank McGinnes. On 10 December 1892, they played in a snowstorm, and lost 10–0 at home to Sheffield United. This remains a Football League record. Vale finished eleventh out of twelve but won re-election to the league. The team fared poorly in the league for the following three seasons and failed to win re-election at the end of 1895–96. This resulted in another two seasons in the Midland League. They fared poorly, but as the Football League expanded for the 1898–99 season, Port Vale were re-elected – this came mostly thanks to their FA Cup victory over eventual First Division champions Sheffield United. The club's financial troubles were not solved by their league status, they suffered indifference in the league the cup competitions for several seasons. Adrian Capes was top scorer for four consecutive seasons and was a rare bright light. The club survived by selling their top players (including Copes), going on cup runs and cutting costs wherever possible. The club resigned from the league on 14 June 1907. An appeal for supporters to prop the club up with donations failed; the directors did not believe the club to be viable "in any shape or form". Stoke and Oldham Athletic took on most of the now-unemployed players.

== 1907–1919: Years in the wilderness ==
Joe Brough hit a club record 43 goals in the 1909–10 season.

Burslem Port Vale was awaiting liquidation and was no longer in operation; it eventually wound up in 1909. The club's history would have ended at this point had it not been for an unexpected twist. North Staffordshire Church League champions Cobridge Church were accepted into the North Staffordshire Federation League, which was still a minor league. Joint-secretaries Millward and E.C.Brundrett had very big ambitions however. In 1907, they sought permission from the Football Association to change the club's name to Port Vale and bought the old club's ground (the Athletic Ground). To signify their roots they renamed their reserve side to Cobridge Church. Port Vale were now playing teams such as Leek United, Newchapel United and Ashwood Villa. However, their fifth-placed finish encouraged the club to apply successfully for North Staffordshire & District League membership. Financial pressures soon affected the lowly club, and in December 1908, former Vale player Sam Bennion led a buy-out consortium. Former players Adrian Copes, Bert Eardley and Harry Croxton were re-signed and the future looked bright.

In 1909–10, the club won the North Staffordshire & District League but lost key players such as Joe Brough (to Liverpool), Billy Cavenor (to Blackpool) and Bert Eardley (to Glossop). On 21 July 1911, the club re-organised, with J.H. Edwards elected chairman. The club also stepped up to the Central League. Facing another financial crisis, coupled with numerous issues with their Cobridge Ground, Vale transferred to the Old Recreation Ground in 1912, moving from Burslem to Hanley. This allowed the club to host over 10,000 spectators regularly. At the end of the 1913–14 season, Vale agreed to stand down for re-election to the Football League, so that their stronger rivals Stoke would have a stronger chance of gaining re-election. It was understood that this favour would one day be repaid. In the meantime, former Stoke veteran and former England international Tom Holford was appointed as player-manager. The club ceased activities in 1914–15 in order not to hinder the war effort. During the war Frank Cannon was killed and Alf Smith was seriously wounded. In March 1919, the club failed to win re-election. However, they returned to the Football League in October 1919, taking over the fixture list of Leeds City in the Second Division, who were disbanded because of financial irregularities.

== 1919–1929: Back with the big boys ==
Chairman Frank Huntbach, who coined the nickname the "Valiants".

The club began to take their familiar shape during this period. Around November 1920, club chairman Frank Huntbach came up with the nickname "the Valiants". In 1921 the club adopted their familiar white and black strip after having experimented with numerous colours, including; plain red, gold and black stripes, claret and blue and even during 1898–1902 playing in the red and white stripes now used by rivals Stoke City for the past 100 years. However, the kit soon changed to plain red shirts with white shorts in 1923, a look which lasted until 1934, when the white shirt, black shorts and socks kit once again was adopted.

In February 1921, top striker Bobby Blood was sold to West Bromwich Albion for an unprecedented £4,000. A January 1922 signing of Wales international goalkeeper Teddy Peers from Wolverhampton Wanderers meant the club now saw one of its current players capped at international level for the first time. However, the club soon went into financial trouble again. In June 1923, former trainer Billy Barr reported the club to the FA for making illegal payments to its players. Found guilty, the club was punished with a £100 fine, with around £150 being fined to various officials and players. On 11 November 1923, Tom Butler died in hospital after sustaining injuries on the pitch. The cash-strapped club arranged a benefit fund; Stoke and numerous other clubs raised a total of £700 for the man's widow. Wilf Kirkham was the club's top scorer in 1924–25 with 33 goals. He would be the club's top scorer for the next three seasons.

On 16 April 1926, the club's directors agreed to amalgamate with rivals Stoke City. Citing reducing gates and a history of financial trouble, the club's hierarchy felt the merger was for the best. Vale's supporters were far from keen on the proposal and threatened to start their own club if the merger went ahead. As it happened, Stoke were relegated in 1925–26, leaving Vale in the Second Division and Stoke in the Third Division (North). On 19 May, Stoke decided against the proposal and the four Vale directors, including the chairman, who had come up with the plan, tendered their resignations. In the summer of 1927, the club debated moving back to Cobridge, building a 50,000 capacity stadium. However, with the city council having a first option on repurchasing The Old Recreation Ground and offering a mere £20,000, the plan was killed. At the end of the 1928–29 season the club were relegated to the Third Division North for the first time in their history. To make matters even more grim, goal machine Kirkham was sold to rivals Stoke, though the £2,800 fee was of some comfort.

== 1929–1939: Pre-war ups and downs ==
In 1929–30, only the two champions of the Third Divisions (North and South) would be promoted. The sale of Kirkham allowed for the strengthening of the team in other areas, though their talisman would still be missed. On 29 September 1929, manager Joe Schofield died, with Vale top of the league. Reserve team coach Tom Morgan was put in charge of first-team affairs. The club's terrific form continued, and they finished the season as champions on 67 points. Their 37 goals conceded was the strongest defensive record in all four divisions. The 1930–31 was among the strongest in the club's history. A fifth-place finish in the second tier was achieved mostly thanks to a solid defence. At the end of the season, the club profited from a mini-tour of the Netherlands, where they recorded two victories over the Dutch Southern XI and a team of international reserves. However, a loss of £800 was made on the season. Top-scorer for two seasons running, Sam Jennings was transferred to Stockport County; age was quickly catching up with the veteran striker. Jennings was one of many moved on or sold; Phil Griffiths was also moved on, sold to Everton for £6,000. The new team fared poorly and were skirting the bottom of the division by Christmas time. A major boost came, therefore, with the re-signing of Wilf Kirkham from Stoke City in January. They finished the season in 20th position, escaping relegation only on goal average.

The team was reshuffled to fare better in 1932–33. The club said goodbye to long-serving custodian Bob Connelly and former England international and Villa legend Dicky York. Manager Tom Morgan was also replaced, with former manager Tom Holford reinstated. However, the club again narrowly avoided relegation and had little cause for celebration, though a profit was made financially. The club had a clearout again. Under-performers, such as Kirkham, were let go and chose to pursue a career in education rather than football. The club had a strong 1933–34 on the pitch, finishing in eight place. Billy Tabram held strong at the back while Tom Nolan was scoring consistently. However, the season was a financial disaster. As a result, 15 players were let go, including Bill Cope, Jimmy McGrath and Len Armitage, Tabram was sold to Hull City for a good profit, as was Fred Mills and George Poyser to Leeds United and Brentford respectively. The 1934–35 season was largely forgettable on the pitch, apart from a close FA Cup game with eventual runners-up West Bromwich Albion. However, in the middle of the season there were calls for a change of name; supporters were barely in favour, with names such as 'Stoke Central' and 'Stoke United' suggested. A meeting of shareholders discussed the name of 'Stoke North End', though the eventually settled on 'Hanley Port Vale'. This new name was not favoured by the fans and talk of a name change lingered for a few years before eventually falling away.

Vale suffered relegation in 1935–36. The pre-season consisted of selling top striker Tom Nolan to Bradford Park Avenue and manager Holford talking of a 'young players policy'. The season finished in a second-from-bottom finish and another plea for donations to survive financially. Warney Cresswell was appointed as manager for the club's 1936–37 campaign, with the aim of promotion. Tom Nolan was also brought back from Bradford. After a mid-table finish, Creswell left the club. A young Eric Hayward was transferred to Blackpool, Ken Gunn moved onto Northampton Town, and Allan Todd went to Nottingham Forest. Roger Jones also ended his 14-year association with the club. In December 1937, Tom Morgan was reinstated as manager. He could not prevent the 1937–38 season being another story of mid-table mediocrity. Jack Roberts impressive tally of 28 goals was the only ray of hope for escaping the division. At the end of the season roughly half the team were transferred or let go. Notable new faces for the 1938–39 campaign were goalkeeper Arthur Jepson, defender George Collin and right-half George Hannah. The club was also transferred to the Third Division South, good news as the league saw higher gate receipts. The club failed to impact the division, though, and were fighting to avoid a re-election battle rather than achieve promotion, as injuries hit the squad.

== 1939–1950: World War II and the post-war revival ==
With the outbreak of war in Europe and Vale sitting bottom of the Third Division South after two games, the 1939–40 season was cancelled as Britain and the allies fought a brutal war against Nazi Germany and the axis. Stoke-on-Trent was deemed a 'neutral and reception area', and so football throughout the war was permitted. However, many players went off to war, and the club could not compete in the war leagues due to financial limitations and the loss of players to the war effort. They managed to sustain a youth team, which enjoyed local success. The death of Major W.M.Huntbach, chairman of the club, left the greatly in debt. This left the club with no option but to sell The Old Recreation Ground to the city council. The deal went through on 31 October 1940 for £13,500, the council refusing the club's permission to rent the ground. The club was therefore left homeless and without any professional players in the middle of a world war. However, the council had a change of heart and decided to permit the club to rent the ground until a few seasons after the end of the war, eventually extending the deal to 20 June 1950.

By the summer of 1944, the club had revived their first team, had found a location in Hamil Road, Burslem, for their new stadium and had started a fund to raise £30,000 for this purpose. Jack Diffin was appointed team manager to supervise the 1944–45 roster of games. With Germany and Japan's defeat, peace was restored, and the 1946–47 season began. Morris Jones bagged 26 goals as the club finished in a respectable tenth place. It was also the club's most successful year financially up to that point, with a net profit of over £4,000 recorded. Jones lost his scoring touch in 1947–48 and was sold to Swindon Town for £2,500 in November 1947. The club finished in eighth but made a loss in the transfer market and over the season as a whole. The 1948–49 was largely forgettable, though the club made record profits of just over £7,000. The five figure sum received for Bill Pointon played a big part in this profit.

The club started 1949–50 with 86 players, though only 27 were full-time professionals. A pre-season acquisition of a young Ray King from Ashington would later prove significant. However, the signing of defender Lol Hamlett would be of greater short-team importance. The season saw another mid-table finish, though most of the talk was on the up-and-coming stadium in Burslem. A massive £20,000 was raised for the sale of Ronnie Allen to West Brom. One major setback was the government's refusal of permission to transfer a stand from the old stadium to the new, despite the protestations of local MP Albert Davies.

== 1950–1959: New stadium, new triumphs ==
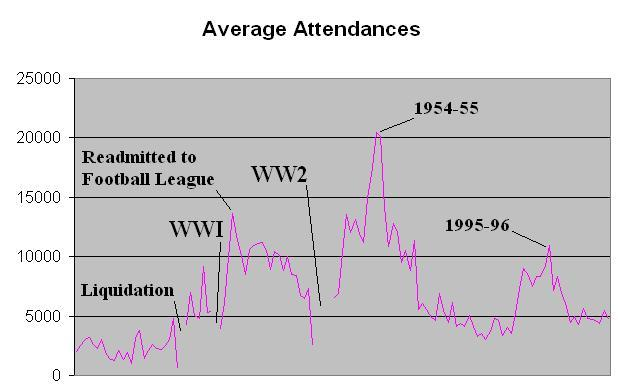
In 1954–55 an average of 20,708 fans turned up for home games.

In 1950, Vale Park was completed. The 1950–51 season was the first at their new home. The stadium was impressive, but the team was not so, yet again failing to improve on mid-table. The players had to familiarise themselves with a much larger stadium and pitch. Along with their new stadium came a new player – Roy Sproson. In March, Bill McGarry was sold to Huddersfield Town for £12,000. He had moved on to better things and, after impressing at the First Division club, was selected for the England team. Still working on the new stadium, especially trying to solve the drainage problem, the club were very quiet on the transfer front for the start of the 1951–52 campaign. In September, Alan Martin was exchanged with rivals Stoke for £10,000 and Albert Mullard. Initially against the trade, supporters eventually warmed to Mullard, the season's top scorer. The team suffered before Christmas, and manager Ivor Powell was sacked – to the relief of the players. On Christmas Eve Freddie Steele became manager. He managed to bring the club back into the safety of mid-table.

Steele quickly established himself at the club, masterminding the celebrated 'Iron Curtain' defence. He worked largely with the players already at the club, who were quite young and, therefore, easier to mould into the players he needed. The FA switched the club to the Third Division North in 1952–53. With a haul of 58 points, the club were unfortunate to lose out only one point off champions Oldham Athletic and therefore remain in the third tier. A remarkable 35 goals were conceded in 46 games, but the attack was disappointing, though Basil Hayward did manage 22 goals.

The 1953–54 saw Vale storming to the Third Division North title as well as reaching the semi-finals of the FA Cup, losing out to eventual winners West Brom in very controversial fashion, seeing an Albert Leake goal disallowed for offside. Villa Park saw an attendance of 68,221 for the game. The defence of Ray King, Stan Turner, Reg Potts, Albert Mullard, Tommy Cheadle and Roy Sproson was key to the "Valiants" success, missing just ten games between them. Their league record of 21 goals conceded in 46 games is a Football League record that stands today. Just five of these were conceded at Vale Park. Champions of the Southern Division Ipswich Town had the next-best defensive record in the Football League with a total of thirty more goals conceded than Vale.

The 'no buy, no sell' policy was unsurprisingly continued into 1954–55. They fared poorly, though they were some way off relegation. Their weakness in front of goal continued, and the top scorer Cyril Done managed just 13 goals, having joined in December 1954 from Tranmere Rovers. The average home attendance of 20,708 is a club record that still stands today. However, having spent almost £7,000 in transfer fees, the club barely broke even. The club's youth policy continued into 1955–56. However, in January 1956, the club broke their transfer record to secure the services of "Spurs" striker and former England international Eddie Baily for £7,000. The club finished twelfth, just three points off third place Liverpool. The 1956–57 campaign was a disaster; the club relegated with 22 points in 22nd place. Norman Low replaced Freddie Steele in February 1957, but the team showed little improvement. Cyril Done was the top scorer with a mere nine goals, while the team scored just four goals away from home.

The 1957–58 season was unique, as the bottom twelve in both Third Divisions would be relegated to a newly created Fourth Division. Low made many changes of personal, making the team barely recognisable to that of the glory days just a few years earlier. New man Stan Steele rifled in a total of 22 goals, but it was not enough to prevent a 15th-place finish and, therefore, a ticket to the new fourth tier. Their first season in this new division was extremely successful, as the club took the title with a club record 110 goals. Normal Low picked out three-star players: 'the supreme goalscorer' Graham Barnett, 'the find of the season' Ken Hancock and that 'model of consistency' Stan Steele. With five forwards hitting double figures, a profit being made and the gate receipts increasing optimism was high in Burslem, especially with the Bycars End terrace work being completed leading to an overall capacity of 50,000.

== 1959–1969: The Sixties ==
On 9 January 1960, Port Vale gave 'one of the finest performances in their history', beating high-flying Second Division club Cardiff City 2–0 at Ninian Park, and 'thoroughly deserved' their third round victory. In round four, 'the defence took the honours' in a 1–0 win at second-tier Scunthorpe United. The fifth round held eventual Second Division champions Aston Villa, who ran out 2–1 winners at Vale Park. However, their fine cup form did not transfer over to the league, and a mid-table position finished the 1959–60 season. Stan Steele was an ever-present for the third season running. The club meant business in 1960–61, as proven by a £10,000 attempt to sign Villa's Gerry Hitchens. In January, Albert Leake left for Macclesfield Town, leaving Roy Sproson the only surviving member of the legendary 1953–54 club. After Stan Steele was 'rested' following 195 consecutive appearances and consequently put in a transfer request. In March 1961 he moved to West Brom for a £10,000 fee. Cliff Portwood's 26 goals helped the club achieve a seventh-place finish.

In preparation for 1961–62, Steele was bought back from The Hawthorns for the same price he was sold for. However, a 'shock' came with the same Cliff Portwood to Grimsby Town for £6,000. Manager Low believed the team could be promoted. On 2 October, 22,895 witnessed Czechoslovakia defeat Port Vale 3–1. Later in the month £6,000 was spent on bringing Colin Grainger from Leeds United. On 27 January, Vale visited Second Division Sunderland in the FA Cup fourth round, almost 50,000 fans witnessed £50,000 Brian Clough effectively contained by the Vale defence as a goalless draw saw the "Mackems" pay a visit to Vale Park. In the replay, Vale recorded a 3–1 win in 'a magical piece of soccer history'. In the fifth round the club were defeated 1–0 by top-flight Fulham. Another mid-table finish and small profit ended the season.

The club's poor start to 1962–63 left a heckled Stan Steele transfer listed. On 30 October Low shocked the fans with his resignation, even more surprisingly old boss Freddie Steele was reinstated. The "Steele curtain" returned to Vale Park, as the team went 525 minutes without conceding a goal ironically this run was ended by Ronnie Allen, now with Crystal Palace scored an otherwise meaningless consolation goal. The previous season's top scorers Bert Llewellyn and Arthur Longbottom were sold to Northampton Town for £7,000 and Millwall for £2,000 respectively. On 13 March, the club went out of the FA Cup in the fourth round and defeated 2–1 by the top tier Sheffield United. Tony Richards was bought for £9,000 in March and amazingly became the season's top scorer with 13 goals in three months and 14 games. With rivals Stoke promoted from the second tier and Crewe from the fourth, Vale finished in third, four points off the Second Division.

Determined to win promotion in 1963–64, the club spent £15,000 a piece on Northern Ireland international Billy Bingham and Englishman Albert Cheesebrough. Tim Rawlings was also bought for £4,000 from nearby Walsall. Soon into the season, winger Ron Smith was also purchased from Crewe for £6,500. Scotsmen Jackie Mudie and Ron Wilson were transferred from Stoke City for around £12,000. The club did well in the FA Cup, taking Liverpool to a fourth round replay, However, the season was a disaster in the league. It was 'the season that misfired', having spent a massive amount of money (nearly £50,000 alone in transfer fees), they finished a whole ten places lower than the previous season. The club made a net loss of £42,650, even with the regular donation from the Supporters Association of close to £20,000.

The club flopped completely in 1964–65. Goalkeeper Ken Hancock was sold to Ipswich Town at Christmas time, raising £10,000. Freddie Steele departed in February, as Jackie Mudie was appointed caretaker manager. Mudie created 'a punchier attack and a far more stable defence' as the club managed four home wins in a row. However, the club were relegated in 22nd place, five points away from safety. No club in the Football League had scored less than Vale's tally of 41, with top scorer Cheesebrough managing just seven strikes. To slash the wage bill, Stan Steele, Ron Smith, Ron Andrew, Tim Rawlings and Stan Trafford all left on free transfers. The season saw a financial loss of around £15,000, with home attendance averaging around 5,500.

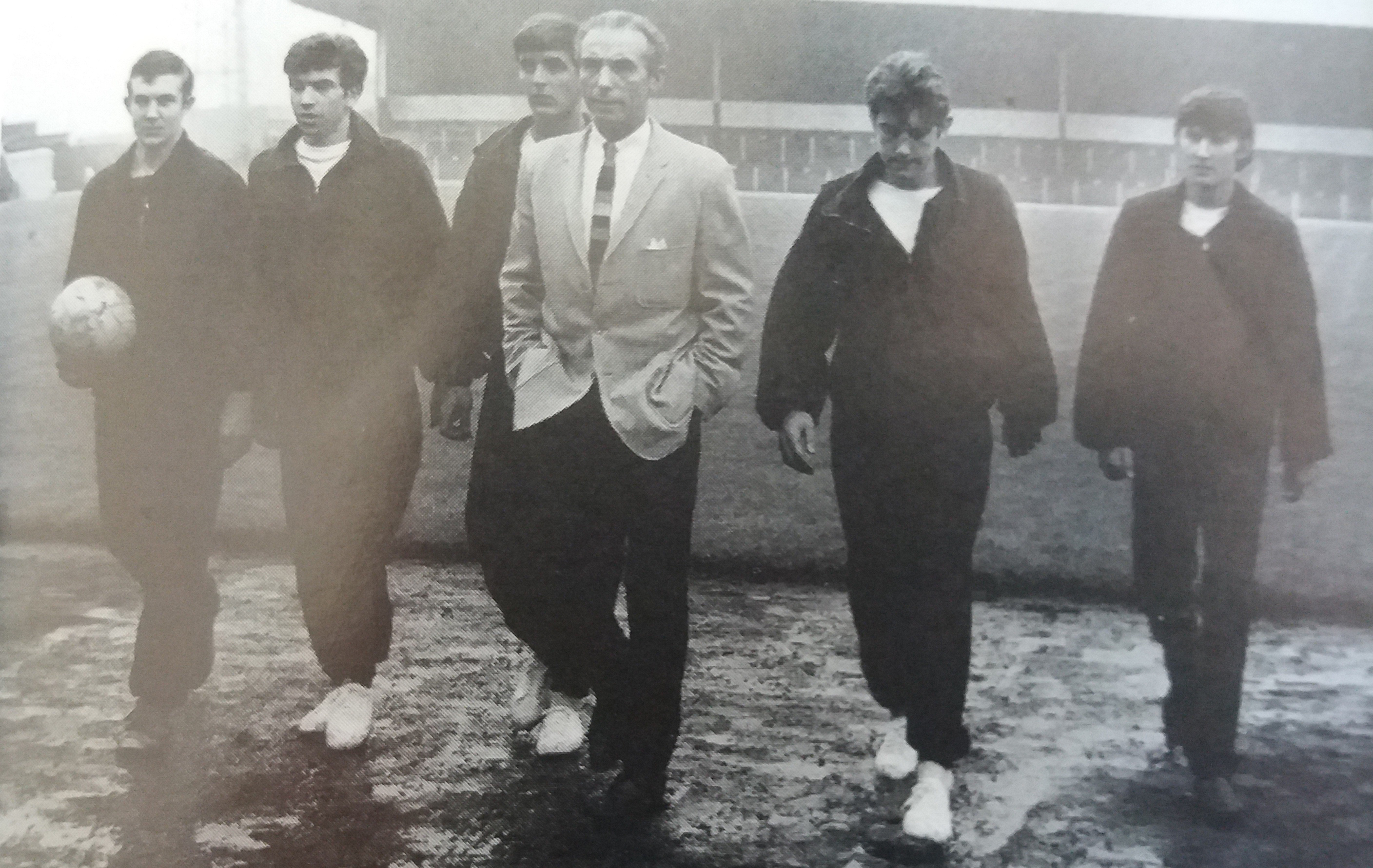
Stanley Matthews as Port Vale Manager with youth players

Stanley Matthews was made general manager in preparation for the 1965–66, his emphasis was strongly on nurturing young talent. As a demonstration of this, over 700 boys were given trials with the club. Centre-half John Nicholson made a club record 208 consecutive appearances before being dropped in favour of Terry Alcock. This unsettled Nicholson, who was soon sold to Doncaster Rovers for £5,000. That money was spent on bringing former Northern Ireland international Jimmy Hill to Vale Park. In a nod to the youth policy, in one game four teenagers made their débuts: Alex Donald, Roddy Georgeson, Mick Cullerton and Paul Ogden. At the age of 15 years 347 days, Malcolm MacKenzie made his debut against Newport County on 12 April 1966, the youngest player ever to play for the club. The club finished just two points away from re-election, in 19th position; they could hardly sink any deeper. Nearly £30,000 was lost that season; an average home gate of 6,000 would have to double for the club to break even.

After a good start to 1966–67, the previous season's top scorer John Rowland was sold to Mansfield Town for £6,500. A 'gloom' descended, multiplied by matters such as debt and the death of ex-player John Nicholson. The season tailed off, especially with new signing, former Wales international Mel Charles failing to impress. Just before the season ended, John Ritchie was sold to Preston North End for £17,500, to help pay off an £80,000 overdraft. On 8 May, Mudie resigned as player-manager due to 'personal reasons'. The club finished in mid-table with a financial loss despite making a profit in the transfer market. It was noted that 'the weekly income is insufficient to maintain the club. On a more positive note, the club awarded Roy Sproson the first Player of the Year award.

Numerous players were let go before the 1967–68 campaign began; a young Ray Kennedy's departure would be bitterly regretted over the next two decades. The club also 'reluctantly' accepted a £25,000 Blackpool bid for Terry Alcock. Two new signings were Roy Chapman and Mick Morris, both free transfers. The club took a pre-season tour of Czechoslovakia. In November, the FA launched an investigation into alleged breaches of rules on payments to players by the club. By January, the investigation became a commission, looking at charges of weekly wages for 'amateurs', playing schoolboys, extra bonuses for victories, and an illegal signing on bonus and other bonuses paid to John Ritchie, as well as bonuses to Clint Boulton and Gordon Logan, as well as gifts to young players that broke FA rules. In February, the club admitted to the charges and were fined £2,000, later doubled, and told that irrespective of where they finished in the table, they would be made to apply for re-election to the Football League at the end of the season. On 8 June they were readmitted to the league by 39 votes to 9. Stanley Matthews 'gradually drifted out of the picture' and Gordon Lee was appointed as manager. It was later revealed that Matthew's left being owed money by the club, which they never paid him, a key reason as to why he never managed in England again. In 1968–69, Lee won respect for his 'honesty and enthusiasm' as the club consolidated their league status. Bill Asprey retired to go into coaching in a quiet season for the club. Football hooliganism started to take its grip on the game, and Vale's early experience of it consisted of witnessing the Chester City team coach smashed with bricks. At the end of the season, the club were in debt to the tune of £178,277, with a £10,900 loss being made on the season. Already strict economies were tightened by the club hierarchy.

== 1969–1983: Just getting by ==
Over the summer of 1969 there were talks of bringing speedway to Vale Park, introducing a new team to the British League Division Two. However, many were opposed to the idea, and a 2,600 strong petition was given to local MP John Forrester. The idea was killed when the council failed to grant planning permission, despite a 3,000 strong petition in favour of the proposal. Port Vale dragged themselves out of the fourth tier and into the third in 1969–70, finishing in fourth place, three points away from the nearest competition. They had done this on the back of a solid defence, just about scoring enough goals to gather the necessary points. The club's chairman was arrested in February in a non-football matter and consequently resigned; he was replaced by Mark Singer.

The most notable fresh face for 1970–71 was Brian Horton, though at first, there was little to suggest how important the 21-year-old from non-League Hednesford Town would be. Soon into the campaign, four of the club's five directors resigned, claiming 'the club is being controlled by outsiders'. Long serving player Ron Wilson also left, emigrating to South Africa to look after his son, who was suffering with bronchitis. The club made a rare profit, though the fans were restless with a lower mid-table finish, despite Lee having built the squad on free transfers.

Young hopeful Sammy Morgan was persuaded to stay on for the 1971–72 campaign, as Lee largely stuck with the same squad. However, he warned supporters that low attendance would force him to sell his best players. The season was largely forgettable, though increasing violence from hooligans was a cause for concern. £30,000 was raised by sale of some land and £10,000 was gained from Tony Lacey's move to Rochdale. 'Troubles at the top' were eventually settled with the re-election of old chairman Mark Singer. Only 2,743 turned up for the final appearance of club legend Roy Sproson, as Lee became increasingly angered by low turnouts. Only eleven points were won at home, as the club finished in mid-table yet again.

Long-serving players Mick Morris and Keith Ball were released, as was John Flowers. Numerous new signings were made for 1972–73, most notable Ray Williams. After a 7–0 thrashing by Rotherham United – blamed largely on Alan Boswell, the side went on a run of five wins. Lee continued to bemoan the fans, saying 'the people here are not genuinely interested in league football', though he turned down a job offer at Shrewsbury Town out 'of loyalty to the players'. Vale went out of the FA Cup 1–0 to West Ham United in the third round, Ron Greenwood claimed 'we were lucky to come out alive' after Vale gave a physical display, though Lee defended his players 'enthusiasm'. What was indefensible However, was the violence of a minority of supporters, leaving two Londoners nursing stab wounds. In January John James went to Chester for £5,000. They finished the season in sixth, four points away from promotion.

Before 1973–74 was underway, Sammy Morgan was sold to Aston Villa for just over £20,000. The defence was strengthened with the signings of David Harris, Keith Chadwick and John Ridley. In January, Lee took the job at Blackburn Rovers. The appointment of Roy Sproson as his replacement marked a great change for the dressing room atmosphere, as Sproson was more relaxed and insisted upon a more 'entertaining' style of play. Ill discipline on the pitch caused Sproson to arrange a lecture by a local referee to calm his players down and avoid bookings. The club finished poorly, though avoided relegation. New signings for 1974–75 included Terry Bailey, Frank Sharp and John Connaughton. The club pushed for promotion but registered another sixth-place finish, again four points from promotion. This time it was their away form that cost them.

A dire financial situation meant seven players were released for 1975–76: John Woodward, Tony Lacey, Roy Cross, Bill Summerscales, Frank Sharp and Reg Edwards. Attempts to sign Wales internationals Mike England and Wyn Davies failed, and so Mick Cullerton, Terry Lees and Geoff Morris were the only new signings. Cullerton was in fine scoring form, though the promotion campaign fell away, and Horton was sold to Brighton for £30,000, which led to a healthy profit on the season. For the club's centenary celebrations a match was held with Stoke City, which finished 1–1, an impressive result considering the "Potters" were going through one of the most successful periods in their history.

The small squad barely changed for 1976–77; Kevin Kennerley and Ian Osborne replacing an outgoing Geoff Morris. The FA slapped the club with a £400 fine for poor discipline, the club therefore began fining players for unacceptable behaviour on the pitch. Terry Lees was sold to Sparta Rotterdam for £25,000. £12,000 this money was spent on striker Ken Beamish. Former England international Bobby Thomson was also brought in and quickly made captain. The club continued in their physical footballing ways, opposition manager Jimmy McGuigan describing it as 'the worst example of football thuggery I have ever seen' and Burnley captain Peter Noble calling Vale 'a bunch of kickers'. In the FA Cup, they lost to a crowd of nearly 50,000 at Villa Park in the fifth round. they clung to their third-tier status in the league, safe by only three points.

Before the 1977–78 season began, Tommy McLaren was released, as was Eric Skeels, Ian Osborne and coach Roy Chapman. David Harris also refused a new contract, for the same reason Sammy Morgan's £12,000 return did not go through. The club's hierarchy displayed their dissatisfaction with manager Roy Sproson. He was sacked in October and never returned to Vale Park. After a spell under caretaker manager Colin Harper, ex-Bury manager Bobby Smith was appointed to the job. He made Dennis Butler his assistant. In January, Neville Chamberlain became the club's first black professional. Colchester United's John Froggatt was also brought in for £10,000. With frugal spending out of the window, the club still almost broke even. The club was relegated to the Fourth Division in 21st place.

Seven players were let go before the 1978–79 campaign. Manager Bobby Smith left to take up the vacant management position at Swindon Town, leaving his replacement Dennis Butler to take over the reins at Vale. Forward Bernie Wright came in from Bradford City for £9,000. In August, the club broke their transfer record for Wolves midfielder Ken Todd, paying £37,000 for a youngster with just five league appearances to his name. John Frogatt was sold for £8,000, Terry Bailey for £2,000 and Mick Moore for £2,000. Ken Beamish also was sold to Bury for £35,000, whereas Vale bought his teammate Gerry Keenan for £15,000. £8,000 was also spent on Irishman Felix Healy. In late October, the club received a record £55,000 from Leicester City for John Ridley. Another club record was set when £40,000 was spent on Bury's Peter Farrell. The new signings did not bed down well, the fans were restless and Butler retaliated by calling them 'a bunch of yobbos'. The club recorded a loss of £52,000 in the hectic season, wages being doubled from £113,000 to £259,000 and the club's liabilities were now at £187,000. The club chairman stood down and was replaced by Arthur McPherson.

The 1979–80 season started with six straight defeats, including an early exit from the League Cup. Poor discipline also resulted in a £500 fine from the FA. Dennis Butler's short reign came to an end and Alan Bloor was made caretaker manager. In an attempt to shake things up, he dropped Bernie Wright in favour of young Neville Chamberlain. A satisfactory upturn in fortunes saw Bloor handed the management position permanently. In December, the club became the first in their division to strike a shirt sponsorship deal– with T.I.Creda. However, Bloor resigned, saying he 'did not have what it takes', reserve coach Gordon Banks was also dismissed. John McGrath was given the top job and appointed Torquay United coach John Rudge as his number two. To battle against indiscipline in the squad, McGrath issued two fines in his first fortnight. In February, he transfer-listed 15 players. At the end of the season, the club narrowly avoided facing re-election, and a loss of £82,069 was reported. Their 20th-place finish in the Fourth Division (88th overall) was the club's worst ever finish. However, local rivals Crewe Alex were three places below them, comforting the supporters.

Despite a massive clear-out, only two new signings were made in preparation for 1980–81; John Allen and Trevor Brissett both came in on free transfers. Little progress was made on the previous season, as the club finished 19th. The club also 'died in shame' in the FA Cup third round, defeated 3–0 by Isthmian League side Enfield. Nevertheless, McGrath noted 'the attitude is slowly changing [for the better]'. Record low average home attendance figures of 2,738 inevitably caused a financial loss on the season, though costs were being reduced.

McGrath tried and failed to re-sign Brian Horton for 1981–82, with £12,000 Ernie Moss being the most high-profile transfer, along with £15,000 midfielder Geoff Hunter. McGrath pointed out that 'forwards are much more important now' as the Football League changed the system so that wins were rewarded with three points instead of two. For the first time in a decade, the club made it into the second round of the League Cup. Colin Tartt was re-signed from Chesterfield for £15,000 as the club made a push for promotion. Injury problems eventually made promotion unattainable, though 70 points and a 7th-place finish gave cause for optimism, despite a club record low attendance for a league game of 1,924 in a goalless draw with York City on 1 May. Twelve home draws resulted in McGrath's observation that 'we blew it at Burslem'. Financially, a loss of £65,000 was recorded to bring the club's overdraft close to £250,000.

Another clear-out left eleven professionals on the books for the 1982–83 season. Four of the more important newcomers were John Ridley, Wayne Cegielski, Les Lawrence and Steve Waddington. In August, Mark Chamberlain and Mark Harrison were sold to rivals Stoke for a combined fee of £180,000. There was little option to sell due to the financial situation, though McGrath's plans were heavily disrupted. As a result, five players made their débuts on the season's opening game. A bold attempt to sign Mick Channon failed, forcing McGrath to settle for dedicated forward Bob Newton. The season finished with promotion, third place with seven points to spare. A profit of just over £100,000 was also made, reversing a seven-year trend of losses.

In preparation for 1983–84, Eamonn O'Keefe was signed for £10,000 from Wigan Athletic. The summer was dominated by reports that several players failed to sign contracts and were unhappy with the club. McGrath's tactics at the start of the season were more attacking than usual, and the results were poor as the club went 18 games without a victory. McGrath bemoaned the board's lack of support and was consequently 'gagged', only being permitted to talk to the press on team matters. On 26 November, Vale suffered a humiliating 7–0 loss at Burnley in front of the television cameras, all goals being scored in the first half. By December, Port Vale were nine points off safety, paying £9,000 a week in wages (the third highest sum in the division) and with home gate receipts averaging at £3,000. On the 6th, McGrath was suspended on full pay, despite a flurry of letters in support of him being sent into the club, 'some just abusive'.

== 1983–1999: The Rudge era ==
John Rudge took over the management reins at Vale Park in December 1983, after the sacking of John McGrath following the club's form upon Vale's promotion to the Third Division. Rudge said that 'we cannot change things overnight', though it did spark 'an amazing transformation of form' to oversee four consecutive home wins. The gap from safety was closed from nine to four points, and by March, he had 'achieved mission impossible' as the club escaped the relegation zone. However, a poor end to the season saw the club relegation in 23rd place. Positive signs for the future included a £50,601 profit and the rise to prominence of young striker Mark Bright. Yet Bright left in the summer, moving to Leicester City for £33,000. Top scorer Eamonn O'Keefe also requested a transfer but did not get one.

Rudge steadied the ship, slashing the wage bill by £20,000. A young Robbie Earle began to show his promise, though it was veteran Alistair Brown who was the season's top scorer, with 21 strikes. Considering Rudge's rebuilding effort with the squad, a mid-table finish was acceptable. In May 1985, young Welshman Andy Jones was purchased from Rhyl for £3,000. He was soon joined by £12,000 defender John Williams and numerous others. Vale were promoted back to the third tier in 1985–86, finishing in fourth place, losing just once at Vale Park. they went on an 18-match unbeaten run during the season, building their record largely on a solid defence. Jones and Earle scored 18 and 17 goals respectively. The only downside was the finances, as a loss of £79,474 was recorded, partly due to promotion bonus payouts. In the summer of 1986, new signings included Ipswich Town's reserve goalkeeper Mark Grew on a free, Aston Villa midfielder Ray Walker for £12,000, Sheffield United winger Paul Smith for £10,000 and Walsall striker Richard O'Kelly for £6,000. Rudge also turned down the management position at Preston North End. He also attempted to bring a young Steve Bull to Vale Park. After an unconvincing start to 1986–87, Rudge sold John Williams to Bournemouth for £30,000 and brought in Bob Hazell from Reading on a free. This helped transform the club's defence, while Andy Jones' fantastic record of 37 goals helped win the Vale a twelfth-place finish. The only worrying sign was a £53,373 loss, increasing the club's debt to £363,878.

A major change occurred before the start of the 1987–88 season, as chairman Jim Lloyd stood down and was replaced by hard-nosed businessman Bill Bell. Ten-year man Russell Bromage went to Bristol City in exchange for £25,000 and Lawrie Pearson, also Jon Bowden went to Wrexham for £12,500. Coming in was striker Darren Beckford for £15,000. Going into the season, Paul Smith went to Lincoln City for £40,000 before Andy Jones was sold for a then-club-record fee of £350,000 to Charlton Athletic. £35,000 of this went towards new full-back Simon Mills. The campaign was boosted by a 'famous' 2–1 victory over top-flight Tottenham Hotspur in the fourth round of the FA Cup. The cup run and sale of Jones had helped to pull in a record £410,239 profit. A boost for 1988–89 came with the sale of an unused training ground at Cobridge for £164,800. Halfway through the season, veteran Phil Sproson was advised to retire following a serious knee injury; to replace him, defender Dean Glover was signed from Middlesbrough for a club-record £200,000. The club finished third, failing to gain automatic promotion because of their worse goal difference. However, they found success in the play-offs, defeating Bristol Rovers in the play-offs 2–1 on aggregate.

Back in the Second Division for the first time in over twenty years, Rudge strengthened the side with £150,000 signing Neil Aspin from Leeds United, £125,000 striker Nicky Cross from Leicester City and veteran campaigner Ian Miller on a free. The 1989–90 saw many improvements to Vale Park, as on the pitch, the team did well to establish themselves in the division. They also triumphed in the FA Cup, putting three past Derby County's Peter Shilton in a third round replay victory. However, in the next round 'Villa went on a rampage', as they 'outclassed' the Vale with a 6–0 victory. They finished eleventh in the league, and the supporters were given much to cheer about as rivals Stoke City were relegated to the third tier, leaving Vale as 'the top team in the Potteries' for only the second time in their history.

Only one change was made to the squad in preparation for the 1990–91 campaign: Irishman Derek Swan coming in from Bohemians for £15,000 on a recommendation. The club considered building a new ground at Festival Park, but Bill Bell was 'frightened to death by the cost' and the idea was scrapped. The club finished in 15th place, with Darren Beckford once again the top scorer with 23 goals. They then went into a slump, leading to their relegation on the final day of the 1991–92 league campaign. In 1992–93, Vale narrowly missed out on promotion as runners-up to Reading when Bolton Wanderers pipped them on the final day. Vale then lost in the play-off final to West Bromwich Albion.

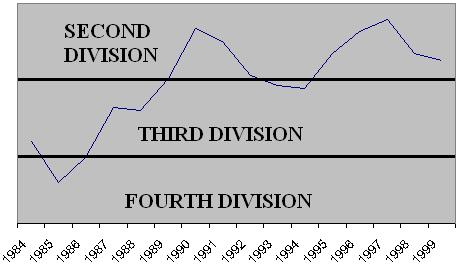
The club rose through the divisions under the management of John Rudge.

Vale were able to bounce back with Rudge's next two bargain buys becoming important players. Ian Taylor, whom Vale had signed for £15,000 from non-League Moor Green, and Dutch import Robin van der Laan (signed for £80,000) came to the fore. With Martin Foyle back fit and experienced Bernie Slaven up front, Vale surged to second place, confirming promotion on the final day with a 3–1 win at Brighton's Goldstone Ground in front of 6,000 travelling fans. Vale also notched another FA Cup scalp, beating then–Premiership side Southampton 1–0 at Vale Park in a third-round replay. Taylor became Rudge's first £1,000,000 sale when Sheffield Wednesday invested in the midfielder. The money was spent on bringing Steve Guppy and Gareth Griffiths to the club during the 1994–95 campaign. Vale finished 17th in 1994–95, avoiding relegation by ten points, and again despite the pre-season sale of van der Laan, who Derby bought for £475,000. Jon McCarthy and Lee Mills also joined before the 1995–96 season began.

During the 1995–96 season, Vale struggled to find their form. Ten games into the league season, they had recorded only one win (in the local derby against Stoke) and were struggling near the bottom of the table. Early home form was also the worst for years, and it took the Valiants until 2 December to finally notch a win at Vale Park, when Martin Foyle scored to beat Huddersfield Town 1–0. A 5–1 defeat at Ipswich on New Year's Day saw Vale slip to second from bottom, with just five wins all season, but the FA Cup was again to prove the tonic. The draw had done Vale no favours, with a trip to promotion-chasing Crystal Palace, but a goalless draw brought the tie back to Vale Park. Vale eventually won the tie on a freezing January night, with Ray Walker scoring the winner in extra time to seal a 4–3 win and set up a trip to cup-holders Everton in the fourth round. In the tie with Everton, Vale twice came from behind at Goodison Park to draw 2–2, with Ian Bogie scoring from virtually the last kick of the match. The replay saw Vale Park full to witness Vale win 2–1, with Jon McCarthy netting the winner. The victory saw Vale enter the fifth round, where they would play Leeds United away. Leeds were then a top-ten Premiership side. The match at Elland Road took place on a Tuesday, thanks to various cancellations due to inclement weather. The game finished goalless, and the tie went to a replay in Burslem. The Valiants' cup exploits were to come to an end as Leeds won the replay 2–1, with Gary McAllister scoring twice in the closing stages despite Vale leading 1–0 at half-time through Tony Naylor. However, Vale's cup exploits were to earn them the FA's Giantkillers award for the 1995–96 season. The cup run seemed to inspire Vale to do better things in the league, with five wins in a row pushing them up to twelfth as the season drew to a close. Vale also had some success in the Anglo-Italian Cup, as they qualified for the final at Wembley, in the competition's final season. Vale secured a 5–3 win at Italian side Perugia in which Lee Mills netted a hat-trick. The English semi-final draw pitted Vale away to Ipswich Town, to whom they had already lost 5–1. Tony Naylor scored a hat-trick as Vale recorded a 4–2 win at Portman Road, the first victory in their history at the ground. A 3–1 victory in the second leg of the English final at Vale Park against West Brom confirmed a 4–2 aggregate success and a game against Italian winners Genoa in the final. The Italians ran out 5–2 winners, with Martin Foyle netting both Vale goals.

Again, Vale made a slow start to the 1996–97 campaign, with only two wins from their opening ten league games. They enjoyed some success in the League Cup, however, beating local rivals Crewe Alexandra 5–1 at their Gresty Road home. A protest against chairman Bill Bell after a poor home defeat to Crystal Palace seemed to see an upturn in the Valiants' performances. A second win at Wolves' Molineux ground (1–0), in two seasons, was followed by a mixed period. In December they achieved three wins on the bounce, against ex-Premiership sides Charlton 3–1 at The Valley, 6–1 at home to Norwich City and concluding in a single-goal Boxing Day success at Manchester City in front of more than 30,000. Despite the sale of Steve Guppy to Leicester City for £800,000, Vale's form remained steady from then on, until five wins from six, from mid-March to mid-April, put them in with a chance of making the play-offs and, ultimately, a place in the Premiership. However, with three games remaining, Vale were to lose to Stoke City before Wolves came away from Vale Park with a 2–1 victory to end their hopes. Vale's final finishing position of eighth was their highest in the pyramid since 1931, when they had finished fifth in the old Second Division.

The eighth-placed finish was to be the height of Vale's powers under John Rudge, and the following season, 1997–98, saw a more familiar mid-table and, eventually, relegation battle. Another FA Cup tie was to see Vale hold eventual winners Arsenal to a goalless draw at Highbury and 1–1 at Vale Park (Wayne Corden equalising a Dennis Bergkamp goal) before the Gunners eventually prevailed 4–3 on penalties, despite Lee Dixon missing their opening kick. After three straight defeats, Vale found themselves in deep relegation trouble going into the final match at Huddersfield. Goals from Martin Foyle, Jan Jansson (two) and Lee Mills saw Vale claim a 4–0 win and an escape at the expense of Manchester City and Stoke City. 1998–99 saw Port Vale fare a little better, with an early League Cup defeat to Chester City setting the tone. After 16 years as Port Vale manager, John Rudge was sacked in January 1999 after one of Vale's most successful eras.

== 1999–2011: Valiant 2001 and two administrations ==
Rudge was replaced by former player Brian Horton, who had been working at Brighton. Dwindling fortunes, both on the pitch and financially, put relegation on the cards. Horton made five transfer-deadline day signings costing £1,000,000, and Vale managed a second consecutive final-day escape after losing just two of their remaining eight games. Although Vale lost by a single goal at Bury, the Valiants stayed up (at Bury's expense) by having scored more goals (this was the last of three seasons where 'goal difference' replaced 'goals scored' as the Football League's separator for teams on equal points; Port Vale's goal difference was substantially worse than that of Bury, but Bury had the lowest goals scored total in the entire Football League, consigning them to relegation). There was no escape in 1999–2000, however. Huddersfield eventually sealed Vale's fate with a 2–1 win at Vale Park, with Vale ultimately going down 13 points adrift.

A worsening financial crisis jeopardised the club's future by the end of 2000. Vale were in the relegation zone of the Second Division. After a FA Cup first-round defeat to Ryman Leaguers Canvey Island, the team seemed to be heading towards another relegation, with fans once again protesting against chairman Bill Bell. However, there was a change in fortunes after the turn of the year, as Brian Horton's team transformed their league form to pull up to a top-half finish while also gaining silverware by beating Brentford in the final of the Football League Trophy. This included a post–war record of 16 matches unbeaten in all competitions, with Vale eventually finishing eleventh. After the League Trophy-winning season, the Valiants lost the services of veterans Tony Naylor and Allen Tankard. Still, young prospects Steve Brooker, Marc Bridge-Wilkinson and new signings Stephen McPhee and Ian Armstrong were waiting in the wings. However, Vale suffered from inconsistency and finished the 2001–02 campaign in 14th place. With further discontent at the running of the club, a supporters' trust under the banner "Valiant 2001" started moves towards attaining ownership of the club, including several offers that were rejected by chairman Bell. The next season, 2002–03, was to see Vale's financial problems come to a head. With first-round exits in both cup competitions and another mediocre season in the league on the cards, Bill Bell eventually called in the administrators with the club around £1.5 million in debt.

Valiant 2001 eventually secured control of the club after a long and drawn-out process as the season neared its close. Bill Bratt became the new chairman, and even though the finances were slim for quite a while, Vale was relatively buoyant. On the pitch, a brief cameo from veteran striker Brett Angell had kept the club above the relegation zone before Christmas with seven goals in 15 games, and prodigy Billy Paynter helping out with five goals in a young-and-old partnership. However, due to financial problems, the funds were not found to keep Angell until November, and after a run of poor form, Vale slipped into the bottom four in March. With the concern of immediate extinction over and Horton's resourceful signing of experienced Adrian Littlejohn (who scored three goals), the final ten games saw an upturn in form, and Vale eventually finished in 17th place. 2003–04 was a new era for the club off the pitch, with the club coming out of administration under a new board of fan ownership. A reduction in match- and season-ticket prices saw around 3,000 season tickets sold. On the pitch, the club had ridden out administration by avoiding relegation (the ten-point penalty did not apply in 2003) with Brian Horton building a young, pacey side. The club made their best start to a season for many a year and found themselves top of the table at the end of September. Vale remained on course to at least be challenging for the play-offs come May. Their position in the table was based largely on the goals of an attacking front four: Billy Paynter and Adrian Littlejohn played on the right and left, while Steve Brooker and Stephen McPhee formed a partnership up front.

Despite a modicum of success, Horton left in February 2004 after the board revealed he would not be given a new contract on the same terms and his budget would be slashed due to cost-cutting after administration. He was to be replaced by former player Martin Foyle, who had been a success as the club's youth team manager. Horton left the team in seventh place, just outside the play-offs, and this was ultimately where the club would finish after a final day at Rushden & Diamonds' Nene Park. Going into the game, Vale needed a win to overtake either Swindon or Hartlepool in the play-off places and hope one or the other lost. However, the twist was that both these teams were playing each other and needed just a point to deny Vale a play-off place – unless, that is, Vale won by seven clear goals. Vale dispatched Rushden with a 2–0 win (Steve McPhee scoring both and taking his tally to 27 for the season), but Swindon and Hartlepool played out a 1–1 draw at the County Ground, thus meaning Vale missed out on goal-difference.

Foyle spent almost four years as manager after this, but the style of football the team played did him a few favours as Vale finished 17th and 13th in his first two full campaigns despite promising starts. Arguably the club's best recent achievements came in the two major cup competitions in 2006. Vale made it to the 4th round of the FA Cup in 2005–06, which was the club's first appearance at that stage since the club's giant-killing exploits a decade earlier. Vale were drawn away to Premier League Aston Villa but were defeated 3–1, holding the Birmingham side well into the 2nd period before succumbing to 2 Milan Baroš strikes and although Nathan Lowndes pulled one back, Steven Davis scored Villa's third.

The following season, the club set a record for progression in the League Cup, beating three Championship sides at home to set up a tie at Spurs (the first time the sides had met since Vale's infamous win 19 years beforehand). Vale again gave Spurs more than a run for their money, taking the lead through Leon Constantine, and were eleven minutes from a major upset before Spurs equalised to force extra time and eventually prevailed 3–1. The signing of Constantine was to prove a big success as he set a post-war record by scoring 19 goals before Christmas 2006. Coupled with exciting strike partner Akpo Sodje, Vale was up with the early pacesetter for League One in 2006–07. However, several runs of poor form saw the side fade away to finish 12th despite a striking partnership, which contributed 42 goals (Constantine 26, Sodje 16). This added to a shocking 4–0 F.A. Cup defeat to then League Two Hereford United saw fans start to lose patience with Foyle, although he remained in charge before the 2007–08 campaign.

A poor start to the 2007–08 season, in which several of Foyle's major signings did not live up to expectation, resulted in his dismissal on 4 November 2007, with Vale in deep relegation trouble. He was succeeded by Lee Sinnott, but Sinnott was unable to prevent the club from sliding into League Two after a 23rd-place finish, as well as crashing out to Chasetown (an 8th-tiered club) in the FA Cup second round. Financially, the club also suffered, recording losses of £383,738. 2008–09 was Vale's first season in the bottom tier of the Football League in over twenty years. Despite relegation, a positive pre-season once again followed, and a cut-price season ticket initiative took place to boost attendance and bring cheaper football to the masses. This saw Vale fans snap up 6,400 season tickets in readiness for what the club hoped would be a more successful season. However, it did not materialise, and Sinnott was sacked on 22 September 2008, after an unsuccessful start to their League Two campaign with the Valiants in 16th place, Dean Glover taking over as caretaker manager for the second time in twelve months. He was appointed as manager permanently on 6 October. Glover did initially oversee a slight upturn in form as Vale won at previously unbeaten (at home) Shrewsbury Town, which instigated a run of four away wins out of five.

After these highs, However, the poor form returned, with the club losing in the FA Cup second round to Macclesfield and ultimately losing out on a home tie with Premiership Everton. This was coupled with the club sliding back into the lower mid-table, which was a similar position to when Sinnott was sacked. 2009 began with fans starting to seriously question the board's motives and the direction the club was going in, especially when it was revealed former manager Lee Sinnott was taking court action against the club for a breach of contract after his dismissal. The 2008–09 season finished with the club in 18th place in League Two, only a final day win at Barnet ensuring the club avoided its worst ever points tally in the bottom tier of the Football League. After months of speculation, it was announced on 1 May 2009 that a new manager would be found for the 2009–10 season, with Dean Glover standing down from the role. Off the field, the club recorded a loss of £280,000 – £100,000 less than the previous campaign, having slashed the player wage bill by more than £600,000 to £1.12 million.

Adams watching his team defeat Aldershot Town 1–0 at Vale Park in September 2010.

On 4 June 2009, it was announced that Micky Adams would become the club's new manager. Adams made a solid start to his tenure impressing the Vale faithful with his honest attitude on the club's situation and did not take long to write himself into the club's history books. In his second match, a League Cup tie at Championship side Sheffield United, Vale ran out 2–1 winners. This became only the third time in the club's history that they had won away at a side two leagues above their status (the others were in 1954 and 1964, both in the FA Cup). In the second round, it was a case of deja vu, as Sheffield rivals Wednesday were dispatched 2–0. After a period of three defeats in seven days, including being knocked out of the League Cup in the third round, Adams decided to place his whole squad on the transfer list, saying of his team's performance: "We looked like a woman who had a big fur coat on but underneath she’s got no knickers on". He later admitted he merely played "a psychological game with them... [and] I don't think they fell for it – I don't think anybody fell for it". Nevertheless, they stormed into the play-off places for the first time in the season with just two games left to play. However, a loss and a draw saw them finish the season in tenth place.

History repeated itself for the start of 2010–11, with Adams leading Vale to their fifth-ever win over opposition two tiers higher than themselves, new signing Justin Richards scoring a brace in a 3–1 win at Queens Park Rangers in the League Cup first round. Adams left the club in December 2010, with Vale second in the table, after his hometown club Sheffield United chose him as their new manager. Jim Gannon was appointed to finish the promotion job, having already masterminded Stockport County's escape from the division some years previous. Vale lost ground during the transition phase, though hit the headlines for all the wrong reasons in February, after Gannon and assistant Geoff Horsfield had a bust-up during a pre-match coach trip, which resulted in both men leaving the bus to return to Burslem. This argument proved to be just the tip of the iceberg, and Gannon was sacked in March after alienating most of the fans, players and staff. This ten-week reign was the shortest in the club's history for a permanent appointment. Mark Grew failed to lift the club back into the play-offs, though at the end of the season supporters were delighted to learn that Micky Adams would be returning as manager.

Adams took up a position as director, while chairman Bill Bratt resigned as chairman and was replaced by Mike Lloyd. This, combined with promised investment into the club, quelled growing fan unrest. In September 2011, the investors were revealed to be sports construction firm Blue Sky International, who planned to plough £5 million into the club in twelve months and a further £2.5 million by 2016. This sum would secure the long-term future of the club. Bratt resigned as a director in October 2011, as the Valiant2001 era drew to a close. However, it quickly emerged that the deal was in jeopardy due to unforeseen 'contractual issues', and new chairman Peter Miller and CEO Perry Deakin came in for criticism from the fans after it was revealed that they had not purchased shares in the club as previously stated. In December, Blue Sky CEO Hank Julicher confirmed that neither his company or his family had invested any money into the club, and claimed that the £8 million deal the club had announced was pure fantasy. Supporters showed their disapproval against the board by displaying red cards in the home fixture against Aldershot Town, a game in which loanee Guy Madjo scored a hat-trick. By the end of the year, Deakin had resigned from his post and the board decided to end Miller's reign as chairman.

== 2012–2019: Smurthwaite's ownership ==
Genuine hopes of promotion in 2011–12 were brought to an end after the club were issued with a winding up petition by HM Revenue and Customs on 29 February 2012; the club were by this time unable to pay tax bills, creditors, or staff wages. The club entered administration on 9 March; the administrators appointed were Begbies Traynor. On 6 July, it was reported that Keith Ryder had completed his takeover of the club. However, after two months of being told Ryder would complete the deal "tomorrow", the administrators opened negotiations with other parties, as the new season drew ever closer. Instead, Paul Wildes completed his takeover of the club on 20 November 2012. The 2012–13 season was a resounding success, with Tom Pope scoring 33 goals to fire Vale to promotion back to League One with a third-place finish.

Paul Wildes stepped down as chairman and was replaced by Norman Smurthwaite in May 2013. The club continued to progress in the league during the 2013–14, consolidating their League One status with a ninth-place finish. Adams left the club following a poor start to the 2014–15 campaign, and his assistant, Rob Page, stepped up to lead Vale to mid-table finishes in 2014–15 and 2015–16, before quitting the club to take charge at league rivals Northampton Town. Smurthwaite appointed the club's first foreign manager, Bruno Ribeiro, in June 2016. A virtually new squad of foreign recruits arrived and the result was relegation back into League Two at the end of the 2016–17 season under caretaker manager Michael Brown, who succeeded Ribeiro on Boxing day. Smurthwaite issued a statement apologising for relegation, and stated that he would be stepping down as chairman and would no longer attend games as he looked to sell the club. An atrocious start to the 2017–18 season saw Brown sacked on 16 September with the club bottom of the Football League.

Stepping in to replace Brown, with the club now 22nd in League Two, was former defender Neil Aspin, with John Rudge returning as director of football. They managed to prevent another relegation, though the 20th-place finish at the end of 2017–18 was still the joint-lowest in the club's history. Aspin resigned in January 2019, leaving the club 18th in League Two. John Askey came in and steered the club clear of the relegation zone despite losing his first four games in charge. Smurthwaite threatened to put the club into administration if a buyer was not found by May 2019, a fate which was avoided when Carol and Kevin Shanahan completed their takeover.

== 2020–present: Shanahan's ownership ==
The 2019–20 was ended prematurely with the entire club staff on furlough due to the COVID-19 pandemic in the United Kingdom; now sole chairperson, Carol Shanahan voted to end the league early for the future financial health of other clubs in the division, even though it would cost the club a chance to improve on their eighth-place position and reach the play-offs. John Askey departed as manager with the team sitting 17th in the table in January 2021. David Flitcroft became the club's first ever director of football the following month and Darrell Clarke was appointed as manager. Port Vale's game against Harrogate Town on 5 April 2021 was the first in the English Football League where a woman referee was appointed to officiate. Though 2020–21 saw the team finish in mid-table, the club impressed off the pitch by being named as Community Club of the Year at the EFL Awards for "a staggering 300,000 food parcels and 6,000 phone calls delivered to those in need during the pandemic". Despite losing Clarke to bereavement leave for nearly three months, Port Vale finished fifth and qualified for the play-offs at the end of the 2021–22 season and defeated Swindon Town on penalties to progress through the semi-finals. Promotion was secured with a 3–0 victory over Mansfield Town in the final and Clarke dedicated the victory to his recently deceased daughter. Clarke was sacked in April 2023 following a long spell of poor results in the calendar year. He was succeeded by his assistant, Andy Crosby, who kept the club up, only to be sacked on 5 February 2024. Darren Moore signed a five-and-a-half-year deal to manage the club eight days later. Vale were relegated to League Two at the end of the 2023–24 season. Moore took them straight back into League One as runners-up to Doncaster Rovers at the end of the 2024–25 season. Moore left the club cut adrift at the bottom of League One in December 2025, being replaced by Jon Brady the following month. Brady was unable to prevent relegation at the end of the 2025–26 season, despite them reaching the quarter-finals of the FA Cup.

== Books ==
- Kent, Jeff: "Back To Where We Once Belonged!: Port Vale Promotion Chronicle 1988–1989" (Witan Books, 1989, ISBN 0-9508981-3-9).
- Kent, Jeff: "The Valiants' Years: The Story of Port Vale" (Witan Books, 1990, ISBN 0-9508981-4-7).
- Kent, Jeff: "Port Vale Tales: A Collection of Stories, Anecdotes And Memories" (Witan Books, 1991, ISBN 0-9508981-6-3).
- Kent, Jeff: "The Port Vale Record 1879–1993" (Witan Books, 1993, ISBN 0-9508981-9-8).
- Kent, Jeff: "Port Vale Personalities: A Biographical Dictionary of Players, Officials and Supporters" (Witan Books, 1996, ISBN 0-9529152-0-0).
- Kent, Jeff: "The Potteries Derbies" (Witan Books, 1998, ISBN 0-9529152-3-5).
- Kent, Jeff: What If There Had Been No Port in the Vale?: Startling Port Vale Stories! (Witan Books, 2011, ISBN 978-0-9529152-8-7).
