= Andy Smailes =

English footballer (1896–1978)

Personal information
- Full name: Andrew Smailes
- Date of birth: 21 May 1896
- Place of birth: Radcliffe, Northumberland, England
- Date of death: 1978 (aged 81–82)
- Place of death: Cardiff, Wales
- Height: 5 ft 9 in (1.75 m)
- Position: Left half

Senior career*
Years	Team	Apps	(Gls)
19??–1919	Blyth Spartans		
1919–1922	Newcastle United	73	(30)
1922–1923	Sheffield Wednesday	37	(13)
1923–1929	Bristol City	162	(14)
1929–1932	Rotherham United	26	(1)

Managerial career
- 1934–1952: Rotherham United (coach)
- 1952–1958: Rotherham United
- 1959–1961: Scarborough
- * Club domestic league appearances and goals

Andrew Smailes (21 May 1896 – 1978) was an English footballer who played as a left half. He made over 290 Football League appearances in the years after the First World War.

== Career ==
Andy Smailes initially played as an inside forward for Blyth Spartans. Smailes joined Newcastle United for £300 in October 1919. Smailes joined Sheffield Wednesday for £1,500 in October 1922. Alex Raisbeck signed Smailes in October 1923 for Bristol City in an exchange deal with Billy Walker. Smailes moved on to Rotherham United in August 1929. After retiring Smailes spent 18 years as trainer at Rotherham United before succeeding Reg Freeman as manager in August 1952. He led the club to the highest finish in their history in 1954–55 as they finished third in Division Two, missing out on promotion to the top tier on goal average. Smailes resigned as manager of Rotherham United in October 1958. Smailes also managed Scarborough for two years.

== Honours ==
with Bristol City

- Football League Third Division South winner: 1926–27
