= Ray King (footballer) =

English football goalkeeper (1924–2014)

Personal information
- Full name: Raymond King
- Date of birth: 15 August 1924
- Place of birth: Radcliffe, Northumberland, England
- Date of death: 19 July 2014 (aged 89)
- Place of death: Bangkok, Thailand
- Height: 6 ft 2 in (1.88 m)
- Position: Goalkeeper

Youth career
- 1942–1945: Newcastle United

Senior career*
Years	Team	Apps	(Gls)
1945–1946	Newcastle United	0	(0)
1946–1947	Leyton Orient	1	(0)
1948–1949	Ashington		
1949–1957	Port Vale	252	(0)
1957–1959	Boston United	26	(0)
Total		279	(0)

International career
1954	England B	1	(0)

Managerial career
- 1957–1960: Boston United
- 1960–1963: Poole Town
- 1963: Sittingbourne
- * Club domestic league appearances and goals

Raymond King (15 August 1924 – 19 July 2014) was an English footballer who played as a goalkeeper. He made 278 league and cup appearances in an 11-year career in the Football League. He was the younger brother of Frank and George King.

He began his career with Newcastle United but spent World War II in the army and also had to contend with a catalogue of injuries. After the war, he played for Leyton Orient, before injury again forced him out of the professional game. He spent time with Ashington before making another comeback in May 1949, this time with Port Vale. He was in goal for the "Valiants" in one of the club's brightest periods, helping them to win the Third Division North title and to reach the FA Cup semi-finals in 1953–54. He won one cap for the England "B" team. He later went into management with non-League clubs Boston United, Poole Town and Sittingbourne. He later worked as a physiotherapist and also spent time behind the scenes at Oxford United, Luton Town, Southampton.

== Early life ==
Raymond King, the youngest of three brothers, was born in the Northumberland mining village of Radcliffe on 15 August 1924. The family were evicted from their colliery house after his father was suspected of instigating a miner's strike. They briefly attempted to run a fish and chip shop, but had to give up the business when elder brother Frank accidentally burnt the house down. At age eight, he moved with his family to the town of Amble, where his father had secured a position as a check weighman. After he left school at age 14, King began a five-year painter and decorator apprenticeship. Not long after the outbreak of World War II, he spent two years serving in the Home Guard, under the command of his father. He was enlisted into the army in December 1942. He served in the King's Own Royal Regiment, leading his comrades to remark that "he even has his own regiment!".

== Club career ==
=== Early career ===
King began his career playing wartime football for Newcastle United, signing a contract of thirty shillings for every first-team appearance, plus a £10 signing-on fee. He made his first-team debut at age 17 against rivals Sunderland at St James' Park. In his autobiography, he states that the night before his debut he slept at a teammate's house, and had to sleep in an armchair after the teammate made gay advances towards him in the only bed in the house. The match, the last of the 1941–42 season, finished level at 2–2. However, during an army cup final, he received a blow on his left knee that resulted in synovitis. After recovering from this injury, defender Ron Suart under-hit a back-pass, and the resulting collision between King and the onrushing attacker led to a thumb injury. He rose to the rank of Corporal, and also guested for Chester City during World War II. In goal for the "Seals" at Goodison Park, Everton's Tommy Lawton hit a penalty shot so hard that it broke King's right wrist. He played 15 games at outside-right with his broken wrist in plaster. After his recovery, he continued to play for the "Magpies" in 1945, but again broke his wrist after punching the crossbar in an attempt to save a shot from Bradford Park Avenue's Len Shackleton.

He returned from his injury to play under Charlie Hewitt at Leyton Orient. He broke his left wrist in his debut against Northampton Town. He took his plaster off early and again broke the wrist in a reserve team clash with Charlton Athletic, leaving him in plaster until May 1947. This was his last game for the "O's", and soon after he departed Brisbane Road. After leaving the army, he returned to play in outfield Amble of the Northern Alliance, only to break his jaw. He returned from injury once again and was signed to North Eastern League club Ashington in 1948.

=== Port Vale ===
He joined his brother George at Port Vale in May 1949. On his arrival King stated that the Old Recreation Ground was like 'some shanty town out west' and compared the dressing room to 'a dungeon', despite which somehow he 'felt completely at home'. He immediately established himself between the sticks, making 43 appearances to George Heppell's three in 1949–50. However, his brother was sold to Barrow. The two never played on the same team again. King featured 33 times in 1950–51, in Gordon Hodgson's last season as manager. King survived Ivor Powell's 'reign of terror' at the start of the 1951–52 season, and remained with the "Valiants" for the beginning of Freddie Steele's reign. Powell never selected King, as club chairman William Holdcroft was in a dispute with King over accommodation he had given him. King played only 19 Third Division South that season and featured in just three Third Division North games in 1952–53, as Ray Hancock briefly established himself as the club's preferred goalkeeper. King was once again injured, this time after Steele severely damaged his hand during a practice match, apparently whilst still angry with King for conceding a goal to his brother in a defeat to Bradford City at Valley Parade.

The 1953–54 season was one of the most successful in Port Vale's history, as the club won the Third Division North title and reached the FA Cup semi-finals. King played all but one of Vale's 54 games that season, and was ably assisted by an 'Iron Curtain' defence consisting of Tommy Cheadle, Reg Potts, Stan Turner, and Roy Sproson. He kept 29 clean sheets during the campaign, a club record. He achieved this despite playing the second half of the season with a chipped bone in his right knee, following a knock sustained in a defeat to Hartlepools United at Victoria Park.

He missed just one Second Division game in the 1954–55 season. He played the FA Cup defeat to Tottenham Hotspur at White Hart Lane despite splitting open his hand. At the end of the season he was offered a £2,500 to throw the match against promotion-chasing Rotherham United; he refused the offer and saved a penalty that would have secured the "Millers" a promotion into the First Division. He featured 41 times in 1955–56, despite spending a brief period on the sidelines after being 'pole-axed' at Filbert Street by Leicester City duo Arthur Rowley and Willie Gardner. He played 39 times in 1956–57, but the arrival of new boss Norman Low signalled the end of King's time at Vale Park and the goalkeeper handed in a transfer request. After 275 matches (23 FA Cup and 252 league) he was sold to Boston United for £2,500 in July 1957, where he became player-manager.

== International career ==
King made one international appearance for England 'B' on 22 May 1954 when he played the first half in a 2–0 defeat by their Swiss equivalents before giving way to George Thompson at half-time. He later toured with the full England squad but never won a senior cap. He instead sat on the bench as cover for Reg Matthews.

== Coaching career ==
King managed Boston United from 1957 to 1960. The "Pilgrims" were elected to the Southern League from the Midland League in 1958. They finished third in 1958–59 and ninth in 1959–60. He departed York Street after former chairman Ernest Malkensen returned to the club and re-appointed former manager Ray Middleton. He then took charge at Poole Town, who had just released all but one of their first-team squad. He won one promotion with the "Dolphins", as they finished as runners-up of the Southern League Division One in 1961–62. He also led them to the first round of the FA Cup, before they then took Watford to a replay following a 2–2 draw at Vicarage Road. In 1963, he left Poole after only being offered a one-year contract and took the management post at Sittingbourne. However, he quickly left the "Brickies" after the club encountered trouble in paying his wages. King then coached at Oxford United under Arthur Turner. He gave pre-match massages to Ron Atkinson, who he stated had "the meatiest legs I had ever seen". King was offered the management position at Cambridge United. Instead, a pay rise convinced him to stay at the Manor Ground. However, he was sacked by Turner for 'disloyalty' after he applied for the management position at Cardiff City.

He made a return to the Football League in November 1971, when he was appointed youth team manager at Luton Town by Harry Haslam. His charges included future professionals Andy King, Alan Biley, Lil Fuccillo, and Dave Carr. However, he fell out with Haslam, and left Kenilworth Road during the 1974–75 campaign. He later did scouting work for Southampton, though he quit the role after finding his payment did not meet the costs of driving to watch the players he was scouting.

== Personal life and post-retirement ==
He married wife Norma in October 1949. They were one month off celebrating their golden wedding anniversary, when Norma died. Together they had a son, Gary, in 1951; he became an educator, who taught in Bermuda, New York, and Thailand.

After leaving Oxford, King dabbled in physiotherapy and worked as a masseur at RAF Brize Norton. He failed to find success as a private masseur in Poole, his only customer being a man who left after he discovered his belief that his wife Norma would be giving the massage was erroneous. He later worked as a salesman before becoming a P.E. instructor; in this capacity, he taught aspiring cricketer Mark Austin, who went on to become a well-known journalist.

After leaving Luton, King was employed by the Department for Education as a painting and decorating supervisor for a government training programme. Returning to physiotherapy, he built up a list of clients, including John Lennon. As a physiotherapist in the early 1990s, he was accused of sexually assaulting a female patient, and cleared his name following a four-day trial. He released an autobiography entitled Hands, Feet and Balls, of which only 1,500 copies were printed. In 2011, he released a second book, entitled To the End of the Road. He also wrote columns for the Bangkok Post and The Ambler, a newspaper based in his home town of Amble.

King died after a fall at his home in Bangkok, Thailand on 19 July 2014.

== Career statistics ==
Appearances and goals by club, season and competition
Club	Season	League			FA Cup		Total	
Club	Season	Division	Apps	Goals	Apps	Goals	Apps	Goals
Newcastle United	1945–46		0	0	2	0	2	0
Leyton Orient	1946–47	Third Division South	1	0	0	0	1	0
Port Vale	1949–50	Third Division South	39	0	4	0	43	0
Port Vale	1950–51	Third Division South	29	0	4	0	33	0
Port Vale	1951–52	Third Division South	19	0	0	0	19	0
Port Vale	1952–53	Third Division North	3	0	0	0	3	0
Port Vale	1953–54	Third Division North	45	0	8	0	53	0
Port Vale	1954–55	Second Division	41	0	3	0	44	0
Port Vale	1955–56	Second Division	39	0	2	0	41	0
Port Vale	1956–57	Second Division	37	0	2	0	39	0
Port Vale	Total		252	0	23	0	275	0
Boston United	1957–58	Midland League	26	0	3	0	29	0
Boston United	1958–59	Southern League; North-West	0	0	0	0	0	0
Boston United	Total		26	0	3	0	29	0
Career total			279	0	28	0	307	0

== Honours ==
Port Vale

- Football League Third Division North: 1953–54

Poole Town

- Southern Football League First Division second-place promotion: 1961–62
