= 1952–53 Port Vale F.C. season =

Port Vale F.C.
1952–53 season
- Chairman: Fred Burgess
- Manager: Freddie Steele
- Stadium: Vale Park
- Football League Third Division North: 2nd (58 points)
- FA Cup: Second Round (eliminated by Oldham Athletic)
- Coronation Cup: Runners-up (eliminated by Stoke City)
- Top goalscorer: League: Basil Hayward (22); All: Basil Hayward (22)
- Highest home attendance: 25,398 vs. Oldham Athletic, 6 December 1952
- Lowest home attendance: 6,000 vs. Bradford City, 20 December 1952
- Average home league attendance: 14,504
- Biggest win: 4–0 (twice)
- Biggest defeat: 0–3 vs. Oldham Athletic, 6 December 1952
Home colours

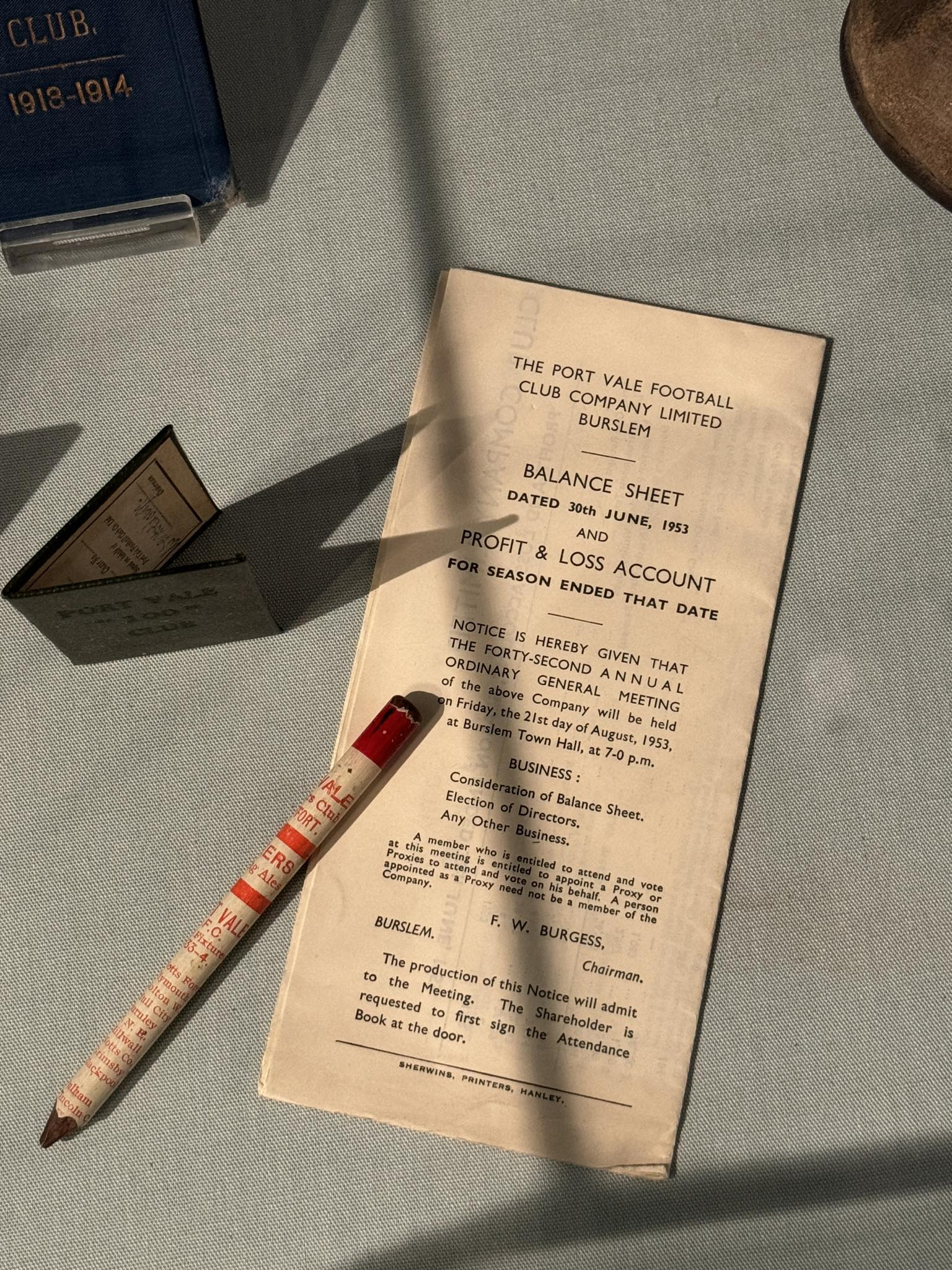
Port Vale balance sheet (June 1953)

The 1952–53 season was Port Vale's 41st season of football in the English Football League, and their first season (fourth overall) back in the Third Division North, following their switch from the Third Division South. It was the first in that section under manager Freddie Steele and chairman Fred Burgess. With a remarkably settled squad — just 19 players used all season — Vale narrowly missed out on promotion, finishing second by a single point on 58 points from 46 matches.

Vale's strength was defensive: they conceded just 35 goals all season, a foundation for the emerging "Iron/Steele Curtain" defence, while Basil Hayward was the club's top scorer with 22 league goals. In the FA Cup, Vale passed the First Round but were eliminated in the Second Round, and also finished runners-up in the Coronation Cup, succumbing to Potteries derby rivals Stoke City in that competition. Support at Vale Park averaged 14,504 per game, peaking at 25,398 in the December fixture against Oldham Athletic, while the lowest attendance was around 6,000 in December 1952 against Bradford City.

The 1952–53 campaign laid the groundwork for Vale’s outstanding 1953–54 season, with Steele’s emphasis on continuity, defence, and local talent reshaping the club’s identity.

== Overview ==
=== Third Division North ===
The pre-season saw the club switch from the Third Division South to the Third Division North, very much against the wishes of the directors, who believed a loss of income would follow. Manager Freddie Steele decided against making any new signings and instead kept faith with the young team he had inherited the previous season. Offers were made for some of the young prospects, but none were accepted.

The season began with a 1–0 defeat at Valley Parade with a goal from Ray King's brother George, managed by Steele's predecessor Ivor Powell. This did not affect the team's spirits, as they went straight on to a seven-match unbeaten run, conceding just three goals. The highlight of this run was a 5–2 home win over Rochdale. Steele picked up an injury and so selected the versatile Basil Hayward to replace him. A shrewd move, Hayward would go on to become the club's top scorer. It took a while to pay off however, as after losing 2–0 at Hartlepools United on 20 September, Vale went five games scoring just one goal. Steele attempted to sign a new forward, but to no avail. A 1–0 home defeat to wooden spoon contenders Accrington Stanley exemplified the club's trouble in front of goal. Also, it ended their record-breaking run of twelve consecutive home wins. Inside-forwards Albert Mullard and Ken Griffiths went 13 games without scoring. Steele and trainer Ken Fish put the squad to work on the special fitness regime they devised as the "Valiants" marched onwards.

Travelling to Boundary Park on 15 November, they beat Oldham Athletic 1–0 despite Norman Hallam missing the second half due to injury, taking themselves up into third place. On 13 December, Vale held league leaders Grimsby Town to a 1–1 draw at Blundell Park. They dropped points during the Christmas period, though picked up a useful 4–1 win over Crewe Alexandra at Gresty Road on Boxing Day. Vale played their first game against Scunthorpe & Lindsey United on 31 January, being described as "worthy winners" following a 2–1 victory. Three points out of a possible eight in February allowed leaders Oldham to pull away from the chasing Vale. In March, Oldham and Grimsby Town struggled. So Vale took advantage with six points from ten, conceding just three goals. This included a 4–0 home win over Scunthorpe & Lindsey United. With six of the final nine games at home and all of the chasing pack yet to visit Burslem, the omens seemed good for promotion. Vale duly remained unbeaten until the season's end, however, drawing five of these games proved not enough. The 4 April encounter with Oldham proved to be the title decider. Vale had dominated the game but conceded a fatal equalising goal in the 86th minute. Two draws against strugglers Chester were also costly. Nevertheless, they finished strongly, hammering Grimsby Town 4–0, Reg Potts scoring with a lob from 35 yards (32 m) out.

They finished second, a single point away from top spot. Steele's emphasis on teamwork had turned the team around and earned the club its best finish since their relegation from the second tier in 1935–36. Their defensive record of 35 goals conceded was bettered only by Second Division Huddersfield Town. Their tally of 58 points was second only to the club's extraordinary 1929–30 campaign. Their main weakness was an average offence, though Hayward proved to be a revelation with 22 goals.

On 4 May, Vale played Potteries derby rivals Stoke City, who had just been relegated from the First Division. This Coronation Cup match ended in a 2–0 win for Stoke, with £1,053 raised for charity.

=== Finances ===
On the financial side, a £1,676 profit was recorded. This was due to a club record average attendance of 14,504 – which took gate receipts to £39,929 – and a £5,000 slash in the wage bill to £18,246. For once, the club did not sell its best players, yet it also made a profit. Steele was rewarded with a three-year contract. He again kept on almost all of the squad, with two exceptions being Jimmy Todd (Wellington Town) and Norman Hallam (Halifax Town).

=== Cup competitions ===
In the FA Cup, Third Division South Exeter City were beaten 2–1 despite some "faulty finishing". However, in the second round, league leaders Oldham Athletic won 3–0 in front of a season-best 25,398 crowd at Vale Park – 8,000 of them Oldham supporters.

== Results ==
=== Football League Third Division North ===
==== League table ====
Pos	Team	Pld	W	D	L	GF	GA	GAv	Pts	Promotion or relegation
1	Oldham Athletic (C, P)	46	22	15	9	77	45	1.711	59	Promotion to the Second Division
2	Port Vale	46	20	18	8	67	35	1.914	58	
3	Wrexham	46	24	8	14	86	66	1.303	56	
4	York City	46	20	13	13	60	45	1.333	53	
5	Grimsby Town	46	21	10	15	75	59	1.271	52	

Source: rsssf.com
(C) Division Champions; (P) Promoted

==== Results by matchday ====
Round	1	2	3	4	5	6	7	8	9	10	11	12	13	14	15	16	17	18	19	20	21	22	23	24	25	26	27	28	29	30	31	32	33	34	35	36	37	38	39	40	41	42	43	44	45	46
Ground	A	H	H	A	A	H	H	A	A	H	H	A	A	H	A	H	A	H	A	A	A	H	A	H	A	H	A	A	H	A	H	A	H	A	H	H	A	H	H	A	A	H	H	H	A	H
Result	L	W	W	D	W	W	D	W	L	W	D	L	D	W	D	L	W	D	W	L	D	D	W	W	D	W	D	W	W	L	D	L	W	D	W	D	L	D	D	D	D	W	D	W	W	W
Position	20	7	3	5	3	2	3	2	4	3	3	5	5	3	3	5	4	4	3	5	5	5	5	5	5	4	4	3	3	3	3	3	3	3	2	2	4	4	3	2	2	2	2	2	2	2
Points	0	2	4	5	7	9	10	12	12	14	15	15	16	18	19	19	21	22	24	24	25	26	28	30	31	33	34	36	38	38	39	39	41	42	44	45	45	46	47	48	49	51	52	54	56	58

Source: Statto
A = Away; H = Home; W = Win; D = Draw; L = Loss

==== Matches ====
23 August 1952 1	Bradford City	1–0	Port Vale	Bradford
		Report		Stadium: Valley Parade; Attendance: 16,326

25 August 1952 2	Port Vale	2–0	Tranmere Rovers	Burslem
	Mullard; Griffiths	Report		Stadium: Vale Park; Attendance: 17,138

30 August 1952 3	Port Vale	5–2	Rochdale	Burslem
	Griffiths; Steele; Mullard; Bennett	Report	Gilfillan; Foulds	Stadium: Vale Park; Attendance: 15,448; Referee: ER Hill

2 September 1952 4	Tranmere Rovers	1–1	Port Vale	Prenton
		Report	Hayward	Stadium: Prenton Park; Attendance: 10,194

6 September 1952 5	Darlington	0–2	Port Vale	Darlington
		Report	Mullard; Hayward	Stadium: Feethams; Attendance: 8,600

8 September 1952 6	Port Vale	2–0	Stockport County	Burslem
	Steele; Mullard	Report		Stadium: Vale Park; Attendance: 15,185

13 September 1952 7	Port Vale	1–1	Gateshead	Burslem
	Steele	Report		Stadium: Vale Park; Attendance: 17,803

15 September 1952 8	Stockport County	0–2	Port Vale	Stockport
		Report	Bennett; Hayward	Stadium: Edgeley Park; Attendance: 10,142

20 September 1952 9	Hartlepools United	2–0	Port Vale	Hartlepool
	McClure 40'; Wildon 58'	Report		Stadium: Victoria Park; Attendance: 9,945; Referee: Tom Seymour

22 September 1952 10	Port Vale	1–0	Bradford (Park Avenue)	Burslem
	Hulligan	Report		Stadium: Vale Park; Attendance: 12,553

27 September 1952 11	Port Vale	0–0	Carlisle United	Burslem
		Report		Stadium: Vale Park; Attendance: 10,803

29 September 1952 12	York City	1–0	Port Vale	York
		Report		Stadium: Bootham Crescent; Attendance: 7,289

4 October 1952 13	Southport	0–0	Port Vale	Southport
		Report		Stadium: Haig Avenue; Attendance: 7,616

11 October 1952 14	Port Vale	3–0	Chesterfield	Burslem
	Steele; Sproson	Report		Stadium: Vale Park; Attendance: 14,352

18 October 1952 15	Workington	1–1	Port Vale	Workington
		Report	Hayward	Stadium: Borough Park; Attendance: 6,705

25 October 1952 16	Port Vale	0–1	Accrington Stanley	Burslem
		Report		Stadium: Vale Park; Attendance: 12,202

1 November 1952 17	Halifax Town	1–2	Port Vale	Halifax, West Yorkshire
		Report	Griffiths	Stadium: The Shay; Attendance: 11,693

8 November 1952 18	Port Vale	1–1	Mansfield Town	Burslem
	Hayward	Report	Adam	Stadium: Vale Park; Attendance: 14,103

15 November 1952 19	Oldham Athletic	0–1	Port Vale	Oldham
		Report	(og.)	Stadium: Boundary Park; Attendance: 21,407

29 November 1952 20	Wrexham	3–1	Port Vale	Wrexham
14:45 GMT	Tilston 2'; Tunnicliffe 29'; Hewitt 65'	Report	Griffiths 52'	Stadium: Racecourse Ground; Attendance: 11,082; Referee: W.H.E. Evans

13 December 1952 21	Grimsby Town	1–1	Port Vale	Cleethorpes
		Report	(og.)	Stadium: Blundell Park; Attendance: 13,801

20 December 1952 22	Port Vale	0–0	Bradford City	Burslem
		Report		Stadium: Vale Park; Attendance: 6,000

26 December 1952 23	Crewe Alexandra	1–4	Port Vale	Crewe
		Report	Griffiths; Hayward	Stadium: Gresty Road; Attendance: 13,962

27 December 1952 24	Port Vale	3–1	Crewe Alexandra	Burslem
	Hayward; Griffiths	Report		Stadium: Vale Park; Attendance: 22,478

3 January 1953 25	Rochdale	1–1	Port Vale	Rochdale
	Lynn (pen.)	Report	Hayward	Stadium: Spotland Stadium; Attendance: 6,899; Referee: ER Hill

17 January 1953 26	Port Vale	2–1	Darlington	Burslem
	Hulligan; Hayward	Report		Stadium: Vale Park; Attendance: 11,417

24 January 1953 27	Gateshead	1–1	Port Vale	Gateshead
		Report	Hayward	Stadium: Redheugh Park; Attendance: 7,785

31 January 1953 28	Scunthorpe & Lindsey United	1–2	Port Vale	Scunthorpe
		Report	Cunliffe; Hayward	Stadium: Old Show Ground; Attendance: 6,984

7 February 1953 29	Port Vale	3–0	Hartlepools United	Burslem
	Hayward 60', 86'; Griffiths 87'	Report		Stadium: Vale Park; Attendance: 13,919; Referee: Tom Seymour

14 February 1953 30	Carlisle United	2–0	Port Vale	Carlisle
		Report		Stadium: Brunton Park; Attendance: 10,419

21 February 1953 31	Port Vale	0–0	Southport	Burslem
		Report		Stadium: Vale Park; Attendance: 13,919

28 February 1953 32	Chesterfield	1–0	Port Vale	Chesterfield, Derbyshire
		Report		Stadium: Saltergate; Attendance: 9,772

7 March 1953 33	Port Vale	2–0	Workington	Burslem
	Bennett; Hayward	Report		Stadium: Vale Park; Attendance: 12,093

14 March 1953 34	Accrington Stanley	1–1	Port Vale	Accrington
		Report	Griffiths	Stadium: Peel Park; Attendance: 5,499

16 March 1953 35	Port Vale	4–0	Scunthorpe & Lindsey United	Burslem
	Cunliffe; Hayward; Leake	Report		Stadium: Vale Park; Attendance: 11,371

21 March 1953 36	Port Vale	1–1	Halifax Town	Burslem
	Hayward	Report		Stadium: Vale Park; Attendance: 17,945

28 March 1953 37	Mansfield Town	1–0	Port Vale	Mansfield
	V. Watson	Report		Stadium: Field Mill; Attendance: 6,083

3 April 1953 38	Port Vale	1–1	Chester	Burslem
	Griffiths	Report	Sutcliffe	Stadium: Vale Park; Attendance: 19,413

4 April 1953 39	Port Vale	1–1	Oldham Athletic	Burslem
	Sproson	Report		Stadium: Vale Park; Attendance: 24,499

6 April 1953 40	Chester	2–2	Port Vale	Chester
	Morement; Travis	Report	Cunliffe; Askey	Stadium: Sealand Road; Attendance: 10,553

11 April 1953 41	Bradford (Park Avenue)	2–2	Port Vale	Bradford
		Report	Griffiths; Hayward	Stadium: Park Avenue; Attendance: 11,790

13 April 1953 42	Port Vale	3–0	Barrow	Burslem
	Hayward; Hulligan; Mullard	Report		Stadium: Vale Park; Attendance: 10,010

18 April 1953 43	Port Vale	0–0	Wrexham	Burslem
15:15 GMT		Report		Stadium: Vale Park; Attendance: 21,585; Referee: W.H.E. Evans

20 April 1953 44	Port Vale	2–0	York City	Burslem
	Leake; Hayward	Report		Stadium: Vale Park; Attendance: 11,379

25 April 1953 45	Barrow	1–2	Port Vale	Barrow-in-Furness
		Report	Hayward; Leake	Stadium: Holker Street; Attendance: 5,080

30 April 1953 46	Port Vale	4–0	Grimsby Town	Burslem
	Potts; Leake; Mullard; Hulligan	Report		Stadium: Vale Park; Attendance: 7,964

=== FA Cup ===
22 November 1952 R1	Port Vale	2–1	Exeter City	Burslem
	Mullard; Griffiths	Report	Murphy	Stadium: Vale Park; Attendance: 14,394; Referee: N.C.Taylor

6 December 1952 R2	Port Vale	0–3	Oldham Athletic	Burslem
		Report		Stadium: Vale Park; Attendance: 25,398

=== Coronation Cup ===
4 May 1953 Final	Stoke City	2–0	Port Vale	Stoke-upon-Trent
				Stadium: Victoria Ground; Attendance: 9,981

== Squad statistics ==
=== Appearances and goals ===
Key to positions: GK – Goalkeeper; FB – Full back; HB – Half back; FW – Forward

No.	Pos	Nat	Player	Total		Third Division North		FA Cup		Coronation Cup	
No.	Pos	Nat	Player	Apps	Goals	Apps	Goals	Apps	Goals	Apps	Goals
	GK	(England) ENG	Ray Hancock	46	0	43	0	2	0	1	0
	GK	(England) ENG	Ray King	3	0	3	0	0	0	0	0
	FB	(England) ENG	Jim Elsby	2	0	2	0	0	0	0	0
	FB	(England) ENG	Reg Potts	49	1	46	1	2	0	1	0
	FB	(England) ENG	Stan Turner	46	0	43	0	2	0	1	0
	HB	(England) ENG	Tommy Cheadle	49	0	46	0	2	0	1	0
	HB	(England) ENG	Norman Hallam	8	0	8	0	0	0	0	0
	HB	(England) ENG	Albert Leake	26	4	24	4	1	0	1	0
	HB	(England) ENG	Albert Mullard	43	7	40	6	2	1	1	0
	HB	(England) ENG	Roy Sproson	48	2	45	2	2	0	1	0
	HB	(Northern Ireland) NIR	Jimmy Todd	12	0	11	0	1	0	0	0
	FW	(England) ENG	Colin Askey	10	1	9	1	0	0	1	0
	FW	(England) ENG	Alan Bennett	29	3	27	3	2	0	0	0
	FW	(England) ENG	John Cunliffe	19	4	19	4	0	0	0	0
	FW	(England) ENG	Ken Griffiths	47	14	44	13	2	1	1	0
	FW	(England) ENG	Basil Hayward	40	22	37	22	2	0	1	0
	FW	(England) ENG	Mick Hulligan	45	4	42	4	2	0	1	0
	FW	(England) ENG	Freddie Steele	11	5	11	5	0	0	0	0
	FW	(England) ENG	Derek Tomkinson	6	0	6	0	0	0	0	0

=== Top scorers ===
Place	Position	Nation	Name	Third Division North	FA Cup	Coronation Cup	Total
1	FW	England	Basil Hayward	22	0	0	22
2	FW	England	Ken Griffiths	13	1	0	14
3	HB	England	Albert Mullard	6	1	0	7
4	FW	England	Freddie Steele	5	0	0	5
5	HB	England	Albert Leake	4	0	0	4
–	FW	England	Mick Hulligan	4	0	0	4
–	FW	England	John Cunliffe	4	0	0	4
8	FW	England	Alan Bennett	3	0	0	3
9	HB	England	Roy Sproson	2	0	0	2
10	FW	England	Colin Askey	1	0	0	1
–	FB	England	Reg Potts	1	0	0	1
–	–	–	Own goals	2	0	0	2
			TOTALS	67	2	0	69

== Transfers ==
=== Transfers in ===
Date from	Position	Nationality	Name	From	Fee	Ref.
December 1952	FW	ENG	Derek Tomkinson	Burton Albion	Free transfer	

=== Transfers out ===
Date from	Position	Nationality	Name	To	Fee	Ref.
May 1953	FB	ENG	John Abbotts		Released	
May 1953	HB	ENG	Norman Hallam	Halifax Town	Free transfer	
May 1953	HB	NIR	Jimmy Todd	Wellington Town	Free transfer	
Summer 1953	FW	ENG	Freddie Steele	Retired		
