= Frank King (footballer) =

English footballer

Personal information
- Date of birth: 13 March 1917
- Place of birth: Alnwick, England
- Date of death: c. 2003 (aged 85–86)
- Height: 5 ft 9 1/2 in (1.77 m)
- Position: Goalkeeper

Senior career*
Years	Team	Apps	(Gls)
- Blyth Spartans
1933–1937	Everton	13	(0)
1938–1939	Derby County		
- * Club domestic league appearances and goals

Frank King (13 March 1917 – c. 2003) was an English football goalkeeper who played for Blyth Spartans, Everton, and Derby County in the 1930s. He played five First Division games for the "Toffees" in both 1934–35 and 1935–36, and three times in 1936–37. He kept goal in the Merseyside derby at the age of 17. However, he was unable to trouble the club's firmly established number one, Ted Sagar, and was transferred to Derby. There he picked up an injury after a challenge from Stoke City's Freddie Steele. Further injury problems forced his retirement at age 22, at which point he joined the police force. He guested for Southport during World War II. After the war he worked as a physio at Leicester City, Luton Town, and the Football Association. He died at the age of 86. He was the brother of former footballers George and Ray King.
