= Ray Hancock =

English footballer

Personal information
- Full name: Charles Raymond Hancock
- Date of birth: 16 February 1925
- Place of birth: Stoke-on-Trent, England
- Date of death: 20 April 2007 (aged 82)
- Place of death: Stoke-on-Trent, England
- Position: Goalkeeper

Youth career
- Abbey Hulton United
- Bury

Senior career*
Years	Team	Apps	(Gls)
1948–1956	Port Vale	50	(0)
- Northwich Victoria
- * Club domestic league appearances and goals

Charles Raymond Hancock (16 February 1925 – 20 April 2007) was an English football goalkeeper. He was Ken Hancock's elder brother. He played for Port Vale between 1948 and 1956 and later turned out for Northwich Victoria. He was Vale's regular custodian as the club finished second in the Third Division North in 1952–53.

== Career ==
Hancock played for Abbey Hulton United and Bury before joining Port Vale in May 1948. He made three Third Division South appearances in the 1948–49 campaign, but manager Gordon Hodgson kept him behind George Heppell and Ray King in the first-team pecking order. Hancock, now aged 27, was selected by manager Freddie Steele as the club's first-team goalkeeper in the 1952–53 season, as Vale posted a second-place finish in the Third Division North. However, King regained his first-team spot in the 1953–54 season, as Vale won the league title and reached the semi-finals of the FA Cup – Hancock featured just once all season. He played one Second Division game in 1954–55 and featured twice in 1955–56. Having made 53 appearances in all competitions for the "Valiants" he departed Vale Park when he was transferred to Northwich Victoria in the summer of 1956.

== Personal life ==
Hancock married Joan, a schoolteacher, in 1949. He worked at Masons Textiles in Leek, Staffordshire for many years.

== Career statistics ==
Appearances and goals by club, season and competition
Club	Season	League			FA Cup		Total	
Club	Season	Division	Apps	Goals	Apps	Goals	Apps	Goals
Port Vale	1948–49	Third Division South	3	0	0	0	3	0
Port Vale	1949–50	Third Division South	0	0	0	0	0	0
Port Vale	1950–51	Third Division South	0	0	0	0	0	0
Port Vale	1951–52	Third Division South	0	0	0	0	0	0
Port Vale	1952–53	Third Division North	43	0	2	0	45	0
Port Vale	1953–54	Third Division North	1	0	0	0	1	0
Port Vale	1954–55	Second Division	1	0	0	0	1	0
Port Vale	1955–56	Second Division	2	0	0	0	2	0
Port Vale	Total		50	0	2	0	52	0

== Honours ==
Port Vale

- Football League Third Division North: 1953–54
