= Reg Potts =

English footballer (1927–1996)

Personal information
- Full name: Reginald Potts
- Date of birth: 31 July 1927
- Place of birth: Etruria, Stoke-on-Trent, England
- Date of death: 28 January 1996 (aged 68)
- Place of death: Hartshill, Stoke-on-Trent, England
- Position: Left-back

Youth career
- Wellington Scouts
- Northwood Mission
- Stoke City

Senior career*
Years	Team	Apps	(Gls)
1945–1957	Port Vale	277	(3)
- Worcester City
1960–1962	Macclesfield Town	25	(0)
Total		302	(3)
- * Club domestic league appearances and goals

Reginald Potts (31 July 1927 – 28 January 1996) was an English football left-back, nicknamed "Dan" after Desperate Dan.

A key member of Port Vale's history, he played 296 competitive games for the club between 1945 and 1957. He helped the "Valiants" to win the Third Division North title and to reach the FA Cup semi-finals in 1953–54. He later turned out for non-League sides Worcester City and Macclesfield Town.

== Career ==
Potts played for Wellington Scouts, Northwood Mission and Stoke City before joining Port Vale in August 1945. National service interrupted his career however, and he could only be regularly picked by Vale from February 1952. He did though feature in 19 Third Division South games in 1948–49, and also played three games in 1949–50 and 25 games in 1950–51 under the stewardship of Gordon Hodgson. He scored his first senior goal on 27 March 1950, in a 2–0 win over Torquay United at the Old Recreation Ground.

Potts featured 21 times in 1951–52, as short-term boss Ivor Powell was replaced by Freddie Steele. He was an ever-present during the 1952–53 season, as the "Valiants" finished as runners-up of the Third Division North. He also managed to score a 35 yards (32 m) lob at Vale Park in a 4–0 win over Grimsby Town on 30 April. In the 1953–54 season, the "Iron Curtain" defence of Ray King (goalkeeper), Tommy Cheadle, Potts, Stan Turner and Roy Sproson were a key part of Vale's success in winning the league and reaching the FA Cup semi-finals. He served as the club's vice-captain.

He was an ever-present in the 1954–55 season, as the club posted a 17th-place finish in the Second Division. He also played every game in the 1955–56 season, as part of his 167 consecutive appearances between October 1953 and April 1957. He featured 41 times in 1956–57, as new manager Norman Low failed to prevent Vale slipping to relegation. Former teammate Graham Barnett later recalled how Potts and fellow defender Stan Turner did not get along and refused to speak to each other despite playing alongside each other for eight years. Potts was sold to Southern League side Worcester City in July 1957, later moving on to Macclesfield Town in 1960, becoming a key player for the "Silkmen" until he lost his first-team place in February 1961.

== Career statistics ==
Appearances and goals by club, season and competition
Club	Season	League			FA Cup		Total	
Club	Season	Division	Apps	Goals	Apps	Goals	Apps	Goals
Port Vale	1948–49	Third Division South	19	0	0	0	19	0
Port Vale	1949–50	Third Division South	3	1	0	0	3	1
Port Vale	1950–51	Third Division South	23	0	2	0	25	0
Port Vale	1951–52	Third Division South	21	0	0	0	21	0
Port Vale	1952–53	Third Division North	46	1	2	0	48	1
Port Vale	1953–54	Third Division North	42	0	8	0	50	0
Port Vale	1954–55	Second Division	42	0	3	0	45	0
Port Vale	1955–56	Second Division	42	0	2	0	44	0
Port Vale	1956–57	Second Division	39	1	2	0	41	1
Port Vale	Total		277	3	19	0	296	3
Macclesfield Town	1960–61	Cheshire County League	24	0	6	0	30	0
Macclesfield Town	1961–62	Cheshire County League	1	0	0	0	1	0
Macclesfield Town	Total		25	0	6	0	31	0
Total			302	3	25	0	327	3

== Honours ==
Port Vale

- Football League Third Division North: 1953–54
