= Ben Davies (1880s footballer) =

English footballer

Personal information
- Position: Forward

Senior career*
| Years | Team | Apps | (Gls) |
| 1882–1887 | Port Vale | 0 | (0) |
| Total | | 0 | (0) |
- * Club domestic league appearances and goals

Ben Davies was a footballer in the 19th century for Port Vale.

== Career ==
Davies played at inside-right in Port Vale's first recorded line-up in a 5–1 defeat at nearby Stoke on 9 December 1882 in a Staffordshire Senior Cup second round replay. He scored a goal in the 4–2 win over Leek in the replayed final of the North Staffordshire Charity Challenge Cup on 28 April 1883, as well as in the 12–0 Burslem Challenge Cup final win over Ironbridge on 21 March 1885. He also played in all five rounds of the 1885–86 FA Cup campaign and also made the North Staffordshire Charity Challenge Cup final side of 1885. In total, he scored 35 goals in 79 games over all competitions before losing his place at the start of the 1886–87 season and being released, most likely in 1887.

== Career statistics ==
Appearances and goals by club, season and competition
| Club | Season | League | | | FA Cup | | Other | | Total | |
| Club | Season | Division | Apps | Goals | Apps | Goals | Apps | Goals | Apps | Goals |
|---|---|---|---|---|---|---|---|---|---|---|
| Port Vale | 1882–83 | – | 0 | 0 | 0 | 0 | 2 | 1 | 2 | 1 |
| Port Vale | 1883–84 | – | 0 | 0 | 0 | 0 | 14 | 2 | 14 | 2 |
| Port Vale | 1884–85 | – | 0 | 0 | 0 | 0 | 34 | 14 | 34 | 14 |
| Port Vale | 1885–86 | – | 0 | 0 | 6 | 0 | 23 | 18 | 29 | 18 |
| Port Vale | 1886–87 | – | 0 | 0 | 0 | 0 | 2 | 0 | 2 | 0 |
| Total | | | 0 | 0 | 6 | 0 | 75 | 35 | 81 | 35 |

== Honours ==
Port Vale

- North Staffordshire Charity Challenge Cup: 1883, 1885 (shared)
- Burslem Challenge Cup: 1885
