= George King (footballer, born 1923) =

English footballer (1923-2009)

Personal information
- Full name: George King
- Date of birth: 5 January 1923
- Place of birth: Warkworth, Northumberland, England
- Date of death: 2009 (age 86)
- Position: Forward

Youth career
- Royal Air Force

Senior career*
Years	Team	Apps	(Gls)
1946–1947	Newcastle United	2	(0)
1947–1949	Hull City	3	(0)
1949–1950	Port Vale	10	(5)
1950–1952	Barrow	86	(37)
1952	Bradford City	23	(9)
1952–1953	Gillingham	19	(5)
- King's Lynn
- Ely City
Total		143	(56)

Managerial career
- 1955–19??: Ely City
- * Club domestic league appearances and goals

George King (5 January 1923 – 2009) was an English footballer. A forward, he scored 59 goals in 164 league games in a seven-year career in the Football League. He was the brother of goalkeepers Frank and Ray King.

King began his career with Newcastle United following the conclusions of World War II. He had a brief spell with Hull City before joining Port Vale in April 1949. He impressed for the "Valiants" and was sold to Barrow for a four-figure fee in February 1950. He scored more than half of his career goals for the "Bluebirds" before he enjoyed brief stays with Bradford City and Gillingham. He later played for non-League clubs King's Lynn and Ely City.

== Early life ==
King grew up in Amble after being born in Warkworth and worked as a grocer's apprentice before establishing himself in professional football. His brothers Frank and Ray also became professional goalkeepers. Alongside football, King played cricket for Amble Cricket Club during the summer and was an accomplished all-rounder.

== Career ==
King played for the Royal Air Force during World War II. During the war, he narrowly escaped death when he was aboard a ship that was sunk by a U-boat. He signed with Newcastle United in 1945, despite interest from Burnley. He played two Second Division games in 1946–47, before injury restricted his progress. He swapped St James' Park for Boothferry Park when he transferred to Hull City. King joined Hull City in March 1948 and made his debut as a replacement for Norman Moore in the final stages of the 1947–48 season. He made one further Third Division North appearance for the "Tigers" in October 1948 before leaving the club in April 1949.

He joined Port Vale for a four-figure fee in April 1949. His brother Ray was a player there and the two played alongside each other. He scored twice on his debut, a 3–1 win over Torquay United at the Old Recreation Ground on 23 April. He scored three goals in eight Third Division South games in 1949–50, but lost his place in October 1949. He was sold to Barrow for a four-figure fee in February 1950 by manager Gordon Hodgson. King scored a hat-trick against Halifax Town in March 1950 and finished the following season as Barrow's leading scorer with 20 goals. He scored 35 goals in 86 Third Division North games for Jack Hacking's "Bluebirds", before leaving Holker Street for Bradford City on a £4,500 transfer. His £4,500 transfer was reportedly a record fee paid between clubs in the Third Division North.

King scored nine times in 23 games for Ivor Powell's "Bantams" in 1952–53 in a brief stay at Valley Parade. He later scored five goals in 21 Third Division South games for Archie Clark's Gillingham. King left Priestfield and the Football League and played for United Counties League side King's Lynn before he was appointed player-coach at Cambridgeshire League side Ely City, becoming the club's first manager in June 1955. He led the club to the first round of the FA Cup in 1956–57, at which point they lost out to Torquay United. After retiring, he became a chiropodist. He died in 2009, having suffered with alzheimer's disease.

== Career statistics ==
Appearances and goals by club, season and competition
Club	Season	League			FA Cup		Total	
Club	Season	Division	Apps	Goals	Apps	Goals	Apps	Goals
Newcastle United	1946–47	Second Division	2	0	0	0	2	0
Hull City	1947–48	Third Division North	2	0	0	0	2	0
Hull City	1948–49	Third Division North	1	0	0	0	1	0
Hull City	Total		3	0	0	0	3	0
Port Vale	1948–49	Third Division South	2	2	0	0	2	2
Port Vale	1949–50	Third Division South	8	3	0	0	8	3
Port Vale	Total		10	5	0	0	10	5
Barrow	1949–50	Third Division North	17	12	0	0	17	12
Barrow	1950–51	Third Division North	45	19	1	1	46	20
Barrow	1951–52	Third Division North	24	6	0	0	24	6
Barrow	Total		86	37	1	1	87	38
Bradford City	1951–52	Third Division North	19	8	0	0	19	8
Bradford City	1952–53	Third Division North	4	1	0	0	4	1
Bradford City	Total		23	9	0	0	23	9
Gillingham	1952–53	Third Division South	19	5	2	0	21	5
Career total			143	56	3	1	146	57
