= Stan Turner (footballer) =

English footballer

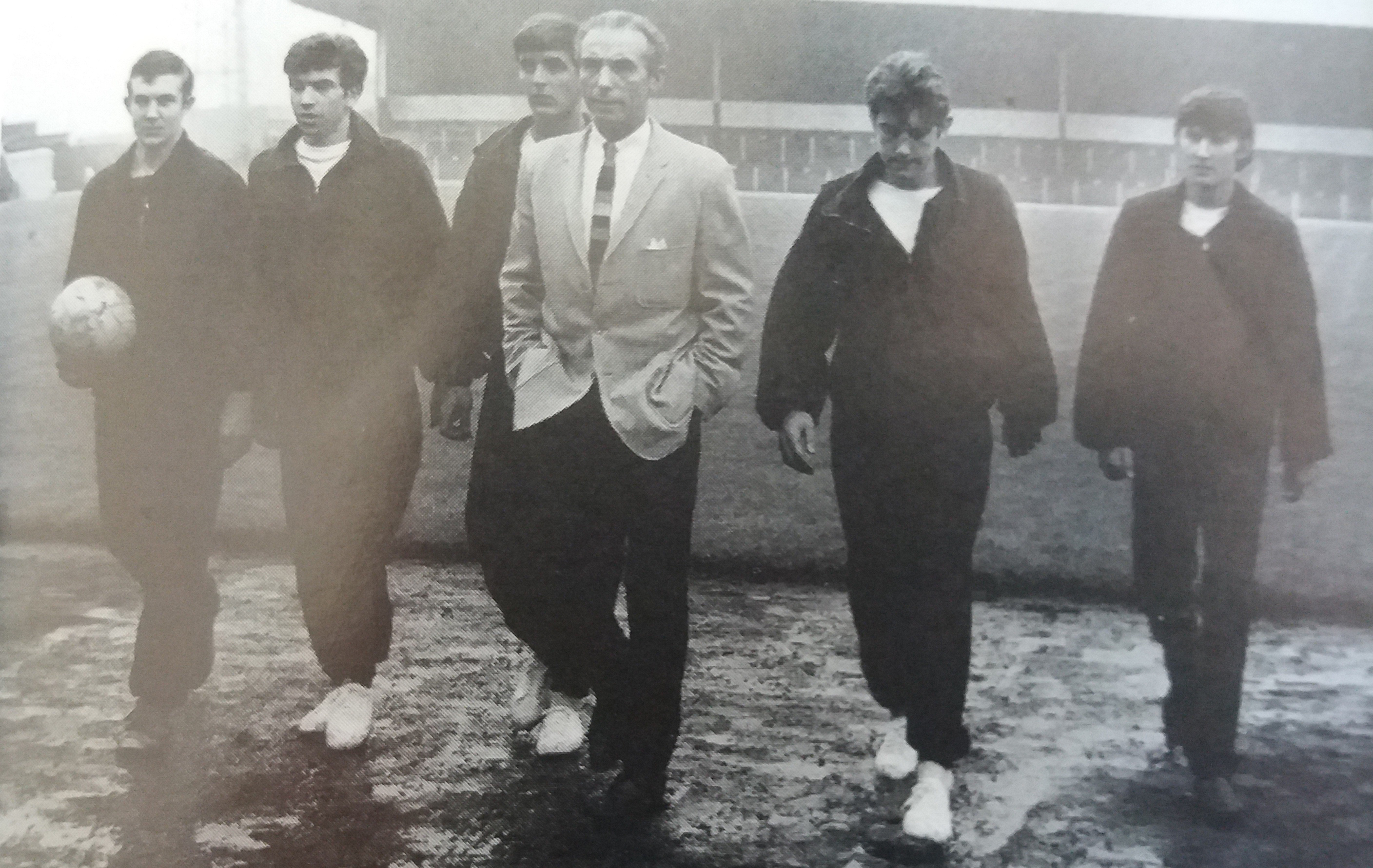
- Brian Wharburton, Paul Bannister, John James, Stanley Matthews, John Bostock and Turner (left to right)

Personal information
- Full name: Stanley Simpson Turner
- Date of birth: 21 October 1926
- Place of birth: Bucknall, Stoke-on-Trent, England
- Date of death: 28 April 1991 (aged 64)
- Place of death: Bentilee, Stoke-on-Trent, England
- Position: Right-back

Senior career*
Years	Team	Apps	(Gls)
1949–1957	Port Vale	227	(0)
- Worcester City
- Burton Albion
- * Club domestic league appearances and goals

Stanley Simpson Turner (21 October 1926 – 28 April 1991) was an English footballer. A tough-tackling right-back, he made 246 appearances (227 in the league and 18 in the FA Cup) for Port Vale during one of the club's brightest periods. He helped the "Valiants" to win the Third Division North title and to reach the FA Cup semi-finals in 1953–54.

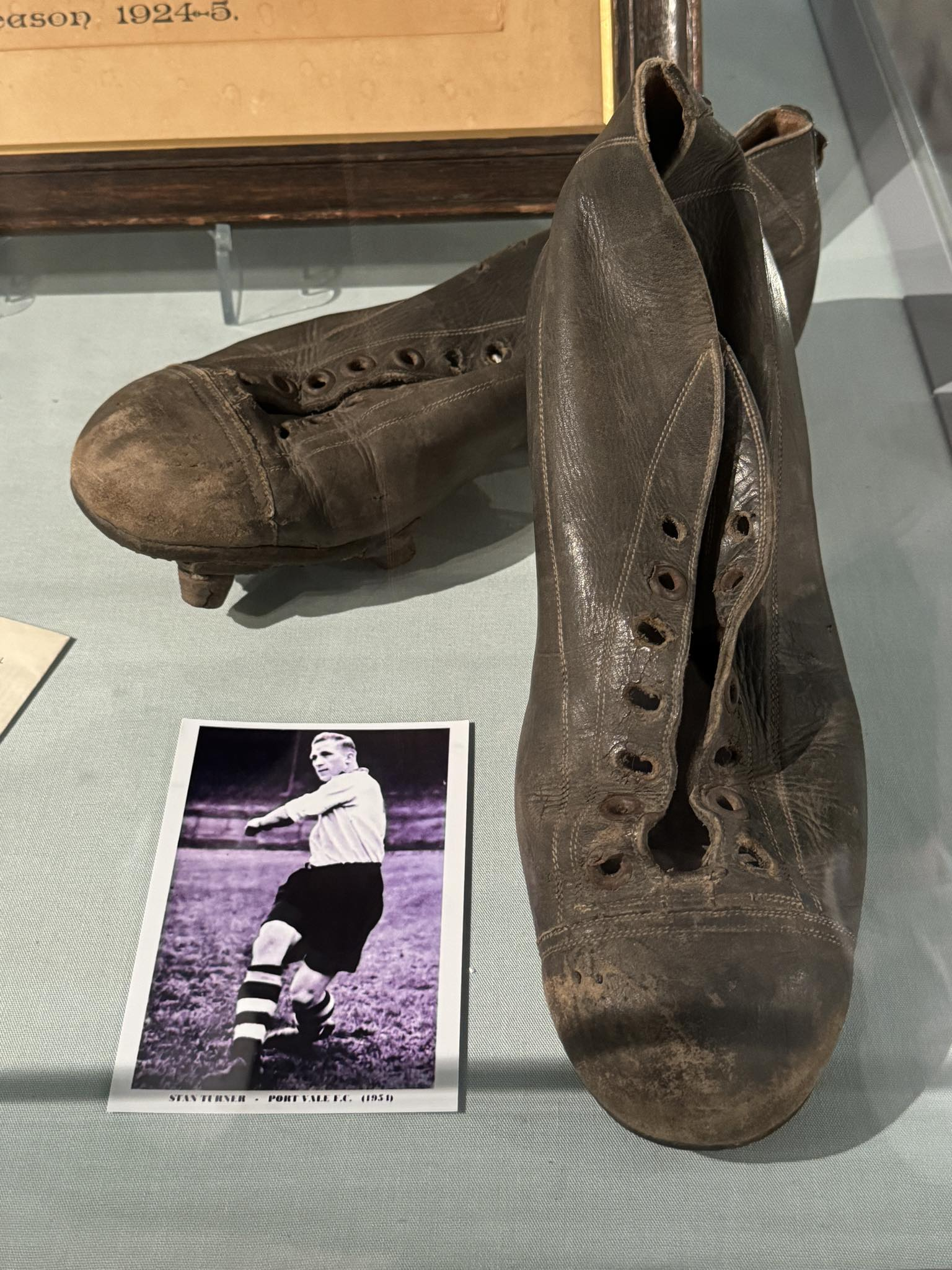
A pair of Turner's boots at a Potteries Museum display

== Career ==
Turner served with the North Staffordshire Regiment in India during World War II, playing football alongside Jim Lewis. He joined Port Vale in March 1949, debuting a year later. He featured in six Third Division South games in 1950–51 under the stewardship of Gordon Hodgson. After Ivor Powell's brief reign at Vale Park, Turner established himself in the first-team under Freddie Steele, playing 40 games in 1951–52. He featured 46 times in 1952–53, as the "Valiants" finished second in the Third Division North.

In 1953–54, he was part of the "Iron Curtain" defence – along with Ray King (goalkeeper), Tommy Cheadle, Reg Potts and Roy Sproson – that won the league title and reached the FA Cup semi-finals. He played 42 Second Division games in 1954–55, but was restricted to 28 appearances in 1955–56 due to a cartilage operation. He played just 29 games in 1956–57, and was transferred to Worcester City (Southern League) in July 1957 by new manager Norman Low. He later played for Burton Albion.

== Style of play ==
Former teammate Roy Sproson said: "[he was] an immaculate reader of the game with a tremendous volley. But Stan was also neat around his feet and constructive although, by his very nature, he could frighten a winger to death." Former teammate Graham Barnett later recalled how Turner and fellow defender Reg Potts did not get along and refused to speak to each other despite playing alongside each other for eight years. Barnet also described Turner as having a 'take-no-prisoners' approach to dealing with opposition wingers.

== Personal life ==
Turner was married and had a son named Stanley and a daughter named Elaine.

== Career statistics ==
Appearances and goals by club, season and competition
Club	Season	League			FA Cup		Total	
Club	Season	Division	Apps	Goals	Apps	Goals	Apps	Goals
Port Vale	1950–51	Third Division South	6	0	1	0	7	0
Port Vale	1951–52	Third Division South	40	0	0	0	40	0
Port Vale	1952–53	Third Division North	43	0	2	0	45	0
Port Vale	1953–54	Third Division North	43	0	8	0	51	0
Port Vale	1954–55	Second Division	42	0	3	0	45	0
Port Vale	1955–56	Second Division	26	0	2	0	28	0
Port Vale	1956–57	Second Division	27	0	2	0	29	0
Port Vale	Total		227	0	18	0	245	0

== Honours ==
Port Vale

- Football League Third Division North: 1953–54
