= 1951–52 Bradford City A.F.C. season =

Bradford City A.F.C.
1951–52 season
- Ground: Valley Parade
- Third Division North: 15th
- FA Cup: Second round

The 1951–52 Bradford City A.F.C. season was the 39th in the club's history.

The club finished 15th in Division Three North, and reached the 2nd round of the FA Cup.

== Sources ==
- Frost, Terry (1988). Bradford City A Complete Record 1903-1988. Breedon Books Sport. ISBN 0-907969-38-0.
