= Stoke-on-Trent built-up area =

Coordinates: 53.02°N 2.20°W

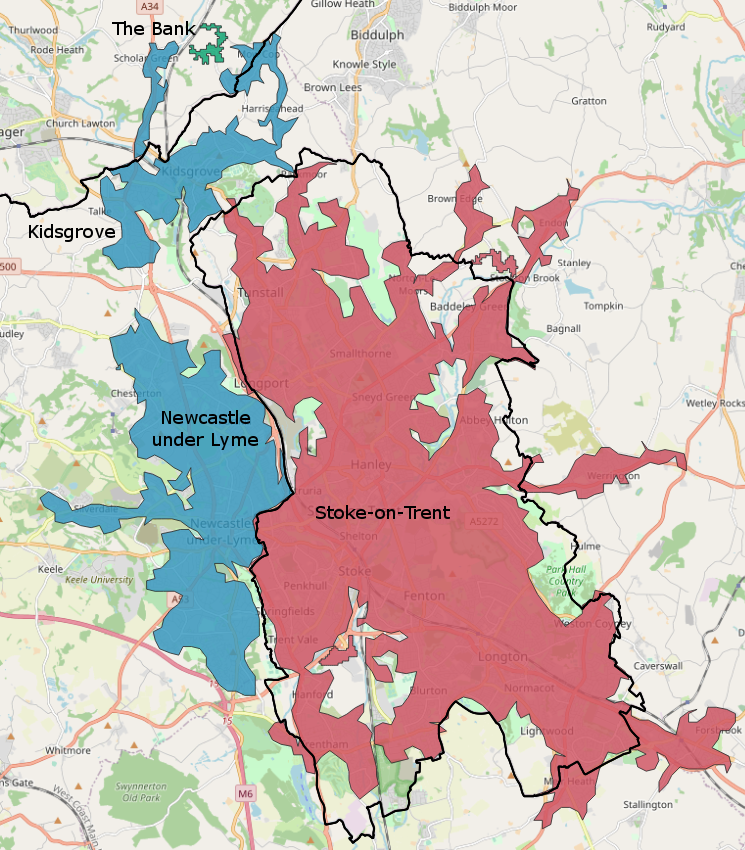
Map of the Stoke-on-Trent Built-up Area including subdivisions and local authority boundaries

The Stoke-on-Trent Built-up Area or The Potteries Urban Area or colloquially, simply "The Potteries" is a conurbation in north Staffordshire in the West Midlands region of England.

It includes the City of Stoke-on-Trent, and parts of the boroughs of Newcastle-under-Lyme and Staffordshire Moorlands.

The area had a population of 384,000 in 2019, a small increase from the 2001 census figure of 362,403 with Stoke-on-Trent making up over 70% of this population. It is sometimes called The Potteries Urban Area due to the area's fame and economic importance for the manufacture of Staffordshire pottery, an important element in the Industrial Revolution, which remained a large industry until the 20th century.

Subdivision	Population (2011 census)
Stoke-on-Trent	270,726
Newcastle-under-Lyme	75,082
Kidsgrove	26,293

== See also ==
- Staffordshire Potteries
- Federation of Stoke-on-Trent
