= Radcliffe, Northumberland =

Village in Northumberland, England

Coordinates: 55.316°N 1.584°W

Radcliffe
- Location within Northumberland
- OS grid reference: NU265025
- Unitary authority: Northumberland
- Ceremonial county: Northumberland
- Region: North East
- Country: England
- Sovereign state: United Kingdom
- Post town: MORPETH
- Postcode district: NE65
- Dialling code: 01665
- Police: Northumbria
- Fire: Northumberland
- Ambulance: North East
- UK Parliament: Berwick-upon-Tweed

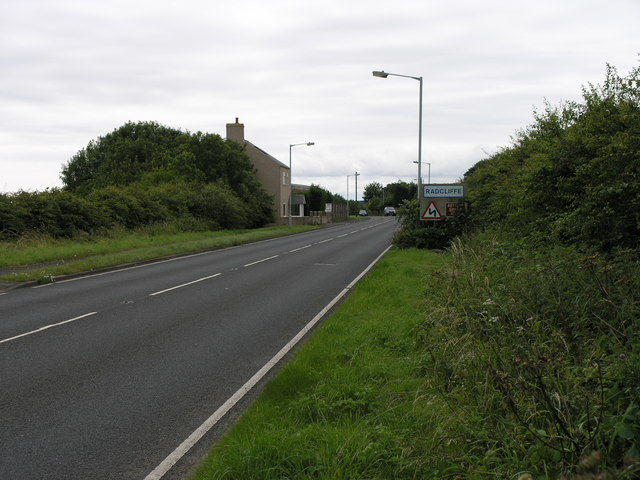

Radcliffe is a settlement in the county of Northumberland, England. It is located 1 km south of the town of Amble. The population is approximately 15 people.

== History ==
Radcliffe was originally a mining community, once home to over 700 people. A colliery operated there until 1892, when a fault in the seam, then fire and flooding, made coal extraction uneconomical. New pit shafts were sunk nearby at Newburgh and later at Hauxley, but flooding remained a problem.

Through much of the 19th and early to mid-20th century, the settlement was called "Radcliffe Terrace, Hauxley", giving the erroneous impression that it was part of Hauxley (or another local town); despite this, it was an independent (and somewhat isolated) settlement. The first word can be found spelled with many variations, even relatively recently: Ratliff, Radcliffe, Ratcliffe, Ratcliff, and Radcliff (and others).

By the mid-twentieth century, the surviving pits in this area were becoming uneconomical, especially when compared to extraction using opencast mining techniques. The last shift to work underground at Radcliffe was on 2 February 1962. In 1965 plans were drawn up to opencast mine the coal seam beneath Radcliffe and Newbrough.

The aging, and somewhat run-down, colliery-owned housing stock of the village was demolished in 1971 to enable opencast operations. The remaining inhabitants were relocated to Amble, onto Radcliffe estate. Various streets in this town, such as Dandsfield Square, an award-winning project when first built, are named after the demolished streets of Radcliffe.

As of 2009, nearby opencast mining continued, but not in Radcliffe; the land returned to agriculture, and to a nature reserve at Hauxley. Little is now visible at the site of the village – only a farm, a few private houses, a mechanic's workshop, and the old sports pavilion survived the demolition. The workshop was the site of Craiggs' Bus Garage, and re-opened as a repair workshop specialising in agricultural machinery. The house opposite was the home of Charlie Nyberg, who ran a newsagency and barbershop there. This house, built circa 1960, replaced the previous house and Post Office, demolished for road widening.

At the nature reserve, the footings of some features (paths, picnic area, etc.) are partially made with bricks, some of which show the imprint of Radcliffe (many collieries included a brickworks). Some newer homes were built along the A1068 Amble to Ashington road.

The Radcliffe War Memorial, erected in 1928 for the First World War, and with an additional roll of honour added for the fallen of the Second World War, was removed from Radcliffe and relocated to Amble, opposite the Amble Clock Tower Memorial in the Town Square. The original location can still be seen at the west side of the A1068 to the south of the village, where the surrounding wrought iron railings remain.

On 15 February 1942, a German aeroplane chased by an RAF fighter plane dropped a bomb dropped on Radcliffe. Three houses, a school, and a church were demolished. Three members of the Craiggs' extended family were killed and several others were injured. Casualties would have been much higher if the church service had not finished shortly before and the congregation dispersed.

== Governance ==
Radcliffe is in the parliamentary constituency of North Northumberland.
