= 1953–54 Port Vale F.C. season =

Port Vale F.C.
1953–54 season
- Chairman: Fred Burgess
- Manager: Freddie Steele
- Stadium: Vale Park
- Football League Third Division North: 1st (69 points)
- FA Cup: Semi-finals (eliminated by West Bromwich Albion)
- Top goalscorer: League: Basil Hayward (22); All: Basil Hayward (25)
- Highest home attendance: 42,000 vs. Blackpool, 20 February 1954
- Lowest home attendance: 9,367 vs. Accrington Stanley, 30 March 1954
- Average home league attendance: 16,653
- Biggest win: 7–0 vs. Stockport County, 10 April 1954
- Biggest defeat: 0–2 vs. Workington, 6 February 1954
Home colours	Away colours

The 1953–54 season was Port Vale's 42nd season of football in the English Football League, and their fifth season overall in the Third Division North. Freddie Steele's side were crowned Third Division North champions with 69 points out of a possible 92, eleven points ahead of their nearest rivals. They also reached the semi-finals of the FA Cup. They would be denied an appearance in the final due to a controversial goal from a dubious penalty. These achievements were based upon a record-breaking 'Iron Curtain' defence and a solid squad of 19 players, most of whom had taken the club to second place the previous season.

Seven still-standing club records were set this season, including three Football League records. One Football League record was for the fewest Football League goals conceded in a 46-match season – 26, just over one every two games. Just five of these were conceded at home, another Football League record. This was based upon 30 clean sheets, again a Football League record. They also recorded a club-record low of three league defeats and a club-record home clean sheet streak of eleven matches, lasting from 7 September 1953 to 13 February 1954. Another club record was a streak of six away draws, lasting from 20 March to 26 April. They were undefeated at home all season, continuing a 42-match unbeaten run started on 8 November 1952 that would last until 18 September 1954.

The key players that formed the first XI of 1953–54 were: Ray King (goalkeeper); Reg Potts and Stan Turner (full-backs); Tommy Cheadle, Albert Leake, Roy Sproson (half-backs); Colin Askey, John Cunliffe, Ken Griffiths, Basil Hayward, and Albert Mullard (forwards); Derek Tomkinson (reserve forward). Their achievements came as a team, without any outstanding stars, which caused The Sentinel to remark that the whole team were stars.

== Overview ==
=== Third Division North ===
The pre-season saw no new signings as the young, mostly local squad that had finished second in the 1952–53 campaign was enough for manager Freddie Steele. Steele signed a three-year contract following his success the previous season. He considered signing Stoke City goalkeeper Dennis Herod, and the two parties held talks before he was instead sold to Stockport County for £500. Alf Jones was given his first professional contract, whilst Selwyn Whalley (who was training to become teacher), Harry Oliver and John Poole (both engineering apprentices) all were given part-time professional contracts. Don Bould and Ron Fitzgerald returned from national service to become full-time professionals. This gave the club 21 full-time professionals, six part-time players and ten players aged 17–21 who could only play and train if they could find time off from their compulsory two-year national service. The strip was a traditional white shirt with black shorts, whilst the change kit of red and white stripes was donated by a friend of one of the club's directors, who was a Sunderland supporter.

There was only one public pre-season friendly on 13 August, which saw the club's first-team take on the reserves; it ended with a surprise 4–2 victory for the reserves, Roland Lewis scoring a hat-trick. Pre-season training consisted primarily of assistant manager Ken Fish leading a marathon running session from Burslem to Hanley and back to Burslem following a stop at a pub for a half-pint of shandy. After returning to the ground, Fish would organise a practice game. The fitness work was crucial to the team's success, as Steele was ahead of his time in that he insisted that wide players should defend when the opposition was on the ball to support the defence. Superstition was of great importance to Steele, who ensured that the team rigidly stuck their pre-match rituals such as the intricacies of kit layout and the order in which players entered the pitch.

The season began with a 2–1 win over Mansfield Town at Field Mill on 19 August; Chris Marron put Mansfield ahead on 52 minutes before Roy Sproson scored the equaliser on 69 minutes, Basil Hayward scored the winning goal three minutes later after being the first to react to the rebound that came when Colin Askey's shot hit the crossbar. The main surprise in the line-up of the opening day was that goalkeeper Ray Hancock had been dropped in favour of Ray King after King impressed in the pre-season friendly, the club's positive season meant that Hancock was unable to win back his place in the side. Vale were then held to two consecutive goalless draws but remained unbeaten in their first seven league games, conceding just two goals. This run included a 3–0 win over Darlington at Feethams and a 4–0 win over Barrow in which Hayward scored a hat-trick. They had risen to the top of the table by the third game of the season and remained in first place until the end of the season. Of the Barrow first eleven that day, three of the players were brothers: Jack, Alan and Bert Keen.

Vale lost by a single goal at Redheugh Park against Gateshead on 12 September; Vale, playing in their change kit, were beaten by a 57th-minute goal from John Ingham. This brought to an end the club's then-record streak of 16 games unbeaten. Four days later, Vale recorded a 2–1 win over Bradford (Park Avenue) at Park Avenue despite Reg Potts being injured with a swollen ankle early in the match. A 2–0 home win over Workington on 19 September began a sequence of five clean sheets, with Jim Elsby standing in for Potts as Steele changed the starting line-up for the first time in eight games – this brought Potts' run of 73 consecutive appearances to an end. The defensive fivesome of keeper Ray King, Tommy Cheadle, Reg Potts, Stan Turner and Roy Sproson began to be known as 'the Iron Curtain' or 'the Steele Curtain' (a play on the manager's name). A 21 September game against nearby unbeaten Crewe Alexandra was billed as a 'crunch clash' between first and second, and a Sproson goal on 87 minutes won the match for the Vale. For the return a week later, a stadium record 17,883 packed into Gresty Road to witness a goalless draw at Crewe. The attendance figures were helped by the management team of the Crewe Works, who allowed their workforce to leave work an hour early to make it for the 5:10 pm kick-off. The draw was achieved despite injuries to Albert Leake, Hayward and John Cunliffe, who were replaced by Derek Tomkinson, Roland Lewis and Mick Hulligan.

On 3 October, Vale secured the biggest-ever win at Vale Park when they beat York City 5–0. Seven days later Vale's clean sheet streak came to an end, though they still secured a 2–1 victory over Chesterfield at Saltergate; Cyril Hatton was the scorer for Chesterfield, though it proved not enough to save his team's unbeaten home record. Albert Mullard had a penalty kick saved towards the end of the game by goalkeeper Ron Powell, the only one of two penalties the club were awarded throughout the campaign. Vale then beat Tranmere Rovers 2–0 after their defence successfully contained the threat posed by the division's then-top scorer Cyril Done. The following week they won 1–0 at Halifax Town in a game where Ken Griffiths hit the woodwork three times.

On 7 November, Vale conceded twice in one game for the first time in the season, as Peel Park saw their Accrington Stanley side achieve a 2–2 draw with the Vale. Vale lost a two-goal lead in the match, as Ian Brydon scored after the ball got stuck in the mud and then Les Cocker scored the equalising goal after Ray King failed to hold on to a shot. By this time, Vale were building a significant point advantage over the rest of the league. On 28 November, Ken Griffiths scored a hat-trick as Vale 'tore apart' a poor Rochdale side 6–0, exceeding the record Vale Park win that had been set only two months earlier.

Steele was investigated by a joint FA/Football League inquiry for his time as Mansfield Town manager regarding suspected illegal payments – found guilty, he was given a £250 fine. The good run of results continued, though, as they beat fifth-placed Barnsley 1–0 at Oakwell through a Hayward goal. On Christmas Day and Boxing Day, Vale recorded two 1–0 wins over Chester, with Hayward again the only player to find the net. Captain Tommy Cheadle pulled a hamstring against Chester and lost his place in the team as Steele moved the positions around to accommodate Derek Tomkinson in the team. Roland Lewis was made available on a free transfer in December and moved to non-League side Witton Albion.

The club were granted a licence to build a stand on the Railway Terrace for £25,000. Vale struggled in the league in early 1954, losing 2–1 to Hartlepools United in a fierce wind at Victoria Park. Cheadle was again absent through injury, as two goals from Tommy McGuigan ended Vale's record run of 21 games unbeaten. Title rivals Gateshead then left Vale Park with a point after a goalless draw, ending the club's record run of 12 consecutive home victories.

A shock came on 6 February, when Bill Shankly's Workington earned a 2–0 win at Borough Park – the only time in the season Vale lost by more than one goal. Seven days later Scunthorpe & Lindsey United left Vale Park with a point as the home side came close to finding the net on numerous occasions without success despite one shot from Hayward partially injuring goalkeeper Norman Malan after he struck the ball hard into Malan's jaw. Following this short run of poor form they next recorded a win against York City, securing a 1–0 victory at Bootham Crescent. On 27 February, Chesterfield became the first away side to score at Vale Park since September, as they fought back from a two-goal deficit to win a point. Vale had previously conceded just one goal in 20 home games over 11 months and had last conceded twice in a home league game on 30 August 1952.

On 6 March, Tranmere Rovers striker Bill Bainbridge put his side ahead at Prenton Park, but the Vale equalised within two minutes and went on to win the game 3–1. They beat Halifax 2–0 the following week, with both goals coming in the last 14 minutes of the game. The trip to face Carlisle United at Brunton Park five days later saw six players sit out with injuries, leaving Hancock, Tomkinson, Len Barber, Elsby, Hulligan and Alan Bennett all to make rare appearances; Ken Fish also took charge of the team as Freddie Steele was watching FA Cup opponents West Bromwich Albion. The game finished goalless, with both Hancock and "Cumbrians" goalkeeper Jimmy McLaren receiving praise for several excellent saves. Vale ended the month with a 1–0 victory over Accrington Stanley despite Barber missing the second and last penalty the club would be awarded in the season.

Despite playing twelve games in thirty days throughout April, they remained unbeaten. On 10 April, they thrashed Stockport County 7–0 in a ground record victory, with Hayward scoring a hat-trick – they were 6–0 up after 36 minutes but then proceeded to play at 'a pleasant trot'. The championship title was secured on 17 April at Spotland with a goalless draw with Rochdale. They conceded just two goals in their final seven league games.

Vale finished top of the table with 69 points, eleven clear of second-placed Barnsley. Their 26 league goals conceded in a 46 games was a record. Just five of these were conceded at home, another Football League record. This was based upon 30 clean sheets, again a Football League record, although it was matched by Burnley in 2024–25. Ray King kept 29 of these clean sheets, a record only equalled by Gillingham goalkeeper Jim Stannard in 1995–96 and by Burnley's James Trafford in 2024–25. Vale's tally of just three league defeats was a club record. They were undefeated at home all season, continuing a 42-match unbeaten run started on 8 November 1952 that would last until 18 September 1954. Their achievements were built on a settled squad of 19 players, twelve of whom played regularly. They were the first team to play 54 competitive games in a single season.

=== Finances ===
On the financial side, a new profit of £2,628 was recorded despite the only transfer activity being a £350 credit. Gate receipts had risen by more than £11,000 to £50,940 thanks to a then club record average attendance of 16,702. No first-team players departed in the summer of 1954 due to the club's "no buy, no sell" policy. At the end of the season, only four players were released: William Cook, F.Viggars, Alf Jones and Lovatt, whilst A.Wharton was made available on a free transfer. None of these five players would play a game in the Football League. In July 1954, the new stand at Vale Park was completed, providing cover for 4,500 seated and 12,000 standing spectators. The club charged £2.50 for season tickets to the 42,000 (1,010 seated) capacity stadium.

On 29 March 1954, the Vale team played an "All-Star XI" in order to raise money for former Port Vale playing staff who had given long service to the club. The All-Star team was as follows: Frank Swift, Bert Sproston, Andy Beattie, Bill Corkhill, Les McDowall, Joe Mercer, Sammy Crooks, Raich Carter, Freddie Steele, Tim Ward and Peter Doherty; the All-Stars won 2–1 with both goals coming from Steele, making the club's manager the first player to score two goals against the Vale in one match that season.

=== FA Cup ===
In the FA Cup, a 3–1 win at Feethams took the Vale past league rivals Darlington in the first round. Les Robson had put the "Quakers" ahead by half-time after Ray King miss-kicked a clearance, but the Vale controlled the game as soon as Albert Leake scored the equaliser.

In the second round Vale drew another league rival in Southport, who battled to a 1–1 draw at Haig Avenue on 12 December, Harry Whitworth's header cancelling out Basil Hayward's opener. The Vale players later admitted they were fortunate to come away with a draw, especially seen as Colin Askey and Albert Leake spent much of the game limping. Two days later Vale recorded a 2–0 win in the replay in what was a tough game.

In the third round, Queens Park Rangers of the Third Division South were beaten 1–0 at Loftus Road. The pitch was muddy and the weather was pouring rain in a game that was inevitably poor in quality, settled in the 50th minute by Albert Leake following a long ball played by John Cunliffe.

The fourth round held First Division club Cardiff City in snowy conditions at Ninian Park. Vale won 2–0, and their victory was aided by the fact that Cardiff goalkeeper Ron Howells had to leave the pitch after 20 minutes after being knocked out following a collision with defender Derrick Sullivan, leaving his ten-man team to play 70 minutes with defender Alf Sherwood in goal. Vale attacked through the wings to get in numerous crosses to the box, from which Ken Griffiths and Albert Leake scored their goals. Centre-half Tommy Cheadle restricted centre-forward Trevor Ford to a quiet game, and at full-time the pair were full of bruises but still left the pitch with a handshake and a smile. Cardiff placed a £25,000 transfer bid for winger Colin Askey, and after their offer was rejected, Cardiff stated they were prepared to pay more than £25,000, but Port Vale refused any negotiations. Other top clubs also made inquiries, but were all turned away.

In the fifth round, the "Valiants" faced holders Blackpool, and 42,000 tickets were sold for the clash at Vale Park. The victors of the 'Matthews final' brought Stanley Matthews and six other internationals to Vale Park, as well a travelling contingent of 10,500. Albert Leake scored two goals on the waterlogged pitch, as his team put 'a dazzling display in attack and defence' and their 'hard-fighting, quick-on-the-ball play smothered Blackpool's intricate approach work'.

In the sixth round, they faced Third Division South club Leyton Orient at Brisbane Road, as 8,000 Vale fans made up a 31,000 crowd. In the days leading up to the game, thieves had stolen 1,200 matchday tickets, and police were vigilant to catch anyone who tried to enter the stadium with these stolen tickets. The team, meanwhile, were invited to meet comedian and actor Arthur Askey at the Palace Theatre, London. The only goal of the game came from Leake – who struck the ball into the net after controlling the ball from a Hayward knock-down from an Askey corner – put Vale into the semi-finals, with the team 'delightedly mobbed' by supporters after the finish. Ray King made a name for himself in the dying moments of the game after making a save from a George Poulton shot.

The 25,000 tickets Vale were allotted for the semi-final clash with West Bromwich Albion at Villa Park sold out on the first day. In all 100 coaches and 14 excursion trains took the supporters to Birmingham for the match on 27 March, at which time high-scoring West Brom were top of the First Division – in all 68,221 spectators packed into the stadium. This meant the match secured the club a total of £20,086 in gate receipts. Ken Griffiths was unable to recover from a knee injury in time for the match and so was replaced by Derek Tomkinson, this was the first and only change to the first eleven throughout the cup run. In the match itself, Albion's 'constructive play' was halted by the Vale defence, and a Leake goal on 40 minutes saw Vale 1–0 up at half-time. The second half saw the "Throstles" switch to a long ball game, and on 62 minutes Cheadle was bustled off the ball and could only watch the equaliser cross the line. Eight minutes later captain Cheadle was judged to have fouled George Lee just inside the penalty box, though the Port Vale players maintained that the challenge took place well outside of the box, and that Lee also handled the ball. Former "Valiant" star Ronnie Allen converted the resulting penalty. Later in the match Leake had an equalising goal disallowed for offside, and Vale therefore failed to be the first third-tier club to reach an FA Cup final.

"West Brom were top of the First Division at the time, but we were playing out of our skins and we should have gone through. We were devastated after the game. I guess it was just fate, it wasn't meant to be – but that doesn't make it any easier to take. They score two dodgy goals and we should have been going to Wembley. Their first goal was a fluke of an own goal which came off the back of Tommy Cheadle's head. Poor Tommy was as deaf as a door post and I was shouting at him to leave it, but he didn't hear me and he slipped and put it in the net ... Also, the penalty was never a penalty; the foul was easily outside the box. Looking at the television replays of the incident, even in grainy black and white, you can see that is obvious. Ronnie Allen, who used to play for Vale, took the penalty. He used to practise them against me in those days, so I knew exactly where was going to hit it, and he knew that I knew. When he stepped up, though, he hammered it right into the corner. I got my fingertips to it, but it was hit too hard and flew into the net – and that was that, we were out."

— Ray King believed that Vale deserved to go through.

== Results ==
=== Third Division North ===
==== League table ====
Pos	Team	Pld	W	D	L	GF	GA	GAv	Pts	Promotion or relegation
1	Port Vale (C, P)	46	26	17	3	74	21	3.524	69	Promotion to the Second Division
2	Barnsley	46	24	10	12	77	57	1.351	58	
3	Scunthorpe & Lindsey United	46	21	15	10	77	56	1.375	57	
4	Gateshead	46	21	13	12	74	55	1.345	55	
5	Bradford City	46	22	9	15	60	55	1.091	53	

Source: rsssf.com
(C) Division Champions; (P) Promoted

==== Results by matchday ====
Round	1	2	3	4	5	6	7	8	9	10	11	12	13	14	15	16	17	18	19	20	21	22	23	24	25	26	27	28	29	30	31	32	33	34	35	36	37	38	39	40	41	42	43	44	45	46
Ground	A	H	A	A	H	H	H	A	A	H	H	A	A	H	A	H	A	H	A	H	H	A	A	H	A	A	H	A	H	A	H	A	H	A	H	H	A	H	A	H	H	A	A	H	A	H
Result	W	D	D	W	W	W	W	L	W	W	W	W	D	W	W	W	W	W	D	W	W	D	W	W	W	L	D	L	D	W	D	W	W	D	W	W	D	D	D	W	D	D	D	W	D	D
Position	3	2	1	1	1	1	1	1	1	1	1	1	1	1	1	1	1	1	1	1	1	1	1	1	1	1	1	1	1	1	1	1	1	1	1	1	1	1	1	1	1	1	1	1	1	1
Points	2	3	4	6	8	10	12	12	14	16	18	20	21	23	25	27	29	31	32	34	36	37	39	41	43	43	44	44	45	47	48	50	52	53	55	57	58	59	60	62	63	64	65	67	68	69

Source: Statto
A = Away; H = Home; W = Win; D = Draw; L = Loss

==== Matches ====
19 August 1953 1	Mansfield Town	1–2	Port Vale	Mansfield
	Marron	Report	Sproson; Hayward	Stadium: Field Mill; Attendance: 10,410

22 August 1953 2	Port Vale	0–0	Barnsley	Burslem
		Report		Stadium: Vale Park; Attendance: 14,223

24 August 1953 3	Barrow	0–0	Port Vale	Barrow-in-Furness
		Report		Stadium: Holker Street; Attendance: 7,783

29 August 1953 4	Darlington	0–3	Port Vale	Darlington
		Report	Griffiths; Hayward	Stadium: Feethams; Attendance: 6,278

31 August 1953 5	Port Vale	4–0	Barrow	Burslem
	Hayward; Griffiths	Report		Stadium: Vale Park; Attendance: 13,403

5 September 1953 6	Port Vale	3–1	Hartlepools United	Burslem
	Hayward; Griffiths	Report	Burnett	Stadium: Vale Park; Attendance: 20,052; Referee: Tom Seymour

7 September 1953 7	Port Vale	2–0	Bradford (Park Avenue)	Burslem
	Leake	Report		Stadium: Vale Park; Attendance: 19,270

12 September 1953 8	Gateshead	1–0	Port Vale	Gateshead
		Report		Stadium: Redheugh Park; Attendance: 11,382

16 September 1953 9	Bradford (Park Avenue)	1–2	Port Vale	Bradford
		Report	Mullard; Griffiths	Stadium: Park Avenue; Attendance: 10,960

19 September 1953 10	Port Vale	2–0	Workington	Burslem
	Griffiths; Leake	Report		Stadium: Vale Park; Attendance: 16,627

21 September 1953 11	Port Vale	1–0	Crewe Alexandra	Burslem
	Sproson	Report		Stadium: Vale Park; Attendance: 17,482

26 September 1953 12	Scunthorpe & Lindsey United	0–2	Port Vale	Scunthorpe
		Report	Hayward; Leake	Stadium: Old Show Ground; Attendance: 12,630

28 September 1953 13	Crewe Alexandra	0–0	Port Vale	Crewe
		Report		Stadium: Gresty Road; Attendance: 17,883

3 October 1953 14	Port Vale	5–0	York City	Burslem
	Hayward; Cunliffe; Griffiths; Tomkinson	Report		Stadium: Vale Park; Attendance: 18,778

10 October 1953 15	Chesterfield	1–2	Port Vale	Chesterfield, Derbyshire
		Report	Askey; Griffiths	Stadium: Saltergate; Attendance: 15,806

17 October 1953 16	Port Vale	2–0	Tranmere Rovers	Burslem
	Leake; Hayward	Report		Stadium: Vale Park; Attendance: 19,204

24 October 1953 17	Halifax Town	0–1	Port Vale	Halifax, West Yorkshire
		Report	Leake	Stadium: The Shay; Attendance: 10,361

31 October 1953 18	Port Vale	1–0	Carlisle United	Burslem
	Leake	Report		Stadium: Vale Park; Attendance: 12,454

7 November 1953 19	Accrington Stanley	2–2	Port Vale	Accrington
		Report	Cunliffe; Griffiths	Stadium: Peel Park; Attendance: 7,895

14 November 1953 20	Port Vale	2–0	Grimsby Town	Burslem
	Leake	Report		Stadium: Vale Park; Attendance: 14,799

28 November 1953 21	Port Vale	6–0	Rochdale	Burslem
	Griffiths; Leake; Hayward	Report		Stadium: Vale Park; Attendance: 16,841

5 December 1953 22	Wrexham	1–1	Port Vale	Wrexham
14:30 GMT	Hughes 20'	Report	Hayward 65'	Stadium: Racecourse Ground; Attendance: 14,570; Referee: C. Holland

19 December 1953 23	Barnsley	0–1	Port Vale	Barnsley
		Report	Hayward	Stadium: Oakwell; Attendance: 11,426

25 December 1953 24	Port Vale	1–0	Chester	Burslem
	Hayward	Report		Stadium: Vale Park; Attendance: 15,322

26 December 1953 25	Chester	0–1	Port Vale	Chester
		Report	Hayward	Stadium: Sealand Road; Attendance: 10,979

16 January 1954 26	Hartlepools United	2–1	Port Vale	Hartlepool
	McGuigan	Report	Griffiths	Stadium: Victoria Park; Attendance: 8,554; Referee: Tom Seymour

23 January 1954 27	Port Vale	0–0	Gateshead	Burslem
		Report		Stadium: Vale Park; Attendance: 20,370

6 February 1954 28	Workington	2–0	Port Vale	Workington
		Report		Stadium: Borough Park; Attendance: 13,714

13 February 1954 29	Port Vale	0–0	Scunthorpe & Lindsey United	Burslem
		Report		Stadium: Vale Park; Attendance: 17,240

24 February 1954 30	York City	0–1	Port Vale	York
		Report	Hayward	Stadium: Bootham Crescent; Attendance: 7,131

27 February 1954 31	Port Vale	2–2	Chesterfield	Burslem
	Griffiths; Cunliffe	Report		Stadium: Vale Park; Attendance: 19,886

6 March 1954 32	Tranmere Rovers	1–3	Port Vale	Prenton
		Report	Hayward; Griffiths	Stadium: Prenton Park; Attendance: 9,946

15 March 1954 33	Port Vale	2–0	Halifax Town	Burslem
	Askey; Leake	Report		Stadium: Vale Park; Attendance: 10,533

20 March 1954 34	Carlisle United	0–0	Port Vale	Carlisle
		Report		Stadium: Brunton Park; Attendance: 9,995

30 March 1954 35	Port Vale	1–0	Accrington Stanley	Burslem
	Cunliffe	Report		Stadium: Vale Park; Attendance: 9,367

1 April 1954 36	Port Vale	3–0	Bradford City	Burslem
	Tomkinson; Barber	Report		Stadium: Vale Park; Attendance: 18,418

3 April 1954 37	Grimsby Town	2–2	Port Vale	Cleethorpes
		Report	Leake; Cunliffe	Stadium: Blundell Park; Attendance: 9,952

5 April 1954 38	Port Vale	1–1	Mansfield Town	Burslem
	Barber	Report	Daley	Stadium: Vale Park; Attendance: 13,060

7 April 1954 39	Bradford City	1–1	Port Vale	Bradford
		Report	Askey	Stadium: Valley Parade; Attendance: 15,240

10 April 1954 40	Port Vale	7–0	Stockport County	Burslem
	Hayward; Askey; Cunliffe; Tomkinson	Report		Stadium: Vale Park; Attendance: 19,513; Referee: Jack Sherlock

16 April 1954 41	Port Vale	0–0	Southport	Burslem
		Report		Stadium: Vale Park; Attendance: 26,941

17 April 1954 42	Rochdale	0–0	Port Vale	Rochdale
		Report		Stadium: Spotland Stadium; Attendance: 14,749

19 April 1954 43	Southport	0–0	Port Vale	Southport
		Report		Stadium: Haig Avenue; Attendance: 12,328

24 April 1954 44	Port Vale	2–0	Wrexham	Burslem
15:15 BST	Griffiths 55'; Cunliffe 74'	Report		Stadium: Vale Park; Attendance: 18,174; Referee: C. Holland

26 April 1954 45	Stockport County	1–1	Port Vale	Stockport
16:45 BST	Weigh	Report	Cunliffe	Stadium: Edgeley Park; Attendance: 11,840; Referee: Jack Sherlock

29 April 1954 46	Port Vale	1–1	Darlington	Burslem
	Tomkinson	Report		Stadium: Vale Park; Attendance: 11,502

=== FA Cup ===
21 November 1953 R1	Darlington	1–3	Port Vale	Darlington
		Report	Leake; Hayward; Cunliffe	Stadium: Feethams; Attendance: 10,700

12 December 1953 R2	Southport	1–1	Port Vale	Southport
		Report	Hayward	Stadium: Haig Avenue; Attendance: 12,529

14 December 1953 Replay	Port Vale	2–0	Southport	Burslem
	Askey; Hayward	Report		Stadium: Vale Park; Attendance: 13,024

9 January 1954 R3	Queens Park Rangers	0–1	Port Vale	Shepherd's Bush, West London
		Report	Leake	Stadium: Loftus Road; Attendance: 17,474

30 January 1954 R4	Cardiff City	0–2	Port Vale	Cardiff
		Report	Griffiths; Leake	Stadium: Ninian Park; Attendance: 27,295

20 February 1954 R5	Port Vale	2–0	Blackpool	Burslem
	Leake	Report		Stadium: Vale Park; Attendance: 42,000

13 March 1954 R6	Leyton Orient	0–1	Port Vale	Leyton, East London
		Report	Leake	Stadium: Brisbane Road; Attendance: 31,000

27 March 1954 Semi-final	West Bromwich Albion	2–1	Port Vale	Birmingham
	Griffin 62'; Allen (pen) 70'	Report	Leake 40'	Stadium: Villa Park; Attendance: 68,221

== Squad statistics ==
=== Appearances and goals ===
Key to positions: GK – Goalkeeper; FB – Full back; HB – Half back; FW – Forward

No.	Pos	Nat	Player	Total		Third Division North		FA Cup	
No.	Pos	Nat	Player	Apps	Goals	Apps	Goals	Apps	Goals
	GK	(England) ENG	Ray Hancock	1	0	1	0	0	0
	GK	(England) ENG	Ray King	53	0	45	0	8	0
	GK	(England) ENG	John Poole	0	0	0	0	0	0
	FB	(England) ENG	Don Bould	0	0	0	0	0	0
	FB	(England) ENG	William Cook	0	0	0	0	0	0
	FB	(England) ENG	Jim Elsby	7	0	7	0	0	0
	FB	(England) ENG	Harry Oliver	0	0	0	0	0	0
	FB	(England) ENG	Reg Potts	50	0	42	0	8	0
	FB	(England) ENG	Stan Turner	51	0	43	0	8	0
	FB	(England) ENG	F.Viggars	0	0	0	0	0	0
	HB	(England) ENG	Roy Brien	1	0	1	0	0	0
	HB	(England) ENG	Tommy Cheadle	46	0	38	0	8	0
	HB	(England) ENG	Ron Fitzgerald	0	0	0	0	0	0
	HB	(England) ENG	Alf Jones	0	0	0	0	0	0
	HB	(England) ENG	Albert Leake	48	20	40	13	8	7
	HB	(England) ENG	Derek Mountford	0	0	0	0	0	0
	HB	(England) ENG	N.Rowe	0	0	0	0	0	0
	HB	(England) ENG	Roy Sproson	53	2	45	2	8	0
	HB	(England) ENG	A.Wharton	0	0	0	0	0	0
	HB	(England) ENG	Pat Willdigg	0	0	0	0	0	0
	HB	(England) ENG	Frank Wintle	0	0	0	0	0	0
	HB	(England) ENG	K.Worrall	0	0	0	0	0	0
	FW	(England) ENG	Colin Askey	53	6	45	5	8	1
	FW	(England) ENG	Len Barber	8	2	8	2	0	0
	FW	(England) ENG	Alan Bennett	5	0	5	0	0	0
	FW	(England) ENG	R.Bradshaw	0	0	0	0	0	0
	FW	(England) ENG	George Burrows	0	0	0	0	0	0
	FW	(England) ENG	Thomas Conway	0	0	0	0	0	0
	FW	(England) ENG	John Cunliffe	50	9	42	8	8	1
	FW	(England) ENG	Ken Griffiths	43	17	36	16	7	1
	FW	(England) ENG	Basil Hayward	45	25	37	22	8	3
	FW	(England) ENG	Mick Hulligan	5	0	5	0	0	0
	FW	(England) ENG	Albert Mullard	54	1	46	1	8	0
	FW	(England) ENG	Stan Smith	0	0	0	0	0	0
	FW	(England) ENG	Derek Tomkinson	20	5	19	5	1	0
	FW	(England) ENG	Selwyn Whalley	0	0	0	0	0	0
Players who featured but departed the club during the season:
	FW	(England) ENG	Roland Lewis	1	0	1	0	0	0

=== Top scorers ===
Place	Position	Nation	Name	Third Division North	FA Cup	Total
1	FW	England	Basil Hayward	22	3	25
2	HB	England	Albert Leake	13	7	20
3	FW	England	Ken Griffiths	16	1	17
4	FW	England	John Cunliffe	8	1	9
5	FW	England	Colin Askey	5	1	6
6	FW	England	Derek Tomkinson	5	0	5
7	HB	England	Roy Sproson	2	0	2
–	FW	England	Len Barber	2	0	2
9	FW	England	Albert Mullard	1	0	1
			TOTALS	74	13	87

== Transfers ==
=== Transfers out ===
Date from	Position	Nationality	Name	To	Fee	Ref.
December 1953	FW	ENG	Roland Lewis		Released	
