= Michael Moran =

Michael Moran may refer to:

== Sport ==
- Michael Moran (golfer) (1886–1918), Irish golfer
- Michael Moran (gymnast) (born 1976), American gymnast
- Michael Moran (rugby league) (born 1983), Australian rugby league player
- Mickey Moran, Gaelic footballer and manager
- Mike Moran (footballer) (1935–1964), English football player

== Politicians ==
- Michael Moran (Massachusetts politician), Democratic member of the Massachusetts House of Representatives
- Mícheál Ó Móráin (1912–1983), Irish Fianna Fáil politician from County Mayo
- Mike Moran (politician), former Democratic member of the Ohio House of Representatives

== Others ==
- Michael Moran (journalist) (born 1962), new media journalist and broadcaster, editor of CFR.org
- Michael Moran (music producer) (born 1948), English keyboard musician and producer
- Michael Moran (Tuam) (1893–1920), shot dead while in the custody of the Royal Irish Constabulary
- Michael Moran (writer), Australian travel writer
- Michael J. Moran (c. 1794–1846), popularly known as Zozimus, Irish street rhymer
- Michael P. Moran (1944–2004), American actor and playwright
- Michael T. Moran, United States Navy admiral
- Mike Moran (wrestler), American professional wrestler

== See also ==
- Micky Moran, the human alter ego of Marvelman
- Mickey Moran, a character in the film Babes in Arms
