= Derek Tomkinson =

English footballer (1931–2021)

Personal information
- Full name: Derek Tomkinson
- Date of birth: 6 April 1931
- Place of birth: Stoke-on-Trent, England
- Date of death: 28 July 2021 (aged 90)
- Height: 5 ft 9 in (1.75 m)
- Position: Inside forward

Senior career*
Years	Team	Apps	(Gls)
1949–1951	Port Vale	0	(0)
1951–1952	Burton Albion		
1952–1955	Port Vale	29	(5)
1955–1957	Crewe Alexandra	17	(1)
1958–1961	Macclesfield Town	99	(2)
1961–1962	Altrincham		
Total		145+	(8+)
- * Club domestic league appearances and goals

Derek Tomkinson (6 April 1931 – 28 July 2021) was an English professional footballer who played as an inside forward for Burton Albion, Port Vale, Crewe Alexandra, and Macclesfield Town. He helped the "Valiants" to win the Third Division North title in the 1953–54 season. He also won the Cheshire Senior Cup with Macclesfield Town in 1960.

== Career ==
Tomkinson joined Port Vale as an amateur in 1949 after his father took him to the Old Recreation Ground and asked staff, "could you give my boy a game?". He never played a first-team match and instead departed for Burton Albion in 1951. He returned to Port Vale in December 1952 to sign as a professional. He made his debut on Boxing Day 1951 in a 4–1 win over Crewe Alexandra at Gresty Road. He played five further Third Division North games in 1952–53, as the "Valiants" finished second in the league. Having forced his way into first-team contention by scoring a hat-trick for the reserve team against the first XI, he went on to score five goals in 20 games in the 1953–54 title-winning campaign. He played in the FA Cup semi-final defeat to West Bromwich Albion. He was primarily used as a reserve for Albert Leake, though took Ken Griffiths place in the semi-final after Griffiths failed a fitness test. He played four Second Division games in 1954–55, before leaving Vale Park for Crewe Alexandra.

The "Railwaymen" finished bottom of the Third Division North in 1955–56 and 1956–57 under the stewardship of Maurice Lindley. He then moved on to Cheshire County League side Macclesfield Town in 1958, appearing as a regular first-team player for three seasons and helping the "Silkmen" to win the Cheshire Senior Cup in 1960. He made 39 appearances for Altrincham during the 1961–62 season.

== Post-retirement ==
Tomkinson became a company secretary in the pottery industry and worked at Keele University before emigrating to Europe. He later returned to England and, in December 2013, was living in Cullompton, though he would go on to reside in a care home in Sidmouth.

== Career statistics ==
Appearances and goals by club, season and competition
Club	Season	League			FA Cup		Other		Total	
Club	Season	Division	Apps	Goals	Apps	Goals	Apps	Goals	Apps	Goals
Port Vale	1952–53	Third Division North	6	0	0	0	—		6	0
Port Vale	1953–54	Third Division North	19	5	1	0	—		20	5
Port Vale	1954–55	Second Division	4	0	0	0	—		4	0
Port Vale	Total		29	5	1	0	0	0	30	5
Crewe Alexandra	1956–57	Third Division North	17	1	2	0	—		19	1
Macclesfield Town	1958–59	Cheshire County League	23	0	1	0	1	0	25	0
Macclesfield Town	1959–60	Cheshire County League	35	2	1	0	8	1	44	3
Macclesfield Town	1960–61	Cheshire County League	41	0	5	0	2	0	48	0
Macclesfield Town	Total		99	2	7	0	11	0	117	0

== Honours ==
Port Vale

- Football League Third Division North: 1953–54

Macclesfield Town

- Cheshire Senior Cup: 1960
