= Jim Elsby =

English footballer

Personal information
- Full name: James Elsby
- Date of birth: 1 August 1928
- Place of birth: Newcastle-under-Lyme, England
- Date of death: 7 September 1987 (aged 59)
- Place of death: Newcastle-under-Lyme, England
- Position: Full-back

Senior career*
Years	Team	Apps	(Gls)
1948–1955	Port Vale	12	(0)
- Wereton Queen's Park
- * Club domestic league appearances and goals

James Elsby (1 August 1928 – 7 September 1987) was an English footballer. A full-back, he played 12 games in the Football League for Port Vale in a seven-year career at the club from 1948 to 1955. He helped the club to win the Third Division North title in 1953–54. His nephew, Ian Elsby, also played for Port Vale.

== Career ==
Elsby joined Port Vale as an amateur in November 1948 and signed as a professional in May 1949. He made his debut in a goalless draw with Crystal Palace at the Old Recreation Ground on 7 May 1949, as Bill McGarry was rested. This was his only appearance of the 1948–49 season. He played two Third Division South games in 1949–50. He also played twice in April 1953, as Stan Turner was rested, as manager Freddie Steele led the club to a second-place finish in the Third Division North in 1952–53. He filled in for seven games for Derek Tomkinson and Turner in 1953–54, as the "Valiants" finished the campaign as champions. He did not feature at Vale Park in the Second Division 1954–55 campaign, and moved on to Wereton Queen's Park.

== Career statistics ==
Appearances and goals by club, season and competition
Club	Season	League			FA Cup		Total	
Club	Season	Division	Apps	Goals	Apps	Goals	Apps	Goals
Port Vale	1948–49	Third Division South	1	0	0	0	1	0
Port Vale	1949–50	Third Division South	2	0	0	0	2	0
Port Vale	1950–51	Third Division South	0	0	0	0	0	0
Port Vale	1951–52	Third Division South	0	0	0	0	0	0
Port Vale	1952–53	Third Division North	2	0	0	0	2	0
Port Vale	1953–54	Third Division North	7	0	0	0	7	0
Port Vale	1954–55	Second Division	0	0	0	0	0	0
Port Vale	Total		12	0	0	0	12	0

== Honours ==
Port Vale

- Football League Third Division North: 1953–54
