= Frank Wintle =

English footballer

Personal information
- Full name: Frank James Wintle
- Date of birth: 20 December 1929
- Place of birth: Stoke-on-Trent, England
- Date of death: 4 January 2005 (aged 75)
- Place of death: Birmingham, England
- Position: Defender

Senior career*
Years	Team	Apps	(Gls)
1949–1957	Port Vale	1	(0)
1957–1958	Crewe Alexandra	0	(0)
1958	Macclefield Town	4	(0)
Total		5	(0)
- * Club domestic league appearances and goals

Frank James Wintle (20 December 1929 – 4 January 2005) was an English footballer who played as a defender. He was signed to Port Vale from 1949 to 1957 but only played one league game. He later joined Crewe Alexandra.

== Career ==
Wintle joined Port Vale in May 1949 but was never given a game by Gordon Hodgson, Ivor Powell, Freddie Steele, or Norman Low. The only time he featured in the first-team was a brief period between Steele's resignation and Low's appointment as manager. After eight years at the club, now aged 27, Wintle made his only appearance for the "Valiants" at right-back in a 7–1 thrashing by Nottingham Forest at Vale Park on 2 February 1957. Forest's outside-left Stewart Imlach gave Wintle a very difficult afternoon. At the end of the 1956–57 season Vale were relegated out of the Second Division. He was given a free transfer in May 1957 and moved on to Crewe Alexandra. He never made his debut for the "Railwaymen". He joined Macclefield Town but played just four games in the Cheshire County League. He worked as a fishmonger in Knutton throughout his playing career.

== Career statistics ==
Appearances and goals by club, season and competition
Club	Season	League			FA Cup		Total	
Club	Season	Division	Apps	Goals	Apps	Goals	Apps	Goals
Port Vale	1953–54	Third Division North	0	0	0	0	0	0
Port Vale	1954–55	Second Division	0	0	0	0	0	0
Port Vale	1955–56	Second Division	0	0	0	0	0	0
Port Vale	1956–57	Second Division	1	0	0	0	1	0
Port Vale	Total		1	0	0	0	1	0
Crewe Alexandra	1957–58	Third Division North	0	0	0	0	0	0
