= John Poole (footballer, born 1932) =

English footballer (1932–2020)

Personal information
- Full name: John Arthur Frederick Poole
- Date of birth: 12 December 1932
- Place of birth: Stoke-upon-Trent, England
- Date of death: 17 November 2020 (aged 87)
- Height: 5 ft 8 in (1.73 m)
- Position: Goalkeeper

Youth career
- Ashley
- Penkhull Youth Club
- Stoke City
- Port Vale

Senior career*
Years	Team	Apps	(Gls)
1953–1961	Port Vale	33	(0)
1961–1963	Macclesfield Town	79	(0)
1963	Werrington		
Total		112	(0)
- * Club domestic league appearances and goals

John Arthur Frederick Poole (12 December 1932 – 17 November 2020) was an English football goalkeeper who made 33 league appearances for Port Vale in the Football League between 1953 and 1961. He later played for non-League sides Macclesfield Town and Werrington.

== Career ==
John Poole was born in Stoke-on-Trent on 12 December 1932. After playing for numerous youth teams, including Ashley, Penkhull Youth Club, and Stoke City's youth team, Poole graduated through the Port Vale juniors to sign professional forms in September 1953. He did his national service with the Royal Electrical and Mechanical Engineers and served in Singapore, Hong Kong and Malaysia. Manager Freddie Steele handed him his debut on 28 April 1956, in a 3–2 win over Middlesbrough at Vale Park. Remaining as understudy to Ray King, he featured in three Second Division games in the 1956–57 relegation campaign. He played three Third Division South games in 1957–58, as new manager Norman Low recruited former Wales international Keith Jones as the "Valiants" new number one.

Poole did not play in the 1958–59 Fourth Division winning campaign but had a run of games in the 1959–60 season, including playing in front of a Vale Park record crowd of 49,768 in 2–1 defeat to Aston Villa in the FA Cup. He managed to earn the first-team goalkeeping spot off Ken Hancock in November 1959, but he lost this position after fracturing his nose in a 6–3 defeat at Mansfield Town on 25 April 1960 – the penultimate game of the season. Manager Norman Low informed Poole's wife with a brief phone call: "Hello, Mrs Poole, Norman Low here. John's in the hospital with a broken nose. The good news is he hasn't fractured his skull. Goodnight!" He played just three Third Division matches in 1960–61, as Hancock firmly established himself as the club's preferred goalkeeper. Poole left on a free transfer in May 1961, and later played for Macclesfield Town and Werrington. Poole retired from playing in 1963.

== Style of play ==
Poole was a goalkeeper with good anticipation and bravery. He played one game with a broken wrist.

== Personal life ==
Upon his retirement he became a keen Port Vale fan; he co-founded the club's Ex-Players Association with former teammate Ken Hancock. He worked as a motor mechanic. He married Pat, who was named as Miss Port Vale in 1954. He had two sons: Greg and Duncan; and two grandchildren: Reece Poole and Katie Poole. His uncle, Tom Davis, also played for Port Vale in the 1920s. Poole's death was announced by Port Vale on 19 November 2020.

== Career statistics ==
Appearances and goals by club, season and competition
Club	Season	League			FA Cup		Other		Total	
Club	Season	Division	Apps	Goals	Apps	Goals	Apps	Goals	Apps	Goals
Port Vale	1953–54	Third Division North	0	0	0	0	—		0	0
Port Vale	1954–55	Second Division	0	0	0	0	—		0	0
Port Vale	1955–56	Second Division	1	0	0	0	—		1	0
Port Vale	1956–57	Second Division	3	0	0	0	—		3	0
Port Vale	1957–58	Third Division South	3	0	0	0	—		3	0
Port Vale	1958–59	Fourth Division	0	0	0	0	—		0	0
Port Vale	1959–60	Third Division	23	0	5	0	—		28	0
Port Vale	1960–61	Third Division	3	0	0	0	—		3	0
Port Vale	Total		33	0	5	0	0	0	38	0
Macclesfield Town	1961–62	Cheshire County League	42	0	2	0	7	0	51	0
Macclesfield Town	1962–63	Cheshire County League	37	0	2	0	4	0	43	0
Macclesfield Town	Total		79	0	4	0	11	0	94	0
Total			112	0	9	0	11	0	132	0
