= Tommy Cheadle =

English footballer

Personal information
- Full name: Thomas Cheadle
- Date of birth: 8 April 1919
- Place of birth: Stoke-on-Trent, England
- Date of death: 4 September 1993 (aged 74)
- Place of death: Bucknall, Stoke-on-Trent, England
- Positions: Defender; forward

Senior career*
Years	Team	Apps	(Gls)
1946–1957	Port Vale	333	(14)
1957–1959	Crewe Alexandra	37	(0)
Total		370	(14)
- * Club domestic league appearances and goals

Thomas Cheadle (8 April 1919 – 4 September 1993) was an English footballer. He played for Port Vale in various positions for over a decade. It was his time as a "hard-man" centre-back, captaining some of the most successful Vale sides in the club's history, that made Cheadle a legend at the club. He helped the "Valiants" to win the Third Division North title and to reach the FA Cup semi-finals in 1953–54. He ended his career in 1959, following two years with Crewe Alexandra.

== Career ==
=== Port Vale ===
Born in Stoke-on-Trent, Cheadle worked at Mossfield Colliery and in the local pottery industry before he joined the army. North Staffordshire Regiment Physical Training Instructor Matt Busby converted him from left-back to centre-half. During World War II, in a battlefield in the Netherlands in 1944, he received a shrapnel injury after throwing a faulty grenade that nearly went off in his hand. At a rehabilitation centre, Cheadle spoke to Vale trainer Ken Fish, who told him to report to Port Vale after the war as the club may have a place for him. Playing in Army matches, Cheadle was coached by Matt Busby, who managed to secure a trial for Cheadle for Liverpool against Stoke City. Cheadle took the advice of Fish and came to the Old Recreation Ground and signed professional forms in March 1946 for £8 a week. He made his league debut in a 4–1 victory against Ipswich Town on 2 March. His first goal was against Southend United in a 2–1 win on 20 April.

Signing as a professional in May 1946, he spent the 1946–47 season playing across the back four, and also spent time as a centre-forward in a few games. He played 37 games in 1946–47, and scored his first goal in the Football League at The Old Recreation Ground in a 5–1 win over Reading on 2 November. For the 1947–48 season, Cheadle spent 16 straight games as a striker, scoring a patch of seven goals in seven games. He also played for the reserve team in the Cheshire County League and represented the league against a Southern Football League XI at the Racecourse Ground on 23 October 1937. He hit a total of eight goals in 23 Third Division South games in 1947–48. He scored twice in 23 games in 1948–49, before making 46 appearances as a centre-half in 1949–50 under the stewardship of Gordon Hodgson. Cheadle was one of the starting XI who played in the first match at Vale Park. He played 36 games in 1950–51, including a draw with Millwall on 28 October at The Den, a game which he played until the end despite breaking three teeth in a hefty collision. He featured 40 times in 1951–52, surviving Ivor Powell's brief reign to establish himself as a key part of new manager Freddie Steele's first-team plans. He was an ever-present throughout the 49 games in the 1952–53 campaign, as the "Valiants" finished as runners-up in the Third Division North.

He was captain during the 1953–54 season, where Vale made it to the FA Cup semi-finals and won the Third Division North title. The team had conceded just 21 goals in 46 games with Cheadle at the heart of the 'Iron Curtain' defence consisting of Ray King (goalkeeper), Cheadle, Reg Potts, Stan Turner and Roy Sproson. In the semi-final clash with West Bromwich Albion at Villa Park he was dispossessed for the "Throstles" equaliser and gave away the penalty for Albion's winning goal. Cheadle featured only 26 times in the Second Division in 1954–55. He played 19 games in 1955–56 and 14 games in 1956–57, as the club suffered relegation under new boss Norman Low. His final game was a 6–0 defeat to Sheffield United on 25 March, a game in which Cheadle scored an own goal.

=== Crewe Alexandra ===
Now 38 years old, he moved to nearby Cheshire club Crewe Alexandra as a player-coach in July 1957. He played 37 league games for the "Railwaymen" as the club finished bottom of the Third Division North in 1957–58 under Maurice Lindley and 18th in the Fourth Division in 1958–59 under the stewardship of Harry Ware. He retired as a player at Gresty Road in 1959.

== Style of play ==
Former teammate Roy Sproson said: "Tom was quick and strong, and nobody could beat him. Pound for pound, in fact, I would say Tom is the hardest man I have ever met." In fact he had 22 stitches in the head after various collisions with opposition players, his toughness earning him the nickname "wooden head" from his teammates.

== Personal and later life ==
Cheadle was married and had a son, Peter. Following his retirement, Cheadle became a postman in Porthill. The pub at Vale Park was named Tommy Cheadle's in honour of his contribution to the club.

== Career statistics ==
Appearances and goals by club, season and competition
Club	Season	League			FA Cup		Total	
Club	Season	Division	Apps	Goals	Apps	Goals	Apps	Goals
Port Vale	1946–47	Third Division South	32	3	5	0	37	3
Port Vale	1947–48	Third Division South	23	8	0	0	23	8
Port Vale	1948–49	Third Division South	22	2	1	0	23	2
Port Vale	1949–50	Third Division South	42	1	4	0	46	1
Port Vale	1950–51	Third Division South	32	0	4	0	36	0
Port Vale	1951–52	Third Division South	39	0	1	0	40	0
Port Vale	1952–53	Third Division North	46	0	2	0	48	0
Port Vale	1953–54	Third Division North	38	0	8	0	46	0
Port Vale	1954–55	Second Division	26	0	0	0	26	0
Port Vale	1955–56	Second Division	19	0	0	0	19	0
Port Vale	1956–57	Second Division	14	0	0	0	14	0
Port Vale	Total		333	14	25	0	358	14
Crewe Alexandra	1957–58	Third Division North	32	0	1	0	33	0
Crewe Alexandra	1958–59	Fourth Division	5	0	1	0	6	0
Crewe Alexandra	Total		37	0	2	0	39	0
Career total			370	14	27	0	397	14

== Honours ==
Port Vale

- Football League Third Division North: 1953–54

Individual

- Port Vale F.C. Hall of Fame: inducted 2026 (inaugural)
