= Stan Smith (footballer, born 1931) =

English footballer and manager

Personal information
- Full name: Stanley James Smith
- Date of birth: 24 February 1931
- Place of birth: Kidsgrove, England
- Date of death: 8 April 2010 (aged 79)
- Place of death: Kidsgrove, England
- Position: Forward

Youth career
- Stoke City

Senior career*
Years	Team	Apps	(Gls)
1950–1957	Port Vale	60	(19)
1957–1958	Crewe Alexandra	28	(6)
1958	Oldham Athletic	4	(0)
1958–1960	Witton Albion		
1960–1963	Macclesfield Town	109	(86)
1964–1965	Stafford Rangers		
- Runcorn
- New Brighton
Total		201+	(111+)

Managerial career
- Winsford United
- 1964–1965: Stafford Rangers
- * Club domestic league appearances and goals

Stanley James Smith (24 February 1931 – 8 April 2010) was an English footballer. A forward, he scored 25 goals in 92 league games in an eight-year career in the English Football League. He spent 1950 to 1957 with Port Vale, and later had brief spells with Crewe Alexandra, Oldham Athletic, Witton Albion, Macclesfield Town, Stafford Rangers, Runcorn, New Brighton and managed Winsford United and Alsager Town.

== Career ==
Smith played for Stoke City before joining rivals Port Vale in May 1950. He was a factory worker. It took until 27 September 1954 for manager Freddie Steele to hand him his debut, in a 1–0 defeat at Doncaster Rovers. He scored his first goal at Vale Park in a 3–3 draw with Ipswich Town on 23 October, and went on to score eight goals in 26 games in 1954–55, including two against West Ham United in the FA Cup. Smith scored five goals in 20 Second Division games in 1955–56, including a brace against Bristol City on 30 March.

He scored twice past Sheffield United in a 4–2 defeat at Bramall Lane on 25 August 1956, and seven days later scored another brace against Bristol City. A week later, he scored another two goals in a 4–2 win over Blackburn Rovers at Ewood Park. He also scored against Potteries derby rivals Stoke City in a 3–1 defeat at the Victoria Ground on 10 October. However, he lost his first-team place in November 1956 and finished the 1956–57 season with eight goals in 17 appearances. New manager Norman Low sold him on to Crewe Alexandra in July 1957, who finished bottom of the Third Division North under Maurice Lindley's stewardship in 1957–58. He then played four league games for Oldham Athletic after being signed for a £250 fee. Still, he left Boundary Park after telling the club he did not want to be a full-time professional as he was employed as a planning engineer for English Electric. He moved on to Cheshire County League club Witton Albion later in 1958, and scored 32 goals from 45 games in the 1958–59 season. He scored 26 goals in 40 games during the 1959–60 campaign. He scored two goals in seven games at the start of the 1960–61 season, before he signed with Macclesfield Town in 1960. He scored a brace on his debut against Stafford Rangers at Moss Rose and went on to score seven hat-tricks and 38 league goals to become the club's top-scorer in the 1960–61 season. He scored 26 goals in 41 league games in the 1961–62 campaign and 22 in 37 league matches in the 1962–63 season, finishing as the club's top-scorer. He went on to play for Stafford Rangers, Runcorn and New Brighton.

== Post-retirement ==
Upon his retirement as a player, Smith became manager of non-League club Winsford United. After his career in the game finished, Smith remained a keen Port Vale fan and later became the chairman of the Executive Club. He worked at ROF Radway Green, English Electric in Kidsgrove, and ICL at Winsford. He later ran his own firm in Chesterton, Staffordshire. He married Brenda in 1951.

== Career statistics ==
Appearances and goals by club, season and competition
Club	Season	League			FA Cup		Total	
Club	Season	Division	Apps	Goals	Apps	Goals	Apps	Goals
Port Vale	1953–54	Third Division North	0	0	0	0	0	0
Port Vale	1954–55	Second Division	23	6	3	2	26	8
Port Vale	1955–56	Second Division	20	5	0	0	20	5
Port Vale	1956–57	Second Division	17	8	0	0	17	8
Port Vale	Total		60	19	3	2	63	21
Crewe Alexandra	1957–58	Third Division North	28	6	1	0	29	6
Oldham Athletic	1957–58	Third Division North	4	0	0	0	4	0
Witton Albion	1958–59	Cheshire County League					45	32
Witton Albion	1959–60	Cheshire County League					40	26
Witton Albion	1960–61	Cheshire County League					7	2
Witton Albion	Total						92	60
Macclesfield Town	1960–61	Cheshire County League	31	38	0	0	31	38
Macclesfield Town	1961–62	Cheshire County League	41	26	2	1	43	27
Macclesfield Town	1962–63	Cheshire County League	37	22	2	2	39	24
Macclesfield Town	Total		109	86	4	3	113	89
