= Derek Mountford =

English footballer

Personal information
- Full name: Derek Mountford
- Date of birth: 24 March 1934
- Place of birth: Stoke-on-Trent, England
- Date of death: January 1994 (aged 59)
- Place of death: Stoke-on-Trent, England
- Position: Right-half

Youth career
- Port Vale

Senior career*
Years	Team	Apps	(Gls)
1951–1957	Port Vale	26	(0)
1957–1958	Crewe Alexandra	13	(0)
- Northwich Victoria
- Stafford Rangers
Total		39+	(0+)
- * Club domestic league appearances and goals

Derek Mountford (24 March 1934 – January 1994) was an English footballer who played for Port Vale, Crewe Alexandra, Northwich Victoria and Stafford Rangers in the 1950s.

== Career ==
Mountford graduated through the Port Vale juniors to sign with the club as a professional in May 1951. He played the last two Second Division games of the 1954–55 season, and made his debut at Vale Park on 30 April, in a 1–0 win over Rotherham United. He played 15 games in the 1955–56 campaign, but soon fell out of manager Freddie Steele's first-team plans. He featured in nine league and two FA Cup games in the 1956–57 season, but was released by new boss Norman Low in July 1957 after the "Valiants" suffered relegation. He then played 13 Third Division North games for nearby Crewe Alexandra as Maurice Lindley's "Railwaymen" finished bottom of the Football League in 1957–58. He then departed Gresty Road and later played for non-League sides Northwich Victoria and Stafford Rangers.

== Career statistics ==
Appearances and goals by club, season and competition
Club	Season	League			FA Cup		Total	
Club	Season	Division	Apps	Goals	Apps	Goals	Apps	Goals
Port Vale	1953–54	Third Division North	0	0	0	0	0	0
Port Vale	1954–55	Second Division	2	0	0	0	2	0
Port Vale	1955–56	Second Division	15	0	0	0	15	0
Port Vale	1956–57	Second Division	9	0	2	0	11	0
Port Vale	Total		26	0	2	0	28	0
Crewe Alexandra	1957–58	Third Division North	13	0	0	0	13	0
Career total			39	0	2	0	41	0
