= Colin Askey =

English footballer

Personal information
- Full name: Colin Askey
- Date of birth: 3 October 1932 (age 94)
- Place of birth: Milton, Stoke-on-Trent, England
- Height: 5 ft 7 in (1.70 m)
- Position: Right winger

Youth career
- Milton Youth Club
- British Aluminium
- 1947–1949: Port Vale

Senior career*
Years	Team	Apps	(Gls)
1949–1958	Port Vale	200	(21)
1958–1962	Walsall	83	(12)
1962–1964	Mansfield Town	30	(2)
- Wellington Town
- Stafford Rangers
- Winsford United
1965–1966	Macclesfield Town	3	(0)
- Milton United
Total		316+	(35+)

Managerial career
- Milton United
- * Club domestic league appearances and goals

Colin Askey (born 3 October 1932) is an English former footballer who played on the right wing. He made 341 league and cup appearances in a 15-year career in the English Football League, scoring 40 goals. His son, John Askey, played for and managed Macclesfield Town.

He is most famed for his time at Port Vale, where he scored 23 goals in 217 games between 1949 and 1958. This period was one of the most memorable in the club's history, as the "Valiants" stormed to the Third Division North title and FA Cup semi-finals in 1953–54. Following this, he spent four years with Walsall and then two years at Mansfield Town. He won two successive promotions with the "Saddlers" in 1959–60 and 1960–61, and also won promotion out of the Fourth Division with the "Stags" in 1962–63. He then went into non-League football, playing for Wellington Town, Stafford Rangers, Winsford United, Macclesfield Town, and Milton United.

== Playing career ==
=== Port Vale ===
Askey was a ground-staff boy at Port Vale in 1947. Askey came through the Port Vale juniors to sign professional forms in October 1949. He had the option of signing with Stoke City or Bolton Wanderers, but felt he had more chance to win a first-team place at the Old Recreation Ground. He played four Third Division South games for Gordon Hodgson's "Valiants" in 1949–50 after making his debut in a 2–1 defeat at Brighton & Hove Albion on 18 March, though spent much of his time serving his conscription with the RAF. He featured seven times in 1951–52 and ten times in 1952–53, and scored his first senior goal on 6 April 1953, in a 2–2 draw with Chester City at Sealand Road. He scored six goals in 53 appearances in 1953–54, as Freddie Steele's side won the Third Division North title and reached the FA Cup semi-finals. Following his performance in a win at Ninian Park, First Division club Cardiff City made a blank cheque offer which was refused in January 1954. Cardiff made the blank cheque offer after Vale initially rejected an offer of £30,000. Vale also recorded a win over Stanley Matthews' Blackpool on the way to the semi-finals, and were only denied a place in the final itself after some debatable refereeing decisions handed West Bromwich Albion victory in the semi-finals. He later recalled that Albert Leake's equalising goal was incorrectly ruled out for offside as "I'd pulled it back to him".

Askey scored four goals in 39 Second Division games in 1954–55. He made 26 appearances in 1955–56, before he scored five goals in 39 games in 1956–57, as Vale suffered relegation under new boss Norman Low. He scored seven goals in 37 games in 1957–58, before he departed Vale Park when he was sold to Walsall for 'a fairly substantial fee' in July 1958. However, he continued to train at Vale Park until 17 December 1960, when he angered Norman Low by "celebrating too much" after helping Walsall beat Vale 6–2. Following that incident he trained at the Victoria Ground.

=== Walsall ===
The "Saddlers" finished sixth in the Fourth Division in 1958–59, just six points outside the promotion places. Bill Moore's side went on to win the league title in 1959–60, before winning a second-successive promotion with a second-place finish in the Third Division in 1960–61. The Fellows Park club posted a 14th-place finish in the Second Division in 1961–62 before Askey moved on to Mansfield Town.

=== Mansfield Town ===
Askey joined Mansfield Town on a free transfer in 1962. He had spent 18 months on the sidelines after a horrific challenge from Port Vale's Roy Pritchard. The "Stags" won promotion out of the Fourth Division in fourth place in 1962–63 under Raich Carter's stewardship, and then finished seventh in the Third Division in 1963–64 under Tommy Cummings.

=== Later career ===
Askey then departed Field Mill and went on to play for Wellington Town (Southern League), Stafford Rangers, Winsford United, Macclesfield Town, Milton United, and pub teams 'The Ancient Briton' and 'The Miner's Arms' (in Milton).

== Style of play ==
Former teammate Roy Sproson said: "Only his lack of real speed stopped Colin from becoming a great player because he had all the other equipment. A good crosser of the ball, Colin would take defenders on and was as brave as a lion, too", with a good "overall consistency." He was fit enough to track back and defend when the opposition was in possession – a rare trait for attackers of the 1950s. His former goalkeeper at Port Vale, Ray King, said that "He would consistently display a level of skill and an indomitable strength that were quite amazing" and he was impressed with his "phenomenal work rate" and the way that he "beat an opponent with comparative ease and passed and crossed the ball using either foot with supreme accuracy."

== Management career ==
After finally retiring from football, he became the manager, later chairman, of Milton United. He also managed the Ind Coope Sunday League team before becoming the northern area manager of the Staffordshire Football Association. After retiring as a player he worked in the insurance industry.

== Personal life ==
Askey met his wife June at the Palace Cinema in Hanley when they were 15 years old and they married in May 1953 St John's Church in Abbey Hulton. They had five children: Bob, Mark, Steve, John and Joanne. John played for and managed Macclesfield Town before becoming manager of Port Vale, his father's club. Bob managed Newcastle Town. His grandson, James Askey, played amateur football for Newcastle Town. Askey was inducted in the Stoke-on-Trent Sporting hall of fame in November 2021.

== Career statistics ==
Appearances and goals by club, season and competition
Club	Season	League			FA Cup		League Cup		Total	
Club	Season	Division	Apps	Goals	Apps	Goals	Apps	Goals	Apps	Goals
Port Vale	1949–50	Third Division South	4	0	0	0	—		4	0
Port Vale	1950–51	Third Division South	0	0	0	0	—		0	0
Port Vale	1951–52	Third Division South	7	0	0	0	—		7	0
Port Vale	1952–53	Third Division North	9	1	0	0	—		9	1
Port Vale	1953–54	Third Division North	45	5	8	1	—		53	6
Port Vale	1954–55	Second Division	39	4	3	0	—		42	4
Port Vale	1955–56	Second Division	24	0	2	0	—		26	0
Port Vale	1956–57	Second Division	37	5	2	0	—		39	5
Port Vale	1957–58	Third Division South	35	6	2	1	—		37	7
Port Vale	Total		200	21	17	2	0	0	217	23
Walsall	1958–59	Fourth Division	25	6	1	0	—		26	6
Walsall	1959–60	Fourth Division	12	2	0	0	—		12	2
Walsall	1960–61	Third Division	38	4	1	0	1	0	40	4
Walsall	1961–62	Second Division	8	0	0	0	1	0	9	0
Walsall	Total		83	12	2	0	2	0	87	12
Mansfield Town	1962–63	Fourth Division	25	2	5	3	2	0	32	5
Mansfield Town	1963–64	Third Division	5	0	0	0	0	0	5	0
Mansfield Town	Total		30	2	5	3	2	0	37	5
Career total			313	35	24	5	4	0	341	40

== Honours ==
Port Vale

- Football League Third Division North: 1953–54

Walsall

- Football League Fourth Division: 1959–60
- Football League Third Division second-place promotion: 1960–61

Mansfield Town

- Football League Fourth Division fourth-place promotion: 1962–63
