= Harry Anders =

English footballer (1926–1994)

Personal information
- Full name: Harry Anders
- Date of birth: 28 November 1926
- Place of birth: St Helens, Merseyside, England
- Date of death: October 1994 (aged 67)
- Place of death: Blackpool, England
- Height: 5 ft 5 in (1.65 m)
- Position: Winger

Youth career
- St Helens Town

Senior career*
Years	Team	Apps	(Gls)
1947–1953	Preston North End	69	(4)
1953–1956	Manchester City	32	(4)
1956–1957	Port Vale	3	(0)
1957–1960	Accrington Stanley	114	(18)
1960–1961	Workington	7	(1)
- Runcorn
Total		225+	(27+)
- * Club domestic league appearances and goals

Harry Anders (28 November 1926 – October 1994) was an English professional footballer who scored 30 goals in 225 league appearances in a 14-year career in the Football League with Preston North End, Manchester City, Port Vale, Accrington Stanley, and Workington. He helped Preston North End to the Second Division title in 1950–51 as well as second in the First Division in 1952–53; he also finished second in the Third Division North with Accrington Stanley in 1957–58. His brother was fellow footballer Jimmy Anders.

== Career ==
Anders played for St Helens Town before joining Preston North End for the 1947–48 season. The "Lambs" were then a First Division club, but suffered relegation in 1948–49. Preston finished sixth in the Second Division in 1949–50 under the stewardship of Will Scott, before winning the division in 1950–51. They then finished seventh in 1951–52, before missing out on the Football League title in 1952–53 after finishing behind champions Arsenal on goal average. Anders scored four goals in 69 league games at Deepdale. He then switched to league rivals Manchester City, who finished 17th in 1953–54, seventh in 1954–55, and fourth in 1955–56 under the stewardship of Les McDowall. Anders scored four goals in 32 top-flight games during his spell at Maine Road. He was signed by Port Vale manager Freddie Steele for "a substantial fee" in July 1956. However, he only made three appearances in the 1956–57 season as the "Valiants" were relegated in last place in the Second Division. He was sold by new manager Norman Low to Accrington Stanley for "a small fee" in June 1957. Walter Galbraith's "'Owd Reds" finished as the Third Division North runners-up in 1957–58, seven points behind champions Scunthorpe & Lindsey United. New boss George Eastham led Stanley to a 19th-place finish in the newly created Third Division in 1958–59, before they were relegated in last place in 1959–60. Anders scored 18 goals in 114 league games in his time at Peel Park. He scored one goal in seven Fourth Division games for Joe Harvey's Workington in a brief stay with the "Reds" at Borough Park in the 1960–61 campaign. He later played for Cheshire County League side Runcorn.

== Career statistics ==
Appearances and goals by club, season and competition
Club	Season	League			FA Cup		Total	
Club	Season	Division	Apps	Goals	Apps	Goals	Apps	Goals
Preston North End	1945–46		0	0	1	0	1	0
Preston North End	1946–47	First Division	0	0	0	0	0	0
Preston North End	1947–48	First Division	20	0	4	1	24	1
Preston North End	1948–49	First Division	15	2	0	0	15	2
Preston North End	1949–50	Second Division	19	1	0	0	19	1
Preston North End	1950–51	Second Division	6	0	0	0	6	0
Preston North End	1951–52	First Division	7	0	0	0	7	0
Preston North End	1952–53	First Division	2	1	0	0	2	1
Preston North End	Total		69	4	5	1	74	5
Manchester City	1952–53	First Division	12	1	0	0	12	1
Manchester City	1953–54	First Division	19	3	1	0	20	0
Manchester City	1954–55	First Division	1	0	0	0	1	0
Manchester City	Total		32	4	1	0	33	4
Port Vale	1956–57	Second Division	3	0	0	0	3	0
Accrington Stanley	1957–58	Third Division North	39	9	5	0	44	5
Accrington Stanley	1958–59	Third Division	44	1	5	1	49	2
Accrington Stanley	1959–60	Third Division	31	8	0	0	31	8
Accrington Stanley	Total		114	18	10	1	124	19
Workington	1960–61	Fourth Division	7	1	1	0	8	1
Career total			225	27	17	2	242	29
