= Len Stephenson =

English footballer

Personal information
- Full name: Robert Leonard Stephenson
- Date of birth: 14 July 1930
- Place of birth: Blackpool, England
- Date of death: 29 September 2014 (aged 84)
- Height: 5 ft 9 in (1.75 m)
- Position: Centre-forward

Youth career
- St. Mary's Youth Club

Senior career*
Years	Team	Apps	(Gls)
1948–1955	Blackpool	24	(10)
1955–1957	Port Vale	61	(16)
1957–1958	Oldham Athletic	8	(0)
- Witton Albion
Total		93	(26)
- * Club domestic league appearances and goals

Robert Leonard Stephenson (14 July 1930 – 29 September 2014) was an English footballer. A centre-forward, he scored 26 goals in 93 league games in a seven-year career in the Football League for Blackpool, Port Vale, and Oldham Athletic.

== Career ==
Stephenson began his professional career with Joe Smith's Blackpool in November 1948. It wasn't until just over two years later, on 20 January 1951, that he made his debut in a 2–2 league draw with Sunderland at Bloomfield Road. He scored the hosts' second goal in his only appearance of the 1950–51 campaign. He made three First Division appearances during the following season, before injury struck, and sat out the entire 1952–53 term, at the climax of which Blackpool won the FA Cup.

Stephenson returned to the Blackpool line-up two-thirds of the way through 1953–54, scoring their first goal in a 3–2 home league victory over Aston Villa on 23 January. He made seven more league appearances that season, scoring another three goals. He also scored in the FA Cup, in Blackpool's third-round replay victory over Luton Town at Molineux Stadium.

He scored five goals in his eleven league appearances during 1954–55, including the only goal of the game in a victory over West Bromwich Albion at The Hawthorns on 11 December. He made his final appearance for the "Seasiders" on 15 January, in a 2–0 defeat at home to Wolves.

Stephenson joined Port Vale on 10 March 1955 for £5,000. He scored his first goal for the "Valiants" on 19 March, in a 2–1 defeat to Nottingham Forest at Vale Park. He made a further nine Second Division appearances, without scoring any further goals, in the 1954–55 season.

With 14 goals in 33 appearances, he was the club's top scorer in the 1955–56 season; however, he lost his place in January 1957 after manager Freddie Steele resigned from his post. The club were relegated under new boss Norman Low, and Stephenson was transferred to Oldham Athletic for £1,025 in June 1957. He made eight Third Division North appearances for Ted Goodier's "Latics" in 1957–58, before departing Boundary Park to finish his career with Cheshire County League side Witton Albion. He scored 11 goals in 23 games in the 1958–59 season and 11 goals from 39 games in the 1959–60 campaign.

== Career statistics ==
Appearances and goals by club, season and competition
Club	Season	League			FA Cup		Total	
Club	Season	Division	Apps	Goals	Apps	Goals	Apps	Goals
Blackpool	1950–51	First Division	1	1	0	0	1	1
Blackpool	1951–52	First Division	3	0	0	0	3	0
Blackpool	1952–53	First Division	9	4	4	1	13	5
Blackpool	1953–54	First Division	11	5	0	0	11	5
Blackpool	Total		24	10	4	1	28	11
Port Vale	1954–55	Second Division	10	1	0	0	10	1
Port Vale	1955–56	Second Division	31	12	2	2	33	14
Port Vale	1956–57	Second Division	20	3	2	1	22	4
Port Vale	Total		61	16	4	3	65	19
Oldham Athletic	1957–58	Third Division North	8	0	0	0	8	0
Career total			93	26	8	4	101	30
