= Tom Davis (footballer, born 1901) =

English footballer

Personal information
- Full name: Thomas John Davis
- Date of birth: c. 1901
- Place of birth: Bucknall, Staffordshire, England
- Position: Centre-half

Senior career*
Years	Team	Apps	(Gls)
1923–1925	Port Vale	14	(0)
- Stafford Rangers
- * Club domestic league appearances and goals

Thomas John Davis (born c. 1901; date of death unknown) was an English footballer who played at centre-half for Port Vale and Stafford Rangers in the 1920s.

== Early life ==
Thomas John Davis was born around 1900 or 1901, the eldest of three children to Mary Alice Talbot and Thomas Davis, and half-brother to nine siblings born to Mary Alice and her second husband, Thomas Stevenson. His nephew, John Poole, would also become a professional footballer.

== Career ==
Davis joined Port Vale in August 1923. He made his first-team debut in a 1–0 victory over Clapton Orient at the Old Recreation Ground on 10 November 1923. He was a regular in the Vale first-team until losing his place in March 1924. He was released at the end of the 1924–25 season with 14 Second Division appearances to his name. He moved on to Stafford Rangers, before becoming a committee member of the Stoke-on-Trent Electricity Sports Club.

== Career statistics ==
Appearances and goals by club, season and competition
Club	Season	League			FA Cup		Other		Total	
Club	Season	Division	Apps	Goals	Apps	Goals	Apps	Goals	Apps	Goals
Port Vale	1923–24	Second Division	14	0	0	0	0	0	14	0
