= 1956–57 Port Vale F.C. season =

Port Vale F.C.
1956–57 season
- Chairman: Fred Burgess
- Manager: Freddie Steele (until 15 January); Norman Low (February onwards)
- Stadium: Vale Park
- Football League Second Division: 22nd (22 points)
- FA Cup: Third Round (eliminated by Barnsley)
- Top goalscorer: League: Cyril Done (9); All: Cyril Done (9)
- Highest home attendance: 22,395 vs. Stoke City, 29 April 1957
- Lowest home attendance: 7,038 vs. Rotherham United, 27 April 1957
- Average home league attendance: 14,046
- Biggest win: 3–0 and 4–1
- Biggest defeat: 0–6 and 1–7
Home colours

The 1956–57 season was Port Vale's 45th season of football in the English Football League, and their third-successive season (thirty-second overall) in the Second Division. It proved to be a catastrophic year as Port Vale were relegated after finishing bottom (22nd) with just 22 points from 42 matches.

Manager Freddie Steele, the architect of the famed "Steele Curtain", resigned in January 1957 and was succeeded by Norman Low in February, though the change did little to reverse the club's fortunes. The season featured several still-standing, unwanted club records: a club‑worst 28 league defeats, a 22‑game run without a clean sheet (22 September 1956 to 23 February 1957), and a nine‑match losing streak (9 March to 20 April 1957). Cyril Done ended the campaign as both league and season top scorer, with just nine goals. Vale Park had an average attendance of 14,046, although the fixture against Potteries derby rivals Stoke City drew a season-high 22,395 on 29 April 1957 — just before relegation was confirmed. In the FA Cup, Vale were knocked out by Barnsley in the Third Round.

== Overview ==
=== Second Division ===
The pre-season saw the arrival of Harry Anders, a winger from Manchester City signed for 'a substantial fee'.

The season started with Anders and Baily up front, a combination which failed during a goalless draw with Barnsley. Two losses followed in which eight goals were conceded, with Colin Askey replacing Anders after a 4–0 defeat at Lincoln City. A 4–2 loss came at Bramall Lane despite them leading Sheffield United by two goals until the 53rd-minute. Harry Poole replaced Albert Leake at right-half in what was 'one of the few rays of sunlight in an otherwise gloomy beginning'. Vale then 'clicked into gear', picking up seven points out of a possible ten in September. This included a 4–2 win over Blackburn Rovers at Ewood Park on 8 September, their last away win of the campaign. Injuries then ravaged the squad as Vale went on a sequence of eight straight defeats to take them from 14th to second from bottom. These included losses at the City Ground, Victoria Ground (in the first ever floodlit game in the Potteries), and Anfield. In October, Baily was sold to Nottingham Forest for £7,000 – exactly what Vale had paid for him earlier in the year. Baily had failed to fit in with the team and was seen as too individualistic, bringing confusion to his teammates. On 10 October, Vale were beaten 3–1 at Stoke City as a Potteries derby game was played under floodlights for the first time. On 27 October, Vale fell to a 2–1 home defeat to bottom club Notts County despite having a man advantage for an hour. They lost 4–1 to Liverpool the following week at Anfield.

In November, Steele bought experienced forward Billy Spurdle from Manchester City for £4,000. He scored on his debut in a 3–2 win over Bury on 24 November, and two weeks later he scored a brace in a 4–2 win over Doncaster Rovers. This temporarily took them away from relegation worries before a streak of seven games without victory. On 15 January, Steele resigned, saying "I am quite prepared to face the consequences". On 2 February, Nottingham Forest travelled to Vale Park with Eddie Baily, and demolished Vale 7–1 in a record defeat for the club at Vale Park. A week later, the "Valiants" put three past Fulham at Craven Cottage, but failed to pick up any points as Ray King conceded six goals despite a brilliant performance. On 18 February, 42-year-old Norman Low of Workington Town took the £2,000 a year job as Vale manager. Low had no interest in the tactics of the opposition, and simply told his players to 'entertain the public'. He was confident the players at his disposal could reach safety, despite the difficult situation they found themselves in. His second match in charge saw a 3–0 win over Grimsby Town which took them out of the relegation zone. Yet what followed was a club-record nine game losing streak that doomed their season, five of which were played in Burslem.

On 9 March, Vale were beaten 3–1 at bottom club Notts County. Low experimented with his team by dropping King and Roy Sproson (on a run of 128 consecutive appearances), but all that resulted was a 6–0 hammering from Sheffield United. However, it was their 1–0 defeat at Gigg Lane to struggling Bury that did more damage to their prospects of survival. During this spell, Reg Potts made his 166th consecutive appearance in a defeat to Bristol Rovers, though Low put young reserves into the fray after all seemed lost. After relegation was confirmed, Vale seemed to play better with the pressure lifted, and picked up five points in their last three games, including a 2–2 draw at home to rivals Stoke City. Low also announced his plans to rebuild the club, initiating a lengthy series of schoolboy trials.

They finished bottom of the table with 22 points, losing 18 of their 21 away games. They were eight points short of third-from-bottom Notts County. Their 57 goals scored was greater only than Lincoln City, whilst 'the Steele Curtain' was broken, conceding 101 goals, fewer than only two Football League clubs (Charlton Athletic and Crewe Alexandra). Top scorer Cyril Done only score nine goals, as no consistent scorer emerged all season long.

=== Finances ===
On the financial side, 105,000 spectators had been lost from the previous season to an average of only 14,046, leaving an income from gate receipts of £40,717. Despite this a profit of £1,268 was recorded. This occurred because of a wage budget cut of around £8,000 to £20,684 and a transfer credit of £625. The club's debts were worrying, however, causing the club's directors to funnel £2,500 of their own resources towards repaying this debt. A clear-out of players was initiated for the first time in a good while, those departing included: Cyril Done (Winsford United); Ray King (sold to Boston United for £2,500); Reg Potts and Stan Turner (Worcester City); Tommy Cheadle, Stan Smith, and Derek Mountford (Crewe Alexandra); Len Stephenson and Billy Spurdle (Oldham Athletic); and Harry Anders (Accrington Stanley). Though many of these were some of the club's best players, many had also reached retirement age. Low admitted that he would have to buy young players to fill the vacancies in the first-team.

=== FA Cup ===
In the FA Cup, Vale drew 3–3 with Barnsley at Oakwell, before losing the replay 1–0.

== Results ==
=== Football League Second Division ===
==== League table ====
Pos	Team	Pld	W	D	L	GF	GA	GAv	Pts	Qualification or relegation
1	Leicester City (C, P)	42	25	11	6	109	67	1.627	61	Promotion to the First Division
2	Nottingham Forest (P)	42	22	10	10	94	55	1.709	54	Promotion to the First Division
3	Liverpool	42	21	11	10	82	54	1.519	53	
4	Blackburn Rovers	42	21	10	11	83	75	1.107	52	
5	Stoke City	42	20	8	14	83	58	1.431	48	
6	Middlesbrough	42	19	10	13	84	60	1.400	48	
7	Sheffield United	42	19	8	15	87	76	1.145	46	
8	West Ham United	42	19	8	15	59	63	0.937	46	
9	Bristol Rovers	42	18	9	15	81	67	1.209	45	
10	Swansea Town	42	19	7	16	90	90	1.000	45	
11	Fulham	42	19	4	19	84	76	1.105	42	
12	Huddersfield Town	42	18	6	18	68	74	0.919	42	
13	Bristol City	42	16	9	17	74	79	0.937	41	
14	Doncaster Rovers	42	15	10	17	77	77	1.000	40	
15	Leyton Orient	42	15	10	17	66	84	0.786	40	
16	Grimsby Town	42	17	5	20	61	62	0.984	39	
17	Rotherham United	42	13	11	18	74	75	0.987	37	
18	Lincoln City	42	14	6	22	54	80	0.675	34	
19	Barnsley	42	12	10	20	59	89	0.663	34	
20	Notts County	42	9	12	21	58	86	0.674	30	
21	Bury (R)	42	8	9	25	60	96	0.625	25	Relegation to the Third Division North
22	Port Vale (R)	42	8	6	28	57	101	0.564	22	Relegation to the Third Division South

Rules for classification: 1) Points; 2) Goal average; 3) Goals scored
(C) Champions; (P) Promoted; (R) Relegated

==== Results by matchday ====
Round	1	2	3	4	5	6	7	8	9	10	11	12	13	14	15	16	17	18	19	20	21	22	23	24	25	26	27	28	29	30	31	32	33	34	35	36	37	38	39	40	41	42
Ground	H	A	A	H	H	A	H	A	H	A	A	H	A	H	A	H	A	H	A	H	A	A	A	H	A	H	A	H	A	H	A	H	A	H	H	A	H	H	A	A	H	H
Result	D	L	L	D	W	W	D	L	W	L	L	L	L	L	L	L	L	W	L	W	L	D	L	L	L	L	L	W	L	W	L	L	L	L	L	L	L	L	L	D	W	D
Position	8	18	20	18	16	16	16	17	14	17	18	17	18	20	20	20	20	20	20	20	20	20	20	21	21	21	21	21	21	21	21	21	22	22	22	22	22	22	22	22	22	22
Points	1	1	1	2	4	6	7	7	9	9	9	9	9	9	9	9	9	11	11	13	13	14	14	14	14	14	14	16	16	18	18	18	18	18	18	18	18	18	18	19	21	22

Source: Statto
A = Away; H = Home; W = Win; D = Draw; L = Loss

==== Matches ====
18 August 1956 1	Port Vale	0–0	Barnsley	Burslem
		Report		Stadium: Vale Park; Attendance: 14,336

22 August 1956 2	Lincoln City	4–0	Port Vale	Lincoln
		Report		Stadium: Sincil Bank; Attendance: 11,863

25 August 1956 3	Sheffield United	4–2	Port Vale	Sheffield
		Report	Smith	Stadium: Bramall Lane; Attendance: 21,950

27 August 1956 4	Port Vale	1–1	Lincoln City	Burslem
	Done	Report		Stadium: Vale Park; Attendance: 13,595

1 September 1956 5	Port Vale	3–1	Bristol City	Burslem
	Smith; Done	Report		Stadium: Vale Park; Attendance: 17,645

8 September 1956 6	Blackburn Rovers	2–4	Port Vale	Blackburn
		Report	Smith; Stephenson (og.)	Stadium: Ewood Park; Attendance: 20,753

15 September 1956 7	Port Vale	0–0	West Ham United	Burslem
		Report		Stadium: Vale Park; Attendance: 17,582

22 September 1956 8	Nottingham Forest	4–2	Port Vale	West Bridgford
15:00 BST	Morley 3'; Lishman 57'; Hayward 80' (og.); Burkitt 87'	Report	Smith; Baily	Stadium: City Ground; Attendance: 18,699; Referee: A Holland

29 September 1956 9	Port Vale	2–1	Fulham	Burslem
	Askey; Done	Report		Stadium: Vale Park; Attendance: 21,281

6 October 1956 10	Middlesbrough	3–1	Port Vale	Middlesbrough
	Delapenha 11' (pen.), 31' (pen.); Clough 23'	Report	Stephenson	Stadium: Ayresome Park; Attendance: 18,586; Referee: E Crawford

10 October 1956 11	Stoke City	3–1	Port Vale	Stoke-upon-Trent
	Coleman; Kelly	Report	Smith	Stadium: Victoria Ground; Attendance: 39,446

13 October 1956 12	Port Vale	2–3	Leicester City	Burslem
	Hayward	Report	Hogg; Rowley	Stadium: Vale Park; Attendance: 21,690

20 October 1956 13	Grimsby Town	1–0	Port Vale	Cleethorpes
		Report		Stadium: Blundell Park; Attendance: 13,801

27 October 1956 14	Port Vale	1–2	Notts County	Burslem
	Done	Report		Stadium: Vale Park; Attendance: 13,137

3 November 1956 15	Liverpool	4–1	Port Vale	Liverpool
	Liddell 53'; Wheeler 81', 82', 85'	Report	Steele	Stadium: Anfield; Attendance: 32,334

10 November 1956 16	Port Vale	1–2	Leyton Orient	Burslem
	(og.)	Report		Stadium: Vale Park; Attendance: 8,404

17 November 1956 17	Huddersfield Town	3–1	Port Vale	Huddersfield
	Marriott; Sproson (og.); Hickson	Report	Poole	Stadium: Leeds Road; Attendance: 14,044

24 November 1956 18	Port Vale	3–2	Bury	Burslem
	Askey; Spurdle; Stephenson	Report		Stadium: Vale Park; Attendance: 11,840

1 December 1956 19	Bristol Rovers	2–1	Port Vale	Bristol
		Report	Griffiths	Stadium: Eastville Stadium; Attendance: 21,268

8 December 1956 20	Port Vale	4–1	Doncaster Rovers	Burslem
	Cunliffe; Spurdle	Report		Stadium: Vale Park; Attendance: 12,330

15 December 1956 21	Barnsley	2–0	Port Vale	Barnsley
		Report		Stadium: Oakwell; Attendance: 9,683

29 December 1956 22	Bristol City	3–3	Port Vale	Ashton Gate, Bristol
		Report	Poole; Hayward	Stadium: Ashton Gate; Attendance: 18,561

1 January 1957 23	Rotherham United	1–0	Port Vale	Rotherham
		Report		Stadium: Millmoor; Attendance: 8,120

12 January 1957 24	Port Vale	0–3	Blackburn Rovers	Burslem
		Report		Stadium: Vale Park; Attendance: 12,422

19 January 1957 25	West Ham United	2–1	Port Vale	Upton Park, London
	Smith; Dick	Report	Sproson	Stadium: Boleyn Ground; Attendance: 17,229

2 February 1957 26	Port Vale	1–7	Nottingham Forest	Burslem
15:00 GMT	Askey	Report	Barrett 2', 72', 85'; Imlach 67'; Wilson 69'; Baily 76'; Imlach 78'	Stadium: Vale Park; Attendance: 18,185; Referee: F Gerrard

9 February 1957 27	Fulham	6–3	Port Vale	Fulham, West London
		Report	Done; Cunliffe; Spurdle	Stadium: Craven Cottage; Attendance: 13,967

16 February 1957 28	Port Vale	2–1	Middlesbrough	Burslem
	Done 51'; Cunliffe 82'	Report	Clough 3'	Stadium: Vale Park; Attendance: 20,766; Referee: E Crawford

23 February 1957 29	Leicester City	2–1	Port Vale	Leicester
	McDonald	Report	Spurdle	Stadium: Filbert Street; Attendance: 12,064

2 March 1957 30	Port Vale	3–0	Grimsby Town	Burslem
	Done; Askey	Report		Stadium: Vale Park; Attendance: 15,293

9 March 1957 31	Notts County	3–1	Port Vale	Nottingham
		Report	Potts	Stadium: Meadow Lane; Attendance: 17,324

16 March 1957 32	Port Vale	1–2	Liverpool	Burslem
	Spurdle	Report	Rowley 48', 73'	Stadium: Vale Park; Attendance: 14,241

23 March 1957 33	Leyton Orient	3–2	Port Vale	Leyton, East London
		Report	Askey; Leake	Stadium: Brisbane Road; Attendance: 14,412

25 March 1957 34	Port Vale	0–6	Sheffield United	Burslem
		Report		Stadium: Vale Park; Attendance: 9,249

30 March 1957 35	Port Vale	1–2	Huddersfield Town	Burslem
	Spurdle	Report	Massie; Taylor	Stadium: Vale Park; Attendance: 10,500

6 April 1957 36	Bury	1–0	Port Vale	Bury, Greater Manchester
		Report		Stadium: Gigg Lane; Attendance: 10,524

13 April 1957 37	Port Vale	2–3	Bristol Rovers	Burslem
	Steele; Done (pen.)	Report		Stadium: Vale Park; Attendance: 9,006

19 April 1957 38	Port Vale	0–2	Swansea Town	Burslem
		Report		Stadium: Vale Park; Attendance: 12,729

20 April 1957 39	Doncaster Rovers	4–0	Port Vale	Doncaster
		Report		Stadium: Belle Vue; Attendance: 7,626

22 April 1957 40	Swansea Town	2–2	Port Vale	Swansea
		Report	Cunliffe; Leake	Stadium: Vetch Field; Attendance: 11,629

27 April 1957 41	Port Vale	2–1	Rotherham United	Burslem
	Leake	Report		Stadium: Vale Park; Attendance: 7,038

29 April 1957 42	Port Vale	2–2	Stoke City	Burslem
	Cunliffe; Steele	Report	Graver; King	Stadium: Vale Park; Attendance: 22,395

=== FA Cup ===
5 January 1957 R3	Barnsley	3–3	Port Vale	Barnsley
		Report	Poole; Stephenson	Stadium: Oakwell; Attendance: 17,720

7 January 1957 Replay	Port Vale	0–1	Barnsley	Burslem
		Report		Stadium: Vale Park; Attendance: 15,718

== Squad statistics ==
=== Appearances and goals ===
Key to positions: GK – Goalkeeper; FB – Full back; HB – Half back; FW – Forward

No.	Pos	Nat	Player	Total		Second Division		FA Cup	
No.	Pos	Nat	Player	Apps	Goals	Apps	Goals	Apps	Goals
	GK	(England) ENG	Ray King	39	0	37	0	2	0
	GK	(England) ENG	John Poole	3	0	3	0	0	0
	GK	(England) ENG	Leslie Wood	2	0	2	0	0	0
	FB	(England) ENG	Reg Potts	41	1	39	1	2	0
	FB	(England) ENG	David Raine	1	0	1	0	0	0
	FB	(England) ENG	Stan Turner	29	0	27	0	2	0
	FB	(England) ENG	Selwyn Whalley	6	0	6	0	0	0
	FB	(England) ENG	Frank Wintle	1	0	1	0	0	0
	HB	(England) ENG	Tommy Cheadle	14	0	14	0	0	0
	HB	(England) ENG	Albert Leake	22	4	22	4	0	0
	HB	(England) ENG	Terry Miles	5	0	5	0	0	0
	HB	(England) ENG	Derek Mountford	11	0	9	0	2	0
	HB	(England) ENG	Roy Sproson	41	1	39	1	2	0
	FW	(England) ENG	Harry Anders	3	0	3	0	0	0
	FW	(England) ENG	Colin Askey	39	5	37	5	2	0
	FW	(England) ENG	Alan Bennett	2	0	2	0	0	0
	FW	(England) ENG	John Cunliffe	33	6	31	6	2	0
	FW	(England) ENG	Cyril Done	16	9	16	9	0	0
	FW	(England) ENG	Ken Griffiths	17	1	17	1	0	0
	FW	(England) ENG	Basil Hayward	44	3	42	3	2	0
	FW	(England) ENG	Harry Poole	32	5	30	3	2	2
	FW	(England) ENG	Stan Smith	17	8	17	8	0	0
	FW	Guernsey	Billy Spurdle	23	7	21	7	2	0
	FW	(England) ENG	Stan Steele	12	3	12	3	0	0
	FW	(England) ENG	Len Stephenson	22	4	20	3	2	1
Players who featured but departed the club during the season:
	FW	(England) ENG	Eddie Baily	9	1	9	1	0	0

=== Top scorers ===
Place	Position	Nation	Name	Second Division	FA Cup	Total
1	FW	England	Cyril Done	9	0	9
2	FW	England	Stan Smith	8	0	8
3	FW	Guernsey	Billy Spurdle	7	0	7
4	FW	England	John Cunliffe	6	0	6
5	FW	England	Colin Askey	5	0	5
–	FW	England	Harry Poole	3	2	5
7	HB	England	Albert Leake	4	0	4
–	FW	England	Len Stephenson	3	1	4
9	FW	England	Stan Steele	3	0	3
–	FW	England	Basil Hayward	3	0	3
11	FW	England	Ken Griffiths	1	0	1
–	FW	England	Eddie Baily	1	0	1
–	HB	England	Roy Sproson	1	0	1
–	FB	England	Reg Potts	1	0	1
–	–	–	Own goals	2	0	2
			TOTALS	57	3	60

== Transfers ==
=== Transfers in ===
Date from	Position	Nationality	Name	From	Fee	Ref.
June 1956	GK	ENG	Leslie Wood	Barrow	'Reasonable'	
July 1956	FW	ENG	Harry Anders	Manchester City	'Substantial'	
November 1956	FW	Guernsey	Billy Spurdle	Manchester City	£4,000	

=== Transfers out ===
Date from	Position	Nationality	Name	To	Fee	Ref.
October 1956	FW	ENG	Eddie Baily	Nottingham Forest	£7,000	
May 1957	FW	ENG	Cyril Done	Winsford United	Free transfer	
May 1957	FB	ENG	Frank Wintle	Crewe Alexandra	Free transfer	
June 1957	FW	ENG	Harry Anders	Accrington Stanley	'Small'	
June 1957	FW	ENG	Len Stephenson	Oldham Athletic	£1,025	
July 1957	HB	ENG	Tommy Cheadle	Crewe Alexandra	Free transfer	
July 1957	GK	ENG	Ray King	Boston United	£2,500	
July 1957	HB	ENG	Derek Mountford	Crewe Alexandra	Released	
July 1957	FB	ENG	Reg Potts	Worcester City	Undisclosed	
July 1957	FW	ENG	Stan Smith	Crewe Alexandra	Undisclosed	
July 1957	FB	ENG	Stan Turner	Worcester City	Free transfer	
Summer 1957	FW	Guernsey	Billy Spurdle	Oldham Athletic	£1,000	
