= Ken Griffiths (footballer) =

English footballer (1930–2008)

Personal information
- Full name: Kenneth James Griffiths
- Date of birth: 2 April 1930
- Place of birth: Abbey Hulton, Stoke-on-Trent, England
- Date of death: 10 August 2008 (aged 78)
- Position: Inside forward

Youth career
- Abbey Hulton Youth Club
- Northwood Mission

Senior career*
| Years | Team | Apps | (Gls) |
| 1945–1958 | Port Vale | 179 | (52) |
| 1958–1959 | Mansfield Town | 42 | (7) |
- Stafford Rangers
- Wellington Town
- Sankeys
| 1961 | Macclesfield Town | 6 | (0) |
- Northwich Victoria
- Nantwich Town
| Total | | 227+ | (59+) |

Managerial career
- 1964: Stafford Rangers
- * Club domestic league appearances and goals

Kenneth James Griffiths (2 April 1930 – 10 August 2008) was an English footballer. An inside forward, he scored 59 goals in 221 games in the Football League.

With Port Vale between 1945 and 1958, a bright period of the club's history, he scored 56 goals in 195 appearances in league and cup competitions. He helped the club to the Third Division North title and the semi-finals of the FA Cup in 1953–54. He moved on to Mansfield Town in January 1958, before moving into non-League football with Stafford Rangers, Wellington Town, Sankeys, Macclesfield Town, Northwich Victoria, Nantwich Town, and Wolstanton United.

== Career ==
Griffiths started playing football for Abbey Hulton Youth Club and then with Basil Hayward for Northwood Mission. During World War II, he joined the Royal Air Force. He played inside-left for his unit's team.

=== Port Vale ===
He joined Port Vale as an amateur in June 1945 and signed professional forms in February 1950, making his debut under Gordon Hodgson two months later in the 1949–50 season. He scored his first goal at Vale Park on 31 March 1951 in a 4–3 win over Gillingham and finished 1950–51 with two goals in nine games. He hit eight goals in 21 games in 1951–52, rising to prominence in the latter half of the season under the tutelage of Freddie Steele. He hit 14 goals in 47 games in 1952–53, as the "Valiants" finished second in the Third Division North, one point behind Oldham Athletic.

Griffiths played in every match of the club's 1953–54 FA Cup run before missing the semi-final defeat to West Bromwich Albion at Villa Park. He failed a late fitness test due a knee injury he initially picked up in the second round victory over Southport. He bagged a hat-trick in a 6–0 demolition of Rochdale on 28 November 1953, striking 16 goals in 36 league games in 1953–54, as Vale won the Third Division North title by an eleven-point margin. He hit two goals past Tottenham Hotspur of the First Division in front of a crowd of 50,684 at White Hart Lane in the fourth round of the FA Cup in 1954–55, though Vale lost the game 4–2. Griffiths went on to finish the season with seven goals in 33 games. He suffered a decline in form after a cartilage operation at the start of the 1955–56 season, though he scored a hat-trick past Plymouth Argyle in a 3–1 home win on 25 February. He also scored past Potteries derby rivals Stoke City in a 1–1 draw at the Victoria Ground on 31 March 1956, and finished the season with seven goals in 21 appearances. He scored just once in 17 games in 1956–57, as Vale were relegated in last place of the Second Division, despite an upturn in form brought around by the arrival of new manager Norman Low. He played just three times in 1957–58. He was sold to Mansfield Town for a four-figure fee in January 1958.

=== Later career ===
Mansfield finished sixth in the Third Division North in 1957–58, and 20th in the Third Division in 1958–59, one place and five points above the relegation zone. He later played non-League football for Stafford Rangers, Wellington Town, Sankeys, Macclesfield Town, Northwich Victoria, Nantwich Town and Wolstanton United. He also became a player-coach of Michelin, player-assistant manager at Parkway, coach of Birches Head Hotel and then manager of the Staffordshire F.A. team.

== Style of play ==
Former teammate Roy Sproson said that: "he was quick and had the ability to put the ball in the net" and was "highly regarded by his fellow players" despite being an "underrated player by the [Port] Vale public".

== Personal life ==
Griffiths died in August 2008 at the age of 78. He was survived by his wife Nancy and daughter Valerie, grandchildren Andrea, Nicola, and Tracey, and five great-grandchildren. He died days apart from former teammate Selwyn Whalley.

== Career statistics ==
Appearances and goals by club, season and competition
| Club | Season | League | | | FA Cup | | Total | |
| Club | Season | Division | Apps | Goals | Apps | Goals | Apps | Goals |
|---|---|---|---|---|---|---|---|---|
| Port Vale | 1949–50 | Third Division South | 2 | 0 | 0 | 0 | 2 | 0 |
| Port Vale | 1950–51 | Third Division South | 8 | 2 | 1 | 0 | 9 | 2 |
| Port Vale | 1951–52 | Third Division South | 20 | 8 | 1 | 0 | 21 | 8 |
| Port Vale | 1952–53 | Third Division North | 44 | 13 | 2 | 1 | 46 | 14 |
| Port Vale | 1953–54 | Third Division North | 36 | 16 | 7 | 1 | 43 | 17 |
| Port Vale | 1954–55 | Second Division | 30 | 5 | 3 | 2 | 33 | 7 |
| Port Vale | 1955–56 | Second Division | 19 | 7 | 2 | 0 | 21 | 7 |
| Port Vale | 1956–57 | Second Division | 17 | 1 | 0 | 0 | 17 | 1 |
| Port Vale | 1957–58 | Third Division South | 3 | 0 | 0 | 0 | 3 | 0 |
| Port Vale | Total | | 179 | 52 | 16 | 4 | 195 | 56 |
| Mansfield Town | 1957–58 | Third Division North | 14 | 4 | 0 | 0 | 14 | 4 |
| Mansfield Town | 1958–59 | Third Division | 28 | 3 | 1 | 0 | 29 | 3 |
| Mansfield Town | Total | | 42 | 7 | 1 | 0 | 43 | 7 |
| Macclesfield Town | 1960–61 | Cheshire County League | 6 | 0 | 0 | 0 | 6 | 0 |
| Career total | | | 227 | 59 | 17 | 4 | 244 | 63 |

== Honours ==
Port Vale

- Football League Third Division North: 1953–54
