= Roy Brien =

English footballer

Personal information
- Full name: William Roy Brien
- Date of birth: 11 November 1930
- Place of birth: Stoke-on-Trent, England
- Date of death: 27 January 1987 (aged 56)
- Place of death: Rochdale, England
- Position: Half-back

Senior career*
Years	Team	Apps	(Gls)
1951–1955	Port Vale	1	(0)
Total		1	(0)
- * Club domestic league appearances and goals

William Roy Brien (11 November 1930 – 27 January 1987) was an English footballer who played one game for Port Vale in the Football League on 17 April 1954.

== Career ==
Brien joined Port Vale in May 1951 and made his debut at half-back in a goalless draw with Rochdale at Spotland on 17 April 1954. The point gained in this game was enough to clinch the Third Division North title that season, but Brien was not selected again before being released at the end of the following season.

== Career statistics ==
Appearances and goals by club, season and competition
Club	Season	League			FA Cup		Total	
Club	Season	Division	Apps	Goals	Apps	Goals	Apps	Goals
Port Vale	1953–54	Third Division North	1	0	0	0	1	0
Total			1	0	0	0	1	0

== Honours ==
Port Vale

- Football League Third Division North: 1953–54
