= John Cunliffe (footballer, born 1930) =

English footballer (1930–1975)

Personal information
- Full name: John Cunliffe
- Date of birth: 4 February 1930
- Place of birth: Wigan, England
- Date of death: 15 November 1975 (aged 45)
- Place of death: Tunstall, Stoke-on-Trent, England
- Height: 5 ft 5 in (1.65 m)
- Position: Left winger

Senior career*
| Years | Team | Apps | (Gls) |
| 1950–1959 | Port Vale | 283 | (52) |
| 1959–1960 | Stoke City | 25 | (3) |
| 1960–1963 | Macclesfield Town | 98 | (34) |
- Stafford Rangers
- Buxton
| Total | | 406+ | (89+) |
- * Club domestic league appearances and goals

John Cunliffe (4 February 1930 – 15 November 1975) was an English footballer who played on the left wing. He made 309 appearances in the Football League, scoring 55 goals.

Signed to Port Vale for almost the whole of the 1950s, he was on the wing for one of the most exciting periods of the club's history, with Vale Park still freshly built. He helped the club to the Third Division North title in 1953–54 and the Fourth Division title in 1958–59. In September 1959, he crossed the city to play for one season with Stoke City. He then became a non-League player with Macclesfield Town, Stafford Rangers and Buxton.

== Career ==
Cunliffe joined Gordon Hodgson's Port Vale in December 1950, and went on to feature in eight Third Division South games in 1950–51. He scored his first goal in the Football League on 30 April 1951, in a 2–0 win over Exeter City at Vale Park. He played 11 games in 1951–52 and 19 games in 1952–53, as new boss Freddie Steele took the "Valiants" to second in the Third Division North.

Vale went on to win the Third Division North title and reach the semi-finals of the FA Cup in 1953–54; Cunliffe was a mainstay in the team, bagging nine goals in 50 appearances. In the fifth round of the competition, he was said to have outplayed Blackpool's Stanley Matthews. He scored five goals in 43 games in 1954–55, including goals in both FA Cup encounters with West Ham United. He hit seven goals in 41 games in 1955–56 and six goals in 33 games in 1956–57. However, the club suffered relegation out of the Second Division under new manager Norman Low. He scored four goals in 45 matches in the 1957–58 season, as Vale registered a 15th-place finish in the Third Division South. Cunliffe missed only one match of the Fourth Division winning 1958–59 season, and found the net 15 times.

He transferred to rivals Stoke City, along with £2,000, in exchange for Peter Ford and Harry Oscroft in September 1959. He scored three goals in 25 Second Division games for the "Potters" in 1959–60, before he was allowed to leave the Victoria Ground by manager Frank Taylor. He signed with Macclesfield Town, scoring 34 goals in 98 Cheshire County League games for Frank Bowyer's "Silkmen". He later played for Stafford Rangers and Buxton.

== Style of play ==
A skilled left winger adept at taking on defenders, his finishing was poor.

== Personal life ==
Cunliffe was engaged to Elsie Elizabeth Eardley.

== Career statistics ==
Appearances and goals by club, season and competition
| Club | Season | League | | | FA Cup | | Other | | Total | |
| Club | Season | Division | Apps | Goals | Apps | Goals | Apps | Goals | Apps | Goals |
|---|---|---|---|---|---|---|---|---|---|---|
| Port Vale | 1950–51 | Third Division South | 8 | 1 | 0 | 0 | — | | 8 | 1 |
| Port Vale | 1951–52 | Third Division South | 11 | 2 | 0 | 0 | — | | 11 | 2 |
| Port Vale | 1952–53 | Third Division North | 19 | 4 | 0 | 0 | — | | 19 | 4 |
| Port Vale | 1953–54 | Third Division North | 42 | 8 | 8 | 1 | — | | 50 | 9 |
| Port Vale | 1954–55 | Second Division | 40 | 5 | 3 | 2 | — | | 43 | 7 |
| Port Vale | 1955–56 | Second Division | 39 | 7 | 2 | 0 | — | | 41 | 7 |
| Port Vale | 1956–57 | Second Division | 31 | 6 | 2 | 0 | — | | 33 | 6 |
| Port Vale | 1957–58 | Third Division South | 42 | 4 | 3 | 0 | — | | 45 | 4 |
| Port Vale | 1958–59 | Fourth Division | 45 | 15 | 1 | 0 | — | | 46 | 15 |
| Port Vale | 1959–60 | Third Division | 6 | 0 | 0 | 0 | — | | 6 | 0 |
| Port Vale | Total | | 283 | 52 | 19 | 3 | 0 | 0 | 302 | 55 |
| Stoke City | 1959–60 | Second Division | 25 | 3 | 2 | 0 | — | | 27 | 3 |
| Macclesfield Town | 1960–61 | Cheshire County League | 34 | 12 | 6 | 3 | 2 | 0 | 42 | 15 |
| Macclesfield Town | 1961–62 | Cheshire County League | 32 | 13 | 2 | 2 | 7 | 3 | 41 | 18 |
| Macclesfield Town | 1962–63 | Cheshire County League | 32 | 9 | 2 | 0 | 4 | 0 | 38 | 9 |
| Macclesfield Town | Total | | 98 | 34 | 10 | 5 | 13 | 3 | 121 | 42 |
| Career total | | | 406 | 89 | 31 | 8 | 13 | 3 | 450 | 100 |

== Honours ==
Port Vale

- Football League Third Division North: 1953–54
- Football League Fourth Division: 1958–59
