= Mike Moran (footballer) =

English footballer (1935–1964)

Personal information
- Full name: Michael Edward Moran
- Date of birth: 26 December 1935
- Place of birth: Leek, Staffordshire, England
- Date of death: 10 February 1964 (aged 28)
- Place of death: Warwick, England
- Position: Inside forward

Senior career*
Years	Team	Apps	(Gls)
1954–1957	Port Vale	0	(0)
1957–1958	Crewe Alexandra	14	(3)
Total		14	(3)
- * Club domestic league appearances and goals

Michael Edward Moran (26 December 1935 – 10 February 1964) was an English professional footballer who played as an inside forward. He died in hospital in Warwick, on 10 February 1964, aged 28.

== Career statistics ==
Appearances and goals by club, season and competition
Club	Season	League			FA Cup		Total	
Club	Season	Division	Apps	Goals	Apps	Goals	Apps	Goals
Port Vale	1954–55	Second Division	0	0	0	0	0	0
Crewe Alexandra	1957–58	Third Division North	14	3	1	0	15	3
Career total			14	3	1	0	15	3
