= Ian Brydon =

Scottish footballer

Personal information
- Full name: Ian Forrest Brydon
- Date of birth: 22 March 1927
- Place of birth: Edinburgh, Scotland
- Date of death: 22 July 1973 (aged 46)
- Place of death: Italy
- Position: Centre forward

Senior career*
Years	Team	Apps	(Gls)
1947–1948	Leith Athletic	1	(0)
1948–1950	Tranent	?	(?)
1948–1949	St Johnstone	55	(26)
1953	Darlington	1	(0)
1953–1955	Accrington Stanley	27	(19)
1955–1956	Bradford Park Avenue	12	(3)
1956–1957	Netherfield	?	(?)
Total		96	(48)
- * Club domestic league appearances and goals

Ian Forrest Brydon (22 March 1927 – 22 July 1973) was a Scottish professional footballer who played as a centre forward in the Football League and the Scottish Football League.
