= Tommy McGuigan (footballer) =

English football player (1922–1997)

Personal information
- Full name: Thomas McGuigan
- Date of birth: 22 November 1922
- Place of birth: Whitburn, West Lothian, Scotland
- Date of death: 14 December 1997 (aged 75)
- Place of death: Hartlepool, England
- Position: Inside forward

Senior career*
Years	Team	Apps	(Gls)
1946–1950	Ayr United	74	(21)
1950–1958	Hartlepools United	325	(79)
- Spennymoor United
- * Club domestic league appearances and goals

Thomas McGuigan (22 November 1922 – 14 December 1997) was a Scottish footballer who played for Ayr United, Hartlepools United and Spennymoor United.

== Playing career ==
McGuigan began his playing career in 1922 with Ayr United. He played 74 times for Ayr, scoring 21 times.

In 1950, McGuigan moved to English side Hartlepools United. McGuigan played 325 times for the club and was in the top 10 all time appearances list for Pools, until 2021 when he his tally was overtaken by Gary Liddle. He scored 79 times for Hartlepools including hat tricks against Halifax Town and Stockport County. As of 2022, McGuigan remains in the top 10 of the all time top goal scorers list for Hartlepool. His service to the club earned him a benefit game against Newcastle United in 1956 which Hartlepools won 6–3.

After leaving Hartlepools, McGuigan played for Spennymoor United.

As part of Hartlepool's centenary year in 2008, McGuigan was one of seven players to have a street named after them on a new housing development in the town.

In 2017, McGuigan was nominated as a part of a vote for Hartlepool United's greatest XI by The Northern Echo. The paper described him as a "hard-working forward" who was "full of honest endeavour and graft".

== Personal life ==
McGuigan died in Hartlepool on 14 December 1997, aged 75. He is the grandfather of Premier League referee Tony Harrington. And is the great grandfather of Evan Allison.
