= 1952–53 Manchester City F.C. season =

English football club season

Manchester City
1952–53 season
- Manager: Les McDowall
- Stadium: Maine Road
- First Division: 20th
- FA Cup: Fourth Round
- Top goalscorer: League: Billy Spurdle and Johnny Williamson (11); All: Johnny Hart (13)
- Highest home attendance: 56,140 vs Manchester United; 30 August 1952
- Lowest home attendance: 13,562 vs Stoke City; 20 December 1952

The 1952–53 season was Manchester City's 51st season of competitive football and 36th season in the top division of English football. In addition to the First Division, the club competed in the FA Cup.

== First Division ==
=== League table ===
Pos	Team	Pld	W	D	L	GF	GA	GAv	Pts	Relegation
18	Sheffield Wednesday	42	12	11	19	62	72	0.861	35	
19	Chelsea	42	12	11	19	56	66	0.848	35	
20	Manchester City	42	14	7	21	72	87	0.828	35	
21	Stoke City (R)	42	12	10	20	53	66	0.803	34	Relegation to the Second Division
22	Derby County (R)	42	11	10	21	59	74	0.797	32	Relegation to the Second Division

Source: World Football
Rules for classification: 1) Points; 2) Goal average; 3) Goals scored
(R) Relegated

=== Results summary ===
Overall								Home						Away					
Pld	W	D	L	GF	GA	GAv	Pts	W	D	L	GF	GA	Pts	W	D	L	GF	GA	Pts
42	14	7	21	72	87	0.828	35	12	2	7	45	28	26	2	5	14	27	59	9

=== Reports ===
Date	Opponents	H / A	Venue	Result F – A	Scorers	Attendance
23 August 1952	Stoke City	A	Victoria Ground	1 – 2	Smith	37,644
27 August 1952	Tottenham Hotspur	H	Maine Road	0 – 1		33,521
30 August 1952	Manchester United	H	Maine Road	2 – 1	Clarke, Broadis	56,140
1 September 1952	Tottenham Hotspur	A	White Hart Lane	3 – 3	Sowden (2), Meadows	40,870
6 September 1952	Liverpool	H	Maine Road	0 – 2		42,965
8 September 1952	Burnley	A	Turf Moor	1 - 2	Meadows	27,083
13 September 1952	Middlesbrough	A	Ayresome Park	4 – 5	Revie (2), Broadis, Meadows	36,000
17 September 1952	Burnley	H	Maine Road	0 – 0		24,884
20 September 1952	West Bromwich Albion	H	Maine Road	0 – 1		33,043
27 September 1952	Newcastle United	A	St James’ Park	0 – 2		48,110
4 October 1952	Cardiff City	H	Maine Road	2 – 2	Revie, Branagan	35,000
11 October 1952	Portsmouth	A	Fratton Park	1 - 2	Williamson	33,644
18 October 1952	Bolton Wanderers	H	Maine Road	1 – 2	Revie	42,270
25 October 1952	Aston Villa	A	Villa Park	0 – 0		30,000
1 November 1952	Sunderland	H	Maine Road	2 – 5	Hart, Williamson	33,121
8 November 1952	Wolverhampton Wanderers	A	Molineux Stadium	3 – 7	Williamson (2), Davies	33,832
15 November 1952	Charlton Athletic	H	Maine Road	5 – 1	Meadows (3), Williamson, Clarke	23,362
22 November 1952	Arsenal	A	Highbury	1 – 3	Meadows	39,161
29 November 1952	Derby County	H	Maine Road	1 – 0	Hart	22,918
6 December 1952	Blackpool	A	Maine Road	1 – 4	Williamson	19,469
13 December 1952	Chelsea	H	Maine Road	4 – 0	Meadows, Hart, Clarke, (og)	20,633
20 December 1952	Stoke City	H	Maine Road	2 – 1	Williamson, Hart	13,563
26 December 1952	Preston North End	A	Deepdale	2 – 6	Hart (2)	38,000
3 January 1953	Manchester United	A	Old Trafford	1 – 1	Broadis	47,883
17 January 1953	Liverpool	A	Anfield	1 – 0	Hart	41,191
24 January 1953	Middlesbrough	H	Maine Road	5 – 1	Spurdle (3), Revie, Williamson	26,715
7 February 1953	West Bromwich Albion	A	The Hawthorns	1 – 2	Revie	25,000
14 February 1953	Newcastle United	H	Maine Road	2 – 1	Meadows, Phoenix	25,000
21 February 1953	Cardiff City	A	Ninian Park	0 – 6		28,000
28 February 1953	Portsmouth	H	Maine Road	2 - 1	Meadows, Cunliffe	38,736
7 March 1953	Bolton Wanderers	A	Burnden Park	0 – 1		36,405
14 March 1953	Aston Villa	H	Maine Road	4 – 1	Spurdle (3), Anders	32,566
21 March 1953	Sunderland	A	Roker Park	3 – 3	Broadis (2), Williamson	26,270
28 March 1953	Wolverhampton Wanderers	H	Maine Road	3 – 1	Spurdle, Whitfield, McCourt	27,127
3 April 1953	Sheffield Wednesday	H	Maine Road	3 – 1	Broadis, Whitfield, Cunliffe	55,485
4 April 1953	Charlton Athletic	A	The Valley	2 – 1	Hart, McCourt	26,242
6 April 1953	Sheffield Wednesday	A	Hillsborough Stadium	1 – 1	Hart	43,520
11 April 1953	Arsenal	H	Maine Road	2 – 4	Spurdle (2)	53,418
18 April 1953	Derby County	A	Baseball Ground	0 – 5		15,618
22 April 1953	Preston North End	H	Maine Road	0 – 2		45,000
25 April 1953	Blackpool	H	Maine Road	5 – 0	Spurdle (2), McCourt, Cunliffe, Williamson	38,507
29 April 1953	Chelsea	A	Stamford Bridge	1 – 3	Williamson	48,594

== FA Cup ==
=== Results ===
Date	Round	Opponents	H / A	Venue	Result F – A	Scorers	Attendance
10 January 1953	Third Round	Swindon Town	H	Maine Road	7 - 0	Hart (4), Williamson, Cunliffe, Broadis	28,953
16 January 1953	Fourth Round	Luton Town	H	Maine Road	1 - 1	Broadis	38,411
4 February 1953	Fourth Round Replay	Luton Town	A	Kenilworth Road	1 - 5	Spurdle	21,911
