= Michael Moran (Tuam) =

Michael Moran (4 December 1890 – 24 November 1920) was commandant of the Tuam Battalion of the Irish Republican Army (IRA) during the Irish War of Independence. He was shot dead in controversial circumstances, by members of the Auxiliary Division, on 24 November 1920.

== Early life ==
A native of Carramoneen, Tuam, County Galway, Moran was born in 1890 or 1891. In the aftermath of the 1916 Easter Rising, he became involved with Sinn Féin and the Irish Volunteers. He participated locally in the 1918 Anti-Conscription Campaign.

== Irish War of Independence ==
Initially involved in fundraising to buy arms, as of 1919 he was in command of the Tuam Battalion of the Irish Volunteers (by then more commonly known as the IRA). During the Irish War of Independence, Moran's battalion were involved in a number of engagements with the Royal Irish Constabulary (RIC) and Auxiliary Division, including an ambush at Gallagh in which several RIC constables were killed.

Suspected of involvement in several IRA raids in the area, Moran was arrested in October 1920 and held in Galway Gaol for six weeks before being released without charge. He was subsequently rearrested and on 24 November 1920, while being transferred the short distance from Eglinton Street RIC barracks in Galway to a detention camp on Earl's Island, was shot by the members of the Auxiliary Division reportedly guarding him. While an official enquiry concluded that he was "shot while attempting to escape custody", a number of sources describe Moran's death as an example of the type of extrajudicial killing which was prevalent at the time.

== See also ==
- Frank Shawe-Taylor
- Michael Griffin (Irish priest)
