= Billy Burnett =

English footballer

Personal information
- Full name: William John Burnett
- Date of birth: 1 March 1926
- Place of birth: Pelaw, England
- Date of death: 1988 (aged 61–62)
- Position: Winger

Senior career*
Years	Team	Apps	(Gls)
1945–1946	Wardley Colliery Welfare		
1946–1948	Grimsby Town	10	(0)
1948–1954	Hartlepool United	194	(17)
- * Club domestic league appearances and goals

William John Burnett (1 March 1926 – 1988) was an English professional footballer who played as a winger.
