= Albert Leake =

English footballer (1930–1999)

Personal information
- Full name: Albert George Leake
- Date of birth: 17 April 1930
- Place of birth: Smallthorne, Staffordshire, England
- Date of death: 24 July 1999 (aged 69)
- Place of death: Norton le Moors, Staffordshire, England
- Position: Half-back

Youth career
- Moorland Road Youth Club
- RAF
- Stoke City

Senior career*
Years	Team	Apps	(Gls)
1950–1961	Port Vale	269	(34)
1961–1967	Macclesfield Town	208	(9)
Total		477	(43)

International career
	England Youth	6	(0)

Managerial career
- 1963–1967: Macclesfield Town
- * Club domestic league appearances and goals

Albert George Leake (17 April 1930 – 24 July 1999) was an English footballer who played as a half-back.

He spent the entire 1950s with Port Vale, as the club enjoyed an exciting period of their history. He helped the "Valiants" to the Third Division North title in 1953–54 and Fourth Division title in 1958–59. After a total of 43 goals in 293 league and cup games, he left the club in 1961 for non-League Macclesfield Town, a club he served as manager from 1963 to 1967. He guided the club to a Cheshire County League and Cheshire Senior Cup double in 1963–64.

He also played cricket for Staffordshire in the Minor Counties Cricket Championship between 1955 and 1960. He was a right-handed batsman who fielded as a wicket-keeper.

== Career ==
Leake played for Stoke City and the RAF before joining Port Vale from Stoke in February 1950. He represented England Youth, winning six caps. He made his professional debut on 24 March 1951, in a 3–1 win over Bristol City at Ashton Gate. Signed and given his debut by Gordon Hodgson, the manager's early death meant that Leake had to win a regular first-team place under new boss Freddie Steele. He played eight Third Division South games in 1951–52, scoring his first senior goal on 1 September, in a 1–1 draw with Watford at Vale Park.

He became a first-team regular from December 1952, and scored four goals in 26 games in 1952–53, as the "Valiants" finished as runners-up of the Third Division North. He hit 20 goals in 48 appearances in 1953–54, as Vale won the Third Division North title and reached the semi-finals of the FA Cup. He was the scorer of the FA Cup semi-final goal against West Bromwich Albion in Vale's 2–1 defeat and also had an equaliser disallowed for offside. He had previously scored five of Vale's six goals from the third round onwards that were enough to defeat Queens Park Rangers, Cardiff City, Blackpool, and Leyton Orient.

Leake scored six goals in 30 games in 1954–55, as Vale retained their Second Division status. He hit four goals in 38 games in 1955–56, before losing his first-team place to Harry Poole. He hit four goals in 22 appearances in 1956–57, as Vale suffered relegation despite the best efforts of new boss Norman Low. He featured 34 times in 1957–58, and was an ever-present in the 1958–59 season as the club won the Fourth Division title. He scored three goals in 39 games in 1959–60; however, he lost his first-team place in April 1960. He did not play a Third Division game in 1960–61, and was instead transferred to Macclesfield Town in January 1961. Two years later, he was appointed as Macclesfield's new manager, and using firm discipline, he led the club to the Cheshire County League and Cheshire Senior Cup double in 1963–64. They went on to finish second in 1964–65, third in 1965–66, and fifth in 1966–67. Upon losing his position he joined Goldenhill Y. & A. as a player. He worked as a school attendance officer between 1966 and 1995. He died at Norton le Moors in Staffordshire on 24 July 1999.

== Career statistics ==
Appearances and goals by club, season and competition
Club	Season	League			FA Cup		Other		Total	
Club	Season	Division	Apps	Goals	Apps	Goals	Apps	Goals	Apps	Goals
Port Vale	1950–51	Third Division South	1	0	0	0	—		1	0
Port Vale	1951–52	Third Division South	8	2	0	0	—		8	2
Port Vale	1952–53	Third Division North	24	4	1	0	—		25	8
Port Vale	1953–54	Third Division North	40	13	8	7	—		48	20
Port Vale	1954–55	Second Division	27	5	3	1	—		30	6
Port Vale	1955–56	Second Division	36	4	2	0	—		38	4
Port Vale	1956–57	Second Division	22	4	0	0	—		22	4
Port Vale	1957–58	Third Division South	32	0	2	0	—		34	0
Port Vale	1958–59	Fourth Division	46	0	1	0	—		47	0
Port Vale	1959–60	Third Division	33	2	5	1	—		38	3
Port Vale	1960–61	Third Division	0	0	0	0	0	0	0	0
Port Vale	Total		269	34	22	9	0	0	291	43
Macclesfield Town	1960–61	Cheshire County League	20	2	0	0	1	0	21	2
Macclesfield Town	1961–62	Cheshire County League	38	1	1	0	7	0	46	1
Macclesfield Town	1962–63	Cheshire County League	41	1	2	0	5	0	48	1
Macclesfield Town	1963–64	Cheshire County League	40	2	5	0	11	0	56	2
Macclesfield Town	1964–65	Cheshire County League	35	1	5	0	4	0	44	1
Macclesfield Town	1965–66	Cheshire County League	26	0	2	0	5	0	33	0
Macclesfield Town	1966–67	Cheshire County League	8	2	4	0	2	0	14	2
Macclesfield Town	Total		208	9	19	0	35	0	262	9
Career total			477	43	41	9	35	0	553	52

== Honours ==
Port Vale

- Football League Third Division North: 1953–54
- Football League Fourth Division: 1958–59

Macclesfield Town

- Cheshire County League: 1963–64
- Cheshire Senior Cup: 1964
- Cheshire County League runner-up: 1964–65
- Cheshire County Challenge Cup: 1967
