= 1954–55 Port Vale F.C. season =

Port Vale F.C.
1954–55 season
- Chairman: Fred Burgess
- Manager: Freddie Steele
- Stadium: Vale Park
- Football League Second Division: 17th (35 points)
- FA Cup: Fourth Round (eliminated by Tottenham Hotspur)
- Top goalscorer: League: Cyril Done (13); All: Cyril Done (13)
- Highest home attendance: 40,066 vs. Stoke City, 25 April 1955
- Lowest home attendance: 11,963 vs. West Ham United, 10 January 1955
- Average home league attendance: 20,869
- Biggest win: 4–0 vs. Fulham, 27 December 1954
- Biggest defeat: 1–7 vs. Swansea Town, 16 September 1954
Home colours

The 1954–55 season was Port Vale's 43rd season of football in the English Football League and their first season (thirtieth overall) back in the Second Division following their promotion from the Third Division North. Under manager Freddie Steele and chairman Fred Burgess, the club adapted to life in the second tier, finishing in 17th place with 35 points from 42 league matches. Despite a strong home record, Vale struggled on the road, winning just three away games throughout the season.

In the FA Cup, Vale advanced to the Fourth Round, where they were eliminated by Tottenham Hotspur. The club's top scorer was Cyril Done, who netted 13 goals during the season. Attendance at Vale Park was impressive, with an average crowd of 20,869, including a club record 40,066 spectators for the derby against Potteries derby rivals Stoke City on 25 April 1955, the first league meeting between the two clubs since 1932–33.

This season laid the groundwork for future success, as the club continued to build upon the foundation established by Steele's "Iron Curtain" defence and the solid squad that had achieved promotion the previous year.

== Overview ==
=== Second Division ===
The pre-season saw the players taken on a short outing to Ireland for their exploits the previous season. No major signings took place, and no players of note departed in the summer. Chairman Fred Burgess boasted of his team's loyalty.

The season opened with a 1–0 defeat at The Memorial Stadium to Bristol Rovers, though the team put in 'an encouraging display'. Two days later Vale Park welcomed a crowd of 26,805 for a 1–1 draw with Notts County. When they travelled to the Victoria Ground on 4 September, Stoke City had a 100% win record, but 46,777 locals witnessed a goalless draw between the Potteries clubs. Twelve days later, Vale travelled to Vetch Field, where they opened the scoring only to lose 7–1 to Swansea Town, a team they had beaten 1–0 just ten days earlier. This occurred because Tommy Cheadle and Stan Turner had to leave the game before half-time with injuries. The heavy defeat seemed to have destroyed the reputation of 'the Steele Curtain', as the team would have to wait another 14 matches before holding a clean sheet. During this time, manager Freddie Steele switched tactics from a defensive set-up to 'a semi-continental style' in the hunt for goals. Five straight losses followed, as the players struggled to adapt. Also lost was their record of 42 home games without a loss when on 18 September 1954, Blackburn Rovers claimed a 3–0 victory. Basil Hayward dropped from the first XI, they failed to beat strugglers Ipswich Town as the club hovered above the relegation zone. A 3–2 win over Nottingham Forest at the City Ground sustained them until two home wins came in late-December. They had to do without Ken Griffiths, however, who sustained an ankle injury. On 27 November, Vale crashed to a 7–2 defeat at Birmingham City after Tommy Cheadle was stretchered off after half an hour with a fractured rib. In December, Cyril Done, an experienced striker, was signed from Tranmere Rovers for a four-figure fee. He helped to inspire a 4–0 victory over Fulham on 27 December.

On 5 February, strugglers Derby County thrashed the Vale 6–1 at the Baseball Ground despite "a spectacular solo goal" from Done. However, Vale's poor away record failed to deter a strong contingent of Vale fans from following the club around the country dressed in fancy dress. The following month, aggressive young forward Len Stephenson was signed from Blackpool. He impressed with his performances, though he proved more effective as a winger than in the much-needed centre-forward role. Three defeats left the Vale in a relegation dogfight, but seven points from the first five games in April proved very useful. On 8 April, Done put four past his former club Liverpool in a 4–3 win as Vale came from 3–1 down to win the match from the penalty spot. Three days later he scored a penalty at Anfield to earn a 1–1 draw. On 25 April, more than 40,000 turned up to Vale Park to witness the "Potters" claim a 1–0 victory. Vale won their final two games, including a 1–0 win over Rotherham United that denied the "Millers" a place in the top flight. Barnsley manager Andy Smailes bemaoned the state of the Vale Park pitch, saying "it was just like playing on Blackpool beach!".

They finished in 17th place, seven points clear of relegation but 19 short of promotion. With 48 goals, only Hull City scored fewer goals. Cyril Done was the only consistent scorer and was the top scorer for both Vale and Tranmere, having scored twice as many league goals as the next-highest scorer at both clubs.

=== Finances ===
On the financial side, a scant profit of £141 was recorded despite a club-record average home attendance of 20,708. The £6,850 spent to bolster the forward line had swallowed up most of the profits. The Supporters' Club therefore announced it would raise £5,000 – £1,500 of which would go towards the terracing on the Bycars End. Reserve team players Mick Hulligan and Len Barber were allowed to leave for Northwich Victoria on free transfers.

=== FA Cup ===
In the FA Cup, the "Valiants" drew 2–2 with West Ham United at Upton Park after going two goals behind. Vale won the replay 3–1 despite West Ham's protestations over the state of the pitch. Vale were drawn against First Division Tottenham Hotspur at White Hart Lane in the fourth round. A crowd of 50,684 saw an exciting game in which four "Spurs" goals wiped out a Ken Griffiths brace.

== Results ==
=== Football League Second Division ===
==== League table ====
Pos	Team	Pld	W	D	L	GF	GA	GAv	Pts	Qualification or relegation
1	Birmingham City (C, P)	42	22	10	10	92	47	1.957	54	Inter-Cities Fairs Cup group stage and promotion to the First Division
2	Luton Town (P)	42	23	8	11	88	53	1.660	54	Promotion to the First Division
3	Rotherham United	42	25	4	13	94	64	1.469	54	
4	Leeds United	42	23	7	12	70	53	1.321	53	
5	Stoke City	42	21	10	11	69	46	1.500	52	
6	Blackburn Rovers	42	22	6	14	114	79	1.443	50	
7	Notts County	42	21	6	15	74	71	1.042	48	
8	West Ham United	42	18	10	14	74	70	1.057	46	
9	Bristol Rovers	42	19	7	16	75	70	1.071	45	
10	Swansea Town	42	17	9	16	86	83	1.036	43	
11	Liverpool	42	16	10	16	92	96	0.958	42	
12	Middlesbrough	42	18	6	18	73	82	0.890	42	
13	Bury	42	15	11	16	77	72	1.069	41	
14	Fulham	42	14	11	17	76	79	0.962	39	
15	Nottingham Forest	42	16	7	19	58	62	0.935	39	
16	Lincoln City	42	13	10	19	68	79	0.861	36	
17	Port Vale	42	12	11	19	48	71	0.676	35	
18	Doncaster Rovers	42	14	7	21	58	95	0.611	35	
19	Hull City	42	12	10	20	44	69	0.638	34	
20	Plymouth Argyle	42	12	7	23	57	82	0.695	31	
21	Ipswich Town (R)	42	11	6	25	57	92	0.620	28	Relegation to the Third Division South
22	Derby County (R)	42	7	9	26	53	82	0.646	23	Relegation to the Third Division North

Rules for classification: 1) Points; 2) Goal average; 3) Goals scored
(C) Champions; (P) Promoted; (R) Relegated

==== Results by matchday ====
Round	1	2	3	4	5	6	7	8	9	10	11	12	13	14	15	16	17	18	19	20	21	22	23	24	25	26	27	28	29	30	31	32	33	34	35	36	37	38	39	40	41	42
Ground	A	H	H	A	A	H	A	H	A	A	H	H	A	H	A	H	A	H	A	H	A	H	A	H	A	H	A	H	A	H	A	H	A	H	H	A	A	H	A	H	H	A
Result	L	D	W	D	D	W	L	W	L	L	L	L	L	D	W	L	D	D	L	D	L	W	L	W	D	D	L	D	L	W	L	L	L	W	W	L	D	W	L	L	W	W
Position	20	15	10	10	12	6	14	13	16	16	18	18	18	17	17	17	18	17	19	19	19	19	19	18	18	18	18	19	19	19	19	20	20	20	19	19	19	19	19	19	19	17
Points	0	1	3	4	5	7	7	9	9	9	9	9	9	10	12	12	13	14	14	15	15	17	17	19	20	21	21	22	22	24	24	24	24	26	28	28	29	31	31	31	33	35

Source: Statto
A = Away; H = Home; W = Win; D = Draw; L = Loss

==== Matches ====
21 August 1954 1	Bristol Rovers	1–0	Port Vale	Bristol
		Report		Stadium: Eastville Stadium; Attendance: 32,367

23 August 1954 2	Port Vale	1–1	Notts County	Burslem
	Sproson	Report		Stadium: Vale Park; Attendance: 26,805

28 August 1954 3	Port Vale	1–0	Plymouth Argyle	Burslem
	Leake	Report		Stadium: Vale Park; Attendance: 25,038

2 September 1954 4	Notts County	1–1	Port Vale	Nottingham
		Report	Cunliffe	Stadium: Meadow Lane; Attendance: 17,723

4 September 1954 5	Stoke City	0–0	Port Vale	Stoke-upon-Trent
		Report		Stadium: Victoria Ground; Attendance: 46,777

6 September 1954 6	Port Vale	1–0	Swansea Town	Burslem
	Hayward	Report		Stadium: Vale Park; Attendance: 18,603

16 September 1954 7	Swansea Town	7–1	Port Vale	Swansea
		Report	Leake	Stadium: Vetch Field; Attendance: 22,265

18 September 1954 8	Port Vale	3–0	Derby County	Burslem
	Askey; Cunliffe; Griffiths	Report		Stadium: Vale Park; Attendance: 22,777

25 September 1954 9	West Ham United	2–0	Port Vale	Upton Park, London
	Dick; Sexton	Report		Stadium: Boleyn Ground; Attendance: 25,155

27 September 1954 10	Doncaster Rovers	1–0	Port Vale	Doncaster
		Report		Stadium: Belle Vue; Attendance: 12,818

2 October 1954 11	Port Vale	0–3	Blackburn Rovers	Burslem
		Report		Stadium: Vale Park; Attendance: 25,619

9 October 1954 12	Port Vale	1–3	Lincoln City	Burslem
	Cunliffe	Report		Stadium: Vale Park; Attendance: 19,724

16 October 1954 13	Hull City	2–1	Port Vale	Kingston upon Hull
15:00 BST	Dryburgh 8'; Ackerman 59'	Report	Hayward	Stadium: Boothferry Park; Attendance: 23,892

23 October 1954 14	Port Vale	3–3	Ipswich Town	Burslem
	Leake; Hayward; Smith	Report		Stadium: Vale Park; Attendance: 14,532

30 October 1954 15	Nottingham Forest	2–3	Port Vale	West Bridgford
15:00 GMT	Small 56'; Kelly 76'	Report	Leake; Hayward; Cunliffe	Stadium: City Ground; Attendance: 15,654; Referee: F Cowen

6 November 1954 16	Port Vale	0–1	Leeds United	Burslem
		Report	Nightingale	Stadium: Vale Park; Attendance: 16,062

13 November 1954 17	Bury	2–2	Port Vale	Bury, Greater Manchester
	Law; Kelly	Report	Smith; Hayward	Stadium: Gigg Lane; Attendance: 12,917; Referee: J Mitchell

20 November 1954 18	Port Vale	1–1	Middlesbrough	Burslem
	Askey	Report	Wayman	Stadium: Vale Park; Attendance: 16,753

27 November 1954 19	Birmingham City	7–2	Port Vale	Birmingham
	Brown; Murphy; Kinsey; Govan	Report	Hayward; Mullard (pen.)	Stadium: St Andrew's; Attendance: 16,352

4 December 1954 20	Port Vale	1–1	Luton Town	Burslem
	(og.)	Report		Stadium: Vale Park; Attendance: 14,052

11 December 1954 21	Rotherham United	3–0	Port Vale	Rotherham
		Report		Stadium: Millmoor; Attendance: 12,850

18 December 1954 22	Port Vale	1–0	Bristol Rovers	Burslem
	Griffiths	Report		Stadium: Vale Park; Attendance: 16,434

25 December 1954 23	Fulham	3–1	Port Vale	Fulham, West London
		Report	Askey	Stadium: Craven Cottage; Attendance: 17,519

27 December 1954 24	Port Vale	4–0	Fulham	Burslem
	Smith; Leake; Cunliffe	Report		Stadium: Vale Park; Attendance: 29,415

1 January 1955 25	Plymouth Argyle	0–0	Port Vale	Plymouth
		Report		Stadium: Home Park; Attendance: 14,371

22 January 1955 26	Port Vale	1–1	Doncaster Rovers	Burslem
	Done	Report		Stadium: Vale Park; Attendance: 16,323

5 February 1955 27	Derby County	6–1	Port Vale	Derby
	Parry; Dunn; Buchanan; Imlach own goal	Report	Done	Stadium: Baseball Ground; Attendance: 19,882

12 February 1955 28	Port Vale	1–1	West Ham United	Burslem
	Done	Report	Hooper	Stadium: Vale Park; Attendance: 12,621

19 February 1955 29	Blackburn Rovers	2–1	Port Vale	Blackburn
		Report	Done	Stadium: Ewood Park; Attendance: 24,965

5 March 1955 30	Port Vale	3–0	Hull City	Burslem
15:15 GMT	Done; Griffiths	Report		Stadium: Vale Park; Attendance: 16,658

12 March 1955 31	Ipswich Town	1–0	Port Vale	Ipswich
		Report		Stadium: Portman Road; Attendance: 12,970

19 March 1955 32	Port Vale	1–2	Nottingham Forest	Burslem
	Stephenson	Report	Wilson 57'; McLaren 86'	Stadium: Vale Park; Attendance: 17,586; Referee: F Cowen

26 March 1955 33	Leeds United	3–0	Port Vale	Beeston, Leeds
	Ripley; Henderson; Charles	Report		Stadium: Elland Road; Attendance: 8,831

2 April 1955 34	Port Vale	1–0	Bury	Burslem
	Griffiths	Report		Stadium: Vale Park; Attendance: 14,228; Referee: J Mitchell

8 April 1955 35	Port Vale	4–3	Liverpool	Burslem
	Done (pen.)	Report	Anderson 32'; Evans 40'; Liddell 46'	Stadium: Vale Park; Attendance: 24,029

9 April 1955 36	Middlesbrough	2–0	Port Vale	Middlesbrough
	Delapenha; Wayman	Report		Stadium: Ayresome Park; Attendance: 17,795

11 April 1955 37	Liverpool	1–1	Port Vale	Liverpool
	Jackson 67'	Report	Done (pen.)	Stadium: Anfield; Attendance: 36,285

16 April 1955 38	Port Vale	2–0	Birmingham City	Burslem
	Askey; Done	Report		Stadium: Vale Park; Attendance: 24,036

23 April 1955 39	Luton Town	4–2	Port Vale	Luton
		Report	Done; Griffiths	Stadium: Kenilworth Road; Attendance: 16,704

25 April 1955 40	Port Vale	0–1	Stoke City	Burslem
		Report	Bowyer	Stadium: Vale Park; Attendance: 40,066

30 April 1955 41	Port Vale	1–0	Rotherham United	Burslem
	Smith	Report		Stadium: Vale Park; Attendance: 25,271

4 May 1955 42	Lincoln City	0–1	Port Vale	Lincoln
		Report	Smith	Stadium: Sincil Bank; Attendance: 7,044

=== FA Cup ===
8 January 1955 R3	West Ham United	2–2	Port Vale	Upton Park, London
	Bennett; Hooper	Report	Smith; Cunliffe	Stadium: Boleyn Ground; Attendance: 20,364

10 January 1955 Replay	Port Vale	3–1	West Ham United	Burslem
	Leake; Cunliffe; Smith	Report	Hooper	Stadium: Vale Park; Attendance: 11,963

29 January 1955 R4	Tottenham Hotspur	4–2	Port Vale	Tottenham, North London
	Brooks; Duquemin; Gavin	Report	Griffiths	Stadium: White Hart Lane; Attendance: 50,684

== Squad statistics ==
=== Appearances and goals ===
Key to positions: GK – Goalkeeper; FB – Full back; HB – Half back; FW – Forward

No.	Pos	Nat	Player	Total		Second Division		FA Cup	
No.	Pos	Nat	Player	Apps	Goals	Apps	Goals	Apps	Goals
	GK	(England) ENG	Ray Hancock	1	0	1	0	0	0
	GK	(England) ENG	Ray King	44	0	41	0	3	0
	FB	(England) ENG	Fred Donaldson	1	0	1	0	0	0
	FB	(England) ENG	Reg Potts	45	0	42	0	3	0
	FB	(England) ENG	Stan Turner	45	0	42	0	3	0
	HB	(England) ENG	Tommy Cheadle	26	0	26	0	0	0
	HB	(England) ENG	Albert Leake	30	6	27	5	3	1
	HB	(England) ENG	Derek Mountford	2	0	2	0	0	0
	HB	(England) ENG	Roy Sproson	45	1	42	1	3	0
	FW	(England) ENG	Colin Askey	42	4	39	4	3	0
	FW	(England) ENG	Len Barber	2	0	2	0	0	0
	FW	(England) ENG	Alan Bennett	4	0	4	0	0	0
	FW	(England) ENG	John Cunliffe	43	7	40	5	3	2
	FW	(England) ENG	Cyril Done	18	13	18	13	0	0
	FW	(England) ENG	Basil Hayward	33	6	30	6	3	0
	FW	(England) ENG	Mick Hulligan	1	0	1	0	0	0
	FW	(England) ENG	Ken Griffiths	33	7	30	5	3	2
	FW	(England) ENG	Mike Moran	0	0	0	0	0	0
	FW	(England) ENG	Albert Mullard	40	1	37	1	3	0
	FW	(England) ENG	Stan Smith	26	8	23	6	3	2
	FW	(England) ENG	Len Stephenson	10	1	10	1	0	0
	FW	(England) ENG	Derek Tomkinson	4	0	4	0	0	0

=== Top scorers ===
Place	Position	Nation	Name	Second Division	FA Cup	Total
1	FW	England	Cyril Done	13	0	13
2	FW	England	Stan Smith	6	2	8
3	FW	England	Ken Griffiths	5	2	7
–	FW	England	John Cunliffe	5	2	7
5	FW	England	Basil Hayward	6	0	6
–	HB	England	Albert Leake	5	1	6
7	FW	England	Colin Askey	4	0	4
8	HB	England	Roy Sproson	1	0	1
–	FW	England	Albert Mullard	1	0	1
–	FW	England	Len Stephenson	1	0	1
–	–	–	Own goals	1	0	1
			TOTALS	48	7	55

== Transfers ==
=== Transfers in ===
Date from	Position	Nationality	Name	From	Fee	Ref.
December 1954	FW	ENG	Cyril Done	Tranmere Rovers	'four figure fee'	
10 March 1955	FW	ENG	Len Stephenson	Blackpool	£5,000	

=== Transfers out ===
Date from	Position	Nationality	Name	To	Fee	Ref.
July 1955	FW	ENG	Len Barber	Northwich Victoria	Free transfer	
July 1955	FW	ENG	Mick Hulligan	Northwich Victoria	Free transfer	
Summer 1955	HB	ENG	Roy Brien		Released	
Summer 1955	FB	ENG	Jim Elsby	Wereton Queen's Park	Free transfer	
Summer 1955	FW	ENG	Derek Tomkinson	Crewe Alexandra	Free transfer	
