= Maurice Lindley =

English footballer, coach, and manager

William Maurice Lindley (5 December 1915 – 31 July 1994) was an English football player, coach and manager.

== Playing career ==
Lindley began his career with his hometown club Keighley Town before joining Merseyside outfit Everton before going into coaching and management with Swindon Town and Crewe Alexandra.

Though he didn't make a League breakthrough until 1947/48, Lindley had joined Everton from his home-town club Keighley in February 1936. He did make wartime appearances at Goodison, however, as well as guest outings for Bradford City, Leeds, Walsall, Bournemouth and Leicester City (at left-half in January 1945).

Lindley played for Everton as a wing half, making 51 Football League appearances between 1947 and 1951.

== Coaching career ==
He joined Swindon Town as a coach in 1951, stepping up to the manager's seat two years later, when Louis Page was sacked. His time in charge was not a happy one - with the club in financial difficulty, houses were sold to raise cash for players, but Lindley was given just £3,000 to spend. He spent most of this on one player - Matt Gemmell, costing £2,250 from Portsmouth, and he made just eight league appearances for the club.

Swindon finished in their lowest league position in Lindley's first season - 20th - and when the 1954–55 season looked to be going the same way, he was given three months' notice in January 1955. By the time Lindley left the club in April, the Town were well on the way to beating the record set the previous year - with a terrible away record which saw just one win and fifteen defeats, they finished in a lowly 21st position.

A month later, Lindley was appointed as the manager of Crewe Alexandra. His spell at the Railwaymen proved to be even less successful than his time at Swindon, as they finished bottom of the Third Division North three times in three successively worse seasons. Lindley was sacked after the third bottom-place finish, which meant that the club would be competing in the new Fourth Division the following year.

Later Lindley teamed up with Don Revie at Leeds United and became his valued assistant manager and chief scout. Lindley stayed at the club for over twenty years and became caretaker manager on four separate occasions (1974, twice in 1978 and 1980). He retired in May 1981.
