= 1949–50 Port Vale F.C. season =

Port Vale F.C.
1949–50 season
- Chairman: William Holdcroft
- Manager: Gordon Hodgson
- Stadium: Old Recreation Ground
- Football League Third Division South: 13th (41 points)
- FA Cup: Fourth Round (eliminated by Burnley)
- Top goalscorer: League: Cliff Pinchbeck (14); All: Cliff Pinchbeck (16)
- Highest home attendance: 18,218 vs. Nottingham Forest, 11 February 1950
- Lowest home attendance: 8,496 vs. Torquay United, 27 March 1950
- Average home league attendance: 12,983
- Biggest win: 4–0 vs. Millwall, 12 November 1949
- Biggest defeat: 0–3 vs. Millwall, 1 April 1950
Home colours

The 1949–50 season was Port Vale's 38th season of football in the English Football League, and their fifth full season in the Third Division South. It was also the final season at the Old Recreation Ground, amid ongoing disputes over the proposed move to Vale Park. Vale finished in 13th place, accumulating 41 points over 42 league fixtures — including the season's largest win, 4–0 versus Millwall on 12 November 1949, and their heaviest defeat, 3–0 away to Millwall on 1 April 1950.

In the FA Cup, Vale enjoyed a deeper run, reaching the Fourth Round before bowing out to Burnley. Cliff Pinchbeck was both the league and season top scorer, netting 14 goals in the league and 16 overall across all competitions. Home attendance figures remained robust: an average crowd of 12,983, peaking at just under this in several fixtures, with the lowest turnout of 8,496 recorded against Torquay United on 27 March 1950. Financially, the club secured a significant boost with the sale of Ronnie Allen to West Bromwich Albion for £20,000, a major transaction on and off the pitch.

Overall, the season served as a transitional campaign: solid mid‑table performance on the field, farewell to the Old Recreation Ground off it, and a key departure in Allen, marking the approach of a new era at Port Vale.

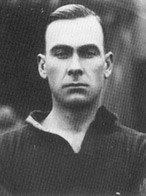
Manager Gordon Hodgson during his playing days.

== Overview ==
=== Third Division South ===
The pre-season saw the arrival of experienced full-back Lol Hamlett from Bolton Wanderers, young keeper Ray King from Leyton Orient (brother of George). On his arrival King stated that Old Recreation Ground was like 'some shanty town out west' and compared the dressing room to 'a dungeon', despite which somehow he 'felt completely at home'. The playing staff now stood at 59 amateurs and 27 full-time professionals.

The season opened with a 1–0 win over Bristol Rovers, which was followed by a 1–0 reverse to Southend United at Roots Hall three days later. This loss was thanks to an own goal from Garth Butler, who put the ball into his own net despite being some distance from any Southend players. A seven-match unbeaten run followed, built upon a defence that leaked just five goals, King and Hamlett settling in well. A 2–0 victory at Watford on 10 September took the club to within a point of second-place, though George King was concussed in a collision and spent five days recovering in hospital. Three straight wins at the start of October, including at third-placed Norwich City, where Alan Martin fractured his collarbone, put the club in a strong position. Bad news off the field returned, however, when Stoke-on-Trent City Council rejected the club's application to move two stands from the Old Recreation Ground to the new stadium. As a result, the club set up a 100,000 Shilling Fund to build the two stands from scratch.

On the pitch results began to turn against the "Valiants", and so striker Cliff Pinchbeck was signed from Brighton & Hove Albion for a £3,500 fee. Pinchbeck marked his debut with a hat-trick over Millwall, receiving a standing ovation from his new fans. More off-field stadium troubles came when the Regional Officer of the Minister of Works refused a licence for the stadium on unspecified grounds. Club officials were forced to travel to London to discuss the matter with the minister, eventually convincing him to change his mind. The home match with Newport County on 15 October was notable as the first Vale match to offer a matchday programme. On 17 December, Vale lost 2–1 at Bristol Rovers, though went the next five games unbeaten. This included a 3–1 Boxing Day win over Northampton Town in which the team displayed "pace, method, excitement, tension and well-taken goals".

A successful Christmas period took Vale into sixth place by mid-February. George King was then sold to Barrow for a four-figure fee, after which Pinchbeck was the only regular scorer. Six games without a win followed, ending the club's hopes of opening the new stadium in the Second Division. The Shilling Fund had only raised 17,738 shillings. So Ronnie Allen was sold to top-flight West Bromwich Albion for a massive £20,000, smashing the club's transfer record. Allen went on to play for England, whilst the fee went towards the new ground. Back to the league, the Vale were seventh at the start of April, but six defeats in their final eight games saw them tumble down the table. On 7 April, they slipped to a 3–1 defeat at promotion-chasing Notts County. They won by the same scoreline in the return fixture three days later, disappointing the 42 buses and two football specials that transported Notts supporters to the match. The final match at the Old Recreation Ground was a disappointing 1–0 defeat to Aldershot on 22 April.

They finished in 13th place with 41 points. The defence was the third strongest in the division. However, only Watford scored fewer goals. Pinchbeck was the only goalscorer of any consistency.

=== Finances ===
On the financial side, a profit of £10,671 was made, another record: this was due to the sale of Allen, which gave them a transfer credit of £15,000. The wage bill had risen by £6,000 to £22,333, whereas gate receipts had risen by around £3,000 to £29,050. Eric Eastwood was the only major departure of the summer. Trouble with the new ground continued, as the Regional Officer of the Ministry of Works refused to permit the transfer of the stand from the old to the new stadium, despite having approved similar procedures at Liverpool and Millwall. Chairman William Holdcroft felt this was unfair and was supported by Stoke-on-Trent North MP Albert Davies. Despite this set-back the stadium was opened on 2 August in a ceremony attended by 12,000 rain-soaked people.

=== FA Cup ===
In the FA Cup, Vale progressed past Athenian League amateurs Wealdstone and Tranmere Rovers of the Third Division North with 1–0 home wins. Beating Newport County at Somerton Park with a Ronnie Allen brace, they came up against First Division Burnley in the fourth round at Turf Moor. There, they lost 2–1 in front of 49,692 spectators – including 12,000 Vale fans.

== Results ==
=== Football League Third Division South ===
==== League table ====
Pos	Team	Pld	W	D	L	GF	GA	GAv	Pts
11	Norwich City	42	16	10	16	65	63	1.032	42
12	Bournemouth & Boscombe Athletic	42	16	10	16	57	56	1.018	42
13	Port Vale	42	15	11	16	47	42	1.119	41
14	Swindon Town	42	15	11	16	59	62	0.952	41
15	Bristol City	42	15	10	17	60	61	0.984	40

==== Results by matchday ====
Round	1	2	3	4	5	6	7	8	9	10	11	12	13	14	15	16	17	18	19	20	21	22	23	24	25	26	27	28	29	30	31	32	33	34	35	36	37	38	39	40	41	42
Ground	H	A	A	H	H	H	A	H	A	H	A	H	A	H	A	H	A	A	A	H	H	A	A	H	A	H	H	A	H	A	H	A	H	H	A	A	H	H	A	H	A	A
Result	W	L	D	D	W	D	W	D	L	W	W	W	L	W	L	W	D	L	L	D	W	D	W	W	L	W	D	L	D	D	L	L	W	W	L	L	L	W	D	L	L	L
Position	1	9	12	8	7	5	8	8	9	9	7	5	7	5	9	8	7	8	10	10	7	9	8	7	8	6	5	6	9	6	8	10	8	6	7	9	10	9	7	10	11	13
Points	2	2	3	4	6	7	9	10	10	12	14	16	16	18	18	20	21	21	21	22	24	25	27	29	29	31	32	32	33	34	34	34	36	38	38	38	38	40	41	41	41	41

Source: Statto
A = Away; H = Home; W = Win; D = Draw; L = Loss

==== Matches ====
20 August 1949 1	Port Vale	1–0	Bristol Rovers	Hanley
	Allen	Report		Stadium: Old Recreation Ground; Attendance: 15,097

23 August 1949 2	Southend United	1–0	Port Vale	Southend-on-Sea
		Report		Stadium: Southend Stadium; Attendance: 9,434

27 August 1949 3	Bournemouth & Boscombe Athletic	2–2	Port Vale	Bournemouth
		Report	King	Stadium: Dean Court; Attendance: 19,101

29 August 1949 4	Port Vale	0–0	Southend United	Hanley
		Report		Stadium: Old Recreation Ground; Attendance: 14,686

3 September 1949 5	Port Vale	2–0	Crystal Palace	Hanley
	Martin	Report		Stadium: Old Recreation Ground; Attendance: 13,788

5 September 1949 6	Port Vale	2–2	Ipswich Town	Hanley
	Martin; Cheadle	Report		Stadium: Old Recreation Ground; Attendance: 12,297

10 September 1949 7	Watford	0–2	Port Vale	Watford
		Report	King; Aveyard	Stadium: Vicarage Road; Attendance: 10,583

17 September 1949 8	Port Vale	1–1	Reading	Hanley
	(og.)	Report		Stadium: Old Recreation Ground; Attendance: 12,948

24 September 1949 9	Leyton Orient	1–0	Port Vale	Leyton, East London
		Report		Stadium: Brisbane Road; Attendance: 15,698

1 October 1949 10	Port Vale	1–0	Exeter City	Hanley
	Martin 57'	Report		Stadium: Old Recreation Ground; Attendance: 11,499

8 October 1949 11	Norwich City	0–1	Port Vale	Norwich
		Report	Allen	Stadium: Carrow Road; Attendance: 26,831

15 October 1949 12	Port Vale	1–0	Newport County	Hanley
	Allen	Report		Stadium: Old Recreation Ground; Attendance: 12,599

22 October 1949 13	Bristol City	2–0	Port Vale	Ashton Gate, Bristol
		Report		Stadium: Ashton Gate; Attendance: 19,855

29 October 1949 14	Port Vale	3–0	Brighton & Hove Albion	Hanley
	Aveyard; Allen; Barber	Report		Stadium: Old Recreation Ground; Attendance: 11,189

5 November 1949 15	Walsall	1–0	Port Vale	Walsall
		Report		Stadium: Fellows Park; Attendance: 9,605

12 November 1949 16	Port Vale	4–0	Millwall	Hanley
	Pinchbeck; Aveyard	Report		Stadium: Old Recreation Ground; Attendance: 12,918

19 November 1949 17	Swindon Town	0–0	Port Vale	Swindon
		Report		Stadium: County Ground; Attendance: 9,039; Referee: W.R. Rogers

3 December 1949 18	Aldershot	1–0	Port Vale	Aldershot
		Report		Stadium: Recreation Ground; Attendance: 4,043

17 December 1949 19	Bristol Rovers	2–1	Port Vale	Bristol
		Report	Palk	Stadium: Eastville Stadium; Attendance: 10,105

24 December 1949 20	Port Vale	1–1	Bournemouth & Boscombe Athletic	Hanley
	Pinchbeck	Report		Stadium: Old Recreation Ground; Attendance: 13,092

26 December 1949 21	Port Vale	3–1	Northampton Town	Hanley
	Pinchbeck; Martin	Report		Stadium: Old Recreation Ground; Attendance: 17,212

27 December 1949 22	Northampton Town	1–1	Port Vale	Northampton
		Report	Martin	Stadium: County Cricket Ground; Attendance: 19,263

31 December 1949 23	Crystal Palace	0–1	Port Vale	Selhurst, Croydon
		Report	Pinchbeck	Stadium: Selhurst Park; Attendance: 12,609

14 January 1950 24	Port Vale	2–0	Watford	Hanley
	Allen; Pinchbeck	Report		Stadium: Old Recreation Ground; Attendance: 17,387

21 January 1950 25	Reading	2–1	Port Vale	Reading, Berkshire
		Report	Pinchbeck	Stadium: Elm Park; Attendance: 11,284

4 February 1950 26	Port Vale	2–0	Leyton Orient	Hanley
	Allen; Martin	Report		Stadium: Old Recreation Ground; Attendance: 14,176

11 February 1950 27	Port Vale	1–1	Nottingham Forest	Hanley
15:00 GMT	Pinchbeck	Report	Ardron 75'	Stadium: Old Recreation Ground; Attendance: 18,218; Referee: L Richardson

18 February 1950 28	Exeter City	3–1	Port Vale	Exeter
		Report	Pinchbeck	Stadium: St James Park; Attendance: 9,632; Referee: W.E.Dellow

25 February 1950 29	Port Vale	2–2	Norwich City	Hanley
	Hayward; Palk	Report		Stadium: Old Recreation Ground; Attendance: 11,204

4 March 1950 30	Newport County	1–1	Port Vale	Newport, Wales
	Griffiths	Report	Aveyard	Stadium: Somerton Park; Attendance: 8,762

11 March 1950 31	Port Vale	0–2	Bristol City	Hanley
		Report		Stadium: Old Recreation Ground; Attendance: 11,444

18 March 1950 32	Brighton & Hove Albion	2–1	Port Vale	Hove
		Report	Aveyard	Stadium: Goldstone Ground; Attendance: 11,852

25 March 1950 33	Port Vale	2–0	Walsall	Hanley
	Aveyard; Pinchbeck	Report		Stadium: Old Recreation Ground; Attendance: 9,763

27 March 1950 34	Port Vale	2–0	Torquay United	Hanley
	Hulligan; Potts	Report		Stadium: Old Recreation Ground; Attendance: 8,496

1 April 1950 35	Millwall	3–0	Port Vale	New Cross, Lewisham
		Report		Stadium: The Den; Attendance: 18,088

7 April 1950 36	Notts County	3–1	Port Vale	Nottingham
	Boyes; Lawton; Simpson	Report	Palk	Stadium: Meadow Lane; Attendance: 32,097

8 April 1950 37	Port Vale	0–1	Swindon Town	Hanley
		Report	Peart 78'	Stadium: Old Recreation Ground; Attendance: 9,607; Referee: W.R. Rogers

10 April 1950 38	Port Vale	3–1	Notts County	Hanley
	Pinchbeck; Hulligan	Report	Lawton	Stadium: Old Recreation Ground; Attendance: 15,380

15 April 1950 39	Torquay United	0–0	Port Vale	Torquay
		Report		Stadium: Plainmoor; Attendance: 8,037

22 April 1950 40	Port Vale	0–1	Aldershot	Hanley
		Report		Stadium: Old Recreation Ground; Attendance: 9,645

29 April 1950 41	Nottingham Forest	2–0	Port Vale	West Bridgford
15:00 BST	Kaile 55'; Ardron 77'	Report		Stadium: City Ground; Attendance: 5,906; Referee: L Richardson

6 May 1950 42	Ipswich Town	2–1	Port Vale	Ipswich
		Report	McGarry	Stadium: Portman Road; Attendance: 12,451

=== FA Cup ===
26 November 1949 R1	Port Vale	1–0	Wealdstone	Hanley
	Pinchbeck	Report		Stadium: Old Recreation Ground; Attendance: 14,935

10 December 1949 R2	Port Vale	1–0	Tranmere Rovers	Hanley
	Pinchbeck	Report		Stadium: Old Recreation Ground; Attendance: 14,716

7 January 1950 R3	Newport County	1–2	Port Vale	Newport, Wales
		Report	Allen	Stadium: Somerton Park; Attendance: 17,781

28 January 1950 R4	Burnley	2–1	Port Vale	Burnley
		Report	Martin	Stadium: Turf Moor; Attendance: 49,692

== Squad statistics ==
=== Appearances and goals ===
Key to positions: GK – Goalkeeper; FB – Full back; HB – Half back; FW – Forward

No.	Pos	Nat	Player	Total		Third Division South		FA Cup	
No.	Pos	Nat	Player	Apps	Goals	Apps	Goals	Apps	Goals
	GK	(England) ENG	George Heppell	3	0	3	0	0	0
	GK	(England) ENG	Ray King	43	0	39	0	4	0
	FB	(England) ENG	Garth Butler	43	0	39	0	4	0
	FB	(England) ENG	Jim Elsby	2	0	2	0	0	0
	FB	(England) ENG	Lol Hamlett	44	0	40	0	4	0
	FB	(England) ENG	Reg Potts	3	1	3	1	0	0
	HB	(England) ENG	Tommy Cheadle	46	1	42	1	4	0
	HB	(England) ENG	Norman Hallam	1	0	1	0	0	0
	HB	(England) ENG	Basil Hayward	1	1	1	1	0	0
	HB	(England) ENG	Alan Martin	28	8	24	7	4	1
	HB	(England) ENG	Bill McGarry	46	1	42	1	4	0
	HB	(Ireland) EIR	Jimmy Todd	41	0	37	0	4	0
	FW	(England) ENG	Colin Askey	4	0	4	0	0	0
	FW	(England) ENG	Walter Aveyard	23	6	23	6	0	0
	FW	(England) ENG	Alan Bennett	10	0	10	0	0	0
	FW	(England) ENG	Ken Griffiths	2	0	2	0	0	0
	FW	(England) ENG	Mick Hulligan	42	2	38	2	4	0
	FW	(England) ENG	Stan Palk	46	3	42	3	4	0
	FW	(England) ENG	Cliff Pinchbeck	31	16	27	14	4	2
Players who featured but departed the club during the season:
	HB	(England) ENG	Eric Eastwood	0	0	0	0	0	0
	HB	(England) ENG	Wilf Smith	0	0	0	0	0	0
	FW	(England) ENG	Ronnie Allen	31	8	27	6	4	2
	FW	(England) ENG	Bernard Jones	0	0	0	0	0	0
	FW	(England) ENG	George King	8	3	8	3	0	0
	FW	(England) ENG	Pat Raftery	3	0	3	0	0	0

=== Top scorers ===
Place	Position	Nation	Name	Third Division South	FA Cup	Total
1	FW	England	Cliff Pinchbeck	14	2	16
2	HB	England	Alan Martin	7	1	8
–	FW	England	Ronnie Allen	6	2	8
4	FW	England	Walter Aveyard	6	0	6
5	FW	England	Stan Palk	3	0	3
–	FW	England	George King	3	0	3
7	FW	England	Mick Hulligan	2	0	2
8	FW	England	Len Barber	1	0	1
–	HB	England	Basil Hayward	1	0	1
–	FB	England	Reg Potts	1	0	1
–	HB	England	Tommy Cheadle	1	0	1
–	HB	England	Bill McGarry	1	0	1
–	–	–	Own goals	1	0	1
			TOTALS	47	5	52

== Transfers ==
=== Transfers in ===
Date from	Position	Nationality	Name	From	Fee	Ref.
May 1949	FB	ENG	John Abbotts	Ravenscliffe	Free transfer	
May 1949	GK	ENG	Ray King	Ashington	Free transfer	
May 1949	FB	ENG	Lol Hamlett	Bolton Wanderers	Free transfer	
July 1949	HB	ENG	Roy Sproson	Stoke City	Free transfer	
November 1949	FW	ENG	Cliff Pinchbeck	Brighton & Hove Albion	£3,500	
February 1950	FW	ENG	Ken Griffiths	Northwood Mission	Free transfer	
February 1950	HB	ENG	Albert Leake	Stoke City	Free transfer	
March 1950	FW	ENG	Roland Lewis	Congleton Town	Free transfer	

=== Transfers out ===
Date from	Position	Nationality	Name	To	Fee	Ref.
November 1949	FW	ENG	Bernard Jones	Winsford United	Free transfer	
February 1950	FW	ENG	George King	Barrow	'four-figure fee'	
February 1950	FW	ENG	Pat Raftery	Wellington Town	Free transfer	
March 1950	FW	ENG	Ronnie Allen	West Bromwich Albion	£20,000	
April 1950	HB	ENG	Eric Eastwood		Released	
April 1950	HB	ENG	Wilf Smith	Buxton	Free transfer	
