= Mick Hulligan =

English footballer

Personal information
- Full name: Michael John Hulligan
- Date of birth: 28 February 1923
- Place of birth: Liverpool, England
- Date of death: 12 September 1978 (aged 55)
- Place of death: Hartshill, Stoke-on-Trent, England
- Position: Winger

Youth career
- Liverpool

Senior career*
Years	Team	Apps	(Gls)
1948–1955	Port Vale	197	(22)
- Northwich Victoria
- * Club domestic league appearances and goals

Michael John Hulligan (28 February 1923 – 12 September 1978) was an English footballer. In a seven-year career in the Football League with Port Vale, he made 208 league and cup appearances and scored 23 goals. He helped the club to win the Third Division North title in 1953–54.

== Career ==
Hulligan played for Liverpool before he and Stan Palk joined Port Vale in July 1948 for what was, at the time, a club record combined transfer fee of £10,000. He impressed manager Gordon Hodgson, who subsequently sold wing rival Walter Keeley. He scored his first senior goal on 23 August 1948, in a 3–0 win over Reading at the Old Recreation Ground. However, he broke his ankle the following month, causing him to miss much of the season. He nevertheless hit five goals in 28 Third Division South games in 1948–49. He scored twice in 42 appearances in 1949–50, and was an ever-present for the 50 game 1950–51 season – the first to be played at the newly built Vale Park.

Hulligan scored four goals in 38 games in 1951–52 and four goals in 45 games in 1952–53, as he was a key part of Freddie Steele's squad that finished second in the Third Division North. However, he lost his first-team place however, in August 1953, and played just five league games of the club's highly successful 1953–54 campaign, missing out on the "Valiants" run to the FA Cup semi-finals. He featured just once in the Second Division in 1954–55. He was transferred to non-League side Northwich Victoria in July 1955.

== Career statistics ==
Appearances and goals by club, season and competition
Club	Season	League			FA Cup		Total	
Club	Season	Division	Apps	Goals	Apps	Goals	Apps	Goals
Port Vale	1948–49	Third Division South	28	5	0	0	28	5
Port Vale	1949–50	Third Division South	38	2	4	0	42	2
Port Vale	1950–51	Third Division South	46	7	4	1	50	8
Port Vale	1951–52	Third Division South	37	4	1	0	38	4
Port Vale	1952–53	Third Division North	42	4	2	0	44	4
Port Vale	1953–54	Third Division North	5	0	0	0	5	0
Port Vale	1954–55	Second Division	1	0	0	0	1	0
Port Vale	Total		197	22	11	1	208	23

== Honours ==
Port Vale

- Football League Third Division North: 1953–54
