= Bernard Jones =

Bernard Jones may refer to:

- Bernard Jones (footballer, born 1924) (1924–2000), English footballer who played for Port Vale
- Bernard Jones (footballer, born 1934), English footballer who played for Northampton Town, Cardiff City and Shrewsbury Town
- Bernard Mouat Jones (1882–1953), chemist
- Bernard M. Jones (born 1979), United States magistrate judge
