= 1950–51 Port Vale F.C. season =

Port Vale F.C.
1950–51 season
- Chairman: William Holdcroft
- Manager: Gordon Hodgson
- Stadium: Vale Park
- Football League Third Division South: 12th (45 points)
- FA Cup: Third Round (eliminated by Stoke City)
- Top goalscorer: League: Cliff Pinchbeck (16); All: Cliff Pinchbeck (19)
- Highest home attendance: 30,196 vs. Newport County, 24 August 1950
- Lowest home attendance: 2,630 vs. Exeter City, 30 April 1951
- Average home league attendance: 10,832
- Biggest win: 3–0 vs. Exeter City, 10 February 1951
- Biggest defeat: 0–3 (twice)
Home colours

The 1950–51 season was Port Vale's 39th season of football in the English Football League, and their sixth full season in the Third Division South. It was the first at the newly-built Vale Park, which replaced the Old Recreation Ground in the summer of 1950. Under manager Gordon Hodgson and chairman William Holdcroft, Vale achieved a 12th‑place finish with 45 points, concluding their league campaign with a record of 16 wins, 13 draws and 17 defeats from 46 matches (scoring 60 goals, conceding 65).

In the FA Cup, Potteries derby rivals Stoke City visited Vale Park in the Third Round, drawing 2–2 away before Vale fell 1–0 in a replay in front of a packed 49,500 crowd. Cliff Pinchbeck led the scoring, finishing as both league top scorer (16 goals) and overall top scorer (19). Attendances held up well at the new stadium, with an average crowd of 10,832, although the lowest turnout was just 2,630 for the fixture against Exeter City on 30 April 1951. The season also saw the debut of club legend Roy Sproson, and was tinged with tragedy: manager Hodgson died the following summer after cancer, making it his final term in charge.

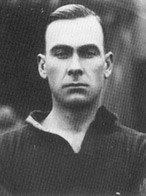
Manager Gordon Hodgson during his playing days.

== Overview ==
=== Third Division South ===
The pre-season saw expansion for the league, and so the addition of two new teams to the division; nevertheless, only one promotion place was available for the 24 teams. For Vale, two attacking players were added to the squad; Syd Peppitt arrived from Stoke City for £4,000, and Roland Lewis was signed from Congleton Town.

The season opened with a 2–0 defeat to Norwich City at Carrow Road, though the real excitement came five days later on 24 August, when Vale Park hosted its first league game; 30,196 turned up to see Newport County beaten 1–0 with a Walter Aveyard goal. The stadium had cost £50,000 and held 40,000 spectators, though work was still needed to complete the covers. Three straight losses followed, and as a result, four players were transfer listed. As the weather turned bleak, the attendance suffered, as less than a fortnight after its opening, the stadium hosted 15,884 fans for the win over Ipswich Town (a reduction of almost 50%). The lack of cover did nothing to encourage fans to show up. Nevertheless, the team won six of their opening seven home games, losing six of their first seven away games. On 14 October, Vale were beaten 2–0 at bottom club Walsall. On 28 October, they travelled to The Den, where they fought to earn a 2–2 draw with high-flying Millwall, Tommy Cheadle playing on despite breaking three teeth in a hefty collision. On 11 November they drew 1–1 with Gillingham at the Priestfield Stadium. This game saw the first of Roy Sproson's 842 club appearances. The Christmas Day stalemate with Bristol Rovers had to be played at the Victoria Ground as the Vale Park pitch suffered from inadequate drainage that made it vulnerable to postponements.

Results tailed off after Christmas, leaving Vale in a re-election fight by the start of February. This was partly due to an outbreak of flu, which affected eleven of the players. A run of eight wins in eleven games soon allayed any fears of Vale losing their league status. A 3–0 win at Exeter City was the club's first away win in 25 attempts, and was duly followed by a 3–2 victory at Leyton Orient two weeks later. The club were so confident as to sell right-half Bill McGarry to Huddersfield Town for £12,000 – he would later be selected in the England squad for the 1954 FIFA World Cup. On 31 March, Vale won 4–3 at home to Gillingham, despite Billy Hales scoring a hat-trick on his debut for the visitors. Waterlogging of the Vale Park pitch caused numerous games to be postponed, as well as abandonment when the team were 5–1 ahead against Crystal Palace. This meant six home games would be played between 23 April and 3 May. This gave young reserves a chance to impress. The one victory, 2–0 at home to Exeter City, came on a total quagmire.

They finished 12th with 45 points, 25 points short of promotion. Cliff Pinchbeck proved to be the only regular scorer, with 19 goals, though he was on the transfer list at his own request.

=== Finances ===
On the financial side, a profit of £5,367 was recorded thanks to a transfer credit of £12,315. Gate receipts had fallen to £27,650, though the wage bill was slashed to £20,063. Leaving the club were new signings Peppitt and Lewis, the former joining Worcester City. On 16 May, the club hosted Progrès Niederkorn of Luxembourg, who were on their British tour, Vale won 4–1. After the game 3,000 tons of soil were removed from the stadium, as a new drainage system was installed. On 14 June, manager Gordon Hodgson died following a lengthy battle against cancer, his funeral at Carmountside was conducted by Reverend Norman Hallam. His replacement was Ivor Powell, who was signed as player-manager from Aston Villa.

=== FA Cup ===
In the FA Cup, the "Valiants" progressed past Third Division North New Brighton and Lancashire Combination Nelson with two 3–2 home victories. Drawn against First Division Potteries derby rivals Stoke in the third round, it was the first competitive derby game since 1933. Vale showed some 'lively attacking' to achieve a 2–2 draw at the Victoria Ground on 6 January in front of a crowd of 49,500. Vale Park had problems with drainage, and so the replay two days later had to be played at the Victoria Ground as well – this time, 40,977 fans showed up. Stoke won by the odd goal from Frank Bowyer, though Vale were consoled by the £2,800 worth of gate receipts they had earned.

== Results ==
=== Football League Third Division South ===
==== League table ====
Pos	Team	Pld	W	D	L	GF	GA	GAv	Pts
10	Bristol City	46	20	11	15	64	59	1.085	51
11	Newport County	46	19	9	18	77	70	1.100	47
12	Port Vale	46	16	13	17	60	65	0.923	45
13	Brighton & Hove Albion	46	13	17	16	71	79	0.899	43
14	Exeter City	46	18	6	22	62	85	0.729	42

==== Results by matchday ====
Round	1	2	3	4	5	6	7	8	9	10	11	12	13	14	15	16	17	18	19	20	21	22	23	24	25	26	27	28	29	30	31	32	33	34	35	36	37	38	39	40	41	42	43	44	45	46
Ground	A	H	H	A	A	H	A	A	H	A	H	H	A	H	A	H	A	H	H	A	H	A	H	A	A	A	H	A	A	A	H	H	A	A	A	H	H	A	H	A	H	H	H	H	H	A
Result	L	W	L	L	L	W	L	D	W	L	W	W	L	W	D	L	D	W	W	D	D	L	D	D	L	L	W	W	L	W	D	W	L	L	W	W	W	L	D	D	L	D	D	W	L	D
Position	19	16	21	24	24	19	21	21	18	21	20	16	18	15	14	16	16	13	13	13	13	14	15	15	16	17	17	14	17	13	14	12	13	14	13	12	11	12	13	13	14	14	13	12	12	12
Points	0	2	2	2	2	4	4	5	7	7	9	11	11	13	14	14	15	17	19	20	21	21	22	23	23	23	25	27	27	29	30	32	32	32	34	36	38	38	39	40	40	41	42	44	44	45

Source: Statto
A = Away; H = Home; W = Win; D = Draw; L = Loss

==== Matches ====
19 August 1950 1	Norwich City	2–0	Port Vale	Norwich
		Report		Stadium: Carrow Road; Attendance: 27,288

24 August 1950 2	Port Vale	1–0	Newport County	Burslem
	Aveyard	Report		Stadium: Vale Park; Attendance: 30,196

26 August 1950 3	Port Vale	0–3	Northampton Town	Burslem
		Report		Stadium: Vale Park; Attendance: 21,424

31 August 1950 4	Newport County	2–1	Port Vale	Newport, Wales
	Parker; Moore	Report	Palk (pen.)	Stadium: Somerton Park; Attendance: 13,537

2 September 1950 5	Plymouth Argyle	1–0	Port Vale	Plymouth
	Blatchford	Report		Stadium: Home Park; Attendance: 19,288

4 September 1950 6	Port Vale	1–0	Ipswich Town	Burslem
	Pinchbeck	Report		Stadium: Vale Park; Attendance: 15,884

9 September 1950 7	Nottingham Forest	2–1	Port Vale	West Bridgford
15:00 BST	Capel 31'; Ardron 80'	Report	Hulligan	Stadium: City Ground; Attendance: 29,295; Referee: B Flanagan

13 September 1950 8	Ipswich Town	2–2	Port Vale	Ipswich
		Report	Pinchbeck; Hulligan	Stadium: Portman Road; Attendance: 10,724

16 September 1950 9	Port Vale	1–0	Torquay United	Burslem
	Pinchbeck	Report		Stadium: Vale Park; Attendance: 14,424

23 September 1950 10	Aldershot	2–0	Port Vale	Aldershot
		Report		Stadium: Recreation Ground; Attendance: 7,358

30 September 1950 11	Port Vale	2–1	Swindon Town	Burslem
	Peppitt; Bennett	Report	Court 3'	Stadium: Vale Park; Attendance: 9,517; Referee: G.L. Iliffe

7 October 1950 12	Port Vale	3–1	Leyton Orient	Burslem
	Hulligan; Peppitt; Pinchbeck	Report		Stadium: Vale Park; Attendance: 12,899

14 October 1950 13	Walsall	2–0	Port Vale	Walsall
		Report		Stadium: Fellows Park; Attendance: 9,686

21 October 1950 14	Port Vale	2–1	Watford	Burslem
	Pinchbeck	Report	Fisher	Stadium: Vale Park; Attendance: 12,112

28 October 1950 15	Millwall	2–2	Port Vale	New Cross, Lewisham
		Report	Martin; McGarry	Stadium: The Den; Attendance: 25,799

4 November 1950 16	Port Vale	1–3	Bristol City	Burslem
	Hulligan	Report		Stadium: Vale Park; Attendance: 11,603

11 November 1950 17	Gillingham	1–1	Port Vale	Gillingham, Kent
	Thomas	Report	Peppitt	Stadium: Priestfield Stadium; Attendance: 12,103

18 November 1950 18	Port Vale	3–1	Bournemouth & Boscombe Athletic	Burslem
	Pinchbeck; Palk (pen.); Aveyard	Report		Stadium: Vale Park; Attendance: 8,153

2 December 1950 19	Port Vale	3–1	Southend United	Burslem
	Pinchbeck; Palk	Report		Stadium: Vale Park; Attendance: 8,339

23 December 1950 20	Northampton Town	1–1	Port Vale	Northampton
		Report	Martin	Stadium: County Cricket Ground; Attendance: 8,785

25 December 1950 21	Port Vale	0–0	Bristol Rovers	Burslem
		Report		Stadium: Vale Park; Attendance: 13,250

26 December 1950 22	Bristol Rovers	2–0	Port Vale	Bristol
		Report		Stadium: Eastville Stadium; Attendance: 22,279

13 January 1951 23	Port Vale	1–1	Nottingham Forest	Burslem
15:00 GMT	Pinchbeck	Report	Capel 15'	Stadium: Vale Park; Attendance: 13,148; Referee: B Flanagan

17 January 1951 24	Brighton & Hove Albion	2–2	Port Vale	Hove
		Report	Pinchbeck	Stadium: Goldstone Ground; Attendance: 5,754

20 January 1951 25	Torquay United	3–2	Port Vale	Torquay
		Report	Aveyard; McGarry	Stadium: Plainmoor; Attendance: 6,280

27 January 1951 26	Reading	3–0	Port Vale	Reading, Berkshire
		Report		Stadium: Elm Park; Attendance: 15,409

3 February 1951 27	Port Vale	3–1	Aldershot	Burslem
	Aveyard; Pinchbeck; Martin	Report		Stadium: Vale Park; Attendance: 8,606

10 February 1951 28	Exeter City	0–3	Port Vale	Exeter
		Report	Palk; Hulligan; Martin	Stadium: St James Park; Attendance: 7,893; Referee: W.E.Dellow; Assistant referees: G.W.Stevenson, H.C.Dowell

17 February 1951 29	Swindon Town	2–1	Port Vale	Swindon
	Peart 17'; Millar 84'	Report	Pinchbeck 33'	Stadium: County Ground; Attendance: 7,889; Referee: G.L. Iliffe

24 February 1951 30	Leyton Orient	2–3	Port Vale	Leyton
		Report	Hulligan; Pinchbeck (og.)	Stadium: Brisbane Road; Attendance: 6,861

3 March 1951 31	Port Vale	1–1	Walsall	Burslem
	Pinchbeck	Report		Stadium: Vale Park; Attendance: 13,071

5 March 1951 32	Port Vale	2–1	Plymouth Argyle	Burslem
	Aveyard; Martin	Report	Willis	Stadium: Vale Park; Attendance: 4,894

10 March 1951 33	Watford	2–0	Port Vale	Watford
	Garbutt; Oliver	Report		Stadium: Vicarage Road; Attendance: 6,610

24 March 1951 34	Bristol City	3–1	Port Vale	Ashton Gate, Bristol
		Report	Hulligan	Stadium: Ashton Gate; Attendance: 17,301

26 March 1951 35	Crystal Palace	0–2	Port Vale	Selhurst, Croydon
		Report	Barber (og.)	Stadium: Selhurst Park; Attendance: 11,320

31 March 1951 36	Port Vale	4–3	Gillingham	Burslem
	Aveyard; Griffiths; Barber	Report	Hales	Stadium: Vale Park; Attendance: 5,947

2 April 1951 37	Port Vale	2–1	Norwich City	Burslem
	Barber	Report		Stadium: Vale Park; Attendance: 10,247

7 April 1951 38	Bournemouth & Boscombe Athletic	3–1	Port Vale	Bournemouth
		Report	Barber	Stadium: Dean Court; Attendance: 8,742

16 April 1951 39	Port Vale	1–1	Colchester United	Burslem
	Palk	Report	Elder	Stadium: Vale Park; Attendance: 8,520

21 April 1951 40	Southend United	1–1	Port Vale	Southend-on-Sea
		Report	Griffiths	Stadium: Southend Stadium; Attendance: 8,554

23 April 1951 41	Port Vale	0–1	Brighton & Hove Albion	Burslem
		Report		Stadium: Vale Park; Attendance: 10,340

26 April 1951 42	Port Vale	2–2	Crystal Palace	Burslem
	Palk; Bennett	Report		Stadium: Vale Park; Attendance: 7,069

28 April 1951 43	Port Vale	0–0	Reading	Burslem
		Report		Stadium: Vale Park; Attendance: 3,402

30 April 1951 44	Port Vale	2–0	Exeter City	Burslem
	Cunliffe; Barber	Report		Stadium: Vale Park; Attendance: 2,630

3 May 1951 45	Port Vale	0–1	Millwall	Burslem
		Report		Stadium: Vale Park; Attendance: 5,459

5 May 1951 46	Colchester United	1–1	Port Vale	Colchester
	McKim	Report	Barber	Stadium: Layer Road; Attendance: 8,414

=== FA Cup ===
25 November 1950 R1	Port Vale	3–2	New Brighton	Burslem
	Aveyard; Pinchbeck	Report		Stadium: Vale Park; Attendance: 8,997

9 December 1950 R2	Port Vale	3–2	Nelson	Burslem
	Pinchbeck; Hulligan; Aveyard	Report		Stadium: Vale Park; Attendance: 11,088

6 January 1951 R3	Stoke City	2–2	Port Vale	Stoke-upon-Trent
	Mullard	Report	Bennett; Pinchbeck	Stadium: Victoria Ground; Attendance: 49,500

8 January 1951 Replay	Stoke City	1–0	Port Vale	Stoke-upon-Trent
	Bowyer	Report		Stadium: Victoria Ground; Attendance: 40,977

== Squad statistics ==
=== Appearances and goals ===
Key to positions: GK – Goalkeeper; FB – Full back; HB – Half back; FW – Forward

No.	Pos	Nat	Player	Total		Third Division South		FA Cup	
No.	Pos	Nat	Player	Apps	Goals	Apps	Goals	Apps	Goals
	GK	(England) ENG	George Heppell	17	0	17	0	0	0
	GK	(England) ENG	Ray King	33	0	29	0	4	0
	FB	(England) ENG	John Abbotts	3	0	3	0	0	0
	FB	(England) ENG	Garth Butler	5	0	5	0	0	0
	FB	(England) ENG	Lol Hamlett	49	0	45	0	4	0
	FB	(England) ENG	Reg Potts	25	0	23	0	2	0
	FB	(England) ENG	Stan Turner	7	0	6	0	1	0
	HB	(England) ENG	Tommy Cheadle	36	0	32	0	4	0
	HB	(England) ENG	Basil Hayward	26	0	25	0	1	0
	HB	(England) ENG	Albert Leake	1	0	1	0	0	0
	HB	(England) ENG	Alan Martin	46	5	42	5	4	0
	HB	(England) ENG	Roy Sproson	10	0	10	0	0	0
	HB	(Northern Ireland) NIR	Jimmy Todd	8	0	8	0	0	0
	FW	(England) ENG	Walter Aveyard	37	10	33	7	4	3
	FW	(England) ENG	Len Barber	14	7	14	7	0	0
	FW	(England) ENG	John Cunliffe	8	1	8	1	0	0
	FW	(England) ENG	Alan Bennett	31	3	28	2	3	1
	FW	(England) ENG	Ken Griffiths	9	2	8	2	1	0
	FW	(England) ENG	Mick Hulligan	50	8	46	7	4	1
	FW	(England) ENG	Roland Lewis	6	0	6	0	0	0
	FW	(England) ENG	Stan Palk	49	6	45	6	4	0
	FW	(England) ENG	Syd Peppitt	11	3	11	3	0	0
	FW	(England) ENG	Cliff Pinchbeck	34	19	30	16	4	3
Players who featured but departed the club during the season:
	HB	(England) ENG	Bill McGarry	35	2	31	2	4	0

=== Top scorers ===
Place	Position	Nation	Name	Third Division South	FA Cup	Total
1	FW	England	Cliff Pinchbeck	16	3	19
2	FW	England	Walter Aveyard	7	3	10
3	FW	England	Mick Hulligan	7	1	8
4	FW	England	Len Barber	7	0	7
5	FW	England	Stan Palk	6	0	6
6	HB	England	Alan Martin	5	0	5
7	FW	England	Syd Peppitt	3	0	3
–	FW	England	Alan Bennett	2	1	3
9	HB	England	Bill McGarry	2	0	2
–	FW	England	Ken Griffiths	2	0	2
11	FW	England	John Cunliffe	1	0	1
–	–	–	Own goals	2	0	2
			TOTALS	60	5	65

== Transfers ==
=== Transfers in ===
Date from	Position	Nationality	Name	From	Fee	Ref.
May 1950	FW	ENG	Syd Peppitt	Stoke City	£4,000	
May 1950	FW	ENG	Stan Smith	Stoke City	Free transfer	
May 1950	FW	ENG	Pat Willdigg	Stoke City	Free transfer	

=== Transfers out ===
Date from	Position	Nationality	Name	To	Fee	Ref.
March 1951	HB	ENG	Bill McGarry	Huddersfield Town	£12,000	
Summer 1951	FW	ENG	Syd Peppitt	Worcester City	Released	
1951	FW	ENG	Derek Tomkinson	Burton Albion	Free transfer	
