= Len Barber =

English footballer

Personal information
- Full name: Leonard Barber
- Date of birth: 3 July 1929
- Place of birth: Stoke-on-Trent, England
- Date of death: February 1988 (age 58)
- Place of death: Stoke-on-Trent, England
- Position: Forward

Youth career
- Bury

Senior career*
Years	Team	Apps	(Gls)
1947–1955	Port Vale	47	(12)
- Northwich Victoria
- Wellington Town
- * Club domestic league appearances and goals

Leonard Barber (3 July 1929 – February 1988) was an English footballer who played as a forward for Port Vale in the Football League. He played a minor role in the club's Third Division North title-winning campaign in 1953–54.

== Career ==
Barber played for Bury before joining Port Vale in June 1947. He made five Third Division South appearances for Gordon Hodgson's "Valiants" in 1949–50, and scored his first senior goal on 29 October, in a 3–0 win over Brighton & Hove Albion at the Old Recreation Ground. He played 14 games at the end of the 1950–51 season, scoring seven goals. He would have had a higher goal ratio if it wasn't for misfortune, as during a game against Crystal Palace on 9 April 1951, he managed to score four goals. However, the game was abandoned after an hour's play due to excessive mud. It was speculated that Barber's natural ability to play in thick mud would have earned him even more goals during that particular game. He made 18 appearances in 1951–52, but only found the net twice. He played eight games in 1953–54, scoring two goals, as Freddie Steele's side won the Third Division North title. He featured twice in the Second Division in 1954–55, before he left Vale Park and was transferred to Cheshire County League side Northwich Victoria in July 1955. He later signed for Wellington Town.

== Post-retirement ==
Barber went on to run a pub called 'The Labour in Vain' in Milton, Staffordshire.

== Career statistics ==
Appearances and goals by club, season and competition
Club	Season	League			FA Cup		Total	
Club	Season	Division	Apps	Goals	Apps	Goals	Apps	Goals
Port Vale	1949–50	Third Division South	5	1	0	0	5	1
Port Vale	1950–51	Third Division South	14	7	0	0	14	7
Port Vale	1951–52	Third Division South	18	2	0	0	18	2
Port Vale	1952–53	Third Division North	0	0	0	0	0	0
Port Vale	1953–54	Third Division North	8	2	0	0	8	2
Port Vale	1954–55	Second Division	2	0	0	0	2	0
Port Vale	Total		47	12	0	0	47	12

== Honours ==
Port Vale

- Football League Third Division North: 1953–54
