= Alan Martin (footballer, born 1923) =

English footballer (1923–2004)

Personal information
- Full name: John Alan Martin
- Date of birth: 23 November 1923
- Place of birth: Smallthorne, England
- Date of death: 2004 (aged 80–81)
- Positions: Half-back; inside forward

Youth career
- Nettlebank Villa

Senior career*
Years	Team	Apps	(Gls)
1941–1951	Port Vale	169	(28)
1951–1955	Stoke City	104	(6)
1955–1957	Bangor City		
1957–1959	Port Vale	19	(0)
- Northwich Victoria
Total		292	(34)

Managerial career
- Northwich Victoria
- * Club domestic league appearances and goals

John Alan Martin (23 November 1923 – 2004) was an English footballer who played as a half-back and inside-forward. A pacey and intelligent player, he scored 34 goals in 292 league appearances in eleven years in the Football League.

He began his career at Port Vale, turning professional in December 1942. He was sold to Stoke City in exchange for Albert Mullard and £10,000 in September 1951, and played First Division football for the "Potters". He spent 1955 to 1957 at Bangor City before re-joining Port Vale in July 1957. He helped the "Valiants" to win the Fourth Division title in 1958–59 before moving on to Northwich Victoria.

== Career ==
Martin joined Port Vale in February 1941 as an amateur, signing professional forms in December 1942. He played 14 Third Division South games in 1946–47. He scored his first senior goals at the Old Recreation Ground in a 4–1 win over Ipswich Town on 1 November 1947, and was an ever-present throughout the 1947–48 campaign, scoring eight goals. He again played every minute of the 1948–49 season, and also bagged seven goals. He scored eight goals in 28 games in 1949–50, and five goals in 46 games in 1950–51. Manager Gordon Hodgson died in June 1951, and his replacement, Ivor Powell, sold Martin to Potteries derby rivals to Stoke City in exchange for Albert Mullard and £10,000 in September 1951. This was a club record for Stoke.

Martin scored twice in 34 First Division games in 1951–52, as the "Potters" narrowly avoided relegation under Bob McGrory. However, relegation was not avoided in 1952–53 under new boss Frank Taylor, with Martin scoring four goals in 30 appearances. He made 38 Second Division appearances in 1953–54 but featured just six times in 1954–55, and left the Victoria Ground for Welsh club Bangor City.

Martin returned to Burslem to re-sign for Port Vale on non-contract terms in July 1957; the club were now playing at Vale Park and managed by Norman Low, though were still in the Third Division South. He featured just three times in 1957–58, but made 16 appearances in the Fourth Division title-winning season of 1958–59. He then left the club to become player-manager of Northwich Victoria, and also spent time coaching the Vale juniors.

== Style of play ==
Former teammate Roy Sproson said that: "Alan's assets were his pace and good control. He was extremely good on the ball and a highly intelligent player too."

== Career statistics ==
Appearances and goals by club, season and competition
Club	Season	League			FA Cup		Total	
Club	Season	Division	Apps	Goals	Apps	Goals	Apps	Goals
Port Vale	1946–47	Third Division South	14	0	0	0	14	0
Port Vale	1947–48	Third Division South	42	8	1	0	43	8
Port Vale	1948–49	Third Division South	42	6	1	1	43	7
Port Vale	1949–50	Third Division South	24	7	4	1	28	8
Port Vale	1950–51	Third Division South	42	5	4	0	46	5
Port Vale	1951–52	Third Division South	5	2	0	0	5	2
Port Vale	Total		169	28	10	2	179	30
Stoke City	1951–52	First Division	34	2	4	0	38	2
Stoke City	1952–53	First Division	29	4	1	0	30	4
Stoke City	1953–54	Second Division	38	0	3	0	41	0
Stoke City	1954–55	Second Division	3	0	3	0	6	0
Stoke City	Total		104	6	11	0	115	6
Port Vale	1957–58	Third Division South	3	0	0	0	3	0
Port Vale	1958–59	Fourth Division	16	0	0	0	16	0
Port Vale	Total		19	0	0	0	19	0
Career total			292	34	21	3	313	37

== Honours ==
Port Vale

- Football League Fourth Division: 1958–59
