= Jimmy Todd =

Northern Irish footballer

Personal information
- Full name: James Todd
- Date of birth: 19 March 1921
- Place of birth: Belfast, Northern Ireland
- Date of death: 21 December 2007 (aged 86)
- Place of death: Stoke-on-Trent, England
- Height: 5 ft 6 1/2 in (1.69 m)
- Position: Half-back

Youth career
- Ards

Senior career*
Years	Team	Apps	(Gls)
1944–1946	Blackpool	0	(0)
1946–1953	Port Vale	145	(0)
- Wellington Town
- Stafford Rangers

International career
1946–1947	Ireland (Victory)	2	(0)
- * Club domestic league appearances and goals

James Todd (19 March 1921 – 21 December 2007) was a footballer from Northern Ireland who played for Port Vale between 1946 and 1953. A half-back, he was "a real terrier type who used to fight for the ball all the time".

== Career ==
Todd began his playing career with Ards, before playing for the Royal Air Force and then Blackpool, before moving to Port Vale for a then-club-record four-figure fee in October 1946, on the recommendation of Stanley Matthews. He made 31 appearances in the Third Division South in 1946–47, 24 appearances in 1947–48, and 11 appearances in 1948–49. Having slipped out of the first-team picture at the Old Recreation Ground, he returned to play 41 games in 1949–50. However, he played only eight games in 1950–51, becoming a fringe player at newly constructed Vale Park. In the summer, manager Gordon Hodgson died, and following Ivor Powell's brief tenure, Freddie Steele took charge of the club in November. Todd played 25 times in 1951–52, and then made 11 league appearances in 1952–53, as Vale finished as runners-up in the Third Division North. Having played 146 league and eleven FA Cup games for the "Valiants", he was given a free transfer to Cheshire County League side Wellington Town in May 1953. Todd later played for Stafford Rangers.

== Career statistics ==
Appearances and goals by club, season and competition
Club	Season	League			FA Cup		Total	
Club	Season	Division	Apps	Goals	Apps	Goals	Apps	Goals
Blackpool	1945–46		0	0	4	0	4	0
Port Vale	1946–47	Third Division South	30	0	5	0	35	0
Port Vale	1947–48	Third Division South	24	0	0	0	24	0
Port Vale	1948–49	Third Division South	11	0	0	0	11	0
Port Vale	1949–50	Third Division South	37	0	4	0	41	0
Port Vale	1950–51	Third Division South	8	0	0	0	8	0
Port Vale	1951–52	Third Division South	24	0	1	0	25	0
Port Vale	1952–53	Third Division North	11	0	1	0	12	0
Port Vale	Total		145	0	15	0	160	0
