= 1948–49 Port Vale F.C. season =

Port Vale F.C.
1948–49 season
- Chairman: William Holdcroft
- Manager: Gordon Hodgson
- Stadium: Old Recreation Ground
- Football League Third Division South: 13th (39 points)
- FA Cup: First Round (eliminated by Notts County)
- Top goalscorer: League: Walter Aveyard (13); All: Walter Aveyard (13)
- Highest home attendance: 18,497 vs. Aldershot, 28 August 1948
- Lowest home attendance: 7,738 vs. Millwall, 18 December 1948
- Average home league attendance: 12,069
- Biggest win: 3–0 (three games)
- Biggest defeat: 1–4 (twice)
Home colours

The 1948–49 season was Port Vale's 37th season of football in the English Football League and their fourth full season in the Third Division South. Under manager Gordon Hodgson and chairman William Holdcroft. After promising early form, Vale's promotion hopes fizzled out into a mid-table 13th‑place finish, accumulating 39 points from 42 league matches (14 wins, 11 draws, 17 losses).

In the FA Cup, Vale were eliminated in the First Round, ending hopes of a cup run early in the season. Walter Aveyard emerged as both league and season top scorer, netting 13 goals. The average home attendance stood at 12,069, with the lowest turnout recorded at 7,738 for the Millwall match on 18 December 1948. Vale's largest victories were 3–0 wins on three separate occasions, while their heaviest defeats came by 4–1 scorelines twice.

Overall, the season proved steady but unspectacular, as early promotion ambitions gave way to the realities of inconsistent form and the club's decision to sell Bill Pointon for a then‑club record fee in search of financial and on‑field balance.

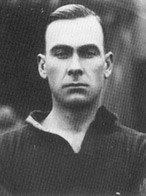
Manager Gordon Hodgson during his playing days.

== Overview ==
=== Third Division South ===
The pre-season saw the club attempt to sign Huddersfield Town's star forward Peter Doherty when this failed Gordon Hodgson instead signed Liverpool left-wing duo Stan Palk and Mick Hulligan for £10,000. Striker Walter Aveyard was also signed from Birmingham City, despite his belief that a leg injury had finished him. Fans were convinced promotion to the Second Division was possible, as was chairman William Holdcroft. So, there was a surge in season ticket sales.

The season started with seven points from the opening four games, leaving the club top of the table. The season-high 18,497 fans that turned up for a 3–0 win over Aldershot were impressed by the skill of the three new signings. This followed on from a 3–0 win over Reading the previous week. They did lose by a goal to nil at Brighton & Hove Albion on 4 September, though Aveyard played most of the game as a passenger after sustaining an injury. Two days later, Vale beat league leaders Swindon Town by two clear goals. The club's good form continued to the end of September, despite the sale of Walter Keeley to Accrington Stanley for £1,500 – who had found himself relegated to the sidelines by Hulligan's good performances. After this Hulligan broke his ankle, whilst other injuries also hit the squad. Six weeks of six defeats in seven games followed, leaving Vale sixth from bottom. During this spell, Joe Dale was offloaded to Witton Albion as Hodgson attempted to fill the gaps in the first-team with young reserves. Winning three games on the trot, the Vale ended this bad spell and kept three clean sheets after Tommy Cheadle was moved to the forward lines to add weight to the attack.

Over the Christmas period, talk was dominated by 'The Wembley of the North', which had been projected as an 80,000-capacity stadium, but now it was planned as a 40,000-capacity ground with room for future expansion. Finding just fifty members for the '100 club', the financing was helped by a £8,000 grant from The Football Association. In January, the club initiated a fire-sale of players: Bill Pointon went to Queens Park Rangers for a then-club record five-figure fee, whilst Harry Hubbick was sold to Rochdale for around £1,000. Meanwhile, the club transfer listed Palk, Aveyard, and Eric Eastwood (who all lived outside north Staffordshire); whilst Hulligan returned from injury. A two-month run without a win followed, in which Hodgson again experimented with the first XI. This run finally ended with a 1–0 win over sixth-placed Notts County on 9 April. Nine days later at Ashton Gate, goalkeeper Harry Prince was given a chance in place of injured regular George Heppell, who embarrassed himself by attempting to punch a 40 yards (37 m) punt from Stone, only to miss the ball entirely and thereby concede the equaliser. Later in the month, Hodgson signed George King from Hull City for a four-figure fee. King scored twice in his debut against Torquay United. The match was marred by a Plainmoor spectator hitting the referee on the head with a stone after he disallowed a penalty.

They finished a disappointing 13th, boasting just 39 points. They had scored twelve fewer goals than in the previous campaign. However, their defensive record was identical. Harry Prince's move to Stafford Rangers was the only significant departure of the summer.

=== Finances ===
On the financial side, a large transfer credit helped the club record a gross profit of £7,120. Gate receipts had declined to £25,831, whilst wages had risen to £16,095. The Burslem Supporters Club put forward a donation of £600, and the club issued 22,000 new five shilling shares to help with the New Ground Fund.

=== FA Cup ===
In the FA Cup, Vale were knocked out in the first round by Notts County at Meadow Lane in front of 36,514 spectators.

== Results ==
=== Football League Third Division South ===
==== League table ====
Pos	Team	Pld	W	D	L	GF	GA	GAv	Pts
11	Notts County	42	19	5	18	102	68	1.500	43
12	Exeter City	42	15	10	17	63	76	0.829	40
13	Port Vale	42	14	11	17	51	54	0.944	39
14	Walsall	42	15	8	19	56	64	0.875	38
15	Newport County	42	14	9	19	68	92	0.739	37

==== Results by matchday ====
Round	1	2	3	4	5	6	7	8	9	10	11	12	13	14	15	16	17	18	19	20	21	22	23	24	25	26	27	28	29	30	31	32	33	34	35	36	37	38	39	40	41	42
Ground	A	H	H	A	A	H	H	A	A	H	A	H	A	H	A	H	A	H	H	H	A	A	H	H	A	H	A	A	H	A	H	A	H	A	A	H	H	A	A	H	A	H
Result	D	W	W	W	L	W	L	W	D	D	L	L	D	L	L	L	L	W	W	W	L	W	W	L	D	W	D	L	D	L	L	L	L	D	D	W	W	L	D	W	L	D
Position	9	1	2	1	3	1	3	2	2	5	6	8	10	12	15	17	17	16	15	11	13	9	9	10	10	11	11	11	11	12	12	12	13	13	13	13	12	12	12	12	12	13
Points	1	3	5	7	7	9	9	11	12	13	13	13	14	14	14	14	14	16	18	20	20	22	24	24	25	27	28	28	29	29	29	29	29	30	31	33	35	35	36	38	38	39

Source: Statto
A = Away; H = Home; W = Win; D = Draw; L = Loss

==== Matches ====
21 August 1948 1	Millwall	1–1	Port Vale	New Cross, London
		Report	Aveyard	Stadium: The Den; Attendance: 32,122

23 August 1948 2	Port Vale	3–0	Reading	Hanley
	Aveyard; Hulligan	Report		Stadium: Old Recreation Ground; Attendance: 17,394

28 August 1948 3	Port Vale	3–0	Aldershot	Hanley
	Hulligan; Dale	Report		Stadium: Old Recreation Ground; Attendance: 18,497

1 September 1948 4	Reading	1–2	Port Vale	Reading, Berkshire
		Report	Palk; Martin	Stadium: Elm Park; Attendance: 13,955

4 September 1948 5	Brighton & Hove Albion	1–0	Port Vale	Hove
		Report		Stadium: Goldstone Ground; Attendance: 20,383

6 September 1948 6	Port Vale	2–0	Swindon Town	Hanley
	Palk; Pointon	Report		Stadium: Old Recreation Ground; Attendance: 17,581; Referee: R.L. Aldridge

11 September 1948 7	Port Vale	0–2	Southend United	Hanley
		Report		Stadium: Old Recreation Ground; Attendance: 16,592

15 September 1948 8	Swindon Town	0–2	Port Vale	Swindon
		Report	Allen; Aveyard	Stadium: County Ground; Attendance: 16,894; Referee: G. Clark

18 September 1948 9	Northampton Town	2–2	Port Vale	Northampton
		Report	Allen; Aveyard	Stadium: County Cricket Ground; Attendance: 9,964

25 September 1948 10	Port Vale	0–0	Norwich City	Hanley
		Report		Stadium: Old Recreation Ground; Attendance: 15,361

2 October 1948 11	Exeter City	2–1	Port Vale	Exeter
	Bartholomew	Report	Martin	Stadium: St James Park; Attendance: 10,672; Referee: B.M.Griffiths; Assistant referees: G.W.Pullin, C.P.Jacobs.

9 October 1948 12	Port Vale	0–2	Swansea Town	Hanley
		Report		Stadium: Old Recreation Ground; Attendance: 17,888

16 October 1948 13	Newport County	2–2	Port Vale	Newport, Wales
	H. Williams; Parker	Report	Aveyard	Stadium: Somerton Park; Attendance: 10,037

23 October 1948 14	Port Vale	1–2	Ipswich Town	Hanley
	Aveyard	Report		Stadium: Old Recreation Ground; Attendance: 11,424

30 October 1948 15	Bournemouth & Boscombe Athletic	2–0	Port Vale	Bournemouth
		Report		Stadium: Dean Court; Attendance: 18,436

6 November 1948 16	Port Vale	0–2	Walsall	Hanley
		Report		Stadium: Old Recreation Ground; Attendance: 11,559

13 November 1948 17	Notts County	2–1	Port Vale	Nottingham
		Report	Aveyard	Stadium: Meadow Lane; Attendance: 29,332

20 November 1948 18	Port Vale	2–0	Bristol Rovers	Hanley
	Cheadle; Palk	Report		Stadium: Old Recreation Ground; Attendance: 10,342

18 December 1948 19	Port Vale	1–0	Millwall	Hanley
	Pointon	Report		Stadium: Old Recreation Ground; Attendance: 7,738

25 December 1948 20	Port Vale	3–0	Leyton Orient	Hanley
	Allen; Pointon; Hubbick	Report		Stadium: Old Recreation Ground; Attendance: 9,480

27 December 1948 21	Leyton Orient	2–0	Port Vale	Leyton, East London
		Report		Stadium: Brisbane Road; Attendance: 8,953

1 January 1949 22	Aldershot	0–1	Port Vale	Aldershot
		Report	Pointon	Stadium: Recreation Ground; Attendance: 4,510

8 January 1949 23	Port Vale	3–1	Watford	Hanley
	Aveyard; Allen	Report	Thomas	Stadium: Old Recreation Ground; Attendance: 8,681

15 January 1949 24	Port Vale	3–4	Brighton & Hove Albion	Hanley
	Martin; Pointon; Aveyard	Report		Stadium: Old Recreation Ground; Attendance: 9,562

22 January 1949 25	Southend United	0–0	Port Vale	Southend-on-Sea
		Report		Stadium: Southend Stadium; Attendance: 9,713

5 February 1949 26	Port Vale	1–0	Northampton Town	Hanley
	Allen	Report		Stadium: Old Recreation Ground; Attendance: 9,369

12 February 1949 27	Crystal Palace	1–1	Port Vale	Selhurst, Croydon
		Report	Cheadle	Stadium: Selhurst Park; Attendance: 12,409

19 February 1949 28	Norwich City	2–0	Port Vale	Norwich
		Report		Stadium: Carrow Road; Attendance: 26,323

26 February 1949 29	Port Vale	1–1	Exeter City	Hanley
	(og.)	Report	Durrant	Stadium: Old Recreation Ground; Attendance: 8,437; Referee: Sandy Griffiths

5 March 1949 30	Swansea Town	3–1	Port Vale	Swansea
		Report	Allen	Stadium: Vetch Field; Attendance: 13,769

12 March 1949 31	Port Vale	1–2	Newport County	Hanley
	Hulligan	Report	Carr	Stadium: Old Recreation Ground; Attendance: 9,487

19 March 1949 32	Ipswich Town	4–1	Port Vale	Ipswich
		Report	Allen	Stadium: Portman Road; Attendance: 10,722

26 March 1949 33	Port Vale	0–2	Bournemouth & Boscombe Athletic	Hanley
		Report		Stadium: Old Recreation Ground; Attendance: 8,560

30 March 1949 34	Torquay United	0–0	Port Vale	Torquay
		Report		Stadium: Plainmoor; Attendance: 6,483

2 April 1949 35	Walsall	1–1	Port Vale	Walsall
		Report	Martin	Stadium: Fellows Park; Attendance: 9,767

9 April 1949 36	Port Vale	1–0	Notts County	Hanley
	Martin	Report		Stadium: Old Recreation Ground; Attendance: 12,198

15 April 1949 37	Port Vale	4–2	Bristol City	Hanley
	Allen; Martin; Hulligan	Report		Stadium: Old Recreation Ground; Attendance: 13,571

16 April 1949 38	Bristol Rovers	4–1	Port Vale	Bristol
		Report	Aveyard	Stadium: Eastville Stadium; Attendance: 15,477

18 April 1949 39	Bristol City	1–1	Port Vale	Ashton Gate, Bristol
		Report	Palk	Stadium: Ashton Gate; Attendance: 11,094

23 April 1949 40	Port Vale	3–1	Torquay United	Hanley
	King; McGarry	Report		Stadium: Old Recreation Ground; Attendance: 11,914

30 April 1949 41	Watford	2–1	Port Vale	Watford
	Davies	Report	Allen	Stadium: Vicarage Road; Attendance: 6,316

7 May 1949 42	Port Vale	0–0	Crystal Palace	Hanley
		Report		Stadium: Old Recreation Ground; Attendance: 7,821

=== FA Cup ===
27 November 1948 R1	Notts County	2–1	Port Vale	Nottingham
		Report	Martin	Stadium: Meadow Lane; Attendance: 36,514

== Squad statistics ==
=== Appearances and goals ===
Key to positions: GK – Goalkeeper; FB – Full back; HB – Half back; FW – Forward

No.	Pos	Nat	Player	Total		Third Division South		FA Cup	
No.	Pos	Nat	Player	Apps	Goals	Apps	Goals	Apps	Goals
	GK	(England) ENG	Ray Hancock	3	0	3	0	0	0
	GK	(England) ENG	George Heppell	38	0	37	0	1	0
	GK	(England) ENG	Harry Prince	2	0	2	0	0	0
	FB	(England) ENG	Garth Butler	34	0	33	0	1	0
	FB	(England) ENG	Jim Elsby	1	0	1	0	0	0
	FB	(England) ENG	Reg Potts	19	0	19	0	0	0
	HB	(England) ENG	Tommy Cheadle	23	2	22	2	1	0
	HB	(England) ENG	Eric Eastwood	4	0	4	0	0	0
	HB	(England) ENG	Basil Hayward	42	0	41	0	1	0
	HB	(England) ENG	Alan Martin	43	7	42	6	1	1
	HB	(England) ENG	Bill McGarry	41	1	40	1	1	0
	HB	(England) ENG	Wilf Smith	1	0	1	0	0	0
	HB	(Northern Ireland) NIR	Jimmy Todd	11	0	11	0	0	0
	FW	(England) ENG	Ronnie Allen	41	10	40	10	1	0
	FW	(England) ENG	Walter Aveyard	35	13	34	13	1	0
	FW	(England) ENG	Alan Bennett	1	0	1	0	0	0
	FW	(England) ENG	Mick Hulligan	28	5	28	5	0	0
	FW	(England) ENG	Bernard Jones	7	0	6	0	1	0
	FW	(England) ENG	George King	2	2	2	2	0	0
	FW	(England) ENG	George O'Neill	5	0	5	0	0	0
	FW	(England) ENG	Stan Palk	43	4	42	4	1	0
	FW	(England) ENG	Pat Raftery	2	0	2	0	0	0
	FW	(England) ENG	John Sherratt	2	0	2	0	0	0
	FW	(England) ENG	Lewis White	1	0	1	0	0	0
Players who featured but departed the club during the season:
	FB	(England) ENG	Harry Hubbick	21	1	20	1	1	0
	FW	(England) ENG	Joe Dale	6	1	6	1	0	0
	FW	(England) ENG	Bill Pointon	15	5	15	5	0	0
	FW	(England) ENG	Walter Keeley	2	0	2	0	0	0

=== Top scorers ===
Place	Position	Nation	Name	Third Division South	FA Cup	Total
1	FW	England	Walter Aveyard	13	0	13
2	FW	England	Ronnie Allen	10	0	10
3	HB	England	Alan Martin	6	1	7
4	FW	England	Bill Pointon	5	0	5
–	FW	England	Mick Hulligan	5	0	5
6	FW	England	Stan Palk	4	0	4
7	FW	England	George King	2	0	2
–	HB	England	Tommy Cheadle	2	0	2
9	FW	England	Harry Hubbick	1	0	1
–	HB	England	Bill McGarry	1	0	1
–	FW	England	Joe Dale	1	0	1
–	–	–	Own goals	1	0	1
			TOTALS	51	1	52

== Transfers ==
=== Transfers in ===
Date from	Position	Nationality	Name	From	Fee	Ref.
May 1948	GK	ENG	Ray Hancock	Bury	Free transfer	
June 1948	FW	ENG	Walter Aveyard	Birmingham City	Free transfer	
July 1948	FW	ENG	Mick Hulligan	Liverpool	£10,000	
July 1948	FW	ENG	Stan Palk	Liverpool	£10,000	
October 1948	FW	ENG	Bernard Jones	Longport	Free transfer	
November 1948	FW	ENG	George O'Neill	Ellesmere Port Town	Free transfer	
November 1948	FW	ENG	Pat Raftery	Ravensdale	Free transfer	
April 1949	FW	ENG	George King	Hull City	'four-figure fee'	

=== Transfers out ===
Date from	Position	Nationality	Name	To	Fee	Ref.
September 1948	FW	ENG	Walter Keeley	Accrington Stanley	£1,500	
October 1948	FW	ENG	Joe Dale	Witton Albion	'Cheshire League record fee'	
January 1949	FB	ENG	Harry Hubbick	Rochdale	£1,000	
January 1949	FW	ENG	Bill Pointon	Queens Park Rangers	'club record five-figure fee'	
May 1949	GK	ENG	Harry Prince	Stafford Rangers	Released	
July 1949	FB	SCO	Bob Pursell	Winsford United	Free transfer	
July 1949	FW	ENG	Lewis White	Winsford United	Free transfer	
Summer 1949	FW	ENG	George O'Neill		Released	
Summer 1949	FW	ENG	John Sherratt		Released	
