= 1951–52 Port Vale F.C. season =

Port Vale F.C.
1951–52 season
- Chairman: William Holdcroft
- Manager: Ivor Powell (until November); Freddie Steele (from 24 December)
- Stadium: Vale Park
- Football League Third Division South: 13th (43 points)
- FA Cup: First Round (eliminated by Colchester United)
- Top goalscorer: League: Albert Mullard (13); All: Albert Mullard (13)
- Highest home attendance: 17,860 vs. Brighton & Hove Albion, 12 January 1952
- Lowest home attendance: 4,136 vs. Aldershot, 8 December 1951
- Average home league attendance: 11,225
- Biggest win: 3–0 and 4–1
- Biggest defeat: 1–5 vs. Reading, 20 February 1952
Home colours

The 1951–52 season was Port Vale's 40th season of football in the English Football League, and their seventh full season in the Third Division South. It saw a turbulent transition in both leadership and form. Manager Ivor Powell began the season, but with Vale adrift at the foot of the table, he was dismissed in November. On Christmas Eve, Freddie Steele — a former England international — was appointed player‑manager, engineering a remarkable recovery using largely the squad he inherited, guiding Vale to a 13th‑place finish with 43 points from 46 matches.

Vale's FA Cup campaign was short‑lived, ending in the First Round with an early exit at the hands of Colchester United. Albert Mullard, signed from Stoke City in September as part of a player-plus‑cash exchange, emerged as both league and season top scorer with 13 goals, his contribution growing in significance as the season progressed. Support remained steady at Vale Park, with an average home attendance of 11,225, peaking and dipping to a low of 4,136 versus Aldershot in December 1951. The season also witnessed key transfer moves, including the departures of Cliff Pinchbeck and Walter Aveyard, both impacting the squad depth mid‑campaign.

Steele's man-management affected strategy and performance, establishing the "Iron/Steele Curtain" defence.

== Overview ==
=== Third Division South ===
The pre-season saw 578 seats installed on the Railway Terrace, bringing the seated capacity of Vale Park to 1,010. No signings of note were made. However, transfer-listed Cliff Pinchbeck failed to turn up for pre-season training, citing illness.

Thirty seconds into their opening game with Reading and they were behind, the Vale went on to lose 2–0. A six-game unbeaten streak followed, with just three goals conceded, though only five goals were scored. On 21 August, Vale held Southend United to a goalless draw despite Mick Hulligan being knocked unconscious twice. On his return to Burslem, Pinchbeck scored a brace to salvage a point against Bournemouth & Boscombe Athletic. Vale then sold Alan Martin to rivals Stoke City for £10,000 and Albert Mullard, the money going towards fixing the drainage problem at Vale Park. The sale was criticized by supporters, though they soon warmed to Mullard, who became the club's top scorer. The club failed to sign transfer target Dennis Wilshaw from Wolverhampton Wanderers, and Garth Butler was forced to retire with a knee injury. Results turned against the team, as they went on a run of 13 games without a win, though all five of the home games on the 'wide open' Vale Park pitch were draws (all eight away matches were losses). On 3 November, a 3–1 defeat at Crystal Palace sent Vale to the bottom of the table. Manager Ivor Powell attempted to sign players but was deterred by the high transfer prices, and so instead continually reshuffled the first XI. Powell's contract was terminated on 22 November, his team bottom of the table. Trainer Ken Fish took temporary charge of first-team affairs. Roy Sproson and Ray King would later say the sacking came as no surprise, saying Powell 'ruled by fear', 'used to treat the players like kids' and it was a 'complete relief' to find him dismissed. Pinchbeck was also offloaded, sold to Northampton Town for 'an undisclosed sum'.

On 8 December, Vale recorded a surprise 4–1 win over Aldershot. Yet the side then went another eight games without a win. Freddie Steele was appointed player-manager on Christmas Eve, signing the former England international meant Vale had to pay Mansfield Town a four-figure fee. The former Stoke City forward was still very much a goalscorer, having described his record of 44 goals in 66 games for the "Stags" as "not bad for an old man!". In January, half-back Norman Hallam returned to the club. On 12 January, 17,860 turned up to witness a 1–1 draw in Steele's debut against second-placed Brighton & Hove Albion, the first of a five-match unbeaten run that took Vale off the foot of the table. A fortnight later Vale travelled to Plainmoor, where Steele took the ball from his own half to score the winner past Torquay United. On 9 February, Vale beat Gillingham 1–0, in what was the first of a club record 13 game-winning run at home.

A 5–1 hammering at Elm Park from Reading failed to prevent the Vale from going on to another eight-game unbeaten run. Steele accomplished this without any new signings; in fact, he sold Walter Aveyard to Accrington Stanley for a four-figure fee in April. Their run ended with a 3–0 defeat at Fellows Park to bottom-placed Walsall when Tommy Cheadle and Jimmy Todd were both injured. Vale finished their final five games with three wins.

They finished 13th with 43 points and a strong defence, but the lowest goals scored tally in the division. They had lost just the one game at Vale Park, back on the opening day.

=== Finances ===
On the financial side, the club announced a profit of £4,403 due to a profit on transfers of £16,750. Gross receipts had fallen to £27,133, whilst wages had risen by £3,500 to £23,511. Steele seemed to be happy with the players he inherited, as he retained 31 professionals, the only departures being George Heppell to Witton Albion, Stan Palk to Worcester City, and Lol Hamlett to Congleton Town.

=== FA Cup ===
In the FA Cup, Vale fell at the first hurdle to Colchester United at Layer Road, losing 3–1.

== Results ==
=== Football League Third Division South ===
==== League table ====
Pos	Team	Pld	W	D	L	GF	GA	GAv	Pts	Promotion
11	Torquay United	46	17	10	19	86	98	0.878	44	
12	Aldershot	46	18	8	20	78	89	0.876	44	
13	Port Vale	46	14	15	17	50	66	0.758	43	Transferred to the Third Division North
14	Bournemouth & Boscombe Athletic	46	16	10	20	69	75	0.920	42	
15	Bristol City	46	15	12	19	58	69	0.841	42	

==== Results by matchday ====
Round	1	2	3	4	5	6	7	8	9	10	11	12	13	14	15	16	17	18	19	20	21	22	23	24	25	26	27	28	29	30	31	32	33	34	35	36	37	38	39	40	41	42	43	44	45	46
Ground	H	A	H	H	A	H	H	A	H	A	A	A	H	A	H	A	H	A	A	H	A	H	A	H	A	A	H	H	A	H	H	A	A	A	H	A	H	H	H	A	A	H	H	A	A	H
Result	L	D	D	D	W	W	D	L	D	L	L	L	D	L	D	L	D	L	L	W	L	D	L	D	L	L	D	D	W	W	W	L	D	W	W	D	W	W	W	D	L	W	W	L	L	W
Position	21	19	22	21	17	10	9	16	16	17	19	20	22	23	23	24	23	24	24	23	23	23	23	24	24	24	24	23	23	24	23	23	22	20	19	20	18	13	14	13	15	15	13	16	17	12
Points	0	1	2	3	5	7	8	8	9	9	9	9	10	10	11	11	12	12	12	14	14	15	15	16	16	16	18	19	20	22	24	24	25	27	29	30	32	34	36	37	37	39	41	41	41	43

Source: Statto
A = Away; H = Home; W = Win; D = Draw; L = Loss

==== Matches ====
18 August 1951 1	Port Vale	0–2	Reading	Burslem
		Report		Stadium: Vale Park; Attendance: 16,663

21 August 1951 2	Southend United	0–0	Port Vale	Southend-on-Sea
		Report		Stadium: Southend Stadium; Attendance: 9,371

27 August 1951 3	Port Vale	0–0	Southend United	Burslem
		Report		Stadium: Vale Park; Attendance: 10,550

1 September 1951 4	Port Vale	1–1	Watford	Burslem
	Leake	Report	Jones	Stadium: Vale Park; Attendance: 11,790

5 September 1951 5	Bournemouth & Boscombe Athletic	0–1	Port Vale	Bournemouth
		Report	Martin	Stadium: Dean Court; Attendance: 11,455

8 September 1951 6	Port Vale	1–0	Bristol City	Burslem
	Martin	Report		Stadium: Vale Park; Attendance: 14,472

10 September 1951 7	Port Vale	2–2	Bournemouth & Boscombe Athletic	Burslem
	Pinchbeck	Report		Stadium: Vale Park; Attendance: 12,601

15 September 1951 8	Ipswich Town	2–0	Port Vale	Ipswich
		Report		Stadium: Portman Road; Attendance: 9,287

22 September 1951 9	Port Vale	2–2	Torquay United	Burslem
	Mullard; Sproson	Report		Stadium: Vale Park; Attendance: 14,201

27 September 1951 10	Northampton Town	3–1	Port Vale	Northampton
		Report	Mullard	Stadium: County Cricket Ground; Attendance: 8,082

29 September 1951 11	Gillingham	4–2	Port Vale	Gillingham, Kent
		Report	Mullard (pen.); Pinchbeck	Stadium: Priestfield Stadium; Attendance: 14,354

6 October 1951 12	Plymouth Argyle	3–0	Port Vale	Plymouth
	Astall; Govan; Rattray	Report		Stadium: Home Park; Attendance: 19,161

13 October 1951 13	Port Vale	0–0	Norwich City	Burslem
		Report		Stadium: Vale Park; Attendance: 10,576

20 October 1951 14	Exeter City	2–0	Port Vale	Exeter
	Smart; Mackay	Report		Stadium: St James Park; Attendance: 7,834

27 October 1951 15	Port Vale	1–1	Colchester United	Burslem
	Bennett	Report	Cutting	Stadium: Vale Park; Attendance: 9,488

3 November 1951 16	Crystal Palace	3–1	Port Vale	Selhurst, Croydon
		Report	Pinchbeck	Stadium: Selhurst Park; Attendance: 16,401

10 November 1951 17	Port Vale	2–2	Swindon Town	Burslem
	Mullard 12'; Barber 61'	Report	Owen 79', 88'	Stadium: Vale Park; Attendance: 9,142; Referee: R.A. Mann

17 November 1951 18	Leyton Orient	2–0	Port Vale	Leyton, East London
		Report		Stadium: Brisbane Road; Attendance: 7,674

1 December 1951 19	Shrewsbury Town	2–0	Port Vale	Shrewsbury
		Report		Stadium: Gay Meadow; Attendance: 8,690

8 December 1951 20	Port Vale	4–1	Aldershot	Burslem
	Mullard; Hulligan; Cunliffe	Report		Stadium: Vale Park; Attendance: 4,136

15 December 1951 21	Brighton & Hove Albion	2–1	Port Vale	Hove
		Report	Mullard	Stadium: Goldstone Ground; Attendance: 14,218

22 December 1951 22	Port Vale	0–0	Northampton Town	Burslem
		Report		Stadium: Vale Park; Attendance: 8,973

25 December 1951 23	Bristol Rovers	4–1	Port Vale	Bristol
		Report	(og.)	Stadium: Eastville Stadium; Attendance: 16,691

26 December 1951 24	Port Vale	1–1	Bristol Rovers	Burslem
	Barber	Report		Stadium: Vale Park; Attendance: 16,734

29 December 1951 25	Watford	2–0	Port Vale	Watford
	Eggleston; Haigh	Report		Stadium: Vicarage Road; Attendance: 9,023

5 January 1952 26	Bristol City	1–0	Port Vale	Ashton Gate, Bristol
		Report		Stadium: Ashton Gate; Attendance: 17,598

12 January 1952 27	Port Vale	1–1	Brighton & Hove Albion	Burslem
	Mullard (pen.)	Report		Stadium: Vale Park; Attendance: 17,860

19 January 1952 28	Port Vale	0–0	Ipswich Town	Burslem
		Report		Stadium: Vale Park; Attendance: 10,592

26 January 1952 29	Torquay United	2–3	Port Vale	Torquay
		Report	Griffiths; Mullard (pen.); Steele	Stadium: Plainmoor; Attendance: 5,588

9 February 1952 30	Port Vale	1–0	Gillingham	Burslem
	Cunliffe	Report		Stadium: Vale Park; Attendance: 12,768

16 February 1952 31	Port Vale	1–0	Plymouth Argyle	Burslem
	Mullard	Report		Stadium: Vale Park; Attendance: 10,572; Referee: B. M. Griffiths

20 February 1952 32	Reading	5–1	Port Vale	Reading, Berkshire
		Report	Palk	Stadium: Elm Park; Attendance: 10,174

23 February 1952 33	Newport County	1–1	Port Vale	Newport, Wales
	Moore	Report	Griffiths	Stadium: Somerton Park; Attendance: 11,543

1 March 1952 34	Norwich City	2–3	Port Vale	Norwich
		Report	Steele; Hulligan; Mullard (pen.)	Stadium: Carrow Road; Attendance: 17,642

8 March 1952 35	Port Vale	3–0	Exeter City	Burslem
	Steele; Griffiths; Hulligan	Report		Stadium: Vale Park; Attendance: 12,021; Referee: G.W. Thorpe

15 March 1952 36	Colchester United	0–0	Port Vale	Colchester
		Report		Stadium: Layer Road; Attendance: 7,551

22 March 1952 37	Port Vale	2–0	Crystal Palace	Burslem
	Bennett; Griffiths	Report		Stadium: Vale Park; Attendance: 11,686

24 March 1952 38	Port Vale	4–2	Newport County	Burslem
	Steele; Griffiths; Mullard	Report	Shergold (og.)	Stadium: Vale Park; Attendance: 5,908

5 April 1952 39	Port Vale	3–0	Leyton Orient	Burslem
	Steele; Hulligan; Mullard	Report		Stadium: Vale Park; Attendance: 7,257

11 April 1952 40	Millwall	1–1	Port Vale	New Cross, Lewisham
		Report	Griffiths	Stadium: The Den; Attendance: 24,375

12 April 1952 41	Walsall	3–0	Port Vale	New Cross, Walsall
		Report		Stadium: Fellows Park; Attendance: 7,518

19 April 1952 42	Port Vale	1–0	Shrewsbury Town	Burslem
	Steele	Report		Stadium: Vale Park; Attendance: 14,469

21 April 1952 43	Port Vale	1–0	Walsall	Burslem
	Griffiths	Report		Stadium: Vale Park; Attendance: 8,401

26 April 1952 44	Aldershot	4–1	Port Vale	Aldershot
		Report	Bennett	Stadium: Recreation Ground; Attendance: 6,676

28 April 1952 45	Swindon Town	2–0	Port Vale	Swindon
	Owen; Bain	Report		Stadium: County Ground; Attendance: 4,835; Referee: A. Bond

3 May 1952 46	Port Vale	2–1	Millwall	Burslem
	Leake; Griffiths	Report		Stadium: Vale Park; Attendance: 7,316

=== FA Cup ===
24 November 1951 R1	Colchester United	3–1	Port Vale	Colchester
	Keeble 11'; Scott 24'; Elder 37' (pen.)	Report	Pinchbeck	Stadium: Layer Road; Attendance: 10,119

== Squad statistics ==
=== Appearances and goals ===
Key to positions: GK – Goalkeeper; FB – Full back; HB – Half back; FW – Forward

No.	Pos	Nat	Player	Total		Third Division South		FA Cup	
No.	Pos	Nat	Player	Apps	Goals	Apps	Goals	Apps	Goals
	GK	(England) ENG	George Heppell	28	0	27	0	1	0
	GK	(England) ENG	Ray King	19	0	19	0	0	0
	FB	(England) ENG	Lol Hamlett	25	0	24	0	1	0
	FB	(England) ENG	Reg Potts	21	0	21	0	0	0
	FB	(England) ENG	Stan Turner	40	0	40	0	0	0
	HB	(England) ENG	Tommy Cheadle	40	0	39	0	1	0
	HB	(England) ENG	Norman Hallam	3	0	3	0	0	0
	HB	(England) ENG	Basil Hayward	28	0	27	0	1	0
	HB	(England) ENG	Albert Leake	8	2	8	2	0	0
	HB	(England) ENG	Albert Mullard	35	13	34	13	1	0
	HB	(Wales) WAL	Ivor Powell	6	0	6	0	0	0
	HB	(England) ENG	Roy Sproson	28	1	28	1	0	0
	HB	(Northern Ireland) NIR	Jimmy Todd	25	0	24	0	1	0
	FW	(England) ENG	Colin Askey	7	0	7	0	0	0
	FW	(England) ENG	Len Barber	18	2	18	2	0	0
	FW	(England) ENG	Alan Bennett	40	3	39	3	1	0
	FW	(England) ENG	John Cunliffe	11	2	11	2	0	0
	FW	(England) ENG	Ken Griffiths	21	8	20	8	1	0
	FW	(England) ENG	Mick Hulligan	38	4	37	4	1	0
	FW	(England) ENG	Stan Palk	31	1	30	1	1	0
	FW	(England) ENG	Freddie Steele	14	7	14	7	0	0
Players who featured but departed the club during the season:
	FB	(England) ENG	Garth Butler	0	0	0	0	0	0
	HB	(England) ENG	Alan Martin	5	2	5	2	0	0
	HB	(Wales) WAL	Ivor Powell	6	0	6	0	0	0
	FW	(England) ENG	Walter Aveyard	13	0	13	0	0	0
	FW	(England) ENG	Cliff Pinchbeck	13	5	12	4	1	1

=== Top scorers ===
Place	Position	Nation	Name	Third Division South	FA Cup	Total
1	HB	England	Albert Mullard	13	0	13
2	FW	England	Ken Griffiths	8	0	8
3	FW	England	Freddie Steele	7	0	7
4	FW	England	Mick Hulligan	4	0	5
–	FW	England	Cliff Pinchbeck	4	1	5
6	FW	England	Alan Bennett	3	0	3
7	HB	England	Albert Leake	2	0	2
–	FW	England	John Cunliffe	2	0	2
–	HB	England	Alan Martin	2	0	2
–	FW	England	Len Barber	2	0	2
11	FW	England	Stan Palk	1	0	1
–	HB	England	Roy Sproson	1	0	1
–	–	–	Own goals	1	0	1
			TOTALS	50	1	51

== Transfers ==
=== Transfers in ===
Date from	Position	Nationality	Name	From	Fee	Ref.
July 1951	HB	WAL	Ivor Powell	Aston Villa	Free transfer	
September 1951	HB	ENG	Albert Mullard	Stoke City	Exchange	
December 1951	FW	ENG	Freddie Steele	Mansfield Town	'four-figure fee'	

=== Transfers out ===
Date from	Position	Nationality	Name	To	Fee	Ref.
September 1951	HB	ENG	Alan Martin	Stoke City	Exchange + £10,000	
October 1951	FB	ENG	Garth Butler	Retired		
November 1951	FW	ENG	Cliff Pinchbeck	Northampton Town	Undisclosed	
November 1951	HB	WAL	Ivor Powell	(Wales) Barry Town	Released	
March 1952	FW	ENG	Walter Aveyard	Accrington Stanley	'four figure fee'	
May 1952	FB	ENG	Lol Hamlett	Congleton Town	Released	
May 1952	GK	ENG	George Heppell	Witton Albion	Free transfer	
Summer 1952	FW	ENG	Stan Palk		Released	
