= Lewis White =

Lewis White may refer to:

- Lewis White (footballer) (1927–1982), English footballer
- Lewis White (swimmer) (born 2000), Paralympic British swimmer
- Lewis White (tennis) (1904–1981), American tennis player
