= Roland Lewis =

English footballer

Personal information
- Full name: Roland Lewis
- Date of birth: 21 September 1923
- Place of birth: Sandbach, England
- Date of death: September 1999 (age 74)
- Place of death: South Cheshire, England
- Position: Forward

Youth career
- Congleton Town

Senior career*
Years	Team	Apps	(Gls)
1951–1953	Port Vale	7	(0)
Total		7	(0)
- * Club domestic league appearances and goals

Roland Lewis (21 September 1925 – September 1999) was an English footballer who played as a forward for Port Vale in the Football League between 1951 and 1953.

== Career ==
Lewis played for Congleton Town before joining Port Vale in March 1950. He made his Third Division South debut for Gordon Hodgson's "Valiants" in a 2–0 defeat to Norwich City at Carrow Road on 19 August 1950. After starting the next two games, he lost his position to Cliff Pinchbeck, who had failed to turn up at the start of the season. He played three further games throughout the season. Still, he had to wait until September 1953 for his seventh and final appearance. He was released from his contract at Vale Park by manager Freddie Steele in December 1953. The club went on to win the Third Division North title and reach the FA Cup semi-finals in 1953–54.

== Career statistics ==
Appearances and goals by club, season and competition
Club	Season	League			FA Cup		Total	
Club	Season	Division	Apps	Goals	Apps	Goals	Apps	Goals
Port Vale	1950–51	Third Division South	6	0	0	0	6	0
Port Vale	1953–54	Third Division North	1	0	0	0	1	0
Port Vale	Total		7	0	0	0	7	0
