= Garth Butler =

English footballer

Personal information
- Full name: Walter Garth Butler
- Date of birth: 7 February 1923
- Place of birth: Birmingham, England
- Date of death: 13 July 1995 (aged 72)
- Place of death: Ilfracombe, England
- Position: Full-back

Youth career
- Derby County

Senior career*
Years	Team	Apps	(Gls)
1946–1951	Port Vale	128	(0)
Total		128	(0)
- * Club domestic league appearances and goals

Walter Garth Butler (7 February 1923 – 13 July 1995) was an English footballer. He was nicknamed "the assassin" for his habit of taking several different coloured pills before a match.

== Career ==
Butler joined Port Vale from Derby County in June 1946. He played 12 Third Division South games in the 1946–47 season and featured in 39 league and one FA Cup game in the 1947–48 campaign. He continued to be a key part of manager Gordon Hodgson's first-team plans. He played 34 games in the 1948–49 season and made 43 appearances in the 1949–50 campaign. He featured just five times for the "Valiants" in the 1950–51 season. He was forced to retire from professional football in October 1951 after proving unable to recover from a knee injury. He had played 134 league and cup games during his five years at the Old Recreation Ground / Vale Park.

== Career statistics ==
Appearances and goals by club, season and competition
Club	Season	League			FA Cup		Total	
Club	Season	Division	Apps	Goals	Apps	Goals	Apps	Goals
Port Vale	1946–47	Third Division South	12	0	0	0	12	0
Port Vale	1947–48	Third Division South	39	0	1	0	40	0
Port Vale	1948–49	Third Division South	33	0	1	0	34	0
Port Vale	1949–50	Third Division South	39	0	4	0	43	0
Port Vale	1950–51	Third Division South	5	0	0	0	5	0
Port Vale	1951–52	Third Division South	0	0	0	0	0	0
Total			128	0	6	0	134	0
