= George Heppell =

English footballer (1916–1993)

Personal information
- Full name: George Heppell
- Date of birth: 2 September 1916
- Place of birth: Wingate, County Durham, England
- Date of death: 20 July 1993 (aged 76)
- Place of death: Hartshill, Stoke-on-Trent, England
- Height: 5 ft 11 in (1.80 m)
- Position: Goalkeeper

Youth career
- Wolverhampton Wanderers

Senior career*
Years	Team	Apps	(Gls)
1937–1952	Port Vale	193	(0)
1952–1953	Witton Albion		
- * Club domestic league appearances and goals

George Heppell (2 September 1916 – 20 July 1993) was an English football goalkeeper who made 203 league and cup appearances for Port Vale either side of World War II. His father-in-law, Albert Pearson, and great-grandson, Tom Conlon, both also played for Port Vale.

== Career ==
Heppell joined Port Vale from Wolverhampton Wanderers in May 1937. He made 25 Third Division North appearances in the 1937–38 season, as goalkeeping duties were split between himself and James Nicholls. However, he played just three Third Division South games in the 1938–39 season, as new signing Arthur Jepson became the club's first choice goalkeeper. Heppell was enlisted into the Army in February 1940. Despite this he managed to guest for Nottingham Forest and Middlesbrough during World War II, before returning to Port Vale following his demobilization in January 1946. He was an ever-present during the 1946–47 season, as his form convinced the club to sell Jepson to rivals Stoke City. He remained Gordon Hodgson's first choice goalkeeper, playing 40 games in the 1947–48 campaign. He played 38 games in the 1948–49 season, ahead of reserves Ray Hancock and Harry Prince. However, he then lost his place, and played just three games in the 1949–50 season as new signing Ray King proved to be in impressive form. He featured 17 and 28 times in the 1950–51 and 1951–52 seasons, before being handed a free transfer away from Vale Park by new boss Freddie Steele in May 1952. He later played Cheshire County League football for Witton Albion, featuring in 18 games during the 1952–53 season.

== Personal life ==
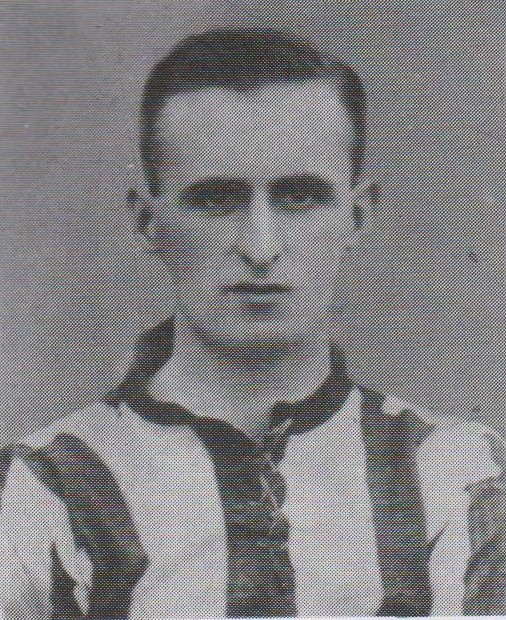
father-in-law Albert Pearson.

His father-in-law was Albert Pearson, who played for Port Vale and Liverpool from 1914 to 1922. Heppell's great-grandson, Tom Conlon signed with Port Vale in 2018.

== Career statistics ==
Appearances and goals by club, season and competition
Club	Season	League			FA Cup		Other		Total	
Club	Season	Division	Apps	Goals	Apps	Goals	Apps	Goals	Apps	Goals
Port Vale	1937–38	Third Division North	25	0	1	0	1	0	27	0
Port Vale	1938–39	Third Division South	3	0	0	0	0	0	3	0
Port Vale	1946–47	Third Division South	42	0	5	0	—		47	0
Port Vale	1947–48	Third Division South	39	0	1	0	—		40	0
Port Vale	1948–49	Third Division South	37	0	1	0	—		38	0
Port Vale	1949–50	Third Division South	3	0	0	0	—		3	0
Port Vale	1950–51	Third Division South	17	0	0	0	—		17	0
Port Vale	1951–52	Third Division South	27	0	1	0	—		28	0
Port Vale	Total		193	0	9	0	1	0	203	0
Witton Albion	1952–53	Cheshire County League							18	0
