= George O'Neill =

George O'Neill may refer to:

- George O'Neill (footballer, born 1942), Scottish footballer who was capped for the United States
- George O'Neill (footballer, born 1923) (1923–2003), English footballer for Port Vale
- George Bernard O'Neill (1828–1917), Irish genre painter

== See also ==
- George O'Neil (1896–1940), American poet, playwright, novelist and film writer
