= Lol Hamlett =

English footballer (1917-1986)

Personal information
- Full name: Thomas Lawrence Hamlett
- Date of birth: 24 January 1917
- Place of birth: Stoke-on-Trent, England
- Date of death: 22 May 1986 (aged 69)
- Place of death: Milton, Stoke-on-Trent, England
- Position: Right back

Youth career
- Cornhill White Star
- Chell Heath

Senior career*
Years	Team	Apps	(Gls)
1937–1938	Congleton Town	42	(0)
1938–1949	Bolton Wanderers	72	(9)
1949–1952	Port Vale	109	(0)
1952–1954	Congleton Town	66	(0)
Total		289	(9)

Managerial career
- Congleton Town
- * Club domestic league appearances and goals

Thomas Lawrence Hamlett (24 January 1917 – 22 May 1986) was an English footballer who played at right-back for Congleton Town, Bolton Wanderers, and Port Vale. He scored nine goals in 181 league appearances in the six seasons of the Football League immediately following World War II. He later spent 25 years on the coaching staff at Port Vale, from July 1958 to March 1983.

== Playing career ==
Hamlett became an apprentice joiner. He played football for Cornhill White Star and Chell Heath, as well as representing the North Staffordshire Schoolboys team. He had trials at Blackpool and Stoke City. He was signed to Congleton Town, before joining Bolton Wanderers for a Cheshire County League record transfer fee of £750. World War II devastated his career, limiting him to guest appearances for Stoke City and Manchester United. Playing for Stoke, he scored two goals in 35 games in 1941–42, one goal in 34 games in 1942–43, and then played ten games in the 1943–44 season. A brief 19 game spell in the Cheshire League with Mossley followed in the first post-war season of 1945–46 before he returned to Bolton. That season he was also called up to the England team as a reserve for the games against Switzerland and France.

He returned to the Victoria Ground with Bolton on 19 March 1949 and scored an own goal in a 4–0 win for the "Potters". Walter Rowley's "Trotters" meanwhile finished 18th in the First Division in 1946–47, and then 17th in 1947–48 and 14th in 1948–49. In his three years at Burnden Park, he scored nine goals in 72 league and 13 FA Cup appearances. He was present at the Burnden Park disaster on 9 March 1946, where 33 spectators were killed.

He signed with Gordon Hodgson's Port Vale in May 1949. He went straight into the "Valiants" first-team, making 40 Third Division South and four FA Cup appearances in the 1949–50 season. He then played 45 league and four FA Cup games in the 1950–51 campaign, as the club moved grounds from the Old Recreation Ground to Vale Park. He lost his first-team place after an injury in November 1951 and was released by new boss Freddie Steele in May 1952 after 25 league and cup games in the 1951–52 season. He returned to Congleton as player-manager, before retiring as a footballer.

== Coaching career ==
Hamlett returned to Port Vale as the trainer-coach in July 1958. He gave up his coaching responsibilities in May 1960, remaining as a trainer until March 1983 when he retired due to illness. A religious man, he refused to use bad language, and thus used to motivate his players with words of encouragement. Instead of swearing he used say "fizzing" a lot, as in "the opposition are a fizzing tough bunch". He served the club under 10 different managers: Norman Low, Freddie Steele, Jackie Mudie, Stanley Matthews, Gordon Lee, Roy Sproson, Bobby Smith, Dennis Butler, Alan Bloor, and John McGrath. He was given a testimonial match on 8 November 1976, Port Vale playing a Don Revie XI.

== Personal life ==
In addition to his career in football, Hamlett also served as a lay preacher in the Methodist church. He married Audrey, who was from Bolton and had two sons: Gordon and David.

== Career statistics ==
Appearances and goals by club, season and competition
Club	Season	League			FA Cup		Total	
Club	Season	Division	Apps	Goals	Apps	Goals	Apps	Goals
Bolton Wanderers	1945–46		0	0	9	0	9	0
Bolton Wanderers	1946–47	First Division	42	8	3	0	45	8
Bolton Wanderers	1947–48	First Division	21	1	0	0	21	1
Bolton Wanderers	1948–49	First Division	9	0	1	0	10	0
Bolton Wanderers	Total		72	9	13	0	85	9
Port Vale	1949–50	Third Division South	40	0	4	0	44	0
Port Vale	1950–51	Third Division South	45	0	4	0	49	0
Port Vale	1951–52	Third Division South	24	0	1	0	25	0
Port Vale	Total		109	0	9	0	118	0
Career total			181	9	22	0	203	9
