= Alan Bennett (footballer, born 1931) =

English footballer (1931–2006)

Personal information
- Full name: Alan Bennett
- Date of birth: 5 November 1931
- Place of birth: Hanley, Stoke-on-Trent, England
- Date of death: 17 January 2006 (aged 74)
- Place of death: Stoke-on-Trent, England
- Position: Left winger

Youth career
- Grove Youth Club
- Port Vale

Senior career*
Years	Team	Apps	(Gls)
1949–1957	Port Vale	123	(8)
1957–1958	Crewe Alexandra	10	(0)
Total		133	(8)

International career
- England Youth
- * Club domestic league appearances and goals

Alan Bennett (5 November 1931 – 17 January 2006) was an English footballer who played on the left-wing. He made 133 league appearances in a nine-year career in the English Football League. He played for Port Vale between 1949 and 1957, and was a member of the Third Division North winning side in 1953–54. He retired in 1958, following one season with Crewe Alexandra.

== Career ==
=== Port Vale ===
Bennett graduated from the Port Vale juniors to sign his first professional contract with the club in 1949. He represented England Youth. He made his senior debut for Port Vale on 26 March 1949, in a 2–0 defeat to Bournemouth & Boscombe Athletic at the Old Recreation Ground. He played ten Third Division South games for Gordon Hodgson's "Valiants" in 1949–50. He featured 31 times in 1950–51, and scored his first senior goal on 30 September, in a 2–1 home win over Swindon Town. Bennett scored three goals in 40 appearances in 1951–52, after retaining his first-team place at Vale Park despite the transition of manager from Hodgson to Ivor Powell and then to Freddie Steele. He scored three goals in 29 games in 1952–53, as Vale went on to finish second in the Third Division North. He lost his first-team place in December 1952, and featured only five times in 1953–54, as Vale won the league title and reached the semi-finals of the FA Cup. He played four Second Division games in 1954–55, and then featured seven times in 1955–56 and just twice in 1956–57. Having failed to revive his career under new manager Norman Low, Bennett was transferred to Maurice Lindley's Crewe Alexandra in September 1957.

=== Crewe Alexandra ===
The "Railwaymen" finished bottom of the English Football League in 1957–58, and Bennett then announced his retirement at the age of 27.

== Style of play ==
A skilful and speedy winger, he required the protection of his teammates to prevent opposition hatchet men from taking him out of the game.

== Later life ==
After leaving the game, Bennett took up the greengrocer trade, later becoming a coal merchant.

== Career statistics ==
Appearances and goals by club, season and competition
Club	Season	League			FA Cup		Total	
Club	Season	Division	Apps	Goals	Apps	Goals	Apps	Goals
Port Vale	1948–49	Third Division South	1	0	0	0	1	0
Port Vale	1949–50	Third Division South	10	0	0	0	10	0
Port Vale	1950–51	Third Division South	28	2	3	1	31	3
Port Vale	1951–52	Third Division South	39	3	1	0	40	3
Port Vale	1952–53	Third Division North	27	3	2	0	29	3
Port Vale	1953–54	Third Division North	5	0	0	0	5	0
Port Vale	1954–55	Second Division	4	0	0	0	4	0
Port Vale	1955–56	Second Division	7	0	0	0	7	0
Port Vale	1956–57	Second Division	2	0	0	0	2	0
Port Vale	1957–58	Third Division South	0	0	0	0	0	0
Port Vale	Total		123	8	6	1	129	9
Crewe Alexandra	1957–58	Third Division North	10	0	0	0	10	0
Career total			133	8	6	1	139	9

== Honours ==
Port Vale

- Football League Third Division North: 1953–54
