= Pat Raftery (footballer) =

English footballer

Personal information
- Full name: Patrick Thomas Raftery
- Date of birth: 28 November 1925
- Place of birth: Burslem, Stoke-on-Trent, England
- Date of death: 29 September 1998 (aged 72)
- Position: Forward

Youth career
- Stanfields
- Norton Miners
- Harriseahead
- Ravensdale

Senior career*
Years	Team	Apps	(Gls)
	Hull City	0	(0)
- Ravensdale
1948–1950	Port Vale	5	(0)
- Wellington Town
- Stafford Rangers
- Leek Town
- Gresley Rovers
- Audley
- * Club domestic league appearances and goals

Patrick Thomas Raftery (28 November 1925 – 29 September 1998) was an English footballer who played as a forward. He played for Port Vale in the English Football League, as well as a host of non-League clubs.

== Career ==
Raftery played for Stanfields, Norton Miners, Harriseahead, Ravensdale (in two spells) and Hull City before joining his hometown club Port Vale as an amateur in November 1948. After making his debut under manager Gordon Hodgson in a 3–0 home win over Leyton Orient on Christmas day of 1948, he signed as a professional the next month. He played two Third Division South games in 1948–49, and then played three league games in 1949–50 before being transferred to Wellington Town in February 1950. He later played for Stafford Rangers, Leek Town, Gresley Rovers and Audley.

== Career statistics ==
Appearances and goals by club, season and competition
Club	Season	League			FA Cup		Total	
Club	Season	Division	Apps	Goals	Apps	Goals	Apps	Goals
Port Vale	1948–49	Third Division South	2	0	0	0	2	0
Port Vale	1949–50	Third Division South	3	0	0	0	3	0
Port Vale	Total		5	0	0	0	5	0
