= Walter Aveyard =

English footballer

Personal information
- Full name: Walter Aveyard
- Date of birth: 11 June 1918
- Place of birth: Hemsworth, England
- Date of death: 16 July 1985 (aged 67)
- Place of death: Blackpool, England
- Height: 5 ft 11 in (1.80 m)
- Position: Centre-forward

Youth career
- Denaby United

Senior career*
Years	Team	Apps	(Gls)
1938–1947	Sheffield Wednesday	4	(3)
1947–1948	Birmingham City	7	(3)
1948–1952	Port Vale	103	(26)
1952–1953	Accrington Stanley	24	(4)
Total		138	(36)
- * Club domestic league appearances and goals

Walter Aveyard (11 June 1918 – 16 July 1985) was an English footballer who made more than 100 appearances in the Football League, playing for Sheffield Wednesday, Birmingham City, Port Vale and Accrington Stanley.

== Career ==
Aveyard was born in Hemsworth, Yorkshire. He played football for Denaby United before turning professional with Sheffield Wednesday in 1938, but the Second World War interrupted his career before he played for the first-team. When competitive football resumed after the war, Aveyard made his first-team debut in the 1945–46 FA Cup, scoring twice in six games, but played only four league games in the 1946–47 season, in which he scored three goals, before leaving for Birmingham City in April 1947. He made a promising start, scoring the only goal of his debut match against Coventry City in August 1947 and two more goals, including another winner, in his next three games, but a thigh injury meant he missed most of the season, and he was allowed to join Port Vale in June 1948.

He scored on his debut in a 1–1 draw at Millwall on 21 August 1948. He quickly established himself in the first-team and became the club's top scorer for the 1948–49 season with 13 goals. He has the honour of being the first player to score at Vale Park in a 1–0 win over Newport County on 24 August 1950. However, he lost his place in the side by September 1951 and was sold to Accrington Stanley for a four-figure fee in March 1952.

Aveyard scored on debut yet again, but his form deserted him. At the end of his first complete season, Stanley finished bottom of the Third Division North and put him on the transfer list, priced at £1000, but there were no offers. He retired from professional football in the summer of 1953.

Aveyard died in Blackpool, Lancashire, in 1985.

== Career statistics ==
Appearances and goals by club, season and competition
Club	Season	League			FA Cup		Total	
Club	Season	Division	Apps	Goals	Apps	Goals	Apps	Goals
Sheffield Wednesday	1945–46		0	0	6	2	6	2
Sheffield Wednesday	1946–47	Second Division	4	3	0	0	4	3
Sheffield Wednesday	Total		4	3	6	2	10	5
Birmingham City	1947–48	Second Division	7	3	0	0	7	3
Port Vale	1948–49	Third Division South	34	13	1	0	35	13
Port Vale	1949–50	Third Division South	23	6	0	0	23	6
Port Vale	1950–51	Third Division South	33	7	4	3	37	10
Port Vale	1951–52	Third Division South	13	0	0	0	13	0
Port Vale	Total		103	26	5	3	108	29
Accrington Stanley	1951–52	Third Division North	11	2	0	0	11	2
Accrington Stanley	1952–53	Third Division North	13	2	0	0	13	2
Accrington Stanley	Total		24	4	0	0	24	4
Career total			138	36	11	5	149	41
