= Cliff Pinchbeck =

English footballer

Personal information
- Full name: Clifford Brian Pinchbeck
- Date of birth: 20 January 1925
- Place of birth: Cleethorpes, England
- Date of death: 2 November 1996 (aged 71)
- Height: 6 ft 0 in (1.83 m)
- Position: Forward

Youth career
- Scunthorpe United

Senior career*
Years	Team	Apps	(Gls)
1947–1948	Everton	3	(0)
1948–1949	Brighton & Hove Albion	14	(5)
1949–1951	Port Vale	69	(34)
1951–1952	Northampton Town	3	(3)
1953–1955	Bath City	60	(27)
1955-	Salisbury		(5)
Total		149+	(69)
- * Club domestic league appearances and goals

Clifford Brian Pinchbeck (20 January 1925 – 2 November 1996) was an English footballer who played as a forward. He spent six years in the Football League, between 1947 and 1953, with Everton, Brighton & Hove Albion, Port Vale, and Northampton Town. He later played non-League football for Bath City and Salisbury.

== Career ==
Pinchbeck began his career at Scunthorpe United, before moving on to Everton. He played three First Division games for Theo Kelly's "Toffees" in 1947–48, before leaving Goodison Park for Don Welsh's Brighton & Hove Albion. He helped the "Seagulls" to finish sixth in the Third Division South in 1948–49. He left the Goldstone Ground and joined league rivals Port Vale for a £3,500 fee in November 1949.

He made a perfect start for his new club, scoring a hat-trick in a 4–0 win over Millwall at the Old Recreation Ground on 12 November. He went on to finish the 1949–50 campaign as the club's top-scorer with 16 goals in 31 appearances – twice as many goals as his nearest rivals. He hit 19 goals in 34 games in 1950–51, including one against rivals Stoke City at the Victoria Ground, to become the club's top-scorer for a second successive season. However, he was transfer-listed and dropped from the side by manager Gordon Hodgson in March 1951, and failed to turn up at the start of the 1951–52 season, claiming illness. He regained his first-team place in September 1951 under new boss Ivor Powell, and hit five goals in 13 games in 1951–52. He finally got his wish, and secured a move away from Vale Park in November 1951, when he was sold to league rivals Northampton Town for 'an undisclosed sum'.

Pinchbeck scored three goals in three league games for Bob Dennison's "Cobblers" in 1951–52. He left the County Ground. He signed for Eddie Hapgood's Southern League side Bath City in August 1953, scoring 23 goals within his first year at Twerton Park. He moved on to Western League side Salisbury in January 1955.

== Career statistics ==
Appearances and goals by club, season and competition
Club	Season	League			FA Cup		Total	
Club	Season	Division	Apps	Goals	Apps	Goals	Apps	Goals
Everton	1947–48	First Division	3	0	0	0	3	0
Brighton & Hove Albion	1949–50	Third Division South	14	5	0	0	14	5
Port Vale	1949–50	Third Division South	27	14	4	2	31	16
Port Vale	1950–51	Third Division South	30	16	4	3	34	19
Port Vale	1951–52	Third Division South	12	4	1	1	13	5
Port Vale	Total		69	34	9	6	78	40
Northampton Town	1951–52	Third Division South	3	3	0	0	3	3
Career total			89	42	9	6	98	48
