= Stan Palk =

English footballer and manager (1921–2009)

Personal information
- Full name: Stanley Palk
- Date of birth: 28 October 1921
- Place of birth: Liverpool, England
- Date of death: 12 October 2009 (aged 87)
- Place of death: Liverpool, England
- Position: Inside forward

Youth career
- South Liverpool

Senior career*
Years	Team	Apps	(Gls)
1940–1948	Liverpool	13	(0)
1948–1952	Port Vale	159	(14)
- Worcester City
- Flint Town
- Oswestry Town
- Maghull
Total		172+	(14+)

Managerial career
- Maghull
- * Club domestic league appearances and goals

Stanley Palk (28 October 1921 – 12 October 2009) was an English footballer. An inside-forward, he moved from South Liverpool to Liverpool in 1940. He remained at the club throughout World War II whilst also serving with the Royal Navy in Mombasa. He played 13 league games for the club after the war, and was a squad member for the First Division title-winning season of 1946–47 before joining Port Vale as part-exchange for a £10,000 transfer fee in July 1948. He made 169 appearances in all competitions for the "Valiants" before heading into non-League football with Worcester City, Flint Town, Oswestry Town, and Maghull.

== Career ==
Palk started his career with South Liverpool when, in 1940, he was invited to train with Liverpool by manager George Kay. He scored 14 goals in 61 games throughout World War II, including one in the Merseyside derby match of April 1944, in the Liverpool Senior Cup. He spent 1944 to 1946 in Mombasa, serving in the Royal Navy. On his return to Anfield he made 13 competitive appearances, featuring in the First Division title-winning season of 1946–47, and the disappointing 1947–48 campaign. He signed for a then club record transfer fee of £10,000 in July 1948.

"I'd just come back from the States and I got the shock of my life. Tom Bush, a former centre half who was then working on the office staff, knocked on my door and said I wanted down at the ground. I turned up and standing there was Gordon Hodgson, the legendary Liverpool centre forward who managed Port Vale. He wanted to sign Mick Hulligan and myself in a double deal. I was unsure what to do at first because I really wanted to stay with Liverpool but the opportunity of first team football was too tempting and I eventually decided to go."

— Palk in a liverpoolfc.tv interview in February 2005.

Palk scored four goals in 42 Third Division South games in the 1948–49 campaign, scoring his first senior goal against Reading in a 2–1 win at Elm Park on 1 September. He then scored three goals in 46 appearances in 1949–50, in the last ever season of football at the Old Recreation Ground. During a 2–1 defeat at Bristol Rovers on 17 December 1949, he caused a minor dispute as his successfully converted penalty kick passed through the net.

He hit six goals in 49 appearances in the 1950–51 season, missing just one league game. This was the first season of football at the newly opened Vale Park. Following the death of manager Gordon Hodgson, Ivor Powell was appointed as manager, before he was replaced by Freddie Steele in December 1951. Palk played 31 games in 1951–52, scoring one goal, before the club released him. He had made 169 appearances (159 in the Football League and 10 in the FA Cup) for the "Valiants", scoring 14 league goals. He later played for Worcester City, Flint Town and Oswestry Town.

== Personal life ==
Palk had a son, Gary, and two daughters, Alex and Nicola. He also had four grandchildren (Rob, Rachel, Caroline and Natalie) and one great-grandchild (Oliver) before his death at Royal Liverpool University Hospital on 12 October 2009.

== Palk or Polk? ==
Palk has often been recorded as Polk.

"It's all down to a mix-up with the birth certificate when I first signed for the Reds. For some reason I had two birth certificates, one with Palk and one with Polk. On the day I signed I had to produce it and must have shown them the wrong one. The name Palk is Cornish and is actually pronounced with an 'O', so I can understand how the confusion has come about. It's never bothered me though."

— Palk explains the confusion over his surname.

== Career statistics ==
Appearances and goals by club, season and competition
Club	Season	League			FA Cup		Wartime		Total	
Club	Season	Division	Apps	Goals	Apps	Goals	Apps	Goals	Apps	Goals
Liverpool	1940–46	–	0	0	0	0	62	14	62	14
Liverpool	1946–47	First Division	6	0	0	0	—		6	0
Liverpool	1947–48	First Division	7	0	0	0	—		7	0
Liverpool	Total		13	0	0	0	62	14	75	14
Port Vale	1948–49	Third Division South	42	4	1	0	—		43	4
Port Vale	1949–50	Third Division South	42	3	4	0	—		46	3
Port Vale	1950–51	Third Division South	45	6	4	0	—		49	6
Port Vale	1951–52	Third Division South	30	1	1	0	—		31	1
Port Vale	Total		159	14	10	0	0	0	169	14
Career total			172	14	10	0	62	14	244	28

== Honours ==
Liverpool

- Football League First Division: 1946–47
