= Bernard Jones (footballer, born 1924) =

English footballer (1924–2000)

Personal information
- Full name: Bernard Jones
- Date of birth: 27 September 1924
- Place of birth: Stoke-on-Trent, England
- Date of death: 2000 (aged 75–76)
- Position: Winger

Youth career
- Crewe Alexandra
- Longport

Senior career*
Years	Team	Apps	(Gls)
1948	Port Vale	6	(0)
1948–1949	Macclesfield Town	4	(1)
1949–1951	Winsford United		
1951–1952	Macclesfield Town	44	(8)
- Stafford Rangers
Total		54+	(9+)
- * Club domestic league appearances and goals

Bernard Jones (27 September 1924 – 2000) was an English footballer who played in the Football League for Port Vale. He later turned out for non-League sides Winsford United, Macclesfield Town and Stafford Rangers.

== Career ==
Jones played for Crewe Alexandra and Longport before joining Gordon Hodgson's Port Vale in October 1948. He played six Third Division South and one FA Cup game in the 1948–49 season. Failing to earn a first-team spot at the Old Recreation Ground, he was transferred to Winsford United in November 1949, and later played for Macclesfield Town and Stafford Rangers. He was a member of the Macclesfield Town team which won the Cheshire Senior Cup in 1951 and 1952.

== Career statistics ==
Appearances and goals by club, season and competition
Club	Season	League			FA Cup		Other		Total	
Club	Season	Division	Apps	Goals	Apps	Goals	Apps	Goals	Apps	Goals
Port Vale	1948–49	Third Division South	6	0	1	0	—		7	0
Port Vale	1949–50	Third Division South	0	0	0	0	—		0	0
Port Vale	Total		6	0	1	0	0	0	7	0
Macclesfield Town	1948–49	Cheshire County League	4	1	0	0	0	0	4	1
Macclesfield Town	1950–51	Cheshire County League	15	4	0	0	5	2	20	6
Macclesfield Town	1951–52	Cheshire County League	29	4	0	0	7	2	36	6
Macclesfield Town	Total		44	8	0	0	12	4	56	12

== Honours ==
Macclesfield Town

- Cheshire Senior Cup: 1951 & 1952
