= John Abbotts =

English footballer

Personal information
- Full name: John Abbotts
- Date of birth: 10 October 1924
- Place of birth: Goldenhill, Stoke-on-Trent, England
- Date of death: 10 February 2008 (aged 83)
- Place of death: Stoke-on-Trent, England
- Position: Defender

Youth career
- Meakin's
- Ravenscliffe

Senior career*
| Years | Team | Apps | (Gls) |
| 1949–1953 | Port Vale | 3 | (0) |
| Total | | 3 | (0) |
- * Club domestic league appearances and goals

John Abbotts (10 October 1924 – 10 February 2008) was an English footballer.

== Career ==
Abbotts played for Meakin's and Ravenscliffe before joining Port Vale in May 1949. He made his debut at right-back in a 2–1 defeat at Newport County on 31 August 1950 and played two further games later in the season, but was not selected again and was released in May 1953.

== Career statistics ==
Appearances and goals by club, season and competition
| Club | Season | League | | | FA Cup | | Total | |
| Club | Season | Division | Apps | Goals | Apps | Goals | Apps | Goals |
|---|---|---|---|---|---|---|---|---|
| Port Vale | 1950–51 | Third Division South | 3 | 0 | 0 | 0 | 3 | 0 |
