= Albert Mullard =

English footballer

Personal information
- Full name: Albert Thomas Mullard
- Date of birth: 22 November 1920
- Place of birth: Tamworth, England
- Date of death: 27 May 1984 (aged 63)
- Place of death: Bilston, England
- Positions: Right-half; inside forward

Senior career*
Years	Team	Apps	(Gls)
	Hinckley United	?	(?)
1946–1949	Walsall	62	(13)
1949–1950	Crewe Alexandra	44	(15)
1950–1951	Stoke City	21	(3)
1951–1956	Port Vale	163	(22)
	Northwich Victoria	?	(?)
Total		290	(52)
- * Club domestic league appearances and goals

Albert Thomas Mullard (22 November 1920 – 27 May 1984) was an English footballer who played at right-half and inside forward.

After spending most of World War II in a Prisoner-of-war camp, he turned to professional football. He plied his trade in the Midlands with Walsall, Crewe Alexandra, and Stoke City. However, his most successful time was with Port Vale, with whom he won the Third Division North title and reached the FA Cup semi-finals in 1953–54. He also turned out for non-league sides Hinckley United and Northwich Victoria.

== World War II ==
Mullard worked as a labourer at a brickworks but enlisted in the Royal Marines on 24 September 1940. He was posted to North Africa and was eventually sent to Crete as part of MNDBO1 (Marine Naval Base Defence Organisation). He participated in the Battle of Crete in May 1941. He was captured by German Mountain Troops on 31 May 1941 while fighting in the rearguard action to defend the British evacuation at Sfakia.

He was moved to mainland Europe after his capture, spending time at Stalag III-D at Steglitz (suburb of Berlin) then transferred to Stalag IV-D at Torgau, before being liberated by US troops in April 1945. During his captivity in Germany, he regularly corresponded via letter with his future wife, née Mary Rickuss, who he had met briefly at a family function before his enlistment. Whilst a POW, he played football for a Royal Marine side after his mother sent him his football boots in a Red Cross parcel. On his return to the United Kingdom, he contemplated staying in the Marines but married Mary Rickuss and embarked on a career as a professional footballer.

== Career ==
=== Early career ===
Mullard, a "good all-round player", played for Hinckley United, before entering the English Football League with Harry Hibbs's Walsall in the 1946–47 season. The "Saddlers" finished fifth in the Third Division South in 1946–47, third in 1947–48, and 14th in 1948–49. In his three years at Fellows Park, he scored 13 goals in 61 league games. In June 1949 he joined Arthur Turner's Crewe Alexandra, but left Gresty Road after the "Railwaymen" posted a seventh-place finish in the Third Division North in 1949–50 season.

=== Stoke City ===
Stoke City manager Bob McGrory paid £8,000 to bring Mullard to the Victoria Ground in August 1950. He scored four goals in 16 games in 1950–51, one each against Manchester United and Aston Villa, and two against rivals Port Vale in the FA Cup. He scored once in seven First Division games in 1951–52, before he and £10,000 were traded to Third Division South side Port Vale in September 1951, in exchange for Alan Martin.

=== Port Vale ===
Mullard was the "Valiants" leading scorer in the 1951–52 campaign with 13 goals in 35 games. Though signed by Ivor Powell, he remained a consistent first-team player under new boss Freddie Steele. He scored seven goals in 43 appearances in 1952–53, as Vale finished second in the Third Division North. He was an ever-present during the 1953–54 campaign, as the club won the league title and reached the FA Cup semi-finals. He played at right-half throughout the campaign, and so only found the net once in 54 games. He scored once in 37 Second Division games in 1954–55, but only featured seven times in 1955–56 as he tore a groin muscle. He was transferred to Cheshire County League side Northwich Victoria in the summer of 1956.

== Personal life ==
Albert Mullard was born to Albert Ernest Mullard and Sarah Mullard (who outlived all three of her sons, Albert, Eric and Arthur) on 22 November 1920. His father died whilst Mullard was in his teens, which was possibly due to wounds sustained during the First World War, having been wounded three times during his service in the South Wales Borderers and then the Machine Gun Corps.

He died from advanced cancer on 27 May 1984. He was survived by his wife, Mary Mullard. They had two daughters, Mary and Janet.

== Career statistics ==
Appearances and goals by club, season and competition
Club	Season	League			FA Cup		Total	
Club	Season	Division	Apps	Goals	Apps	Goals	Apps	Goals
Walsall	1945–46	Third Division South	0	0	1	1	1	1
Walsall	1946–47	Third Division South	27	9	1	0	28	9
Walsall	1947–48	Third Division South	2	0	0	0	2	0
Walsall	1948–49	Third Division South	33	3	4	0	37	3
Walsall	Total		62	12	6	1	68	13
Crewe Alexandra	1949–50	Third Division North	42	15	5	1	47	13
Crewe Alexandra	1950–51	Third Division North	2	0	0	0	2	0
Crewe Alexandra	Total		44	15	5	1	49	16
Stoke City	1950–51	First Division	14	2	2	2	16	4
Stoke City	1951–52	First Division	7	1	0	0	7	1
Stoke City	Total		21	3	2	2	23	5
Port Vale	1951–52	Third Division South	34	13	1	0	35	13
Port Vale	1952–53	Third Division North	40	6	2	1	42	7
Port Vale	1953–54	Third Division North	46	1	8	0	54	1
Port Vale	1954–55	Second Division	37	1	3	0	40	1
Port Vale	1955–56	Second Division	6	1	1	0	7	1
Port Vale	Total		163	22	15	1	178	23
Career total			290	52	28	5	318	57

== Honours ==
Port Vale

- Football League Third Division North: 1953–54
