= Bernard Jones (footballer, born 1934) =

English footballer (1934–2020)

Personal information
- Full name: Bernard Jones
- Date of birth: 10 April 1934
- Place of birth: Coventry, England
- Date of death: 12 May 2020 (aged 86)
- Place of death: Coventry, England
- Position: Forward

Senior career*
Years	Team	Apps	(Gls)
1952–1956	Northampton Town	43	(16)
1956–1957	Cardiff City	9	(0)
1957–1959	Shrewsbury Town	43	(15)
- * Club domestic league appearances and goals

Bernard Jones (10 April 1934 – 12 May 2020) was an English professional footballer who played as a forward. During his career, he made 95 appearances in the Football League for Northampton Town, Cardiff City and Shrewsbury Town. Jones died on 12 May 2020, at the age of 86.
