= George O'Neill (footballer, born 1923) =

English footballer

Personal information
- Full name: George Patrick O'Neill
- Date of birth: 21 July 1923
- Place of birth: Liverpool, England
- Date of death: 2003 (aged 79–80)
- Position: Inside forward

Youth career
- Ellesmere Port Town

Senior career*
Years	Team	Apps	(Gls)
1948–1949	Port Vale	5	(0)
Total		5	(0)
- * Club domestic league appearances and goals

George Patrick O'Neill (21 July 1923 – 2003) was an English footballer who played five games at inside-forward for Port Vale in 1948.

== Career ==
O'Neill played as an amateur with Ellesmere Port Town before joining Third Division South club Port Vale in November 1948. He made his debut at outside-right in a 2–1 defeat to Notts County at Meadow Lane on 13 November, but broke a toe at his work the following week. He recovered by January the next year, but after failing to nail down a regular spot, was released by manager Gordon Hodgson at the end of the 1948–49 season.

== Career statistics ==
Appearances and goals by club, season and competition
Club	Season	League			FA Cup		Total	
Club	Season	Division	Apps	Goals	Apps	Goals	Apps	Goals
Port Vale	1948–49	Third Division South	5	0	0	0	5	0
Total			5	0	0	0	5	0
