= Lewis White (footballer) =

English footballer

Personal information
- Full name: Lewis White
- Date of birth: 2 August 1927
- Place of birth: Stoke-on-Trent, England
- Date of death: 1982 (aged 54–55)
- Position: Forward

Senior career*
Years	Team	Apps	(Gls)
1948–1949	Port Vale	1	(0)
- Winsford United
- * Club domestic league appearances and goals

Lewis White (2 August 1927 – 1982) was an English footballer who played as a forward in the Football League for Port Vale.

== Career ==
White signed professional forms with Port Vale in October 1948. His only appearance came at outside-right in a 2–1 defeat to Ipswich Town at the Old Recreation Ground on 23 October. He was transferred to Winsford United by manager Gordon Hodgson in July 1949.

== Career statistics ==
Appearances and goals by club, season and competition
Club	Season	League			FA Cup		Total	
Club	Season	Division	Apps	Goals	Apps	Goals	Apps	Goals
Port Vale	1948–49	Third Division South	1	0	0	0	1	0
