= Billy Shergold =

Welsh footballer

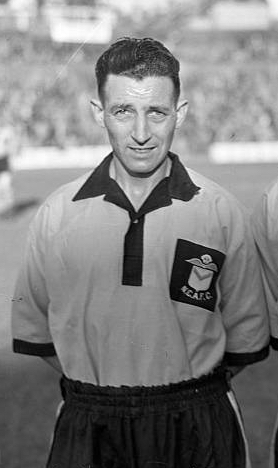

Personal information
- Full name: William Richard Shergold
- Date of birth: 22 January 1923
- Place of birth: Newport, Wales
- Date of death: 21 July 1968 (aged 45)
- Position: Inside forward

Youth career
- 1941–1947: Bishop Auckland

Senior career*
Years	Team	Apps	(Gls)
1947–1956	Newport County	273	(48)
1956–1958	Weymouth	104	(37)

International career
1947	Wales	1	
- * Club domestic league appearances and goals

William Richard Shergold (22 January 1923 – 21 July 1968) was a Welsh professional footballer, born in Slade Street, Newport, where his Grandfather moved for work from Wiltshire in 1886, a mere quarter-of-a-mile from Somerton Park, home of his future team Newport County. An inside-forward, he joined Newport County in 1947 from Bishop Auckland. He went on to make 273 Football League appearances for Newport County scoring 48 goals, at the time Newport County were playing in Division 4 (North) and 3rd Division (South). He is the 7th longest serving member of Newport County. In 1956 he joined Weymouth with 104 appearances and 37 goals in two years.

On 29 Mar 1947 Billy Shergold played for Wales against England in a friendly in Newport. England won the match 2–1.

On Monday 8 May 1967 a testimonial match took place at Newport County, for the Billy Shergold Testimonial Fund.
