= Wally Ardron =

English footballer (1918–1978)

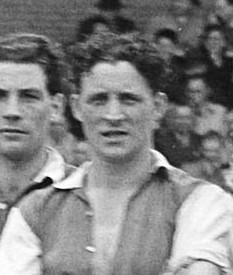
- Ardron in 1948

Personal information
- Date of birth: 19 September 1918
- Place of birth: Swinton, West Riding of Yorkshire, England
- Date of death: 1978 (aged 59–60)
- Position: Centre forward

Senior career*
Years	Team	Apps	(Gls)
- Denaby United
1938–1949	Rotherham United	123	(98)
1949–1955	Nottingham Forest	182	(123)
- * Club domestic league appearances and goals

Wally Ardron (19 September 1918 – March 1978) was an English footballer who played as a centre forward. He joined Rotherham United from Denaby United, and went on to score 98 Football League goals for Rotherham, either side of World War II.

He joined Nottingham Forest after his time at Rotherham. Ardron scored on his league debut for Nottingham Forest on 20 August 1949 in the 2–2 draw away to Brighton. He holds the record for scoring most Forest league goals in one season (36 in 1950–51) and is their third highest goal scorer in all competitions.

== Career statistics ==
Appearances and goals by club, season and competition
Club	Season	League			FA Cup		Total	
Club	Season	Division	Apps	Goals	Apps	Goals	Apps	Goals
Rotherham United	1938–39	Third Division (North)	1	0	0	0	0	0
Rotherham United	1945–46	—	—		8	3	8	3
Rotherham United	1946–47	Third Division (North)	40	38	2	2	42	40
Rotherham United	1947–48	Third Division (North)	40	30	1	0	41	30
Rotherham United	1948–49	Third Division (North)	42	30	2	2	44	32
Rotherham United	Total		123	98	13	7	136	105
Nottingham Forest	1949–50	Third Division (South)	41	25	2	0	43	25
Nottingham Forest	1950–51	Third Division (South)	45	36	2	0	47	36
Nottingham Forest	1951–52	Second Division	39	29	2	0	41	29
Nottingham Forest	1952–53	Second Division	30	21	2	1	32	22
Nottingham Forest	1953–54	Second Division	14	10	1	0	15	10
Nottingham Forest	1954–55	Second Division	13	2	0	0	13	2
Nottingham Forest	Total		182	123	9	1	191	124
Career total			306	221	22	8	327	229
