= Vale Park =

Football stadium in Stoke-on-Trent, England

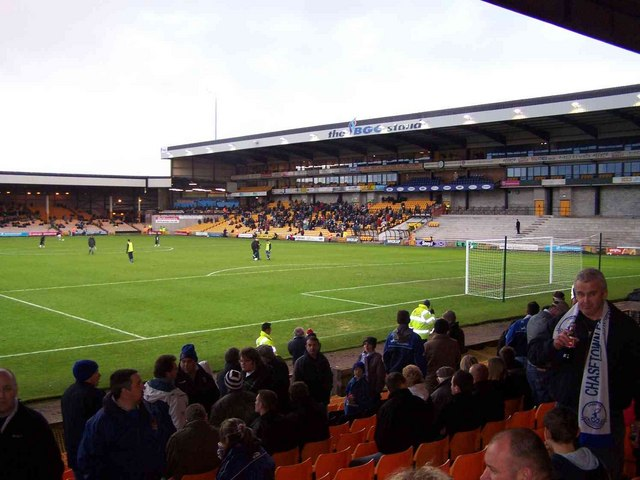
- Port Vale FC versus Chasetown FC in the FA Cup in 2007
- Interactive map of Vale Park
- Address: Hamil Road; Burslem; Stoke-on-Trent ST6 1AW; Staffordshire; England
- Coordinates: 53°2′59″N 2°11′33″W
- Elevation: 520 feet (160 m)
- Owner: Port Vale F.C.
- Capacity: 16,800
- Surface: Grass
- Scoreboard: Yes
- Record attendance: 49,768 v. Aston Villa; 20 February 1960
- Field size: 114 yards (104 m) x 77 yards (70 m)

Construction
- Groundbreaking: 1944
- Built: 1950
- Opened: 24 August 1950
- Renovated: 1989–98 (converted to all-seater stadia)
- Expanded: 1954 (Railway Stand); 1989 (Disabled Stand)
- Cost: £50,000

Tenant
- Port Vale F.C. (1950–present)

Vale Park is a football stadium in the area of Burslem, Stoke-on-Trent, Staffordshire, England, and it has been the home ground of Port Vale Football Club since its opening in 1950. It has a capacity of 15,695 for unallocated seated games, rising to 16,800 for matches with allocated seating, having been renovated during 1989–1998 to become an all-seater stadium.

The ground has seen its capacity go up and down, its official peak being 42,000 in 1954 against Blackpool, although a club record 49,768 managed to squeeze in for a 1960 FA Cup fifth round fixture against Aston Villa. The highest recorded all-seated attendance at Vale Park is currently 16,326 for an EFL Cup tie against Arsenal on 24 September 2025.

== Overview ==
At 525 feet above sea level, it is the eleventh-highest ground in the country and second-highest in the English Football League. The pitch is clay underneath the grass, rather than sand. These two factors make the pitch vulnerable to freezing temperatures. It is an extremely dry pitch, which often makes passing football quite difficult. There is also a coal seam under the pitch, and numerous mine shafts dotted around the local area, including many under the park opposite the ground.

The Vale Park pitch is one of the widest in the Football League. The pitch was originally laid over a filled-in marl hole and does not have a subsoil structure so is liable to flooding as it lacks proper drainage; a complete re-laying of the pitch would be needed to fix the issue). Denis Dawson was head groundsman from 1966 to 1975; he succeeded Len Parton and was followed by Graham Mainwaring. The head groundsman from 1992 to 2022 was Steve Speed. He was succeeded by Steve Alderson, who oversaw extensive pitch renovations financed by the Shanahan family.

== History ==
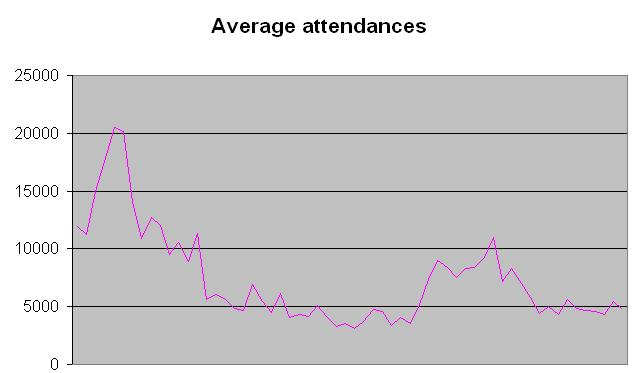
Average attendances, 1950–2010.

Following the club being informed that they would be evicted from the Old Recreation Ground by Stoke-on-Trent City Council, plans for a new stadium in a new area began. In 1944, Hamil Road – the site of a former clay pit – was chosen, a site opposite Burslem Park, where the club had played its football in the early years of its existence. The development became known as The Wembley of the North due to the planned size of the stadium, plans which included an 80,000 capacity with room for 1,000 parked cars. The club's leadership had not allowed the club's third-tier status or lack of money to curb their ambition. Lifetime seats were sold for £100 (the price of admission for roughly 200 matches), but fewer than 100 fans bought them. Also costing £100, the pitch was the most expensive ever laid in the country at the time.

The ground opened in 1950, having eventually cost £50,000, and boasting a capacity of 40,000 (360 seated). The original ground consisted of just two stands, the Railway stand and the Lorne Street main stand, with banks of terracing at the Bycars and Hamil ends of the ground. The Bycars end was originally the Swan Passage stand from the Old Recreation Ground, which was taken apart, moved across the city and re-erected as the funds for an entirely new stand had run out. The first match was a 1–0 victory over Newport County on 24 August 1950 in front of 30,196 rain-soaked spectators. Walter Aveyard took the honour of being the first to score at the ground. The stadium's name was revealed for the first time on the same day: Vale Park. The club considered naming the stadium after chairman Alderman William Arthur Holdcroft, whose persistence and vision had been central to its development.

Vale Park initially had problems with drainage, causing many games of the 1950–51 season to be postponed. The problem was finally resolved in summer 1960 when new drains were installed to help ease the winter mud spots.

In summer 1951, 578 seats were installed on the Railway Terrace, bringing the seated capacity of Vale Park to 1,010. In 1954, the all-seater Railway Stand was built, as capacity gradually increased to 50,000 by the decade's end. On 24 September 1958, Vale Park saw its first match under the new £17,000 floodlights, as the club beat West Bromwich Albion 5–3.

In summer 1973, the club erected a 2.5 feet high steel fence around the Bycars End to help combat hooliganism. A rare event occurred on 17 January 1976, when the Vale directors permitted rivals Stoke to play a home game against Middlesbrough at Vale Park. This happened because a severe gale severely damaged the Victoria Ground; whilst the gale also caused £2,000 worth of damage to Vale Park, the damage to Stoke's ground was much more severe. A crowd of 21,009 saw Stoke win 1–0.

In summer 1985, new safety regulations reduced Vale Park's capacity to 16,800 and later again to 16,300. The summer of 1988 saw Vale Park given a £40,000 upgrade to repair the floodlights and a £20,000 electronic scoreboard was installed at the Hamil End. Three executive boxes were also purchased from Newcastle United, whilst facilities were opened to the local community. The following year the stadium was upgraded for £250,000. However, grants helped to halve the cost for the club itself. In November 1989, a £100,000 disabled stand was installed –the country's first purpose-built enclosure. Despite this effort, inspectors closed the Bycars End down due to safety issues and reduced the stadium's capacity to 12,000 after cutting the capacity of the Railway Paddock by two-thirds.

In summer 1990, 3,750 yellow and white seats were fitted in the Railway Paddock, and 1,121 seats were added to the upper tier of the Bycars End. The Bycars End roof was also removed for safety reasons, whilst a police box was constructed between the Railway Paddock and the Hamil End. The paddock at the front of the Railway Stand was later made into an all-seated area, with just the Lorne Street side left as a standing area. Vale fans stood for the last time on Lorne Street at the end of the 1997–98 season, with the stand being demolished before work began on a new £3 million structure. Work has yet to be finished due to a lack of finances and a change in club ownership. Despite the building work remaining uncompleted, the work done on the stadium under Bill Bell from 1985 had vastly improved the ground, as proven by the fact that sheep were once housed in the Railway Paddock toilets and allowed to graze on the pitch in the night; the toilets were notoriously unhygienic and were replaced under Bill Bratt's reign in 2006.

The Valiant 2001 Charter stated that Bratt's management team would invest £400,000 to install under-soil heating in mid-2002, and to also quickly complete the Lorne Street stand. However, it took until 2020 for the seats to be installed. Chairman Norman Smurthwaite separated Vale Park from Port Vale after taking the club out of administration in 2012. New high-tech floodlights were fitted in March 2019, paid for by the club's shirt sponsor. The stadium's ownership was returned to the club after Smurthwaite sold the club to Carol and Kevin Shanahan in May 2019. Five months later, it was declared an "asset of community value status" by Stoke-on-Trent city council. The Shanahans spent £500,000 on ground improvement by summer 2021. Another £1.2 million was spent the following summer in order to make Vale Park a Championship standard ground. The club spent a further £2 million in 2026 improving the pitch to a hybrid turf system and improving the training pitches.

== Structure and facilities ==
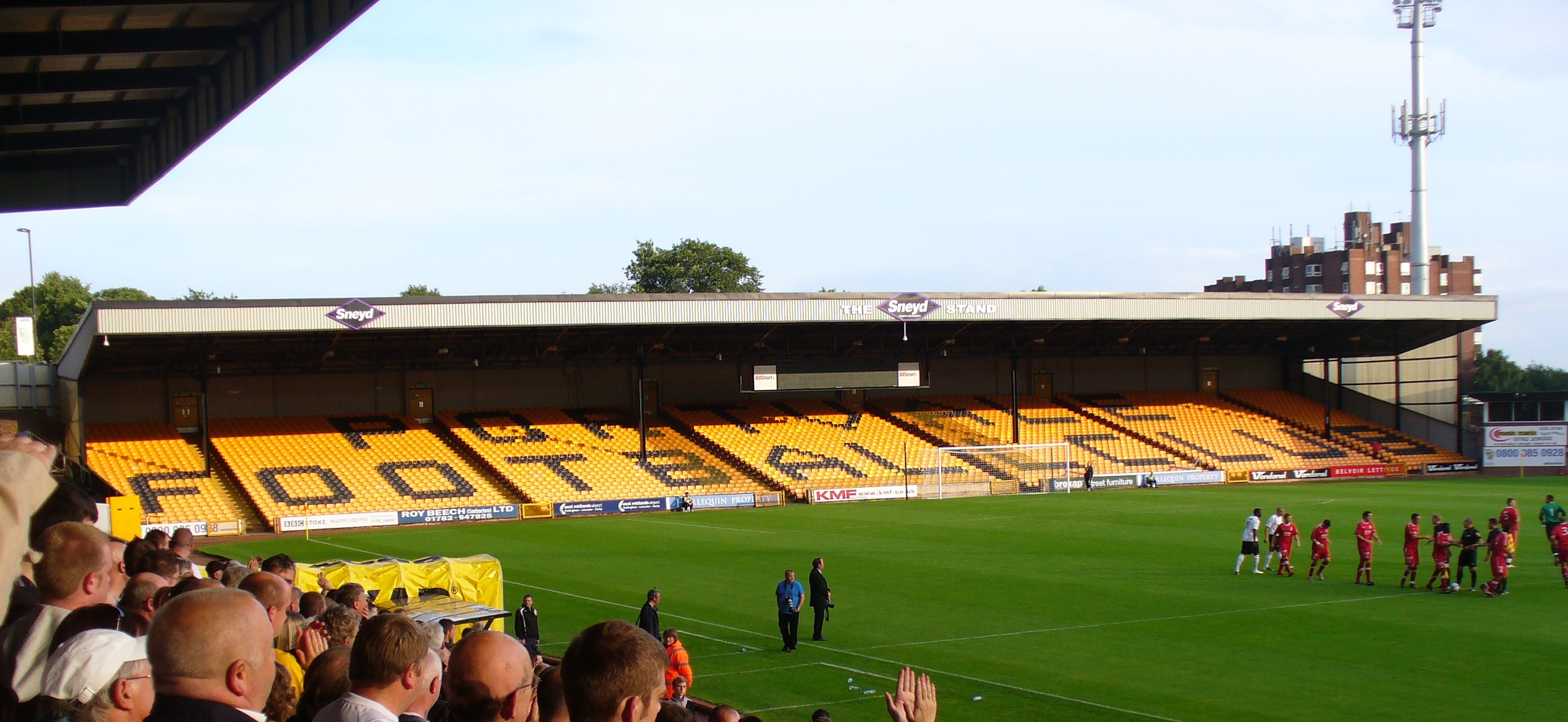
The Hamil Road Stand.

The current stadium includes around 19,000 seats of which 16,800 are available for spectators and has four stands: Lorne Street opposite to the Railway Stand/Paddock, and the Bycars End facing the Hamil Road End. The Lorne Street Stand is relatively new, with 2,045 useable seats and 48 executive boxes that host 711 people. It was not completed when it opened in 1999, and although 1,500 missing seats were finally installed in April 2020 to visually complete the stand, over 2,000 seats remain unusable for spectators pending the reinstatement and fitting out of spectator concourse facilities in the Hamil half of the stand. The stand acts as the ground's grandstand, containing the stadium's main entrance, dressing rooms, club offices and enterprise centre. The Hamil End has 4,514 seats with the blocks nearest the Lorne St side allocated as the Family section, and a Fanzone area housed behind the stand. The Railway Stand has a capacity of 2,094 and for most matches with unreserved seating, the Railway Paddock has a capacity of 2,862. The 3,363 capacity Bycars End has housed away supporters since 2023. The Accessibility Stand located between the Lorne Street Stand and the Bycars End has room for 106 spectators whilst the former Family Stand located between the Bycars End and the Railway Stand has been unused for spectators since 2023 when a large video screen was installed there.

== Other events ==
On 1 August 1981, Vale Park hosted a one-off rock concert, Heavy Metal Holocaust, featuring Motörhead, Ozzy Osbourne Band, Mahogany Rush, Triumph, Riot and Vardis. Around 20,000 attended the concert, raising £25,000 for the club. Lars Ulrich was also in attendance, months before he co-founded Metallica.

In 1985, the Stoke Spitfires American football team used the ground for matches. The stadium has hosted three England under-18 games. The first was a 7–2 win over Switzerland in November 1992 (which saw a Robbie Fowler hat-trick); the second was a 1–1 draw with Romania in September 1993; and the third was a goalless draw with Norway in June 2005. It also hosted a full international women's match on 7 April 2017, when England played Italy.

== Records ==
A club record 49,768 attended a 1960 FA Cup fifth round fixture against Aston Villa. Other historic matches include the defeat of two reigning FA Cup champions in the competition, as Stanley Matthews' Blackpool were beaten 2–0 in February 1954, and then 42 years later holders Everton were dumped out 2–1. The biggest victory in a competitive match came in December 1958 when Gateshead were beaten 8–0.
