= 1944–45 Port Vale F.C. season =

Port Vale F.C.
1944–45 season
- Chairman: Tom Flint
- Manager: Jack Diffin (October – December); David Pratt (December onwards)
- Stadium: Old Recreation Ground
- North First Championship: 46th (12 points)
- North Second Championship: 54th (12 points)
- League North Cup: 48th (7 points)
- Midland Cup: Did not qualify
- Top goalscorer: League: Alf Bellis, Eric Prince (5 each); All: Alf Bellis (10)
- Highest home attendance: 17,040 vs. Stoke City, 24 February 1945
- Lowest home attendance: 2,195 vs. Walsall, 23 December 1944
- Average home league attendance: 5,969
- Biggest win: 5–0 vs. Stockport County, 3 March 1945
- Biggest defeat: 1–8 vs. Stoke City, 17 February 1945
Home colours

The 1944–45 season was Port Vale's second season of football in the wartime league system of World War II. Under the stewardship of club director Jack Diffin — who managed from October to December before David Pratt took over (though he was never cleared by the RAF to actually manage a game) — the Valiants entered the Football League North First Championship, finishing 46th out of 54 clubs with just 18 matches played, accruing 12 points with 5 wins, 2 draws and 11 defeats.

Their cup campaigns were no better: they came 54th in the War League Cup with 12 points, 48th in the League North Cup with 7 points, and failed to qualify for the Midland Cup. Alf Bellis was the top scorer with ten goals in all competitions (including five in the league, level with Eric Prince), while home attendances ranged from a high of 17,040 (versus Stoke City on 24 February 1945) to just 2,195 (against Walsall on 23 December), averaging 5,969 for the season. Though limited success plagued the season, Port Vale managed a financial profit of £1,262, largely thanks to gate receipts of £11,200 despite severe challenges on and off the pitch.

== Overview ==
Port Vale resumed first-team football for the first time since the 1939–40 season, entering the North Championship of the war league, which contained 54 teams but required only 18 games to be played by each club. The junior team had been active since then, and the club hoped they could perform at a senior level, supplemented by guest players. A good crowd of 8,768 turned up at the Old Recreation Ground for the season-opener to Birmingham, and a 3–0 victory offered hope of a successful season. However, they lost the reverse fixture 4–0 and went on to pick up only one more point by the end of September. Their home performances were generally competent, but they ended the league with only one point on the road. Vale ended the league programme in 46th place, having accrued just 12 points from their 18 games.

A ten-game series for qualification to the League North Cup began in December. The club appointed David Pratt to manage the players, succeeding director Jack Diffin, though Pratt failed to gain clearance from the Royal Air Force and so never actually took charge of a game. Vale managed to win 3–2 away at Chester on 6 January but lost six games of the series, including heavy 8–1 and 6–2 defeats to Potteries derby rivals Stoke City. A seven games series of the North Championship followed, which attracted little interest as crowds dwindled. Though Vale managed to beat Stockport County 5–0, they lost five of their seven games, including two further poor defeats at the hands of Stoke City. The season concluded with four games of Midland Cup competition, of which Vale lost three. The opening game of the competition did, though, see a 3–2 win over Walsall; the Vale line-up included a 16-year-old Ronnie Allen and renowned Ireland international Peter Doherty. The club made a profit of £1,262 on the season, thanks to gate receipts of £11,200.

== Results ==
Win	Draw	Loss

=== North First Championship ===
==== League table ====
Pos	Team	Pld	W	D	L	GF	GA	GAv	Pts
45	Accrington Stanley	18	5	2	11	29	46	0.630	12
46	Port Vale	18	5	2	11	22	36	0.611	12
47	Bury	18	5	2	11	28	48	0.583	12

Source: Rec.Sport.Soccer Statistics Foundation

==== Matches ====
26 August 1944 1	Burslem Port Vale	3–0	Birmingham	Hanley
	Kirkaldy; Bellis			Stadium: Old Recreation Ground; Attendance: 8,768

2 September 1944 2	Birmingham	4–0	Burslem Port Vale	Birmingham
				Stadium: St Andrew's; Attendance: 5,970

9 September 1944 3	West Bromwich Albion	2–1	Burslem Port Vale	West Bromwich
			E.Prince	Stadium: The Hawthorns; Attendance: 7,760

16 September 1944 4	Burslem Port Vale	0–0	West Bromwich Albion	Hanley
				Stadium: Old Recreation Ground; Attendance: 8,134

23 September 1944 5	Northampton	3–1	Burslem Port Vale	Northampton
			E.Prince	Stadium: County Cricket Ground; Attendance: 3,125

30 September 1944 6	Burslem Port Vale	1–2	Northampton	Hanley
	B.Pointon			Stadium: Old Recreation Ground; Attendance: 6,549

7 October 1944 7	Burslem Port Vale	2–0	Coventry City	Hanley
	Musgrave; E.Prince			Stadium: Old Recreation Ground; Attendance: 6,600

14 October 1944 8	Coventry City	4–3	Burslem Port Vale	Coventry
			Pepper; E.Prince	Stadium: Highfield Road; Attendance: 5,000

21 October 1944 9	Leicester City	4–1	Burslem Port Vale	Leicester
			E.Prince	Stadium: Filbert Street; Attendance: 5,770

28 October 1944 10	Burslem Port Vale	2–1	Leicester City	Hanley
	Bellis; McDowell			Stadium: Old Recreation Ground; Attendance: 4,070

4 November 1944 11	Burslem Port Vale	2–1	Aston Villa	Hanley
	Bellis; Pointon			Stadium: Old Recreation Ground; Attendance: 9,700

11 November 1944 12	Aston Villa	4–0	Burslem Port Vale	Birmingham
				Stadium: Villa Park; Attendance: 8,500

18 November 1944 13	Stoke City	2–0	Burslem Port Vale	Stoke-upon-Trent
	Bowyer			Stadium: Victoria Ground; Attendance: 18,000

25 November 1944 14	Burslem Port Vale	3–0	Stoke City	Hanley
	McDowell; Bellis; P.Griffiths			Stadium: Old Recreation Ground; Attendance: 9,618

2 December 1944 15	Burslem Port Vale	0–3	Wolverhampton Wanderers	Hanley
				Stadium: Old Recreation Ground; Attendance: 7,500

9 December 1944 16	Wolverhampton Wanderers	2–0	Burslem Port Vale	Wolverhampton
				Stadium: Molineux Stadium; Attendance: 8,493

16 December 1944 17	Walsall	2–2	Burslem Port Vale	Walsall
			Clunn; Bellis	Stadium: Fellows Park; Attendance: 2,000

23 December 1944 18	Burslem Port Vale	1–2	Walsall	Hanley
	McDowell			Stadium: Old Recreation Ground; Attendance: 2,195

=== League North Cup ===
==== League table ====
Pos	Team	Pld	W	D	L	GF	GA	GAv	Pts
53	Swansea Town	20	6	1	13	42	63	0.667	13
54	Port Vale	21	5	2	14	27	60	0.450	12
55	Mansfield Town	12	5	1	6	22	38	0.579	11

Source: Rec.Sport.Soccer Statistics Foundation

==== Matches ====
25 December 1944 1	Burslem Port Vale	1–3	Crewe Alexandra	Hanley
	Ware			Stadium: Old Recreation Ground; Attendance: 5,500

30 December 1944 2	Crewe Alexandra	2–1	Burslem Port Vale	Crewe
			McDowell	Stadium: Gresty Road; Attendance: 5,000

6 January 1945 3	Chester	2–3	Burslem Port Vale	Chester
			Bellis; E.Prince	Stadium: Sealand Road; Attendance: 2,790

13 January 1945 4	Burslem Port Vale	0–2	Chester	Hanley
				Stadium: Old Recreation Ground; Attendance: 5,468

20 January 1945 5	Wrexham	5–0	Burslem Port Vale	Wrexham
15:30 BST		Report		Stadium: Racecourse Ground; Attendance: 2,165; Referee: W. Prescott

3 February 1945 6	Burslem Port Vale	2–0	Wolverhampton Wanderers	Hanley
	McDowell; Booth			Stadium: Old Recreation Ground; Attendance: 4,626

10 February 1945 7	Wolverhampton Wanderers	1–2	Burslem Port Vale	Wolverhampton
			Booth; Bellis	Stadium: Molineux Stadium; Attendance: 8,548

17 February 1945 8	Stoke City	8–1	Burslem Port Vale	Stoke-upon-Trent
	G Mountford; Sellars; Sale		Cardwell	Stadium: Victoria Ground; Attendance: 12,644

24 February 1945 9	Burslem Port Vale	2–6	Stoke City	Hanley
	McShane; B.Pointon		Sale; Steele; Soo	Stadium: Old Recreation Ground; Attendance: 17,040

17 March 1945 10	Burslem Port Vale	1–1	Wrexham	Hanley
15:00 GMT	Bellis	Report		Stadium: Old Recreation Ground; Attendance: 3,089

=== North Second Championship ===
26 December 1944 1	Wrexham	4–0	Burslem Port Vale	Wrexham
15:30 GMT		Report		Stadium: Racecourse Ground; Attendance: 7,668; Referee: S Bostock

3 March 1945 2	Burslem Port Vale	5–0	Stockport County	Hanley
	McShane; B.Pointon; Hall			Stadium: Old Recreation Ground; Attendance: 3,200

10 March 1945 3	Stockport County	3–0	Burslem Port Vale	Stockport
				Stadium: Edgeley Park; Attendance: 2,000

2 April 1945 4	Burslem Port Vale	2–2	Wrexham	Hanley
15:00 GMT	P.Griffiths	Report		Stadium: Old Recreation Ground; Attendance: 6,079; Referee: E. Bailey

28 April 1945 5	Burslem Port Vale	0–1	Tranmere Rovers	Hanley
				Stadium: Old Recreation Ground; Attendance: small

5 May 1945 6	Stoke City	6–0	Burslem Port Vale	Stoke-upon-Trent
	Basnett; G Mountford; Soo			Stadium: Victoria Ground; Attendance: 1,000

9 May 1945 7	Burslem Port Vale	2–4	Stoke City	Hanley
	Isherwood; H.Griffiths		Sellars; Kirton; Jackson	Stadium: Old Recreation Ground; Attendance: 5,550

=== Midland Cup ===
==== League table ====
Pos	Team	Pld	W	D	L	GF	GA	GAv	Pts
47	Southport	10	3	1	6	19	40	0.475	7
48	Port Vale	10	3	1	6	13	30	0.433	7
49	Bath City	10	3	0	7	28	34	0.824	6

Source: Rec.Sport.Soccer Statistics Foundation

==== Matches ====
24 March 1945 Q	Burslem Port Vale	3–2	Walsall	Hanley
	Clunn; Bellis			Stadium: Old Recreation Ground; Attendance: 5,870

31 March 1945 Q	Walsall	2–0	Burslem Port Vale	Walsall
				Stadium: Fellows Park; Attendance: 1,592

7 April 1945 Q	Burslem Port Vale	1–4	Notts County	Hanley
	F.Pointon			Stadium: Old Recreation Ground; Attendance: 5,790

14 April 1945 Q	Notts County	2–1	Burslem Port Vale	Nottingham
			Gregory	Stadium: Meadow Lane; Attendance: 3,000

== Squad statistics ==
=== Appearances and goals ===
Key to positions: GK – Goalkeeper; FB – Full back; HB – Half back; FW – Forward

No.	Pos	Nat	Player	Total		North Championship		League North Cup		Midland Cup	
No.	Pos	Nat	Player	Apps	Goals	Apps	Goals	Apps	Goals	Apps	Goals
	GK	(England) ENG	Albert Hankey	4	0	1	0	3	0	0	0
	GK	(England) ENG	Arthur Jepson	1	0	0	0	0	0	1	0
	GK	(England) ENG	Ron Mawson	1	0	1	0	0	0	0	0
	GK	(England) ENG	Harry Prince	33	0	23	0	7	0	3	0
	FB	(England) ENG	Arthur Bateman	13	0	3	0	8	0	2	0
	FB	(England) ENG	Jack Griffiths	10	0	8	0	1	0	1	0
	FB	(Wales) WAL	John Mills	1	0	0	0	1	0	0	0
	FB	(England) ENG	Sid Prince	1	0	1	0	0	0	0	0
	FB	(Scotland) SCO	Bob Pursell	9	0	8	0	0	0	1	0
	HB	(England) ENG	Harry Betmead	6	0	6	0	0	0	0	0
	HB	(England) ENG	Edwin Blunt	6	0	6	0	0	0	0	0
	HB	(England) ENG	Jackie Bray	1	0	1	0	0	0	0	0
	HB	(England) ENG	Louis Cardwell	8	1	1	0	6	1	1	0
	HB	(England) ENG	Arthur Cooper	26	0	17	0	6	0	3	0
	HB	(Scotland) SCO	Bertie Duffy	2	0	0	0	0	0	2	0
	HB	(England) ENG	Harry Griffiths	29	1	22	1	5	0	2	0
	HB	(England) ENG	George Hannah	3	0	0	0	3	0	0	0
	HB	(England) ENG	Stephen Hughes	1	0	1	0	0	0	0	0
	HB	(England) ENG	Harold Jervis	1	0	1	0	0	0	0	0
	HB	(England) ENG	Cyril Johnson	1	0	1	0	0	0	0	0
	HB	(Scotland) SCO	Jock Lowe	2	0	1	0	0	0	1	0
	HB	(England) ENG	Frank Marsh	2	0	1	0	1	0	0	0
	HB	(England) ENG	Alan Martin	3	0	3	0	0	0	0	0
	HB	(England) ENG	David Muir	3	0	3	0	0	0	0	0
	HB	(England) ENG	Jonty Musgrave	4	1	4	1	0	0	0	0
	HB	(England) ENG	Frank Pointon	14	1	6	0	4	0	4	1
	HB	(England) ENG	Wilf Smith	10	0	6	0	4	0	0	0
	HB	(England) ENG	Joe Wheatley	3	0	3	0	0	0	0	0
	FW	(England) ENG	Bob Allen	3	0	2	0	0	0	1	0
	FW	(England) ENG	Arthur Bailey	2	0	2	0	0	0	0	0
	FW	(England) ENG	Kenneth Banks	2	0	1	0	1	0	0	0
	FW	(England) ENG	Alf Bellis	25	10	13	5	8	4	4	1
	FW	(England) ENG	William Birks	3	0	2	0	1	0	0	0
	FW	(England) ENG	Billy Buckley	4	0	3	0	1	0	0	0
	FW	(England) ENG	Jack Clunn	15	3	7	1	5	0	3	2
	FW	(Scotland) SCO	Murdoch Dickie	2	0	2	0	0	0	0	0
	FW	(Wales) WAL	Phil Griffiths	5	3	2	1	2	2	1	0
	FW	(England) ENG	Jack Kirkaldy	5	2	5	2	0	0	0	0
	FW	(England) ENG	John Maund	1	0	1	0	0	0	0	0
	FW	(Scotland) SCO	Harry McShane	3	3	1	2	2	1	0	0
	FW	(England) ENG	Roy Meredith	2	0	2	0	0	0	0	0
	FW	(England) ENG	George Morrey	2	0	2	0	0	0	0	0
	FW	(England) ENG	George Moses	1	0	0	0	0	0	1	0
	FW	(England) ENG	Edward Nutting	3	0	1	0	2	0	0	0
	FW	(England) ENG	Robert Pepper	1	2	1	2	0	0	0	0
	FW	(England) ENG	Bill Pointon	8	4	6	3	1	1	1	0
	FW	(England) ENG	Eric Prince	21	6	13	5	7	1	1	0
	FW	(England) ENG	Richard Roberts	2	0	2	0	0	0	0	0
	FW	(England) ENG	John Roden	6	0	4	0	0	0	2	0
	FW	(England) ENG	John Sanderson	1	0	1	0	0	0	0	0
	FW	(England) ENG	Dennis Spender	1	0	1	0	0	0	0	0
	FW	(England) ENG	Jess Sproson	32	0	22	0	9	0	1	0
	FW	(England) ENG	James Tunnicliffe	2	0	1	0	1	0	0	0
	FW	(England) ENG	Dennis Wilshaw	1	0	1	0	0	0	0	0
	FW	(England) ENG	Bert Wright	14	0	14	0	0	0	0	0
	FW	(Wales) WAL	Dick Yates	1	0	0	0	1	0	0	0

=== Top scorers ===
Place	Position	Nation	Name	North First Championship	League North Cup	North Second Championship	Midland Cup	Total
1	FW	England	Alf Bellis	5	4	0	1	10
2	FW	England	Eric Prince	5	1	0	0	6
3	FW	Scotland	Isaac McDowell	3	2	0	0	5
4	FW	England	Bill Pointon	2	1	2	0	4
5	FW	Scotland	Harry McShane	0	1	2	0	3
–	FW	Wales	Phil Griffiths	1	0	2	0	3
–	FW	England	Jack Clunn	1	0	0	2	3
8	FW	England	Jack Kirkaldy	2	0	0	0	2
–	FW	England	Robert Pepper	2	0	0	0	2
–	FW	England	Cecil Booth	0	2	0	0	2
11	HB	England	Frank Pointon	0	0	0	1	1
–	HB	England	Harry Griffiths	0	0	1	0	1
–	HB	England	Louis Cardwell	0	1	0	0	1
–	HB	England	Jonty Musgrave	1	0	0	0	1
–	FW	England	Harry Ware	0	1	0	0	1
–	FW	England	Ralph Gregory	0	0	0	1	1
–	FW	Wales	Albert Hall	0	0	1	0	1
–	FW	England	Dennis Isherwood	0	0	1	0	1
			TOTALS	22	13	9	5	49

== Transfers ==
=== Transfers in ===
Date from	Position	Nationality	Name	From	Fee	Ref.
July 1944	FW	ENG	Kenneth Banks		Free transfer	
August 1944	FW	ENG	William Birks		Free transfer	
August 1944	FW	ENG	Ralph Gregory		Free transfer	
August 1944	HB	ENG	Harold Jervis	Stoke City	Free transfer	
August 1944	FW	ENG	James Mee		Free transfer	
August 1944	HB	ENG	Frank Pointon	Endon	Free transfer	
August 1944	GK	ENG	Harry Prince	Wolverhampton Wanderers	Free transfer	
September 1944	HB	ENG	Jonty Musgrave	Hartlepools United	Free transfer	
September 1944	FW	ENG	Robert Pepper	Stafford Boys' Club	Free transfer	
September 1944	FW	ENG	Eric Prince	Ipstones	Free transfer	
October 1944	FW	SCO	Murdoch Dickie	Port Vale	Free transfer	
October 1944	FW	SCO	Isaac McDowell	(Scotland) Cowdenbeath	Free transfer	
October 1944	FW	ENG	Roy Meredith		Free transfer	
December 1944	FW	ENG	Jack Clunn	Michelin	Free transfer	
December 1944	FB	ENG	Sid Prince	Michelin	Free transfer	
December 1944	FW	ENG	Dennis Spender	Radway	Free transfer	
February 1945	FW	ENG	Cecil Booth		Free transfer	
March 1945	FW	ENG	Leonard Howell		Free transfer	
March 1945	FW	ENG	John Roden		Free transfer	

=== Transfers out ===
Date from	Position	Nationality	Name	To	Fee	Ref.
1945	FW	ENG	Kenneth Banks		Released	
1945	FW	ENG	Roy Meredith		Released	
1945	HB	ENG	Jonty Musgrave		Released	
1945	FW	ENG	Dennis Spender		Released	
1945	FW	ENG	James Tunnicliffe		Released	
Summer 1945	FW	WAL	Phil Griffiths		Released	
Summer 1945	FW	ENG	Leonard Howell		Released	
Summer 1945	FB	ENG	Sid Prince	Ipstones	Free transfer	
