= Harry Griffiths (footballer, born 1912) =

English footballer and baseball player

Personal information
- Full name: Harry Stanley Griffiths
- Date of birth: 17 November 1912
- Place of birth: Liverpool, England
- Date of death: 11 June 1981 (aged 68)
- Place of death: Stoke-on-Trent, England
- Height: 5 ft 9 in (1.75 m)
- Position: Centre-half

Youth career
- 1930–1935: Everton

Senior career*
Years	Team	Apps	(Gls)
1935–1947	Port Vale	103	(3)
Total		103	(3)
- * Club domestic league appearances and goals

Harry Stanley Griffiths (17 November 1912 – 11 June 1981) was an English footballer and baseball international. He played as a centre-half for Everton between 1930 and 1935. Still, after failing to get a game, he moved on to Port Vale between 1935 and 1947, playing 190 games in all wartime and peacetime competitions. Outside the game, he was a Police officer and later became a parkkeeper.

== Career ==
Griffiths began his career at Everton in 1930, as the "Toffees" won promotion to the First Division as Second Division champions in 1930–31. They then topped the Football League in 1931–32, finishing two points ahead of Arsenal. Dropping to eleventh in 1932–33, Everton won the FA Cup, though Griffiths played no part in the final. They dropped to 14th in 1933–34, rising to eight in 1934–35. However, Griffiths played little part in these successes and never played a competitive match for the club during his time at Goodison Park; he did, however, represent England at baseball.

He joined Port Vale in May 1935. He played thirty games for the "Valiants" in 1935–36, as the club were relegated out of the Second Division after picking up just two points in their final five games. New manager Warney Cresswell, a former teammate at Everton, picked him just eight times in 1936–37, as the club finished mid-table in the Third Division North. Griffiths played 28 games in 1937–38, scoring on the final day of the season in a 1–1 draw with New Brighton; at the end of the season the club were transferred to the Third Division South. He was a key member of new manager Tom Morgan's defence in 1938–39, playing 37 games, and scoring in wins over Swindon Town and Bristol City at the Old Recreation Ground.

Griffiths joined the police at the outbreak of World War II, guesting on occasion for both Vale and Derby County during the war years. He suffered a severe scalp wound after colliding with iron railings during a 3–1 home defeat by Crewe Alexandra on Christmas day 1944; he received five stitches and returned to action the next week wearing a black beret.

He was one of six pre-war players who returned to the club in 1946, the others being George Heppell, Arthur Jepson, Alf Bellis, Wilf Smith, and Don Triner. However, he lost his place in the team after manager Billy Frith was replaced by Gordon Hodgson in October 1946, and was released at the end of the 1946–47 season, having made just eight appearances. He played a total of 190 games (103 in the Football League) for Port Vale, scoring 9 goals (3 in the Football League).

== Personal life ==
After leaving football, he joined Meir Heath Cricket Club as a wicketkeeper. He later became a park keeper at Queens Park in Longton.

He married his wife, Rene, in 1941. She nursed him during his long illness before his death. She died in 2008 at the age of 96.

== Career statistics ==
Appearances and goals by club, season and competition
Club	Season	League			FA Cup		Other		Total	
Club	Season	Division	Apps	Goals	Apps	Goals	Apps	Goals	Apps	Goals
Port Vale	1935–36	Second Division	27	0	3	0	0	0	30	0
Port Vale	1936–37	Third Division North	8	0	0	0	0	0	8	0
Port Vale	1937–38	Third Division North	27	1	1	0	0	0	28	1
Port Vale	1938–39	Third Division South	33	2	2	0	2	1	37	3
Port Vale	1939–40		0	0	0	0	2	0	2	0
Port Vale	1945–46		0	0	6	0	0	0	6	0
Port Vale	1946–47	Third Division South	8	0	0	0	—		8	0
Port Vale	Total		103	3	12	0	4	1	119	4
