= Len Wootton =

English footballer

Personal information
- Full name: Leonard Wootton
- Date of birth: 13 June 1925
- Place of birth: Stoke-on-Trent, England
- Date of death: 9 September 1990 (aged 65)
- Place of death: Hartshill, Stoke-on-Trent, England
- Height: 5 ft 6 in (1.68 m)
- Position: Forward

Senior career*
Years	Team	Apps	(Gls)
1945–1947	Port Vale	10	(1)
1949–1951	Queen of the South	15	(1)
1951–1952	Wrexham	20	(2)
Total		45	(4)
- * Club domestic league appearances and goals

Leonard Wootton (13 June 1925 – 9 September 1990) was an English footballer who played as a forward for Port Vale, Queen of the South, and Wrexham. He won the Scottish Football League Division Two title with Queen of the South in 1950–51.

== Career ==
Wootton joined Port Vale in August 1945 and played regularly in the war leagues. As the 1946–47 season returned to the pre-war norms, he only played ten Third Division South and four FA Cup games before being replaced on the right-wing by Don Triner. He scored his first goal in the Football League in a 2–1 win over Crystal Palace at Selhurst Park on 26 October. He also scored two goals in the FA Cup in wins over Finchley and Watford at the Old Recreation Ground. However, he asked manager Gordon Hodgson for a transfer in January 1947 and was released in the summer. He moved on to Jimmy McKinnell's Queen of the South in Scotland. The "Doonhamers" were relegated out of the First Division at the end of the 1949–50 season, only to win the Division Two title in 1950–51. He scored one goal in 19 league games at Palmerston Park. He went on to score two goals in 20 Third Division North games for Peter Jackson's Wrexham in the 1951–52 season.

== Career statistics ==
Appearances and goals by club, season and competition
Club	Season	League			FA Cup		Total	
Club	Season	Division	Apps	Goals	Apps	Goals	Apps	Goals
Port Vale	1945–46	–	0	0	1	0	1	0
Port Vale	1946–47	Third Division South	10	1	3	2	13	3
Port Vale	Total		10	1	4	2	14	3
Wrexham	1951–52	Third Division North	20	2	2	0	22	2

== Honours ==
Queen of the South

- Scottish Football League Division Two: 1950–51
