= 1946–47 Port Vale F.C. season =

Port Vale F.C.
1946–47 season
- Chairman: William Holdcroft
- Manager: Billy Frith (until 11 October); Gordon Hodgson (from October)
- Stadium: Old Recreation Ground
- Football League Third Division South: 10th (43 points)
- FA Cup: Fourth Round (eliminated by Blackburn Rovers)
- Top goalscorer: League: Morris Jones (23); All: Morris Jones (26)
- Highest home attendance: 14,490 vs. Exeter City, 7 September 1946
- Lowest home attendance: 4,928 vs. Bournemouth, 10 March 1947
- Average home league attendance: 10,582
- Biggest win: 5–1 (three games)
- Biggest defeat: 0–4 vs. Cardiff City, 12 October 1946
Home colours

The 1946–47 season was Port Vale's 35th season of football in the English Football League and their second full season in the Third Division South. Under the early stewardship of Billy Frith — who resigned in October amid disputes over transfers and board interference — and succeeded by Gordon Hodgson, the Valiants competed in the Third Division South, finishing 10th with 43 points.

In the FA Cup, Vale advanced to the Fourth Round, following a replay victory over Watford in the Second Round and progress into later stages before elimination. Morris Jones was the standout striker, finishing as both league top scorer with 23 goals and season top scorer with 26 in all competitions. The campaign drew an average home attendance of 10,582, with the lowest turnout being 4,928 for the Bournemouth match on 10 March 1947. Vale also began a remarkable defensive run at home: from 19 October 1946 through 13 March 1948, opponents failed to keep a clean sheet in 33 consecutive home league games, a club record.

Though mid-table in the league, Vale laid firm groundwork for future endeavours, introducing future legends Tommy Cheadle and Ronnie Allen to first-team duties and continuing work on their new stadium development, dubbed "The Wembley of the North".

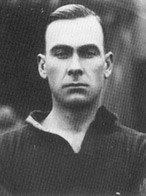
Manager Gordon Hodgson during his playing days.

== WWII Football ==
Two games into a standard 1939–40 season, Vale were bottom of the Third Division South, and when war was initiated on 1 September all sports gatherings were prohibited and the season was cancelled. A week later and Stoke-on-Trent was one of many places to be permitted to host football matches. However, almost all of the club's players volunteered or were conscripted to fight Nazi Germany. Vale played numerous friendlies, as well as taking part in the regional war leagues. They finished eighth in the West League in 1939–40. Unable to raise sufficient finances from 1940 onwards, they only put forward an amateur side filled with young players in the North Staffordshire League, also entering cup competitions such as The Sentinel Cup. They recorded some very one-sided victories over local amateur teams such as Shelton Labour, Hanley Deep Pit, and Northwood Mission. Some of Vale's top professionals signed to sides such as Stoke City, Crewe Alexandra, and Manchester United. Players that guested for the club included names such as Peter Doherty, Micky Fenton, Frank Soo and Dennis Wilshaw. Guest players often made up half of the first XI, filling the gaps left by Vale's players on active service.

The club came close to folding in the summer of 1943 when club president Mayor W.M.Huntbach died, leaving the club liable for £3,000 worth of debt, in addition to the £1,000 a year debit they recorded during the war. Appeals to The Football Association fell on deaf ears. The directors, therefore, agreed to a £13,500 sale of the Old Recreation Ground to Stoke-on-Trent Corporation (the local council). Their application to the council to rent the stadium back was rejected. The sale was agreed without the support of shareholders. However, the directors justified the sale by arguing that the stadium was a financial burden, especially as local vandals, hooligans and yobs regularly stole and trashed areas of the stadium. Nevertheless, Port Vale were then a club without any professional players or a stadium. In October 1943, the council relented and allowed rent to be paid until April 1944. The council agreed to rent the stadium for a longer term for £400 a year.

The search for a new ground took them to Hamil Road, Burslem, opposite a site the club occupied between 1884 and 1886. The rough land used for fly-tipping was valued at £30,000. The Brownhills Estates Company and the Supporters' Club launched a New Ground Appeal. In September 1944, the land was acquired. Work began on a 70,000 capacity 'Wembley of the North'. These were ambitious plans for a club that had in the past recorded attendances as low as 3,000 from fair-weather fans. In the meantime the club took part in the 1944–45 Football League North league. Club director and former Northern Ireland international Jack Diffin took the position of manager. He was replaced by David Pratt in December 1944. For the 1945–46 season, they were placed in the Third Division South (North Region), with new manager Billy Frith. The Council agreed to allow the Vale to rent The Old Recreation Ground until 24 June 1950. Plans for the new stadium now were expanded to a massive 80,000 capacity.

Three former Port Vale players known to have been killed in the war were Tom Cooper, Haydn Dackins, and Sam Jennings. Meanwhile, Jack Roberts became a hero without losing his life, rising to the rank of Sergeant, he was captured in Tunisia, however, managed to escape from a prisoner-of-war camp to return home.

== Overview ==
=== Third Division South ===
Of the 1938–39 squad there were six who returned for the 1946–47 campaign: goalkeepers George Heppell and Arthur Jepson; defender Harry Griffiths; and midfielders Alf Bellis, Wilf Smith, and Don Triner. The rest had been recruited between 1939 and 1946. Three players specifically recruited in summer 1946 to help win promotion were experienced forward Colin Lyman (signed from Tottenham Hotspur for 'fairly substantial fee'); 'the assassin' Garth Butler (Derby County); and half-back Norman Hallam (Chelsea). Also £1,000 was spent on "The Rec", with 23 new barriers and six new turnstiles installed. Tickets were priced at £5 for a season, or one shilling on the day.

The season started with a goalless draw at the Withdean Stadium before a 2–1 defeat by Exeter City in front of 14,490 home fans. This attendance was excellent, though it would not be bettered all season. With Heppell in fine form in goal, Jepson was sold to Stoke City for £3,750. On 23 September, Vale recorded a 4–1 win over Notts County, though only one point was gained from the following four games. With Vale in poor form at the bottom of the league, manager Billy Frith resigned on 11 October, detailing a list of complaints against the directors, generally accusing them of undermining him and failing to support him sufficiently. Soon Cardiff City won at "the Rec" by four goals to nil, after which Lyman put in a transfer request. On 17 October, the club bought Jimmy Todd from Blackpool for then-club record fee, on the recommendation of Stanley Matthews. Lyman was then sold to Nottingham Forest for a higher fee than was paid for him earlier in the year. Gordon Hodgson was then appointed manager ahead of forty other applicants. His first game was a 5–1 home victory over Reading, though a 4–1 loss at Walsall came a week later. Finding his team unconvincing away from home, he soon began to search for new players.

Results soon turned around, and Hodgson's coaching and planning were credited with the success. A 4–1 victory over Mansfield Town on 18 January was the club's tenth game unbeaten in all competitions. However, many games were put on hold until May due to the exceptionally disruptive winter weather. Hodgson also helped set up a youth program, arranging visits to schools, trials, and running two junior sides. In March, he signed centre-half Eric Eastwood from Manchester City for a four-figure fee. Experimenting with the first eleven, from 10 March to 19 April the team went on a run of one victory in eight games and conceded 11 goals in the first three games of April. Promotion hopeless and re-election unlikely, the experiments proceeded into the postponed games in May, when high-scoring victories at home followed three consecutive away 1–0 defeats to Crystal Palace and Southend United. Also the experienced Jack Smith was brought in from Manchester United.

They finished in tenth place with 43 points from 42 games. Top scorer Morris Jones hit a total of 26 goals, with double-figure hauls from Bill Pointon and Alf Bellis.

=== Finances ===
On the financial side, a profit of £4,133 was recorded, a club record. League football had brought £20,872 in gross gate receipts, with the wage bill at £8,927. Twenty-one players were retained, and Harry Griffiths's retirement was the only departure of note.

=== FA Cup ===
In the FA Cup, Vale beat amateur side Finchley by five goals to nil. They overcame league rivals Watford 2–1 in a "stern duel" after a replay. Hodgson organised a retreat to the old Royal Brine Baths in Stafford preparation for the third round tie with Second Division Millwall and was rewarded with a "grand display" as Vale ran out convincing 3–0 winners. They came unstuck in the fourth round with a 2–0 defeat at Ewood Park to First Division club Blackburn Rovers in front of 32,900 spectators.

== Results ==
=== Football League Third Division South ===
==== League table ====
Pos	Team	Pld	W	D	L	GF	GA	GAv	Pts
8	Southend United	42	17	10	15	71	60	1.183	44
9	Reading	42	16	11	15	83	74	1.122	43
10	Port Vale	42	17	9	16	68	63	1.079	43
11	Torquay United	42	15	12	15	52	61	0.852	42
12	Notts County	42	15	10	17	63	63	1.000	40

==== Results by matchday ====
Round	1	2	3	4	5	6	7	8	9	10	11	12	13	14	15	16	17	18	19	20	21	22	23	24	25	26	27	28	29	30	31	32	33	34	35	36	37	38	39	40	41	42
Ground	A	H	H	A	A	H	H	A	A	H	H	A	H	A	H	A	A	A	A	H	H	A	H	H	A	H	A	H	H	A	H	H	A	A	H	A	H	A	A	A	H	H
Result	D	L	D	W	L	W	D	L	L	L	W	W	W	L	W	L	L	D	D	W	W	D	W	W	L	W	W	W	D	L	W	L	L	L	D	D	W	L	L	L	W	W
Position	8	21	17	12	19	13	11	11	17	19	18	16	11	14	11	14	16	17	17	14	12	11	10	8	11	10	9	7	7	7	7	8	9	10	12	10	8	9	11	12	11	10
Points	1	1	2	4	4	6	7	7	7	7	9	11	13	13	15	15	15	16	17	19	21	22	24	26	26	28	30	32	33	33	35	35	35	35	36	37	39	39	39	39	41	43

Source: Statto
A = Away; H = Home; W = Win; D = Draw; L = Loss

==== Matches ====
31 August 1946 1	Brighton & Hove Albion	0–0	Port Vale	Hove
		Report		Stadium: Goldstone Ground; Attendance: 11,412

7 September 1946 2	Port Vale	1–2	Exeter City	Hanley
	M.Jones	Report	Regan; Ebdon	Stadium: Old Recreation Ground; Attendance: 14,490

9 September 1946 3	Port Vale	1–1	Northampton Town	Hanley
	Lyman	Report		Stadium: Old Recreation Ground; Attendance: 8,709

14 September 1946 4	Mansfield Town	0–3	Port Vale	Mansfield
		Report	Byrne; Bellis; M.Jones	Stadium: Field Mill; Attendance: 11,207

21 September 1946 5	Bristol City	3–0	Port Vale	Ashton Gate, Bristol
		Report		Stadium: Ashton Gate; Attendance: 21,284

23 September 1946 6	Port Vale	4–1	Notts County	Hanley
	Bellis; Byrne; M.Jones	Report		Stadium: Old Recreation Ground; Attendance: 8,574

28 September 1946 7	Port Vale	1–1	Swindon Town	Hanley
	M.Jones 36'	Report	Lloyd 55'	Stadium: Old Recreation Ground; Attendance: 12,900; Referee: T.S. Norcott

3 October 1946 8	Notts County	3–2	Port Vale	Nottingham
		Report	Pointon	Stadium: Meadow Lane; Attendance: 9,542

5 October 1946 9	Bournemouth	3–0	Port Vale	Bournemouth
		Report		Stadium: Dean Court; Attendance: 11,642

12 October 1946 10	Port Vale	0–4	Cardiff City	Hanley
	Richards; Clarke; Rees	Report		Stadium: Old Recreation Ground; Attendance: 10,724; Referee: AT Ford

19 October 1946 11	Port Vale	2–1	Torquay United	Hanley
	Bellis; M.Jones	Report		Stadium: Old Recreation Ground; Attendance: 10,618

26 October 1946 12	Crystal Palace	1–2	Port Vale	Selhurst, Croydon
		Report	Bellis; Wootton	Stadium: Selhurst Park; Attendance: 14,492

2 November 1946 13	Port Vale	5–1	Reading	Hanley
	Triner; Bellis; M.Jones; Pointon; Cheadle	Report		Stadium: Old Recreation Ground; Attendance: 10,891

9 November 1946 14	Walsall	4–1	Port Vale	Walsall
		Report	Hallam	Stadium: Fellows Park; Attendance: 12,171

16 November 1946 15	Port Vale	3–0	Watford	Hanley
	M.Jones	Report		Stadium: Old Recreation Ground; Attendance: 9,539

23 November 1946 16	Ipswich Town	2–1	Port Vale	Ipswich
		Report	Bellis	Stadium: Portman Road; Attendance: 13,001

7 December 1946 17	Queens Park Rangers	2–0	Port Vale	Shepherd's Bush, West London
	Harris; Mills	Report		Stadium: Loftus Road; Attendance: 14,251

21 December 1946 18	Bristol Rovers	0–0	Port Vale	Bristol
		Report		Stadium: Eastville Stadium; Attendance: 5,750

25 December 1946 19	Aldershot	0–0	Port Vale	Aldershot
		Report		Stadium: Recreation Ground; Attendance: 3,449

26 December 1946 20	Port Vale	4–2	Aldershot	Hanley
	Pointon; Prince; Triner	Report		Stadium: Old Recreation Ground; Attendance: 14,076

28 December 1946 21	Port Vale	4–1	Brighton & Hove Albion	Hanley
	Prince; M.Jones; Triner; Pointon	Report		Stadium: Old Recreation Ground; Attendance: 12,061

4 January 1947 22	Exeter City	1–1	Port Vale	Exeter
	Owen	Report	M.Jones	Stadium: St James Park; Attendance: 8,694

16 January 1947 23	Port Vale	2–1	Leyton Orient	Hanley
	Cheadle; M.Jones	Report		Stadium: Old Recreation Ground; Attendance: 6,753

18 January 1947 24	Port Vale	4–1	Mansfield Town	Hanley
	Pointon; M.Jones; Triner	Report	Harkin	Stadium: Old Recreation Ground; Attendance: 14,390

1 February 1947 25	Swindon Town	2–1	Port Vale	Swindon
	Stephens 14'; Owen 83'	Report	M.Jones 12'	Stadium: County Ground; Attendance: 9,935; Referee: T.S. Norcott

17 February 1947 26	Port Vale	2–1	Bristol City	Hanley
	Pointon; Triner	Report		Stadium: Old Recreation Ground; Attendance: 8,264

8 March 1947 27	Reading	0–2	Port Vale	Reading, Berkshire
		Report	Pointon; Triner	Stadium: Elm Park; Attendance: 7,863

10 March 1947 28	Port Vale	1–0	Bournemouth	Hanley
	M.Jones	Report		Stadium: Old Recreation Ground; Attendance: 4,928

15 March 1947 29	Port Vale	2–2	Walsall	Hanley
	M.Jones	Report		Stadium: Old Recreation Ground; Attendance: 10,787

22 March 1947 30	Watford	2–0	Port Vale	Watford
	Davies; Dunderdale	Report		Stadium: Vicarage Road; Attendance: 6,370

29 March 1947 31	Port Vale	1–0	Ipswich Town	Hanley
	M.Jones	Report		Stadium: Old Recreation Ground; Attendance: 10,426

4 April 1947 32	Port Vale	1–3	Norwich City	Hanley
	Cheadle	Report		Stadium: Old Recreation Ground; Attendance: 13,978

5 April 1947 33	Leyton Orient	5–3	Port Vale	Leyton, East London
		Report	F.Jones; Bellis; Allen	Stadium: Brisbane Road; Attendance: 12,371

7 April 1947 34	Norwich City	3–0	Port Vale	Norwich
		Report		Stadium: Carrow Road; Attendance: 29,985

12 April 1947 35	Port Vale	2–2	Queens Park Rangers	Hanley
	Bellis; M.Jones	Report	Durrant; Boxshall	Stadium: Old Recreation Ground; Attendance: 12,500

19 April 1947 36	Southend United	1–1	Port Vale	Southend-on-Sea
		Report	M.Jones	Stadium: Southend Stadium; Attendance: 8,762

26 April 1947 37	Port Vale	2–1	Bristol Rovers	Hanley
	M.Jones; Eastwood	Report		Stadium: Old Recreation Ground; Attendance: 8,323

3 May 1947 38	Northampton Town	1–0	Port Vale	Northampton
		Report		Stadium: County Cricket Ground; Attendance: 6,258

10 May 1947 39	Cardiff City	1–0	Port Vale	Cardiff
	Richards	Report		Stadium: Ninian Park; Attendance: 36,732

24 May 1947 40	Torquay United	1–0	Port Vale	Torquay
		Report		Stadium: Plainmoor; Attendance: 5,943

26 May 1947 41	Port Vale	4–2	Crystal Palace	Hanley
	Allen; Pointon; Smith	Report		Stadium: Old Recreation Ground; Attendance: 10,414

31 May 1947 42	Port Vale	5–1	Southend United	Hanley
	M.Jones; Allen; Bellis	Report		Stadium: Old Recreation Ground; Attendance: 8,879

=== FA Cup ===
30 November 1946 R1	Port Vale	5–1	Finchley	Hanley
	Bellis; Pointon; M.Jones; Wootton	Report		Stadium: Old Recreation Ground; Attendance: 8,756

14 December 1946 R2	Watford	1–1	Port Vale	Watford
	Beckett	Report	M.Jones	Stadium: Vicarage Road; Attendance: 8,498

16 December 1946 Replay	Port Vale	2–1	Watford	Hanley
	M.Jones; Wootton	Report	Evans	Stadium: Old Recreation Ground; Attendance: 7,342

11 January 1947 R3	Millwall	0–3	Port Vale	New Cross, London
		Report	Pointon; Triner	Stadium: The Den; Attendance: 24,779

25 January 1947 R4	Blackburn Rovers	2–0	Port Vale	Blackburn
		Report		Stadium: Ewood Park; Attendance: 32,900

== Squad statistics ==
=== Appearances and goals ===
Key to positions: GK – Goalkeeper; FB – Full back; HB – Half back; FW – Forward

No.	Pos	Nat	Player	Total		Third Division South		FA Cup	
No.	Pos	Nat	Player	Apps	Goals	Apps	Goals	Apps	Goals
	GK	(England) ENG	George Heppell	47	0	42	0	5	0
	FB	(England) ENG	Garth Butler	12	0	12	0	0	0
	FB	(England) ENG	Jack Chew	12	0	9	0	3	0
	FB	(England) ENG	Fred Jones	12	1	12	1	0	0
	FB	(Scotland) SCO	Bob Pursell	37	0	32	0	5	0
	HB	(England) ENG	Tommy Cheadle	37	3	32	3	5	0
	HB	(England) ENG	Eric Eastwood	6	1	6	1	0	0
	HB	(England) ENG	Harry Griffiths	8	0	8	0	0	0
	HB	(England) ENG	Norman Hallam	27	1	22	1	5	0
	HB	(England) ENG	Basil Hayward	2	0	2	0	0	0
	HB	(England) ENG	Alan Martin	14	0	14	0	0	0
	HB	(England) ENG	Bill McGarry	7	0	7	0	0	0
	HB	(England) ENG	Ted Oldfield	1	0	1	0	0	0
	HB	(England) ENG	Wilf Smith	28	0	26	0	2	0
	HB	(Northern Ireland) NIR	Jimmy Todd	35	0	30	0	5	0
	FW	(England) ENG	Ronnie Allen	18	5	18	5	0	0
	FW	(England) ENG	Alf Bellis	43	12	38	10	5	2
	FW	(England) ENG	Billy Byrne	16	2	15	2	1	0
	FW	(England) ENG	Morris Jones	44	26	39	23	5	3
	FW	(England) ENG	Bill Pointon	35	14	30	11	5	3
	FW	(England) ENG	Eric Prince	18	2	14	2	4	0
	FW	(England) ENG	Jack Smith	3	1	3	1	0	0
	FW	(England) ENG	Don Triner	22	7	20	6	2	1
Players who featured but departed the club during the season:
	HB	(England) ENG	Arthur Cooper	4	0	4	0	0	0
	HB	(England) ENG	Ernie Willett	1	0	1	0	0	0
	FW	(England) ENG	Colin Lyman	11	1	11	1	0	0
	FW	(England) ENG	Eddie Davies	3	0	3	0	0	0
	FW	(England) ENG	Joe Dixon	1	0	1	0	0	0
	FW	(England) ENG	Len Wootton	13	3	10	1	3	2

=== Top scorers ===
Place	Position	Nation	Name	Third Division South	FA Cup	Total
1	FW	England	Morris Jones	23	3	26
2	FW	England	Bill Pointon	11	3	14
3	FW	England	Alf Bellis	10	2	12
4	FW	England	Don Triner	6	1	7
5	FW	England	Ronnie Allen	5	0	5
6	HB	England	Tommy Cheadle	3	0	3
–	FW	England	Len Wootton	1	2	3
8	FW	England	Billy Byrne	2	0	2
–	FW	England	Eric Prince	2	0	2
10	FW	England	Colin Lyman	1	0	1
–	FB	England	Fred Jones	1	0	1
–	HB	England	Eric Eastwood	1	0	1
–	FW	England	Norman Hallam	1	0	1
–	FW	England	Jack Smith	1	0	1
			TOTALS	68	11	79

== Transfers ==
=== Transfers in ===
Date from	Position	Nationality	Name	From	Fee	Ref.
May 1946	HB	ENG	Norman Hallam	Chelsea	Free transfer	
May 1946	HB	ENG	Basil Hayward	Northwood Mission	Free transfer	
May 1946	FW	ENG	Colin Lyman	Tottenham Hotspur	'fairly substantial'	
June 1946	FB	ENG	Garth Butler	Derby County	Free transfer	
June 1946	FB	ENG	Fred Jones	South Liverpool	Free transfer	
October 1946	FW	ENG	Joe Dixon	Northampton Town	Free transfer	
October 1946	HB	NIR	Jimmy Todd	Blackpool	'club record four-figure fee'	
March 1947	HB	ENG	Eric Eastwood	Manchester City	'four-figure fee'	
March 1947	FW	ENG	Jack Smith	Blackburn Rovers	'four-figure fee'	

=== Transfers out ===
Date from	Position	Nationality	Name	To	Fee	Ref.
October 1946	FW	ENG	Colin Lyman	Nottingham Forest	'substantial profit'	
November 1946	FW	ENG	Eddie Davies	Witton Albion	Free transfer	
January 1947	FW	ENG	Len Wootton	(Scotland) Queen of the South	Free transfer	
March 1947	FW	ENG	Joe Dixon	Witton Albion	Free transfer	
March 1947	HB	ENG	Ernie Willett	Witton Albion	Free transfer	
April 1947	HB	ENG	Arthur Cooper		Released	
July 1947	FW	ENG	Billy Byrne	Crewe Alexandra	Free transfer	
Summer 1947	FB	ENG	Jack Chew		Released	
Summer 1947	HB	ENG	Harry Griffiths		Released	
Summer 1947	FB	ENG	Fred Jones		Released	
Summer 1947	HB	ENG	Ted Oldfield		Released	
