= Joseph Dixon =

Joseph or Joe Dixon may refer to:

== Law and politics ==
- Joseph Dixon (North Carolina politician) (1828–1883), U.S. Representative from North Carolina
- Joseph M. Dixon (1867–1934), American politician from Montana
- Joseph A. Dixon (1879–1942), U.S. Representative from Ohio
- Joseph Dixon (Australian politician) (1911–2002), Tasmanian state politician

== Sports ==
- Joseph Dixon (Australian cricketer) (1836–1882), Australian cricketer
- Joseph Dixon (English cricketer) (1895–1954), English cricketer
- Joe Dixon (footballer, born 1916) (1916–2001), English footballer
- Joe Dixon (Australian footballer) (1940–2023), Australian rules footballer

== Others ==
- Joseph Dixon (inventor) (1799–1869), American inventor, entrepreneur; founder of what became the Dixon Ticonderoga Company
- Joseph Dixon (bishop) (1806–1866), Irish Roman Catholic Archbishop of Armagh
- Joseph K. Dixon (1856–1926), American clergyman and photographer; led the Wanamaker expeditions
- Joseph Dixon (soil scientist) (1906–1966), New Zealand soil chemist and scientific administrator
- Joe Dixon (musician) (1917–1998), American jazz reed musician
- Joe Dixon (actor) (born 1965), British television and film actor

== See also ==
- Joseph Dickson (disambiguation)
