= Morris Jones (footballer) =

English footballer

Personal information
- Full name: William Morris Jones
- Date of birth: 30 November 1919
- Place of birth: Liverpool, England
- Date of death: 1993 (aged 73–74)
- Place of death: Liverpool, England
- Height: 5 ft 9 in (1.75 m)
- Position: Centre-forward

Youth career
- South Liverpool

Senior career*
Years	Team	Apps	(Gls)
1939–1947	Port Vale	53	(26)
1947–1950	Swindon Town	94	(48)
1950–1951	Crystal Palace	17	(3)
1951–1952	Watford	27	(7)
Total		191	(84)
- * Club domestic league appearances and goals

William Morris Jones (30 November 1919 – 1993) was an English footballer. A centre-forward, he scored 84 goals in 191 league games in a 13-year career in the Football League.

Jones moved from South Liverpool to Port Vale in June 1939 but had to wait seven years to make his debut because of World War II. He was sold to Swindon Town for £2,500 in November 1947. He moved on to Crystal Palace three years before ending his career after spending the 1951–52 season with Watford. He was listed in the September 2002 book Swindon Town Football Club 100 Greats.

== Career ==
Jones performed well for South Liverpool in the Lancashire Combination in 1938–39, ousting the more experienced Jack Roscoe from the starting line-up. However, Jones found himself on the sidelines as South Liverpool won four trophies, including the Welsh Cup, in the spring of 1939. He signed with Port Vale in June 1939. Due to the Second World War it took until 31 August 1946, in a match against Brighton & Hove Albion, before he made his debut; in the interim he had guested four times (three times in the league) for Celtic in 1940. He scored his first Third Division South goal on 7 September, in a 2–1 defeat by Exeter City at the Old Recreation Ground. He scored a hat-trick past Watford in a 3–0 home win on 16 November, and also scored twice against Watford in the FA Cup. In total, he scored 26 goals in 44 appearances in 1946–47, becoming the club's top-scorer. He hit three goals in 14 games in 1947–48, all of the goals coming in a 6–4 win over Aldershot on 6 September.

Jones handed "Valiants" manager Gordon Hodgson a transfer request. His wish was granted in November 1947, when he was sold to league rivals Swindon Town for £2,500. Louis Page's "Robins" finished 16th in 1947–48, with Jones scoring 14 goals in 31 games. He then hit 25 goals in 43 appearances to help the club to rise to fourth place in 1948–49. He then scored 13 goals in 27 games, as Swindon finished in 14th place in 1949–50. Jones scored 52 goals in 101 league and cup appearances during his time at the County Ground. Following a £3,500 transfer in May 1950, he scored three goals in 17 league appearances for Crystal Palace in 1950–51, as the "Eagles" finished bottom of the Third Division South. He left Selhurst Park for Watford in March 1951. Haydn Green's "Hornets" finished three places above the bottom of the Third Division South at the end of the 1951–52 campaign. Despite scoring seven goals in 27 league games for a struggling team, Jones did not find another club after leaving Vicarage Road, though he did have a trial with Leyton Orient.

== Career statistics ==
Appearances and goals by club, season and competition
Club	Season	League			FA Cup		Total	
Club	Season	Division	Apps	Goals	Apps	Goals	Apps	Goals
Port Vale	1946–47	Third Division South	39	23	5	3	44	26
Port Vale	1947–48	Third Division South	14	3	0	0	14	3
Port Vale	Total		53	26	5	3	58	29
Swindon Town	1947–48	Third Division South	25	10	6	4	31	14
Swindon Town	1948–49	Third Division South	42	25	1	0	43	25
Swindon Town	1949–50	Third Division South	27	13	0	0	27	13
Swindon Town	Total		94	48	7	4	101	52
Crystal Palace	1950–51	Third Division South	17	3	1	0	18	3
Watford	1950–51	Third Division South	10	1	0	0	10	1
Watford	1951–52	Third Division South	17	6	1	0	18	6
Watford	Total		27	7	1	0	28	7
Career total			191	84	14	7	205	91
