= Eric Eastwood =

Eric Eastwood may refer to:

- Eric Eastwood (footballer) (1916–1991), British footballer
- Sir Eric Eastwood (engineer) (1910–1981), British engineer and Fellow of the Royal Society
