= Potteries =

Potteries may refer to:

- Pottery, or pottery manufacturing

== Places in England ==
- Staffordshire Potteries, the Stoke-on-Trent area, known as the after its once-important ceramics industry
- The Potteries Urban Area, a conurbation distinct from, and covering a larger area than, the Staffordshire Potteries
- Potteries Shopping Centre, a shopping centre in Hanley, Stoke-on-Trent

== Other uses ==
- Potteries, Shrewsbury and North Wales Railway, England and Wales
- Potteries dialect, of Midlands English
