= Fred Jones (footballer, born 1922) =

English footballer (1922–1989)

Personal information
- Full name: Frederick Arthur Jones
- Date of birth: 21 October 1922
- Place of birth: Stoke-on-Trent, England
- Date of death: December 1989 (age 77)
- Place of death: Rhuddlan, Wales
- Position: Right-back

Youth career
- South Liverpool

Senior career*
Years	Team	Apps	(Gls)
1946–1947	Port Vale	12	(1)
Total		12	(1)
- * Club domestic league appearances and goals

Frederick Arthur Jones (21 October 1922 – December 1989) was an English footballer who played as a right-back for Port Vale in the Football League shortly after World War II.

== Career ==
Jones played for South Liverpool before joining Port Vale in June 1946. He made twelve Third Division South appearances in the 1946–47 season, and scored one goal in a 5–3 defeat to Leyton Orient at Brisbane Road on 5 April. At the end of the season manager Gordon Hodgson allowed him to leave the Old Recreation Ground.

== Career statistics ==
Appearances and goals by club, season and competition
Club	Season	League			FA Cup		Other		Total	
Club	Season	Division	Apps	Goals	Apps	Goals	Apps	Goals	Apps	Goals
Port Vale	1946–47	Third Division South	12	1	0	0	0	0	12	1
