= Walter Keeley =

English footballer

Personal information
- Full name: Walter Keeley
- Date of birth: 1 April 1921
- Place of birth: Manchester, England
- Date of death: 1995 (aged 73–74)
- Height: 5 ft 9 1/2 in (1.77 m)
- Position: Outside left

Youth career
- RAF

Senior career*
Years	Team	Apps	(Gls)
1944–1946	Accrington Stanley (wartime)	54	(26)
1944–1946	Manchester United (wartime)	3	(1)
1946–1947	Accrington Stanley	48	(21)
1947–1948	Bury	7	(0)
1948	Port Vale	18	(3)
1948–1951	Accrington Stanley	101	(35)
1951–1952	Rochdale	4	(0)
- Fleetwood
- * Club domestic league appearances and goals

Walter Keeley (1 April 1921 – 1995) was an English footballer who played as an outside left in the 1940s and 1950s.

== Career ==
Keeley played for the Royal Air Force during the Second World War. He guested for both Accrington Stanley and Manchester United before joining Accrington Stanley permanently as a professional in 1946. Despite Keeley's healthy goal record, Accrington Stanley finished 20th in the 22-team Third Division North in 1946–47. He moved on to Bury of the Second Division in 1947–48 before he signed with Third Division South club Port Vale for 'a substantial fee', in exchange for Alf Bellis in January 1948. He made an excellent debut, scoring twice in a 3–0 win over Leyton Orient at the Old Recreation Ground on 10 January 1948. He played a further 15 games in 1947–48, but only scored one goal (against Newport County), and so lost his place in August 1948, two games into the 1948–49 season. He was sold to old club Accrington Stanley for £1,500 the next month. They finished one place and three points above the re-election zone in 1948–49, rose to 13th in 1949–50, and then finished 21st in 1950–51, and were forced to apply for re-election. He played for Stanley's league rivals Rochdale in 1951–52, who finished 21st, one place above Stanley. He later turned out for non-League side Fleetwood.

== Career statistics ==
Appearances and goals by club, season and competition
Club	Season	League			FA Cup		Total	
Club	Season	Division	Apps	Goals	Apps	Goals	Apps	Goals
Accrington Stanley	1945–46		0	0	6	3	6	3
Accrington Stanley	1946–47	Third Division North	36	13	2	1	38	14
Accrington Stanley	1947–48	Third Division North	12	8	0	0	12	8
Accrington Stanley	Total		48	21	8	4	56	25
Bury	1947–48	Second Division	7	0	0	0	7	0
Port Vale	1947–48	Third Division South	16	3	0	0	16	3
Port Vale	1948–49	Third Division South	2	0	0	0	2	0
Port Vale	Total		18	3	0	0	18	3
Accrington Stanley	1948–49	Third Division North	30	13	1	0	31	13
Accrington Stanley	1949–50	Third Division North	35	9	0	0	35	9
Accrington Stanley	1950–51	Third Division North	34	13	1	0	35	13
Accrington Stanley	1951–52	Third Division North	2	0	0	0	2	0
Accrington Stanley	Total		101	35	2	0	103	35
Rochdale	1951–52	Third Division North	4	0	1	0	5	0
Career total			178	59	11	4	189	63
