= 1947–48 Port Vale F.C. season =

Port Vale F.C.
1947–48 season
- Chairman: William Holdcroft
- Manager: Gordon Hodgson
- Stadium: Old Recreation Ground
- Football League Third Division South: 8th (43 points)
- FA Cup: First Round (eliminated by Crystal Palace)
- Top goalscorer: League: Ronnie Allen (13); All: Ronnie Allen (13)
- Highest home attendance: 18,147 vs. Notts County, 28 February 1948
- Lowest home attendance: 5,602 vs. Exeter City, 24 April 1948
- Average home league attendance: 13,569
- Biggest win: 7–0 vs. Watford, 15 September 1947
- Biggest defeat: 0–5 vs. Torquay United, 7 February 1948
Home colours

The 1947–48 season was Port Vale's 36th season of football in the English Football League, and their third full season in the Third Division South. Under the guidance of manager Gordon Hodgson and chairman William Holdcroft, the Valiants achieved an eighth‑place finish, amassing 43 points from 42 league fixtures, with just three away victories highlighting a stark home–away performance dichotomy.

In the FA Cup, Vale's run was brief, exiting in the First Round after a solitary tie, matching their league form in cup competition. Striker Ronnie Allen, then aged eighteen, emerged as the club's top scorer with 13 goals, which included consecutive hat‑tricks in home matches, underscoring his rapid rise through the ranks. Attendance figures remained healthy: an average crowd of 13,569, with the season’s lowest turnout of 5,602 against Exeter City on 24 April 1948, and the season's largest margin of victory — a 7–0 win over Watford on 15 September — demonstrating the team's occasional attacking flair.

Overall, while Vale maintained a solid mid‑table standing, inconsistencies — particularly on the road—and continued stadium redevelopment work meant that success remained elusive, setting the stage for further post-war rebuilding in subsequent seasons.

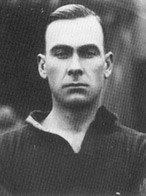
Manager Gordon Hodgson during his playing days.

== Overview ==
=== Third Division South ===
The pre-season saw the arrival of outside-right John Currie from Bournemouth & Boscombe Athletic. The total number of players at the club was 81, though the vast majority of these amateurs who never played for the first-team. Standing season tickets were reduced to £3 13s, in an attempt to boost support.

The season began with a 1–1 draw with Bristol Rovers in front of 15,714 supporters, followed four days later by a 2–1 win over Norwich City at Carrow Road. Following this the Vale were exceptional at home but poor away, as their unbeaten run at home reached 15 games. Their home form was exemplified by 6–4 and 7–0 wins over Aldershot and Watford respectively, in which Ronnie Allen scored a hat-trick in both games, and Morris Jones score a hat-trick past Aldershot. The defence seeming too weak for a promotion push, Harry Hubbick was signed from Bolton Wanderers in October. However, the team lost Alf Bellis to a foot fracture. The Sentinel's "Placer" complained of the weakened passing of the post-war generation, in both the Vale side and in footballers in general. In November, Morris Jones was sold to Swindon Town for £2,500, having handed in a transfer request. Gordon Hodgson searched for new attacking talents, leaving his players to relax with games of table tennis, darts, and reading material. Results began to improve, starting with a 4–1 home win over Ipswich Town in which Alan Martin was shifted to inside-left.

On Christmas day, a 5–0 win was recorded over Brighton & Hove Albion, with defender Tommy Cheadle put into the centre-forward role. This marked the start of a seven-match unbeaten run, which took the "Valiants" into fourth place by the end of January. Hodgson's policy of prioritising youth over experience led many older players to submit transfer requests. In January Alf Bellis was traded to Bury in exchange for Walter Keeley and 'a substantial fee'. Vale nevertheless ended the month with consecutive 4–1 home victories over Newport County and Crystal Palace. A 5–0 thrashing at muddy Plainmoor from Torquay United in February was followed by a win over Swindon Town which was disturbed by a dog on the pitch, whilst the week after came a draw in 3 inches (7.6 cm) of snow at Southend United. The club's promotion hopes faded with a defeat by Notts County at the Old Recreation Ground; a crowd of 18,147 turned up to see England star Tommy Lawton scoring the winner.

An impressive 2–1 win over league leaders Bournemouth & Boscombe Athletic was marred by spectators throwing stones onto the pitch. Vale then were beaten for only the second time at home by the new league leaders, Queens Park Rangers on 26 March, as they displayed "costly blunders in defence" and "a disconcerting naivety in attack". The following day, they recorded their last win of the season by beating Bristol City by a goal to nil. They failed to win in their last seven games, which cost them a third-place finish and the subsequent £165 in talent money. In preparation for next season, Joe Dale was signed from Manchester United for £1,000. The last game of the season attracted 5,602 spectators – the lowest total of the season – ironically, this was against Exeter City, their opponents in the highest attended home game of the previous campaign. This low attendance was partly blamed on the FA Cup final, which was broadcast simultaneously.

They finished in eighth place with 43 points, barely improving on the previous season. Ronnie Allen was the top-scorer with just 13 goals. Scoring was very much a team effort.

=== Finances ===
On the financial side, a loss of £1,292 was reported – mainly due to a transfer debit. Gate receipts had increased to £26,666 and the wage bill had risen drastically to £13,647. Cash was needed for the ongoing construction of 'The Wembley of the North', and so schemes such as the '100 Club' were introduced, offering supporters a seat for life at the stadium for £100. Meanwhile, Norman Hallam departed in the summer and left the area to become a Methodist Minister in Carlisle.

=== FA Cup ===
In the FA Cup, Vale fell at the first hurdle, losing 2–1 to Crystal Palace at Selhurst Park in a below-par performance. Unlike in the previous FA Cup campaign, the retreat to the old Royal Brine Baths in Stafford had failed to inspire the players.

== Results ==
=== Football League Third Division South ===
==== League table ====
Pos	Team	Pld	W	D	L	GF	GA	GAv	Pts
6	Notts County	42	19	8	15	68	59	1.153	46
7	Bristol City	42	18	7	17	77	65	1.185	43
8	Port Vale	42	16	11	15	63	54	1.167	43
9	Southend United	42	15	13	14	51	58	0.879	43
10	Reading	42	15	11	16	56	58	0.966	41

==== Results by matchday ====
Round	1	2	3	4	5	6	7	8	9	10	11	12	13	14	15	16	17	18	19	20	21	22	23	24	25	26	27	28	29	30	31	32	33	34	35	36	37	38	39	40	41	42
Ground	H	A	A	H	H	A	A	H	H	A	H	A	H	A	H	A	H	A	A	H	A	H	H	A	H	H	A	H	A	H	A	H	A	H	H	A	A	A	H	A	H	A
Result	D	W	L	W	W	D	L	W	D	L	W	L	D	L	W	L	W	W	L	W	D	W	W	D	W	W	L	W	D	L	L	W	L	L	W	L	L	D	L	D	D	D
Position	12	4	10	6	4	4	9	3	5	7	7	8	9	11	9	10	8	8	11	7	9	8	6	6	5	4	4	4	4	4	5	4	6	6	5	6	7	6	6	7	8	8
Points	1	3	3	5	7	8	8	10	11	11	13	13	14	14	16	16	18	20	20	22	23	25	27	28	30	32	32	34	35	35	35	37	37	37	39	39	39	40	40	41	42	43

Source: Statto
A = Away; H = Home; W = Win; D = Draw; L = Loss

==== Matches ====
23 August 1947 1	Port Vale	1–1	Bristol Rovers	Hanley
	Pointon	Report		Stadium: Old Recreation Ground; Attendance: 15,714

27 August 1947 2	Norwich City	1–2	Port Vale	Norwich
		Report	Cheadle; Smith	Stadium: Carrow Road; Attendance: 22,024

30 August 1947 3	Northampton Town	4–1	Port Vale	Northampton
		Report	Smith	Stadium: County Cricket Ground; Attendance: 9,404

1 September 1947 4	Port Vale	2–0	Norwich City	Hanley
	Pointon; Smith	Report		Stadium: Old Recreation Ground; Attendance: 11,688

6 September 1947 5	Port Vale	6–4	Aldershot	Hanley
	Allen; Jones	Report		Stadium: Old Recreation Ground; Attendance: 13,840

10 September 1947 6	Watford	1–1	Port Vale	Watford
	Hicklin	Report	Hallam	Stadium: Vicarage Road; Attendance: 8,802

13 September 1947 7	Crystal Palace	2–0	Port Vale	Selhurst, Croydon
		Report		Stadium: Selhurst Park; Attendance: 15,063

15 September 1947 8	Port Vale	7–0	Watford	Hanley
	Allen; Hallam; Smith	Report		Stadium: Old Recreation Ground; Attendance: 12,232

20 September 1947 9	Port Vale	1–1	Torquay United	Hanley
	Bellis	Report		Stadium: Old Recreation Ground; Attendance: 17,092

27 September 1947 10	Swindon Town	1–0	Port Vale	Swindon
	Lucas 85'	Report		Stadium: County Ground; Attendance: 16,828; Referee: W.T. Strainge

4 October 1947 11	Port Vale	2–1	Southend United	Hanley
	Allen; Smith	Report		Stadium: Old Recreation Ground; Attendance: 15,106

11 October 1947 12	Notts County	2–1	Port Vale	Nottingham
		Report	Bellis	Stadium: Meadow Lane; Attendance: 20,172

18 October 1947 13	Port Vale	1–1	Swansea Town	Hanley
	Smith	Report		Stadium: Old Recreation Ground; Attendance: 14,355

25 October 1947 14	Bournemouth & Boscombe Athletic	3–0	Port Vale	Bournemouth
		Report		Stadium: Dean Court; Attendance: 17,025

1 November 1947 15	Port Vale	4–1	Ipswich Town	Hanley
	Martin; Allen; Pointon	Report		Stadium: Old Recreation Ground; Attendance: 14,878

8 November 1947 16	Bristol City	2–1	Port Vale	Ashton Gate, Bristol
		Report	Allen	Stadium: Ashton Gate; Attendance: 27,740

15 November 1947 17	Port Vale	1–0	Reading	Hanley
	Smith	Report		Stadium: Old Recreation Ground; Attendance: 13,305

22 November 1947 18	Walsall	1–2	Port Vale	Walsall
		Report	Bellis; Allen	Stadium: Fellows Park; Attendance: 15,309

20 December 1947 19	Bristol Rovers	2–1	Port Vale	Bristol
		Report	Martin	Stadium: Eastville Stadium; Attendance: 11,651

25 December 1947 20	Port Vale	5–0	Brighton & Hove Albion	Hanley
	Cheadle; McGarry; Martin; Triner	Report		Stadium: Old Recreation Ground; Attendance: 11,431

27 December 1947 21	Brighton & Hove Albion	2–2	Port Vale	Hove
		Report	Cheadle; Martin	Stadium: Goldstone Ground; Attendance: 7,329

3 January 1948 22	Port Vale	1–0	Northampton Town	Hanley
	Bellis	Report		Stadium: Old Recreation Ground; Attendance: 12,905

10 January 1948 23	Port Vale	3–0	Leyton Orient	Hanley
	Keeley; Cheadle	Report		Stadium: Old Recreation Ground; Attendance: 12,225

17 January 1948 24	Aldershot	1–1	Port Vale	Aldershot
		Report	Cheadle	Stadium: Recreation Ground; Attendance: 4,459

24 January 1948 25	Port Vale	4–1	Newport County	Hanley
	Pointon; Keeley; Martin (pen.)	Report	Roffi	Stadium: Old Recreation Ground; Attendance: 10,816

31 January 1948 26	Port Vale	4–1	Crystal Palace	Hanley
	Cheadle; Allen; Pointon	Report		Stadium: Old Recreation Ground; Attendance: 13,419

7 February 1948 27	Torquay United	5–0	Port Vale	Torquay
		Report		Stadium: Plainmoor; Attendance: 6,067

14 February 1948 28	Port Vale	1–0	Swindon Town	Hanley
	Pointon 65'	Report		Stadium: Old Recreation Ground; Attendance: 14,263; Referee: F.C. Green

21 February 1948 29	Southend United	1–1	Port Vale	Southend-on-Sea
		Report	Martin	Stadium: Southend Stadium; Attendance: 3,961

28 February 1948 30	Port Vale	1–2	Notts County	Hanley
	Allen	Report		Stadium: Old Recreation Ground; Attendance: 18,147

6 March 1948 31	Swansea Town	2–0	Port Vale	Swansea
		Report		Stadium: Vetch Field; Attendance: 18,180

13 March 1948 32	Port Vale	2–1	Bournemouth & Boscombe Athletic	Hanley
	Allen; Martin	Report		Stadium: Old Recreation Ground; Attendance: 15,221

20 March 1948 33	Ipswich Town	2–1	Port Vale	Ipswich
		Report	Pointon	Stadium: Portman Road; Attendance: 11,100

26 March 1948 34	Port Vale	0–2	Queens Park Rangers	Hanley
		Report	Boxshall; Hatton	Stadium: Old Recreation Ground; Attendance: 17,889

27 March 1948 35	Port Vale	1–0	Bristol City	Hanley
	Pointon	Report		Stadium: Old Recreation Ground; Attendance: 12,541

29 March 1948 36	Queens Park Rangers	2–1	Port Vale	Shepherd's Bush, West London
	Addinall; A.Smith	Report	Pointon	Stadium: Loftus Road; Attendance: 24,053

3 April 1948 37	Reading	2–0	Port Vale	Reading, Berkshire
		Report		Stadium: Elm Park; Attendance: 12,293

7 April 1948 38	Exeter City	0–0	Port Vale	Exeter
		Report		Stadium: St James Park; Attendance: 7,653

10 April 1948 39	Port Vale	0–1	Walsall	Hanley
		Report		Stadium: Old Recreation Ground; Attendance: 12,282

17 April 1948 40	Leyton Orient	0–0	Port Vale	Leyton, East London
		Report		Stadium: Brisbane Road; Attendance: 12,430

24 April 1948 41	Port Vale	1–1	Exeter City	Hanley
	Smith	Report	Regan	Stadium: Old Recreation Ground; Attendance: 5,602; Referee: W.Prescott

1 May 1948 42	Newport County	0–0	Port Vale	Newport, Wales
		Report		Stadium: Somerton Park; Attendance: 8,309

=== FA Cup ===
29 November 1947 R1	Crystal Palace	2–1	Port Vale	Selhurst, Croydon
		Report	Smith	Stadium: Selhurst Park; Attendance: 13,000

== Squad statistics ==
=== Appearances and goals ===
Key to positions: GK – Goalkeeper; FB – Full back; HB – Half back; FW – Forward

No.	Pos	Nat	Player	Total		Third Division South		FA Cup	
No.	Pos	Nat	Player	Apps	Goals	Apps	Goals	Apps	Goals
	GK	(England) ENG	George Heppell	40	0	39	0	1	0
	FB	(England) ENG	Garth Butler	40	0	39	0	1	0
	FB	(England) ENG	Harry Hubbick	31	0	30	0	1	0
	FB	(Scotland) SCO	Bob Pursell	7	0	7	0	0	0
	HB	(England) ENG	Tommy Cheadle	23	8	23	8	0	0
	HB	(England) ENG	Eric Eastwood	19	0	18	0	1	0
	HB	(England) ENG	Norman Hallam	30	3	29	3	1	0
	HB	(England) ENG	Basil Hayward	24	0	24	0	0	0
	HB	(England) ENG	Alan Martin	43	8	42	8	1	0
	HB	(England) ENG	Bill McGarry	27	1	26	1	1	0
	HB	(England) ENG	Wilf Smith	1	0	1	0	0	0
	HB	(Ireland) EIR	Jimmy Todd	24	0	24	0	0	0
	FW	(England) ENG	Ronnie Allen	39	13	38	13	1	0
	FW	(England) ENG	John Currie	8	0	8	0	0	0
	FW	(England) ENG	Joe Dale	3	0	3	0	0	0
	FW	(England) ENG	Bill Pointon	30	10	29	10	1	0
	FW	(England) ENG	Ted Shore	3	0	3	0	0	0
	FW	(England) ENG	Jack Smith	27	10	26	9	1	1
	FW	(England) ENG	Don Triner	2	1	2	1	0	0
	FW	(England) ENG	Walter Keeley	16	3	16	3	0	0
Players who featured but departed the club during the season:
	FW	(England) ENG	Alf Bellis	18	4	17	4	1	0
	FW	(England) ENG	Morris Jones	14	3	14	3	0	0
	FW	(England) ENG	Eric Prince	3	0	3	0	0	0

=== Top scorers ===
Place	Position	Nation	Name	Third Division South	FA Cup	Total
1	FW	England	Ronnie Allen	13	0	13
2	FW	England	Bill Pointon	10	0	10
–	FW	England	Jack Smith	9	1	10
4	HB	England	Alan Martin	8	0	8
–	HB	England	Tommy Cheadle	8	0	8
6	FW	England	Alf Bellis	4	0	4
7	FW	England	Morris Jones	3	0	3
–	HB	England	Norman Hallam	3	0	3
–	FW	England	Walter Keeley	3	0	3
10	HB	England	Bill McGarry	1	0	1
–	FW	England	Don Triner	1	0	1
			TOTALS	63	1	64

== Transfers ==
=== Transfers in ===
Date from	Position	Nationality	Name	From	Fee	Ref.
June 1947	FW	ENG	Len Barber	Bury	Free transfer	
June 1947	FW	ENG	John Currie	Bournemouth and Boscombe Athletic	Free transfer	
October 1947	FB	ENG	Harry Hubbick	Bolton Wanderers	£1,000	
January 1948	FW	ENG	Walter Keeley	Bury	Exchange	
April 1948	FW	ENG	Joe Dale	Manchester United	£1,000	

=== Transfers out ===
Date from	Position	Nationality	Name	To	Fee	Ref.
November 1947	FW	ENG	Morris Jones	Swindon Town	£2,500	
January 1948	FW	ENG	Alf Bellis	Bury	'Substantial'	
February 1948	FW	ENG	Eric Prince	Macclesfield Town	Released	
Summer 1948	FW	ENG	John Currie		Released	
Summer 1948	FW	ENG	Ted Shore	Coventry City	Released	
Summer 1948	FW	ENG	Jack Smith	Congleton Town	'Free transfer	
Summer 1948	FW	ENG	Don Triner	Witton Albion	Released	
