= John Currie (footballer, born 1921) =

English footballer

Personal information
- Full name: John Edward Currie
- Date of birth: 18 March 1921
- Place of birth: Liverpool, England
- Date of death: 21 April 1984 (aged 63)
- Place of death: Bromley, England
- Position: Right winger

Senior career*
Years	Team	Apps	(Gls)
1946–1947	Bournemouth and Boscombe Athletic	7	(1)
1947	→ Stafford Rangers (loan)		
1947–1948	Port Vale	8	(0)
Total		15+	(1+)
- * Club domestic league appearances and goals

John Edward Currie (18 March 1921 – 21 April 1984) was an English footballer who played for Bournemouth and Boscombe Athletic, Stafford Rangers, and Port Vale shortly after World War II.

== Career ==
Currie scored two goals in eight Third Division South games for Harry Kinghorn's Bournemouth and Boscombe Athletic in the 1946–47 season. He also enjoyed a loan spell with Stafford Rangers before switching permanently from Dean Court to Staffordshire based Port Vale in June 1947. He only managed nine Third Division South appearances in the 1947–48 season and was released from the Old Recreation Ground in the summer by manager Gordon Hodgson.

== Career statistics ==
Appearances and goals by club, season and competition
Club	Season	League			FA Cup		Total	
Club	Season	Division	Apps	Goals	Apps	Goals	Apps	Goals
Bournemouth and Boscombe Athletic	1946–47	Third Division South	7	1	0	0	0	0
Port Vale	1947–48	Third Division South	8	0	0	0	8	0
