= Billy Byrne (footballer) =

English footballer

Personal information
- Full name: William Byrne
- Date of birth: 22 October 1918
- Place of birth: Newcastle-under-Lyme, England
- Date of death: 2001 (aged 82–83)
- Position: Forward

Senior career*
Years	Team	Apps	(Gls)
1946–1947	Port Vale	15	(2)
1947–1949	Crewe Alexandra	17	(1)
- Stafford Rangers
Total		32+	(3+)
- * Club domestic league appearances and goals

William Byrne (22 October 1918 – 2001) was an English footballer.

== Career ==
Byrne joined Port Vale as an amateur in March 1946 and, after making his debut in a War Cup match in April that year, signed as a professional the next month. He played 15 league and one FA Cup game in the 1946–47 season, but only scored two goals in wins over Mansfield Town and Notts County in the Third Division South. He left the Old Recreation Ground in July 1947, when manager Gordon Hodgson transferred him to nearby Crewe Alexandra of the Third Division North. He scored one goal in 18 appearances for the "Railwaymen" in 1947–48 and 1948–49 under Frank Hill and then Arthur Turner. He later played for non-League club Stafford Rangers.

== Career statistics ==
Appearances and goals by club, season and competition
Club	Season	League			FA Cup		Total	
Club	Season	Division	Apps	Goals	Apps	Goals	Apps	Goals
Port Vale	1946–47	Third Division South	15	2	1	0	16	2
Crewe Alexandra	1947–48	Third Division North	16	1	1	0	17	1
Crewe Alexandra	1948–49	Third Division North	1	0	0	0	1	0
Crewe Alexandra	Total		32	3	2	0	34	3
