= Ernie Willett =

English footballer

Ernest Willett
Personal information
- Full name: Ernie Willett
- Date of birth: 27 July 1919
- Place of birth: Burslem, England
- Date of death: 13 February 1985 (aged 65)
- Place of death: Hartshill, Stoke-on-Trent, England
- Position: Half-back

Youth career
- Stoke City
- Port Vale

Senior career*
Years	Team	Apps	(Gls)
1940–1947	Port Vale	1	(0)
1947–1949	Witton Albion		
- * Club domestic league appearances and goals

Ernest Willett (27 July 1919 – 13 February 1985) was an English footballer who played one game for Port Vale in the English Football League in October 1946.

== Career ==
Willett graduated through the Port Vale youth team to sign as a professional in January 1940. He made his debut at the Old Recreation Ground against Macclesfield Town in a war cup match on 13 April 1946; the match finished goalless. His second game was in the English Football League Third Division South on 5 October 1946, in a 3–0 loss to Bournemouth & Boscombe Athletic at Dean Court. He was not selected again in the 1946–47 season. He was instead transferred to Cheshire County League side Witton Albion in March 1947. He scored one goal in twelve games in what remained of the 1946–47 season, appeared 45 times in the 1947–48 campaign and scored one goal from five games in the 1948–49 season.

== Career statistics ==
Appearances and goals by club, season and competition
Club	Season	League			FA Cup		Total	
Club	Season	Division	Apps	Goals	Apps	Goals	Apps	Goals
Port Vale	1946–47	Third Division South	1	0	0	0	1	0
Witton Albion	1946–47	Cheshire County League					12	1
Witton Albion	1947–48	Cheshire County League					45	0
Witton Albion	1948–49	Cheshire County League					5	1
Witton Albion	Total						62	2
