= Ted Oldfield =

English footballer

Personal information
- Full name: John Edward Oldfield
- Date of birth: 13 July 1918
- Place of birth: Helsby, England
- Date of death: 2006 (aged 87–88)
- Position: Right-half

Youth career
- Helsby

Senior career*
Years	Team	Apps	(Gls)
1945–1947	Port Vale	1	(0)
Total		1	(0)
- * Club domestic league appearances and goals

John Edward Oldfield (13 July 1918 – 2006) was an English footballer who played at right-half for Port Vale shortly after World War II.

== Career ==
Oldfield played for Helsby before joining Port Vale as an amateur in December 1945. He became a regular in the war leagues, and signed as a professional in February 1946. He guested for Vale's opponents on 20 April 1946, when Southend United lost 2–1 at the Old Recreation Ground. Oldfield then played for Vale in the reverse fixture two days later – which finished 1–1. He lost his place as the war ended and so only played one Third Division South game in the Football League, before being released by manager Gordon Hodgson at the end of the 1946–47 season.

== Career statistics ==
Appearances and goals by club, season and competition
Club	Season	League			FA Cup		Total	
Club	Season	Division	Apps	Goals	Apps	Goals	Apps	Goals
Port Vale	1945–46	–	0	0	2	0	2	0
Port Vale	1946–47	Third Division South	1	0	0	0	1	0
Port Vale	Total		1	0	2	0	3	0
