= Harry Prince =

English footballer

Personal information
- Full name: Harold Prince
- Date of birth: 4 December 1921
- Place of birth: Stoke-on-Trent, England
- Date of death: 2009 (aged 87–88)
- Position: Goalkeeper

Youth career
- Bucknall
- Port Vale

Senior career*
Years	Team	Apps	(Gls)
1941–1943	Port Vale	0	(0)
1943–1944	Wolverhampton Wanderers	0	(0)
1944–1949	Port Vale	5	(0)
- Stafford Rangers
Total		5+	(0+)
- * Club domestic league appearances and goals

Harold Prince (4 December 1921 – 2009) was an English footballer who played as a goalkeeper for Port Vale, Wolverhampton Wanderers, and Stafford Rangers.

== Career ==
Prince played for Bucknall, before graduating through the Port Vale youth side to sign professional forms with the Vale in September 1941. With World War II raging, he transferred to Wolverhampton Wanderers in July 1943 without having played a game for the "Valiants". He returned to the Old Recreation Ground in August 1944, making his debut in a 3–0 home win over Birmingham City in a Football League North match on 26 August 1944. He became the first choice stopper until stubbing a foot whilst taking a goal kick in a 2–1 defeat by Crewe Alexandra at Gresty Road on 30 December 1944. In a display of poor sportsmanship, Crewe went ahead and scored as Prince lay injured on the ground. He recovered, but lost his first-team spot in October 1945, at which point he was used as understudy to George Heppell. In one rare appearance, on 18 April 1949, in a 1–1 draw with Bristol City at Ashton Gate, he managed to concede a 40 yards (37 m) 'punt' that sailed over his head. It was most probably a major factor in the decision to release him from his contract later that month. He had played fifty competitive games for the club, a good amount of experience to take into the non-leagues with Stafford Rangers.

== Career statistics ==
Appearances and goals by club, season and competition
Club	Season	League			FA Cup		Total	
Club	Season	Division	Apps	Goals	Apps	Goals	Apps	Goals
Port Vale	1947–48	Third Division South	3	0	0	0	3	0
Port Vale	1948–49	Third Division South	2	0	0	0	2	0
Port Vale	Total		5	0	0	0	5	0
