= Bob Pursell =

Bob Pursell may refer to:

- Bob Pursell (footballer born 1889) (1889–1974), Scottish footballer who played for Liverpool and Port Vale
- Bob Pursell (footballer born 1919), Scottish footballer who played for Wolverhampton Wanderers and Port Vale
