= Jack Chew =

English footballer

Personal information
- Full name: John Chew
- Date of birth: 25 November 1915
- Place of birth: Longton, Stoke-on-Trent, England
- Date of death: 5 April 1984 (aged 68)
- Place of death: Stoke-on-Trent, England
- Position: Left-back

Youth career
- Luton Town

Senior career*
Years	Team	Apps	(Gls)
1946–1947	Port Vale	9	(0)
Total		9	(0)
- * Club domestic league appearances and goals

John Chew (25 November 1915 – 5 April 1984) was an English footballer who played at full-back for Luton Town and Port Vale shortly after World War II.

== Career ==
Chew played for Luton Town before joining Port Vale in March 1946. He made his debut at the Old Recreation Ground in a 4–1 win over Notts County on 23 September, but only had two short spells in the first-team, finishing with nine Third Division South and three FA Cup appearances before being released by manager Gordon Hodgson at the end of the season.

== Career statistics ==
Appearances and goals by club, season and competition
Club	Season	League			FA Cup		Total	
Club	Season	Division	Apps	Goals	Apps	Goals	Apps	Goals
Port Vale	1946–47	Third Division South	9	0	3	0	12	0
Career total			9	0	3	0	12	0
