= Joseph Dickson (disambiguation) =

Joseph Dickson was a U.S. politician.

Joseph Dickson may also refer to:

- Joe Dickson (1940–2022), Canadian politician
- Joe Dickson (footballer) (1934–1990), English footballer
- Joseph Dickson (sport shooter), member of the winning 1985 ISSF Olympic skeet men team
- Joseph Z. Dickson, co-founder of Dickson Prize

== See also ==
- Joseph Dixon (disambiguation)
