= Bill Pointon =

English footballer

Billy Pointon
Personal information
- Full name: William James Pointon
- Date of birth: 25 November 1920
- Place of birth: Hanley, England
- Date of death: 6 January 2008 (aged 87)
- Place of death: Portsmouth, England
- Position: Forward

Senior career*
| Years | Team | Apps | (Gls) |
| 1941–1949 | Port Vale | 74 | (26) |
| 1949–1950 | Queens Park Rangers | 26 | (6) |
| 1950–1951 | Brentford | 16 | (2) |
- Leek Town
| Total | | 116+ | (34+) |
- * Club domestic league appearances and goals

William James Pointon (25 November 1920 – 6 January 2008) was an English footballer who played as a forward for Port Vale, Queens Park Rangers, Brentford, and Leek Town.

== Career ==
Pointon joined Port Vale as a wartime player in February 1941. Due to World War II, his debut did not come until 16 September 1944; in the meantime he guested for Portsmouth, Stoke City (5 goals in 10 games) and Brighton & Hove Albion. With 19 strikes in the 1945–46 season he finished as the club's top scorer. He hit 14 goals in 35 appearances for Gordon Hodgson's "Valiants" in 1946–47. He hit 10 goals in 30 games in 1947–48 – his last full season at the Old Recreation Ground. He scored five goals in 15 Third Division South games in 1948–49. After 119 appearances (74 in the Football League) and 53 goals (26 in the Football League), Pointon was sold to Dave Mangnall's Queens Park Rangers for a then-club record five-figure fee in January 1949. He scored six goals in 26 Second Division appearances in 1948–49 and 1949–50. Point then left Loftus Road and moved on to league rivals Brentford. He scored two goals in 16 appearances for the "Bees" in 1950–51, helping Jackie Gibbons's side to a ninth-place finish. After leaving Griffin Park, he later turned out for non-League Leek Town.

== Post-retirement ==
In retirement he took charge of the Portsmouth's "A" side.

== Career statistics ==
Appearances and goals by club, season and competition
| Club | Season | League | | | FA Cup | | Total | |
| Club | Season | Division | Apps | Goals | Apps | Goals | Apps | Goals |
|---|---|---|---|---|---|---|---|---|
| Port Vale | 1945–46 | | 0 | 0 | 5 | 1 | 5 | 1 |
| Port Vale | 1946–47 | Third Division South | 30 | 11 | 5 | 3 | 35 | 14 |
| Port Vale | 1947–48 | Third Division South | 29 | 10 | 1 | 0 | 30 | 10 |
| Port Vale | 1948–49 | Third Division South | 15 | 5 | 0 | 0 | 15 | 5 |
| Port Vale | Total | | 74 | 26 | 11 | 4 | 85 | 30 |
| Queens Park Rangers | 1948–49 | Second Division | 17 | 4 | 0 | 0 | 17 | 4 |
| Queens Park Rangers | 1949–50 | Second Division | 9 | 2 | 0 | 0 | 9 | 2 |
| Queens Park Rangers | Total | | 26 | 6 | 0 | 0 | 26 | 6 |
| Brentford | 1949–50 | Second Division | 12 | 2 | 0 | 0 | 12 | 2 |
| Brentford | 1950–51 | Second Division | 4 | 0 | 0 | 0 | 4 | 0 |
| Brentford | Total | | 16 | 2 | 0 | 0 | 16 | 2 |
| Career total | | | 116 | 34 | 11 | 4 | 127 | 38 |
