= Eric Eastwood (footballer) =

English footballer

Personal information
- Full name: Eric Eastwood
- Date of birth: 24 March 1916
- Place of birth: Heywood, Greater Manchester, England
- Date of death: October 1991 (age 75)
- Place of death: Bolton, England
- Height: 5 ft 8 1/2 in (1.74 m)
- Position: Centre-half

Youth career
- Chorley Road Congregationals
- Little Lever
- Westhoughton
- Heywood St. James's

Senior career*
Years	Team	Apps	(Gls)
1938–1947	Manchester City	16	(0)
1947–1950	Port Vale	28	(1)
Total		44	(1)
- * Club domestic league appearances and goals

Eric Eastwood (24 March 1916 – October 1991) was an English footballer who played for Manchester City and Port Vale in the Football League in the period following World War II.

== Career ==
Eastwood played for local non-League teams Chorley Road Congregationals, Little Lever, Westhoughton and Heywood St. James's, before joining Manchester City. After spells guesting for Bolton Wanderers and Manchester United during the war, he signed to Port Vale from Manchester City for a four-figure fee in March 1947. He scored his first goal in the Football League on 26 April, in a 2–1 win over Bristol Rovers at the Old Recreation Ground, and went on to play six Third Division South games in the 1946–47 season. He featured in 19 league and FA Cup games in the 1947–48 season, but was transfer listed by manager Gordon Hodgson as he appeared just four times in the 1948–49 campaign. He suffered from groin muscle problems and left on a free transfer in April 1950 after failing to make it onto the pitch in the 1949–50 season.

== Career statistics ==
Appearances and goals by club, season and competition
Club	Season	League			FA Cup		Total	
Club	Season	Division	Apps	Goals	Apps	Goals	Apps	Goals
Manchester City	1938–39	Second Division	7	0	0	0	7	0
Manchester City	1946–47	Second Division	9	0	0	0	9	0
Manchester City	Total		16	0	0	0	16	0
Port Vale	1946–47	Third Division South	6	1	0	0	6	1
Port Vale	1947–48	Third Division South	18	0	1	0	19	0
Port Vale	1948–49	Third Division South	4	0	0	0	4	0
Port Vale	1949–50	Third Division South	0	0	0	0	0	0
Port Vale	Total		28	1	1	0	29	1
Career total			44	1	1	0	45	1
