= Eric Prince =

English footballer

Personal information
- Date of birth: 11 December 1924
- Place of birth: Ipstones, England
- Date of death: 2003 (aged 78–79)
- Position: Centre-forward

Youth career
- Ipstones

Senior career*
Years	Team	Apps	(Gls)
1944–1948	Port Vale	17	(2)
1948–1949	Macclesfield Town	1	(0)
Total		19	(2)
- * Club domestic league appearances and goals

Eric Prince (11 December 1924 – 2003) was an English footballer who played in the Football League for Port Vale in the mid-1940s.

== Career ==
Prince played for Ipstones, the local village club, before joining Port Vale in September 1944. He scored on his debut: a 2–1 defeat by West Bromwich Albion at The Hawthorns in a Football League North match on 9 September. He was a regular for the "Valiants" during the war years, but also guested for Crewe Alexandra in March 1945. He scored twice in 18 games during the 1946–47 season, scoring against Aldershot and Brighton & Hove Albion at the Old Recreation Ground in late December. He featured in just three Third Division South matches in 1947–48 before he was released by manager Gordon Hodgson in February 1948. He moved on to Macclesfield Town and later turned out for Simplex Creda.

== Career statistics ==
Appearances and goals by club, season and competition
Club	Season	League			FA Cup		Total	
Club	Season	Division	Apps	Goals	Apps	Goals	Apps	Goals
Port Vale	1946–47	Third Division South	14	2	4	0	18	2
Port Vale	1947–48	Third Division South	3	0	0	0	3	0
Port Vale	Total		17	2	4	0	21	2
Macclesfield Town	1948–49	Cheshire County League	1	0	1	0	2	0
