= Colin Lyman =

English footballer (1914-1986)

Personal information
- Full name: Colin Chad Lyman
- Date of birth: 9 March 1914
- Place of birth: Northampton, England
- Date of death: 9 May 1986 (aged 72)
- Place of death: Cambridge, England
- Height: 5 ft 8 in (1.73 m)
- Position: Forward

Youth career
- Rushden Town
- West Bromwich Albion

Senior career*
| Years | Team | Apps | (Gls) |
| 1933 | Southend United | 1 | (0) |
| 1935–1937 | Northampton Town | 85 | (29) |
| 1937–1945 | Tottenham Hotspur | 46 | (10) |
| 1946 | Port Vale | 11 | (1) |
| 1946–1947 | Nottingham Forest | 23 | (9) |
| 1947–1948 | Notts County | 21 | (5) |
| 1948–1950 | Nuneaton Borough | 37 | (21) |
- Long Eaton Town
- British Timken
| Total | | 224 | (75) |

Managerial career
- 1948–1950: Nuneaton Borough (player-manager)
- Long Eaton Town
- * Club domestic league appearances and goals

Colin Chad Lyman (9 March 1914 – 9 May 1986) was an English footballer who played as a forward. He scored 54 goals in 188 league games in the Football League playing for West Bromwich Albion, Southend United, Northampton Town, Tottenham Hotspur, Port Vale, Nottingham Forest, and Notts County. He went on to serve Nuneaton Borough as player-manager from August 1948 to December 1950.

== Playing career ==
Lyman played for Rushden Town and West Bromwich Albion before playing one Third Division South game at Roots Hall for Southend United in 1933. He moved on to league rivals Northampton Town, turning professional at the club in 1935. He scored 29 goals in 86 league games at the County Ground in 1934–35, 1935–36, and 1936–37. He then moved up to the Second Division with Tottenham Hotspur for a £3,000 fee. He spent the 1937–38 and 1938–39 seasons at White Hart Lane, and scored 11 goals in 54 league and cup matches. He also guested for Partick Thistle, Leicester City, Notts County, Chesterfield, Derby County, Coventry City and Port Vale during World War II. Having played four games for the Vale as a guest in 1946, he signed permanently for the club in May 1946 for a 'fairly substantial fee'. He played 11 Third Division South games for the club in 1946–47, scoring at the Old Recreation Ground in a 1–1 draw with Northampton Town. After putting in a transfer request, he was sold to Nottingham Forest in October 1946 for a 'substantial sum' above what the Vale had paid for him. He scored nine goals in 23 Second Division appearances for Billy Walker's Forest in the rest of the 1946–47 season. After leaving the City Ground, he moved on to rivals Notts County. He scored five goals in 21 Third Division South games for the "Magpies" in 1947–48 before leaving Meadow Lane.

== Management career ==
Lyman was appointed as player-manager at Birmingham Combination club Nuneaton Borough on 2 August 1948. He brought 24-year-old Walsall forward Jimmy Campbell, as well as Arsenal inside-forward David Metzger and Notts County goalkeeper Harold Orgill. He led the club to lift the Birmingham Senior Cup and a second-place league finish to Bedworth Town, with Lyman contributing 18 goals from 35 games. He strengthened the squad by signing 23-year-old outside-left Alan Daley from Mansfield Town. They finished third in the 1949–50 season and reached the third round of the FA Cup for the first time in the club's history, beating Bedworth Town, Moira United, Atherstone Town, Gresley Rovers, Wellington Town, King's Lynn and Mossley, before they were eliminated by Exeter City. Speaking at the end of season dinner he declared that: "I know my directors are keen to see first-class football in Nuneaton the same as myself, but there is a long way to go yet. There are other clubs with the same idea, but if we get the support, I think in a few years first class football will be seen in Nuneaton." In an attempt to overcome champions Bedworth Town, he signed their inside-left Jim McKeown, who was regarded as one of the division's finest players. He also brought in Ralph Dulson at inside-right, who had helped Linby Colliery to the Central Alliance title. The front three was completed with the arrival of Latvia international Eddie Freimanis from Northampton Town. Lyman resigned in December 1950 to take up another job. He went on to serve Long Eaton Town as player-manager and played for British Timken.

== Career statistics ==
Appearances and goals by club, season and competition
| Club | Season | League | | | Cup | | Total | |
| Club | Season | Division | Apps | Goals | Apps | Goals | Apps | Goals |
|---|---|---|---|---|---|---|---|---|
| Southend United | 1933–34 | Third Division South | 1 | 0 | 0 | 0 | 1 | 0 |
| Northampton Town | 1934–35 | Third Division South | 17 | 8 | 0 | 0 | 17 | 8 |
| Northampton Town | 1935–36 | Third Division South | 29 | 8 | 1 | 0 | 30 | 8 |
| Northampton Town | 1936–37 | Third Division South | 30 | 11 | 1 | 0 | 31 | 11 |
| Northampton Town | 1937–38 | Third Division South | 9 | 2 | 0 | 0 | 9 | 2 |
| Northampton Town | Total | | 85 | 29 | 2 | 0 | 87 | 29 |
| Tottenham Hotspur | 1937–38 | Second Division | 24 | 4 | 4 | 1 | 28 | 5 |
| Tottenham Hotspur | 1938–39 | Second Division | 22 | 6 | 2 | 0 | 24 | 6 |
| Tottenham Hotspur | 1945–46 | | 0 | 0 | 2 | 0 | 2 | 0 |
| Tottenham Hotspur | Total | | 46 | 10 | 8 | 1 | 54 | 11 |
| Port Vale | 1946–47 | Third Division South | 11 | 1 | 0 | 0 | 11 | 1 |
| Nottingham Forest | 1945–46 | Second Division | 23 | 9 | 4 | 1 | 27 | 10 |
| Notts County | 1947–48 | Third Division South | 21 | 5 | 0 | 0 | 21 | 5 |
| Nuneaton Borough | 1948–49 | Birmingham Combination | 26 | 15 | 9 | 3 | 35 | 18 |
| Nuneaton Borough | 1949–50 | Birmingham Combination | 9 | 5 | 1 | 1 | 10 | 6 |
| Nuneaton Borough | 1950–51 | Birmingham Combination | 2 | 1 | 0 | 0 | 2 | 1 |
| Nuneaton Borough | Total | | 37 | 21 | 10 | 4 | 47 | 25 |
| Career total | | | 224 | 75 | 24 | 6 | 248 | 81 |

== Honours ==
Nuneaton Borough

- Birmingham Senior Cup: 1949
