= Joe Dale =

English footballer (1921–2000)

Personal information
- Full name: Joseph Dale
- Date of birth: 3 July 1921
- Place of birth: Northwich, England
- Date of death: 11 September 2000 (aged 79)
- Position: Outside right

Senior career*
Years	Team	Apps	(Gls)
1940–1947	Witton Albion		
1947–1948	Manchester United	2	(0)
1948	Port Vale	9	(1)
1948–1958	Witton Albion		
- * Club domestic league appearances and goals

Joseph Dale (3 July 1921 – 11 September 2000) was an English footballer who played in the English Football League for Manchester United and Port Vale, as well as playing for Witton Albion in three Cheshire County League winning seasons (1948–49, 1949–50 and 1953–54).

== Career ==
Dale debuted for Witton Albion on 20 April 1940 and scored one goal in five games in the 1939–40 season. He scored 22 goals in 39 games in the 1946–47 season. He transferred to Manchester United in June 1947. He made his United debut on 27 September 1947 in a 2–1 win at Preston North End. He only played one further game before he was bought by Port Vale for 'a substantial fee' (£1,000) in April 1948. He made his debut in a 1–0 home defeat by Walsall on 10 April 1948 but again failed to win a first-team spot. He scored one goal in his next eight appearances before old club Witton Albion put in a then-Cheshire League record fee to bring him back to the club in October 1948. He scored 21 goals in 33 games in the 1948–49 Cheshire County League title-winning season, 20 goals in 37 games in the 1949–50 Cheshire County League title-winning season, 15 goals in 33 games in the 1950–51 season, 8 goals in 25 games in the 1951–52 season, 17 goals in 44 games in the 1952–53 season, 24 goals in 48 games in the 1953–54 Cheshire County League title-winning season, 8 goals in 24 games in the 1954–55 season, 14 goals in 21 games in the 1955–56 season, 12 goals in 28 games in the 1956–57 season, 6 goals in 18 games in the 1957–58 season and made one final appearance in the 1958–59 campaign.

== Career statistics ==
Appearances and goals by club, season and competition
Club	Season	League			FA Cup		Other		Total	
Club	Season	Division	Apps	Goals	Apps	Goals	Apps	Goals	Apps	Goals
Witton Albion	1939–40	Cheshire County League							5	1
Witton Albion	1946–47	Cheshire County League							39	22
Witton Albion	Total								44	23
Manchester United	1947–48	First Division	2	0	0	0	—		2	0
Port Vale	1947–48	Third Division South	3	0	0	0	—		3	0
Port Vale	1948–49	Third Division South	6	1	0	0	—		6	1
Port Vale	Total		9	1	0	0	0	0	9	1
Witton Albion	1948–49	Cheshire County League							33	21
Witton Albion	1949–50	Cheshire County League							37	20
Witton Albion	1950–51	Cheshire County League							33	15
Witton Albion	1951–52	Cheshire County League							25	8
Witton Albion	1952–53	Cheshire County League							44	17
Witton Albion	1953–54	Cheshire County League							48	24
Witton Albion	1954–55	Cheshire County League							24	8
Witton Albion	1955–56	Cheshire County League							21	14
Witton Albion	1956–57	Cheshire County League							28	12
Witton Albion	1957–58	Cheshire County League							18	6
Witton Albion	1958–59	Cheshire County League							1	0
Witton Albion	Total								312	145

== Honours ==
Witton Albion

- Cheshire County League: 1948–49, 1949–50, 1953–54
