= Billy Frith =

English footballer (1912–1996)

Personal information
- Full name: William Frith
- Date of birth: 9 June 1912
- Place of birth: Sheffield, England
- Date of death: 1996 (aged 83–84)
- Height: 5 ft 8 1/2 in (1.74 m)
- Position: Wing half

Senior career*
Years	Team	Apps	(Gls)
1930	Worksop Town		
1931	Mansfield Town		
1931–1932	Chesterfield	9	(3)
1932–1939	Coventry City	162	(4)
1945–1946	Port Vale	0	(0)
1946–1947	Coventry City	7	(0)

Managerial career
- 1945–1946: Port Vale
- 1947–1948: Coventry City
- 1948–1950: Stafford Rangers
- Rugby Town
- 1957–1961: Coventry City
- 1963–1965: Chelmsford City
- * Club domestic league appearances and goals

William Frith (9 June 1912 – 1996) was an English football player and manager.

Starting his career with Worksop Town, Mansfield Town, and Chesterfield, he won a move to Coventry City in 1932. He stayed with the club right up until the outbreak of World War II, helping the club to finish 1935–36 as Third Division South champions, and played a total of 165 games for the club in the Football League.

In 1945, he was appointed as manager of Port Vale before returning to Coventry as manager in 1947. His time at both clubs was unsuccessful, and he spent the next decade in non-League football as manager of Stafford Rangers and Rugby Town. He returned to Coventry as manager in 1957 and led the club to promotion out of the Fourth Division in 1958–59, but was sacked in 1961. His last management post was at Chelmsford City between 1963 and 1965; he led the club to second in the Southern League in 1963–64.

== Playing career ==
Frith played as a wing half for non-League sides Worksop Town and Mansfield Town. He transferred to Second Division side Chesterfield in 1931, and scored on his debut in the Football League on 19 September, in a 3–2 win over Bradford (Park Avenue). He scored a total of three goals in nine league games before he moved on to Coventry City later in the year. He remained in Harry Storer's team up until the outbreak of World War II. During this time, Coventry finished second in the Third Division South in 1933–34, though were not promoted. They did achieve promotion at the end of the 1935–36 campaign after topping the division, one point ahead of chasers Luton Town. Coventry finished in fourth place in the Second Division in the two pre-war seasons, missing out on promotion to the First Division by one point in 1937–38 and four points in 1938–39. Frith made 172 League appearances for Coventry City in two spells.

== Managerial career ==
=== Port Vale ===
Frith was appointed manager of Port Vale in August 1945. The 1945–46 season was uneventful, and he seemed to settle into management quite well. In preparation for the first season of post-war football, he signed experienced forward Colin Lyman from Tottenham Hotspur for a 'fairly substantial fee', full-back Garth Butler from Derby County, and half-back Norman Hallam from Chelsea. He sold goalkeeper Arthur Jepson to Stoke City for £3,750. However, after a poor start to the season, he resigned in October 1946 over a policy difference with the club's directors. He claimed the board refused to back his suggestions for new players, interfered in team selection and failed to grant him a three-year contract – claims the club denied. The "Valiants" went on to finish the 1946–47 campaign in tenth place in the Third Division South under Gordon Hodgson.

=== Coventry City ===
After leaving Port Vale, Frith returned to Highfield Road as assistant to Dick Bayliss and also played seven league games. Following Bayliss' death, Frith was appointed manager of Coventry City in August 1947, remaining in that position until November 1948. He signed goalkeeper Reg Matthews but was sacked with the club in the bottom two. Coventry finished the 1947–48 Second Division season in tenth place, and went on to end the 1948–49 season just two points above the relegation zone under Harry Storer's stewardship.

Following spells in charge at non-league clubs Stafford Rangers and Rugby Town, he rejoined Coventry City as a coach. He was once again appointed manager in September 1957. His side ended 1957–58 in 19th place in the Third Division South, and so were invited to become founder members of the Fourth Division in 1958–59. He then took the club to a second-place finish in 1958–59, four points behind champions Port Vale, his former club; City were therefore promoted into the Third Division.

His side flirted with the prospect of a second successive promotion in 1959–60 but ultimately finished in fifth place. They failed to push for promotion in 1960–61, and ended the campaign in 15th place. On what was known as 'Black Saturday', 25 November 1961, Coventry were dumped out of the FA Cup by non-league King's Lynn. Frith was sacked by chairman Derrick Robins. He was replaced by Jimmy Hill, who took Coventry to a 14th-place finish in 1961–62. He later managed Chelmsford City. He led the "Clarets" to second and fifth-place finishes in the Southern League in 1963–64 and 1964–65. He later worked as a teacher until retiring in 1977.

== Career statistics ==
=== Playing statistics ===
Appearances and goals by club, season and competition
Club	Season	League			FA Cup		Other^{[A]}		Total	
Club	Season	Division	Apps	Goals	Apps	Goals	Apps	Goals	Apps	Goals
Chesterfield	1931–32	Second Division	9	3	0	0	0	0	9	3
Coventry City	1932–33	Third Division South	3	1	0	0	0	0	3	1
Coventry City	1933–34	Third Division South	8	0	0	0	1	1	9	1
Coventry City	1934–35	Third Division South	22	0	1	0	4	0	27	0
Coventry City	1935–36	Third Division South	30	2	2	0	2	1	34	3
Coventry City	1936–37	Second Division	28	1	3	0	0	0	31	1
Coventry City	1937–38	Second Division	32	0	0	0	0	0	32	0
Coventry City	1938–39	Second Division	39	0	1	0	0	0	40	0
Coventry City	1939–40	Second Division	0	0	0	0	3	0	3	0
Coventry City	1946–47	Second Division	7	0	1	0	0	0	8	0
Coventry City	Total		169	4	8	0	10	2	187	6
Port Vale	1946–47	Third Division South	0	0	0	0	0	0	0	0
Career total			178	7	8	0	10	2	196	9

=== Managerial statistics ===
Managerial record by team and tenure
Team	From	To	Record				
Team	From	To	P	W	D	L	Win %
Port Vale	1 August 1945	1 October 1946	13	5	5	3	38.5
Coventry City	1 February 1947	29 November 1948	85	27	23	35	31.8
Coventry City	25 September 1957	29 November 1961	204	84	49	71	41.2
Total			302	116	77	109	38.4

== Honours ==
Coventry City

- Football League Third Division South: 1935–36
- Football League Fourth Division second-place promotion: 1958–59
