= Ron Mawson =

English footballer

Personal information
- Full name: Ronald Mawson
- Date of birth: 16 September 1914
- Place of birth: Bishop Auckland, England
- Date of death: 1981 (aged 66–67)
- Place of death: Coventry, England
- Height: 6 ft 1 in (1.85 m)
- Position: Goalkeeper

Youth career
- RAF Ternhill

Senior career*
Years	Team	Apps	(Gls)
1946–1948	Crewe Alexandra	23	(0)
1948–1949	Wrexham	6	(0)
Total		29	(0)
- * Club domestic league appearances and goals

Ronald Mawson (16 September 1914 – 1981) was an English football goalkeeper who played for Crewe Alexandra and Wrexham in the late 1940s.

== Career ==
Mawson played for RAF Ternhill during the war and also guested for Port Vale in 1945. He was still a young man at the war's end and so signed with Frank Hill's Crewe Alexandra in 1946. He made 23 Third Division North appearances for the "Railwaymen" in 1946–47 and 1947–48. He left Gresty Road, and moved on to Wrexham in 1948, but made only six appearances at Racecourse Ground in the 1948–49 campaign.

== Career statistics ==
Appearances and goals by club, season and competition
Club	Season	League			FA Cup		Total	
Club	Season	Division	Apps	Goals	Apps	Goals	Apps	Goals
Crewe Alexandra	1945–46		0	0	1	0	1	0
Crewe Alexandra	1946–47	Third Division North	22	0	1	0	23	0
Crewe Alexandra	1947–48	Third Division North	1	0	0	0	1	0
Crewe Alexandra	Total		23	0	2	0	25	0
Wrexham	1948–49	Third Division North	6	0	1	0	7	0
Career total			29	0	3	0	32	0
