= Guido Roffi =

Welsh footballer

Personal information
- Full name: Guido Tomaso Angelo Roffi
- Date of birth: 6 March 1924
- Place of birth: Matthewstown, Wales
- Date of death: 27 February 1973 (aged 48)
- Position: Inside forward

Youth career
- Tynte Rovers

Senior career*
Years	Team	Apps	(Gls)
1947–1951	Newport County	112	(27)
- * Club domestic league appearances and goals

Guido Tomaso Angelo Roffi (6 March 1924 – 27 February 1973) was a Welsh professional footballer. An inside-forward, he joined Newport County in 1947 from Tynte Rovers. He went on to make 112 Football League appearances for Newport, scoring 27 goals between 1947 and 1951.

In 1950, Roffi scored four goals (all with his head) during a match in which Newport beat Aldershot 7–0.

Roffi was ineligible to represent Wales due to his Italian roots. His parents had previously traveled to Wales from Lombardy, Italy.

Roffi died at the age of 48 after suffering with illness. To mark his passing, the 'Roffi Cup' was set up in his memory, a football tournament in which Cynon Valley junior schools compete.
