= Alf Bellis =

English footballer

Personal information
- Full name: Alfred Bellis
- Date of birth: 8 October 1920
- Place of birth: Liverpool, England
- Date of death: 28 April 2013 (aged 92)
- Height: 5 ft 8 1/2 in (1.74 m)
- Position: Outside left

Youth career
- Shell Juniors
- Burnell's Ironworks

Senior career*
Years	Team	Apps	(Gls)
1938–1948	Port Vale	82	(18)
1948–1951	Bury	95	(18)
1951–1953	Swansea Town	41	(11)
1953–1954	Chesterfield	13	(3)
- Rhyl Athletic
- Colwyn Bay
- Penmaenmawr
- * Club domestic league appearances and goals

Alfred Bellis (8 October 1920 – 28 April 2013) was an English footballer who played at outside left in the Football League for Port Vale, Bury, Swansea Town, and Chesterfield. He also played for Ellesmere Port Town, Rochdale, Notts County, Manchester United and Manchester City during World War II.

== Career ==
Bellis was working as a laboratory assistant at Shell when he was spotted playing for the works team. He joined Port Vale from Burnell's Ironworks in March 1938, and was sacked by Shell after choosing to play for Vale ahead of the company. He scored on his debut on 30 April 1938, in a 4–1 win over Rochdale at the Old Recreation Ground, in what was the last home game of the 1937–38 campaign. He scored three goals in 31 appearances in 1938–39. During the war he played for the "Valiants", as well as guesting for Ellesmere Port Town, Rochdale, Notts County, Manchester United and Manchester City. He was particularly active for Manchester United in the 1942–43 and 1943–44 seasons. On 9 October 1943, he scored a hat-trick for the "Red Devils" in a 3–1 win over Chester. For his wartime duties, he loaded bombs onto planes.

He was the Vale's top-scorer for the 1944–45 season with 10 goals and, despite also guesting for Luton Town, was a regular in the side. He scored 12 goals in 43 games in 1946–47, as the Football League Third Division South continued following an eight-season break. He hit four goals in 18 games in 1947–48, before he was traded to Bury in exchange for Walter Keeley and a 'substantial fee' in January 1948 by manager Gordon Hodgson. He played 158 games (84 in the Football League). He scored 46 goals (18 in the football league).

At the end of the 1947–48 season, Norman Bullock's "Shakers" avoided relegation out of the Second Division by one place and five points. They reached 12th in the league in 1948–49 and then finished 18th in 1949–50 before avoiding the drop by one place and two points in 1950–51 under the stewardship of John McNeill. After 95 league games, Bellis then left Gigg Lane and switched to league rivals Swansea Town, who posted 19th and 11th-place finishes in 1951–52 and 1952–53 under the stewardship of Billy McCandless. He left the "Swans" after two years at Vetch Field and played for Chesterfield in the 1953–54 campaign, helping them to finish sixth in the Third Division North. He featured in just 13 league games for Teddy Davison's "Spireites" and departed Saltergate for stays with Welsh non-League sides Rhyl Athletic, Colwyn Bay and Penmaenmawr. He later worked in a factory.

== Personal life ==
He married Ellen and had three daughters: Ann Ridell, Kate Meere and Norma J Bellis.

== Career statistics ==
Appearances and goals by club, season and competition
Club	Season	League			FA Cup		Other		Total	
Club	Season	Division	Apps	Goals	Apps	Goals	Apps	Goals	Apps	Goals
Port Vale	1937–38	Third Division North	1	1	0	0	0	0	1	1
Port Vale	1938–39	Third Division South	26	3	2	0	3	0	31	3
Port Vale	1939–40		0	0	0	0	2	0	2	0
Port Vale	1945–46		0	0	6	3	0	0	6	3
Port Vale	1946–47	Third Division South	38	10	5	2	—		43	12
Port Vale	1947–48	Third Division South	17	4	1	0	—		18	4
Port Vale	Total		82	18	14	5	5	0	101	23
Bury	1947–48	Second Division	17	4	0	0	0	0	17	4
Bury	1948–49	Second Division	27	6	1	0	0	0	28	6
Bury	1949–50	Second Division	34	5	3	2	0	0	37	7
Bury	1950–51	Second Division	17	3	1	0	0	0	18	3
Bury	Total		95	18	5	2	0	0	100	20
Swansea Town	1951–52	Second Division	37	11	3	1	0	0	40	12
Swansea Town	1952–53	Second Division	4	0	0	0	0	0	4	0
Swansea Town	Total		41	11	3	1	0	0	44	12
Chesterfield	1953–54	Third Division North	13	3	0	0	0	0	13	3
Career total			231	50	22	8	5	0	258	58
