= Arthur Bailey (footballer) =

English footballer (1911–2006)

Personal information
- Date of birth: 11 January 1911
- Place of birth: Beswick, Manchester, England
- Date of death: 2006 (aged 94–95)
- Height: 5 ft 7 in (1.70 m)
- Position: Inside left

Senior career*
Years	Team	Apps	(Gls)
1931–1932	Chapel-en-le-Frith		
1932–1933	Manchester North End		
1933–1936	Oldham Athletic	53	(11)
1936–1939	Stalybridge Celtic		
1939–1945	Oldham Athletic	0	(0)
1945–194?	Shrewsbury Town		
- * Club domestic league appearances and goals

Arthur Bailey (11 January 1911 – 2006) was an English footballer who played as an inside left for Chapel-en-le-Frith, Manchester North End, Oldham Athletic, and Stalybridge Celtic.

== Career ==
Bailey played for Chapel-en-le-Frith, Manchester North End, Oldham Athletic (in two spells), and Stalybridge Celtic. During World War II he played as a guest for Wolverhampton Wanderers, Manchester United, Blackpool, Rochdale, the Royal Air Force, and Port Vale.

== Career statistics ==
Appearances and goals by club, season and competition
Club	Season	League			FA Cup		Other		Total	
Club	Season	Division	Apps	Goals	Apps	Goals	Apps	Goals	Apps	Goals
Oldham Athletic	1933–34	Second Division	27	7	3	2	0	0	30	9
Oldham Athletic	1934–35	Second Division	24	2	1	0	0	0	25	2
Oldham Athletic	1935–36	Third Division North	2	2	0	0	0	0	2	2
Oldham Athletic	Total		53	11	4	2	0	0	57	13
Oldham Athletic	1939–40	–	0	0	0	0	1	0	1	0
