= George Moses =

English footballer (1920–1987)

Personal information
- Full name: George Moses
- Date of birth: 11 September 1920
- Place of birth: High Spen, England
- Date of death: 20 June 1987 (aged 66)
- Place of death: Scarborough, England
- Position: Inside right

Senior career*
Years	Team	Apps	(Gls)
1939–1946	Newcastle United	0	(0)
1946–1947	Hartlepools United	19	(4)
Total		19	(4)
- * Club domestic league appearances and goals

George Moses (11 September 1920 – 20 June 1987) was an English footballer who played as an inside-right for Newcastle United and Hartlepools United.

== Career ==
Moses signed with Newcastle United in October 1939. During World War II, he played one game as a guest for Port Vale, in a 2–1 defeat to Notts County at Meadow Lane in a Midland Cup, Qualifying Tournament match on 14 April 1945. He joined Hartlepools United in August 1946, and played 19 Third Division North and two FA Cup during the 1946–47 season, scoring four league goals.

== Career statistics ==
Appearances and goals by club, season and competition
Club	Season	League			FA Cup		Total	
Club	Season	Division	Apps	Goals	Apps	Goals	Apps	Goals
Newcastle United	1939–40	–	0	0	0	0	0	0
Hartlepools United	1946–47	Third Division North	19	4	2	0	21	4
Career total			19	4	2	0	21	4
