= Don Triner =

English footballer (1919–2002)

Personal information
- Full name: Donald Arthur Triner
- Date of birth: 21 August 1919
- Place of birth: Sandford Hill, Stoke-on-Trent, England
- Date of death: 2002 (aged 82–83)
- Height: 5 ft 5 in (1.65 m)
- Position: Right winger

Youth career
- Downing's Tileries

Senior career*
Years	Team	Apps	(Gls)
1938–1948	Port Vale	25	(7)
1948–1949	Witton Albion		
- Buxton
1952–1953	Biggleswade Town		
- Leek Town
- * Club domestic league appearances and goals

Donald Arthur Triner (21 August 1919 – 2002) was an English footballer who played for Port Vale either side of World War II.

== Career ==
Triner played for Downing's Tileries before joining Port Vale in December 1938. Before turning professional he was employed as a joiner in Hanley. In only his second game, a 1–0 home win at Bristol Rovers on 7 January 1939, he broke his leg. He managed to make guest appearances for Stafford Rangers from January to April 1940 before returning to guest for the Port Vale "A" team (the first-team were in abeyance due to the war). He was conscripted in 1941 and guested for Morecambe when he was stationed in the area. He was demobbed in the spring of 1946, and with the threat of Nazism vanquished, he returned to the Old Recreation Ground, breaking into the first team by December that year. He scored seven goals in 22 games in 1946–47. However, he once again broke his leg in May 1947, and failed to win back his place upon his recovery. He was released at the end of the 1947–48 season. At that point, he moved on to Witton Albion. He scored six goals in twenty games in the 1948–49 Cheshire County League title-winning season and featured seven times in the 1949–50 campaign. He later played for Buxton, Biggleswade Town (released in May 1953 having "failed to come anywhere near to expectation") and Leek Town.

== Career statistics ==
Appearances and goals by club, season and competition
Club	Season	League			FA Cup		Other		Total	
Club	Season	Division	Apps	Goals	Apps	Goals	Apps	Goals	Apps	Goals
Port Vale	1938–39	Third Division South	3	0	0	0	1	0	4	0
Port Vale	1946–47	Third Division South	20	6	2	1	—		22	7
Port Vale	1947–48	Third Division South	2	1	0	0	—		2	1
Port Vale	Total		25	7	2	1	1	0	28	8
Witton Albion	1948–49	Cheshire County League							20	6
Witton Albion	1949–50	Cheshire County League							7	0
Witton Albion	Total								27	6

== Honours ==
Witton Albion

- Cheshire County League: 1948–49
