= Norman Hallam =

English footballer

Personal information
- Full name: Norman Henry Hallam
- Date of birth: 23 October 1920
- Place of birth: Longton, England
- Date of death: 1997 (aged 76–77)
- Position: Half-back

Youth career
- Chelsea

Senior career*
Years	Team	Apps	(Gls)
1946–1953	Port Vale	63	(4)
1953–1954	Halifax Town	3	(0)
- Goole Town
Total		66+	(4+)
- * Club domestic league appearances and goals

Norman Henry Hallam (23 October 1920 – 1997) was an English footballer. A half-back, he helped Port Vale to finish second in the Third Division North in 1952–53. Whilst at the club, he became a Methodist minister. He later played for Halifax Town and Goole Town.

== Career ==
Hallam played for Chelsea before joining Port Vale in May 1946. He played 27 first-team games in 1946–47, scoring his first senior goal on 9 November, in a 4–1 defeat to Walsall at Fellows Park. He scored three goals in 30 games in 1947–48. He quit full-time football in July 1948 to become a Methodist Minister, but played one Third Division South game in 1949–50. At the end of the 1950–51 season he conducted the funeral of Gordon Hodgson, his former manager at Vale Park. Hallam re-joined the "Valiants" in January 1952, although did not play regularly, as living in Birmingham he couldn't always make it to matches. He played three games in 1951–52 and eight games in 1952–53, helping Freddie Steele's side to finish second in the Third Division North in the latter campaign. In May 1953, he moved house to Doncaster and left the club on a free transfer to Halifax Town. He played three games for the "Shaymen" in 1953–54. After leaving The Shay, he later played for Goole Town.

== Career statistics ==
Appearances and goals by club, season and competition
Club	Season	League			FA Cup		Total	
Club	Season	Division	Apps	Goals	Apps	Goals	Apps	Goals
Port Vale	1946–47	Third Division South	22	1	5	0	27	1
Port Vale	1947–48	Third Division South	29	3	1	0	30	3
Port Vale	1948–49	Third Division South	0	0	0	0	0	0
Port Vale	1949–50	Third Division South	1	0	0	0	1	0
Port Vale	1950–51	Third Division South	0	0	0	0	0	0
Port Vale	1951–52	Third Division South	3	0	0	0	3	0
Port Vale	1952–53	Third Division North	8	0	0	0	8	0
Port Vale	Total		63	4	6	0	69	4
Halifax Town	1953–54	Third Division North	3	0	1	0	4	0

== Honours ==
Port Vale

- Football League Third Division North second-place promotion: 1952–53
