= Arthur Bateman (footballer, born 1918) =

English footballer

Personal information
- Full name: Arthur Bateman
- Date of birth: 12 June 1918
- Place of birth: Audley, Staffordshire, England
- Date of death: November 1984 (age 66)
- Place of death: Staffordshire, England
- Position: Full-back

Senior career*
Years	Team	Apps	(Gls)
1946–1947	Crewe Alexandra	3	(0)
- Northwich Victoria
- * Club domestic league appearances and goals

Arthur Bateman (12 June 1918 – November 1984) was an English footballer who played as a full-back for Crewe Alexandra and Northwich Victoria.

== Career ==
Bateman played for Crewe Alexandra during World War II and also guested for Port Vale in December 1944. He played against Crewe for Vale in a war cup match on 30 December 1944, which Crewe won 2–1 at Gresty Road. He made a further twelve appearances before returning to Crewe. After three appearances in the Third Division North of the Football League for Frank Hill's "Railwaymen" in 1946–47, he moved on to Cheshire County League side Northwich Victoria in 1947.
