= Stephen Hughes (footballer, born 1919) =

English footballer

Personal information
- Full name: Stephen Hamer Hughes
- Date of birth: 11 November 1919
- Place of birth: Aigburth, England
- Date of death: 9 February 1981 (aged 61)
- Place of death: Liverpool, England
- Position: Centre-half

Youth career
- Old Collegians

Senior career*
Years	Team	Apps	(Gls)
1937	Oldham Athletic	0	(0)
1937–1938	Stalybridge Celtic		
1938–1945	New Brighton	17	(0)
- Tranmere Rovers
- Crewe Alexandra
- * Club domestic league appearances and goals

Stephen Hamer Hughes (11 November 1919 – 9 February 1981) was an English footballer who played as a centre-half for Oldham Athletic, Stalybridge Celtic, New Brighton, Tranmere Rovers, and Crewe Alexandra.

== Career ==
Hughes played for Oldham Athletic, Stalybridge Celtic, New Brighton, Tranmere Rovers, and Crewe Alexandra. During World War II he played as a guest for Notts County, Liverpool, Watford, and Port Vale.

== Career statistics ==
Appearances and goals by club, season and competition
Club	Season	League			Other		Total	
Club	Season	Division	Apps	Goals	Apps	Goals	Apps	Goals
Oldham Athletic	1937–38	Third Division North	0	0	0	0	0	0
New Brighton	1938–39	Third Division North	17	0	1	0	18	0
New Brighton	1939–40		0	0	3	0	3	0
New Brighton	Total		17	0	4	0	21	0
Career total			17	0	4	0	21	0
