= Joseph Dixon (Australian cricketer) =

Australian cricketer

Joseph Black Dixon
Personal information
- Born: 26 September 1836; Hobart, Tasmania, Australia
- Died: 6 March 1882 (aged 45); Battery Point, Tasmania, Australia

Domestic team information
- Years: Team
- 1858: Tasmania
- Source: Cricinfo, 5 January 2016

Joseph Black Dixon (26 September 1836 – 6 March 1882) was an Australian cricketer. He played two first-class matches for Tasmania in 1858. At the time of his death, he was the manager of the Brisbane branch of the Bank of Australasia.

== See also ==
- List of Tasmanian representative cricketers
