= 1950–51 Scottish Division B =

Scottish Division B
- Season: 1950–51
- Champions: Queen of the South
- Promoted: Queen of the South; Stirling Albion

The 1950–51 Scottish Division B was won by Queen of the South who, along with second placed Stirling Albion, were promoted to Division A. Alloa Athletic finished bottom.

== Table ==
Pos	Team	Pld	W	D	L	GF	GA	GD	Pts	Promotion or relegation
1	Queen of the South	30	21	3	6	69	35	+34	45	Promotion to the 1951–52 Division A
2	Stirling Albion	30	21	3	6	78	44	+34	45	Promotion to the 1951–52 Division A
3	Ayr United	30	15	6	9	64	40	+24	36	
4	Dundee United	30	16	4	10	78	58	+20	36	
5	St Johnstone	30	14	5	11	68	53	+15	33	
6	Queen's Park	30	13	7	10	56	53	+3	33	
7	Hamilton Academical	30	12	8	10	65	49	+16	32	
8	Albion Rovers	30	14	4	12	56	51	+5	32	
9	Dumbarton	30	12	5	13	52	53	−1	29	
10	Dunfermline Athletic	30	12	4	14	58	73	−15	28	
11	Cowdenbeath	30	12	3	15	61	57	+4	27	
12	Kilmarnock	30	8	8	14	44	49	−5	24	
13	Arbroath	30	8	5	17	46	78	−32	21	
14	Forfar Athletic	30	9	3	18	43	76	−33	21	
15	Stenhousemuir	30	9	2	19	51	80	−29	20	
16	Alloa Athletic	30	7	4	19	58	98	−40	18	

Source: "1950-1951 Division B - SPFL Archive". SPFL.
