= Bob Pursell (footballer, born 1919) =

Scottish footballer

Personal information
- Full name: Robert Wilson Pursell
- Date of birth: 28 September 1919
- Place of birth: Glasgow, Scotland
- Date of death: August 2005 (age 85)
- Place of death: Minehead, England
- Position: Full-back

Youth career
- Northwood B.S.C.
- Chesterton

Senior career*
Years	Team	Apps	(Gls)
	Wolverhampton Wanderers	0	(0)
1939–1949	Port Vale	39	(0)
- Winsford United
- Northwich Victoria
- Michelin
- * Club domestic league appearances and goals

Robert Wilson Pursell (28 September 1919 – August 2005) was a Scottish footballer who played as a full-back for Wolverhampton Wanderers, Port Vale, Winsford United, and Northwich Victoria. He was the son of Peter Pursell and nephew to Bob Pursell, who were also defenders who played for Port Vale.

== Career ==
Pursell played for Northwood B.S.C., Chesterton and Wolverhampton Wanderers before joining Port Vale on trial from Chesterton in November 1939 and signing professional forms the next month. During the war his career was put on hold, and he guested for Boulton Paul Aircraft Ltd. and the Bristol Aeroplane Company Ltd. As Vale began playing football again in August 1944, he returned to the Old Recreation Ground, but he was only utilized regularly from September 1945. He made 32 Third Division South and five FA Cup appearances in the 1946–47 season. However, he played just seven games in the 1947–48 season, and manager Gordon Hodgson allowed him a transfer to Winsford United in July 1949. Later he played for Northwich Victoria and Michelin.

== Career statistics ==
Appearances and goals by club, season and competition
Club	Season	League			FA Cup		Total	
Club	Season	Division	Apps	Goals	Apps	Goals	Apps	Goals
Port Vale	1945–46		0	0	3	0	3	0
Port Vale	1946–47	Third Division South	32	0	5	0	37	0
Port Vale	1947–48	Third Division South	7	0	0	0	7	0
Port Vale	Total		39	0	8	0	47	0
