= Wilf Smith (footballer, born 1917) =

English footballer (1917–1995)

Personal information
- Full name: Wilfred Smith
- Date of birth: 18 April 1917
- Place of birth: Hanley, England
- Date of death: 4 May 1995 (aged 78)
- Place of death: Hartshill, Stoke-on-Trent, England
- Height: 5 ft 7 in (1.70 m)
- Positions: Half-back; right-back

Youth career
- Hot Lane Juniors
- Sneyd Colliery

Senior career*
Years	Team	Apps	(Gls)
1936–1950	Port Vale	87	(0)
- Buxton
- Stafford Rangers
- * Club domestic league appearances and goals

Wilfred Smith (18 April 1917 – 4 May 1995) was an English footballer who played as a midfielder for Port Vale either side of World War II. He made 164 appearances for the club in league and cup competitions and later played for Buxton and Stafford Rangers.

== Career ==
Smith joined Port Vale from Sneyd Colliery in October 1936. He made his Third Division North debut in the 1936–37 season, before playing 21 league games in the 1937–38 campaign. He made 37 appearances in the Third Division South during the 1938–39 campaign. He guested for Nottingham Forest and Southend United during World War II. He returned to the Old Recreation Ground after the war and featured 27 times in the 1946–47 season. He played only once in each of the 1947–48 and 1948–49 campaigns, and was given a free transfer in April 1950 by manager Gordon Hodgson. He finished his career playing for non-League sides Buxton and Stafford Rangers, before becoming a scout for Portsmouth.

== Career statistics ==
Appearances and goals by club, season and competition
Club	Season	League			FA Cup		Other		Total	
Club	Season	Division	Apps	Goals	Apps	Goals	Apps	Goals	Apps	Goals
Port Vale	1936–37	Third Division North	1	0	0	0	0	0	1	0
Port Vale	1937–38	Third Division North	21	0	0	0	1	0	22	0
Port Vale	1938–39	Third Division South	37	0	2	0	1	0	40	0
Port Vale	1939–40		0	0	0	0	2	0	2	0
Port Vale	1945–46		0	0	6	0	0	0	6	0
Port Vale	1946–47	Third Division South	26	0	2	0	—		28	0
Port Vale	1947–48	Third Division South	1	0	0	0	—		1	0
Port Vale	1948–49	Third Division South	1	0	0	0	—		1	0
Port Vale	1949–50	Third Division South	0	0	0	0	—		0	0
Port Vale	Total		87	0	10	0	4	0	101	0
