= Richard Roberts (English footballer) =

20th-century footballer

Personal information
- Position: Forward

Senior career*
| Years | Team | Apps | (Gls) |
| 19??–1946 | Crewe Alexandra | 0 | (0) |
- * Club domestic league appearances and goals

Richard Roberts was an English footballer who played as a forward for Crewe Alexandra.

== Career ==
Roberts was signed to Crewe Alexandra during World War II. He played two games as a guest at nearby Port Vale in August and September 1944.

== Career statistics ==
Appearances and goals by club, season and competition
| Club | Season | League | | | FA Cup | | Total | |
| Club | Season | Division | Apps | Goals | Apps | Goals | Apps | Goals |
|---|---|---|---|---|---|---|---|---|
| Crewe Alexandra | 1945–46 | – | 0 | 0 | 2 | 0 | 2 | 0 |
| Career total | | | 0 | 0 | 2 | 0 | 2 | 0 |
