= Albert Hankey =

English footballer

Personal information
- Full name: Albert Edward Hankey
- Date of birth: 24 May 1914
- Place of birth: Stoke-upon-Trent, England
- Date of death: 1998 (aged 83–84)
- Position: Goalkeeper

Youth career
- Silverdale Co-op

Senior career*
Years	Team	Apps	(Gls)
	Stoke City	0	(0)
1935–1936	Charlton Athletic	0	(0)
1937–1950	Southend United	125	(0)
1950–195?	Tonbridge		
Total		125	(0)
- * Club domestic league appearances and goals

Albert Edward Hankey (24 May 1914 – 1998) was an English footballer who played as a goalkeeper for Stoke City, Charlton Athletic, Southend United, and Tonbridge.

== Career ==
Hankey played for Stoke City, Charlton Athletic, and Southend United. He played four matches as a guest for Port Vale during World War II. He later played for Tonbridge.

== Career statistics ==
Appearances and goals by club, season and competition
Club	Season	League			FA Cup		Other		Total	
Club	Season	Division	Apps	Goals	Apps	Goals	Apps	Goals	Apps	Goals
Charlton Athletic	1935–36	Second Division	0	0	0	0	0	0	0	0
Southend United	1937–38	Third Division South	6	0	0	0	0	0	6	0
Southend United	1938–39	Third Division South	15	0	0	0	1	0	16	0
Southend United	1946–47	Third Division South	38	0	3	0	0	0	41	0
Southend United	1947–48	Third Division South	24	0	1	0	0	0	25	0
Southend United	1948–49	Third Division South	11	0	0	0	0	0	11	0
Southend United	1949–50	Third Division South	31	0	4	0	0	0	35	0
Southend United	Total		125	0	8	0	1	0	134	0
Career total			125	0	8	0	1	0	134	0
