= Jack Diffin =

Irish footballer and manager

Personal information
- Position: Goalkeeper

Senior career*
Years	Team	Apps	(Gls)
- Belfast Celtic
- Linfield
- Dartford

International career
1931	Ireland	1	(0)

Managerial career
- 1944–1945: Port Vale
- * Club domestic league appearances and goals

Jack Diffin was an Irish international footballer and football manager. He played in goal for Belfast Celtic, Linfield, and Dartford, was capped once by his country, and briefly managed Port Vale.

== Playing career ==
Diffin played for Belfast Celtic, Linfield and Dartford. He was capped by Ireland in 1931. After retirement, he set up a road haulage business.

== Management career ==
Diffin became a Port Vale director in 1944 and appointed team manager in October of that year. David Pratt was appointed as manager in December 1944 but failed to gain a release from the Air Force and so never managed to be a manager to the Vale other than in name only. Diffin remained the effective manager until August 1945, when Billy Frith was appointed. Diffin then concentrated on his board duties before being elected vice-chairman in 1946, finally stepping down in December 1957.

== Business career ==
Diffin ran a general drapery and boot merchants business in Belfast and established a road haulage company in England.
