= Joe Dixon (footballer, born 1916) =

English footballer (1916–2001)

Personal information
- Full name: Joseph Dixon
- Date of birth: 24 September 1916
- Place of birth: Newcastle-under-Lyme, England
- Date of death: 2001 (aged 84–85)
- Position: Centre-forward

Youth career
- Audley United

Senior career*
| Years | Team | Apps | (Gls) |
| 1945–1946 | Northampton Town | 0 | (0) |
| 1946–1947 | Port Vale | 1 | (0) |
| 1947 | Witton Albion | | |
| Total | | 1+ | (0+) |
- * Club domestic league appearances and goals

Joseph Dixon (24 September 1916 – 2001) was an English footballer who played as a centre-forward for Audley United, Northampton Town, Port Vale, and Witton Albion.

== Career ==
Dixon played for non-League side Audley United and Football League Third Division South club Northampton Town, before joining Port Vale, also of the Third Division South, in October 1946. His debut came on Christmas Day 1946, in a goalless draw at Aldershot. This was to be his only game for the club, however, as he was transferred to Witton Albion in March 1947. He scored five goals in three games in what remained of the 1946–47 season.

== Career statistics ==
Appearances and goals by club, season and competition
| Club | Season | League | | | FA Cup | | Total | |
| Club | Season | Division | Apps | Goals | Apps | Goals | Apps | Goals |
|---|---|---|---|---|---|---|---|---|
| Northampton Town | 1946–46 | – | 0 | 0 | 0 | 0 | 0 | 0 |
| Port Vale | 1946–47 | Third Division South | 1 | 0 | 0 | 0 | 1 | 0 |
