= Potteries Shopping Centre =

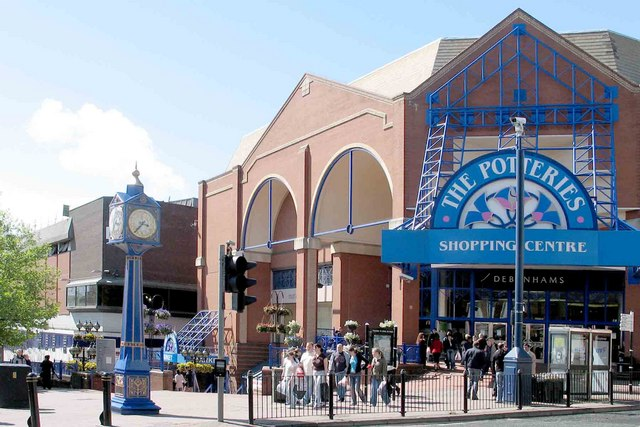
- Location: Hanley, Stoke-on-Trent, England
- Coordinates: 53°01′38.16″N 2°10′32.88″W
- Opened: 1988
- Owner: Belgate Estates
- Num. of stores: 90+
- Num. of anchor tenants: 3
- Floor area: 650,000 sq ft (60,000 m^{2})
- Floors: 3 (4 inc. Market Hall)
- Parking: 1,240 spaces
- Website: potteriescentre.co.uk

The Potteries Shopping Centre (formerly Intu Potteries) is an indoor shopping centre in Hanley, Stoke-on-Trent, in the Staffordshire Potteries.

== Stores and facilities ==
The centre houses anchor outlet Primark, as well as a Starbucks coffee shop, a The Entertainer toy and entertainment store, a H&M clothing store and HMV entertainment store. On site facilities include a Customer Service Desk, information and traffic kiosks, and public toilets.

=== The Hive ===
The Hive is an outdoor leisure complex connected to the centre via the multi-storey carpark. It consists of a number of restaurants including Bon Pan Asian, Nando's. The facility also includes a nine screen Cineworld multiplex movie theatre.

== Hanley Market Hall ==
The centre also contains access to the Hanley Market Hall, which dates back to the 17th century. The market opened at its current location in 1987, although it still stands on the grounds of the 1849 market hall.
