= Old Recreation Ground =

Football stadium in Stoke-on-Trent, England

- The Rec
- Interactive map of Old Recreation Ground
- Location: Hanley, Stoke-on-Trent, England
- Coordinates: 53°01′38.16″N 2°10′32.88″W
- Capacity: 20,000
- Surface: Grass
- Field size: 110 yards (100 m) by 70 yards (64 m)

Construction
- Opened: 1913
- Closed: 1950
- Demolished: 1954/55

Tenant
- Port Vale F.C. (1913–1950)

The Old Recreation Ground was a football stadium located in Hanley, Stoke-on-Trent, England, and home to Port Vale F.C. from 1913 to 1950. It was the sixth ground the club used.

== Structure and facilities ==
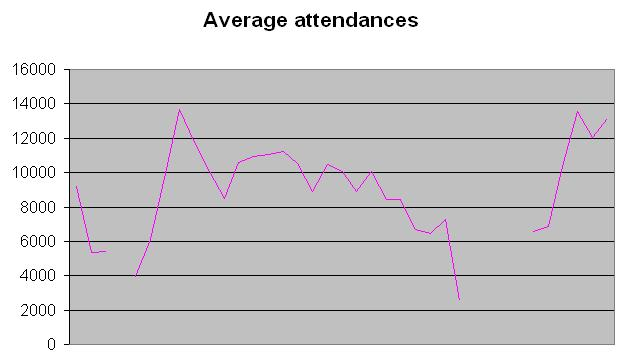
Average attendances, 1913–1950.

The stadium was in rather bad condition, especially following years of neglect during World War II. The dressing rooms were bare, there were no toilet facilities throughout the entire ground, and racing pigeons were kept by The Sentinel and some supporters to relay the scoreline to different parts of the city.

== History ==
Port Vale F.C. opened the ground in 1913, and six years later were admitted into the English Football League. The visit of Potteries derby rivals Stoke on 6 March 1920 saw a crowd of 22,697 turn up to see an away victory. Other big matches for Port Vale went more favourably in later years though, as they drew 2–2 with Arsenal in the FA Cup on 29 January 1927 and beat Sunderland 2–0 on 13 January 1936, again in the FA Cup.

Port Vale were forced to sell the land to the city council, under the chairmanship of Tom W.Flint after suffering a financial crisis; they received £13,500. This came after the club's president Major William Huntbach died in 1943, leaving £3,000 of loans to be repaid to his estate. The council initially refused to allow the club to play at their ground. Eventually, it relented to rent for £400 a year. In 1950, the city council decided to construct a shopping centre on the site, forcing the club to move to their current home of Vale Park. Ironically, the club raised £50,000 to construct the new stadium, leading some to question why the directors did not simply attempt to raise a much smaller sum of £3,000 to pay off the Huntbach family. The final match at the Old Recreation Ground was described as an "uninspiring finale" as Vale lost 1–0 to Aldershot in front of a crowd of 9,645 on 22 April 1950. The Popular Stand was moved to the newly-constructed Vale Park.
