= 1945–46 Port Vale F.C. season =

Port Vale F.C.
1945–46 season
- Chairman: Tom Flint
- Manager: Billy Frith
- Stadium: Old Recreation Ground
- Third Division (South) North: 3rd (24 points)
- FA Cup: Third Round (eliminated by Bradford (Park Avenue))
- Third Division (South) North Cup: 8th (14 points)
- Top goalscorer: League: Bill Pointon (9); All: Bill Pointon (19)
- Highest home attendance: 11,388 vs. Queens Park Rangers, 30 March 1946
- Lowest home attendance: 2,632 vs. Notts County, 26 January 1946
- Average home league attendance: 7,212
- Biggest win: 4–0 (twice) and 5–1
- Biggest defeat: 1–4 vs. Queens Park Rangers, 29 September 1945
Home colours

The 1945–46 season was Port Vale's third and final season of football in the wartime league system of World War II. Under the management of Billy Frith and chairmanship of Tom Flint, Vale secured a strong third‑place finish with 24 points, positioned eight points behind champions Queens Park Rangers.

In cup competition, the club reached the third round of the FA Cup, producing a commendable two‑leg display against Bradford (Park Avenue) after earlier victories over Wellington Town and Marine — but ultimately bowed out on aggregate score. Meanwhile, their form in the Third Division (South) North Cup was less impressive, finishing 8th with 14 points.

Bill Pointon led the scoring charts with 19 goals in all competitions, including nine in the league, while Alf Bellis chimed in with 16 across all formats. The campaign drew an average home attendance of 7,212, peaking at 11,388 for the fixture versus Queens Park Rangers on 30 March, and dipping to 2,632 at the low‑attended match against Notts County on 26 January.

Overall, Vale ended the 1945–46 season in robust shape, laying a solid foundation for a return to regular Football League competition in 1946–47.

== Overview ==
The Port Vale management was concerned to learn that they were to compete in the Third Division (South) region for the 1945–46 season, which they felt would result in less revenue and greater expenditure than being in the North division, even though they were still somewhat confusingly placed in the North region of the South Division. They appointed 33-year-old former Coventry City half-back Billy Frith as the club's new manager, as predecessor David Pratt was unable to gain release from the Royal Air Force. Again, the playing squad was made up mainly of young players and guests, with Scottish inside-right Isaac McDowell being a regular guest. They opened the campaign with three victories from three games, Ralph Gregory proving a revelation on leave from the Royal Marines, scoring a hat-trick in a 4–3 win at Norwich City. However, seven games without a victory began with the return fixture with Norwich, before they were boosted by the return of the now demobilised goalkeeper Arthur Jepson. They picked up six of a possible eight points in October. They continued their good form until the end of the New Year's Day league programme. They finished in third place with 24 points in 20 games, eight points behind champions Queens Park Rangers.

They progressed past Wellington Town and Liverpool County Combination amateurs Marine to reach the third round of the FA Cup, which was now being played over two legs. They "put up a grand show" against Bradford (Park Avenue) at Park Avenue, losing 2–1. They then had to settle for a 1–1 draw at home, being denied a penalty and then having a goal ruled out for offside late in the game. A 16-game Third Division (South) North Cup series then began, with the top two teams entering the division's semi-finals. Though they fared poorly, they were fortunate enough to have goalkeeper George Heppell demobilised in time to take the place of an injured Arthur Jepson. Tommy Cheadle made his club debut in a 4–1 home victory over Ipswich Town on 2 March. However, this was only one of two victories in the final ten games as Frith experimented with different line-ups to find a winning combination. They ended the season in eighth place, picking up 14 points from 16 games. Bill Pointon was a consistent goalscorer, hitting 19 goals. The club made a profit of £1,265 on the season, having made a healthy £13,475 in gate receipt money. The City Council agreed to extend the lease on the Old Recreation Ground until June 1950, leaving ample time for Vale Park to be constructed.

== Results ==
Win	Draw	Loss

=== Third Division (South) North ===
==== League table ====
Pos	Team	Pld	W	D	L	GF	GA	GR	Pts
2	Norwich City	20	11	4	5	54	31	1.742	26
3	Port Vale	20	9	6	5	34	25	1.360	24
4	Watford	20	10	2	8	42	47	0.894	22

Source: Rec.Sport.Soccer Statistics Foundation

==== Matches ====
25 August 1945 1	Burslem Port Vale	3–2	Ipswich Town	Hanley
	Pointon; Bellis; Jones			Stadium: Old Recreation Ground; Attendance: 6,080

30 August 1945 2	Norwich City	3–4	Burslem Port Vale	Norwich
			Gregory; Allen	Stadium: Carrow Road; Attendance: 7,507

1 September 1945 3	Ipswich Town	0–1	Burslem Port Vale	Ipswich
			Gregory	Stadium: Portman Road; Attendance: 11,512

3 September 1945 4	Burslem Port Vale	2–2	Norwich City	Hanley
	Gregory; McDowell			Stadium: Old Recreation Ground; Attendance: 7,426

8 September 1945 5	Northampton	1–0	Burslem Port Vale	Northampton
				Stadium: County Cricket Ground; Attendance: 5,815

15 September 1945 6	Burslem Port Vale	0–0	Northampton	Hanley
				Stadium: Old Recreation Ground; Attendance: 6,534

19 September 1945 7	Notts County	3–1	Burslem Port Vale	Nottingham
			McDowell	Stadium: Meadow Lane; Attendance: 5,857

22 September 1945 8	Burslem Port Vale	0–0	Queens Park Rangers	Hanley
				Stadium: Old Recreation Ground; Attendance: 8,382

29 September 1945 9	Queens Park Rangers	4–1	Burslem Port Vale	Shepherd's Bush, West London
	Mallett; Heathcote; Abel; Neary		Pointon	Stadium: Loftus Road; Attendance: 13,797

6 October 1945 10	Clapton Orient	1–1	Burslem Port Vale	Leyton, East London
			Cumner	Stadium: Brisbane Road; Attendance: 4,817

13 October 1945 11	Burslem Port Vale	4–0	Clapton Orient	Hanley
	Pointon; Bellis; Jones			Stadium: Old Recreation Ground; Attendance: 7,791

20 October 1945 12	Burslem Port Vale	2–1	Watford	Hanley
	Bellis; Pointon			Stadium: Old Recreation Ground; Attendance: 7,607

27 October 1945 13	Watford	2–2	Burslem Port Vale	Watford
			Allen; Bellis	Stadium: Vicarage Road; Attendance: 5,528

1 December 1945 14	Mansfield Town	1–2	Burslem Port Vale	Mansfield
			McDowell (og.)	Stadium: Field Mill; Attendance: 3,761

22 December 1945 15	Southend United	2–0	Burslem Port Vale	Southend-on-Sea
				Stadium: Southend Stadium; Attendance: 2,544

24 December 1945 16	Burslem Port Vale	2–0	Mansfield Town	Hanley
	Davies			Stadium: Old Recreation Ground; Attendance: 6,000

25 December 1945 17	Walsall	1–5	Burslem Port Vale	Walsall
			Pointon; Shore; Davies; Bellis	Stadium: Fellows Park; Attendance: 5,804

26 December 1945 18	Burslem Port Vale	0–1	Walsall	Hanley
				Stadium: Old Recreation Ground; Attendance: 11,200

29 December 1945 19	Burslem Port Vale	3–0	Notts County	Hanley
	Pointon; Bellis			Stadium: Old Recreation Ground; Attendance: 8,200

1 January 1946 20	Burslem Port Vale	1–1	Southend United	Hanley
	Shore			Stadium: Old Recreation Ground; Attendance: 2,900

=== FA Cup ===
17 November 1944 R1 Leg 1	Burslem Port Vale	4–0	Wellington Town	Hanley
	McDowell; Pointon (og.)	Report		Stadium: Old Recreation Ground; Attendance: 8,700

24 November 1944 R1 Leg 2	Wellington Town	0–2 (0–6 agg.)	Burslem Port Vale	Wellington, Shropshire
		Report	Bellis; McDowell	Attendance: 5,056

8 December 1944 R2 Leg 1	Burslem Port Vale	3–1	Marine	Hanley
	Allen; Gregory	Report		Stadium: Old Recreation Ground; Attendance: 5,800

15 December 1944 R2 Leg 2	Marine	1–1 (2–4 agg.)	Burslem Port Vale	Crosby, Merseyside
		Report	Gregory	Stadium: Rossett Park; Attendance: 5,000

5 January 1945 R3 Leg 1	Bradford (Park Avenue)	2–1	Burslem Port Vale	Bradford
		Report	Bellis	Stadium: Park Avenue; Attendance: 13,000

7 January 1945 R3 Leg 2	Burslem Port Vale	1–1 (2–3 agg.)	Bradford (Park Avenue)	Hanley
	Bellis	Report		Stadium: Old Recreation Ground; Attendance: 11,086

=== Third Division (South) North Cup ===
==== League table ====
Pos	Team	Pld	W	D	L	GF	GA	GR	Pts
7	Clapton Orient	16	6	3	7	22	31	0.710	15
8	Port Vale	16	5	4	7	21	25	0.840	14
9	Northampton Town	16	5	2	9	27	29	0.931	12

Source: Rec.Sport.Soccer Statistics Foundation

==== Matches ====
12 January 1946 1	Walsall	3–1	Burslem Port Vale	Walsall
			Bellis	Stadium: Fellows Park; Attendance: 5,523

19 January 1946 2	Burslem Port Vale	1–0	Walsall	Hanley
	Cooper			Stadium: Old Recreation Ground; Attendance: 3,229

26 January 1946 3	Burslem Port Vale	2–1	Notts County	Hanley
	Wootton; Pointon			Stadium: Old Recreation Ground; Attendance: 2,632

2 February 1946 4	Notts County	3–2	Burslem Port Vale	Nottingham
			Pointon; Gardner	Stadium: Meadow Lane; Attendance: 5,000

9 February 1946 5	Bristol Rovers	4–2	Burslem Port Vale	Bristol
			Pointon	Stadium: Eastville Stadium; Attendance: 9,500

16 February 1946 6	Burslem Port Vale	1–0	Bristol Rovers	Hanley
	Pointon			Stadium: Old Recreation Ground; Attendance: 4,554

23 February 1946 7	Ipswich Town	1–0	Burslem Port Vale	Ipswich
				Stadium: Portman Road; Attendance: 7,500

2 March 1946 8	Burslem Port Vale	4–1	Ipswich Town	Hanley
	Bellis; Pointon			Stadium: Old Recreation Ground; Attendance: 3,200

9 March 1946 9	Clapton Orient	0–0	Burslem Port Vale	Leyton, East London
				Stadium: Brisbane Road; Attendance: 6,197

16 March 1946 10	Burslem Port Vale	2–2	Clapton Orient	Hanley
	Pointon; Bellis			Stadium: Old Recreation Ground; Attendance: 8,283

23 March 1946 11	Queens Park Rangers	4–2	Burslem Port Vale	Shepherd's Bush, West London
	Heath; McEwan; Neary		Shore; Pointon	Attendance: 13,274

30 March 1946 12	Burslem Port Vale	0–2	Queens Park Rangers	Hanley
			(og.); Neary	Stadium: Old Recreation Ground; Attendance: 11,388

6 April 1946 13	Mansfield Town	2–1	Burslem Port Vale	Mansfield
			Bellis	Attendance: 5,777

13 April 1946 14	Burslem Port Vale	0–0	Mansfield Town	Hanley
				Stadium: Old Recreation Ground; Attendance: 6,768

20 April 1946 15	Burslem Port Vale	2–1	Southend United	Hanley
	Cheadle; Bellis			Stadium: Old Recreation Ground; Attendance: 7,016

22 April 1946 16	Southend United	1–1	Burslem Port Vale	Southend-on-Sea
			Bellis	Attendance: 8,500

== Squad statistics ==
=== Appearances and goals ===
Key to positions: GK – Goalkeeper; FB – Full back; HB – Half back; FW – Forward

No.	Pos	Nat	Player	Total		League		FA Cup		Region Cup	
No.	Pos	Nat	Player	Apps	Goals	Apps	Goals	Apps	Goals	Apps	Goals
	GK	(England) ENG	George Heppell	10	0	0	0	0	0	10	0
	GK	(England) ENG	Arthur Jepson	20	0	10	0	6	0	4	0
	GK	(England) ENG	Harry Prince	12	0	10	0	0	0	2	0
	FB	(England) ENG	Roy Felton	15	0	7	0	5	0	3	0
	FB	(England) ENG	Stan Kelley	1	0	0	0	0	0	1	0
	FB	(England) ENG	Reg Potts	4	0	4	0	0	0	0	0
	FB	(Scotland) SCO	Bob Pursell	28	0	15	0	3	0	10	0
	FB	(England) ENG	Roger Whittle	2	0	2	0	0	0	0	0
	HB	(England) ENG	Tommy Cheadle	9	1	0	0	0	0	9	1
	HB	(England) ENG	Arthur Cooper	41	1	19	0	6	0	16	1
	HB	(England) ENG	Harry Griffiths	32	0	18	0	6	0	8	0
	HB	(England) ENG	Cyril Johnson	1	0	0	0	0	0	1	0
	HB	(England) ENG	Bill McGarry	2	0	2	0	0	0	0	0
	HB	(England) ENG	Ted Oldfield	15	0	2	0	2	0	11	0
	HB	(England) ENG	Frank Pointon	8	0	6	0	0	0	2	0
	HB	(England) ENG	Wilf Smith	35	0	13	0	6	0	16	0
	FW	(England) ENG	Ronnie Allen	24	4	9	2	6	2	9	0
	FW	(England) ENG	Alf Bellis	33	16	15	6	6	3	12	7
	FW	(England) ENG	Ellis Birchall	3	0	2	0	1	0	0	0
	FW	(England) ENG	Billy Buckley	1	0	1	0	0	0	0	0
	FW	(England) ENG	Billy Byrne	1	0	0	0	0	0	1	0
	FW	(England) ENG	Jack Clunn	1	0	1	0	0	0	0	0
	FW	(England) ENG	Arthur Cumberlidge	2	0	0	0	0	0	2	0
	FW	(Wales) WAL	Horace Cumner	7	1	7	1	0	0	0	0
	FW	(England) ENG	Eddie Davies	10	3	5	3	2	0	3	0
	FW	(England) ENG	Ken Faulkner	1	0	1	0	0	0	0	0
	FW	(England) ENG	Fred Gardner	3	1	0	0	0	0	3	1
	FW	(England) ENG	George Gould	3	0	3	0	0	0	0	0
	FW	(England) ENG	Ralph Gregory	10	7	6	5	2	2	2	0
	FW	(England) ENG	Jimmy Hutchinson	1	0	0	0	0	0	1	0
	FW	(England) ENG	George James	1	0	1	0	0	0	0	0
	FW	(England) ENG	John Lowndes	1	0	1	0	0	0	0	0
	FW	(England) ENG	Colin Lyman	4	0	0	0	0	0	4	0
	FW	(England) ENG	Edward Nutting	2	0	1	0	0	0	1	0
	FW	(England) ENG	Bill Pointon	31	19	13	9	5	1	13	9
	FW	(England) ENG	Eric Prince	2	0	2	0	0	0	0	0
	FW	(England) ENG	Ted Shore	24	3	10	2	5	0	9	1
	FW	(England) ENG	Dennis Simpson	1	0	0	0	0	0	1	0
	FW	(England) ENG	Jess Sproson	2	0	2	0	0	0	0	0
	FW	(England) ENG	Frank Soo	1	0	1	0	0	0	0	0
	FW	(England) ENG	Don Triner	3	0	0	0	0	0	3	0
	MF	(England) ENG	Ken Watkin	1	0	0	0	0	0	1	0
	HB	(England) ENG	Ernie Willett	1	0	0	0	0	0	1	0
	FW	(England) ENG	George Willis	1	0	0	0	0	0	1	0
	FW	(England) ENG	Len Wootton	24	1	9	0	1	0	14	1
	FW	(England) ENG	Bert Wright	1	0	0	0	0	0	1	0
Players who featured but departed the club during the season:
	HB	(England) ENG	Harold Jervis	4	0	4	0	0	0	0	0
	FW	(Scotland) SCO	Murdoch Dickie	1	0	1	0	0	0	0	0
	FW	(England) ENG	Francis Jones	5	2	5	2	0	0	0	0
	FW	(Scotland) SCO	Isaac McDowell	17	6	12	3	4	3	1	0

=== Top scorers ===
Place	Position	Nation	Name	Third Division North	FA Cup	North Cup	Total
1	FW	England	Bill Pointon	9	1	9	19
2	FW	England	Alf Bellis	6	3	7	16
3	FW	England	Ralph Gregory	5	2	0	7
4	FW	Scotland	Isaac McDowell	3	3	0	6
5	FW	England	Ronnie Allen	2	2	0	4
6	FW	England	Ted Shore	2	0	1	3
–	FW	England	Eddie Davies	3	0	0	3
8	FW	England	Francis Jones	2	0	0	2
9	FW	Wales	Horace Cumner	1	0	0	1
–	HB	England	Tommy Cheadle	0	0	1	1
–	HB	England	Arthur Cooper	0	0	1	1
–	FW	England	Fred Gardner	0	0	1	1
–	FW	England	Len Wootton	0	0	1	1
–	–	–	Own goals	1	1	0	2
			TOTALS	34	12	21	67

== Transfers ==
=== Transfers in ===
Date from	Position	Nationality	Name	From	Fee	Ref.
August 1945	FW	ENG	Francis Jones		Free transfer	
August 1945	FB	ENG	Reg Potts	Stoke City	Free transfer	
August 1945	FW	ENG	Len Wootton		Free transfer	
September 1945	FW	ENG	Ted Shore		Free transfer	
December 1945	HB	ENG	Ted Oldfield	Helsby	Free transfer	
January 1946	FW	ENG	George James		Free transfer	
March 1946	FW	ENG	Billy Byrne		Free transfer	
March 1946	HB	ENG	Tommy Cheadle		Free transfer	

=== Transfers out ===
Date from	Position	Nationality	Name	To	Fee	Ref.
Autumn 1945	FW	SCO	Murdoch Dickie	Guildford City	Released	
1946	HB	ENG	Harold Jervis	Royal Air Force	Released	
1946	FW	ENG	Francis Jones		Released	
January 1946	FW	SCO	Isaac McDowell	(Scotland) Cowdenbeath	Released	
May 1946	FW	ENG	Edward Nutting		Released	
Summer 1946	FW	ENG	Billy Buckley		Released	
Summer 1946	FW	ENG	Jack Clunn		Released	
Summer 1946	FW	ENG	Arthur Cumberlidge	Northwich Victoria	Released	
Summer 1946	FB	ENG	Roy Felton	Crystal Palace	Refused terms	
Summer 1946	FW	ENG	George James		Released	
Summer 1946	FW	ENG	Cyril Johnson		Released	
Summer 1946	FB	ENG	Roger Whittle		Released	
