= 1960–61 North-South Cup =

Tournament details
- Country: Northern Ireland; Republic of Ireland
- Teams: 8

Final positions
- Champions: (Northern Ireland) Linfield
- Runners-up: (Northern Ireland) Glentoran

Tournament statistics
- Matches played: 14
- Goals scored: 55 (3.93 per match)

The 1960–61 North-South Cup was the 1st edition of the North-South Cup, an association football cup competition featuring teams from Northern Ireland and the Republic of Ireland.

Linfield won the competition, defeating Glentoran 7–1 on aggregate in the two-legged final. Due to fixture congestion, the final was not held until the 1961–62 season.

== Results ==
Teams that were at home in the first leg listed on the left.

=== Quarter-finals ===
Team 1	Agg.	Team 2	1st leg	2nd leg
Distillery (Northern Ireland)	1–5	(Republic of Ireland) Drumcondra	0–2	1–3
Glentoran (Northern Ireland)	6–3	(Republic of Ireland) St Patrick's Athletic	3–1	3–2
Shamrock Rovers (Republic of Ireland)	2–4	(Northern Ireland) Glenavon	0–2	2–2
Shelbourne (Republic of Ireland)	4–5	(Northern Ireland) Linfield	2–2	2–3

=== Semi-finals ===
Teams that were at home in the first leg listed on the left.

Team 1	Agg.	Team 2	1st leg	2nd leg
Glentoran (Northern Ireland)	5–4	(Republic of Ireland) Drumcondra	5–2	0–2
Linfield (Northern Ireland)	5–4	(Northern Ireland) Glenavon	3–3	2–1

=== Final ===
30 January 1962

Linfield (Northern Ireland)	0–0	(Northern Ireland) Glentoran
	Report

Windsor Park, Belfast
5 February 1962

Glentoran (Northern Ireland)	1–7	(Northern Ireland) Linfield
M. Doherty 22'	Report	Reid 10'; Braithwaite 11', 58'; Stewart 17'; Wilson 43'; Dickson 48', 81'

Grosvenor Park, Belfast

Linfield win 7–1 on aggregate.
