= Isaac McDowell =

Scottish footballer and manager

Personal information
- Full name: Isaac McCandlish McDowell
- Place of birth: Glasgow, Scotland
- Position: Inside right

Senior career*
Years	Team	Apps	(Gls)
- Dunoon Athletic
- Glasgow Perthshire
- Airdrieonians
- Dumbarton
- King's Park
1938–1940	Cowdenbeath		
1944–1946	Port Vale	0	(0)
1946–1947	Cowdenbeath		
1947–1948	Coleraine		
1948–1951	Linfield		
1951–1953	Ards		
- Linfield

Managerial career
- 1951–1953: Ards
- 1960–1962: Linfield
- 1962–1964: Glentoran
- * Club domestic league appearances and goals

Isaac McCandlish McDowell was a Scottish footballer and football manager who played as an inside-right for Dunoon Athletic, Glasgow Perthshire, Airdrieonians, Dumbarton, King's Park, Cowdenbeath, Port Vale, Coleraine, Linfield, and Ards. He later managed Ards, Linfield and Glentoran.

== Playing career ==
McDowell played for Dunoon Athletic, Glasgow Perthshire, Airdrieonians, Dumbarton, King's Park, and Cowdenbeath, before he joined English club Port Vale – initially as a guest player during World War II – in October 1944. He made his debut in a 4–1 defeat to Leicester City at Filbert Street in a Football League North match on 21 October. He became a regular in the first team and scored eight goals in 36 wartime matches and three goals in four FA Cup games before he departed in January 1946 after being "directed to undertake essential work in Scotland".

== Management career ==
McDowell managed Ards from 1951 to 1953. He managed Linfield from 1960 to 1962. He led the club to seven trophies in the 1961–62 season: the Irish League championship, Irish Cup, County Antrim Shield, Gold Cup, City Cup, Ulster Cup, and the North-South Cup. They could have won an eighth trophy, but failed to win the Irish Intermediate Cup. They had finished level on points with Portadown in the league. Still, they beat Portadown 3–1 in a play-off match to claim the title. Forward Bobby Braithwaite later recalled that "Isaac McDowell kept us focused on each game and I recall that it was only after Portadown drew with the Glens [Glentoran] to set up a play-off match for the title that we realised what we could possibly achieve". They won the County Antrim Shield by beating Glentoran 5–0 in the final. McDowell went on to manage Glentoran from 1962 to 1964. In December 2006, the Belfast Telegraph reported that he died in South Africa "a few years ago".

== Career statistics ==
Appearances and goals by club, season and competition
Club	Season	League			FA Cup		Total	
Club	Season	Division	Apps	Goals	Apps	Goals	Apps	Goals
Port Vale	1945–46	–	0	0	4	3	4	3

== Honours ==
Linfield

- Irish League: 1961–62
- Irish Cup: 1961–62
- County Antrim Shield: 1961–62
- Gold Cup: 1961–62
- City Cup: 1961–62
- Ulster Cup: 1961–62
- North-South Cup: 1961–62
