= List of footballers with 500 or more goals =

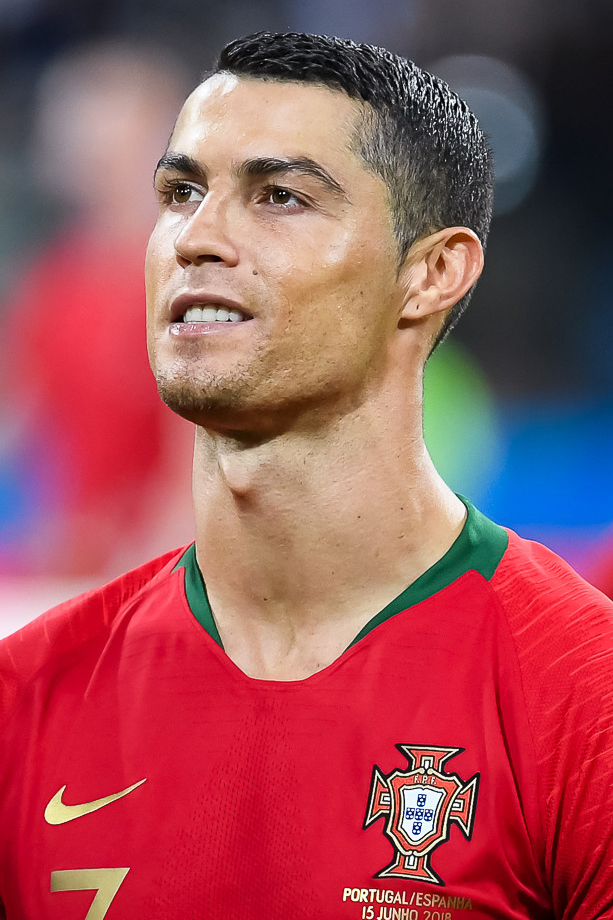
With over 980 goals for club and country combined, Cristiano Ronaldo is the top goalscorer of all time.

In top-level association football competitions, 27 players have scored 500 or more goals in both club and international football, according to research by the IFFHS, first published in 2007. Taking into account competitions of all levels, 82 players have reached the milestone, according to the RSSSF. FIFA, the international governing body of football, has never released a list detailing the highest goalscorers and does not keep official records. It is challenging for statisticians and media to agree on which goals should be counted, with debate over whether to include those scored in friendlies, regional competitions, and even matches taking place during wartime. Hungarian Imre Schlosser is generally recognised as the first to reach the 500-goal mark, doing so in 1927 shortly before his retirement. Nine players have accomplished the feat at a single club: Josef Bican (Slavia Prague), Jimmy Jones (Glenavon), Jimmy McGrory (Celtic), Joe Bambrick (Linfield), Lionel Messi (Barcelona), Gerd Müller (Bayern Munich), Pelé (Santos), Fernando Peyroteo (Sporting Lisbon), and Uwe Seeler (Hamburg). Of these nine, Messi scored the most, with 672 goals between his debut in 2004 and his departure in 2021.

In 2020, FIFA recognised Josef Bican, an Austrian-Czech dual international who played between the 1930s and the 1950s, as the record scorer with an estimated 805 goals, although CNN, the BBC, France 24, and O Jogo all acknowledge that Bican's tally includes goals scored for reserve teams and in unofficial international matches. UEFA, the governing body for European football, ranks him as the leading all-time goalscorer in European top-flight leagues with 518 goals, narrowly ahead of Hungarian Ferenc Puskás. RSSSF credits Bican with 948 goals, a tally which includes goals scored in winter tournaments, as well as when selected to represent regional and city teams, and the Football Association of the Czech Republic claims a total of 821. Spanish newspapers Marca and Sport state that both Bican and Pelé scored 762 goals. Bican once walked out of a gala held in his honour by the IFFHS after the organisation had excluded war-time goals from his tally, although it later recognised the 229 goals he had scored during the period.

Media outlets like Sky Sports, ESPN, and Globo Esporte argue that for Pelé and his era, friendly matches were important and their goals should count, while journalist Hugh McIlvanney called them "profit-making excursions" with little "relevance to Pelé's reality", and Jonathan Liew said many friendlies were "against up-country teams or down-at-heel invitational sides". When Argentinian forward Lionel Messi was reported to have broken the record for most goals at a single club (644 for Barcelona), Pelé's former club Santos denied it, saying 448 of Pelé's friendly goals had been uncounted, arguing many were against "the best teams of all time", a point Pelé supported by updating his tally to 1,283 on Instagram. Barcelona responded that because Bican, Pelé, Erwin Helmchen, and Abe Lenstra scored mostly in leagues below national level, those goals should not count, and goals from wartime matches, lower tiers, and regional divisions by players like Bican, Ferenc Deák, Puskás, Seeler, Müller, Túlio Maravilha, and Robert Lewandowski are also disputed.

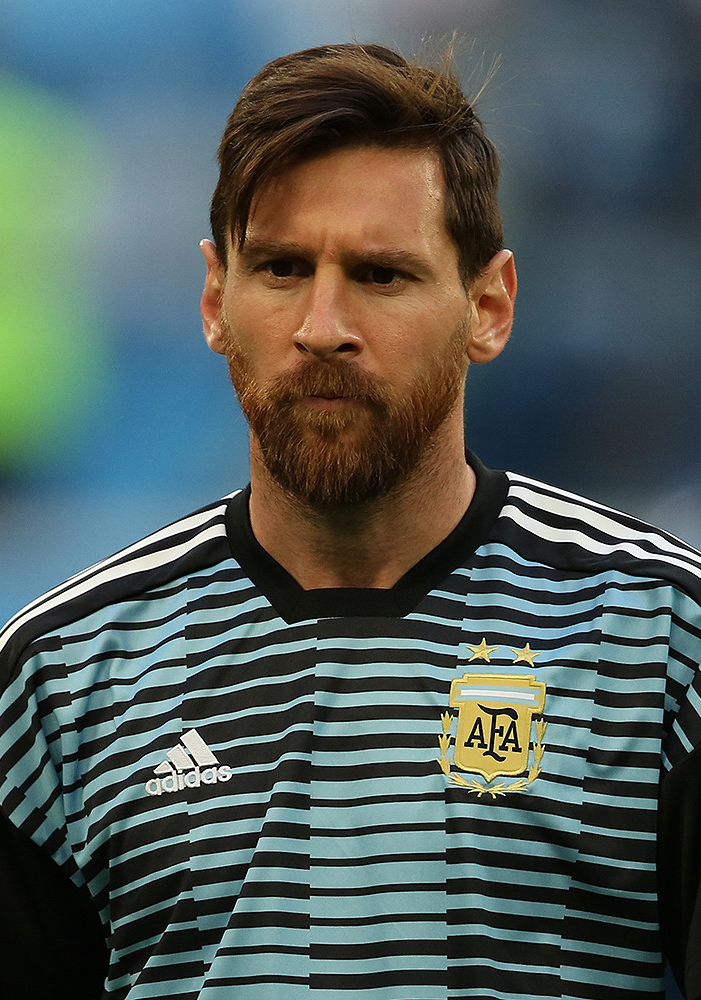
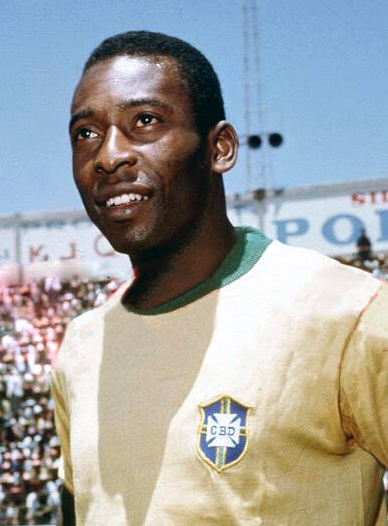
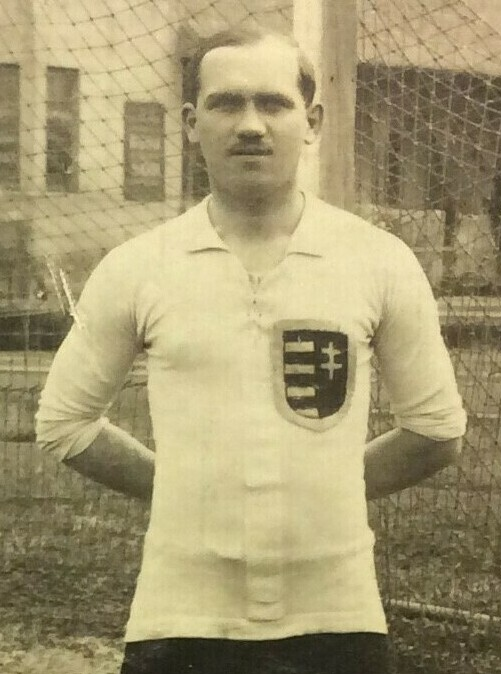
Lionel Messi (left) has scored the most goals for one club, with 672 goals for Barcelona. Pelé (center) held the world record for most goals for roughly 45 years, while Imre Schlosser was the first footballer to score 500 goals.

In 2021, Portuguese forward Cristiano Ronaldo was reported to have broken the record by scoring his 760th goal, although it was widely accepted as impossible to confirm with certainty since stats from earlier eras are often disputed, as observed by journalist Jonathan Wilson and Corriere dello Sport editor Ivan Zazzaroni, who said German striker Helmchen may have scored 981 goals. Ronaldo said "the world has changed since then and football has changed as well, but this doesn't mean we can just erase history according to our interests." Other claims exist; Guinness World Records credits Pelé with the "most career goals" at 1,279, and Brazilian striker Romário claimed his 1,000th goal in 2007 but later admitted it included friendlies; they are reported to have scored 767 and 772 goals respectively, with Pelé's total including one goal for the military team and nine for the state team of São Paulo at the State Team Championship. The Encyclopædia Britannica observes that Brazilian Arthur Friedenreich is "officially recognised" by FIFA to have scored 1,329 goals, although there is little evidence. In March 2022, Ronaldo surpassed Bican's estimated 805 goals. In 2024, Ronaldo stated his intent to become the first player to reach 1,000 career goals before his retirement, a feat regularly questioned by media.

== Footballers with 500 or more goals ==
According to the IFFHS and other media outlets, 27 male players are credited with scoring 500 or more goals in top-level professional football competitions:

As of 20 November 2026.

Bold indicates players currently active.
* indicates player has scored at least 500 goals for a single club.

Rank	Player	Club			Country and other	Total	Career span
Rank	Player	League	Cup	Continental	Country and other	Total	Career span
1	(Portugal) **Cristiano Ronaldo**	609 (Note: Played club football for Sporting CP, Manchester United, Real Madrid, Juventus, and Al-Nassr.)	57	174	146	**986** (Note: Cristiano Ronaldo references:)	2002–present
2	(Argentina) **Lionel Messi***	579 (Note: Played club football for Barcelona, Paris Saint-Germain, and Inter Miami.)	71	161	126	**937** (Note: Lionel Messi references:)	2004–present
3	(Brazil) Pelé*	604 (Note: Played club football for Santos and New York Cosmos.)	49	26	83	**762**	1957–1977
4	(Brazil) Romário	545 (Note: Played club football for Vasco da Gama, PSV Eindhoven, Barcelona, Flamengo, Valencia, Fluminense, Al Sadd, Miami FC, Adelaide United, and America.)	93	54	64	**756**	1985–2007
5	(Hungary) (Spain) Ferenc Puskás	516 (Note: Played club football for Budapest Honvéd and Real Madrid.)	69	56	84	**725**	1943–1966
6	(Austria) (Czechoslovakia) Josef Bican*	515 (Note: Played club football for Rapid Wien, Admira Vienna, Slavia Prague, FC Vítkovice, Hradec Králové, Dynamo Prague, Slovan Liberec, and Spartak Brno ZJŠ.)	137	38	32	**722**	1931–1955
7	(Poland) **Robert Lewandowski**	436 (Note: Played club football for Lech Poznań, Borussia Dortmund, Bayern Munich, Barcelona, and Chicago Fire.)	62	120	92	**710** (Note: Robert Lewandowski references:)	2008–present
8	(Northern Ireland) Jimmy Jones*	330 (Note: Played club football for Belfast Celtic, Glenavon, Portadown, and Bangor.)	286	14	9	**639**	1947–1964
9	(West Germany) Gerd Müller*	405 (Note: Played club football for Bayern Munich and Fort Lauderdale Strikers.)	92	69	68	**634**	1964–1981
10	(Northern Ireland) Joe Bambrick*	347 (Note: Played club football for Glentoran, Linfield, Chelsea, and Walsall.)	253	5	21	**626**	1926–1943
11	(Netherlands) Abe Lenstra	573 (Note: Played club football for Heerenveen, SC Enschede, and Enschedese Boys.)	18	0	33	**624**	1936–1963
12	(Uruguay) **Luis Suárez**	436 (Note: Played club football for Nacional, Groningen, Ajax, Liverpool, Barcelona, Atlético Madrid, Grêmio, and Inter Miami.)	48	64	69	**617** (Note: Luis Suárez references:)	2005–present
13	(Portugal) Eusébio	381 (Note: Played club football for Sporting Lourenço Marques, Benfica, Boston Minutemen, Monterrey, Toronto Metros-Croatia, Beira-Mar, Las Vegas Quicksilvers, União de Tomar, and New Jersey Americans.)	97	59	41	**578**	1960–1978
14	(Northern Ireland) Glenn Ferguson	313 (Note: Played club football for Ards, Glenavon, Linfield, and Lisburn Distillery.)	241	9	0	**563**	1987–2011
15	(Sweden) Zlatan Ibrahimović	394 (Note: Played club football for Malmö FF, Ajax, Juventus, Inter Milan, Barcelona, Milan, Paris Saint-Germain, Manchester United, and LA Galaxy.)	48	57	62	**561**	1999–2023
16	(Hungary) Imre Schlosser	413 (Note: Played club football for Ferencváros, MTK Hungária, Wiener AC, and Budai 33.)	68	13	59	**553**	1906–1928
16	(Portugal) Fernando Peyroteo*	464 (Note: Played club football for Sporting CP.)	72	3	14	**553**	1937–1949
18	(West Germany) Uwe Seeler*	447 (Note: Played club football for Hamburger SV and Cork Celtic.)	41	21	43	**552**	1954–1978
19	(Scotland) Jimmy McGrory*	407 (Note: Played club football for Celtic and Clydebank.)	131	0	12	**550**	1923–1937
20	(Argentina) (Spain) Alfredo Di Stéfano	378 (Note: Played club football for River Plate, Huracán, Millonarios, Real Madrid, and Espanyol.)	54	76	29	**537**	1945–1966
21	(Hungary) György Sárosi	350 (Note: Played club football for Ferencváros.)	35	103	42	**530**	1931–1948
22	(England) **Harry Kane**	315 (Note: Played club football for Tottenham Hotspur, Norwich City, and Bayern Munich.)	36	85	93	**529** (Note: Harry Kane references:)	2011–present
23	(France) **Karim Benzema**	329 (Note: Played club football for Lyon, Real Madrid, Al-Ittihad, and Al-Hilal.)	53	105	37	**524** (Note: Karim Benzema references:)	2005–present
24	(Brazil) Roberto Dinamite	476 (Note: Played club football for Vasco da Gama, Barcelona, Portuguesa, and Campo Grande.)	10	5	22	**513**	1971–1992
25	(Mexico) Hugo Sánchez	390 (Note: Played club football for Pumas UNAM, San Diego Sockers, Atlético Madrid, Real Madrid, América, Rayo Vallecano, Atlante, Linz, Dallas Burn, and Atlético Celaya.)	49	38	29	**506**	1976–1997
26	(Austria) Franz Binder	297 (Note: Played club football for Rapid Wien.)	93	87	26	**503**	1930–1949
27	(Brazil) Zico	410 (Note: Played club football for Flamengo, Udinese, and Kashima Antlers.)	27	16	48	**501**	1971–1994

== RSSSF list ==
As the RSSSF uses different methodology from that of the IFFHS and other media outlets to determine which goals to include, 82 male players are credited with scoring 500 or more goals in matches taking into account competitions at all levels:

As of 19 July 2026.
Bold indicates players currently active.
+ indicates player may have scored and played more.

Rank	Player	Goals	Matches	Ratio	Career span
1	(Portugal) **Cristiano Ronaldo**	994	1,366	0.73	2002–present
2	(West Germany) Erwin Helmchen	989+	582	1.7	1924–1951
3	(Austria) (Czechoslovakia) Josef Bican	950+	624	1.52	1930–1957
4	(Argentina) **Lionel Messi**	948	1,220	0.78	2003–present
5	(England) Ronnie Rooke	940+	1,035	0.91	1929–1961
6	(Northern Ireland) Jimmy Jones	840+	760	1.11	1943–1965
7	(Hungary) (Spain) Ferenc Puskás	802	792	1.01	1943–1967
8	(Hungary) Ferenc Deák	795+	515	1.54	1939–1959
9	(Netherlands) Abe Lenstra	790+	850	0.93	1936–1964
10	(Brazil) Romário	785	1,003	0.78	1984–2009
11	(Brazil) Pelé	778	851	0.91	1956–1977
12	(Poland) **Robert Lewandowski**	752	1,112	0.68	2004–present
13	(England) Tommy Lawton	749+	833	0.9	1935–1957
14	(West Germany) Gerd Müller	735	793	0.93	1963–1981
15	(Northern Ireland) Sammy Hughes	722+	752	0.96	1942–1963
16	(Northern Ireland) Joe Bambrick	690+	578	1.19	1925–1943
17	(Poland) (Germany) Ernst Wilimowski	683+	484	1.41	1932–1957
18	(England) Tom Waring	672+	736+	0.91	1924–1948
19	(Northern Ireland) Boy Martin	642+	547	1.17	1930–1947
20	(Hungary) Ferenc Bene	634	972	0.65	1959–1985
21	(Portugal) Eusébio	634+	663	0.96	1960–1978
22	(England) Stan Mortensen	628+	822	0.76	1938–1962
23	(Portugal) Fernando Peyroteo	625	380	1.64	1937–1949
24	(England) Joe Smith	617+	903	0.68	1908–1931
25	(Northern Ireland) Frederick Roberts	613+	471	1.3	1922–1937
26	(Uruguay) **Luis Suárez**	612	1,054	0.58	2005–present
27	(Hungary) Gyula Zsengellér	611+	650	0.94	1931–1953
28	(England) Jimmy Greaves	590+	842	0.7	1956–1980
29	(West Germany) Uwe Seeler	586	688	0.85	1954–1972
30	(Germany) Fritz Walter	586+	583	1.01	1938–1959
31	(Brazil) Túlio Maravilha	585	950+	0.62	1987–2014
32	(Sweden) Zlatan Ibrahimović	582	1,001	0.58	1999–2023
33	(England) David Wilson	581+	626	0.93	1927–1947
34	(Northern Ireland) Jimmy Kelly	574+	1,004	0.57	1925–1957
35	(Hungary) Imre Schlosser	570	464	1.23	1906–1928
36	(Northern Ireland) Glenn Ferguson	570	1,085	0.53	1987–2011
37	(Austria) Franz Binder	569+	431	1.32	1927–1949
38	(Scotland) Charlie Fleming	569	766+	0.74	1947–1965
39	(Scotland) Hughie Gallacher	569+	717	0.79	1920–1940
40	(England) Dixie Dean	568	612	0.93	1923–1940
41	(Republic of Ireland) John Aldridge	565+	990	0.57	1976–1998
42	(Spain) Isidro Lángara	564+	458	1.23	1930–1948
43	(Mexico) Hugo Sánchez	562	956	0.59	1974–1998
44	(Portugal) José Torres	561	615	0.91	1958–1980
45	(France) **Karim Benzema**	558	1,049	0.53	2004–present
46	(Scotland) Jimmy McGrory	558	549	1.02	1922–1938
47	(Hungary) Sándor Kocsis	556	538	1.03	1946–1966
48	(Belgium) Paul Dechamps	552+	612	0.9	1939–1964
49	(Scotland) Dave Halliday	551+	642	0.86	1920–1938
50	(Scotland) Jimmy Smith	550+	521	1.06	1928–1947
51	(Brazil) Zico	546	798	0.68	1971–1994
52	(England) **Harry Kane**	545	809	0.67	2010–present
53	(Hungary) Ferenc Szusza	545	600	0.91	1940–1961
54	(Scotland) Jock Dodds	542	614	0.88	1932–1950
55	(Hungary) József Takács	542	528	1.03	1920–1942
56	(Northern Ireland) Tommy Dickson	539+	775	0.7	1946–1966
57	(Germany) Otto Harder	538+	324+	1.66	1910–1934
58	(England) Dennis Westcott	535+	587	0.91	1933–1954
59	(Belgium) Joseph Mermans	528	652	0.81	1937–1960
60	(Scotland) Hughie Ferguson	525+	559	0.94	1914–1930
61	(Argentina) (Spain) Alfredo Di Stéfano	524	720	0.73	1945–1966
62	(Hungary) Nándor Hidegkuti	523	674	0.78	1938–1958
63	(Northern Ireland) Des Dickson	523+	715	0.73	1964–1983
64	(Austria) Hans Krankl	522	727	0.72	1970–1989
65	(Sweden) Gunnar Nordahl	520+	602	0.86	1936–1961
66	(Brazil) Roberto Dinamite	519	869	0.6	1971–1992
67	(England) W. G. Richardson	518+	622	0.83	1928–1946
68	(England) George Brown	517+	711+	0.73	1920–1938
69	(Northern Ireland) Trevor Thompson	513+	588	0.87	1955–1969
70	(Italy) Giorgio Chinaglia	512+	710	0.72	1962–1990
71	(Scotland) David McLean	511+	801	0.64	1906–1931
72	(Hungary) György Sárosi	511	607	0.84	1928–1948
73	(England) George Camsell	509+	593	0.86	1923–1942
74	(England) Arthur Rowley	508+	744	0.68	1941–1967
75	(Romania) (Hungary) István Avar	507+	449	1.13	1922–1949
76	(England) Raich Carter	506+	843	0.6	1928–1953
77	(England) Steve Bloomer	505	757	0.67	1891–1920
78	(Northern Ireland) Dennis Guy	504+	631	0.8	1960–1976
79	(Netherlands) Willy van der Kuijlen	504	807	0.62	1962–1983
80	(Belgium) Albert de Cleyn	503	588	0.86	1933–1955
81	(Argentina) Delio Onnis	502	747	0.67	1966–1986
82	(Hungary) Lajos Tichy	500	628	0.8	1952–1971

== See also ==
- List of top international men's football goalscorers by country
- List of men's footballers with 100 or more international caps
- List of men's footballers with 50 or more international goals
- List of men's footballers with the most official appearances
- List of footballers who achieved hat-trick records
- List of world association football records
- List of goalscoring goalkeepers
- Lists of hat-tricks in football
