= 1995–96 County Antrim Shield =

Tournament details
- Country: Northern Ireland
- Teams: 16

Final positions
- Champions: Glenavon (2nd win)
- Runners-up: Crusaders

Tournament statistics
- Matches played: 15
- Goals scored: 53 (3.53 per match)

The 1995–96 County Antrim Shield was the 107th edition of the County Antrim Shield, a cup competition in Northern Irish football.

Glenavon won the tournament for the 2nd time, defeating Crusaders 3–0 in the final. For the 10th year running three clubs from County Armagh competed (Glenavon, Newry Town and Portadown).

== Results ==
=== First round ===
Team 1	Score	Team 2
Bangor	3–5	Ballymena United
Carrick Rangers	2–2 (a.e.t.) (4–3 p)	Cliftonville
Crusaders	1–0	Linfield
Distillery	1–3	Ards
Glenavon	5–0	Dundela
Larne	3–2	Ballyclare Comrades
Newry Town	1–4	Glentoran
Portadown	1–0	Dromara Village

=== Quarter-finals ===
Team 1	Score	Team 2
Ards	0–1	Crusaders
Carrick Rangers	0–4	Portadown
Glentoran	1–2	Ballymena United
Larne	0–2	Glenavon

=== Semi-finals ===
Team 1	Score	Team 2
Crusaders	2–0	Ballymena United
Portadown	1–4	Glenavon

=== Final ===
30 January 1996

Glenavon	3–0	Crusaders
McBride 22', 79'; McKeown 32' (o.g.)

The Oval, Belfast
Referee: David Magill (Belfast)
