= Tommy Dickson =

Northern Irish footballer

Personal information
- Full name: Thomas Arneill Dickson
- Date of birth: 16 July 1929
- Place of birth: Belfast, Northern Ireland
- Date of death: 31 December 2007 (aged 78)
- Place of death: Belfast, Northern Ireland
- Position: Striker

Youth career
- Roosevelt Street Boys Club

Senior career*
| Years | Team | Apps | (Gls) |
| 1947–1948 | Brantwood | | |
| 1948–1965 | Linfield | 653 | (451) |
| 1965 | Glentoran | 8 | (3) |

International career
| 1950–1963 | Irish League XI | 21 | (8) |
| 1956 | Northern Ireland | 1 | (0) |
- * Club domestic league appearances and goals

Thomas Arneill Dickson (16 July 1929 – 31 December 2007) was a Northern Irish international footballer who most notably played with Linfield from 1948 to 1965. He played 660 times for Linfield, scoring 454 goals. He has been cited as one of the greatest Irish League players of all time. His popularity among Linfield fans led to him being nicknamed The Duke of Windsor.

== Club career ==
Dickson began his youth career with Roosevelt Street Boys Club, before moving to the Irish Intermediate League in 1947 to join Brantwood as an amateur. After a fine season he was approached by Elisha Scott to play for Belfast Celtic, however Dickson - a lifelong Linfield supporter - turned him down.

After beginning his senior career with reserve side Linfield Swifts, he spent sixteen seasons in the Linfield first team, winning eight Irish League titles and five Irish Cups among many other achievements. In the 1961–62 season, he led Linfield to an amazing seven trophy wins over the course of the season. Feats such as this led to interest from cross-channel clubs such as Rangers and Hull City, the latter of whom made a bid of £8,000 which was rejected by Linfield as it did not meet their £10,000 valuation of the player.

For a spell in the early-sixties Dickson operated as Linfield's player-coach, and was responsible for team selection (but not transfer policy). After Linfield dramatically announced that Dickson would not be retained for the 1965–66 season, he shockingly signed for their biggest rivals Glentoran. However, after just nine appearances and three goals with the east Belfast club, his appetite for the game diminished and he retired. In 1966, Linfield presented him with a life membership.

He died aged 78 on 31 December 2007.

== International career ==
In the 1955–56 season, he captained the Irish League to a famous 5–2 victory over the Football League, scoring two goals in the game. He also earned one cap for Northern Ireland, against Scotland in 1956.

== Style of play ==
Mural in Belfast, 2025

His qualities as a footballer lay in his creativity, vision and skill which allowed more goalscoring opportunities for the team as a whole, as well as himself.

Although Dickson never actually topped the Irish League's goalscoring charts in a particular season, his unerring strike rate and longevity have ensured a place in the top-five all-time list of Irish League goalscorers.

== Legacy ==
Dickson was beloved at Windsor Park and was so revered that he was known to Linfield supporters as "The Duke of Windsor." In 2011, he was named as the greatest Linfield player of all time by the Belfast Telegraph. The year after his death, a mural was painted in his honour in Taughmonagh, south Belfast.

== Honours ==
Linfield

- Irish League (8): 1949–50, 1952–53, 1954–55, 1955–56, 1958–59, 1959–60, 1960–61, 1961–62
- Irish Cup (5): 1949–50, 1952–53, 1959–60, 1961–62, 1962–63
- Gold Cup (8): 1949–50, 1950–51, 1955–56, 1957–58, 1959–60, 1961–62, 1962–63, 1963–64
- Ulster Cup (3): 1955–56, 1959–60, 1961–62
- City Cup (6): 1949–50, 1951–52, 1957–58, 1958–59, 1961–62, 1963–64
- County Antrim Shield (7): 1952–53, 1954–55, 1957–58, 1958–59, 1960–61, 1961–62, 1962–63
- North-South Cup (1): 1961–62

Linfield Swifts

- Irish Intermediate Cup (1): 1948–49
- Steel & Sons Cup (1): 1948–49

Brantwood

- Irish Intermediate League (1): 1947–48
- Clements Lyttle Cup (1): 1947–48

Individual

- Ulster Footballer of the Year (1): 1962–63

== See also ==
- List of men's footballers with 500 or more goals
- Ulster Footballer of the Year
