= 1961–62 Irish League =

Irish League
- Season: 1961–62
- Champions: Linfield; 26th Irish title
- Matches played: 132
- Goals scored: 523 (3.96 per match)
- Top goalscorer: Mick Lynch (20 goals)

Location of teams in the Irish League from 1949–1972
Location of Belfast-based teams in the Irish League from 1949–1971

The 1961–62 Irish League was the 61st edition of the Irish League, the highest level of league competition in Northern Irish football. The league consisted of 12 teams, and Linfield won the championship after a 3-1 playoff win over Portadown.

== League standings ==
Pos	Team	Pld	W	D	L	GF	GA	GR	Pts	Qualification
1	Linfield (C)	22	14	3	5	62	32	1.938	31	Qualification for the European Cup preliminary round
2	Portadown	22	14	3	5	56	32	1.750	31	Qualification for the European Cup Winners' Cup first round
3	Ballymena United	22	11	7	4	47	32	1.469	29	
4	Ards	22	11	5	6	46	38	1.211	27	
5	Glenavon	22	9	8	5	62	43	1.442	26	
6	Crusaders	22	11	3	8	42	43	0.977	25	
7	Glentoran	22	10	5	7	45	35	1.286	25	
8	Distillery	22	8	4	10	56	62	0.903	20	
9	Coleraine	22	7	4	11	37	39	0.949	18	
10	Derry City	22	3	8	11	22	38	0.579	14	
11	Bangor	22	5	3	14	31	56	0.554	13	
12	Cliftonville	22	0	5	17	17	73	0.233	5	

Source: rsssf.com
(C) Champions

== Results ==
Home \ Away	ARD	BAN	BLM	CLI	COL	CRU	DIS	DER	GLV	GLT	LIN	POR
Ards		1–1	1–1	5–1	3–2	4–1	3–1	2–0	4–3	4–2	2–4	2–1
Bangor	2–0		0–4	2–0	1–3	3–2	4–5	3–3	1–3	4–1	0–1	2–6
Ballymena United	1–2	2–1		7–0	1–1	1–1	3–2	2–0	3–3	1–1	4–2	1–3
Cliftonville	1–3	0–0	1–3		0–0	1–2	4–5	2–2	1–1	1–2	0–5	0–4
Coleraine	0–1	4–0	0–1	2–1		4–1	2–3	4–2	1–2	1–1	2–0	1–1
Crusaders	3–0	3–0	1–2	6–0	3–1		2–1	1–0	1–3	1–0	3–2	3–4
Distillery	2–2	2–4	1–4	6–0	4–2	2–3		2–3	2–2	4–3	4–6	2–1
Derry City	0–0	1–0	0–0	5–0	0–1	1–1	2–2		2–2	0–1	0–2	0–1
Glenavon	5–2	5–2	2–2	2–2	7–2	1–1	5–1	4–0		2–3	2–1	3–4
Glentoran	1–0	2–0	1–2	6–0	2–1	0–1	3–0	5–1	4–4		1–1	2–2
Linfield	3–2	4–1	6–1	3–1	4–3	9–0	2–2	0–0	2–0	3–1		2–1
Portadown	3–3	4–0	3–1	2–1	1–0	4–2	2–3	3–0	2–1	2–3	2–0	

Source: Irish League Archive
Legend: Blue = home team win; Yellow = draw; Red = away team win.

=== Test match ===
17 May 1962

Linfield	3–1	Portadown

Solitude, Belfast

== Top scorers (including play-off) ==
Pos	Player	Club	Pld	Goals
1	Mick Lynch	Ards	22	20
2	Eamon Gorman	Portadown	23	19
=	Joe Meldrum	Distillery	21	19
4	Billy Johnston	Glenavon	19	18
=	Trevor Thompson	Glentoran	21	18
6	Tommy Dickson	Linfield	22	17
=	Jimmy Jones	Glenavon	20	17
=	Jimmy Small	Ballymena United	17	17
9	Ken Hamilton	Distillery	22	16
10	Hugh Barr	Linfield	18	12
=	Roy Torrens	Derry City	19	12
=	Jim Weatherup	Crusaders	22	12
