= 1990–91 County Antrim Shield =

Tournament details
- Country: Northern Ireland
- Teams: 16

Final positions
- Champions: Glenavon (1st win)
- Runners-up: Newry Town

Tournament statistics
- Matches played: 15
- Goals scored: 52 (3.47 per match)

The 1990–91 County Antrim Shield was the 102nd edition of the County Antrim Shield, a cup competition in Northern Irish football.

Glenavon won the tournament for the 1st time, defeating Newry Town 4–3 in the final. For the 5th year running the County Antrim FA invited three clubs from County Armagh to compete (Glenavon, Newry Town and Portadown).

== Results ==
=== First round ===
Team 1	Score	Team 2
Ards	1–0	Cliftonville
Ballymena United	3–3 (a.e.t.) (1–4 p)	RUC
Distillery	1–4	Dundela
Glenavon	4–2	Linfield
Glentoran	1–0	Bangor
Larne	2–1	Crusaders
Newry Town	3–1	Carrick Rangers
Portadown	3–0	Ballyclare Comrades

=== Quarter-finals ===
Team 1	Score	Team 2
Ards	0–1	Dundela
Larne	1–2	Glenavon
Newry Town	3–1	Glentoran
Portadown	2–0	RUC

=== Semi-finals ===
Team 1	Score	Team 2
Glenavon	1–1 (a.e.t.) (4–3 p)	Portadown
Newry Town	3–1	Dundela

=== Final ===
11 May 1991

Glenavon	4–3	Newry Town
McCoy 12'; Bustard 20'; McBride 22'; Ferguson 71'	Report	Hawkins 43' (pen.); Ralph 82'; White 84'

New Grosvenor Stadium, Ballyskeagh
