= 1947–48 Irish League =

Irish League
- Season: 1947–48
- Champions: Belfast Celtic; 14th Irish title
- Matches played: 132
- Goals scored: 521 (3.95 per match)
- Top goalscorer: Jimmy Jones (28 goals)

Location of teams in the 1947–48 Irish League
Location of Belfast-based teams in the 1947–48 Irish League

The 1947–48 Irish League was the 47th edition of the Irish League, the highest level of league competition in Northern Irish football. The league comprised 12 teams, and Belfast Celtic won the championship.

== League standings ==
Pos	Team	Pld	W	D	L	GF	GA	GR	Pts	Result
1	Belfast Celtic (C)	22	19	1	2	84	26	3.231	39	Champions
2	Linfield	22	15	5	2	55	19	2.895	35	
3	Ballymena United	22	10	7	5	52	38	1.368	27	
4	Distillery	22	12	2	8	35	32	1.094	26	
5	Glentoran	22	9	8	5	44	29	1.517	26	
6	Coleraine	22	8	6	8	48	46	1.043	22	
7	Glenavon	22	8	6	8	45	45	1.000	22	
8	Ards	22	7	4	11	37	54	0.685	18	
9	Cliftonville	22	7	4	11	36	47	0.766	18	
10	Bangor	22	6	4	12	36	55	0.655	16	
11	Portadown	22	3	3	16	31	60	0.517	9	
12	Derry City	22	2	2	18	18	70	0.257	6	

Source: rsssf.com
(C) Champions

== Results ==
Home \ Away	ARD	BAN	BLM	BCE	CLI	COL	DIS	DER	GLV	GLT	LIN	POR
Ards		1–2	2–2	2–5	1–3	3–2	1–2	4–1	2–4	1–1	2–1	3–0
Bangor	1–2		3–7	2–5	1–1	2–2	3–2	4–0	2–5	2–3	1–4	1–3
Ballymena United	0–1	2–0		4–3	5–2	3–2	2–1	6–0	4–2	1–1	1–2	5–2
Belfast Celtic	6–0	3–2	2–0		3–0	5–2	5–0	5–1	3–1	0–0	3–0	6–2
Cliftonville	3–4	2–3	1–1	2–4		0–1	2–0	3–0	3–3	2–1	0–0	2–1
Coleraine	1–1	3–0	4–0	1–8	4–0		0–2	3–0	2–2	2–2	1–2	5–2
Distillery	2–0	3–1	2–2	0–2	3–0	0–2		2–0	2–0	2–2	0–4	1–0
Derry City	6–2	0–2	1–1	1–5	1–3	2–5	0–2		1–2	2–3	0–7	1–0
Glenavon	1–1	1–1	1–2	1–3	3–2	2–2	0–2	4–0		0–5	1–1	5–1
Glentoran	4–1	4–0	2–2	1–3	3–1	3–0	0–2	4–0	1–3		0–2	1–1
Linfield	3–1	1–1	3–1	3–1	3–1	2–2	4–1	2–0	4–1	1–1		3–0
Portadown	4–2	1–2	1–1	1–4	2–3	5–2	2–4	1–1	1–3	1–2	0–3	

Source: Irish League Archive
Legend: Blue = home team win; Yellow = draw; Red = away team win.
