= Eddie Davies (footballer) =

English footballer (1923–1995)

Personal information
- Full name: Edward Davies
- Date of birth: 3 May 1923
- Place of birth: Burslem, Stoke-on-Trent, England
- Date of death: 26 March 1995 (aged 71)
- Place of death: Herne Bay, Kent, England
- Position: Centre-forward

Senior career*
Years	Team	Apps	(Gls)
1943–1946	Port Vale	3	(0)
1946–1947	Witton Albion		
1947–1960	Herne Bay		
- * Club domestic league appearances and goals

Edward Davies (3 May 1923 – 26 March 1995) was an English footballer who played at centre-forward for Port Vale, Witton Albion, and Herne Bay.

== Career ==
Davies joined Port Vale in January 1943 but was shortly guesting for Chelsea as Vale were in abeyance because of the war. His Vale debut finally came on 1 December 1945 in a 2–1 win at Macclesfield Town. He scored three goals in his next four games before breaking his leg in January 1946. He recovered to play three Football League Third Division South games at the Old Recreation Ground the next season, but was transferred to Witton Albion in November 1946 by new "Valiants" boss Gordon Hodgson. He made his Witton debut on 20 November and scored two goals in his four games for the club. Later he played for Herne Bay. A prolific scorer at Herne Bay, he set the club's record for most goals in a season with 62. He was well known for his extremely hard head and ability to head the ball harder than most strikers could kick it. Davies retired in the 1959–60 season.

== Career statistics ==
Appearances and goals by club, season and competition
Club	Season	League			FA Cup		Total	
Club	Season	Division	Apps	Goals	Apps	Goals	Apps	Goals
Port Vale	1945–46	–	0	0	2	0	2	0
Port Vale	1946–47	Third Division South	3	0	0	0	3	0
Port Vale	Total		3	0	2	0	5	0
Witton Albion	1946–47	Cheshire County League					4	2
