= Fred Gardner (cricketer) =

English cricketer and footballer (1922-1979)

Personal information
- Full name: Fred Charles Gardner
- Date of birth: 4 June 1922
- Place of birth: Bell Green, Coventry, England
- Date of death: 12 January 1979 (aged 56)
- Place of death: Coventry, England
- Position: Inside forward

Senior career*
| Years | Team | Apps | (Gls) |
| 1940–1946 | Birmingham | 0 | (0) |
| 1946–1949 | Coventry City | 13 | (3) |
| 1949–1950 | Newport County | 4 | (2) |
- Rugby Town
| Total | | 17+ | (5+) |
- * Club domestic league appearances and goals

Fred Gardner
Cricket information
- Batting: Right-handed

Domestic team information
- Years: Team
- 1947–1961: Warwickshire

Career statistics
| Competition | First-class |
|---|---|
| Matches | 340 |
| Runs scored | 17,905 |
| Batting average | 33.71 |
| 100s/50s | 29/89 |
| Top score | 215* |
| Balls bowled | 107 |
| Wickets | 0 |
| Bowling average | – |
| 5 wickets in innings | – |
| 10 wickets in match | – |
| Best bowling | – |
| Catches/stumpings | 198/0 |
- Source: Cricinfo, 15 November 2019

Fred Charles Gardner (4 June 1922 – 12 January 1979) was an English first-class cricketer and footballer. As a footballer, he played inside-forward for Birmingham, Coventry City, Newport County, and Rugby Town. He was a right-hand opening batsman in his cricket career who played for Warwickshire.

== Football career ==
Gardner was playing for Birmingham when World War II came to Europe. He guested for Port Vale in 1946. He signed with Coventry City after the war, and scored three goals in 13 league games for the "Bantams" as the Second Division club posted mid-table finishes in 1946–47, 1947–48, and 1948–49 under the stewardship of Billy Frith and Harry Storer. He scored two goals in four Third Division South games for Tom Bromilow's Newport County in the 1949–50 season. After leaving Rodney Parade, he played for Rugby Town and later became the trainer-coach of Lockheed Leamington.

== Cricket career ==
Gardner was a solid defensive player, who formed a productive opening partnership with Norman Horner for Warwickshire. He played 338 first-class matches for the county between 1947 and 1961, and also made one appearance for an England XI against the touring South Africans in 1955 and one for the Players against the Gentlemen in 1957.

Gardner made his first-class debut in 1947 at the age of 25, becoming a regular in 1949 when he was awarded his county cap. He was an ever-present in the 1951 season when Warwickshire won the County Championship, he contributed 1,338 runs and 27 catches to the success. He scored a total of 17,905 first-class runs at an average of 33.71, passing 1,000 runs in a season for ten consecutive years between 1949 and 1958. His highest score was 215 not out in 415 minutes against Somerset in 1950; Warwickshire went on to win by an innings and 126 runs.

In 1953, Gardner scored 110 against the touring Australians, becoming the first Warwickshire batsman to score a hundred against an Australian side. He was awarded a benefit season in 1958, the last season he appeared regularly.

After finishing his playing career in 1961, he joined the umpires list, standing in 98 first-class matches between 1962 and 1965.

Gardner died at the age of 56, in his native Coventry, following a long illness.

== Football career statistics ==
Appearances and goals by club, season and competition
| Club | Season | League | | | FA Cup | | Total | |
| Club | Season | Division | Apps | Goals | Apps | Goals | Apps | Goals |
|---|---|---|---|---|---|---|---|---|
| Coventry City | 1946–47 | Second Division | 4 | 1 | 0 | 0 | 4 | 1 |
| Coventry City | 1947–48 | Second Division | 3 | 1 | 0 | 0 | 3 | 1 |
| Coventry City | 1948–49 | Second Division | 6 | 1 | 0 | 0 | 6 | 1 |
| Coventry City | Total | | 13 | 3 | 0 | 0 | 13 | 3 |
| Newport County | 1949–50 | Third Division South | 4 | 2 | 0 | 0 | 4 | 2 |
| Career total | | | 17 | 5 | 0 | 0 | 17 | 5 |
