= Norman Horner =

English cricketer

Cricket information
- Batting: Right-handed

Career statistics
Competition	First-class	List A
Matches	362	5
Runs scored	18,533	125
Batting average	29.79	31.25
100s/50s	25/92	0/1
Top score	203*	55
Balls bowled	67	6
Wickets	0	0
Bowling average	–	–
5 wickets in innings	–	–
10 wickets in match	–	–
Best bowling	–	–
Catches/stumpings	131/–	0/–
- Source: CricketArchive, 15 January 2014

Norman Frederick Horner (10 May 1926 – 24 December 2003) was an English first-class cricketer, who played two games for Yorkshire County Cricket Club in 1950, before moving to Warwickshire County Cricket Club in 1951. A right-handed batsman, he made 18,533 runs at 29.79 in his 362-game career.

Born in Queensbury, West Yorkshire, Horner was a neat, dapper batsman, who formed a powerful opening partnership with Fred Gardner, and scored a thousand runs in every season up to 1964. M.J.K. Smith commented that "Norman would have run Fred's legs off him if he had been allowed". He went down the order in 1958, when the Marylebone Cricket Club (MCC) asked Warwickshire to promote Smith to develop him for a possible England opening spot. Horner scored quickly, and enjoyed his best three seasons from 1959 to 1961. On a flat Oval pitch in 1960 he scored a career-best 203 not out, and put on 377 with Billy Ibadulla for the first wicket on the first day, then the highest unbroken opening partnership in cricket history. He was quick in the covers and took 131 catches. He retired in 1965 to concentrate on landscape gardening and his work as a cricket groundsman.

Horner died in Driffield, Yorkshire in December 2003, at the age of 77.
