= 1961–62 North-South Cup =

Tournament details
- Country: Northern Ireland; Republic of Ireland
- Teams: 10

Final positions
- Champions: (Northern Ireland) Glenavon
- Runners-up: (Republic of Ireland) Shelbourne

Tournament statistics
- Matches played: 19
- Goals scored: 88 (4.63 per match)

The 1961–62 North-South Cup was the 2nd and final edition of the North-South Cup, an association football cup competition featuring teams from Northern Ireland and the Republic of Ireland.

Glenavon won the competition, defeating Shelbourne 2–1 on aggregate in the two-legged final. Due to fixture congestion, most of the tournament (mainly from the quarter-finals onwards) was not played until the 1962–63 season.

== Results ==
Teams that were at home in the first leg listed on the left. Ties that were drawn on aggregate were decided via a playoff match.

=== First round ===
Team 1	Agg.	Team 2	1st leg	2nd leg	Playoff
Drumcondra (Republic of Ireland)	4–6	(Northern Ireland) Linfield	3–2	1–2	0–2
Glentoran	7–3	(Republic of Ireland) Shelbourne	3–1	4–2	—

=== Quarter-finals ===
Team 1	Agg.	Team 2	1st leg	2nd leg
Distillery (Northern Ireland)	7–9	(Northern Ireland) Linfield	4–4	3–5
Dundalk (Republic of Ireland)	3–4	(Northern Ireland) Glenavon	2–3	1–1
Glentoran (Northern Ireland)	3–8	(Republic of Ireland) Shelbourne	1–1	2–7
Shamrock Rovers (Republic of Ireland)	10–2	(Northern Ireland) Ards	3–1	7–1

=== Semi-finals ===
Team 1	Agg.	Team 2	1st leg	2nd leg
Glenavon (Northern Ireland)	6–5	(Republic of Ireland) Shamrock Rovers	3–2	3–3
Linfield (Northern Ireland)	2–6	(Republic of Ireland) Shelbourne	0–2	2–4

=== Final ===
22 May 1963

Glenavon (Northern Ireland)	2–1	(Republic of Ireland) Shelbourne
Campbell 7'; Shields 88'	Report	Gilbert 28'

Mourneview Park, Lurgan
24 May 1963

Shelbourne (Republic of Ireland)	0–0	(Northern Ireland) Glenavon
	Report

Tolka Park, Dublin
Referee: Tommy Mitchell (Lurgan)

Glenavon win 2–1 on aggregate.
