= Arthur Cooper (footballer, born 1921) =

English footballer

Personal information
- Full name: Arthur Cooper
- Date of birth: 16 March 1921
- Place of birth: Etruria, Stoke-on-Trent, England
- Date of death: 2008 (aged 86–87)
- Position: Left-half

Youth career
- Shelton St. Mark's
- Shelton Labour Club

Senior career*
Years	Team	Apps	(Gls)
1941–1947	Port Vale	4	(0)
Total		4	(0)
- * Club domestic league appearances and goals

Arthur Cooper (16 March 1921 – 2008) was an English footballer who played at left-half for Port Vale between 1941 and 1947.

== Career ==
Cooper played for Shelton St. Mark's and Shelton Labour Club before joining Port Vale in October 1941. He played regular football in the war leagues. He lost his place in September 1946 and only played four matches in the Football League Third Division South in the 1946–47 season. He was released from the Old Recreation Ground by manager Gordon Hodgson in April 1947 with one goal in 71 appearances in all competitions for the club.

== Career statistics ==
Appearances and goals by club, season and competition
Club	Season	League			FA Cup		Total	
Club	Season	Division	Apps	Goals	Apps	Goals	Apps	Goals
Port Vale	1945–46	–	0	0	6	0	6	0
Port Vale	1946–47	Third Division South	4	0	0	0	4	0
Port Vale	Total		4	0	6	0	10	0
