= Ted Shore =

English footballer

Personal information
- Full name: Edward Shore
- Date of birth: 18 October 1927
- Place of birth: Nuneaton, England
- Date of death: 1976 (aged 48–49)
- Position: Winger

Senior career*
Years	Team	Apps	(Gls)
1945–1948	Port Vale	3	(0)
1948–1950	Coventry City	2	(0)
- Hinckley Athletic
- * Club domestic league appearances and goals

Edward Shore (18 October 1927 – 1976) was an English footballer who played on the wing in the English Football League for Port Vale and Coventry City in the late 1940s. He later represented Hinckley Athletic.

== Career ==
Shore joined Port Vale as an amateur in September 1945. He made his debut in a 4–0 win over Clapton Orient in a war league match at the Old Recreation Ground on 13 October 1945, and signed as a professional later in the month. After becoming a regular, he lost his place in March 1946. He had played ten war league games, scoring two goals, and in the war cup scored one goal in nine appearances. As standard football continued following the end of World War II he played three matches in the Football League Third Division South. He was released by the "Valiants" at the end of the 1947–48 season by manager Gordon Hodgson. Shore moved on to Coventry City. He played two Second Division games in 1948–49 and 1949–50, before "Sky Blues" manager Harry Storer allowed him a move away from Highfield Road. He later played non-League football for Hinckley Athletic.

== Career statistics ==
Appearances and goals by club, season and competition
Club	Season	League			FA Cup		Total	
Club	Season	Division	Apps	Goals	Apps	Goals	Apps	Goals
Port Vale	1945–46	–	0	0	5	0	5	0
Port Vale	1947–48	Third Division South	3	0	0	0	3	0
Port Vale	Total		3	0	5	0	8	0
Coventry City	1948–49	Second Division	1	0	0	0	1	0
Coventry City	1949–50	Second Division	1	0	0	0	1	0
Coventry City	Total		2	0	0	0	2	0
