= Ellis Birchall =

English footballer

Personal information
- Full name: Ellis William Birchall
- Position: Left-back

Senior career*
Years	Team	Apps	(Gls)
1944–1947	Port Vale	0	(0)
- * Club domestic league appearances and goals

Ellis William Birchall was an English footballer who played as a left-back for Port Vale.

== Career ==
Birchall joined Port Vale as an amateur in September 1944 and signed as a professional in April 1945. He made his debut at left-back in a 3–0 win over Notts County in a Football League, Third Division (South) North Region match on 29 December 1945. He made one further appearance in the competition and featured once in the FA Cup before he was given a free transfer in April 1947.

== Career statistics ==
Appearances and goals by club, season and competition
Club	Season	League			FA Cup		Total	
Club	Season	Division	Apps	Goals	Apps	Goals	Apps	Goals
Port Vale	1945–46	–	0	0	1	0	1	0
Career total			0	0	1	0	1	0
