= 1956–57 Irish League =

Irish League
- Season: 1956–57
- Champions: Glenavon; 2nd Irish title
- Matches played: 132
- Goals scored: 599 (4.54 per match)
- Top goalscorer: Jimmy Jones (33 goals)

Location of teams in the Irish League from 1949–1972
Location of Belfast-based teams in the Irish League from 1949–1972

The 1956–57 Irish League was the 56th edition of the Irish League, the highest level of league competition in Northern Irish football. The league comprised 12 teams, and Glenavon won the championship.

== League standings ==
Pos	Team	Pld	W	D	L	GF	GA	GR	Pts	Qualification
1	Glenavon (C)	22	16	3	3	71	22	3.227	35	Qualification for the European Cup preliminary round
2	Linfield	22	14	6	2	67	32	2.094	34	
3	Ards	22	13	4	5	66	33	2.000	30	
4	Glentoran	22	13	4	5	56	39	1.436	30	
5	Coleraine	22	11	3	8	54	51	1.059	25	
6	Distillery	22	9	4	9	47	62	0.758	22	
7	Bangor	22	7	6	9	47	44	1.068	20	
8	Derry City	22	8	3	11	41	52	0.788	19	
9	Crusaders	22	8	2	12	37	47	0.787	18	
10	Portadown	22	5	6	11	47	66	0.712	16	
11	Ballymena United	22	3	3	16	35	72	0.486	9	
12	Cliftonville	22	2	2	18	31	79	0.392	6	

Source: rsssf.com
(C) Champions

== Results ==
Home \ Away	ARD	BAN	BLM	CLI	COL	CRU	DIS	DER	GLV	GLT	LIN	POR
Ards		5–4	2–1	4–3	5–1	3–1	8–1	4–2	1–2	3–3	1–1	4–1
Bangor	0–3		1–1	3–0	2–3	1–1	6–1	5–0	0–4	1–1	4–2	1–1
Ballymena United	0–5	2–3		4–3	1–1	5–2	2–4	1–2	0–4	1–3	1–6	6–1
Cliftonville	0–7	2–6	2–1		3–4	0–2	1–6	4–1	1–1	2–4	1–4	1–3
Coleraine	2–1	4–2	4–1	2–2		2–5	2–3	2–1	5–2	3–1	3–3	4–2
Crusaders	0–1	0–1	3–1	4–1	2–3		0–2	3–1	2–1	3–1	0–5	4–2
Distillery	3–1	3–2	5–1	2–0	1–5	2–2		2–0	1–3	2–2	1–4	2–2
Derry City	0–2	1–1	3–0	4–1	2–0	4–1	4–1		2–2	2–1	3–4	2–2
Glenavon	1–0	3–0	5–0	6–1	4–0	2–0	8–1	7–1		3–1	3–2	5–0
Glentoran	1–0	3–1	7–2	2–1	3–2	3–1	3–0	4–0	2–1		1–3	5–4
Linfield	2–2	2–1	3–1	5–1	3–1	4–0	1–1	3–2	0–2	2–2		3–2
Portadown	4–4	2–2	3–3	4–1	2–1	2–1	5–3	2–4	1–3	2–3	0–4	

Source: Irish League Archive
Legend: Blue = home team win; Yellow = draw; Red = away team win.
