= Roy Felton =

English footballer (1918–1982)

Personal information
- Full name: Robert Francis Foster Felton
- Date of birth: 12 August 1918
- Place of birth: Gateshead, England
- Date of death: 24 April 1982 (aged 63)
- Place of death: Aintree, England
- Height: 5 ft 9 1/2 in (1.77 m)
- Position: Full-back

Youth career
- 1936–1937: Liverpool
- 1937–1938: Everton

Senior career*
Years	Team	Apps	(Gls)
1938–1946	Port Vale	10	(0)
1946	Crystal Palace	1	(0)
- South Liverpool
- Nottingham Forest
- Northwich Victoria
- * Club domestic league appearances and goals

Robert Francis Foster "Roy" Felton (12 August 1918 – 24 April 1982) was an English footballer who played for Everton, Port Vale, Crystal Palace, South Liverpool, Nottingham Forest, and Northwich Victoria.

== Career ==
Felton played for Liverpool in the 1936-37 season before signing for Everton before joining Port Vale in June 1938. He played ten Third Division South and two cup games before being called up for military training in August 1939. During the war he guested for Bath City, but returned to the Old Recreation Ground safely in August 1945. Injuries limited his appearances, however, and he only managed to play seven War League, five FA Cup, and three War Cup games before refusing new terms in the summer of 1946. After having a trial with Crystal Palace, in which he played one league game, he signed with South Liverpool. After a trial with Nottingham Forest he joined Northwich Victoria.

== Career statistics ==
Appearances and goals by club, season and competition
Club	Season	League			FA Cup		Other		Total	
Club	Season	Division	Apps	Goals	Apps	Goals	Apps	Goals	Apps	Goals
Port Vale	1938–39	Third Division South	10	0	0	0	2	0	12	0
Port Vale	1945–46	–	0	0	5	0	0	0	5	0
Port Vale	Total		10	0	5	0	2	0	17	0
Crystal Palace	1946–47	Third Division South	1	0	0	0	0	0	1	0
