= 1997–98 Gold Cup =

Tournament details
- Country: Northern Ireland
- Teams: 18

Final positions
- Champions: Glenavon (4th win)
- Runners-up: Coleraine

Tournament statistics
- Matches played: 52
- Goals scored: 172 (3.31 per match)

The 1997–98 Gold Cup was the 79th edition of the Gold Cup, a cup competition in Northern Irish football.

The tournament was won by Glenavon for the 4th time, defeating Coleraine 4–2 in the final at Windsor Park.

== Group standings ==
=== Section A ===
Pos	Team	Pld	W	D	L	GF	GA	GD	Pts	Result
1	Crusaders	5	4	1	0	12	6	+6	13	Advance to quarter-final
2	Glenavon	5	3	2	0	12	5	+7	11	Advance to quarter-final
3	Dungannon Swifts	5	2	0	3	10	13	−3	6	
4	Larne	5	2	0	3	6	10	−4	6	
5	Ballymena United	5	1	1	3	8	9	−1	4	
6	Ballyclare Comrades	5	1	0	4	7	12	−5	3	

Source: Irish League Archive

=== Section B ===
Pos	Team	Pld	W	D	L	GF	GA	GD	Pts	Result
1	Distillery	5	3	1	1	10	6	+4	10	Advance to quarter-final
2	Linfield	5	3	0	2	15	5	+10	9	Advance to quarter-final
3	Coleraine	5	3	0	2	13	10	+3	9	Advance to quarter-final
4	Bangor	5	2	1	2	7	6	+1	7	
5	Ards	5	2	1	2	9	13	−4	7	
6	Limavady United	5	0	1	4	4	18	−14	1	

Source: Irish League Archive

=== Section C ===
Pos	Team	Pld	W	D	L	GF	GA	GD	Pts	Result
1	Omagh Town	5	3	2	0	8	3	+5	11	Advance to quarter-final
2	Cliftonville	5	2	3	0	6	1	+5	9	Advance to quarter-final
3	Newry Town	5	3	0	2	5	4	+1	9	Advance to quarter-final
4	Portadown	5	2	1	2	14	7	+7	7	
5	Glentoran	5	1	1	3	6	13	−7	4	
6	Carrick Rangers	5	0	1	4	2	13	−11	1	

Source: Irish League Archive

== Quarter-finals ==
Team 1	Score	Team 2
Cliftonville	0–1 (a.e.t.)	Coleraine
Linfield	0–1	Glenavon
Newry Town	0–1	Crusaders
Omagh Town	3–1	Distillery

== Semi-finals ==
Team 1	Score	Team 2
Coleraine	2–1	Omagh Town
Glenavon	2–0	Crusaders

== Final ==
2 December 1997

Glenavon	4–2	Coleraine
Grant 23'; Tumilty 26'; Ferguson 36', 71'		McCallion 89'; Gaston 90'

Windsor Park, Belfast
Referee: John Ferry (Derry)
