= Ken Faulkner =

English footballer

Personal information
- Full name: Kenneth Gordon Faulkner
- Date of birth: 10 September 1923
- Place of birth: Smethwick, England
- Date of death: 2000 (aged 77)
- Place of death: Birmingham, England
- Position: Forward

Youth career
- –: Smethwick Highfield

Senior career*
Years	Team	Apps	(Gls)
1943–1947	Birmingham City	2	(0)
–	Oldbury United		
- * Club domestic league appearances and goals

Kenneth Gordon Faulkner (10 September 1923 – 2000) was an English footballer who played in the Football League for Birmingham City.

Faulkner was born in Smethwick, Staffordshire. Capped by England at schoolboy level, he had a successful trial with Birmingham City during the Second World War. Faulkner, a forward, played for Birmingham in the 1944–45 season of wartime competition, and also made guest appearances for Coventry City and Port Vale. He made his debut in the penultimate game of the 1946–47 Second Division season, playing at outside right in a 2–0 win at Millwall. The last game of that season proved to be his last for the club; he was released in the 1947 close season and joined Oldbury United.
