= 1959–60 Irish League =

Irish League
- Season: 1959–60
- Champions: Glenavon; 3rd Irish title
- Matches played: 132
- Goals scored: 546 (4.14 per match)
- Top goalscorer: Jimmy Jones (29 goals)

Location of teams in the Irish League from 1949–1972
Location of Belfast-based teams in the Irish League from 1949–1971

The 1959–60 Irish League was the 59th edition of the Irish League, the highest level of league competition in Northern Irish football. The league consisted of 12 teams, and Glenavon won the championship.

== League standings ==
| Pos | Team | Pld | W | D | L | GF | GA | GR | Pts | Qualification |
|---|---|---|---|---|---|---|---|---|---|---|
| 1 | Glenavon (C) | 22 | 17 | 1 | 4 | 67 | 28 | 2.393 | 35 | Qualification for the European Cup preliminary round |
| 2 | Glentoran | 22 | 14 | 4 | 4 | 60 | 31 | 1.935 | 32 | |
| 3 | Distillery | 22 | 12 | 5 | 5 | 55 | 38 | 1.447 | 29 | |
| 4 | Linfield | 22 | 12 | 5 | 5 | 63 | 46 | 1.370 | 29 | |
| 5 | Ballymena United | 22 | 10 | 3 | 9 | 49 | 46 | 1.065 | 23 | |
| 6 | Crusaders | 22 | 9 | 5 | 8 | 43 | 44 | 0.977 | 23 | |
| 7 | Portadown | 22 | 7 | 8 | 7 | 35 | 40 | 0.875 | 22 | |
| 8 | Ards | 22 | 8 | 3 | 11 | 37 | 47 | 0.787 | 19 | |
| 9 | Bangor | 22 | 7 | 4 | 11 | 39 | 45 | 0.867 | 18 | |
| 10 | Derry City | 22 | 6 | 3 | 13 | 41 | 44 | 0.932 | 15 | |
| 11 | Coleraine | 22 | 6 | 3 | 13 | 35 | 62 | 0.565 | 15 | |
| 12 | Cliftonville | 22 | 2 | 0 | 20 | 22 | 75 | 0.293 | 4 | |

Source: rsssf.com
(C) Champions

== Results ==
| Home \ Away | ARD | BAN | BLM | CLI | COL | CRU | DIS | DER | GLV | GLT | LIN | POR |
|---|---|---|---|---|---|---|---|---|---|---|---|---|
| Ards | | 1–4 | 1–1 | 4–1 | 2–0 | 4–1 | 4–5 | 2–1 | 2–0 | 1–2 | 2–5 | 2–0 |
| Bangor | 5–1 | | 1–0 | 3–2 | 1–2 | 2–2 | 0–2 | 3–3 | 1–3 | 2–2 | 3–2 | 1–2 |
| Ballymena United | 2–1 | 2–0 | | 3–1 | 4–4 | 1–2 | 1–3 | 2–0 | 0–4 | 5–3 | 2–4 | 2–2 |
| Cliftonville | 2–0 | 1–3 | 0–4 | | 1–0 | 0–1 | 0–1 | 0–4 | 0–1 | 0–5 | 3–7 | 0–2 |
| Coleraine | 1–3 | 4–3 | 2–5 | 4–3 | | 3–2 | 1–3 | 1–0 | 0–6 | 1–2 | 1–1 | 2–4 |
| Crusaders | 2–2 | 1–0 | 3–2 | 4–1 | 5–0 | | 1–1 | 3–0 | 1–3 | 1–3 | 5–1 | 1–1 |
| Distillery | 3–0 | 0–0 | 1–2 | 5–2 | 5–2 | 2–3 | | 3–2 | 3–5 | 1–2 | 4–4 | 4–1 |
| Derry City | 1–4 | 2–4 | 6–1 | 5–0 | 1–2 | 5–2 | 1–0 | | 0–2 | 0–2 | 1–3 | 2–2 |
| Glenavon | 4–0 | 5–2 | 1–4 | 5–1 | 4–2 | 5–0 | 1–2 | 2–4 | | 0–0 | 2–1 | 1–0 |
| Glentoran | 5–1 | 3–1 | 2–0 | 3–1 | 4–1 | 3–0 | 1–2 | 2–2 | 3–4 | | 7–3 | 1–1 |
| Linfield | 2–0 | 2–0 | 4–1 | 7–1 | 2–1 | 1–1 | 3–3 | 2–0 | 2–5 | 3–2 | | 1–1 |
| Portadown | 0–0 | 3–0 | 1–5 | 4–2 | 1–1 | 4–2 | 2–2 | 2–1 | 0–4 | 1–3 | 1–3 | |

Source: Irish League Archive
Legend: Blue = home team win; Yellow = draw; Red = away team win.
