= George Willis (footballer) =

English footballer

Personal information
- Full name: George Willis
- Date of birth: 9 November 1921
- Place of birth: Stanley, County Durham, England
- Date of death: 25 May 2011 (aged 89)
- Place of death: Exeter, England
- Position: Inside forward

Youth career
- 1940-1943: Wolverhampton Wanderers

Senior career*
Years	Team	Apps	(Gls)
1943–1944	Brighton & Hove Albion	28	(13)
1944–1951	Plymouth Argyle	56	(14)
1951–1957	Exeter City	26	(3)
- Taunton Town
- Falmouth Town
Total		110+	(30+)
- * Club domestic league appearances and goals

George Willis (9 November 1921 – 25 May 2011) was an English footballer who played as an inside forward for Brighton & Hove Albion, Plymouth Argyle, Exeter City, and Taunton Town. He won the Third Division South title with Plymouth in 1951–52.

== Career ==
Willis joined Wolverhampton Wanderers in January 1945, having worked as a miner on leaving school. He guested for Port Vale and Crewe Alexandra in 1946. In February 1948, he moved on to Brighton & Hove Albion, who struggled at the foot of the Third Division South table in the 1947–48 campaign, before rising to sixth place in 1948–49. He scored 13 goals in 28 league games for Don Welsh's "Seagulls" before leaving the Goldstone Ground for Plymouth Argyle in May 1949. Jimmy Rae's "Pilgrims" suffered relegation out of the Second Division in 1949–50. Argyle finished fourth in the Third Division South in 1950–51, before winning promotion as the division's champions in 1951–52. The Home Park club then came to within two places of promotion to the First Division in 1952–53, before dropping down to within two places of relegation in 1953–54. Plymouth finished just one place and three points above the drop zone in 1954–55 before suffering relegation in 1955–56 under the stewardship of Jack Rowley. Willis scored 14 goals in 59 league appearances for the club. He joined Norman Dodgin's Exeter City after he and John Porteous were signed for a fee of £250 in March 1956. He spent the 1956–57 season at St James Park, before a spell in the Western League with Taunton Town. He also had a spell with Falmouth Town in the South Western League in the 1958–59 season and was a South Western League Cup winner in his only season with the club.

== Personal and later life ==
Willis had two children with June, his wife, called Roy and Lynda, and two children from a previous marriage. He ran the Ram and Ewe Bars at the University of Exeter for many years. He was a grandfather to Kate and Emily. Willis died on 25 May 2011, aged 84.

== Career statistics ==
Appearances and goals by club, season and competition
Club	Season	League			FA Cup		Total	
Club	Season	Division	Apps	Goals	Apps	Goals	Apps	Goals
Brighton & Hove Albion	1947–48	Third Division South	15	8	0	0	15	8
Brighton & Hove Albion	1948–49	Third Division South	13	5	0	0	13	5
Brighton & Hove Albion	Total		28	13	0	0	28	13
Plymouth Argyle	1949–50	Third Division South	1	0	0	0	1	0
Plymouth Argyle	1950–51	Third Division South	8	2	1	0	9	2
Plymouth Argyle	1951–52	Third Division South	2	0	0	0	2	0
Plymouth Argyle	1952–53	Second Division	10	2	1	0	11	2
Plymouth Argyle	1953–54	Second Division	7	2	0	0	7	2
Plymouth Argyle	1954–55	Second Division	14	4	1	0	15	4
Plymouth Argyle	1955–56	Second Division	14	4	0	0	14	4
Plymouth Argyle	Total		56	14	3	0	59	14
Exeter City	1955–56	Third Division South	13	2	0	0	13	2
Exeter City	1956–57	Third Division South	13	1	0	0	13	1
Exeter City	Total		26	3	0	0	26	3
