= Jimmy Jones (footballer, born 1928) =

Irish footballer (1928–2014)

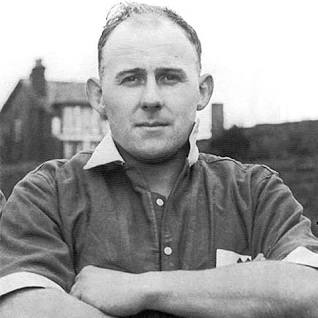

Personal information
- Full name: James Jones
- Date of birth: 25 July 1928
- Place of birth: Keady, Northern Ireland
- Date of death: 13 February 2014 (aged 85)
- Height: 5 ft 9 1/2 in (1.77 m)
- Position: Centre forward

Senior career*
Years	Team	Apps	(Gls)
1943–1944	Sunnyside	5	(7)
1944–1945	Glenavon Juniors	25	(36)
1945–1946	Shankill Young Men	22	(40)
1946–1949	Belfast Celtic	33	(43)
1950	Larne	0	(0)
1950–1951	Fulham	0	(0)
1951–1962	Glenavon	222	(269)
1962–1963	Portadown	14	(8)
1963–1964	Bangor	20	(12)
1964–1965	Newry Town	34	(31)
Total		369	(443)

International career
1947–1959	Irish League XI	24	(11)
1947	Northern Ireland Youth	1	(2)
1956–1957	Northern Ireland	3	(1)
- * Club domestic league appearances and goals

James Jones (25 July 1928 – 13 February 2014) was a Northern Irish footballer who played as a forward. He is the leading goalscorer in the history of Irish League football with a total of 647 goals. According to RSSSF, he scored more than 840 goals in official matches, which makes him one of the most prolific goal scorers of all time.

In a career spanning almost 20 years, Jones started his career with Belfast Celtic. After having his leg broken by rival supporters, he spent over a year out of the game, before returning at intermediate level with Larne. After a short spell there and a season in English football with Fulham, he joined Glenavon where he helped to propel the club to the most successful period in their history. He later represented Portadown, Bangor and Newry Town. He also won 3 caps for Northern Ireland, scoring 1 goal.

== Early life ==
Jones was born in his maternal grandmother's home in Keady, County Armagh, Northern Ireland, the only child of Thomas Jones, a police sergeant, and his wife Ellen (née Wilson). After education at Carrick Primary School and Lurgan Technical College, he served his apprenticeship as a mechanic, while making an impact as a footballer.

== Club career ==
=== Belfast Celtic ===
Jones signed for Belfast Celtic in 1946 after playing football with Glenavon Juniors (the junior side of Irish League team Glenavon) in the Mid-Ulster League and Shankill Young Men in the Northern Amateur Football League. He was prolific at junior level, scoring 38 goals in 30 games for Glenavon Juniors and 50 goals in 30 games for Shankill Young Men. Jones made an immediate impact with Belfast Celtic. After spending his first season with the reserve side, he scored 62 goals in all competitions in the 1947–48 season for the senior side. Such was his ability that his club rejected a £16,000 offer from Newcastle United. During the following season, Jones had 27 goals from 19 games (including six hat-tricks), prior to an infamous match on Boxing Day 1948 with Linfield. At the end of the match, Linfield supporters invaded the pitch and Jones was chased onto terracing and stamped on until his leg was broken. Due to the outcry over this incident, Belfast Celtic resigned from the league at the end of the season and left football.

Jones had surgery to save his leg (which left his right leg shorter than the left), but would not play again until March 1950. He was officially released from his Belfast Celtic contract on 1 March 1950, having scored 102 goals in 80 games.

He signed for Irish Intermediate League side Larne on 5 March 1950. After just six days there, and prior to Larne's next match against Brantwood, he joined Fulham in the summer of 1950, where he spent one season but made no first-team appearances due to a technicality over his registration which meant he could only play in reserve team matches.

=== Glenavon ===
In 1951, he joined Glenavon where he would spend 11 years and became a club legend. He was the leading Irish League goalscorer for some years in the fifties, and finished as Irish League outright leading goalscorer in six seasons (a record still unbroken), during the most successful period in Glenavon's history where they won the Irish League championship and Irish Cup three times each. Jones also hit 74 goals (in all competitions) during the 1956–57 Irish League season. He scored 517 goals in total for the Lurgan Blues. Jones later served as club captain on the team's tour of the United States in 1962.

=== Later career ===
Jones later represented Irish League sides Portadown and Bangor, spending a season with each club. He scored 14 goals in 28 games for Portadown and 14 goals in 26 games for Bangor. His final season was spent in the Irish League B Division (which was then the second-tier of football in Northern Ireland) with Newry Town, where he scored 32 goals in 32 games before retiring in 1965 with a national domestic record of 647 goals. He remains the leading goalscorer in Irish league history.

== Personal life ==
Jones met his wife, Cicely, at a badminton supper at his local church. Originally from County Kilkenny, she was training to be a nurse in Lurgan. They have two children, Jennifer and Trevor. Jones was also a dedicated motorcycle racer in summer and was seen regularly competing in the Ulster Grand Prix.

Jones died on 13 February 2014, at the age of 85.

== International career ==
Jones scored three goals in the Irish League representative team which defeated the Football League 5–3 at Windsor Park in 1953, and played in three full international games for Northern Ireland, scoring once against Wales in Cardiff in the 1956 British Home Championship.

== Honours ==
Belfast Celtic

- Irish League: 1947–48
- Gold Cup: 1947–48
- City Cup: 1947–48, 1948–49

Glenavon

- Irish League: 1951–52, 1956–57, 1959–60
- Irish Cup: 1956–57, 1958–59, 1960–61
- Gold Cup: 1954–55, 1956–57
- City Cup: 1954–55, 1955–56, 1960–61
- Ulster Cup: 1954–55, 1958–59

== See also ==
- List of footballers with 500 or more goals
