= 1949–50 Newport County A.F.C. season =

Welsh association football club season

Newport County
1949–50 season
- Manager: Tom Bromilow
- Stadium: Somerton Park
- Third Division South: 21st (re-elected)
- FA Cup: 3rd round
- Welsh Cup: 5th round
- Top goalscorer: League: Comley (19); All: Comley (21)
- Highest home attendance: 21,543 vs Notts County (8 October 1949)
- Lowest home attendance: 6,414 vs Exeter City (18 March 1950)
- Average home league attendance: 11,536
Home colours	Away colours

The 1949–50 season was Newport County's third consecutive season in the Third Division South since relegation from the Second Division at the end of the 1946–47 season. The club finished in a re-election place, but since the division was being expanded by two clubs they were re-elected without a vote.

== Season review ==
=== Results summary ===
Overall								Home						Away					
Pld	W	D	L	GF	GA	GAv	Pts	W	D	L	GF	GA	Pts	W	D	L	GF	GA	Pts
42	13	8	21	67	98	0.684	34	11	5	5	50	34	27	2	3	16	17	64	7

Source: rsssf.com

=== Results by round ===
Round	1	2	3	4	5	6	7	8	9	10	11	12	13	14	15	16	17	18	19	20	21	22	23	24	25	26	27	28	29	30	31	32	33	34	35	36	37	38	39	40	41	42
Ground	H	A	A	H	A	A	H	H	A	H	A	H	A	H	A	H	A	H	H	A	H	A	H	A	H	A	H	A	H	A	H	A	H	H	H	A	A	H	A	A	H	A
Result	W	L	L	L	L	L	L	W	L	W	D	D	L	W	D	W	L	D	W	L	W	L	W	L	W	L	L	L	D	L	L	L	W	D	W	W	L	D	D	L	L	W
Position	8	8	16	20	22	22	22	21	22	20	20	21	22	21	20	14	17	17	14	16	15	17	16	17	15	16	17	18	18	21	21	21	21	21	20	18	18	17	18	18	22	17

Source: statto.com
A = Away; H = Home; W = Win; D = Draw; L = Loss

== Fixtures and results ==
=== Third Division South ===
Date	Opponents	Venue	Result	Scorers	Attendance
20 Aug 1949	Norwich City	H	3–2	Hayward, Comley, Parker	16,238
25 Aug 1949	Northampton Town	A	3–4	Parker 2, Comley	12,718
27 Aug 1949	Southend United	A	0–6		11,577
1 Sep 1949	Northampton Town	H	1–4	Carr	12,536
3 Sep 1949	Bristol City	A	0–6		20,007
7 Sep 1949	Torquay United	A	3–5	Comley, Parker, Carr	9,414
10 Sep 1949	Brighton & Hove Albion	H	0–1		11,157
15 Sep 1949	Torquay United	H	1–0	Harper	10,462
17 Sep 1949	Walsall	A	0–2		10,846
24 Sep 1949	Millwall	H	4–3	Parker 2, Gardner 2	12,773
1 Oct 1949	Swindon Town	A	1–1	Roffi	15,284
8 Oct 1949	Notts County	H	1–1	Newall	21,543
15 Oct 1949	Port Vale	A	0–1		12,599
22 Oct 1949	Ipswich Town	H	1–0	Comley	11,419
29 Oct 1949	Exeter City	A	3–3	Comley, Parker, Griffiths	8,095
5 Nov 1949	Leyton Orient	H	3–2	Roffi 2, Griffiths	11,792
12 Nov 1949	Reading	A	1–4	Payne	15,300
19 Nov 1949	Watford	H	3–3	Comley 2, Harper	11,884
3 Dec 1949	Bournemouth & Boscombe Athletic	H	5–0	Comley 2, Parker, Harper, Roffi,	10,560
17 Dec 1949	Norwich City	A	0–4		17,895
26 Dec 1949	Aldershot	H	6–0	Harper 2, Griffiths 2, Comley, Parker	13,860
27 Dec 1949	Aldershot	A	1–4	Griffiths	7,318
31 Dec 1949	Bristol City	H	6–4	Bowen 3, Parker 2, Comley	13,208
14 Jan 1950	Brighton & Hove Albion	A	0–5		11,502
21 Jan 1950	Walsall	H	2–1	Comley 2	8,840
28 Jan 1950	Crystal Palace	A	0–1		9,895
18 Feb 1950	Swindon Town	H	1–2	Roffi	10,622
25 Feb 1950	Notts County	A	0–7		28,427
4 Mar 1950	Port Vale	H	1–1	Griffiths	8,762
11 Mar 1950	Ipswich Town	A	0–1		12,678
18 Mar 1950	Exeter City	H	1–2	Comley	6,414
25 Mar 1950	Leyton Orient	A	1–2	Parker	8,819
30 Mar 1950	Southend United	H	2–1	Comley, Parker	7,297
1 Apr 1950	Reading	H	1–1	Roffi	9,923
7 Apr 1950	Nottingham Forest	H	4–1	Roffi 2, Comley, Parker	13,337
8 Apr 1950	Watford	A	1–0	Roffi	11,729
10 Apr 1950	Nottingham Forest	A	0–3		15,799
15 Apr 1950	Crystal Palace	H	2–2	Comley, Parker	11,459
22 Apr 1950	Bournemouth & Boscombe Athletic	A	1–1	Comley	10,842
24 Apr 1950	Bristol Rovers	A	0–3		10,657
29 Apr 1950	Bristol Rovers	H	2–3	Comley, Roffi	8,173
1 May 1950	Millwall	A	2–1	Hayward, Bowen	15,472

=== FA Cup ===
Round	Date	Opponents	Venue	Result	Scorers	Attendance
1	26 Nov 1949	Crystal Palace	A	3–0	Comley, Payne, Griffiths	12,719
2	10 Dec 1949	Gateshead	H	1–1	Harper	15,184
2r	15 Dec 1949	Gateshead	A	2–1 a.e.t.	Parker, Harper	14,000
3	7 Jan 1950	Port Vale	H	1–2	Comley	17,781

=== Welsh Cup ===
Round	Date	Opponents	Venue	Result	Scorers	Attendance
5	12 Jan 1950	Merthyr Tydfil	A	0–3		

== League table ==
Pos	Team	Pld	W	D	L	GF	GA	GAv	Pts	Promotion
18	Leyton Orient	42	12	11	19	53	85	0.624	35	
19	Walsall	42	9	16	17	61	62	0.984	34	
20	Aldershot	42	13	8	21	48	60	0.800	34	
21	Newport County	42	13	8	21	67	98	0.684	34	Re-elected
22	Millwall	42	14	4	24	55	63	0.873	32	Re-elected
