= Stan Kelley =

English footballer

Personal information
- Full name: Stanley Robert Kelley
- Date of birth: 14 June 1920
- Place of birth: Foleshill, England
- Date of death: 1993 (aged 72–73)
- Position: Left-back

Youth career
- 1938–1939: Herberts Athletic

Senior career*
| Years | Team | Apps | (Gls) |
| 1939–1947 | Coventry City | 4 | (0) |
- * Club domestic league appearances and goals

Stanley Robert Kelley (14 June 1920 – 1993) was an English footballer who played as a left-back for Coventry City.

== Career ==
Kelley played for Herberts Athletic and Coventry City. He played one game as a guest for Port Vale during World War II in a 1–0 win over Walsall at the Old Recreation Ground on 19 January 1946.

== Career statistics ==
Appearances and goals by club, season and competition
| Club | Season | League | | | FA Cup | | Total | |
| Club | Season | Division | Apps | Goals | Apps | Goals | Apps | Goals |
|---|---|---|---|---|---|---|---|---|
| Coventry City | 1946–47 | Second Division | 4 | 0 | 0 | 0 | 4 | 0 |
