= Paul Dechamps =

Belgian footballer (1921–1990)

Personal information
- Full name: Paul Victor Auguste Dechamps
- Date of birth: 17 October 1921
- Place of birth: Aywaille, Belgium
- Date of death: 6 December 1990 (aged 69)
- Position: Striker

Senior career*
| Years | Team | Apps | (Gls) |
| 1937–1946 | Aywaille FC | | |
| 1946–1956 | RFC Liège | 314 | (224) |
| 1956–1961 | Fléron FC | 134 | (85) |
| 1961–1964 | Eupen | 77 | (49) |
| Total | | 525 | (358) |

International career
| 1947–1955 | Belgium | 3 | (3) |
- * Club domestic league appearances and goals

Paul Victor Auguste Dechamps (17 October 1921 – 6 December 1990) was a Belgian footballer who played as a striker for RFC Liège, scoring 241 goals in 299 matches over the course of 10 league seasons.

== Biography ==
Dechamps joined Aywaille FC in 1937, at the age of 16, and made his debut in the first team a season later. Due to the outbreak of World War II, it took a while before RFC Liège discovered him in 1943 and his impact on the team was instantaneous since they became champions in the Belgian Second Division in 1943–44 and Dechamps scored no fewer than 50 goals. Following an off-season in 1944–45 due to the war, Dechamps made his first-division debut for Liège in July 1945, playing with them for more than 10 years until his departure in 1956.

Dechamps helped Liège team was Belgian champion in 1952 and 1953. During his time Liège, he formed a deadly partnership with José Moes and Pol Anoul. He was Liège's top scorer a record nine times. In 1956 Dechamps moved to Fléron FC, where he continued to be a prolific goalscorer as he scored 85 goals in 134 matches.

In the summer of 1961, at almost 40, Dechamps decided to go to the Belgian Fourth Division club Eupen, and he played football there for two more seasons. Despite his advanced age, he did not lose his goalscoring instinct and was still able to score a respectable 49 goals in 77 matches. After the 1962–63 season he stopped, but in October 1963 at the request of the chairman, he put his shoes back on just to play that season completely. In 1964 he went to FC Malmundaria and two years later another season at FC Soesterberg and then became a coach in 1967.

In total, Dechamps scored 241 goals in 299 matches in the Belgian First Division, thus being ranked ninth in the highest Belgian goalscorer of all time. He was also a three-time top scorer in 1957 in provincial and second in 1944 and first in 1949.
