= Roger Whittle =

English footballer

Personal information
- Full name: John Roger Whittle
- Place of birth: Liverpool, England
- Height: 6 ft 1 1/2 in (1.87 m)
- Position: Right-back

Youth career
- Liverpool

Senior career*
| Years | Team | Apps | (Gls) |
| 1938–1946 | Port Vale | 4 | (0) |
| Total | | 4 | (0) |
- * Club domestic league appearances and goals

John Roger Whittle was an English footballer who played at right-back for Port Vale just before World War II.

== Career ==
Whittle joined Port Vale in May 1938 and made his debut in a 1–1 draw with Swindon Town at the County Ground on 4 February 1939. He played in the 1–0 defeat to Torquay United seven days later at the Old Recreation Ground, and also was in the side for two further Third Division South games in April 1939. During the war he guested for Leeds United, Bath City and Watford, before returning to Burslem in September 1945. However, he only played two games in the war leagues in September 1945 before he departed in the summer of 1946.

== Career statistics ==
Appearances and goals by club, season and competition
| Club | Season | League | | | FA Cup | | Other | | Total | |
| Club | Season | Division | Apps | Goals | Apps | Goals | Apps | Goals | Apps | Goals |
|---|---|---|---|---|---|---|---|---|---|---|
| Port Vale | 1938–39 | Third Division South | 4 | 0 | 0 | 0 | 0 | 0 | 4 | 0 |
| Total | | | 4 | 0 | 0 | 0 | 0 | 0 | 4 | 0 |
