= Dennis Simpson =

English footballer

Personal information
- Full name: Dennis Ewart Simpson
- Date of birth: 1 November 1919
- Place of birth: Coventry, England
- Date of death: 10 January 2002 (aged 82)
- Position: Right winger

Youth career
- Saleem Baptist

Senior career*
Years	Team	Apps	(Gls)
1939–1950	Coventry City	67	(5)
1950–1955	Reading	172	(32)
1955–1957	Exeter City	30	(4)
- Exmouth Town
Total		269	(41)
- * Club domestic league appearances and goals

Dennis Ewart Simpson (1 November 1919 – 10 January 2002) was an English footballer who played on the right-wing for Coventry City, Reading, Exeter City in the Football League.

== Career ==
Simpson signed with Coventry City in May 1939 after being spotted playing for Saleem Baptist. He guested for Port Vale during the war, in 1946. After continuing his career at Highfield Road, he scored five goals in 67 Second Division games, as Coventry finished eighth in 1946–47, tenth in 1947–48, 16th in 1948–49, and 12th in 1949–50. Simpson was allowed to leave the club by manager Harry Storer and moved on to Reading in May 1950. He helped the "Royals" to third in the Third Division South in 1950–51, before they moved up to second place in 1951–52 – just five points behind champions Plymouth Argyle. Reading then dropped down the league after outgoing manager Ted Drake was replaced by Jack Smith, finishing 11th in 1952–53, eighth in 1953–54, and 18th in 1954–55. Simpsons scored 31 goals in 172 league goals during his time at Elm Park. He joined Third Division South club Exeter City in Ma1y 1955, remaining as a part-time professional as he worked as an engineer in Exmouth. He helped Norman Dodgin's "Grecians" to finish 16th in 1955–56 and 21st in 1956–57. He scored four goals in 30 league games during his brief spell at St James Park but left the club in February 1957 after refusing to train full-time. He later ended his career at non-League Exmouth Town.

== Career statistics ==
Appearances and goals by club, season and competition
Club	Season	League			FA Cup		Total	
Club	Season	Division	Apps	Goals	Apps	Goals	Apps	Goals
Coventry City	1945–46		0	0	2	1	2	1
Coventry City	1946–47	Second Division	12	0	0	0	12	0
Coventry City	1947–48	Second Division	29	1	0	0	29	1
Coventry City	1948–49	Second Division	18	3	0	0	18	3
Coventry City	1949–50	Second Division	8	1	0	0	8	1
Coventry City	Total		67	5	2	1	69	6
Reading	1950–51	Third Division South	45	10	3	0	48	10
Reading	1951–52	Third Division South	42	7	5	0	47	7
Reading	1952–53	Third Division South	29	6	2	0	31	6
Reading	1953–54	Third Division South	38	7	1	0	39	7
Reading	1954–55	Third Division South	18	2	6	0	24	2
Reading	Total		172	32	17	0	189	32
Exeter City	1955–56	Third Division South	27	4	2	1	29	5
Exeter City	1956–57	Third Division South	3	0	0	0	3	0
Exeter City	Total		30	4	2	1	32	5
Career total			269	41	21	2	290	43
