= Bobby Braithwaite =

Northern Irish footballer (1937–2015)

Personal information
- Full name: Robert Munn Braithwaite
- Date of birth: 24 February 1937
- Place of birth: Belfast, Northern Ireland
- Date of death: 14 October 2015 (aged 78)
- Place of death: East London, South Africa
- Height: 1.73 m (5 ft 8 in)
- Position: Left winger

Senior career*
Years	Team	Apps	(Gls)
1955–1957	Crusaders		
1957–1963	Linfield	274	(69)
1963–1967	Middlesbrough	71	(12)
1967–1968	Durban City	36	(3)
1968–1971	Bloemfontein City		
1971–1974	East London United		

International career
1962–1965	Northern Ireland	10	(0)
1956–1963	Irish League XI	8	(0)
- * Club domestic league appearances and goals

Robert "Bobby" Braithwaite (24 February 1937 – 14 October 2015) was a Northern Irish footballer who played as a left winger.

Born in Belfast and growing up near Seaview, Braithwaite began his career with Crusaders, before joining Linfield in 1957. He later played for Middlesbrough and won ten caps for Northern Ireland. Between 1956 and 1963, he represented the Irish League XI eight times.
