= Stephen McBride (footballer, born 1964) =

Northern Irish footballer

Personal information
- Full name: Stephen Derek McBride
- Date of birth: 2 May 1964 (age 62)
- Place of birth: Lurgan, Northern Ireland
- Height: 6 ft 0 in (1.83 m)
- Position: Forward

Youth career
- 1978–1982: Linfield

Senior career*
Years	Team	Apps	(Gls)
1982–1984	Linfield	6	(5)
1984	Motherwell	3	(0)
1984–1985	Linfield	0	(0)
1985–1996	Glenavon	260	(123)
1996–1998	Linfield	33	(8)
1998	Bangor	3	(1)
1998–1999	Crusaders	9	(0)
Total		314	(137)

International career
1990	Irish League XI	2	(0)
1990	Northern Ireland U23	1	(1)
1990–1991	Northern Ireland	4	(0)

Managerial career
- 2008–2009: Glenavon
- * Club domestic league appearances and goals

Stephen Derek McBride (born 2 May 1964 in Lurgan, Northern Ireland) is a former Northern Irish footballer.

== Managerial career ==
In August 2008, he succeeded Terry Cochrane as manager of his local and former team, Glenavon. However, with Glenavon languishing at the bottom of the IFA Premiership, McBride and Director of Football at the club, Alan Fraser were sacked on 28 January 2009. In August 2010, the former Glenavon and Linfield striker took over from Tony Bell at Mid Ulster league club Tandragee Rovers. A Club spokesman said of McBrides appointment, "We are delighted to get an A licence coach with his experience and high profile, we look forward to the Rovers going from strength to strength during the coming season."

== Representative Honours ==
- Northern Ireland: 4 Full Caps (1990–1991)
- 1 Under-23 Cap / 1 Goal (1990)
- Irish League: 2 Caps (1990).
- Club Honours: (with Glenavon) Irish Cup Runner-Up 1987/88, 1990/91, 1995/96;
- Irish League Cup Winner 1989/90;
- Floodlit Cup Winner 1988/89; Gold Cup Winner 1990/91;
- County Antrim Shield Winner 1990/91, 1995/96
- Steel and Sons Cup winner: Linfield Swifts 1983-84
- Mid-Ulster Cup Winner

== Awards ==
- Ulster Footballer of the Year 1990/91
- NI Football Writers’ Player of the Year 1991.

== Northern Ireland Cap Details ==
- 17-10-1990 - Denmark - H D 1-1 ECQ sub
- 06-02-1991 - Poland - H W 3-1 FR sub
- 11-09-1991 - Faroe Islands - A W 5-0 ECQ sub
- 13-11-1991 - Denmark - A L 1-2 ECQ

=== Summary ===
- 1(3)/0. Won 2, Drew 1, Lost 1.
