= North-South Cup =

Former football tournament in Ireland

- Organiser(s): Irish Football Association; Football Association of Ireland
- Founded: 1960
- Abolished: 1962
- Region: Northern Ireland; Republic of Ireland
- Most championships: Glenavon; Linfield (1 title each)

The North-South Cup was a short-lived football tournament featuring clubs from Northern Ireland and the Republic of Ireland. It was played for two seasons in the 1960s and on both occasions won by teams from Northern Ireland.

The 1960–61 competition was played to the semi-final stage, however due to fixture congestion the final had to be held over to the following season. Similarly the 1961–62 competition could not be finished in time, the first round and part of the second round were played during the season, however the rest was completed during the 1962–63 season.

== Finals ==
Season	Winner	Aggregate score	Runner-up
1960–61	(Northern Ireland) Linfield	7–1	(Northern Ireland) Glentoran
1961–62	(Northern Ireland) Glenavon	2–1	(Republic of Ireland) Shelbourne
