= Glenavon F.C. =

Association football club in Northern Ireland

Glenavon
- Full name: Glenavon Football Club
- Nicknames: Lurgan Blues; The Mourneview Aces
- Founded: November 1889; 136 years ago
- Ground: Mourneview Park, Lurgan; County Armagh
- Capacity: 3,200 seated
- Chairman: Stephen Best
- Manager: Michael O'Connor
- League: NIFL Championship
- 2025–26: NIFL Premiership, 12th of 12 (relegated)
- Website: glenavonfc.com
Home colours	Away colours	Third colours

Glenavon Football Club is a Northern Irish semi-professional football club that competes in the NIFL Championship. Founded in 1889, the club hails from Lurgan and plays its home matches at Mourneview Park. Club colours are blue and white. Glenavon's bitter rivals are Portadown, with their matches known as the "Mid-Ulster Derby". Glenavon are a part of the Mid-Ulster F.A.

== History ==
Glenavon was the first provincial club to win the Irish League title (1951–52) and also the first provincial club to do the league and cup double (1956–57). The latter triumph also made them the first Northern Irish team to enter the European Cup. Glenavon has had a number of famous players, none more so than Wilbur Cush and Jimmy Jones, who were to the fore in "the glory years" of the Fifties. The success of the 1950s is still the benchmark at the club – the closest the club have come to achieving a league success since came in the 1993–94 season, when but for two late goals in the final match Glenavon would have been crowned champions.

Glenavon enjoyed a good run throughout the 1990s, consistently achieving good placings in the league and winning several cup competitions, including Irish Cup wins in 1991–92 and 1996–97, and were runners-up against Glentoran in the 1995–96 and 1997–98 editions of the cup. The club then suffered a relatively poor spell during the early 2000s, which culminated in relegation to the second tier in the 2003–04 Irish League season. Although they were promoted the following season, Glenavon continued to struggle towards the bottom of the league throughout the remainder of the decade, going through several managers such as Terry Cochrane, Stephen McBride & Marty Quinn. McBride was a Northern Ireland international and a popular Glenavon player in the 1980s & 1990s, but his reign lasted just seven months before he was relieved of his managerial duties with Glenavon at the bottom of the IFA Premiership.

Former Portadown & Glentoran forward Gary Hamilton was appointed player-manager in December 2011, managing to steer the club from relegation in the remainder of the 2011–12 Irish League season. This was followed up by a 9th-place finish in the 2012–13 season. The 2013–14 season was welcomed by many as a successful season, the Lurgan club securing a top-six league finish and a return to winning major silverware with the 2013–14 Irish Cup, in which Glenavon triumphed 2–1 over Ballymena United in the final.

Following on from this cup triumph was a successful 2014–15 season. Though Glenavon did not fare as well in the Irish Cup, exiting at the 6th round to Championship 1 side Harland & Wolff Welders, an excellent late run of 7 consecutive wins saw the Lurgan Blues pip their Mid-Ulster rivals Portadown to a third-placed league finish, therefore sealing European football for the 2015–16 season.

The 2015–16 season would be another good season for the Lurgan Blues, once again securing Europe on the penultimate matchday by finishing third, on a points total of 69. Even more success was to follow, as the club claimed a second Irish Cup win in three years, defeating David Healy's Linfield 2–0 in the final.

Glenavon did not enjoy similar success in the 2016–17 season. Despite having signed former Celtic and Northern Ireland winger Paddy McCourt, the club struggled for form and could only achieve a disappointing 6th-placed finish in the league. Although the club reached the semi-finals of the Mid-Ulster Cup, League Cup and Irish Cup, they were defeated in all by Warrenpoint Town, Carrick Rangers and Coleraine respectively. Glenavon also suffered agonising defeat to Ballymena United in the Europa League playoff final, therefore missing out on a fourth successive year of European qualification.

Despite failure to qualify for Europe and a large exodus of players at the start of the 2017–18 season, the signing of players such as Sammy Clingan and Andrew Mitchell, aligned with the emergence of Bobby Burns, meant that Glenavon had a resurgence in form, finishing third once again, and qualifying for Europe. However, the only piece of silverware attained was the Mid-Ulster Cup, having exited the League Cup and Irish Cup via shock defeats at the hands of Ards and Loughgall.

While the 2018–19 season yielded a club-record points total of 70, the club had a disappointing record in the major cups, falling to defeat against Dergview and Dungannon Swifts in the League Cup and Irish Cup respectively. However, the Lurgan Blues did retain the Mid-Ulster Cup with a 4–3 victory over Warrenpoint Town. Despite attaining another third-place finish, Glenavon fell to a 2–4 defeat against Glentoran in the Europa League playoff semi-final and failed to attain European qualification for the following season.

The club endured a difficult 2019–20 campaign, falling to several heavy defeats in the league and exiting the Irish Cup at the 5th round with a 2–0 defeat against Coleraine. Inconsistent form meant that the club finished outside of the league's top-six for the first time since the 2012–13 season.

The Lurgan Blues' form improved significantly in the 2020–21 season, but the club narrowly missed out on a top-six finish; their final points total of 62 was the highest points tally recorded for a team in the bottom-six. Their seventh-place finish secured the Lurgan Blues a spot in the Europa Conference League playoffs. They faced Larne in the semi-final, losing narrowly to a Martin Donnelly goal in injury time, leaving Glenavon without European qualification.

The 2021–22 season saw the unexpected departure of the previous season's top scorer, Danny Purkis, but Glenavon would once again claim a seventh-place finish and qualification for the Europa Conference League playoffs. They were defeated at the semi-final stage, losing 2–0 against third-placed Glentoran at The Oval. The same opposition had eliminated Glenavon in the Irish League Cup earlier in the season. The Lurgan Blues exited the Irish Cup in controversial fashion, having had two goals disallowed against Crusaders.

On 13 September 2023, it was announced that Gary Hamilton had vacated the post of manager, following a number of poor results at the beginning of the 2023–24 season. U20s manager Gary McAlister took over as caretaker for matches against Carrick Rangers and Crusaders, and on 25 September, former Warrenpoint Town manager Stephen McDonnell was appointed in the role on a permanent basis. McDonnell steadied the ship at Glenavon and they ultimately avoided relegation from the NIFL Premiership that season, finishing 10th.

Though McDonnell staved off the threat of relegation in 2023–24, he was relieved of his duties as manager on 17 November 2024, after a poor start to the 2024–25 season. He was replaced in the role by former Institute and Cliftonville manager Paddy McLaughlin. Glenavon's form notably improved from December to February, with the prospect of a top-six finish becoming a possibility, but a poor ending to that season meant that Glenavon again finished 10th.

In spite of making several notable signings during the summer of 2025, including Stephen Mallon, Kyle McClelland and Francely Lomboto, Glenavon had a dismal start to the 2025–26 season, and McLaughlin departed the club on 28 September 2025 with the club having lost their opening nine league fixtures.

Former Glenavon midfielder and ex-Northern Ireland international Michael O'Connor became manager of the club on 11 October 2025. The Lurgan Blues' form improved under O'Connor, but a 1-0 defeat to Crusaders on 18 April 2026 confirmed the club's relegation to the NIFL Championship after a 21-year spell in the top-flight.

== Stadium ==
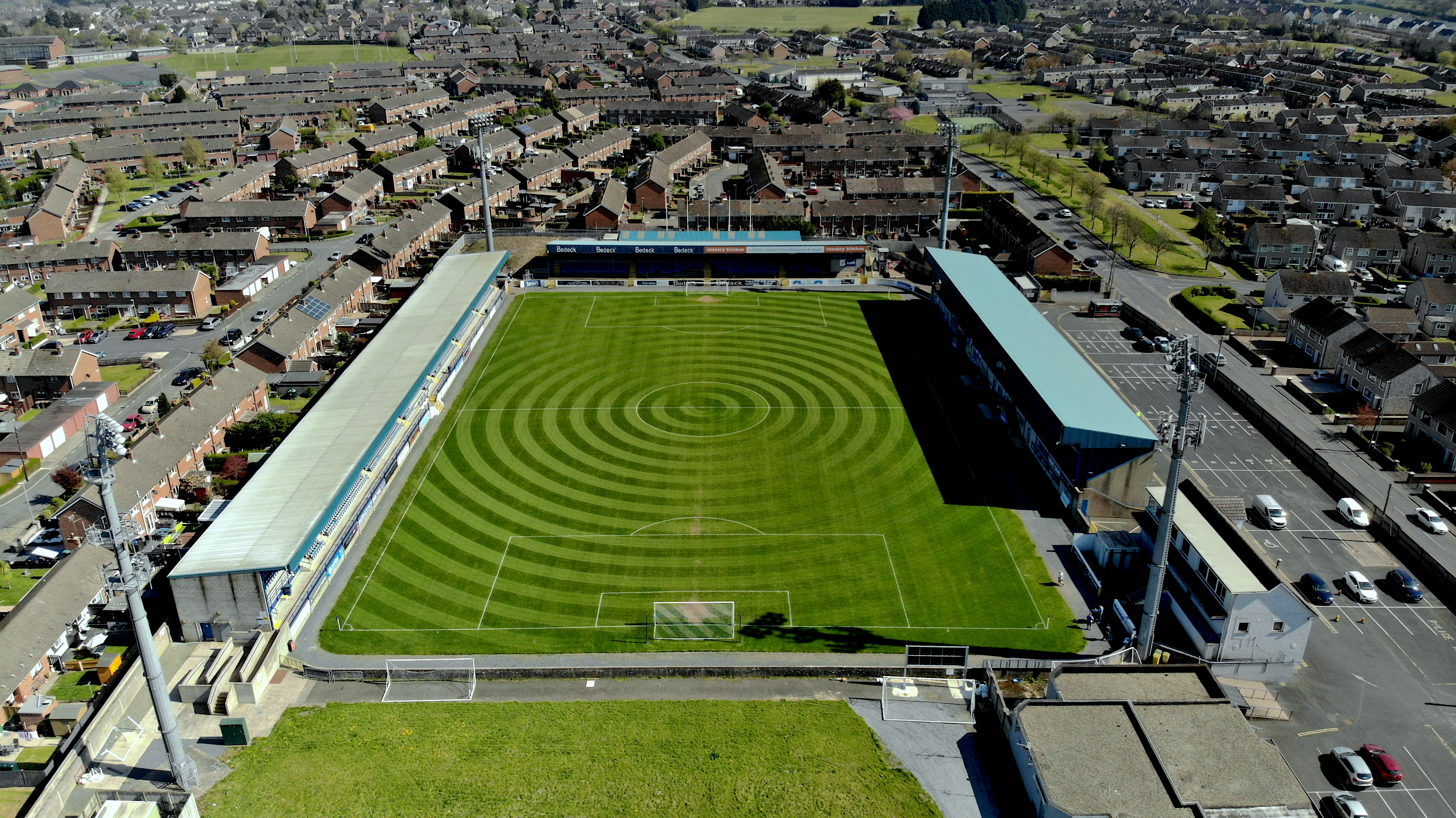
Mourneview Park in 2020.

Since 1895, Glenavon's home stadium has been Mourneview Park, located in the south of Lurgan.

From 1992 to 2011, significant alterations were made to Mourneview Park in order to bring the ground up to a modern standard. Along the side of the pitch runs the Geddis Stand (holds roughly 1700), and on the other side the Glenfield Road Stand (holds roughly 2000), which houses away supporters. Behind one of the goals, the ground has the Crescent End (standing terrace), and at the other end the Hospital End contains a training pitch.

In addition to Glenavon's home matches, the stadium is also a regular host for Northern Ireland under-21 matches, and was the venue for several group stage games in the UEFA Women's Under-19 Euro 2017 finals. Due to the ongoing renovation of Windsor Park, Mourneview Park was chosen as the venue for Linfield's home ties in the 2014–15 UEFA Europa League. The stadium has occasionally been used as a neutral ground for Irish Cup semi-finals, most recently in the 2018–19, 2020–21, and 2021–22 editions of the competition.

In September 2020, Glenavon FC unveiled a new 5m x 2m Digital LED Screen at Mourneview Park, which was supplied by FSL Scoreboards. It is the first of its kind anywhere in Ireland.

On 12 April 2021, it was announced that Mourneview Park would be the host venue for the 2020–21 Irish Cup Final; the first time the final has been staged outside of Belfast since 1975.

Mourneview Park hosted the second leg of the first round tie in the inaugural edition of the Europa Conference League between FK Velež Mostar and Coleraine F.C. on 15 July 2021, due to pitch redevelopments at The Showgrounds.

Prior to the 2023–24 season commencing, the seated area of the Crescent End was returned to a standing terrace, with the installation of crash barriers manufactured by local company, Dawson Manufacturing & Engineering.

== European record ==
Glenavon was the first Northern Irish team to enter the European Cup. In their first tie they drew AGF of Denmark, drawing 0–0 at home and losing 0–3 away.

Glenavon achieved some more notable results in Europe in the 1990s. In the 1992–93 season, they drew both legs of their Cup Winners Cup tie with Royal Antwerp and lost on penalties. In 1995–96 they reached the first round proper of the UEFA Cup (the last Irish League club to do so), and were beaten by Werder Bremen.

=== Overview ===
Competition	Matches	W	D	L	GF	GA
European Cup	2	0	1	1	0	3
UEFA Cup / UEFA Europa League	20	2	2	16	10	49
European Cup Winners' Cup / UEFA Cup Winners' Cup	10	1	3	6	11	25
UEFA Intertoto Cup	2	0	1	1	1	4
TOTAL	34	3	7	24	22	81

=== Matches ===
Season	Competition	Round	Opponent	Home	Away	Aggregate
1957–58	European Cup	PR	(Denmark) AGF	0–3	0–0	0–3
1960–61	European Cup	PR	(East Germany) Wismut Karl Marx Stadt	w/o		N/A
1961–62	European Cup Winners' Cup	PR	(England) Leicester City	1–4	1–3	2–7
1977–78	UEFA Cup	1R	(Netherlands) PSV Eindhoven	2–6	0–5	2–11
1979–80	UEFA Cup	1R	(Belgium) Standard Liège	0–1	0–1	0–2
1988–89	European Cup Winners' Cup	1R	(Denmark) AGF	1–4	1–3	2–7
1990–91	UEFA Cup	1R	(France) Bordeaux	0–0	0–2	0–2
1991–92	European Cup Winners' Cup	1R	(Finland) Ilves	3–2	1–2	4–4 (a)
1992–93	European Cup Winners' Cup	1R	(Belgium) Royal Antwerp	1–1	1–1	2–2 (1–3 p)
1995–96	UEFA Cup	PR	(Iceland) FH	0–0	1–0	1–0
1995–96	UEFA Cup	1R	(Germany) Werder Bremen	0–2	0–5	0–7
1997–98	UEFA Cup Winners' Cup	QR	(Poland) Legia Warsaw	1–1	0–4	1–5
2000	UEFA Intertoto Cup	1R	(Croatia) Slaven Belupo	1–1	0–3	1–4
2001–02	UEFA Cup	QR	(Scotland) Kilmarnock	0–1	0–1	0–2
2014–15	UEFA Europa League	1QR	(Iceland) FH	0–3	2–3	2–6
2015–16	UEFA Europa League	1QR	(Belarus) Shakhtyor Soligorsk	1–2	0–3	1–5
2016–17	UEFA Europa League	1QR	(Iceland) KR Reykjavik	1–2	0–6	1–8
2018–19	UEFA Europa League	1QR	(Norway) Molde	2−1	1–5	3–6

== Current squad ==
Note: Flags indicate national team as defined under FIFA eligibility rules; some limited exceptions apply. Players may hold more than one non-FIFA nationality.

No.	Pos.	Nation	Player
1	GK	NIR	Lorcan Donnelly (on loan from Glentoran)
2	DF	NIR	Jordan McMullan
3	DF	NIR	Patrick Burns
4	DF	NIR	Harry Murphy
6	DF	IRL	John Mountney
7	FW	NIR	Ryan Waide
8	MF	NIR	Luke McGerrigan
9	FW	NIR	Brandon Doyle
10	MF	NIR	Peter Campbell
11	FW	NIR	Ethan Devine
12	MF	NIR	Mark Patton
13	GK	IRL	Mark Byrne

No.	Pos.	Nation	Player
14	DF	NIR	Oran O'Kane
15	DF	NIR	Luke Cartwright
16	MF	NIR	Deaglan Healy
17	MF	IRL	Stephen Mallon
18	MF	NIR	Jack Henderson
19	MF	NIR	Jude Johnson (on loan from Glentoran)
24	DF	IRL	Peter Maguire
27	MF	NIR	Alex Watson (on loan from Coleraine)
31	DF	NIR	Niall Quinn
33	DF	NIR	James Heaney
36	DF	NIR	Andrew Doyle (player-coach)

=== On Loan ===
Note: Flags indicate national team as defined under FIFA eligibility rules; some limited exceptions apply. Players may hold more than one non-FIFA nationality.

No.	Pos.	Nation	Player
26	DF	NIR	Charlie McShane (On loan at Rosario until 1st July 2027)
30	GK	NIR	Sean Hamill (On loan at Coagh United until 1st July 2027)

== Non-playing staff ==
Position	Staff
Manager	Michael O'Connor
Assistant manager	Andrew Doyle
First-team coach	Mark Ferguson
Goalkeeping coaches	Reggie Hillen and Johnny Pollock
First Team Analyst	Paul McCrum
U20 Manager	Tim Lennon
Head of Academy	Ryan Prentice

== Academy ==
Glenavon's Academy consists of teams at Under 7, Under 8, Under 9, Under 10, Under 11, Under 12, Under 13, Under 14, Under 15, Under 16 and Under 18. There is also an Under 20 development team which comes under the auspices of the Senior Club and plays as Glenavon Reserves.

The academy was formed in 2007 as a result of the Irish league licensing requirements and then first team manager Colin Malone appointed Gordon Wylie as Academy co-ordinator. Gordon's first task was to bring ex Glenavon legend Stephen McBride back to the club as the academy head coach.

The Glenavon Academy is now headed by Ryan Prentice after previously being led by Alex Denver, Thomas McStravick and Chris Chambers. The academy currently has a number of UEFA A Licence and UEFA B Licence coaches.

In recent times the club has introduced various coaching programmes and training camps aimed at increasing the numbers within the academy. These have included the Glenavon Academy Club Affiliation Programme, Schools Programme, Aces, Girls Football and annual Football Camps at Easter, Summer and Halloween.

== Managerial history ==
- (Northern Ireland) Harry Walker (1950–54)
- (Northern Ireland) Jimmy McAlinden (1954–68)
- (Northern Ireland) Ted Smyth (1968)
- (Northern Ireland) Joe Kinkead (1968–69)
- (Northern Ireland) Jimmy Jones (1969–72)
- (Northern Ireland) Eric Adair (1972–73)
- (Northern Ireland) Brian Campbell (1974–75)
- (Northern Ireland) Alan Campbell (1975–78)
- (Northern Ireland) Billy McClatchey (1978–79)
- (Scotland) Billy Sinclair (1979–82)
- (Northern Ireland) Terry Nicholson (1982–91)
- (Northern Ireland) Alan Fraser (1991–94)
- (Northern Ireland) Nigel Best (1994–98)
- (Northern Ireland) Billy Hamilton (1998)
- (Northern Ireland) Roy Walker (1998–00)
- (Northern Ireland) Colin Malone (2000–03)
- (Northern Ireland) Alfie Wylie (2003–04)
- (Northern Ireland) Tommy Kincaid (2004–05)
- (Northern Ireland) Jimmy Brown (2005–06)
- (Northern Ireland) Colin Malone (2006–07)
- (Northern Ireland) Terry Cochrane (2008)
- (Northern Ireland) Stephen McBride (2008–09)
- (Northern Ireland) Marty Quinn (2009–11)
- (Northern Ireland) Gary Hamilton (2011–23)
- (Republic of Ireland) Stephen McDonnell (2023–24)
- (Northern Ireland) Paddy McLaughlin (2024–25)
- (Northern Ireland) Michael O'Connor (2025–)

== Honours ==
=== Senior honours ===
- Irish League: 3
  - 1951–52, 1956–57, 1959–60
- Irish Cup: 7
  - 1956–57, 1958–59, 1960–61, 1991–92, 1996–97, 2013–14, 2015–16
- Northern Ireland Football League Cup: 1
  - 1989–90
- County Antrim Shield: 2
  - 1990–91, 1995–96
- Charity Shield: 2
  - 1992 (shared), 2016
- Mid-Ulster Cup: 27
  - 1897–98, 1901–02, 1904–05, 1906–07, 1908–09, 1910–11, 1924–25, 1925–26, 1930–31, 1932–33, 1937–38, 1947–48†, 1957–58†, 1965–66†, 1971–72†, 1976–77†, 1983–84, 1985–86, 1988–89, 1990–91, 1998–99, 2004–05, 2009–10, 2010–11, 2017–18, 2018–19, 2020–21
- City Cup: 5
  - 1920–21, 1954–55, 1955–56, 1960–61, 1965–66
- Gold Cup: 4
  - 1954–55, 1956–57, 1990–91, 1997–98
- Ulster Cup: 3
  - 1954–55, 1958–59, 1962–63
- Floodlit Cup: 2
  - 1988–89, 1996–97
- North-South Cup: 1
  - 1961–62 (Note: The 1961–62 North-South Cup could not be finished in time. The first round and part of the second round were played in this season, with the rest completed in the 1962–63 season. The Cup started in February 1962 and was completed in May 1963.)

† Won by Glenavon Reserves

=== Intermediate honours ===
- Irish Intermediate Cup: 3
  - 1907–08, 1910–11, 2004–05
- George Wilson Cup: 1
  - 1963–64†
- Bob Radcliffe Cup: 1
  - 1990–91†

† Won by Glenavon Reserves

=== Junior honours ===
- Irish Junior League: 2
  - 1907–08, 1910–11
- Irish Junior Cup: 1
  - 1897–98
- Beattie Cup: 1
  - 1929–30†

† Won by Glenavon Reserves
