= 1951–52 Rochdale A.F.C. season =

English football club season

Rochdale
1951–52 season
- Manager: Ted Goodier
- Stadium: Spotland Stadium
- Division 3 North: 21st
- F.A. Cup: 3rd Round
- Top goalscorer: League: Alan Middlebrough; Bert Foulds; All: Alan Middlebrough; Bert Foulds
Home colours

The 1951–52 season was Rochdale A.F.C.'s 45th in existence and their 24th in the Football League Third Division North.

== Squad statistics ==
=== Appearances and goals (Competitive) ===
No.	Pos	Nat	Player	Total		Division 3 North		F.A. Cup	
No.	Pos	Nat	Player	Apps	Goals	Apps	Goals	Apps	Goals
	GK	(England) ENG	Trevor Churchill	19	0	19	0	0	0
	DF	(England) ENG	Bill Watson	37	0	35	0	2	0
	DF	(England) ENG	Fred Fisher	1	0	1	0	0	0
	MF	(England) ENG	Harry Whitworth	32	2	31	2	1	0
	DF	(England) ENG	Wally Birch	23	0	23	0	0	0
	MF	(Scotland) SCO	Alistair Buchan	41	1	38	1	3	0
	MF	(England) ENG	Eric Barber	12	1	12	1	0	0
	FW	(England) ENG	Jimmy Whitehouse	14	4	14	4	0	0
	FW	(England) ENG	Bill Jennings	3	1	3	1	0	0
	MF	(England) ENG	Joe Lynn	34	1	31	1	3	0
	MF	(England) ENG	Alan Steen	13	3	13	3	0	0
	DF	(England) ENG	Arthur Radford	30	0	27	0	3	0
	FW	(England) ENG	Jim Hazzleton	11	1	11	1	0	0
	MF	(Scotland) SCO	Jim Drury	4	1	4	1	0	0
	MF	(England) ENG	Eric Hayton	12	0	12	0	0	0
	MF	(England) ENG	Jackie Arthur	28	3	25	2	3	1
	FW	(England) ENG	Alan Middlebrough	23	10	20	10	3	0
	GK	(England) ENG	Jim Nicholls	30	0	27	0	3	0
	DF	(England) ENG	Eric Downes	32	0	29	0	3	0
	DF	(England) ENG	Ron Rothwell	13	0	13	0	0	0
	FW	(Scotland) SCO	Bobby Gilfillan	12	1	12	1	0	0
	DF	(England) ENG	Joe Coupe	8	0	8	0	0	0
	MF	(England) ENG	Eric Betts	29	6	26	4	3	2
	FW	(England) ENG	Walter Keeley	5	0	4	0	1	0
	FW	(England) ENG	Bert Foulds	26	10	23	10	3	0
	MF	(England) ENG	Frank Tomlinson	22	4	20	2	2	2
	FW	(England) ENG	Alan Ball	5	1	5	1	0	0
	FW	(England) ENG	Norman Case	2	0	2	0	0	0
	MF	(England) ENG	Tom Hindle	6	1	6	1	0	0
	MF	(England) ENG	Don Partridge	11	1	11	1	0	0

=== Appearances and goals (Non-competitive) ===
No.	Pos	Nat	Player	Total		Lancashire Cup	
No.	Pos	Nat	Player	Apps	Goals	Apps	Goals
	GK	(England) ENG	Trevor Churchill	0	0	0	0
	DF	(England) ENG	Bill Watson	0	0	0	0
	DF	(England) ENG	Fred Fisher	1	0	1	0
	MF	(England) ENG	Harry Whitworth	1	0	1	0
	DF	(England) ENG	Wally Birch	1	0	1	0
	MF	(Scotland) SCO	Alistair Buchan	1	0	1	0
	MF	(England) ENG	Eric Barber	0	0	0	0
	FW	(England) ENG	Jimmy Whitehouse	1	0	1	0
	FW	(England) ENG	Bill Jennings	0	0	0	0
	MF	(England) ENG	Joe Lynn	0	0	0	0
	MF	(England) ENG	Alan Steen	1	0	1	0
	DF	(England) ENG	Arthur Radford	1	0	1	0
	FW	(England) ENG	Jim Hazzleton	1	0	1	0
	MF	(Scotland) SCO	Jim Drury	0	0	0	0
	MF	(England) ENG	Eric Hayton	1	0	1	0
	MF	(England) ENG	Jackie Arthur	1	0	1	0
	FW	(England) ENG	Alan Middlebrough	0	0	0	0
	GK	(England) ENG	Jim Nicholls	1	0	1	0
	DF	(England) ENG	Eric Downes	0	0	0	0
	DF	(England) ENG	Ron Rothwell	0	0	0	0
	FW	(Scotland) SCO	Bobby Gilfillan	0	0	0	0
	DF	(England) ENG	Joe Coupe	0	0	0	0
	MF	(England) ENG	Eric Betts	0	0	0	0
	FW	(England) ENG	Walter Keeley	0	0	0	0
	FW	(England) ENG	Bert Foulds	0	0	0	0
	MF	(England) ENG	Frank Tomlinson	0	0	0	0
	FW	(England) ENG	Alan Ball	0	0	0	0
	FW	(England) ENG	Norman Case	0	0	0	0
	MF	(England) ENG	Tom Hindle	0	0	0	0
	MF	(England) ENG	Don Partridge	0	0	0	0

== Final League Table ==
Pos	Team	Pld	W	D	L	GF	GA	GAv	Pts	Promotion
19	Chester	46	15	9	22	72	85	0.847	39	
20	Halifax Town	46	14	7	25	61	97	0.629	35	
21	Rochdale	46	11	13	22	47	79	0.595	35	
22	Accrington Stanley	46	10	12	24	61	92	0.663	32	
23	Darlington	46	11	9	26	64	103	0.621	31	Re-elected

Source: rsssf.com

== Competitions ==
=== Football League Third Division North ===
18 August 1951 1	Rochdale	0–4	Carlisle United	Rochdale
		Report	Ashman; Hogan	Stadium: Spotland Stadium; Attendance: 6026; Referee: A Brown

22 August 1951 2	Darlington	2–1	Rochdale	Darlington
	Johnston; Yates	Report	Jennings	Stadium: Feethams; Attendance: 5962; Referee: T Seymour

25 August 1951 3	Stockport County	1–0	Rochdale	Stockport
	Weigh	Report		Stadium: Edgeley Park; Attendance: 9544; Referee: SM Rogers

28 August 1951 4	Rochdale	6–2	Darlington	Rochdale
	Middlebrough; Whitehouse; Steen	Report	Wardle; Clarke	Stadium: Spotland Stadium; Attendance: 4727; Referee: T Seymour

1 September 1951 5	Rochdale	2–0	Workington	Rochdale
	Middlebrough; Whitehouse	Report		Stadium: Spotland Stadium; Attendance: 5701; Referee: G Black

4 September 1951 6	Rochdale	1–0	Mansfield Town	Rochdale
	Arthur (pen.)	Report		Stadium: Spotland Stadium; Attendance: 6046; Referee: A Holland

8 September 1951 7	Barrow	4–0	Rochdale	Barrow-in-Furness
	Hannah; King; Layton; McLaren	Report		Stadium: Holker Street; Attendance: 7326; Referee: F Thurman

15 September 1951 8	Rochdale	0–0	Grimsby Town	Rochdale
		Report		Stadium: Spotland Stadium; Attendance: 6181; Referee: BJ Flanagan

17 September 1951 9	Mansfield Town	1–1	Rochdale	Mansfield
	Ottewell	Report	Whitehouse	Stadium: Field Mill; Attendance: 10413; Referee: A Holland

22 September 1951 10	Wrexham	2–0	Rochdale	Wrexham
	Lawrence; Hewitt	Report		Stadium: Racecourse Ground; Attendance: 7359; Referee: KA Collinge

29 September 1951 11	Rochdale	2–0	Chesterfield	Rochdale
	Whitehouse; Barber	Report		Stadium: Spotland Stadium; Attendance: 6496; Referee: C Fletcher

6 October 1951 12	Rochdale	3–0	Hartlepools United	Rochdale
	Whitworth; Hazzleton; Steen	Report		Stadium: Spotland Stadium; Attendance: 5574; Referee: L Howarth

13 October 1951 13	Bradford City	3–0	Rochdale	Bradford
	Ward; McCulloch	Report		Stadium: Valley Parade; Attendance: 13505; Referee: R Wood

20 October 1951 14	Rochdale	0–2	York City	Rochdale
		Report	Fenton; Spence	Stadium: Spotland Stadium; Attendance: 4994; Referee: H Beacock

27 October 1951 15	Chester	4–0	Rochdale	Chester
	Astbury; Fletcher; Kirkpatrick	Report		Stadium: Sealand Road; Attendance: 4628; Referee: WHE Evans

3 November 1951 16	Rochdale	0–1	Lincoln City	Rochdale
		Report	Graver	Stadium: Spotland Stadium; Attendance: 2457; Referee: LN Peake

10 November 1951 17	Scunthorpe & Lindsey United	3–1	Rochdale	Scunthorpe
	Powell; Taylor (pen.); Cumner	Report	Betts	Stadium: Old Show Ground; Attendance: 8374; Referee: P Rhodes

17 November 1951 18	Rochdale	3–2	Tranmere Rovers	Rochdale
	Tomlinson; Middlebrough	Report	Dillon	Stadium: Spotland Stadium; Attendance: 4158; Referee: G Black

1 December 1951 19	Rochdale	1–0	Crewe Alexandra	Rochdale
	Foulds	Report		Stadium: Spotland Stadium; Attendance: 4278; Referee: E Plinston

8 December 1951 20	Gateshead	1–0	Rochdale	Gateshead
	Winters	Report		Stadium: Redheugh Park; Attendance: 6055; Referee: T Seymour

22 December 1951 21	Rochdale	0–0	Stockport County	Rochdale
		Report		Stadium: Spotland Stadium; Attendance: 5857; Referee: SM Rogers

25 December 1951 22	Oldham Athletic	1–1	Rochdale	Oldham
	Gemmell	Report	Betts	Stadium: Boundary Park; Attendance: 23001; Referee: E Plinston

26 December 1951 23	Rochdale	2–2	Oldham Athletic	Rochdale
	Tomlinson; Foulds	Report	Munro; McIlvenny	Stadium: Spotland Stadium; Attendance: 12430; Referee: E Plinston

29 December 1951 24	Workington	1–1	Rochdale	Workington
	McDowall	Report	Middlebrough	Stadium: Borough Park; Attendance: 6244; Referee: G Black

5 January 1952 25	Rochdale	4–1	Barrow	Rochdale
	Foulds; Middlebrough	Report	Layton	Stadium: Spotland Stadium; Attendance: 5451; Referee: F Thurman

15 January 1952 26	Rochdale	3–1	Accrington Stanley	Rochdale
	Betts; Middlebrough; Foulds	Report	Watkinson	Stadium: Spotland Stadium; Attendance: 1792; Referee: JW Topliss

19 January 1952 27	Grimsby Town	4–0	Rochdale	Cleethorpes
	Maddison; Johnston; Bloomer	Report		Stadium: Blundell Park; Attendance: 12780; Referee: BJ Flanagan

26 January 1952 28	Rochdale	1–5	Wrexham	Rochdale
	Buchan	Report	Hope; Hewitt; Bannan	Stadium: Spotland Stadium; Attendance: 4244; Referee: KA Collinge

9 February 1952 29	Chesterfield	5–1	Rochdale	Chesterfield
	Harvey; Southall; Smith	Report	Ball	Stadium: Saltergate Recreation Ground; Attendance: 9055; Referee: C Fletcher

16 February 1952 30	Hartlepools United	1–1	Rochdale	Hartlepool
	Elder	Report	Betts	Stadium: Victoria Park; Attendance: 8403; Referee: L Howarth

23 February 1952 31	Rochdale	0–2	Halifax Town	Rochdale
		Report	Frost; McCaig	Stadium: Spotland Stadium; Attendance: 5703; Referee: A Brown

1 March 1952 32	Rochdale	1–1	Bradford City	Rochdale
	Foulds	Report	Carr	Stadium: Spotland Stadium; Attendance: 4274; Referee: R Wood

6 March 1952 33	Carlisle United	1–1	Rochdale	Carlisle
	Whitehouse	Report	Hindle	Stadium: Brunton Park; Attendance: 3978

8 March 1952 34	York City	1–1	Rochdale	York
	Griffiths	Report	Foulds	Stadium: Bootham Crescent; Attendance: 8136; Referee: H Beacock

15 March 1952 35	Rochdale	0–5	Chester	Rochdale
		Report	Kirkpatrick; Stiffle; Astbury; Travis	Stadium: Spotland Stadium; Attendance: 4561; Referee: WHE Evans

22 March 1952 36	Lincoln City	2–0	Rochdale	Lincoln
	Gibson	Report		Stadium: Sincil Bank; Attendance: 13646; Referee: LN Peake

29 March 1952 37	Rochdale	1–2	Scunthorpe & Lindsey United	Rochdale
	Whitworth	Report	Wallace; Ottewell	Stadium: Spotland Stadium; Attendance: 1226; Referee: P Rhodes

2 April 1952 38	Accrington Stanley	0–0	Rochdale	Accrington
		Report		Stadium: Peel Park; Attendance: 4081; Referee: T Seymour

5 April 1952 39	Tranmere Rovers	4–3	Rochdale	Birkenhead
	Atkinson; Davies; Eastham	Report	Gilfillan; Drury; Lynn (pen.)	Stadium: Prenton Park; Attendance: 3400; Referee: G Black

12 April 1952 40	Rochdale	1–0	Southport	Rochdale
	Foulds	Report		Stadium: Spotland Stadium; Attendance: 3916; Referee: J Houston

14 April 1952 41	Rochdale	1–1	Bradford Park Avenue	Rochdale
	Partridge	Report	Wright	Stadium: Spotland Stadium; Attendance: 5540; Referee: J McCann

15 April 1952 42	Bradford Park Avenue	1–1	Rochdale	Bradford
	Smith	Report	Arthur (pen.)	Stadium: Park Avenue; Attendance: 10235

19 April 1952 43	Crewe Alexandra	1–0	Rochdale	Crewe
	Basford	Report		Stadium: Gresty Road; Attendance: 4055; Referee: E Plinston

22 April 1952 44	Southport	1–2	Rochdale	Southport
	Billingham	Report	Foulds	Stadium: Haig Avenue; Attendance: 2872

26 April 1952 45	Rochdale	0–3	Gateshead	Rochdale
		Report	Callender; Wilbert	Stadium: Spotland Stadium; Attendance: 3174; Referee: T Seymour

28 April 1952 46	Halifax Town	1–0	Rochdale	Halifax
	Priestley	Report		Stadium: The Shay; Attendance: 5635

=== F.A. Cup ===
24 November 1951 1	Ilkeston Town	0–2	Rochdale	Ilkeston
	Burrows (red card)	Report	Betts (pen.); Middlebrough (red card)	Stadium: Manor Ground; Attendance: 9000; Referee: R Turner

15 December 1952 2	Gillingham	0–3	Rochdale	Gillingham
		Report	Tomlinson; Arthur	Stadium: Priestfield Stadium; Attendance: 15686

12 January 1952 3	Rochdale	0–2	Leeds United	Rochdale
		Report	Kirk	Stadium: Spotland Stadium; Attendance: 21526; Referee: LAM Mackay

=== Lancashire Cup ===
11 October 1951	Preston North End	1–0	Rochdale	Preston
	Goal			Stadium: Deepdale; Attendance: ?
