= 1950–51 Rochdale A.F.C. season =

English football club season

Rochdale
1950–51 season
- Manager: Ted Goodier
- Stadium: Spotland Stadium
- Division 3 North: 11th
- F.A. Cup: 3rd Round
- Top goalscorer: League: Jack Connor; All: Jack Connor

The 1950–51 season was Rochdale A.F.C.'s 44th in existence and their 23rd in the Football League Third Division North.

== Squad Statistics ==
=== Appearances and goals ===
No.	Pos	Nat	Player	Total		Division 3 North		F.A. Cup	
No.	Pos	Nat	Player	Apps	Goals	Apps	Goals	Apps	Goals
	GK	(England) ENG	Trevor Churchill	28	0	28	0	0	0
	DF	(England) ENG	Bill Watson	44	0	42	0	2	0
	DF	(England) ENG	Harry Hubbick	29	0	29	0	0	0
	MF	(Scotland) SCO	George McGeachie	41	4	38	4	3	0
	DF	(England) ENG	Wally Birch	46	1	43	1	3	0
	MF	(Scotland) SCO	David Reid	9	0	9	0	0	0
	MF	(England) ENG	Jackie Arthur	38	5	35	4	3	1
	FW	(England) ENG	Jack Livesey	41	12	38	11	3	1
	FW	(England) ENG	Jack Connor	27	17	26	16	1	1
	FW	(England) ENG	Cyril Brown	24	3	22	3	2	0
	MF	(England) ENG	Alan Steen	35	6	32	5	3	1
	GK	(England) ENG	Bert Lomas	12	0	9	0	3	0
	FW	(England) ENG	Jimmy Whitehouse	34	11	32	9	2	2
	MF	(England) ENG	Gordon Medd	5	1	5	1	0	0
	GK	(Wales) WAL	Archie Hughes	9	0	9	0	0	0
	MF	(England) ENG	Eric Wood	9	0	8	0	1	0
	MF	(England) ENG	Don Partridge	6	0	5	0	1	0
	FW	(England) ENG	Bert Foulds	6	1	6	1	0	0
	MF	(England) ENG	Bob Smyth	3	1	3	1	0	0
	FW	(England) ENG	Alan Middlebrough	17	10	15	9	2	1
	DF	(Scotland) SCO	Harry Boyle	20	0	17	0	3	0
	DF	(England) ENG	Ron Rothwell	2	0	2	0	0	0
	MF	(England) ENG	Bill Heaton	6	0	5	0	1	0
	MF	(England) ENG	Ken Crowther	2	0	2	0	0	0
	FW	(Scotland) SCO	Alex McNichol	17	3	17	3	0	0
	MF	(Scotland) SCO	Alastair Buchan	19	0	19	0	0	0
	DF	(England) ENG	Eric Downes	4	0	4	0	0	0
	MF	(England) ENG	Eric Barber	5	1	5	1	0	0
	FW	(England) ENG	Harry Mills	1	0	1	0	0	0

=== Appearances and goals (Non-competitive) ===
No.	Pos	Nat	Player	Total		Lancashire Cup	
No.	Pos	Nat	Player	Apps	Goals	Apps	Goals
	GK	(England) ENG	Trevor Churchill	0	0	0	0
	DF	(England) ENG	Bill Watson	0	0	0	0
	DF	(England) ENG	Harry Hubbick	1	0	1	0
	MF	(Scotland) SCO	George McGeachie	1	0	1	0
	DF	(England) ENG	Wally Birch	0	0	0	0
	MF	(Scotland) SCO	David Reid	0	0	0	0
	MF	(England) ENG	Jackie Arthur	1	0	1	0
	FW	(England) ENG	Jack Livesey	1	0	1	0
	FW	(England) ENG	Jack Connor	0	0	0	0
	FW	(England) ENG	Cyril Brown	0	0	0	0
	MF	(England) ENG	Alan Steen	0	0	0	0
	GK	(England) ENG	Bert Lomas	0	0	0	0
	FW	(England) ENG	Jimmy Whitehouse	1	0	1	0
	MF	(England) ENG	Gordon Medd	0	0	0	0
	GK	(Wales) WAL	Archie Hughes	1	0	1	0
	MF	(England) ENG	Eric Wood	0	0	0	0
	MF	(England) ENG	Don Partridge	1	0	1	0
	FW	(England) ENG	Bert Foulds	1	0	1	0
	MF	(England) ENG	Bob Smyth	1	0	1	0
	FW	(England) ENG	Alan Middlebrough	1	1	1	1
	DF	(Scotland) SCO	Harry Boyle	0	0	0	0
	DF	(England) ENG	Ron Rothwell	1	0	1	0
	MF	(England) ENG	Bill Heaton	0	0	0	0
	MF	(England) ENG	Ken Crowther	0	0	0	0
	FW	(Scotland) SCO	Alex McNichol	0	0	0	0
	MF	(Scotland) SCO	Alastair Buchan	0	0	0	0
	DF	(England) ENG	Eric Downes	0	0	0	0
	MF	(England) ENG	Eric Barber	0	0	0	0
	FW	(England) ENG	Harry Mills	0	0	0	0

== Final league table ==
Pos	Team	Pld	W	D	L	GF	GA	GAv	Pts
9	Crewe Alexandra	46	19	10	17	61	60	1.017	48
10	Stockport County	46	20	8	18	63	63	1.000	48
11	Rochdale	46	17	11	18	69	62	1.113	45
12	Scunthorpe & Lindsey United	46	13	18	15	58	57	1.018	44
13	Chester	46	17	9	20	62	64	0.969	43

Source: rsssf.com

== Competitions ==
=== Football League Third Division North ===
19 August 1950 1	Darlington	0–2	Rochdale	Darlington
		Report	Connor; Arthur	Stadium: Feethams; Attendance: 10530; Referee: F. Walton

21 August 1950 2	Bradford Park Avenue	0–1	Rochdale	Bradford
		Report	Arthur	Stadium: Park Avenue; Attendance: 19058; Referee: HT Wright

26 August 1950 3	Rochdale	1–1	Stockport County	Rochdale
	Livesey	Report	Black	Stadium: Spotland Stadium; Attendance: 13075; Referee: J McCann

29 August 1950 4	Rochdale	1–2	Bradford Park Avenue	Rochdale
	Livesey	Report	Elliott; Wheat	Stadium: Spotland Stadium; Attendance: 10743; Referee: HT Wright

2 September 1950 5	Halifax Town	1–1	Rochdale	Halifax
	Core	Report	Connor	Stadium: The Shay; Attendance: 10219; Referee: C Fletcher

5 September 1950 6	Rochdale	5–0	Shrewsbury Town	Rochdale
	Medd; Connor; Livesey	Report		Stadium: Spotland Stadium; Attendance: 8863; Referee: KA Collinge

9 September 1950 7	Rochdale	3–1	Hartlepools United	Rochdale
	Connor; Whitehouse	Report	McGuigan	Stadium: Spotland Stadium; Attendance: 9146; Referee: WHE Evans

11 September 1950 8	Shrewsbury Town	0–2	Rochdale	Shrewsbury
		Report	Connor	Stadium: Gay Meadow; Attendance: 8017; Referee: KA Collinge

16 September 1950 9	Gateshead	4–1	Rochdale	Gateshead
	Wilbert; Winters; Callender (pen.)	Report	Whitehouse	Stadium: Redheugh Park; Attendance: 13607; Referee: PF Power

23 September 1950 10	Rochdale	1–1	Crewe Alexandra	Rochdale
	McGeachie	Report	Phillips	Stadium: Spotland Stadium; Attendance: 8576; Referee: WHE Evans

30 September 1950 11	New Brighton	1–5	Rochdale	New Brighton
	Carter	Report	Steen; Livesey; McGeachie (pen.) (pen.); Brown	Stadium: Tower Athletic Ground; Attendance: 4852; Referee: J Houston

7 October 1950 12	Rochdale	0–1	York City	Rochdale
		Report	Linaker	Stadium: Spotland Stadium; Attendance: 8123; Referee: A Holland

14 October 1950 13	Barrow	4–3	Rochdale	Barrow-in-Furness
	Keen; Miller; King	Report	Whitehouse; Middlebrough; Brown	Stadium: Holker Street; Attendance: 5645; Referee: F Thurman

21 October 1950 14	Rochdale	3–1	Accrington Stanley	Rochdale
	Connor; Birch (pen.); Smyth	Report	Keeley	Stadium: Spotland Stadium; Attendance: 8027; Referee: H Jackson

28 October 1950 15	Carlisle United	4–0	Rochdale	Carlisle
	Brown; McCue; Turner	Report		Stadium: Brunton Park; Attendance: 13295; Referee: J Bell

4 November 1950 16	Rochdale	2–3	Tranmere Rovers	Rochdale
	Arthur; Livesey	Report	Rosenthal; Wheeler; Bell	Stadium: Spotland Stadium; Attendance: 7886; Referee: HT Wright

11 November 1950 17	Southport	1–1	Rochdale	Southport
	Rothwell	Report	Brown	Stadium: Haig Avenue; Attendance: 6374; Referee: J Platt

18 November 1950 18	Rochdale	0–2	Rotherham United	Rochdale
		Report	Grainger; Guest	Stadium: Spotland Stadium; Attendance: 7986; Referee: FL Overton

2 December 1950 19	Rochdale	2–0	Scunthorpe & Lindsey United	Rochdale
	Middlebrough	Report		Stadium: Spotland Stadium; Attendance: 5213; Referee: H Jackson

23 December 1950 20	Stockport County	2–2	Rochdale	Stockport
	Dick; Black	Report	Whitehouse; Middlebrough	Stadium: Edgeley Park; Attendance: 10152; Referee: J McCann

25 December 1950 21	Lincoln City	4–2	Rochdale	Lincoln
	Finch 7', 32', 60'; Garvie 54'	Report	Arthur 45'; Middlebrough 65'	Stadium: Sincil Bank; Attendance: 9873; Referee: T Seymour

13 January 1951 22	Hartlepools United	0–0	Rochdale	Hartlepool
		Report		Stadium: Victoria Park; Attendance: 7585; Referee: H Beacock

16 January 1951 23	Rochdale	2–3	Chester	Rochdale
	Steen; Whitehouse	Report	Burgess; Devonshire	Stadium: Spotland Stadium; Attendance: 1435

20 January 1951 24	Rochdale	2–0	Gateshead	Rochdale
	Livesey (pen.); Middlebrough	Report		Stadium: Spotland Stadium; Attendance: 5612; Referee: PF Power

27 January 1951 25	Chester	1–3	Rochdale	Chester
	Astbury	Report	Livesey; Middlebrough	Stadium: Sealand Road; Attendance: 4534

3 February 1951 26	Crewe Alexandra	3–1	Rochdale	Crewe
	Phillips; Travis	Report	Livesey (pen.)	Stadium: Gresty Road; Attendance: 6941

10 February 1951 27	Rochdale	0–1	Oldham Athletic	Rochdale
		Report	McIlvenny	Stadium: Spotland Stadium; Attendance: 14238

17 February 1951 28	Rochdale	1–0	New Brighton	Rochdale
	Middlebrough	Report		Stadium: Spotland Stadium; Attendance: 3689

24 February 1951 29	York City	2–2	Rochdale	York
	Linaker; Brown	Report	Livesey; Steen	Stadium: Bootham Crescent; Attendance: 7664

3 March 1951 30	Rochdale	1–0	Barrow	Rochdale
	Middlebrough	Report		Stadium: Spotland Stadium; Attendance: 5509

10 March 1951 31	Accrington Stanley	1–2	Rochdale	Accrington
	Keeley	Report	Whitehouse; Connor	Stadium: Peel Park; Attendance: 4281

17 March 1951 32	Rochdale	4–1	Carlisle United	Rochdale
	Steen; Connor; McNichol	Report	Jackson	Stadium: Spotland Stadium; Attendance: 6190

24 March 1951 33	Tranmere Rovers	2–1	Rochdale	Birkenhead
	Rosenthal	Report	McNichol	Stadium: Prenton Park; Attendance: 8328

26 March 1951 34	Rochdale	4–0	Bradford City	Rochdale
	Connor; McNichol; Steen	Report		Stadium: Spotland Stadium; Attendance: 4233

27 March 1951 35	Bradford City	2–1	Rochdale	Bradford
	Williamson; Ward	Report	Connor	Stadium: Valley Parade; Attendance: 16164

31 March 1951 36	Rochdale	1–1	Southport	Rochdale
	Whitehouse	Report	Graham	Stadium: Spotland Stadium; Attendance: 3781

7 April 1951 37	Rotherham United	3–0	Rochdale	Rotherham
	Guest; Grainger; Williams	Report		Stadium: Millmoor; Attendance: 14202

10 April 1951 38	Rochdale	0–0	Halifax Town	Rochdale
		Report		Stadium: Spotland Stadium; Attendance: 3342

14 April 1951 39	Rochdale	0–0	Mansfield Town	Rochdale
		Report		Stadium: Spotland Stadium; Attendance: 4000

16 April 1951 40	Mansfield Town	1–0	Rochdale	Mansfield
	Reeve	Report		Stadium: Field Mill; Attendance: 11384

17 April 1951 41	Rochdale	3–0	Lincoln City	Rochdale
	Livesey; McGeachie; Foulds	Report		Stadium: Spotland Stadium; Attendance: 3533

21 April 1951 42	Scunthorpe & Lindsey United	3–0	Rochdale	Scunthorpe
	Cumner; Comley	Report		Stadium: Old Show Ground; Attendance: 9229

24 April 1951 43	Oldham Athletic	2–0	Rochdale	Oldham
	Hardwick; Gemmell	Report		Stadium: Boundary Park; Attendance: 13503

28 April 1951 44	Rochdale	2–0	Wrexham	Rochdale
	Barber; Middlebrough	Report		Stadium: Spotland Stadium; Attendance: 3288

2 May 1951 45	Wrexham	3–1	Rochdale	Wrexham
	Beynon; Tunnicliffe; Fidler	Report	Whitehouse	Stadium: Racecourse Ground; Attendance: 3633

5 May 1951 46	Rochdale	0–0	Darlington	Rochdale
		Report		Stadium: Spotland Stadium; Attendance: 3448

=== F.A. Cup ===
25 November 1950 1	Rochdale	3–1	Willington	Rochdale
	Whitehouse (pen.); Middlebrough	Report	Dodds	Stadium: Spotland Stadium; Attendance: 7657

9 December 1950 2	Ashington	1–2	Rochdale	Ashington
	Skeen	Report	Livesey; Steen	Stadium: Portland Park; Attendance: 13191; Referee: G Black

9 January 1951 3	Rochdale	2–3	Chelsea	Rochdale
	Connor 40'; Arthur 86'	Report	Billington 5'; Bentley 16', 61'	Stadium: Spotland Stadium; Attendance: 17817; Referee: JW Topliss

=== Lancashire Cup ===
11 October 1950	Accrington Stanley	2–1	Rochdale	Accrington
	Goal		Middlebrough	Stadium: Peel Park; Attendance: 2000
