= 1946–47 Rochdale A.F.C. season =

English football club season

Rochdale
1946–47 season
- Manager: Ted Goodier
- Stadium: Spotland Stadium
- Division 3 North: 6th
- F.A. Cup: 3rd Round
- Top goalscorer: League: Joe Hargreaves; All: Joe Hargreaves
Home colours

The 1946–47 season was Rochdale A.F.C.'s 40th in existence and their 19th in the Football League Third Division North. It was the first after World War 2 and the schedule was identical to the abandoned 1939–40 season.

== Squad Statistics ==
=== Appearances and goals ===
No.	Pos	Nat	Player	Total		Division 3 North		F.A. Cup	
No.	Pos	Nat	Player	Apps	Goals	Apps	Goals	Apps	Goals
	GK	(Wales) WAL	Bill Roberts	21	0	21	0	0	0
	DF	(England) ENG	Syd Pomphrey	9	0	9	0	0	0
	DF	(England) ENG	Bill Byrom	9	0	9	0	0	0
	MF	(England) ENG	Billy Hallard	20	2	17	2	3	0
	DF	(England) ENG	Wally Birch	38	2	35	1	3	1
	MF	(Wales) WAL	Joe McCormick	38	0	35	0	3	0
	MF	(England) ENG	Sammy Makin	5	1	5	1	0	0
	MF	(England) ENG	Eric Wood	31	4	31	4	0	0
	FW	(England) ENG	Joe Hargreaves	33	25	30	23	3	2
	MF	(Scotland) SCO	Joe Rodi	9	3	9	3	0	0
	MF	(England) ENG	Arthur Cunliffe	26	7	23	5	3	2
	DF	(Scotland) SCO	Tom Sneddon	2	0	2	0	0	0
	DF	(England) ENG	Charlie Hurst	4	1	4	1	0	0
	FW	(England) ENG	Tom West	4	2	4	2	0	0
	DF	(England) ENG	Tom Hargreaves	7	0	7	0	0	0
	FW	(England) ENG	Tommy Barkas	39	18	36	17	3	1
	MF	(England) ENG	Don Partridge	6	0	6	0	0	0
	GK	(Scotland) SCO	Bill Henderson	20	0	17	0	3	0
	DF	(England) ENG	Norman Kirkman	39	0	36	0	3	0
	FW	(England) ENG	Jimmy Cunliffe	2	0	2	0	0	0
	DF	(England) ENG	Len Jackson	30	0	27	0	3	0
	FW	(England) ENG	Billy Woods	18	6	15	1	3	5
	MF	(Scotland) SCO	Alec Carruthers	16	6	13	4	3	2
	FW	(England) ENG	Walter Jones	2	2	2	2	0	0
	MF	(England) ENG	Alan Moorhouse	10	2	10	2	0	0
	FW	(England) ENG	Jackie Moss	17	5	17	5	0	0
	MF	(Wales) WAL	Tom Sibley	10	2	10	2	0	0
	MF	(Scotland) SCO	Hugh O'Donnell	14	5	14	5	0	0
	GK	(England) ENG	Charlie Briggs	4	0	4	0	0	0
	MF	(England) ENG	Jackie Arthur	4	0	4	0	0	0
	MF	(Scotland) SCO	Frank Walkden	1	0	1	0	0	0
	MF	(England) ENG	Arthur Jones	1	0	1	0	0	0
	DF	(England) ENG	Ron Rothwell	1	0	1	0	0	0
	MF	(Scotland) SCO	John Oakes	1	0	1	0	0	0
	MF	(England) ENG	Cyril Lawrence	1	0	1	0	0	0
	DF	(England) ENG	Austin Collier	3	0	3	0	0	0

Squad Statistics (Non-competitive)

=== Appearances and goals (Non-competitive) ===
No.	Pos	Nat	Player	Total		Lancashire Cup	
No.	Pos	Nat	Player	Apps	Goals	Apps	Goals
	GK	(Wales) WAL	Bill Roberts	0	0	0	0
	DF	(England) ENG	Syd Pomphrey	2	0	2	0
	DF	(England) ENG	Bill Byrom	0	0	0	0
	MF	(England) ENG	Billy Hallard	2	0	2	0
	DF	(England) ENG	Wally Birch	2	0	2	0
	MF	(Wales) WAL	Joe McCormick	1	0	1	0
	MF	(England) ENG	Sammy Makin	1	0	1	0
	MF	(England) ENG	Eric Wood	1	0	1	0
	FW	(England) ENG	Joe Hargreaves	0	0	0	0
	MF	(Scotland) SCO	Joe Rodi	0	0	0	0
	MF	(England) ENG	Arthur Cunliffe	2	0	2	0
	DF	(Scotland) SCO	Tom Sneddon	0	0	0	0
	DF	(England) ENG	Charlie Hurst	0	0	0	0
	FW	(England) ENG	Tom West	2	0	2	0
	DF	(England) ENG	Tom Hargreaves	0	0	0	0
	FW	(England) ENG	Tommy Barkas	2	0	2	0
	MF	(England) ENG	Don Partridge	1	0	1	0
	GK	(Scotland) SCO	Bill Henderson	2	0	2	0
	DF	(England) ENG	Norman Kirkman	2	0	2	0
	FW	(England) ENG	Jimmy Cunliffe	0	0	0	0
	DF	(England) ENG	Len Jackson	0	0	0	0
	FW	(England) ENG	Billy Woods	1	0	1	0
	MF	(Scotland) SCO	Alec Carruthers	1	0	1	0
	FW	(England) ENG	Walter Jones	0	0	0	0
	MF	(England) ENG	Alan Moorhouse	0	0	0	0
	FW	(England) ENG	Jackie Moss	0	0	0	0
	MF	(Wales) WAL	Tom Sibley	0	0	0	0
	MF	(Scotland) SCO	Hugh O'Donnell	0	0	0	0
	GK	(England) ENG	Charlie Briggs	0	0	0	0
	MF	(England) ENG	Jackie Arthur	0	0	0	0
	MF	(Scotland) SCO	Frank Walkden	0	0	0	0
	MF	(England) ENG	Arthur Jones	0	0	0	0
	DF	(England) ENG	Ron Rothwell	0	0	0	0
	MF	(Scotland) SCO	John Oakes	0	0	0	0
	MF	(England) ENG	Cyril Lawrence	0	0	0	0
	DF	(England) ENG	Austin Collier	0	0	0	0

== Final league table ==
Pos	Team	Pld	W	D	L	GF	GA	GAv	Pts
4	Stockport County	42	24	2	16	78	53	1.472	50
5	Bradford City	42	20	10	12	62	47	1.319	50
6	Rochdale	42	19	10	13	80	64	1.250	48
7	Wrexham	42	17	12	13	65	51	1.275	46
8	Crewe Alexandra	42	17	9	16	70	74	0.946	43

Source: rsssf.com

== Competitions ==
=== Football League Third Division North ===
31 August 1946 1	Doncaster Rovers	2–1	Rochdale	Doncaster
	Maddison	Report	A. Cunliffe	Stadium: Belle Vue; Attendance: 8279

3 September 1946 2	Rochdale	0–1	Wrexham	Rochdale
		Report	Malam	Stadium: Spotland Stadium; Attendance: 5515

7 September 1946 3	Rochdale	0–1	York City	Rochdale
		Report	Allen	Stadium: Spotland Stadium; Attendance: 8315

9 September 1946 4	Oldham Athletic	3–2	Rochdale	Oldham
	Howe	Report	Wood; J. Hargreaves	Stadium: Boundary Park; Attendance: 11470

14 September 1946 5	Rochdale	2–2	New Brighton	Rochdale
	Makin; Hurst	Report	Kilshaw; McGeachie	Stadium: Spotland Stadium; Attendance: 5612

17 September 1946 6	Rochdale	1–3	Oldham Athletic	Rochdale
	Barkas	Report	Howe; Horton; Blackshaw	Stadium: Spotland Stadium; Attendance: 8097

21 September 1946 7	Halifax Town	3–0	Rochdale	Halifax
	Quinn; Mycock; Hazeldine	Report		Stadium: The Shay; Attendance: 4119

25 September 1946 8	Wrexham	2–2	Rochdale	Wrexham
	Hewitt; Baines	Report	J. Hargreaves; A. Cunliffe	Stadium: Racecourse Ground; Attendance: 7775

28 September 1946 9	Rochdale	6–0	Carlisle United	Rochdale
	J. Hargreaves; Rodi; A. Cunliffe; Barkas	Report		Stadium: Spotland Stadium; Attendance: 7414

5 October 1946 10	Accrington Stanley	2–3	Rochdale	Accrington
	Keeley (pen.); Hudson	Report	Rodi; Barkas	Stadium: Peel Park; Attendance: 4865

12 October 1946 11	Rochdale	1–1	Barrow	Rochdale
	A. Cunliffe	Report	Miller	Stadium: Spotland Stadium; Attendance: 7327

19 October 1946 12	Tranmere Rovers	2–3	Rochdale	Birkenhead
	Atkinson; Burns	Report	Carruthers; Barkas	Stadium: Prenton Park; Attendance: 7553

26 October 1946 13	Rochdale	3–0	Darlington	Rochdale
	J. Hargreaves; Barkas; Woods	Report		Stadium: Spotland Stadium; Attendance: 6493

2 November 1946 14	Hull City	0–1	Rochdale	Hull
		Report	Hallard	Stadium: Boothferry Park; Attendance: 22616

9 November 1946 15	Rochdale	2–3	Gateshead	Rochdale
	J. Hargreaves 8', 80'	Report	Small 15', 63'; McCormack 56'	Stadium: Spotland Stadium; Attendance: 8031

16 November 1946 16	Hartlepools United	0–3	Rochdale	Hartlepool
		Report	Wood; Barkas	Stadium: Victoria Park; Attendance: 7323

23 November 1946 17	Rochdale	1–1	Crewe Alexandra	Rochdale
	Birch	Report	Jones	Stadium: Spotland Stadium; Attendance: 6449

7 December 1946 18	Rochdale	0–0	Southport	Rochdale
		Report		Stadium: Spotland Stadium; Attendance: 4467

21 December 1946 19	Rochdale	2–1	Chester	Rochdale
	Hallard; Barkas	Report	Yates	Stadium: Spotland Stadium; Attendance: 7738

25 December 1946 20	Rochdale	1–4	Stockport County	Rochdale
	J. Hargreaves	Report	Brown; Walker	Stadium: Spotland Stadium; Attendance: 7153

26 December 1946 21	Stockport County	5–2	Rochdale	Stockport
	Earl; Cocker; Brinton; Walker	Report	W. Jones	Stadium: Edgeley Park; Attendance: 14408

28 December 1946 22	Rochdale	2–3	Doncaster Rovers	Rochdale
	J. Hargreaves; Wood	Report	Kirkaldie; Maddison; Todd	Stadium: Spotland Stadium; Attendance: 13555

4 January 1947 23	York City	2–3	Rochdale	York
	Gledhill; Allen	Report	J. Hargreaves; Carruthers	Stadium: Bootham Crescent; Attendance: 5363

18 January 1947 24	New Brighton	1–2	Rochdale	New Brighton
	Wells	Report	J. Hargreaves	Stadium: Tower Athletic Ground; Attendance: 5380

22 January 1947 25	Lincoln City	2–3	Rochdale	Lincoln
	Hutchinson; Cheetham	Report	A. Cunliffe; Barkas; J. Hargreaves	Stadium: Sincil Bank; Attendance: 3249

25 January 1947 26	Rochdale	1–0	Halifax Town	Rochdale
	Carruthers	Report		Stadium: Spotland Stadium; Attendance: 7504

1 February 1947 27	Carlisle United	1–3	Rochdale	Carlisle
	Iceton (pen.)	Report	West; Moorhouse	Stadium: Brunton Park; Attendance: 9140

1 March 1947 28	Darlington	4–1	Rochdale	Darlington
	Bower; Varty	Report	Moorhouse	Stadium: Feethams; Attendance: 4931

8 March 1947 29	Rochdale	5–2	Hull City	Rochdale
	J. Hargreaves; Barkas; Moss	Report	Peach; Mills	Stadium: Spotland Stadium; Attendance: 6565

22 March 1947 30	Rochdale	1–0	Hartlepools United	Rochdale
	Barkas	Report		Stadium: Spotland Stadium; Attendance: 7504

29 March 1947 31	Crewe Alexandra	2–2	Rochdale	Crewe
	Meaney; Jones	Report	Sibley; O'Donnell	Stadium: Gresty Road; Attendance: 3247

4 April 1947 32	Rochdale	0–1	Bradford City	Rochdale
		Report	Shearer	Stadium: Spotland Stadium; Attendance: 10539

5 April 1947 33	Rochdale	2–0	Lincoln City	Rochdale
	Sibley; O'Donnell	Report		Stadium: Spotland Stadium; Attendance: 6634

7 April 1947 34	Bradford City	0–1	Rochdale	Bradford
		Report	Barkas	Stadium: Valley Parade; Attendance: 10267

12 April 1947 35	Southport	0–2	Rochdale	Southport
		Report	Moss	Stadium: Haig Avenue; Attendance: 4949

19 April 1947 36	Rochdale	1–1	Rotherham United	Rochdale
	O'Donnell	Report	McLean	Stadium: Spotland Stadium; Attendance: 11908

26 April 1947 37	Chester	1–0	Rochdale	Chester
	Yates	Report		Stadium: Sealand Road; Attendance: 4278

10 May 1947 38	Barrow	2–2	Rochdale	Barrow-in-Furness
	Mullen; Forbes (pen.)	Report	J. Hargreaves	Stadium: Holker Street; Attendance: 5322

17 May 1947 39	Gateshead	2–2	Rochdale	Gateshead
	Forster; Johnson	Report	J. Hargreaves	Stadium: Redheugh Park; Attendance: 4314

24 May 1947 40	Rochdale	5–1	Accrington Stanley	Rochdale
	Moss; J. Hargreaves; Barkas	Report	Mercer	Stadium: Spotland Stadium; Attendance: 6758

31 May 1947 41	Rochdale	3–0	Tranmere Rovers	Rochdale
	J. Hargreaves; Barkas	Report		Stadium: Spotland Stadium; Attendance: 5529

7 June 1947 42	Rotherham United	3–3	Rochdale	Rotherham
	Wilson; Hainsworth; Guest	Report	O'Donnell; Barkas	Stadium: Millmoor; Attendance: 10375

=== F.A. Cup ===
30 November 1946 1	Rochdale	6–1	Bishop Auckland	Rochdale
	J. Hargreaves; A. Cunliffe; Birch; Barkas; Woods	Report	Teasdale	Stadium: Spotland Stadium; Attendance: 8319

14 December 1946 2	Rochdale	6–1	Hartlepools United	Rochdale
	Woods; A. Cunliffe; Carruthers	Report	McMahon	Stadium: Spotland Stadium; Attendance: 6500

11 January 1947 3	Charlton Athletic	3–1	Rochdale	London
	Duffy; Lancelotte	Report	Woods	Stadium: The Valley; Attendance: 23271

=== Lancashire Cup ===
15 October 1946	Chester	2–0	Rochdale	Chester
	Goal			Stadium: Sealand Road; Attendance: 3000

22 October 1946	Rochdale	0–1	Chester	Rochdale
			Goal	Stadium: Spotland Stadium; Attendance: 2456
