= 1948–49 Rochdale A.F.C. season =

English football club season

Rochdale
1948–49 season
- Manager: Ted Goodier
- Stadium: Spotland Stadium
- Third Division North: 7th
- FA Cup: Second round
- Top goalscorer: League: Jack Connor; All: Jack Connor
Home colours

The 1948–49 season was Rochdale A.F.C.'s 42nd in existence and their 21st in the Football League Third Division North.

== Squad Statistics ==
=== Appearances and goals ===
No.	Pos	Nat	Player	Total		Division 3 North		F.A. Cup	
No.	Pos	Nat	Player	Apps	Goals	Apps	Goals	Apps	Goals
	GK	(Wales) WAL	Bill Roberts	5	0	5	0	0	0
	DF	(England) ENG	Bill Watson	41	0	40	0	1	0
	DF	(England) ENG	Arnold Bonell	5	0	5	0	0	0
	MF	(England) ENG	Cecil Heydon	1	0	1	0	0	0
	DF	(England) ENG	Walter Price	1	0	1	0	0	0
	MF	(England) ENG	Don Partridge	35	0	33	0	2	0
	MF	(England) ENG	Cyril Lawrence	13	1	12	1	1	0
	FW	(England) ENG	George Eastham	3	0	2	0	1	0
	FW	(England) ENG	Jack Livesey	33	8	32	8	1	0
	FW	(England) ENG	Cyril Brown	9	3	9	3	0	0
	MF	(Scotland) SCO	Tom Dryburgh	40	6	39	6	1	0
	DF	(England) ENG	Wally Birch	43	6	41	6	2	0
	MF	(Scotland) SCO	David Reid	14	1	14	1	0	0
	MF	(England) ENG	Jackie Arthur	29	3	28	3	1	0
	FW	(England) ENG	Jackie Moss	23	8	21	8	2	0
	MF	(England) ENG	Eric Wood	36	6	34	6	2	0
	GK	(England) ENG	Les Bywater	24	0	22	0	2	0
	DF	(England) ENG	Ron Rothwell	22	0	20	0	2	0
	FW	(England) ENG	Alan Middlebrough	6	3	4	2	2	1
	MF	(England) ENG	Jimmy Britton	3	0	2	0	1	0
	FW	(Scotland) SCO	Ronnie Hood	9	1	9	1	0	0
	MF	(Scotland) SCO	Alex Hawson	1	0	1	0	0	0
	MF	(Scotland) SCO	George McGeachie	21	0	21	0	0	0
	FW	(England) ENG	Jack Connor	22	10	22	10	0	0
	GK	(England) ENG	Trevor Churchill	15	0	15	0	0	0
	FW	(England) ENG	Billy Woods	10	0	10	0	0	0
	DF	(England) ENG	Harry Hubbick	19	0	19	0	0	0
			Tom Jones	0	0	0	0	0	0
		(England) ENG	Jimmy Cheetham	0	0	0	0	0	0

Squad Statistics (Non-competitive)

=== Appearances and goals (Non-competitive) ===
No.	Pos	Nat	Player	Total		Lancashire Cup	
No.	Pos	Nat	Player	Apps	Goals	Apps	Goals
	GK	(Wales) WAL	Bill Roberts	1	0	1	0
	DF	(England) ENG	Bill Watson	3	0	3	0
	DF	(England) ENG	Arnold Bonell	1	0	1	0
	MF	(England) ENG	Cecil Heydon	0	0	0	0
	DF	(England) ENG	Walter Price	0	0	0	0
	MF	(England) ENG	Don Partridge	3	0	3	0
	MF	(England) ENG	Cyril Lawrence	2	0	2	0
	FW	(England) ENG	George Eastham	2	0	2	0
	FW	(England) ENG	Jack Livesey	2	1	2	1
	FW	(England) ENG	Cyril Brown	0	0	0	0
	MF	(Scotland) SCO	Tom Dryburgh	5	2	5	2
	DF	(England) ENG	Wally Birch	5	1	5	1
	MF	(Scotland) SCO	David Reid	1	0	1	0
	MF	(England) ENG	Jackie Arthur	3	0	3	0
	FW	(England) ENG	Jackie Moss	2	0	2	0
	MF	(England) ENG	Eric Wood	5	0	5	0
	GK	(England) ENG	Les Bywater	3	0	3	0
	DF	(England) ENG	Ron Rothwell	3	0	3	0
	FW	(England) ENG	Alan Middlebrough	2	1	2	1
	MF	(England) ENG	Jimmy Britton	1	0	1	0
	FW	(Scotland) SCO	Ronnie Hood	0	0	0	0
	MF	(Scotland) SCO	Alex Hawson	0	0	0	0
	MF	(Scotland) SCO	George McGeachie	2	0	2	0
	FW	(England) ENG	Jack Connor	2	2	2	2
	GK	(England) ENG	Trevor Churchill	1	0	1	0
	FW	(England) ENG	Billy Woods	2	0	2	0
	DF	(England) ENG	Harry Hubbick	2	0	2	0
			Tom Jones	1	0	1	0
		(England) ENG	Jimmy Cheetham	1	0	1	0

== Final league table ==
Pos	Team	Pld	W	D	L	GF	GA	GAv	Pts
5	Gateshead	42	16	13	13	69	58	1.190	45
6	Oldham Athletic	42	18	9	15	75	67	1.119	45
7	Rochdale	42	18	9	15	55	53	1.038	45
8	Stockport County	42	16	11	15	61	56	1.089	43
9	Wrexham	42	17	9	16	56	62	0.903	43

Source: rsssf.com

== Competitions ==
=== Football League Third Division North ===
21 August 1948 1	Hartlepools United	6–1	Rochdale	Hartlepool
	Price; Richardson; Hawkins; Watson (o.g.)	Report	Brown	Stadium: Victoria Park; Attendance: 10383

24 August 1948 2	Rochdale	3–0	Gateshead	Rochdale
	Wood; Livesey; Arthur	Report		Stadium: Spotland Stadium; Attendance: 9955

28 August 1948 3	Rochdale	3–4	Darlington	Rochdale
	Brown; Wood	Report	Clarke; Quinn; Milner	Stadium: Spotland Stadium; Attendance: 12326

30 August 1948 4	Gateshead	2–1	Rochdale	Gateshead
	Weddle; Small	Report	Livesey	Stadium: Redheugh Park; Attendance: 7410

4 September 1948 5	Oldham Athletic	0–1	Rochdale	Oldham
		Report	Wood	Stadium: Boundary Park; Attendance: 18065

7 September 1948 6	Rochdale	1–0	Carlisle United	Rochdale
	Moss	Report		Stadium: Spotland Stadium; Attendance: 8343

11 September 1948 7	New Brighton	1–2	Rochdale	New Brighton
	Lyon	Report	Livesey; Moss	Stadium: Tower Athletic Ground; Attendance: 8385

16 September 1948 8	Carlisle United	1–1	Rochdale	Carlisle
	Walshaw	Report	Birch (pen.)	Stadium: Brunton Park; Attendance: 12539

18 September 1948 9	Rochdale	3–1	Chester	Rochdale
	Arthur; Dryburgh; Moss	Report	Best	Stadium: Spotland Stadium; Attendance: 11965

25 September 1948 10	Southport	3–1	Rochdale	Southport
	Wyles; Banks	Report	Livesey	Stadium: Haig Avenue; Attendance: 9643

2 October 1948 11	Rochdale	3–0	Crewe Alexandra	Rochdale
	Wood; Dryburgh; Reid	Report		Stadium: Spotland Stadium; Attendance: 10836

9 October 1948 12	Rochdale	4–1	Accrington Stanley	Rochdale
	Wood; Dryburgh; Moss	Report	Parker	Stadium: Spotland Stadium; Attendance: 11151

16 October 1948 13	Rotherham United	3–1	Rochdale	Rotherham
	Guest; Grainger; Shaw	Report	Birch (pen.)	Stadium: Millmoor; Attendance: 16750

23 October 1948 14	Rochdale	1–1	Hull City	Rochdale
	Birch (pen.)	Report	Harrison	Stadium: Spotland Stadium; Attendance: 14967

30 October 1948 15	Doncaster Rovers	1–0	Rochdale	Doncaster
	Tindill	Report		Stadium: Belle Vue; Attendance: 18860

6 November 1948 16	Rochdale	1–1	Bradford City	Rochdale
	Moss	Report	Asquith (pen.)	Stadium: Spotland Stadium; Attendance: 8707

13 November 1948 17	Halifax Town	2–1	Rochdale	Halifax
	Hodgkinson; Mycock	Report	Wood	Stadium: The Shay; Attendance: 7743

20 November 1948 18	Rochdale	2–1	Wrexham	Rochdale
	Moss; Middlebrough	Report	Boothway	Stadium: Spotland Stadium; Attendance: 7760

18 December 1948 19	Rochdale	0–1	Hartlepools United	Rochdale
		Report	Sloan	Stadium: Spotland Stadium; Attendance: 5803

25 December 1948 20	Stockport County	2–2	Rochdale	Stockport
	Barkas; Herd	Report	Moss; Dryburgh	Stadium: Edgeley Park; Attendance: 10641

27 December 1948 21	Rochdale	2–0	Stockport County	Rochdale
	Dryburgh; Birch (pen.)	Report		Stadium: Spotland Stadium; Attendance: 10510

1 January 1949 22	Darlington	6–1	Rochdale	Darlington
	Ward; Quinn; Bower	Report	Middlebrough	Stadium: Feethams; Attendance: 9887

15 January 1949 23	Rochdale	1–2	Oldham Athletic	Rochdale
	Birch (pen.)	Report	Haddington; Gemmell	Stadium: Spotland Stadium; Attendance: 8252

22 January 1949 24	Rochdale	1–1	New Brighton	Rochdale
	Connor	Report	Taylor	Stadium: Spotland Stadium; Attendance: 5867

29 January 1949 25	Barrow	0–1	Rochdale	Barrow-in-Furness
		Report	Livesey	Stadium: Holker Street; Attendance: 7321

5 February 1949 26	Chester	2–1	Rochdale	Chester
	Foulds	Report	Livesey	Stadium: Sealand Road; Attendance: 5570

12 February 1949 27	Tranmere Rovers	0–0	Rochdale	Birkenhead
		Report		Stadium: Prenton Park; Attendance: 7246

19 February 1949 28	Rochdale	1–0	Southport	Rochdale
	Connor	Report		Stadium: Spotland Stadium; Attendance: 4322

26 February 1949 29	Crewe Alexandra	1–2	Rochdale	Crewe
	Ferris (pen.)	Report	Connor	Stadium: Gresty Road; Attendance: 6062

12 March 1949 30	Rochdale	2–0	Rotherham United	Rochdale
	Arthur; Connor	Report		Stadium: Spotland Stadium; Attendance: 9840

19 March 1949 31	Hull City	1–1	Rochdale	Hull
	Price	Report	Hood	Stadium: Boothferry Park; Attendance: 36509

26 March 1949 32	Rochdale	0–2	Doncaster Rovers	Rochdale
		Report	Tindill; Barritt	Stadium: Spotland Stadium; Attendance: 8637

2 April 1949 33	Bradford City	1–0	Rochdale	Bradford
	Molyneux	Report		Stadium: Valley Parade; Attendance: 10314

4 April 1949 34	Rochdale	1–0	Mansfield Town	Rochdale
	Connor	Report		Stadium: Spotland Stadium; Attendance: 3362

9 April 1949 35	Rochdale	1–0	Halifax Town	Rochdale
	Connor	Report		Stadium: Spotland Stadium; Attendance: 6885

15 April 1949 36	York City	1–1	Rochdale	York
	Storey	Report	Livesey	Stadium: Bootham Crescent; Attendance: 12438

16 April 1949 37	Wrexham	2–0	Rochdale	Wrexham
	Rowell 25'; Beynon 37'	Report		Stadium: Racecourse Ground; Attendance: 8494

18 April 1949 38	Rochdale	2–0	York City	Rochdale
	Connor; Birch (pen.)	Report		Stadium: Spotland Stadium; Attendance: 7758

23 April 1949 39	Rochdale	3–0	Barrow	Rochdale
	Livesey; Lawrence; Connor	Report		Stadium: Spotland Stadium; Attendance: 7757

27 April 1949 40	Accrington Stanley	0–0	Rochdale	Accrington
		Report		Stadium: Peel Park; Attendance: 5446

30 April 1949 41	Mansfield Town	2–0	Rochdale	Mansfield
	Chessell	Report		Stadium: Field Mill; Attendance: 9885

7 May 1949 42	Rochdale	2–1	Tranmere Rovers	Rochdale
	Dryburgh; Connor	Report	Williamson	Stadium: Spotland Stadium; Attendance: 5923

=== F.A. Cup ===
27 November 1948 1	Rochdale	1–1 (a.e.t.)	Barrow	Oldham
	Middlebrough	Report	McIntosh	Stadium: Boundary Park; Attendance: 12077

4 December 1948 1	Barrow	2–0	Rochdale	Barrow-in-Furness
	Collins; Livingstone	Report		Stadium: Holker Street; Attendance: 9570

=== Lancashire Cup ===
26 October 1948 1	Bury	1–2	Rochdale	Bury
	Goal		Dryburgh	Stadium: Gigg Lane; Attendance: 3300

9 November 1948 2	Rochdale	1–1	Everton	Rochdale
	Birch (pen.)		Goal	Stadium: Spotland Stadium; Attendance: 2372

16 November 1948 2	Everton	0–1	Rochdale	Liverpool
			Middlebrough	Stadium: Goodison Park; Attendance: 5103

3 May 1949 SF	Manchester City	0–2	Rochdale	Manchester
			Livesey; Connor	Stadium: Maine Road; Attendance: 3812

10 May 1949 F	Blackpool	0–1	Rochdale	Oldham
			Connor	Stadium: Boundary Park; Attendance: 13174
