= 1949–50 Rochdale A.F.C. season =

English football club season

Rochdale
1949–50 season
- Manager: Ted Goodier
- Stadium: Spotland Stadium
- Third Division North: 3rd
- FA Cup: Second round
- Top goalscorer: League: Jack Connor; Jack Livesey; All: Jack Connor

The 1949–50 season was Rochdale A.F.C.'s 43rd in existence and their 22nd in the Football League Third Division North.

== Squad Statistics ==
=== Appearances and goals ===
| No. | Pos | Nat | Player | Total | | Division 3 North | | F.A. Cup | |
| No. | Pos | Nat | Player | Apps | Goals | Apps | Goals | Apps | Goals |
|---|---|---|---|---|---|---|---|---|---|
| | GK | (England) ENG | Trevor Churchill | 38 | 0 | 37 | 0 | 1 | 0 |
| | DF | (England) ENG | Bill Watson | 41 | 0 | 39 | 0 | 2 | 0 |
| | DF | (England) ENG | Harry Hubbick | 44 | 0 | 42 | 0 | 2 | 0 |
| | MF | (Scotland) SCO | George McGeachie | 33 | 2 | 31 | 2 | 2 | 0 |
| | DF | (England) ENG | Wally Birch | 39 | 1 | 37 | 1 | 2 | 0 |
| | MF | (England) ENG | Eric Wood | 43 | 0 | 41 | 0 | 2 | 0 |
| | MF | (England) ENG | Cyril Lawrence | 7 | 2 | 7 | 2 | 0 | 0 |
| | FW | (England) ENG | Jack Livesey | 42 | 16 | 40 | 16 | 2 | 0 |
| | FW | (England) ENG | Jack Connor | 36 | 18 | 34 | 16 | 2 | 2 |
| | FW | (England) ENG | Bert Williams | 8 | 3 | 8 | 3 | 0 | 0 |
| | MF | (Scotland) SCO | Tom Dryburgh | 40 | 12 | 38 | 11 | 2 | 1 |
| | FW | (England) ENG | Billy Woods | 3 | 1 | 3 | 1 | 0 | 0 |
| | FW | (Scotland) SCO | Benny Nicol | 5 | 1 | 5 | 1 | 0 | 0 |
| | MF | (Poland) POL | Konrad Kapler | 4 | 0 | 4 | 0 | 0 | 0 |
| | MF | (England) ENG | Jackie Arthur | 35 | 5 | 33 | 5 | 2 | 0 |
| | FW | (England) ENG | Alan Middlebrough | 8 | 4 | 8 | 4 | 0 | 0 |
| | DF | (England) ENG | Ron Rothwell | 3 | 0 | 3 | 0 | 0 | 0 |
| | FW | (England) ENG | Cyril Brown | 32 | 6 | 30 | 5 | 2 | 1 |
| | GK | (Scotland) SCO | Wally Stanners | 6 | 0 | 5 | 0 | 1 | 0 |
| | MF | (England) ENG | Don Partridge | 8 | 0 | 8 | 0 | 0 | 0 |
| | MF | (Scotland) SCO | David Reid | 9 | 0 | 9 | 0 | 0 | 0 |

Squad Statistics (Non-competitive)

=== Appearances and goals (Non-competitive) ===
| No. | Pos | Nat | Player | Total | | Lancashire Cup | |
| No. | Pos | Nat | Player | Apps | Goals | Apps | Goals |
|---|---|---|---|---|---|---|---|
| | GK | (England) ENG | Trevor Churchill | 3 | 0 | 3 | 0 |
| | DF | (England) ENG | Bill Watson | 4 | 0 | 4 | 0 |
| | DF | (England) ENG | Harry Hubbick | 4 | 0 | 4 | 0 |
| | MF | (Scotland) SCO | George McGeachie | 3 | 0 | 3 | 0 |
| | DF | (England) ENG | Wally Birch | 3 | 0 | 3 | 0 |
| | MF | (England) ENG | Eric Wood | 4 | 0 | 4 | 0 |
| | MF | (England) ENG | Cyril Lawrence | 1 | 0 | 1 | 0 |
| | FW | (England) ENG | Jack Livesey | 2 | 0 | 2 | 0 |
| | FW | (England) ENG | Jack Connor | 4 | 1 | 4 | 1 |
| | FW | (England) ENG | Bert Williams | 1 | 0 | 1 | 0 |
| | MF | (Scotland) SCO | Tom Dryburgh | 4 | 2 | 4 | 2 |
| | FW | (England) ENG | Billy Woods | 0 | 0 | 0 | 0 |
| | FW | (Scotland) SCO | Benny Nicol | 2 | 0 | 2 | 0 |
| | MF | (Poland) POL | Konrad Kapler | 0 | 0 | 0 | 0 |
| | MF | (England) ENG | Jackie Arthur | 2 | 0 | 2 | 0 |
| | FW | (England) ENG | Alan Middlebrough | 0 | 0 | 0 | 0 |
| | DF | (England) ENG | Ron Rothwell | 0 | 0 | 0 | 0 |
| | FW | (England) ENG | Cyril Brown | 4 | 0 | 4 | 0 |
| | GK | (Scotland) SCO | Wally Stanners | 1 | 0 | 1 | 0 |
| | MF | (England) ENG | Don Partridge | 1 | 0 | 1 | 0 |
| | MF | (Scotland) SCO | David Reid | 1 | 0 | 1 | 0 |

== Final league table ==
| Pos | Team | Pld | W | D | L | GF | GA | GAv | Pts | Promotion |
|---|---|---|---|---|---|---|---|---|---|---|
| 1 | Doncaster Rovers (C, P) | 42 | 19 | 17 | 6 | 66 | 38 | 1.737 | 55 | Promotion to the Second Division |
| 2 | Gateshead | 42 | 23 | 7 | 12 | 87 | 54 | 1.611 | 53 | |
| 3 | Rochdale | 42 | 21 | 9 | 12 | 68 | 41 | 1.659 | 51 | |
| 4 | Lincoln City | 42 | 21 | 9 | 12 | 60 | 39 | 1.538 | 51 | |
| 5 | Tranmere Rovers | 42 | 19 | 11 | 12 | 51 | 48 | 1.063 | 49 | |

Source: rsssf.com
(C) Champions; (P) Promoted

== Competitions ==
=== Football League Third Division North ===
| 20 August 1949 1 | Rochdale | 1–3 | Gateshead | Rochdale |
| | Connor | Report | Wilbert; Ingham | Stadium: Spotland Stadium; Attendance: 6837; Referee: F. Walton |

| 25 August 1949 2 | Doncaster Rovers | 0–0 | Rochdale | Doncaster |
| | | Report | | Stadium: Belle Vue; Attendance: 21567; Referee: G. Tedds |

| 27 August 1949 3 | Hartlepools United | 1–2 | Rochdale | Hartlepool |
| | Owens | Report | Lawrence | Stadium: Victoria Park; Attendance: 10519; Referee: L. Richardson |

| 30 August 1949 4 | Rochdale | 0–1 | Doncaster Rovers | Rochdale |
| | | Report | Doherty | Stadium: Spotland Stadium; Attendance: 11271; Referee: G. Tedds |

| 3 September 1949 5 | Rochdale | 2–0 | Darlington | Rochdale |
| | Woods; Connor | Report | | Stadium: Spotland Stadium; Attendance: 8120; Referee: J.S. Pickles |

| 5 September 1949 6 | Rochdale | 0–1 | Chester | Rochdale |
| | | Report | Tilston | Stadium: Spotland Stadium; Attendance: 7543; Referee: T. Seymour |

| 10 September 1949 7 | New Brighton | 0–4 | Rochdale | New Brighton |
| | | Report | Williams; Livesey; Middlebrough; Dryburgh | Stadium: Tower Athletic Ground; Attendance: 5986; Referee: G. Gibson |

| 14 September 1949 8 | Chester | 0–2 | Rochdale | Chester |
| | | Report | Dryburgh; Middlebrough | Stadium: Sealand Road; Attendance: 5165; Referee: W.H.E. Evans |

| 17 September 1949 9 | Rochdale | 1–0 | Halifax Town | Rochdale |
| | Dryburgh | Report | | Stadium: Spotland Stadium; Attendance: 8755; Referee: B.J. Flanagan |

| 24 September 1949 10 | Oldham Athletic | 0–0 | Rochdale | Oldham |
| | | Report | | Stadium: Boundary Park; Attendance: 23716; Referee: A.C. Denham |

| 1 October 1949 11 | Bradford City | 2–1 | Rochdale | Bradford |
| | Doonan; Ward | Report | Arthur | Stadium: Valley Parade; Attendance: 12707; Referee: H. Trenholm |

| 8 October 1949 12 | Rochdale | 3–1 | York City | Rochdale |
| | Connor; Livesey | Report | Patrick | Stadium: Spotland Stadium; Attendance: 8049; Referee: L. Richardson |

| 15 October 1949 13 | Tranmere Rovers | 1–0 | Rochdale | Birkenhead |
| | Bainbridge | Report | | Stadium: Prenton Park; Attendance: 10820; Referee: E. Plinston |

| 22 October 1949 14 | Rochdale | 2–1 | Crewe Alexandra | Rochdale |
| | Connor | Report | Mullard | Stadium: Spotland Stadium; Attendance: 9790; Referee: J. Houston |

| 29 October 1949 15 | Barrow | 0–1 | Rochdale | Barrow-in-Furness |
| | | Report | Arthur | Stadium: Holker Street; Attendance: 5105; Referee: T. Seymour |

| 5 November 1949 16 | Rochdale | 2–0 | Lincoln City | Rochdale |
| | Connor 10'; Dryburgh 39' | Report | | Stadium: Spotland Stadium; Attendance: 8867; Referee: R.J. Leafe |

| 12 November 1949 17 | Rotherham United | 4–3 | Rochdale | Rotherham |
| | Guest; Rudd; Bower; Shaw | Report | Connor; Dryburgh | Stadium: Millmoor; Attendance: 9113; Referee: A.E. Ellis |

| 19 November 1949 18 | Rochdale | 1–0 | Carlisle United | Rochdale |
| | Brown | Report | | Stadium: Spotland Stadium; Attendance: 7323; Referee: A.W. Luty |

| 3 December 1949 19 | Rochdale | 2–0 | Accrington Stanley | Rochdale |
| | Dryburgh; McGeachie | Report | | Stadium: Spotland Stadium; Attendance: 5349 |

| 17 December 1949 20 | Gateshead | 1–3 | Rochdale | Gateshead |
| | Kendall | Report | Livesey | Stadium: Redheugh Park; Attendance: 3997; Referee: F.B. Coultas |

| 24 December 1949 21 | Rochdale | 4–0 | Hartlepools United | Rochdale |
| | Dryburgh; Connor; Livesey | Report | | Stadium: Spotland Stadium; Attendance: 7439; Referee: L. Richardson |

| 26 December 1949 22 | Rochdale | 2–0 | Southport | Rochdale |
| | Livesey; Connor | Report | | Stadium: Spotland Stadium; Attendance: 13406; Referee: G. Black |

| 27 December 1949 23 | Southport | 3–2 | Rochdale | Southport |
| | Wyles; Powell; Meadows | Report | Brown; Dryburgh | Stadium: Haig Avenue; Attendance: 14766; Referee: G. Black |

| 31 December 1949 24 | Darlington | 1–1 | Rochdale | Darlington |
| | Ward | Report | Livesey | Stadium: Feethams; Attendance: 8196 |

| 14 January 1950 25 | Rochdale | 4–0 | New Brighton | Rochdale |
| | Birch (pen.); Livesey; McGeachie; Brown | Report | | Stadium: Spotland Stadium; Attendance: 9300; Referee: G. Gibson |

| 21 January 1950 26 | Halifax Town | 3–2 | Rochdale | Halifax |
| | Bennett; Watson (o.g.); Core | Report | Connor | Stadium: The Shay; Attendance: 10398; Referee: B.J. Flanagan |

| 28 January 1950 27 | Mansfield Town | 1–1 | Rochdale | Mansfield |
| | Godwin | Report | Nicol | Stadium: Field Mill; Attendance: 11492; Referee: H. Jackson |

| 4 February 1950 28 | Rochdale | 1–0 | Oldham Athletic | Rochdale |
| | Connor | Report | | Stadium: Spotland Stadium; Attendance: 14516; Referee: A.C. Denham |

| 11 February 1950 29 | Wrexham | 3–0 | Rochdale | Wrexham |
| | Wynn | Report | | Stadium: Racecourse Ground; Attendance: 5638; Referee: J. Platt |

| 18 February 1950 30 | Rochdale | 2–2 | Bradford City | Rochdale |
| | Williams | Report | McGill (pen.) | Stadium: Spotland Stadium; Attendance: 8980; Referee: H. Trenholm |

| 25 February 1950 31 | Carlisle United | 2–0 | Rochdale | Carlisle |
| | Billingham | Report | | Stadium: Brunton Park; Attendance: 9525; Referee: A.W. Luty |

| 4 March 1950 32 | Rochdale | 7–1 | Mansfield Town | Rochdale |
| | Livesey; Middlebrough; Dryburgh; Arthur | Report | Antonio | Stadium: Spotland Stadium; Attendance: 6336; Referee: H. Jackson |

| 11 March 1950 33 | Crewe Alexandra | 0–1 | Rochdale | Crewe |
| | | Report | Brown | Stadium: Gresty Road; Attendance: 11781; Referee: J. Houston |

| 18 March 1950 34 | Rochdale | 2–1 | Barrow | Rochdale |
| | Livesey; Arthur | Report | King | Stadium: Spotland Stadium; Attendance: 8391; Referee: T. Seymour |

| 25 March 1950 35 | Lincoln City | 2–0 | Rochdale | Lincoln |
| | Dodds; Whittle | Report | | Stadium: Sincil Bank; Attendance: 11009; Referee: R.J. Leafe |

| 1 April 1950 36 | Rochdale | 1–0 | Rotherham United | Rochdale |
| | Connor | Report | | Stadium: Spotland Stadium; Attendance: 7653; Referee: A.E. Ellis |

| 7 April 1950 37 | Stockport County | 1–1 | Rochdale | Stockport |
| | Herd | Report | Glover (o.g.) | Stadium: Edgeley Park; Attendance: 14751 |

| 8 April 1950 38 | York City | 2–2 | Rochdale | York |
| | M. Patrick; A. Patrick | Report | Livesey | Stadium: Bootham Crescent; Attendance: 6102; Referee: L. Richardson |

| 10 April 1950 39 | Rochdale | 1–1 | Stockport County | Rochdale |
| | Arthur | Report | Robinson | Stadium: Spotland Stadium; Attendance: 6711; Referee: F.H. Gerrard |

| 15 April 1950 40 | Rochdale | 3–0 | Tranmere Rovers | Rochdale |
| | Connor; Brown; Dryburgh | Report | | Stadium: Spotland Stadium; Attendance: 7773; Referee: E. Plinston |

| 22 April 1950 41 | Accrington Stanley | 1–0 | Rochdale | Accrington |
| | Travis | Report | | Stadium: Peel Park; Attendance: 7302; Referee: H. Jackson |

| 29 April 1950 42 | Rochdale | 1–1 | Wrexham | Rochdale |
| | Connor | Report | Wynn | Stadium: Spotland Stadium; Attendance: 3397 |

=== F.A. Cup ===
| 26 November 1949 1 | Rhyl | 0–3 | Rochdale | Rhyl |
| | | Report | Connor; Dryburgh | Stadium: Belle Vue; Attendance: 7852 |

| 10 December 1949 2 | Rochdale | 1–2 | Notts County | Rochdale |
| | Brown | Report | Johnston; Lawton | Stadium: Spotland Stadium; Attendance: 24231; Referee: T. Seymour |

=== Lancashire Cup ===
| 25 October 1949 | Rochdale | 0–0 | Blackpool | Rochdale |
| | | | | Stadium: Spotland Stadium; Attendance: 1413 |

| 9 November 1949 | Blackpool | 0–1 | Rochdale | Blackpool |
| | | | Dryburgh | Stadium: Bloomfield Road; Attendance: 2500 |

| 8 February 1950 | Bolton Wanderers | 0–1 | Rochdale | Bolton |
| | | | Dryburgh | Stadium: Burnden Park; Attendance: 3339 |

| 18 April 1950 SF | Rochdale | 1–2 | Burnley | Rochdale |
| | Connor | | Goal | Stadium: Spotland Stadium; Attendance: 7878 |
