= Paddy McIlvenny =

Paddy McIlvenny may refer to:

- Paddy McIlvenny (footballer, born 1900) (1900–?), Irish footballer
- Paddy McIlvenny (footballer, born 1924) (1924–2013), Northern Irish footballer
