= Walshaw (surname) =

Walshaw is a surname that may refer to:

- Glen Walshaw (born 1976), Zimbabwean athlete in swimming
- Ken Walshaw (1918–1979), English athlete in football
- Lucas Walshaw (born 1992), English athlete in rugby
- Tom Walshaw (1912–1998), English engineer, author, model engineering expert

== See also ==
- Walshaw, a village in Greater Manchester, England
- Walshaw Dean Reservoirs, West Yorkshire, England
