= Ray Davies (disambiguation) =

Ray Davies (born 1944) is an English rock musician, best known for his work with the Kinks.

Ray or Raymond Davies may also refer to:

- Ray Davies (trumpeter) (1927–2017), English trumpeter and bandleader
- Ray Davies (footballer, born 1931), English footballer for Tranmere Rovers
- Ray Davies (footballer, born 1932) (1932–1984), Australian rules footballer for Fitzroy
- Ray Davies (footballer, born 1946), Australian rules footballer for North Melbourne
- Ray Davies (sailor) (active since 1997), New Zealand sailor
- Raymond Davies (athlete) (1933–2018), English javelin thrower

== See also ==
- Raymond Davies Hughes (1923–1999), RAF airman
- Raymond Davis (disambiguation)
