= Abraham Rosenthal =

Abraham Rosenthal is the name of:

- A. M. Rosenthal, Canadian journalist
- Abe Rosenthal, British former soccer player
