= Donald Partridge (disambiguation) =

Donald or Don Partridge may refer to

- Donald B. Partridge (1891–1946), American politician
- Don Partridge (footballer) (1925–2003), English footballer
- Don Partridge (1941–2010), English singer and songwriter
