= Norman Case =

Norman Case may refer to:

- Norman S. Case (1888–1967), Rhode Island politician
- Norman Case (footballer) (1925–1973), English footballer
