= Kapler =

Kapler is a surname, and may refer to:

- Aleksei Kapler (1903–1979), Soviet filmmaker, screenwriter, actor, and writer;
- Bruce Kapler (born 1953), musician;
- Gabe Kapler (born 1975), American major league baseball outfielder and manager;
- Konrad Kapler (1925–1991), Polish football player.
