= David Mycock =

David Mycock may refer to:

- David Mycock (footballer, born 1921), English football defender for Halifax Town and Wigan Athletic
- David Mycock (footballer, born 1969), English football defender for Rochdale
