= Ken Burns (footballer) =

Manx footballer (1923-2006)

Personal information
- Full name: Kinear Burns
- Date of birth: 24 September 1923
- Place of birth: Ramsey, Isle of Man
- Date of death: 5 May 2006 (aged 82)
- Place of death: Douglas, Isle of Man
- Position: Winger

Senior career*
Years	Team	Apps	(Gls)
1946–1947	Tranmere Rovers	14	(4)
1947–1948	Southport	5	(0)
Total		19	(4)
- * Club domestic league appearances and goals

Kinear Burns (1923 – 2006), more commonly known as Ken Burns, was a Manx footballer, who played as a winger in the Football League for Tranmere Rovers and Southport F.C.

== Career ==
After gaining notoriety in the Isle of Man Football League. Tranmere Rovers manager, Ernie Blackburn, traveled to the Isle of Man to offer Burns a professional contract. Burns was released after one season.

Southport F.C. offered Burns a 2 month trial but the club declined to offer Burns a contract for the rest of the season. Upon being released by Southport, Burns would return to the Isle of Man to continue his football career where he would play until his retirement at 60.

== Personal life ==
Burns worked on boats in the Isle of Man during the off seasons.

Burns worked as an electrical contractor in Ramsey up until his death.

== See also ==
- Manx Footballers
