= Harry Hubbick =

English footballer (1910-1992)

Personal information
- Full name: Henry Edward Hubbick
- Date of birth: 12 November 1910
- Place of birth: Jarrow, England
- Date of death: 18 March 1992 (aged 81)
- Place of death: Preston, England
- Height: 5 ft 8 1/2 in (1.74 m)
- Position: Left-back

Youth career
- Jarrow

Senior career*
Years	Team	Apps	(Gls)
- Blyth Spartans
- Spennymoor United
1935–1937	Burnley	58	(1)
1937–1947	Bolton Wanderers	128	(0)
1947–1949	Port Vale	50	(1)
1949–1950	Rochdale	90	(0)
- Lancaster City
- Caernarvon Town
- Llandudno
- Rhyl Athletic
Total		326+	(2+)
- * Club domestic league appearances and goals

Henry Edward Hubbick (12 November 1910 – 18 March 1992) was an English footballer who played professional football for Burnley, Bolton Wanderers, Port Vale, and Rochdale either side of World War II.

== Career ==
After leaving school, Hubbick worked as a coal miner. In his free time, he played football for Jarrow, Blyth Spartans and Spennymoor United before signing for professional club Burnley in 1935. Hubbick made his debut for Burnley on 19 October 1935 in a 1–0 win over Nottingham Forest and went on to make 32 appearances for the club that season. He scored his first goal for the club in a 2–2 draw with Manchester United on 10 April 1936. Hubbick kept his place in the side going into the 1936–37 season and missed only one match in the first five months of the campaign. He played his last Burnley match on 6 February 1937 in a 3–1 defeat to Southampton at Turf Moor. In February 1937, he left Burnley and joined Bolton Wanderers, moving up from the Second Division to the First Division.

Bolton finished one place and two points above the relegation zone in 1936–37. They then rose to seventh position in 1937–38 and then eighth place in 1938–39. With the outbreak of World War II football was cancelled. Hubbick went back to work in the pits, also guesting for Blackpool, Bury and Blackburn Rovers. Immediately after the war, Bolton manager Walter Rowley made him club captain. He led the club to an 18th-place finish in 1946–47.

Hubbick joined Gordon Hodgson's Port Vale for a £1,000 fee in October 1947. He played 30 Third Division South games in 1947–48, before making 21 league and cup appearances in 1948–49. He scored only his second goal in the Football League for the "Valiants" in a 3–0 win over Leyton Orient at the Old Recreation Ground on 25 December 1948.

He was sold to Rochdale in January 1949 for around £1,000, where he finished his professional career in 1950 at 40. Ted Goodier's "Dale" finished seventh in the Third Division North, and then third in 1949–50. After leaving Spotland with 90 league appearances to his name, he later played for Lancaster City as a player-coach before moving on to Welsh clubs Caernarvon Town, Llandudno and Rhyl Athletic. He later worked as Preston North End's physiotherapist.

== Career statistics ==
Appearances and goals by club, season and competition
Club	Season	League			FA Cup		Other		Total	
Club	Season	Division	Apps	Goals	Apps	Goals	Apps	Goals	Apps	Goals
Burnley	1935–36	Second Division	32	1	2	0	—		34	1
Burnley	1936–37	Second Division	26	0	3	0	—		29	0
Burnley	Total		58	1	5	0	0	0	63	1
Bolton Wanderers	1936–37	First Division	13	0	0	0	—		13	0
Bolton Wanderers	1937–38	First Division	40	0	1	0	—		41	0
Bolton Wanderers	1938–39	First Division	41	0	3	0	—		44	0
Bolton Wanderers	1939–40		—		0	0	3	1	3	1
Bolton Wanderers	1945–46		—		9	0	—		9	0
Bolton Wanderers	1946–47	First Division	34	0	3	0	—		37	0
Bolton Wanderers	Total		128	0	16	0	3	1	147	1
Port Vale	1947–48	Third Division South	30	0	1	0	—		31	0
Port Vale	1948–49	Third Division South	20	1	1	0	—		21	1
Port Vale	Total		50	1	2	0	0	0	52	1
Rochdale	1948–49	Third Division North	19	0	0	0	—		19	0
Rochdale	1949–50	Third Division North	42	0	2	0	—		44	0
Rochdale	1950–51	Third Division North	29	0	0	0	—		29	0
Rochdale	Total		90	0	2	0	0	0	92	0
Career total			326	2	25	0	3	1	354	3
