= Charlie Briggs (footballer) =

English footballer (1911–1993)

Personal information
- Full name: Charles Edward Briggs
- Date of birth: 4 April 1911
- Place of birth: Liphook, England
- Date of death: 29 January 1993 (aged 81)
- Place of death: Broxburn, Scotland
- Height: 6 ft 0 in (1.83 m)
- Position: Goalkeeper

Senior career*
Years	Team	Apps	(Gls)
–1930	Tottenham Hotspur		
1930–	Haywards Sports		
- Guildford City
1935	Fulham	0	(0)
1936	Crystal Palace	0	(0)
1937	Bradford Park Avenue	0	(0)
1937–1939	Halifax Town	53	(0)
1939–1947	Clyde	0	(0)
	→ Aldershot (guest)	63	(0)
	→ Halifax Town (guest)	73	(0)
	→ Fulham (guest)	1	(0)
1942–1943	→ Tottenham Hotspur (guest)	3	(0)
1943	→ Brentford (guest)	1	(0)
1947	Rochdale	12	(0)
1947–1948	Chesterfield	0	(0)
1948	Ransome & Marles		
1948	Ilkeston Town		
- * Club domestic league appearances and goals

Charles Edward Briggs (4 April 1911 – 29 January 1993) was an English professional footballer who played as a goalkeeper in the Football League for Halifax Town and Rochdale.

== Career statistics ==
Appearances and goals by club, season and competition
Club	Season	League			National Cup		Total	
Club	Season	Division	Apps	Goals	Apps	Goals	Apps	Goals
Rochdale	1946–47	Third Division North	4	0	0	0	4	0
Rochdale	1947–48	Third Division North	8	0	0	0	8	0
Career total			12	0	0	0	12	0
