= Cyril Brown =

English footballer

Personal information
- Full name: Cyril Brown
- Date of birth: 25 May 1918
- Place of birth: Ashington, England
- Date of death: 15 April 1990 (aged 71)
- Place of death: Dover, England
- Position: Inside forward

Senior career*
Years	Team	Apps	(Gls)
–1939	Felixstowe Town		
1939–1945	Brentford	0	(0)
1945–1946	Sunderland	0	(0)
1946–1947	Notts County	13	(5)
1947–1948	Boston United	18	(7)
1948–1950	Rochdale	61	(11)
1951–1952	Peterborough United	4	(2)
- * Club domestic league appearances and goals

Cyril Brown (25 May 1918 – 15 April 1990) was an English professional footballer who played as an inside forward in the Football League for Notts County and Rochdale.

== Career statistics ==
Appearances and goals by club, season and competition
Club	Season	League			FA Cup		Other		Total	
Club	Season	Division	Apps	Goals	Apps	Goals	Apps	Goals	Apps	Goals
Sunderland	1945–46	—			6	5	—		6	5
Notts County	1946–47	Third Division South	13	5	0	0	—		13	5
Boston United	1947–48	Midland League	17	7	0	0	2 (Note: 1 appearance in Lincolnshire Senior Cup, 1 appearance in Mather Cup)	0	19	7
Boston United	1948–49	Midland League	1	0	0	0	0	0	1	0
Boston United	Total		18	7	0	0	2	0	20	7
Rochdale	1948–49	Third Division North	9	3	0	0	0	0	9	3
Rochdale	1949–50	Third Division North	30	5	2	1	4 (Note: Appearances in Lancashire Senior Cup)	0	36	6
Rochdale	1950–51	Third Division North	22	3	2	0	0	0	24	3
Rochdale	Total		61	11	4	1	4	0	69	12
Peterborough United	1951–52	Midland League	4	2	0	0	—		4	2
Career total			96	25	10	6	6	0	122	31

== Honours ==
Boston United

- Mather Cup: 1948
