= Jimmy Maddison =

English footballer

Personal information
- Full name: James Maddison
- Date of birth: 9 November 1924
- Place of birth: South Shields, England
- Date of death: 7 June 1992 (aged 67)
- Place of death: South Shields, England
- Position: Outside left

Youth career
- –: Middlesbrough

Senior career*
Years	Team	Apps	(Gls)
1945–194?	Middlesbrough	1	(0)
1949–1950	Darlington	41	(7)
1950–1959	Grimsby Town	272	(40)
1959–1961	Chesterfield	98	(16)
1961–1962	Cambridge City	6	(1)
- * Club domestic league appearances and goals

James Maddison (9 November 1924 – 7 June 1992) was an English footballer who scored 63 goals from 412 appearances in the Football League playing at outside left for Middlesbrough, Darlington, Grimsby Town and Chesterfield. He went on to play non-league football for clubs including Cambridge City. His season at Cambridge City saw his first team opportunities limited and he spent most of the season playing for the reserves in the Eastern Counties League.
