= Ron Wynn (footballer) =

Welsh footballer

Personal information
- Full name: Walter Ronald Wynn
- Date of birth: 2 November 1923
- Place of birth: Wrexham, Wales
- Date of death: 8 October 1983 (aged 59)
- Place of death: Liverpool, England
- Position: Defender

Senior career*
Years	Team	Apps	(Gls)
- West New York
1948–1956	Wrexham	182	(12)
- Winsford United
- * Club domestic league appearances and goals

Walter Ronald Wynn (2 November 1923 – 8 October 1983) was a Welsh professional footballer who played as a defender. He made 182 appearances in the English Football League for Wrexham. He also played for West New York and Winsford United.

He also guested for Chester City during World War II.
