= Ray Molyneux =

English footballer

Personal information
- Full name: Raymond Molyneux
- Date of birth: 13 June 1930
- Place of birth: Kearsley, England
- Date of death: October 2014 (aged 84)
- Place of death: Bolton, England
- Position: Outside right

Senior career*
Years	Team	Apps	(Gls)
- Ashton United
1948–1953	Bradford City	2	(1)
- Bournemouth & Boscombe Athletic
- Oswestry Town
- * Club domestic league appearances and goals

Raymond Molyneux (13 June 1930 – October 2014) was an English professional footballer who played as an outside right.

== Career ==
Born in Kearsley, Molyneux joined Bradford City from Ashton United in December 1948. He made 2 league appearances for the club, scoring once. He left the club in February 1953 to join Bournemouth & Boscombe Athletic, and later also played for Oswestry Town. He then signed for Mossley making 32 appearances and scoring 4 goals in the 1955–56 season.

== Sources ==
- Frost, Terry (1988). Bradford City A Complete Record 1903-1988. Breedon Books Sport. ISBN 0-907969-38-0.
