= Bill Blackshaw =

English footballer

Personal information
- Date of birth: 6 September 1920
- Place of birth: Ashton-under-Lyne, England
- Date of death: 1994 (aged 73–74)
- Position: Winger

Youth career
- ?–1938: Audenshaw United

Senior career*
Years	Team	Apps	(Gls)
1938–1939	Manchester City	3	(0)
1946–1949	Oldham Athletic	67	(22)
1949–1951	Crystal Palace	32	(5)
1951–?	Rochdale	?	(?)
?	Stalybridge Celtic	?	(?)
- * Club domestic league appearances and goals

Bill Blackshaw (6 September 1920 – 1994) was an English professional footballer who played as a winger, in the Football League for Manchester City, Oldham Athletic, Crystal Palace and Rochdale. His first professional club was Manchester City but after only three appearances his career was interrupted by the Second World War. When football resumed thereafter, he moved on to play for Oldham Athletic and subsequently Crystal Palace and Rochdale. He later moved into non-league football with Stalybridge Celtic. Blackshaw retired in 1955.

Blackshaw died in 1994 aged 73 or 74.
