= Albert Quinn =

English footballer

Personal information
- Full name: Albert Quinn
- Date of birth: 18 April 1920
- Place of birth: Lanchester, County Durham, England
- Date of death: 26 June 2008 (aged 88)
- Place of death: Esh, County Durham, England
- Position: Inside forward

Youth career
- –: Esh Winning

Senior career*
Years	Team	Apps	(Gls)
1946–1948	Sunderland	6	(2)
1948–1951	Darlington	86	(42)
1951–195?	West Stanley		
- Consett
- * Club domestic league appearances and goals

Albert Quinn (18 April 1920 – 26 June 2008) was an English footballer who scored 44 goals from 92 appearances in the Football League playing for Sunderland and Darlington in the years following the Second World War. An inside forward, he went on to play non-league football for clubs including West Stanley and Consett.

== Life and career ==
Quinn was born in Lanchester, County Durham, in 1920. He signed for Sunderland in 1946, and made his debut early in the 1947–48 First Division season in a 4–2 win against Grimsby Town. According to the Sunderland Echo's match report, "despite his inexperience [he] showed a pleasing directness and unselfishness which was to be admired". He kept his place for the next two games, and when brought back in to face Liverpool in November, he scored twice in a 5–1 win. But by the end of the season, he had only made six appearances, and was allowed to leave for Third Division North club Darlington for a four-figure fee.

The Echo thought that at the age of 28, Quinn "might make an ideal Third Division forward, but he has reached the age when there was little hope of his advancement to First Division standard. He can hit a ball with that left foot of his as hard as anyone". He scored five goals in the first four fixtures of the 1948–49 season, was Darlington's top scorer in both that season and the next, and finished his three-year career with the club with 44 goals from 91 games in all competitions, 42 from 86 in the league.

He went on to play for West Stanley, making his debut in a 4–2 defeat to Hartlepools Reserves in August 1951, and continued to score goals, with a hat-trick against Sunderland Reserves in October and two goals in a 4–3 win in December at Ashington, previously unbeaten at home that season. By February 1956, he was playing for another North-Eastern League club, Consett.

Quinn died in Esh, County Durham, in 2008 at the age of 88.
