= Eric Hope (footballer) =

English footballer (1927–2009)

Personal information
- Full name: Eric Hope
- Date of birth: 2 December 1927
- Place of birth: Oakengates, England
- Date of death: 11 August 2009 (aged 81)
- Place of death: Telford, England
- Position: Inside forward

Youth career
- Manchester City

Senior career*
Years	Team	Apps	(Gls)
1946–1950	Manchester City	0	(0)
1950–1951	Shrewsbury Town	27	(3)
1951–1954	Wrexham	37	(9)
- Sankeys of Wellington
- * Club domestic league appearances and goals

Eric Hope (2 December 1927 – 11 August 2009) was an English professional footballer who played as an inside forward. He made appearances in the English Football League for Shrewsbury Town and Wrexham. Following his retirement from League play he worked as a production foreman at GKN Sankey in Telford, Shropshire and played for the works team.
