= Eric Betts (footballer) =

English footballer (1925–1990)

Personal information
- Full name: Eric Betts
- Date of birth: 27 June 1925
- Place of birth: Coventry, Warwickshire, England
- Date of death: 16 March 1990 (aged 64)
- Place of death: Rochdale, Greater Manchester, England
- Position: Winger

Senior career*
Years	Team	Apps	(Gls)
1946–1947	Mansfield Town	19	(5)
1947–1948	Coventry City	1	(0)
1948–1949	Nuneaton Borough		
1949–1950	Walsall	30	(3)
1950–1951	West Ham United	3	(1)
1951	Nuneaton Borough		
1951–1953	Rochdale	52	(8)
1953	Crewe Alexandra	25	(5)
1953–1956	Wrexham	53	(21)
1956–1957	Oldham Athletic	26	(5)
- Bangor City
- * Club domestic league appearances and goals

Eric Betts (27 June 1925 – 16 March 1990) was an English professional footballer who played as a winger. A journeyman throughout the 40s and 50s, Betts played for 10 different clubs throughout his career, 8 of which were in the English Football League.
