= Isle of Man national football team =

Isle of Man national football team may refer to:

- Ellan Vannin football team
- Isle of Man official football team
