= Reg Phillips (footballer, born 1921) =

Welsh footballer

Personal information
- Full name: Reginald Roydon Phillips
- Date of birth: 9 March 1921
- Place of birth: Llanelli, Wales
- Date of death: 1972 (aged 50–51)
- Place of death: Shrewsbury, England
- Position: Forward

Senior career*
Years	Team	Apps	(Gls)
- Shrewsbury Town
1949–1952	Crewe Alexandra	63	(35)
- * Club domestic league appearances and goals

Reginald Roydon Phillips (9 March 1921 – 1972) was a Welsh professional footballer who played as a forward for Shrewsbury Town and Crewe Alexandra.
