= Tom Hindle =

English footballer

Personal information
- Full name: Thomas Hindle
- Date of birth: 22 February 1921
- Place of birth: Keighley, England
- Date of death: 15 August 2011 (aged 90)
- Position: Winger

Senior career*
Years	Team	Apps	(Gls)
1943–1949	Leeds United	43	(2)
1949	York City	19	(3)
1949–1952	Halifax Town	85	(17)
1952	Rochdale	6	(1)
1952–1955	Wigan Athletic	104	(32)
- Nelson
- * Club domestic league appearances and goals

Tom Hindle (22 February 1921 – 15 August 2011) was an English footballer who played as a winger in The Football League for Leeds United, York City, Halifax Town, and Rochdale. Towards the end of his career, he also played in the Lancashire Combination for Wigan Athletic and Nelson.

Born in Keighley, West Yorkshire, Hindle started his career in the local leagues before joining Leeds United from Keighley Town in September 1943.
