= Arthur Cunliffe =

English footballer (1909–1986)

Personal information
- Full name: Arthur Cunliffe
- Date of birth: 5 February 1909
- Place of birth: Blackrod, England
- Date of death: 28 August 1986 (aged 77)
- Place of death: Bournemouth, England
- Position: Winger

Senior career*
Years	Team	Apps	(Gls)
1929–1933	Blackburn Rovers	129	(47)
1933–1935	Aston Villa	69	(11)
1935–1937	Middlesbrough	27	(5)
1937–1938	Burnley	9	(0)
1938–1945	Hull City	42	(20)
1945–1947	Rochdale	23	(5)

International career
1932	England	2	(0)
- * Club domestic league appearances and goals

Arthur Cunliffe (5 February 1909 – 28 August 1986) was an English professional footballer who played as a winger. In 1932 he was awarded two caps for the England national football team.

His cousin was Jimmy Cunliffe, also a footballer.
