= Johnny Linaker =

English footballer

Personal information
- Full name: John Edward Linaker
- Date of birth: 14 January 1927
- Place of birth: Southport, England
- Date of death: 14 June 2013 (aged 86)
- Place of death: Shipton, North Yorkshire, England
- Position: Right winger

Senior career*
Years	Team	Apps	(Gls)
- Everton (amateur)
1945–1946	Manchester City	0	(0)
1946–1947	Southport	15	(1)
1947–1950	Nottingham Forest	15	(2)
1950–1951	York City	59	(16)
1951–1953	Hull City	26	(3)
1953–1956	York City	39	(4)
- Scarborough
1957–1958	Crewe Alexandra	34	(3)
- Ashington
- * Club domestic league appearances and goals

John Edward Linaker (14 January 1927 – 14 June 2013) was an English footballer.

== Career ==
Linaker came to prominence during wartime football, during which he played for Everton as an amateur and Manchester City, who he joined in August 1945. After making no league appearances for City, he joined Southport in November 1946. He joined Nottingham Forest in September 1947, after making 15 appearances and scoring one goal in the league for Southport. He joined York City in June 1950 after making 15 appearances and scoring two goals in the league for Forest. His form for the club attracted attention and joined Hull City in October 1951, after making 63 appearances and scoring 16 goals for York. He made 26 appearances and scored three goals for Hull before re-joining York in May 1953. He joined non-league side Scarborough after making 40 appearances and scoring four goals for York in his second spell with the club. He returned to the Football League with Crewe Alexandra in July 1957. He joined Ashington after making 34 appearances and scoring three goals in the league for Crewe.
