= Tommy Varty =

English footballer

Personal information
- Full name: Thomas Heppell Varty
- Date of birth: 2 December 1921
- Place of birth: Newcastle upon Tyne, England
- Date of death: April 2004 (aged 82)
- Place of death: Enfield, London, England
- Positions: Inside forward; wing half

Senior career*
Years	Team	Apps	(Gls)
1939–1942	Newcastle United	0	(0)
1944–1950	Darlington	162	(33)
1950–1951	Watford	34	(5)
Total		196	(38)
- * Club domestic league appearances and goals

Thomas Heppell Varty (2 December 1921 – April 2004) was an English footballer who scored 38 goals from 196 appearances in the Football League playing as an inside forward or wing half for Darlington and Watford in the years following the Second World War.

Varty was born in Newcastle upon Tyne, and began his football career with his hometown club, Newcastle United, as an amateur just before the Second World War. He moved on to Darlington during the war, and turned professional with that club in 1945. In 1946, he scored once as the Football Association's representative team beat a Universities Athletic Union XI by ten goals to one. Varty was a regular in Darlington's first team in the Third Division North, missing only six games over four seasons. He then spent the 1950–51 Football League season with Third Division South club Watford, which took his total league appearances to 196, before returning to his native north-east of England to pursue business interests.
