= Len Hewitt =

Welsh footballer

Personal information
- Full name: Leonard Hewitt
- Date of birth: 20 March 1920
- Place of birth: Wrexham, Wales
- Date of death: 24 May 1979 (aged 59)
- Place of death: Rhostyllen, Wrexham, Wales
- Position: Forward

Senior career*
Years	Team	Apps	(Gls)
1946–1947	Wrexham	5	(2)
- Altrincham
- * Club domestic league appearances and goals

Leonard Hewitt (20 March 1920 – 24 May 1979) was a Welsh professional footballer, who played as a forward. He made appearances in the English Football League with Wrexham. He also played non-league football for Altrincham.
