= Tom Doonan =

Scottish footballer (1922–1998)

Personal information
- Full name: Thomas Doonan
- Date of birth: 5 October 1922
- Place of birth: West Calder, Scotland
- Date of death: December 1998 (aged 76)
- Place of death: Bradford, England
- Position: Striker

Senior career*
Years	Team	Apps	(Gls)
1944–1946	Partick Thistle	0	(0)
1946–1949	Albion Rovers	16	(5)
1949–1950	Bradford City	13	(7)
1950–1951	Tranmere Rovers	4	(2)
- Bangor City
Total		33	(14)
- * Club domestic league appearances and goals

Thomas Doonan (5 October 1922 – December 1998) was a Scottish professional footballer who played as a striker.

== Career ==
Born in West Calder, Doonan played for Partick Thistle, Albion Rovers, Bradford City, Tranmere Rovers and Bangor City.
