= Paul Todd (footballer) =

English footballer

Personal information
- Full name: Paul Raymond Todd
- Date of birth: 8 May 1920
- Place of birth: Middlesbrough, England
- Position: Inside forward

Senior career*
Years	Team	Apps	(Gls)
1946−1950	Doncaster Rovers	160	(49)
1950−1952	Blackburn Rovers	46	(12)
1952−1953	Hull City	27	(3)
1953−1957	King's Lynn		
1962	Boston United	1	(0)

Managerial career
- 1953−1957: King's Lynn
- 1961−1963: Boston United
- 1964l3−1966: Boston
- Worksop Town
- * Club domestic league appearances and goals

Paul Raymond Todd (8 May 1920 – October 2000) was an English footballer who played as an inside forward in the Football League for Doncaster Rovers, Blackburn Rovers and Hull City.

Being stationed in the RAF near Doncaster during the war, Todd turned out for Doncaster 36 times in the wartime leagues. He was also captain of the RAF Command team in Ceylon. With the war over and League football recommencing, he signed for Doncaster and became a regular for the next four seasons, becoming captain under manager Peter Doherty. In his first season, he scored 26 goals from 44 appearances.

He moved to then high-flying Blackburn Rovers, and then to Hull City.

For the 1953–54 E season he became player-manager of Kings Lynn, scoring 36 times in his 56 league and cup games, as well as taking them to win the Eastern Counties League and the Norfolk Senior Cup. He remained there for three more seasons as they played in the Midland League.

Between 1961 and 1963 he managed Boston United in the Central Alliance League. At the end of his first season in a game against Wilmorton, Todd at 42 stepped in to play when one of his team failed to show. That first season saw United win the Central Alliance League and the Central Alliance Cup.

He moved to become the first manager of Boston when they were formed in 1963 as Boston United entered serious financial straits, taking with him many of the players from United. He led them to a Lincolnshire League title in their first season and a Central Alliance title the following season. He later managed Worksop Town.
