= Teddy Rothwell =

English footballer

Ted Rothwell
Personal information
- Full name: Edward Rothwell
- Date of birth: 3 September 1917
- Place of birth: Atherton, England
- Date of death: 10 April 2000 (aged 83)
- Position: Winger

Senior career*
Years	Team	Apps	(Gls)
1937–1949	Bolton Wanderers	48	(2)
1949–1951	Southport	40	(5)
Total		88	(7)
- * Club domestic league appearances and goals

Edward Rothwell (3 September 1917 – 10 April 2000) was an English footballer who played in the Football League for Bolton Wanderers and Southport.
