= Billy Allen =

English footballer

Personal information
- Full name: William Allen
- Date of birth: 22 October 1917
- Place of birth: Newburn, Newcastle upon Tyne, England
- Date of death: 1981 (aged 63–64)
- Position: Inside forward

Senior career*
Years	Team	Apps	(Gls)
1938	Chesterfield	2	(0)
1946–1950	York City	130	(23)
1950–1952	Scunthorpe United	64	(1)
- * Club domestic league appearances and goals

William Allen (22 October 1917 – 1981) was an English footballer.

Allen joined York City from Chesterfield in 1950. He then moved to Scunthorpe United in 1950, where he retired in 1952.
