= Stewart Williamson =

English footballer

Personal information
- Full name: Stewart Henry Williamson
- Date of birth: 7 April 1926
- Place of birth: Wallasey, England
- Date of death: 24 June 2008 (aged 82)
- Place of death: Lymington, England
- Position: Winger

Senior career*
Years	Team	Apps	(Gls)
- Harrogate Hotspurs
1946–1953	Tranmere Rovers	92	(21)
1953–1955	Swindon Town	17	(0)
- Merthyr Tydfil
- * Club domestic league appearances and goals

Stewart "Stewie" Henry Williamson (7 April 1926 – 24 June 2008) was an English footballer who played as a winger in the Football League for Tranmere Rovers and Swindon Town.
