= Frank Tomlinson =

English footballer

Personal information
- Full name: Francis Tomlinson
- Date of birth: 23 October 1925
- Place of birth: Manchester, England
- Date of death: 2007 (aged 81–82)
- Place of death: Gloucester, England
- Position: Winger

Youth career
- Goslings

Senior career*
Years	Team	Apps	(Gls)
1946–1951	Oldham Athletic	115	(28)
1951–1952	Rochdale	20	(2)
1952–1953	Chester	11	(0)
- Ashton United
Total		146	(30)
- * Club domestic league appearances and goals

Frank Tomlinson (1925–2007) was a footballer who played as a winger in the Football League for Oldham Athletic, Rochdale and Chester.
