= Ron Barritt =

English footballer (1919–2004)

Personal information
- Full name: Ronald Barritt
- Date of birth: 15 April 1919
- Place of birth: Huddersfield, West Riding of Yorkshire, England
- Date of death: June 2004 (aged 85)
- Place of death: Huddersfield, West Riding of Yorkshire, England
- Height: 5 ft 9 in (1.75 m)
- Position: Striker

Senior career*
Years	Team	Apps	(Gls)
- Wombwell Town
1949–1950	Doncaster Rovers	13	(5)
1950–1951	Frickley Colliery		
1951–1952	Leeds United	6	(1)
1952–1953	York City	5	(0)
Total		24	(5)
- * Club domestic league appearances and goals

Ronald Barritt (15 April 1919 – June 2004) was an English professional footballer who played as a striker in the Football League for Doncaster Rovers, Leeds United and York City, and in non-League football for Wombwell Town and Frickley Colliery.
