= Hughie McMahon =

English footballer

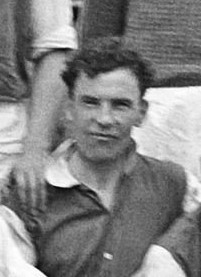
- Hughie McMahon in 1948

Personal information
- Full name: Hugh McMahon
- Date of birth: 24 September 1909
- Place of birth: Grangetown, North Yorkshire, England
- Date of death: October 1986 (aged 77)
- Place of death: Middlesbrough, England
- Height: 5 ft 8 in (1.73 m)
- Position: Winger

Senior career*
Years	Team	Apps	(Gls)
1928–1929	Upton's		
1929–1930	South Bank St Peter's		
1930–1932	Mexborough Town		
1932–1933	Reading	1	(0)
1932	→ Mexborough Town (loan)		
1933–1934	Southend United	10	(3)
1934–1936	Reading	10	(2)
1936–1937	Queens Park Rangers	41	(3)
1937–1939	Sunderland	8	(1)
1945–1947	Hartlepools United	28	(7)
1947–1949	Rotherham United	59	(8)
1949–19??	Stockton		
- * Club domestic league appearances and goals

Hughie McMahon (24 September 1909 – October 1986) was an English professional footballer who played as a winger for Queens Park Rangers and Sunderland.
