= Fred Howe (footballer, born 1912) =

English footballer (1912–1984)

Personal information
- Date of birth: 24 September 1912
- Place of birth: Bredbury, Cheshire, England
- Date of death: 1984 (aged 71–72)
- Position: Centre forward

Youth career
- 1929–1930: Wilmslow
- 1930–1931: Hyde United

Senior career*
Years	Team	Apps	(Gls)
1931–1933	Stockport County	2	(3)
1933–1935	Hyde United		
1935–1938	Liverpool	89	(36)
1938–1938	Manchester City	6	(5)
1938–1939	Grimsby Town	29	(15)
1940–1945	Watford		
1946–1947	Oldham Athletic	30	(20)
1947–1951	Ashton United F.C.		
- * Club domestic league appearances and goals

Fred Howe (24 September 1912 – 1984) was an English professional footballer who played as a centre forward. In his career, he played for Stockport County, Hyde United, Liverpool, Manchester City, Grimsby Town, Watford, Oldham Athletic, and Ashton United.

In the 1936–37 season, Howe became the first Liverpool player to score a hat-trick in an away match against Manchester United. He remained the only player to do so until Mohamed Salah repeated the feat in October 2021.
