= Archie Hughes (footballer, born 1919) =

Welsh footballer

Personal information
- Date of birth: 2 February 1919
- Place of birth: Colwyn Bay, Wales
- Date of death: 1992 (aged 72–73)
- Position: Goalkeeper

Youth career
- Newry Town

Senior career*
| Years | Team | Apps | (Gls) |
| 1939–1946 | Huddersfield Town | 0 | (0) |
| 1946–1948 | Tottenham Hotspur | 2 | (0) |
| 1948–1950 | Blackburn Rovers | 27 | (0) |
| 1950 | Nelson | | |
| 1950–1951 | Rochdale | 9 | (0) |
| 1951–1952 | Crystal Palace | 18 | (0) |
- Canterbury City
| Total | | 56 | (0) |

International career
| | Wales | 5 | (0) |
- * Club domestic league appearances and goals

William Arthur Hughes (2 February 1919 – 11 March 1992) was a Welsh professional footballer, who played as a goalkeeper for Huddersfield Town, Tottenham Hotspur, Blackburn Rovers, Nelson, Rochdale and Crystal Palace. He also won five caps for the Wales national football team.
