= Ken Crowther =

English footballer

Personal information
- Full name: Kenneth Crowther
- Date of birth: 17 December 1924
- Place of birth: Halifax, England
- Date of death: June 1994 (aged 69)
- Place of death: Halifax, England
- Position: Right half

Senior career*
Years	Team	Apps	(Gls)
- Halifax Town
1945–1948	Burnley	0	(0)
1948–1949	Bradford (Park Avenue)	6	(1)
1950–1951	Rochdale	2	(0)
- Nelson
Total		8	(1)
- * Club domestic league appearances and goals

Kenneth Crowther (17 December 1924 – June 1994) was an English professional footballer who played as a right half for Bradford (Park Avenue) and Rochdale.
