= Les Forster =

English footballer (1915–1986)

Personal information
- Full name: Leslie James Forster
- Date of birth: 22 July 1915
- Place of birth: Byker, England
- Date of death: 1986 (aged 70–71)
- Position: Winger

Senior career*
Years	Team	Apps	(Gls)
19??–1938	Walker Central	?	(?)
1938–1939	Blackpool	2	(0)
1946–1947	York City	10	(2)
1947–1948	Gateshead	14	(3)
1948–19??	Blackhall Colliery Welfare	?	(?)
- * Club domestic league appearances and goals

Leslie James Forster (22 July 1915 – 1986) was an English footballer who played as a winger.

Forster started his career with non-league Walker Central before joining Blackpool in 1938, where he made 2 first team appearances. After World War II, Forster joined York City. He scored 2 goals in 10 appearances before leaving to join Gateshead in 1947. Forster made 15 league and cup appearances for Gateshead, scoring 3 goals. Forster joined non-league Blackhall Colliery Welfare in 1948.

== Sources ==
- "allfootballers.com". Archived from the original on 22 July 2008.
- "Post War English & Scottish Football League A–Z Player's Transfer Database".
