= Frank Fidler =

English footballer

Personal information
- Full name: Frank Fidler
- Date of birth: 12 August 1924
- Place of birth: Middleton, England
- Date of death: 21 November 2009 (aged 85)
- Place of death: Farnborough, Hampshire, England
- Height: 1.85 m (6 ft 1 in)
- Position: Forward

Senior career*
| Years | Team | Apps | (Gls) |
| 1941–???? | Manchester United | 0 | (0) |
- Witton Albion
| 1950–1951 | Wrexham | 36 | (15) |
| 1951–1952 | Leeds United | 22 | (8) |
| 1952–1955 | Bournemouth | 61 | (32) |
| 1955–1957 | Yeovil Town | | |
| 1957–1960 | Hereford United | 105 | (63) |
| 1960–???? | Bridgwater Town | | |
- * Club domestic league appearances and goals

Frank Fidler (12 August 1924 – 21 November 2009) was an English footballer who played as a forward, making Football League appearances for three clubs.

== Career ==
Fidler started his career at Manchester United, however only made one amateur appearances for them during The War.

He would be released to non-league Witton Albion, where he holds the record for the second-highest goalscorer in the club's history.

He would make his first football league appearances with Wrexham, before moving to Leeds United in 1951 and then Bournemouth in 1952.

He'd then move back to non-league football with Yeovil Town in 1955, before going to Hereford United and then finishing his career at Bridgwater Town.

== Post-career and death ==
After football he worked for Westlands Helicopter Division as a shop steward, before moving to Farnborough to work for the Royal Mail until his retirement.

He died on 21 November 2009 in Farnborough.
