= Gordon Medd =

English footballer (1925 – 1996)

Personal information
- Full name: Gordon Ernest Medd
- Date of birth: 17 August 1925
- Place of birth: Birmingham, England
- Date of death: January 1996 (aged 70)
- Place of death: Blackpool, Lancashire, England
- Height: 5 ft 9 in (1.75 m)
- Position: Winger

Senior career*
Years	Team	Apps	(Gls)
- Worcester City
1946–	Birmingham City	0	(0)
- Worcester City
1949–1950	Walsall	22	(2)
1950–1951	Rochdale	5	(1)
1951	York City	1	(0)
- Sutton Coldfield Town
Total		28	(3)
- * Club domestic league appearances and goals

Gordon Ernest Medd (17 August 1925 – January 1996) was an English professional footballer who played as a winger in the Football League for Walsall, Rochdale and York City, in non-League football for Worcester City and Sutton Coldfield Town, and was on the books of Birmingham City without making a league appearance.

After his Football League career, Medd continued in non-league football with clubs including Worcester City and Sutton Coldfield Town. His playing history reflects the typical career pathway of many mid-20th-century English footballers, who frequently moved between league and semi-professional football structures during the post-war restructuring of the English game.
