= John Meaney (footballer) =

English footballer (1919–2000)

John Francis Meaney (19 November 1919 – 13 January 2000) was an English professional footballer who played as a wing half or inside forward for Crewe Alexandra in the late 1940s and early 1950s.

Meaney was born in Stoke-on-Trent on 19 November 1919. He first signed for Wolves in 1939, but the outbreak of war interrupted his career. After his active service, he was expected to join either Port Vale or Stoke City. He joined Crewe on 1 March 1947 from non-league north Staffordshire side Ravensdale, and played as a wing half or inside forward, before converting to a left half.

Meaney made his Crewe debut on 22 March 1947 against New Brighton, and scored his first Crewe goal on his second appearance, against Rochdale at Gresty Road, on 29 March 1947. He made 11 appearances, scoring seven times, before the season ended. During his time at Crewe, Meaney scored 38 goals (including a brace against Plymouth Argyle on 9 December 1950). He made 288 appearances before retiring from football in 1954.

After his football career, Meaney was a publican in the Potteries, running the Masons Arms in Tunstall and later the Bell and Bear in Shelton. He then worked for twenty years as a driver for a removal company. He died in Staffordshire on 13 January 2000, at the age of 80.
