= Walter Price (footballer, born 1921) =

English footballer

Personal information
- Date of birth: 14 February 1921
- Place of birth: Neston, England
- Date of death: February 1984 (aged 62)
- Place of death: King's Lynn, Norfolk, England
- Position: Centre half

Senior career*
Years	Team	Apps	(Gls)
1946–1947	Tranmere Rovers	3	(1)
1948–1949	Rochdale	1	(0)
- King's Lynn
Total		4	(1)
- * Club domestic league appearances and goals

Walter Price (1921-1984) was a footballer who played as a centre half in the Football League for Tranmere Rovers.
