= George McGeachie (footballer, born 1918) =

English footballer (1918–1972)

Personal information
- Full name: George McGeachie
- Date of birth: 26 October 1918
- Place of birth: Calderbank, Scotland
- Date of death: 12 November 1972 (aged 54)
- Position: Defender

Senior career*
Years	Team	Apps	(Gls)
- St Johnstone
1946–1948	New Brighton	63	(4)
1948	Leyton Orient	0	(0)
1948–1951	Rochdale	90	(6)
1951–1952	Crystal Palace	46	(5)
1952–	Wigan Athletic		
- * Club domestic league appearances and goals

George McGeachie (26 October 1918 – 12 November 1972) was a Scottish footballer who played as a defender. Most notably for Crystal Palace and Rochdale.
