= Vince Dillon =

English footballer and manager

Personal information
- Date of birth: 2 October 1923
- Place of birth: Manchester, England
- Date of death: September 2005 (aged 81)
- Place of death: Truro, England
- Position: Centre forward

Senior career*
Years	Team	Apps	(Gls)
1947–1952	Bolton Wanderers	17	(2)
1952–1953	Tranmere Rovers	33	(17)
1953–	Truro City		
1955–56	Falmouth Town	29	(26)
Total		50	(19)

Managerial career
- 1953–: Truro City
- * Club domestic league appearances and goals

Vince Dillon (2 October 1923 – September 2005) was an English footballer who played as a centre forward for Bolton Wanderers, Tranmere Rovers and Truro City. He went on to become player-manager at Truro. He was player-coach at Falmouth Town for the 1955–56 season.
