= Pat Johnston =

Irish footballer

Personal information
- Full name: Christopher Patrick Johnston
- Date of birth: 16 July 1924
- Place of birth: Dublin, Ireland
- Date of death: 25 May 1971 (aged 46)
- Position: Wing half

Senior career*
Years	Team	Apps	(Gls)
1946–1947	Shelbourne		
1947–1949	Middlesbrough	3	(0)
1949–1957	Grimsby Town	250	(16)
1957–195?	Skegness Town		

International career
	League of Ireland XI	3	(0)
- * Club domestic league appearances and goals

Christopher Patrick "Pat" Johnston (16 July 1924 – 25 May 1971) was an Irish professional footballer who played as a wing half.
