= Matt Patrick (footballer) =

Scottish footballer

Personal information
- Date of birth: 13 June 1919
- Place of birth: Slamannan, Scotland
- Date of death: 14 July 2005 (aged 86)
- Place of death: York, England
- Positions: Winger; inside forward

Senior career*
Years	Team	Apps	(Gls)
	Cowdenbeath	0	(0)
1946–1953	York City	248	(47)
- * Club domestic league appearances and goals

Matthew Patrick (13 June 1919 – 14 July 2005) was a Scottish footballer.

Patrick joined York City from Cowdenbeath in 1946. He later retired at the club.
