= Jock Shearer =

Scottish footballer and coach

Personal information
- Full name: John McMillan Shearer
- Date of birth: 8 July 1917
- Place of birth: Dunfermline, Scotland
- Date of death: 3 April 1979 (aged 61)
- Place of death: Surrey, England
- Position: Inside forward

Senior career*
Years	Team	Apps	(Gls)
1946	Derby County	0	(0)
1946–1949	Bradford City	75	(17)
1949–1951	Grimsby Town	34	(9)
Total		109	(26)

Managerial career
- 1951–1953: Sligo Rovers
- * Club domestic league appearances and goals

John McMillan Shearer (8 July 1917 – 3 April 1979) was a Scottish professional football player and coach.

== Career ==
After serving with the British Army during World War Two, Shearer signed a professional contract with Derby County in 1946. He left later that same year to sign for Bradford City, where he spent three seasons before moving to Grimsby Town.

After retiring as a player in 1951, Shearer became manager of Irish club Sligo Rovers.
