= Ray Weigh =

Welsh footballer

Personal information
- Date of birth: 23 June 1928
- Place of birth: Flint, Wales
- Date of death: 4 June 2015 (aged 86)
- Position: Forward

Senior career*
Years	Team	Apps	(Gls)
1948–1949	Shrewsbury Town		
1949–1951	Bournemouth	28	(8)
1951–1954	Stockport County	75	(29)
1954–1957	Shrewsbury Town	107	(43)
1957–1958	Aldershot	11	(1)
- Dorchester Town
Total		221	(81)
- * Club domestic league appearances and goals

Ray Weigh (23 June 1928 – 4 June 2015) was a Welsh footballer who played in the Football League for Aldershot, Bournemouth, Shrewsbury Town and Stockport County.
