= Jim Nicholls =

English footballer

Personal information
- Full name: James Henry Nicholls
- Date of birth: 27 November 1919
- Place of birth: Coseley, England
- Date of death: 2002 (aged 82–83)
- Position: Goalkeeper

Senior career*
Years	Team	Apps	(Gls)
1946–1951	Bradford Park Avenue	36	(0)
1951–1953	Rochdale	50	(0)
1957	Toronto Ulster United		
- * Club domestic league appearances and goals

James Henry Nicholls (27 November 1919 – 2002) was an English footballer who played as a goalkeeper in the Football League for Bradford Park Avenue and Rochdale. In 1957, he played in the National Soccer League with Toronto Ulster United.
