= Ray Powell (Welsh footballer) =

Welsh footballer

Personal information
- Full name: Raymond Powell
- Date of birth: 5 August 1924
- Place of birth: Morriston, Wales
- Date of death: May 2014 (aged 89)
- Place of death: Essex, England
- Position: Centre forward

Senior career*
Years	Team	Apps	(Gls)
194?–1947	Haverfordwest Athletic		
1947–1951	Swansea Town	18	(5)
1951–1952	Scunthorpe & Lindsey United	31	(14)
1952–1956	Kettering Town		
1956–195?	Banbury Spencer		

Managerial career
- Wellingborough Town (player-manager)
- * Club domestic league appearances and goals

Raymond Powell (5 August 1924 – May 2014) was a Welsh professional footballer who played as a centre forward in the Football League for Swansea Town and Scunthorpe & Lindsey United. He played non-league football for Haverfordwest Athletic, Kettering Town, Banbury Spencer and Wellingborough Town, where he was player-manager.

== Life and career ==
Powell was born in 1924 in Morriston, Swansea, and attended Glanmôr School. He was called up to the Royal Air Force during the Second World War, and met his future wife while serving in South Africa. He played both football and rugby during the war for RAF teams and football for Cambridge Town, Morriston and Haverfordwest Athletic. While playing against Swansea Town in 1947, Powell impressed that club's manager enough to take him on as a professional. He scored freely for the reserve side, but played little first-team football – after his first season, in which he scored four goals from 13 Football League matches, he made just 6 first-team appearances in any competition in three years. In 1951, Powell joined Third Division North club Scunthorpe & Lindsey United. He stayed for only one season, in which he was the club's top scorer with 14 league goals, and then left the professional game. He remained in non-league football, playing part-time for Kettering Town and Banbury Spencer and acting as player-manager of Wellingborough Town, until moving to Romford, Essex, in 1961 and working as company secretary of a security firm. Powell died in Essex in 2014 at the age of 89.
