= Bill Jennings (footballer, born 1920) =

English footballer

Personal information
- Full name: Henry William Jennings
- Date of birth: 7 January 1920
- Place of birth: Norwich, England
- Date of death: 4 September 1969 (aged 49)
- Place of death: Leamington Spa, England

Senior career*
| Years | Team | Apps | (Gls) |
| 1938–1947 | Northampton Town | 11 | (2) |
| 1947–1951 | Ipswich Town | 102 | (41) |
| 1951 | Rochdale | 3 | (1) |
| Total | | 116 | (44) |
- * Club domestic league appearances and goals

Henry William Jennings (7 January 1920 – 4 September 1969) was a professional footballer.

During his career he played for Ipswich Town, Northampton Town and Rochdale.
