= Paddy McIlvenny (footballer, born 1924) =

Northern Irish footballer (1924–2013)

Personal information
- Full name: Patrick Dennis McIlvenny
- Date of birth: 11 September 1924
- Place of birth: Belfast, Northern Ireland
- Date of death: 6 March 2013 (aged 88)
- Place of death: Burgess Hill, England
- Height: 5 ft 7 in (1.70 m)
- Position: Right half

Senior career*
Years	Team	Apps	(Gls)
- Distillery
1947–1950	Merthyr Tydfil		
1950	Glenavon		
1950–1951	Cardiff City	0	(0)
1951–1955	Brighton & Hove Albion	60	(5)
1955–195?	Aldershot	16	(0)
- Hastings United
- Dover

Managerial career
- 1961–196?: Southwick
- * Club domestic league appearances and goals

Patrick Dennis McIlvenny (11 September 1924 – 6 March 2013) was a Northern Irish professional footballer who played in the Football League as a wing half for Brighton & Hove Albion and Aldershot in the 1950s. He also played in Northern Ireland for Distillery and Glenavon, was on the books of Cardiff City without playing for their first team, and appeared in the Southern League for Merthyr Tydfil, Hastings United and Dover.

== Life and career ==
McIlvenny was born in Belfast in 1924, and named after his father, the Ireland international footballer Paddy McIlvenny. His younger brother Bobby also played in the Football League.

McIlvenny was on the books of Distillery as an amateur before signing for Merthyr Tydfil of the Southern League in 1947. He played alongside his brother Bobby in the team that won the 1947–48 Southern League title. Both contributed to Merthyr reaching the final of the 1948–49 Welsh Cup, but only Bobby was a member of the eleven that won the trophy for the first time in the club's history. In late 1949, McIlvenny returned to Ireland apparently without his club's permission. A few weeks later, he joined Irish League club Glenavon, having reportedly been released at his own request after Merthyr reneged on a promise of a house when he married.

He signed for Cardiff City later that year, but never made the breakthrough to their first team, and moved on to Brighton & Hove Albion in 1951. Kept out of the team by Jess Willard in his first season, he was a regular thereafter until, in March 1954, torn knee cartilage effectively ended his Albion career. Although the club offered him a new contract, he was unable to agree terms, and joined another Third Division South club, Aldershot, in December 1955. After 16 league appearances, McIlvenny returned to the Southern League with Hastings United and Dover, and then managed Sussex County League side Southwick.

After leaving professional football, McIlvenny set up and ran a building firm in the Brighton area. He was an active golfer, captained the Sussex county team in the 1970s, and was a vice-president of the Sussex Golf Union. He died in a Burgess Hill care home in 2013 at the age of 88.
