= Paddy McIlvenny (footballer, born 1900) =

Irish footballer (1900–1955)

Personal information
- Full name: Patrick McIlvenny
- Date of birth: 18 November 1900
- Place of birth: Belfast, Ireland
- Height: 5 ft 7 in (1.70 m)
- Position: Centre forward

Senior career*
Years	Team	Apps	(Gls)
1917	Distillery		
1917–1921	Highfield		
1921–1924	Distillery		
1924–1925	Cardiff City	5	(2)
1925–1927	Sheffield Wednesday	1	(1)
1927–192?	Shelbourne		(22)
1928–1929	Northampton Town	8	(2)
1930–1931	Boston Town		
1931–193?	Hinckley United		

International career
1924	Ireland	1	(0)
- * Club domestic league appearances and goals

Patrick McIlvenny (18 November 1900 – 1955), known as Paddy or Patsy McIlvenny, was an Irish professional footballer who played as a centre forward or centre half.

== Early years ==
Patrick was born in Belfast and attempted to join the War effort in 1917 by signing up for the 4th Battalion of The Royal Irish Rifles. Patrick had claimed to be 18 years old on his application, and was soon found out and dismissed. At age 17, Patrick had his debut with Lisburn Distillery F.C. He did not stay for long and instead played for Falls League team, Highfield

== Success with Distillery ==
He achieved success upon returning to Distillery for the 1922-23 season scoring 15 goals. On 19 May 1923 during a match with Glentoran, Mcilvenny scored a goal with such force that the ball smashed through the netting.

== Move to the English League ==
In May 1924, Patrick accepted a transfer to Cardiff City for a fee of £500. Patrick did not see as much first team action as he had done at Distillery but on 28 February 1925, Patrick is noted as scoring a header against Newcastle United F.C. After his time at Cardiff, he moved to Sheffield Wednesday and Northampton Town in the 1920s, and was capped once for Ireland, against Wales on 15 March 1924 in the 1923–24 British Home Championship. He also played domestically for Distillery and in English non-league football for Boston Town and Hinckley United.

Two of his sons, Paddy and Bobby, also played in the Football League.

== Later life and death ==
Patrick settled down and had a new family in the town of Hinckley and had two other sons, John and Peter. A newspaper article from 1 December 1953 states how Patrick wants to make it clear that his son John is not a Scot, and is native to Hinckley as John has recently been signed for Bristol Rovers F.C. Patrick's son John also played for West Bromwich Albion F.C. Patrick died in Coventry in 1955, he had spent his later years as a Millwright.
