= Fred Fisher (footballer, born 1920) =

English footballer

Personal information
- Full name: Frederick Thomas Fisher
- Date of birth: 12 January 1920
- Place of birth: Wednesbury, England
- Date of death: 1993 (aged 72–73)
- Height: 5 ft 9 in (1.75 m)
- Position: Full-back

Senior career*
Years	Team	Apps	(Gls)
1936–1937	Fallings Heath	166	(0)
1937–1951	Grimsby Town	1	(0)
1951–1952	Rochdale		
1952–1953	Boston United		
1953–1954	Spalding United		
1954–1955	Wisbech Town		
1955–1956	Barton Town		
1956–195?	Alford United		
- * Club domestic league appearances and goals

Frederick Thomas Fisher (12 January 1920 – 1993) was an English professional footballer who played as a full-back.
