= Konrad Kapler =

Polish footballer

Personal information
- Full name: Konrad Kapler
- Date of birth: 25 February 1925
- Place of birth: Tychy, Poland
- Date of death: 23 October 1991 (aged 66)
- Place of death: Rochdale, England
- Position: Winger

Senior career*
Years	Team	Apps	(Gls)
- Forres Mechanics
1947–1949	Celtic	7	(0)
1949–1950	Rochdale	4	(0)
1950-1951	Morecambe	37	(2)
1951–1957	Altrincham	223	(30)
1957-1958	Congleton Town	21	(2)
1957–1958	Stalybridge Celtic		
1958–1959	Mossley		
- * Club domestic league appearances and goals

Konrad Kapler (25 February 1925 – 23 October 1991) was a Polish footballer who played as a winger.

He played for Celtic from 1947 to 1949. He had previously played for the Forres Mechanics and was scouted for the club whilst playing in an exhibition match for the Polish Army. The right sided midfielder found his first team opportunities limited and was released in 1949 after only 8 appearances; he then played for Rochdale, for whom he made four league appearances
