= Eric Barber (English footballer) =

English footballer (1926–2015)

Personal information
- Full name: Eric Barber
- Date of birth: 25 March 1926
- Place of birth: Stockport, England
- Date of death: 25 April 2015 (aged 89)
- Place of death: Hazel Grove, England
- Position: Winger

Senior career*
Years	Team	Apps	(Gls)
19??–1947	Stockport County	0	(0)
1947–1949	Sheffield United	0	(0)
1949	Stockport County	0	(0)
1949–1950	Macclesfield Town	29	(22)
1950–1951	Bolton Wanderers	0	(0)
1951–1952	Rochdale	17	(2)
1952–1955	Macclesfield Town	64	(22)
1955–195?	Witton Albion		
195?–19??	Stalybridge Celtic		
- * Club domestic league appearances and goals

Eric Barber (25 March 1926 – 25 April 2015) was an English footballer who played as a forward or winger in the Football League for Rochdale. He was on the books of Stockport County, Sheffield United and Bolton Wanderers without playing league football for any of them, and also played non-league football for Macclesfield Town (two spells), Witton Albion and Stalybridge Celtic.
