= Abe Rosenthal =

English footballer

Personal information
- Full name: Abram Wallace Rosenthal
- Date of birth: 12 October 1921
- Place of birth: Liverpool, England
- Date of death: February 1986 (aged 64)
- Place of death: Liverpool, England
- Position: Striker

Youth career
- Prescot Cables
- 1936–1939: Liverpool

Senior career*
Years	Team	Apps	(Gls)
1939–1947	Tranmere Rovers	27	(8)
1947–1949	Bradford City	44	(11)
1949	Oldham Athletic	0	(0)
1949–1952	Tranmere Rovers	69	(24)
1952–1954	Bradford City	63	(32)
1954–1955	Tranmere Rovers	21	(3)
1955–1956	Bradford City	1	(0)
Total		225	(78)
- * Club domestic league appearances and goals

Abram Wallace Rosenthal (12 October 1921 – February 1986), also known as Abraham Rosenthal, was an English professional footballer who played as a striker. Rosenthal was Jewish.

== Career ==
Born in Liverpool, Rosenthal was an amateur at Prescot Cables, and hometown club Liverpool, before turning professional in 1939 with Tranmere Rovers. Rosenthal spent three spells with Tranmere, and also spent three spells at Bradford City. Rosenthal made a total of 225 appearances in the Football League, scoring 78 goals. He also played for Oldham Athletic.

He died in February 1986, aged 64, having collapsed at his home in Woolton, Liverpool, after chasing two intruders from his house.
