= Len Small (footballer) =

English footballer

Personal information
- Full name: Martin Leonard Small
- Date of birth: 2 February 1920
- Place of birth: Gateshead, England
- Date of death: 11 October 2009 (aged 89)
- Position: Inside forward

Senior career*
Years	Team	Apps	(Gls)
1946–1952	Gateshead	94	(29)
- * Club domestic league appearances and goals

Len Small (2 February 1920 – 2009) was an English footballer who played as an inside forward.

Small played league football for Gateshead between 1946 and 1952, scoring a total of 33 goals in 98 games in the league and FA Cup.
