= Jimmy Whitehouse (footballer, born 1924) =

English footballer (1924–2005)

Personal information
- Full name: James Edward Whitehouse
- Date of birth: 19 September 1924
- Place of birth: West Bromwich, England
- Date of death: 2005 (aged 80–81)
- Position: Forward

Senior career*
Years	Team	Apps	(Gls)
1948–1949	West Bromwich Albion	0	(0)
1949–1950	Walsall	20	(8)
1950–1952	Rochdale	46	(13)
1952–1957	Carlisle United	198	(100)
Total		264	(121)
- * Club domestic league appearances and goals

James Whitehouse (19 September 1924 – 2005) was an English footballer who played in the Football League for Carlisle United, Rochdale, Walsall and West Bromwich Albion.
