= Bobby McIlvenny =

Northern Ireland footballer

Personal information
- Full name: Robert McIlvenny
- Date of birth: 7 July 1926
- Place of birth: Belfast, Northern Ireland
- Date of death: 15 May 2016 (aged 89)
- Place of death: Southport, Merseyside, England
- Position: Inside forward

Senior career*
Years	Team	Apps	(Gls)
- Merthyr Tydfil
1949–1954	Oldham Athletic	139	(36)
1954–1955	Bury	12	(1)
1955–1957	Southport	77	(16)
1957–1959	Barrow	43	(11)
- Yeovil Town
- Colwyn Bay
Total		271	(64)
- * Club domestic league appearances and goals

Robert McIlvenny (7 July 1926 – 15 May 2016), was a Northern Irish footballer who played as an inside forward in the Football League. He made 139 league appearances with Oldham Athletic where he scored 36 goals.

McIlvenny died on 15 May 2016 at Millbrook House in Southport at the age of 89.

McIlvenny's older brother Paddy also played in the Football League. Their father, also a Paddy McIlvenny, was an Ireland international footballer.
