= Norman Case (footballer) =

English footballer

Personal information
- Full name: Norman Case
- Date of birth: 1 September 1925
- Place of birth: Prescot, England
- Date of death: 1973 (aged 47–48)
- Place of death: Watford, England
- Position: Forward

Senior career*
Years	Team	Apps	(Gls)
1947–1948	Ards		
1948	Sheffield United	0	(0)
1948	Leyton Orient	0	(0)
1948–1949	Rochdale	0	(0)
1949–1950	Sunderland	4	(2)
1950	Watford	10	(4)
1951–1952	Yeovil Town		
1952	Rochdale	2	(0)
1952–1953	Cheltenham Town		
1953–195?	Canterbury City		
- * Club domestic league appearances and goals

Norman Case (1 September 1925 – 1973) was an English professional footballer who played as a forward for Sunderland.
