= Ian Winters =

Scottish footballer (1921–1994)

Personal information
- Full name: Ian Anderson Winters
- Date of birth: 8 February 1921
- Place of birth: Bridge of Weir, Scotland
- Date of death: 3 May 1994 (aged 73)
- Place of death: Kingston upon Hull, England
- Positions: Striker; inside forward

Senior career*
Years	Team	Apps	(Gls)
?–1945	New Earswick	?	(?)
1945–1948	York City	27	(10)
1948	Boston United	?	(?)
1948–1953	Gateshead	152	(49)
1953–1954	Workington	30	(3)
1954–?	Kettering Town	?	(?)
- * Club domestic league appearances and goals

Ian Anderson Winters (8 February 1921 – 3 May 1994) was a Scottish footballer.

Winters played for New Earswick, York City, Boston United, Gateshead, Workington & Kettering Town.
