= Alistair Buchan =

English footballer (1926–2004)

Personal information
- Full name: Alistair Reid Buchan
- Date of birth: 27 May 1926
- Place of birth: Aberdeen, Scotland
- Date of death: 25 May 2004 (aged 77)
- Place of death: Aberdeen, Scotland
- Position: Wing half

Senior career*
Years	Team	Apps	(Gls)
1949	Huntly		
1950–1951	Arbroath	5	(1)
1951–1954	Rochdale	107	(2)
Total		112	(3)
- * Club domestic league appearances and goals

Alistair Reid Buchan (27 May 1926 – 25 May 2004) was a Scottish footballer who played as a wing half for Huntly, Arbroath and Rochdale.

Buchan died in Aberdeen on 25 May 2004, at the age of 77.
