= Ken Walshaw =

English footballer

Personal information
- Date of birth: 28 August 1918
- Place of birth: Tynemouth, England
- Date of death: 1979 (aged 60–61)
- Position: Inside forward

Senior career*
Years	Team	Apps	(Gls)
- North Shields
1944–1947	Sunderland	0	(0)
1947–1948	Lincoln City	17	(6)
1948–1950	Carlisle United	50	(15)
1950–1951	Bradford City	9	(3)
- North Shields
Total		76	(24)
- * Club domestic league appearances and goals

Ken Walshaw (28 August 1918 – 1979) was an English professional footballer who played as an inside forward.

== Career ==
Born in Tynemouth, Walshaw played for North Shields, Sunderland, Lincoln City, Carlisle United and Bradford City.
