= Alan Steen =

English footballer

Personal information
- Date of birth: 1922
- Date of death: 26 August 2012 (aged 90)
- Position: Winger

Senior career*
Years	Team	Apps	(Gls)
1939–1946	Wolverhampton Wanderers		
1946–1947	Luton Town	10	(0)
1949–1950	Aldershot	9	(0)
1950–1951	Rochdale	45	(8)
1951–1952	Carlisle United	19	(2)
Total		83+	(10+)
- * Club domestic league appearances and goals

Alan Steen (1922 – 26 August 2012) was an English professional footballer who played as a winger, active between 1939 and 1952.

== Career ==
Steen made his debut for Wolverhampton Wanderers in the Football League as a 16 year old in March 1939, scoring a goal as Wolves beat Manchester United 3–0. Following the outbreak of World War II, Steen made 19 appearances for Wolves in the Midland Regional League, before joining the RAF; he was shot down in October 1943 and spent the rest of the War at the Stalag IV-B Prisoner of War camp. Upon the resumption of the League in 1946, Steen played for Luton Town, Aldershot, Rochdale and Carlisle United.
