= Ray Davies (footballer, born 1931) =

English footballer (1931–2019)

Personal information
- Date of birth: 3 October 1931
- Place of birth: Wallasey, England
- Date of death: March 2019 (aged 87)
- Place of death: Wirral, England
- Position: Winger

Senior career*
Years	Team	Apps	(Gls)
1951–1958	Tranmere Rovers	120	(8)
Total		120	(8)
- * Club domestic league appearances and goals

Ray Davies ( 3 October 1931 – March 2019) was an English footballer who played as a winger for Tranmere Rovers. Davies spent his entire playing career at the club, making 120 Football League appearances over seven seasons.
