= David Mycock (footballer, born 1921) =

English footballer

Personal information
- Full name: David Mycock
- Date of birth: 30 August 1921
- Place of birth: Sunderland, England
- Date of death: 7 October 1990 (aged 69)
- Position: Defender

Senior career*
Years	Team	Apps	(Gls)
1946–1952	Halifax Town	169	(17)
- Wigan Athletic
- * Club domestic league appearances and goals

David Mycock (30 August 1921 – 7 October 1990) was an English professional association football defender. Born in Sunderland, he joined Halifax Town in 1946, making 169 Football League appearances for the club before joining Wigan Athletic in 1952.

== Biography ==
Born in Sunderland, Mycock played amateur football prior to serving in the Army during the Second World War. After being demobilised in 1946, he signed as a professional with Halifax Town.

He died in October 1990, aged 69.
