= Jack Livesey (footballer) =

English footballer

Personal information
- Full name: John Livesey
- Date of birth: 8 March 1924
- Place of birth: Preston, England
- Date of death: 1988 (aged 63–64)
- Position: Forward

Senior career*
Years	Team	Apps	(Gls)
1945–1946	Preston North End	0	(0)
1946–1947	Bury	7	(1)
1947–1948	Doncaster Rovers	3	(0)
1948–1951	Rochdale	113	(36)
1951	Mossley	4	(0)
1951–1952	Southport	31	(9)
- Wigan Athletic
- Nelson
- * Club domestic league appearances and goals

John Livesey (8 March 1924 – 1988) was an English footballer who played as a forward.

Born in Preston, Livesey started his professional career in his hometown with Preston North End, but failed to make a first team appearance. He went on to play for Bury and Doncaster Rovers before signing for Rochdale in 1948, where he scored 36 goals in 113 League games. After a brief spell with Mossley, he returned to The Football League with Southport for one season. He then dropped into non-league football again to play for Wigan Athletic and Nelson.
