= Whelan Ward =

English footballer (1929–2021)

Personal information
- Full name: Lawrence Whelan Ward
- Date of birth: 15 June 1929
- Place of birth: Ovenden, England
- Date of death: February 2021 (aged 91)
- Height: 5 ft 3 in (1.60 m)
- Position: Striker

Youth career
- Huddersfield Town
- Ovenden

Senior career*
Years	Team	Apps	(Gls)
1948–1954	Bradford City	149	(37)
1954–1955	King's Lynn		
1955–1959	Bradford Park Avenue	108	(31)
- Nelson
Total		257	(68)
- * Club domestic league appearances and goals

Lawrence Whelan Ward (15 June 1929 – 7 February 2021) was an English professional footballer who played as a striker for both Bradford clubs.

== Career ==
Born in Ovenden, England, Whelan Ward was a diminutive striker, standing just 5 ft 3 in (1.60 m), who had unsuccessful trials with Bradford Park Avenue, Leeds United, Hull City and Halifax Town. He was signed by Bradford City manager David Steele, who had him on schoolboy forms at Huddersfield Town, from Ovenden in November 1948.

Ward made his City debut on Christmas Day 1948 against Oldham Athletic. He spent six seasons at Valley Parade scoring a total of 37 league goals and five FA Cup goals in 156 appearances. He was the club's top goal-scorer in 1951–52 and featured in the club's smallest attacking line-up against Darlington in October 1962.

He moved to King's Lynn in August 1954 but returned to Bradford the following year to sign for City's rivals Bradford Park Avenue. He spent four seasons with Park Avenue, returning to non-league football in August 1959 with Nelson.

Ward died in February 2021 at the age of 91.
