= Jack Connor (footballer, born 1919) =

English footballer

Personal information
- Full name: John Thomas Connor
- Date of birth: 21 December 1919
- Place of birth: Todmorden, England
- Date of death: 5 December 1998 (aged 78)
- Place of death: Stockport, England
- Position: Centre forward

Senior career*
| Years | Team | Apps | (Gls) |
- Albion Rovers
| 1944–1946 | Ipswich Town | 12 | (4) |
| 1946–1948 | Carlisle United | 40 | (12) |
| 1948 | Ards | | |
| 1948–1951 | Rochdale | 82 | (42) |
| 1951 | Bradford City | 14 | (7) |
| 1951–1956 | Stockport County | 206 | (132) |
| 1956–1957 | Crewe Alexandra | 27 | (4) |
| 1957–1958 | Runcorn | | |
| Total | | 381 | (201) |
- * Club domestic league appearances and goals

John Thomas Connor (21 December 1919 – 5 December 1998) was an English professional footballer who played as a centre forward.

== Career ==
Born in Todmorden, Connor played for Albion Rovers, Ipswich Town, Carlisle United, Ards, Rochdale, Bradford City, Stockport County, Crewe Alexandra and Runcorn.

He joined Ipswich Town in November 1944, and left in December 1946. For them he made 12 appearances in the Football League, scoring 4 goals; he also made one Cup appearance.

He joined Bradford City in April 1951, and left in October 1951. For them he made 14 appearances in the Football League, scoring 7 goals.

== Personal life ==
His son Jim and grandson Joe also played for Stockport County.

== Sources ==
- Frost, Terry (1988). Bradford City A Complete Record 1903-1988. Breedon Books Sport. ISBN 0-907969-38-0.
