= Ken Bower =

English footballer

Personal information
- Full name: Kenneth Bower
- Date of birth: 18 March 1926
- Place of birth: Huddersfield, England
- Date of death: August 2002 (aged 76)
- Place of death: Huddersfield, England
- Position: Centre forward

Senior career*
Years	Team	Apps	(Gls)
1946–1949	Darlington	75	(35)
1949–1950	Rotherham United	27	(10)
Total		102	(45)
- * Club domestic league appearances and goals

Kenneth Bower (18 March 1926 – August 2002) was an English footballer who scored 45 goals from 102 appearances in the Football League playing for Third Division North clubs Darlington and Rotherham United in the years following the Second World War. He played as a centre forward.
