= Trevor Churchill =

English footballer (1923–2020)

Personal information
- Date of birth: 20 November 1923
- Place of birth: Barnsley, England
- Date of death: April 2020 (aged 96)
- Place of death: Solihull, England
- Position: Goalkeeper

Senior career*
Years	Team	Apps	(Gls)
1939	Wath Wanderers		
1940	Loughborough College		
1945-1946	Sheffield United	0	(0)
1946	Corinthian-Casuals		
1946-1947	Reading	10	(0)
1947-1948	Leicester City	0	(0)
1949-1953	Rochdale	110	(0)
1953	Swindon Town	11	(0)
1954	Tonbridge		
Total		131	(0)
- * Club domestic league appearances and goals

Trevor Churchill (20 November 1923 – April 2020) was an English footballer who played as a goalkeeper for Reading, Rochdale, and Swindon Town. He was also on the reserve teams of Sheffield United and Leicester City. Churchill died in Solihull in April 2020, at the age of 96.

== Early life ==
He attended Barnsley Grammar School. He was the son of a policeman. He played in goal for his school team. He attended Loughborough teaching college.

== Career ==
In the 1950s he taught in Hemel Hempstead. In 1957 he trained the England schools team.
