= Bill Watson (footballer, born 1916) =

English footballer

Personal information
- Full name: William Watson
- Date of birth: 29 May 1916
- Place of birth: South Hiendley
- Date of death: 1986 (aged 69–70)
- Height: 5 ft 11 in (1.80 m)
- Position: Full back

Senior career*
| Years | Team | Apps | (Gls) |
| 1933 | Monckton Colliery Welfare | | |
| 1935–1936 | Lincoln City | 9 | (0) |
| 1946–1947 | Chesterfield | 36 | (0) |
| 1948–1954 | Rochdale | 200 | (0) |
| Total | | 245 | (0) |
- * Club domestic league appearances and goals

William Watson (29 May 1916 – 1986) was an English footballer who played as a full back for Lincoln City, Chesterfield and Rochdale.

He was the younger brother of Arthur Watson, who also played for Lincoln City and Chesterfield.
