= Alan Middlebrough =

English footballer

Personal information
- Date of birth: 4 December 1925
- Place of birth: Wardle, England
- Date of death: February 2004 (aged 78)
- Place of death: Keighley, England
- Position: Centre forward

Senior career*
Years	Team	Apps	(Gls)
- Morecambe
1946–1948	Bolton Wanderers	5	(1)
1948	Bradford City	4	(0)
1948–1952	Rochdale	47	(25)
Total		56	(26)
- * Club domestic league appearances and goals

Alan Middlebrough (4 December 1925 – February 2004) was an English professional footballer who played as a centre forward.

== Career ==
Born in Wardle, Middlebrough played for Morecambe, Bolton Wanderers, Bradford City and Rochdale.

== Sources ==
- Frost, Terry (1988). Bradford City A Complete Record 1903-1988. Breedon Books Sport. ISBN 0-907969-38-0.
