= Walter Birch (footballer) =

English footballer

Personal information
- Full name: James Walter Birch
- Date of birth: 5 October 1917
- Place of birth: Ecclesfield
- Date of death: 1991 (aged 73–74)
- Position: Central defender

Senior career*
Years	Team	Apps	(Gls)
1939	Huddersfield Town	0	(0)
1946-1953	Rochdale	243	(10)
Total		243	(10)
- * Club domestic league appearances and goals

James Walter Birch (5 October 1917 – 1991) was an English footballer who played as a central defender for Rochdale.

In May 1939 he signed professional forms with Huddersfield Town but never made a first team appearance, due to the outbreak of World War II.

During the war he played in the war-time league for Huddersfield Town, Mossley, Oldham Athletic, Leeds United and Rochdale.

In August 1946, he made his debut for Rochdale, and over seven seasons, he clocked up 243 league appearances and 10 goals, mostly from the penalty spot. He retired in 1953.

Birch died in 1991.
