= Don Partridge (footballer) =

English footballer

Personal information
- Full name: Donald Partridge
- Date of birth: 22 October 1925
- Place of birth: Bolton
- Date of death: 11 August 2003 (aged 77)
- Place of death: Blackpool, England
- Position: Wing half

Senior career*
Years	Team	Apps	(Gls)
1945	Farnworth		
1946-1956	Rochdale	103	(2)
Total		103	(2)
- * Club domestic league appearances and goals

Donald Partridge (22 October 1925 – 11 August 2003) was an English footballer who played as a wing half for Rochdale.

Partridge first played for Rochdale in the 1945-46 FA Cup, and made his league debut in the 1946-47 season. He remained at Rochdale throughout his career, clocking up 103 appearances and 2 goals. He retired in 1955.

Partridge died in 2003.
