= 1952–53 Rochdale A.F.C. season =

English football club season

Rochdale
1952–53 season
- Manager: Jack Warner
- Stadium: Spotland Stadium
- Division 3 North: 22nd
- F.A. Cup: 1st Round
- Top goalscorer: League: Bert Foulds; All: Bert Foulds

The 1952–53 season was Rochdale A.F.C.'s 46th in existence and their 25th in the Football League Third Division North.

== Squad statistics ==
=== Appearances and goals ===
No.	Pos	Nat	Player	Total		Division 3 North		F.A. Cup	
No.	Pos	Nat	Player	Apps	Goals	Apps	Goals	Apps	Goals
	GK	(England) ENG	Trevor Churchill	11	0	11	0	0	0
	DF	(England) ENG	Harry Potter	32	0	31	0	1	0
	DF	(Scotland) SCO	Harry Boyle	46	0	45	0	1	0
	MF	(Wales) WAL	Jack Warner	22	0	21	0	1	0
	DF	(England) ENG	Wally Birch	24	0	23	0	1	0
	MF	(Scotland) SCO	Alistair Buchan	40	1	40	1	0	0
	MF	(England) ENG	Jackie Arthur	15	4	15	4	0	0
	FW	(Scotland) SCO	Sandy Lister	2	0	2	0	0	0
	FW	(England) ENG	Bert Foulds	33	13	32	13	1	0
	FW	(Scotland) SCO	Bobby Gilfillan	42	10	41	10	1	0
	MF	(England) ENG	Eric Betts	27	4	26	4	1	0
	MF	(England) ENG	Harry Whitworth	40	7	39	7	1	0
	MF	(England) ENG	Joe Lynn	41	6	40	5	1	1
	GK	(England) ENG	Jim Nicholls	23	0	23	0	0	0
	FW	(Scotland) SCO	Les Murray	16	3	16	3	0	0
	GK	(England) ENG	Brian Sutton	11	0	11	0	0	0
	MF	(England) ENG	Charlie Hogan	3	0	3	0	0	0
	DF	(England) ENG	Eric Downes	4	0	4	0	0	0
	FW	(England) ENG	Ray Haddington	26	8	25	8	1	0
	DF	(England) ENG	Bill Watson	22	0	22	0	0	0
	GK	(England) ENG	Mark Radcliffe	2	0	1	0	1	0
	MF	(England) ENG	Billy Morris	4	1	4	1	0	0
	FW	(England) ENG	Stan Marriott	6	2	6	2	0	0
	MF	(England) ENG	Don Partridge	7	0	7	0	0	0
	FW	(England) ENG	John Graham	10	1	10	1	0	0
	MF	(England) ENG	Danny Boxshall	8	3	8	3	0	0

=== Appearances and goals (Non-competitive) ===
No.	Pos	Nat	Player	Total		Lancashire Cup	
No.	Pos	Nat	Player	Apps	Goals	Apps	Goals
	GK	(England) ENG	Trevor Churchill	0	0	0	0
	DF	(England) ENG	Harry Potter	1	0	1	0
	DF	(Scotland) SCO	Harry Boyle	1	0	1	0
	MF	(Wales) WAL	Jack Warner	0	0	0	0
	DF	(England) ENG	Wally Birch	0	0	0	0
	MF	(Scotland) SCO	Alistair Buchan	1	0	1	0
	MF	(England) ENG	Jackie Arthur	1	0	1	0
	FW	(Scotland) SCO	Sandy Lister	0	0	0	0
	FW	(England) ENG	Bert Foulds	1	0	1	0
	FW	(Scotland) SCO	Bobby Gilfillan	1	0	1	0
	MF	(England) ENG	Eric Betts	0	0	0	0
	MF	(England) ENG	Harry Whitworth	1	0	1	0
	MF	(England) ENG	Joe Lynn	1	0	1	0
	GK	(England) ENG	Jim Nicholls	1	0	1	0
	FW	(Scotland) SCO	Les Murray	0	0	0	0
	GK	(England) ENG	Brian Sutton	0	0	0	0
	MF	(England) ENG	Charlie Hogan	0	0	0	0
	DF	(England) ENG	Eric Downes	1	0	1	0
	FW	(England) ENG	Ray Haddington	1	0	1	0
	DF	(England) ENG	Bill Watson	0	0	0	0
	GK	(England) ENG	Mark Radcliffe	0	0	0	0
	MF	(England) ENG	Billy Morris	0	0	0	0
	FW	(England) ENG	Stan Marriott	0	0	0	0
	MF	(England) ENG	Don Partridge	0	0	0	0
	FW	(England) ENG	John Graham	0	0	0	0
	MF	(England) ENG	Danny Boxshall	0	0	0	0

== Final League Table ==
Pos	Team	Pld	W	D	L	GF	GA	GAv	Pts	Promotion or relegation
20	Chester	46	11	15	20	64	85	0.753	37	
21	Darlington	46	14	6	26	58	96	0.604	34	
22	Rochdale	46	14	5	27	62	83	0.747	33	
23	Workington	46	11	10	25	55	91	0.604	32	Re-elected
24	Accrington Stanley	46	8	11	27	39	89	0.438	27	Re-elected

Source: rsssf.com

== Competitions ==
=== Football League Third Division North ===
23 August 1952 1	Rochdale	0–1	Crewe Alexandra	Rochdale
		Report	McGuigan	Stadium: Spotland Stadium; Attendance: 7000; Referee: E Plinston

25 August 1952 2	Bradford Park Avenue	2–1	Rochdale	Bradford
	Turner; Horsman	Report	Whitworth	Stadium: Park Avenue; Attendance: 12060; Referee: A Holland

30 August 1952 3	Port Vale	5–2	Rochdale	Stoke-on-Trent
	Steele; Bennett; Griffiths; Mullard	Report	Gilfillan; Foulds	Stadium: Old Recreation Ground; Attendance: 15448; Referee: ER Hill

2 September 1952 4	Rochdale	1–0	Bradford Park Avenue	Rochdale
	Foulds	Report		Stadium: Spotland Stadium; Attendance: 6647; Referee: A Holland

6 September 1952 5	Rochdale	3–1	Chester	Rochdale
	Lynn; Gilfillan; Betts	Report	Richardson	Stadium: Spotland Stadium; Attendance: 6557; Referee: F Cowen

9 September 1952 6	Southport	1–0	Rochdale	Southport
	Pennington	Report		Stadium: Haig Avenue; Attendance: 5175; Referee: H Haworth

13 September 1952 7	Scunthorpe United	5–1	Rochdale	Scunthorpe
	Haigh; Whitfield; Mynard; McGill; Mosby	Report	Foulds	Stadium: Old Show Ground; Attendance: 7381; Referee: LN Peake

16 September 1952 8	Rochdale	0–0	Southport	Rochdale
		Report		Stadium: Spotland Stadium; Attendance: 5330

20 September 1952 9	Rochdale	2–2	Stockport County	Rochdale
	Lynn; Gilfillan	Report	Oliver; Connor	Stadium: Spotland Stadium; Attendance: 8623; Referee: JW Bowers

23 September 1952 10	Rochdale	2–0	Workington	Rochdale
	Murray; Betts	Report		Stadium: Spotland Stadium; Attendance: 5075; Referee: W Hesleton

27 September 1952 11	Bradford City	0–3	Rochdale	Bradford
		Report	Foulds	Stadium: Valley Parade; Attendance: 10898; Referee: A Murdoch

30 September 1952 12	Rochdale	2–3	Gateshead	Rochdale
	Gilfillan	Report	Wilbert; Winters; Price	Stadium: Spotland Stadium; Attendance: 4848

4 October 1952 13	Oldham Athletic	1–0	Rochdale	Oldham
	Crawford	Report		Stadium: Boundary Park; Attendance: 23026; Referee: J McCann

11 October 1952 14	Rochdale	4–1	Wrexham	Rochdale
	Whitworth; Murray; Arthur (pen.)	Report	Jones	Stadium: Spotland Stadium; Attendance: 8016; Referee: RJ Leafe

18 October 1952 15	Barrow	2–1	Rochdale	Barrow-in-Furness
	Gordon; Keen	Report	Gilfillan	Stadium: Holker Street; Attendance: 5789; Referee: J Bell

25 October 1952 16	Rochdale	0–2	Grimsby Town	Rochdale
		Report	McCue	Stadium: Spotland Stadium; Attendance: 12291

1 November 1952 17	York City	2–0	Rochdale	York
	Griffiths; Warrender	Report		Stadium: Bootham Crescent; Attendance: 9430; Referee: TW Glendenning

8 November 1952 18	Rochdale	3–0	Tranmere Rovers	Rochdale
	Gilfillan; Betts; Foulds	Report		Stadium: Spotland Stadium; Attendance: 6101; Referee: KA Collinge

15 November 1952 19	Chesterfield	1–0	Rochdale	Chesterfield
	Smith	Report		Stadium: Saltergate Recreation Ground; Attendance: 6752; Referee: L Richardson

29 November 1952 20	Accrington Stanley	2–1	Rochdale	Accrington
	Kendall; Bushell	Report	Gilfillan	Stadium: Peel Park; Attendance: 4060; Referee: H Beacock

6 December 1952 21	Chester	3–0	Rochdale	Chester
	Bullock; Travis; Kirkpatrick	Report		Stadium: Sealand Road; Attendance: 3324; Referee: F Cowen

13 December 1952 22	Mansfield Town	2–1	Rochdale	Mansfield
	Marron; Scott	Report	Marriott	Stadium: Field Mill; Attendance: 6211; Referee: C Fletcher

20 December 1952 23	Crewe Alexandra	4–2	Rochdale	Crewe
	Basford; Blunstone	Report	Whitworth; Haddington	Stadium: Gresty Road; Attendance: 4454; Referee: E Plinston

26 December 1952 24	Darlington	3–2	Rochdale	Darlington
	Murray	Report	Marriott; Lynn	Stadium: Feethams; Attendance: 6406; Referee: A Holland

27 December 1952 25	Rochdale	3–1	Darlington	Rochdale
	Haddington	Report	Murray	Stadium: Spotland Stadium; Attendance: 6461; Referee: A Holland

1 January 1953 26	Gateshead	3–1	Rochdale	Gateshead
	Callender (pen.); Price; Smith	Report	Foulds	Stadium: Redheugh Park; Attendance: 3729; Referee: L Howarth

3 January 1953 27	Rochdale	1–1	Port Vale	Rochdale
	Lynn (pen.)	Report	Hayward	Stadium: Spotland Stadium; Attendance: 6899; Referee: ER Hill

10 January 1953 28	Carlisle United	5–0	Rochdale	Carlisle
	Ashman; Whitehouse	Report		Stadium: Brunton Park; Attendance: 7282; Referee: W Hesleton

24 January 1953 29	Rochdale	2–2	Scunthorpe United	Rochdale
	Betts; Lynn	Report	Ottewell; Brownsword (pen.)	Stadium: Spotland Stadium; Attendance: 5050; Referee: LN Peake

31 January 1953 30	Rochdale	1–2	Carlisle United	Rochdale
	Haddington	Report	Ashman; Whitehouse	Stadium: Spotland Stadium; Attendance: 3447; Referee: W Hesleton

7 February 1953 31	Stockport County	2–0	Rochdale	Stockport
	Connor; Crosby	Report		Stadium: Edgeley Park; Attendance: 5659; Referee: JW Bowers

21 February 1953 32	Rochdale	3–1	Oldham Athletic	Rochdale
	Foulds; Buchan; Whitworth	Report	McIlvenny	Stadium: Spotland Stadium; Attendance: 15502; Referee: J McCann

28 February 1953 33	Wrexham	3–0	Rochdale	Wrexham
	Boyle (o.g.); Hughes; Tilston	Report		Stadium: Racecourse Ground; Attendance: 7879; Referee: RJ Leafe

7 March 1953 34	Rochdale	6–2	Barrow	Rochdale
	Whitworth; Morris; Foulds; Graham	Report	Collins; Gordon	Stadium: Spotland Stadium; Attendance: 5239; Referee: J Bell

14 March 1953 35	Grimsby Town	3–2	Rochdale	Cleethorpes
	Scotson; McCue	Report	Foulds	Stadium: Blundell Park; Attendance: 10578

21 March 1953 36	Rochdale	0–3	York City	Rochdale
		Report	Fenton; Hughes	Stadium: Spotland Stadium; Attendance: 6373; Referee: TW Glendenning

24 March 1953 37	Rochdale	2–1	Bradford City	Rochdale
	Foulds; Haddington	Report	Carr	Stadium: Spotland Stadium; Attendance: 2140

28 March 1953 38	Tranmere Rovers	1–0	Rochdale	Birkenhead
	Done	Report		Stadium: Prenton Park; Attendance: 4276; Referee: KA Collinge

3 April 1953 39	Hartlepools United	2–1	Rochdale	Hartlepool
	Harden; Newton	Report	Boxshall	Stadium: Victoria Park; Attendance: 8777; Referee: G Black

4 April 1953 40	Rochdale	0–2	Chesterfield	Rochdale
		Report	Wilson; Harvey	Stadium: Spotland Stadium; Attendance: 4803; Referee: L Richardson

6 April 1953 41	Rochdale	3–1	Hartlepools United	Rochdale
	Arthur (pen.); Boxshall; Murray	Report	Richardson	Stadium: Spotland Stadium; Attendance: 3378; Referee: G Black

11 April 1953 42	Workington	1–2	Rochdale	Workington
	Simmonds	Report	Arthur; Haddington	Stadium: Borough Park; Attendance: 3193; Referee: W Hesleton

14 April 1953 43	Rochdale	1–1	Halifax Town	Rochdale
	Gilfillan 3'	Report	Moss	Stadium: Spotland Stadium; Attendance: 3429

18 April 1953 44	Rochdale	1–0	Accrington Stanley	Rochdale
	Haddington	Report		Stadium: Spotland Stadium; Attendance: 4706; Referee: H Beacock

25 April 1953 45	Halifax Town	3–1	Rochdale	Halifax
	Frost; Watson (o.g.)	Report	Boxshall	Stadium: The Shay; Attendance: 4826; Referee: G Gibson

29 April 1953 46	Rochdale	1–0	Mansfield Town	Rochdale
	Gilfillan	Report		Stadium: Spotland Stadium; Attendance: 4282; Referee: C Fletcher

=== F.A. Cup ===
15 November 1952 1	Bradford Park Avenue	2–1	Rochdale	Bradford
	Lyons; Haines	Report	Lynn	Stadium: Park Avenue; Attendance: 13525; Referee: WHE Evans

=== Lancashire Cup ===
14 October 1952	Rochdale	0–1	Blackpool	Rochdale
			Goal	Stadium: Spotland Stadium; Attendance: 2205
