= List of Gateshead A.F.C. seasons =

Gateshead Association Football Club was a football club based in Gateshead, County Durham, England. The club was formed in South Shields in 1899 as South Shields Adelaide Athletic. After success in the North Eastern League prior to World War I, they were voted into the Football League in 1919. Financial problems in the late 1920s saw the club relocate to Gateshead in 1930, adopting the name of their new town. They remained in the Football League until 1960, when they were surprisingly voted out of the Football League and replaced by Peterborough United, despite not having had to apply for re-election since 1937. They subsequently played in regional leagues before folding in 1973. In order to replace them, another South Shields club was then moved to Gateshead, becoming Gateshead United.

== Seasons ==
Season	League									FA Cup	FA Trophy	Other Cups	Top scorer	
Season	Division	P	W	D	L	F	A	Pts	Pos	FA Cup	FA Trophy	Other Cups	Top scorer	
1930–31	Div 3N	42	16	13	13	71	73	45	9th	R3		DSP - W	Bill McNaughton	27
1931–32	Div 3N	40	25	7	8	94	48	57	2nd	R2			Bill McNaughton	22
1932–33	Div 3N	42	19	9	14	78	67	47	7th	R3			Jack Ranson	24
1933–34	Div 3N	42	12	9	21	76	110	33	19th	R3		D3NC - R1	Jack Wesley	27
1934–35	Div 3N	42	13	8	21	58	96	34	19th	R1		D3NC - R1	Jim Spedding	11
1935–36	Div 3N	42	13	14	15	56	76	40	14th	R1		D3NC - R2	Jack Allen	12
1936–37	Div 3N	42	11	10	21	63	98	32	21st	R2		D3NC - R1	Joe McDermott	13
1937–38	Div 3N	42	20	11	11	84	59	51	5th	R1		D3NC - R3	John Smith	26
1938–39	Div 3N	42	14	14	14	74	67	42	10th	R1		D3NC - R2	Hughie Gallacher	21
1939–40	Div 3N	3	1	0	2	6	7	2	N/A	N/A			Bob Birtley; John Callender; Peter Spooner	2
No competitive football was played between 1939 and 1946 due to World War II
1945–46										R3			Billy Cairns; Cec McCormack	5
1946–47	Div 3N	42	16	6	20	62	72	38	14th	R3			Cec McCormack	21
1947–48	Div 3N	42	19	11	12	75	57	49	4th	R1			Len Small	13
1948–49	Div 3N	42	16	13	13	69	58	45	5th	R4		DSP - W	George Wilbert	15
1949–50	Div 3N	42	23	7	12	87	54	53	2nd	R2			George Wilbert	18
1950–51	Div 3N	46	21	8	17	84	62	50	8th	R3		DSP - W	George Wilbert	18
1951–52	Div 3N	46	21	11	14	66	49	53	5th	R4			Ian Winters	19
1952–53	Div 3N	46	17	15	14	76	60	49	8th	QF			George Wilbert	16
1953–54	Div 3N	46	21	13	12	74	55	55	4th	R1			Ken Smith; Billy Watkin	12
1954–55	Div 3N	46	20	12	14	65	69	52	7th	R3		DSP - W	John Ingham	17
1955–56	Div 3N	46	17	11	18	77	84	45	13th	R1			John Ingham	14
1956–57	Div 3N	46	17	10	19	72	90	44	17th	R1			John Ingham	14
1957–58	Div 3N	46	15	15	16	68	76	45	14th	R1			Jack Hogg	14
1958–59	Div 4	46	16	8	22	56	85	40	20th	R1		DSP - W	Bob Baldridge	16
1959–60	Div 4	46	12	9	25	58	86	33	22nd	R1			Joe Armstrong	10
1960–61	NCOS	18	8	4	6	35	26	20	4th	R1			Alan Trewick	25
1961–62	NCOS	24	13	3	8	42	34	29	5th	R2			Alan Trewick	15
1962–63	NREG	32	10	9	13	60	55	29	11th	R2			Bennett Steele	22
1963–64	NREG	32	21	3	8	79	47	45	1st	R2			Frank McKenna	22
1964–65	NREG	32	17	7	8	80	43	41	4th	4Q			Frank McKenna	17
1965–66	NREG	32	10	6	16	48	67	26	10th	R2			Bennett Steele	15
1966–67	NREG	20	6	3	11	29	41	15	9th	4Q			Cyril Martin	14
1967–68	NREG	16	5	6	5	26	37	16	6th	1Q			J Cairns	12
1968–69	NPLP	38	14	9	15	42	48	37	11th	1Q			Gerry Coyne	20
1969–70	NPLP	38	5	12	21	37	94	22	20th	2Q	3Q		Arthur Lumsden	11
1970–71	WEAR	38	28	6	4	143	37	62	2nd	3Q	2Q		Len Smith	72
1971–72	MID	34	17	5	12	60	53	39	8th	3Q	1Q		Billy Lynn	17
1972–73	MID	34	14	6	14	72	68	34	9th	3Q	1Q		Billy Beat	19
Gateshead AFC folded in 1973. Gateshead Town replaced Gateshead AFC Reserves in the Northern Combination League

Champions	Runners-up	Promoted	Relegated

== Key ==
- P = Played
- W = Games won
- D = Games drawn
- L = Games lost
- F = Goals for
- A = Goals against
- Pts = Points
- Pos = Final position
- Div 3N = Football League Third Division North
- Div 4 = Football League Fourth Division
- NPLP = Northern Premier League Premier Division
- NCOS = Northern Counties League
- NREG = North Regional League
- MID = Midland League
- WEAR = Wearside Football League
- D3NC = Football League Third Division North Cup
- DSP = Durham Senior Professional Cup
- GR1 = First Group Stage
- GR2 = Second Group Stage
- PRE = Preliminary Round
- 1Q = First Qualifying Round
- 2Q = Second Qualifying Round
- 3Q = Third Qualifying Round
- 4Q = Fourth Qualifying Round
- R1 = Round 1
- R2 = Round 2
- R3 = Round 3
- R4 = Round 4
- QF = Quarter-finals
- SF = Semi-finals
- RU = Runners-up
- W = Winners
