= Gilliland =

Gilliland is a Scots surname. It is a variant of Gilfillan from the Gael, personal name Gille Fhaoldin meaning "servant of (St) Faolen". Variants include Gilfilland, Gillilan, Gellan(d), and Kilfillan.

Notable people with the surname include:

- Alexis A. Gilliland (born 1931), American science fiction writer and cartoonist
- Alison Gilliland (born 1968), Irish politician
- Allan Gilliland (born 1965), Canadian composer
- Anne J. Gilliland (born 1959), American archivist
- Ben Gilliland (born 1976), British writer
- Robert Gilliland Beckel (1948–2022), American political analyst
- Billy Gilliland (born 1957), Scottish badminton player
- Brett Gilliland (born 1981), American football coach
- Butch Gilliland (born 1958), American race car driver
- Charles L. Gilliland (1933–1951), American soldier, Medal of Honor recipient
- Chloe Gilliland (born 1990), Australian gymnast
- David Gilliland (born 1976), American race car driver
- Edwin R. Gilliland (1909–1973), American chemical engineer
- Eric Gilliland, American television producer and actor
- Ezra Gilliland (1845–1903), American inventor
- Gaelen Gilliland, American musical theater actress
- Hector Gilliland (1911–2002), Australian watercolor painter
- Helen Gilliland (1897–1942), Northern Irish actress and singer
- James Gilliland (1866–1952), British trade unionist
- John Gilliland (1935–1998), American radio broadcaster and documentarian
- Karen Gilliland (1977–2020), murdered Australian nurse and children's author
- Margaret Sylvia Gilliland (1917–1990), Australian biochemist
- Mark Gilliland, Canadian international lawn bowler
- Maybelle Gilliland (1906–1971), American track athlete
- Norman Gilliland (born 1949), producer on Wisconsin Public Radio
- Otho J. Gilliland (1892–1948), American football and basketball coach and school principal
- Richard Gilliland (1950–2021), American television and movie actor
- Thomas Gilliland (fl. 1804-1837), British journalist and theatre critic
- Todd Gilliland (born 2000), American stock car racing driver
- William Gilliland (1890–1961), Canadian politician

== See also ==
- Whelan
- McClellan

== See also ==
- Don Gililland (born 1939), commonly misspelled "Gilliland", American jazz guitarist and composer
- Gilliland's Ranch, an alleged UFO sighting location in Southwest Washington, United States
- Gilliland-Reese Covered Bridge, a covered bridge in Alabama, United States
- Mount Gilliland, in British Columbia, Canada
- USNS Gilliland, a US Navy vehicle cargo ship
