= Gilfillan =

Gilfillan is a Scottish surname. It derives from the Gael personal name Gille Fhaoldin meaning "servant of (St) Faolen". Variants include Gilfilland, Gillilan(d), Gellan(d), and Kilfillan.

Notable people with the name include:

- Andrew Gilfillan (born 1959), South African cricketer
- Bobby Gilfillan (footballer born 1926) (died 2018), Scottish professional footballer
- Bobby Gilfillan (footballer born 1938) (died 2012), Scottish professional footballer
- Bryan Gilfillan (born 1984), Scottish football manager and former player
- Calvin Willard Gilfillan (1832–1901), US Congressman
- Ceris Gilfillan (born 1980), British racing cyclist
- Charles Duncan Gilfillan (1831–1902), American lawyer, businessman, and politician
- Douglas Gilfillan (1865–1948), South African lawyer and plant collector
- Francis Gilfillan (1872–1933), Irish-American prelate
- Rev. George Gilfillan (1813–1878), Scottish poet and critic
- Gordon Gilfillan (1916–1982), Australian pastoralist and politician
- Hector Gilfillan (1903–1970), English footballer
- Ian Gilfillan (born 1932), Australian politician
- James Gilfillan (1836–1929), Treasurer of the United States
- James Gilfillan (judge) (1829–1894), American judge
- Jason Gilfillan (born 1976), American baseball player
- Jock Gilfillan (1898–1976), Scottish professional footballer
- John Alexander Gilfillan (1793–1864), British painter
- John Anderson Gilfillan (1821–1875), New Zealand politician
- John Bachop Gilfillan (1835–1924), US Congressman
- Rev. Joseph Alexander Gilfillan (1838–1913), Irish-American missionary
- Max D. Gilfillan (1894–1954), American college football coach and athletics administrator
- Merrill Gilfillan (born 1945), American poet
- Peter Gilfillan (born 1965), Canadian soccer player
- Robert Gilfillan (1798–1850), Scottish songwriter
- Ruth Gilfillan (born 1967), British swimmer

== Fictional characters ==
- Habakkuk Gilfillan, in Sir Walter Scott's Waverley.

== See also ==
- Gilfillan, Minnesota, a community in the United States
- Gilfillan Lake, a lake in Minnesota, United States
- Gilfillan Farm, a farm in Pennsylvania, United States
- Whelan
- McClellan
