= 2009–10 in English football =

Football in England
- Season: 2009–10

Men's football
- Premier League: Chelsea
- Championship: Newcastle United
- League One: Norwich City
- League Two: Notts County
- Conference National: Stevenage Borough
- FA Cup: Chelsea
- League Cup: Manchester United
- Community Shield: Chelsea

Women's football
- Premier League National Division: Arsenal
- Premier League Northern Division: Liverpool
- Premier League Southern Division: Barnet
- FA Women's Cup: Everton
- Premier League Cup: Leeds Carnegie

The 2009–2010 season was the 130th season of competitive football in England.

The 2009 season officially began on 8 August 2009 for the Championship, League One, League Two and the Premier League. The Championship season finished on 2 May 2010, with the Premier League, League One and League Two concluding on the weekend of 8–9 May.

== Promotion and relegation (pre-season) ==
Teams promoted to 2009–10 Premier League ▲

- Wolverhampton Wanderers ▲
- Birmingham City ▲
- Burnley ▲

Teams relegated from 2008–09 Premier League ▼

- Newcastle United ▼
- Middlesbrough ▼
- West Bromwich Albion ▼

Teams promoted to 2009–10 Football League Championship ▲

- Leicester City ▲
- Peterborough United ▲
- Scunthorpe United ▲

Teams relegated from 2008–09 Football League Championship ▼

- Norwich City ▼
- Southampton (started on −10 points for administration entrance) ▼
- Charlton Athletic ▼

Teams promoted to 2009–10 Football League One ▲

- Brentford ▲
- Exeter City ▲
- Wycombe Wanderers ▲
- Gillingham

Teams relegated from 2008–09 Football League One ▼

- Northampton Town ▼
- Crewe Alexandra ▼
- Cheltenham Town ▼
- Hereford United ▼

Teams promoted to 2009–10 Football League Two ▲

- Burton Albion ▲
- Torquay United ▲

Teams relegated from 2008–09 Football League Two ▼

- Chester City (started on −25 points and expelled from the Football Conference 10 March 2010) ▼
- Luton Town ▼

== Managerial changes ==
| Name | Club | Date of departure | Replacement | Date of appointment |
|---|---|---|---|---|
| Bryan Gunn | Norwich City | 14 August 2009 | Paul Lambert | 18 August 2009 |
| Paul Lambert | Colchester United | 18 August 2009 | Aidy Boothroyd | 2 September 2009 |
| Simon Davey | Barnsley | 29 August 2009 | Mark Robins | 9 September 2009 |
| Peter Jackson | Lincoln City | 2 September 2009 | Chris Sutton | 28 September 2009 |
| Stuart Gray | Northampton Town | 8 September 2009 | Ian Sampson^{1} | 5 October 2009 |
| Mark Robins | Rotherham United | 9 September 2009 | Ronnie Moore | 24 September 2009 |
| Colin Todd | Darlington | 26 September 2009 | Steve Staunton | 5 October 2009 |
| Guðjón Þórðarson | Crewe Alexandra | 2 October 2009 | Dario Gradi | 2 October 2009 |
| John Barnes | Tranmere Rovers | 9 October 2009 | Les Parry | 16 December 2009 |
| Peter Taylor | Wycombe Wanderers | 9 October 2009 | Gary Waddock | 13 October 2009 |
| Ian McParland | Notts County | 12 October 2009 | Hans Backe | 27 October 2009 |
| Gary Waddock | Aldershot Town | 13 October 2009 | Kevin Dillon | 9 November 2009 |
| Mike Newell | Grimsby Town | 18 October 2009 | Neil Woods | 23 November 2009 |
| Gareth Southgate | Middlesbrough | 21 October 2009 | Gordon Strachan | 26 October 2009 |
| Russell Slade | Brighton & Hove Albion | 1 November 2009 | Gustavo Poyet | 10 November 2009 |
| Darren Ferguson | Peterborough United | 9 November 2009 | Mark Cooper | 14 November 2009 |
| Paul Hart | Portsmouth | 24 November 2009 | Avram Grant | 26 November 2009 |
| Paul Sturrock | Plymouth Argyle | 10 December 2009 | Paul Mariner | 10 December 2009 |
| Martin Allen | Cheltenham Town | 11 December 2009 | Mark Yates | 22 December 2009 |
| Brian Laws | Sheffield Wednesday | 13 December 2009 | Alan Irvine | 8 January 2010 |
| Hans Backe | Notts County | 15 December 2009 | Steve Cotterill | 23 February 2010 |
| Jim Magilton | Queens Park Rangers | 16 December 2009 | Paul Hart | 17 December 2009 |
| Brendan Rodgers | Reading | 17 December 2009 | Brian McDermott^{2} | 27 January 2010 |
| Mark Hughes | Manchester City | 19 December 2009 | Roberto Mancini | 21 December 2009 |
| Alan Irvine | Preston North End | 29 December 2009 | Darren Ferguson | 6 January 2010 |
| Gary Megson | Bolton Wanderers | 30 December 2009 | Owen Coyle | 8 January 2010 |
| Owen Coyle | Burnley | 8 January 2010 | Brian Laws | 13 January 2010 |
| Paul Hart | Queens Park Rangers | 15 January 2010 | Neil Warnock | 1 March 2010 |
| Mark Cooper | Peterborough United | 1 February 2010 | Jim Gannon | 2 February 2010 |
| Stuart McCall | Bradford City | 8 February 2010 | Peter Taylor | 17 February 2010 |
| Neil Warnock | Crystal Palace | 1 March 2010 | Paul Hart | 2 March 2010 |
| Keith Alexander | Macclesfield Town | 3 March 2010 | Gary Simpson^{3} | 14 April 2010 |
| John Trewick | Hereford United | 8 March 2010 | Graham Turner | 8 March 2010 |
| Phil Brown | Hull City | 15 March 2010 | Iain Dowie | 17 March 2010 |
| Gary Johnson | Bristol City | 18 March 2010 | Steve Coppell^{4} | 19 April 2010 |
| Steve Staunton | Darlington | 21 March 2010 | Simon Davey | 1 April 2010 |
| Geraint Williams | Leyton Orient | 3 April 2010 | Russell Slade | 5 April 2010 |
| Jim Gannon | Peterborough United | 6 April 2010 | Gary Johnson | 6 April 2010 |
| Ian Hendon | Barnet | 28 April 2010 | Mark Stimson | 1 June 2010 |
| Paul Simpson | Shrewsbury Town | 30 April 2010 | Graham Turner | 11 June 2010 |
| Chris Coleman | Coventry City | 4 May 2010 | Aidy Boothroyd | 20 May 2010 |
| Dave Penney | Oldham Athletic | 6 May 2010 | Paul Dickov | 9 June 2010 |
| Paul Mariner | Plymouth Argyle | 6 May 2010 | Peter Reid | 24 June 2010 |
| Mark Stimson | Gillingham | 10 May 2010 | Andy Hessenthaler | 21 May 2010 |
| Paul Ince | Milton Keynes Dons | 10 May 2010 | Karl Robinson | 10 May 2010 |
| Gianfranco Zola | West Ham United | 11 May 2010 | Avram Grant | 3 June 2010 |
| Aidy Boothroyd | Colchester United | 20 May 2010 | John Ward | 31 May 2010 |
| Avram Grant | Portsmouth | 31 May 2010 | Steve Cotterill | 17 June 2010 |
| Steve Cotterill | Notts County | 27 May 2010 | Craig Short | 4 June 2010 |
| Rafael Benítez | Liverpool | 3 June 2010 | Roy Hodgson | 1 July 2010 |

Notes

- ^{1} Sampson was named caretaker manager following Gray's departure on 8 September and appointed full-time on 5 October.
- ^{2} McDermott was named caretaker manager following Rogers' departure on 17 December and was appointed full-time on 27 January.
- ^{3} Simpson was named caretaker manager on 3 March and appointed full-time on 14 April.
- ^{4} Keith Millen remained caretaker manager until the end of the season when Coppell took charge.

== Retirements ==
8 October 2009: Stephen Roberts, 29-year-old former Wrexham, Doncaster Rovers and Walsall defender.

22 October 2009: Marc Edworthy, 36-year-old right-back who last played for Burton Albion retired after playing over 500 senior appearances in 18-year career. He played for eight clubs in his career which included spells in the Premier League with Crystal Palace, Coventry City, Norwich City and Derby County.

8 December 2009: Linvoy Primus, 36-year-old Portsmouth defender, after failing to overcome a serious knee injury but now work ambassadorial role for Portsmouth. He previously played for Charlton Athletic, Barnet and Reading.

11 December 2009: Dean Ashton, 26-year-old West Ham United striker, after failing to make a full recovery from an ankle injury suffered when training with the England team in August 2006.

17 December 2009: Riccardo Scimeca, 34-year-old Cardiff City midfielder formerly of Aston Villa, Leicester City and Nottingham Forest.

6 January 2010: Neil Clement, 31-year-old West Bromwich Albion defender and club's longest serving player after 10 years there, after failing to make a full recovery from a knee injury suffered in August 2008.

6 January 2010: Patrik Berger, 36-year-old Czech midfielder who had spells in England with Liverpool, Portsmouth and Aston Villa before returning to Sparta Prague.

== Notable debutants ==
- 24 October 2009 – Jeffrey Bruma, 17-year-old defender, made his debut for Chelsea as a substitute (coming on for Ricardo Carvalho) in a 5-0 Premier League home win against Blackburn Rovers.
- 2 March 2010 – Alex Oxlade-Chamberlain, 16-year-old winger, made his debut for Southampton as a late substitute in a 5–0 home win over Huddersfield Town in League One.
- 21 March 2010 – Phil Jones, 18-year-old defender, made his debut for Blackburn Rovers in their 1–1 home Premier League draw to Chelsea.
- 9 May 2010 – Jack Robinson, 16-year-old defender, made his debut for Liverpool in a 0–0 away Premier League draw with Hull. At the time, this made Robinson Liverpool's youngest-ever first-team player, a record since broken by Jerome Sinclair (all competitions) and Harvey Elliott (Premier League only.)

== National team ==
The home team is on the left column; the away team is on the right column.

=== Friendly matches ===
12 August 2009

| Netherlands | 2–2 | England |
|---|---|---|
| Kuyt 10'; Van der Vaart 38' | (Report) | Defoe 49', 77' |

Amsterdam Arena, Amsterdam
Attendance: 50,000
Referee: Nicola Rizzoli (Italy)

5 September 2009

| England | 2–1 | Slovenia |
|---|---|---|
| Lampard 31' (pen.); Defoe 63' | (Report) | Ljubijankič 85' |

Wembley Stadium, London
Attendance: 67,232
Referee: Jonas Eriksson (Sweden)

14 November 2009

| England | 0–1 | Brazil |
|---|---|---|
| | (Report) | Nilmar 48' |

Khalifa International Stadium, Doha
Attendance: 50,000
Referee: Abdou Abdulrahman (Qatar)

3 March 2010

| England | 3–1 | Egypt |
|---|---|---|
| Crouch 56', 80'; Wright-Phillips 75' | (Report) | Zidan 23' |

Wembley Stadium, London
Attendance: 80,602

24 May 2010

| England | 3–1 | Mexico |
|---|---|---|
| King 17'; Crouch 35'; Johnson 47' | (Report) | Franco 45' |

Wembley Stadium, London
Attendance: 88,638

30 May 2010

| Japan | 1–2 | England |
|---|---|---|
| Tulio 7' | (Report) | Tulio 72' (o.g.); Nakazawa 83' (o.g.) |

UPC-Arena, Graz
Attendance: 15,326
Referee: Rene Eisner (Austria)

=== World Cup qualifiers ===
England were in Group 6 of the 2010 FIFA World Cup qualification process.

9 September 2009

| England | 5–1 | Croatia |
|---|---|---|
| Lampard 7' (pen.), 59'; Gerrard 18', 66'; Rooney 77' | (Report) | Eduardo 72' |

Wembley Stadium, London
Attendance: 87,319
Referee: Alberto Undiano Mallenco (Spain)

10 October 2009

| Ukraine | 1–0 | England |
|---|---|---|
| Nazarenko 27' | (Report) |

Dnipro Stadium, Dnipropetrovsk
Attendance: 40,000
Referee: Damir Skomina (Slovenia)

14 October 2009

| England | 3–0 | Belarus |
|---|---|---|
| Crouch 4', 76'; Wright-Phillips 59' | (Report) |

Wembley Stadium, London
Attendance: 76,897
Referee: Lucílio Batista (Portugal)

== Honours ==
=== Trophy and league champions ===
| Competition | Winner | Details | At | Match Report |
|---|---|---|---|---|
| FA Cup | Chelsea | 2009–10 FA Cup beat Portsmouth 1–0 | Wembley | Report |
| League Cup | Manchester United | 2009–10 Football League Cup beat Aston Villa 2–1 | Wembley | Report |
| Premier League | Chelsea | 2009–10 Premier League | Stamford Bridge | Report |
| Championship | Newcastle United | 2009–10 Football League Championship | Home Park | Report |
| League One | Norwich City | 2009–10 Football League One | Carrow Road | Report |
| League Two | Notts County | 2009–10 Football League Two | The Darlington Arena | Report |
| FA Community Shield | Chelsea | 2009 FA Community Shield beat Manchester United 4–1 on penalties (2–2 final score) | Wembley | Report |
| Football League Trophy | Southampton | 2009–10 Football League Trophy beat Carlisle United 4–1 | Wembley | Report |
| FA Trophy | Barrow | 2009–10 FA Trophy beat Stevenage Borough 2–1 | Wembley | Report |

=== Playoff winners ===
| Competition | Winner | Details |
|---|---|---|
| Football League Championship | Blackpool | 2009–10 Football League Championship; Beat Cardiff 3–2 |
| Football League One | Millwall | 2009–10 Football League One; Beat Swindon Town 1–0 |
| Football League Two | Dagenham & Redbridge | 2009–10 Football League Two; Beat Rotherham 3–2 |
| Conference National | Oxford United | 2009–10 Conference National; Beat York 3–1 |
| Conference North | Fleetwood Town | 2009–10 Conference North; Beat Alfreton 2–1 |
| Conference South | Bath City | 2009–10 Conference South; Beat Woking 1–0 |

== League tables ==
=== Premier League ===
In one of the most closely fought title races in recent history, Chelsea were crowned Premier League Champions for the second time in five years, breaking the goal-scoring record with 103 goals. Despite the disappointment in the Champions League, the club managed to retain the FA Cup, recording their first domestic double under Carlo Ancelotti. The £80 million departure of Cristiano Ronaldo to Real Madrid in the summer meant Manchester United narrowly missed out on the title, though they managed to retain the League Cup. Arsenal took third place and once again qualified for Europe's elite competition, while Tottenham Hotspur took the final spot for the Champions League by finishing fourth, with the manager Harry Redknapp winning the Premier League Manager of the Year award.

Three teams took the UEFA Europa League spots. Taking fifth place were Manchester City, whose controversial gamble of sacking Mark Hughes at Christmas and replacing him with Roberto Mancini paid off as they finished in their best position in years. Finishing sixth once again were Aston Villa, who again looked like breaking into the top four, but ultimately fell short. Taking seventh place were Liverpool, who were runners-up the year before, but suffered from losing key players, such as Xabi Alonso to Real Madrid, Sami Hyypiä to Bayer Leverkusen and Fernando Torres several times to injury throughout the season; these factors resulted in indifferent form in all of their competitions, meaning they only took a Europa League spot after the FA Cup finalists were refused a UEFA licence and finished in their lowest position for eleven years.

Fulham built on last season's finish of seventh place as they came close to Europa League glory in Hamburg, losing 2–1 in extra time to Atlético Madrid with ex-Manchester United striker Diego Forlán scoring the winning goal. However, critics universally praised manager Roy Hodgson for guiding a club threatened with relegation two seasons previously to the Europa League final. By a wide margin, he won the LMA Manager of the Year award. Birmingham City finished ninth in their best position in the top flight in years, with their season including a twelve match unbeaten run, while fellow promoted side Wolverhampton Wanderers flirted with relegation several times, but ultimately finished in a respectable 15th place.

On 26 February 2010, Portsmouth became the first Premier League club to enter administration. Portsmouth endured a season of financial worries, a nine-point deduction and four different owners that effectively ended their seven-year stay in the top flight. Hull City failed to emulate their previous season's success and were also relegated. After the departure of promotion-winning manager Owen Coyle at the turn of the year, Burnley's league form under Brian Laws declined rapidly and they were relegated to the Championship after just one season.

==== Table ====
| Pos | Team | Pld | W | D | L | GF | GA | GD | Pts | Qualification or relegation |
|---|---|---|---|---|---|---|---|---|---|---|
| 1 | Chelsea (C) | 38 | 27 | 5 | 6 | 103 | 32 | +71 | 86 | Qualification for the Champions League group stage |
| 2 | Manchester United | 38 | 27 | 4 | 7 | 86 | 28 | +58 | 85 | Qualification for the Champions League group stage |
| 3 | Arsenal | 38 | 23 | 6 | 9 | 83 | 41 | +42 | 75 | Qualification for the Champions League group stage |
| 4 | Tottenham Hotspur | 38 | 21 | 7 | 10 | 67 | 41 | +26 | 70 | Qualification for the Champions League play-off round |
| 5 | Manchester City | 38 | 18 | 13 | 7 | 73 | 45 | +28 | 67 | Qualification for the Europa League play-off round (Note: Since Manchester United won the League Cup and then qualified for the Champions League, their spot in the Europa League was passed down to the 6th-placed team. The 6th-placed Aston Villa was coincidentally also the League Cup runners-up.) |
| 6 | Aston Villa | 38 | 17 | 13 | 8 | 52 | 39 | +13 | 64 | Qualification for the Europa League play-off round |
| 7 | Liverpool | 38 | 18 | 9 | 11 | 61 | 35 | +26 | 63 | Qualification for the Europa League third qualifying round (Note: Originally Portsmouth qualified for the third qualifying round of the Europa League as the FA Cup runners-up, replacing the winners, Champions League-qualified Chelsea. However, they failed to apply for a UEFA licence. Therefore, Liverpool as the best placed team not qualified for the European competitions took their place.) |
| 8 | Everton | 38 | 16 | 13 | 9 | 60 | 49 | +11 | 61 | |
| 9 | Birmingham City | 38 | 13 | 11 | 14 | 38 | 47 | −9 | 50 | |
| 10 | Blackburn Rovers | 38 | 13 | 11 | 14 | 41 | 55 | −14 | 50 | |
| 11 | Stoke City | 38 | 11 | 14 | 13 | 34 | 48 | −14 | 47 | |
| 12 | Fulham | 38 | 12 | 10 | 16 | 39 | 46 | −7 | 46 | |
| 13 | Sunderland | 38 | 11 | 11 | 16 | 48 | 56 | −8 | 44 | |
| 14 | Bolton Wanderers | 38 | 10 | 9 | 19 | 42 | 67 | −25 | 39 | |
| 15 | Wolverhampton Wanderers | 38 | 9 | 11 | 18 | 32 | 56 | −24 | 38 | |
| 16 | Wigan Athletic | 38 | 9 | 9 | 20 | 37 | 79 | −42 | 36 | |
| 17 | West Ham United | 38 | 8 | 11 | 19 | 47 | 66 | −19 | 35 | |
| 18 | Burnley (R) | 38 | 8 | 6 | 24 | 42 | 82 | −40 | 30 | Relegation to Football League Championship |
| 19 | Hull City (R) | 38 | 6 | 12 | 20 | 34 | 75 | −41 | 30 | Relegation to Football League Championship |
| 20 | Portsmouth (R) | 38 | 7 | 7 | 24 | 34 | 66 | −32 | 19 (Note: Portsmouth were docked nine points for entering administration.) | Relegation to Football League Championship |

Source: Barclays Premier League
(C) Champions; (R) Relegated
Notes:

Leading goalscorer: Didier Drogba (Chelsea) – 29

=== Football League Championship ===
Newcastle United put last season's relegation behind them as they returned to the Premier League at the first attempt, staying top for the majority of the season and losing just four matches under the management of Chris Hughton, remaining unbeaten at home in the process. Roberto Di Matteo's first season in charge of West Bromwich Albion brought success as the Midlands club enjoyed automatic promotion to the top flight for the third time in eight years. They were joined by Blackpool, who were tipped by many as relegation favourites at the beginning of the season. Ian Holloway masterminded the Lancashire club's promotion with a thrilling 3–2 victory over Cardiff City in the play-off final, returning to the top flight for the first time since 1971.

Swansea City occupied a play-off place for most of the season but missed out on the final day, this despite scoring fewer goals than all three relegated sides. Middlesbrough made a strong start to the season, however the mid-season decision to sack Gareth Southgate while still in contention for promotion backfired. Their form subsequently declined under his replacement Gordon Strachan, and they fell out of the promotion race and finished in 11th place.

Peterborough United went straight back down to League One, employing four different managers and propping up the table for the majority of the season. They were soon joined by Plymouth Argyle, who did not win a game until late September and went on a five-match losing streak towards the end of the season, ending six years in the second tier. Crystal Palace, who had been on the brink of the playoffs before being deducted ten points for entering administration, faced Sheffield Wednesday in the final match of the season as they both fought for survival. The match finished 2–2, meaning Palace survived and Wednesday dropped into League One.

| Pos | Team | Pld | W | D | L | GF | GA | GD | Pts | Promotion, qualification or relegation |
|---|---|---|---|---|---|---|---|---|---|---|
| 1 | Newcastle United (C, P) | 46 | 30 | 12 | 4 | 90 | 35 | +55 | 102 | Promotion to the Premier League |
| 2 | West Bromwich Albion (P) | 46 | 26 | 13 | 7 | 89 | 48 | +41 | 91 | Promotion to the Premier League |
| 3 | Nottingham Forest | 46 | 22 | 13 | 11 | 65 | 40 | +25 | 79 | Qualification for Championship play-offs |
| 4 | Cardiff City | 46 | 22 | 10 | 14 | 73 | 54 | +19 | 76 | Qualification for Championship play-offs |
| 5 | Leicester City | 46 | 21 | 13 | 12 | 61 | 45 | +16 | 76 | Qualification for Championship play-offs |
| 6 | Blackpool (O, P) | 46 | 19 | 13 | 14 | 74 | 58 | +16 | 70 | Qualification for Championship play-offs |
| 7 | Swansea City | 46 | 17 | 18 | 11 | 40 | 37 | +3 | 69 | |
| 8 | Sheffield United | 46 | 17 | 14 | 15 | 62 | 55 | +7 | 65 | |
| 9 | Reading | 46 | 17 | 12 | 17 | 68 | 63 | +5 | 63 | |
| 10 | Bristol City | 46 | 15 | 18 | 13 | 56 | 65 | −9 | 63 | |
| 11 | Middlesbrough | 46 | 16 | 14 | 16 | 58 | 50 | +8 | 62 | |
| 12 | Doncaster Rovers | 46 | 15 | 15 | 16 | 59 | 58 | +1 | 60 | |
| 13 | Queens Park Rangers | 46 | 14 | 15 | 17 | 58 | 65 | −7 | 57 | |
| 14 | Derby County | 46 | 15 | 11 | 20 | 53 | 63 | −10 | 56 | |
| 15 | Ipswich Town | 46 | 12 | 20 | 14 | 50 | 61 | −11 | 56 | |
| 16 | Watford | 46 | 14 | 12 | 20 | 61 | 68 | −7 | 54 | |
| 17 | Preston North End | 46 | 13 | 15 | 18 | 58 | 73 | −15 | 54 | |
| 18 | Barnsley | 46 | 14 | 12 | 20 | 53 | 69 | −16 | 54 | |
| 19 | Coventry City | 46 | 13 | 15 | 18 | 47 | 64 | −17 | 54 | |
| 20 | Scunthorpe United | 46 | 14 | 10 | 22 | 62 | 84 | −22 | 52 | |
| 21 | Crystal Palace | 46 | 14 | 17 | 15 | 50 | 53 | −3 | 49 (Note: Crystal Palace were given a ten-point deduction for entering administration.) | |
| 22 | Sheffield Wednesday (R) | 46 | 11 | 14 | 21 | 49 | 69 | −20 | 47 | Relegation to Football League One |
| 23 | Plymouth Argyle (R) | 46 | 11 | 8 | 27 | 43 | 68 | −25 | 41 | Relegation to Football League One |
| 24 | Peterborough United (R) | 46 | 8 | 10 | 28 | 46 | 80 | −34 | 34 | Relegation to Football League One |

Source: The Football League
Rules for classification: 1) points; 2) goal difference; 3) number of goals scored.
(C) Champions; (O) Play-off winners; (P) Promoted; (R) Relegated
Notes:

Leading goalscorers: Nicky Maynard (Bristol City) – 20, and Peter Whittingham (Cardiff City) – 20

=== Football League One ===
After recovering from an embarrassing 7–1 defeat to Colchester on the first day of the season, a turnaround under new manager Paul Lambert and the 24 goals from free-scoring striker Grant Holt saw Norwich City make an immediate return to the Championship. Leeds United secured automatic promotion in the runners-up spot; their season almost fell apart disastrously after they led the table by eight points at the turn of the year and also knocked Manchester United out of the FA Cup. They rebounded in the final weeks of the season and a last day 2–1 victory over Bristol Rovers saw the Yorkshire side end their three-year spell in League One. Millwall, who narrowly missed out on automatic promotion by just one point, beat Swindon Town in the play-off final, returning to the Championship after a four-year absence. Despite being deducted ten points and missing out on the play-offs, Southampton managed to win the Football League Trophy and striker Rickie Lambert was the league's top scorer with 31 goals.

Stockport County spent the entire season in administration and were subsequently relegated. Southend United were faced with financial problems and also relegated. Wycombe Wanderers' first season at this level for six years proved a disappointment, and they were immediately relegated back to League Two. Gillingham also suffered an immediate relegation after their play-off victory the previous year, their inability to win an away fixture all season proved to be their downfall. Hartlepool stayed up on goal difference after they received a three-point deduction for fielding an ineligible player, but Gillingham's loss to Wycombe confirmed their survival.

| Pos | Team | Pld | W | D | L | GF | GA | GD | Pts | Promotion, qualification or relegation |
|---|---|---|---|---|---|---|---|---|---|---|
| 1 | Norwich City (C, P) | 46 | 29 | 8 | 9 | 89 | 47 | +42 | 95 | Promotion to Football League Championship |
| 2 | Leeds United (P) | 46 | 25 | 11 | 10 | 77 | 44 | +33 | 86 | Promotion to Football League Championship |
| 3 | Millwall (O, P) | 46 | 24 | 13 | 9 | 76 | 44 | +32 | 85 | Qualification for League One play-offs |
| 4 | Charlton Athletic | 46 | 23 | 15 | 8 | 71 | 48 | +23 | 84 | Qualification for League One play-offs |
| 5 | Swindon Town | 46 | 22 | 16 | 8 | 73 | 57 | +16 | 82 | Qualification for League One play-offs |
| 6 | Huddersfield Town | 46 | 23 | 11 | 12 | 82 | 56 | +26 | 80 | Qualification for League One play-offs |
| 7 | Southampton | 46 | 23 | 14 | 9 | 85 | 47 | +38 | 73 (Note: Southampton were given a ten-point deduction for breaching insolvency regulations, regarding their holding company. As they finished in the bottom three of the Championship last season, the points deduction were applied in the 2009–10 season.) | |
| 8 | Colchester United | 46 | 20 | 12 | 14 | 64 | 52 | +12 | 72 | |
| 9 | Brentford | 46 | 14 | 20 | 12 | 55 | 52 | +3 | 62 | |
| 10 | Walsall | 46 | 16 | 14 | 16 | 60 | 63 | −3 | 62 | |
| 11 | Bristol Rovers | 46 | 19 | 5 | 22 | 59 | 70 | −11 | 62 | |
| 12 | Milton Keynes Dons | 46 | 17 | 9 | 20 | 60 | 68 | −8 | 60 | |
| 13 | Brighton & Hove Albion | 46 | 15 | 14 | 17 | 56 | 60 | −4 | 59 | |
| 14 | Carlisle United | 46 | 15 | 13 | 18 | 63 | 66 | −3 | 58 | |
| 15 | Yeovil Town | 46 | 13 | 14 | 19 | 55 | 59 | −4 | 53 | |
| 16 | Oldham Athletic | 46 | 13 | 13 | 20 | 39 | 57 | −18 | 52 | |
| 17 | Leyton Orient | 46 | 13 | 12 | 21 | 53 | 63 | −10 | 51 | |
| 18 | Exeter City | 46 | 11 | 18 | 17 | 48 | 60 | −12 | 51 | |
| 19 | Tranmere Rovers | 46 | 14 | 9 | 23 | 45 | 72 | −27 | 51 | |
| 20 | Hartlepool United | 46 | 14 | 11 | 21 | 59 | 67 | −8 | 50 (Note: Hartlepool were deducted 3 points for fielding an ineligible player.) | |
| 21 | Gillingham (R) | 46 | 12 | 14 | 20 | 48 | 64 | −16 | 50 | Relegation to Football League Two |
| 22 | Wycombe Wanderers (R) | 46 | 10 | 15 | 21 | 56 | 76 | −20 | 45 | Relegation to Football League Two |
| 23 | Southend United (R) | 46 | 10 | 13 | 23 | 51 | 72 | −21 | 43 | Relegation to Football League Two |
| 24 | Stockport County (R) | 46 | 5 | 10 | 31 | 35 | 95 | −60 | 25 | Relegation to Football League Two |

Source: The Football League
Rules for classification: 1) points; 2) goal difference; 3) number of goals scored.
(C) Champions; (O) Play-off winners; (P) Promoted; (R) Relegated
Notes:

Leading goalscorer: Rickie Lambert (Southampton) – 31

=== Football League Two ===
Notts County's season mostly made the headlines for all the wrong reasons, as they were involved in an abortive high-spending takeover by a consortium who brought in Sven-Göran Eriksson as director of football and went through four managers during the season. However, they managed to overcome their off-field problems and won the title. AFC Bournemouth continued their revival under Eddie Howe and won promotion in the runners-up spot. The last automatic promotion spot was taken by Rochdale, who were promoted for the first time since 1969. Dagenham & Redbridge won the play-offs, reaching the third tier of the Football League for the first time in their 18-year history.

Darlington were unable to recover from losing many of their players during their spell in administration at the end of the previous season and finished bottom of the league, becoming the third club (after Halifax Town and Chester City) to be relegated to the Football Conference on two separate occasions. Grimsby suffered the relegation that they only avoided the previous year due to Luton Town's points deduction; their form improved significantly in the final weeks of the season, but they were ultimately undone by an earlier run of nearly five months without a win and were relegated to the Conference Premier after losing on the final day.

| Pos | Team | Pld | W | D | L | GF | GA | GD | Pts | Promotion, qualification or relegation |
|---|---|---|---|---|---|---|---|---|---|---|
| 1 | Notts County (C, P) | 46 | 27 | 12 | 7 | 96 | 31 | +65 | 93 | Promotion to Football League One |
| 2 | Bournemouth (P) | 46 | 25 | 8 | 13 | 61 | 44 | +17 | 83 | Promotion to Football League One |
| 3 | Rochdale (P) | 46 | 25 | 7 | 14 | 82 | 48 | +34 | 82 | Promotion to Football League One |
| 4 | Morecambe | 46 | 20 | 13 | 13 | 73 | 64 | +9 | 73 | Qualification to League Two play-offs |
| 5 | Rotherham United | 46 | 21 | 10 | 15 | 55 | 52 | +3 | 73 | Qualification to League Two play-offs |
| 6 | Aldershot Town | 46 | 20 | 12 | 14 | 69 | 56 | +13 | 72 | Qualification to League Two play-offs |
| 7 | Dagenham & Redbridge (O, P) | 46 | 20 | 12 | 14 | 69 | 58 | +11 | 72 | Qualification to League Two play-offs |
| 8 | Chesterfield | 46 | 21 | 7 | 18 | 61 | 62 | −1 | 70 | |
| 9 | Bury | 46 | 19 | 12 | 15 | 54 | 59 | −5 | 69 | |
| 10 | Port Vale | 46 | 17 | 17 | 12 | 61 | 50 | +11 | 68 | |
| 11 | Northampton Town | 46 | 18 | 13 | 15 | 62 | 53 | +9 | 67 | |
| 12 | Shrewsbury Town | 46 | 17 | 12 | 17 | 55 | 54 | +1 | 63 | |
| 13 | Burton Albion | 46 | 17 | 11 | 18 | 71 | 71 | 0 | 62 | |
| 14 | Bradford City | 46 | 16 | 14 | 16 | 59 | 62 | −3 | 62 | |
| 15 | Accrington Stanley | 46 | 18 | 7 | 21 | 62 | 74 | −12 | 61 | |
| 16 | Hereford United | 46 | 17 | 8 | 21 | 54 | 65 | −11 | 59 | |
| 17 | Torquay United | 46 | 14 | 15 | 17 | 64 | 55 | +9 | 57 | |
| 18 | Crewe Alexandra | 46 | 15 | 10 | 21 | 68 | 73 | −5 | 55 | |
| 19 | Macclesfield Town | 46 | 12 | 18 | 16 | 49 | 58 | −9 | 54 | |
| 20 | Lincoln City | 46 | 13 | 11 | 22 | 42 | 65 | −23 | 50 | |
| 21 | Barnet | 46 | 12 | 12 | 22 | 47 | 63 | −16 | 48 | |
| 22 | Cheltenham Town | 46 | 10 | 18 | 18 | 54 | 71 | −17 | 48 | |
| 23 | Grimsby Town (R) | 46 | 9 | 17 | 20 | 45 | 71 | −26 | 44 | Relegation to Conference National |
| 24 | Darlington (R) | 46 | 8 | 6 | 32 | 33 | 87 | −54 | 30 | Relegation to Conference National |

Updated to match(es) played on unknown. Source: football-league.co.uk
(C) Champions; (O) Play-off winners; (P) Promoted; (R) Relegated

Leading goalscorer: Lee Hughes (Notts County) – 30

== Women's football ==
=== Women's Premier League ===
==== National Division ====
| Pos | Team | Pld | W | D | L | GF | GA | GD | Pts | Qualification or relegation |
|---|---|---|---|---|---|---|---|---|---|---|
| 1 | Arsenal (C, P) | 22 | 20 | 1 | 1 | 79 | 19 | +60 | 61 | Qualification for the Champion League knockout phase Approved for FA WSL |
| 2 | Everton (P) | 22 | 16 | 2 | 4 | 67 | 19 | +48 | 50 | Qualification for the Champions League qualifying round Approved for FA WSL |
| 3 | Chelsea (P) | 22 | 16 | 1 | 5 | 60 | 27 | +33 | 49 | Approved for FA WSL |
| 4 | Leeds Carnegie | 22 | 15 | 2 | 5 | 50 | 16 | +34 | 47 | |
| 5 | Sunderland | 22 | 12 | 1 | 9 | 36 | 35 | +1 | 37 | |
| 6 | Doncaster Rovers Belles (P) | 22 | 9 | 7 | 6 | 36 | 37 | −1 | 34 | Approved for FA WSL |
| 7 | Blackburn Rovers | 22 | 7 | 3 | 12 | 27 | 45 | −18 | 24 | |
| 8 | Millwall Lionesses | 22 | 6 | 3 | 13 | 24 | 43 | −19 | 21 | |
| 9 | Watford | 22 | 4 | 5 | 13 | 23 | 60 | −37 | 17 | |
| 10 | Birmingham City (P) | 22 | 4 | 4 | 14 | 21 | 41 | −20 | 16 | Approved for FA WSL |
| 11 | Nottingham Forest | 22 | 3 | 4 | 15 | 16 | 51 | −35 | 13 | |
| 12 | Bristol Academy (P) | 22 | 3 | 1 | 18 | 12 | 58 | −46 | 10 | Approved for FA WSL |

Updated to match(es) played on 17 May 2010. Source: FA WPL
(C) Champions; (P) Promoted

==== Northern Division ====
| Pos | Team | Pld | W | D | L | GF | GA | GD | Pts | Promotion or relegation |
|---|---|---|---|---|---|---|---|---|---|---|
| 1 | Liverpool (C, P) | 22 | 19 | 2 | 1 | 59 | 19 | +40 | 59 | Approved for FA WSL |
| 2 | OOH Lincoln (P) | 22 | 15 | 4 | 3 | 46 | 22 | +24 | 49 | Approved for FA WSL |
| 3 | Leicester City | 22 | 11 | 6 | 5 | 53 | 35 | +18 | 39 | |
| 4 | Manchester City | 22 | 10 | 6 | 6 | 36 | 25 | +11 | 36 | |
| 5 | Curzon Ashton | 22 | 9 | 4 | 9 | 37 | 39 | −2 | 31 | |
| 6 | Aston Villa | 22 | 7 | 8 | 7 | 37 | 35 | +2 | 29 | |
| 7 | Leeds City Vixens | 22 | 9 | 2 | 11 | 41 | 48 | −7 | 29 | |
| 8 | Newcastle United | 22 | 7 | 6 | 9 | 38 | 48 | −10 | 27 | |
| 9 | Preston North End | 22 | 6 | 6 | 10 | 56 | 54 | +2 | 24 | |
| 10 | Derby County | 22 | 5 | 5 | 12 | 30 | 51 | −21 | 20 | |
| 11 | Sheffield Wednesday (R) | 22 | 4 | 6 | 12 | 29 | 50 | −21 | 18 | Relegation to the Northern Combination League |
| 12 | Luton Town (R) | 22 | 1 | 3 | 18 | 12 | 48 | −36 | 6 | Relegation to the South East Combination League |

Updated to match(es) played on 17 May 2010. Source: FA WPL
(C) Champions; (P) Promoted; (R) Relegated

==== Southern Division ====
| Pos | Team | Pld | W | D | L | GF | GA | GD | Pts | Promotion or relegation |
|---|---|---|---|---|---|---|---|---|---|---|
| 1 | Barnet (C, P) | 22 | 16 | 4 | 2 | 53 | 18 | +35 | 52 | Promotion to the National Division |
| 2 | Reading (P) | 22 | 13 | 5 | 4 | 43 | 28 | +15 | 44 | Promotion to the National Division |
| 3 | Keynsham Town | 22 | 12 | 5 | 5 | 55 | 36 | +19 | 41 | |
| 4 | Portsmouth | 22 | 11 | 6 | 5 | 42 | 32 | +10 | 39 | |
| 5 | West Ham United | 22 | 9 | 9 | 4 | 38 | 24 | +14 | 36 | |
| 6 | Cardiff City | 22 | 10 | 5 | 7 | 44 | 32 | +12 | 35 | |
| 7 | Charlton Athletic | 22 | 10 | 4 | 8 | 24 | 20 | +4 | 34 | |
| 8 | Brighton & Hove Albion | 22 | 6 | 8 | 8 | 33 | 33 | 0 | 26 | |
| 9 | Colchester United | 22 | 6 | 5 | 11 | 19 | 40 | −21 | 23 | |
| 10 | Queen's Park Rangers | 22 | 5 | 5 | 12 | 42 | 43 | −1 | 20 | |
| 11 | Fulham (R) | 22 | 2 | 2 | 18 | 14 | 63 | −49 | 8 | Club folded at the end of the season |
| 12 | Crystal Palace (R) | 22 | 1 | 4 | 17 | 12 | 50 | −38 | 7 | Relegation to the South East Combination League |

Updated to match(es) played on 17 May 2010. Source: FA WPL
(C) Champions; (P) Promoted; (R) Relegated

=== FA Women's Cup ===
==== Final ====
3 May 2010
15:00 BST

| Arsenal | 2–3 (a.e.t.) | Everton |
|---|---|---|
| Little 43' (pen.); Fleeting 54' | Report | Dowie 16', 119'; White 45+2' (o.g.) |

City Ground, Nottingham
Attendance: 17,505
Referee: Hong Eun-Ah (South Korea)

== Clubs that folded ==
| Club | League | Date of Dissolution |
|---|---|---|
| Newcastle Blue Star | Northern Premier League Premier Division | June 2009 |
| King's Lynn | Northern Premier League Premier Division | 25 November 2009 |
| Chester City | Conference National | 10 March 2010 |
| Farsley Celtic | Conference North | 10 March 2010 |

== Deaths ==
- 12 July 2009 – Tommy Cummings, 80, former defender who made 479 appearances for Burnley, and was a member of the Clarets' side that won the league championship in 1959–60. Later became player-manager of Mansfield Town, and also had a short spell as Aston Villa manager.
- 21 July 2009 – Dai Lawrence, 62, former full-back who played four seasons for Swansea City in the late 1960s.
- 31 July 2009 – Sir Bobby Robson, 76, former inside-forward and manager. As a player, he played for Fulham and West Bromwich Albion, and won 20 caps for England. As manager, he reached even greater heights, being appointed to Ipswich Town in 1969 and over the next 13 years taking them to FA Cup and UEFA Cup glory (also finishing second in the league in his final two seasons as manager), before leaving in 1982 to manage England for eight years during which they reached the quarter-final of the World Cup in 1986 and to the semi-final in 1990, only losing on penalties. He later managed PSV, Porto and Barcelona before returning home to manage his boyhood favourites Newcastle United from 1999 to 2004, during which time they qualified for Europe on three occasions. He was knighted for his services to football in 2002. His death came after a 17-year battle against cancer which had gone into remission four times.
- 2 August 2009 – Joe Livingstone, 67, former striker who scored 42 goals in 82 appearances for Carlisle United, and also played for Middlesbrough and Hartlepool United.
- 9 August 2009 – Tommy Clinton, 83, former defender who spent eight seasons at Everton, and was capped three times by the Republic of Ireland. Also played briefly for Blackburn Rovers and Tranmere Rovers.
- 19 August 2009 – Bobby Thomson, 65, full-back capped eight times by England. He played 278 league matches for Wolverhampton Wanderers, 110 for Luton Town and also played for Birmingham City, Walsall, Port Vale, and in the United States.
- 13 September 2009 – Paul Shirtliff, 46, former defender who played in The Football League for Sheffield Wednesday and Northampton Town, and also had a long career at non-league level.
- 24 September 2009 – Terry Bly, 73, former striker who most notably holds the post-war single-season goalscoring record in The Football League, having scored 52 goals for Peterborough United in 1960–61. Also played for Norwich City, Coventry City and Notts County.
- 26 September 2009 – Geoff Barrowcliffe, 77, former Derby County full-back who spent 16 seasons with the Rams, playing more than 500 first-team matches. He also played for several non-league clubs including Ilkeston Town and Boston United.
- 5 October 2009 – Tommy Capel, 87, former inside-forward who most notably played five seasons for Nottingham Forest, where he scored 72 goals in 162 appearances. Also played for Manchester City, Chesterfield, Birmingham City, Coventry City and Halifax Town.
- 8 October 2009 – Alex McCrae, 89, former inside-forward who scored 49 goals in a five-year spell with Middlesbrough in the early 1950s. Also played for Charlton Athletic, and for Hearts and Falkirk in his native Scotland.
- 12 October 2009 – Stan Palk, 87, former inside-forward who played for Liverpool and Port Vale in the immediate post-war years.
- 17 October 2009 – David Burnside, 69, former midfielder who played for a number of clubs, but is probably best remembered from his five-year spell with West Bromwich Albion. Some of his other clubs include Southampton, Crystal Palace, Wolverhampton Wanderers and Plymouth Argyle.
- 21 October 2009 – John Jarman, 78, former Barnsley and Walsall wing-half, who later worked as a coach for Wolverhampton Wanderers, West Bromwich Albion, Mansfield Town and Derby County.
- 22 October 2009 – Ray Lambert, 87, former Wales international full-back who played more than 300 matches for Liverpool, where he won the 1946–47 league title.
- 2 November 2009 – Keith Kettleborough, 74, former inside-forward who spent the majority of his career with Rotherham United and Sheffield United, and also had a spell as player-manager at Doncaster Rovers.
- 7 November 2009 – Billy Ingham, 57, former Burnley midfielder who spent eleven years with the Clarets, playing more than 250 matches for the club before finishing his career with a spell at Bradford City.
- 15 November 2009 – Ray Charnley, 74, former Blackpool striker who is one of the Seasiders' most prolific scorers of all time, with 222 goals in 407 appearances for the club. He won one England cap while at Blackpool, and also played for Morecambe, Wrexham and Bradford Park Avenue.
- 15 November 2009 – Don Martin, 65, former striker who scored more than 100 goals in a 16-year career with Northampton Town and Blackburn Rovers.
- 23 November 2009 – Tony Parry, 64, former central defender who spent the majority of his nine-year professional career with Hartlepool United, and also had a brief spell with Derby County before dropping down to non-league football.
- 25 November 2009 – Mike Tiddy, 80, former winger who began his career at Torquay United before making over 100 appearances with Cardiff City and Brighton & Hove Albion as well as making over 50 appearances for Arsenal.
- 29 November 2009 – George Cummins, 78, former inside-forward who began his career at Everton, but spent the majority of his 12-year professional career with Luton Town. He also had a brief spell at Hull City, and was capped 19 times for the Republic of Ireland.
- 1 December 2009 – Neil Dougall, 88, inside-forward or wing-half who played nearly 100 matches for Birmingham City and more than 300 for Plymouth Argyle, a club he later managed. Capped once for Scotland.
- 14 December 2009 – Alan A'Court, 75, former Liverpool winger who spent 13 seasons with the Reds, playing 382 matches, before finishing his career at Tranmere Rovers. He was also capped five times by England, and played for his country in the 1958 World Cup.
- 16 December 2009 – Dennis Herod, 86, former Stoke City goalkeeper who was a member of the team that came within two points of winning the league title in 1946–47, and famously scored a goal for the club in 1952 against Aston Villa. Also played for Stockport County.
- 20 December 2009 – Jack Brownsword, 86, former left-back who spent nearly his entire career with Scunthorpe United, playing a club-record 597 league appearances for the Iron between 1950 and 1964. Also had a brief spell with Hull City prior to joining Scunthorpe.
- 22 December 2009 – Albert Scanlon, 74, former Manchester United winger and Busby Babe who survived the Munich air disaster. Played 115 league matches for the Red Devils, and was a member of the 1955–56 and 1956–57 championship-winning sides. Later played for Newcastle United, Lincoln City and Mansfield Town.
- 7 January 2010 – Alex Parker, 74, former full-back who was a member of Everton's 1962–63 championship-winning side, and played for Scotland in the 1958 World Cup. Also played for Falkirk and Southport.
- 20 January 2010 – Jack Parry, 86, former goalkeeper who played for Swansea Town and Ipswich Town, and was capped once by Wales in 1951.
- 30 January 2010 – Jackie Newton, 84, former wing-half who spent 12 years with Hartlepool United, making 361 first-team appearances. Began his career at Newcastle United, but failed to make an appearance for the Magpies.
- 3 February 2010 – Gil Merrick, 88, former Birmingham City goalkeeper and manager who served the club for more than 25 years. As a player, he appeared in 485 league matches for the Blues, and was also capped 23 times by England, playing in the 1954 World Cup. As manager, he won the 1963 League Cup, beating arch-rivals Aston Villa in the final.
- 11 February 2010 – Petar Borota, 56, Serbian goalkeeper who played for Chelsea between 1979 and 1982, and whose other clubs include Partizan and Porto. Won four caps for the former Yugoslavia.
- 11 February 2010 – Brian Godfrey, 69, former striker who played for six clubs, most notably Scunthorpe United, Preston North End and Aston Villa, where he played in the 1971 League Cup final. He also won three caps for Wales, and was manager at Exeter City and several non-league clubs.
- 22 February 2010 – Bobby Smith, 56, former midfielder who spent eight seasons at Leicester City between 1978 and 1986, and also had a long career in his native Scotland, mostly with Hibernian and Dunfermline Athletic.
- 27 February 2010 – Charlie Crowe, 85, former Newcastle United defender who was a member of the Magpies' 1951 FA Cup winning side. Also played for Mansfield Town at the tail end of his career.
- 28 February 2010 – Adam Blacklaw, 72, former Burnley goalkeeper who played more than 300 matches for the Clarets, and was a member of Burnley's 1959–60 championship-winning squad. Also played for Blackburn Rovers, and Scotland at international level.
- 3 March 2010 – Keith Alexander, 53, manager and former striker who was manager of Macclesfield Town at the time of his death, and had also managed Lincoln City and Peterborough United earlier in his career. As player, he was a journeyman striker who spent most of his career in non-league football, but also had a few spells in the Football League, primarily with Grimsby Town and Lincoln City.
- 4 March 2010 – Tony Richards, 75, former striker who is Walsall's second-leading scorer of all time with 185 league goals for the Saddlers between 1954 and 1963. Also spent three seasons with Port Vale.
- 15 March 2010 – Charlie Ashcroft, 83, former goalkeeper who spent nine years at Liverpool, mostly as the team's second-choice goalkeeper, and also had spells at Ipswich Town and Coventry City late in his career.
- 19 March 2010 – Bob Curtis, 60, former right-back who made more than 350 appearances for Charlton Athletic during an 11-year spell at The Valley. Also played for Mansfield Town and Kettering Town.
- 24 March 2010 – George Luke, 76, former left-winger who spent his entire career in the North East, playing almost 200 matches for Hartlepools United before joining Newcastle United, where he stayed just over a year before finishing his career with Darlington.
- 6 April 2010 – Sid Storey, 90, former inside-forward who spent nine years at York City, where he played more than 350 matches and scored 42 goals. Also had short spells with Barnsley and Accrington Stanley.
- 8 April 2010 – Stan Smith, 79, former inside-forward who spent most of his career with Port Vale, and also played for Crewe Alexandra and Oldham Athletic.
- 11 April 2010 – John Batchelor, 51, controversial former owner and chairman of York City.
- 13 April 2010 – Charlie Timmins, 87, former Coventry City full-back who spent his entire ten-year professional career at Highfield Road.
- 21 April 2010 – Tony Ingham, 85, former full-back who spent most of his career at Queens Park Rangers, where he made a club-record 514 league appearances between 1950 and 1963, and later spent many years as QPR's commercial director after retiring as a player. Began his career at Leeds United.
- 25 April 2010 – Ian Lawther, 70, former Northern Ireland international striker who played 17 seasons in The Football League for six different clubs, most notably Sunderland and Blackburn Rovers. Capped four times for Northern Ireland.
- 11 May 2010 – Brian Gibson, 82, former Huddersfield Town full-back who played 171 first-team matches for the Terriers, his only club at professional level.
- 15 May 2010 – Besian Idrizaj, 22, Swansea City striker who died from a heart attack while visiting his family in Austria. He had played three matches for the Swans during the 2009–10 season, and was previously on the books of Liverpool, with loan spells at Luton Town and Crystal Palace. He was also a former Austria under-21 international.
