= Robert Gilfillan (disambiguation) =

Robert Gilfillan may refer to:

- Robert Gilfillan (1798-1850) Scottish poet and songwriter
- Bobby Gilfillan (footballer, born 1926) (1926-2018), Scottish footballer
- Bobby Gilfillan (footballer, born 1938) (1938-2012), Scottish footballer
