= Bobby Gilfillan =

Bobby Gilfillan may refer to:

- Bobby Gilfillan (footballer, born 1926) (1926–2018), Scottish professional footballer
- Bobby Gilfillan (footballer, born 1938), Scottish professional footballer

== See also ==
- Robert Gilfillan, Scottish poet and songwriter
