= List of Gateshead F.C. seasons =

This is a list of seasons played by Gateshead F.C. in English football, from 1977 to the present day. It details the club's achievements in major competitions, and the top scorers for each season.

== Seasons ==
Season	League									FA Cup	FA Trophy	Other Cups	Top scorer	
Season	Division	P	W	D	L	F	A	Pts	Pos	FA Cup	FA Trophy	Other Cups	Top scorer	
Gateshead United folded in 1977. Gateshead FC formed and replaced them in the Northern Premier League
1977–78	NPLP (6)	46	16	5	25	65	74	37	17th	—N/a	—N/a	ULC - R1	Bob Topping	11
1978–79	NPLP (6)	44	11	11	22	42	63	33	21st	4Q	3Q	ULC - R1	Bob Topping	20
1979–80	NPLP (6)	42	11	11	20	50	77	33	16th	1Q	2Q	ULC - R1	Bob Topping	22
1980–81	NPLP (6)	42	12	18	12	65	61	42	11th	R1	R1		Bob Topping	25
1981–82	NPLP (6)	42	19	14	9	65	49	52	4th	1Q	2Q		Steve Holbrook	12
1982–83	NPLP (6)	42	32	4	6	114	43	100	1st	3Q	2Q		Jim Pearson	31
1983–84	CONFP (5)	42	12	13	17	59	73	42	16th	2Q	R3	CLC - R2	Bob Topping	16
1984–85	CONFP (5)	42	9	12	21	51	82	33	21st	3Q	R2	CLC - R1	Ian Donaldson	20
1985–86	NPLP (6)	42	24	10	8	85	51	82	1st	3Q	3Q	ULS - W	Keith McNall	27
1986–87	CONFP (5)	42	6	13	23	48	95	31	22nd	1Q	R2	CLC - R2	Keith McNall	17
1987–88	NPLP (6)	42	11	7	24	52	71	40	18th	1Q	R2	ULC - R1	Keith McNall	8
1988–89	NPLP (6)	42	7	13	22	36	70	34	21st	2Q	3Q		Ian Donaldson	7
1989–90	NPLP (6)	42	22	10	10	78	58	76	2nd	3Q	2Q	ULC - RU	Keith McNall	30
1990–91	CONFP (5)	42	14	6	22	52	92	48	17th	1Q	R2	CLC - R1	Charlie Butler; Richie Allen	12
1991–92	CONFP (5)	42	12	12	18	49	57	48	14th	4Q	R3	CLC - R1	Alan Lamb	14
1992–93	CONFP (5)	42	14	10	18	53	56	52	14th	R1	QF	CLC - R1	Alan Lamb	22
1993–94	CONFP (5)	42	15	12	15	45	53	57	11th	3Q	QF	CLC - R2	Paul Dobson	34
1994–95	CONFP (5)	42	19	10	13	61	53	67	7th	2Q	R3	CLC - R1	Paul Dobson	32
1995–96	CONFP (5)	42	18	13	11	58	46	67	5th	2Q	QF	SCC - R3	Steve Harkus	20
1996–97	CONFP (5)	42	15	11	16	59	63	56	10th	4Q	R1	SCC - R2	Paul Thompson	23
1997–98	CONFP (5)	42	8	11	23	51	87	35	21st	2Q	R2	SCC - R3	Steve Bowey	14
1998–99	NPLP (6)	42	17	12	13	68	58	63	7th	4Q	R1	ULC - R3	Keith Fletcher	17
1999–2000	NPLP (6)	44	23	13	8	79	41	82	3rd	R1	R2	ULC - GR2; CC - QF	Steve Preen	21
2000–01	NPLP (6)	44	16	12	16	68	61	60	11th	R2	R2	ULC - GR1	Wayne Edgcumbe	22
2001–02	NPLP (6)	44	14	14	16	58	71	56	14th	2Q	R2	ULC - GR; DCC - SF; PC - QF	Steve Preen	23
2002–03	NPLP (6)	44	10	11	23	60	81	41	21st	2Q	R1	ULC - RU; DCC - QF	Rob Jones; Dave Colvin	12
2003–04	NPL1 (7)	42	21	4	17	65	68	63	6th	PRE	R1	ULC - R1; DCC - QF; CC - R1	Paul Thompson	23
2004–05	NPLP (7)	42	11	12	19	61	84	45	17th	4Q	R1	ULC - R2; DCC - SF; PC - R1	Paul Taylor	20
2005–06	NPLP (7)	42	12	10	20	52	77	46	17th	2Q	2Q	ULC - R2; DCC - R1; PC - R1	Adam Johnston	18
2006–07	NPLP (7)	42	17	14	11	75	57	65	9th	2Q	R1	ULC - R1; DCC - R1	David Southern	31
2007–08	NPLP (7)	40	26	7	7	93	42	85	3rd	2Q	R1	ULC - SF; DCC - RU	David Southern	22
2008–09	CONFN (6)	42	24	8	10	81	48	80	2nd	3Q	3Q	CLC - R3	Lee Novak	28
2009–10	CONFP (5)	44	13	7	24	46	69	45	20th	R1	R3		Daryl Clare	15
2010–11	CONFP (5)	46	14	15	17	65	68	57	14th	R1	SF		Jon Shaw	21
2011–12	CONFP (5)	46	21	11	14	69	62	74	8th	R2	QF		Jon Shaw	35
2012–13	CONFP (5)	46	13	16	17	58	61	55	17th	4Q	R3		Josh Gillies	15
2013–14	CONFP (5)	46	22	13	11	72	50	79	3rd	R1	R2		James Marwood	15
2014–15	CONFP (5)	46	17	15	14	66	62	66	10th	R3	R3		Alex Rodman	11
2015–16	National (5)	46	19	10	17	59	70	67	9th	4Q	QF		Ryan Bowman	20
2016–17	National (5)	46	19	13	14	72	51	70	8th	4Q	R2		Danny Johnson	18
2017–18	National (5)	46	12	18	16	62	58	54	17th	R2	SF		Danny Johnson	2
2018–19	National (5)	46	19	9	18	52	48	57	17th	R1	R1		Scott Boden	12
2019–20	Nat. North (6)	31	14	10	7	47	31	52	—N/a	R1	3Q		Joshua Kayode; JJ O'Donnell; Jordan Preston	8
2020–21	Nat. North (6)	14	6	3	5	17	15	21	—N/a	QR2	R2		Paul Blackett	5
2021–22	Nat. North (6)	42	29	7	6	99	47	94	1st	R2	R2		Macaulay Langstaff	30
2022–23	National (5)	46	15	15	16	67	62	59	14th	R1	RU		Adam Campbell	14
2023–24	National (5)	46	46	22	9	15	88	64	6th	R1	C		Marcus Dinanga	19
2024–25	National (5)	46	19	10	17	76	68	67	8th	QR4	R4			

Champions	Runners-up	Promoted	Relegated

== Key ==
- P = Played
- W = Games won
- D = Games drawn
- L = Games lost
- F = Goals for
- A = Goals against
- Pts = Points
- Pos = Final position
- National = National League
- CONFP = Conference Premier
- CONFN = Conference North
- NPLP = Northern Premier League Premier Division
- NPL1 = Northern Premier League First Division
- CLC = Conference League Cup
- ULC = Unibond League Challenge Cup
- ULS = Unibond League Challenge Shield
- CC = Unibond League Chairman's Cup
- PC = Unibond League President's Cup
- DCC = Durham Challenge Cup
- SCC = Senior County Cup
- DSP = Durham Senior Professional Cup
- GR1 = First Group Stage
- GR2 = Second Group Stage
- PRE = Preliminary Round
- 1Q = First Qualifying Round
- 2Q = Second Qualifying Round
- 3Q = Third Qualifying Round
- 4Q = Fourth Qualifying Round
- R1 = Round 1
- R2 = Round 2
- R3 = Round 3
- R4 = Round 4
- QF = Quarter-finals
- SF = Semi-finals
- RU = Runners-up
- W = Winners

== See also ==
- List of Gateshead A.F.C. seasons

== Sources ==
- Gateshead F.C. at the Football Club History Database
- Unofficial Gateshead Football Club Statistics Database
- Since 1888... The Searchable Premiership and Football League Player Database
