= John Ingham =

John Ingham may refer to:

- John Ingham (footballer) (1924–2000), English footballer
- John Ingham (businessman) (1928–2003), Australian businessman
- John Ingham, English musical journalist, better known under his pseudonym Jonh Ingham
