= Kettleborough =

Kettleborough is an English surname. Notable people with the surname include:

- James Kettleborough (born 1992), English cricketer
- Keith Kettleborough (1935–2009), English footballer
- Richard Kettleborough (born 1973), English cricketer and umpire
