= Scotson =

Scotson is a surname. Notable persons with this name include:

- Callum Scotson (born 1996), Australian cyclist
- Frederick Scotson Clark (1840–1883), English organist and composer
- Miles Scotson (born 1994), Australian cyclist, brother of Callum
- Reg Scotson (1919–1999), English footballer
