= Charles Hogan =

Charles Hogan may refer to:

- Charles V. Hogan (1897-1971), American politician
- Charlie Hogan (1926-1992), English footballer
