= Ben Gilliland =

British writer (born 1976)

Ben Gilliland (born 30 January 1976) is an author, science writer and graphic journalist. Originally from Darlington in County Durham, he now lives and works in Royal Tunbridge Wells, Kent.

== Professional life and awards ==
From 1999 until 2010 Gilliland worked at the Metro Newspaper in London, initially as the graphics editor. In 2005 he was appointed as editor of MetroCosm, the paper's popular graphics-based science feature created by Gilliland.

After leaving the Metro in 2010, Gilliland pursued a career as a freelance science writer and educator while continuing to create the Cosm series and publish them via CosmOnline.

In April 2015 he was appointed as editor of Astronomy Now magazine, a post first occupied by Patrick Moore, to succeed Keith Cooper from September 2015.

In 2013 Gilliland was awarded the Sir Arthur Clarke Award (popularly known as an "Arthur") for Space Achievement in Media. The award was presented at the UK Space Conference at the Glasgow Science Centre by Tim Peake the UK's first ESA astronaut.

== Publications ==
- 100 People Who Made History: Meet the People Who Shaped the Modern World, 2012
- Science But Not As We Know It, 2015
- Rocket Science for the Rest of us , 2015
- How to Build a Universe: From the Big Bang to the End of the Universe, 2015
