= Max D. Gilfillan =

American football coach and administrator (1894–1954)

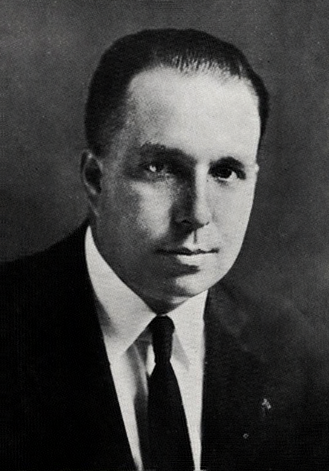
- Gilfillan, pictured in The Trail, yearbook of Daniel Baker College, 1922

Biographical details
- Born: March 22, 1894; St. Johnsbury, Vermont, U.S.
- Died: May 24, 1954 (aged 60); Tyler, Texas, U.S.

Playing career

Football
- 1914–1916: Texas A&M

Baseball
- 1915: Texas A&M
- Positions: Halfback (football); Pitcher (baseball)

Coaching career (HC unless noted)

Football
- 1921–1923: Daniel Baker

Administrative career (AD unless noted)
- 1921–?: Daniel Baker

Head coaching record
- Overall: 6–16–1

Max Dole Gilfillan (March 22, 1894 – May 24, 1954) was an American college football coach and college athletics administrator. He served as the head football coach at Daniel Baker College in Brownwood, Texas from 1921 to 1923. Gilfillan played football at Texas A&M University from 1914 to 1916.

Gilfillan served in the United States Marine Corps in World War I and World War II, reaching the rank of lieutenant colonel. A native of St. Johnsbury, Vermont, he was wounded in action during World War I. Gilfillan worked in the brick business and was a resident of Tyler, Texas for 28 years, until his death there on May 24, 1954.

== Head coaching record ==
Year	Team	Overall	Conference	Standing	Bowl/playoffs
Daniel Baker Hill Billies (Texas Intercollegiate Athletic Association) (1921–1923)
1921	Daniel Baker	3–4–1	0–2	T–8th	
1922	Daniel Baker	2–6	2–4	8th	
1923	Daniel Baker	1–6	1–5	12th	
Daniel Baker:		6–16–1	3–11		
Total:		6–16–1			
