= Danny Boxshall =

English footballer

Personal information
- Date of birth: 2 April 1920
- Place of birth: Bradford, England
- Date of death: 5 November 2009 (aged 89)
- Place of death: Shipley, England
- Position: Winger

Youth career
- Alston Works
- Wilsden
- 19??–1946: Salem Athletic

Senior career*
| Years | Team | Apps | (Gls) |
| 1946–1948 | Queens Park Rangers | 29 | (14) |
| 1948–1950 | Bristol City | 52 | (10) |
| 1950–1952 | Bournemouth | 51 | (8) |
| 1952–1954 | Rochdale | 11 | (3) |
| 1954–195? | Chelmsford City | | (?) |
- * Club domestic league appearances and goals

Daniel Boxshall (2 April 1920 – 5 November 2009) was an English footballer who played as a winger. He made over 140 Football League appearances in the years after the Second World War.

== Career ==
Boxshall played locally in the Bradford Amateur League for Alston Works, Wilsden and Salem Athletic in Yorkshire. Boxshall also represented the British Army of the Rhine. Boxshall joined Queens Park Rangers in January 1946. Bob Hewison signed Boxshall for £2,575 in May 1948 from QPR for Bristol City. Boxshall left Bristol City and joined Bournemouth in July 1950. Boxshall left Bournemouth and joined Rochdale in July 1952. Boxshall later played in the Southern League for Chelmsford City.

After retiring from football Boxshall was an insurance agent for Prudential in Chelmsford for 25 years before retiring in April 1981. He then moved back to Shipkley in Yorkshire.

Boxshall was signed as a professional without having been seen by any of the Queens Park Rangers club officials. He was signed and played in a New Year's Day match on the recommendation of having won the Military Medal. Boxshall was learning how to make pianos, but when he was near the end of the course, Union officials said it was not fair that he should have two jobs. Football became his means of livelihood.

== Personal life ==
Earlier, in late March 1945, Boxshall, serving as an acting sergeant of the 53rd Reconnaissance Regiment, Royal Armoured Corps, won the Military Medal while in charge of a Bren gun crew during the Western Allied invasion of Germany. Boxshall was commanding the lead reconnaissance car after his troop had been ordered to seize a bridge over the River Berkel in the town of Vreden. As he approached the bridge, his car was engaged by German soldiers, but Boxshall ordered his driver to accelerate towards the enemy. The vehicle sped towards the bridge, Boxshall firing his Bren gun, and the remaining defenders threw down their arms and surrendered without destroying the valuable crossing point. The recommendation spoke of his 'boldness and dash...without any consideration for his personal safety'.

== Honours ==
Queens Park Rangers

- Football League Third Division South winner: 1947–48
