= Murder of Karen Gilliland =

2020 murder of Australian woman

Karen Gilliland
- Born: Karen Jayne Cranston; 14 July 1977; Rockhampton, Queensland, Australia
- Died: 23 June 2020 (aged 42); Rockhampton, Queensland, Australia
- Cause of death: Multiple stab wounds
- Known for: Domestic violence victim, author of Where is Selma?
- Spouse: Nigel Gilliland (separated)

Karen Jayne Gilliland (née Cranston; 14 July 1977 - 23 June 2020) was an Australian Pathology CSR Supervisor with Pathology Queensland and children's author who was murdered in Rockhampton, Queensland.

She was killed by her estranged husband and the father of her children, Nigel Gilliland, who stabbed her 26 times in a domestic violence attack on the evening of 23 June 2020 at a Brae Street rental property in the suburb of The Range where Karen was living.

Nigel Gilliland pleaded guilty to his wife's murder in Rockhampton Supreme Court on 30 August 2021 and was sentenced to life imprisonment which has a legislated non-parole period of 20 years.

During sentencing, Justice Graeme Crow described the attack as "vicious", "ferocious", "prolonged" and "unimaginable" which was "particularly cruel to the children", labelling Gilliland as a "cold and cruel murderer".

After consuming half a bottle of wine and prescription painkillers, Nigel Gilliland sharpened two knives and drove to Karen Gilliland's house where he stabbed her 26 times in front of two of her three children after which he fled the scene but was arrested two hours later following a large scale search. He was admitted to hospital under police guard with self-inflicted wounds. After undergoing surgery, he was charged with one count each of murder (domestic violence offence) and entering a dwelling with intent and was remanded in custody.

During a mentioning in the Rockhampton Supreme Court on 2 August 2021, Nigel Gilliland's lawyer told the court that her client intended to plead guilty to murder. Nigel Gilliland subsequently pleaded guilty on 30 August 2021.

The court heard the rental property where Karen Gilliland was living had been organised by her family in an attempt to keep her husband away from her after years of abusive and threatening behaviour. Their marriage had consisted of numerous violent confrontations and arguments and they had separated and reunited numerous times. Nigel Gilliland had already twice breached a domestic violence order in May 2013.

Karen Gilliland worked as a nurse in a pathology lab at Rockhampton Hospital where she had been treating COVID-19 patients. At the time of her death, she was a mother to three surviving children. Her first-born child died at the age of three weeks in 2004 and she also miscarried twins.

Her murder, which was extensively reported in the Australian media, prompted a wave of support and sympathy from the local and Australian community.

Karen Gilliland's brother Bryan Cranston established a GoFundMe fundraiser on 27 June 2020 for her children. As of December 2021, more than $61,000 has been raised.

A candlelight vigil, held mostly virtually, was held on 28 June 2020 hosted by Keppel MP Brittany Lauga on the Fitzroy riverbank. After Karen Gilliland's death, her brother, mother and stepfather moved to the city to help care for her three children.

Her funeral was held at St Joseph's Cathedral on 7 July 2020 which was also livestreamed. It was followed by a wake at a sports club in Norman Gardens. She was buried at the Rockhampton Memorial Gardens in Nerimbera beside her deceased son.

A children's book written by Karen Gilliland called "Where is Selma?" was published with the assistance of The Broken Ballerina Foundation who used money raised by friend and illustrator Melissa Swinson to get the book published.

According to the Australian Bureau of Statistics, Karen Gilliland was one of 86 Australian women who were killed by domestic or family violence in 2020.

== See also ==
- Domestic violence in Australia
- Murder of Hannah Clarke
