= Cec McCormack =

English footballer

Personal information
- Full name: John Cecil McCormack
- Date of birth: 15 February 1922
- Place of birth: Chester-le-Street, England
- Date of death: 1995 (aged 72–73)
- Position: Centre forward

Senior career*
Years	Team	Apps	(Gls)
1941–1947	Gateshead	167	(147)
1947–1949	Middlesbrough	37	(18)
1949–1950	Chelmsford City		
1950–1951	Barnsley	50	(42)
1951–1955	Notts County	82	(35)
1955–19??	King's Lynn		
- Polish White Eagles
- * Club domestic league appearances and goals

John Cecil McCormack (15 February 1922 – 1995) was an English footballer who played as a centre forward.

McCormack started his career with Gateshead, moving to neighbours Middlesbrough in April 1947 before a spell at non-league Chelmsford City. He signed for Barnsley in July 1950, spending just over a year there and setting a new club record for goals in a single season with 33. He moved to Notts County in November 1951. After 4 years at Notts County, McCormack played for non-league King's Lynn before joining Canadian side Polish White Eagles, based in Toronto.
