= Jack Wesley =

English footballer

Personal information
- Full name: John Crawshay Wesley
- Date of birth: 19 January 1908
- Place of birth: Cheltenham, England
- Date of death: 1946 (aged 37–38)
- Height: 5 ft 8 1/2 in (1.74 m)
- Position: Inside forward

Senior career*
Years	Team	Apps	(Gls)
1931–1933	St Austell		
1933–1934	Gateshead	52	(31)
1934–1939	Bradford Park Avenue	141	(25)
- * Club domestic league appearances and goals

John Crawshay Wesley (19 January 1908 – 1946) was an English footballer who played as an inside forward.

Wesley began his career at non-league St Austell before playing league football for Gateshead and Bradford Park Avenue from 1933 to 1939. He played over 200 league and cup games during this period, scoring a total of 60 goals.

== Sources ==
- "Player Details: Jack Wesley". English National Football Archive.
