= Alan Trewick =

English footballer (1941–1993)

Personal information
- Date of birth: 27 April 1941
- Place of birth: Blyth, England
- Date of death: June 1993 (aged 52)
- Place of death: Newcastle upon Tyne, England
- Position: Centre-forward

Senior career*
Years	Team	Apps	(Gls)
1959–1960	Gateshead	10	(1)
- North Shields
- Gateshead
- * Club domestic league appearances and goals

Alan Trewick (27 April 1941 – June 1993) was an English footballer who played as a centre-forward.

== Career ==
Trewick scored three goals in 11 league and cup appearances for Gateshead (then of the Football League Fourth Division) during the 1959–60 season. He also played non-league football for Gateshead and North Shields.

== Sources ==
- Alan Trewick at Post War English & Scottish Football League A–Z Player's Transfer Database
- "Alan Trewick". Barry Hugman's Footballers. Archived from the original on 8 June 2024.
- English National Football Archive
