= Gerry Coyne =

English footballer

Personal information
- Full name: Gerard Aloysius Coyne
- Date of birth: 9 August 1948 (age 78)
- Place of birth: Hebburn, England
- Position: Centre forward

Senior career*
Years	Team	Apps	(Gls)
- Reyrolles
1966–1967	York City	2	(0)
1967–1968	South Shields		
1968–1969	Gateshead		
1969–1970	Scarborough		
1970–1971	Gateshead		
1971–1972	Berwick Rangers	8	(5)
1972–1973	Limerick		
1972–1974	Cork Hibernians		
- * Club domestic league appearances and goals

Gerard Aloysius Coyne (born 9 August 1948) is an English former footballer who played in the Football League as a centre forward for York City and in the Scottish Football League for Berwick Rangers. He also played non-league football for South Shields, Gateshead and Scarborough.

He signed for Limerick for the 1972-73 League of Ireland season but after a few months he moved to Cork Hibernians in November 1972. The season ended with Hibs winning the FAI Cup after a replay which secured European football in the 1973–74 European Cup Winners' Cup where they played FC Baník Ostrava. Coyne played in the home leg at Flower Lodge appearing as a substitute.

== Honours ==
- FAI Cup:
  - Cork Hibernians – 1973
- League of Ireland Shield
  - Cork Hibernians – 1973
- Dublin City Cup:
  - Cork Hibernians – 1973
- Munster Senior Cup
  - Cork Hibernians – 1973
