= Terry Lyons (footballer) =

English footballer

Personal information
- Full name: Terence Lyons
- Date of birth: 14 February 1929
- Place of birth: Bradford, England
- Date of death: 1986 (aged 56 or 57)
- Position: Winger

Senior career*
Years	Team	Apps	(Gls)
1949–1951	Burnley	12	(3)
1951–1953	Bradford Park Avenue	38	(6)
- Weymouth
- * Club domestic league appearances and goals

Terence Lyons (14 February 1929 – 1986) was an English professional footballer who played as a winger. He played fifty matches in the Football League for Burnley and Bradford Park Avenue, before moving into non-league football with Weymouth.
