= Alec McCue =

Scottish footballer

Personal information
- Full name: Alexander Bain McCue
- Date of birth: 25 November 1927
- Place of birth: Greenock, Scotland
- Date of death: 25 October 1989 (aged 61)
- Place of death: Folkestone, Kent
- Height: 5 ft 6 in (1.68 m)
- Position: Winger

Senior career*
Years	Team	Apps	(Gls)
1947–1948	Clydebank Juniors		
1948–1949	Morton		
1949–1950	Falkirk		
1950–1951	Carlisle United	32	(11)
1951–1953	Grimsby Town	37	(15)
1953–1958	Shrewsbury Town	91	(28)
1958–19??	Hastings United		
- * Club domestic league appearances and goals

Alexander Bain "Alec" McCue (25 November 1927 – 25 October 1989) was a Scottish professional footballer who played as a winger.
