= Andrew Gilfillan =

South African cricketer (born 1959)

Personal information
- Full name: Andrew Douglas Gilfillan
- Born: 21 August 1959 (age 67); Johannesburg, Transvaal, South Africa
- Batting: Right-handed
- Bowling: Leg break

Domestic team information
- Years: Team
- 1982: Oxford University

Career statistics
| Competition | First-class |
|---|---|
| Matches | 3 |
| Runs scored | 40 |
| Batting average | 13.33 |
| 100s/50s | –/– |
| Top score | 31 |
| Balls bowled | 306 |
| Wickets | 2 |
| Bowling average | 109.00 |
| 5 wickets in innings | – |
| 10 wickets in match | – |
| Best bowling | 2/177 |
| Catches/stumpings | –/– |
- Source: Cricinfo, 11 July 2020

Andrew Douglas Gilfillan (born 21 August 1959) is a South African former first-class cricketer.

Gilfillan was born at Johannesburg in August 1959. He later studied in England at Worcester College at the University of Oxford. While studying at Oxford, he played first-class cricket for Oxford University in 1982, making three appearances against Kent, Gloucestershire and Hampshire. He scored 40 runs in his three matches, with a high score of 33, while with his leg break bowling he took 2 wickets, with both coming against Kent with Gilfillan taking the wickets of Neil Taylor and Chris Cowdrey.
