= Hector Gilfillan =

English footballer (1903–1970)

Personal information
- Full name: Hector McDonald Gilfillan
- Date of birth: 26 February 1903
- Place of birth: Winlaton, County Durham, England
- Date of death: q2 1970
- Place of death: County Durham, England
- Height: 5 ft 8 in (1.73 m)
- Position: Outside left

Senior career*
Years	Team	Apps	(Gls)
19??–1927	Workington		
1927–1928	Darlington	7	(0)
- * Club domestic league appearances and goals

Hector McDonald Gilfillan (26 February 1903 – q2 1970) was an English footballer who played as an outside left in the Football League for Darlington and in non-league football for Workington.

== Life and career ==
Gilfillan was born in Winlaton, County Durham, at the time of the 1911 census, youngest child of John Gilfillan and his wife Ann, who kept the Old House Inn in Winlaton.

By early in the 1925–26 season, Gilfillan was playing for Workington in the North Eastern League, scoring against Scotswood and twice against Hartlepools United reserves. In March 1926, he was a reserve for the Northern Counties team selected for a match against a Football Association eleven. The following season, he opened the scoring in Workington's first-round FA Cup match against Crook Town, but his team's overly casual attitude allowed the visitors to make a winning comeback.

Gilfillan signed for Third Division club Darlington in July 1927. He went straight into the first team for the opening match of the season, and kept his place for the next few matches, but played only seven times before leaving the club.

Gilfillan died in County Durham in 1970 at the age of 67. (Note: Gilfillan's death was registered in the second quarter of 1970 in the Durham North Eastern registration district, which covered Boldon, Heworth, Hebburn and Jarrow.)
