= Allen Oliver =

English footballer (1924–2024)

Personal information
- Date of birth: 8 September 1924
- Place of birth: Blyth, England
- Date of death: April 2024 (aged 99)
- Position: Winger

Senior career*
Years	Team	Apps	(Gls)
	Crofton Colliery Welfare	?	(?)
1947–1950	Derby County	16	(2)
1950–1944	Stockport County	139	(29)
1954–1958	Gateshead	146	(36)
1958–19??	Ashington	?	(?)
- * Club domestic league appearances and goals

Joseph Allen Oliver (8 September 1924 – April 2024) was an English footballer who played as a winger.

Oliver started his career with non-league Crofton Colliery Welfare before joining Derby County in 1947. He scored 2 goals in 17 appearances in total for Derby County before joining Stockport County in 1950, where he went on to score 32 goals in 151 league and cup games. Oliver moved on to Gateshead in 1954, making 153 league and cup appearances and scoring 37 goals in 4 years at the club. Oliver then moved to non-league Ashington in 1958.

Oliver died in April 2024, at the age of 99.

== Sources ==
- "allfootballers.com". Archived from the original on 13 January 2010.
- "Post War English & Scottish Football League A–Z Player's Transfer Database".
