= Margaret Sylvia Gilliland =

Australian biochemist (1917–1990)

Margaret Sylvia Gilliland (8 September 1917 – 18 May 1990) was an Australian biochemist, academic and anti-nuclear campaigner.

The daughter of Robert Dugald Bertie and Kathleen Crommelin, she was born Margaret Sylvia Bertie in Grenfell, New South Wales; her uncle Charles Henry Bertie was a librarian and historian. She received a BSc in biochemistry from the University of Melbourne. In 1942, she married Alexander Forbes Gilliland (he died in 1958); the couple had three children. Gilliland later worked as a biochemistry demonstrator at the University of Queensland where she was also an active member of the Queensland Association of University Women. She received a MSc from the university in 1962, with her masters thesis on the metabolism of streptomyces isolated from the soil, and became a lecturer the following year. In 1969, she spent a year studying at the University of California, San Diego, funded by a graduate fellowship provided by the American Association of University Women.

In 1973 Gilliland helped organize an expedition with the Yooringa Protest Group to the Moruroa atoll to protest and attempt to halt French nuclear testing in the Pacific. Gilliand drew national attention for this trip as a protesting grandmother. This expedition was ultimately cancelled due problems with insurance cover. The papers of the Yooringa Protest Group, collected by Gilliland, and her personal papers are available through the University of Queensland Archives.

In 1978, she helped establish a multi-disciplinary program in community health at the master's level for the University of Queensland and served as director for the program. A core aim of this course was aimed at tackling malnutrition in South-east Asia and it was open the post-graduate students from the region with a major component being five months' fieldwork in the Philippines. It later extended its reach to Thailand, Malaysia, Fiji, and parts of Africa.

She retired from the university in 1988. She died at Karana Downs at the age of 72.

== Publications ==
- Gilliland, M. S. (1960). Biochemistry : Laboratory manual for Elementary biochemistry, Biochemistry II and Clinical Biochemistry III. University of Queensland Press.
- Gilliland, M. S. (1962). The metabolic and cultural activities of a streptomyces isolated from soil. The University of Queensland, School of Medicine.
- Gilliland, M. S. (1963). Biochemistry : laboratory manual for Biochemistry II and Clinical Biochemistry III. ([2nd ed.]). University of Queensland Press.
- Gilliland, M.S. & Yooringa Protest Group. (1973). Yooringa Protest Group Ephemera.
- Gilliland, M. S. & Yooringa Protest Group. (1973). Papers relating to Yooringa Protest Group.
