= Jack Parry (Welsh footballer) =

Welsh footballer (1924–2010)

Personal information
- Full name: Brynley John Parry
- Date of birth: 11 January 1924
- Place of birth: Clydach, Wales
- Date of death: 20 January 2010 (aged 86)
- Height: 5 ft 9 in (1.75 m)
- Position: Goalkeeper

Youth career
- Clydach
- 1939: Ynystawe United

Senior career*
Years	Team	Apps	(Gls)
1946–1951	Swansea Town	98	(0)
1951–1955	Ipswich Town	138	(0)
1955–1959	Chelmsford City		
1959–1960	Marconi (Essex)		

International career
1951	Wales	1	(0)
- * Club domestic league appearances and goals

Brynley John Parry (11 January 1924 – 20 January 2010) was a Welsh professional footballer. During his career he made almost 100 appearances for Swansea Town and 138 appearances for Ipswich Town between 1951 and 1955. Born in Wales in 1924, Jack married Edith and had 3 children. In his later years he moved to London and then Chelmsford as a bricklayer. Most notably, Parry 'topped off' the Natwest building in London. Parry had 6 grandchildren and 2 great-grandchildren all living around the Chelmsford area of Essex before his death in 2010.
