= Dai Lawrence =

Welsh footballer

Personal information
- Full name: David William Lawrence
- Date of birth: 18 January 1947
- Place of birth: Swansea, Wales
- Date of death: 21 July 2009 (aged 62)
- Place of death: Swansea, Wales
- Position: Defender

Senior career*
Years	Team	Apps	(Gls)
–1967	Merthyr Tydfil		
1967–1971	Swansea City	97	(2)
1971–1972	Chelmsford City		
- * Club domestic league appearances and goals

David William "Dai" Lawrence (18 January 1947 – 21 July 2009) was a Welsh footballer who spent four seasons as a professional at his hometown club Swansea City in the late 1960s and early 1970s.

Lawrence joined Swansea in May 1967 from non-league Merthyr Tydfil, and was the team's right-back when Swansea were promoted from Division Four in 1969–70.

In 1971, Lawrence was released by Swansea, and he subsequently returned to the non-league game, playing one season for Chelmsford City before an injury forced him to retire from the game. He then moved back to Swansea, where he worked as a carpenter. He died of a suspected heart attack in July 2009, aged 62.
