= Hector Gilliland =

Australian painter

Hector Beaumont Gilliland (1911–2002) was an Australian artist, best known for watercolor landscapes.

Gilliland was born in Tasmania and educated at Sydney Technical High School, living at Leichhardt. In 1930 he started as a survey draftsman for Land Titles, New South Wales Public Service, and was based near the Art Gallery of New South Wales where he frequently visited at lunch. After suffering a bad concussion that prevented him serving in the military, he joined the Commonwealth Public Service in 1942, based in Canberra.

While training as a surveyor and draftsman he was studying art part-time and at night classes. His Summer Morning was purchased by the National Gallery of NSW in 1944 His 1946 watercolors Windy Day, Canberra and Corkhills were noticed by the SMH art critic and given equivocal approval and perhaps the same critic noticed his River Bank in 1947, re-echoing the thought that he had fallen short of Cezanne's "cubist ideals".

Gilliland helped re-establish the Artists' Society of Canberra and was its Secretary and/or President 1945–1952. In 1950 another member, Victor Forstmann had his portrait of Gilliland accepted for Archibald Prize judging. He was a member of the Watercolour Institute from 1944 to at least 1979.

Gilliland began painting his mature body of work, the Saqqara series in 1976 at 65 years of age. This body of work features minimal geometric abstractions that departed from his earlier figurative work and organic abstractions, while maintaining his focus on spatial effects of colour and shape. The series takes its title from the Egyptian city of Saqqara, which Gilliland never visited, but suggested was the imaginative departure point for his investigations: "It began in the sunset of a June day [in 1954] as I stood on the afterdeck of a freighter coming down the Suez Canal, looking to the west across Egypt, imagining what could not be seen[...]I have not been to Saqqara - have only read enough to cause me to marvel at the achievements of such an ancient civilization as the Egyptian - but cannot dissociate the name from what I am attempting to do." According to Gilliland, the role of imagination became fundamental to his practice of art: "I now choose to think that the artist's function is to discover by the act of imagining, to know and to be aware of knowing by the act of imagining; and that the scope of this function is universally limitless"

Gilliland is represented at the National Gallery, Canberra, state galleries of New South Wales, Victoria, South Australia and Western Australia, and many large regional galleries including Newcastle, Launceston, Bendigo and Bathurst.
