= Paul Thompson (footballer, born 1973) =

English footballer

Personal information
- Full name: Paul Derek Zetland Thompson
- Date of birth: 17 April 1973 (age 53)
- Place of birth: Newcastle upon Tyne, England
- Height: 5 ft 11 in (1.80 m)
- Position: Striker

Youth career
- Redheugh Boys Club

Senior career*
Years	Team	Apps	(Gls)
1991–1995	Hartlepool United	56	(9)
1995–1997	Gateshead	80	(23)
1997–1999	Stevenage Borough	21	(2)
1999	→ Gateshead (loan)	7	(2)
1999–2004	Gateshead	163	(46)
2004	Bishop Auckland	5	(2)
2004	Blyth Spartans		
2004–2005	Whitley Bay	13	(4)
2005–2008	Gateshead	100	(17)
- * Club domestic league appearances and goals

Paul Derek Zetland Thompson (born 17 April 1973) is an English retired footballer who played as a striker.

Thompson started his career with Redheugh Boys Club before signing for Hartlepool United in 1991. Thompson moved to non-league Gateshead in 1995, where he became the club's record goalscorer, scoring 130 goals in 439 total appearances during four stints at the club. He also had spells with Stevenage Borough, Bishop Auckland, Blyth Spartans & Whitley Bay.

From 2007 to 2010, Thompson was a coach at Gateshead, but left after the 2009–10 season as he was unable to commit to a full-time role for the following season.

== Sources ==
- "Paul Thompson – In The Mad Crowd, a Hartlepool United resource". Archived from the original on 3 July 2009.
- "Unofficial Gateshead Football Club Statistics Database". Archived from the original on 22 April 2010.
