= George Jones (footballer, born 1930) =

Welsh footballer

Personal information
- Date of birth: 19 July 1930
- Place of birth: Wrexham, Wales
- Date of death: June 2017 (aged 86)
- Place of death: Wrexham, Wales
- Position: Wing half

Youth career
- Bersham RBL

Senior career*
Years	Team	Apps	(Gls)
1950–1954	Wrexham	113	(5)
- Oswestry Town
- * Club domestic league appearances and goals

George Jones ( 19 July 1930 – June 2017) was a Welsh former professional footballer who played as a wing-half. He made over 100 appearances in the English Football League for Welsh club Wrexham in the 1950s.
