= Bennett Steele =

English footballer

Personal information
- Full name: Bennett John Stanley Steele
- Date of birth: 5 August 1939 (age 87)
- Place of birth: Cramlington, England
- Position: Left winger

Senior career*
Years	Team	Apps	(Gls)
1957–1958	Everton	0	(0)
1958–1959	Chesterfield	18	(1)
1959–1968	Gateshead	25	(5)
1968-1969	Bradford City	0	(0)
1969–1977	Farsley Celtic	?	(?)
Total		43	(6)
- * Club domestic league appearances and goals

Bennett John Stanley Steele (born 5 August 1939) is an English former professional footballer who played as a left winger in the Football League.

== Sources ==
- Bennett Steele at Post War English & Scottish Football League A–Z Player's Transfer Database
- Turnbull, Albert (2015). Gateshead Football History 1890-2015.
