= Charlie Timmins =

English footballer (1922–2010)

Personal information
- Date of birth: 29 May 1922
- Place of birth: Birmingham, England
- Date of death: 13 April 2010 (aged 87)
- Place of death: Birmingham, England
- Height: 5 ft 10 in (1.78 m)
- Position: Full back

Senior career*
| Years | Team | Apps | (Gls) |
| 1948–1959 | Coventry City | 161 | (5) |
- * Club domestic league appearances and goals

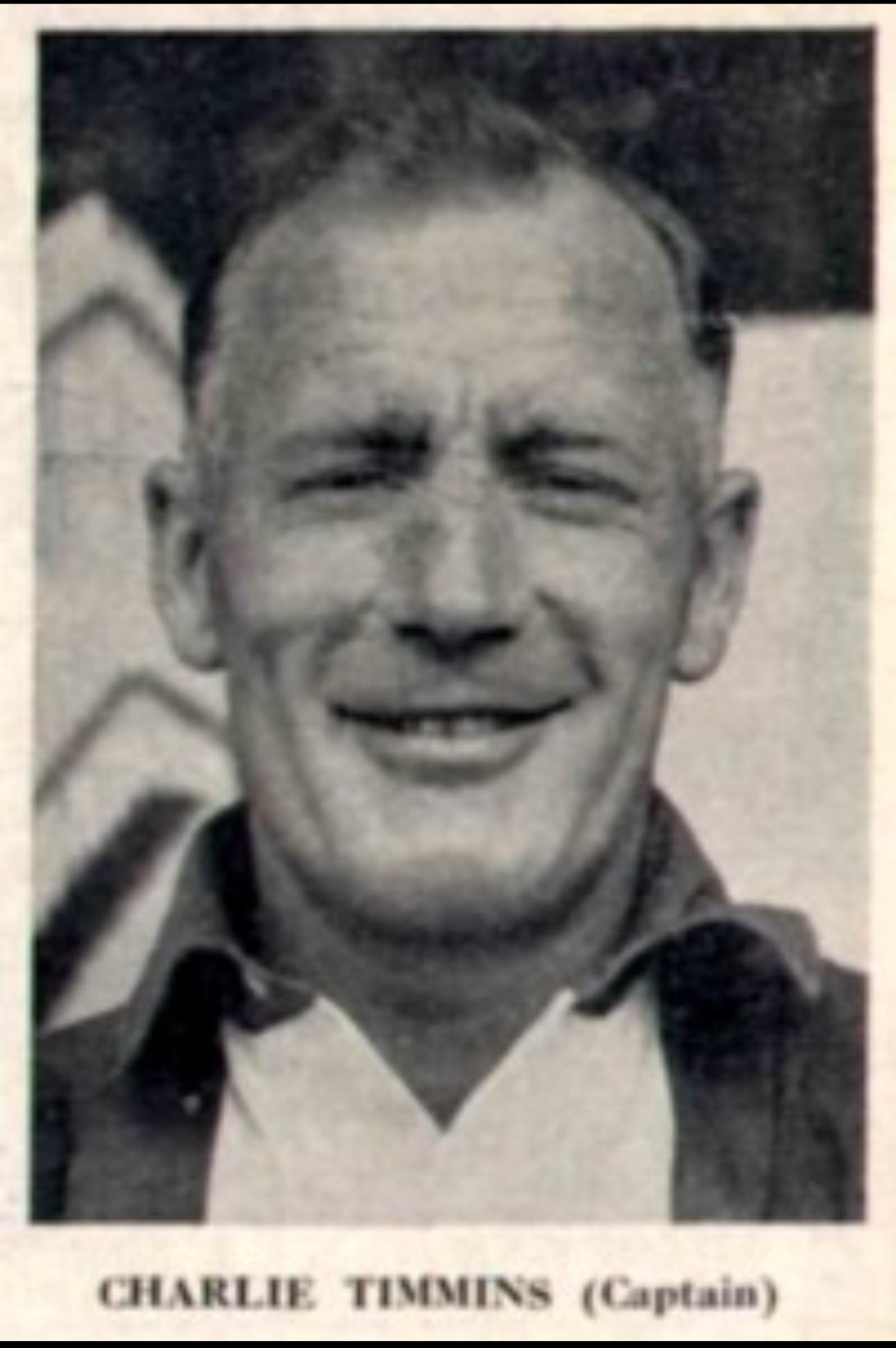

Charles Timmins (29 May 1922 – 13 April 2010) was an English professional footballer who played as a full back. He spent eleven years with Coventry City where he was Club Captain making 165 first-team appearances, including 161 in the Football League, and scoring five goals.

Timmins was born in Birmingham. Before the Second World War, he had been registered with Birmingham City, but his early football career was interrupted by wartime service.

Timmins served in the British Army throughout the Second World War as a vehicular driver with the 4th Field Squadron, Royal Engineers.

Stationed in France, Holland and Germany, he transported sappers, equipment and supplies in support of battlefield engineering operations, including bridge construction, mine clearance and maintaining vital routes for advancing Allied forces, before returning to civilian life in 1946.

After the war, Timmins returned to work in Birmingham’s motor industry. He worked at Morris and played local non-League football for Jack Moulds Athletic. By the late 1940s he believed his chance of becoming a professional footballer had passed. In 1948, Coventry City manager Harry Storer arrived unexpectedly at the Timmins family home and persuaded him to sign for Coventry City.

Timmins initially appeared for Coventry’s reserve side before making his Football League debut away to Luton Town on 24 August 1949. Coventry lost 2–0, but Storer was impressed with his performance and Timmins went on to make 23 appearances during the 1949–50 season. He played at both right back and left back and helped Coventry finish the campaign strongly, with an eight-match unbeaten run.

The 1950–51 season became one of Timmins’ most significant campaigns. He made 33 league appearances as Coventry competed near the top of the Second Division before finishing seventh. Coventry’s strong form included a 6–1 win over Blackburn Rovers, which took the club to the top of Division Two. Timmins later recalled the match in detail when speaking to Coventry City historian Jim Brown.

During his Coventry career, Timmins was the club captain and played under six managers: Harry Storer, Jack Fairbrother, Jesse Carver, George Raynor, Harry Warren and Billy Frith.

During the mid-1950s, Timmins established a reputation as one of the leading full-backs playing outside the First Division. His performances brought speculation that he might receive international recognition, particularly following the emergence of Coventry City goalkeeper Reg Matthews as an England player.

Timmins also attracted interest from clubs at a higher level, with Newcastle United and Celtic among those reported to have considered signing him.

Timmins became known for his consistency, positional reliability and strong tackling. Rover News later described him as a former Coventry City player known for his “fearsome tackling”, while Coventry sources remembered him as a stalwart full back of the 1950s.

One of Timmins’ clearest later recollections concerned a friendly against Preston North End at Highfield Road in January 1956, when he faced Tom Finney. Timmins remembered Finney’s pace, movement and ability on either foot, later joking that he was so tired by half-time that manager George Raynor switched the full backs to give him a rest.

Timmins remained a senior figure for Coventry City during the club’s post-war years, providing experience, consistency as well as leadership at full back. His time at Highfield Road had covered a significant period in the club’s development, during which he became a respected senior player and one of Coventry’s most reliable performers.

In total, Timmins made 165 first-team appearances for Coventry City between 1949 and 1958. These included 63 appearances in the Second Division, 98 in the Third Division South and four in the FA Cup. He played 14,850 first-team minutes for the club and scored five goals.

All five of Timmins’ Coventry goals came during the 1950s. His recorded goals included penalties against Millwall, Norwich City, Swindon Town and Exeter City. He also missed one penalty, against Southend United in October 1957. His only goal from open play was scored on 24 December 1955 in Coventry’s 5–3 win over Norwich City at Highfield Road. His final Coventry appearance came in a 0–0 draw against Brentford on 8 February 1958.

Timmins travelled daily from Birmingham to Coventry for training, often using the Midland Red 159 bus with other Birmingham-based Coventry players, including George Mason, Martin McDonnell, Gordon Nutt and Don Dorman. He later recalled that few players could afford cars at the time and that the group enjoyed the daily journey together.

In 1959, aged 36, Timmins left Coventry City and joined Lockheed Leamington, where he played under former Coventry colleague Les Latham. He later coached Evesham United before retiring from football.

Following his playing career, Timmins returned to the motor industry. He joined Rover at Solihull, working in the car despatch division, and remained with the company for 28 years before retiring in 1986. He also remained active in works football and captained the Rover works team. Rover News reported in 1961 that he had also captained the Birmingham Works A.F.A. side.

In later life, Timmins remained closely associated with Coventry City. He became a longstanding member and supporter of the Coventry City Former Players Association and was a regular visitor to Coventry home matches, Legends Days and the Legends Lounge. Jim Brown recalled giving Timmins and his family a tour of the Ricoh Arena, during which Timmins reminisced about his years at Highfield Road and recalled matches and teammates from more than 50 years earlier.

Timmins died at Queen Elizabeth Hospital, Birmingham, on 13 April 2010, aged 87, after cancer. His funeral took place at Yardley Crematorium on 21 April 2010. Former Coventry players and association representatives attended, including Lol Harvey, Brian Nicholas, Peter Wyer, Bob Wesson, Ron Farmer, Bob Bromage and Jim Cox.

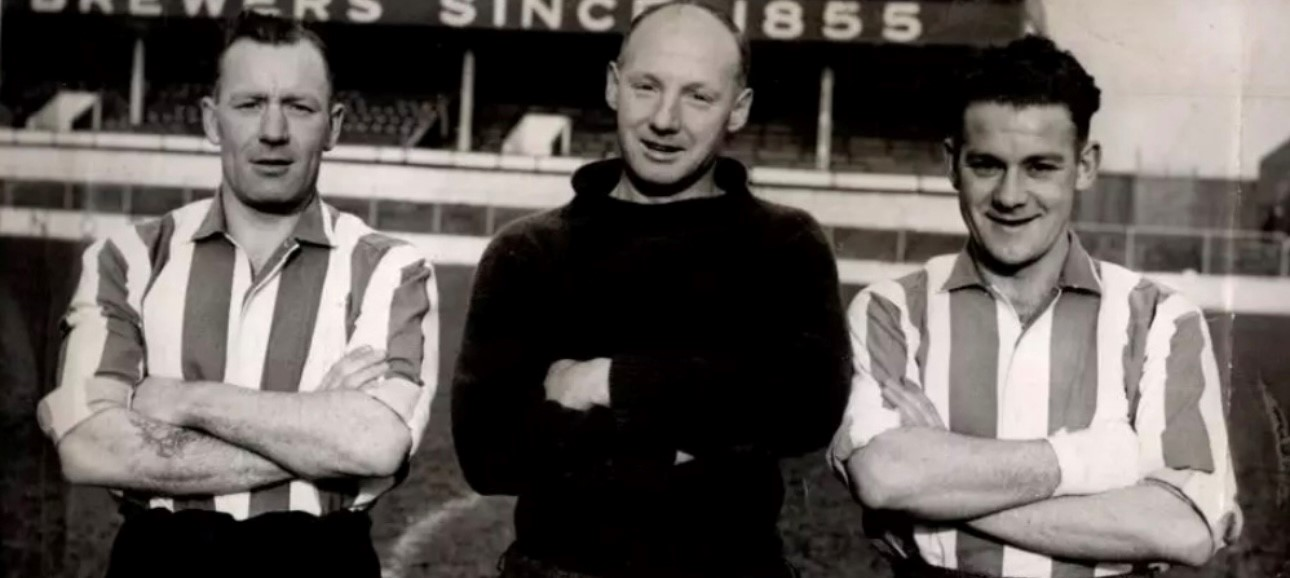
Charlie Timmins, Alf Wood and Dick Mason of Coventry City
