= Gilfillan Lake =

Lake in the state of Minnesota, United States

- Location within Minnesota
- Location: Ramsey County, Minnesota
- Coordinates: 45°5′3″N 93°4′46″W
- Type: lake

Gilfillan Lake is a lake in Ramsey County, in the U.S. state of Minnesota.

Gilfillan Lake was named for Charles D. Gilfillan.

== See also ==
- List of lakes in Minnesota
