= Ian Wilson (footballer, born 1923) =

Scottish footballer (1923–1989)

Personal information
- Full name: John Grieve Wilson
- Date of birth: 11 February 1923
- Place of birth: Kennoway, Fife, Scotland
- Date of death: 5 November 1989 (aged 66)
- Place of death: Coquitlam, British Columbia, Canada
- Position: Winger

Senior career*
Years	Team	Apps	(Gls)
19xx–1946	Forfar Athletic	?	(?)
1946–1948	Preston North End	16	(6)
1948–1950	Burnley	19	(1)
1950–1951	Leicester City	12	(2)
1951–1953	Chesterfield	77	(18)
1953–1956	Rotherham United	108	(45)
1956–1957	Boston United	20	(8)
- * Club domestic league appearances and goals

John Grieve "Ian" Wilson (11 February 1923 – 5 November 1989) was a Scottish professional footballer who played as a winger.

Wilson started his career with Forfar Athletic before moving to England to join Preston North End in 1946. Wilson scored six goals in 16 league appearances before moving to Burnley in June 1948. He made his debut for the club in the 0–1 defeat to Portsmouth on 28 August 1948. In the 1–0 win against Everton on 2 October 1948, Wilson scored his only goal for Burnley. He played his 19th and last game for the club in the 1–2 loss away at Manchester United on 4 February 1950.

Wilson signed for Leicester City in March 1950 and scored twice in 12 league appearances before leaving to join Chesterfield the following year. He spent several years in lower-league football with Chesterfield and Rotherham United, before ending his career in semi-professional football with Boston United.
