= Gilliland's Ranch =

Ranch and UFO Investigation Center in Washington, U.S.

- Gilliland's Ranch location in Washington state.
- Location: Trout Lake, Washington
- Coordinates: 45.988°N 121.494°W
- Season: June 5 – September 8
- Owner: James Gilliland
- Website: eceti.org

Gilliland's Ranch, also known as Gilliland Ranch, Gilliland's ECETI Ranch, and Sattva Sanctuary, is an area of land in Trout Lake, at the base of Mount Adams, in Southwest Washington. The property belongs to James Gilliland, who claims to have established Enlightened Contact with ExtraTerrestrial Intelligence (ECETI) and the Self-Mastery Earth Institute in 1986, and has hosted unidentified flying object (UFO) sighting events since 2003. Gilliland reports frequent UFO sightings and "unexplained light shows" on site.
