= Bob Baldridge =

English footballer (1932–2014)

Personal information
- Full name: Robert William Baldridge
- Date of birth: 26 November 1932
- Place of birth: Sunderland, England
- Date of death: 2014 (aged 81)
- Place of death: Sunderland, England
- Position: Centre forward

Senior career*
Years	Team	Apps	(Gls)
19??–1957	Hendon Social	?	(?)
1957–1960	Gateshead	59	(22)
1960–19??	South Shields	?	(?)
- * Club domestic league appearances and goals

Robert William Baldridge (26 November 1932 – 2014) was an English footballer who played as a centre forward.

Baldridge started his career with non-league Hendon Social before signing for Gateshead in February 1957. He scored a total of 23 goals in 61 appearances in the league and FA Cup for Gateshead. Baldridge then went on to play non-league football for South Shields.

Baldridge died in Sunderland in 2014, at the age of 81.

== Sources ==
- "allfootballers.com".
- "Post War English & Scottish Football League A–Z Player's Transfer Database".
