= Ray Haddington =

English footballer (1923–1994)

Personal information
- Full name: William Raymond Haddington
- Date of birth: 18 November 1923
- Place of birth: Bradford, England
- Date of death: 26 July 1994 (aged 70)
- Place of death: Adelaide, Australia
- Position: Inside forward

Youth career
- Bradford Park Avenue
- 1946–1947: Bradford City

Senior career*
| Years | Team | Apps | (Gls) |
| 1947–1951 | Oldham Athletic | 117 | (63) |
| 1951 | Manchester City | 6 | (4) |
| 1951–1952 | Stockport County | 11 | (4) |
| 1952 | Bournemouth | 2 | (0) |
| 1952–1954 | Rochdale | 38 | (12) |
| 1954 | Halifax Town | 8 | (0) |
- Bedford Town
| Total | | 182 | (83) |
- * Club domestic league appearances and goals

Ray Haddington (1923 – 1994) was a footballer who played as an inside forward in the Football League for Oldham Athletic, Manchester City, Stockport County, Bournemouth, Rochdale and Halifax Town.
