= John Ingham (footballer) =

English footballer

Personal information
- Full name: Robert John Ingham
- Date of birth: 18 October 1924
- Place of birth: Hebburn, England
- Date of death: 6 May 2000 (aged 75)
- Place of death: Newcastle upon Tyne, England
- Position: Winger

Senior career*
Years	Team	Apps	(Gls)
1945–1947	Newburn		
1947–1958	Gateshead	430	(109)
1958–1961	North Shields		
1961–1964	Gateshead	58	(21)
- * Club domestic league appearances and goals

Robert John Ingham (18 October 1924 – 6 May 2000) was an English footballer who played as a winger. He scored 109 goals from 430 appearances in the Football League for Gateshead. He also played non-league football for Newburn and North Shields.

== Career ==
Ingham started his career with non-league Wallsend St. Lukes and signed amateur forms for Gateshead when he was aged 14, in 1938. He played for Gateshead reserves and Newburn before signing for Gateshead in August 1947. He scored a total of 119 goals in 468 appearances in the league and FA Cup and DSP cups for Gateshead before moving on to non-league North Shields in 1958. He returned to Gateshead from 1961 to 1964, while Jack Fairbrother and Bobby Mitchell were managers. He played a further 58 games scoring 21 goals. His overall record of 526 games and 140 goals still stand.

== Sources ==
- "allfootballers.com".
