= Reg Scotson =

English footballer

Personal information
- Full name: Reginald Scotson
- Date of birth: 22 September 1919
- Place of birth: Stockton-on-Tees, England
- Date of death: 1999 (aged 79–80)
- Position: Wing half

Youth career
- 1938–1939: Ouston Juniors

Senior career*
Years	Team	Apps	(Gls)
1939–1950	Sunderland	61	(1)
1950–1955	Grimsby Town	164	(4)
1955–195?	Skegness Town		
- * Club domestic league appearances and goals

Reginald Scotson (22 September 1919 – 1999) was an English professional footballer who played as a wing half.
