= Keith Kettleborough =

English footballer and manager

Keith Frank Kettleborough
Personal information
- Date of birth: 29 June 1935
- Place of birth: Rotherham, England
- Date of death: 2 November 2009 (aged 74)
- Position: Inside forward

Youth career
- Rotherham YMCA

Senior career*
Years	Team	Apps	(Gls)
1955–1960	Rotherham United	118	(40)
1960–1965	Sheffield United	154	(65)
1965–1966	Newcastle United	30	(17)
1966–1967	Doncaster Rovers	35	(21)
1967–1968	Chesterfield	66	(20)
Total		403	(163)

Managerial career
- 1966–1967: Doncaster Rovers
- * Club domestic league appearances and goals

Keith Frank Kettleborough (29 June 1935 – 2 November 2009) was an English professional footballer born in Rotherham, Yorkshire, who made more than 400 appearances in the Football League playing for Rotherham United, Sheffield United, Newcastle United, Doncaster Rovers and Chesterfield.

Kettleborough started his football career with Rotherham Y.M.C.A. and after a trial with Grimsby Town he turned professional with his home town club of Rotherham United, for whom he made his debut during the 1955–56 season. It took him two years to win a regular place at inside forward.

Sheffield United signed him in December 1960, but it was not until the following season that he earned a regular place in the first team. In five years with the Blades in the First Division he made 154 league appearances and scored 65 goals. In December 1965, he signed for Newcastle United, but only made 30 starts for the Magpies before transferring to Doncaster Rovers a year later, where he spent a short time as manager. In November 1967, he joined Chesterfield where he completed his Football League career.

Kettleborough died on 2 November 2009 in Rotherham. A minute's applause was observed before that day's match between Sheffield United and Newcastle United.
