= Jackie Newton =

English footballer

Personal information
- Full name: John Laws Newton
- Date of birth: 25 May 1925
- Place of birth: Bishop Auckland, England
- Date of death: 30 January 2010 (aged 84)
- Position: Wing-half

Senior career*
Years	Team	Apps	(Gls)
1944–1946	Newcastle United	0	(0)
1946–1958	Hartlepools United	332	(15)
Total		332	(15)
- * Club domestic league appearances and goals

John Laws Newton (25 May 1925 – 30 January 2010) was an English footballer who played as a wing-half for Hartlepools United from 1946 to 1958.

Newton began his career at Newcastle United, where he signed in 1944, never played for the Magpies in any official competition. He had guested for Hartlepools United during the war, and joined the Pools permanently in May 1946. He made his official debut for the club on 2 November 1946 against Halifax Town, and a regular in the Hartlepools side for the nest twelve seasons.

He left Hartlepools in 1958 having made 361 appearances and scored 19 times, making him Hartlepool United's 11th highest appearance maker in the club's history. He later had a brief spell with non-League Ashington, before retiring from football to become a toolmaker. He died, aged 84, on 30 January 2010.

== Career statistics ==
All appearances made by Jackie Newton:

Appearances and goals by club, season and competition
Club	Season	League			FA Cup		Total	
Club	Season	Division	Apps	Goals	Apps	Goals	Apps	Goals
Hartlepools United	1946–47	Third Division North	6	0	0	0	6	0
Hartlepools United	1947–48	Third Division North	3	0	0	0	3	0
Hartlepools United	1948–49	Third Division North	14	0	1	0	15	0
Hartlepools United	1949–50	Third Division North	36	2	3	0	39	2
Hartlepools United	1950–51	Third Division North	39	2	2	0	41	2
Hartlepools United	1951–52	Third Division North	35	3	3	0	38	1
Hartlepools United	1952–53	Third Division North	39	2	2	0	41	2
Hartlepools United	1953–54	Third Division North	30	0	5	0	35	0
Hartlepools United	1954–55	Third Division North	45	1	7	2	52	3
Hartlepools United	1955–56	Third Division North	38	0	3	0	41	0
Hartlepools United	1956–57	Third Division North	27	3	2	1	29	3
Hartlepools United	1957–58	Third Division North	20	2	1	1	21	3
Career total			332	15	29	4	361	19
