= George Wilbert =

English footballer

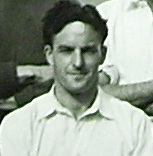

Personal information
- Full name: George Norman Wilbert
- Date of birth: 11 July 1924
- Place of birth: Dunston, England
- Date of death: 10 September 1993 (aged 69)
- Place of death: Alnwick, England
- Position: Centre forward

Senior career*
Years	Team	Apps	(Gls)
1941–1955	Gateshead	312	(109)
- * Club domestic league appearances and goals

George Norman Wilbert (11 July 1924 – 10 September 1993) was an English footballer who played as a centre forward.

He played his entire career for Gateshead, originally signing on 1 August 1942 from Tottenham Hotspur while serving in the Royal Air Force. At the time, he was a fast, goal-scoring left winger.

Wartime service restricted his appearances to 43 games and 14 goals, until the 1947–48 season, when he was demobbed and became Gateshead's regular centre forward. He played at Redheugh Park in the heyday of Gateshead's FA Cup runs, notably in 1952 and 1953 when they reached the fourth and sixth rounds, but was missing through injury for the game against Bolton Wanderers in 1953 when Gateshead lost only to a disputed Nat Lofthouse goal. Bolton went on to play at Wembley in the famous Matthews final.

It was said at the time that if Wilbert had played, history may well have been different as he had played brilliantly in the previous rounds, particularly in the fifth against Plymouth Argyle, which Gateshead won 1–0.

He left Gateshead in the 1954–55 season to work for the Forestry Commission in Northumberland.

He scored a total of 97 goals in 285 appearances in the league and FA Cup.

== Sources ==
- "allfootballers.com". Archived from the original on 5 April 2010.
- Newcastle Football Pink
