= Charlie Hogan =

English footballer

Personal information
- Full name: Charles Hogan
- Date of birth: 23 April 1926
- Place of birth: Bury, England
- Date of death: 25 October 1992 (aged 66)
- Place of death: Arnhem, Netherlands
- Position: Right wing

Senior career*
Years	Team	Apps	(Gls)
1947–1948	Bury	1	(0)
1949–1951	Accrington Stanley	56	(4)
1951–1952	Southport	9	(1)
1952–1953	Rochdale	3	(0)
1953–1954	Wigan Athletic	4	(0)
Total		73	(5)
- * Club domestic league appearances and goals

Charles Hogan (23 April 1926 – 25 October 1992) was an English professional footballer who played as a right winger in the Football League for Bury, Accrington Stanley, Southport and Rochdale. He also played for Lancashire Combination side Wigan Athletic, making four league appearances during the 1953–54 season. He was married and had four children: Elizabeth, John, Carmel and Simon.
