= Ken Smith (footballer, born 1927) =

English footballer (1927–2018)

Personal information
- Full name: Kenneth Smith
- Date of birth: 7 December 1927
- Place of birth: Consett, England
- Date of death: 6 December 2018 (aged 90)
- Position: Inside forward

Senior career*
| Years | Team | Apps | (Gls) |
| 19??–1949 | Annfield Plain | | |
| 1949–1952 | Blackpool | 0 | (0) |
| 1952–1959 | Gateshead | 256 | (75) |
| 1959–19?? | Ashington | | |
- * Club domestic league appearances and goals

Kenneth Smith (7 December 1927 – 6 December 2018) was an English footballer who played as an inside forward.

Smith started his career with non-league Annfield Plain before signing for Blackpool in April 1949. Without making a first team appearance, Smith moved to Gateshead in August 1952. He scored a total of 79 goals in 269 appearances in league and cup competitions for Gateshead between 1952 and 1959. Smith later played non-League football with Ashington. He died on 6 December 2018, at the age of 90.
