= Robert Gilfillan =

Scottish poet and songwriter (1798–1850)

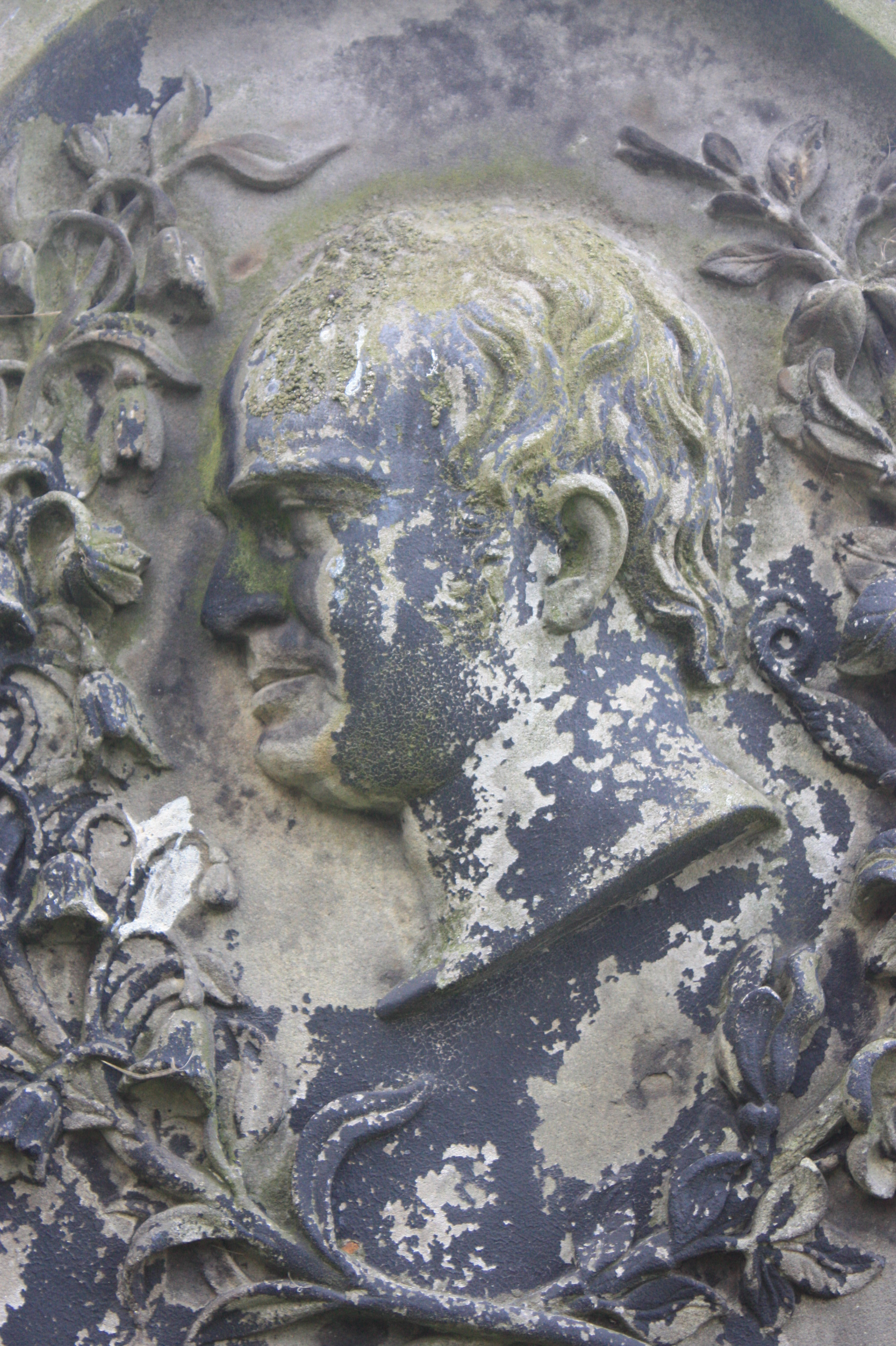
Robert Gilfillan as shown on his grave, South Leith Parish Church

Robert Gilfillan (7 July 1798 – 4 December 1850) was a Scottish poet and songwriter.

== Life ==
He was born in Dunfermline in Fife, Scotland, the son of Robert Gilfillan (died 1834), a master weaver, and his wife, Marion Law. In 1811 the family moved to Leith. Around 1812/13 he was apprenticed as a cooper to John Thomson of Peatnook in Leith. In 1818 he returned to Dunfermline to work as a grocer. He returned to Leith in 1821 and worked in various warehouses and wine stores.

His connection with Dunfermline was by no means severed as it was in the town’s Masonic Lodge, Lodge St. John, No. 26 that he was initiated into Freemasonry in December 1821 and, like Robert Burns, he did so before he became famous.

He contributed to Blackwood's Magazine and Noctes Ambrosianae he also represented the Scotman newspaper in Leith.

From 1837 he was a collector of the police rates at Leith, based at Leith Town Hall (now Leith Police Station).

In April 1850 he organised the restoration of the memorial to Robert Fergusson in Canongate Kirkyard on the Royal Mile.

He died of apoplexy at his home in East Hermitage on Leith Links where he lived with his niece, Marion Gilfillan. He is buried in South Leith Parish Churchyard, just south-east of the church.

== Publications ==
- Original Songs (1831) 150-page book of songs
- Songs (1835) second edition adding 50 songs
- Songs (1839) third edition adding 60 further songs

Noteworthy poems include The Exile's song and The Happy Days of Youth.
