= Bobby Gilfillan (footballer, born 1938) =

Scottish footballer

Personal information
- Full name: Robert Inglis Gilfillan
- Date of birth: 29 June 1938
- Place of birth: Cowdenbeath, Scotland
- Date of death: 8 November 2012 (aged 74)
- Place of death: Perth, Scotland
- Position: Striker

Youth career
- Cowdenbeath Royals

Senior career*
Years	Team	Apps	(Gls)
1956–1959	Cowdenbeath	81	(48)
1959–1960	Newcastle United	7	(2)
1960–1961	St Johnstone	14	(6)
1961–1963	Raith Rovers	22	(3)
1963–1966	Southend United	66	(33)
1966–1971	Doncaster Rovers	186	(33)
- Northwich Victoria
Total		376	(126)
- * Club domestic league appearances and goals

Robert Inglis Gilfillan (29 June 1938 – 8 November 2012) was a Scottish professional footballer who played as a striker.

== Career ==
Born in Cowdenbeath, Gilfillan played for Cowdenbeath Royals, Cowdenbeath, Newcastle United, St Johnstone, Raith Rovers, Southend United, Doncaster Rovers and Northwich Victoria.
