= Bobby Gilfillan (footballer, born 1926) =

Scottish footballer (1926–2018)

Personal information
- Full name: Robert Gilfillan
- Date of birth: 14 March 1926
- Place of birth: Dunfermline, Scotland
- Date of death: June 2018 (aged 92)
- Place of death: Bath, England
- Position: Inside forward

Youth career
- Jeanfield Swifts

Senior career*
| Years | Team | Apps | (Gls) |
| 1947–1949 | Blackpool | 0 | (0) |
| 1949–1951 | Cowdenbeath | 33 | (16) |
| 1951–1954 | Rochdale | 62 | (11) |
- Worcester City
| Total | | 95 | (27) |
- * Club domestic league appearances and goals

Robert Gilfillan (14 March 1926 – June 2018) was a Scottish professional footballer who played as an inside forward.

== Career ==
Born in Dunfermline, Gilfillan played for Jeanfield Swifts, Blackpool, Cowdenbeath, Rochdale and Worcester City.
