= 1947–48 Rochdale A.F.C. season =

English football club season

Rochdale
1947–48 season
- Manager: Ted Goodier
- Stadium: Spotland Stadium
- Division 3 North: 12th
- F.A. Cup: 2nd Round
- Top goalscorer: League: Hugh O'Donnell; All: Hugh O'Donnell
Home colours

The 1947–48 season was Rochdale A.F.C's 41st in existence and their 20th in the Football League Third Division North.

== Squad Statistics ==
=== Appearances and goals ===
No.	Pos	Nat	Player	Total		Division 3 North		F.A. Cup	
No.	Pos	Nat	Player	Apps	Goals	Apps	Goals	Apps	Goals
	GK	(England) ENG	Charlie Briggs	8	0	8	0	0	0
	DF	(England) ENG	Len Jackson	37	0	34	0	3	0
	DF	(England) ENG	Norman Kirkman	17	0	17	0	0	0
	MF	(England) ENG	Eric Wood	37	5	34	5	3	0
	DF	(England) ENG	Wally Birch	44	2	41	1	3	1
	DF	(England) ENG	Austin Collier	3	0	3	0	0	0
	MF	(England) ENG	Jackie Arthur	27	6	24	6	3	0
	FW	(England) ENG	Tommy Barkas	8	0	8	0	0	0
	FW	(England) ENG	Joe Hargreaves	5	1	5	1	0	0
	FW	(England) ENG	Jackie Moss	21	4	20	4	1	0
	MF	(Scotland) SCO	Hugh O'Donnell	28	10	26	9	2	1
	MF	(England) ENG	Cyril Lawrence	24	2	24	2	0	0
	MF	(Wales) WAL	Joe McCormick	34	0	31	0	3	0
	FW	(England) ENG	Dick Withington	35	6	32	6	3	0
	GK	(Wales) WAL	Bill Roberts	20	0	17	0	3	0
	MF	(Wales) WAL	Tom Sibley	15	1	13	1	2	0
	MF	(England) ENG	Alan Moorhouse	7	1	7	1	0	0
	DF	(England) ENG	Bill Byrom	24	0	21	0	3	0
	FW	(England) ENG	Sam Earl	6	1	4	1	2	0
	GK	(Australia) AUS	Wally Cornock	1	0	1	0	0	0
	GK	(England) ENG	Les Bywater	12	0	12	0	0	0
	FW	(Scotland) SCO	Ron Johnston	19	7	17	7	2	0
	MF	(England) ENG	Jimmy Britton	18	0	18	0	0	0
	FW	(England) ENG	Charlie Longdon	2	0	2	0	0	0
	DF	(England) ENG	Ron Rothwell	9	0	9	0	0	0
	MF	(England) ENG	Don Partridge	13	0	13	0	0	0
	GK	(Scotland) SCO	Alex Anderson	4	0	4	0	0	0
	FW	(Northern Ireland) NIR	Con Gallacher	6	1	6	1	0	0
	MF	(Scotland) SCO	David Reid	4	1	4	1	0	0
	FW	(England) ENG	Jack Livesey	3	1	3	1	0	0
	FW	(England) ENG	Jack Brindle	1	0	1	0	0	0
	FW	(Scotland) SCO	Hugh Colvan	1	0	1	0	0	0
	DF	(Scotland) SCO	Eddie Anderson	1	0	1	0	0	0
	DF	(Scotland) SCO	Mike Skivington	1	0	1	0	0	0

Squad Statistics (Non-competitive)

=== Appearances and goals (Non-competitive) ===
No.	Pos	Nat	Player	Total		Lancashire Cup	
No.	Pos	Nat	Player	Apps	Goals	Apps	Goals
	GK	(England) ENG	Charlie Briggs	1	0	1	0
	DF	(England) ENG	Len Jackson	2	0	2	0
	DF	(England) ENG	Norman Kirkman	2	0	2	0
	MF	(England) ENG	Eric Wood	2	0	2	0
	DF	(England) ENG	Wally Birch	1	0	1	0
	DF	(England) ENG	Austin Collier	0	0	0	0
	MF	(England) ENG	Jackie Arthur	1	0	1	0
	FW	(England) ENG	Tommy Barkas	2	1	2	1
	FW	(England) ENG	Joe Hargreaves	0	0	0	0
	FW	(England) ENG	Jackie Moss	1	0	1	0
	MF	(Scotland) SCO	Hugh O'Donnell	2	1	2	1
	MF	(England) ENG	Cyril Lawrence	1	0	1	0
	MF	(Wales) WAL	Joe McCormick	2	0	2	0
	FW	(England) ENG	Dick Withington	2	1	2	1
	GK	(Wales) WAL	Bill Roberts	1	0	1	0
	MF	(Wales) WAL	Tom Sibley	1	0	1	0
	MF	(England) ENG	Alan Moorhouse	0	0	0	0
	DF	(England) ENG	Bill Byrom	0	0	0	0
	FW	(England) ENG	Sam Earl	0	0	0	0
	GK	(Australia) AUS	Wally Cornock	0	0	0	0
	GK	(England) ENG	Les Bywater	0	0	0	0
	FW	(Scotland) SCO	Ron Johnston	0	0	0	0
	MF	(England) ENG	Jimmy Britton	0	0	0	0
	FW	(England) ENG	Charlie Longdon	0	0	0	0
	DF	(England) ENG	Ron Rothwell	0	0	0	0
	MF	(England) ENG	Don Partridge	1	0	1	0
	GK	(Scotland) SCO	Alex Anderson	0	0	0	0
	FW	(Northern Ireland) NIR	Con Gallacher	0	0	0	0
	MF	(Scotland) SCO	David Reid	0	0	0	0
	FW	(England) ENG	Jack Livesey	0	0	0	0
	FW	(England) ENG	Jack Brindle	0	0	0	0
	FW	(Scotland) SCO	Hugh Colvan	0	0	0	0
	DF	(Scotland) SCO	Eddie Anderson	0	0	0	0
	DF	(Scotland) SCO	Mike Skivington	0	0	0	0

== Final league table ==
Pos	Team	Pld	W	D	L	GF	GA	GAv	Pts
10	Crewe Alexandra	42	18	7	17	61	63	0.968	43
11	Oldham Athletic	42	14	13	15	63	64	0.984	41
12	Rochdale	42	15	11	16	48	72	0.667	41
13	York City	42	13	14	15	65	60	1.083	40
14	Bradford City	42	15	10	17	65	66	0.985	40

Source: rsssf.com

== Competitions ==
=== Football League Third Division North ===
23 August 1947 1	Rochdale	2–2	Barrow	Rochdale
	Arthur; Hargreaves	Report	Burnett; Kendall	Stadium: Spotland Stadium; Attendance: 9210

28 August 1947 2	Hull City	0–0	Rochdale	Hull
		Report		Stadium: Boothferry Park; Attendance: 25525

30 August 1947 3	Wrexham	5–1	Rochdale	Wrexham
	Benyon; Tunnicliffe; Boothway	Report	Wood	Stadium: Racecourse Ground; Attendance: 9926

2 September 1947 4	Rochdale	1–0	Hull City	Rochdale
	Moss	Report		Stadium: Spotland Stadium; Attendance: 9027

6 September 1947 5	Rochdale	2–1	Halifax Town	Rochdale
	Moss; Withington	Report	Fisher	Stadium: Spotland Stadium; Attendance: 10868

9 September 1947 6	Rochdale	1–3	Accrington Stanley	Rochdale
	Birch (pen.)	Report	Mercer; Rothwell	Stadium: Spotland Stadium; Attendance: 8551

13 September 1947 7	Oldham Athletic	1–1	Rochdale	Oldham
	Bowden	Report	Withington	Stadium: Boundary Park; Attendance: 15310

20 September 1947 8	New Brighton	0–0	Rochdale	New Brighton
		Report		Stadium: Tower Athletic Ground; Attendance: 7135

27 September 1947 9	Rochdale	2–1	Southport	Rochdale
	Moss; Arthur	Report	Heslop	Stadium: Spotland Stadium; Attendance: 8213

4 October 1947 10	Lincoln City	3–0	Rochdale	Lincoln
	McCormick; Hutchinson (pen.)	Report		Stadium: Sincil Bank; Attendance: 12246

11 October 1947 11	Rochdale	3–0	York City	Rochdale
	O'Donnell; Sibley	Report		Stadium: Spotland Stadium; Attendance: 8743

18 October 1947 12	Mansfield Town	1–1	Rochdale	Mansfield
	Oscroft	Report	O'Donnell	Stadium: Field Mill; Attendance: 12268

25 October 1947 13	Rochdale	2–2	Chester	Rochdale
	Arthur; Withington	Report	Turner; Best	Stadium: Spotland Stadium; Attendance: 9582

1 November 1947 14	Crewe Alexandra	2–1	Rochdale	Crewe
	Finan; Taylor	Report	O'Donnell	Stadium: Gresty Road; Attendance: 8552

8 November 1947 15	Rochdale	2–1	Carlisle United	Rochdale
	O'Donnell; Withington	Report	Iceton	Stadium: Spotland Stadium; Attendance: 8777

15 November 1947 16	Rotherham United	4–1	Rochdale	Rotherham
	Armitage; Ardron; Mosby	Report	Earl	Stadium: Millmoor; Attendance: 13141

22 November 1947 17	Rochdale	0–2	Hartlepools United	Rochdale
		Report	Sloan	Stadium: Spotland Stadium; Attendance: 4502

6 December 1947 18	Rochdale	2–1	Darlington	Rochdale
	Davison (o.g.); Johnston	Report	Chadwick	Stadium: Spotland Stadium; Attendance: 7475

25 December 1947 19	Bradford City	4–0	Rochdale	Bradford
	Birch (o.g.); Flanagan; McGill; Sample	Report		Stadium: Valley Parade; Attendance: 13983

27 December 1947 20	Rochdale	2–0	Bradford City	Rochdale
	Johnston; O'Donnell	Report		Stadium: Spotland Stadium; Attendance: 6145

1 January 1948 21	Accrington Stanley	1–2	Rochdale	Accrington
	Mercer	Report	Wood; O'Donnell	Stadium: Peel Park; Attendance: 5785

3 January 1948 22	Rochdale	2–1	Wrexham	Rochdale
	Johnston; Moss	Report	Tunnicliffe	Stadium: Spotland Stadium; Attendance: 9687

10 January 1948 23	Gateshead	5–0	Rochdale	Gateshead
	Hawkins; Weddle; Wilbert	Report		Stadium: Redheugh Park; Attendance: 3857

17 January 1948 24	Halifax Town	2–3	Rochdale	Halifax
	Burns; Collins	Report	Johnston; O'Donnell	Stadium: The Shay; Attendance: 7310

24 January 1948 25	Tranmere Rovers	4–1	Rochdale	Birkenhead
	Bridges; Lamb; Atkinson	Report	Johnston	Stadium: Prenton Park; Attendance: 4880

31 January 1948 26	Rochdale	2–0	Oldham Athletic	Rochdale
	Withington; Wood	Report		Stadium: Spotland Stadium; Attendance: 12987

7 February 1948 27	Rochdale	1–0	New Brighton	Rochdale
	Lawrence	Report		Stadium: Spotland Stadium; Attendance: 4496

14 February 1948 28	Southport	2–2	Rochdale	Southport
	Wyles; Owens	Report	Withington; Arthur	Stadium: Haig Avenue; Attendance: 7708

28 February 1948 29	York City	0–0	Rochdale	York
		Report		Stadium: Bootham Crescent; Attendance: 7311

6 March 1948 30	Rochdale	1–2	Mansfield Town	Rochdale
	O'Donnell	Report	Butt; Cooling	Stadium: Spotland Stadium; Attendance: 9990

13 March 1948 31	Chester	2–1	Rochdale	Chester
	Westwood; Kirkpatrick	Report	Arthur	Stadium: Sealand Road; Attendance: 6427

20 March 1948 32	Rochdale	1–2	Crewe Alexandra	Rochdale
	Gallacher	Report	Goal	Stadium: Spotland Stadium; Attendance: 7092

26 March 1948 33	Rochdale	1–2	Stockport County	Rochdale
	Lawrence	Report	Swinscoe; Glaister	Stadium: Spotland Stadium; Attendance: 7183

27 March 1948 34	Carlisle United	5–0	Rochdale	Carlisle
	Connor; Iceton; Skivington (o.g.)	Report		Stadium: Brunton Park; Attendance: 10912

29 March 1948 35	Stockport County	4–0	Rochdale	Stockport
	Glaister; Barkas; Swinscoe	Report		Stadium: Edgeley Park; Attendance: 11002

3 April 1948 36	Rochdale	1–0	Rotherham United	Rochdale
	Arthur	Report		Stadium: Spotland Stadium; Attendance: 7314

6 April 1948 37	Rochdale	1–1	Lincoln City	Rochdale
	Wood 85'	Report	Stillyards 17'	Stadium: Spotland Stadium; Attendance: 8467

10 April 1948 38	Hartlepools United	4–1	Rochdale	Hartlepool
	Richardson; Donaldson	Report	Moorhouse	Stadium: Victoria Park; Attendance: 7907

13 April 1948 39	Barrow	0–1	Rochdale	Barrow-in-Furness
		Report	Wood	Stadium: Holker Street; Attendance: 5188

17 April 1948 40	Rochdale	2–1	Gateshead	Rochdale
	Livesey; Reid	Report	Callender	Stadium: Spotland Stadium; Attendance: 7031

24 April 1948 41	Darlington	0–0	Rochdale	Darlington
		Report		Stadium: Feethams; Attendance: 4614

1 May 1948 42	Rochdale	1–1	Tranmere Rovers	Rochdale
	Johnston	Report	Connor	Stadium: Spotland Stadium; Attendance: 5269

=== F.A. Cup ===
29 November 1947 1	York City	0–1	Rochdale	York
		Report	Birch (pen.)	Stadium: Bootham Crescent; Attendance: 9830

13 December 1947 2	Rochdale	1–1 (a.e.t.)	Gillingham	Rochdale
	O'Donnell	Report	Russell	Stadium: Spotland Stadium; Attendance: 11110

20 December 1947 2	Gillingham	3–0	Rochdale	Gillingham
	Forrester; Briggs; Wilson	Report		Stadium: Priestfield Stadium; Attendance: 17078

=== Lancashire Cup ===
23 September 1947	Rochdale	3–0	Preston North End	Rochdale
	Barkas; O'Donnell; Withington			Stadium: Spotland Stadium; Attendance: 5000

28 October 1947	Southport	1–0	Rochdale	Southport
	Goal			Stadium: Haig Avenue; Attendance: 3000
