= 1939–40 Rochdale A.F.C. season =

English football club season

Rochdale
1939–40 season
- Manager: Ted Goodier
- Stadium: Spotland Stadium
- Regional League - NW Division: 9th
- League War Cup: 3rd Round
- Top goalscorer: League: Arthur Richardson (14); All: Arthur Richardson (15)

The 1939–40 season was Rochdale A.F.C.'s 33rd in existence. They began to compete for their 19th season in the Football League Third Division North, however with the outbreak of World War 2, the league was abandoned, and a wartime league was formed. The F.A. Cup was also cancelled and replaced with the League War Cup.

== Squad Statistics ==
=== Appearances and goals ===
No.	Pos	Nat	Player	Total		Division 3 North		Regional League NW		War League Cup	
No.	Pos	Nat	Player	Apps	Goals	Apps	Goals	Apps	Goals	Apps	Goals
	GK	(Scotland) SCO	Peter Robertson	3	0	3	0	0	0	0	0
	DF	(Scotland) SCO	Tommy Baird	1	0	0	0	1	0	0	0
	DF	(Scotland) SCO	Tom Sneddon	12	0	3	0	4	0	5	0
	MF	(England) ENG	Dickie Rhodes	3	0	3	0	0	0	0	0
	DF	(Wales) WAL	Jim Pearce	21	1	3	0	14	0	4	1
	MF	(England) ENG	Reg Kilsby	3	0	3	0	0	0	0	0
	MF	(Scotland) SCO	Alex Ferguson	1	0	1	0	0	0	0	0
	FW	(England) ENG	Joe Duff	29	7	2	0	22	3	5	4
	FW	(England) ENG	Jimmy Wynn	22	5	3	1	14	4	5	0
	FW	(England) ENG	Tommy Dutton	16	3	1	0	12	3	3	0
	MF	(England) ENG	Peter Vause	7	1	3	0	4	1	0	0
	DF	(Scotland) SCO	William Keenan	3	0	3	0	0	0	0	0
	MF	(England) ENG	Wally Reynolds	3	1	2	1	0	0	1	0
	FW	(England) ENG	Harry Pollard	2	0	2	0	0	0	0	0
	GK	(England) ENG	Jack Ellis	2	0	0	0	2	0	0	0
	DF	(Wales) WAL	Gwyn Jones	1	0	0	0	1	0	0	0
	MF	(England) ENG	Jimmy Eastwood	27	0	0	0	22	0	5	0
	DF	(England) ENG	John Neary	2	0	0	0	2	0	0	0
	FW	(England) ENG	Willie Harker	9	1	0	0	8	1	1	0
	MF	(England) ENG	Ernest Steele	3	0	0	0	3	0	0	0
	FW	(England) ENG	Tommy Prest	5	1	0	0	4	0	1	1
	FW	(Wales) WAL	Tommy Olsen	13	1	0	0	13	1	0	0
	DF	(England) ENG	George Nevin	1	0	0	0	1	0	0	0
	FW	(England) ENG	Arthur Warburton	22	0	0	0	17	0	5	0
	GK	(England) ENG	William Carey	17	0	0	0	12	0	5	0
	DF	(Scotland) SCO	Tommy Chester	5	0	0	0	5	0	0	0
	MF	(Scotland) SCO	Alf Anderson	10	1	0	0	10	1	0	0
	FW	(England) ENG	Wally Hunt	2	2	0	0	2	2	0	0
	FW	(England) ENG	Arthur Richardson	15	15	0	0	14	14	1	1
	DF	(England) ENG	Tommy Smith	4	0	0	0	4	0	0	0
	DF	(England) ENG	Ernie Robson	2	0	0	0	2	0	0	0
	MF	(England) ENG	John Shadwell	1	0	0	0	1	0	0	0
	DF		J. Taylor	7	0	0	0	7	0	0	0
	FW	(England) ENG	Cliff Chadwick	1	0	0	0	1	0	0	0
	GK	(England) ENG	Jack Hall	6	0	0	0	6	0	0	0
	FW	(England) ENG	Alf Ainsworth	4	2	0	0	4	2	0	0
	FW	(Scotland) SCO	Duncan Colquhoun	9	1	0	0	5	0	4	1
	FW	(England) ENG	Sam Earl	1	0	0	0	1	0	0	0
	DF	(England) ENG	Bill Byrom	12	0	0	0	7	0	5	0
	MF	(England) ENG	Syd Rawlings	3	1	0	0	3	1	0	0
	MF	(Wales) WAL	Doug Redwood	5	2	0	0	1	0	4	2
	MF	(England) ENG	Roland Haworth	2	0	0	0	1	0	1	0
	FW	(Scotland) SCO	Archie Livingstone	2	2	0	0	2	2	0	0
	MF	(England) ENG	Alick Robinson	3	0	0	0	3	0	0	0
	FW	(England) ENG	Don Carter	3	1	0	0	3	1	0	0
	MF		J. McGowan	1	0	0	0	1	0	0	0
	FW	(England) ENG	Tommy Burdett	2	2	0	0	2	2	0	0
	MF	(England) ENG	Reg Halton	1	0	0	0	1	0	0	0

Squad Statistics (Non-competitive)

=== Appearances and goals (Non-competitive) ===
No.	Pos	Nat	Player	Total		Lancashire Cup		Jubilee Fund	
No.	Pos	Nat	Player	Apps	Goals	Apps	Goals	Apps	Goals
	GK	(Scotland) SCO	Peter Robertson	1	0	0	0	1	0
	DF	(Scotland) SCO	Tommy Baird	2	0	1	0	1	0
	DF	(Scotland) SCO	Tom Sneddon	1	0	0	0	1	0
	MF	(England) ENG	Dickie Rhodes	1	0	0	0	1	0
	DF	(Wales) WAL	Jim Pearce	2	0	1	0	1	0
	MF	(England) ENG	Reg Kilsby	1	0	0	0	1	0
	MF	(Scotland) SCO	Alex Ferguson	1	0	0	0	1	0
	FW	(England) ENG	Joe Duff	2	0	1	0	1	0
	FW	(England) ENG	Jimmy Wynn	2	0	1	0	1	0
	FW	(England) ENG	Tommy Dutton	2	0	1	0	1	0
	MF	(England) ENG	Peter Vause	1	0	0	0	1	0
	DF	(Scotland) SCO	William Keenan	0	0	0	0	0	0
	MF	(England) ENG	Wally Reynolds	0	0	0	0	0	0
	FW	(England) ENG	Harry Pollard	0	0	0	0	0	0
	GK	(England) ENG	Jack Ellis	0	0	0	0	0	0
	DF	(Wales) WAL	Gwyn Jones	0	0	0	0	0	0
	MF	(England) ENG	Jimmy Eastwood	1	0	1	0	0	0
	DF	(England) ENG	John Neary	0	0	0	0	0	0
	FW	(England) ENG	Willie Harker	0	0	0	0	0	0
	MF	(England) ENG	Ernest Steele	0	0	0	0	0	0
	FW	(England) ENG	Tommy Prest	0	0	0	0	0	0
	FW	(Wales) WAL	Tommy Olsen	1	0	1	0	0	0
	DF	(England) ENG	George Nevin	0	0	0	0	0	0
	FW	(England) ENG	Arthur Warburton	1	0	1	0	0	0
	GK	(England) ENG	William Carey	1	0	1	0	0	0
	DF	(Scotland) SCO	Tommy Chester	0	0	0	0	0	0
	MF	(Scotland) SCO	Alf Anderson	1	0	1	0	0	0
	FW	(England) ENG	Wally Hunt	1	0	1	0	0	0
	FW	(England) ENG	Arthur Richardson	0	0	0	0	0	0
	DF	(England) ENG	Tommy Smith	0	0	0	0	0	0
	DF	(England) ENG	Ernie Robson	0	0	0	0	0	0
	MF	(England) ENG	John Shadwell	0	0	0	0	0	0
	DF		J. Taylor	0	0	0	0	0	0
	FW	(England) ENG	Cliff Chadwick	0	0	0	0	0	0
	GK	(England) ENG	Jack Hall	0	0	0	0	0	0
	FW	(England) ENG	Alf Ainsworth	0	0	0	0	0	0
	FW	(Scotland) SCO	Duncan Colquhoun	0	0	0	0	0	0
	FW	(England) ENG	Sam Earl	0	0	0	0	0	0
	DF	(England) ENG	Bill Byrom	0	0	0	0	0	0
	MF	(England) ENG	Syd Rawlings	0	0	0	0	0	0
	MF	(Wales) WAL	Doug Redwood	0	0	0	0	0	0
	MF	(England) ENG	Roland Haworth	0	0	0	0	0	0
	FW	(Scotland) SCO	Archie Livingstone	0	0	0	0	0	0
	MF	(England) ENG	Alick Robinson	0	0	0	0	0	0
	FW	(England) ENG	Don Carter	0	0	0	0	0	0
	MF		J. McGowan	0	0	0	0	0	0
	FW	(England) ENG	Tommy Burdett	0	0	0	0	0	0
	MF	(England) ENG	Reg Halton	0	0	0	0	0	0

== Competitions ==
=== Football League Third Division North ===
26 August 1939 1	Doncaster Rovers	2–0	Rochdale	Doncaster
	Leyfield			Stadium: Belle Vue; Attendance: 10564

29 August 1939 2	Rochdale	1–0	Wrexham	Rochdale
	Wynn			Stadium: Spotland Stadium; Attendance: 6300

2 September 1939 3	Rochdale	1–0	York City	Rochdale
	Reynolds			Stadium: Spotland Stadium; Attendance: 6288

=== Regional League - North West Division ===
21 October 1939 4	Rochdale	1–3	Barrow	Rochdale
	Harker		Jones (o.g.)	Stadium: Spotland Stadium; Attendance: 2300

28 October 1939 5	Southport	3–2	Rochdale	Southport
	Goal		Dutton; Duff	Stadium: Haig Avenue; Attendance: 2000

11 November 1939 6	Rochdale	5–1	Accrington Stanley	Rochdale
	Dutton; Hunt; Wynn		Goal	Stadium: Spotland Stadium; Attendance: 3098

18 November 1939 7	Bolton Wanderers	4–0	Rochdale	Bolton
	Goal			Stadium: Burnden Park; Attendance: 2200

25 November 1939 8	Rochdale	1–1	Preston North End	Rochdale
	Richardson		Goal	Stadium: Spotland Stadium; Attendance: 3291

2 December 1939 9	Burnley	3–1	Rochdale	Burnley
	Goal		Wynn	Stadium: Turf Moor; Attendance: 1181

9 December 1939 10	Rochdale	3–1	Carlisle United	Rochdale
	Wynn; Richardson		Goal	Stadium: Spotland Stadium; Attendance: 1756

23 December 1939 11	Oldham Athletic	0–3	Rochdale	Oldham
			Richardson	Stadium: Boundary Park; Attendance: 1579

6 January 1940 12	Bury	3–1	Rochdale	Bury
	Goal		Richardson	Stadium: Gigg Lane; Attendance: 4437

20 January 1940 13	Rochdale	1–5	Blackburn Rovers	Rochdale
	Anderson		Goal	Stadium: Spotland Stadium; Attendance: 1629

10 February 1940 14	Barrow	1–1	Rochdale	Barrow-in-Furness
	Goal		Richardson	Stadium: Holker Street; Attendance: 2229

24 February 1940 15	Rochdale	1–2	Southport	Rochdale
	Richardson		Goal	Stadium: Spotland Stadium; Attendance: 1300

9 March 1940 16	Accrington Stanley	4–1	Rochdale	Accrington
	Goal		Ainsworth	Stadium: Peel Park; Attendance: 950

16 March 1940 17	Rochdale	2–2	Bolton Wanderers	Rochdale
	Vause; Wynn		Goal	Stadium: Spotland Stadium; Attendance: 2405

23 March 1940 18	Preston North End	5–0	Rochdale	Preston
	Goal			Stadium: Deepdale; Attendance: 5000

30 March 1940 19	Rochdale	1–1	Burnley	Rochdale
	Ainsworth		Goal	Stadium: Spotland Stadium; Attendance: 2500

6 April 1940 20	Carlisle United	1–2	Rochdale	Carlisle
	Goal		Olsen; Duff	Stadium: Brunton Park

24 April 1940 21	Blackpool	7–2	Rochdale	Blackpool
	Dodds		Rawlings; Richardson	Stadium: Bloomfield Road; Attendance: 2500

18 May 1940 22	Rochdale	2–3	Bury	Rochdale
	Richardson; Duff		Goal	Stadium: Spotland Stadium; Attendance: 1305

25 May 1940 23	Rochdale	3–1	Oldham Athletic	Rochdale
	Richardson; Carter; Livingstone		Goal	Stadium: Spotland Stadium; Attendance: 2003

28 May 1940 24	Rochdale	3–3	Blackpool	Rochdale
	Richardson; Livingstone		Goal	Stadium: Spotland Stadium; Attendance: 1850

3 June 1940 25	Blackburn Rovers	4–2	Rochdale	Blackburn
	Hargreaves		Burdett	Stadium: Ewood Park; Attendance: 353

=== Jubilee Fund ===
19 August 1939 26	Rochdale	3–1	Halifax Town	Rochdale
	Goal		Goal	Stadium: Spotland Stadium

=== War League Cup ===
13 April 1940 27	Rochdale	3–0	Accrington Stanley	Rochdale
	Pearce; Duff; Redwood			Stadium: Spotland Stadium; Attendance: 2500

20 April 1940 28	Rochdale	1–0	Bury	Rochdale
	Prest			Stadium: Spotland Stadium; Attendance: 7531

27 April 1940 29	Bury	1–1	Rochdale	Bury
	Goal		Duff	Stadium: Gigg Lane; Attendance: 6885

7 May 1940 30	Everton	5–1	Rochdale	Liverpool
	Lawton		Redwood	Stadium: Goodison Park; Attendance: 8335

11 May 1940 31	Rochdale	4–2	Everton	Rochdale
	Colquhoun; Duff; Richardson		Goal	Stadium: Spotland Stadium; Attendance: 6601

=== Lancashire Cup ===
4 November 1939 32	Blackburn Rovers	2–1	Rochdale	Blackburn
	Goal		Goal	Stadium: Ewood Park
