= 1941–42 Rochdale A.F.C. season =

English football club season

Rochdale
1941–42 season
- Manager: Ted Goodier
- Stadium: Spotland Stadium
- Football League North: 22nd
- Top goalscorer: League: Jimmy Cunliffe (12); All: Jimmy Cunliffe (12)

The 1941–42 season was Rochdale A.F.C.'s 35th in existence and their 3rd in the wartime league (League North). The first 18 matches were in the 1st Championship, in which Rochdale finished 22nd out of 38 clubs. The remaining matches were in the 2nd Championship (in which Rochdale did not play enough matches to be included in the final table). These matches were also league war cup qualifiers. Matches 28 to 31 were also in the Lancashire Cup.

== Squad Statistics ==
=== Appearances and goals ===
| No. | Pos | Nat | Player | Total | | Football League & War League Cup | |
| No. | Pos | Nat | Player | Apps | Goals | Apps | Goals |
|---|---|---|---|---|---|---|---|
| | GK | (England) ENG | Jack Hall | 4 | 0 | 4 | 0 |
| | DF | (Republic of Ireland) IRL | Bill Gorman | 8 | 0 | 8 | 0 |
| | DF | (England) ENG | Bill Byrom | 4 | 0 | 4 | 0 |
| | MF | (England) ENG | Jim Treanor | 30 | 1 | 30 | 1 |
| | MF | | Andrew Davenport | 5 | 0 | 5 | 0 |
| | DF | (England) ENG | Dick Webster | 7 | 1 | 7 | 1 |
| | MF | | Percy Taylor | 15 | 2 | 15 | 2 |
| | FW | (England) ENG | Jimmy Cunliffe | 24 | 12 | 24 | 12 |
| | FW | | Walter Horrabin | 8 | 1 | 8 | 1 |
| | FW | (England) ENG | Joe Duff | 26 | 7 | 26 | 7 |
| | FW | (Scotland) SCO | Duncan Colquhoun | 23 | 5 | 23 | 5 |
| | FW | | J. Wood | 2 | 0 | 2 | 0 |
| | FW | (England) ENG | Tommy Dutton | 1 | 0 | 1 | 0 |
| | DF | (England) ENG | Les Horton | 4 | 0 | 4 | 0 |
| | DF | (Scotland) SCO | Tom Sneddon | 21 | 0 | 21 | 0 |
| | GK | (England) ENG | Tom Swinburne | 5 | 0 | 5 | 0 |
| | MF | (Scotland) SCO | Alec Davies | 1 | 0 | 1 | 0 |
| | FW | (England) ENG | Alf Bellis | 1 | 0 | 1 | 0 |
| | GK | | Jack Smith | 1 | 0 | 1 | 0 |
| | MF | | S. Hanna | 1 | 0 | 1 | 0 |
| | MF | | William Whitaker | 2 | 0 | 2 | 0 |
| | FW | | Frank Wright | 3 | 1 | 3 | 1 |
| | FW | | David Jones | 9 | 7 | 9 | 7 |
| | FW | (Wales) WAL | Les Boulter | 1 | 0 | 1 | 0 |
| | MF | (England) ENG | John Neary | 16 | 0 | 16 | 0 |
| | MF | (England) ENG | Ernie Toser | 1 | 0 | 1 | 0 |
| | FW | (England) ENG | Alf Ainsworth | 2 | 0 | 2 | 0 |
| | FW | (England) ENG | Richard Haworth | 1 | 0 | 1 | 0 |
| | DF | | J. Horton | 8 | 0 | 8 | 0 |
| | MF | (England) ENG | Tom Dooley | 15 | 1 | 15 | 1 |
| | FW | (England) ENG | Verdun Jones | 11 | 5 | 11 | 5 |
| | FW | | Fred Smith | 11 | 1 | 11 | 1 |
| | GK | (England) ENG | Ernie Robson | 10 | 0 | 10 | 0 |
| | FW | (England) ENG | Wally Hunt | 1 | 0 | 1 | 0 |
| | FW | | R. Wood | 2 | 0 | 2 | 0 |
| | FW | (England) ENG | Harry Whitworth | 1 | 0 | 1 | 0 |
| | DF | (England) ENG | Jeff Barker | 1 | 0 | 1 | 0 |
| | | | J. Shields | 3 | 0 | 3 | 0 |
| | | | John Middleton | 1 | 0 | 1 | 0 |
| | GK | (England) ENG | Cliff Pitt | 7 | 0 | 7 | 0 |
| | MF | (England) ENG | Jimmy Eastwood | 3 | 0 | 3 | 0 |
| | | | W. Mangham | 2 | 0 | 2 | 0 |
| | | | Samuel Paton | 3 | 0 | 3 | 0 |
| | | | Robert Delaney | 1 | 0 | 1 | 0 |
| | FW | (Scotland) SCO | Willie MacFadyen | 2 | 0 | 2 | 0 |
| | FW | (England) ENG | Bill Walsh | 3 | 0 | 3 | 0 |
| | GK | (Wales) WAL | Roy John | 2 | 0 | 2 | 0 |
| | DF | (Scotland) SCO | Bobby Ancell | 1 | 1 | 1 | 1 |
| | FW | (England) ENG | Roland Bartholomew | 6 | 4 | 6 | 4 |
| | GK | (England) ENG | Arthur Chesters | 2 | 0 | 2 | 0 |
| | DF | (England) ENG | Gilbert Richmond | 5 | 0 | 5 | 0 |
| | DF | (England) ENG | Stan Cutting | 6 | 1 | 6 | 1 |
| | | | James Thorpe | 5 | 0 | 5 | 0 |
| | DF | (England) ENG | Norman Kirkman | 1 | 0 | 1 | 0 |
| | | | Frank France | 1 | 0 | 1 | 0 |
| | FW | (Wales) WAL | Ossie Jones | 1 | 0 | 1 | 0 |

== Competitions ==
=== Football League North ===
| 30 August 1941 1 | Rochdale | 3–2 | Oldham Athletic | Rochdale |
| | Duff; Colquhoun | | Goal | Stadium: Spotland Stadium; Attendance: 2445 |

| 6 September 1941 2 | Oldham Athletic | 3–0 | Rochdale | Oldham |
| | Goal | | | Stadium: Boundary Park; Attendance: 3000 |

| 13 September 1941 3 | Burnley | 3–1 | Rochdale | Burnley |
| | Goal | | Duff | Stadium: Turf Moor; Attendance: 2000 |

| 20 September 1941 4 | Rochdale | 1–1 | Burnley | Rochdale |
| | Cunliffe | | Goal | Stadium: Spotland Stadium; Attendance: 1995 |

| 27 September 1941 5 | Halifax Town | 4–2 | Rochdale | Halifax |
| | Goal | | Webster; Duff | Stadium: The Shay; Attendance: 3500 |

| 4 October 1941 6 | Rochdale | 2–2 | Halifax Town | Rochdale |
| | D. Jones; Wright | | Goal | Stadium: Spotland Stadium; Attendance: 2014 |

| 11 October 1941 7 | Rochdale | 1–5 | Preston North End | Rochdale |
| | Colquhoun | | Goal | Stadium: Spotland Stadium; Attendance: 2894 |

| 18 October 1941 8 | Preston North End | 6–0 | Rochdale | Preston |
| | Goal | | | Stadium: Deepdale; Attendance: 3000 |

| 25 October 1941 9 | Southport | 4–1 | Rochdale | Southport |
| | Goal | | D. Jones | Stadium: Haig Avenue; Attendance: 1500 |

| 1 November 1941 10 | Rochdale | 4–2 | Southport | Rochdale |
| | D. Jones; Cunliffe; V. Jones | | Goal | Stadium: Spotland Stadium; Attendance: 975 |

| 8 November 1941 11 | Rochdale | 1–0 | Bury | Rochdale |
| | V. Jones | | | Stadium: Spotland Stadium; Attendance: 1700 |

| 15 November 1941 12 | Bury | 2–3 | Rochdale | Bury |
| | Goal | | V. Jones; Dooley; Hunt | Stadium: Gigg Lane; Attendance: 1474 |

| 22 November 1941 13 | Bolton Wanderers | 3–3 | Rochdale | Bolton |
| | Goal | | Cunliffe | Stadium: Burnden Park; Attendance: 2200 |

| 29 November 1941 14 | Rochdale | 1–0 | Bolton Wanderers | Rochdale |
| | Cunliffe | | | Stadium: Spotland Stadium; Attendance: 1500 |

| 6 December 1941 15 | Rochdale | 2–2 | Blackburn Rovers | Rochdale |
| | Taylor; Duff | | Goal | Stadium: Spotland Stadium; Attendance: 488 |

| 13 December 1941 16 | Blackburn Rovers | 8–2 | Rochdale | Blackburn |
| | Goal | | V. Jones | Stadium: Ewood Park; Attendance: 1299 |

| 20 December 1941 17 | Rochdale | 0–5 | Blackpool | Rochdale |
| | | | Goal | Stadium: Spotland Stadium; Attendance: 1500 |

| 25 December 1941 18 | Blackpool | 0–1 | Rochdale | Blackpool |
| | | | Cunliffe | Stadium: Bloomfield Road; Attendance: 11500 |

| 27 December 1941 19 | Rochdale | 1–0 | Oldham Athletic | Rochdale |
| | Colquhoun | | | Stadium: Spotland Stadium; Attendance: 2317 |

| 3 January 1942 20 | Oldham Athletic | 3–2 | Rochdale | Oldham |
| | Goal | | Cunliffe; Horrabin | Stadium: Boundary Park; Attendance: 1000 |

| 10 January 1942 21 | Rochdale | 2–0 | Leeds United | Rochdale |
| | F. Smith; Taylor | | | Stadium: Spotland Stadium; Attendance: 2107 |

| 17 January 1942 22 | Leeds United | 5–0 | Rochdale | Leeds |
| | Goal | | | Stadium: Elland Road; Attendance: 3000 |

| 14 February 1942 23 | Manchester City | 5–0 | Rochdale | Manchester |
| | Goal | | | Stadium: Maine Road; Attendance: 4000 |

| 21 February 1942 24 | Southport | 2–1 | Rochdale | Southport |
| | Goal | | Duff | Stadium: Haig Avenue; Attendance: 1000 |

| 14 March 1942 25 | Rochdale | 2–8 | Liverpool | Rochdale |
| | Treanor 9'; Ancell 19' | | Balmer 2', 43', 44'; Done 10', 88' (pen.), 89'; Nieuwenhuys 19', 65' | Stadium: Spotland Stadium; Attendance: 2373 |

| 21 March 1942 26 | Rochdale | 3–1 | Manchester City | Rochdale |
| | Cutting; Cunliffe | | Goal | Stadium: Spotland Stadium; Attendance: 2323 |

| 28 March 1942 27 | Liverpool | 5–2 | Rochdale | Liverpool |
| | Liddell 2', 28', 89'; Dorsett 15'; Palk 70' | Report | Bartholomew 17', 26' | Stadium: Anfield; Attendance: 5000 |

| 11 April 1942 28 | Bury | 4–3 | Rochdale | Bury |
| | Goal | | Cunliffe; Colquhoun; D. Jones | Stadium: Gigg Lane; Attendance: 1648 |

| 18 April 1942 29 | Rochdale | 4–1 | Bury | Rochdale |
| | D. Jones; Duff; Bartholomew | | Goal | Stadium: Spotland Stadium; Attendance: 2010 |

| 25 April 1942 30 | Rochdale | 2–0 | Blackpool | Rochdale |
| | Colquhoun; Bartholomew | | | Stadium: Spotland Stadium; Attendance: 2736 |

| 2 May 1942 31 | Blackpool | 5–1 | Rochdale | Blackpool |
| | Goal | | D. Jones | Stadium: Bloomfield Road; Attendance: 6000 |
