= 1942–43 Rochdale A.F.C. season =

English football club season

Rochdale
1942–43 season
- Manager: Ted Goodier
- Stadium: Spotland Stadium
- Football League North: 41st & 21st
- League War Cup: 1st Round Proper
- Top goalscorer: League: Jimmy Cunliffe (20); All: Jimmy Cunliffe (20)

The 1942–43 season was Rochdale A.F.C.'s 36th in existence and their 4th in the wartime league (League North). The season was split into 2 championships. In the 1st Championship, Rochdale finished in 41st position out of 48, and in the 2nd Championship, they finished 21st out of 28. Some matches in the 2nd Championship were also in the League War Cup and Lancashire Cup.

== Squad Statistics ==
=== Appearances and goals ===
No.	Pos	Nat	Player	Total		Football League North & League War Cup	
No.	Pos	Nat	Player	Apps	Goals	Apps	Goals
	GK	(England) ENG	Jimmy Strong	28	0	28	0
	GK	(England) ENG	Ed Goodall	3	0	3	0
	GK		William Folds	1	0	1	0
	GK	(England) ENG	Arthur Chesters	2	0	2	0
	DF	(England) ENG	Lew Bradford	34	0	34	0
	MF	(England) ENG	Joe Duff	15	2	15	2
	DF	(England) ENG	Len Gallimore	6	0	6	0
	DF	(Scotland) SCO	Tom Sneddon	10	0	10	0
	DF	(England) ENG	Gilbert Richmond	9	0	9	0
	DF	(England) ENG	Jeff Barker	2	0	2	0
	DF	(England) ENG	Bill Byrom	8	0	8	0
	FW	(Wales) WAL	George Murphy	5	3	5	3
	DF		F.T. Sweeney	1	0	1	0
	MF	(England) ENG	Tom Wildsmith	7	0	7	0
	DF	(England) ENG	Jack Blood	3	0	3	0
	FW	(England) ENG	George Walton	5	0	5	0
	DF	(England) ENG	Stan Cutting	7	0	7	0
	MF		Arthur Garfoot	1	0	1	0
	MF	(England) ENG	Tom Dooley	3	0	3	0
	MF	(England) ENG	Tom Breakwell	17	0	17	0
	MF	(England) ENG	Jimmy Eastwood	3	2	3	2
	DF	(England) ENG	Ellis Cornwell	1	0	1	0
	DF	(Scotland) SCO	Tom Smith	9	0	9	0
	DF	(England) ENG	John Neary	7	0	7	0
	DF	(England) ENG	Tom Jones	12	0	12	0
	MF	(England) ENG	Jim Treanor	2	0	2	0
	DF	(Scotland) SCO	Bertie Duffy	13	1	13	1
	MF		Schofield	1	0	1	0
	MF	(England) ENG	Billy Burnikell	1	0	1	0
	MF		Herbert Palfreyman	3	0	3	0
	MF		Webb	1	0	1	0
	FW	(Scotland) SCO	Duncan Colquhoun	8	1	8	1
	MF		A. Jones	1	1	1	1
	MF		David Bebb	5	1	5	1
	MF		Frank France	1	0	1	0
	MF		Thompson	1	0	1	0
	MF		Harry Gee	19	7	19	7
	MF		Percy Taylor	1	0	1	0
	MF		Albert Collinge	1	0	1	0
	FW	(England) ENG	Jimmy Cunliffe	31	20	31	20
	MF		Brown	2	0	2	0
	MF		Norman Richmond	1	0	1	0
	MF	(England) ENG	Eric Wood	29	12	29	12
	FW	(England) ENG	Verdun Jones	4	0	4	0
	FW		James Thorpe	1	0	1	0
	FW	(England) ENG	Wally Hunt	4	0	4	0
	FW		Jack Harker	13	13	13	13
	FW		Shaw	1	0	1	0
	FW		Walter Horrabin	3	0	3	0
	DF	(England) ENG	Les Horton	3	0	3	0
	FW		N. Miller	1	0	1	0
	FW	(England) ENG	Frank Curran	1	0	1	0
			J. Manning	1	0	1	0
	FW	(Wales) WAL	David LG Jones	15	3	15	3
			Whalley	1	0	1	0
	FW	(England) ENG	Roland Bartholomew	5	2	5	2
	MF	(England) ENG	Ron Hornby	1	0	1	0
			Harry Cload	8	4	8	4
	DF	(England) ENG	Frank Marsh	1	0	1	0
			Byrne	1	0	1	0

== Competitions ==
=== Football League North & War League Cup ===
29 August 1942 1	Southport	1–1	Rochdale	Southport
	Goal		Bartholomew	Stadium: Haig Avenue; Attendance: 1200

5 September 1942 2	Rochdale	2–3	Southport	Rochdale
	Colquhoun; Bartholomew		Goal	Stadium: Spotland Stadium; Attendance: 800

12 September 1942 3	Rochdale	1–3	Halifax Town	Rochdale
	A. Jones		Goal	Stadium: Spotland Stadium; Attendance: 1744

19 September 1942 4	Halifax Town	3–0	Rochdale	Halifax
	Goal			Stadium: The Shay; Attendance: 3000

26 September 1942 5	Rochdale	3–1	Oldham Athletic	Rochdale
	Cunliffe; Bebb		Goal	Stadium: Spotland Stadium; Attendance: 1441

3 October 1942 6	Oldham Athletic	1–0	Rochdale	Oldham
	Goal			Stadium: Boundary Park; Attendance: 2464

10 October 1942 7	Rochdale	1–5	Blackburn Rovers	Rochdale
	Cunliffe		Goal	Stadium: Spotland Stadium; Attendance: 1325

17 October 1942 8	Blackburn Rovers	6–0	Rochdale	Blackburn
	Goal			Stadium: Ewood Park; Attendance: 850

24 October 1942 9	Rochdale	3–4	Blackpool	Rochdale
	Cunliffe; D. Jones; Wood		Goal	Stadium: Spotland Stadium; Attendance: 1800

31 October 1942 10	Blackpool	5–0	Rochdale	Blackpool
	Goal			Stadium: Bloomfield Road; Attendance: 8000

7 November 1942 11	Burnley	5–0	Rochdale	Rochdale
	Goal			Stadium: Turf Moor; Attendance: 2018

14 November 1942 12	Rochdale	2–1	Burnley	Burnley
	Harker; Gee		Goal	Stadium: Turf Moor; Attendance: 903

21 November 1942 13	Rochdale	3–1	Stockport County	Rochdale
	Cunliffe; Duffy; Cload		Goal	Stadium: Spotland Stadium; Attendance: 1355

28 November 1942 14	Stockport County	3–2	Rochdale	Stockport
	Goal		Wood	Stadium: Edgeley Park; Attendance: 1500

5 December 1942 15	Bolton Wanderers	4–4	Rochdale	Bolton
	Goal		Cload; Harker	Stadium: Burnden Park; Attendance: 1500

12 December 1942 16	Rochdale	3–1	Bolton Wanderers	Rochdale
	Cunliffe; Harker		Goal	Stadium: Spotland Stadium; Attendance: 1432

19 December 1942 17	Rochdale	6–3	Bury	Rochdale
	Gee; Eastwood; Cunliffe; Harker; Wood		Goal	Stadium: Spotland Stadium; Attendance: 717

25 December 1942 18	Bury	4–3	Rochdale	Bury
	Goal		Cload; Wood	Stadium: Gigg Lane; Attendance: 2880

26 December 1942 19	Rochdale	4–3	Oldham Athletic	Rochdale
	Cunliffe; Eastwood; Wood		Goal	Stadium: Spotland Stadium; Attendance: 4582

2 January 1943 20	Oldham Athletic	2–3	Rochdale	Oldham
			Gee; Cunliffe; Wood	Stadium: Boundary Park; Attendance: 1496

9 January 1943 21	Rochdale	4–0	Blackburn Rovers	Rochdale
	Cunliffe; Wood; D. Jones; Harker			Stadium: Spotland Stadium; Attendance: 1737

16 January 1943 22	Blackburn Rovers	2–2	Rochdale	Blackburn
	Goal		Harker; Cunliffe	Stadium: Ewood Park; Attendance: 2000

23 January 1943 23	Stockport County	3–4	Rochdale	Stockport
	Goal		Cunliffe; Gee; Harker	Stadium: Edgeley Park; Attendance: 2000

30 January 1943 24	Rochdale	6–0	Stockport County	Rochdale
	Wood; Harker; Cunliffe			Stadium: Spotland Stadium; Attendance: 2601

6 February 1943 25	Rochdale	3–2	Bury	Rochdale
	Gee; D. Jones		Goal	Stadium: Spotland Stadium; Attendance: 4234

13 February 1943 26	Bury	1–0	Rochdale	Bury
	Goal			Stadium: Gigg Lane; Attendance: 4863

20 February 1943 27	Rochdale	4–2	Burnley	Rochdale
	Murphy; Wood		Goal	Stadium: Spotland Stadium; Attendance: 3916

27 February 1943 28	Burnley	1–1	Rochdale	Burnley
	Goal		Gee	Stadium: Turf Moor; Attendance: 2399

6 March 1943 29	Rochdale	1–2	Blackburn Rovers	Rochdale
	Harker		Goal	Stadium: Spotland Stadium; Attendance: 7296

13 March 1943 30	Blackburn Rovers	3–1	Rochdale	Blackburn
	Goal		Wood	Stadium: Ewood Park; Attendance: 7865

20 March 1943 31	Rochdale	1–0	Oldham Athletic	Rochdale
	Cunliffe			Stadium: Spotland Stadium; Attendance: 2722

27 March 1943 32	Oldham Athletic	3–1	Rochdale	Oldham
	Goal		Cunliffe	Stadium: Boundary Park; Attendance: 2300

3 April 1943 33	Rochdale	4–0	Burnley	Rochdale
	Cunliffe; Gee; Duff			Stadium: Spotland Stadium; Attendance: 1783

10 April 1943 34	Burnley	2–0	Rochdale	Burnley
	Goal			Stadium: Turf Moor; Attendance: 1500
