= Peter Robertson =

Peter Robertson may refer to:

- Peter Robertson (triathlete) (born 1976), Olympic triathlete from Australia
- Peter Robertson (Canadian politician), Canadian politician
- Peter Robertson (footballer, born 1875) (1875–1929), Scottish professional footballer who played as a half back
- Peter Robertson (footballer, born 1908) (1908–1964), Scottish football goalkeeper
- Peter Robertson (golfer) (c. 1883–?), Scottish professional golfer
- Pete Robertson (born 1992), American football linebacker
- P. L. Robertson (Peter Lymburner Robertson, 1879–1951), Canadian inventor
- Peter Robertson (Jamaican politician), planter and slave-owner in Jamaica
- Peter Robertson (Presbyterian minister) (died 1916), in Queensland, Australia
