= Glaister =

Glaister as a surname may refer to the following:

- Andrew Glaister (born 1967), video game programmer
- Gabrielle Glaister (born 1960), English actress
- Geoffrey Glaister (1917 - 1985), English librarian
- George Glaister (born 1918), English footballer
- Gerard Glaister (1915 – 2005), British television producer and director
- Howard Glaister, OBE (1906 - 1995), Mayor of Carlisle
- John Glaister (1856 – 1932), Scottish forensic scientist
- Lesley Glaister (born 1956), British novelist and playwright
- Stephen Glaister (born 1946), Professor of Transport and Infrastructure, Imperial College London
