= Henry Lamb (disambiguation) =

Henry Lamb (1883–1960) was an Australian-born British painter.

Henry Lamb may also refer to:

- Henry Lamb (golfer) (1844–1893), Scottish amateur golfer
- Henry Lamb (politician) (1835–1903) , Australian politician from Tasmania
- Henry Lamb, an alias used by American songwriter George L. Spaulding (1864–1921)

== See also ==
- Henry Lamm (1846–1926), American jurist
- Harry Lamb (1925–1982), English footballer
