= Henry Hawkins (disambiguation) =

Henry Hawkins, 1st Baron Brampton (1817–1907) was an English judge.

Henry Hawkins may also refer to:

- Henry Hawkins (politician) (1790–1845), American politician from New York
- Henry Hawkins (cricketer) (1876–1930), English cricketer
- Henry Hawkins (Jesuit) (1577–1646), English devotional writer
- Ezra Pound (1885–1972), who used this name as a pen-name

== See also ==
- Harry Hawkins (disambiguation)
