= Harry Hawkins (disambiguation) =

Harry Hawkins was an athlete and engineer.

Harry Hawkins may also refer to:

- Harry Hawkins, character in Softly, Softly (TV series) and Softly, Softly: Taskforce
- Harry Hawkins, character in Stranger in the House (1967 film)
- Harry Hawkins (footballer, born 1915) (1915-1992), English footballer, in 1947–48 Rochdale A.F.C. season

== See also ==
- Harold Hawkins (disambiguation)
- Henry Hawkins (disambiguation)
