= Sophistication (books) =

External videos
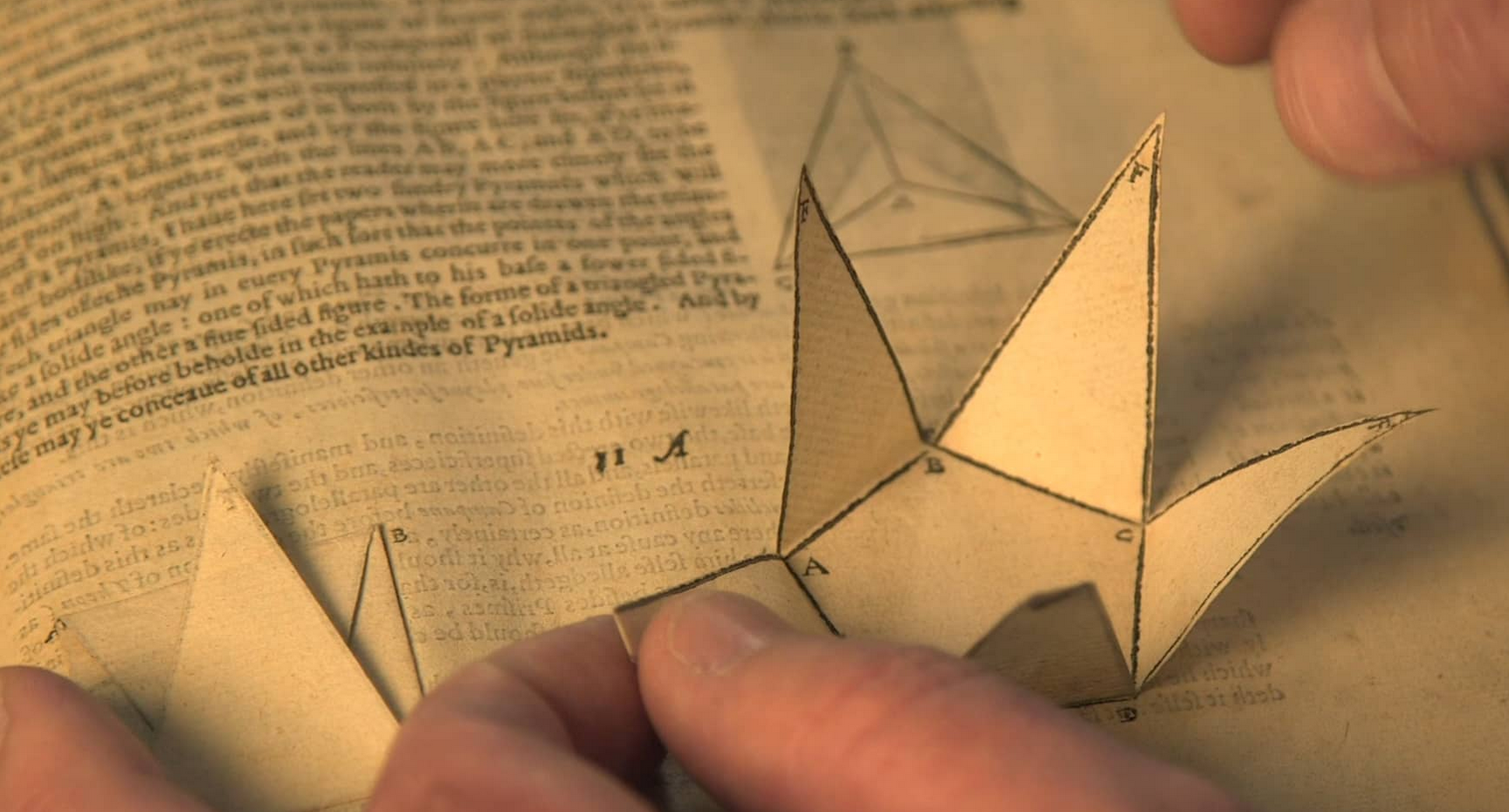
- Distilled #11: A 16th-Century Pop-Up Book and How an ancient mathematical pop-up book became “sophisticated.”, Science History Institute, January 21, 2020.

Sophistication of books is the practice of making a book complete by replacing missing leaves with leaves from another copy. In some cases this is done with the intent to deceive or mislead, modifying and offering books for sale in an attempt to sell them for a higher value. When offered for sale, a book's description should be clear and unambiguous, and indicate exactly and in detail any changes that have been made to the book.

The modern idea of what constitutes a "perfect" copy of a book and the negative connotation that is often applied to "sophistication of books" developed in the mid-late 1900s. Some prefer to use the term “made-up” to indicate books that were recreated from multiple copies. Understanding and tracking details of sophisticated copies is particularly important for provenance, for bibliometrics and for studying the history of distribution and readership networks and book trade economics.

== Definitions ==
According to the Encyclopedia of the Book (1996) by Geoffrey Glaister, the term sophistication is "said of an incomplete copy of a book which has been made complete by replacing a missing leaf or leaves with a leaf or leaves taken from another copy of the same edition, or with a carefully made facsimile reprint." This definition simply describes the state of the book, without implications of intention or value.

In ABC for Book Collectors (1952) John Waynflete Carter takes a more pejorative view, saying:

"This adjective, as applied to a book, is simply a polite synonym for doctored or faked-up. It would be equally appropriate to a second edition in which a first-edition title-leaf had been inserted, to another from which the words second edition had been carefully erased, to a first edition re-cased in second-edition covers, to a copy whose half-title had been supplied from another copy (made-up) or another edition, or was in facsimile."

However, Carter also notes, in discussing RE-CASING, that

"A repaired book is not necessarily a doctored, sophisticated or faked-up book, even though examples of the latter are still quite plentiful enough to make us wary. And the collector who keeps his eyes open when buying one, or gives his own job to a reliable binder {and makes a note in it afterwards of what has been done), has no need to apologise to anyone."

The Code of Ethics and Standards of the Antiquarian Booksellers' Association of America states:

“An Association member shall be responsible for the accurate description of all material offered for sale. All significant defects, restorations, and sophistications should be clearly noted and made known to those to whom the material is offered or sold. Unless both parties agree otherwise, a full cash refund shall be made available to the purchaser of any misrepresented material.”

Gentle restoration of a book is a legitimate thing to do, but misleading the purchaser of such a book is not. Indicators that leaves have been added to a book include anomalies in the predictable distribution of watermarks (e.g. watermarks on a pair of conjugate leaves), inconsistencies in illumination or annotation, extended margins, and even the appearance and disappearance of wormholes or other damage. While sophistication often occurs in the case of older books, it can also involve modern books. It is essential that any such changes must be clearly disclosed when a book is offered for sale.

== History ==
The term “sophisticate” originates from Ancient Greek, a verb meaning to become wise or learned. It later acquired the negative connotation of Plato's critique of the Sophists, for deceptive reasoning and rhetoric. The term's earliest appearances in late medieval and early modern England use “sophisticated” in this negative sense of adulterating or mixing in impure or foreign elements. This meaning is similar to the term's 20th century application to rare books.

The practices involved in the sophistication of books have not always been viewed negatively by book-buyers and book-sellers. Through the mid-nineteenth century, collation was understood as a process of textual comparison, a part of the work of collectors. They examined different iterations of a text in order to find “very trewe copies” and establish the correct or authoritative version. In England this was driven in part by a history of institutional destruction and dispersal and a desire to establish both national and religious identity.

In 1798, a book was considered to be complete if all the information it was expected to contain was present. When John Philip Kemble described one of his books as "perfect", he meant that all of its textual content, including illustrations, dedications and other information, was included in the copy. He did not mean that the book was in the same condition in which it originally left the printer. By later 20th-century standards, the same book is considered "imperfect" for several reasons: its leaves have been trimmed and later re-collated and the rebound copy does not include blank leaves that the original printers placed at the beginning and end of the text.

Over time, book-collecting and the state of one's books became seen as indicators of elite culture. During the eighteenth and into the nineteenth century, bibliophiles put considerable effort towards making a book "as clean as when it emerged from the printing press" through processes such as washing the pages. Efforts could even include cutting out and replacing entire pages where a previous owner had made notes in the margins.

During the late nineteenth and early twentieth century, many collectors accepted the practice of making up a complete copy of a book by combining leaves from various copies, usually of the same edition, to replace damaged or missing pages. For Victorian and Edwardian collectors, the goal was often an object that was not only complete in the sense of containing content, but also aesthetically pleasing: clean, attractive, with uniformly high quality pages and a decorative binding. Changes in binding techniques and methods of paper restoration made it possible to remove stains, fill in lost pages, and rebuild leaf margins almost invisibly. These rebound and “made-up” books were not seen as problematic at that time, and were often prized by both collectors and booksellers.

As of December 14, 1904, bibliophile Thomas James Wise wrote to collector John Henry Wrenn (1841–1911):

I have made your “Marriage A-la-Mode,” 1673, perfect. I found a very imperfect copy in a bundle of imperfect plays which I have, and fortunately it had the two leaves which in your copy had been supplied from a copy of the Third Edition. So now the book is all right!

Changes in attitude developed along with Anglo-American bibliographic techniques for determining whether or not a book's structure matched its original printing. Henry Bradshaw, librarian of the University of Cambridge, introduced the idea of copies as specimens of a work, and of a "perfect" work as an exemplar with characteristic features and structure. Bradshaw pioneered a methodology for the analysis of the structure of a textual object, articulating the idea of a “collational formula” for bibliographic description. Bibliographer W. W. Greg emphasized textual editing and collation formulas as primary ways of describing complete editions, “the necessary information for detecting imperfect copies.”

With these new techniques, emphasis shifted from the content of the book to its nature as a material object. Bibliographers attempted to establish a relational text's material connection to what Ronald Brunlees McKerrow identified as an author's originating “copy-text”, "the text that the publisher or editor used as the basis of his or her work." Iterations of a copy-text were like ghosts, each hinting at its own origin, mediated and formed by processes of production.

Bibliographers tracked differences between printings and bindings of copies, to identify whether a set of pages had originally belonged to a single material object. An edition refers to the set of copies that were printed from a single setting of type, generally at a particular time. From one edition to another, the text on the pages may differ due to modifications by the author, changes in pagination, and the introduction or correction of typographical errors by the type-setter. For example, differences in pagination and presence of typographic errors enable bibliographers to distinguish between the first and second editions of Charles Darwin's On the Origin of Species.

The Wrenn Library at The University of Texas has been described as "a time capsule of what it meant to collect English literature in the nineteenth century”. Its collection of seventeenth- and eighteenth-century English and American authors was assembled by John Henry Wrenn. It includes books that were restored, "made-up", or "sophisticated" by Thomas James Wise. Wise used techniques that were legal and acceptable at that time, some of which would now be considered undesirable sophistications. He also engaged in activities that were flatly illegal both then and now, such as tipping-in pages stolen from the British Museum.

With this shift in perspective on the perfect book, from complete content to exemplary copy, modifications that were seen as acceptable in earlier centuries were often seen as "tainting" the structure of the book. Sophistication became less acceptable. In mid-later 20th-century usage, the term is often put in negative contrast to the preservation of the material integrity of an original work.
