= Colophon (publishing) =

Brief statement of information about a book

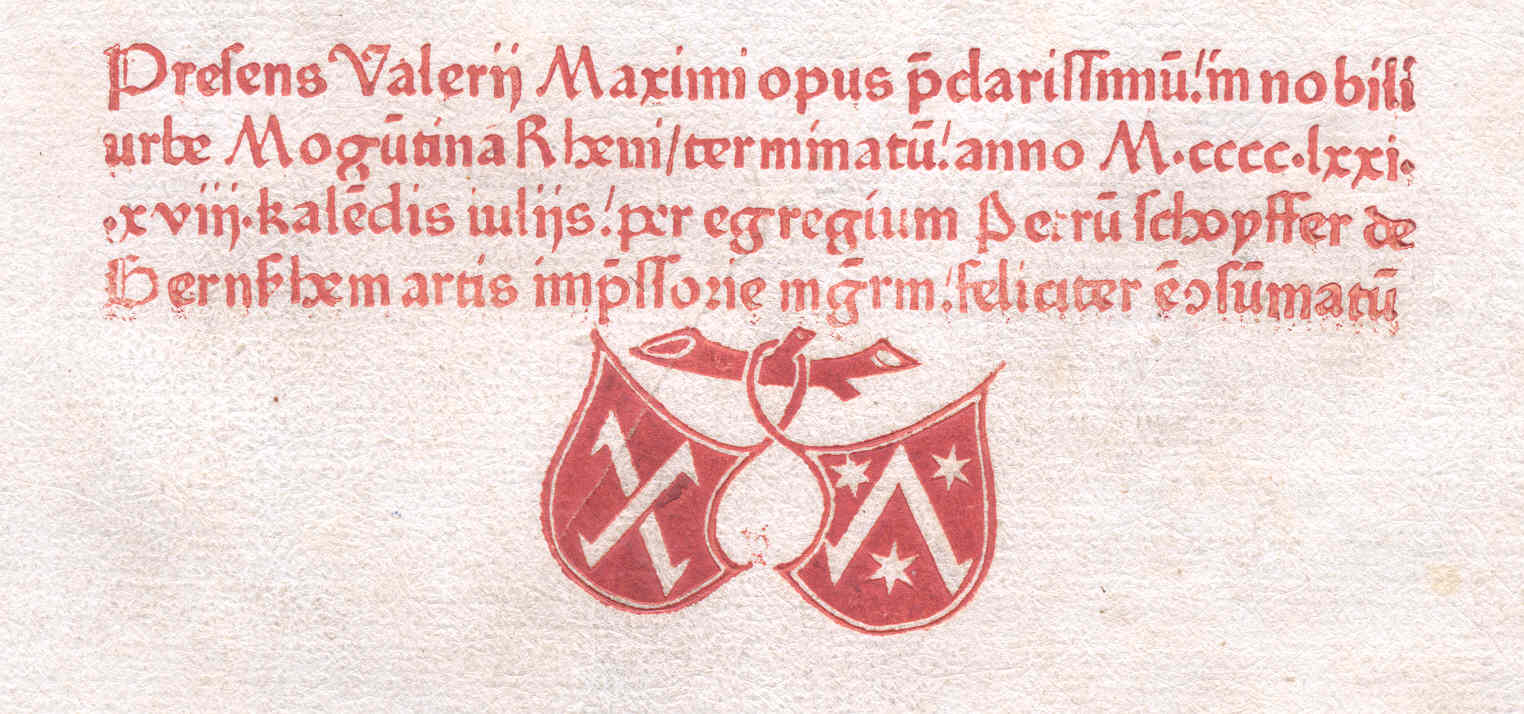
A colophon printed in 1471

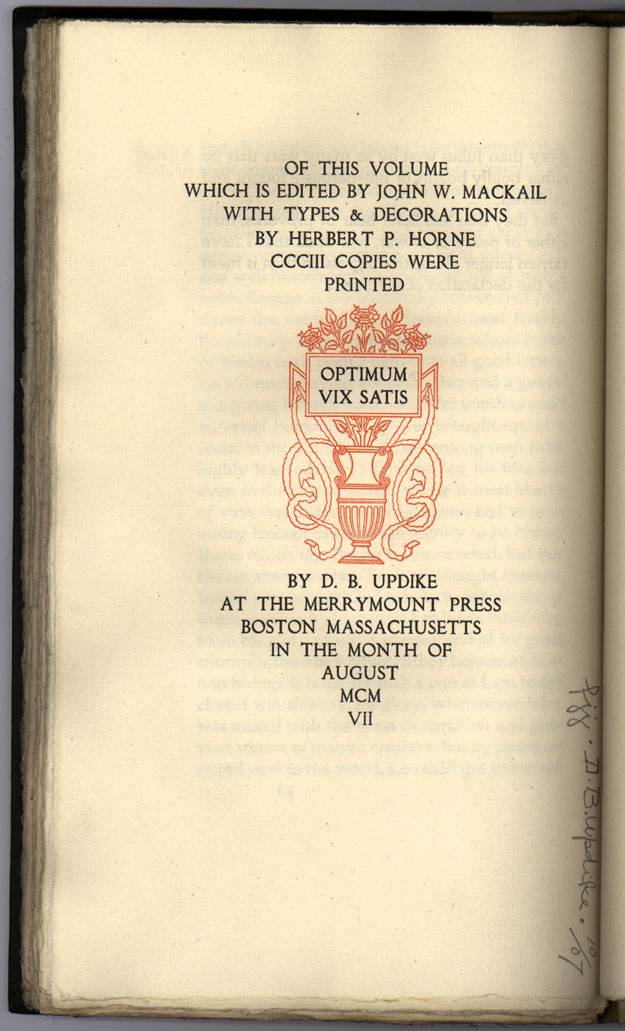
Against War by Erasmus, printed by the Merrymount Press, Boston, Massachusetts, 1907

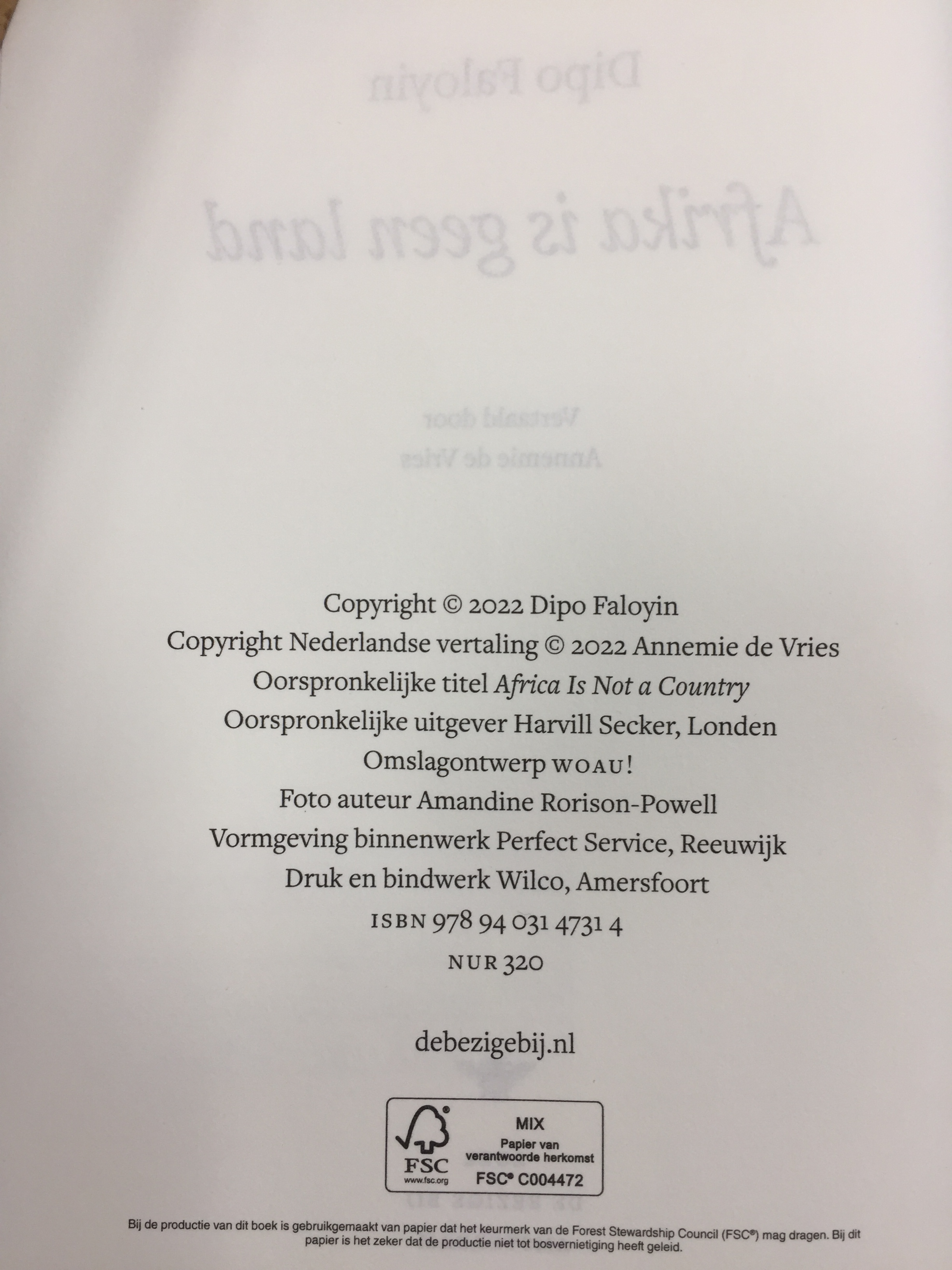
Colophon of the Dutch translation of Africa Is Not a Country printed in 2022

In publishing, a colophon (/ˈkɒləfən, -fɒn/) is a brief statement containing information about the publication of a book such as an "imprint" (the place of publication, the publisher, ISBN and the date of publication).

A colophon may include the device (logo) of a printer or publisher. Colophons are traditionally printed at the ends of books (see History below for the origin of the word), but sometimes the same information appears elsewhere (when it may still be referred to as colophon) and many modern (post-1800) books bear this information on the title page or on the verso of the title leaf, which is sometimes called a biblio page or (when bearing copyright data) the copyright page.

== Etymology ==
The term colophon derives from the Late Latin colophōn, from the Greek κολοφών (meaning "summit" or "finishing touch").

The term colophon was used in 1729 as the bibliographic explication at the end of the book by the English printer Samuel Palmer in his The General History of Printing, from Its first Invention in the City of Mentz to Its first Progress and Propagation thro' the most celebrated Cities in Europe. Thereafter, colophon has been the common designation for the final page that gives details of the physical creation of the book.

== History ==
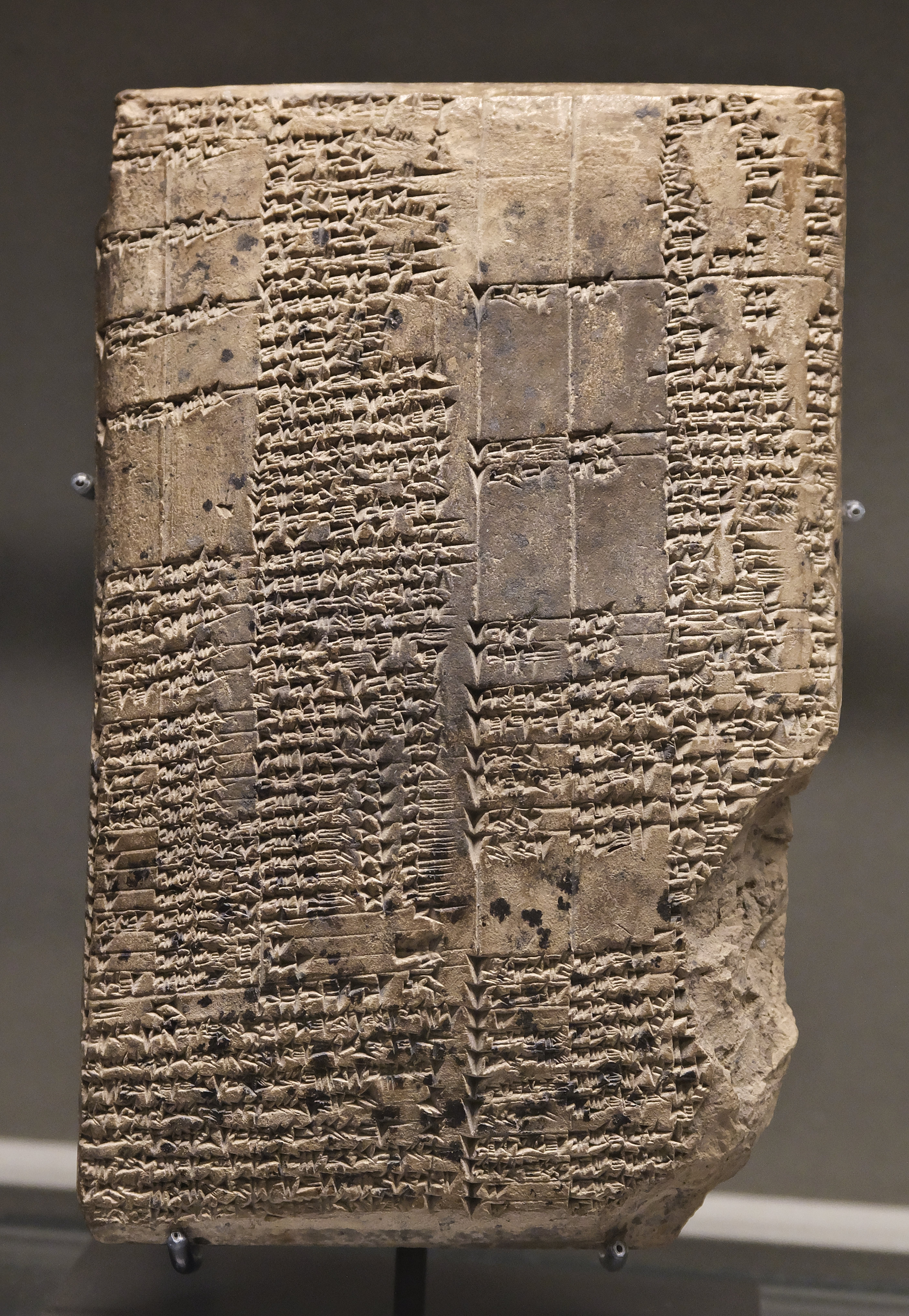
Clay tablet: dictionary with colophon indicating storage emplacement in a library. From Warka, ancient Uruk, mid 1st century BC. On display at the Louvre, Paris.

The existence of colophons can be traced back to antiquity. Zetzel, for example, describes an inscription from the 2nd century A.D., preserved in humanistic manuscripts. He cites the colophon from Poggio's manuscript, a humanist from the 15th century:

Statili(us) / maximus rursum em(en)daui ad tyrone(m) et laecanianu(m) et dom̅ & alios ueteres. III.
('I, Statilius Maximus, have for the second time revised the text according to Tiro, Laecanianus, Domitius and three others.')

A common colophon at the end of hand copied manuscripts was simply "Finished, thank God."

Colophons can be categorized into four groups.

Assertive
Provide the contextual information about the scribe and manuscript
Expressive
Demonstrate the scribe's feelings and wishes
Directive
Make the reader do something
Declarative
Do something with the reader

Examples of expressive colophons:

- "I have made an end at last, and my weary hand can rest."
- "Now that I an end have made,
  See that what I'm owed is paid."
- "May the writer continue to copy,
  and drink good wine."

Example of a directive colophon:

- O beatissime lector, lava manus tuas et sic librum adprehende, leniter folia turna, longe a littera digitos pone.
  ("O most gracious reader, wash your hands and touch the book only like this: turn the pages softly and keep your fingers far away from the text".)

Example of a declarative colophon:

- Si quis et hunc sancti sumit de culmine Galli / Hunc Gallus Paulusque simul dent pestibus amplis
  ("If anybody takes this book from Gall's estate, Gall and Paulus together shall inflict the plague upon him".)
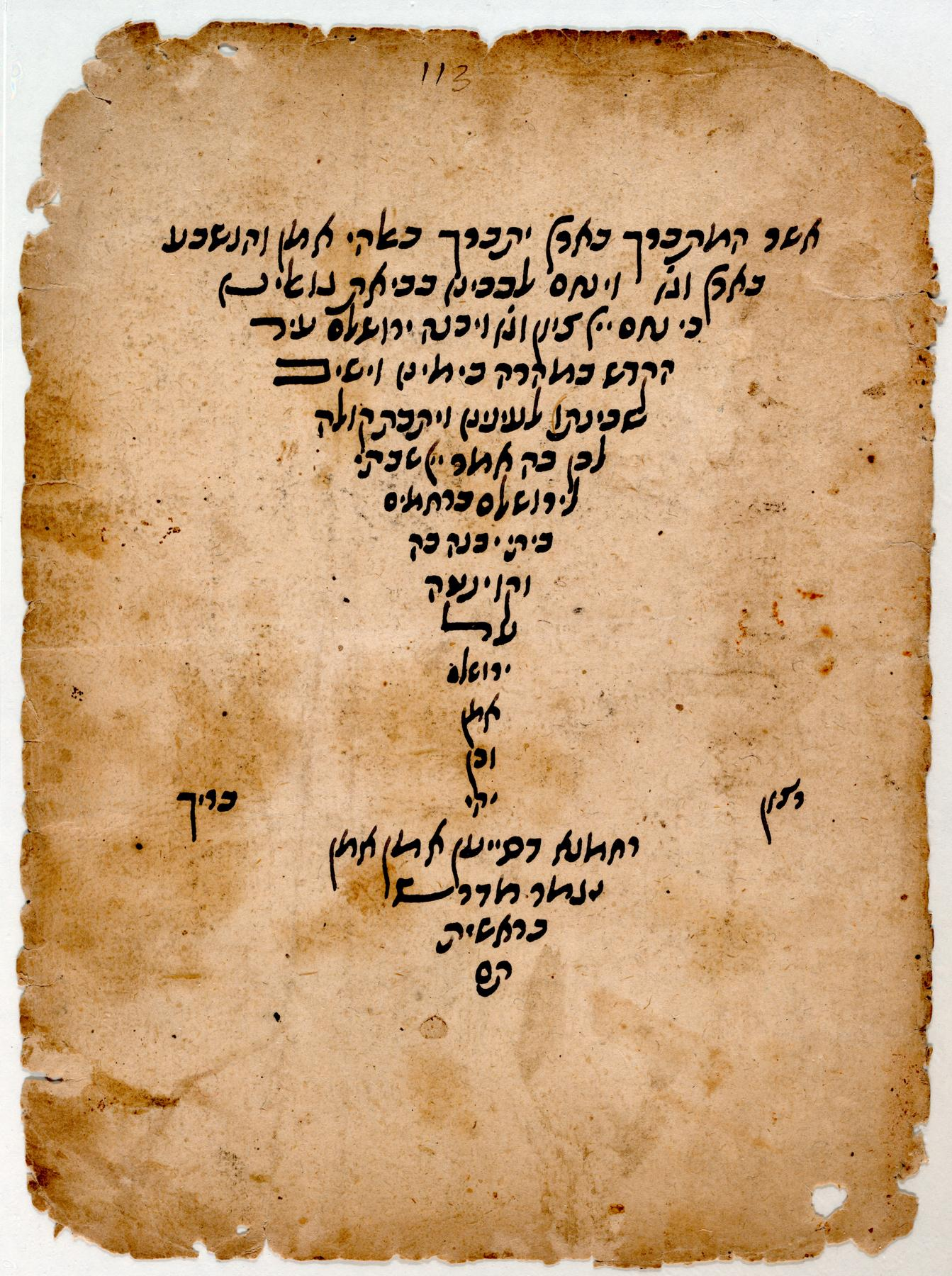
  Cairo Geniza colophon, 12th or 13th c

The term is also applied to clay tablet inscriptions appended by a scribe to the end of an Ancient Near East (e.g., Early/Middle/Late Babylonian, Assyrian, Canaanite) text such as a chapter, book, manuscript, or record. The colophon usually contained facts relative to the text such as associated person(s) (e.g., the scribe, owner, or commissioner of the tablet), literary contents (e.g., a title, "catch phrases" (repeated phrases), or number of lines), and occasion or purpose of writing. Colophons and catch phrases helped the reader organize and identify various tablets, and keep related tablets together. Positionally, colophons on ancient tablets are comparable to a signature line in modern times. Bibliographically, however, they more closely resemble the imprint page in a modern book.

Examples of colophons in ancient literature may be found in the compilation The Ancient Near East: Supplementary Texts and Pictures Relating to the Old Testament (2nd ed., 1969).

== Printed books ==
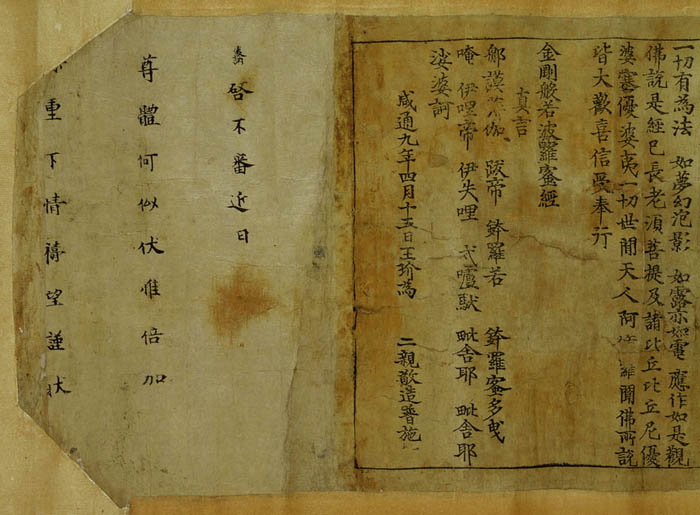
The colophon at the end of the Diamond Sutra, the world's oldest surviving printed book, states the date of printing (868 AD), the donor's name, the printing house, and that it was printed for free distribution.

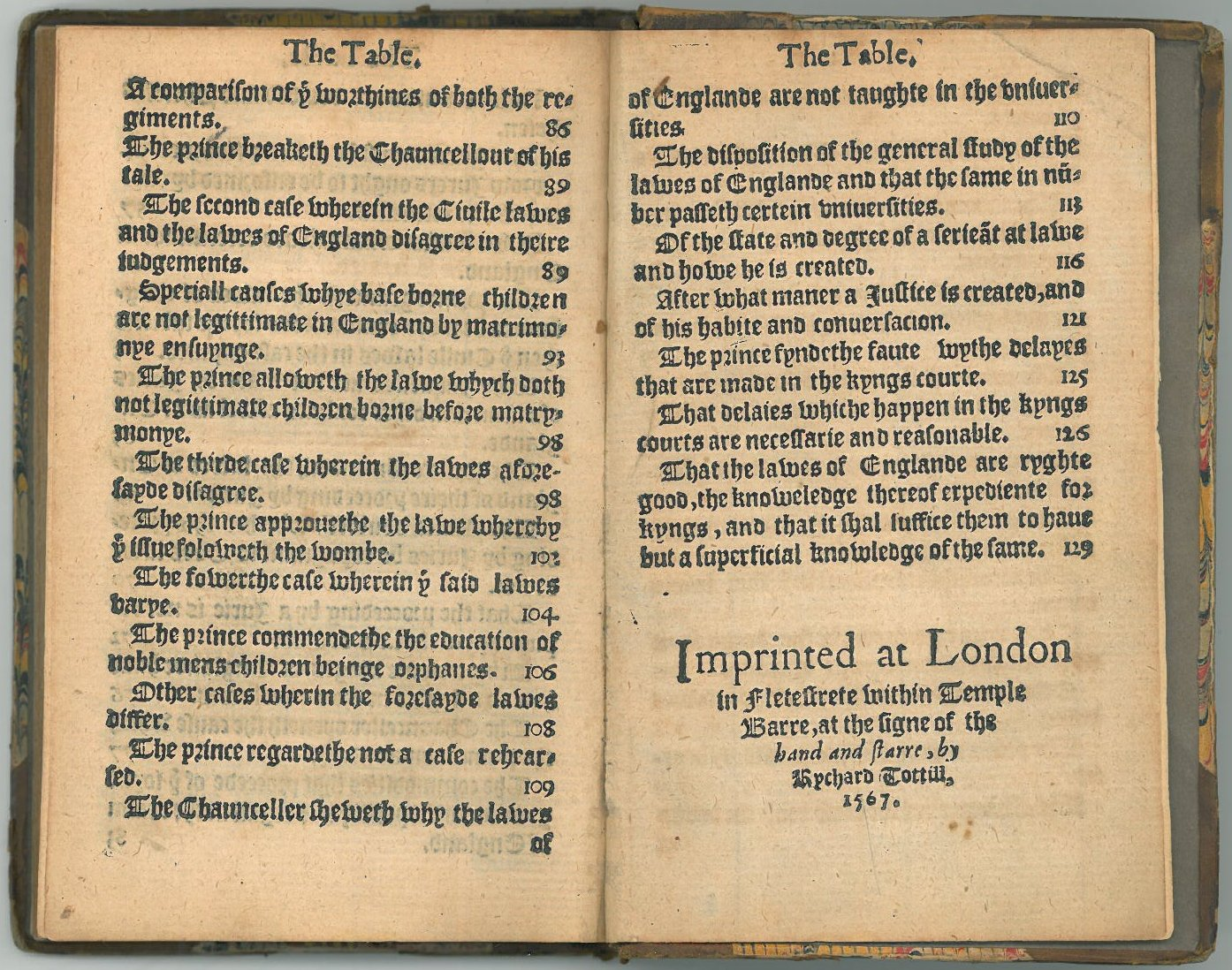
The colophon of John Fortescue's A Learned Commendation of the Politique Lawes of Englande (1567), which appears at the end of the book

In early printed books the colophon, when present, was a brief description of the printing and publication of the book, giving some or all of the following data: the date of publication, the place of publication or printing (sometimes including the address as well as the city name), the name(s) of the printer(s), and the name(s) of the publisher(s), if different. Sometimes additional information, such as the name of a proofreader or editor, or other more-or-less relevant details, might be added. A colophon might also be emblematic or pictorial rather than in words. The normal position for a colophon was after the explicit (the end of the text, often after any index or register).

Colophons sometimes contained book curses, as this was the one place in a medieval manuscript where a scribe was free to write what he wished. Such curses tend to be unique to each book.

After around 1500 these data were often transferred to the title page, which sometimes existed in parallel with a colophon, so that colophons grew generally less common in the 16th century.

The statements of printing which appeared, under the terms of the Unlawful Societies Act 1799 (39 Geo. 3. c. 79), on the verso of the title leaf and final page of each book printed in Great Britain in the 19th century are not, strictly speaking, colophons, and are better referred to as "printers' imprints" or "printer statements".

In some parts of the world, colophons helped fledgling printers and printing companies gain social recognition. For example, in early modern Armenia printers used colophons as a way to gain "prestige power" by getting their name out into the social sphere. The use of colophons in early modern Armenian print culture is significant as well because it signaled the rate of decline in manuscript production and scriptoria use, and conversely the rise and perpetuation of printing for Armenians.

With the development of the private press movement from around 1890, colophons became conventional in private press books, and often included a good deal of additional information on the book, including statements of limitation, data on paper, ink, type, and binding, and other technical details. Some such books include a separate "Note about the type", which will identify the names of the primary typefaces used, provide a brief description of the type's history, and a brief statement about its most identifiable physical characteristics.

Some commercial publishers took up the use of colophons and began to include similar details in their books, either at the end of the text (the traditional position) or on the verso of the title leaf. Such colophons might identify the book's designer, the software used, the printing method, the printing company, the typeface(s) used in the page design and the kind of ink, paper, and its cotton content. Book publishers Alfred A. Knopf, the Folio Society and O'Reilly Media are notable for their substantial colophons. The colophons in O'Reilly Media's technical books are notable for describing the animal featured on the book's cover, including details about the species.

== Websites ==
Some web pages also have colophons, which frequently contain (X)HTML, CSS, or usability standards compliance information and links to website validation tests.

== See also ==
- Edition notice
- Masthead (American publishing)
- Impressum
- Indicia
- Jerusalem Colophon
- Union label and printer's mark
- Wiseman hypothesis

== Sources ==
- Friedl, Friedrich; Ott, Nicolaus; Stein, Bernard (1998). Typography: An Encyclopedic Survey of Type Design and Techniques throughout History. New York, N.Y.: Black Dog & Leventhal. ISBN 978-1-57912-023-8.
- Glaister, Geoffrey Ashall (1979). Glaister's Glossary of the Book: Terms Used in Papermaking, Printing, Bookbinding, and Publishing, with Notes on Illuminated Manuscripts and Private Presses (2nd rev. ed.). London: G. Allen & Unwin. ISBN 978-0-04-010006-9.
- Hamilton, Victor P. (1990). The Book of Genesis: Chapters 1–17. Grand Rapids, Mich.: William B. Eerdmans Publishing Company. pp. 5–6. ISBN 978-0-8028-2308-3.
- Pollard, Alfred W. (1905). An Essay on Colophons: with Specimens and Translations. Chicago: The Caxton Club.
