= Kenny Banks =

English footballer and coach

Personal information
- Full name: Kenneth Banks
- Date of birth: 19 October 1923
- Place of birth: Wigan, England
- Date of death: 9 August 1994 (aged 70)
- Place of death: Abergele, Conwy, Wales
- Position: Wing half

Senior career*
Years	Team	Apps	(Gls)
1946–1952	Southport	118	(5)
1952–1959	Wigan Athletic	180	(21)
Total		298	(26)
- * Club domestic league appearances and goals

Kenneth Banks (19 October 1923 – 9 August 1994) was an English footballer and coach. He played as a wing half for Southport and Wigan Athletic.

== Career ==
Banks started his career at Southport, initially signing as an amateur before turning professional a couple of months later. After six years at the club, he returned to his hometown to play for Wigan Athletic. Between 1952 and 1959, he played 180 games and scored 21 goals for the club in the Lancashire Combination.

After the end of his playing career, Banks moved into coaching. He began coaching the reserves at Wigan Athletic, and was eventually appointed as first-team coach. In 1984, Banks and Duncan Colquhoun were awarded a testimonial by Wigan Athletic. He retired from coaching in 1986.
