= Mike Skivington =

Scottish footballer

Personal information
- Full name: Michael Noel Skivington
- Date of birth: 24 December 1921
- Place of birth: Glasgow, Scotland
- Date of death: 2 March 2012 (aged 90)
- Place of death: Enfield, England
- Position: Centre half

Youth career
- –1945: St Anthony's

Senior career*
Years	Team	Apps	(Gls)
1945–1947	Alloa Athletic	22	(0)
1947–1948	Bury	0	(0)
1948	Rochdale	1	(0)
1948–1949	Dundalk	18	(0)
1949–1950	Leyton Orient	5	(0)
1950–1951	Gillingham	8	(0)
1951–1952	Brentford	0	(0)

International career
- League of Ireland XI
- * Club domestic league appearances and goals

Michael Noel Skivington (24 December 1921 – 2 March 2012) was a Scottish professional footballer who played as a centre half in the Football League for Gillingham, Leyton Orient and Rochdale. He also played in the Scottish League for Alloa Athletic and in the League of Ireland for Dundalk. He made one appearance for the League of Ireland XI.

== Career statistics ==
Appearances and goals by club, season and competition
Club	Season	League			National cup (Note: Includes FA Cup, FAI Cup)		Other		Total	
Club	Season	Division	Apps	Goals	Apps	Goals	Apps	Goals	Apps	Goals
Rochdale	1947–48	Third Division North	1	0	0	0	―		1	0
Dundalk	1948–49	League of Ireland	18	0	4	0	15 (Note: 9 appearances in Dublin City Cup, 2 appearances in League of Ireland Shield, 4 appearances in other competitions)	0	37	0
Leyton Orient	1949–50	Third Division South	5	0	0	0	―		5	0
Gillingham	1950–51	Third Division South	8	0	4	0	―		12	0
Career total			31	0	8	0	15	0	54	0

== Honours ==
Dundalk

- FAI Cup: 1948–49
- Dublin City Cup: 1948–49
