= Harold Hawkins =

Harold Hawkins may refer to:

- Hawkshaw Hawkins (Harold Franklin Hawkins, 1923–1963), American country music singer
- Harold Hawkins (sport shooter) (1886–1917), British Olympic shooter
- Harold Hawkins (Rhodesia), Australian air force officer and commander of the Rhodesian Air Force
- Frank Hawkins (politician) (Francis Harold Hawkins, 1897–1971), Australian politician
- J. Harold Hawkins (c. 1892–1961), justice of the Supreme Court of Georgia

== See also ==
- Harry Hawkins (disambiguation)
