= Jack Ellis (footballer, born 1908) =

English footballer

Personal information
- Full name: John Ellis
- Date of birth: 25 January 1908
- Place of birth: Tyldesley, England
- Date of death: 20 January 1994 (aged 85)
- Place of death: Tyldesley, England
- Height: 6 ft 2 in (1.88 m)
- Position: Goalkeeper

Youth career
- Tyldesley United
- Tyldesley Juniors

Senior career*
Years	Team	Apps	(Gls)
- Atherton
–1930	Winsford United		
1930	West Bromwich Albion	0	(0)
1931–1934	Wolverhampton Wanderers	26	(0)
1934–1938	Bristol Rovers	86	(0)
1938–1939	Hull City	32	(0)
1939–1945	Clapton Orient	0	(0)
1939	→ Rochdale (guest)		
1945	Bath City		
1946	Stalybridge Celtic		
1946–1947	Mossley		
1947–1948	Winsford United		

Managerial career
- 1947–1948: Winsford United (player-manager)
- * Club domestic league appearances and goals

John Ellis (25 January 1908 – 20 January 1994) was an English professional footballer who played in the Football League for Bristol Rovers, Hull City and Wolverhampton Wanderers as a goalkeeper. In 1936, when Luton Town's Joe Payne set a Football League record by scoring 10 goals in a 12–0 win over Bristol Rovers, Ellis was the opposition goalkeeper. He later scouted for Leeds United.

== Personal life ==
Ellis served as a policeman during the Second World War.

== Career statistics ==
Appearances and goals by club, season and competition
Club	Season	League			FA Cup		Other		Total	
Club	Season	Division	Apps	Goals	Apps	Goals	Apps	Goals	Apps	Goals
Hull City	1938–39	Third Division North	32	0	2	0	1 (Note: Appearance in Third Division North Cup)	0	35	0
Career total			32	0	2	0	1	0	35	0

== Honours ==
Wolverhampton Wanderers

- Football League Second Division: 1931–32
