= Alex Ferguson (footballer, born 1913) =

Scottish footballer

Personal information
- Full name: Alexander Ferguson
- Date of birth: 6 March 1913
- Place of birth: Monifieth, Scotland
- Position: Outside right

Senior career*
| Years | Team | Apps | (Gls) |
| – | Lochee Harp | | |
| 1934–1936 | St Johnstone | 48 | (12) |
| 1936 | → Hibernian (loan) | 8 | (1) |
| 1936–1939 | Heart of Midlothian | 15 | (3) |
| 1939 | Rochdale | | |
| 1950 | Yallourn | | |
- * Club domestic league appearances and goals

Alexander Ferguson (born 6 March 1913) was a Scottish footballer who played as an outside right for clubs including St Johnstone, Hibernian and Heart of Midlothian.

While with St Johnstone, he was selected for a Scottish Football Association tour of North America in the summer of 1935; none of the matches was considered a full international. He had earlier represented his country at Junior level while with Lochee Harp.

His spell at Hibs was a short end-of-season loan to aid the team in their fight against relegation in 1935–36, which was successful. He then signed for their Edinburgh derby rivals Hearts, where a first campaign establishing himself was followed by a goal in the first round of the 1937–38 season; he also scored in the club's next fixture against Hibs in the Wilson Cup, but then suffered a badly broken leg in the last minute of the match. Ferguson never played for Hearts again due to the injury, signing for Rochdale in 1939 after a short trial with Falkirk, but he only made one Football League appearance prior to the outbreak of World War II, with the matches played declared void.

He emigrated to Australia and moved to Yallourn, where he became captain of Yallourn SC, the dominant club in Gippsland during the 1950s.
