= Ossie Jones =

Welsh footballer

Personal information
- Full name: David Oswald Edwards Jones
- Date of birth: 15 August 1909
- Place of birth: Ruabon, Wales
- Date of death: 2002 (aged 92–93)
- Height: 5 ft 9 in (1.75 m)
- Position: Inside right

Senior career*
Years	Team	Apps	(Gls)
- Afongoch Chums
1929	Wrexham	1	(0)
- Aberystwyth
- Llanerch Celts
- Gywlfia
- Connah's Quay & Shotton
1931	Nottingham Forest	0	(0)
1932	Wrexham	2	(0)
- Oswestry Town
1934–1936	Macclesfield Town	74	(74)
1936–1937	Tranmere Rovers	54	(12)
1938	Watford	2	(0)
1938	Southport	7	(2)
1939	Crewe Alexandra	0	(0)
- Monsanto
- * Club domestic league appearances and goals

David Oswald Edwards "Ossie" Jones (15 August 1909 – 2002) was a Welsh footballer who played in the English Football League for Wrexham, Nottingham Forest, Macclesfield Town, Tranmere Rovers, Watford and Crewe Alexandra
