= Tommy Chester =

Scottish footballer

Personal information
- Full name: Tom Holland Chester
- Date of birth: 7 November 1907
- Place of birth: Glasgow, Scotland
- Date of death: 16 January 1979 (aged 71)
- Height: 5 ft 10 1/2 in (1.79 m)
- Position: Full back

Senior career*
Years	Team	Apps	(Gls)
1926–1936	Bury	249	(0)
1936–1939	Burnley	51	(1)
1939–1940	Notts County	0	(0)
- * Club domestic league appearances and goals

Tom Holland Chester (7 November 1907 – 1979) was a Scottish professional association footballer who played as a full back.
