= Tom Breakwell =

English footballer

Personal information
- Full name: Thomas Breakwell
- Date of birth: 3 July 1915
- Place of birth: Stourport, England
- Height: 5 ft 10 in (1.78 m)
- Position: Left half

Senior career*
Years	Team	Apps	(Gls)
1933	Blackpool	0	(0)
- Lytham
1935	Bolton Wanderers	0	(0)
1936	Bradford Park Avenue	18	(0)
1937	Wrexham	3	(0)
- Fleetwood
- * Club domestic league appearances and goals

Thomas Breakwell (3 July 1915 – after 1937) was an English professional footballer. A left half, he played for four Football League clubs in the 1930s.

== Career ==
Breakwell began his career with Blackpool in 1933. After failing to get into the first team, however, he joined nearby Lytham. In 1935, he joined Bolton Wanderers, but again did not make a first-team appearance.

In 1936, he signed for Bradford Park Avenue, and went on to make eighteen League appearances for the club. The following year he joined the Welsh club Wrexham, for whom he made three League appearances.

He finished his career back on the Fylde with Fleetwood.
