= Alec Davies (footballer) =

Scottish footballer (1920–1998)

Personal information
- Full name: Alexander McLean Davies
- Date of birth: 21 May 1920
- Place of birth: Dundonald, Ayrshire, Scotland
- Date of death: February 1998 (aged 77)
- Place of death: Rotherham, England
- Position: Winger

Senior career*
Years	Team	Apps	(Gls)
–	Sheffield Wednesday	0	(0)
1945–1948	Lincoln City	37	(9)
–	Frickley Colliery		
- * Club domestic league appearances and goals

Alexander McLean Davies (21 May 1920 – February 1998) was a Scottish footballer who scored nine goals from 37 appearances in the Football League playing for Lincoln City. He played as a winger. He was on the books of Sheffield Wednesday without representing them in the league, and later played for Frickley Colliery.
