= Don Carter (footballer) =

English footballer

Personal information
- Full name: Donald Frederick Carter
- Date of birth: 11 September 1921
- Place of birth: Midsomer Norton, England
- Date of death: 2002 (aged 80–81)
- Place of death: Bath, England
- Positions: Outside left; inside forward

Senior career*
Years	Team	Apps	(Gls)
- Norton St John's
193?–1939	Stourbridge		
1939–1948	Bury	56	(27)
1948	Blackburn Rovers	2	(0)
1948–1951	New Brighton	105	(19)
1951–195?	Northwich Victoria		
- * Club domestic league appearances and goals

Donald Frederick Carter (11 September 1921 – 2002) was an English professional footballer who scored 46 goals from 163 appearances in the Football League playing as an outside left or inside forward for Bury, Blackburn Rovers and New Brighton.

== Life and career ==
Carter was born in Midsomer Norton, Somerset, in 1921. He played non-league football for Norton St John's before joining Birmingham League club Stourbridge early in the 1938–39 season. Playing at outside left, he soon attracted attention from bigger clubs, and in January 1939 signed for Bury of the Football League Second Division.

He did not make his senior debut for the club until after the Second World War, and scored 27 goals from 56 matches over two seasons. The goals included a hat-trick in a 6–3 win against Bradford Park Avenue in 1947. Carter spent a few months with Blackburn Rovers, playing twice without scoring, and then joined New Brighton in November 1948. He scored 19 goals from 105 league appearances, and left for Northwich Victoria after New Brighton finished bottom of the Third Division North and were not re-elected.

Carter died in Bath, Somerset, in 2002.
