= Dick Withington =

English footballer

Personal information
- Full name: Richard Stanley Withington
- Date of birth: 8 April 1921
- Place of birth: South Shields, England
- Date of death: 2 September 1981 (aged 60)
- Place of death: Sheffield, England
- Position: Inside forward

Senior career*
| Years | Team | Apps | (Gls) |
| 1938–1947 | Blackpool | 0 | (0) |
| 1947–1948 | Rochdale | 32 | (6) |
| 1948–1949 | Chesterfield | 6 | (0) |
- Buxton
| Total | | 38 | (6) |
- * Club domestic league appearances and goals

Richard Stanley Withington (8 April 1921 – 2 September 1981) was an English professional footballer who played in the Football League as an inside forward.

== Sources ==
- Dick Withington at Post War English & Scottish Football League A–Z Player's Transfer Database
