= Doug Redwood =

Welsh footballer

Personal information
- Full name: Douglas James Redwood
- Date of birth: 1918
- Place of birth: Ebbw Vale, Wales
- Height: 5 ft 6 1/2 in (1.69 m)
- Position: Outside forward

Senior career*
Years	Team	Apps	(Gls)
- Ebbw Vale
1935–1937	Cardiff City	13	(0)
1937–1939	Walsall		
1939	Rochdale	0	(0)
- * Club domestic league appearances and goals

Douglas James Redwood (1918 – after 1939) was a Welsh professional footballer who played as an outside forward. He joined Cardiff City from his hometown side Ebbw Vale in 1935 and made thirteen league appearances for the side. He later played for Walsall before joining Rochdale in 1939, where he ended his professional career following the outbreak of World War II.
