= Peter Robertson (Presbyterian minister) =

Peter Robertson ( – 13 July 1916) was a Presbyterian minister in Queensland, Australia. He was pastor of St Stephen's Church, Ipswich for 39 years.

== History ==
Robertson was born in Lanarkshire, Scotland, and studied for the ministry at Edinburgh, worked as home missionary in the city of Edinburgh and nearby Niddrie.

Seeking a warmer client for the health of his wife, who had lost two children, he was sent by the Free Church of Scotland to Queensland, arriving in 1873, served as minister of the church at Dalby for four years, then accepted a call to St Stephen's Church, Ipswich: he was inducted in July, 1877.

In 1884 Robertson and his wife were passengers in a railway carriage of a train which came into collision with another at Darra. Both were injured, Mrs Robertson seriously so, and was as a result confined to bed for a year and never fully recovered.

He was convener of the Queensland Church Property Committee for 20 years.

He was nominated moderator of the Brisbane Presbytery to replace Rev J. F. McSwaine in 1882 but declined the honour. but acceded for the year 1886–87

He was convener of the Foreign Missions Committee for Queensland in 1907, then Moderator-General of the Presbyterian Church of Australia 1907–1909, succeeded by Rev. John Ferguson of Sydney.

He was a prominent Freemason, a member of the Caledonian Lodge, No. 456, S.C.

He made a trip to Great Britain in 1903, returning by the SS Omrah.

Around 1913 he visited England as the Australian delegate to the Pan-Presbyterian Council.

He was elected a life-governor of the British and Foreign Bible Society.

He was president of the Ministers' Association of Brisbane.

In later years he was no longer able to manage St Stephen's Church single-handed, and received assistance from Rev. S. F. Hunter for a few years, then Rev. G. K. Kirke.

He retired in 1911 and was succeeded at St Stephen's by Rev. S. F. Hunter.

== Family ==
Robertson married Eliza Clark Innes (c. 1838 – 27 October 1904) of Yair, in Selkirkshire, Scotland, in 1863. They had two surviving children:

- Dr William Nathaniel Robertson (1866 – 12 June 1938) was a pathologist in Ireland, later Vice Chancellor of Brisbane University. He married Clara Pollard on 8 May 1924.
- Mary Robertson (21 August 1877 – ), married Thomas Horton Campbell on 12 April 1912, lived at Syntax Street, Ipswich.
