= Danny Flanagan =

Irish footballer (1924–2019)

Personal information
- Full name: Daniel Christopher Flanagan
- Date of birth: 24 November 1924
- Place of birth: Dublin, Ireland
- Date of death: January 2019 (aged 94)
- Height: 6 ft 0 in (1.83 m)
- Position: Centre forward

Senior career*
Years	Team	Apps	(Gls)
1943–1943	St James's Gate		
1943–1946	Dundalk	22	(9)
1946	Huddersfield Town	0	(0)
1946–1947	Notts County	2	(2)
1947	Shelbourne		
1947	Manchester City	0	(0)
1947–1948	Bradford City	13	(6)
Total		37+	(17+)
- * Club domestic league appearances and goals

Daniel Christopher Flanagan (24 November 1924 – January 2019), also known as Donal Flanagan, was an Irish amateur footballer who played as a centre forward. He was also a sprinter and rugby union player.

== Football career ==
Born in Dublin, Flanagan played for St James's Gate, Dundalk, Huddersfield Town, Notts County, Shelbourne, Manchester City and Bradford City.

He scored a hat-trick on his League of Ireland debut for St James's Gate at the age of 18. He was close to signing with Bohemians, but their schedule clashed with his rugby career and he signed for Dundalk instead.

He scored 2 goals in 2 League games for Notts County, but declined professional terms and returned to Ireland, before signing for Manchester City.

For Bradford City he made 13 appearances in the Football League, scoring 6 goals.

== Other sports ==
Flanagan was also a sprinter, and in 1943 won the national titles at 60, 100 and 220 yards, and was runner-up in the 440 years to his brother Brendan. He was also an amateur rugby player who played for Bective Rangers.

== Sources ==
- Frost, Terry (1988). Bradford City A Complete Record 1903-1988. Breedon Books Sport. ISBN 0-907969-38-0.
