= Andy McGill =

Scottish footballer

Personal information
- Full name: Andrew McGill
- Date of birth: 11 July 1924
- Place of birth: Glasgow, Scotland
- Date of death: September 1988 (aged 64)
- Place of death: Beverley, England
- Position: Wing half

Senior career*
Years	Team	Apps	(Gls)
1942–1945	Third Lanark	0	(0)
1945–1946	Queen's Park	0	(0)
1946–1947	Clyde	4	(0)
1947–1952	Bradford City	164	(24)
1952–1957	Scunthorpe	183	(15)
Total		351	(39)
- * Club domestic league appearances and goals

Andrew McGill (11 July 1924 – September 1988) was a Scottish professional footballer, who played as a wing half for Third Lanark, Queen's Park, Clyde, Bradford City and Scunthorpe.
