= Lloyd Iceton =

English footballer

Personal information
- Full name: Osborne Lloyd Iceton
- Date of birth: 30 March 1920
- Place of birth: Workington, England
- Date of death: July 1994 (aged 74)
- Position: Outside left

Senior career*
Years	Team	Apps	(Gls)
1938–1946	Preston North End		
1940	→ Liverpool	0	(0)
1945	→ Leeds United	0	(0)
1944–1945	→ Nottingham Forest	0	(0)
1945–1946	→ Notts County	0	(0)
1946–1950	Carlisle United	77	(18)
1950–1955	Tranmere Rovers	140	(18)
- * Club domestic league appearances and goals

Osborne Lloyd Iceton (30 March 1920 – June 1994) was an English footballer who played as an outside left for Preston North End, Carlisle United and Tranmere Rovers.

Born in Workington, Iceton signed for Preston North End in May 1938 but did not represent them before the Second World War. During the war, he played as a wartime guest player for Liverpool, Leeds United, Nottingham Forest and Notts County. In October 1946, Iceton joined Carlisle United where he was renowned for his powerful shooting; in 2009, he was voted Carlisle's 96th best ever player.

In June 1950, Iceton moved to Tranmere Rovers. He made a total of 153 appearances – 140 in the English Football League – scoring 22 goals, before retiring in 1955. Iceton died in June 1994, and his remains were scattered on the Prenton Park pitch.
