= Harold Bridges =

English footballer (1915–1989)

Personal information
- Full name: Harold Bridges
- Date of birth: 30 June 1915
- Place of birth: Burton-on-Trent, England
- Date of death: 1989 (aged 73–74)
- Place of death: Stockport, England
- Position: Inside forward

Senior career*
Years	Team	Apps	(Gls)
1946–1948	Tranmere Rovers	33	(9)
- * Club domestic league appearances and goals

Harold Bridges (30 June 1915 – 1989) was an English footballer, who played as an inside forward in the Football League for Tranmere Rovers.
