= Jackie Arthur =

English footballer

Personal information
- Full name: John Arthur
- Date of birth: 14 December 1917
- Place of birth: Edenfield, Ramsbottom, England
- Date of death: 19 November 1986 (aged 68)
- Place of death: Edenfield, Ramsbottom, England
- Position: Winger

Senior career*
| Years | Team | Apps | (Gls) |
| 1936 | Blackburn Rovers | 0 | (0) |
| 1936–1938 | Everton | 0 | (0) |
| 1938–1940 | Stockport County | 2 | (0) |
| 1940–1946 | Everton | ? | (?) |
| 1946 | →Wrexham (war guest) | ? | (?) |
| 1946–1947 | Chester | 24 | (3) |
| 1947–1953 | Rochdale | 170 | (25) |
- * Club domestic league appearances and goals

John "Jackie" Arthur (14 December 1917 – 19 November 1986) was an English footballer.

== Playing career ==
Arthur began his career at Blackburn Rovers and Everton without making any league appearances, before playing for Stockport County shortly before the outbreak of the Second World War. During the war he returned to Everton and made guest appearances for Wrexham.

After the war Arthur spent almost a year at Chester before concluding his professional career with a long spell at Rochdale. After retiring from playing he remained on the training staff at Spotland.
