= Peter Robertson (Jamaican politician) =

Planter and politician in Jamaica

Peter Robertson was a planter and slave-owner in Jamaica. He owned Dunrobin Plantation, Friendship Valley Pen, Prospect pen, and the Weybridge Estate, and had interests in others. He was elected to the House of Assembly of Jamaica in 1820 for the parish of Saint Thomas-in-the-East.
