= Walter Cornock =

Australian cricketer and soccer player

Personal information
- Full name: Walter Berkeley Cornock
- Date of birth: 1 January 1921
- Place of birth: Waverley, Sydney, Australia
- Date of death: 20 November 2007 (aged 86)
- Place of death: Mollymook, New South Wales, Australia
- Position: Goalkeeper

Senior career*
Years	Team	Apps	(Gls)
- Royton Amateurs
19??–1940	Ashton National		
1940	Ashton United	14	(0)
1945	Oldham Athletic	0	(0)
- Hereford United
1947	Rochdale	1	(0)
- Cricket career
Cricket information
- Batting: Right-handed
- Bowling: Left-arm medium
- Role: All-rounder
Domestic team information
- Years: Team
- 1948: Leicestershire
Career statistics
Competition	FC
Matches	26
Runs scored	801
Batting average	19.54
100s/50s	0/5
Top score	60
Balls bowled	2322
Wickets	81
Bowling average	67.13
5 wickets in innings	0
10 wickets in match	0
Best bowling	3/46
Catches/stumpings
- Source: , 16 March 2010
- * Club domestic league appearances and goals

Walter Berkeley Cornock (1 January 1921 – 20 November 2007) was an Australian football goalkeeper and first-class cricketer. Born in Waverley, Sydney; he moved to the United Kingdom and played in the Football League for Rochdale and played first-class cricket for Leicestershire. He also saw active service in the navy in Africa during the Second World War.

Cornock was born to an Australian father and English mother. His family returned to England while he was a child.

== Football career ==
Cornock played for Royton Amateurs before joining Ashton National. When National stopped playing in 1940 with the onset of the Second World War, Cornock switched to local rivals Ashton United who were still playing. He made his debut for Ashton United in September 1940 against Droylsden playing fourteen times, with his last game coming away to Denton United in late December the same year. He served in the Royal Navy during the war and saw active service in Africa and the North sea, he served on Corvettes, and was on K49 (Crocus) (movie The Cruel Sea). On the resumption of competitive football, Cornock joined Oldham Athletic, playing six times during the 1945–46 season. He then joined non-league Hereford United before joining Rochdale where he made one appearance in the Football League, a 2–0 defeat at home to Hartlepools United in November 1947. Having returned to Australia in 1948, Cornock made his Australian soccer debut for Corrimal in April 1949.

== Cricket career ==
Cornock was a right-handed batsman and a left-armed bowler, slightly below medium pace. In 1941 he set a league record score of 197 not out while playing for Royton Cricket Club against Ashton in the Central Lancashire Cricket League. He spent the 1948 season with Leicestershire scoring over 800 runs and taking 15 expensive wickets. Notable wickets included those of another footballing cricketer, Denis Compton, future England international Tom Graveney and contemporary England players John Dewes and Joe Hardstaff.

He returned to Australia at the end of the 1948 cricket season, and later joined the Cumberland Cricket Club in Australia. He captained the side during Richie Benaud's absences on national team duty during the 1959–60, 1960–61 and 1961–62 seasons and continued to play until his fifties. He was also both president and club-secretary at Cumberland and was responsible with son John for the building of a sightscreen on the club's ground. The ground is now home to the Parramatta Cricket Club and the sightscreen has been renamed in Cornock's honour.
