= Eddie Beynon =

Welsh footballer

Personal information
- Full name: Edwin Rees Beynon
- Date of birth: 17 November 1924
- Place of birth: Aberdare, Wales
- Date of death: 2002 (aged 77–78)
- Place of death: Merthyr Tydfil, Wales
- Position: Inside forward

Senior career*
Years	Team	Apps	(Gls)
1947–1952	Wrexham	72	(21)
1951–1955	Shrewsbury Town	91	(6)
- Wellington Town
- * Club domestic league appearances and goals

Edwin Rees Beynon (17 November 1924 – February 2002) was a Welsh professional footballer who played as an inside forward.

Beynon was a Wales Schoolboy International in youth and had represented the Royal Air Force at football while serving in the Second World War. He made appearances in the English Football League for Wrexham and Shrewsbury Town. After retiring from playing he was employed as a security officer and later as a driving instructor in London, returning to live at his native Aberdare after retiring from employment.
