= Archie Livingstone (footballer, born 1915) =

Scottish footballer

Personal information
- Full name: Archibald Livingstone
- Date of birth: 15 November 1915
- Place of birth: Pencaitland, Scotland
- Date of death: 12 August 1961 (aged 45)
- Place of death: Edinburgh, Scotland
- Height: 5 ft 7 1/2 in (1.71 m)
- Positions: Inside forward; right half

Senior career*
Years	Team	Apps	(Gls)
1932–1933	Musselburgh Lewisvale		
1933–1934	Ormiston Primrose		
1934–1935	Dundee	0	(0)
1935–1937	Newcastle United	33	(5)
1938–1939	Bury	24	(8)
1945–1946	Peterborough United	2	(2)
1946–1947	Everton	4	(2)
1947–1948	Southport	23	(2)
1948–1949	Glenavon		
1949–1950	Dundee	0	(0)
- Worksop Town

Managerial career
- 1948–1949: Glenavon (player-manager)
- * Club domestic league appearances and goals

Archibald Livingstone (15 November 1915 – 12 August 1961) was a Scottish professional footballer who played in the Football League for Newcastle United, Bury, Southport and Everton as an inside forward or right half. He player-managed Irish League club Glenavon.

== Career statistics ==
Appearances and goals by club, season and competition
Club	Season	League			National Cup		Total	
Club	Season	Division	Apps	Goals	Apps	Goals	Apps	Goals
Newcastle United	1935–36	Second Division	5	1	0	0	5	1
Newcastle United	1936–37	Second Division	15	1	0	0	15	1
Newcastle United	1937–38	Second Division	13	3	0	0	13	3
Newcastle United	Total		33	5	0	0	33	5
Peterborough United	1945–46	Midland League	2	2	―		2	2
Everton	1946–47	First Division	4	2	0	0	4	2
Southport	1947–48	Third Division South	24	2	2	0	26	2
Career total			63	11	2	0	65	11
