= Alick Robinson =

English footballer

Personal information
- Date of birth: 17 April 1906
- Place of birth: Leigh, England
- Date of death: 1977 (aged 70–71)
- Height: 5 ft 7 1/2 in (1.71 m)
- Position: Wing half

Senior career*
Years	Team	Apps	(Gls)
1926–1933	Bury	169	(4)
1933–1939	Burnley	204	(8)
- * Club domestic league appearances and goals

Alick Robinson (17 April 1906 – 1977) was an English professional footballer who played as a wing half.
