= Tommy Burdett =

English footballer

Personal information
- Full name: Thomas John Burdett
- Date of birth: 29 October 1915
- Place of birth: West Hartlepool, England
- Date of death: 2001 (aged 85–86)
- Height: 5 ft 9 in (1.75 m)
- Position: Forward

Senior career*
Years	Team	Apps	(Gls)
–	Wheatley Hill		
1933–1935	Hull City	3	(0)
1935–1936	Fulham	0	(0)
1936–1939	Lincoln City	27	(12)
1939–19??	Bury	0	(0)
- * Club domestic league appearances and goals

Thomas John Burdett (29 October 1915 – 2001) was an English footballer who scored 12 goals from 30 appearances in the Football League playing for Hull City and Lincoln City. He was also on the books of Fulham and Bury, without playing in the league. He played as a forward.
