= Cyril Lawrence =

English footballer (1920–2020)

Personal information
- Date of birth: 12 June 1920
- Place of birth: Salford, England
- Date of death: 14 April 2020 (aged 99)
- Place of death: Farnworth, England
- Position: Winger

Senior career*
Years	Team	Apps	(Gls)
1938–1939	Blackpool	0	(0)
1947–1950	Rochdale	44	(5)
1950–1952	Wrexham	50	(9)
- * Club domestic league appearances and goals

Cyril Lawrence (12 June 1920 – 14 April 2020) was an English professional footballer who played as a winger. He played in the English football league for Blackpool, Rochdale and Wrexham.

During World War II, Lawrence enlisted in the Royal Navy and was posted to the King George V-class battleship as a gunner. He saw service in the Atlantic, Mediterranean, Arctic and Pacific, in the pursuit and destruction of the German battleship Bismarck, on Arctic convoys to supply the Soviets, and at the Battle of Okinawa and the final surrender of the Japanese home islands.

He married his wife Clara in 1944, while on shore leave. After the war, he returned to his football career, transferring from Blackpool to Rochdale where he played between 1947 and 1950, before joining Wrexham for two years. He retired from his football career 1952. In 2017, aged 97, Lawrence visited Spotland Stadium, the home of Rochdale.

He died on 14 April 2020, aged 99, at Royal Bolton Hospital in Farnworth, Greater Manchester, after contracting COVID-19 disease during the pandemic.
