= Jim Pearce (footballer) =

Welsh footballer

Personal information
- Full name: James Pearce
- Date of birth: 13 September 1909
- Place of birth: Chirk, Wales
- Date of death: 1986 (aged 76–77)
- Height: 5 ft 11 in (1.80 m)
- Position: Centre half

Senior career*
Years	Team	Apps	(Gls)
- Chirk
- Royal Tank Corps
1932–1934	Wrexham	0	(0)
1934–1939	Bristol City	148	(2)
1939	Rochdale	3	(0)
1946–19??	Cardiff City	0	(0)

International career
19??	Wales Amateur		
- * Club domestic league appearances and goals

James Pearce (13 September 1909 – 1986) was a Welsh footballer who played as a centre half. He made over 150 Football League appearances in the years before the Second World War.

== Career ==
Pearce played locally for Chirk and for the Royal Tank Corps in the Army, and was on the books of Wrexham on amateur terms. Bob Hewison signed Pearce in August 1934 for Bristol City. Pearce joined Rochdale in May 1939. Pearce represented the Army during wartime service in Greece and the Middle East. In 1946 he joined Cardiff City without making a return to first-team football.
