= Joe Davison (footballer, born 1919) =

English footballer

Personal information
- Date of birth: 29 July 1919
- Place of birth: Newcastle upon Tyne, England
- Date of death: 1983 (aged 63–64)
- Position: Full back

Senior career*
| Years | Team | Apps | (Gls) |
| – | Throckley Welfare | | |
| 1946–1954 | Darlington | 240 | (8) |
| – | North Shields | | |
- * Club domestic league appearances and goals

Joe Davison (29 July 1919 – 1983) was an English footballer who made 240 appearances in the Football League playing as a full back for Darlington in the years following the Second World War. He was born in Newcastle upon Tyne, and also played non-league football for Throckley Welfare and North Shields.
