= Arthur Richardson (footballer, born 1913) =

English footballer

Arthur Joseph Richardson
Personal information
- Full name: Arthur Richardson
- Date of birth: 15 January 1913
- Place of birth: Wigan, England
- Date of death: September 1993 (aged 80)
- Place of death: Chesterfield, England
- Position: Centre forward

Senior career*
| Years | Team | Apps | (Gls) |
| 1936–1938 | Burnley | 11 | (2) |
| 1938–1939 | Chesterfield | 4 | (1) |
| 1939-1940 | Rochdale A.F.C | 15 | (15) |
- * Club domestic league appearances and goals

Arthur Joseph Richardson (15 January 1913 – 1993) was an English professional footballer who played as a centre forward. After playing for Rochdale A.F.C as a wartime guest player he later joined the British Army during World War 2, in which he was wounded, being shot in the arm.

Arthur married Eileen Kelly in October 1939 in Chesterfield and later had 2 children.
