= Henry Hawkins (cricketer) =

English cricketer (1876–1930)

Henry Hawkins (1876–1930) was an English cricketer active from 1902 to 1909 who played for Northamptonshire (Northants). He was born in Kegworth, Leicestershire on 15 January 1876 and died in Daventry, Northamptonshire on 12 August 1930. He appeared in 26 first-class matches as a righthanded batsman who bowled right arm fast medium. He scored 350 runs with a highest score of 33 and took 24 wickets with a best performance of two for 12.
