= George Stillyards =

English footballer

Personal information
- Full name: George Edward William Stillyards
- Date of birth: 29 December 1918
- Place of birth: Whisby, England
- Date of death: 9 January 2010 (aged 91)
- Place of death: Leasingham, England
- Position: Full back

Senior career*
Years	Team	Apps	(Gls)
- Lincoln Rovers
- Botolph United
1942–1949	Lincoln City	100	(1)
- Stalybridge Celtic
- Skegness Town
1953	Grantham Town	1	(0)
- Brigg Town
- * Club domestic league appearances and goals

George Edward William Stillyards (29 December 1918 – 9 January 2010) was an English professional footballer who made 100 appearances in the Football League playing for Lincoln City. He played as a full back.

== Life and career ==
Stillyards was born in Whisby, Lincolnshire, and joined Lincoln City during the Second World War. He went on to help the club to promotion to the Second Division in the 1947–48 season, and made his 100th Football League appearance, and last appearance for Lincoln, in August 1949. He later played for Stalybridge Celtic, Grantham Town and Brigg Town, and was player-manager of Skegness Town, playing as a centre-half rather than his normal right-back position. He was described as "not a dirty player, but he took few prisoners".

He played cricket for Lincolnshire in the Minor Counties Championship in 1950.

Stillyards was working as a machinist for Ruston's when he married May in Washingborough in 1944. The couple had three daughters. After retiring from football, Stillyards resumed his employment at Ruston's, and later became a bookmaker. He played bowls until well into his eighties. He died at home in Leasingham, Sleaford, Lincolnshire, in January 2010 at the age of 91.
