= Louis Armitage =

English footballer

Personal information
- Full name: Louis Greaves Armitage
- Date of birth: 15 December 1921
- Place of birth: Kingston upon Hull, England
- Date of death: September 2000 (aged 78)
- Position: Inside forward

Senior career*
Years	Team	Apps	(Gls)
1940–1948	Rotherham United	15	(9)
1948	Grimsby Town	8	(2)
- * Club domestic league appearances and goals

Louis Greaves Armitage (15 December 1921 – September 2000) was an English professional footballer who played as an inside forward.
