= Jimmy Britton =

English footballer (1920–1980)

Personal information
- Full name: James Britton
- Date of birth: 27 May 1920
- Place of birth: Salford, England
- Date of death: December 1980 (aged 60)
- Place of death: Lancaster, England
- Position: Left half

Senior career*
Years	Team	Apps	(Gls)
- Lowestoft Town
1946–1947	Bradford (Park Avenue)	1	(0)
1947–1949	Rochdale	20	(0)
- Mossley
Total		21	(0)
- * Club domestic league appearances and goals

James Britton (27 May 1920 – December 1980) was an English professional footballer who played as a left half for Bradford (Park Avenue) and Rochdale.
