= Des Collins =

English footballer

Personal information
- Full name: Albert Desmond Collins
- Date of birth: 15 April 1923
- Place of birth: Chesterfield, England
- Date of death: 17 July 2017 (aged 94)
- Place of death: Newbold, Derbyshire, England
- Position: Outside right

Senior career*
Years	Team	Apps	(Gls)
194?–1946	Chesterfield	8	(0)
1946–1947	Halifax Town	44	(10)
1947–1948	Carlisle United	19	(3)
1948–1950	Barrow	55	(7)
1950–1951	Bournemouth & Boscombe Athletic	5	(1)
1951–1952	Shrewsbury Town	9	(2)
1952–1953	Accrington Stanley	17	(2)
1953–1954	Boston United	43	(9)
Total		200	(34)
- * Club domestic league appearances and goals

Albert Desmond Collins (15 April 1923 – 17 June 2017) was an English professional footballer who played as an outside right in the Football League for Chesterfield, Halifax Town, Carlisle United, Barrow, Bournemouth & Boscombe Athletic, Shrewsbury Town and Accrington Stanley. He also played in the Midland Football League for Boston United.
