= Jim Sample =

English footballer

Personal information
- Full name: James Sample
- Date of birth: 5 November 1921
- Place of birth: Morpeth, England
- Date of death: 7 January 1992 (aged 70)
- Place of death: Bradford, England
- Position: Inside forward

Senior career*
Years	Team	Apps	(Gls)
- Ashington
1947–1948	Bradford City	8	(2)
Total		8	(2)
- * Club domestic league appearances and goals

James Sample (5 November 1921 – 7 January 1992) was an English professional footballer who played as an inside forward.

== Career ==
Born in Morpeth, Sample moved from Ashington to Bradford City in August 1947, scoring 2 goals in 8 league appearances for the club, before being released in 1948.

== Sources ==
- Frost, Terry (1988). Bradford City A Complete Record 1903-1988. Breedon Books Sport. ISBN 0-907969-38-0.
