= Les Horton =

English footballer

Personal information
- Full name: Leslie Horton
- Date of birth: 12 July 1921
- Place of birth: Salford, Lancashire, England
- Date of death: January 2008 (aged 86)
- Place of death: Wigan, Greater Manchester, England
- Height: 5 ft 8 in (1.73 m)
- Position: Half-back

Senior career*
Years	Team	Apps	(Gls)
- Tydesley United
1941–1943	Rochdale	0	(0)
1943–1948	Oldham Athletic	79	(2)
1948–1950	Carlisle United	66	(0)
1950	Rochdale	0	(0)
1950–1951	York City	21	(0)
1951–1952	Halifax Town	35	(1)
1952–	Ashton United		
Total		201	(3)

Managerial career
- 1952–: Ashton United
- * Club domestic league appearances and goals

Leslie Horton (12 July 1921 – January 2008) was an English professional footballer who played as a half-back in the Football League for Oldham Athletic, Carlisle United, York City, Halifax Town, in non-League football for Ashton United, and was on the books of Rochdale without making a league appearance. He was appointed player-manager of Ashton United in October 1952.
