= Stan Cutting =

English footballer

Personal information
- Full name: Stanley William Cutting
- Date of birth: 21 September 1914
- Place of birth: Norwich, England
- Date of death: 24 April 2004 (aged 89)
- Place of death: Exeter, England
- Height: 5 ft 8 in (1.73 m)
- Position: Right-half

Senior career*
Years	Team	Apps	(Gls)
1936–1937	Norwich City	0	(0)
1937–1939	Southampton	3	(0)
1939–1948	Exeter City	38	(2)
- * Club domestic league appearances and goals

Stanley William Cutting (21 September 1914 – 24 April 2004) was an English professional footballer who played at right-half for Southampton and Exeter City in the 1930s and 1940s.

== Football career ==
=== Southampton ===
Cutting was born in the St Faith's area of Norwich and represented Norwich & Norfolk Schools before joining Norwich City as a trainee.

In May 1937, he moved to the south coast to join Southampton who were managed by Tom Parker, who had moved from Norwich City two months earlier. Cutting spent most of his time at the Saints in the reserves and made his Football League debut when he took the place of Ray Parkin at right-half for the Second Division match against Chesterfield on 8 April 1939. The match was drawn 2–2 and Cutting retained his place for the next match, a 4–0 defeat at The Dell by Luton Town. Parker then tried youngster, Eric Webber at right-half before Parkin's return, although Cutting did play in the final match of the season, a 2–0 defeat at Plymouth Argyle.

In the 1939 close season, Cutting was transferred to Exeter City with his football career being interrupted by the Second World War.

=== Wartime service ===
During the Second World War, Cutting was enlisted by the Royal Air Force and posted to Egypt, where he represented the Suez Canal Zone against the Cairo Zone. He later saw service in India, where he played for the RAF against an All India XI at Lahore.

During the war, he also guested for various Football League clubs, including Blackpool, Stockport County, Rochdale and Millwall.

=== Exeter City ===
Cutting played for two seasons (1946–47 and 1947–48) for Exeter City in the Third Division South, making 38 appearances, scoring twice.

In 1948, he became assistant trainer and remained on the coaching staff at St James Park until 1953. He continued to play from time to time in the reserves; in January 1949, he score a hat-trick of penalties in a Southern League match against Worcester City.

== Later career ==
Following his retirement, Cutting became a hotelier in Exeter, firstly at the Globe Inn and later at the Crown and Sceptre.
