= Sam Earl =

English footballer

Personal information
- Full name: Albert Thomas Earl
- Date of birth: 10 February 1915
- Place of birth: Gateshead, County Durham, England
- Date of death: 2000
- Height: 5 ft 8 in (1.73 m)
- Positions: Inside forward; winger

Senior career*
Years	Team	Apps	(Gls)
–1932	Dunston CWS		
1932–1936	Bury	35	(7)
1936–1937	Rhyl Athletic		
1937–1939	York City	58	(9)
1939–	Hartlepools United	0	(0)
1946–1947	Stockport County	42	(12)
1947–1948	Rochdale	4	(1)
1948	New Brighton	9	(1)
1948–	Northwich Victoria		
Total		148	(30)
- * Club domestic league appearances and goals

Albert Thomas "Sam" Earl (10 February 1915 – 2000) was an English professional footballer who played as an inside forward or a winger in the Football League for Bury, York City, Stockport County, Rochdale and New Brighton, in non-League football for Dunston CWS, Rhyl Athletic and Northwich Victoria and was on the books of Hartlepools United without making a league appearance.
