= Jack Hall (footballer, born 1912) =

English footballer

John Hall (23 October 1912 – August 2000) was an English footballer who played as a goalkeeper. Born in Failsworth, Lancashire, he played for Failsworth Dynamoes, Manchester United, Tottenham Hotspur, Stalybridge Celtic and Runcorn, as well as guesting for several teams during the Second World War.
