= George Glaister =

English footballer (1918–1966)

Personal information
- Date of birth: 18 May 1918
- Place of birth: Bywell, England
- Date of death: 1966 (aged 47–48)
- Place of death: Lancashire, England
- Position: Left winger

Senior career*
Years	Team	Apps	(Gls)
19xx–1946	North Shields	?	(?)
1940s	→ Manchester United (guest)	?	(?)
1940s	→ Watford (guest)	?	(?)
1946–1947	Blackburn Rovers	8	(1)
1947–1950	Stockport County	92	(21)
1950–1951	Halifax Town	34	(7)
1951–1952	Accrington Stanley	24	(1)
1952–19xx	Bangor City	?	(?)
Total		158	(30)
- * Club domestic league appearances and goals

George Glaister (18 May 1918 – 1966) was an English professional footballer who played as a left winger. Glaister made a total of 158 appearances in the Football League between 1946 and 1952, scoring 30 goals.

== Career ==
Born in Bywell, Glaister began his career with North Shields, and guested for Manchester United and Watford during the Second World War. He later played in the Football League for Blackburn Rovers, Stockport County, Halifax Town and Accrington Stanley. Glaister later played for Welsh club Bangor City. He also played nine times for Gloucester City.
