= Arthur Chesters =

English footballer

Arthur Chesters (14 February 1910 – 23 March 1963) was an English footballer. His regular position was as a goalkeeper. He was born in Salford, Lancashire. He played for Exeter City, Crystal Palace and Manchester United. He stood 5 ft 10 in (1.78 m) tall.
