= Peter Robertson (footballer, born 1908) =

Scottish footballer (1908–1964)

Personal information
- Full name: Peter Robertson
- Date of birth: February 1908
- Place of birth: Dundee, Scotland
- Date of death: 1964 (aged 55–56)
- Position: Goalkeeper

Senior career*
Years	Team	Apps	(Gls)
1926–1927	Lochee United		
1927–1929	Dundee		
1929–1933	Charlton Athletic	117	(0)
1933–1934	Crystal Palace	4	(0)
1934–1935	Dundee United		
1935–1936	Brechin City		
1936–1939	Arbroath		
1939–1940	Rochdale	3	(0)
Total		124	(0)
- * Club domestic league appearances and goals

Peter Robertson (February 1908 – 1964) was a Scottish footballer who played in the Football League for Charlton Athletic, Crystal Palace and Rochdale.
