= Roland Bartholomew =

English footballer

Personal information
- Date of birth: 15 January 1915
- Place of birth: Great Harwood, England
- Date of death: 8 December 1991 (aged 76)
- Place of death: Trafford, Manchester, England
- Height: 5 ft 6 in (1.68 m)
- Position: Outside left

Youth career
- North Manchester Secondary School
- Urmston Old Boys

Senior career*
Years	Team	Apps	(Gls)
1934–1945	Leeds United	0	(0)
1935–1938	Bradford City	100	(14)
1938–1939	Grimsby Town	12	(4)
Total		112	(18)
- * Club domestic league appearances and goals

Roland Bartholomew (15 January 1915 – 8 December 1991) was an English professional footballer who played as an outside left.

== Career ==
Born in Great Harwood, Bartholomew grew up in Manchester and played for North Manchester Secondary School and Urmston Old Boys. He signed amateur forms for Leeds United in 1934, but never played a first-team game for the club. He moved from Leeds United to Bradford City in May 1935; he moved from Bradford City to Grimsby Town in June 1938. For Bradford City, he made 100 appearances in the Football League, scoring 14 goals; he also scored 7 goals in 10 FA Cup appearances. He played in every League game of the 1936–37 season for Bradford City. Bartholomew scored four goals in 12 League appearances for Grimsby Town, before World War Two ended his career.

== Sources ==
- Frost, Terry (1988). Bradford City A Complete Record 1903-1988. Breedon Books Sport. ISBN 0-907969-38-0.
