= Jimmy Cunliffe =

English footballer (1912–1986)

Personal information
- Full name: James Nathaniel Cunliffe
- Date of birth: 5 July 1912
- Place of birth: Blackrod, England
- Date of death: 21 November 1986 (aged 74)
- Place of death: Bolton, England
- Height: 5 ft 10 in (1.78 m)
- Position: Inside forward

Youth career
- Haslingden
- Adlington

Senior career*
Years	Team	Apps	(Gls)
1930–1946	Everton	174	(73)
- → Everton (war guest)
- → Bolton Wanderers (war guest)
- → Rochdale (war guest)
1946–1947	Rochdale	2	(0)
Total		176	(73)

International career
1936	England	1	(0)
- * Club domestic league appearances and goals

James Nathaniel Cunliffe (5 July 1912 – 21 November 1986) was an English footballer who played as an inside forward.

== Career ==
Born in Blackrod, Cunliffe played club football for Haslingden, Adlington, Everton and Rochdale.

Prior to his football career he worked as an apprentice plater at the Horwich Locomotive Works. For Everton he scored on his debut in March 1933. During World War II he guested for Everton, Bolton Wanderers, and Rochdale.

Cunliffe also earned one cap for the England national side on 9 May 1936. His cousin was Arthur Cunliffe, also a footballer.

He was married, with one son and one grandson, both also called James. After retirement he returned to the Horwich Locomotive Works, to work in the spring smithy section. He also played professional crown green bowls, a sport he had played as an amateur during his football career.

He died at his home on 26 November 1986 following a stroke, aged 74.
