= Tom Dooley (footballer) =

English footballer

Personal information
- Full name: Thomas Edward Dooley
- Date of birth: 15 December 1914
- Place of birth: Accrington, England
- Date of death: 1975 (aged 60–61)
- Height: 5 ft 7 3/4 in (1.72 m)
- Position: Right half

Senior career*
Years	Team	Apps	(Gls)
- Bacup Borough
1934	Blackpool	0	(0)
- Bacup Borough
1938–1939	Accrington Stanley	31	(2)
- Rochdale
- * Club domestic league appearances and goals

Thomas Edward Dooley (15 December 1914 – 1975) was an English professional footballer. A right half, he played for his hometown club, Accrington Stanley. He was also on the books of Blackpool, but did not feature for the first team, and Rochdale.
