= Harry Lamb =

English footballer (1925–1982)

Personal information
- Full name: Harry Edward Lamb
- Date of birth: 3 June 1925
- Place of birth: Bebington, England
- Date of death: 9 August 1982 (aged 57)
- Place of death: Bebington, England
- Position: Inside forward

Senior career*
Years	Team	Apps	(Gls)
1947–1953	Tranmere Rovers	88	(12)
- * Club domestic league appearances and goals

Harry Edward Lamb (3 June 1925 – 9 August 1982) was an English footballer, who played as an inside forward in the Football League for Tranmere Rovers.
