= Cliff Chadwick =

English footballer

Personal information
- Full name: Clifton Chadwick
- Date of birth: 26 January 1914
- Place of birth: Bolton, England
- Date of death: 8 March 1999 (aged 85)
- Position: Winger

Senior career*
Years	Team	Apps	(Gls)
- Turton
- Fleetwood
1933–1934	Oldham Athletic	18	(6)
1934–1946	Middlesbrough	96	(27)
1946–1947	Hull City	23	(7)
1947–1948	Darlington	37	(5)
1948–195?	Stockton		

Managerial career
- 1948–195?: Stockton (player-manager)
- * Club domestic league appearances and goals

Clifton Chadwick (26 January 1914 – 8 March 1999) was a footballer who scored 45 goals from 174 appearances in the Football League playing as a winger for Oldham Athletic, Middlesbrough, Hull City and Darlington in the 1930s and 1940s. He went on to be player-manager of Stockton.
