= Geoffrey Glaister =

Geoffrey Ashall Glaister (1917–1985) of Leeds was a librarian with the British Council who wrote several important works of reference relating to the history of the manufacture of books.

His publication Encyclopedia of the Book has over 3,000 definitions of the terms used in the book trade.

Glaister began his career in librarianship in 1934 at Bradford Public Libraries. He served in more than fourteen countries with the British Council. Glaister was a life member of the Bibliographical Society and the Printing History Society.

On his death, he left half of his £122,645 estate to the British Council Benevolent Fund.

== Selected publications ==
- Glossary of the Book. London: George Allen & Unwin, 1960. (Published in the United States simultaneously as the Encyclopedia of the Book, Cleveland, World Publishing Company.)
- Encyclopedia of the Book. 2nd edn. New Castle, DE, and London: Oak Knoll Press & The British Library, 1996. ISBN 1884718140 (With a new introduction by Donald Farren)
