= Duncan Colquhoun =

Scottish association football player (1915–2005)

Personal information
- Full name: Duncan Morton Colquhoun
- Date of birth: 24 July 1915
- Place of birth: Glen Fruin, Scotland
- Date of death: 26 July 2005 (aged 90)
- Place of death: Wigan, England
- Position: Forward

Youth career
- Dunoon Athletic

Senior career*
Years	Team	Apps	(Gls)
1932–1933	Fulham	0	(0)
1933–1934	Millwall	0	(0)
1934	Raith Rovers		
1934	Dumbarton	3	(0)
1934–1935	Sheffield Wednesday	0	(0)
1935	Hartlepools United	0	(0)
1935	Queen of the South		
1935–1937	Wigan Athletic	85	(23)
1937–1938	Bristol City	3	(0)
1938–1939	Southport	36	(9)
1939	Bradford City	0	(0)
1945–1949	Wigan Athletic	46	(16)
- * Club domestic league appearances and goals

Duncan Morton Colquhoun (24 July 1915 – 26 July 2005) was a Scottish footballer who played as a forward.

A junior with Dunoon Athletic, Colquhoun signed with several Football League clubs during the mid-1930s, including Fulham, Millwall, Sheffield Wednesday and Hartlepools United, but failed to make a league appearance. He was signed by Wigan Athletic from Queen of the South, and spent three seasons at the club before joining Bristol City in November 1937.

Colquhoun returned to Wigan Athletic after the Second World War.

In recognition of his long service at the club, he was awarded a joint testimonial match with Kenny Banks in 1984.
