= 1938–39 Rochdale A.F.C. season =

English football club season

Rochdale
1938–39 season
- Manager: Sam Jennings; Ted Goodier
- Stadium: Spotland Stadium
- Football League Third Division North: 15th
- FA Cup: 1st Round
- Top goalscorer: League: Jimmy Wynn (28); All: Jimmy Wynn (29)
Home colours

The 1938–39 season saw Rochdale A.F.C.'s 32nd in existence and their 18th in the Football League Third Division North.

== Squad Statistics ==
=== Appearances and goals ===
No.	Pos	Nat	Player	Total		Division 3 North		FA Cup		Division 3 North Cup	
No.	Pos	Nat	Player	Apps	Goals	Apps	Goals	Apps	Goals	Apps	Goals
	GK	(England) ENG	Des Fawcett	13	0	13	0	0	0	0	0
	DF	(Scotland) SCO	Tommy Baird	39	0	37	0	1	0	1	0
	DF	(Scotland) SCO	Tom Sneddon	32	0	31	0	0	0	1	0
	FW	(England) ENG	Joe Duff	43	15	41	14	1	1	1	0
	MF	(England) ENG	Ted Goodier	29	2	28	1	1	1	0	0
	MF	(England) ENG	Fred Reeve	29	3	27	3	1	0	1	0
	MF	(England) ENG	Harry Howarth	4	0	4	0	0	0	0	0
	FW	(Scotland) SCO	Tom Douglas	8	0	8	0	0	0	0	0
	MF	(England) ENG	Richard Haworth	9	1	9	1	0	0	0	0
	FW	(England) ENG	Syd Goodfellow	43	2	41	2	1	0	1	0
	FW	(Wales) WAL	Arthur Griffiths	14	5	14	5	0	0	0	0
	DF	(Scotland) SCO	William Keenan	9	0	9	0	0	0	0	0
	FW	(Scotland) SCO	William Royan	5	1	5	1	0	0	0	0
	MF	(Scotland) SCO	Archie Young	1	0	1	0	0	0	0	0
	FW	(England) ENG	Jimmy Wynn	38	29	36	28	1	1	1	0
	MF	(England) ENG	John Barratt	1	0	1	0	0	0	0	0
	MF	(England) ENG	Albert Gregory	9	0	9	0	0	0	0	0
	DF	(England) ENG	Ernest Hobbs	6	0	6	0	0	0	0	0
	GK	(Scotland) SCO	Tommy Doyle	31	0	29	0	1	0	1	0
	MF	(England) ENG	Reg Kilsby	25	6	23	6	1	0	1	0
	FW	(England) ENG	Tommy Prest	22	6	21	6	1	0	0	0
	MF	(England) ENG	Georgie Mee	2	0	1	0	1	0	0	0
	MF	(Scotland) SCO	John Latimer	1	0	1	0	0	0	0	0
	MF	(England) ENG	Wally Reynolds	23	4	22	4	0	0	1	0
	MF	(England) ENG	Peter Vause	21	13	20	13	0	0	1	0
	FW	(England) ENG	Joe Firth	18	6	18	6	0	0	0	0
	FW	(England) ENG	Jack Briggs	1	0	1	0	0	0	0	0
	MF	(Wales) WAL	Bryn Lewis	1	0	1	0	0	0	0	0
	FW	(England) ENG	John Gastall	4	1	4	1	0	0	0	0
	DF	(England) ENG	John Neary	1	0	1	0	0	0	0	0
	MF	(England) ENG	Henry Roberts	1	0	0	0	1	0	0	0
	FW	(England) ENG	Harold Knowles	1	1	0	0	0	0	1	1
			J. Kennedy	0	0	0	0	0	0	0	0

Squad Statistics (Non-competitive)

=== Appearances and goals (Non-competitive) ===
No.	Pos	Nat	Player	Total		Lancashire Cup		Football League Jubilee	
No.	Pos	Nat	Player	Apps	Goals	Apps	Goals	Apps	Goals
	GK	(England) ENG	Des Fawcett	2	0	1	0	1	0
	DF	(Scotland) SCO	Tommy Baird	3	0	2	0	1	0
	DF	(Scotland) SCO	Tom Sneddon	4	0	2	0	2	0
	FW	(England) ENG	Joe Duff	4	1	3	1	1	0
	MF	(England) ENG	Ted Goodier	5	0	3	0	2	0
	MF	(England) ENG	Fred Reeve	5	1	3	0	2	1
	MF	(England) ENG	Harry Howarth	1	1	0	0	1	1
	FW	(Scotland) SCO	Tom Douglas	2	1	0	0	2	1
	MF	(England) ENG	Richard Haworth	4	0	3	0	1	0
	FW	(England) ENG	Syd Goodfellow	5	2	3	0	2	2
	FW	(Wales) WAL	Arthur Griffiths	3	0	2	0	1	0
	DF	(Scotland) SCO	William Keenan	2	0	1	0	1	0
	FW	(Scotland) SCO	William Royan	2	0	1	0	1	0
	MF	(Scotland) SCO	Archie Young	0	0	0	0	0	0
	FW	(England) ENG	Jimmy Wynn	3	1	2	1	1	0
	MF	(England) ENG	John Barratt	3	0	2	0	1	0
	MF	(England) ENG	Albert Gregory	1	0	1	0	0	0
	DF	(England) ENG	Ernest Hobbs	1	0	1	0	0	0
	GK	(Scotland) SCO	Tommy Doyle	3	0	2	0	1	0
	MF	(England) ENG	Reg Kilsby	3	1	2	1	1	0
	FW	(England) ENG	Tommy Prest	0	0	0	0	0	0
	MF	(England) ENG	Georgie Mee	1	0	1	0	0	0
	MF	(Scotland) SCO	John Latimer	0	0	0	0	0	0
	MF	(England) ENG	Wally Reynolds	0	0	0	0	0	0
	MF	(England) ENG	Peter Vause	0	0	0	0	0	0
	FW	(England) ENG	Joe Firth	0	0	0	0	0	0
	FW	(England) ENG	Jack Briggs	0	0	0	0	0	0
	MF	(Wales) WAL	Bryn Lewis	0	0	0	0	0	0
	FW	(England) ENG	John Gastall	0	0	0	0	0	0
	DF	(England) ENG	John Neary	0	0	0	0	0	0
	MF	(England) ENG	Henry Roberts	0	0	0	0	0	0
	FW	(England) ENG	Harold Knowles	0	0	0	0	0	0
			J. Kennedy	1	1	0	0	1	1

== Final league table ==
Pos	Team	Pld	W	D	L	GF	GA	GAv	Pts
13	Barrow	42	16	9	17	66	65	1.015	41
14	Wrexham	42	17	7	18	66	79	0.835	41
15	Rochdale	42	15	9	18	92	82	1.122	39
16	New Brighton	42	15	9	18	68	73	0.932	39
17	Lincoln City	42	12	9	21	66	92	0.717	33

Source: rsssf.com

== Competitions ==
=== Football League Third Division North ===
27 August 1938 1	Rotherham United	7–1	Rochdale	Rotherham
	Branham; Hanson; Clarke; Bastow	Report	Griffiths	Stadium: Millmoor; Attendance: 7438

30 August 1938 2	Rochdale	2–3	Carlisle United	Rochdale
	Griffiths; Haworth	Report	Murphy; Ashton (pen.)	Stadium: Spotland Stadium; Attendance: 5217

3 September 1938 3	Rochdale	1–2	Oldham Athletic	Rochdale
	Royan	Report	Ferrier; Halford	Stadium: Spotland Stadium; Attendance: 7357

6 September 1938 4	Rochdale	1–1	Doncaster Rovers	Rochdale
	Goodfellow	Report	Perry	Stadium: Spotland Stadium; Attendance: 4469

10 September 1938 5	Rochdale	2–2	York City	Rochdale
	Goodfellow; Griffiths	Report	Hughes; Scott	Stadium: Spotland Stadium; Attendance: 5494

12 September 1938 6	Doncaster Rovers	5–0	Rochdale	Doncaster
	Perry; Little; Killourhy (pen.)	Report		Stadium: Belle Vue; Attendance: 5530

17 September 1938 7	Wrexham	1–0	Rochdale	Wrexham
	Burditt	Report		Stadium: Racecourse Ground; Attendance: 3565

24 September 1938 8	Rochdale	5–2	Gateshead	Rochdale
	Duff; Griffiths; Wynn; Reeve; Conroy (o.g.)	Report	Embleton; Miller	Stadium: Spotland Stadium; Attendance: 6393

1 October 1938 9	Hartlepools United	4–2	Rochdale	Hartlepool
	Wigham; Woods; Self	Report	Wynn	Stadium: Victoria Park; Attendance: 4446

8 October 1938 10	Rochdale	6–1	Darlington	Rochdale
	Wynn; Reeve; Duff; Griffiths	Report	Armstrong	Stadium: Spotland Stadium; Attendance: 5232

15 October 1938 11	Halifax Town	2–1	Rochdale	Halifax
	Barkas; Widdowfield	Report	Kilsby	Stadium: The Shay; Attendance: 5626

22 October 1938 12	Rochdale	2–0	New Brighton	Rochdale
	Duff; Prest	Report		Stadium: Spotland Stadium; Attendance: 7292

29 October 1938 13	Barrow	3–1	Rochdale	Barrow-in-Furness
	Harris; Fletcher; Samuel	Report	Goodier	Stadium: Holker Street; Attendance: 6533

5 November 1938 14	Rochdale	5–2	Chester	Rochdale
	Kilsby; Wynn (pen.) (pen.); Duff	Report	Howarth; Pendergast	Stadium: Spotland Stadium; Attendance: 6732

12 November 1938 15	Bradford City	3–0	Rochdale	Bradford
	Swindells; Smailes	Report		Stadium: Valley Parade; Attendance: 6615

19 November 1938 16	Rochdale	4–0	Hull City	Rochdale
	Wynn; Reynolds; Prest	Report		Stadium: Spotland Stadium; Attendance: 6690

3 December 1938 17	Rochdale	0–1	Stockport County	Rochdale
		Report	Sargeant	Stadium: Spotland Stadium; Attendance: 6293

10 December 1938 18	Accrington Stanley	0–5	Rochdale	Accrington
		Report	Kilsby; Prest; Duff; Wynn (pen.)	Stadium: Peel Park; Attendance: 3836

17 December 1938 19	Rochdale	2–1	Barnsley	Rochdale
	Wynn; Prest	Report	Asquith	Stadium: Spotland Stadium; Attendance: 5466

24 December 1938 20	Rochdale	0–1	Rotherham United	Rochdale
		Report	Wadsworth	Stadium: Spotland Stadium; Attendance: 5811

26 December 1938 21	Southport	4–1	Rochdale	Southport
	Patrick; Colquhoun; Hawkins	Report	Vause	Stadium: Haig Avenue; Attendance: 6606

27 December 1938 22	Rochdale	5–0	Southport	Rochdale
	Duff; Wynn; Prest; Reynolds	Report		Stadium: Spotland Stadium; Attendance: 6293

31 December 1938 23	Oldham Athletic	1–2	Rochdale	Oldham
	Fielden	Report	Wynn; Reeve	Stadium: Boundary Park; Attendance: 11644

11 January 1939 24	Lincoln City	2–2	Rochdale	Lincoln
	Ponting; Hancock	Report	Duff	Stadium: Sincil Bank; Attendance: 1847

14 January 1939 25	York City	0–7	Rochdale	York
		Report	Vause; Firth; Wynn (pen.); Duff	Stadium: Bootham Crescent; Attendance: 3826

21 January 1939 26	Rochdale	0–0	Wrexham	Rochdale
		Report		Stadium: Spotland Stadium; Attendance: 7250

28 January 1939 27	Gateshead	2–2	Rochdale	Gateshead
	McDermott; Embleton	Report	Vause; Wynn	Stadium: Redheugh Park; Attendance: 2846

4 February 1939 28	Rochdale	3–4	Hartlepools United	Rochdale
	Wynn (pen.); Duff	Report	Robbins; Wigham; McGarry	Stadium: Spotland Stadium; Attendance: 5557

11 February 1939 29	Darlington	1–2	Rochdale	Darlington
	Feeney	Report	Firth	Stadium: Feethams; Attendance: 3011

18 February 1939 30	Rochdale	4–5	Halifax Town	Rochdale
	Wynn (pen.); Vause	Report	Widdowfield; Griffiths; Wood; Atack	Stadium: Spotland Stadium; Attendance: 6521

25 February 1939 31	New Brighton	3–1	Rochdale	New Brighton
	Frost; Wood	Report	Wynn	Stadium: Sandheys Park; Attendance: 3296

4 March 1939 32	Rochdale	2–2	Barrow	Rochdale
	Reynolds; Vause	Report	Samuel; Alcock	Stadium: Spotland Stadium; Attendance: 4734

11 March 1939 33	Chester	0–0	Rochdale	Chester
		Report		Stadium: Sealand Road; Attendance: 4375

18 March 1939 34	Rochdale	1–1	Bradford City	Rochdale
	Prest	Report	Hinsley	Stadium: Spotland Stadium; Attendance: 5651

25 March 1939 35	Hull City	3–3	Rochdale	Hull
	Richardson; Hubbard	Report	Duff; Wynn; Vause	Stadium: Anlaby Road; Attendance: 3975

1 April 1939 36	Rochdale	4–0	Lincoln City	Rochdale
	Wynn; Vause; Kilsby	Report		Stadium: Spotland Stadium; Attendance: 4314

7 April 1939 37	Crewe Alexandra	4–1	Rochdale	Crewe
	Cobourne; Chandler; Goodfellow (o.g.)	Report	Firth	Stadium: Gresty Road; Attendance: 6678

8 April 1939 38	Stockport County	1–2	Rochdale	Stockport
	Sargeant	Report	Wynn; Vause	Stadium: Edgeley Park; Attendance: 6485

10 April 1939 39	Rochdale	5–0	Crewe Alexandra	Rochdale
	Wynn; Vause; Firth; Gastall	Report		Stadium: Spotland Stadium; Attendance: 7786

15 April 1939 40	Rochdale	4–1	Accrington Stanley	Rochdale
	Duff; Vause; Wynn	Report	Waring	Stadium: Spotland Stadium; Attendance: 3981

22 April 1939 41	Barnsley	2–0	Rochdale	Barnsley
	McGarry	Report		Stadium: Oakwell; Attendance: 8403

29 April 1939 42	Carlisle United	5–1	Rochdale	Carlisle
	Ashton; Beresford; Hunt (pen.)	Report	Reynolds	Stadium: Brunton Park; Attendance: 2800

=== F.A. Cup ===
26 November 1938 1	Halifax Town	7–3	Rochdale	Halifax
	Jackson; Widdowfield; Wood	Report	Wynn; Duff; Goodier	Stadium: The Shay; Attendance: 10000

=== Football League Third Division North Cup ===
2 January 1939 1	Accrington Stanley	2–1	Rochdale	Accrington
	Alexander; Waring		Knowles	Stadium: Peel Park; Attendance: 1600

== Lancashire Cup ==
21 September 1938 1	Oldham Athletic	0–0	Rochdale	Oldham
				Stadium: Boundary Park

11 October 1938 1	Rochdale	2–2	Oldham Athletic	Rochdale
	Duff; Wynn		Goal	Stadium: Spotland Stadium

18 October 1938 1	Rochdale	1–2	Oldham Athletic	Rochdale
	Kilsby		Goal	Stadium: Spotland Stadium

== Football League Jubilee ==
20 August 1938	Halifax Town	4–1	Rochdale	Halifax
	Goal		Kennedy	Stadium: The Shay

23 August 1938	Rochdale	5–1	Halifax Town	Rochdale
	Goodfellow (pen.) (pen.); Howarth; Douglas; Reeve		Goal	Stadium: Spotland Stadium
