= 1945–46 Rochdale A.F.C. season =

English football club season

Rochdale
1945–46 season
- Manager: Ted Goodier
- Stadium: Spotland Stadium
- Division 3 North West: 2nd
- F.A. Cup: 3rd Round
- Top goalscorer: League: Joe Hargreaves (18); All: Joe Hargreaves (24)

The 1945–46 season was Rochdale A.F.C.'s 39th in existence and their 7th and final season in the wartime league (Division 3 North West). The season consisted of 36 matches, 18 of which were in the First Championship, and the remainder were in the 2nd Championship and Division 3 North West Cup. Rochdale finished in second place in the first championship. This season also saw the return of the F.A. Cup, in which Rochdale reached the third round.

== Squad Statistics ==
=== Appearances and goals ===
No.	Pos	Nat	Player	Total		Division 3 NW League & Cup		F.A. Cup	
No.	Pos	Nat	Player	Apps	Goals	Apps	Goals	Apps	Goals
	GK		F. Olive	2	0	2	0	0	0
	GK	(England) ENG	Arthur Chesters	19	0	13	0	6	0
	GK	(England) ENG	Jack Breedon	4	0	4	0	0	0
	GK		John Kirk	4	0	4	0	0	0
	GK	(England) ENG	Ken Ashbridge	4	0	4	0	0	0
	GK	(Wales) WAL	John Jones	2	0	2	0	0	0
	GK		J. Walmsley	1	0	1	0	0	0
	GK		Robert Yates	1	0	1	0	0	0
	GK		Bill Roberts	5	0	5	0	0	0
	DF	(England) ENG	Syd Pomphrey	33	0	29	0	4	0
	DF		Clive	1	0	1	0	0	0
	DF		Len Jackson	5	0	5	0	0	0
	MF	(England) ENG	Joe Duff	23	4	18	4	5	0
	DF	(Scotland) SCO	Tom Sneddon	20	0	15	0	5	0
	DF	(England) ENG	Bill Byrom	5	0	5	0	0	0
	DF		Matthew Muir	1	0	1	0	0	0
	DF		George Lunn	1	0	1	0	0	0
	DF	(Wales) WAL	Gwyn Jones	4	0	4	0	0	0
	DF		Robert Griffiths	1	0	1	0	0	0
	MF		Joe McCormick	32	1	28	1	4	0
	MF	(England) ENG	Peter Molloy	4	0	4	0	0	0
	MF		Jack Higham	1	0	1	0	0	0
	DF	(England) ENG	Norman Richardson	1	0	1	0	0	0
	DF	(England) ENG	Charlie Hurst	5	0	5	0	0	0
	MF		William Whittle	4	0	4	0	0	0
	MF	(England) ENG	Don Partridge	20	0	14	0	6	0
	DF	(England) ENG	John Neary	8	0	6	0	2	0
	DF	(Wales) WAL	Jim Pearce	20	0	16	0	4	0
	DF	(England) ENG	Dick Neilson	3	0	3	0	0	0
	MF		Wally Birch	11	0	11	0	0	0
	DF	(England) ENG	George Haigh	3	0	3	0	0	0
	MF		J. Keddie	1	0	1	0	0	0
	MF		W. Hamilton	2	0	2	0	0	0
	MF		Jack Dobson	5	0	5	0	0	0
	MF		Tommy Howshall	1	0	1	0	0	0
	MF	(England) ENG	Arthur Jones	14	3	12	3	2	0
	MF	(England) ENG	Sammy Makin	21	6	19	5	2	1
	FW	(England) ENG	Ernie Toseland	3	2	3	2	0	0
	MF		Sam Baum	1	0	1	0	0	0
	MF		J. Kindred	1	0	1	0	0	0
	FW	(England) ENG	Joe Meek	4	1	4	1	0	0
	FW	(England) ENG	Billy Woods	13	2	11	1	2	1
	MF	(England) ENG	Jack Brindle	23	9	17	8	6	1
	FW	(England) ENG	Joe Hargreaves	27	24	21	18	6	6
	MF	(England) ENG	Eric Wood	32	10	28	9	4	1
	MF		T. Smith	1	0	1	0	0	0
	FW		John Reid	1	1	1	1	0	0
	FW	(England) ENG	Jimmy Constantine	3	4	3	4	0	0
	FW		Jack Harker	1	0	1	0	0	0
	FW	(England) ENG	Jack Livesey	1	1	1	1	0	0
	FW	(England) ENG	Alf Hanson	13	7	13	7	0	0
	FW		Harry Nuttall (jnr)	1	0	1	0	0	0
	FW	(Scotland) SCO	Joe Rodi	7	5	7	5	0	0
	FW		Fred Taylor	1	1	1	1	0	0
	FW	(England) ENG	Arthur Cunliffe	35	6	29	5	6	1
	MF	(England) ENG	Wally Reynolds	2	1	0	0	2	1

Squad Statistics (Non-competitive)

=== Appearances and goals (Non-competitive) ===
No.	Pos	Nat	Player	Total		Lancashire Cup	
No.	Pos	Nat	Player	Apps	Goals	Apps	Goals
	GK		F. Olive	1	0	1	0
	GK	(England) ENG	Arthur Chesters	0	0	0	0
	GK	(England) ENG	Jack Breedon	0	0	0	0
	GK		John Kirk	1	0	1	0
	GK	(England) ENG	Ken Ashbridge	0	0	0	0
	GK	(Wales) WAL	John Jones	0	0	0	0
	GK		J. Walmsley	0	0	0	0
	GK		Robert Yates	0	0	0	0
	GK		Bill Roberts	0	0	0	0
	DF	(England) ENG	Syd Pomphrey	2	0	2	0
	DF		Clive	0	0	0	0
	DF		Len Jackson	1	0	1	0
	MF	(England) ENG	Joe Duff	1	0	1	0
	DF	(Scotland) SCO	Tom Sneddon	0	0	0	0
	DF	(England) ENG	Bill Byrom	0	0	0	0
	DF		Matthew Muir	0	0	0	0
	DF		George Lunn	0	0	0	0
	DF	(Wales) WAL	Gwyn Jones	0	0	0	0
	DF		Robert Griffiths	0	0	0	0
	MF		Joe McCormick	2	0	2	0
	MF	(England) ENG	Peter Molloy	1	0	1	0
	MF		Jack Higham	0	0	0	0
	DF	(England) ENG	Norman Richardson	0	0	0	0
	DF	(England) ENG	Charlie Hurst	0	0	0	0
	MF		William Whittle	0	0	0	0
	MF	(England) ENG	Don Partridge	1	0	1	0
	DF	(England) ENG	John Neary	1	0	1	0
	DF	(Wales) WAL	Jim Pearce	0	0	0	0
	DF	(England) ENG	Dick Neilson	0	0	0	0
	MF		Wally Birch	0	0	0	0
	DF	(England) ENG	George Haigh	1	0	1	0
	MF		J. Keddie	0	0	0	0
	MF		W. Hamilton	0	0	0	0
	MF		Jack Dobson	0	0	0	0
	MF		Tommy Howshall	0	0	0	0
	MF	(England) ENG	Arthur Jones	1	0	1	0
	MF	(England) ENG	Sammy Makin	1	0	1	0
	FW	(England) ENG	Ernie Toseland	1	0	1	0
	MF		Sam Baum	0	0	0	0
	MF		J. Kindred	0	0	0	0
	FW	(England) ENG	Joe Meek	0	0	0	0
	FW	(England) ENG	Billy Woods	0	0	0	0
	MF	(England) ENG	Jack Brindle	1	1	1	1
	FW	(England) ENG	Joe Hargreaves	1	1	1	1
	MF	(England) ENG	Eric Wood	1	0	1	0
	MF		T. Smith	0	0	0	0
	FW		John Reid	0	0	0	0
	FW	(England) ENG	Jimmy Constantine	1	1	1	1
	FW		Jack Harker	0	0	0	0
	FW	(England) ENG	Jack Livesey	0	0	0	0
	FW	(England) ENG	Alf Hanson	2	0	2	0
	FW		Harry Nuttall (jnr)	0	0	0	0
	FW	(Scotland) SCO	Joe Rodi	0	0	0	0
	FW		Fred Taylor	1	0	1	0
	FW	(England) ENG	Arthur Cunliffe	0	0	0	0
	MF	(England) ENG	Wally Reynolds	0	0	0	0

== Competitions ==
=== Third Division North West League and Cup ===
25 August 1945 1	Wrexham	4–1	Rochdale	Wrexham
	Goal		Reid	Stadium: Racecourse Ground; Attendance: 6000

1 September 1945 2	Rochdale	3–1	Wrexham	Rochdale
	Constantine; Meek; Hanson		Goal	Stadium: Spotland Stadium; Attendance: 3289

8 September 1945 3	Rochdale	4–2	Oldham Athletic	Rochdale
	Constantine; Hanson		Goal	Stadium: Spotland Stadium; Attendance: 4097

15 September 1945 4	Oldham Athletic	2–1	Rochdale	Oldham
	Goal		Taylor	Stadium: Boundary Park; Attendance: 6278

22 September 1945 5	Stockport County	7–0	Rochdale	Stockport
	Goal			Stadium: Edgeley Park; Attendance: 4993

29 September 1945 6	Rochdale	4–2	Stockport County	Rochdale
	Livesey; Hanson; A. Jones		Goal	Stadium: Spotland Stadium; Attendance: 3724

6 October 1945 7	Southport	1–2	Rochdale	Southport
	Goal		Hargreaves	Stadium: Haig Avenue; Attendance: 3500

13 October 1945 8	Rochdale	5–0	Southport	Rochdale
	Hargreaves; Hanson			Stadium: Spotland Stadium; Attendance: 4804

20 October 1945 9	Rochdale	3–1	Chester	Rochdale
	Hargreaves; Brindle		Goal	Stadium: Spotland Stadium; Attendance: 6693

27 October 1945 10	Chester	3–3	Rochdale	Chester
	Goal		Brindle; A. Jones	Stadium: Sealand Road; Attendance: 4123

3 November 1945 11	Rochdale	3–0	Barrow	Rochdale
	Cunliffe; Hargreaves; A. Jones			Stadium: Spotland Stadium; Attendance: 4133

10 November 1945 12	Barrow	2–1	Rochdale	Barrow-in-Furness
	Goal		Brindle	Stadium: Holker Street; Attendance: 4387

1 December 1945 13	Crewe Alexandra	1–4	Rochdale	Crewe
	Goal		Brindle; Makin	Stadium: Gresty Road; Attendance: 3500

22 December 1945 14	Tranmere Rovers	3–2	Rochdale	Birkenhead
	Goal		Duff; Hargreaves	Stadium: Prenton Park; Attendance: 3000

25 December 1945 15	Rochdale	2–0	Accrington Stanley	Rochdale
	Brindle			Stadium: Spotland Stadium; Attendance: 7614

26 December 1945 16	Accrington Stanley	4–2	Rochdale	Accrington
	Goal		Duff	Stadium: Peel Park; Attendance: 8043

29 December 1945 17	Rochdale	3–2	Crewe Alexandra	Rochdale
	Hargreaves; Duff; Toseland		Goal	Stadium: Spotland Stadium; Attendance: 6849

12 January 1946 18	Rochdale	1–3	Southport	Rochdale
	Toseland		Goal	Stadium: Spotland Stadium; Attendance: 4377

19 January 1946 19	Chester	2–0	Rochdale	Chester
	Goal			Stadium: Sealand Road; Attendance: 1500

26 January 1946 20	Rochdale	6–1	Chester	Rochdale
	Walters (o.g.); Wood; Woods; Makin		Goal	Stadium: Spotland Stadium; Attendance: 2500

2 February 1946 21	Rochdale	2–3	Stockport County	Rochdale
	Wood; Burrows (o.g.)		Goal	Stadium: Spotland Stadium; Attendance: 3416

9 February 1946 22	Stockport County	2–2	Rochdale	Stockport
	Goal		Cunliffe; Makin	Stadium: Edgeley Park; Attendance: 6500

16 February 1946 23	Rochdale	2–2	Crewe Alexandra	Rochdale
	Wood		Goal	Stadium: Spotland Stadium; Attendance: 3816

23 February 1946 24	Crewe Alexandra	3–1	Rochdale	Crewe
	Goal		Hargreaves	Stadium: Gresty Road; Attendance: 3880

2 March 1946 25	Rochdale	1–2	Wrexham	Rochdale
	Hargreaves		Goal	Stadium: Spotland Stadium; Attendance: 3775

9 March 1946 26	Wrexham	2–1	Rochdale	Wrexham
	Goal		Hargreaves	Stadium: Racecourse Ground; Attendance: 6800

16 March 1946 27	Southport	0–2	Rochdale	Southport
			Hargreaves; Cunliffe	Stadium: Haig Avenue; Attendance: 3500

23 March 1946 28	Rochdale	2–1	Barrow	Rochdale
	Makin; Wood		Goal	Stadium: Spotland Stadium; Attendance: 2100

30 March 1946 29	Barrow	1–2	Rochdale	Barrow-in-Furness
	Goal		Rodi; Hargreaves	Stadium: Holker Street; Attendance: 4014

6 April 1946 30	Rochdale	2–3	Lincoln City	Rochdale
	Rodi; Hargreaves		Goal	Stadium: Spotland Stadium; Attendance: 4128

13 April 1946 31	Lincoln City	1–2	Rochdale	Lincoln
	Goal		Rodi; McCormick	Stadium: Sincil Bank; Attendance: 4942

19 April 1946 32	Rochdale	0–0	Tranmere Rovers	Rochdale
				Stadium: Spotland Stadium; Attendance: 3243

20 April 1946 33	Rochdale	3–1	Oldham Athletic	Rochdale
	Cunliffe; Hargreaves; Wood		Goal	Stadium: Spotland Stadium; Attendance: 4200

22 April 1946 34	Oldham Athletic	0–4	Rochdale	Oldham
			Hargreaves; Cunliffe; Rodi	Stadium: Boundary Park; Attendance: 5800

27 April 1946 35	Southport	2–0	Rochdale	Southport
	Goal			Stadium: Haig Avenue; Attendance: 1200

4 May 1946 36	Rochdale	2–1	Southport	Rochdale
	Rodi; Wood		Goal	Stadium: Spotland Stadium; Attendance: 3191

=== F.A. Cup ===
17 November 1945 1	Stockport County	1–2	Rochdale	Stockport
	Shaw	Report	Brindle; Woods	Stadium: Edgeley Park; Attendance: 6000

24 November 1945 1	Rochdale	1–1	Stockport County	Rochdale
	Hargreaves	Report	Hyde	Stadium: Spotland Stadium; Attendance: 6158

8 December 1945 2	Tranmere Rovers	3–1	Rochdale	Birkenhead
	Bell; Rosenthal; Atkinson	Report	Wood	Stadium: Prenton Park; Attendance: 7000

15 December 1945 2	Rochdale	3–0	Tranmere Rovers	Rochdale
	Hargreaves; Makin	Report		Stadium: Spotland Stadium; Attendance: 6500

5 January 1946 3	Bury	3–3	Rochdale	Bury
	Davies; Halton	Report	Cunliffe; Hargreaves; Reynolds	Stadium: Gigg Lane; Attendance: 13248

8 January 1946 3	Rochdale	2–4	Bury	Rochdale
	Hargreaves	Report	Davies; Tompkin; Jones; Moss	Stadium: Spotland Stadium; Attendance: 8712

=== Lancashire Senior Cup ===
5 September 1945 1	Manchester United	5–1	Rochdale	Manchester
	Goal		Constantine	Stadium: Maine Road

1 January 1946 1	Rochdale	2–0	Manchester United	Rochdale
	Brindle; Hargreaves			Stadium: Spotland Stadium
