= 1944–45 Rochdale A.F.C. season =

English football club season

Rochdale
1944–45 season
- Manager: Ted Goodier
- Stadium: Spotland Stadium
- Football League North: 27th & 57th
- Top goalscorer: League: John Reid; Ernest Morris (6); All: John Reid; Ernest Morris (6)

The 1944–45 season was Rochdale A.F.C.'s 38th in existence and their 6th in the wartime league (League North). The season was split into 2 championships. Rochdale finished in 27th position in the first and in 57th position and in the second. Some matches in the 2nd Championship were also in the League War Cup and Lancashire Cup.

== Squad Statistics ==
=== Appearances and goals ===
No.	Pos	Nat	Player	Total		Football League North & League War Cup	
No.	Pos	Nat	Player	Apps	Goals	Apps	Goals
	GK	(England) ENG	Arthur Chesters	26	0	26	0
	GK	(England) ENG	Walker Grimsditch	7	0	7	0
	GK		W. Thorpe	1	0	1	0
	GK		H.H.C. Hall	2	0	2	0
	GK		Hesketh	1	0	1	0
	GK		F. Olive	1	0	1	0
	DF		W. Manghan	1	0	1	0
	MF	(England) ENG	Joe Duff	38	3	38	3
	DF	(England) ENG	Ellis Cornwell	29	0	29	0
	DF		Matthew Muir	15	0	15	0
	DF	(England) ENG	William Keenan	1	0	1	0
	DF	(England) ENG	Bill Byrom	18	0	18	0
	DF	(England) ENG	Doug Cole	2	0	2	0
	DF	(England) ENG	Harry Lowe	5	0	5	0
	DF	(England) ENG	Eddie Lyons	5	0	5	0
	DF	(Wales) WAL	Gwyn Jones	3	0	3	0
	MF	(England) ENG	Jim Treanor	7	0	7	0
	MF		Jimmy? Macauley	1	0	1	0
	MF	(England) ENG	Walter Ainsworth	7	3	7	3
	MF	(England) ENG	Jimmy Eastwood	3	0	3	0
	MF		Jimmy Jones	15	2	15	2
	MF		Charles Wilson	1	0	1	0
	MF	(Wales) WAL	Bob Davies	1	0	1	0
	MF		F. Whittaker	7	0	7	0
	MF	(England) ENG	Tom Jones	8	0	8	0
	MF	(England) ENG	John Neary	24	0	24	0
	MF	(England) ENG	Jimmy Chambers	1	0	1	0
	MF	(England) ENG	Jimmy Gemmell	3	0	3	0
	DF	(Wales) WAL	Jim Pearce	1	0	1	0
	DF	(England) ENG	George Haigh	24	1	24	1
	MF		Jack Bradshaw	2	0	2	0
	MF	(England) ENG	Jack Foxton	1	0	1	0
	MF	(England) ENG	James Taylor	1	0	1	0
	MF		Percy Taylor	1	1	1	1
	FW	(England) ENG	John Gastall	2	0	2	0
	MF	(England) ENG	Wally Reynolds	18	3	18	3
	FW	(England) ENG	Jack Gallon	22	5	22	5
	MF		John Reid	12	6	12	6
	FW	(England) ENG	Alf Ainsworth	6	0	6	0
	MF		A.L. Hughes	1	0	1	0
	MF	(England) ENG	Sammy Makin	11	2	11	2
	MF		S.A. Pickstock	1	1	1	1
	FW	(England) ENG	Jimmy Cunliffe	3	0	3	0
	MF		John Banner	1	0	1	0
	MF	(England) ENG	Albert Mycock	2	0	2	0
	MF		Jack Higham	1	0	1	0
	FW		Ernest Morris	9	6	9	6
	FW		Albert Griffiths	1	0	1	0
	FW		Harold Acton	2	1	2	1
	FW		Alfred Chaney	1	0	1	0
	FW	(Northern Ireland) NIR	Davy Cochrane	2	1	2	1
	FW	(England) ENG	Wally Hunt	1	1	1	1
	FW	(England) ENG	Jimmy Constantine	10	3	10	3
	FW		Jack Harker	4	0	4	0
	FW		James Weatherspoon	1	0	1	0
	FW		William Whittle	1	0	1	0
	FW	(England) ENG	Jack Bradley	1	0	1	0
	FW		D. Strachan	6	0	6	0
	FW	(England) ENG	Tom Cochrane	4	1	4	1
	MF	(England) ENG	Albert Malam	2	0	2	0
	FW	(England) ENG	Arthur Bailey	1	0	1	0
	FW		J. Bate	1	0	1	0
	FW	(England) ENG	Eric Wood	5	3	5	3
	FW	(England) ENG	Syd Roberts	2	1	2	1
	FW	(England) ENG	Billy Woods	1	0	1	0
	MF	(England) ENG	Arthur Cunliffe	3	0	3	0
	FW		Kenneth Atkinson	2	0	2	0
	FW	(England) ENG	James Harrison	4	0	4	0
	FW		James Young	2	1	2	1
	FW		Harry Revell	1	0	1	0
	FW	(England) ENG	Jack Brinton	2	1	2	1
	FW		Harry Seddon	1	0	1	0
	FW	(England) ENG	Alf Hanson	4	4	4	4
	FW		Thorpe	1	0	1	0

== Competitions ==
=== Football League North & War League Cup ===
26 August 1944 1	Rochdale	3–7	Blackpool	Rochdale
	W. Ainsworth; Morris		Mortensen	Stadium: Spotland Stadium; Attendance: 7071

2 September 1944 2	Blackpool	3–0	Rochdale	Blackpool
	Goal			Stadium: Bloomfield Road; Attendance: 4000

9 September 1944 3	Blackburn Rovers	3–0	Rochdale	Blackburn
	Goal			Stadium: Ewood Park; Attendance: 3000

16 September 1944 4	Rochdale	2–0	Blackburn Rovers	Rochdale
	W. Ainsworth; Acton			Stadium: Spotland Stadium; Attendance: 2850

23 September 1944 5	Burnley	2–2	Rochdale	Burnley
	Goal		Duff; W. Ainsworth	Stadium: Turf Moor; Attendance: 4213

30 September 1944 6	Rochdale	3–1	Burnley	Rochdale
	Gallon; D. Cochrane; Duff		Goal	Stadium: Spotland Stadium; Attendance: 3612

7 October 1944 7	Rochdale	2–2	Bolton Wanderers	Rochdale
	Gallon; P. Taylor		Goal	Stadium: Spotland Stadium; Attendance: 4100

14 October 1944 8	Bolton Wanderers	0–0	Rochdale	Bolton
				Stadium: Burnden Park; Attendance: 4000

21 October 1944 9	Accrington Stanley	1–2	Rochdale	Accrington
	Goal		Morris	Stadium: Peel Park; Attendance: 3449

28 October 1944 10	Rochdale	3–0	Accrington Stanley	Rochdale
	Morris; Roach (o.g.)			Stadium: Spotland Stadium; Attendance: 2135

4 November 1944 11	Rochdale	5–2	Preston North End	Rochdale
	Gallon; Reynolds; T. Cochrane; Wood		Goal	Stadium: Spotland Stadium; Attendance: 3100

11 November 1944 12	Preston North End	2–1	Rochdale	Preston
	Goal		J. Jones	Stadium: Deepdale; Attendance: 2700

18 November 1944 13	Southport	2–2	Rochdale	Southport
	Goal		Hunt; J. Jones	Stadium: Haig Avenue; Attendance: 3000

25 November 1944 14	Rochdale	1–1	Southport	Rochdale
	Roberts		Goal	Stadium: Spotland Stadium; Attendance: 3326

2 December 1944 15	Rochdale	2–3	Oldham Athletic	Rochdale
	Reid		Goal	Stadium: Spotland Stadium; Attendance: 2621

9 December 1944 16	Oldham Athletic	0–2	Rochdale	Oldham
			Reid; Reynolds	Stadium: Boundary Park; Attendance: 5658

16 December 1944 17	Halifax Town	4–2	Rochdale	Halifax
	Goal		Pickstock; Makin	Stadium: The Shay; Attendance: 1800

23 December 1944 18	Rochdale	3–0	Halifax Town	Rochdale
	Reynolds; Reid; Young			Stadium: Spotland Stadium; Attendance: 4760

25 December 1944 19	Accrington Stanley	0–1	Rochdale	Accrington
			Gallon	Stadium: Peel Park; Attendance: 5800

30 December 1944 20	Rochdale	1–1	Accrington Stanley	Rochdale
	Haigh		Goal	Stadium: Spotland Stadium; Attendance: 4063

13 January 1945 21	Blackburn Rovers	3–2	Rochdale	Blackburn
	Goal		Gallon; Constantine	Stadium: Ewood Park; Attendance: 3017

20 January 1945 22	Rochdale	1–1	Preston North End	Rochdale
	Reid		Goal	Stadium: Spotland Stadium; Attendance: 1934

27 January 1945 23	Preston North End	1–1	Rochdale	Preston
	Goal		Reid	Stadium: Deepdale; Attendance: 1755

3 February 1945 24	Burnley	2–0	Rochdale	Burnley
	Goal			Stadium: Turf Moor; Attendance: 5657

10 February 1945 25	Rochdale	0–4	Burnley	Rochdale
			Goal	Stadium: Spotland Stadium; Attendance: 4607

17 February 1945 26	Rochdale	3–6	Blackpool	Rochdale
	? (o.g.); Hanson		Goal	Stadium: Spotland Stadium; Attendance: 2554

24 February 1945 27	Blackpool	4–0	Rochdale	Blackpool
	Goal			Stadium: Bloomfield Road; Attendance: 7000

3 March 1945 28	Rochdale	0–8	Blackburn Rovers	Rochdale
			Goal	Stadium: Spotland Stadium; Attendance: 2887

10 March 1945 29	Rochdale	0–1	Blackburn Rovers	Rochdale
			Goal	Stadium: Spotland Stadium; Attendance: 2670

17 March 1945 30	Blackburn Rovers	4–0	Rochdale	Blackburn
	Goal			Stadium: Ewood Park; Attendance: 3000

24 March 1945 31	Tranmere Rovers	0–1	Rochdale	Birkenhead
			Brinton	Stadium: Prenton Park; Attendance: 2376

31 March 1945 32	Rochdale	4–1	Tranmere Rovers	Rochdale
	Duff; Constantine; Makin		Goal	Stadium: Spotland Stadium; Attendance: 2379

2 April 1945 33	Chester	3–0	Rochdale	Chester
	Goal			Stadium: Sealand Road; Attendance: 3000

7 April 1945 34	Stockport County	3–0	Rochdale	Stockport
	Goal			Stadium: Edgeley Park; Attendance: 3042

14 April 1945 35	Rochdale	0–2	Stockport County	Rochdale
			Goal	Stadium: Spotland Stadium; Attendance: 1671

21 April 1945 36	Rochdale	1–2	Oldham Athletic	Rochdale
	Wood		Goal	Stadium: Spotland Stadium; Attendance: 1776

28 April 1945 37	Oldham Athletic	2–0	Rochdale	Oldham
	Goal			Stadium: Boundary Park; Attendance: 1297

5 May 1945 38	Rochdale	2–1	Chester	Rochdale
	Hanson		Goal	Stadium: Spotland Stadium; Attendance: 708
