= 1940–41 Rochdale A.F.C. season =

English football club season

Rochdale
1940–41 season
- Manager: Ted Goodier
- Stadium: Spotland Stadium
- North Regional League: 30th
- League War Cup: 1st Round
- Top goalscorer: League: Wally Sidebottom (11); All: Wally Sidebottom (11)

The 1940–41 season was Rochdale A.F.C.'s 34th in existence and their second in the wartime league. Due to the unequal number of games played by the various teams, the North Regional League was decided on goal average only. Rochdale finished 30th out of 36 clubs.

== Squad Statistics ==
=== Appearances and goals ===
No.	Pos	Nat	Player	Total		North Regional League		League War Cup	
No.	Pos	Nat	Player	Apps	Goals	Apps	Goals	Apps	Goals
	GK	(England) ENG	William Carey	5	0	5	0	0	0
	MF	(England) ENG	Eric Eastwood	3	0	3	0	0	0
	FW	(England) ENG	Joe Duff	26	7	24	7	2	0
	FW	(England) ENG	Arthur Warburton	7	0	7	0	0	0
	DF	(England) ENG	John Neary	4	0	3	0	1	0
	DF	(England) ENG	John Connor	17	0	17	0	0	0
	MF	(England) ENG	Sid Rawlings	19	4	19	4	0	0
	FW	(England) ENG	Jimmy Cunliffe	11	6	11	6	0	0
	FW	(England) ENG	George Hunt	5	0	5	0	0	0
	FW	(England) ENG	Billy Graham	2	0	2	0	0	0
	MF	(England) ENG	Wally Sidebottom	17	11	17	11	0	0
	DF	(England) ENG	Bill Byrom	2	0	2	0	0	0
	MF	(England) ENG	Jimmy Eastwood	31	0	29	0	2	0
	MF	(England) ENG	Joe Taylor	2	0	2	0	0	0
	MF	(England) ENG	Peter Vause	6	1	6	1	0	0
	FW	(England) ENG	Tommy Dutton	21	3	21	3	0	0
	DF	(England) ENG	Tom Smith	19	0	17	0	2	0
	FW	(England) ENG	Wally Hunt	18	10	16	10	2	0
	GK	(England) ENG	Jack Hall	28	0	26	0	2	0
	DF	(Scotland) SCO	Tom Sneddon	6	0	4	0	2	0
	FW	(England) ENG	Willie Harker	3	0	3	0	0	0
	DF	(England) ENG	Reg Mountford	4	0	4	0	0	0
	FW	(England) ENG	Harry Sutherland	1	0	1	0	0	0
	MF		Vincent Kershaw	5	1	5	1	0	0
	DF	(England) ENG	Tom Jones	18	1	17	1	1	0
	FW	(England) ENG	Alf Bellis	8	2	6	1	2	1
	MF	(England) ENG	Eric Keen	18	0	16	0	2	0
	FW	(England) ENG	Micky Fenton	1	0	1	0	0	0
	FW	(England) ENG	Dennis Isherwood	1	0	1	0	0	0
	GK	(England) ENG	Jack Robinson	1	0	1	0	0	0
	MF		B. Rothwell	1	0	1	0	0	0
	MF		Percy Taylor	13	3	11	2	2	1
	MF	(England) ENG	James Harrison	1	1	1	1	0	0
	FW		Harry Seddon	7	1	7	1	0	0
	MF	(England) ENG	Jack Johnson	1	0	1	0	0	0
	FW	(England) ENG	Alf Ainsworth	3	1	3	1	0	0
	MF		J. Wood	3	1	3	1	0	0
	DF	(England) ENG	Maurice Reeday	1	0	1	0	0	0
	MF	(England) ENG	Les Turner	4	0	4	0	0	0
	FW		Walter Horrabin	9	8	9	8	0	0
	FW		A. Hughes	1	0	1	0	0	0
	GK		Kenneth Heys	1	0	1	0	0	0
	DF	(England) ENG	Norman Kirkman	5	0	5	0	0	0
	MF	(England) ENG	Les Horton	6	0	6	0	0	0
	MF	(Scotland) SCO	Frank Walkden	1	0	1	0	0	0
	DF	(England) ENG	George Farrow	1	0	1	0	0	0
	MF	(England) ENG	Richard Haworth	2	1	2	1	0	0
	MF		Clarke	1	0	1	0	0	0
	DF	(England) ENG	John Chew	1	0	1	0	0	0
	FW	(Scotland) SCO	Duncan Colquhoun	1	0	1	0	0	0
	FW	(England) ENG	Jimmy Wynn	2	1	0	0	2	1

== Competitions ==
=== North Regional League ===
31 August 1940 1	Rochdale	1–3	Manchester United	Rochdale
	Cunliffe		Aston; J. Carey; Smith	Stadium: Spotland Stadium; Attendance: 2827

7 September 1940 2	Rochdale	1–2	Burnley	Rochdale
	Sidebottom		Goal	Stadium: Spotland Stadium; Attendance: 2100

14 September 1940 3	Crewe Alexandra	1–1	Rochdale	Crewe
	Goal		Duff	Stadium: Gresty Road; Attendance: 1000

21 September 1940 4	Stockport County	4–0	Rochdale	Stockport
	Goal			Stadium: Edgeley Park; Attendance: 2500

28 September 1940 5	Bury	7–3	Rochdale	Bury
	Goal		Vause; Cunliffe; Dutton	Stadium: Gigg Lane; Attendance: 2365

5 October 1940 6	Rochdale	2–1	Preston North End	Rochdale
	Dutton; Sidebottom		Goal	Stadium: Spotland Stadium; Attendance: 1999

12 October 1940 7	Rochdale	1–1	Blackburn Rovers	Rochdale
	Dutton		Goal	Stadium: Spotland Stadium; Attendance: 2246

19 October 1940 8	Blackburn Rovers	2–0	Rochdale	Blackburn
	Goal			Stadium: Ewood Park; Attendance: 1200

26 October 1940 9	Southport	2–3	Rochdale	Southport
	Goal		Cunliffe; Kershaw	Stadium: Haig Avenue; Attendance: 1500

2 November 1940 10	Rochdale	1–1	Bradford Park Avenue	Rochdale
	Sidebottom		Goal	Stadium: Spotland Stadium; Attendance: 803

9 November 1940 11	Preston North End	5–0	Rochdale	Preston
	Goal			Stadium: Deepdale; Attendance: 300

16 November 1940 12	Rochdale	5–3	Stockport County	Rochdale
	Sidebottom; Rawlings; S.W. Hunt; Cunliffe		Catterick	Stadium: Spotland Stadium; Attendance: 2130

23 November 1940 13	Burnley	0–1	Rochdale	Burnley
			S.W. Hunt	Stadium: Turf Moor; Attendance: 1500

30 November 1940 14	Rochdale	10 – 0	Southport	Rochdale
	Sidebottom; Rawlings; S.W. Hunt; Bellis			Stadium: Spotland Stadium; Attendance: 1002

7 December 1940 15	Bradford Park Avenue	2–4	Rochdale	Bradford
	Goal		Rawlings; Duff; S.W. Hunt; Stephen (o.g.)	Stadium: Park Avenue; Attendance: 850

14 December 1940 16	Manchester United	3–4	Rochdale	Manchester
	Smith; J. Carey		Sidebottom; S.W. Hunt; Cunliffe	Stadium: Old Trafford; Attendance: 1000

21 December 1940 17	Rochdale	1–0	Crewe Alexandra	Rochdale
	Duff			Stadium: Spotland Stadium; Attendance: 1300

25 December 1940 18	Rochdale	2–3	Oldham Athletic	Rochdale
	S.W. Hunt; Rawlings		Goal	Stadium: Spotland Stadium; Attendance: 2806

28 December 1940 19	Rochdale	0–3	Bury	Rochdale
			Goal	Stadium: Spotland Stadium; Attendance: 1700

4 January 1941 20	Manchester City	9–1	Rochdale	Manchester
	Jimmy Currie		S.W. Hunt	Stadium: Maine Road; Attendance: 2000

11 January 1941 21	Rochdale	1–6	Manchester City	Rochdale
	Wood		Jimmy Currie	Stadium: Spotland Stadium; Attendance: 1588

15 January 1941 22	Rochdale	5–0	Crewe Alexandra	Rochdale
	Duff; S.W. Hunt; Ainsworth; Seddon			Stadium: Spotland Stadium; Attendance: 523

8 March 1941 23	Crewe Alexandra	2–5	Rochdale	Crewe
	Goal		Horrabin; J. Eastwood	Stadium: Gresty Road; Attendance: 500

15 March 1941 24	Rochdale	2–1	Bradford City	Rochdale
	P. Taylor; Horrabin		Goal	Stadium: Spotland Stadium; Attendance: 1380

22 March 1941 25	Huddersfield Town	11 – 0	Rochdale	Huddersfield
	Metcalfe; Price; Lodge; McKerrell; Barclay			Stadium: Leeds Road; Attendance: 386

29 March 1941 26	Rochdale	2–3	Leeds United	Rochdale
	Horrabin; Duff		Goal	Stadium: Spotland Stadium; Attendance: 784

5 April 1941 27	Stockport County	1–1	Rochdale	Stockport
	Goal		Horrabin	Stadium: Edgeley Park; Attendance: 820

12 April 1941 28	Rochdale	3–1	Stockport County	Rochdale
	P. Taylor; Jones; Horrabin		Goal	Stadium: Spotland Stadium; Attendance: 1438

14 April 1941 29	Rochdale	0–4	Oldham Athletic	Rochdale
			Goal	Stadium: Spotland Stadium; Attendance: 1733

19 April 1941 30	Rochdale	1–3	Bolton Wanderers	Rochdale
	P. Taylor		Goal	Stadium: Spotland Stadium; Attendance: 726

26 April 1941 31	Bradford City	3–3	Rochdale	Bradford
	Richard Haworth; Duff; Harrison		Goal	Stadium: Valley Parade; Attendance: 500

10 May 1941 32	Oldham Athletic	5–0	Rochdale	Oldham
	Goal			Stadium: Boundary Park; Attendance: 1189

=== League War Cup ===
15 February 1941 33	Newcastle United	1–2	Rochdale	Newcastle upon Tyne
	Goal		P. Taylor; Bellis	Stadium: St James' Park; Attendance: 3000

22 February 1941 34	Rochdale	1–3	Newcastle United	Rochdale
	Wynn		Stubbins	Stadium: Spotland Stadium; Attendance: 3000
