= 1943–44 Rochdale A.F.C. season =

English football club season

Rochdale
1943–44 season
- Manager: Ted Goodier
- Stadium: Spotland Stadium
- Football League North: 13th & 24th
- League War Cup: 2nd round
- Top goalscorer: League: Jack Harker (26); All: Jack Harker (26)

The 1943–44 season was Rochdale A.F.C.'s 37th in existence and their 5th in the wartime league (League North). The season was split into 2 championships. In the 1st Championship, Rochdale finished in 13th position out of 50, and in the 2nd Championship, they finished 24th out of 50. Some matches in the 2nd Championship were also in the League War Cup and Lancashire Cup.

== Squad Statistics ==
=== Appearances and goals ===
No.	Pos	Nat	Player	Total		Football League North & League War Cup	
No.	Pos	Nat	Player	Apps	Goals	Apps	Goals
	GK	(England) ENG	Bill Fielding	12	0	12	0
	GK	(England) ENG	Arthur Chesters	26	0	26	0
	DF	(England) ENG	Lew Bradford	38	0	38	0
	DF	(England) ENG	Bill Byrom	36	0	36	0
	MF	(England) ENG	Tom Wildsmith	14	0	14	0
	MF	(England) ENG	Tom Dooley	3	0	3	0
	MF	(England) ENG	Jimmy Eastwood	2	0	2	0
	MF		Edward Mulligan	3	1	3	1
	MF	(England) ENG	Tom Breakwell	3	0	3	0
	MF	(England) ENG	Joe Duff	35	5	35	5
	MF	(England) ENG	Jim Treanor	5	0	5	0
	DF	(England) ENG	Leslie Lievesley	1	0	1	0
	MF	(England) ENG	Ellis Cornwell	3	0	3	0
	FW	(England) ENG	Arthur Warburton	1	0	1	0
	MF	(England) ENG	Tom Jones	21	0	21	0
	MF	(England) ENG	John Neary	3	0	3	0
	DF	(England) ENG	George Haigh	33	2	33	2
	MF	(Wales) WAL	Bob Davies	1	0	1	0
	MF		Jimmy? Macauley	1	0	1	0
	FW	(Wales) WAL	George Murphy	1	0	1	0
	MF		John McGahie?	1	0	1	0
	MF		Percy Taylor	9	2	9	2
	MF		Harry Gee	25	11	25	11
	MF		S. Connor	1	0	1	0
	FW	(England) ENG	Jimmy Cunliffe	21	9	21	9
	DF	(England) ENG	Les Horton	2	0	2	0
	MF	(England) ENG	Charles Windle	1	0	1	0
	MF		Michael O'Mahoney	3	0	3	0
	MF		John Banner	1	0	1	0
	FW	(England) ENG	Eric Wood	37	15	37	15
	FW	(England) ENG	Jack Gallon	1	0	1	0
	FW		Jack Harker	22	26	22	26
	FW		Roy Carrick	1	0	1	0
	FW		Ernest Morris	11	4	11	4
	MF	(England) ENG	James Harrison	17	5	17	5
	FW		Arthur Joseph	1	0	1	0
	FW		Willie Miller	7	0	7	0
	MF	(England) ENG	Jackie Wharton	3	1	3	1
	FW		Bill Rudd (snr)	2	0	2	0
	FW	(England) ENG	Richard Maudsley	4	0	4	0
	FW	(Wales) WAL	Doug Redwood	2	1	2	1
	FW	(Wales) WAL	Tom Sibley	3	3	3	3
	FW		Jimmy Jones	1	0	1	0

== Competitions ==
=== Football League North & War League Cup ===
28 August 1943 1	Blackpool	6–1	Rochdale	Blackpool
	Goal		Harker	Stadium: Bloomfield Road; Attendance: 8000

4 September 1943 2	Rochdale	2–6	Blackpool	Rochdale
	Cunliffe; Harker		Goal	Stadium: Spotland Stadium; Attendance: 4330

11 September 1943 3	Rochdale	6–1	Southport	Rochdale
	Harker; Wood		Goal	Stadium: Spotland Stadium; Attendance: 2032

18 September 1943 4	Southport	4–4	Rochdale	Southport
	Goal		Harker	Stadium: Haig Avenue; Attendance: 2700

25 September 1943 5	Oldham Athletic	2–0	Rochdale	Oldham
	Goal			Stadium: Boundary Park; Attendance: 2570

2 October 1943 6	Rochdale	2–1	Oldham Athletic	Rochdale
	Harker; Wood		Goal	Stadium: Spotland Stadium; Attendance: 2023

9 October 1943 7	Halifax Town	2–2	Rochdale	Halifax
	Goal		Harker; Duff	Stadium: The Shay; Attendance: 3160

16 October 1943 8	Rochdale	4–3	Halifax Town	Rochdale
	Mulligan; Gee; Cunliffe		Goal	Stadium: Spotland Stadium; Attendance: 2343

23 October 1943 9	Blackburn Rovers	6–1	Rochdale	Blackburn
	Goal		Cunliffe	Stadium: Ewood Park; Attendance: 3822

30 October 1943 10	Rochdale	2–1	Blackburn Rovers	Rochdale
	Wood; Cunliffe		Goal	Stadium: Spotland Stadium; Attendance: 3161

6 November 1943 11	Rochdale	3–1	Burnley	Rochdale
	Wood; Harker; Gee		Goal	Stadium: Spotland Stadium; Attendance: 3214

13 November 1943 12	Burnley	2–0	Rochdale	Burnley
	Goal			Stadium: Turf Moor; Attendance: 2200

20 November 1943 13	Stockport County	1–3	Rochdale	Stockport
	Goal		Cunliffe; Redwood	Stadium: Edgeley Park; Attendance: 1800

27 November 1943 14	Rochdale	2–0	Stockport County	Rochdale
	Harker			Stadium: Spotland Stadium; Attendance: 1122
Note: Match abandoned after 74 minutes because of fog, but the result stood.

4 December 1943 15	Rochdale	2–1	Bradford City	Rochdale
	Harker		Goal	Stadium: Spotland Stadium; Attendance: 2290

11 December 1943 16	Bradford City	3–0	Rochdale	Bradford
	Goal			Stadium: Valley Parade; Attendance: 2500

18 December 1943 17	Bury	1–4	Rochdale	Bury
	Goal		Harrison; Harker; Gee; Wood	Stadium: Gigg Lane; Attendance: 2134

25 December 1943 18	Rochdale	5–0	Bury	Rochdale
	Gee; Cunliffe; Wood; Harrison; Harker			Stadium: Spotland Stadium; Attendance: 3103

27 December 1943 19	Rochdale	5–0	Bolton Wanderers	Rochdale
	Harker; Cunliffe			Stadium: Spotland Stadium

1 January 1944 20	Bolton Wanderers	2–2	Rochdale	Bolton
	Goal		Gee; Harrison	Stadium: Burnden Park; Attendance: 6786

8 January 1944 21	Blackburn Rovers	3–1	Rochdale	Blackburn
	Goal		Wood	Stadium: Ewood Park; Attendance: 4530

15 January 1944 22	Rochdale	4–0	Blackburn Rovers	Rochdale
	Wood; Gee; Harrison			Stadium: Spotland Stadium; Attendance: 4055

22 January 1944 23	Burnley	2–2	Rochdale	Burnley
	Goal		Gee	Stadium: Turf Moor; Attendance: 1825

29 January 1944 24	Rochdale	3–1	Burnley	Rochdale
	Morris; Taylor		Goal	Stadium: Spotland Stadium; Attendance: 5000

5 February 1944 25	Rochdale	0–0	Southport	Rochdale
				Stadium: Spotland Stadium; Attendance: 4330

12 February 1944 26	Southport	2–4	Rochdale	Southport
	Goal		Gee; Harrison; Harker	Stadium: Haig Avenue; Attendance: 3500

19 February 1944 27	Blackpool	2–0	Rochdale	Blackpool
	Goal			Stadium: Bloomfield Road; Attendance: 8000

26 February 1944 28	Rochdale	0–2	Blackpool	Rochdale
			Goal	Stadium: Spotland Stadium; Attendance: 9911

4 March 1944 29	Burnley	3–3	Rochdale	Burnley
	Gee; Wood; Sibley		Goal	Stadium: Turf Moor; Attendance: 6166

11 March 1944 30	Rochdale	2–1 (a.e.t.)	Burnley	Rochdale
	Duff; Sibley		Goal	Stadium: Spotland Stadium; Attendance: 7023
Note: Result counted as a draw in the league and a win in the League Cup.

18 March 1944 31	Blackpool	8–0	Rochdale	Blackpool
	Dix; Mortensen			Stadium: Bloomfield Road; Attendance: 25000

25 March 1944 32	Rochdale	2–1	Blackpool	Rochdale
	Duff		Goal	Stadium: Spotland Stadium; Attendance: 8706

1 April 1944 33	Rochdale	4–0	Oldham Athletic	Rochdale
	Wood; Duff; Haigh			Stadium: Spotland Stadium; Attendance: 4188

8 April 1944 34	Oldham Athletic	0–2	Rochdale	Oldham
			Wood; Wharton	Stadium: Boundary Park; Attendance: 7620

10 April 1944 35	Rochdale	1–4	Stockport County	Rochdale
	Wood		Goal	Stadium: Spotland Stadium; Attendance: 5700

15 April 1944 36	Stockport County	3–2	Rochdale	Stockport
	Goal		Sibley; Wood	Stadium: Edgeley Park; Attendance: 3000

22 April 1944 37	Tranmere Rovers	1–0	Rochdale	Birkenhead
	Goal			Stadium: Prenton Park; Attendance: 1500

29 April 1944 38	Rochdale	4–1	Tranmere Rovers	Rochdale
	Morris; Wood; Taylor		Goal	Stadium: Spotland Stadium; Attendance: 1693
