= 1942–43 Liverpool F.C. season =

English football club season

Liverpool F.C.
1942–43 season
- Manager: George Kay
- Stadium: Anfield
- North Regional League: 2nd & 1st
- League War Cup: 2nd Round
- Top goalscorer: League: Cyril Done; All: Cyril Done
Home colours	Away colours

The 1942–43 season saw Liverpool compete in the wartime North Regional League. Some matches were also part of the League War Cup and the Lancashire Senior Cup.

== Statistics ==
=== Appearances and goals ===
No.	Pos	Nat	Player	Total		Regional League North		Lancashire Cup Final	
No.	Pos	Nat	Player	Apps	Goals	Apps	Goals	Apps	Goals
	DF	(England) ENG	Jack Balmer	16	14	14	11	2	3
	DF	(England) ENG	Tom Bush	5	0	5	0	0	0
	DF	(England) ENG	Jackie Campbell	4	1	4	1	0	0
	FW	(England) ENG	Len Carney	3	1	3	1	0	0
	DF	(England) ENG	Stan Charlesworth	9	0	9	0	0	0
	FW	(England) ENG	Cyril Done	39	37	37	37	2	0
	FW	(England) ENG	Dicky Dorsett	14	14	14	14	0	0
	FW	(England) ENG	Harry Eastham	1	0	1	0	0	0
	FW	(England) ENG	Maurice Edelston	3	1	3	1	0	0
	FW	(Scotland) SCO	Willie Fagan	28	20	26	20	2	0
	DF	(England) ENG	Fred Finney	1	0	1	0	0	0
	DF	(England) ENG	Ron Guttridge	20	0	20	0	0	0
	MF	(England) ENG	Billy Hall	4	2	4	2	0	0
	DF	(Scotland) SCO	Jim Harley	2	1	2	1	0	0
	FW	(England) ENG	Freddie Haycock	9	1	9	1	0	0
	GK	(England) ENG	Alf Hobson	40	0	38	0	2	0
	DF	(England) ENG	Laurie Hughes	2	0	2	0	0	0
	MF	(England) ENG	Mick Hulligan	31	16	29	16	2	0
	DF	(England) ENG	George Jackson	6	0	6	0	0	0
	MF	(England) ENG	Bill Jones	5	0	5	0	0	0
	DF	(England) ENG	Harry Kaye	38	2	36	2	2	0
	DF	(England) ENG	Eric Keen	17	0	17	0	0	0
			N.R. Kirby	1	0	1	0	0	0
	DF	(Wales) WAL	Ray Lambert	10	0	9	0	1	0
	MF	(Scotland) SCO	Billy Liddell	15	5	15	5	0	0
			George Livingstone	1	0	1	0	0	0
	DF	(Scotland) SCO	Norman Low	1	0	1	0	0	0
	DF	(England) ENG	Harry Mather	2	0	1	0	1	0
	DF	(Scotland) SCO	Jimmy McInnes	3	0	3	0	0	0
	FW	(England) ENG	George Mills	9	9	9	9	0	0
	FW	(Wales) WAL	George Murphy	1	0	0	0	1	0
	MF	(South Africa) RSA	Berry Nieuwenhuys	7	3	6	2	1	1
	FW	(England) ENG	Stan Palk	2	1	2	1	0	0
	DF	(Scotland) SCO	George Paterson	2	2	2	2	0	0
	MF	(Scotland) SCO	Tommy Pearson	1	1	1	1	0	0
	MF	(England) ENG	Jack Pilling	36	1	34	1	2	0
		(England) ENG	Alfie Pope	1	0	1	0	0	0
	MF	(England) ENG	Sid Rawlings	1	0	1	0	0	0
	DF	(England) ENG	Frank Rist	8	0	6	0	2	0
			Ken Seddon	6	0	6	0	0	0
	FW	(England) ENG	John Shafto	1	1	1	1	0	0
	MF	(England) ENG	Arthur Shepherd	1	1	1	1	0	0
	DF	(England) ENG	Eddie Spicer	2	0	2	0	0	0
	FW	(England) ENG	Phil Taylor	5	0	5	0	0	0
	FW	(England) ENG	Don Welsh	1	2	1	2	0	0
	DF	(England) ENG	Jack Westby	19	0	17	0	2	0
	DF	(England) ENG	Fred Williams	4	0	4	0	0	0
	MF		Robert Williams	1	0	1	0	0	0
	DF		Jack Wood	1	0	1	0	0	0
	DF	(England) ENG	Arthur Woodruff	1	0	1	0	0	0

== Competitions ==
=== North Region War League, War League Cup and Lancashire Senior Cup ===
29 August 1942 1	Wrexham	3–4	Liverpool	Wrexham
	Graham 1'; Frost ?	Report	Nieuwenhuys 10 ' Liddell; Mills; Palk (pen.)	Stadium: Racecourse Ground; Attendance: 2,500

5 September 1942 2	Liverpool	4–0	Wrexham	Liverpool
	Done; Dorsett	Report		Stadium: Anfield; Attendance: 5,000; Referee: J. Phillips

12 September 1942 3	Liverpool	1–0	Everton	Liverpool
	Mills 25'	Report		Stadium: Anfield; Attendance: 17,131

19 September 1942 4	Everton	4–4	Liverpool	Liverpool
	Goal	Report	Done 21 ' Dorsett 50', 88 ' Liddell 85 '	Stadium: Goodison Park; Attendance: 17,000; Referee: H. Holt

26 September 1942 5	Bury	1–4	Liverpool	Bury
	Goal	Report	Mills; Done; Liddell	Stadium: Gigg Lane; Attendance: 2,310

3 October 1942 6	Liverpool	5–2	Bury	Liverpool
	Done; Hulligan; Mills; Gemmell (o.g.)	Report	Goal	Stadium: Anfield; Attendance: 8,362

10 October 1942 7	Manchester United	3–4	Liverpool	Manchester
	Smith; Mitten	Report	Done 15', 54 ' Harley 80 ' Hulligan 89 '	Stadium: Maine Road; Attendance: 4,000

17 October 1942 8	Liverpool	2–1	Manchester United	Liverpool
	Fagan 21'; Done	Report	Carey	Stadium: Anfield; Attendance: 12,788; Referee: H. Holt

24 October 1942 9	Manchester City	1–4	Liverpool	Manchester
	Currier	Report	Done 28', 81 ' Mills 52 ' Balmer 78 '	Stadium: Maine Road; Attendance: 4,000; Referee: H. Holt

31 October 1942 10	Liverpool	3–1	Manchester City	Liverpool
	Done 37', 88'; Fagan 65'	Report	Stuart	Stadium: Anfield; Attendance: 12,401

7 November 1942 11	Liverpool	4–2	Chester	Liverpool
	Fagan; Liddell; Balmer; Done	Report	Goal	Stadium: Anfield; Attendance: 11,047

14 November 1942 12	Chester	1–5	Liverpool	Chester
	Goal	Report	Balmer; Carney; Fagan	Stadium: Sealand Road; Attendance: 5,000

21 November 1942 13	Southport	3–2	Liverpool	Southport
	Goal	Report	Done 44 ' Shafto	Stadium: Haig Avenue; Attendance: 10,000

28 November 1942 14	Liverpool	6–2	Southport	Liverpool
	Fagan (pen.); Mills; Dorsett; Fagan	Report	Goal	Stadium: Anfield; Attendance: 22,273

5 December 1942 15	Burnley	3–1	Liverpool	Burnley
	Goal	Report	Dorsett 89 '	Stadium: Turf Moor; Attendance: 3,006

12 December 1942 16	Liverpool	9–2	Burnley	Liverpool
	Dorsett 11', 75'; Hulligan 21'; Fagan 23', 39'; Haycock 44'; Done 48', 64', 65'	Report	Bright; Jackson	Stadium: Anfield; Attendance: 10,000; Referee: H. Mortimer

19 December 1942 17	Liverpool	6–2	Tranmere Rovers	Liverpool
	Dorsett 7', 44', 46', 88' (pen.), 89'; Done 33'	Report	Goal	Stadium: Anfield; Attendance: 4,023

25 December 1942 18	Tranmere Rovers	3–2	Liverpool	Birkenhead
	Glidden 25' (pen.); Frost 55', 89'	Report	Fagan; Hall	Stadium: Prenton Park; Attendance: 7,207

26 December 1942 19	Liverpool	2–2	Wrexham	Liverpool
	Fagan (pen.); Hulligan	Report	McNee; Moore	Stadium: Anfield; Attendance: 12,000; Referee: J.E. Thomason
Note: Also counted as a qualifying Round for the League War Cup Competition.

2 January 1943 20	Wrexham	0–1	Liverpool	Wrexham
		Report	Dorsett 37 '	Stadium: Racecourse Ground; Attendance: 2,000; Referee: A. Baker
Note: Also counted as a qualifying Round for the League War Cup Competition.

9 January 1943 21	Everton	1–3	Liverpool	Liverpool
	Goal	Report	Hulligan; Shepherd	Stadium: Goodison Park; Attendance: 18,206
Note: Also counted as a Qualifying Round for the League War Cup Competition.

16 January 1943 22	Liverpool	2–1	Everton	Liverpool
	Balmer 23'; Done 89'	Report	Goal	Stadium: Anfield; Attendance: 20,400
Note: Also counted as a Qualifying Round for the League War Cup Competition.

23 January 1943 23	Liverpool	3–1	Southport	Liverpool
	Dorsett 72'; Hulligan 80', 87'	Report	Goal	Stadium: Anfield; Attendance: 14,325
Note: Also counted as a Qualifying Round for the League War Cup Competition.

30 January 1943 24	Southport	2–2	Liverpool	Southport
	Goal	Report	Fagan 17 ' Paterson 84 '	Stadium: Haig Avenue; Attendance: 5,000
Note: Also counted as a Qualifying Round for the League War Cup Competition.

6 February 1943 25	Tranmere Rovers	1–5	Liverpool	Birkenhead
	Goal	Report	Done; Fagan (pen.)	Stadium: Prenton Park; Attendance: 6,958

13 February 1943 26	Liverpool	4–1	Tranmere Rovers	Liverpool
	Hulligan 1'; Done 20', 30', 87'	Report	Goal	Stadium: Anfield; Attendance: 11,365
Note: Also counted as a Qualifying Round for the League War Cup Competition.

20 February 1943 27	Liverpool	4–2	Manchester City	Liverpool
	Hulligan 20', 90'; Done 24'; Edelston 67'	Report	King; Stuart	Stadium: Anfield; Attendance: 21,300; Referee: G. Salmon
Note: Also counted as a Qualifying Round for the League War Cup Competition.

27 February 1943 28	Manchester City	3–1	Liverpool	Manchester
	Herd ? (o.g.)	Report	Hall	Stadium: Maine Road; Attendance: 14,795
Note: Also counted as a Qualifying Round for the League War Cup Competition.

6 March 1943 29	Liverpool	1–3	Bury	Liverpool
	Hulligan 40'	Report	Goal	Stadium: Anfield; Attendance: 17,099; Referee: G. Boardman
Note: Also counted as a Round One 1st Leg for the League War Cup Competition.

13 March 1943 30	Bury	2–7	Liverpool	Bury
	Goal	Report	Pilling 11 ' Hulligan 27', 66 ' Done 34', 65', 70 ' Griffiths 35' (o.g.)	Stadium: Gigg Lane; Attendance: 10,904
Note: Also counted as a Round One 2nd Leg for the League War Cup Competition.

20 March 1943 31	Liverpool	3–1	Blackpool	Liverpool
	Balmer 8', 40'; Kaye	Report	Goal	Stadium: Anfield; Attendance: 40,000; Referee: Cpl. J.M. Wiltshire
Note: Also counted as a Round Two 1st Leg for the League War Cup Competition.

27 March 1943 32	Blackpool	5–0	Liverpool	Blackpool
	Goal	Report		Stadium: Bloomfield Road; Attendance: 25,000
Note: Also counted as Round Two 2nd Leg for the League War Cup Competition.

3 April 1943 33	Liverpool	4–1	Chester	Liverpool
	Balmer 22'; Fagan 67'; Liddell 71'; Done 88'	Report	Goal	Stadium: Anfield; Attendance: 8,000; Referee: G.H. Fell
Note: Also counted as Round One 1st Leg for the Lancashire Senior Cup.

10 April 1943 34	Chester	2–5	Liverpool	Chester
	Goal	Report	Balmer 62 ' Fagan	Stadium: Sealand Road; Attendance: 4,000
Note: Also counted as Round One 2nd Leg for the Lancashire Senior Cup.

17 April 1943 35	Liverpool	3–0	Southport	Liverpool
	Done 5'; Hulligan; Paterson	Report		Stadium: Anfield; Attendance: 10,000
Note: Also counted as Round Two 1st Leg for the Lancashire Senior Cup with only the one leg played.

24 April 1943 36	Bolton Wanderers	3–6	Liverpool	Bolton
	Goal	Report	Done; Hulligan; Kaye; Welsh	Stadium: Burnden Park; Attendance: 4,000
Note: Also counted as Semi-Final 1st Leg for the Lancashire Senior Cup.

26 April 1943 37	Liverpool	4–1	Everton	Liverpool
	Done 75'; Nieuwenhuys 86'; Balmer; Fagan (pen.)	Report	Goal	Stadium: Anfield; Attendance: 17,000
Note: Also counted for the Liverpool Senior Cup.

1 May 1943 38	Liverpool	4–0	Bolton Wanderers	Liverpool
	Done 13', 53'; Pearson 83'; Campbell 86'	Report		Stadium: Anfield; Attendance: 10,000; Referee: B. kitts
Note: Also counted as Semi-Final 2nd Leg for the Lancashire Senior Cup.

=== Lancashire Senior Cup Final ===
8 May 1943 1st Leg	Liverpool	1–3	Manchester United	Liverpool
	Nieuwenhuys 38'	Report	Pearson 9'; Bellis 43'; Rowley	Stadium: Anfield; Attendance: 12,117; Referee: J. Williams

15 May 1943 2nd Leg	Manchester United	3–3 (6–4 agg.)	Liverpool	Manchester
	Rowley 30', 34'; Roughton 55' (pen.)	Report	Balmer 38', 56', 73 '	Stadium: Maine Road; Attendance: 9,196; Referee: H. Holt
