= Thomas Douglas =

Thomas, Tom, or Tommy Douglas may refer to:

- Thomas Douglas (American judge) (1790–1855), Florida Supreme Court justice
- Thomas Douglas, 5th Earl of Selkirk (1771–1820), founder of the Red River Colony
- Thomas Monteath Douglas (1787–1868), officer of the Bengal Army of the East India Company
- Tom Douglas (chef) (born 1958), American chef, restaurateur and writer
- Tom Douglas (footballer) (1910–1943), Scottish footballer
- Tom Douglas (songwriter) (born 1953), American songwriter
- Tommy Douglas (1904–1986), premier of Saskatchewan and leader of the New Democratic Party of Canada
- Tommy Douglas (clarinetist) (1911–1965), American jazz clarinetist
- Tommy Douglas Collegiate, a high school in Saskatoon, Saskatchewan, Canada

== See also ==
- Thomas Douglas Guest (1781–1845), British painter
