= Arthur Frost =

Arthur Frost may refer to:

- Arthur Frost (footballer) (1915–1998), British football player
- Arthur Atwater Frost (1909–2002), American chemist, inventor of Frost diagrams
- A. B. Frost (Arthur Burdett Frost, 1851–1928), American artist
- Arthur George Frost, Canadian politician, member of the 24th and 25th Legislative Assembly of Ontario
