= Joe Meek (disambiguation) =

Joe Meek (1929–1967) was an English record producer, musician, sound engineer and songwriter.

Joe Meek may also refer to:

- Joseph Meek (1810–1875), mountain man
- Joe Meek (footballer) (1910–1976), English footballer

== See also ==
- A Life in the Death of Joe Meek
