= John Shafto =

John Shafto may refer to:

- John Shafto (footballer)
- John Shafto (MP)
