= Syd Goodfellow =

English footballer

Personal information
- Full name: Sydney Goodfellow
- Date of birth: 6 July 1915
- Place of birth: Wolstanton, England
- Date of death: 1998 (aged 82–83)
- Position: Inside left

Youth career
- Hanley
- Silverdale

Senior career*
Years	Team	Apps	(Gls)
1936–1937	Port Vale	16	(1)
1937–1938	Glentoran		
1938–1939	Rochdale	41	(2)
1946–1948	Chesterfield	80	(0)
1948–1950	Doncaster Rovers	66	(2)
1950–1952	Oldham Athletic	72	(2)
1952–1953	Accrington Stanley	28	(3)
- Wellington Town
- Stafford Rangers
- Oswestry Town
Total		303	(10)
- * Club domestic league appearances and goals

Sydney Goodfellow (6 July 1915 – 1998) was an English footballer. He made 303 league appearances in the Football League either side of World War II.

He began his professional career with Port Vale in 1936 and also played for Glentoran and Rochdale before the outbreak of the war in 1939. He signed with Chesterfield after the war before joining Doncaster Rovers in 1948. He helped the club to the Third Division North title in 1949–50. After this success, he spent two years with Oldham Athletic before seeing out his Football League career at Accrington Stanley in 1953. He later turned out for non-League sides Wellington Town, Stafford Rangers, and Oswestry Town, before emigrating to Australia in 1961.

== Career ==
Goodfellow played for Staffordshire non-League sides Hanley and Silverdale before joining Port Vale as an amateur in October 1936, signing professional forms in November that year. He played 14 consecutive games, scoring just the one goal before losing his place in January 1937. He played a further two games without scoring before leaving on a free transfer in April 1937, having scored one goal in 16 Third Division North games in 1936–37.

He moved on to Glentoran in Northern Ireland for the 1937–38 campaign before returning to England to sign with Rochdale. He played 41 of "Dale's" 42 Third Division North games in 1938–39, before his career was interrupted by World War II. After the war, he joined Chesterfield, then a Second Division side led by Bob Brocklebank. The "Spireites" posted a fourth-place finish in 1946–47, before falling down the table in 1947–48. Goodfellow played 80 league games for the club before he switched to Third Division North side Doncaster Rovers in May 1948.

At Doncaster he was "part of formidable Half back line with Syd Bycroft and Dave Miller". He played 33 games in 1948–49 and made 38 appearances in 1949–50, as "Donny" won promotion as the division's champions. He then moved on to Oldham Athletic in the Third Division North, making 72 league appearances in the 1950–51 and 1951–52 campaigns. Following, this he played 28 games under Walter Crook at Accrington Stanley in 1952–53. Stanley finished bottom of the Football League, and Goodfellow left Peel Park for non-League Wellington Town. He later played for Stafford Rangers and Oswestry Town. He emigrated to Australia in 1961.

== Career statistics ==
Appearances and goals by club, season and competition
Club	Season	League			FA Cup		Other		Total	
Club	Season	Division	Apps	Goals	Apps	Goals	Apps	Goals	Apps	Goals
Port Vale	1936–37	Third Division North	16	1	0	0	0	0	16	1
Rochdale	1938–39	Third Division North	41	2	1	0	1	0	43	2
Chesterfield	1945–46		0	0	2	0	0	0	2	0
Chesterfield	1946–47	Second Division	42	0	2	0	0	0	44	0
Chesterfield	1947–48	Second Division	38	0	1	0	0	0	39	0
Chesterfield	Total		80	0	5	0	0	0	85	0
Doncaster Rovers	1948–49	Third Division North	32	1	1	0	0	0	33	1
Doncaster Rovers	1949–50	Third Division North	34	1	4	0	0	0	38	1
Doncaster Rovers	Total		66	2	5	0	0	0	71	2
Oldham Athletic	1950–51	Third Division North	37	0	4	1	0	0	41	1
Oldham Athletic	1951–52	Third Division North	35	2	2	0	0	0	37	2
Oldham Athletic	Total		72	2	6	1	0	0	78	3
Accrington Stanley	1952–53	Third Division North	28	3	2	0	0	0	30	3
Career total			303	10	19	1	1	0	323	11

== Honours ==
Doncaster Rovers

- Football League Third Division North: 1949–50
