= Ken Ashbridge =

English footballer

Personal information
- Full name: Kenneth Ashbridge
- Date of birth: 12 November 1916
- Place of birth: Burnley, England
- Date of death: 2002 (aged 85–86)
- Height: 5 ft 11 in (1.80 m)
- Position: Goalkeeper

Senior career*
Years	Team	Apps	(Gls)
1935–1938	Burnley	1	(0)
1938	Halifax Town	1	(0)
- * Club domestic league appearances and goals

Kenneth Ashbridge (12 November 1916 – 2002) was an English professional footballer who played as a goalkeeper.

Ashbridge started his career with hometown club Burnley and made his debut in the 4–0 defeat to Manchester United on 13 April 1936. He lost his place in the team immediately and could not return to the team, failing to displace regular custodian Ted Adams from the starting line-up. He left Burnley in 1938 to join Halifax Town, where he played one more league game before retiring from professional football.
