= Jack Gallon =

English footballer

Personal information
- Full name: John William Gallon
- Date of birth: 12 February 1914
- Place of birth: Burradon, Northumberland, England
- Date of death: 1993 (aged 78–79)
- Height: 5 ft 6 in (1.68 m)
- Position: Inside forward

Senior career*
Years	Team	Apps	(Gls)
- Burradon Colliery Welfare
- Blyth Spartans
- Bedlington United
- Carlisle United
1936–1938	Bradford City	20	(5)
1938–1939	Bradford Park Avenue	31	(4)
1939–1946	Swansea Town	0	(0)
1946–1947	Gateshead	20	(2)
- North Shields
- Ashington
Total		71+	(11+)
- * Club domestic league appearances and goals

John William Gallon (12 February 1914 – 1993) was an English professional footballer who played as an inside forward.

== Career ==
Born in Burradon, Gallon played for Burradon Colliery Welfare, Blyth Spartans, Bedlington United, Carlisle United, Bradford City, Bradford Park Avenue, Swansea Town, Gateshead, North Shields and Ashington. For Bradford City he made 20 appearances in the Football League; he also made one appearance in the FA Cup. During World War II he played as a guest for Port Vale, Hartlepool United, Manchester United, Rochdale, Stockport County, Walsall, Bolton Wanderers, Bradford City, Bristol City, Gateshead, and Burnley.

== Career statistics ==
Appearances and goals by club, season and competition
Club	Season	League			FA Cup		Other		Total	
Club	Season	Division	Apps	Goals	Apps	Goals	Apps	Goals	Apps	Goals
Bradford City	1936–37	Second Division	9	0	1	1	0	0	10	1
Bradford City	1937–38	Third Division North	11	5	0	0	2	2	13	7
Bradford City	Total		20	5	1	1	2	2	23	8
Bradford Park Avenue	1937–38	Second Division	9	0	0	0	0	0	9	0
Bradford Park Avenue	1938–39	Second Division	22	4	1	1	0	0	23	5
Bradford Park Avenue	Total		31	4	1	1	0	0	32	5
Swansea Town	1939–40	–	0	0	0	0	3	0	3	0
Gateshead	1946–47	Third Division North	20	2	2	1	0	0	22	3

== Sources ==
- Frost, Terry (1988). Bradford City A Complete Record 1903-1988. Breedon Books Sport. ISBN 0-907969-38-0.
