= Archie Young (footballer) =

Scottish footballer

Personal information
- Full name: Archibald Wishart Young
- Date of birth: 10 December 1906
- Place of birth: Twechar, Scotland
- Date of death: 5 July 1980 (aged 73)
- Place of death: Exmouth, England
- Height: 6 ft 1 in (1.85 m)
- Positions: Left half; inside left

Senior career*
Years	Team	Apps	(Gls)
- Kilsyth Rangers
–1931	Dunipace Juniors		
1931–1932	Dunfermline Athletic		
1932–1935	Leicester City	14	(0)
1935–1936	Bristol Rovers	24	(0)
1936–1937	Exeter City	19	(0)
1937–1938	Gillingham	21	(0)
1938–1939	Rochdale	1	(0)
- Sligo Rovers
- * Club domestic league appearances and goals

Archibald Wishart Young (10 December 1906 – 5 July 1980) was a Scottish professional footballer who played in the Football League for Leicester City, Bristol Rovers, Exeter City, Gillingham and Rochdale as a left half. He also played in the Scottish League for Dunfermline Athletic.

== Career statistics ==
Appearances and goals by club, season and competition
Club	Season	League			FA Cup		Other		Total	
Club	Season	Division	Apps	Goals	Apps	Goals	Apps	Goals	Apps	Goals
Dunfermline Athletic	1931–32	Scottish Second Division	31	5	3	0	―		34	5
Leicester City	1932–33	First Division	5	0	0	0	―		5	0
Leicester City	1933–34	First Division	4	0	0	0	―		4	0
Leicester City	1934–35	First Division	5	0	1	0	―		6	0
Leicester City	Total		14	0	1	0	―		15	0
Bristol Rovers	1935–36	Third Division South	24	0	―		―		24	0
Gillingham	1937–38	Third Division South	21	0	1	0	1 (Note: Appearance in Third Division South Cup)	0	23	0
Rochdale	1938–39	Third Division North	1	0	0	0	0	0	1	0
Career total			91	5	5	0	1	0	97	5
