= Matthew Armstrong (English footballer) =

English footballer

Personal information
- Date of birth: 26 January 1919
- Place of birth: High Spen, County Durham, England
- Date of death: 12 July 1941 (aged 22)
- Height: 5 ft 10 in (1.78 m)
- Position: Wing half

Senior career*
Years	Team	Apps	(Gls)
1936–1939	Darlington	38	(2)
1939–19??	Aston Villa	0	(0)
- * Club domestic league appearances and goals

Matthew Armstrong (26 January 1919 – 12 July 1941) was an English footballer who made 38 appearances in the Football League playing as a wing half for Darlington in the 1930s. He joined Aston Villa in 1939 – a preview in the Daily Express highlighted him as one of "two young defenders who look as if they have that certain Soccer something" – but he never played for Villa's first team before the league was abandoned for the duration of the Second World War.

Armstrong was killed during the Second World War while serving as a private in 149 Field Ambulance, Royal Army Medical Corps. He was 22, and is commemorated on the Brookwood Memorial.
