= James Clarke (footballer, born 1913) =

English footballer

Personal information
- Full name: James Henry Clarke
- Date of birth: 1913
- Place of birth: Broomhill, England
- Position: Inside right

Senior career*
Years	Team	Apps	(Gls)
- Mexborough Athletic
1933–1936	Bradford City	9	(0)
- Goole Town
- Rotherham United
1944–1945	→ Chesterfield (war guest)	10	(3)
- * Club domestic league appearances and goals

James Henry Clarke (born 1913) was an English professional footballer who played as an inside right.

== Career ==
Born in Broomhill, Clarke played for Mexborough Athletic, Bradford City and Goole Town. For Bradford City he made nine appearances in the Football League.

He later played for Rotherham United and Chesterfield.

== Sources ==
- Frost, Terry (1988). Bradford City A Complete Record 1903-1988. Breedon Books Sport. ISBN 0-907969-38-0.
