= 1936–37 Bradford City A.F.C. season =

Bradford City A.F.C.
1936–37 season
- Manager: Dick Ray (until 28 February)
- Ground: Valley Parade
- Second Division: 21st
- FA Cup: Third round

The 1936–37 Bradford City A.F.C. season was the 30th in the club's history.

The club finished 21st in Division Two, and reached the 3rd round of the FA Cup. The club was relegated to Division Three North.

== Sources ==
- Frost, Terry (1988). Bradford City A Complete Record 1903-1988. Breedon Books Sport. ISBN 0-907969-38-0.
