= 1937–38 Bradford City A.F.C. season =

Bradford City A.F.C.
1937–38 season
- Ground: Valley Parade
- Third Division North: 14th
- FA Cup: Third round

The 1937–38 Bradford City A.F.C. season was the 31st in the club's history.

The club finished 14th in Division Three North, and reached the 3rd round of the FA Cup.

== Sources ==
- Frost, Terry (1988). Bradford City A Complete Record 1903-1988. Breedon Books Sport. ISBN 0-907969-38-0.
