= Fred Reeve =

English footballer

Personal information
- Full name: Frederick William Reeve
- Date of birth: 1 May 1918
- Place of birth: Clapton, England
- Date of death: 1994 (aged 75–76)
- Height: 5 ft 11 in (1.80 m)
- Position: Wing half

Senior career*
Years	Team	Apps	(Gls)
1934–1935	Ashford Town (Kent)		
1935–1937	Crystal Palace	1	(0)
1937–1938	Tottenham Hotspur	0	(0)
1938–1939	Rochdale	27	(3)
1939–1948	Grimsby Town	46	(0)
1948–1950	Reading	34	(1)
1950–1951	Ashford Town (Kent)		
1951–195?	Hastings United		
- * Club domestic league appearances and goals

Frederick William Reeve (1 May 1918 – 1994) was an English professional footballer who played as a wing half.
