= Arthur Griffiths (footballer, born 1908) =

Welsh footballer

Personal information
- Full name: Arthur Alexander Griffiths
- Date of birth: 23 April 1908
- Place of birth: Tonypandy, Wales
- Date of death: 1995 (aged 87)
- Position: Outside left

Senior career*
| Years | Team | Apps | (Gls) |
| 1930 | Barry | | |
| 1931–1932 | Torquay United | 5 | (1) |
| 1933–1934 | Newport County | 1 | (0) |
| 1934 | Barry | | |
| 1935 | Cheltenham Town | | |
| 1936 | Barry | | |
| 1937 | Newry Town | | |
| 1937 | Glentoran | | |
| 1938 | Rochdale | 14 | (5) |
| 1938–1939 | Stoke City | 4 | (0) |
| Total | | 24 | (6) |
- * Club domestic league appearances and goals

Arthur Alexander Griffiths (23 April 1908 – 1995) was a Welsh footballer who played in the Football League for Newport County, Rochdale, Stoke City and Torquay United.

== Career ==
Griffiths was born in Tonypandy had a nomadic career which started with Barry. He then joined Football League Third Division South side Torquay United and then Newport County before returning to Barry. After a spell at Cheltenham Town he returned to Barry again and then went to Northern Ireland to play for Newry Town and Glentoran. He returned to England to play for Rochdale and after scoring five goals in 14 matches he attracted the attention of First Division Stoke City but he played just four matches for Stoke before ending his career.

== Career statistics ==
| Club | Season | League | | | FA Cup | | Total | |
| Club | Season | Division | Apps | Goals | Apps | Goals | Apps | Goals |
|---|---|---|---|---|---|---|---|---|
| Torquay United | 1931–32 | Third Division South | 5 | 1 | 0 | 0 | 5 | 1 |
| Newport County | 1933–34 | Third Division South | 1 | 0 | 0 | 0 | 1 | 0 |
| Rochdale | 1938–39 | Third Division North | 14 | 5 | 0 | 0 | 14 | 5 |
| Stoke City | 1938–39 | First Division | 4 | 0 | 0 | 0 | 4 | 0 |
| Career total | | | 24 | 6 | 0 | 0 | 24 | 6 |
