= Frank Beresford (footballer) =

English footballer (1910–1974)

Personal information
- Date of birth: 8 October 1910
- Place of birth: Doncaster, England
- Date of death: 1974 (aged 63–64)
- Height: 5 ft 6 1/2 in (1.69 m)
- Position: Inside left

Senior career*
Years	Team	Apps	(Gls)
19??−1931	Owston Park Rangers		
1931−1934	Doncaster Rovers	56	(10)
1934–1935	Preston North End	36	(4)
1935–1936	Luton Town	12	
1936–1937	Crystal Palace	3	(0)
1937–1939	Carlisle United	68	(10)
1939	Bradford City	1	
- * Club domestic league appearances and goals

Francis E. Beresford (8 October 1910 − 1974) was an English footballer who played as an inside left with Doncaster Rovers, Preston North End, Luton Town, Crystal Palace, Carlisle United and Bradford City in the Football League.

Born in Doncaster, he played for local side Owston Park Rangers before moving to play with Division 3 North side Doncaster Rovers in 1931.

== Playing career ==
=== Doncaster Rovers ===
His debut, and only League appearance of the season, was on 10 October 1931 in a 3–1 home victory over Halifax Town. It was the following season he made his way into the team playing 29 games, scoring 5 goals in the FA Cup and League. His last game was on 17 February 1934 against Barrow.

Altogether, Beresford scored 11 goals in 62 games for Doncaster.

=== Preston North End ===
In February 1934, he was signed by Division 2 club Preston North End who at that time had Bill Shankly playing for them. Preston were promoted and Beresford played in the First Division, losing his place after a while.

=== Luton Town ===
At the end of that season he moved to Luton Town where he played 12 games.

=== Crystal Palace ===
He then went to Crystal Palace where he only made three appearances.

=== Carlisle United ===
Beresford moved to Carlisle United for two seasons, scoring 10 times in 68 games.

=== Bradford City ===
He only made one appearance for Bradford City before the outbreak of war and cancellation of the Football League competitions.

=== Wartime football ===
During the war players were allowed to make guest appearances for teams local to them to save on travel. Beresford turned out for his old club Doncaster as a guest in their first season, in the East Midlands War League scoring three times in 19 games.

== Honours ==
=== Preston North End ===
- Division 2 runner-up: 1933−34
