= George Lunn (footballer) =

English footballer (1915–2000)

Personal information
- Full name: George Lunn
- Date of birth: 28 June 1915
- Place of birth: Bolton upon Dearne, England
- Date of death: January 2000 (aged 84)
- Place of death: Birmingham, England
- Height: 6 ft 0 in (1.83 m)
- Position: Centre half

Senior career*
| Years | Team | Apps | (Gls) |
| –1938 | Frickley Colliery | | |
| 1938–1946 | Aston Villa | 0 | (0) |
| 1946 | Birmingham City | 0 | (0) |
| 1947–1948 | Watford | 5 | (0) |
| –1949 | Kidderminster Harriers | | |
| 1949–1950 | Bedford Town | | |
| 1950 | Halifax Town | | |
| 1951 | Rugby Town | | |
- * Club domestic league appearances and goals

George Lunn (28 June 1915 – January 2000) was an English professional footballer who played in the Football League for Watford as a centre half.

== Career statistics ==
Appearances and goals by club, season and competition
| Club | Season | League | | | FA Cup | | Total | |
| Club | Season | Division | Apps | Goals | Apps | Goals | Apps | Goals |
|---|---|---|---|---|---|---|---|---|
| Watford | 1947–48 | Third Division South | 5 | 0 | 2 | 0 | 7 | 0 |
| Career total | | | 5 | 0 | 2 | 0 | 7 | 0 |
