= Norman Richardson (footballer) =

English footballer

Personal information
- Date of birth: 15 April 1915
- Place of birth: Hamsterley, England
- Date of death: 1991 (aged 75–76)
- Height: 5 ft 9 1/2 in (1.77 m)
- Position: Defender

Senior career*
| Years | Team | Apps | (Gls) |
- Medomsley Juniors
| 1933–1935 | Bolton Wanderers | 0 | (0) |
| 1935–1951 | New Brighton | 213 | (0) |
- Chorley
- * Club domestic league appearances and goals

Norman Richardson (15 April 1915 – 1991) was an English footballer who played in the Football League for New Brighton.
