= John Connor (footballer, born 1914) =

English footballer

Personal information
- Date of birth: 1 February 1914
- Place of birth: Ashton-under-Lyne, England
- Date of death: 1978 (aged 63–64)
- Place of death: Manchester, England
- Position: Full back

Senior career*
Years	Team	Apps	(Gls)
- Mossley
1934–	Bolton Wanderers	29	(0)
- Mossley
1947–1949	Tranmere Rovers	46	(3)
Total		75	(3)
- * Club domestic league appearances and goals

John Connor (1914 – 1978) was an English footballer, who played as a full back in the Football League for Bolton Wanderers and Tranmere Rovers.
