= Jimmy Hughes (footballer) =

English footballer

Personal information
- Full name: James Hughes
- Date of birth: 29 August 1909
- Place of birth: Coxhoe, England
- Date of death: January 1966 (aged 56)
- Height: 5 ft 7 in (1.70 m)
- Positions: Inside forward; centre forward

Senior career*
Years	Team	Apps	(Gls)
	Northumberland Fusiliers	?	(?)
1934–1935	York City	15	(5)
1935	Hartlepools United	8	(3)
1935–1939	York City	91	(25)
1939	Hartlepools United	0	(0)
- * Club domestic league appearances and goals

James Hughes (29 August 1909 – January 1966) was an English footballer, who played as a forward.

== Career ==
Hughes was born in Coxhoe. He was a regular in the Army and served in the Second Battalion Northumberland Fusiliers. When stationed at Catterick, he played several games for York City reserves as an amateur in the 1933–34 season.

After leaving the forces, he signed professionally for York in August 1934. He joined Hartlepools United in 1935 after making 17 appearances and scoring 5 goals for York. He returned to York in the same year after making eight appearances and scoring three goals in the league for Hartlepool. He established himself in the side and played in all of the FA Cup ties of the 1936–37 and 1937–38 seasons. He rejoined Hartlepools in 1939 after making 109 appearances and scoring 28 goals in his second spell for York.

During World War II, he was a prisoner of war in Germany.
