= Harold Atkinson (footballer) =

English footballer (1925–2003)

Personal information
- Date of birth: 28 July 1925
- Place of birth: Bootle, England
- Date of death: 4 September 2003 (aged 78)
- Place of death: Wirral, England
- Position: Centre forward

Senior career*
Years	Team	Apps	(Gls)
????–1945	Carlton		
1945–1955	Tranmere Rovers	185	(91)
1955–????	Chesterfield		
- * Club domestic league appearances and goals

Harold Atkinson (28 July 1925 – 4 September 2003) was an English footballer who played as a centre forward for Carlton, Tranmere Rovers and Chesterfield. He made 197 appearances for Tranmere, scoring 104 goals.
