= John Barratt =

English footballer (1916–2002)

Personal information
- Date of birth: 23 January 1916
- Place of birth: Stafford, England
- Date of death: April 2002 (aged 86)
- Place of death: Stafford, England
- Height: 5 ft 11 in (1.80 m)
- Position: Defender

Senior career*
Years	Team	Apps	(Gls)
- Cannock Chase Colliery
1933–1937	Wolverhampton Wanderers	0	(0)
1937	Hednesford Town		
1937–1938	Stafford Rangers		
1938–1939	Rochdale	1	(0)
1939	Stafford Rangers		
- Chelmsford City
- * Club domestic league appearances and goals

John Barratt (23 January 1916 — April 2002) was an English professional footballer who played as a defender.

== Career ==
Barratt began his career at Cannock Chase Colliery, signing for Wolverhampton Wanderers in 1933. Barratt failed to make an appearance at Wolves, joining Hednesford Town in 1937. Later that year, Barratt signed for Stafford Rangers. In February 1938, Barratt signed for Rochdale. At Rochdale, Barratt made his only Football League appearance, playing in a 1–1 draw against Doncaster Rovers on 6 September 1938. In 1939, Barratt returned to Stafford Rangers. Later that year, Barratt signed for Chelmsford City.
