= Stan Charlesworth =

English footballer

Personal information
- Full name: Stanley Charlesworth
- Date of birth: 10 March 1920
- Place of birth: Conisbrough, England
- Date of death: March 2003 (aged 82–83)
- Position: Defender

Senior career*
Years	Team	Apps	(Gls)
- Conisbrough Welfare
- Wath Wanderers
1938–1946	Grimsby Town	2	(0)
1946	Barnsley	7	(0)
- Gainsborough Trinity
Total		9	(0)
- * Club domestic league appearances and goals

Stanley Charlesworth (10 March 1920 – March 2003) was an English footballer who played in the Football League for Barnsley and Grimsby Town.
