= Teddy Ashton =

English footballer

Personal information
- Full name: Edward Ashton
- Date of birth: 19 January 1906
- Place of birth: Kilnhurst, England
- Date of death: 1978 (aged 72)
- Place of death: Kilnhurst, England
- Height: 5 ft 5 1/2 in (1.66 m)
- Position: Outside left

Youth career
- Kilnhurst WMC

Senior career*
Years	Team	Apps	(Gls)
- Kilnhurst Athletic
1926–1927	Mexborough Athletic		
1927–1936	Barnsley	289	(70)
1936–1938	Sheffield United	35	(4)
1938–1939	Carlisle United	29	(8)
1939	Barnsley	0	(0)
- Grantham
- * Club domestic league appearances and goals

Edward Ashton (19 January 1906 – 1978), was an English footballer who played as an outside left. Born in the mining village of Kilnhurst, Ashton worked in the local pit while playing as a part-time professional for Mexborough Town. Signed by Barnsley for £200 in November 1927, Ashton made his Football League debut in April 1928 against Nottingham Forest and went on to play over 300 games for the Tykes in all competitions. Ashton signed for Sheffield United on a free transfer in October 1936 but was past his best and was unable to hold down a regular first team place. Released in the summer of 1938 he signed with Carlisle United, but with the onset of World War II Ashton enlisted and served in the army before later returning to his job as a miner.
