= Ted Adams (footballer) =

English footballer

Personal information
- Full name: Edward Fairclough Adams
- Date of birth: 30 November 1906
- Place of birth: Anfield, England
- Date of death: 30 November 1991 (aged 85)
- Place of death: Burnley, England
- Height: 5 ft 9 in (1.75 m)
- Position: Goalkeeper

Senior career*
Years	Team	Apps	(Gls)
1927–1928	Liverpool	0	(0)
1928–1929	Burscough Rangers	?	(?)
1929–1930	Manchester Central	?	(?)
1930–1931	Connah's Quay & Shotton	?	(?)
1931	Barrow	0	(0)
1931–1935	Wrexham	89	(0)
1935	Southport	13	(0)
1935–1940	Burnley	111	(0)
- * Club domestic league appearances and goals

Edward Fairclough Adams (30 November 1906 – 30 November 1991) was an English professional footballer who played as a goalkeeper between 1927 and 1940.
