= Tommy Prest =

English footballer (1908–1987)

Personal information
- Full name: Thomas Walsh Prest
- Date of birth: 4 February 1908
- Place of birth: Darwen, England
- Date of death: 1987 (aged 78 or 79)
- Height: 5 ft 8 in (1.73 m)
- Position: Inside forward

Senior career*
Years	Team	Apps	(Gls)
1929–1935	Burnley	80	(16)
1935–1937	Brighton & Hove Albion	27	(5)
1937–1938	Aldershot	16	(1)
1938–1939	Rochdale	21	(6)
- * Club domestic league appearances and goals

Thomas Walsh Prest (4 February 1908 – 1987) was an English professional footballer who played as an inside forward.
