= Joe Hargreaves (footballer, born 1915) =

English footballer

Personal information
- Full name: Joseph Albert Hargreaves
- Date of birth: 30 October 1915
- Place of birth: Accrington, England
- Date of death: 19 July 1992 (aged 77)
- Position: Forward

Senior career*
| Years | Team | Apps | (Gls) |
| 1945 | Rossendale United | 4 | (8) |
| 1945-48 | Rochdale | 35 | (24) |
| 1948 | Stalybridge Celtic | | |
- * Club domestic league appearances and goals

Joe Hargreaves (1915-1992) was an English footballer who played as a forward for Rossendale United, Rochdale and Stalybridge Celtic.

In the 1945-46 season he scored 6 goals in 6 matches for Rochdale in the F.A. Cup, and was also a prolific goalscorer in the final wartime league season.

In the 1946-47 season, he was the top goalscorer for Rochdale.
