= Sid Rawlings =

English footballer

Personal information
- Full name: James Sidney Dean Rawlings
- Date of birth: 5 May 1913
- Place of birth: Wombwell, West Riding of Yorkshire, England
- Date of death: 1956 (aged 42–43)
- Height: 5 ft 6 1/2 in (1.69 m)
- Position: Winger

Senior career*
Years	Team	Apps	(Gls)
1932–1934	Preston North End	12	(0)
1934–1935	Huddersfield Town	11	(2)
1935–1936	West Bromwich Albion	10	(1)
1936–1937	Northampton Town	48	(18)
1937–1939	Millwall	53	(27)
1946–1948	Plymouth Argyle	56	(20)
- * Club domestic league appearances and goals

James Sidney Dean Rawlings (5 May 1913 – 1956) was an English professional footballer, who played for Preston North End, Huddersfield Town, West Bromwich Albion, Northampton Town, Millwall and Plymouth Argyle (1946/47 & 1947/48 seasons). He was born in Wombwell, West Riding of Yorkshire.

Rawlings played for Everton FC during World War II having initially played on loan from Millwall and then signing permanently in 1940. He also made a few guest appearances for Liverpool. Previous to his move to Everton he had played in Millwall's run to the final of Football League War Cup, which they lost to Chelsea in front of a Wembley crowd of 90,000. After ending his professional career at Plymouth Argyle he continued to play locally for Tavistock and subsequently managed them for a short period. He died in 1956 from leukemia.

Film still exists on the web of Rawlings training with the Millwall players as covered by Pathe News. Photographs also exist of the Millwall semi-final, showing where Rawlings and the other players being presented to the King prior to the match.
