= Jimmy Wynn (footballer) =

English footballer

Personal information
- Full name: James Wynn
- Date of birth: 4 September 1910
- Place of birth: Wallsend, England
- Date of death: 26 May 1986 (aged 75)
- Place of death: Fir Vale, Sheffield
- Height: 5 ft 9 in (1.75 m)
- Position: Inside forward

Senior career*
Years	Team	Apps	(Gls)
1926	Swan Hunter		
1927	Jarrow Imperial		
1928	Blyth Spartans		
1929	North Shields		
1930	Blyth Spartans		
1931	Swan Hunter		
1931	Jarrow Imperial		
1932	Wallsend		
1933–1934	Sheffield Wednesday		
1935–1936	Southport	31	(6)
1936	Rotherham United	5	(1)
1937–1941	Rochdale	86	(64)
1946	Scunthorpe & Lindsey United		
Total		122	(71)
- * Club domestic league appearances and goals

James Wynn (1910–1986) was an English footballer who played as an inside forward for several clubs, and was a prolific goal scorer for Rochdale.

Wynn died on 26 May 1986.
