= Alf Ainsworth =

English footballer

Personal information
- Full name: Alphonso Ainsworth
- Date of birth: 31 July 1913
- Place of birth: Manchester, England
- Date of death: 25 April 1975 (aged 61)
- Place of death: Rochdale, England
- Height: 5 ft 6 in (1.68 m)
- Position: Inside forward

Youth career
- ?–1933: Ashton United
- 1933–1934: Manchester United

Senior career*
Years	Team	Apps	(Gls)
1934–1935	Manchester United	2	(0)
1935–1939	New Brighton	150	(39)
1939–1940	→ Accrington Stanley (guest)	4	(1)
1944	→ Bury (guest)	3	(2)
1940–1942	→ Rochdale (guest)	5	(1)
1944–1945	→ Rochdale (guest)	7	(0)
1942	→ Southport (guest)	1	(0)
1942–1944	→ Oldham Athletic (guest)	27	(3)
1946–1947	New Brighton	28	(9)
1947–1948	Congleton Town	14	(5)
- * Club domestic league appearances and goals

Alphonso Ainsworth (31 July 1913 – 25 April 1975) was an English professional footballer, who played as an inside forward. Born in Manchester, he played for Manchester United, New Brighton and Congleton Town, as well as a number of clubs in Lancashire during the Second World War.

== Career ==
=== Pre-war ===
Ainsworth began his career at Ashton United in the Cheshire County League, but signed for Manchester United as an amateur in 1933. On 13 February 1934, he signed his first professional contract with the club, and made his debut in a home game against Bury on 3 March 1934. However, he only made one more appearance for the club, and joined New Brighton in September 1935, making 150 pre-war appearances and scoring 39 goals for the club.

=== Wartime ===
After World War II broke out in 1939, Ainsworth played for a number of clubs in the wartime leagues. His first wartime club was Accrington Stanley, but he also played for Bury, Rochdale, Southport and Oldham Athletic.

=== Post-war ===
Ainsworth re-registered with New Brighton after the war, and scored a further nine goals in 28 appearances. In December 1947, however, Ainsworth transferred to Congleton Town, where he would play until his retirement.
