= Jimmy Constantine =

English footballer

James Joseph Constantine (16 February 1920 – 4 September 1998) was an English professional footballer, who played as a forward for Rochdale, Manchester City, Bury and Millwall.

Constantine's football career started during World War II. He served in the Grenadier Guards, playing for local team Ashton National in his spare time. In 1944 he received an offer of a professional football contract at Rochdale. Three months later he joined Manchester City, playing his first Manchester City match in September 1945. At this time competitive league football was still suspended, though the FA Cup took place. Constantine scored 4 Cup goals and 25 in the Football League North to be the club's highest scorer in 1945–46. When competitive league returned in 1946, Constantine scored 12 goals in 18 games, including a hat-trick against Millwall. Injuries then limited his first-team opportunities, and he was transferred to Bury, where he scored 14 goals in 32 matches.

In the 1948 close season he signed for Millwall in a part exchange deal which saw Bob Kelly go to Bury. He made his debut against Port Vale on 21 August 1948, and subsequently played for Millwall for four seasons, finishing as the club's top goalscorer in three of them.

One of the most outstanding games Constantine played for The Lions was on 23 October 1948 against Notts County at The Den where a crowd of 46,000 had gathered to watch the great Tommy Lawton. Millwall and Constantine played brilliantly and won the game 3 – 2 with Constantine netting a brace. The newspaper headlines the following day read: "Constantine Shows Lawton How To Head." He made 153 appearances for The Lions, scoring 80 goals, and is fifth on Millwall's all-time leading scorer list.

Constantine remained a Millwall supporter, and was a regular in the Duke of Albany pub, in New Cross where he mixed freely with The Lions fans, sharing a joke and happily signing autographs until his death which was due to stomach cancer in 1998.
