= Tom Douglas (footballer) =

Scottish footballer

Personal information
- Full name: Thomas Alexander Douglas
- Date of birth: 11 September 1910
- Place of birth: Ayr, Scotland
- Date of death: 6 March 1943 (aged 32)
- Place of death: French Algeria
- Position: Inside forward

Senior career*
| Years | Team | Apps | (Gls) |
| 1927–1931 | Motherwell | 7 | (4) |
| 1931–1933 | Blackpool | 60 | (17) |
| 1933–1936 | Burnley | 63 | (13) |
| 1936–1938 | Witton Albion | | |
| 1938–1938 | Rochdale | 8 | (0) |
- * Club domestic league appearances and goals

Thomas Alexander Douglas (11 September 1910 – 6 March 1943) was a Scottish professional association footballer who played as an inside forward.

== Personal life ==
Douglas served as a sapper in the Royal Engineers during the Second World War and died on active service in French Algeria on 6 March 1943. He is buried at El Alia Cemetery.
