= Eric Keen =

English footballer and manager (1910–1984)

Personal information
- Full name: Errington Ridley Liddell Keen
- Date of birth: 4 October 1910
- Place of birth: Walker, Newcastle upon Tyne, England
- Date of death: July 1984 (aged 73)
- Place of death: Fulham, England
- Position: Left half

Youth career
- Newcastle Schools
- Nun's Moor
- Newcastle Swifts

Senior career*
Years	Team	Apps	(Gls)
1926–1930	Newcastle United	1	(0)
1930–1938	Derby County	219	(4)
1938–1939	Chelmsford City	15	(1)
1939–1940	Hereford United		
- Leeds United
- Bacup Borough
Total		235+	(5+)

International career
1932–1936	England	4	(0)

Managerial career
- 1939–1940: Hereford United
- 1947–1948: Egypt
- 1948: Hong Kong
- 1949: IFK Norrköping
- 1949–1950: Beşiktaş
- * Club domestic league appearances and goals

Errington Ridley Liddell Keen (4 October 1910 – July 1984) was an English football player and manager. Keen played at both professional and international levels, before becoming a coach at national and international level in Europe and Africa.

== Career ==
=== Playing career ===
Born in Walker, Newcastle upon Tyne, Keen, who played as a left half, played club football for Newcastle Schools, Nun's Moor, Newcastle Swifts, Newcastle United, Derby County, Chelmsford City, Hereford United, Leeds United and Bacup Borough.

He also earned four caps for England between 1932 and 1936. Making his debut in a friendly match against Austria on 7 December 1932.

=== Coaching career ===
Keen was player-manager of Hereford United between 1939 and 1940.

Keen managed Egypt between 1947 and 1948, and was in charge at the 1948 Summer Olympics.

Keen later managed Hong Kong in 1948, Swedish club side IFK Norrköping and Turkish club side Beşiktaş between 1949 and 1950.

== Later life ==
Keen died in July 1984.
