= Tom Jones (footballer, born 1916) =

English footballer

Personal information
- Full name: Thomas Jones
- Date of birth: 1916
- Place of birth: Little Hulton
- Position: Central defender

Senior career*
Years	Team	Apps	(Gls)
1936	Little Hulton		
1938	Accrington Stanley	10	(1)
1939	Oldham Athletic	1	(0)
1940-1944	→Rochdale (guest)		
Total		11	(1)
- * Club domestic league appearances and goals

Thomas Jones (1916 – date of death unknown) was an English footballer who played as a central defender for Accrington Stanley and Oldham Athletic, and guested for Rochdale during World War II. He was born in Little Hulton. His career came to an end in 1945 when he lost both feet to a land mine after the D-Day Landings.

== Career statistics ==
Club	Season	League			FA Cup		League Cup		Total	
Club	Season	Division	Apps	Goals	Apps	Goals	Apps	Goals	Apps	Goals
Accrington Stanley	1937–38	Third Division North	1	0	0	0	0	0	1	0
Accrington Stanley	1938–39	Third Division North	9	1	0	0	0	0	9	1
Oldham Athletic	1938–39	Third Division North	1	0	0	0	0	0	1	0
Career total			11	1	0	0	0	0	11	1
