= John Gastall =

English footballer (1913–1997)

Personal information
- Full name: John William Holden Gastall
- Date of birth: 25 March 1913
- Place of birth: Oswaldtwistle, England
- Date of death: 1997 (aged 83–84)
- Height: 5 ft 9 in (1.75 m)
- Position: Centre forward

Senior career*
Years	Team	Apps	(Gls)
1930–1931	Blackburn Rovers	0	(0)
	Burscough Rangers	?	(?)
	Darwen	?	(?)
	Bacup Borough	?	(?)
1936–1938	Burnley	21	(7)
1938–1939	Accrington Stanley	8	(2)
1939	Rochdale	4	(1)
- * Club domestic league appearances and goals

John William Holden Gastall (25 May 1913 – 1997) was an English professional association footballer who played as a centre forward.
