= Joe Meek (footballer) =

English footballer

Personal information
- Full name: Joseph Meek
- Date of birth: 31 May 1910
- Place of birth: Hazlerigg, Newcastle upon Tyne, England
- Date of death: 1976 (aged 65–66)
- Height: 5 ft 6 in (1.68 m)
- Position: Inside right

Senior career*
Years	Team	Apps	(Gls)
- Newcastle Co–op
- Seaton Delaval
- Stockton
1929	Middlesbrough	0	(0)
1930–1934	Gateshead	135	(50)
1934–1935	Bradford Park Avenue	31	(11)
1935–1938	Tottenham Hotspur	45	(15)
1938–1939	Swansea Town	19	(6)
- * Club domestic league appearances and goals

Joseph Meek (31 May 1910 – 1976) was an English professional footballer who played for Newcastle Co-op, Seaton Delaval, Stockton, Middlesbrough, Gateshead, Bradford Park Avenue, Tottenham Hotspur and Swansea Town.

== Football career ==
Meek played non-League football for Newcastle Co–op and Seaton Delaval before having an unsuccessful trial at Liverpool in 1927. Meek, an inside right, had spells at Stockton and Middlesbrough. In 1930 he joined Gateshead where he featured in 135 matches and netted 50 goals. After playing for Bradford Park Avenue, Meek signed for Tottenham Hotspur. Between 1935 and 1938 he played a total 51 matches and scored on 16 occasions in all competitions for the Spurs. Meek ended his career at Swansea Town.
