= Eric Wood (footballer) =

English footballer (1920–2000)

Personal information
- Full name: Eric Wood
- Date of birth: 19 March 1920
- Place of birth: Bolton
- Date of death: 2000 (aged 79–80)
- Position: Wing half

Senior career*
Years	Team	Apps	(Gls)
1939	Bolton Wanderers	0	(0)
1945-1951	Rochdale	148	(15)
Total		148	(15)
- * Club domestic league appearances and goals

Eric Wood (13 March 1920 – 2000) was an English footballer who played as a wing half for Rochdale.

In 1939, Wood was on the books of Bolton Wanderers but never made a first team appearance, due to the outbreak of World War II.

Wood first played for Rochdale in the war-time league and also the FA Cup on its return in 1945-46. He made his league debut in the 1946-47 season and remained at Rochdale throughout his career, clocking up 148 appearances and 15 goals. He retired in 1951.

Wood died in 2000.
