= James Harrison (footballer, born 1914) =

English footballer

Personal information
- Date of birth: 1914
- Place of birth: Bolton, England
- Position: Winger

Senior career*
Years	Team	Apps	(Gls)
1936–1937	Hibernian	20	(5)
1937	Cardiff City	1	(0)
- * Club domestic league appearances and goals

James Harrison (born 1914) was an English professional footballer who played as a winger. After beginning his career in Scotland with Hibernian, he joined Cardiff City in March 1937. He made one appearance for the club in a 1–1 draw with Bristol Rovers before being released. He later made 22 appearances for Rochdale during World War II, scoring 5 goals.
