= Tom Sneddon (footballer, born 1912) =

Scottish footballer and coach

Personal information
- Full name: Thomas Sneddon
- Date of birth: 22 August 1912
- Place of birth: Livingston, Scotland
- Date of death: 11 December 1983 (aged 71)
- Place of death: Chadwell Heath, England
- Position: Full-back

Senior career*
Years	Team	Apps	(Gls)
- Queen of the South
1937–1947	Rochdale	67	(0)

Managerial career
- 1947–1948: Slovan Bratislava
- 1948: Netherlands
- 1954–1956: Hong Kong
Medal record
Men's football
Representing Hong Kong (as manager)
AFC Asian Cup
Third place	1956
- * Club domestic league appearances and goals

Tom Sneddon (22 August 1912 – 11 December 1983) was a Scottish football player and coach.

== Career ==
Sneddon played as a full-back for Queen of the South and Rochdale.

He was manager of Czechoslovak club Slovan Bratislava during the 1947–48 season, and he managed the Netherlands national team in 1948. He was also in charge of Hong Kong between 1954 and 1956, taking them to third place at the 1956 AFC Asian Cup.

== Honours ==
=== As Manager ===
Hong Kong

- AFC Asian Cup: 3rd place, 1956
