= Arthur Frost (footballer) =

English footballer

Arthur Douglas Frost (1 December 1915 – October 1998) was an English professional footballer, playing as a forward, before the Second World War.

Arthur Frost was born in Liverpool and played football in the army where he served with the South Lancashire Regiment. He joined New Brighton as an amateur in July 1938, turning professional the following month. He scored on his League debut and in March 1939, after just 23 league games, in which he scored 18 times, he moved to Newcastle United for a fee of £2,515. He went straight into the Newcastle first team and had scored 1 goal in 5 League appearances by the end of the season.

The war scuppered Frost's career, he guested for New Brighton and Southport during the war and was player-manager of South Liverpool as football resumed for the 1946–47 season.

Arthur Frost died in Sefton North in October 1998, aged 82.
