= George Haigh =

English footballer (1915–2019)

Personal information
- Full name: George Haigh
- Date of birth: 29 June 1915
- Place of birth: Reddish, England
- Date of death: 23 April 2019 (aged 103)
- Position: Centre-back

Youth career
- 1931–1936: Manchester City
- 1936–1938: Stockport County

Senior career*
Years	Team	Apps	(Gls)
1938–1940	Stockport County	2	(0)
1940–1942	Morecambe		
1942–1945	Rochdale		
1945–1946	Lancaster City		
1948–1952	Rossendale United	109	(2)

Managerial career
- 1948–1952: Rossendale United (player-manager)
Military career
Allegiance	United Kingdom
Branch	Royal Air Force
Service years	1940–1945
Rank	Squadron leader
Conflicts	World War II
- * Club domestic league appearances and goals

George Haigh (26 June 1915 – 23 April 2019) was an English professional footballer, mainly known for his association with Stockport County. At the age of 103, he was the oldest surviving former County player, and had been widely attributed for being the oldest surviving former professional footballer, although Arthur Smith was one month older at the time of Haigh's death.

== Career ==
Haigh's career started at Manchester City in 1931, as a junior. He played in the reserves alongside Frank Swift, but when Swift was promoted to the senior side, Haigh stayed where he was. During his time at City, he also worked in a dying and bleaching factory. In 1936, he joined Stockport County, where he played at all levels for County, from the A team right up to the first team. Haigh had the misfortune to score an own goal on his debut for County, and made a second league appearance before the outbreak of the Second World War.

In 1940, he enlisted in the Royal Air Force, serving as a physical training instructor and was stationed at RAF Morecambe and RAF Wilmslow, where he trained new recruits and parachutists. He reached the rank of flight sergeant before being commissioned an acting pilot officer (on probation) on 20 June 1941, and was regraded as a pilot officer (on probation) on 20 August. Whilst at Morecambe, he played for the services team as well as the town's football team, and in 1942, joined Rochdale. Rochdale often played Blackpool, and Haigh was usually tasked to mark Stanley Matthews. During wartime, he also made guest appearances for Walsall and Burnley. On 20 June 1942, Haigh was confirmed in the rank of pilot officer, and was promoted to flying officer (war-substantive) on 20 August. He was promoted to flight lieutenant (war-substantive) on 11 September 1944, and was mentioned in despatches in 1945, ending his service with the rank of squadron leader.

In 1945, he was offered the player-manager position at Arbroath, but Haigh decided to join Lancaster City as they had offered him a trade as a metal spinner, as well as the captaincy of the team. Coincidentally, the club already had a player who owned an engineering firm, so Haigh was able to train during the week and play for the club on the weekends. The following year, Haigh was later discharged as a sergeant. In 1948, he was appointed as player-manager for Rossendale United. Haigh had been vocal about his time at Rossendale, as he was constantly undermined by the board of directors over prospective new players, so he resigned in 1952, effectively ending his career in football.

In 1998, County's club historians got back in touch with Haigh (and even then, he was considered one of the oldest surviving former professional footballers). He maintained regular contact with the club, appearing as a guest of honour in 2008. In 2010, he was one of the first recipients of a Stockport County Appearance Number certificate. He continued to watch County home and away up until after his 100th birthday, but made special appearances after that, notably in November 2018 when he unveiled a plaque at Edgley Park commemorating former players who died in World War I. Haigh suffered from age-related macular degeneration and, until at least 2015, received support from Blind Veterans UK, the national charity for blind and vision-impaired ex-Service men and women.
