= Wally Reynolds =

English footballer

Personal information
- Full name: Walter Reynolds
- Date of birth: 24 November 1911
- Place of birth: Ecclesall, England
- Date of death: 1995 (aged 83 or 84)
- Height: 5 ft 9 in (1.75 m)
- Position: Winger

Senior career*
Years	Team	Apps	(Gls)
1929–1930	Sheffield Wednesday	0	(0)
1930–1931	Leeds United	0	(0)
1931–1932	Clapton Orient	2	(0)
1932–1933	Burnley	19	(3)
1933–1935	Newport County	59	(4)
1935–1938	Accrington Stanley	125	(28)
1938	York City	3	(0)
1938–1939	Rochdale	22	(4)
- * Club domestic league appearances and goals

Walter Reynolds (24 November 1911 – 1995) was an English professional footballer who played as a winger.
