= Joe Duff =

English footballer

Personal information
- Full name: Joseph Hunter Duff
- Date of birth: 1 May 1913
- Place of birth: Ashington
- Date of death: 1985 (aged 71–72)
- Height: 5 ft 8 in (1.73 m)
- Position: Inside forward

Senior career*
Years	Team	Apps	(Gls)
1931	Wallaw United		
1932	Ashington		
1932–1933	Newcastle United	0	(0)
1934	Horden Colliery Welfare		
1935–1946	Rochdale	132	(26)
1946	Cheltenham Town		
1947	Bangor		
Total		132	(26)
- * Club domestic league appearances and goals

Joseph Hunter Duff (1 May 1913 – 1985) was an English footballer who made 126 appearances in the Football League playing as an inside forward for Rochdale.

== Career statistics ==
Appearances and goals by club, season and competition
Club	Season	League			FA Cup		3rd Div. North Cup		Total	
Club	Season	Division	Apps	Goals	Apps	Goals	Apps	Goals	Apps	Goals
Rochdale	1935–36	Third Division North	31	10	1	0	1	1	33	11
Rochdale	1936–37	Third Division North	42	1	1	0	0	0	43	1
Rochdale	1937–38	Third Division North	18	1	2	0	0	0	20	1
Rochdale	1938–39	Third Division North	41	14	1	1	1	0	43	15
Rochdale	1945–46	Third Division North	0	0	5	0	0	0	5	0
Career total			132	26	10	1	2	1	144	28
