= Wally Hunt =

English footballer and cricketer (1909–1963)

- Born: Samuel Walter Hunt; 9 January 1909; Doe Lea, England
- Died: 2 August 1963 (aged 54); Rochdale, England
Association football career
- Position: Forward
Senior career*
Years	Team	Apps	(Gls)
- Welbeck Colliery Welfare
1933	Lincoln City	3	(0)
1934	Mansfield Town	29	(14)
1935	Torquay United	27	(8)
1936–1937	Rochdale	58	(31)
1937	Stockport County	11	(2)
1938	Accrington Stanley	5	(1)
1938–1939	Carlisle United	33	(34)
Total		166	(90)
- * Club domestic league appearances and goals
- Cricket career

Cricket information
- Batting: Right-handed
- Bowling: Leg-break

Domestic team information
- Years: Team
- 1936: Derbyshire
- FC debut: 3 June 1936 Derbyshire v Northamptonshire
- Last FC: 15 July 1936 Derbyshire v Kent

Career statistics
Competition	First-class
Matches	5
Runs scored	48
Batting average	9.60
100s/50s	0/0
Top score	17
Balls bowled	6
Wickets	0
Bowling average	–
5 wickets in innings	–
10 wickets in match	–
Best bowling	–
Catches/stumpings	0/–
- Source: CricketArchive, February 2012

Samuel Walter Hunt (9 January 1909 – 2 August 1963) was an English professional footballer who played in the Football League for Lincoln City, Mansfield Town, Torquay United, Rochdale, Stockport County, Accrington Stanley and Carlisle United.

Hunt was also a cricketer who played for Derbyshire in 1936.

Hunt was born in the Derbyshire village of Doe Lea. Hunt made his debut for Derbyshire in the 1936 season in a match against Northamptonshire in May when he made his top score of 17 in his single innings. He played sporadically during Derbyshire's only County Championship-winning season and was never on the losing side of a Derbyshire match.

Hunt was a right-handed middle-order batsman who played 5 innings in 5 first-class matches. His top score was 17 and his average 9.6. He was a leg-break bowler who bowled one over without taking a wicket.

In 1950 for one season, Hunt represented Northumberland in the Minor Counties Championship.

Hunt died at the age of 54 in Rochdale.
