= Bill Byrom =

English footballer

Personal information
- Full name: William Byrom
- Date of birth: 30 March 1915
- Place of birth: Blackburn, England
- Date of death: March 1989
- Place of death: Surrey, England
- Position: Full-back

Senior career*
Years	Team	Apps	(Gls)
1934–1936	Rossendale United	3	(1)
1937–1939	Burnley	0	(0)
1939	Queens Park Rangers	0	(0)
1946–1948	Rochdale	30	(0)
1948–	Stalybridge Celtic		
- * Club domestic league appearances and goals

William Byrom (30 March 1915 – March 1989) was an English professional footballer who played as a full-back in the Football League for Burnley, Queens Park Rangers and Rochdale and in non-League football for Rossendale United and Stalybridge Celtic.
