= Ted Goodier =

English footballer and manager

Personal information
- Full name: Edward Goodier
- Date of birth: 15 October 1902
- Place of birth: Farnworth, England
- Date of death: 4 November 1967 (aged 65)
- Place of death: Farnworth, England
- Height: 6 ft 1 in (1.85 m)
- Position: Wing half

Youth career
- 1919–1922: Brookhouse United

Senior career*
Years	Team	Apps	(Gls)
1922–1923	Huddersfield Town	0	(0)
1923–1925	Lancaster Town		
1925–1931	Oldham Athletic	113	(2)
1931–1935	Queens Park Rangers	139	(2)
1935–1936	Watford	1	(0)
1936–1937	Crewe Alexandra	41	(1)
1937–1944	Rochdale	67	(1)

Managerial career
- 1938–1943: Rochdale (player-manager)
- 1943: Birmingham
- 1943–1952: Rochdale
- 1952–1954: Wigan Athletic
- 1956–1958: Oldham Athletic
- * Club domestic league appearances and goals

Edward Goodier (15 October 1902 – 4 November 1967) was an English professional footballer and football manager. Born in Farnworth, Lancashire, he played as a wing half for Huddersfield Town, Lancaster Town, Oldham Athletic, Queens Park Rangers, Watford, Crewe Alexandra and Rochdale. He was appointed player-manager at Rochdale in 1938, and continued in that capacity during the Second World War until appointed team manager of Birmingham in August 1943. His contract included provision for a two-year appointment after the war, but after two months in post, he requested and obtained his release for domestic reasons, after which he rejoined Rochdale as secretary-manager. He went on to manage Wigan Athletic and Oldham Athletic. He died in his native Farnworth at the age of 65.
