= Thomas Clarke =

Thomas or Tom Clarke may refer to:

== Politicians ==
- Thomas Clarke (died 1754) (c. 1672–1754), British lawyer and politician, MP for Hertford
- Thomas Clarke (Australian politician) (1846–1922), member of the New South Wales Legislative Assembly
- Tom Clarke (politician) (born 1941), British Member of Parliament 1982–2015
- Tom Clarke (Irish republican) (1858–1916)
- Thomas J. Clarke (Alabama politician) (born 1842/3), Alabama politician

== Musicians ==
- Tom Clarke (musician) (born 1986), lead singer of The Enemy
- Tom "Sparkles*" Clarke (born 1988), lead singer of Area 11

== Religious figures ==
- Thomas Clarke (Dean of Barbados) (died 1900), British colonial Anglican priest
- Thomas Clarke (Archdeacon of Macclesfield) (1907–1965), British Anglican priest in the third quarter of the 20th century

== Sportspeople ==
- T. B. A. Clarke (Thomas Bishop Andrews Clarke, 1868–1909), English footballer
- Tom Clarke (Australian footballer) (1906–1981), Australian rules footballer who played for Essendon
- Thomas Clarke (skeleton racer) (1911–1969), British skeleton racer
- Tom Clarke (footballer, born 1987), currently with Fleetwood Town
- Thomas Clarke (footballer) (born 1989), formerly with Yeovil Town
- Thomas Clarke (cricketer) (1839–1892), Barbadian cricketer

== Others ==
- Sir Thomas Clarke (judge) (1703–1764), English master of the rolls, 1754–1764
- Thomas Clarke (painter), Irish painter
- Thomas Clarke (British Army officer) (died 1799)
- Thomas Curtis Clarke (1827–1901), railway engineer, builder and author
- Thomas B. Clarke (1848–1931), art collector from New York City
- Tom Clarke (Irish republican) (1857–1916), revolutionary leader involved in the 1916 Easter Rising
- Thomas Shields Clarke (1860–1920), American artist
- Tom Clarke (writer) (1918–1993), British television writer
- Thomas Clarke (professor) (fl. 2000s), British professor
- Thomas Clarke (bushranger) (c. 1840–1867), Australian bushranger
- T. E. B. Clarke (Thomas Ernest Bennett Clarke, 1907–1989), film screenwriter

== Characters ==
- Tom Clarke (Taken), a fictional character in the TV series Taken played by Ryan Hurst
- Thomas Clarke, character in Wizards vs Aliens

== See also ==
- Thomas Clark (disambiguation)
- Tom Clark (disambiguation)
- Thomas Clerk (disambiguation)
- Thomas Clerke (disambiguation)
