= 1939–40 Port Vale F.C. season =

Port Vale F.C.
1939–40 season
- Chairman: Frank Huntbach
- Stadium: Old Recreation Ground
- Football League Third Division South: 22nd (1 point) – season abandoned
- Football League West League: 8th (22 points)
- Football League War Cup: Preliminary Round (eliminated by Walsall)
- Staffordshire Senior Cup: First Round (eliminated by West Bromwich Albion)
- Top goalscorer: League: Jack Roberts (13); All: Jack Roberts (14)
- Highest home attendance: 6,000 vs. Everton, 6 April 1940
- Lowest home attendance: 1,000 vs. New Brighton, 13 May 1940
- Average home league attendance: 2,568
- Biggest win: 6–1 vs. Crewe Alexandra, 21 October 1939
- Biggest defeat: 0–7 and 1–8
Home colours

The 1939–40 season was Port Vale's 34th season of football in the Football League, and second-successive season in the Third Division South. After just two league matches — both victories — the outbreak of World War II on 1 September 1939 led to the immediate suspension and eventual cancellation of all competitive league football. These opening fixtures were expunged from the official records, ending any formal pursuit of promotion or league progression that year.

With the abandonment of the official competition, Vale turned to regional wartime football, competing in the Football League West Regional League, where they finished 8th with 22 points. A 0–7 defeat and a 1–8 loss formed the season's heaviest reversals, while more encouraging results — such as competitive home performances—offered sporadic morale boosts in a difficult season context. Vale were also knocked out early in the Football League War Cup, exiting in the preliminary round following a defeat to Walsall. Though informal, the season served as a makeshift continuation for fans amid global upheaval.

Jack Roberts emerged as the club's leading scorer, netting 13 league goals and 14 in all competitions across the wartime programme. He remained a key focal point in Vale’s working side, displaying consistent goal-scoring form despite the unsettled nature of the competition structure. Attendances were much reduced due to wartime restrictions: the highest gate of approximately 6,000 came against Everton on 6 April 1940, while the lowest dipped to around 1,000 for a visit by New Brighton on 13 May. The average attendance settled at just 2,568, reflecting the broader limitations of the period.

Off the pitch, Port Vale faced severe financial and personnel strain. Most first-team players were unavailable, having joined the war effort, and the club struggled to field a competitive professional side. As a result, Vale often relied on youth and reserve players while managing across multiple local competitions. By the summer of 1940, financial pressures had escalated, with the club selling its Old Recreation Ground to the city council and operating in a precarious position for the duration of the war.

== Overview ==
Having rebuilt the playing squad the previous season, the Port Vale management opted to supplement the relatively team with young signings; notable teenage arrivals were Scottish winger Murdoch Dickie from Crewe Alexandra and inside-forward Bert Flatley from York City. Ken Fish returned as an assistant trainer as well as a player, with the club deciding to do without a manager in favour of a selection committee. The squad consisted of 22 professionals, though both Roy Felton and Roger Whittle were absent on military training, as the club decided to save money by asking squad players to be versatile in their playing positions. A goalless draw on the opening day down at Brighton & Hove Albion was followed by a 1–0 home defeat to Exeter City. Still, match number three against Northampton Town was cancelled after war was declared and the government prohibited all sports gatherings. The Football League was formally cancelled, and the footballing authorities looked at alternative arrangements. Permission was granted for football to take place in Stoke-on-Trent and friendlies took place as during this time.

The Football League eventually decided upon regional leagues and placed Vale in the West Region, alongside the big clubs from Liverpool and Manchester. Attendances were low, with only the fixtures with Manchester United and Everton breaking the 4,000 mark at the Old Recreation Ground. They managed to beat Everton 2–1 in front on a season-high crowd of around 6,000, and also managed to pick up a 1–1 draw with Liverpool in front of just 4,000 spectators at Anfield. Vale suffered heavy defeats at Old Trafford, the Victoria Ground and Maine Road, as well as at home to Liverpool, but managed to record doubles against both Crewe Alexandra and Tranmere Rovers. Despite fielding strong sides in the War Cup and Staffordshire Senior Cup they were eliminated in the opening rounds by Walsall and West Bromwich Albion respectively. Jack Roberts finished as top-scorer with 14 goals in all competitions. The club could not afford to continue fielding a professional team and so fielded just a junior side until the 1944–45 season despite still losing vast sums of money maintaining the Old Recreation Ground.

== Results ==
=== Football League Third Division South ===
Round	1	2
Ground	A	H
Result	D	L
Position	12	22
Points	1	1

Source: Statto
A = Away; H = Home; W = Win; D = Draw; L = Loss

==== League table ====
Pos	Team	Pld	W	D	L	GF	GA	GAv	Pts	Qualification
18	Northampton Town	3	1	0	2	2	12	0.167	2	
19	Aldershot	3	0	1	2	3	5	0.600	1	
20	Swindon Town	3	0	1	2	2	4	0.500	1	
21	Bristol Rovers	3	0	1	2	2	7	0.286	1	Reprived from re-election (Note: There was no promotion or re-election as the season was abandoned due to the outbreak of World War II.)
22	Port Vale	2	0	1	1	0	1	0.000	1	Reprived from re-election

Notes:
- Note: The Football League was cancelled after three matches.

==== Results by matchday ====
26 August 1939 1	Brighton & Hove Albion	0–0	Port Vale	Hove
				Stadium: Goldstone Ground; Attendance: 8,172

2 September 1939 2	Port Vale	0–1	Exeter City	Hanley
		Report	Riley 40'	Stadium: Old Recreation Ground; Attendance: 5,102; Referee: E.L. Davies

=== Football League West (War) League ===
==== League table ====
Pos	Team	Pld	W	D	L	GF	GA	GR	Pts
1	Stoke City	22	13	5	4	57	41	1.390	31
2	Liverpool	22	12	5	5	66	40	1.650	29
3	Everton	22	12	4	6	64	33	1.939	28
4	Manchester United	22	14	0	8	74	41	1.805	28
5	Manchester City	22	12	4	6	73	41	1.780	28
6	Wrexham	22	10	5	7	45	50	0.900	25
7	New Brighton	22	10	3	9	55	52	1.058	23
8	Port Vale	22	10	2	10	52	56	0.929	22
9	Chester	22	7	5	10	40	51	0.784	19
10	Crewe Alexandra	22	6	1	15	44	79	0.557	13
11	Stockport County	22	4	3	15	45	79	0.570	11
12	Tranmere Rovers	22	2	3	17	41	93	0.441	7

==== Results by matchday ====
21 October 1939 1	Port Vale	6–1	Crewe Alexandra	Hanley
	P.Griffiths; Tunnicliffe; Nolan; Roberts			Stadium: Old Recreation Ground; Attendance: 2,100

28 October 1939 2	Liverpool	1–1	Port Vale	Anfield
	Balmer 15'	Report	Nolan	Stadium: Anfield; Attendance: 4,000

11 November 1939 3	Stockport County	2–1	Port Vale	Stockport
			P.Griffiths	Stadium: Edgeley Park; Attendance: 3,452

18 November 1939 4	Port Vale	6–2	Tranmere Rovers	Hanley
	H.Griffiths (pen.) (pen.); P.Griffiths; Tunnicliffe; Nolan			Stadium: Old Recreation Ground; Attendance: 1,745

25 November 1939 5	Manchester United	8–1	Port Vale	Old Trafford
	Wrigglesworth; Asquith; Pearson; Smith		Tunnicliffe	Stadium: Old Trafford; Attendance: 1,500

2 December 1939 6	Port Vale	1–0	Wrexham	Hanley
14:30 GMT	Higgins 81'	Report		Stadium: Old Recreation Ground; Attendance: 1,456; Referee: F. Lee

9 December 1939 7	Everton	3–1	Port Vale	Walton, Liverpool
			P.Griffiths	Stadium: Goodison Park; Attendance: 1,000

6 January 1940 8	New Brighton	2–2	Port Vale	New Brighton, Merseyside
			Tunnicliffe; P.Griffiths	Stadium: Sandheys Park; Attendance: 1,500

10 February 1940 9	Crewe Alexandra	1–3	Port Vale	Crewe
			Roberts; Cumberlidge	Stadium: Gresty Road; Attendance: 800

24 February 1940 10	Port Vale	3–8	Liverpool	Hanley
	Sproson; Roberts; P.Griffiths	Report	Fagan (pen.); Liddell; Tennant; Van Den Berg	Stadium: Old Recreation Ground; Attendance: 2,039

2 March 1940 11	Chester	0–3	Port Vale	Chester
			Higgins; Roberts; Tunnicliffe	Stadium: Sealand Road; Attendance: 1,000

9 March 1940 12	Port Vale	6–2	Stockport County	Hanley
	Higgins; Tunnicliffe; P.Griffiths; Roberts			Stadium: Old Recreation Ground; Attendance: 1,787

16 March 1940 13	Tranmere Rovers	1–5	Port Vale	Prenton
			Tunnicliffe; Roberts; Higgins	Stadium: Prenton Park; Attendance: 2,000

23 March 1940 14	Port Vale	1–3	Manchester United	Hanley
	Higgins		McKay; Pearson	Stadium: Old Recreation Ground; Attendance: 4,127

25 March 1940 15	Stoke City	5–1	Port Vale	Stoke-upon-Trent
	Ormston; Sale (og.)		Roberts	Stadium: Victoria Ground; Attendance: 9,450

30 March 1940 16	Wrexham	1–0	Port Vale	Wrexham
15:30 BST	Martin 60'	Report		Stadium: Racecourse Ground; Attendance: 2,000; Referee: C. Fletcher

6 April 1940 17	Port Vale	2–1	Everton	Hanley
	Griffiths; Higgins			Stadium: Old Recreation Ground; Attendance: 6,000

4 May 1940 18	Port Vale	3–1	Chester	Hanley
	Roberts; Blunt			Stadium: Old Recreation Ground; Attendance: 1,170

6 May 1940 19	Port Vale	1–2	Stoke City	Hanley
	Roberts		Steele; Sale	Stadium: Old Recreation Ground; Attendance: 3,053

11 May 1940 20	Port Vale	2–5	Manchester City	Hanley
	Roberts; Bellis			Stadium: Old Recreation Ground; Attendance: 1,242

13 May 1940 21	Port Vale	3–0	New Brighton	Hanley
	Triner; Bellis			Stadium: Old Recreation Ground; Attendance: 1,000

18 May 1940 22	Manchester City	7–0	Port Vale	Manchester
				Stadium: Maine Road; Attendance: 2,000

=== Football League (War) Cup ===
13 April 1940 Preliminary	Port Vale	2–2	Walsall	Hanley
	H.Griffiths; Roberts			Stadium: Old Recreation Ground; Attendance: 4,403

15 April 1940 Replay	Walsall	6–0	Port Vale	Walsall
				Stadium: Fellows Park; Attendance: 883

=== Staffordshire Senior Cup ===
4 November 1939 1R	West Bromwich Albion	2–1	Port Vale	West Bromwich
			P.Griffiths	Stadium: The Hawthorns; Attendance: 2,000

== Squad statistics ==
=== Appearances and goals ===
Key to positions: GK – Goalkeeper; FB – Full back; HB – Half back; FW – Forward

No.	Pos	Nat	Player	Total		Third Division South		War League		Cups	
No.	Pos	Nat	Player	Apps	Goals	Apps	Goals	Apps	Goals	Apps	Goals
	GK	(England) ENG	Arthur Jepson	26	0	2	0	21	0	3	0
	GK	(England) ENG	Jack Moore	1	0	0	0	1	0	0	0
	FB	(England) ENG	Jack Griffiths	1	0	0	0	1	0	0	0
	FB	(England) ENG	Jimmy Oakes	7	0	0	0	7	0	0	0
	FB	(Scotland) SCO	Bob Pursell	15	0	0	0	13	0	2	0
	FB	(England) ENG	Johnny Rowe	20	0	2	0	15	0	3	0
	FB	(England) ENG	Charlie Scrimshaw	8	0	0	0	7	0	1	0
	HB	(England) ENG	Edwin Blunt	10	1	0	0	9	1	1	0
	HB	(England) ENG	Harry Griffiths	20	3	2	0	16	3	2	0
	HB	(England) ENG	George Hannah	5	0	2	0	3	0	0	0
	HB	(England) ENG	Fred Obrey	10	0	0	0	10	0	0	0
	HB	(England) ENG	Wilf Smith	27	0	2	0	22	0	3	0
	FW	(England) ENG	Alf Bellis	7	2	2	0	5	2	0	0
	FW	(England) ENG	Ronald Beresford	1	0	0	0	0	0	1	0
	FW	(England) ENG	Arthur Cumberlidge	19	1	2	0	15	1	2	0
	FW	(South Africa) RSA	Ken Fish	0	0	0	0	0	0	0	0
	FW	(England) ENG	Bert Flatley	2	0	2	0	0	0	0	0
	FW	(Wales) WAL	Phil Griffiths	25	10	0	0	22	9	3	1
	FW	(England) ENG	Dennis Higgins	21	7	0	0	18	7	3	0
	FW	(England) ENG	George Morrey	1	0	0	0	1	0	0	0
	FW	(England) ENG	Jack Roberts	20	14	2	0	16	13	2	1
	FW	(England) ENG	John Sanderson	2	0	2	0	0	0	0	0
	FW	(England) ENG	Jess Sproson	4	1	0	0	4	1	0	0
	FW	(England) ENG	Don Triner	5	2	0	0	5	2	0	0
	FW	(England) ENG	Billy Tunnicliffe	20	10	0	0	17	10	3	0
	FW	(England) ENG	Harry Ware	8	0	0	0	6	0	2	0
Players who featured but departed the club during the season:
	FW	(Scotland) SCO	Murdoch Dickie	2	0	2	0	0	0	0	0
	FW	(England) ENG	Tom Nolan	9	3	0	0	8	3	1	0

=== Top scorers ===
Place	Position	Nation	Name	West (War) League	War Cup	Staffs Cup	Total
1	FW	England	Jack Roberts	13	1	0	14
2	FW	England	Billy Tunnicliffe	10	0	0	10
–	FW	Wales	Phil Griffiths	9	0	1	10
4	FW	England	Dennis Higgins	7	0	0	7
5	FW	England	Harry Griffiths	3	1	0	4
6	FW	England	Tom Nolan	3	0	0	3
7	FW	England	Alf Bellis	2	0	0	2
–	FW	England	Don Triner	2	0	0	2
9	HB	England	Edwin Blunt	1	0	0	1
–	FW	England	Arthur Cumberlidge	1	0	0	1
–	DF	England	Jess Sproson	1	0	0	1
–	–	–	Own goals	0	0	0	0
			TOTALS	52	2	1	55

== Transfers ==
=== Transfers in ===
Date from	Position	Nationality	Name	From	Fee	Ref.
May 1939	FW	ENG	Murdoch Dickie	Crewe Alexandra	Free transfer	
June 1939	FW	ENG	Bert Flatley	York City	Free transfer	
July 1939	FW	RSA	Ken Fish	(Switzerland) Young Boys	Free transfer	
October 1939	FW	WAL	Phil Griffiths	Folkestone	Free transfer	

=== Transfers out ===
Date from	Position	Nationality	Name	To	Fee	Ref.
December 1939	FW	ENG	Murdoch Dickie		Contract cancelled	
February 1940	FW	ENG	Tom Nolan	Retired		
