= 1938–39 Port Vale F.C. season =

Port Vale F.C.
1938–39 season
- Chairman: Frank Huntbach
- Manager: Tom Morgan (until March)
- Stadium: Old Recreation Ground
- Football League Third Division South: 18th (37 points)
- FA Cup: Second Round (eliminated by Southend United)
- Football League Third Division South Cup: Semi-finals (tournament cancelled)
- Top goalscorer: League: Tom Nolan (17); All: Tom Nolan (17)
- Highest home attendance: 12,521 vs. Cardiff City, 5 November 1938
- Lowest home attendance: 3,482 vs. Clapton Orient, 6 May 1939
- Average home league attendance: 7,587
- Biggest win: 4–0 (twice) and 5–1
- Biggest defeat: 0–4 (twice) and 1–5
Home colours

The 1938–39 season was Port Vale's 33rd season of football in the English Football League, and their first ever season in the Third Division South, having switched from the Third Division North in summer 1938. Under manager Tom Nolan and chairman Frank Huntbach, Vale played their home games at the Old Recreation Ground. They finished 18th in the 22‑team league with 37 points from 14 wins, 9 draws, and 19 losses, scoring 52 goals and conceding 58—safely clear of the re‑election zone but well adrift of promotion.

Port Vale began the season by integrating several new signings – most notably goalkeeper Arthur Jepson, left-back George Collin, half-backs George Hannah and Sid Wileman, and winger John Callender – in an attempt to rebuild the starting lineup. Early results were poor, with three league defeats in the first four games, before a turnaround saw five straight home wins, including a 5–1 drubbing of Walsall and a 3–1 away victory over Exeter City. However, a winless run from November through to the New Year left them perilously close to the bottom.

Their cup campaigns brought mixed fortunes. In the FA Cup, Vale beat Wrexham in the First Round before being eliminated by Second Division Southend United at home in the Second Round. In the ill-fated Third Division South Cup, Vale reached the semi‑final—defeating Walsall, Mansfield Town, and Ipswich Town – before the tournament was cancelled and all results voided due to financial and attendance issues.

Forward Tom Nolan was the club's leading scorer, contributing 17 goals across all competitions amid a generally low-scoring campaign. Off the field, rising gate receipts by £659 were offset by a loss of £1,723 for the season, largely tied to costly transfers and the league switch. Despite spirited performances in the final matches – including a 2–0 win at champions Newport County – Vale finished in their lowest ever league position at the time, though they avoided re‑election by four points and set the groundwork for rebuilding heading into the war‑interrupted 1939–40 season.

Frank Huntbach was chairman for the last peacetime season of his career. The club's longest-serving chairman, he had been in charge from 1913 to 1921 and 1926 to 1940.

== Overview ==
=== Third Division South ===
Port Vale were switched to the Third Division South from the Third Division North. The pre-season saw another reconstruction of the first XI, as eleven new signings arrived at the Old Recreation Ground, most notably: highly rated goalkeeper Arthur Jepson (Grantham Town); veteran left-back George Collin (Sunderland); right-half George Hannah (Derby County); left-half Sid Wileman (signed from Derby for 'a substantial fee'); and goalscoring winger John Callender (Lincoln City). Work at the stadium took place, as ground outside the stadium was prepared for car parking. The eclectic training schedule of the previous season was expanded, with bowls and cricket supplemented by games of tennis and baseball. Also on 20 August, a Football League Jubilee Fund match was played against nearby Crewe Alexandra, with the Vale picking up a 3–2 win, raising £243 in the process.

The season began with George Heppell in goal, as Nottinghamshire County Cricket Club at first refused to allow Jepson to play. With three defeats in the first four games, most new men were dropped as Morgan struggled to find consistency in his picks. It took until the end of October for the team to get into their stride, as their 5–1 win over Walsall was their fifth consecutive home win. They also travelled to St James Park to record a 3–1 win over Exeter City – their first away win since September 1937. Nottinghamshire CCC seemed justified in initially refusing Jepson permission to play, as he played seventy minutes of the game with his right hand strapped up, having dislocated his fingers. Ken Fish was then sold to BSC Young Boys of Switzerland, having fallen out of favour. Yet, the directors refused to hear offers for the rest of the team, determined as they were to strengthen the team. Despite stylish play, especially from Alf Bellis, the club then went from Guy Fawkes Night to New Year's Eve without a victory, their five defeats taking them to just two points clear of the re-election zone. Ending their run with a 4–0 win over Bristol City, they lost Jack Roberts to a dislocated shoulder.

Trying out new, young players in 1939, the club re-signed veteran forward Tommy Ward from Stoke City. The team were in a rut and picked up just one point from seven games. A 4–0 hammering at Fellows Park from bottom-placed Walsall left Vale third-from-bottom by March. Disgruntled supporters turned against the team, as regular barracking was directed at the players. Roberts and Jepson struggled with injuries, but by March, the newcomers had finally gelled as a group, and results soon picked up. Yet manager Tom Morgan shocked the club by leaving for the vacant position at Wrexham, leaving the club somewhat rudderless. Despite receiving a 4–0 beating from Notts County at Meadow Lane, the players rallied to produce four points from their last three games. Two of these points came from a 2–0 win over champions Newport County at Somerton Park, making Vale the only team to have recorded the double over "Ironsides" that season.

They finished in 18th place with 37 points, then a club record low position. They were four points clear of having to petition for re-election, and 18 points short of promotion. Their 52 goals scored was a poor record, though a total of 58 goals conceded was much improved on the previous campaign. Nolan's 17 goals were the only major contribution in front of goal.

=== Finances ===
On the financial side, gate receipts had increased by £659. However, an overall loss was made of £1,723. The move to the southern division had cost a considerable amount in transfer fees, though home game income had improved by £676 to £6,403. Further financial worries were lessened by a transfer credit of £1,455. Despite the poor season, 17 players were kept on, though promising teenage midfielder John Smith was sold to Chelsea. Other departures included Harry Davies (retired); Leonard Smart; Tommy Ward (Mansfield Town); Arthur Caldwell; Arthur Masters; George Collin (Burton Town); Sid Wileman (Hinckley United); and John Callender (Gateshead).

=== Cup competitions ===
In the FA Cup, Vale overcame Wrexham of the Third Division North 2–1 at the Racecourse Ground. However, they crashed out at the second round, losing 1–0 at home to league rivals Southend United. For both matches the players had relaxed beforehand with activities such as golf, country walks, and games of snooker.

In the short-lived Football League Third Division South Cup, the "Valiants" progressed to the semi-finals at the expense of Walsall (4–0), Mansfield Town (3–1), and Ipswich Town (2–0). In the semis, they came to a goalless stalemate with Queens Park Rangers at Loftus Road – the tournament was cancelled at this stage, and so no club would win it. The club had lost money in the much-maligned tournament, as atrocious attendances were not enough even to pay player bonuses. Port Vale and Queens Park Rangers protested in favour of cancelling the tournament due to the financial failure of the cup, and the Football League agreed with them to 'wash out' the competition.

== Results ==
=== Football League Third Division South ===
==== League table ====
Pos	Team	Pld	W	D	L	GF	GA	GAv	Pts
16	Mansfield Town	42	12	15	15	44	62	0.710	39
17	Northampton Town	42	15	8	19	51	58	0.879	38
18	Port Vale	42	14	9	19	52	58	0.897	37
19	Torquay United	42	14	9	19	54	70	0.771	37
20	Clapton Orient	42	11	13	18	53	55	0.964	35

==== Results by matchday ====
Round	1	2	3	4	5	6	7	8	9	10	11	12	13	14	15	16	17	18	19	20	21	22	23	24	25	26	27	28	29	30	31	32	33	34	35	36	37	38	39	40	41	42
Ground	H	H	A	A	H	A	H	H	A	A	H	A	H	A	H	H	H	A	H	H	A	A	H	A	A	H	H	A	H	A	A	H	A	H	H	A	A	H	A	A	A	H
Result	L	W	L	L	W	L	W	W	L	D	W	W	D	L	L	D	D	L	L	W	W	L	L	L	D	L	L	L	W	W	D	D	L	W	W	L	L	W	L	D	W	D
Position	18	10	16	18	16	20	14	14	16	15	11	9	8	9	10	13	14	16	16	14	12	14	15	18	18	18	19	21	19	19	19	19	19	19	17	19	19	19	19	19	19	18
Points	0	2	2	2	4	4	6	8	8	9	11	13	14	14	14	15	16	16	16	18	20	20	20	20	21	21	21	21	23	25	26	27	27	29	31	31	31	33	33	34	36	37

Source: Statto
A = Away; H = Home; W = Win; D = Draw; L = Loss

==== Matches ====
27 August 1938 1	Port Vale	1–3	Aldershot	Hanley
	Callender	Report		Stadium: Old Recreation Ground; Attendance: 10,036

29 August 1938 2	Port Vale	2–1	Newport County	Hanley
	O'Brien; Roberts	Report	Hickman	Stadium: Old Recreation Ground; Attendance: 6,240

3 September 1938 3	Bristol City	5–1	Port Vale	Ashton Gate, Bristol
		Report	Nolan	Stadium: Ashton Gate; Attendance: 16,975

8 September 1938 4	Clapton Orient	1–0	Port Vale	Leyton, East London
		Report		Stadium: Brisbane Road; Attendance: 4,399

10 September 1938 5	Port Vale	2–0	Crystal Palace	Hanley
	Nolan	Report		Stadium: Old Recreation Ground; Attendance: 10,478

17 September 1938 6	Watford	2–0	Port Vale	Watford
	Dunderdale; Wipfler	Report		Stadium: Vicarage Road; Attendance: 9,503

24 September 1938 7	Port Vale	3–0	Mansfield Town	Hanley
	Masters; Bellis	Report		Stadium: Old Recreation Ground; Attendance: 8,100

1 October 1938 8	Port Vale	2–0	Swindon Town	Hanley
	Griffiths; Roberts 80'	Report		Stadium: Old Recreation Ground; Attendance: 10,082; Referee: W.J. Lewington

8 October 1938 9	Torquay United	1–0	Port Vale	Torquay
		Report		Stadium: Plainmoor; Attendance: 3,382

15 October 1938 10	Queens Park Rangers	2–2	Port Vale	Shepherd's Bush, West London
		Report	Nolan; Roberts	Stadium: Loftus Road; Attendance: 13,853

22 October 1938 11	Port Vale	5–1	Walsall	Hanley
	Davies; Nolan; Roberts; Masters	Report		Stadium: Old Recreation Ground; Attendance: 8,593

29 October 1938 12	Exeter City	1–3	Port Vale	Exeter
		Report	Roberts; Bellis	Stadium: St James Park; Attendance: 6,885; Referee: G.T.Gould

5 November 1938 13	Port Vale	1–1	Cardiff City	Hanley
	Nolan	Report	Jimmy Collins	Stadium: Old Recreation Ground; Attendance: 12,521

12 November 1938 14	Ipswich Town	2–0	Port Vale	Ipswich
		Report		Stadium: Portman Road; Attendance: 13,637

19 November 1938 15	Port Vale	0–2	Reading	Hanley
		Report		Stadium: Old Recreation Ground; Attendance: 9,633

3 December 1938 16	Port Vale	1–1	Brighton & Hove Albion	Hanley
	Nolan	Report		Stadium: Old Recreation Ground; Attendance: 8,015

17 December 1938 17	Port Vale	2–2	Southend United	Hanley
	Masters; Roberts	Report		Stadium: Old Recreation Ground; Attendance: 4,209

26 December 1938 18	Northampton Town	2–0	Port Vale	Northampton
		Report		Stadium: County Cricket Ground; Attendance: 4,734

27 December 1938 19	Port Vale	0–2	Northampton Town	Hanley
		Report		Stadium: Old Recreation Ground; Attendance: 10,717

31 December 1938 20	Port Vale	4–0	Bristol City	Hanley
	Nolan; Griffiths; Roberts	Report		Stadium: Old Recreation Ground; Attendance: 4,597

7 January 1939 21	Bristol Rovers	0–1	Port Vale	Bristol
		Report	Nolan	Stadium: Eastville Stadium; Attendance: 3,962

14 January 1939 22	Crystal Palace	1–0	Port Vale	Selhurst, Croydon
		Report		Stadium: Selhurst Park; Attendance: 13,773

21 January 1939 23	Port Vale	1–2	Watford	Hanley
	Nolan	Report	Dunderdale	Stadium: Old Recreation Ground; Attendance: 5,204

28 January 1939 24	Mansfield Town	2–0	Port Vale	Mansfield
	Carter; Bungay	Report		Stadium: Field Mill; Attendance: 3,742

4 February 1939 25	Swindon Town	1–1	Port Vale	Swindon
	Wilcockson 90'	Report	Ward 12'	Stadium: County Ground; Attendance: 8,823; Referee: W.J. Lewington

11 February 1939 26	Port Vale	0–1	Torquay United	Hanley
		Report		Stadium: Old Recreation Ground; Attendance: 8,064

18 February 1939 27	Port Vale	1–2	Queens Park Rangers	Hanley
	Ward	Report		Stadium: Old Recreation Ground; Attendance: 7,210

25 February 1939 28	Walsall	4–0	Port Vale	Walsall
		Report		Stadium: Fellows Park; Attendance: 5,749

4 March 1939 29	Port Vale	3–2	Exeter City	Hanley
	Nolan; Moreland; Masters	Report		Stadium: Old Recreation Ground; Attendance: 6,240; Referee: W. Martin

11 March 1939 30	Cardiff City	2–4	Port Vale	Cardiff
	Harry Egan; Les Talbot	Report	Smart; Ward; Nolan	Stadium: Ninian Park; Attendance: 9,145

15 March 1939 31	Bournemouth & Boscombe Athletic	1–1	Port Vale	Bournemouth
		Report	Ward	Stadium: Dean Court; Attendance: 3,243

18 March 1939 32	Port Vale	0–0	Ipswich Town	Hanley
		Report		Stadium: Old Recreation Ground; Attendance: 6,361

25 March 1939 33	Reading	2–1	Port Vale	Reading, Berkshire
		Report	Moreland	Stadium: Elm Park; Attendance: 5,079

1 April 1939 34	Port Vale	2–1	Bristol Rovers	Hanley
	Nolan; Smart	Report		Stadium: Old Recreation Ground; Attendance: 5,634

7 April 1939 35	Port Vale	3–1	Notts County	Hanley
	Smart (og.); Nolan	Report		Stadium: Old Recreation Ground; Attendance: 9,658

8 April 1939 36	Brighton & Hove Albion	1–0	Port Vale	Hove
		Report		Stadium: Goldstone Ground; Attendance: 7,807

10 April 1939 37	Notts County	4–0	Port Vale	Nottingham
		Report		Stadium: Meadow Lane; Attendance: 10,401

15 April 1939 38	Port Vale	2–0	Bournemouth & Boscombe Athletic	Hanley
	Nolan; Moreland	Report		Stadium: Old Recreation Ground; Attendance: 3,902

19 April 1939 39	Aldershot	1–0	Port Vale	Aldershot
		Report		Stadium: Recreation Ground; Attendance: 3,518

22 April 1939 40	Southend United	0–0	Port Vale	Southend-on-Sea
		Report		Stadium: Southend Stadium; Attendance: 4,239

29 April 1939 41	Newport County	0–2	Port Vale	Newport, Wales
		Report	Smart; Bellis	Stadium: Somerton Park; Attendance: 7,260

6 May 1939 42	Port Vale	1–1	Clapton Orient	Hanley
	Nolan	Report		Stadium: Old Recreation Ground; Attendance: 3,482

=== FA Cup ===
26 November 1938 R1	Wrexham	1–2	Port Vale	Wrexham
14:15 GMT	Burditt 43'	Report	Roberts 15', 74'	Stadium: Racecourse Ground; Attendance: 5,000; Referee: W. Heskine

10 December 1938 R2	Port Vale	0–1	Southend United	Hanley
		Report		Stadium: Old Recreation Ground; Attendance: 7,993

=== Third Division South Cup ===
26 September 1938 R1	Port Vale	4–0	Walsall	Hanley
	Smith; Masters; Griffiths; Davies			Stadium: Old Recreation Ground

13 February 1939 R2	Port Vale	3–1	Mansfield Town	Hanley
	Ward; Smith			Stadium: Old Recreation Ground

27 February 1939 R3	Port Vale	2–0	Ipswich Town	Hanley
	Ward; Masters			Stadium: Old Recreation Ground

4 May 1939 Semi-final	Queens Park Rangers	0–0	Port Vale	Shepherd's Bush, West London
				Stadium: Loftus Road; Attendance: 300

== Squad statistics ==
=== Appearances and goals ===
Key to positions: GK – Goalkeeper; FB – Full back; HB – Half back; FW – Forward

No.	Pos	Nat	Player	Total		Third Division South		FA Cup		Third Division South Cup	
No.	Pos	Nat	Player	Apps	Goals	Apps	Goals	Apps	Goals	Apps	Goals
	GK	(England) ENG	George Heppell	3	0	3	0	0	0	0	0
	GK	(England) ENG	Arthur Jepson	45	0	39	0	2	0	4	0
	FB	(England) ENG	Tom Clark	0	0	0	0	0	0	0	0
	FB	(England) ENG	Roy Felton	12	0	10	0	0	0	2	0
	FB	(England) ENG	Johnny Rowe	40	0	35	0	2	0	3	0
	FB	(England) ENG	Roger Whittle	4	0	4	0	0	0	0	0
	HB	(England) ENG	Bill Booth	10	0	9	0	0	0	1	0
	HB	(England) ENG	Harry Griffiths	37	3	33	2	2	0	2	1
	HB	(England) ENG	George Hannah	48	0	42	0	2	0	4	0
	HB	(England) ENG	Wilf Smith	40	0	37	0	2	0	1	0
	HB	(England) ENG	Tommy Ward	15	7	12	4	0	0	3	3
	HB	(England) ENG	Sid Wileman	6	0	4	0	1	0	1	0
	FW	(England) ENG	Alf Bellis	31	3	26	3	2	0	3	0
	FW	(England) ENG	Arthur Caldwell	6	0	4	0	0	0	2	0
	FW	(England) ENG	Arthur Cumberlidge	41	0	35	0	2	0	4	0
	FW	(England) ENG	Arthur Masters	37	7	33	5	2	0	2	2
	FW	(England) ENG	Geoffrey Moreland	9	3	7	3	0	0	2	0
	FW	(England) ENG	Tom Nolan	41	17	39	17	2	0	0	0
	FW	(England) ENG	Jack Roberts	21	10	20	8	1	2	0	0
	FW	(England) ENG	John Sanderson	1	0	1	0	0	0	0	0
	FW	(England) ENG	Leonard Smart	13	5	13	5	0	0	0	0
	FW	(England) ENG	John Smith	17	2	13	0	1	0	3	2
	FW	(England) ENG	Don Triner	4	0	3	0	0	0	1	0
	FW	(England) ENG	Joe Wheatley	3	0	2	0	0	0	1	0
Players who featured but departed the club during the season:
	FB	(England) ENG	George Collin	1	0	1	0	0	0	0	0
	FW	(England) ENG	John Callender	4	1	3	1	0	0	1	0
	FW	(England) ENG	Harry Davies	34	3	29	2	1	0	4	1
	FW	(South Africa) RSA	Ken Fish	0	0	0	0	0	0	0	0
	FW	(England) ENG	Richard Fuller	1	0	1	0	0	0	0	0
	FW	(Scotland) SCO	William O'Brien	4	1	4	1	0	0	0	0

=== Top scorers ===
Place	Position	Nation	Name	Third Division North	FA Cup	Southern Cup	Total
1	FW	England	Tom Nolan	17	0	0	17
2	FW	England	Jack Roberts	8	2	0	10
3	FW	England	Arthur Masters	5	0	2	7
–	HB	England	Tommy Ward	4	0	3	7
5	FW	England	Leonard Smart	5	0	0	5
6	FW	England	Geoffrey Moreland	3	0	0	3
–	FW	England	Alf Bellis	3	0	0	3
–	FW	England	Harry Davies	2	0	1	3
–	HB	England	Harry Griffiths	2	0	1	3
10	FW	England	John Smith	0	0	2	2
11	FW	England	John Callender	1	0	0	1
–	FW	Scotland	William O'Brien	1	0	0	1
–	–	–	Own goals	1	0	0	1
			TOTALS	52	2	9	61

== Transfers ==
=== Transfers in ===
Date from	Position	Nationality	Name	From	Fee	Ref.
May 1938	FW	ENG	John Callender	Lincoln City	Free transfer	
May 1938	FW	ENG	Richard Fuller	Stockport County	Free transfer	
May 1938	FW	SCO	William O'Brien	Bournemouth & Boscombe Athletic	Free transfer	
June 1938	FB	ENG	George Collin	Sunderland	Free transfer	
June 1938	FB	ENG	Roy Felton	Everton	Free transfer	
June 1938	HB	ENG	George Hannah	Derby County	Free transfer	
June 1938	GK	ENG	Arthur Jepson	Grantham Town	Free transfer	
June 1938	FW	ENG	John Sanderson	Newcastle United	Free transfer	
June 1938	HB	ENG	Sid Wileman	Derby County	'Substantial'	
November 1938	FW	ENG	Geoffrey Moreland	Birmingham	Free transfer	
December 1938	FW	ENG	Don Triner	Downing's Tileries	Free transfer	
February 1939	HB	ENG	Bill Booth	Wolverhampton Wanderers	Free transfer	
February 1939	HB	ENG	Tommy Ward	Stoke City	Free transfer	
March 1939	FW		Leonard Smart	Wolverhampton Wanderers	Free transfer	

=== Transfers out ===
Date from	Position	Nationality	Name	To	Fee	Ref.
October 1938	FW	RSA	Ken Fish	(Switzerland) Young Boys	Free transfer	
April 1939	FW	ENG	John Callender	Gateshead	Free transfer	
April 1939	FB	ENG	George Collin	Burton Town	Free transfer	
April 1939	FW	ENG	Harry Davies	Retired		
April 1939	FW	ENG	Richard Fuller	Darlington	Free transfer	
April 1939	FW	SCO	William O'Brien	Watford	Free transfer	
May 1939	FW	ENG	John Smith	Chelsea	Free transfer	
June 1939	HB	ENG	Tommy Ward	Mansfield Town	Free transfer	
August 1938	HB	ENG	Sid Wileman	Hinckley United	Free transfer	
Summer 1939	HB	ENG	Bill Booth	Cardiff City	Free transfer	
Summer 1939	FW	ENG	Arthur Masters		Released	
