= Richard Fuller =

Richard or Dickie Fuller may refer to:

- Richard Fuller (politician, died 1782), MP for Steyning 1764–68, Stockbridge 1768–74
- Richard Fuller (Conservative politician) (born 1962), British Conservative Member of Parliament for Bedford from 2010 to 2017 and North East Bedfordshire from 2019
- Richard Fuller (footballer) (1913–1983), English footballer
- Richard Fuller (environmentalist) (born 1960), founder, Blacksmith Institute
- Richard Fuller (pianist) (born 1947), American classical pianist
- Richard Fuller (minister) (1804–1876), founder of the Southern Baptist movement
- Richard Buckminster Fuller, American engineer, author and designer
- Richard Fuller, founder of the Seattle Art Museum

== See also ==
- Dickie Fuller (1913–1987), West Indian cricketer
