= Arthur Moreland =

Arthur Moreland may refer to:

- Arthur Moreland (artist) (1867–1951), British humorous artist
- Arthur Geoffrey Moreland (1914–1996), English footballer
