= Tom Clark =

Tom Clark may refer to:

== Sportspeople ==
- Tom Clark (cricketer, born 1924) (1924–1981), English cricketer for Surrey
- Tom Clark (cricketer, born 2001), English cricketer for Sussex
- Tom Clark (footballer) (fl. 1938–1946), English footballer
- Tom Clark (American football), American college football coach
- Tom Clark (sports executive) (born 1969), commissioner of the Professional Bowlers Association

== Others ==
- Tom C. Clark (1899–1977), U.S. Supreme Court justice
- Tom Clark (industrialist) (1916–2005), New Zealand industrialist and yachting supporter
- Tom Clark (journalist) (born 1952/53), Canadian journalist
- Tom Clark (poet) (1941–2018), American poet
- Tom Clark (politician), West Virginia politician
- Tom Clark, a member of the Yogscast

== See also ==
- Tommy Clark, a character in Heroes Reborn
- Tom Clarke (disambiguation)
- Thomas Clark (disambiguation)
