= Thomas Clark =

Thomas Clark may refer to:

== Authors and academicians ==
- Thomas D. Clark (1903–2005), Kentucky historian
- Thomas Arkle Clark (1862–1932), American academic
- Thomas Clark (writer) (born 1980), Scottish writer
- Thomas Fife Clark (1907–1985), British journalist and civil servant

== Business, commerce, and public service ==
- Thomas Clark (Upper Canada) (died 1835), Canadian businessman and political figure
- Sir Thomas Clark, 1st Baronet (1823–1900), lord provost of Edinburgh 1865–1888
- Thomas Clark (Long Beach) (1926–2020), mayor of Long Beach, California, 1975–1980, and 1982–1984
- Thomas Alonzo Clark (1920–2005), U.S. federal judge
- Tom C. Clark (1899–1977), U.S. attorney general and associate Supreme Court justice

== Performing arts, and fine arts ==
- Thomas Clark (composer) (1775–1859), composer of West Gallery music
- Thomas Brown Clark (1895–1983), Scottish painter
- Thomas Clark (actor), English stage actor

== Scientific disciplines and inventors ==
- T. H. Clark (1893–1996), American/Canadian geologist
- Thomas Clark (chemist) (1801–1867), British chemist
- Thomas J. Clark (1869–1907), American inventor

== Sports ==
- Thomas Clark (cricketer), eighteenth-century cricketer
- Thomas Clark (rower) (1906–1990), American Olympic rower

== Other people ==
- Thomas Clark (1599–1697), Early English immigrant to Plymouth Colony
- Thomas M. Clark (1812–1903), American Episcopal presiding bishop
- Thomas Clark (North Carolina soldier) (1741–1792), American officer of the American Revolutionary War
- Thomas Clark (Sussex Delaware) (1755-1819) Revolutionary War foot soldier (classified 'mulatto')
- Thomas Welsby Clark (1920–1941), sailor in the Royal Australian Navy

== See also ==
- Tom Clark (disambiguation)
- Thomas Clarke (disambiguation)
- Thomas Clerk (disambiguation)
- Thomas Clerke (disambiguation)
