= Leonard Smart =

English footballer

Personal information
- Position: Left winger

Youth career
- Folkestone Town

Senior career*
Years	Team	Apps	(Gls)
1938–1939	Wolverhampton Wanderers	0	(0)
1939	Port Vale	13	(5)
1946	Bournemouth & Boscombe Athletic	0	(0)
Total		0	(0)
- * Club domestic league appearances and goals

Leonard Smart was a footballer who played for Folkestone Town, Wolverhampton Wanderers, Port Vale, and Bournemouth & Boscombe Athletic.

== Career ==
Smart played for Folkestone Town and Wolverhampton Wanderers before joining Port Vale in March 1939. He only spent two months at the Old Recreation Ground and scored five goals in 13 Third Division South appearances. His first two goals for the "Valiants" came in a 4–2 win over Cardiff City at Ninian Park on 11 March, and he also bagged goals against Bristol Rovers, Notts County, and Newport County. He later played for Bournemouth & Boscombe Athletic.

== Career statistics ==
Appearances and goals by club, season and competition
Club	Season	League			FA Cup		Total	
Club	Season	Division	Apps	Goals	Apps	Goals	Apps	Goals
Wolverhampton Wanderers	1937–38	First Division	0	0	0	0	0	0
Port Vale	1938–39	Third Division South	13	5	0	0	13	5
Bournemouth & Boscombe Athletic	1945–46		0	0	1	0	1	0
Career total			13	5	1	0	14	5
