= Arthur Cumberlidge =

English footballer and manager

Personal information
- Full name: Arthur Leonard Cumberlidge
- Date of birth: 5 April 1914
- Place of birth: Wolstanton, England
- Date of death: 20 April 1983 (aged 69)
- Place of death: Middlewich, England
- Height: 5 ft 9 in (1.75 m)
- Position: Inside forward

Youth career
- Stoke City

Senior career*
Years	Team	Apps	(Gls)
1937–1946	Port Vale	66	(0)
- Northwich Victoria

Managerial career
- 1968: Northwich Victoria
- * Club domestic league appearances and goals

Arthur Leonard Cumberlidge (5 April 1914 – 20 April 1983) was an English footballer who played at inside-forward for Port Vale and coached Northwich Victoria.

== Career ==
Cumberlidge played for Stoke City before joining Port Vale as an amateur in October 1936. He made his debut in February 1937, and signed professional forms the following month. He made eight Third Division North appearances in the 1936–37 season, and played 23 league games in the 1937–38 season. He featured 35 times in the Third Division South in the 1938–39 campaign. He converted to left-half for the 1939–40 season, having previously been used as a left-back and inside-forward. After the conclusion of World War II, he was out of favour. He barely played before he was transferred to Northwich Victoria. He managed the "Vics" in the Cheshire County League in 1968.

== Career statistics ==
Appearances and goals by club, season and competition
Club	Season	League			FA Cup		Other		Total	
Club	Season	Division	Apps	Goals	Apps	Goals	Apps	Goals	Apps	Goals
Port Vale	1936–37	Third Division North	8	0	0	0	1	0	9	0
Port Vale	1937–38	Third Division North	23	0	1	0	2	0	26	0
Port Vale	1938–39	Third Division South	35	0	2	0	4	0	41	0
Port Vale	1939–40		0	0	0	0	2	0	2	0
Port Vale	Total		66	0	3	0	9	0	78	0
