= William O'Brien (footballer) =

Scottish footballer

Personal information
- Place of birth: Glasgow, Scotland
- Positions: Inside left; left-half

Youth career
- St. Anthony's

Senior career*
| Years | Team | Apps | (Gls) |
| 1936–1938 | Bournemouth & Boscombe Athletic | 16 | (5) |
| 1938–1939 | Port Vale | 4 | (1) |
| | Watford | 0 | (0) |
| Total | | 16 | (5) |
- * Club domestic league appearances and goals

William O'Brien was a Scottish footballer who played for Bournemouth & Boscombe Athletic, Port Vale, and Watford in the 1930s.

== Career ==
O'Brien played for Glasgow based St. Anthony's before heading to England to play for Bournemouth & Boscombe Athletic. He joined Port Vale in May 1938. He played a mere four Third Division South games for the "Valiants" in the 1938–39 season, scoring one goal in a 2–1 victory over Newport County at the Old Recreation Ground on 29 August. He left the club in April 1939, and later played for Watford.

== Career statistics ==
Appearances and goals by club, season and competition
| Club | Season | League | | | FA Cup | | Total | |
| Club | Season | Division | Apps | Goals | Apps | Goals | Apps | Goals |
|---|---|---|---|---|---|---|---|---|
| Bournemouth & Boscombe Athletic | 1936–37 | Third Division South | 1 | 0 | 0 | 0 | 1 | 0 |
| Bournemouth & Boscombe Athletic | 1937–38 | Third Division South | 15 | 5 | 0 | 0 | 15 | 5 |
| Bournemouth & Boscombe Athletic | Total | | 16 | 5 | 0 | 0 | 16 | 5 |
| Port Vale | 1938–39 | Third Division South | 4 | 1 | 0 | 0 | 4 | 1 |
| Career total | | | 20 | 6 | 0 | 0 | 20 | 6 |
