= Sid Wileman =

English footballer

Personal information
- Full name: Sidney Wileman
- Date of birth: 26 April 1910
- Place of birth: Coalville, England
- Date of death: 26 June 1985 (aged 75)
- Place of death: Coalville, England
- Position: Left-half

Youth career
- Hugglescote Wesleyans

Senior career*
Years	Team	Apps	(Gls)
- Gresley Rovers
1933–1938	Derby County	9	(1)
1938–1939	Port Vale	4	(0)
- Hinckley United
- * Club domestic league appearances and goals

Sidney Wileman (26 April 1910 – 26 June 1985) was an English footballer who played for Gresley Rovers, Derby County, Port Vale, and Hinckley United.

== Career ==
Wileman played for Hugglescote Wesleyans, Gresley Rovers, Nottingham Forest (on trial) and Derby County, before joining Port Vale for a "substantial fee" in June 1938. He made his debut at the Old Recreation Ground in a 3–1 defeat by Aldershot on 27 August and started the next two Third Division South games. However, he was only selected once more in the league that season, before being transferred to Hinckley United in August 1939.

== Career statistics ==
Appearances and goals by club, season and competition
Club	Season	League			FA Cup		Other		Total	
Club	Season	Division	Apps	Goals	Apps	Goals	Apps	Goals	Apps	Goals
Derby County	1933–34	First Division	6	1	2	0	0	0	8	1
Derby County	1934–35	First Division	2	0	0	0	0	0	2	0
Derby County	1935–36	First Division	0	0	0	0	0	0	0	0
Derby County	1936–37	First Division	1	0	0	0	0	0	1	0
Derby County	1937–38	First Division	0	0	0	0	0	0	0	0
Derby County	Total		9	1	2	0	0	0	11	1
Port Vale	1938–39	Third Division South	4	0	1	0	1	0	6	0
