= Thomas Clerk =

Thomas Clerk may refer to:

- Thomas Clerk (priest), English priest
- Thomas Clerk (MP for Midhurst), see Midhurst (UK Parliament constituency)
- Thomas Clerk (MP for Dunwich), see Dunwich (UK Parliament constituency)

== See also ==
- Thomas Clerke (disambiguation)
- Thomas Clark (disambiguation)
- Thomas Clarke (disambiguation)
