= 1937–38 Port Vale F.C. season =

Port Vale F.C.
1937–38 season
- Chairman: Frank Huntbach
- Manager: Tom Morgan (from December)
- Stadium: Old Recreation Ground
- Football League Third Division North: 15th (38 points)
- FA Cup: First Round (eliminated by Gainsborough Trinity)
- Football League Third Division North Cup: First Round (eliminated by Tranmere Rovers)
- Top goalscorer: League: Jack Roberts (28); All: Jack Roberts (30)
- Highest home attendance: 10,984 vs. Hull City, 15 April 1938
- Lowest home attendance: 2,992 vs. Rochdale, 30 April 1938
- Average home league attendance: 6,716
- Biggest win: 4–0 and 5–1
- Biggest defeat: 0–5 and 2–7
Home colours

The 1937–38 season was Port Vale's 32nd season of football in the English Football League, and their second-successive season (third overall) in the Third Division North. Under manager Tom Morgan, the club began life in the third tier at the Old Recreation Ground amid low expectations and modest attendances. Vale finished 15th in the 22-team division, earning 38 points from 12 wins, 14 draws, and 16 losses, with 65 goals scored and 73 conceded, leaving them six points clear of the re‑election zone and firmly mid‑table.

Early-season form was inconsistent. The campaign began with a 3–0 defeat at Oldham Athletic, but Vale then went on a six-game unbeaten run—highlighted by a 4–0 win over Barrow (with Jack Roberts scoring all four) and a 5–1 victory over Hartlepools United in which Arthur Caldwell notched a hat‑trick. However, heavy defeats—including a 5–0 loss to Bradford City and a 7–2 hammering at Chester—undermined positive runs and kept the side oscillating around the lower half of the table before a more stable second half rescued their league status.

In the FA Cup, Port Vale exited in the First Round after a replay loss to Gainsborough Trinity, ending hopes of a cup run to lift spirits. Their participation in the Third Division North Cup also ended at the first hurdle, with a replay defeat to Tranmere Rovers. These early exits denied Vale any memorable cup moments during a season already focused on league survival.

The standout individual contributions came from Jack Roberts, who led the scoring charts with 28 league goals, making him not just Vale's top scorer but the division's leading marksman. The season's modest financial gains—largely due to a £2,900 transfer credit—offset low matchday income. Despite ongoing boardroom debate about relocation, the club retained its base at the Old Recreation Ground for the time being. The 1937–38 campaign ultimately represented a season of adjustment and consolidation, laying the groundwork for Vale's efforts to rebuild in the lower tier.

Chairman Frank Huntbach

== Overview ==
=== Third Division North ===
The pre-season saw the arrival of goalkeepers James Nicholls and George Heppell (Brentford and Wolverhampton Wanderers); veteran right-back Johnny Rowe (Queen's Park Rangers); left-back Harry Johnson (Newcastle United); winger Charlie Rattray (Mansfield Town); experienced inside-right Arthur Masters (Nottingham Forest); and 'clever' inside-left William Price (Fulham). Pre-season training included bowls, cricket, and practice with rubbers balls and rubber boots to improve ball control. The fans were not optimistic about the campaign, so ticket sales were low despite lowered prices.

The season began with a 3–0 defeat at Oldham Athletic's Boundary Park. Tom Nolan found himself dropped in favour of Jack Roberts, who immediately went on a run of three goals in three games. On 13 September, Vale defeated league leaders New Brighton by three goals to two. This was followed by a 2–1 win at Crewe Alexandra, which proved to be the only win on the road all season. The team went on to go six games unbeaten, including a 4–0 win over Barrow in which Roberts scored all four. Their 5–1 win over Hartlepools United – in which Arthur Caldwell scored a hat-trick – took them into seventh in the table. This run ended with a 5–0 drubbing at Valley Parade. After this defeat to Bradford City the Vale signed forward Ken Fish from Aston Villa for 'a sizeable fee'. In November, William Price was released from his contract. The next month the side were on the end of a 7–2 beating by Chester at Sealand Road. Soon after this Tom Morgan was re-appointed as manager, having been demoted to assistant-secretary in June 1932. Morgan made six changes for his first game in charge, a 1–1 draw at Rochdale on 18 December. Following this, the club went on a run of one defeat in nine games. During this run, Roberts scored a hat-trick past Accrington Stanley in a 4–1 win to make himself the division's joint top-scorer.

On 29 January, Vale drew 1–1 with Crewe Alexandra, though Arthur Masters had no recollection of the match after twice being knocked unconscious. In February, Tommy Ward was traded to Stoke City in exchange for Harry Davies and a small fee. They suffered a 2–1 defeat at bottom club Hartlepools United on 19 February. On 5 March, Vale inflicted a 4–3 win over Bradford City, soon after which Sam Baum was signed from Bolton Wanderers just two minutes before the transfer deadline closed. On 19 March, Vale beat the league leaders Tranmere Rovers by a goal to nil. The players were rewarded with a trip to the 1938 Grand National. On 15 April, the club saw its first five-figure crowd of the season, as promotion-chasing Hull City took away both the points despite a brace from Roberts. Revenge came at Anlaby Road three days later, when the "Valiants" held a clean sheet to damage the "Tigers" promotion prospects. On the final home game of the season a 17-year-old Alf Bellis scored on his debut as Vale beat Rochdale 4–1.

They finished 15th with 38 points, just six points clear of the re-election zone. Away from the Old Recreation Ground, the side struggled, managing just a single win. Jack Roberts was the club's top goalscorer with 28 league strikes in 37 games – also making him the division's top scorer.

=== Finances ===
On the financial side, a bare profit of some £300 was recorded due to a transfer credit of £2,900. The annual summer clear-out saw the departure of 14 of the twenty-six players, including Sam Baum; Spencer Evans (Northwich Victoria); Roderick Welsh; Charlie Rattray (Accrington Stanley); Harry Johnson (Hartlepools United); Trevor Rhodes; and Fred Obrey (who was sold to Tranmere Rovers). At the season's end the club were delighted to hear they had been transferred to the Third Division South, where gate receipts were higher. On 27 June, another meeting at the Grand Hotel (Hanley) saw the issue of a name change debated, where Stoke United and Stoke North End were again considered. A name change was advocated by every letter written in by supporters; however, once again, there was insufficient time to implement a name change before the upcoming season.

=== Cup competitions ===
In the FA Cup, a first-round exit came at the hands of Midland League Gainsborough Trinity, after Trinity won the replay 2–1. In the short-lived Football League Third Division North Cup, Vale went out in the first round to Tranmere Rovers – a 1–1 stalemate at home was followed by a 2–0 defeat in the replay at Prenton Park.

== Results ==
=== Football League Third Division North ===
==== League table ====
| Pos | Team | Pld | W | D | L | GF | GA | GAv | Pts | Promotion |
|---|---|---|---|---|---|---|---|---|---|---|
| 13 | New Brighton | 42 | 15 | 8 | 19 | 60 | 61 | 0.984 | 38 | |
| 14 | Bradford City | 42 | 14 | 10 | 18 | 66 | 69 | 0.957 | 38 | |
| 15 | Port Vale | 42 | 12 | 14 | 16 | 65 | 73 | 0.890 | 38 | Transferred to the Third Division South |
| 16 | Southport | 42 | 12 | 14 | 16 | 53 | 82 | 0.646 | 38 | |
| 17 | Rochdale | 42 | 13 | 11 | 18 | 67 | 78 | 0.859 | 37 | |

Source: rsssf.com

==== Results by matchday ====
| Round | 1 | 2 | 3 | 4 | 5 | 6 | 7 | 8 | 9 | 10 | 11 | 12 | 13 | 14 | 15 | 16 | 17 | 18 | 19 | 20 | 21 | 22 | 23 | 24 | 25 | 26 | 27 | 28 | 29 | 30 | 31 | 32 | 33 | 34 | 35 | 36 | 37 | 38 | 39 | 40 | 41 | 42 |
|---|---|---|---|---|---|---|---|---|---|---|---|---|---|---|---|---|---|---|---|---|---|---|---|---|---|---|---|---|---|---|---|---|---|---|---|---|---|---|---|---|---|---|
| Ground | A | H | H | A | A | H | A | H | A | H | H | A | H | A | H | A | A | A | A | H | H | H | H | A | H | H | A | H | A | A | H | A | H | A | H | A | H | H | A | A | H | A |
| Result | L | D | W | L | L | W | W | W | D | W | D | L | W | L | L | L | L | D | L | W | D | D | W | D | D | D | L | W | L | L | W | D | W | L | D | L | L | D | D | L | W | D |
| Position | 20 | 17 | 14 | 14 | 17 | 13 | 11 | 10 | 9 | 9 | 7 | 9 | 9 | 10 | 11 | 13 | 16 | 15 | 17 | 14 | 14 | 13 | 12 | 12 | 11 | 12 | 13 | 11 | 13 | 13 | 12 | 12 | 12 | 12 | 12 | 14 | 15 | 14 | 14 | 16 | 13 | 15 |
| Points | 0 | 1 | 3 | 3 | 3 | 5 | 7 | 9 | 10 | 12 | 13 | 13 | 15 | 15 | 15 | 15 | 15 | 16 | 16 | 18 | 19 | 20 | 22 | 23 | 24 | 25 | 25 | 27 | 27 | 27 | 29 | 30 | 32 | 32 | 33 | 33 | 33 | 34 | 35 | 35 | 37 | 38 |

Source: Statto
A = Away; H = Home; W = Win; D = Draw; L = Loss

==== Matches ====
| 28 August 1937 1 | Oldham Athletic | 3–0 | Port Vale | Oldham |
| | | Report | | Stadium: Boundary Park; Attendance: 5,781 |

| 30 August 1937 2 | Port Vale | 2–2 | Gateshead | Hanley |
| | Caldwell; Roberts | Report | | Stadium: Old Recreation Ground; Attendance: 6,699 |

| 4 September 1937 3 | Port Vale | 1–0 | Darlington | Hanley |
| | Roberts | Report | | Stadium: Old Recreation Ground; Attendance: 7,233 |

| 8 September 1937 4 | Gateshead | 2–1 | Port Vale | Gateshead |
| | | Report | Roberts | Stadium: Redheugh Park; Attendance: 9,641 |

| 11 September 1937 5 | Doncaster Rovers | 3–2 | Port Vale | Doncaster |
| | | Report | Price; Caldwell | Stadium: Belle Vue; Attendance: 11,538 |

| 13 September 1937 6 | Port Vale | 3–2 | New Brighton | Hanley |
| | Caldwell; Roberts; Masters | Report | | Stadium: Old Recreation Ground; Attendance: 4,257 |

| 18 September 1937 7 | Crewe Alexandra | 1–2 | Port Vale | Crewe |
| | | Report | Price; Roberts | Stadium: Gresty Road; Attendance: 5,888 |

| 25 September 1937 8 | Port Vale | 4–0 | Barrow | Hanley |
| | Roberts | Report | | Stadium: Old Recreation Ground; Attendance: 7,416 |

| 2 October 1937 9 | Wrexham | 0–0 | Port Vale | Wrexham |
| 15:15 BST | | Report | | Stadium: Racecourse Ground; Attendance: 5,364; Referee: H.T. Wright |

| 9 October 1937 10 | Port Vale | 5–1 | Hartlepools United | Hanley |
| | Caldwell; Ward | Report | Scott | Stadium: Old Recreation Ground; Attendance: 7,951; Referee: H Hartley |

| 16 October 1937 11 | Port Vale | 1–1 | Southport | Hanley |
| | Masters | Report | | Stadium: Old Recreation Ground; Attendance: 8,151 |

| 23 October 1937 12 | Bradford City | 5–0 | Port Vale | Bradford |
| | | Report | | Stadium: Valley Parade; Attendance: 3,176 |

| 30 October 1937 13 | Port Vale | 3–2 | York City | Hanley |
| | Masters; Caldwell | Report | | Stadium: Old Recreation Ground; Attendance: 5,139 |

| 6 November 1937 14 | Tranmere Rovers | 2–1 | Port Vale | Prenton |
| | | Report | Masters | Stadium: Prenton Park; Attendance: 7,597 |

| 13 November 1937 15 | Port Vale | 0–2 | Halifax Town | Hanley |
| | | Report | | Stadium: Old Recreation Ground; Attendance: 6,579 |

| 20 November 1937 16 | Carlisle United | 3–1 | Port Vale | Carlisle |
| | | Report | Fish | Stadium: Brunton Park; Attendance: 4,959 |

| 4 December 1937 17 | Chester | 7–2 | Port Vale | Chester |
| | Horsman; Howarth; Chambers; Sargeant; Sanders; Johnson (og.) | Report | Roberts (pen.) | Stadium: Sealand Road; Attendance: 3,849 |

| 18 December 1937 18 | Rochdale | 1–1 | Port Vale | Rochdale |
| | Wynn | Report | Roberts (pen.) | Stadium: Spotland Stadium; Attendance: 3,560 |

| 27 December 1937 19 | Lincoln City | 1–0 | Port Vale | Lincoln |
| | | Report | | Stadium: Sincil Bank; Attendance: 13,354 |

| 28 December 1937 20 | Port Vale | 1–0 | Lincoln City | Hanley |
| | Roberts (pen.) | Report | | Stadium: Old Recreation Ground; Attendance: 5,740 |

| 1 January 1938 21 | Port Vale | 2–2 | Oldham Athletic | Hanley |
| | Roberts; Ward | Report | | Stadium: Old Recreation Ground; Attendance: 6,878 |

| 3 January 1938 22 | Port Vale | 0–0 | Rotherham United | Hanley |
| | | Report | | Stadium: Old Recreation Ground; Attendance: 3,604 |

| 8 January 1938 23 | Port Vale | 4–1 | Accrington Stanley | Hanley |
| | Roberts; Masters | Report | | Stadium: Old Recreation Ground; Attendance: 5,443 |

| 15 January 1938 24 | Darlington | 2–2 | Port Vale | Darlington |
| | | Report | Roberts; Ward | Stadium: Feethams; Attendance: 2,330 |

| 22 January 1938 25 | Port Vale | 1–1 | Doncaster Rovers | Hanley |
| | Caldwell | Report | | Stadium: Old Recreation Ground; Attendance: 7,153 |

| 29 January 1938 26 | Port Vale | 1–1 | Crewe Alexandra | Hanley |
| | Caldwell | Report | | Stadium: Old Recreation Ground; Attendance: 5,851 |

| 5 February 1938 27 | Barrow | 3–0 | Port Vale | Barrow-in-Furness |
| | | Report | | Stadium: Holker Street; Attendance: 5,759 |

| 12 February 1938 28 | Port Vale | 2–0 | Wrexham | Hanley |
| 15:15 GMT | Davies 55'; Caldwell 80' | Report | | Stadium: Old Recreation Ground; Attendance: 7,861; Referee: S. Hadley |

| 19 February 1938 29 | Hartlepools United | 2–1 | Port Vale | Hartlepool |
| | English; Scott | Report | Roberts | Stadium: Victoria Park; Attendance: 4,483; Referee: H Hartley |

| 26 February 1938 30 | Southport | 1–0 | Port Vale | Southport |
| | | Report | | Stadium: Ash Lane; Attendance: 3,797 |

| 5 March 1938 31 | Port Vale | 4–3 | Bradford City | Hanley |
| | Nolan; Davies; Roberts | Report | | Stadium: Old Recreation Ground; Attendance: 8,022 |

| 12 March 1938 32 | York City | 2–2 | Port Vale | York |
| | | Report | Roberts | Stadium: Bootham Crescent; Attendance: 7,319 |

| 19 March 1938 33 | Port Vale | 1–0 | Tranmere Rovers | Hanley |
| | Nolan | Report | | Stadium: Old Recreation Ground; Attendance: 9,916 |

| 26 March 1938 34 | Halifax Town | 2–1 | Port Vale | Halifax, West Yorkshire |
| | | Report | Roberts | Stadium: The Shay; Attendance: 4,363 |

| 2 April 1938 35 | Port Vale | 2–2 | Carlisle United | Hanley |
| | Rattray; Roberts | Report | | Stadium: Old Recreation Ground; Attendance: 6,463 |

| 9 April 1938 36 | Accrington Stanley | 2–1 | Port Vale | Accrington |
| | | Report | Nolan | Stadium: Peel Park; Attendance: 2,990 |

| 15 April 1938 37 | Port Vale | 2–4 | Hull City | Hanley |
| 15:15 GMT | Roberts | Report | Hubbard 18'; Davies 40'; Fryer 52'; Cumner 70' | Stadium: Old Recreation Ground; Attendance: 10,984 |

| 16 April 1938 38 | Port Vale | 2–2 | Chester | Hanley |
| | Nolan | Report | Gale | Stadium: Old Recreation Ground; Attendance: 6,695 |

| 18 April 1938 39 | Hull City | 0–0 | Port Vale | Kingston upon Hull |
| 15:15 GMT | | Report | | Stadium: Anlaby Road; Attendance: 13,564 |

| 23 April 1938 40 | Rotherham United | 3–2 | Port Vale | Rotherham |
| | | Report | Roberts; Nolan | Stadium: Millmoor; Attendance: 5,346 |

| 30 April 1938 41 | Port Vale | 4–1 | Rochdale | Hanley |
| | Masters; Roberts; Bellis | Report | Wynn (pen.) | Stadium: Old Recreation Ground; Attendance: 2,992 |

| 7 May 1938 42 | New Brighton | 1–1 | Port Vale | New Brighton, Merseyside |
| | | Report | Griffiths | Stadium: Sandheys Park; Attendance: 3,259 |

=== FA Cup ===
| 27 November 1937 R1 | Port Vale | 1–1 | Gainsborough Trinity | Hanley |
| | Roberts | Report | | Stadium: Old Recreation Ground; Attendance: 6,772 |

| 1 December 1937 Replay | Gainsborough Trinity | 2–1 | Port Vale | Gainsborough, Lincolnshire |
| | | Report | Roberts | Stadium: The Northolme; Attendance: 4,220 |

=== Third Division North Cup ===
| 11 October 1937 1 | Port Vale | 1–1 | Tranmere Rovers | Hanley |
| | Rattray | | | Stadium: Old Recreation Ground; Attendance: 900 |

| 10 November 1937 Replay | Tranmere Rovers | 2–0 | Port Vale | Prenton |
| | | | | Stadium: Prenton Park; Attendance: 500 |

== Squad statistics ==
=== Appearances and goals ===
Key to positions: GK – Goalkeeper; FB – Full back; HB – Half back; FW – Forward

| No. | Pos | Nat | Player | Total | | Third Division North | | FA Cup | | Third Division North Cup | |
| No. | Pos | Nat | Player | Apps | Goals | Apps | Goals | Apps | Goals | Apps | Goals |
|---|---|---|---|---|---|---|---|---|---|---|---|
| | GK | (England) ENG | George Heppell | 27 | 0 | 25 | 0 | 1 | 0 | 1 | 0 |
| | GK | (England) ENG | James Nicholls | 19 | 0 | 17 | 0 | 1 | 0 | 1 | 0 |
| | FB | (England) ENG | Harry Johnson | 21 | 0 | 19 | 0 | 0 | 0 | 2 | 0 |
| | FB | (England) ENG | Johnny Rowe | 40 | 0 | 37 | 0 | 2 | 0 | 1 | 0 |
| | FB | (England) ENG | Roderick Welsh | 31 | 0 | 27 | 0 | 2 | 0 | 2 | 0 |
| | HB | (England) ENG | Frank Briggs | 8 | 0 | 8 | 0 | 0 | 0 | 0 | 0 |
| | HB | (Wales) WAL | Spencer Evans | 37 | 0 | 34 | 0 | 2 | 0 | 1 | 0 |
| | HB | (England) ENG | Harry Griffiths | 28 | 1 | 27 | 1 | 1 | 0 | 0 | 0 |
| | HB | (England) ENG | Fred Obrey | 18 | 0 | 16 | 0 | 2 | 0 | 0 | 0 |
| | HB | (England) ENG | Trevor Rhodes | 14 | 0 | 13 | 0 | 0 | 0 | 1 | 0 |
| | HB | (England) ENG | Harry Sellars | 0 | 0 | 0 | 0 | 0 | 0 | 0 | 0 |
| | HB | (England) ENG | Wilf Smith | 22 | 0 | 21 | 0 | 0 | 0 | 1 | 0 |
| | HB | (England) ENG | Arthur Whittaker | 0 | 0 | 0 | 0 | 0 | 0 | 0 | 0 |
| | HB | (England) ENG | Stanley Dimbleby | 2 | 0 | 1 | 0 | 0 | 0 | 1 | 0 |
| | FW | (England) ENG | Sam Baum | 3 | 0 | 3 | 0 | 0 | 0 | 0 | 0 |
| | FW | (England) ENG | Alf Bellis | 1 | 1 | 1 | 1 | 0 | 0 | 0 | 0 |
| | FW | (England) ENG | Arthur Caldwell | 37 | 10 | 35 | 10 | 1 | 0 | 1 | 0 |
| | FW | (England) ENG | Arthur Cumberlidge | 26 | 0 | 23 | 0 | 1 | 0 | 2 | 0 |
| | FW | (England) ENG | Harry Davies | 15 | 2 | 15 | 2 | 0 | 0 | 0 | 0 |
| | FW | (South Africa) RSA | Ken Fish | 6 | 1 | 5 | 1 | 1 | 0 | 0 | 0 |
| | FW | (England) ENG | Arthur Masters | 35 | 8 | 33 | 8 | 2 | 0 | 0 | 0 |
| | FW | (England) ENG | Tom Nolan | 20 | 7 | 18 | 7 | 1 | 0 | 1 | 0 |
| | FW | (England) ENG | Charlie Rattray | 25 | 2 | 22 | 1 | 1 | 0 | 2 | 1 |
| | FW | (England) ENG | Jack Roberts | 40 | 30 | 37 | 28 | 2 | 2 | 1 | 0 |
| | FW | (England) ENG | Billy Tunnicliffe | 4 | 0 | 2 | 0 | 2 | 0 | 0 | 0 |
Players who featured but departed the club during the season:
| | HB | (England) ENG | Tommy Ward | 14 | 4 | 11 | 4 | 1 | 0 | 2 | 0 |
| | FW | (England) ENG | Arthur Ford | 0 | 0 | 0 | 0 | 0 | 0 | 0 | 0 |
| | FW | (England) ENG | William Price | 14 | 2 | 13 | 2 | 0 | 0 | 1 | 0 |

=== Top scorers ===
| Place | Position | Nation | Name | Third Division North | FA Cup | Northern Cup | Total |
|---|---|---|---|---|---|---|---|
| 1 | FW | England | Jack Roberts | 28 | 2 | 0 | 30 |
| 2 | FW | England | Arthur Caldwell | 10 | 0 | 0 | 10 |
| 3 | FW | England | Arthur Masters | 8 | 0 | 0 | 8 |
| 4 | FW | England | Tom Nolan | 7 | 0 | 0 | 7 |
| 5 | HB | England | Tommy Ward | 4 | 0 | 0 | 4 |
| 6 | FW | England | Charlie Rattray | 1 | 0 | 1 | 2 |
| – | FW | England | William Price | 2 | 0 | 0 | 2 |
| – | FW | England | Harry Davies | 2 | 0 | 0 | 2 |
| 9 | FW | South Africa | Ken Fish | 1 | 0 | 0 | 1 |
| – | HB | England | Harry Griffiths | 1 | 0 | 0 | 1 |
| – | FW | England | Alf Bellis | 1 | 0 | 0 | 1 |
| – | – | – | Own goals | 0 | 0 | 0 | 0 |
| | | | TOTALS | 65 | 2 | 1 | 68 |

== Transfers ==
=== Transfers in ===
| Date from | Position | Nationality | Name | From | Fee | Ref. |
|---|---|---|---|---|---|---|
| May 1937 | GK | ENG | George Heppell | Wolverhampton Wanderers | Free transfer | |
| May 1937 | FW | ENG | William Price | Fulham | Free transfer | |
| May 1937 | FW | ENG | Charlie Rattray | Mansfield Town | Free transfer | |
| May 1937 | FB | ENG | Johnny Rowe | Queen's Park Rangers | Free transfer | |
| June 1937 | HB | ENG | Stanley Dimbleby | Hull City | Free transfer | |
| June 1937 | FB | ENG | Harry Johnson | Newcastle United | Free transfer | |
| June 1937 | FW | ENG | Arthur Masters | Nottingham Forest | Exchange | |
| June 1937 | GK | ENG | James Nicholls | Brentford | Free transfer | |
| November 1937 | FW | RSA | Ken Fish | Aston Villa | 'Sizeable' | |
| February 1938 | FW | ENG | Harry Davies | Stoke City | Exchange | |
| March 1938 | FW | ENG | Sam Baum | Bolton Wanderers | Free transfer | |
| March 1938 | FW | ENG | Alf Bellis | Burnell's Ironworks | Free transfer | |
| March 1938 | FW | ENG | Joe Wheatley | Ellesmere Port Town | Free transfer | |

=== Transfers out ===
| Date from | Position | Nationality | Name | To | Fee | Ref. |
|---|---|---|---|---|---|---|
| September 1937 | FW | ENG | Arthur Ford | Wolverhampton Wanderers | Free transfer | |
| November 1937 | FW | ENG | William Price | | Mutual consent | |
| February 1938 | HB | ENG | Tommy Ward | Stoke City | 'Small' | |
| May 1938 | FW | ENG | Sam Baum | | Released | |
| May 1938 | HB | ENG | Frank Briggs | Aston Villa | Released | |
| May 1938 | HB | ENG | Stanley Dimbleby | | Released | |
| May 1938 | HB | WAL | Spencer Evans | Northwich Victoria | Free transfer | |
| May 1938 | FW | ENG | Charlie Rattray | Accrington Stanley | Free transfer | |
| May 1938 | FW | ENG | Billy Tunnicliffe | Bournemouth | Free transfer | |
| May 1938 | FB | ENG | Roderick Welsh | | Released | |
| June 1938 | HB | ENG | Fred Obrey | Tranmere Rovers | Free transfer | |
| Summer 1938 | FB | ENG | Harry Johnson | Hartlepools United | Free transfer | |
| Summer 1938 | GK | ENG | James Nicholls | | Released | |
| Summer 1938 | HB | ENG | Trevor Rhodes | | Released | |
