= Sam Baum =

English footballer

Personal information
- Full name: Samuel Baum
- Date of birth: 4 May 1914
- Place of birth: Sunderland, England
- Date of death: 19 June 2002 (aged 88)
- Place of death: Bolton, England
- Position: Right winger

Senior career*
Years	Team	Apps	(Gls)
1936–1937	Bolton Wanderers	0	(0)
- → Darwen (loan)
- South Shields
- Bolton Wanderers
1938	Port Vale	3	(0)
- * Club domestic league appearances and goals

Samuel Baum (4 May 1914 – 19 June 2002) was an English footballer who played as a right winger for Bolton Wanderers, Darwen, South Shields, and Port Vale.

== Career ==
Baum played for Bolton Wanderers in two spells, Darwen (on loan) and South Shields, before joining Port Vale in March 1938 with just two minutes of the transfer window remaining. He played just three Third Division North games before being handed a free transfer away from the Old Recreation Ground at the end of the 1937–38 season in May 1938.

== Career statistics ==
Appearances and goals by club, season and competition
Club	Season	League			FA Cup		Total	
Club	Season	Division	Apps	Goals	Apps	Goals	Apps	Goals
Bolton Wanderers	1936–37	First Division	0	0	0	0	0	0
Port Vale	1937–38	Second Division	3	0	0	0	3	0
