= Murdoch Dickie =

Scottish footballer (1919–2004)

Personal information
- Full name: Murdoch Macfarlane Dickie
- Date of birth: 28 December 1919
- Place of birth: Dumbarton, Scotland
- Date of death: February 2004 (aged 84)
- Place of death: Leicester, England
- Height: 5 ft 8 in (1.73 m)
- Position: Right winger

Youth career
- Crewe Alexandra

Senior career*
Years	Team	Apps	(Gls)
1939	Port Vale	0	(0)
1944–1945	Port Vale	0	(0)
1945–1946	Guildford City		
1946–1947	Chelsea	1	(0)
1947–1948	Bournemouth & Boscombe Athletic	17	(1)
- * Club domestic league appearances and goals

Murdoch Macfarlane Dickie (28 December 1919 – February 2004) was a Scottish footballer who played for Crewe Alexandra, Port Vale, Guildford City, Chelsea, and Bournemouth & Boscombe Athletic.

== Career ==
Dickie played for Crewe Alexandra before joining Port Vale in May 1939. He played two league games, but had his contract cancelled in December 1939. After guesting for Walsall during the war he rejoined Vale in October 1944. He played three war league matches before moving on to Guildford City, probably in the autumn of 1945. He played one First Division game for Billy Birrell's Chelsea in 1946–47. He then left Stamford Bridge and signed with Bournemouth & Boscombe Athletic. He scored twice in 16 league games in 1947–48, helping Harry Lowe's "Cherries" to a second-place finish in the Third Division South. Dickie then left both Dean Court and the English Football League.

== Career statistics ==
Appearances and goals by club, season and competition
Club	Season	League			FA Cup		Other		Total	
Club	Season	Division	Apps	Goals	Apps	Goals	Apps	Goals	Apps	Goals
Port Vale	1939–40		0	0	0	0	2	0	2	0
Chelsea	1946–47	First Division	1	0	0	0	0	0	1	0
Bournemouth & Boscombe Athletic	1946–47	Third Division South	16	1	0	0	0	0	16	1
Bournemouth & Boscombe Athletic	1947–48	Third Division South	1	0	0	0	0	0	1	0
Bournemouth & Boscombe Athletic	Total		17	1	0	0	0	0	17	1
Career total			18	1	0	0	2	0	20	1

== Honours ==
Bournemouth & Boscombe Athletic

- Football League Third Division South second-place promotion: 1947–48
