= Stanley Dimbleby =

English footballer

Personal information
- Full name: Stanley Dimbleby
- Date of birth: 27 November 1916
- Place of birth: South Killingholme, England
- Date of death: 17 October 1992 (aged 75)
- Place of death: Kirk Ella, England
- Height: 6 ft 1 in (1.85 m)
- Position: Left-half

Youth career
- South Killingholme

Senior career*
Years	Team	Apps	(Gls)
1935–1937	Hull City	20	(0)
1937–1938	Port Vale	1	(0)
Total		21	(0)
- * Club domestic league appearances and goals

Stanley Dimbleby (27 November 1916 – 17 October 1992) was an English footballer who played at left-half for Hull City and Port Vale.

== Career ==
=== Hull City ===
Dimbleby attracted the attention of Hull City while playing local football for his village team, South Killingholme, at the age of 18. He joined Hull City in August 1935 and spent much of the 1935–36 season with the reserves. He made his first-team debut at left half late in the campaign under newly reappointed manager David Menzies, with the club struggling near the bottom of the Second Division and facing relegation. Retained for the 1936–37 season, Dimbleby became a useful deputy across the half-back line. He made four starts at left half early in the season before moving to centre half for three matches in October 1936 in place of injured club captain and first-choice centre half Billy Tabram. Following Menzies' death in office in October 1936, the directors assumed responsibility for team selection, and Dimbleby started six matches over the Christmas and New Year period. However, after Ernest Blackburn was appointed manager in January 1937, Dimbleby soon returned to the reserves. He was given a free transfer at the end of the season.

=== Port Vale ===
In June 1937, Dimbleby joined Third Division North club Port Vale in June 1937. He made his debut in a 2–1 win at near-rivals Crewe Alexandra on 18 September 1937, but suffered a knee injury in a reserve-team match in November. His attempted return on New Year's Day 1938 lasted only ten minutes before he was forced to withdraw, and a cartilage operation was recommended. He required a second operation in April, but was released by Port Vale the following month, bringing his playing career to a close with the finish of the 1937–38 season.

== Career statistics ==
Appearances and goals by club, season and competition
Club	Season	League			FA Cup		Other		Total	
Club	Season	Division	Apps	Goals	Apps	Goals	Apps	Goals	Apps	Goals
Hull City	1935–36	Second Division	7	0	0	0	—		7	0
Hull City	1936–37	Third Division North	13	0	0	0	0	0	13	0
Hull City	Total		20	0	0	0	0	0	20	0
Port Vale	1937–38	Third Division North	1	0	0	0	1	0	2	0
Career total			21	0	0	0	1	0	22	0
