= Johnny Rowe (footballer, born 1907) =

English footballer

Personal information
- Full name: Jonathan Rowe
- Date of birth: 1907
- Place of birth: Stoke-on-Trent, England
- Date of death: 1953 (aged 45–46)
- Height: 5 ft 7 1/2 in (1.71 m)
- Position: Right-back

Senior career*
| Years | Team | Apps | (Gls) |
- Manchester Central
| 1932–1935 | Reading | 77 | (0) |
| 1935–1937 | Queens Park Rangers | 52 | (0) |
| 1937–1940 | Port Vale | 72 | (0) |
| Total | | 201 | (0) |
- * Club domestic league appearances and goals

Jonathan Rowe (1907 — 1953) was an English footballer who played at right-back for Manchester Central, Reading, Queen's Park Rangers, and Port Vale before World War II.

== Career ==
Rowe played for Manchester Central, Reading and Queens Park Rangers before joining Port Vale in May 1937. He played 37 Third Division North games during the 1937–38 season, and featured in 35 Third Division South in the 1938–39 campaign. He left the Old Recreation Ground during World War II, though later guested for Crewe Alexandra.

== Career statistics ==
Appearances and goals by club, season and competition
| Club | Season | League | | | FA Cup | | Other | | Total | |
| Club | Season | Division | Apps | Goals | Apps | Goals | Apps | Goals | Apps | Goals |
|---|---|---|---|---|---|---|---|---|---|---|
| Reading | 1932–33 | Third Division South | 25 | 0 | 4 | 0 | 0 | 0 | 29 | 0 |
| Reading | 1933–34 | Third Division South | 39 | 0 | 1 | 0 | 0 | 0 | 40 | 0 |
| Reading | 1934–35 | Third Division South | 13 | 0 | 0 | 0 | 1 | 0 | 14 | 0 |
| Reading | Total | | 77 | 0 | 5 | 0 | 1 | 0 | 83 | 0 |
| Queens Park Rangers | 1935–36 | Third Division South | 32 | 0 | 1 | 0 | 1 | 0 | 34 | 0 |
| Queens Park Rangers | 1936–37 | Third Division South | 20 | 0 | 3 | 0 | 0 | 0 | 23 | 0 |
| Queens Park Rangers | Total | | 52 | 0 | 4 | 0 | 1 | 0 | 57 | 0 |
| Port Vale | 1937–38 | Third Division North | 37 | 0 | 2 | 0 | 1 | 0 | 40 | 0 |
| Port Vale | 1938–39 | Third Division South | 35 | 0 | 2 | 0 | 3 | 0 | 40 | 0 |
| Port Vale | 1939–40 | Third Division South | 0 | 0 | 0 | 0 | 2 | 0 | 2 | 0 |
| Port Vale | Total | | 72 | 0 | 4 | 0 | 6 | 0 | 82 | 0 |
| Career total | | | 201 | 0 | 13 | 0 | 8 | 0 | 222 | 0 |
