= Arthur Masters =

English footballer

Personal information
- Full name: Arthur Masters
- Date of birth: 10 August 1910
- Place of birth: Coppull, England
- Date of death: 1998 (aged 87–88)
- Height: 5 ft 7 in (1.70 m)
- Position: Forward

Senior career*
Years	Team	Apps	(Gls)
- Horwich R.M.I.
1932–1939	Nottingham Forest	109	(24)
1937–1939	Port Vale	66	(13)
Total		175	(37)
- * Club domestic league appearances and goals

Arthur Masters (17 August 1910 – 1998) was an English footballer who played as a forward for Horwich R.M.I., Nottingham Forest, and Port Vale in the 1930s.

== Career ==
Masters played for Horwich R.M.I. and Nottingham Forest, before joining Port Vale in exchange for Allan Todd in June 1937. He scored eight goals in 33 Third Division North and two FA Cup appearances in the 1937–38 season. He was twice knocked out in a 1–1 draw with Crewe Alexandra at the Old Recreation Ground on 19 January; perhaps not surprisingly, he later said that he had no recollection of the game. He then scored five goals in Third Division South 33 games in the 1938–39 season, before leaving the "Valiants".

== Career statistics ==
Appearances and goals by club, season and competition
Club	Season	League			FA Cup		Other		Total	
Club	Season	Division	Apps	Goals	Apps	Goals	Apps	Goals	Apps	Goals
Nottingham Forest	1932–33	Second Division	6	2	0	0	0	0	6	2
Nottingham Forest	1933–34	Second Division	37	8	3	0	0	0	40	8
Nottingham Forest	1934–35	Second Division	31	6	5	2	0	0	36	8
Nottingham Forest	1935–36	Second Division	30	7	1	0	0	0	31	7
Nottingham Forest	1936–37	Second Division	5	1	0	0	0	0	5	1
Nottingham Forest	Total		109	24	9	2	0	0	118	26
Port Vale	1937–38	Third Division North	33	8	2	0	0	0	35	8
Port Vale	1938–39	Third Division South	33	5	2	0	2	2	37	7
Port Vale	Total		66	13	4	0	2	2	72	15
Career total			175	37	13	2	2	2	190	41
