= John Sanderson (footballer) =

English footballer

Personal information
- Full name: John Sanderson
- Date of birth: 17 July 1920
- Place of birth: Newcastle upon Tyne, England
- Date of death: 2003 (aged 82–83)
- Height: 5 ft 8 in (1.73 m)
- Position: Inside right

Youth career
- Newcastle United

Senior career*
Years	Team	Apps	(Gls)
1938–1946	Port Vale	1	(0)
Total		1	(0)
- * Club domestic league appearances and goals

John Sanderson (17 July 1920 – 2003) was a footballer who played at inside-right for Port Vale around World War II.

== Career ==
Sanderson joined Port Vale from Newcastle United in June 1938. He made his debut in the 1938–39 season, and played the first two matches of the cancelled 1939–40 season, before war broke out. He returned to the Old Recreation Ground in March 1945 but failed to gain a regular spot and was given a free transfer in May 1946.

== Career statistics ==
Appearances and goals by club, season and competition
Club	Season	League			FA Cup		Other		Total	
Club	Season	Division	Apps	Goals	Apps	Goals	Apps	Goals	Apps	Goals
Port Vale	1938–39	Third Division South	1	0	0	0	0	0	1	0
Port Vale	1939–40	–	0	0	0	0	2	0	2	0
Port Vale	Total		1	0	0	0	2	0	3	0
