= Bill Booth (footballer) =

English footballer

Personal information
- Full name: William Samuel Booth
- Date of birth: 7 July 1920
- Place of birth: Hove, England
- Date of death: 18 February 1990 (aged 69)
- Place of death: Eastbourne, England
- Position: Centre-half

Youth career
- Hove Penguins
- Brighton & Hove Albion

Senior career*
Years	Team	Apps	(Gls)
	Wolverhampton Wanderers	0	(0)
1939	Port Vale	9	(0)
1939	Cardiff City	0	(0)
1947–1949	Brighton & Hove Albion	28	(6)
- Hastings United

Managerial career
- 1966–1968: Eastbourne
- 1971–1972: Eastbourne Town
- * Club domestic league appearances and goals

William Samuel Booth (7 July 1920 – 18 February 1990) was an English football player and manager who played in the English Football League for Brighton & Hove Albion and Port Vale.

== Playing career ==
Booth played for Hove Penguins and Brighton & Hove Albion, before joining First Division club Wolverhampton Wanderers. He was unable to break into their first-team at Molineux and moved to Port Vale in the Third Division South in February 1939.

After ten consecutive games for the "Valiants" in 1938–39, he was given a free transfer to league rivals Cardiff City. He later guested for Birmingham City and Leeds United during the war, before moving permanently back to Brighton & Hove Albion after the war. Don Welsh's "Seagulls" finished bottom of the Third Division South in 1947–48 and had to apply for re-election before rising to sixth place in 1948–49. He then moved into non-League football with the newly founded Southern League club Hastings United.

== Management career ==
Booth managed Eastbourne from 1966 to 1968 and again in the Athenian League between 1971 and 1972.

== Career statistics ==
Appearances and goals by club, season and competition
Club	Season	League			FA Cup		Other		Total	
Club	Season	Division	Apps	Goals	Apps	Goals	Apps	Goals	Apps	Goals
Port Vale	1938–39	Third Division South	9	0	0	0	1	0	10	0
Cardiff City	1939–40	Third Division South	0	0	0	0	3	0	3	0
Brighton & Hove Albion	1947–48	Third Division South	20	5	1	1	0	0	21	6
Brighton & Hove Albion	1948–49	Third Division South	8	1	0	0	0	0	8	1
Brighton & Hove Albion	Total		28	6	1	1	0	0	29	7
