= George Hannah (footballer, born 1914) =

English footballer

Personal information
- Full name: George Lamb Hannah
- Date of birth: 25 September 1914
- Place of birth: Sunderland, England
- Date of death: 1977 (aged 62–63)
- Height: 5 ft 9 in (1.75 m)
- Position: Right-half

Youth career
- Washington Colliery
- Derby County

Senior career*
Years	Team	Apps	(Gls)
1938–1946	Port Vale	42	(0)
Total		42	(0)
- * Club domestic league appearances and goals

George Lamb Hannah (25 September 1914 – 1977) was an English footballer.

== Career ==
Hannah played for Washington Colliery and Derby County before joining Port Vale in June 1938. He was an ever-present during the 1938–39 season, but lost his place in October 1939. He guested for Nottingham Forest and Mansfield Town during the war, returning to the Old Recreation Ground in August 1944 once Port Vale started playing regular football once again. He still could not establish himself in the first-team but departed the club in the summer of 1946.

== Career statistics ==
Appearances and goals by club, season and competition
Club	Season	League			FA Cup		Other		Total	
Club	Season	Division	Apps	Goals	Apps	Goals	Apps	Goals	Apps	Goals
Port Vale	1938–39	Third Division South	42	0	2	0	4	0	48	0
Port Vale	1939–40	–	0	0	0	0	2	0	2	0
Port Vale	Total		42	0	2	0	6	0	50	0
