= John Smith (footballer, born 1921) =

English footballer

Personal information
- Full name: John Frederick Smith
- Date of birth: 30 May 1920
- Place of birth: Stoke-on-Trent, England
- Date of death: 2004 (aged 83–84)
- Position: Forward

Senior career*
Years	Team	Apps	(Gls)
1938–1939	Port Vale	13	(0)
1939	Chelsea	0	(0)
1946–19??	Guildford City		
Total		13	(0)
- * Club domestic league appearances and goals

John Frederick Smith (30 May 1920 – 2004) was an English footballer who played for Port Vale, before transferring to Chelsea just before the outbreak of World War II.

== Career ==
Smith joined Port Vale in September 1938. He scored on his debut at inside-right in a 4–0 win over Walsall in a first round Southern Section Cup match at the Old Recreation Ground on 26 September. He made 13 Third Division South and five cup appearances in 1938–39, before he transferred to Chelsea in May 1939. He later joined Guildford City in 1946.

== Career statistics ==
Appearances and goals by club, season and competition
Club	Season	League			FA Cup		Other		Total	
Club	Season	Division	Apps	Goals	Apps	Goals	Apps	Goals	Apps	Goals
Port Vale	1938–39	Third Division South	13	0	1	0	3	2	17	2
Chelsea	1939–40	–	0	0	0	0	3	2	3	2
