= Frank Briggs (footballer) =

English footballer

Personal information
- Full name: Frank Briggs
- Date of birth: 1 February 1917
- Place of birth: Salford, Greater Manchester, England
- Date of death: 11 April 1984 (aged 67)
- Place of death: Bury, England
- Height: 5 ft 8 in (1.73 m)
- Position: Left-half

Youth career
- Altrincham

Senior career*
Years	Team	Apps	(Gls)
1937–1938	Port Vale	8	(0)
1938–1939	Aston Villa	0	(0)
1939	Wrexham	0	(0)
- Oswestry Town
Total		8	(0)
- * Club domestic league appearances and goals

Frank Briggs (1 February 1917 – 11 April 1984) was an English footballer who played for Port Vale, Aston Villa, Wrexham, and Watford (as a guest).

== Career ==
Briggs was a reserve team player at Altrincham before he joined Port Vale in December 1937, at the age of 20. He played a mere eight Third Division North games in the 1937–38 season before being released from the Old Recreation Ground in May 1938. He moved on to Aston Villa in May 1938. He later played for Wrexham. He also guested for Watford during the Second World War. After the war he played non-League football with Oswestry Town.

== Career statistics ==
Appearances and goals by club, season and competition
Club	Season	League			FA Cup		Other		Total	
Club	Season	Division	Apps	Goals	Apps	Goals	Apps	Goals	Apps	Goals
Port Vale	1937–38	Third Division North	8	0	0	0	0	0	8	0
Aston Villa	1938–39	Second Division	0	0	0	0	0	0	0	0
Wrexham	1939–40		0	0	0	0	3	0	3	0
Career total			8	0	0	0	3	0	11	0
