= James Nicholls (footballer) =

English footballer

Personal information
- Full name: James Henry Nicholls
- Date of birth: 24 September 1908
- Place of birth: Bilston, England
- Date of death: 20 August 1984 (aged 75)
- Place of death: Dudley, England
- Height: 1.91 m (6 ft 3 in)
- Position: Goalkeeper

Senior career*
Years	Team	Apps	(Gls)
- Darlaston
- Cradley Heath
- Sunbeam Motor Works
- Bloxwich Strollers
- Bilston United
	Blackpool	0	(0)
1932–1933	Manchester City	16	(0)
1934–1937	Brentford	7	(0)
1937–1938	Port Vale	17	(0)
Total		40+	(0)
- * Club domestic league appearances and goals

James Henry Nicholls (24 September 1908 – 20 August 1984) was an English professional footballer who played as a goalkeeper in the Football League for Manchester City, Brentford and Port Vale.

== Career ==
=== Early years ===
A goalkeeper, in his early career Nicholls played for Darlaston, Cradley Heath, Sunbeam Motor Works, Bloxwich Strollers, Bilston United, Blackpool and Manchester City. He made 16 First Division appearances for the latter club.

=== Brentford ===
Nicholls transferred to Second Division club Brentford during the 1934 off-season. Unable to oust James Mathieson from the team, Nicholls failed to make a first-team appearance during his first two seasons at Griffin Park and instead played for the reserve team, with which he won the London Challenge Cup in 1934–35. With the Bees then in the First Division, Nicholls finally made his first-team debut in a 1–1 draw with Huddersfield Town on 12 September 1936. He made six further appearances during the 1936–37 season, before returning to the reserves and leaving the club at the end of the campaign.

=== Port Vale ===
Nicholls joined Third Division North club Port Vale in June 1937 as a replacement for Allan Todd. He made his debut in a 3–0 defeat to Oldham Athletic at Boundary Park on 28 August and played the first 16 games of the 1937–38 season, until suffering a knee injury in December 1937. Goalkeeper George Heppell established himself in the position, which left Nicholls surplus to requirements, and he departed the Old Recreation Ground at the end of the 1937–38 season.

== Career statistics ==
Appearances and goals by club, season and competition
Club	Season	League			Cups		Total	
Club	Season	Division	Apps	Goals	Apps	Goals	Apps	Goals
Manchester City	1932–33	First Division	14	0	0	0	14	0
Manchester City	1933–34	First Division	2	0	0	0	2	0
Manchester City	Total		16	0	0	0	16	0
Brentford	1936–37	First Division	7	0	0	0	7	0
Port Vale	1937–38	Third Division North	17	0	2	0	19	0
Total			40	0	2	0	42	0

== Honours ==
Brentford Reserves

- London Challenge Cup: 1934–35
