= Harry Johnson (footballer, born 1913) =

English footballer

Personal information
- Date of birth: 8 August 1913
- Place of birth: Walker, Newcastle upon Tyne, England
- Date of death: 1976 (aged 62–63)
- Place of death: Nottingham, England
- Height: 5 ft 10 in (1.78 m)
- Position: Left-back

Youth career
- Walker Park

Senior career*
Years	Team	Apps	(Gls)
1933–1937	Newcastle United	5	(0)
1937–1938	Port Vale	19	(0)
- Hartlepools United
Total		24+	(0+)
- * Club domestic league appearances and goals

Harry Johnson (8 August 1913 – 1976) was an English footballer who played at left-back for Newcastle United, Port Vale, and Hartlepools United in the 1930s.

== Career ==
Johnson played for Walker Park before joining Newcastle United in 1933. He spent four years at the club, making five league appearances. During his time at St James' Park, the "Magpies" were relegated out of the First Division in 1933–34 and made unsuccessfully pushes for promotion in 1934–35, 1935–36, and 1936–37. He signed with Port Vale in June 1937. He made 21 Third Division North and cup appearances in the 1937–38 season, before he was transferred away from the Old Recreation Ground to Hartlepools United.

== Style of play ==
Johnson was a tough-tackling left-back.

== Career statistics ==
Appearances and goals by club, season and competition
Club	Season	League			FA Cup		Other		Total	
Club	Season	Division	Apps	Goals	Apps	Goals	Apps	Goals	Apps	Goals
Newcastle United	1935–36	Second Division	5	0	0	0	0	0	5	0
Port Vale	1937–38	Third Division North	19	0	0	0	2	0	21	0
Hartlepool United	1938–39	Third Division North	24	0	2	0	1	0	27	0
