= William Price (footballer) =

English footballer

Personal information
- Full name: William John Price
- Date of birth: 4 December 1903
- Place of birth: Mhow, India
- Date of death: 22 June 1987 (aged 83)
- Place of death: Swansea, Wales
- Height: 5 ft 5 in (1.65 m)
- Position: Inside left

Youth career
- Coldstream Guards
- 10th Royal Hussars
- Woking Town

Senior career*
Years	Team	Apps	(Gls)
1928	Brentford	1	(1)
1929–1937	Fulham	189	(49)
1937	Port Vale	13	(2)
Total		203	(52)

International career
1927–1928	England Amateurs	3	(2)
1929	Football Association XI		
- * Club domestic league appearances and goals

William John Price (4 December 1903 – 22 June 1987), sometimes known as Johnny Price, was an English professional footballer, who was born in India. An inside left, he played for Brentford, Fulham, Port Vale and England at amateur level. His most significant spell was with Fulham from 1929 to 1937, who he helped to win the Third Division South championship in the 1931–32 season.

== Club career ==
Price began his football career in army football with the Coldstream Guards and the 10th Royal Hussars. Initially an amateur, he joined Third Division South club Brentford from Isthmian League club Woking Town in 1928. He scored on his only first-team appearance for the Bees in a 3–1 victory over Norwich City on Good Friday 1928. Price subsequently turned professional and played for Fulham between 1928 and 1937, with whom he won the 1931–32 Third Division South championship.

After making 204 appearances and scoring 53 goals for Fulham, Price joined Port Vale in May 1937 and scored two goals in 13 Third Division North appearances during the 1937–38 season. In November 1937, Price had his contract at the Old Recreation Ground cancelled by mutual consent, as he wished to travel south to work as a coach with Wimbledon. He later became the coach of Yiewsley, before he was appointed assistant secretary of Fulham.

== International career ==
While with Woking, Price won three England Amateur international caps. In 1929, he was invited to play in a trial match versus the full England team. He was included in the Football Association XI for a tour of South Africa and Rhodesia the same year.

== Career statistics ==
Appearances and goals by club, season and competition
Club	Season	League			FA Cup		Other		Total	
Club	Season	Division	Apps	Goals	Apps	Goals	Apps	Goals	Apps	Goals
Brentford	1927–28	Third Division South	1	1	0	0	―		1	1
Fulham	1928–29	Third Division South	29	13	3	1	―		32	14
Fulham	1929–30	Third Division South	25	9	4	1	―		29	10
Fulham	1930–31	Third Division South	19	6	1	1	―		20	7
Fulham	1931–32	Third Division South	31	4	5	1	―		36	5
Fulham	1932–33	Second Division	30	6	1	0	―		31	6
Fulham	1933–34	Second Division	26	4	0	0	―		26	4
Fulham	1934–35	Second Division	23	4	1	0	―		24	4
Fulham	1935–36	Second Division	4	2	0	0	―		4	2
Fulham	1936–37	Second Division	2	1	0	0	―		2	1
Fulham	Total		189	49	15	4	―		204	53
Port Vale	1937–38	Third Division North	13	2	0	0	1 (Note: Appearance in Third Division North Cup)	0	14	2
Career total			203	52	15	4	1	0	219	56

== Honours ==
Fulham

- Football League Third Division South: 1931–32
