= Thomas Clerke =

Thomas Clerke may refer to:

- Thomas Henry Shadwell Clerke (1792–1849), Irish soldier and military journalist
- Thomas Clerke (songwriter), Sunderland singer-songwriter and poet
- Thomas Clerke (bishop), Bishop of Killala
- Thomas Clerke (MP) (c. 1485–1555), English politician

== See also ==
- Thomas Clerk (disambiguation)
- Thomas Clark (disambiguation)
- Thomas Clarke (disambiguation)
