= John Callender (footballer) =

English footballer

Personal information
- Full name: John Callender
- Date of birth: 3 September 1903
- Place of birth: West Wylam, England
- Date of death: 13 December 1980 (aged 77)
- Place of death: Chesterfield, England
- Position: Right winger

Youth career
- Walker Celtic
- 1933: Brighton & Hove Albion
- Walker Celtic

Senior career*
Years	Team	Apps	(Gls)
1934	Chesterfield	5	(1)
- Ashington
1936–1938	Lincoln City	75	(26)
1938–1939	Port Vale	3	(1)
1939	Gateshead	3	(2)
Total		86+	(30+)
- * Club domestic league appearances and goals

John Callender (3 September 1903 – 13 December 1980) was an English footballer who played as a right winger for Walker Celtic, Brighton & Hove Albion, Chesterfield, Ashington, Lincoln City, Port Vale, and Gateshead.

== Career ==
Callender played for Walker Celtic and Brighton & Hove Albion before scoring one goal in five Third Division North games for Chesterfield in 1934. After a spell with Ashington, he moved on to Lincoln City. The "Imps" finished second in the Third Division North in 1936–37, three points behind champions Stockport County. They then dropped to seventh place in 1937–38. He scored 26 goals in 75 league games in his two seasons at Sincil Bank. He joined Port Vale in May 1938. He played three Third Division South games, scoring one goal in the season-opening 3–1 defeat to Aldershot at the Old Recreation Ground on 27 August. He was handed a free transfer in April 1939. He moved on to Third Division North club Gateshead, scoring two goals in three appearances before the league was abandoned after the outbreak of World War II. Callender guested for Mansfield Town during World War II.

== Career statistics ==
Appearances and goals by club, season and competition
Club	Season	League			FA Cup		Other		Total	
Club	Season	Division	Apps	Goals	Apps	Goals	Apps	Goals	Apps	Goals
Chesterfield	1934–35	Third Division North	5	1	0	0	0	0	5	1
Lincoln City	1936–37	Third Division North	40	16	3	0	0	0	43	16
Lincoln City	1937–38	Third Division North	35	10	3	0	1	0	39	10
Lincoln City	Total		75	26	6	0	1	0	82	26
Port Vale	1937–38	Third Division South	3	1	0	0	1	0	4	1
Gateshead	1938–39		0	0	0	0	3	2	3	2

== Honours ==
Lincoln City

- Football League Third Division North second-place promotion: 1936–37
