= Jack Roberts (footballer, born 1910) =

English footballer

Personal information
- Full name: John Edgar Roberts
- Date of birth: 15 March 1910
- Place of birth: Anfield, Liverpool, England
- Date of death: 1 June 1985 (aged 75)
- Place of death: Cape Town, South Africa
- Height: 5 ft 8 1/2 in (1.74 m)
- Position: Forward

Youth career
- Marine
- Orrell
- Blundellsands

Senior career*
Years	Team	Apps	(Gls)
- Northern Nomads
1931–1933	Southport	18	(8)
1933–1934	Liverpool	1	(0)
1934–1935	Wigan Athletic	57	(54)
1935–1940	Port Vale	93	(56)

International career
- England amateurs
- * Club domestic league appearances and goals

John Edgar Roberts (15 March 1910 – 1 June 1985) was an English footballer and international baseball player. He had the nickname of "Nipper" Roberts.

A forward, he played amateur football for Marine, Orrell, Blundellsands, and the Northern Nomads. He represented England amateurs before entering the Football League with Southport. He joined Liverpool in May 1933 but left the club the following June after playing just one league game. He spent 18 months with Cheshire League champions Wigan Athletic, scoring 54 goals in 59 league appearances. He returned to the Football League with Port Vale in December 1935. He twice finished as the club's top-scorer and no Football League player scored more league goals than Roberts in the 1937–38 season. He retired as a professional player to serve in the Irish Guards in World War II. He was captured by enemy forces but escaped from captivity to walk 400 miles (640 km) back to Allied territory in 1944.

== Football career ==
=== Early career ===
Roberts played for non-League amateur sides Marine, Orrell, Blundellsands, and Northern Nomads, before signing with professional club Southport. During his amateur days he also represented the England national amateur team. He made his Third Division North debut for Southport on 21 November 1931, in a 1–1 draw with Chester. He scored his first goal in the Football League on 28 January 1933, in a 4–1 win over Crewe Alexandra at Haig Avenue. He played in the 1933 Liverpool Senior Cup final defeat to New Brighton, scoring Southport's goal in the 6–1 loss.

=== Liverpool ===
Roberts signed with First Division giants Liverpool in May 1933 and made his debut on 4 September of that year in a 1–1 draw with Stoke City at the Victoria Ground. That was his only appearance of the Reds' 1933–34 campaign – which was highly disappointing as they narrowly avoided the relegation zone – and he departed Anfield for Cheshire League side Wigan Athletic in June 1934. His single match had some historical significance as he was the only player born in Liverpool to feature for the club that season, maintaining a sequence of local involvement which began in the 19th century and continued well into the 21st century.

=== Wigan Athletic ===
Forming a deadly partnership with Georgie Scott, Roberts proved to be a revelation for Charlie Spencer's "Latics". He scored 46 goals in 42 league games in 1934–35, as Wigan won the Cheshire League title. He also hit six goals in the FA Cup, as the non-League side reached the third round of the competition, where they bowed out with a defeat at Millwall. He added eight goals in 15 league games the following season, but had already ensured himself a return to the Football League.

=== Port Vale ===
He joined Second Division side Port Vale for a large fee in December 1935. He hit 12 goals in 21 appearances in 1935–36, becoming the club's top-scorer despite playing only half of the season. His arrival proved to have come too late, however, and the "Valiants" failed to escape the relegation zone, finishing one point behind Barnsley in 20th place. Roberts nevertheless proved himself to be a forward of some promise, scoring a hat-trick past Hull City in a 4–0 win at the Old Recreation Ground on 2 March, and also finding the net twice at Vetch Field and once at St James' Park.

Roberts was dropped from the first team in November of the 1936–37 season but still scored eight goals in 16 appearances. Vale finished the season in 11th-place in the Third Division North under the stewardship of former England international Warney Cresswell. Cresswell instead favoured a forward partnership of Tom Nolan and Tommy Ward, and also tried Syd Goodfellow in the number ten role.

Cresswell soon left the club for another management post, allowing Roberts to return to the first XI at the start of the 1937–38 campaign. He was once again prolific, scoring 28 league and two FA Cup goals in 40 competitive appearances. This record made him not only Port Vale's top-scorer but also the Football League's joint-highest scorer, along with Everton's Tommy Lawton. During the campaign, Roberts hit all four goals in a home win over Barrow on 25 September, and also hit a hat-trick past Accrington Stanley in a 4–1 home win on 8 January. Despite his exploits in front of goal, Port Vale could only manage a 15th-place finish, and won just one of their 21 away games.

Port Vale were placed in the Third Division South in the 1938–39 season. Roberts scored only ten goals in 21 games, having been forced to miss much of the season after dislocating his shoulder in a 4–0 win over Bristol City on New Year's Eve. The club could only manage an 18th-place finish, they lost six of their next eight games following Roberts's injury, finding the net just four times. Nolan finished as the club's top-scorer with 17 goals, though outside of Nolan and Roberts, there were no players with more than five league goals.

He guested for Wrexham in the autumn of 1939. He left Port Vale for good the following year to fight for the Allies in World War II. He scored 74 goals in 118 competitive games in five years at the club.

== Baseball career ==
Roberts was also a baseball player and captained the England team.

== World War II ==
During the war, Roberts enlisted in the Irish Guards and was captured in Tunisia on 25 March 1943. He managed to escape from an Italian prisoner-of-war camp in November 1943, walking 400 miles (640 km) to freedom with a broken neck.

== Career statistics ==
Appearances and goals by club, season and competition
Club	Season	League			FA Cup		Other		Total	
Club	Season	Division	Apps	Goals	Apps	Goals	Apps	Goals	Apps	Goals
Southport	1931–32	Third Division North	6	0	0	0	0	0	6	0
Southport	1932–33	Third Division North	12	8	1	0	0	0	13	8
Southport	Total		18	8	1	0	0	0	19	8
Liverpool	1933–34	First Division	1	0	0	0	0	0	1	0
Port Vale	1935–36	Second Division	21	12	0	0	0	0	21	12
Port Vale	1936–37	Third Division North	15	8	0	0	1	0	16	8
Port Vale	1937–38	Third Division North	37	28	2	2	1	0	40	30
Port Vale	1938–39	Third Division South	20	8	1	2	0	0	21	10
Port Vale	1939–40		0	0	0	0	2	0	2	0
Port Vale	Total		93	56	3	4	4	0	100	60
