= Richard Fuller (footballer) =

English footballer

Personal information
- Date of birth: 2 March 1913
- Place of birth: Burwell, England
- Date of death: 1983 (aged 69–70)
- Height: 5 ft 10 in (1.78 m)
- Position: Centre-forward

Senior career*
| Years | Team | Apps | (Gls) |
| 1937–1938 | Stockport County | 3 | (1) |
| 1938–1939 | Port Vale | 1 | (0) |
| 1939 | Darlington | 0 | (0) |
| Total | | 4 | (1) |
- * Club domestic league appearances and goals

Richard J. Fuller (2 March 1913 – 1983) was an English footballer who played at centre-forward for Stockport County and Port Vale.

== Career ==
Fuller played for Stockport County before joining Third Division South club Port Vale in May 1938. His only game for the club was on 28 January 1939, in a 2–0 defeat by Mansfield Town at Field Mill. Failing to make an impression at the Old Recreation Ground, he left on a free transfer in April 1939. During the war he guested for Doncaster Rovers and Darlington.

== Career statistics ==
Appearances and goals by club, season and competition
| Club | Season | League | | | FA Cup | | Other | | Total | |
| Club | Season | Division | Apps | Goals | Apps | Goals | Apps | Goals | Apps | Goals |
|---|---|---|---|---|---|---|---|---|---|---|
| Stockport County | 1937–38 | Second Division | 3 | 1 | 0 | 0 | 0 | 0 | 3 | 1 |
| Port Vale | 1938–39 | Third Division South | 1 | 0 | 0 | 0 | 0 | 0 | 1 | 0 |
| Darlington | 1939–40 | | 0 | 0 | 0 | 0 | 3 | 0 | 3 | 0 |
| Career total | | | 4 | 1 | 0 | 0 | 3 | 0 | 7 | 1 |
