= Geoffrey Moreland =

English footballer

Personal information
- Full name: Arthur Geoffrey Moreland
- Date of birth: 29 November 1914
- Place of birth: Wolverhampton, England
- Date of death: 1996 (aged 81–82)
- Height: 6 ft 0 in (1.83 m)
- Position: Centre forward

Senior career*
Years	Team	Apps	(Gls)
- Prestwood Amateurs
- Stafford Rangers
1937–1938	Swindon Town	0	(0)
1938	Birmingham	4	(0)
1938–1939	Port Vale	7	(3)
- * Club domestic league appearances and goals

Arthur Geoffrey Moreland (29 November 1914 – 1996) was an English professional footballer who made 11 appearances in the Football League playing for Birmingham and Port Vale. He played as a centre forward.

Moreland was born in Wolverhampton, Staffordshire. He made his name in non-League football as a target-man with Prestwood Amateurs and Stafford Rangers before deciding to try his luck with Swindon Town. He played just once for Swindon, scoring their goal in a 2–1 defeat to Millwall in the Third Division South Cup. He signed for First Division club Birmingham in the 1938 close season, and made his debut in the opening match of the 1938–39 season, a 2–1 home defeat to Sunderland on 27 August 1938. He kept his place for another couple of games but played only once after that before moving on to Port Vale in November 1938, where he scored three goals in seven league appearances. He departed after war in Europe broke out, most probably in the autumn of 1939.

== Career statistics ==
Appearances and goals by club, season and competition
Club	Season	League			FA Cup		Other		Total	
Club	Season	Division	Apps	Goals	Apps	Goals	Apps	Goals	Apps	Goals
Swindon Town	1937–38	Third Division South	0	0	0	0	1	1	1	1
Birmingham	1938–39	First Division	4	0	0	0	0	0	4	0
Port Vale	1938–39	Third Division South	7	3	0	0	2	0	9	3
