= Thomas Brown Clark =

Scottish painter (1895–1983)

Thomas Brown Clark (1895–1983) was a Scottish painter who worked in oils, pastels and watercolours.

== Life and work ==
T. B. Clark was born in Scotland in 1895, later studying painting at Glasgow School of Art. He exhibited extensively, including at the Royal Academy, the Royal Scottish Academy, and the United Society of Artists. He specialised in coastal views, portraying both the natural beauty of the landscape, and the industry that he found there. He often travelled abroad on painting excursions, finding particular affinity with the landscapes of Ireland and France. By the 1950s Thomas had relocated to Holmsbury St Mary, Surrey in the south of England. He died in 1983.

== Exhibitions ==
The oil painting titled Rue de la Paix, Quimper was exhibited at the Royal Academy, London in 1953.
