= Thomas Clarke (Dean of Barbados) =

Thomas Clarke (c. 1810 – 11 January 1900) was Dean of Barbados from 1886 to 1898.

Clarke graduated from Pembroke College, Cambridge, in 1835, and proceeded to Barbados, where he was ordained in 1836. After curacies at St. John's, Antigua, St Matthias, Barbados, and Christ Church on the same island, he began his long association with the cathedral at Bridgetown, Barbados. He served firstly as its Rector from 1842 (also Rural Dean of Bridgetown 1869–1886) and when Saint Michael's became cathedral church in 1896 he was made Dean, retiring in 1898.

He died at Hastings, Barbados, on 11 January 1900.
