= Tom Nolan (footballer, born 1909) =

English footballer (1909–1969)

Personal information
- Full name: Thomas Gerard Nolan
- Date of birth: 13 June 1909
- Place of birth: Preston, England
- Date of death: 1969 (aged 59–60)
- Height: 5 ft 10 1/2 in (1.79 m)
- Position: Centre-forward

Youth career
- Preston Catholic College

Senior career*
Years	Team	Apps	(Gls)
- Preston North End
- Manchester Central
1931–1935	Port Vale	107	(54)
1935–1936	Bradford Park Avenue	36	(14)
1936–1940	Port Vale	94	(35)
Total		237+	(103+)
- * Club domestic league appearances and goals

Thomas Gerard Nolan (13 June 1909 – 1969) was an English footballer, noted for his powerful cannonball shots. He was Port Vale's most prolific forward of the 1930s.

== Career ==
Nolan played for Preston North End and Manchester Central before joining Port Vale in October 1931. He hit 11 goals in 21 games to become the club's top-scorer, helping the "Valiants" to remain in the Second Division on goal average. Nolan then scored eight goals in 17 appearances in 1932–33, including a hat-trick in a 4–1 win over Plymouth Argyle at the Old Recreation Ground on 29 April.

In the 1933–34 season, he scored 22 goals in 32 appearances, including hat-tricks in home wins over Bury, Hull City, and Nottingham Forest. He was the club's top-scorer for a second successive season in 1934–35, hitting 16 goals in 40 games. However, he was transferred to Bradford Park Avenue in July 1935. He hit 17 goals in 42 league appearances at Park Avenue, before he returned to Port Vale in a trade for George Stabb in September 1936. The "Valiants" had been relegated to the Third Division North in his absence. He hit 12 goals in 41 appearances in 1936–37, including a hat-trick over eventual league champions Stockport County. He was dropped at the start of the 1937–38 campaign in favour of Jack Roberts. However, he still hit the net seven times in his 20 appearances. He hit 17 goals in 41 games in 1938–39 to become the club's top-scorer for a fourth time. In February 1940, Nolan retired from the game due to his war duties.

== Career statistics ==
Appearances and goals by club, season and competition
Club	Season	League			FA Cup		Other		Total	
Club	Season	Division	Apps	Goals	Apps	Goals	Apps	Goals	Apps	Goals
Port Vale	1931–32	Second Division	19	8	2	3	0	0	21	11
Port Vale	1932–33	Second Division	17	8	0	0	0	0	17	8
Port Vale	1933–34	Second Division	32	22	0	0	0	0	32	22
Port Vale	1934–35	Second Division	39	16	1	0	0	0	40	16
Port Vale	Total		107	54	3	3	0	0	110	57
Bradford Park Avenue	1935–36	Second Division	35	14	6	3	0	0	41	17
Bradford Park Avenue	1936–37	Second Division	1	0	0	0	0	0	1	0
Bradford Park Avenue	Total		36	14	6	3	0	0	42	17
Port Vale	1936–37	Third Division North	37	11	1	0	3	1	41	12
Port Vale	1937–38	Third Division North	18	7	1	0	1	0	20	7
Port Vale	1938–39	Third Division South	39	17	2	0	0	0	41	17
Port Vale	Total		94	35	4	0	4	1	102	36
Career total			237	103	13	6	4	1	254	110
