= Joe Wheatley =

English footballer

Personal information
- Full name: Harold Joseph Wheatley
- Date of birth: 9 May 1920
- Place of birth: Eastham, Merseyside, England
- Date of death: November 2014 (aged 94)
- Place of death: Wrexham, Wales
- Height: 5 ft 8 in (1.73 m)
- Position: Right half

Youth career
- 1937–1938: Ellesmere Port Town

Senior career*
Years	Team	Apps	(Gls)
1938–1946	Port Vale	2	(0)
1946–1951	Shrewsbury Town	189	(0)
Total		191	(0)
- * Club domestic league appearances and goals

Harold Joseph Wheatley (9 May 1920 – November 2014) was an English footballer who played for Port Vale and Shrewsbury Town.

== Career ==
Wheatley played for Ellesmere Port Town before joining Port Vale as an amateur in March 1938 and signing as a professional player the following month. He made his debut in a 1–0 defeat at Clapton Orient on 8 September 1938 but only played one more Third Division South game before World War II brought on the cancellation of football and the onset of the war leagues. He played two league and two cup games during the war. Also, he guested for old club Ellesmere Port when Port Vale shut down due to war strains. He returned to Vale in the summer of 1944 as they commenced regular football, only playing the odd game as he also guested for Wrexham, Stockport County and Chester. He was transferred to Shrewsbury Town in the summer of 1946. He made 182 appearances in the Midland League and played in Salop's first seven Football League matches.

== Career statistics ==
Appearances and goals by club, season and competition
Club	Season	League			FA Cup		Other		Total	
Club	Season	Division	Apps	Goals	Apps	Goals	Apps	Goals	Apps	Goals
Port Vale	1938–39	Third Division South	2	0	0	0	1	0	3	0
Shrewsbury Town	1950–51	Third Division North	7	0	0	0	0	0	7	0
