= Thomas Clarke (painter) =

Irish painter

- Occupation: Painter

Thomas Clarke (fl. 1768–1775) was an Irish painter.

== Biography ==
Clarke was a native of Ireland, and received his education in the Academy at Dublin. About 1768 he came to London, and making the acquaintance of Oliver Goldsmith, was by him introduced to Sir Joshua Reynolds, whose pupil he became. He was a clever draughtsman, but had no knowledge of painting, and did not remain long in Reynolds's studio. He seems also to have been of reckless and dissolute habits, which soon brought him into difficulties, and finally to an early grave. In 1769, 1770, and 1775 he exhibited portraits at the Royal Academy.
