= Thomas Clarke (professor) =

British and Australian academic

- Born: Liverpool, UK
- Education: Warwick Business School, Birmingham University
- Awards: Fellow of the Royal Society of Arts
- Scientific career
- Fields: Corporate governance, innovation, sustainability
- Workplaces: Warwick University, Nottingham Trent University, University of St Andrews, China European International Business School (CEIBS), University of Technology Sydney, Toulouse Business School

Thomas Clarke is a British and Australian research professor at the University of Technology Sydney. A life Fellow of the Royal Society of Arts, he served as founder and director of the UTS Centre for Corporate Governance Research Centre (2003–2016), and presently is visiting professor of the Institute for Public Policy and Governance (IPPG) at UTS, and editor of the IPPG Research Policy Papers. Previously he was the head of the School of Management at UTS, the chair of the UTS Academic Board 2009–2010 and a member of the UTS University Council during this period. He is the chair of the Academic Board of OIHE, a higher education institute based in Melbourne and Sydney.

== Research ==
As director of the Key University Research Centre for Corporate Governance at UTS, he led a large inter-disciplinary team of researchers examining international comparative corporate governance. This includes the financial aspects of corporate governance, directors' duties and the role of the board, and legal and ethical aspects of governance, international comparative corporate governance, integrated reporting, corporate social and environmental responsibility and sustainability. He is interested in the critique of shareholder value and the relationship of governance to strategy, innovation, and sustainable value creation.

His broader research interests on which he has published widely include innovation and the knowledge economy, management and business paradigms; globalisation; international best practice in knowledge management; the knowledge economy; privatization and deregulation; management reform in China and SE Asia; sustainable enterprise; stakeholder management; media and communications; new organizational forms; and the governance of knowledge-based business and university governance.

== Selected publications ==
- Clarke, T., Benn, S., and Edwards, M., (2026) "The Routledge Companion to Corporate Sustainability" (2026) London and New York, Routledge
- Clarke, T., O'Brien, J., and O'Kelley, C. (2018) The Oxford Handbook of the Corporation, Oxford University Press. ISBN 978-0198737063
- Clarke, T. and Lee, K. (2018) Innovation in the Asia Pacific: From Manufacturing to Knowledge Economy, Singapore: Springer
- Clarke, T. and Klettner, A. (2018) The Global Financial Crisis and the Regulatory Response, Cambridge University Press (Forthcoming).
- Clarke, T. (2017) International Corporate Governance: A Comparative Approach, London and New York: Routledge
- Clarke, T. and Branson, D. (2012) Handbook of Corporate Governance, London: Sage. ISBN 9781412929806
- Clarke, T. and Chanlat, J-F. (2009) European Corporate Governance, London and New York: Routledge
- Clarke, T. (2005) Critical Perspectives in Business and Management: Corporate Governance Set Volumes 1-5, London: Routledge
- Clarke, T., and dela Rama, M., (2006) Corporate Governance and Globalisation – Set Volume 1-3, London: Sage
- Clarke, T. (2004) Theories of Governance: The Philosophical Foundations of Corporate Governance, London: Routledge
- Clarke, T. and Clegg, S. (2000) Changing Paradigms: The Transformation of Management Knowledge for the 21st Century, London: Harper Collins
- Clarke, T. and E. Monkhouse, (1994) Rethinking the Company, Financial Times-Pitman
- Clarke, T. and Pitelis, C. (2005) The Political Economy of Privatisation, Routledge, London
- Clarke, T., (1994) International Privatisation: Strategies and Practices, Berlin: Walter de Gruyter
