= Richard Fuller (pianist) =

American classical pianist

Richard Fuller (born July 14, 1947) is an American classical pianist and interpreter of the fortepiano repertoire.

== Early life and musical education ==
Born in Washington, Fuller initially studied piano with his mother, Georgette Fuller. After studying piano and musicology at Central Washington University, he went on to receive a master's degree in music from the University of Oregon in 1971. Subsequently, he studied harpsichord and fortepiano in San Francisco, New York and Vienna.

== Life and career ==
Since relocating to Vienna, Austria, over three decades ago, Fuller has emerged as an interpreter of the fortepiano repertoire. He has performed in Vienna's Konzerthaus, Gesellschaft der Musikfreunde in Vienna, Amsterdam's Concertgebouw, London's Wigmore Hall and many other major venues and festivals in Europe, the United States, Japan and Central America. Fuller is one of the few who has sought to address himself exclusively to the interpretive potential of the fortepiano, its subtle sensitivity and delicacy evoking an earlier - in many respects lost - keyboard culture.

Born in the U.S. state of Washington, Fuller studied initially with his mother, later taking degrees in piano and musicology at Central Washington University and the University of Oregon, He studied harpsichord and fortepiano in San Francisco and Vienna. The emphasis of his artistic work lies in the interpretation of the piano, chamber music and the Lied repertoire of the Viennese Classical and early Romantic periods, performed on the fortepiano. His concert work has led him to the musical centers of North America and Europe where he appears as soloist, accompanist and member of numerous chamber music ensembles devoted primarily to the performance of 18th-century music on authentic instruments. In addition he has collaborated with artists James Levine (with the Vienna Philharmonic), Emma Kirkby, Maria Kubizek, Andrew Manze, Klaus Mertens, Dorothea Röschman, Claus Ocker, Wolfgang Holzmair, the Festetics String Quartet (Budapest), Vienna Academy Orchestra, Musica Aeterna Bratislava, and Capella Musicae Graz; live concerts in radio and television, film music, broadcast productions for German Radio (Deutschlandfunk, Cologne), North German Radio (Norddeutscher Rundfunk, Hamburg), Austrian National Radio, BBC and the Hungarian National Radio as well as numerous CD recordings in Germany, Austria, Switzerland and Slovakia. Fuller's discography also includes noted premiere recordings of the piano quartets of Johann Baptist Wanhal with Musica Aeterna Bratislava, the solo piano works of Ignaz Pleyel (1757–1831) and the cycle of 12 piano sonatas of Hyacinthe Jadin (1776–1800).

In 2002, Fuller received from the University of Oregon Distinguished Alumnus Award for his artistic work. In 2006 Fuller initiated and directed the Donaustädter Mozart Projekt, an ongoing series of performances dedicated to the piano music, chamber music and vocal music of Mozart's Vienna years (1781–1791). Other recent projects include recordings of Haydn's piano music on one of Haydn's few known pianos as well as a comprehensive project in 2008 and 2009 in connection with the Haydn Year 2009 of his piano music, vocal music and chamber music.

== Discography ==
Bach, J. S.

- Sonata in G minor for Harpsichord and Flute (D. Johansen) Spectrum
- Studios, Portland, Oregon

Bach, J. C

- Sonata in C major, Op. 18, Nr. l (D. Johansen), Spectrum/Portland, Oregon
- Sonata in C major, Op. 18, Nr. l (T. Pietch) NDR, Hamburg
- Sonata in G major, (T. Pietsch) NDR, Hamburg

Bach, C.P.E.

- Double Concerto in E♭ major for Harpsichord and Fortepiano Wq.47 (Haselboeck, Wiener Akademie) Novalis 150 025-2
- Solo Clavierwerke (Wq. 59, 67) BBC, London
- 5A Sammlung fuer Kenner and Liebhaber Wq. 59; Palatine 9-0202
- Sonata in E minor Wq. 59/i
- Rondo in G major Wq. 59/ii
- Sonata in B♭ major Wq. 59/iii
- Rondo in C minor Wq. 59/iv
- Fantasy in F major Wq. 59/v
- Fantasy in C major Wq. 59/vi

Beethoven, L. van

- Sonata in F major for Piano and Naturhorn, Op. 17; (J. Schroeder) Ambitus 97981
- Serenade in D for piano and flute Op. 41 (D. Johansen); Spectrum/Portland, Oregon
- Rondo in C Major for piano op. 51 Nr. 1; MA 10 98 839
- Scottish Songs op. l08: (Mertens, Sepie, terLinden) MA 98 10 839
- Bonny laddie, highland laddie
- Sympathy
- Oh sweet were the hours
- Faithfu' Johnnie
- Could this ill world have been contriv'd
- The Shepherd's Song
- Oh, had my fate been join'd with thine
- Sunset
- Sally in our alley
- The lovely lass of Inverness
- Polly Stewart
- O Mary, at thy Window be
- The Maid of lsla
- Enchantress, fare well
- Trio in B♭ major for piano, violin and cello WwO 39; (Sepie, terLinden) MA 98 10 839

Danzi, Franz

- Sonata in E♭ major for Piano and Naturhorn, Op. 28; (J. Schroeder) Ambitus 97 981
- DeKrufFt, Mcholas
- Sonata in F major for Piano and Naturhorn; (J. Schroeder) Ambitus 97 981
- Three Preludes and Fugues, WDR, Cologne, BRD

Dussek, J. L.

- Sonata in D major, Op. 31 Nr. 2; MD+G 1252, Detmold, BRD
- The Sufferings of the Queen of France', WDR, Cologne, BRD
- Rondo: My Lodging is in the Cold, ColdGround; MD+G 1252, Detmold, BRD
- Trio in C minor for Piano, Violin and Cello, Op. 31, Nr 7; WDR, Cologne, BRD
- Trio in B♭ major for Piano, Violin and Cello, Op. 21, Nr J; WDR, Cologne, BRD
- Variations for Piano "O ma tendre Mussette", Op. 6; MD+G 1252, Detmold, BRD

Haydn, J.

- Capriccio in G major, Hob. XVÜ/1;M D+G 1252, Detmold, BRD
- Trio in A major for Piano, Violin and Cello Hob. XV/18; Canterino 1021 (Manze, terLinden)
- Trio in G major for Piano, Violin and Cello Hob XV/25 (Die tastrumentisten Wien)
- Sonata in A major, Hob. XVI/28; MD+G 1252, Detmold, BRD
- Variations on "Gott erhalte" Hob. 111/77; MD+G 1252, Detmold, BRD
- Scottish Songs (Voice, piano, violin and cello); Canterino 1021 (Mertens, Manze, terLinden)
- Argyle is my Name Hob XXXi/al71
- Argyle is my Name (instrumental)
- The Blue Bell of Scotland Hob.XXXI/al76
- The Blue Bell of Scotland (instrumental)
- Braw Laos of Gallawater Hob. XXXI/a207
- Fife and all the Lands about it Hob. XXXI/a29
- Haw can I be sad on my wedding day Hob. XXXI/a36
- Killicrankie Hob. XXXI/al69
- Killicrankie (instrumental)
- Maggie Lauder Uob. XXXI/a35
- Maggie Lander (instrumental)
- My Love she 's but a Lassie yet Hob. XXXI/al94
- My Love she 's but a Lassie yet (instrumental)
- Peggy in Devotion Hob.XXXI/a96
- The Ploughman Hob. XXXI/alO
- Saw ye my father Hob. XXXI/a5
- Saw ye my father (instrumental)
- Will ye go to Flanders Hob. XXXI/b47
- Argyle is my Name (instrumental); (T. Pietsch) NDR, Hamburg, BRD
- The Blue Bell of Scotland (instrumental); (T. Pietsch) NDR, Hamburg, BRD
- Killicrankie (instrumental); (T. Pietsch) NDR, Hamburg, BRD
- Maggie Lauder (instrumental); (T. Pietsch) NDR, Hamburg, BRD
- My Love she 's but a Lassie yet (instrumental); (T. Pietsch) NDR, Hamburg, BRD
- Saw ye my father (instrumental);^. Pietsch) NDR, Hamburg, BRD

Kuhlau, Friedrich

- Andante and Polacca in F for Piano and Naturhorn; (J.Schroeder); Ambitus 97 981

Moscheies, Ignaz

- Introduction and Rondo, Op. 63 for Piano and Naturhorn; (J. Schroeder) Ambitus 97 981

Mozart, W.A.

- Adagio in B minor KV 540; Palatino 9-0102
- Early Symphonies KV 43, 45, 48, 73, 74,84; (Vienna Philharmonie, James Levine, cond.) Deutsche Grammophon 431711-2
- Fantasy in D minor KV 397; Palatine 9-0101
- Fantasy in C minor KV 475; Palatine 9-0102
- Quartet in G minor KV 478 for Piano and Strings; (Kertesz, Szüts, Peters) Novalis 150072-2
- Rondo in D major KV 485; Palatine 9-0102
- Rondo in A minor KV 511; Palatine 9-0103
- Sonata in E♭ major KV 282; Palatine 9-0101
- Sonata in G major KV 283; Palatine 9-0101
- Sonata in D major KV 311; Palatine 9-0103
- Sonata in C major KV 330; Palatine 9-0101
- Sonata in A major KV 331; Palatine 9-0103
- Sonata in F major KV 332; Palatine 9-0102
- Sonata in B♭ major KV 333; Palatine 9-0103
- Sonata in C major KV 545; Palatine 9-0101
- Sonata in Bb major KV 570; Palatine 9-0102
- Sonata for Clavier and Violin in G major KV 301; (T. Pietsch) Ambitus 97816; also for NDR, Hamburg, BRD
- Sonata for Clavier and Violin in E♭ major KV 302; (T. Pietsch) Ambitus 97816; also for NDR, Hamburg, BRD
- Sonata for Clavier and Violin in C major KV 303; (T. Pietsch) Ambitus 97816
- Sonata for Clavier and Violin in E minor KV 304; (T. Pietsch) Ambitus 97816

Schubert, F.

- Deutsche Tänze D 783; Preiser 90177
- Deutsche Tänze D 790; Preiser 90177
- Song Cycle: Die schöne Müllerin D795; (Claus Ocker) Ambitus 97 852
- Song Cycle: Die Winterreise D911; (Claus Ocker) Ambitus 97 863

== Awards ==
- University of Oregon School of Music's Distinguished Alumnus, 2002
- Wien-Donaustadt Artist of the Year, 2005
