= Len Dunderdale =

English footballer

Personal information
- Full name: William Leonard Dunderdale
- Date of birth: 6 February 1915
- Place of birth: Willingham-by-Stow, England
- Date of death: 11 January 1989 (aged 73)
- Place of death: Saxilby, England
- Height: 6 ft 0 in (1.83 m)
- Position: Centre forward

Senior career*
Years	Team	Apps	(Gls)
1933–1934	Goole Town	?	(?)
1934–1935	Sheffield Wednesday	?	(?)
1936–1938	Walsall	32	(19)
1938–1939	Watford	30	(18)
1939–1946	Leeds United	?	(?)
1946–1948	Watford	44	(15)
1948–1949	Sittingbourne	?	(?)
- * Club domestic league appearances and goals

William Leonard Dunderdale (6 February 1915 – 11 January 1989) was an English association footballer who played as a centre forward.

== Playing career ==
Born in Lincolnshire, Dunderdale started his career at Goole Town in the East Riding of Yorkshire. He joined Sheffield Wednesday as a 19-year-old amateur in March 1934, turning professional at the end of the season. After being released in June 1935, he joined Walsall the following year. During his first full season for the club, he scored seven goals in one reserve game. In his second, he scored a hat-trick in Walsall's 3–1 win over Watford on 23 October 1937. Dunderdale was sold to Watford in 1938, for a fee of £1,000. His spell at Vicarage Road was a short one; he played 33 games in all competitions, and ended up being the club's top scorer with 21 goals, including a hat-trick in his final game.

However, Dunderdale did not actually finish the season at Watford; in March 1939 the club accepted a £3,750 bid for his services from Leeds United. His competitive Leeds career was cut short by the Second World War. During this time he made wartime appearances for Grimsby Town, Mansfield Town, Lincoln City and Watford. After the war he returned to Watford, although he was less successful than before. He had put on considerable weight, and became unpopular with supporters, eventually being granted a free transfer in 1948. He joined Kent League outfit Sittingbourne for the 1948–49 season, before retiring as a player.

== Later career ==
Following his retirement, Dunderdale fulfilled coaching and scouting roles at various clubs, including Berkhamsted Town, Sun Sports and Watford. He died in Saxilby, Lincolnshire on 11 January 1989, aged 73.
