= Tom Clark (footballer) =

English footballer

Personal information
- Full name: Thomas Clark
- Height: 5 ft 9 in (1.75 m)
- Position: Full-back

Youth career
- Rutherglen Glencairn

Senior career*
Years	Team	Apps	(Gls)
1935–1938	Sunderland	0	(0)
1938–1939	Port Vale	0	(0)
1939	Sunderland	0	(0)
1945–1946	Carlisle United	0	(0)
Total		0	(0)
- * Club domestic league appearances and goals

Thomas Clark was a professional footballer who played as a full-back.

== Playing career ==
Clark was a product of the Scottish amateur side Rutherglen Glencairn, from which he was signed by Sunderland. He spent three years in the Sunderland Reserves before being signed by Port Vale ahead of interest from Fulham.

== Career statistics ==
Appearances and goals by club, season and competition
Club	Season	League			FA Cup		Total	
Club	Season	Division	Apps	Goals	Apps	Goals	Apps	Goals
Port Vale	1938–39	Third Division South	0	0	0	0	0	0
Sunderland	1939–40	–	0	0	0	0	0	0
Carlisle United	1945–46	–	0	0	4	3	4	3
Career total			0	0	4	3	4	3
