= Ken Fish =

South African soccer player

Personal information
- Full name: Kenneth Henry Albert Fish
- Date of birth: 20 February 1914
- Place of birth: Cape Town, South Africa
- Date of death: 4 August 2005 (aged 91)
- Place of death: Stoke-on-Trent, England
- Height: 6 ft 2 3/4 in (1.90 m)
- Position: Forward

Youth career
- Railway Association

Senior career*
Years	Team	Apps	(Gls)
1937	Aston Villa		
1937–1938	Port Vale	5	(1)
1938–1939	Young Boys		
1939	Port Vale	0	(0)

International career
	South Africa	4	

Managerial career
- 1951: Port Vale (caretaker)
- * Club domestic league appearances and goals

Kenneth Henry Albert Fish (20 February 1914 – 4 August 2005) was a South African footballer who played for English club Port Vale and Swiss side Young Boys. He later served behind the scenes at Port Vale, Birmingham City, and Oxford United.

== Playing career ==
Fish played for the Railway Association (in South Africa) before moving to England to play for Aston Villa in January 1937. He had been recommended to manager Jimmy Hogan by Hugo Meisl. He signed with Port Vale of the Third Division North for a sizeable fee in November 1937. He scored his first goal in a 3–1 defeat to Carlisle United at Brunton Park on 20 November. He played just six games (five in the Football League and one FA Cup) and was sold to Swiss side Young Boys in October 1938. He returned to Vale as the assistant trainer in July 1939 and re-signed as a player the following month.

== World War II and post-war coaching career ==
World War II disrupted football in 1939, and as a result, Fish enlisted in the Army in September 1939. He served as a warrant officer and a remedial specialist. He guested for Stafford Rangers during the war and, after its conclusion, was appointed as Port Vale's trainer in July 1946. He was temporarily in control of team affairs in November and December 1951 after Ivor Powell's unsuccessful tenure, winning one game.

In March 1958 he moved on to Birmingham City as trainer-coach, a position he later held at Oxford United. Fish worked at Oxford United for more than twenty years. At the end of the 1986 League Cup final at Wembley, in which Oxford beat QPR 3–0, the manager, Maurice Evans, insisted that Fish go up to the royal box to receive the medal that would usually have gone to the manager.

== Career statistics ==
Appearances and goals by club, season and competition
Club	Season	League			FA Cup		Other		Total	
Club	Season	Division	Apps	Goals	Apps	Goals	Apps	Goals	Apps	Goals
Aston Villa	1936–37	Second Division	0	0	0	0	0	0	0	0
Port Vale	1937–38	Third Division North	5	1	1	0	0	0	6	1
Port Vale	1938–39	Third Division North	0	0	0	0	0	0	0	0
Port Vale	Total		5	1	1	0	0	0	6	1
