= Dennis Higgins (footballer) =

English footballer

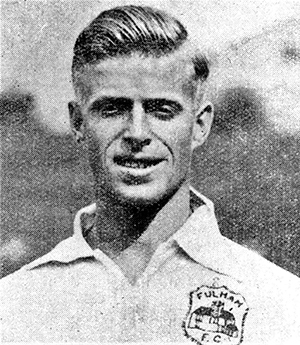
- Higgins in 1938 or 1939

Personal information
- Full name: Dennis Higgins
- Date of birth: 1915
- Place of birth: Wolstanton, England
- Date of death: 25 September 1942 (age 26-27)
- Place of death: British-occupied Egypt
- Position: Forward

Youth career
- 1933–1934: Leek Alexandra

Senior career*
Years	Team	Apps	(Gls)
1934–1935	Tamworth		
1935–1939	Fulham	30	(12)
- * Club domestic league appearances and goals

Dennis Higgins (1915 – 25 September 1942) was an English footballer who played as a forward for Tamworth and Fulham. He was killed in action in World War II.

== Early life ==
Higgins was born at Wolstanton, Staffordshire, son of Michael Joseph Higgins and his wife Mary Jane.

== Career ==
Higgins played for Tamworth and Fulham. During World War II, he appeared as a guest for Port Vale from September 1939 to May 1940, when he was conscripted into the army.

== War service and death ==
Higgins, who served as a private in the 9th battalion Durham Light Infantry, was killed in action in British-occupied Egypt on 25 September 1942, age recorded 26. He left a widow, Nancy, living in Leek, Staffordshire. Having no known grave, he is commemorated on the Alamein Memorial.

== Career statistics ==
Appearances and goals by club, season and competition
Club	Season	League			FA Cup		Other		Total	
Club	Season	Division	Apps	Goals	Apps	Goals	Apps	Goals	Apps	Goals
Fulham	1935–36	Second Division	1	1	0	0	0	0	1	1
Fulham	1936–37	Second Division	1	0	0	0	0	0	1	0
Fulham	1937–38	Second Division	4	1	0	0	0	0	4	1
Fulham	1938–39	Second Division	24	10	2	0	0	0	26	10
Fulham	1939–40		0	0	0	0	2	0	2	0
Fulham	Total		30	12	2	0	2	0	34	12

== See also ==
- List of footballers killed during World War II
