= 1936–37 Port Vale F.C. season =

Port Vale F.C.
1936–37 season
- Chairman: Frank Huntbach
- Manager: Warney Cresswell
- Stadium: Old Recreation Ground
- Football League Third Division North: 11th (44 points)
- FA Cup: Third Round (eliminated by Sheffield Wednesday)
- Football League Third Division North Cup: Semi-finals (eliminated by Chester)
- Top goalscorer: League: Tommy Ward (14); All: Tommy Ward (18)
- Highest home attendance: 12,950 vs. Chester, 5 December 1936
- Lowest home attendance: 2,148 vs. Rochdale, 17 April 1937
- Average home league attendance: 7,298
- Biggest win: 4–0 (twice) and 5–1
- Biggest defeat: 1–7 vs. Mansfield Town, 27 March 1937
Home colours

The 1936–37 season was Port Vale's 31st season of football in the English Football League and their first season (second overall) back in the Third Division North following their relegation from the Second Division. Under newly appointed manager Warney Cresswell, Vale aimed to bounce back at the first attempt, but ultimately finished 11th in the Third Division North with 44 points, well short of promotion contention.

Vale's campaign had its ups and downs — most notably a mid-season unbeaten league run of 13 games between late October and early January, which rallied them near the promotion places before form tapered off in the final third of the season. Their league season peaked with emphatic wins including 5–1 over Mansfield Town, 4–0 over Chester (their largest attendance at home, 12,950), and another 4–0 victory vs. Chester earlier in December.

Leading the attack was Tommy Ward, the club's top scorer with 18 goals in all competitions (14 in the league), delivering a reliable goals return in turbulent times. In the FA Cup, Vale were knocked out in the Third Round — a modest cup run that ended without fanfare. Off the pitch, Warney Cresswell implemented modern training methods — as described in contemporary accounts — including rigorous fitness routines and team bonding activities, as well as making several targeted signings. The integrated strategy helped Vale briefly challenge near the top—but consistency proved elusive, and Cresswell departed at season's end.

Chairman Frank Huntbach.

== Overview ==
=== Third Division North ===
During the pre-season build-up, former England international full-back Warney Cresswell was appointed as manager-coach, filling a position which had remained vacant since September 1936. Described as 'a very knowledgeable man about football', he increased the playing staff to twenty, signing winger Gerry Kelly (Chester); right-half Tommy Ward (Grimsby Town); and left-half Spencer Evans (Altrincham). Cresswell also began running the players and pushing them in the gym, to get them fit for the season. In between heavy training sessions, he encouraged the players to relax with snooker and billiards competitions. The club also decided to introduce a new strip of white shirts and black shorts, a look they retain to this day.

The season opened with two defeats, as Vale found it tough to acclimatize to third-tier football, their 3–1 home defeat to Hull City came despite them doing the double over the "Tigers" the previous season. Following this, George Stabb transferred to Bradford Park Avenue, in a deal which saw Tom Nolan return to the Old Recreation Ground. Nolan scored on his second debut on 12 September, a 2–2 draw at home to Darlington. Two days later, Vale fell to a 5–1 defeat at Oldham Athletic. Continuing their poor form, by the end of September, they had fallen to seventh from bottom. This prompted Cresswell to sign inside-forward Alfred Dickinson from Everton. On 26 September, Nolan scored a hat-trick past Stockport County. Still, the Vale would have to wait a little longer before getting into their stride. Their poor form concluded with a 5–2 defeat at Carlisle United on 17 October, which was in part due to Arthur Caldwell leaving the game injured.

Seven changes were made for the 24 October win over Hartlepools United, and the wait would be worth it, as Vale then went on a 13-game unbeaten run. Nevertheless, Cresswell continued to travel the country in the hunt for talented young amateurs. By the end of October the 40,000 Shilling Fund completed its mission. Michael Curley and George Heywood were judged as surplus to requirements, and moved on to Colwyn Bay and Southport respectively. Fred Obrey also proved to be a revelation in the centre of the pitch. On 21 November, Vale beat Mansfield Town by five goals to one. They held league leaders Chester to a goalless draw seven days later. Vale beat Chester by four clear goals in the return fixture, with Ward claiming a hat-trick. Hull City scored a late equaliser to deny Vale a 1–0 win on Boxing Day. On 2 January, Vale won 4–2 at home to Gateshead to move up to fourth in the table. Vale lost their unbeaten run – 1–0 at struggling Darlington's Feethams.

The Vale were then in indifferent form for the remainder of the season, as their promotion hopes petered away. These hopes were extinguished with three successive defeats starting from 27 February. On 27 March, a heavy 7–1 defeat was recorded to Mansfield Town at Field Mill. Cresswell's contract was cancelled by mutual consent, and he quickly took up the management reins at Third Division South side Northampton Town.

They finished in eleventh position with 44 points. They were 16 points short of promotion and twelve points clear of the re-election zones. With 58 goals scored, they had the third weakest attack in the division and had almost half the tally of runners-up Lincoln City.

=== Finances ===
On the financial side, a profit of £401 was made, though £1,923 of income came through the Shilling Fund. Gate receipts had tailed off by another £1,065, whilst the wage bill was trimmed to £5,656 and a transfer credit of £465 was made. 14 players departed at the season's end, including: Ken Gunn (sold to Creswell's Northampton Town); Eric Hayward (sold to Blackpool); goalkeeper Allan Todd (refused terms and was transferred to Nottingham Forest); 14-year club veteran Roger Jones (retirement); and Gerry Kelly (signed with Southampton). The club also petitioned the Football League for a switch to the Third Division South, where gates were believed to be higher, however, the League replied that circumstance and not applications determined where clubs were placed – despite this Mansfield Town were the ones transferred, Mansfield being a town some 40 miles (64 km) north of Stoke-on-Trent.

=== Cup competitions ===
In the FA Cup, they fell in the third round to First Division Sheffield Wednesday with a 2–0 defeat at Hillsborough, having been forced to play six reserves due to injury. In the short-lived Football League Third Division North Cup, the club progressed to the semi-finals with victories over Mansfield Town (2–0), Stockport County (4–0), and Rotherham United (1–0); where they lost 3–0 to Chester. Attendances of around 100 exemplified the lack of interest in the competition.

== Results ==
=== Football League Third Division North ===
==== League table ====
Pos	Team	Pld	W	D	L	GF	GA	GAv	Pts	Promotion or relegation
9	Mansfield Town	42	18	8	16	91	76	1.197	44	Transferred to the Third Division South
10	Carlisle United	42	18	8	16	65	68	0.956	44	
11	Port Vale	42	17	10	15	58	64	0.906	44	
12	York City	42	16	11	15	79	70	1.129	43	
13	Accrington Stanley	42	16	9	17	76	69	1.101	41	

Source: rsssf.com
Rules for classification: 1) Points; 2) Goal average; 3) Goals scored

==== Results by matchday ====
Round	1	2	3	4	5	6	7	8	9	10	11	12	13	14	15	16	17	18	19	20	21	22	23	24	25	26	27	28	29	30	31	32	33	34	35	36	37	38	39	40	41	42
Ground	H	A	A	H	H	A	A	H	A	H	A	H	A	H	A	H	A	H	A	H	A	A	H	H	A	A	H	A	H	A	H	A	H	A	H	H	A	A	H	H	A	H
Result	L	L	W	W	D	L	L	W	L	D	L	W	D	W	W	W	D	W	D	W	W	D	D	W	L	W	L	L	W	W	W	L	L	L	W	D	L	L	D	D	L	W
Position	18	21	17	9	12	13	16	11	15	14	18	14	13	13	13	9	8	6	6	5	5	5	5	4	5	5	6	6	5	4	4	4	6	5	4	4	6	6	6	7	11	11
Points	0	0	2	4	5	5	5	7	7	8	8	10	11	13	15	17	18	20	21	23	25	26	27	29	29	31	31	31	33	35	37	37	37	37	39	40	40	40	41	42	42	44

Source: Statto
A = Away; H = Home; W = Win; D = Draw; L = Loss

==== Matches ====
29 August 1936 1	Port Vale	1–3	Hull City	Hanley
15:15 BST	Miller	Report	Mayson 8', 65'; Spivey 75'	Stadium: Old Recreation Ground; Attendance: 9,207

2 September 1936 2	New Brighton	2–0	Port Vale	New Brighton, Merseyside
		Report		Stadium: Sandheys Park; Attendance: 4,522

5 September 1936 3	Gateshead	0–1	Port Vale	Gateshead
		Report	Rhodes	Stadium: Redheugh Park; Attendance: 4,538

7 September 1936 4	Port Vale	3–1	New Brighton	Hanley
	Roberts; Rhodes	Report		Stadium: Old Recreation Ground; Attendance: 6,096

12 September 1936 5	Port Vale	2–2	Darlington	Hanley
	Caldwell; Nolan	Report		Stadium: Old Recreation Ground; Attendance: 7,628

14 September 1936 6	Oldham Athletic	5–1	Port Vale	Oldham
		Report	Roberts	Stadium: Boundary Park; Attendance: 3,622

19 September 1936 7	Wrexham	1–0	Port Vale	Wrexham
15:15 BST	Mitchell 39'	Report		Stadium: Racecourse Ground; Attendance: 7,746; Referee: R.S. Warr; Assistant referees: N.L. Smith & H Hartles

26 September 1936 8	Port Vale	3–0	Stockport County	Hanley
	Nolan	Report		Stadium: Old Recreation Ground; Attendance: 9,407; Referee: F Percy

3 October 1936 9	Rotherham United	2–0	Port Vale	Rotherham
		Report		Stadium: Millmoor; Attendance: 7,032

10 October 1936 10	Port Vale	1–1	York City	Hanley
	Caldwell	Report		Stadium: Old Recreation Ground; Attendance: 7,627

17 October 1936 11	Carlisle United	5–2	Port Vale	Carlisle
		Report	Nolan; Rhodes	Stadium: Brunton Park; Attendance: 4,691

24 October 1936 12	Port Vale	1–0	Hartlepools United	Hanley
	Roberts	Report		Stadium: Old Recreation Ground; Attendance: 6,659; Referee: I Caswell

31 October 1936 13	Southport	3–3	Port Vale	Southport
		Report	Roberts; Nolan	Stadium: Ash Lane; Attendance: 7,483

7 November 1936 14	Port Vale	2–1	Tranmere Rovers	Hanley
	Roberts; Nolan	Report		Stadium: Old Recreation Ground; Attendance: 6,551

14 November 1936 15	Halifax Town	0–1	Port Vale	Halifax, West Yorkshire
		Report	Goodfellow	Stadium: The Shay; Attendance: 7,443

21 November 1936 16	Port Vale	5–1	Mansfield Town	Hanley
	Jones; Ward; Dean	Report	Atkinson	Stadium: Old Recreation Ground; Attendance: 8,983

28 November 1936 17	Chester	0–0	Port Vale	Chester
		Report		Stadium: Sealand Road; Attendance: 7,616

5 December 1936 18	Port Vale	4–0	Chester	Hanley
	Ward; Rhodes (pen.)	Report		Stadium: Old Recreation Ground; Attendance: 12,950

12 December 1936 19	Rochdale	0–0	Port Vale	Rochdale
		Report		Stadium: Spotland Stadium; Attendance: 2,218

19 December 1936 20	Port Vale	3–2	Barrow	Hanley
	Nolan; Kelly	Report		Stadium: Old Recreation Ground; Attendance: 8,431

25 December 1936 21	Accrington Stanley	2–3	Port Vale	Accrington
		Report	Ward; Jones	Stadium: Peel Park; Attendance: 5,997

26 December 1936 22	Hull City	1–1	Port Vale	Kingston upon Hull
14:15 GMT	Bell 88'	Report	Ward	Stadium: Anlaby Road; Attendance: 14,928

28 December 1936 23	Port Vale	1–1	Accrington Stanley	Hanley
	Ward	Report		Stadium: Old Recreation Ground; Attendance: 8,030

2 January 1937 24	Port Vale	4–2	Gateshead	Hanley
	Ward; Dean	Report		Stadium: Old Recreation Ground; Attendance: 8,472

9 January 1937 25	Darlington	1–0	Port Vale	Darlington
		Report		Stadium: Feethams; Attendance: 5,177

20 January 1937 26	Crewe Alexandra	0–1	Port Vale	Crewe
		Report	Kelly	Stadium: Gresty Road; Attendance: 2,059

23 January 1937 27	Port Vale	0–3	Wrexham	Hanley
14:45 GMT		Report	Lapham 22'; Lawrence 63'; Burgon 78'	Stadium: Old Recreation Ground; Attendance: 7,432; Referee: R.S. Warr

30 January 1937 28	Stockport County	1–0	Port Vale	Stockport
15:00 GMT	Oxley	Report		Stadium: Edgeley Park; Attendance: 10,690; Referee: F Percy

6 February 1937 29	Port Vale	2–1	Rotherham United	Hanley
	Dean; Rhodes	Report		Stadium: Old Recreation Ground; Attendance: 7,440

13 February 1937 30	York City	1–2	Port Vale	York
		Report	Obrey; Jones	Stadium: Bootham Crescent; Attendance: 4,241

20 February 1937 31	Port Vale	1–0	Carlisle United	Hanley
	Ward	Report		Stadium: Old Recreation Ground; Attendance: 6,585

27 February 1937 32	Hartlepools United	2–0	Port Vale	Hartlepool
	English	Report		Stadium: Victoria Park; Attendance: 2,645; Referee: I Caswell

6 March 1937 33	Port Vale	0–2	Southport	Hanley
		Report		Stadium: Old Recreation Ground; Attendance: 6,986

13 March 1937 34	Tranmere Rovers	4–2	Port Vale	Prenton
		Report	Ward	Stadium: Prenton Park; Attendance: 5,732

20 March 1937 35	Port Vale	3–1	Halifax Town	Hanley
	Jones	Report		Stadium: Old Recreation Ground; Attendance: 8,815

26 March 1937 36	Port Vale	1–1	Lincoln City	Hanley
	Dean	Report		Stadium: Old Recreation Ground; Attendance: 6,243

27 March 1937 37	Mansfield Town	7–1	Port Vale	Mansfield
	Anderson; Harston; Wood	Report	Jones	Stadium: Field Mill; Attendance: 6,348

29 March 1937 38	Lincoln City	1–0	Port Vale	Lincoln
		Report		Stadium: Sincil Bank; Attendance: 13,715

3 April 1937 39	Port Vale	0–0	Crewe Alexandra	Hanley
		Report		Stadium: Old Recreation Ground; Attendance: 6,365

17 April 1937 40	Port Vale	1–1	Rochdale	Hanley
	Nolan	Report	Hunt	Stadium: Old Recreation Ground; Attendance: 2,148

24 April 1937 41	Barrow	3–1	Port Vale	Barrow-in-Furness
		Report	Nolan	Stadium: Holker Street; Attendance: 4,298

1 May 1937 42	Port Vale	1–0	Oldham Athletic	Hanley
	Roberts	Report		Stadium: Old Recreation Ground; Attendance: 2,353

=== FA Cup ===
16 January 1937 R3	Sheffield Wednesday	2–0	Port Vale	Owlerton
	Drury; Robinson	Report		Stadium: Hillsborough Stadium; Attendance: 27,450

=== Third Division North Cup ===
11 November 1936 R1	Mansfield Town	0–2	Port Vale	Mansfield
			Ward	Stadium: Field Mill; Attendance: 1,000

8 February 1937 R2	Port Vale	4–0	Stockport County	Hanley
	Ward; Evans (pen.); Tunnicliffe			Stadium: Old Recreation Ground; Attendance: 100+

8 March 1937 R3	Port Vale	1–0	Rotherham United	Hanley
	Nolan			Stadium: Old Recreation Ground; Attendance: 1,000

10 April 1937 Semi-final	Chester	3–0	Port Vale	Chester
				Stadium: Sealand Road

== Squad statistics ==
=== Appearances and goals ===
Key to positions: GK – Goalkeeper; FB – Full back; HB – Half back; FW – Forward

No.	Pos	Nat	Player	Total		Third Division North		FA Cup		Third Division North Cup	
No.	Pos	Nat	Player	Apps	Goals	Apps	Goals	Apps	Goals	Apps	Goals
	GK	(Scotland) SCO	Allan Todd	43	0	39	0	0	0	4	0
	FB	(England) ENG	George Heywood	2	0	2	0	0	0	0	0
	FB	(England) ENG	Bill Wright	0	0	0	0	0	0	0	0
	HB	(England) ENG	Edwin Blunt	0	0	0	0	0	0	0	0
	HB	(Wales) WAL	Spencer Evans	38	1	34	0	1	0	3	1
	HB	(England) ENG	Harry Griffiths	8	0	8	0	0	0	0	0
	HB	(Scotland) SCO	Ken Gunn	40	0	37	0	0	0	3	0
	HB	(England) ENG	Eric Hayward	21	0	18	0	1	0	2	0
	HB	(England) ENG	Roger Jones	39	9	36	9	1	0	2	0
	HB	(England) ENG	Fred Obrey	33	1	29	1	1	0	3	0
	HB	(England) ENG	Trevor Rhodes	36	5	33	5	0	0	3	0
	HB	(England) ENG	Tommy Ward	32	18	27	14	1	0	4	4
	FW	(England) ENG	Percy Adams	1	0	1	0	0	0	0	0
	FW	(England) ENG	Arthur Caldwell	14	2	13	2	0	0	1	0
	FW	(England) ENG	Arthur Cumberlidge	9	0	8	0	0	0	1	0
	FW	(England) ENG	Luke Dean	14	4	13	4	0	0	1	0
	FW	(England) ENG	Arthur Ford	4	0	3	0	0	0	1	0
	FW	(England) ENG	Gerry Kelly	21	2	20	2	1	0	0	0
	FW	(England) ENG	Tom Nolan	41	12	37	11	1	0	3	1
	FW	(England) ENG	Jack Roberts	16	8	15	8	0	0	1	0
	FW	(England) ENG	Billy Tunnicliffe	4	0	2	0	0	0	2	0
Players who featured but departed the club during the season:
	GK	(Wales) WAL	John Jones	4	0	3	0	1	0	0	0
	FB	(England) ENG	Claude Barrett	19	0	19	0	0	0	0	0
	FB	(England) ENG	Roderick Welsh	21	0	17	0	1	0	3	0
	HB	(England) ENG	Michael Curley	3	0	3	0	0	0	0	0
	HB	(England) ENG	Wilf Smith	1	0	1	0	0	0	0	0
	FW	(Wales) WAL	Alfred Dickinson	5	0	5	0	0	0	0	0
	FW	(England) ENG	Syd Goodfellow	16	1	16	1	0	0	0	0
	FW	(England) ENG	Jack Harrison	4	0	2	0	0	0	2	0
	FW	(Scotland) SCO	Peter Miller	17	1	13	1	1	0	3	0
	FW	(England) ENG	Frank Ryder	8	0	6	0	1	0	1	0
	FW	(England) ENG	George Stabb	2	0	2	0	0	0	0	0

=== Top scorers ===
Place	Position	Nation	Name	Third Division North	FA Cup	Northern Cup	Total
1	HB	England	Tommy Ward	14	0	4	18
2	FW	England	Tom Nolan	11	0	1	12
3	HB	England	Roger Jones	9	0	0	9
4	FW	England	Jack Roberts	8	0	0	8
5	HB	England	Trevor Rhodes	5	0	0	5
6	FW	England	Luke Dean	4	0	0	4
7	FW	England	Arthur Caldwell	2	0	0	2
–	FW	England	Gerry Kelly	2	0	0	2
8	FW	Scotland	Peter Miller	1	0	0	1
–	FW	England	Syd Goodfellow	1	0	0	1
–	FW	England	Billy Tunnicliffe	0	0	1	1
–	HB	England	Fred Obrey	1	0	0	1
–	HB	Wales	Spencer Evans	0	0	1	1
			TOTALS	58	0	7	65

== Transfers ==
=== Transfers in ===
Date from	Position	Nationality	Name	From	Fee	Ref.
May 1936	FW	ENG	Jack Harrison	Sneyd Colliery	Free transfer	
June 1936	FB	ENG	Claude Barrett	Bradford Park Avenue	Free transfer	
June 1936	FW	ENG	Gerry Kelly	Chester	'Substantial'	
June 1936	FW	SCO	Peter Miller	Rotherham United	Free transfer	
June 1936	HB	ENG	Tommy Ward	Grimsby Town	Free transfer	
July 1936	HB	WAL	Spencer Evans	Altrincham	Free transfer	
August 1936	FW	ENG	Arthur Ford	Wolverhampton Wanderers	Free transfer	
September 1936	FW	WAL	Alfred Dickinson	Everton	Free transfer	
September 1936	FW	ENG	Tom Nolan	Bradford Park Avenue	Exchange	
October 1936	FW	ENG	Syd Goodfellow	Silverdale	Free transfer	

=== Transfers out ===
Date from	Position	Nationality	Name	To	Fee	Ref.
September 1936	HB	ENG	George Stabb	Bradford Park Avenue	Free transfer	
October 1936	FW	WAL	Alfred Dickinson	Everton	Free transfer	
October 1936	HB	ENG	Wilf Smith	Sneyd Colliery	Free transfer	
November 1936	HB	ENG	Michael Curley	Colwyn Bay	Free transfer	
November 1936	FB	ENG	Roderick Welsh	Southport	Free transfer	
April 1937	FB	ENG	Claude Barrett	York City	Free transfer	
April 1937	FW	ENG	Syd Goodfellow	(Northern Ireland) Glentoran	Free transfer	
April 1937	FW	ENG	Jack Harrison		Released	
April 1937	GK	WAL	John Jones	Northampton Town	Free transfer	
April 1937	FW	SCO	Peter Miller		Released	
April 1937	FW	ENG	Frank Ryder		Released	
May 1937	HB	SCO	Ken Gunn	Northampton Town	Free transfer	
May 1937	HB	ENG	Eric Hayward	Blackpool	Free transfer	
Summer 1937	HB	ENG	Roger Jones		Released	
Summer 1937	GK	SCO	Allan Todd	Nottingham Forest	Exchange	
August 1937	FW	ENG	Luke Dean	Northwich Victoria	Free transfer	
August 1937	FW	ENG	Gerry Kelly	Southampton	Free transfer	
