= Warney Cresswell =

English footballer (1897–1973)

Personal information
- Full name: Warneford Cresswell
- Date of birth: 5 November 1897
- Place of birth: South Shields, County Durham, England
- Date of death: 20 October 1973 (aged 75)
- Place of death: South Shields, Tyne and Wear, England
- Height: 5 ft 9 in (1.75 m)
- Position: Full back

Senior career*
Years	Team	Apps	(Gls)
- Morton
- Heart of Midlothian
- Hibernian
1919–1922	South Shields	99	(0)
1922–1927	Sunderland	182	(0)
1927–1936	Everton	290	(1)
Total		571	(1)

International career
1911	England Schoolboys	1	(0)
1921–1929	England	7	(0)

Managerial career
- 1936–1937: Port Vale
- 1937–1939: Northampton Town
- 1946–1947: Dartford
- * Club domestic league appearances and goals

Warneford Cresswell (5 November 1897 – 20 October 1973) was an English international footballer who was described as "The Prince of Full Backs" for his renowned tackling and positional skills in the right-back position. In a 17-year career in the English Football League he made 571 league appearances, and won seven caps for England.

He began his career during World War I, playing in the Scottish Football League with Morton, Heart of Midlothian and Hibernian, before signing with English Second Division club South Shields in 1919. Three years later, he moved into the First Division when he was bought by Sunderland for a world-record fee of £5,500. He made 190 league and cup appearances and helped the "Black Cats" to a second-place finish in 1922–23 before moving on to Everton for £7,000 in 1927. He helped the "Toffees" to win the English Football League championship in 1927–28 and 1931–32, the Second Division championship in 1930–31, the FA Cup in 1933, and the FA Community Shield in 1928 and 1932.

He turned to management with Port Vale in May 1936 and moved on to Northampton Town twelve months later. He later managed Dartford. He has also been credited with the quote: "Good goalkeepers never make great saves".

== Early and personal life ==
Warneford Cresswell was born on 5 November 1897 in South Shields, County Durham. He was the third of five children to Warneford and Charlotte; his father was a marine engineer. His brother, Frank, also played for Sunderland as well as clubs including West Bromwich Albion, Chester and Notts County.

He married Grace H.C. Erikson in 1924, with whom he had one daughter, Audrey (born 1925), and one son, Corbett (1932-2017). Corbett was in the Bishop Auckland team which won the FA Amateur Cup three years in succession in the 1950s. His great-granddaughter is Lincoln-based Olympic swimmer Kate Haywood. After retiring from football, Cresswell went on to manage a pub in the Sunderland area.

== Club career ==
=== Early career ===
Cresswell was born in South Shields, Tyne and Wear (then in County Durham). He represented South Shields Schools and England Schools as a youngster and played junior football locally. However, the outbreak of World War I prevented him from playing professional football in England, where football was suspended. However, this was not the case in Scotland, where the Scottish Football League continued throughout the hostilities. Hence, the teenage Cresswell moved north of the border to play for Morton, Heart of Midlothian and Hibernian. He also guested for Tottenham Hotspur. He later enlisted in the army, and was captured and held in a prisoner-of-war camp before being repatriated at the end of the war.

=== South Shields ===
In the summer of 1919 he signed for South Shields, then playing in the Second Division. He played for the club in 1919–20, their first season in English Football League, when they finished in ninth place. They finished eighth in 1920–21, and sixth in 1921–22, just six points short of promoted Stoke. In all, he played 104 league and cup matches for the club.

=== Sunderland ===
In 1922, he moved to Sunderland, when manager-secretary Bob Kyle authorised a then-world record fee of £5,500. The record was not broken again until Bob Kelly joined him at Sunderland for £6,500 in December 1925. The Black Cats finished as First Division runners-up in 1922–23, six points behind champions Liverpool. They came closer to the title in 1923–24 despite finishing third, as they ended up four points behind champions Huddersfield Town. They then dropped to seventh in 1924–25 before another third-place finish in 1925–26; in the latter campaign, they were nine points behind first placed Huddersfield Town. His last full campaign at Roker Park, 1926–27, ended up with Sunderland again in third place, seven points behind rivals Newcastle United. He made a total of 190 appearances for the club in league and cup competitions.

=== Everton ===
He moved to Everton in 1927 for £7,000, at the age of 30, where he played alongside goal machine Dixie Dean. He won the league title in 1927–28, his first season at Goodison Park. They then won the subsequent Charity Shield in 1928, before finishing a disappointing 18th in 1928–29, just three places above the drop. Everton then finished bottom of the division in 1929–30, though were just one point behind third-from-bottom (and therefore not relegated) Sheffield United. The "Toffees" made an immediate return to the top flight, marching to the Second Division title in 1930–31, seven points ahead of runners-up West Bromwich Albion; they scored 121 goals in their 42 league games. They continued their success into the First Division, winning the title in 1931–32 after finishing two points ahead of Arsenal. Their success continued in the Charity Shield in 1932, as they beat Newcastle United 5–3 at St James' Park. They dropped to eleventh in 1932–33, but lifted the FA Cup in 1933. The final, held in front of 92,950 spectators at Wembley, finished in a 3–0 victory over Manchester City, and the Manchester Guardian described Cresswell as giving "an almost perfect display". The club's final two seasons under manager-secretary Thomas H. McIntosh ended with a whimper however, with a 14th-place finish in 1933–34 and an eighth-place finish in 1934–35. Theo Kelly led Everton to a 16th-place finish in 1935–36, Cresswell's last as a professional footballer. Retiring at the age of 38, having made 306 appearances for the club, after his death, he was inaugurated into the Gwladys Street's Hall of Fame.

== International career ==
Cresswell was capped for England seven times. His first match was against Wales on 14 March 1921, and his last was against Ireland on 19 October 1929. His first appearance was whilst still at South Shields, thus making him South Shield's only England international.

== Style of play ==
Cresswell played in the right-back position. He was a renowned tackler and famed for his cool demeanour, fine tackling and masterful positional play. He became hugely popular with fans wherever he played, establishing a reputation as a 'gentleman' on and off the pitch. He has been described during his Everton days as: "A stylish English fullback, who made 'modern' runs forward and usually stole the ball from the opposition with skilful rather than crude tackling". One player recounted how his leg was broken following a collision with Cresswell, who appeared later at the hospital with a pouch of smoking tobacco, which at the time was probably considered more manly than flowers or a bag of grapes.

== Managerial career ==
=== Port Vale ===
After retiring as a player, Cresswell was appointed manager-coach of Port Vale in May 1936. He introduced strict training methods to the club, the emphasis being on fitness, using activities such as running and gymnastics. These were combined with relaxed sessions of snooker and billiards. The "Valiants" were in the Third Division North, and had spent the majority of the 1935–36 season without a manager. He signed winger Gerry Kelly from Chester; right-half Tommy Ward from Grimsby Town; and left-half Spencer Evans from Altrincham. He also traded George Stabb to Bradford Park Avenue for Tom Nolan. Results began poorly, and so Cresswell signed inside-forward Alfred Dickinson from Everton. Vale then became hard to beat, and remained undefeated for 13 matches between 24 October and 2 January, with central player Fred Obrey proving to be a revelation. The team were in fourth place at the turn of the year. However, results then tailed off, and Cresswell left the club after the campaign ended with an eleventh-place finish.

=== Northampton Town ===
His professional manner seemed to indicate a bright future as a manager. In May 1937, he took up the management position at Northampton Town, later being the manager-secretary. He instigated a policy of promoting young players at the County Ground; this came at the expense of established players such as striker Jack Haycox, who was transfer-listed at an asking price of £250. Under his stewardship the "Cobblers" finished ninth in the Third Division South in 1937–38 and 17th in 1938–39. In 1947, he was on a shortlist of 10 for the post of manager at Newcastle United. Instead, he took up the position at Dartford, resigning after a poor run of results.

== Career statistics ==
=== Club ===
Appearances and goals by club, season and competition
Club	Season	League			FA Cup		Other		Total	
Club	Season	Division	Apps	Goals	Apps	Goals	Apps	Goals	Apps	Goals
South Shields	1919–20	Second Division	34	0	2	0	0	0	36	0
South Shields	1920–21	Second Division	38	0	2	0	0	0	40	0
South Shields	1921–22	Second Division	27	0	1	0	0	0	28	0
South Shields	Total		99	0	5	0	0	0	104	0
Sunderland	1921–22	First Division	12	0	0	0	0	0	12	0
Sunderland	1922–23	First Division	38	0	2	0	0	0	40	0
Sunderland	1923–24	First Division	32	0	1	0	0	0	33	0
Sunderland	1924–25	First Division	38	0	0	0	0	0	38	0
Sunderland	1925–26	First Division	37	0	4	0	0	0	41	0
Sunderland	1926–27	First Division	25	0	1	0	0	0	26	0
Sunderland	Total		182	0	8	0	0	0	200	0
Everton	1926–27	First Division	15	0	0	0	0	0	15	0
Everton	1927–28	First Division	36	0	2	0	0	0	38	0
Everton	1928–29	First Division	32	1	1	0	1	0	34	1
Everton	1929–30	First Division	30	0	0	0	0	0	30	0
Everton	1930–31	Second Division	42	0	5	0	0	0	47	0
Everton	1931–32	First Division	40	0	0	0	0	0	40	0
Everton	1932–33	First Division	41	0	6	0	1	0	48	0
Everton	1933–34	First Division	25	0	1	0	0	0	26	0
Everton	1934–35	First Division	25	0	1	0	0	0	26	0
Everton	1935–36	First Division	4	0	0	0	0	0	4	0
Everton	Total		290	1	16	0	2	0	308	1
Career total			571	1	29	0	2	0	602	1

=== International ===
Appearances and goals by national team and year
National team	Year	Apps	Goals
England	1921	1	0
England	1923	2	0
England	1924	1	0
England	1926	2	0
England	1929	1	0
Total		7	0

=== Managerial ===
Managerial record by team and tenure
Team	From	To	Record				
Team	From	To	P	W	D	L	Win %
Port Vale	31 May 1936	31 May 1937	47	20	10	17	42.6
Northampton Town	31 May 1937	30 September 1939	94	34	19	41	36.2
Total			141	54	29	58	38.3

== Honours ==
Professionals

- FA Charity Shield: 1923

Everton

- Football League First Division: 1927–28, 1931–32
- Football League Second Division: 1930–31
- FA Cup: 1932–33
- FA Charity Shield: 1928, 1932

England

- British Home Championship 1926–27 (shared), 1929–30
