= Kenneth Cameron =

Kenneth Cameron may refer to:

- Kenneth D. Cameron (born 1949), former NASA astronaut
- Kenneth Cameron, Baron Cameron of Lochbroom (born 1931), retired Scottish judge
- Kenneth Cameron (toponymist) (1922–2001), British toponymist and academic
- Ken Cameron (trade unionist) (1941–2016), Scottish trade union leader
- Thom Latimer, English professional wrestler who wrestled as Kenneth Cameron in WWE
- Ken Cameron (born 1946), Australian film and television director
- Ken Cameron (Australian footballer) (1934–2005), Australian rules footballer
- Ken Cameron (Scottish footballer) (1906–1974)
- Kenny Cameron (born 1943), Scottish footballer and football coach, scout, and manager
- Kenneth Neill Cameron (1908–1994), British-born literary scholar
