= Cliff Birks =

English footballer (1910–1998)

Personal information
- Full name: Clifford Birks
- Date of birth: 13 December 1910
- Place of birth: Hanley, England
- Date of death: 1998 (aged 87–88)
- Height: 5 ft 10 in (1.78 m)
- Positions: Right-half; outside right

Youth career
- Stoke St. Peters
- Stoke City

Senior career*
Years	Team	Apps	(Gls)
1929–1936	Port Vale	58	(7)
1936–1937	Torquay United	1	(1)
1937–1938	Halifax Town	2	(0)
Total		61	(8)
- * Club domestic league appearances and goals

Clifford Birks (born 13 December 1910 – 1998) was an English professional footballer who played as both a right-half and at outside-right for Stoke City, Port Vale, Torquay United and Halifax Town in the 1930s.

== Career ==
=== Port Vale ===
Birks played for Stoke St. Peters and Stoke City, before joining Port Vale in November 1929. He made his debut on 27 December 1932, in a 2–1 win over Charlton Athletic at the Old Recreation Ground, and made 21 Second Division appearances and one FA Cup appearance in the 1932–33 season. He featured 11 times in the 1933–34 and 1934–35 campaigns, scoring four goals in the last five games of the 1934–35 season. He scored three goals in 15 league games in the 1935–36 season, finding himself on the score-sheet against Tottenham Hotspur at White Hart Lane, but was released in May 1936.

=== Later career ===
He joined Torquay United of the Third Division South. He was kept out of the side due to the form of Fred Beedall and George Daniels in the 1936–37 campaign; Birks made his "Gulls" debut at Plainmoor on 16 January 1937, scoring in the 4–1 defeat to Southend United. However, this was to be his only appearance for Torquay, and he left to join Halifax Town for the following season. He played just three Third Division North games for Halifax before leaving both The Shay and the English Football League. During the war he guested for Leicester City.

== Career statistics ==
Appearances and goals by club, season and competition
Club	Season	League			FA Cup		Other		Total	
Club	Season	Division	Apps	Goals	Apps	Goals	Apps	Goals	Apps	Goals
Port Vale	1932–33	Second Division	21	0	1	0	0	0	22	0
Port Vale	1933–34	Second Division	11	0	0	0	0	0	11	0
Port Vale	1934–35	Second Division	11	4	0	0	0	0	11	4
Port Vale	1935–36	Second Division	15	3	0	0	0	0	15	3
Port Vale	Total		58	7	1	0	0	0	59	7
Torquay United	1936–37	Third Division South	1	1	0	0	1	0	2	1
Halifax Town	1937–38	Third Division North	2	0	0	0	0	0	2	0
Career total			61	8	1	0	1	0	63	8
