= Adam Mitchell =

Adam Mitchell may refer to:

- Adam Mitchell (footballer, born 1908), Scottish professional footballer for Bradford City and Wrexham
- Adam Mitchell (footballer, born 1993), English professional footballer for Sunderland
- Adam Mitchell (footballer, born 1996), New Zealand footballer
- Adam Mitchell (Doctor Who), a fictional character in the British science fiction television series Doctor Who
- Adam Mitchell (golfer) (born 1987), American golfer
- Adam Mitchell (ice hockey) (born 1982), Canadian ice hockey player
- Adam Mitchell (songwriter) (born 1944), singer-songwriter
