= 1935–36 Port Vale F.C. season =

Port Vale F.C.
1935–36 season
- Chairman: Frank Huntbach
- Manager: Tom Holford (until September)
- Stadium: Old Recreation Ground
- Football League Second Division: 21st (32 points)
- FA Cup: Fourth Round (eliminated by Grimsby Town)
- Top goalscorer: League: Jack Roberts (12); All: Jack Roberts (12)
- Highest home attendance: 16,677 vs. Sunderland, 13 January 1936
- Lowest home attendance: 2,669 vs. Hull City, 2 March 1936
- Average home league attendance: 7,787
- Biggest win: 4–0 vs. Hull City, 2 March 1936
- Biggest defeat: 0–7 and 2–9
Home colours

The 1935–36 season was Port Vale's 30th season of football in the English Football League, and their sixth-successive season (29th overall) in the Second Division. Under manager Tom Holford (until his dismissal during the season), the Valiants endured a disastrous campaign, finishing 21st in the Second Division with just 32 points, and suffering relegation — their second in club history, ultimately ending a six-year stay in the second tier. A principal factor was defence: Vale conceded a league‑record 106 goals in 42 matches, marking the most goals ever allowed in a single season by the club. Away form was particularly poor, as the team picked up only five points on the road and endured a run of twelve defeats in sixteen games between September and January.

Individual highlights included centre‑forward Jack Roberts, who scored 12 goals in 21 appearances and finished as both league and season top scorer for Vale. In the FA Cup, the club achieved a celebrated upset by defeating reigning First Division champions Sunderland, before ultimately exiting in the Fourth Round. Off the field, financial woes were severe. A public appeal raised emergency funds—supporters were asked to raise over £2,000 to keep the club afloat—while manager Holford was relieved of his duties amid the crisis.

The season had been disastrous,a record number of goals were conceded and relegation after years of stability. But, tempered by a cup performance against top-flight opposition.

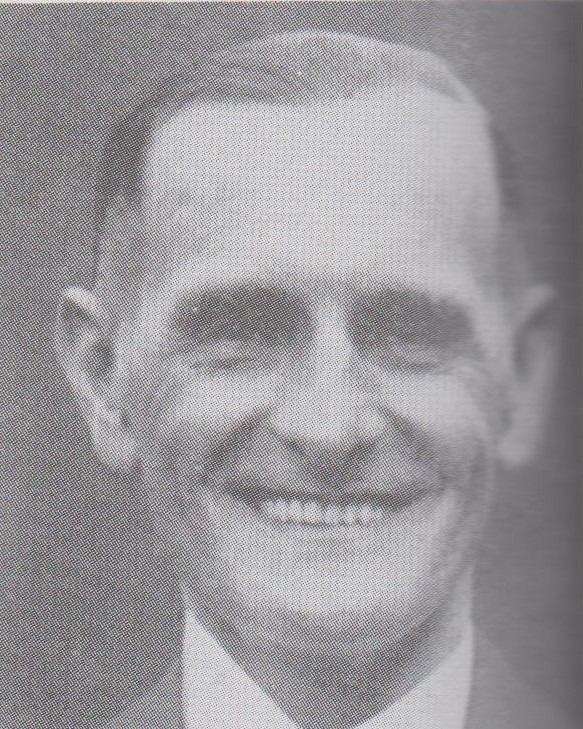
Manager Tom Holford became just a scout in September.

Chairman Frank Huntbach.

== Overview ==
=== Second Division ===
The pre-season began with the sale of top-scorer Tom Nolan to Bradford Park Avenue, whilst manager Tom Holford heralded a youth policy. Ten new faces replaced the 14 retained from the previous season, these included: free-scoring striker George Stabb (Notts County), centre-half Harry Griffiths (Everton), left-winger Arthur Caldwell (Winsford United), left-back Roderick Welsh (Portsmouth), and right-half Michael Curley (Manchester City).

The season started with what would ultimately turn out to be a relegation decider, Vale lost 4–2 to Barnsley at Oakwell, with the "Tykes" scoring twice in the last ten minutes. Still switching the team regularly to find a favourite eleven, the "Valiants" then picked up eight points from their next six games to move into eighth in the table. This run included wins over Plymouth Argyle, Charlton Athletic and Newcastle United at the Old Recreation Ground. On 28 September, the defence was ripped apart with a 5–2 defeat to Tottenham Hotspur at White Hart Lane. A further four defeats and 13 goals conceded followed, resulting in manager Tom Holford being relieved of his management duties to revert to a scouting role. Relief for Vale came on 2 November, with a hard-pushed 3–2 win over Bradford Park Avenue.

Vale's poor form continued with five defeats and two draws in seven games. In November, Fred Mitcheson was sold to Plymouth to raise funds for new players. George Heywood was promptly signed from Altrincham for £250. Heywood made his debut on 23 November, as Vale suffered a 9–2 demolition at the City Ground to Nottingham Forest. Forest were only kept from double figures by 'many fine saves' from Potts. On 7 December, a 2–0 loss at Belle Vue from Doncaster Rovers sent Vale to the foot of the table. As a result of this, the club put in a large bid for Wigan Athletic's Jack Roberts, and consequently signed the highly promising forward. Meanwhile, injuries and constant rotation of the first XI worked against the team. A 4–0 defeat from West Ham United at Upton Park on 21 December was followed by the club's first away win in 16 attempts five days later. The win came over a poor Hull City side in ankle deep mud. Two days later, Barnsley beat Vale 4–0 at "The Rec", which would again have fatal consequences come May.

Following their FA Cup heroics, the Vale recorded a 2–1 victory over Bradford City on 18 January. They then lost 5–1 at home to "Spurs", earned a point at St James' Park, and then were humiliated 7–2 at Old Trafford. Three home wins followed, the last of which was a 4–0 win over doomed Hull City in front of a mere 2,669 supporters. This removed them from the relegation zone. However, on 27 March an extraordinary shareholders meeting was called at the Grand Hotel (Hanley), in which the net weekly income was revealed to be just £181. The directors claimed they were no longer prepared to prop the club up financially, and demanded the supporters raise £2,000 to keep the club afloat. A subsequent public meeting launched a 40,000 Shilling Fund, and a benefit match with cross-city rivals Stoke City raised £528 – helping to ensure the survival of Port Vale.

Two points clear of relegation on 4 April despite losing 5–0 at Bury, it was expected that Vale would be safe. A win over Fulham and a draw with Sheffield United reinforced such expectations. However, on 13 April, they travelled to Craven Cottage, where they were beaten 7–0. Two further defeats meant victory on the final day encounter with Charlton Athletic at The Valley was needed – the "Addicks" needed a point themselves to ensure promotion. 27,778 spectators witnessed Charlton take the lead, a lead wiped out by a Caldwell equaliser on 83 minutes. The team's valiant efforts were futile in any case, as other results went against them.

They finished in 21st place with 32 points. Their 106 goals conceded gave them the fourth worst defensive record in the Football League. Jack Roberts' twelve goals in 21 games were impressive, but not enough to help the club beyond a tally of 56 goals scored.

=== Finances ===
On the financial side, a loss of £1,046 was made on the season. Income was supplemented by the £1,800 raised from the Shilling Fund. Gross gate receipts were down to just £9,226, whilst a strict control over wages saw a wage bill of just £6,937. The transfer credit stood at £1,640. 15 players were released, the most significant of which were George Shenton, John Potts, Jack Vickers, and James Baker.

=== FA Cup ===
In contrast to their league form, Vale performed well in the FA Cup. Pitted against eventual First Division champions Sunderland at Roker Park, their top player, Roberts cup-tied, a heavy defeat seemed likely. Vale were managerless and in poor form, and though took a half-time lead through Stabb, they had to rely on an 88th-minute equalizer from Caldwell to force a replay. The highest crowd of the season then witnessed a 2–0 victory at the "Rec" two days later as the "Valiants" "defended brilliantly". The Sentinel's Placer suggested it to be 'the greatest victory in the history of the club'. Stabb put the Vale ahead after five minutes as he connected to a Curley free-kick and the lead was doubled on 24 minutes when Trevor Rhodes capitalised on a miskicked clearance. Raich Carter struck the ball with such force that it knocked Griffiths unconscious as he blocked it on the goalline and late in the match Len Duns rolled an effort past the far post, whilst Vale almost added a third when Baker forced goalkeeper Jimmy Thorpe into making the save of the match. In the Fourth Round, First Division Grimsby Town would advance with a 4–0 victory in the snow. Before the match, the teams paid their respects to the recently deceased George V with Abide with Me, during which the "Mariners" wore overcoats as the Vale players shivered – this was the excuse used to justify their conceding four first-half goals.

== Results ==
=== Football League Second Division ===
==== League table ====
Pos	Team	Pld	W	D	L	GF	GA	GAv	Pts	Promotion or relegation
18	Doncaster Rovers	42	14	9	19	51	71	0.718	37	
19	Nottingham Forest	42	12	11	19	69	76	0.908	35	
20	Barnsley	42	12	9	21	54	80	0.675	33	
21	Port Vale (R)	42	12	8	22	56	106	0.528	32	Relegation to the Third Division North
22	Hull City (R)	42	5	10	27	47	111	0.423	20	Relegation to the Third Division North

Rules for classification: 1) Points; 2) Goal average; 3) Goals scored
(R) Relegated

==== Results by matchday ====
Round	1	2	3	4	5	6	7	8	9	10	11	12	13	14	15	16	17	18	19	20	21	22	23	24	25	26	27	28	29	30	31	32	33	34	35	36	37	38	39	40	41	42
Ground	A	H	H	A	A	H	H	A	H	A	H	A	H	A	H	A	H	A	H	A	A	H	A	H	H	A	A	H	H	H	A	H	A	H	A	A	H	H	A	A	H	A
Result	L	D	W	L	D	W	W	L	L	L	L	L	W	L	L	L	D	L	D	L	W	L	L	W	L	D	L	W	W	W	L	D	L	W	W	L	W	D	L	L	L	D
Position	17	15	10	18	19	10	8	13	18	18	19	21	20	21	21	21	21	22	22	22	21	21	21	21	21	21	21	21	21	21	21	21	21	21	20	20	20	20	20	20	21	21
Points	0	1	3	3	4	6	8	8	8	8	8	8	10	10	10	10	11	11	12	12	14	14	14	16	16	17	17	19	21	23	23	24	24	26	28	28	30	31	31	31	31	32

Source: Statto
A = Away; H = Home; W = Win; D = Draw; L = Loss

==== Matches ====
31 August 1935 1	Barnsley	4–2	Port Vale	Barnsley
		Report	Caldwell; Stabb	Stadium: Oakwell; Attendance: 10,145

2 September 1935 2	Port Vale	1–1	Burnley	Hanley
	Stabb	Report		Stadium: Old Recreation Ground; Attendance: 9,450

7 September 1935 3	Port Vale	2–0	Plymouth Argyle	Hanley
	Gunn; Stabb	Report		Stadium: Old Recreation Ground; Attendance: 9,178

9 September 1935 4	Burnley	5–1	Port Vale	Burnley
		Report	Stabb	Stadium: Turf Moor; Attendance: 11,268

14 September 1935 5	Bradford City	1–1	Port Vale	Bradford
		Report	Birks	Stadium: Valley Parade; Attendance: 7,420

16 September 1935 6	Port Vale	2–1	Charlton Athletic	Hanley
	Baker; Curley	Report		Stadium: Old Recreation Ground; Attendance: 5,395

21 September 1935 7	Port Vale	3–0	Newcastle United	Hanley
	Baker 31'; Caldwell 55'; Leach (og.)	Report		Stadium: Old Recreation Ground; Attendance: 9,356; Referee: J. Rennie

28 September 1935 8	Tottenham Hotspur	5–2	Port Vale	Tottenham, North London
	Howe; Morrison	Report	Birks; Baker (pen.)	Stadium: White Hart Lane; Attendance: 32,872

5 October 1935 9	Port Vale	0–3	Manchester United	Hanley
		Report	Mutch; Bamford	Stadium: Old Recreation Ground; Attendance: 9,703

12 October 1935 10	Norwich City	4–2	Port Vale	Norwich
		Report	Caldwell; Rhodes	Stadium: Carrow Road; Attendance: 16,324

19 October 1935 11	Port Vale	0–2	Southampton	Hanley
		Report	Watson	Stadium: Old Recreation Ground; Attendance: 6,263

26 October 1935 12	Sheffield United	4–0	Port Vale	Sheffield
		Report		Stadium: Bramall Lane; Attendance: 12,499

2 November 1935 13	Port Vale	3–2	Bradford (Park Avenue)	Hanley
	Dackins; Mitcheson (pen.); Birks	Report		Stadium: Old Recreation Ground; Attendance: 8,571

9 November 1935 14	Leicester City	2–0	Port Vale	Leicester
	Carroll; Maw	Report		Stadium: Filbert Street; Attendance: 16,349

16 November 1935 15	Port Vale	0–1	Swansea Town	Hanley
		Report		Stadium: Old Recreation Ground; Attendance: 6,541

23 November 1935 16	Nottingham Forest	9–2	Port Vale	West Bridgford
15:00 GMT	Peacock 2', 33', 34', 66'; Simpson 26'; Race 46', 83'; Dent 79', 87'	Report	Rhodes; Caldwell	Stadium: City Ground; Attendance: 9,346; Referee: RA Mortimer

30 November 1935 17	Port Vale	2–2	Bury	Hanley
	Rhodes	Report		Stadium: Old Recreation Ground; Attendance: 5,586

7 December 1935 18	Doncaster Rovers	2–0	Port Vale	Doncaster
		Report		Stadium: Belle Vue; Attendance: 7,212

14 December 1935 19	Port Vale	2–2	Blackpool	Hanley
	Ryder	Report		Stadium: Old Recreation Ground; Attendance: 7,106

21 December 1935 20	West Ham United	4–0	Port Vale	Upton Park, London
	Foreman; Mangnall; Goulden	Report		Stadium: Boleyn Ground; Attendance: 13,905

26 December 1935 21	Hull City	1–2	Port Vale	Kingston upon Hull
14:15 GMT	Cameron 3'	Report	Caldwell; Roberts	Stadium: Anlaby Road; Attendance: 5,359

28 December 1935 22	Port Vale	0–4	Barnsley	Hanley
		Report		Stadium: Old Recreation Ground; Attendance: 7,381

4 January 1936 23	Plymouth Argyle	4–1	Port Vale	Plymouth
	Black	Report	Roberts	Stadium: Home Park; Attendance: 13,779; Referee: R. G. Rudd

18 January 1936 24	Port Vale	2–1	Bradford City	Hanley
	Glidden; Jones	Report		Stadium: Old Recreation Ground; Attendance: 7,906

1 February 1936 25	Port Vale	1–5	Tottenham Hotspur	Hanley
	Ryder	Report	Evans; Morrison; Sargent	Stadium: Old Recreation Ground; Attendance: 10,770

5 February 1936 26	Newcastle United	2–2	Port Vale	Newcastle upon Tyne
	Ware 36'; Smith 78'	Report	Stabb 33'; Roberts 55'	Stadium: St James' Park; Attendance: 9,238; Referee: J. Rennie

8 February 1936 27	Manchester United	7–2	Port Vale	Old Trafford
	Mutch; Rowley; Manley	Report	Caldwell; Ryder	Stadium: Old Trafford; Attendance: 22,265

15 February 1936 28	Port Vale	3–1	Norwich City	Hanley
	Stabb (pen.); Roberts; Rhodes	Report		Stadium: Old Recreation Ground; Attendance: 6,129

29 February 1936 29	Port Vale	2–0	Doncaster Rovers	Hanley
	Rhodes; Roberts	Report		Stadium: Old Recreation Ground; Attendance: 4,180

2 March 1936 30	Port Vale	4–0	Hull City	Hanley
16:00 GMT	Roberts; Stabb	Report		Stadium: Old Recreation Ground; Attendance: 2,669

7 March 1936 31	Swansea Town	3–2	Port Vale	Swansea
		Report	Roberts	Stadium: Vetch Field; Attendance: 5,151

14 March 1936 32	Port Vale	1–1	Leicester City	Hanley
	Roberts	Report	Carroll	Stadium: Old Recreation Ground; Attendance: 8,331

21 March 1936 33	Bradford (Park Avenue)	3–0	Port Vale	Bradford
		Report		Stadium: Park Avenue; Attendance: 4,332

28 March 1936 34	Port Vale	2–0	Nottingham Forest	Hanley
15:00 GMT	Dean; Caldwell	Report		Stadium: Old Recreation Ground; Attendance: 6,204; Referee: RA Mortimer

30 March 1936 35	Southampton	0–1	Port Vale	Southampton
		Report	Stabb	Stadium: The Dell; Attendance: 1,875

4 April 1936 36	Bury	5–0	Port Vale	Bury, Greater Manchester
		Report		Stadium: Gigg Lane; Attendance: 3,829

10 April 1936 37	Port Vale	1–0	Fulham	Hanley
	Baker	Report		Stadium: Old Recreation Ground; Attendance: 11,972

11 April 1936 38	Port Vale	1–1	Sheffield United	Hanley
	Dean	Report		Stadium: Old Recreation Ground; Attendance: 12,240

13 April 1936 39	Fulham	7–0	Port Vale	Fulham, West London
		Report		Stadium: Craven Cottage; Attendance: 9,954

18 April 1936 40	Blackpool	3–1	Port Vale	Blackpool
		Report	Stabb	Stadium: Bloomfield Road; Attendance: 9,326

25 April 1936 41	Port Vale	2–3	West Ham United	Hanley
	Roberts; Caldwell	Report	Foxall; Mangnall	Stadium: Old Recreation Ground; Attendance: 8,066

2 May 1936 42	Charlton Athletic	1–1	Port Vale	Charlton, London
		Report	Caldwell	Stadium: The Valley; Attendance: 27,778

=== FA Cup ===
11 January 1936 R3	Sunderland	2–2	Port Vale	Sunderland
	Connor 61'; Gallacher 76'	Report	Stabb 30'; Caldwell 85'	Stadium: Roker Park; Attendance: 29,278; Referee: E.D. Smith

13 January 1936 Replay	Port Vale	2–0	Sunderland	Hanley
	Stabb 5'; Rhodes 22'	Report		Stadium: Old Recreation Ground; Attendance: 16,677; Referee: E.D. Smith

25 January 1936 R4	Port Vale	0–4	Grimsby Town	Hanley
		Report		Stadium: Old Recreation Ground; Attendance: 13,350

== Squad statistics ==
=== Appearances and goals ===
Key to positions: GK – Goalkeeper; FB – Full back; HB – Half back; FW – Forward

No.	Pos	Nat	Player	Total		Second Division		FA Cup	
No.	Pos	Nat	Player	Apps	Goals	Apps	Goals	Apps	Goals
	GK	(England) ENG	John Potts	43	0	40	0	3	0
	GK	(Scotland) SCO	Allan Todd	1	0	1	0	0	0
	FB	(England) ENG	Ernest Breeze	10	0	10	0	0	0
	FB	(England) ENG	George Heywood	21	0	21	0	0	0
	FB	(England) ENG	George Shenton	14	0	14	0	0	0
	FB	(England) ENG	Roderick Welsh	23	0	20	0	3	0
	HB	(England) ENG	James Bewick	3	0	3	0	0	0
	HB	(England) ENG	Cliff Birks	15	3	15	3	0	0
	HB	(England) ENG	Michael Curley	27	1	24	1	3	0
	HB	(England) ENG	Harry Griffiths	30	0	27	0	3	0
	HB	(Scotland) SCO	Ken Gunn	28	1	28	1	0	0
	HB	(England) ENG	Eric Hayward	13	0	13	0	0	0
	HB	(England) ENG	Roger Jones	38	1	35	1	3	0
	HB	(England) ENG	Trevor Rhodes	30	7	28	6	2	1
	FW	(England) ENG	Frank Baker	0	0	0	0	0	0
	FW	(England) ENG	Arthur Caldwell	42	10	39	9	3	1
	FW	(Wales) WAL	Haydn Dackins	9	1	9	1	0	0
	FW	(England) ENG	Luke Dean	9	2	9	2	0	0
	FW	(England) ENG	Gilbert Glidden	6	1	5	1	1	0
	FW	(England) ENG	Cliff Johnson	8	0	5	0	3	0
	FW	(Scotland) SCO	Henry Pinkerton	3	0	3	0	0	0
	FW	(England) ENG	Jack Roberts	21	12	21	12	0	0
	FW	(England) ENG	Frank Ryder	17	4	17	4	0	0
	FW	(England) ENG	George Stabb	33	11	30	9	3	2
Players who featured but departed the club during the season:
	FB	(England) ENG	Jack Vickers	18	0	15	0	3	0
	FW	(England) ENG	James Baker	12	4	9	4	3	0
	FW	(England) ENG	Roy Burns	2	0	2	0	0	0
	FW	(England) ENG	Fred Mitcheson	15	1	15	1	0	0
	FW	(England) ENG	John Wilson	3	0	3	0	0	0

=== Top scorers ===
Place	Position	Nation	Name	Second Division	FA Cup	Total
1	FW	England	Jack Roberts	12	0	12
2	FW	England	George Stabb	9	2	11
3	FW	England	Arthur Caldwell	9	1	10
4	HB	England	Trevor Rhodes	6	1	7
5	FW	England	James Baker	4	0	4
–	FW	England	Frank Ryder	4	0	4
7	HB	England	Cliff Birks	3	0	3
8	FW	England	Luke Dean	2	0	2
9	HB	Scotland	Ken Gunn	1	0	1
–	HB	England	Roger Jones	1	0	1
–	FW	England	Gilbert Glidden	1	0	1
–	HB	England	Michael Curle	1	0	1
–	FW	England	Fred Mitcheson	1	0	1
–	FW	Wales	Haydn Dackins	1	0	1
–	–	–	Own goals	1	0	1
			TOTALS	56	4	60

== Transfers ==
=== Transfers in ===
Date from	Position	Nationality	Name	From	Fee	Ref.
May 1935	HB	ENG	James Bewick	Newcastle United	Free transfer	
May 1935	HB	ENG	Michael Curley	Manchester City	Free transfer	
May 1935	FW	ENG	Gilbert Glidden	Sunderland	Free transfer	
May 1935	HB	ENG	Harry Griffiths	Everton	Free transfer	
May 1935	FW	SCO	Henry Pinkerton	Hull City	Free transfer	
May 1935	FB	ENG	Roderick Welsh	Portsmouth	Free transfer	
May 1935	FW	ENG	John Wilson	West Bromwich Albion	Free transfer	
July 1935	FW	WAL	Haydn Dackins	Swansea Town	Free transfer	
July 1935	FW	ENG	George Stabb	Notts County	Free transfer	
October 1935	FW	ENG	Roy Burns	Wolverhampton Wanderers	Free transfer	
October 1935	FW	ENG	Cliff Johnson	Wolverhampton Wanderers	Free transfer	
November 1935	FW	ENG	Frank Ryder	Altrincham	Free transfer	
November 1935	FB	ENG	Roderick Welsh	Altrincham	£250	
December 1935	FW	ENG	Jack Roberts	Wigan Athletic	'large'	

=== Transfers out ===
Date from	Position	Nationality	Name	To	Fee	Ref.
November 1935	FW	ENG	Fred Mitcheson	Plymouth Argyle	Undisclosed	
December 1935	FW	ENG	John Wilson	Wigan Athletic	Free transfer	
January 1936	FW	ENG	Roy Burns	Bournemouth Trams	Contract cancelled	
April 1936	FW	ENG	James Baker	Barrow	Released	
April 1936	FB	ENG	Jack Vickers	Newport County	Released	
May 1936	HB	ENG	James Bewick	Walsall	Released	
May 1936	HB	ENG	Cliff Birks	Torquay United	Released	
June 1936	FW	ENG	Cliff Johnson	Torquay United	Free transfer	
June 1936	FB	ENG	George Shenton	Shelton Iron and Steel	Released	
Summer 1936	FB	ENG	Ernest Breeze	Shrewsbury Town	Released	
Summer 1936	FW	WAL	Haydn Dackins	Northwich Victoria	Released	
Summer 1936	FW	ENG	Gilbert Glidden	Reading	Released	
Summer 1936	FW	SCO	Henry Pinkerton	Burnley	Released	
Summer 1936	GK	ENG	John Potts		Released	
