= George Hayward =

George Hayward may refer to:

- George Hayward (MP), Member of Parliament (MP) for Bridgnorth
- George Hayward (surgeon) (1791–1863), American surgeon
- George Hayward (rugby) (1887–1948), Welsh international rugby union forward
- George W. Hayward (1840–1870), British explorer
- George S. L. Hayward (1894–1924), English World War I aerial observer

== See also ==
- George Haywood (1906–1992), English footballer
- George Heywood (1907–1985), English footballer
