= Claude Barrett =

English footballer

Personal information
- Full name: Claude Barrett
- Date of birth: 5 December 1907
- Place of birth: Rawdon, West Yorkshire, England
- Date of death: 3 August 1976 (aged 68)
- Place of death: Bradford, England
- Height: 5 ft 9 in (1.75 m)
- Position: Left back

Youth career
- Rawdon Old Boys

Senior career*
Years	Team	Apps	(Gls)
1932–1936	Bradford Park Avenue	47	(0)
1936–1937	Port Vale	19	(0)
1937–1939	York City	41	(0)
Total		107	(0)
- * Club domestic league appearances and goals

Claude Barrett (5 December 1907 – 3 August 1976) was an English footballer who played in the Football League for Bradford Park Avenue, Port Vale and York City.

== Career ==
Born in Rawdon, West Yorkshire, Barrett played for Rawdon Old Boys and turned professional with Bradford Park Avenue in February 1932, where he made 47 Second Division appearances in the Football League. He joined Port Vale of the Third Division North in June 1936 and after making his debut in a 1–0 defeat at Wrexham on 19 September 1936, he made 19 consecutive appearances, only losing his place through influenza in January 1937. However, upon recovery he discovered that Roderick Welsh had effectively filled his place and so Barrett left for York City on a free transfer in April 1937. He made his debut in a 2–1 defeat to Crewe Alexandra on 6 November 1937 and he finished the 1937–38 season with 38 appearances in all competitions. He lost his place in the York team following a 6–0 defeat to Bradford City on 10 December 1938, and was released at the end of the 1938–39 season.

== Career statistics ==
Appearances and goals by club, season and competition
Club	Season	League			FA Cup		Total	
Club	Season	Division	Apps	Goals	Apps	Goals	Apps	Goals
Bradford Park Avenue	1932–33	Second Division	11	0	1	0	12	0
Bradford Park Avenue	1933–34	Second Division	13	0	0	0	13	0
Bradford Park Avenue	1934–35	Second Division	17	0	0	0	17	0
Bradford Park Avenue	1935–36	Second Division	6	0	0	0	6	0
Bradford Park Avenue	Total		47	0	1	0	48	0
Port Vale	1936–37	Third Division North	19	0	0	0	19	0
York City	1937–38	Third Division North	29	0	9	0	38	0
York City	1938–39	Third Division North	12	0	0	0	12	0
York City	Total		41	0	9	0	50	0
Career total			107	0	10	0	117	0
