= Cliff Johnson =

Cliff or Clifford Johnson may refer to:

- Cliff Johnson (baseball) (born 1947), former Major League Baseball designated hitter
- Cliff Johnson (footballer) (1914–1989), English footballer
- Cliff Johnson (game designer) (born 1953), computer puzzle games creator
- Cliff Johnson (rugby league) (1928–2003), New Zealand rugby league footballer
- Clifford V. Johnson (born 1968), English theoretical physicist
- Clifford D. Johnson, American lawyer
