= Warney =

Warney may refer to the following people:

- Jameel Warney (born 1994), American basketball player
- Shane Warne (1969–2022), Australian cricketer and media personality, nicknamed Warney
- Warney Cresswell (1897-1973), English cricketer
