= Frank Ryder =

English footballer (1909–1978)

Personal information
- Full name: Frank Ryder
- Date of birth: 7 March 1909
- Place of birth: Summerseat, England
- Date of death: November 1978 (aged 69)
- Height: 5 ft 8 in (1.73 m)
- Position: Right winger

Youth career
- Summerseat

Senior career*
Years	Team	Apps	(Gls)
?	Prescot Cables	?	(?)
1932?–1933?	Bury	6	(3)
1933?–1934?	Torquay United	21	(9)
1934	Rochdale	6	(0)
1934–1935	Ards	?	(?)
1935	Altrincham	?	(?)
1935–1937	Port Vale	23	(4)
- * Club domestic league appearances and goals

Frank Ryder (born 7 March 1909 – November 1978) was an English footballer who played as a winger for Prescot Cables, Bury, Torquay United, Rochdale, Ards, Altrincham, and Port Vale in the 1930s.

== Career ==
Ryder played for Summerseat, Prescot Cables, Burnley (on trial), Bury, Torquay United, Rochdale, Ards, and Altrincham. He joined Port Vale in November 1935. He scored two goals in a 2–2 draw with Blackpool at the Old Recreation Ground on 14 December. Also, he bagged goals in heavy defeats to Tottenham Hotspur and Manchester United in February. He lost his first-team place after seriously injuring his right shinbone at a 3–0 defeat to Bradford Park Avenue at the Horsfall Stadium on 21 March. He had played 17 Second Division games in the 1935–36 season, as the "Valiants" were relegated. He made six Third Division North appearances in the 1936–37 season, and left on a free transfer in April 1937.

== Career statistics ==
Appearances and goals by club, season and competition
Club	Season	League			FA Cup		Other		Total	
Club	Season	Division	Apps	Goals	Apps	Goals	Apps	Goals	Apps	Goals
Bury	1931–32	Second Division	5	3	0	0	0	0	5	3
Bury	1932–33	Second Division	1	0	0	0	0	0	1	0
Bury	Total		6	3	0	0	0	0	6	3
Torquay United	1933–34	Third Division South	21	9	3	0	2	0	26	9
Rochdale	1934–35	Third Division North	6	0	0	0	1	0	7	0
Port Vale	1935–36	Second Division	17	4	0	0	0	0	17	4
Port Vale	1936–37	Third Division North	6	0	1	0	1	0	8	0
Port Vale	Total		23	4	1	0	1	0	25	4
