= Peter Miller (footballer, born 1908) =

Scottish footballer

Personal information
- Full name: Peter Steedman Miller
- Date of birth: 15 April 1908
- Place of birth: Bo'ness, Scotland
- Date of death: 19 May 1979 (aged 71)
- Place of death: Bo'ness, Scotland
- Height: 5 ft 8 in (1.73 m)
- Positions: Inside forward; half back

Senior career*
Years	Team	Apps	(Gls)
- Bo'ness
1927–1929	Grange Rovers		
1929–1930	Falkirk	17	(7)
1930–1931	Watford	14	(0)
1931–1935	New Brighton	140	(22)
1935–1936	Le Havre		
1936	Rotherham United	11	(2)
1936–1937	Port Vale	13	(1)
Total		195+	(32+)
- * Club domestic league appearances and goals

Peter Steedman Miller (15 April 1908 – 19 May 1979) was a Scottish footballer with "great footwork".

== Career ==
Miller played for Bo'ness and Grange Rovers, before spending 1929–30 with First Division club Falkirk. He then moved to England to play for Watford, making 14 appearances in 1930–31, as the Vicarage Road club struggled near the bottom of the Third Division South. He then moved on to league rivals New Brighton, who had to apply for re-election in both 1931–32 and 1932–33. After improved efforts in 1933–34 and 1934–35, he spent 1935–36 in France with Ligue 2 side Le Havre. He returned to England with Third Division North side Rotherham United, and scored on his debut on 25 January, his goal contributing to a 4–0 win over Darlington at Millmoor. He scored a total of three goals in 11 leagues games for the "Millers". He joined Port Vale in June 1936, and scored on his debut in a 3–1 defeat to Hull City at the Old Recreation Ground on 29 August. However, he failed to score over his next 12 Third Division North games, and was given a free transfer in April 1937.

== Career statistics ==
Appearances and goals by club, season and competition
Club	Season	League			FA Cup		Other		Total	
Club	Season	Division	Apps	Goals	Apps	Goals	Apps	Goals	Apps	Goals
Watford	1930–31	Third Division South	14	0	2	1	0	0	16	1
New Brighton	1931–32	Third Division North	34	1	2	0	0	0	36	1
New Brighton	1932–33	Third Division North	35	13	1	0	0	0	36	1
New Brighton	1933–34	Third Division North	33	4	3	0	1	1	37	5
New Brighton	1934–35	Third Division North	38	4	4	0	1	0	43	4
New Brighton	Total		140	22	10	0	2	1	152	23
Rotherham United	1935–36	Third Division North	11	2	0	0	0	0	11	2
Port Vale	1936–37	Third Division North	13	1	1	0	3	0	17	1
Career total			178	25	13	1	5	1	196	27
