= Luke Dean (footballer, born 1913) =

English footballer

Personal information
- Full name: Luke Dean
- Date of birth: 21 June 1913
- Place of birth: Hanley, England
- Date of death: 1 February 1975 (age 62)
- Place of death: Stoke-on-Trent, England
- Height: 5 ft 5 1/2 in (1.66 m)
- Position: Forward

Youth career
- Downing's Tileries

Senior career*
Years	Team	Apps	(Gls)
1934–1937	Port Vale	32	(9)
- Northwich Victoria
- * Club domestic league appearances and goals

Luke Dean (21 June 1913 – 1975) was an English footballer who played as a forward for Port Vale and Northwich Victoria.

== Career ==
Dean played for Downing's Tileries before joining Port Vale in August 1934. He featured in ten Second Division games in the 1934–35 season, and scored two of his first goals in the English Football League on 9 February, in a 2–2 draw with Burnley at Turf Moor. Seven days later he claimed another goal in a 2–0 win over Oldham Athletic at the Old Recreation Ground. He played nine games in the 1935–36 relegation season, and scored goals against Nottingham Forest and Sheffield United. He made 13 Third Division North appearances in the 1936–37 campaign, and claimed goals against Mansfield Town, Gateshead, Rotherham United, and Lincoln City. He was given a free transfer to Northwich Victoria in August 1937.

== Career statistics ==
Appearances and goals by club, season and competition
Club	Season	League			FA Cup		Other		Total	
Club	Season	Division	Apps	Goals	Apps	Goals	Apps	Goals	Apps	Goals
Port Vale	1934–35	Second Division	10	3	0	0	0	0	10	3
Port Vale	1935–36	Second Division	9	2	0	0	0	0	9	2
Port Vale	1936–37	Third Division North	13	4	0	0	1	0	14	4
Port Vale	Total		32	9	0	0	1	0	33	9
