= Arthur Caldwell (footballer, born 1913) =

English footballer

Personal information
- Full name: Arthur John Caldwell
- Date of birth: 24 February 1913
- Place of birth: Salford, England
- Date of death: 26 July 1989 (aged 76)
- Place of death: Irlam, England
- Height: 5 ft 8 in (1.73 m)
- Position: Left winger

Youth career
- 1932–1933: Manchester United

Senior career*
Years	Team	Apps	(Gls)
1933–1935	Winsford United		
1935–1939	Port Vale	92	(21)
- * Club domestic league appearances and goals

Arthur John Caldwell (24 February 1913 – 26 July 1989) was an English footballer. A left winger noted for his pace, he played for Manchester United, Winsford United and Port Vale in the 1930s.

== Career ==
Caldwell played for Manchester United (without making any first-team appearances) and Winsford United, and after a trial at Aston Villa joined Port Vale in May 1935. He played one Second Division game for the club in the 1934–35 season. He scored ten goals in 42 games in the 1935–36 season, the first one of note being against former employers Manchester United at Old Trafford in a 7–2 defeat. He also scored the equaliser in a 2–2 draw with top-flight Sunderland at Roker Park that earned the "Valiants" a replay in the third round of the FA Cup. However, he was limited to just 13 Third Division North games in the 1936–37 season, scoring two goals, as he was struck down with injury. He recovered to score ten goals in 35 league games in the 1937–38, including a hat-trick in a 5–1 win over Hartlepools United at the Old Recreation Ground on 9 October. However, he featured just four times in the Third Division South in the 1938–39 season, and left the club as World War II approached.

== Career statistics ==
Appearances and goals by club, season and competition
Club	Season	League			FA Cup		Other		Total	
Club	Season	Division	Apps	Goals	Apps	Goals	Apps	Goals	Apps	Goals
Port Vale	1934–35	Second Division	1	0	0	0	0	0	1	0
Port Vale	1935–36	Second Division	39	9	3	1	0	0	42	10
Port Vale	1936–37	Third Division North	13	2	0	0	1	0	14	2
Port Vale	1937–38	Third Division North	35	10	1	0	1	0	37	10
Port Vale	1938–39	Third Division South	4	0	0	0	2	0	6	0
Port Vale	Total		92	21	4	1	4	0	100	22
