= Haydn Dackins =

Welsh footballer

Personal information
- Full name: Haydn Vernon Dackins
- Date of birth: 10 July 1912
- Place of birth: Pontypridd, Wales
- Date of death: 2 August 1943 (aged 31)
- Place of death: Sicily, Italy
- Position: Forward

Senior career*
Years	Team	Apps	(Gls)
1934–1935	Swansea Town	2	(0)
1935–1936	Port Vale	9	(1)
1936–1937	Northwich Victoria		
1937–1938	Macclesfield Town	45	(6)
- Hurst
Total		56+	(7+)
- * Club domestic league appearances and goals

Haydn Vernon Dackins (10 July 1912 – 2 August 1943) was a Welsh footballer who was killed during World War II.

== Career ==
Dackins played two Second Division games for Swansea Town in 1934–35, before joining Port Vale in July 1935. He played just nine games and scored one goal in the 1935–36 season and was released after the season end. His goal came in a 3–2 win over Bradford Park Avenue at the Old Recreation Ground on 2 November 1935. He then moved on to Northwich Victoria and Macclesfield Town, leaving the "Silkmen" for Hurst after his registration was terminated in November 1938 due to disciplinary action.

== World War II ==
Dackins served in the Royal Inniskilling Fusiliers. He was killed in action during the Second World War on 2 August 1943, at the age of 31. He is buried at Catania War Cemetery in Catania, Sicily. This would indicate that he had lost his life during the Allied invasion of Sicily.

== Career statistics ==
Appearances and goals by club, season and competition
Club	Season	League			FA Cup		Total	
Club	Season	Division	Apps	Goals	Apps	Goals	Apps	Goals
Swansea Town	1934–35	Second Division	2	0	0	0	2	0
Port Vale	1935–36	Second Division	9	1	0	0	9	1
Macclesfield Town	1937–38	Cheshire County League	35	6	0	0	35	6
Macclesfield Town	1938–39	Cheshire County League	10	0	2	2	12	2
Macclesfield Town	Total		45	6	2	2	47	8

== See also ==
- List of footballers killed during World War II
