= Fred Obrey =

English footballer

Personal information
- Full name: Alfred Obrey
- Date of birth: 3 June 1912
- Place of birth: Cheadle, Staffordshire, England
- Date of death: 26 November 1986 (aged 74)
- Place of death: Stoke-on-Trent, England
- Position: Centre-half

Youth career
- Longton

Senior career*
Years	Team	Apps	(Gls)
1936–1938	Port Vale	45	(1)
1938–1939	Tranmere Rovers	17	(0)
Total		62	(1)
- * Club domestic league appearances and goals

Alfred Obrey (3 June 1912 – 26 November 1986) was an English footballer.

== Career ==
Obrey played for Longton before joining Port Vale as an amateur in May 1936, signing as a professional in October of that year. He made his debut in October 1936 and his first game was the first of a 13-game unbeaten run for the club, the first nine of which Obrey helped prevent the opposing centre-forwards from scoring any goals. He scored his first senior goal against York City on 13 February 1937, in a 2–1 victory at Bootham Crescent. He finished the 1936–37 season with 33 appearances to his name. He lost his first-team place in December 1937, and was limited to 16 Third Division North appearances in 1937–38. He was transferred to Tranmere Rovers in June 1938, who were relegated out of the Second Division in 1938–39. Obrey returned to Port Vale as a guest in September 1939, but left on the conclusion of the 1939–40 season as the club went into abeyance due to the war.

== Career statistics ==
Appearances and goals by club, season and competition
Club	Season	League			Cups		Total	
Club	Season	Division	Apps	Goals	Apps	Goals	Apps	Goals
Port Vale	1936–37	Third Division North	29	1	4	0	33	1
Port Vale	1937–38	Third Division North	16	0	2	0	18	0
Port Vale	Total		45	1	6	0	51	1
Tranmere Rovers	1938–39	Second Division	17	0	0	0	17	0
Career total			62	1	6	0	68	1
