= Gilbert Glidden =

English footballer

Personal information
- Full name: Gilbert Swinburne Glidden
- Date of birth: 15 December 1915
- Place of birth: Sunderland, England
- Date of death: October 1988 (age 72)
- Place of death: Staffordshire, England
- Height: 5 ft 9 in (1.75 m)
- Positions: Inside forward; right back

Senior career*
Years	Team	Apps	(Gls)
1932–1933	Sunderland	0	(0)
1935–1936	Port Vale	5	(1)
1936–1950	Reading	111	(24)
1950–?	Leyton Orient	1	(0)
Total		117	(25)

International career
- England Schoolboys
- * Club domestic league appearances and goals

Gilbert Swinburne Glidden (15 December 1915 – October 1988) was an English footballer who played for Sunderland, Port Vale, Reading, and Leyton Orient.

== Career ==
Glidden was signed to Sunderland before joining Port Vale in May 1935. He played five Second Division games and one FA Cup game in the 1935–36 season, and scored one goal in a 2–1 win over Bradford City at the Old Recreation Ground on 18 January. The "Valiants" were relegated, and Glidden moved on to Reading. The "Royals" competed in the Third Division South, finishing fifth in 1936–37, sixth in 1937–38, and fifth in 1938–39. He scored 24 goals in 111 league appearances at Elm Park. He guested for Tranmere Rovers, Aldershot, Crewe Alexandra, Everton and Manchester United during World War II. He played one game for Leyton Orient after the war.

== Career statistics ==
Appearances and goals by club, season and competition
Club	Season	League			FA Cup		Other		Total	
Club	Season	Division	Apps	Goals	Apps	Goals	Apps	Goals	Apps	Goals
Sunderland	1932–33	First Division	0	0	0	0	0	0	0	0
Port Vale	1935–36	Second Division	5	1	1	0	0	0	6	1
Reading	1936–37	Third Division South	20	5	1	0	0	0	21	5
Reading	1937–38	Third Division South	4	1	0	0	1	1	5	2
Reading	1938–39	Third Division South	9	0	1	1	2	0	12	1
Reading	1945–46		0	0	2	0	0	0	2	0
Reading	1946–47	Third Division South	34	5	4	0	0	0	38	5
Reading	1947–48	Third Division South	7	0	0	0	0	0	7	0
Reading	1948–49	Third Division South	22	12	0	0	0	0	22	12
Reading	1949–50	Third Division South	15	1	0	0	0	0	15	1
Reading	Total		111	24	8	1	3	1	122	26
Leyton Orient	1950–51	Third Division South	1	0	0	0	0	0	1	0
Career total			117	25	9	1	3	1	129	27
