= Henry Pinkerton =

Scottish footballer

Personal information
- Full name: Henry Pinkerton
- Date of birth: 7 May 1915
- Place of birth: Glasgow, Scotland
- Date of death: 1986 (aged 70–71)
- Place of death: Toronto, Ontario, Canada
- Height: 5 ft 9 in (1.75 m)
- Position: Inside forward

Youth career
- 1933–1934: Dunipace Juniors

Senior career*
Years	Team	Apps	(Gls)
1934–1935	Hull City	2	(1)
1935–1936	Port Vale	3	(0)
1936–1938	Burnley	3	(0)
1938–1946	Falkirk	6	(0)
1946–1947	Kilsyth Rangers		
1947–1949	Bo'ness United		
1949–1950	Arthurlie		

International career
1939	Scotland (wartime)	1	(0)

Managerial career
- 1951–1952: Stenhousemuir
- * Club domestic league appearances and goals

Henry Pinkerton (7 May 1915 – 1986) was a Scottish football player and manager. He was capped by Scotland (wartime) in 1939 after playing in the English Football League for Hull City, Port Vale and Burnley. He played in Scotland for Dunipace Juniors, Falkirk, Kilsyth Rangers, Bo'ness United and Arthurlie. He trained Stenhousemuir in the 1951–52 season.

== Career ==
Pinkerton worked as a telegraph boy after leaving school. He had trial matches at Falkirk and Airdrie in September 1933 while playing for Banknock juveniles team, having previously played for Kilsyth Hub juveniles. In November 1933, Pinkerton joined Dunipace Juniors. Playing at inside left, he attracted the attention of visiting scouts, including one representing English Second Division club Hull City. Pinkerton joined Hull City on amateur terms in February 1934, aged 17, and signed professional terms three months later on his 18th birthday. After spending a season developing in the reserves, he made his first-team debut at centre-forward in March 1935. He scored the winning goal against Port Vale the following week. However, the return to fitness of fellow Scot Dave Wright displaced him from the first team, and Pinkerton left Hull City two months later.

Pinkerton joined Port Vale in May 1935. After just two games he was released at the end of the 1935–36 season, at which point he moved on to Second Division rivals Burnley. He made his Burnley debut on 26 September 1936 in the goalless draw with Swansea Town at Turf Moor. Pinkerton made two further league appearances for Burnley in the 1937–38 campaign, before leaving to play for Falkirk in August 1938. He made six starts during his first season at Brockville Park before the outbreak of the World War II brought competitive senior football to a halt. He served in the Royal Air Force during the war. He was capped by Scotland in wartime in a 2–1 defeat to England at St James' Park on 2 December 1939. Pinkerton also played four games for Dundee United in 1940 and continued to make occasional appearances for Falkirk when permitted by his military duties. He played in the 1942–43 final of the Southern League Cup, which ended in defeat to Rangers at Hampden Park.

Demobilised in 1946, Pinkerton was released by Falkirk. He declined an opportunity to join another professional club and instead returned to junior football, spending the 1946–47 season with Kilsyth Rangers. In July 1947 he joined Bo'ness United and helped the club win the Edinburgh & District League and Scottish Junior Cup double in 1948. After another season with Bo'ness, he moved to Arthurlie in July 1949. Pinkerton retired from playing in the summer of 1950. In October that year he became trainer and coach at Kirkintilloch Rob Roy, before being appointed trainer of Stenhousemuir in June 1951, a position he held for a year. In November 1952, Pinkerton emigrated to the United States to pursue a career in football coaching. He lived in New York and Buffalo before settling in Toronto, Canada, in August 1959.

== Career statistics ==
Appearances and goals by club, season and competition
Club	Season	League			FA Cup		Total	
Club	Season	Division	Apps	Goals	Apps	Goals	Apps	Goals
Hull City	1934–35	Second Division	2	1	0	0	2	1
Port Vale	1935–36	Second Division	3	0	0	0	3	0
Burnley	1936–37	Second Division	1	0	0	0	1	0
Burnley	1937–38	Second Division	2	0	0	0	2	0
Burnley	Total		3	0	0	0	3	0

== Honours ==
Falkirk

- Southern League Cup runner-up: 1942–43

Bo'ness United

- Edinburgh & District League: 1947–48
- Scottish Junior Cup: 1948
