= John Wilson (footballer, born 1914) =

English footballer

Personal information
- Full name: John Richard Montague Wilson
- Date of birth: 30 October 1914
- Place of birth: Lanchester, County Durham, England
- Date of death: 2 November 1988 (aged 74)
- Place of death: Shrewsbury, England
- Position: Inside right

Youth career
- Consett Parish Church
- Medomsley Juniors

Senior career*
Years	Team	Apps	(Gls)
	West Bromwich Albion	0	(0)
1935	Port Vale	3	(0)
- Wigan Athletic
- Shrewsbury Town
- * Club domestic league appearances and goals

John Richard Montague Wilson (30 October 1914 – 2 November 1988) was an English footballer who played on the inside-right for West Bromwich Albion, Port Vale, Wigan Athletic, and Shrewsbury Town.

== Career ==
Wilson played for West Bromwich Albion before joining Port Vale in May 1935. He failed to gain a regular first-team spot and having made just the three Second Division appearances in the 1935–36 season he was transferred away from the Old Recreation Ground to Wigan Athletic in December 1935. Later he moved to Shrewsbury Town.

== Career statistics ==
Appearances and goals by club, season and competition
Club	Season	League			FA Cup		Other		Total	
Club	Season	Division	Apps	Goals	Apps	Goals	Apps	Goals	Apps	Goals
Port Vale	1935–36	Second Division	3	0	0	0	0	0	3	0
