= James Bewick =

English footballer

Personal information
- Full name: James Bewick
- Date of birth: 21 December 1906
- Place of birth: Sunderland, England
- Date of death: 1979 (aged 72–73)
- Place of death: Sunderland, England
- Height: 5 ft 9 1/2 in (1.77 m)
- Position: Defender

Youth career
- Herrington Swifts
- Newcastle United

Senior career*
Years	Team	Apps	(Gls)
1935–1936	Port Vale	3	(0)
1936–1937	Walsall	3	(0)
- Yeovil & Petters United
- South Shields
- * Club domestic league appearances and goals

James Bewick (21 December 1906 – 1979) was an English footballer who played in defence for Newcastle United, Port Vale, Walsall, Yeovil & Petters United, and South Shields.

== Career ==
Bewick played for Herrington Swifts and Newcastle United before joining Port Vale in May 1935. He made his debut at centre-half in a 1–1 draw with Bradford City at Valley Parade on 14 September 1935 but only made two further Second Division appearances in the 1935–36 season before being released from the Old Recreation Ground in May 1936. He then moved on to Walsall, Yeovil & Petters United and South Shields.

== Career statistics ==
Appearances and goals by club, season and competition
Club	Season	League			FA Cup		Total	
Club	Season	Division	Apps	Goals	Apps	Goals	Apps	Goals
Port Vale	1935–36	Second Division	3	0	0	0	3	0
Walsall	1936–37	Third Division South	3	0	0	0	3	0
