= Roy Burns (footballer) =

English footballer

Personal information
- Full name: Roy Burns
- Date of birth: 6 October 1916
- Place of birth: Wolverhampton, England
- Date of death: 20 November 1983 (aged 67)
- Place of death: Petersfield, Hampshire, England
- Height: 5 ft 10 1/2 in (1.79 m)
- Position: Outside right

Youth career
- Wolverhampton Wanderers

Senior career*
Years	Team	Apps	(Gls)
1935–1936	Port Vale	2	(0)
1936	Bournemouth Trams		
1936–1937	Bournemouth & Boscombe Athletic	18	(3)
- Bournemouth Trams
- * Club domestic league appearances and goals

Roy Burns (6 October 1916 – 20 November 1983) was an English footballer who played in the Football League for Port Vale and Bournemouth & Boscombe Athletic.

== Career ==
Burns began his professional career with Wolverhampton Wanderers but never made a first-team appearance for the club before joining Port Vale in October 1935. He failed to nail down a regular place. He played just two Second Division games, defeats to Leicester City at Filbert Street and Swansea Town at the Old Recreation Ground in November 1935, before having his contract cancelled in January 1936. He moved to Bournemouth to play for Bournemouth Trams, Bournemouth & Boscombe Athletic and once more with Bournemouth Trams.

== Career statistics ==
Appearances and goals by club, season and competition
Club	Season	League			FA Cup		Other		Total	
Club	Season	Division	Apps	Goals	Apps	Goals	Apps	Goals	Apps	Goals
Port Vale	1935–36	Second Division	2	0	0	0	0	0	2	0
Bournemouth & Boscombe Athletic	1936–37	Third Division South	18	3	2	0	4	0	21	3
