= Jack Harrison (footballer, born 1916) =

English footballer

Personal information
- Date of birth: 27 August 1916
- Position: Right winger

Youth career
- Sneyd Colliery

Senior career*
Years	Team	Apps	(Gls)
1936–1937	Port Vale	2	(0)
Total		2	(0)
- * Club domestic league appearances and goals

Jack Harrison (born 27 August 1916) was an English footballer who played for Port Vale in the 1930s.

== Career ==
Harrison played for Sneyd Colliery before joining Port Vale as an amateur in May 1936, signing as a professional in August of that year. He played just two Third Division North and two cup games and left the Old Recreation Ground on a free transfer in April 1937.

== Career statistics ==
Appearances and goals by club, season and competition
Club	Season	League			FA Cup		Other		Total	
Club	Season	Division	Apps	Goals	Apps	Goals	Apps	Goals	Apps	Goals
Port Vale	1936–37	Third Division North	2	0	0	0	2	0	4	0
Total			2	0	0	0	2	0	4	0
