= Michael Curley (footballer) =

English footballer

Personal information
- Full name: Michael Curley
- Date of birth: 15 May 1912
- Place of birth: Northwich, England
- Date of death: 1973 (aged 60–61)
- Place of death: Ashton-under-Lyne, England
- Height: 6 ft 0 in (1.83 m)
- Position: Half-back

Youth career
- Northwich Victoria

Senior career*
Years	Team	Apps	(Gls)
1934–1935	Manchester City	0	(0)
1935–1936	Port Vale	27	(1)
1936–193?	Colwyn Bay		
193?–193?	Macclesfield Town	2	(0)
193?–193?	Northwich Victoria		
1937–1940	Mossley		
- * Club domestic league appearances and goals

Michael Curley (15 May 1912 – 1973) was an English footballer who played for Northwich Victoria, Manchester City, Port Vale, Colwyn Bay, and Macclesfield Town in the 1930s.

== Career ==
Curley played for Northwich Victoria and Manchester City before joining Port Vale in May 1935. He played 24 Second Division and three FA Cup games in the 1935–36 season, and scored one goal in a 2–1 victory over Charlton Athletic at the Old Recreation Ground on 16 September. The "Valiants" were relegated and Curley fell out of the first-team picture, featuring in just three Third Division North games in the 1936–37 season. He transferred to Colwyn Bay in November 1936, and later moved on to Macclesfield Town but only featured in the opening two games of 1937–38 Cheshire County League season and after spending time in the reserves he returned to Northwich Victoria. Between 1937 and 1940 he played 64 games for Mossley.

== Career statistics ==
Appearances and goals by club, season and competition
Club	Season	League			FA Cup		Total	
Club	Season	Division	Apps	Goals	Apps	Goals	Apps	Goals
Manchester City	1934–35	First Division	0	0	0	0	0	0
Port Vale	1935–36	Second Division	24	1	3	0	27	1
Port Vale	1936–37	Third Division North	3	0	0	0	3	0
Port Vale	Total		27	1	3	0	30	1
Macclesfield Town	1937–38	Cheshire County League	2	0	0	0	2	0
