= Arthur Ford (footballer, born 1911) =

English footballer

Personal information
- Full name: Arthur Ford
- Date of birth: 1911
- Place of birth: Wolstanton, England
- Position: Inside left

Youth career
- Wolverhampton Wanderers

Senior career*
Years	Team	Apps	(Gls)
1937	Port Vale	3	(0)
1937–1938	Wolverhampton Wanderers	0	(0)
1938–1939	Northampton Town	0	(0)
Total		3	(0)
- * Club domestic league appearances and goals

Arthur Ford (born 1911, date of death unknown) was an English footballer who played at inside-left for Wolverhampton Wanderers, Port Vale, and Northampton Town.

== Career ==
Ford played for Wolverhampton Wanderers before joining Port Vale as an amateur in October 1936. He signed professional forms at the Old Recreation Ground in January 1937. He played three Third Division North games and one cup game from March 1937 to the end of the season, before transferring back to Wolves in September 1937. He later moved on to Northampton Town.

== Career statistics ==
Appearances and goals by club, season and competition
Club	Season	League			FA Cup		Other		Total	
Club	Season	Division	Apps	Goals	Apps	Goals	Apps	Goals	Apps	Goals
Port Vale	1936–37	Third Division North	3	0	0	0	1	0	4	0
Port Vale	1937–38	Third Division North	0	0	0	0	0	0	0	0
Port Vale	Total		3	0	0	0	1	0	4	0
Wolverhampton Wanderers	1937–38	First Division	0	0	0	0	0	0	0	0
Northampton Town	1938–39	Third Division South	0	0	0	0	0	0	0	0
Career total			3	0	0	0	1	0	4	0
