= Roger Jones (footballer, born 1902) =

English footballer (1902-1967)

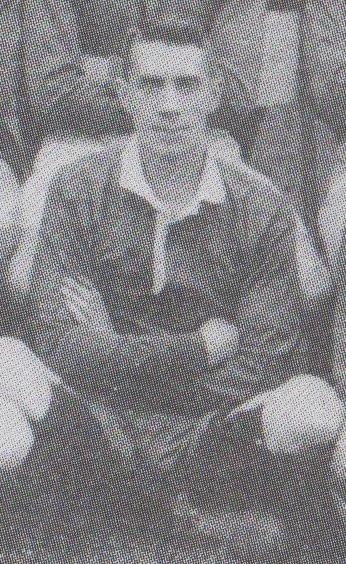
- Jones in 1929

Personal information
- Full name: Reginald Jones
- Date of birth: 1 September 1902
- Place of birth: Burslem, England
- Date of death: 11 December 1967 (aged 65)
- Place of death: Bradeley, England
- Height: 5 ft 7 1/2 in (1.71 m)
- Position: Left-half

Youth career
- Middleport
- Ravensdale

Senior career*
Years	Team	Apps	(Gls)
1923–1937	Port Vale	326	(19)
Total		326	(19)
- * Club domestic league appearances and goals

Reginald "Roger" Jones (1 September 1902 – 11 December 1967) was an English footballer who played at left-half for Port Vale from 1923 to 1937. He made 346 appearances, 326 of which came in league games in the Football League. He helped the club to win the Third Division North title in 1929–30.

== Career ==
Jones played for minor non-League sides Middleport and Ravensdale before joining Port Vale in July 1923. He made his Second Division debut in the 1923–24 season, but remained a bit-part player in 1924–25, 1925–26, 1926–27, and 1927–28. He scored his first senior goal on 10 March 1928, in a 3–1 win over Southampton at The Dell. He hit four goals in 19 games in 1928–29, including two in an 8–1 demolition of West Bromwich Albion at the Old Recreation Ground on 9 March. Despite this comprehensive victory, Vale lost 17 of their 21 away games and were relegated at the end of the season.

Vale rebounded straight away by winning the Third Division North title in 1929–30, with Jones featuring in 38 league games throughout the campaign. His championship medal was valued at an auction in 2020 at £1,000. The 1930–31 season was the club's most successful in terms of league position, as Vale finished fifth in the Second Division, just three places and seven points short of promotion into the First Division. He struck two goals in 28 games in 1931–32, with both of his goals coming in a 2–2 draw with Millwall at The Den on 3 October.

Jones featured 41 times in 1932–33, 29 times in 1933–34, and 30 times in 1934–35. He scored once in 38 appearances in 1935–36, as the "Valiants" were relegated; Vale had finished just one point behind Barnsley, who avoided the drop. Jones was released at the end of the 1936–37 season. Ironically, he had just posted his most prolific season, scoring nine goals in 39 games, including hat-tricks against Mansfield Town and Halifax Town.

== Career statistics ==
Appearances and goals by club, season and competition
Season	Club	League			FA Cup		Other		Total	
Season	Club	Division	Apps	Goals	Apps	Goals	Apps	Goals	Apps	Goals
Port Vale	1923–24	Second Division	1	0	1	0	0	0	2	0
Port Vale	1924–25	Second Division	11	0	2	0	0	0	13	0
Port Vale	1925–26	Second Division	8	0	0	0	0	0	8	0
Port Vale	1926–27	Second Division	7	0	0	0	0	0	7	0
Port Vale	1927–28	Second Division	8	1	0	0	0	0	8	1
Port Vale	1928–29	Second Division	18	4	1	0	0	0	19	4
Port Vale	1929–30	Third Division North	38	0	3	0	1	0	42	0
Port Vale	1930–31	Second Division	40	1	2	0	0	0	42	1
Port Vale	1931–32	Second Division	27	2	1	0	0	0	28	2
Port Vale	1932–33	Second Division	40	1	1	0	0	0	41	1
Port Vale	1933–34	Second Division	28	0	1	0	0	0	29	0
Port Vale	1934–35	Second Division	29	0	1	0	0	0	30	0
Port Vale	1935–36	Second Division	35	1	3	0	0	0	38	1
Port Vale	1936–37	Third Division North	36	9	1	0	2	0	39	9
Port Vale	Total		326	19	17	0	3	0	346	19
Career total			326	19	17	0	3	0	346	19

== Honours ==
Port Vale

- Football League Third Division North: 1929–30
