= Ernest Breeze =

English footballer

Personal information
- Full name: Ernest Clarence Breeze
- Date of birth: 8 May 1910
- Place of birth: Burslem, England
- Date of death: 2 December 1984 (aged 74)
- Place of death: Biddulph, England
- Position: Left-back

Senior career*
| Years | Team | Apps | (Gls) |
| 1932–1936 | Port Vale | 39 | (0) |
- Shrewsbury Town
- * Club domestic league appearances and goals

Ernest Clarence Breeze (8 May 1910 – 2 December 1984) was an English footballer who played at left-back for Port Vale and Shrewsbury Town in the 1930s.

== Career ==
Breeze joined Port Vale in August 1932. He made his debut in January 1934 and played three further Second Division games in the 1933–34 season. He was a first-team favourite from November 1934, taking over from Jim Kelso, and ended the 1934–35 season with 26 league and cup appearances. He played just ten games in the 1935–36 season, and was released from the Old Recreation Ground in the summer. He moved on to Shrewsbury Town.

== Career statistics ==
Appearances and goals by club, season and competition
| Club | Season | League | | | FA Cup | | Total | |
| Club | Season | Division | Apps | Goals | Apps | Goals | Apps | Goals |
|---|---|---|---|---|---|---|---|---|
| Port Vale | 1933–34 | Second Division | 4 | 0 | 0 | 0 | 4 | 0 |
| Port Vale | 1934–35 | Second Division | 25 | 0 | 1 | 0 | 26 | 0 |
| Port Vale | 1935–36 | Second Division | 10 | 0 | 0 | 0 | 10 | 0 |
| Port Vale | Total | | 39 | 0 | 1 | 0 | 40 | 0 |
