= Corbett Cresswell =

English footballer

Personal information
- Full name: Corbett Eric Cresswell
- Date of birth: 3 August 1932
- Place of birth: Birkenhead, England
- Date of death: 19 May 2017 (aged 84)
- Place of death: Low Fell, England
- Position: Centre half

Senior career*
Years	Team	Apps	(Gls)
- Evenwood Town
- Bishop Auckland
1958–1959	Carlisle United	14	(2)
- Horden Colliery Welfare

International career
1955–1957	England amateur	10	(0)
- * Club domestic league appearances and goals

Corbett Eric Cresswell (3 August 1932 – 19 May 2017) was an English footballer who played as a centre half.

== Early and personal life ==
Born in Birkenhead, his father was England international full-back Warney Cresswell, and his uncle was Frank Cresswell. He was married with two daughters and grandchildren.

== Career ==
Cresswell joined Evenwood Town in 1951, and later played for Bishop Auckland in the 1950s, winning the FA Amateur Cup three times. After a transfer to Manchester United fell through, he played in the Football League for Carlisle United. He finished his career with Horden Colliery Welfare.

Cresswell earned 10 caps for the England national amateur football team between 1955 and 1957.

== Later life ==
He later worked in the furniture business. He died on 19 May 2017, at the age of 84.
