= John Jones (footballer, born 1916) =

Welsh footballer

Personal information
- Full name: John Thomas Jones
- Date of birth: 25 November 1916
- Place of birth: Holywell, Wales
- Date of death: 1978 (aged 61–62)
- Position: Goalkeeper

Senior career*
| Years | Team | Apps | (Gls) |
| 1936–1937 | Port Vale | 3 | (0) |
| 1937–1948 | Northampton Town | 71 | (0) |
| 1948–1949 | Oldham Athletic | 22 | (0) |
| Total | | 96 | (0) |
- * Club domestic league appearances and goals

John Thomas Jones (25 November 1916 – 1978) was a Welsh footballer. A goalkeeper, he was known as "Jones the Cap".

== Career ==
Jones joined Port Vale as an amateur in July 1936 and signed professional forms that December. Working as understudy to Allan Todd, he played just four games – three in the Third Division North and one in the FA Cup. He was given a free transfer in April 1937. He then moved on to Northampton Town and Oldham Athletic.

== Career statistics ==
Appearances and goals by club, season and competition
| Club | Season | League | | | FA Cup | | Other | | Total | |
| Club | Season | Division | Apps | Goals | Apps | Goals | Apps | Goals | Apps | Goals |
|---|---|---|---|---|---|---|---|---|---|---|
| Port Vale | 1936–37 | Third Division North | 3 | 0 | 1 | 0 | 0 | 0 | 4 | 0 |
| Northampton Town | 1937–38 | Third Division South | 0 | 0 | 0 | 0 | 0 | 0 | 0 | 0 |
| Northampton Town | 1938–39 | Third Division South | 15 | 0 | 0 | 0 | 2 | 0 | 17 | 0 |
| Northampton Town | 1946–47 | Third Division South | 31 | 0 | 4 | 0 | 0 | 0 | 35 | 0 |
| Northampton Town | 1947–48 | Third Division South | 25 | 0 | 4 | 0 | 0 | 0 | 29 | 0 |
| Northampton Town | Total | | 71 | 0 | 8 | 0 | 2 | 0 | 81 | 0 |
| Oldham Athletic | 1948–49 | Third Division North | 22 | 0 | 4 | 0 | 0 | 0 | 26 | 0 |
| Total | | | 96 | 0 | 13 | 0 | 2 | 0 | 111 | 0 |
