= Harold Lapham =

English footballer

Personal information
- Full name: Harold Edgar Lapham
- Date of birth: 3 September 1911
- Place of birth: Liverpool, England
- Date of death: 2001 (aged 89–90)
- Height: 5 ft 8 1/2 in (1.74 m)
- Position: Centre forward

Senior career*
Years	Team	Apps	(Gls)
1930–1931	Marine		
1931–1932	Netherton		
1932–1935	Everton	0	(0)
1935–1936	Blackburn Rovers	2	(0)
1936	Accrington Stanley	7	(2)
1936–1939	Wrexham	69	(39)
1939	Barrow	0	(0)
- * Club domestic league appearances and goals

Harold Edgar Lapham (3 September 1911 – 2001) was an English professional footballer who played as a centre forward. He made appearances in the English Football League for Blackburn Rovers, Accrington Stanley and Wrexham.
