= Alfred Dickinson =

Welsh footballer

Personal information
- Full name: Alfred Dickinson
- Date of birth: 17 August 1914
- Place of birth: Saltney, Wales
- Date of death: 1998 (aged 83–84)
- Height: 5 ft 10 in (1.78 m)
- Position: Inside forward

Senior career*
Years	Team	Apps	(Gls)
1934–1936	Everton	1	(0)
1936	Port Vale	5	(0)
1937–1939	Northampton Town	19	(5)
Total		25	(5)
- * Club domestic league appearances and goals

Alfred Dickinson (17 August 1914 – 1998) was a Welsh footballer who played at inside-forward for Port Vale, Everton, and Northampton Town.

== Career ==
Dickinson played for Everton, before joining Port Vale in September 1936. He played five Third Division North games before picking up an injury and returning to Goodison Park the following month. He later played for Northampton Town, and guested for Chester and Wrexham during the war.

== Career statistics ==
Appearances and goals by club, season and competition
Club	Season	League			FA Cup		Other		Total	
Club	Season	Division	Apps	Goals	Apps	Goals	Apps	Goals	Apps	Goals
Everton	1934–35	First Division	1	0	0	0	0	0	1	0
Port Vale	1936–37	Third Division North	5	0	0	0	0	0	5	0
Northampton Town	1937–38	Third Division South	18	5	0	0	0	0	18	5
Northampton Town	1938–39	Third Division South	1	0	0	0	3	1	4	1
Northampton Town	Total		19	5	0	0	3	1	22	6
Career total			25	5	0	0	3	1	28	6
