= Ken Cameron (Australian footballer) =

Australian rules footballer

Personal information
- Full name: Ken Cameron
- Born: 31 January 1934
- Died: 29 March 2005 (aged 71)
- Original team: Geelong College
- Height: 179 cm (5 ft 10 in)
- Weight: 73 kg (161 lb)

Playing career^{1}
Years	Club	Games (Goals)
1954–56	Geelong	22 (0)
- ^{1} Playing statistics correct to the end of 1956.

Ken Cameron (31 January 1934 – 29 March 2005) was an Australian rules footballer who played with Geelong in the Victorian Football League (VFL).
