= Fred Sargent =

English footballer

Personal information
- Full name: Frederick Albert Sargent
- Date of birth: 7 March 1912
- Place of birth: Islington, England
- Date of death: 22 August 1948 (aged 46)
- Place of death: Barnet, England
- Height: 5 ft 8 in (1.73 m)
- Position: Right wing

Senior career*
Years	Team	Apps	(Gls)
1931–1932	Barnsbury		
1932–1933	Tufnell Park		
1933–1934	Northfleet United		
1934–1945	Tottenham Hotspur	93	(23)
1945–1948	Chelmsford City		
- * Club domestic league appearances and goals

Frederick Albert Sargent (7 March 1912 – 22 August 1948) was an English professional footballer who played for Northfleet United, Tottenham Hotspur and Chelmsford City.

Sargent was a right winger who played for Tottenham Hotspur between 1934 and 1945 making 109 appearances (93 league and 16 F.A. Cup) and scored 31 goals for the club. From the 1945–46 season he played for Chelmsford City. Sargent died in 1948 and a testimonial match was played on 20 September that year at the Chelmsford's New Writtle Street stadium between the two clubs he had played for.
