= Archie Burgon =

English footballer

Personal information
- Full name: Frederick Archibald Burgon
- Date of birth: 28 March 1912
- Place of birth: Nottingham, England
- Date of death: 1994 (aged 81–82)
- Position: Outside left

Senior career*
Years	Team	Apps	(Gls)
	Colwick	?	(?)
	Burton Joyce	?	(?)
	Grantham Town	?	(?)
	Newark Town	?	(?)
1932–1933	Notts County	26	(7)
	Grantham Town	?	(?)
1934	Tottenham Hotspur	4	(0)
1935–1938	Wrexham	140	(36)
1939	Carlisle United	2	(0)
- * Club domestic league appearances and goals

Frederick Archibald Burgon (28 March 1912 in Nottingham – 1994) was a professional footballer who played for Colwick, Burton Joyce, Grantham Town, Notts County, Newark Town, Tottenham Hotspur, Wrexham and Carlisle United.

== Football career ==
Burgon played for non League football clubs Colwick, Burton Joyce and Grantham Town before being given a trial at Notts County in 1930. After a spell with Newark Town the outside left returned to Notts County in 1932 where he featured in 26 matches and scoring seven goals. He went on to play for Grantham for a second time before signing for Tottenham Hotspur in 1934. Burgon played a total of four matches for the Lilywhites. In 1935, Burgon joined Wrexham where he went on to make 140 appearances and score 36 goals between 1935 and 1938. Burgon ended his career at Carlisle United where he appeared in a further two matches.
