= Fred Beedall =

English footballer

Personal information
- Full name: Frederick Beedall
- Date of birth: 15 August 1911
- Place of birth: Chesterfield, England
- Date of death: 1976 (aged 64–65)
- Height: 5 ft 8 in (1.73 m)
- Position: Forward

Senior career*
Years	Team	Apps	(Gls)
–1932	Ling's Row Primitives		
1932–1934	Chesterfield	7	(0)
1934–1938	Torquay United	122	(21)
- * Club domestic league appearances and goals

Frederick Beedall (15 August 1911 – 1976) was an English professional footballer. He was born in Chesterfield.
