= Tommy Ward (footballer, born 1913) =

English footballer

Personal information
- Full name: Thomas Edward George Ward
- Date of birth: 18 April 1913
- Place of birth: Chatham, Kent, England
- Date of death: 1997 (aged 83–84)
- Height: 5 ft 10 in (1.78 m)
- Positions: Right-half; forward

Youth career
- 1932–1933: Chatham

Senior career*
Years	Team	Apps	(Gls)
1933–1934	Crystal Palace	7	(0)
1934–1936	Grimsby Town		
1936–1938	Port Vale	38	(18)
1938–1939	Stoke City	5	(4)
1939	Port Vale	12	(4)
1939	Mansfield Town	0	(0)
Total		62+	(26+)
- * Club domestic league appearances and goals

Thomas Edward George Ward (18 April 1913 – 1997) was an English footballer. A right-half and later a forward, he had a six-year career in the Football League from 1933 to 1939, playing for Crystal Palace, Grimsby Town, Port Vale, Stoke City, and Mansfield Town.

== Career ==
Ward played for Chatham before he was signed by Crystal Palace in August 1933. He made nine Third Division South appearances for the "Eagles" before he moved on to Grimsby Town in June 1934. The "Mariners" finished fifth in the First Division in 1934–35 and 17th in 1935–36. Ward departed Blundell Park in June 1936 when he signed with Port Vale. He converted to a centre-forward role in November 1936 and with 18 goals in 32 games in the 1936–37 season was the club's top scorer; during the campaign, he hit hat-tricks past Chester and Gateshead at the Old Recreation Ground. He bagged four goals in 14 appearances in 1937–38. He was transferred to rivals Stoke City in exchange for Harry Davies and a small fee in February 1938. He continued his scoring record from the Third Division North into the First Division, hitting four goals in five league games for the "Potters", including two in a 3–2 win over Manchester City at the Victoria Ground (Stanley Matthews scoring the third). Despite this, he was returned to the "Valiants" in February 1939. He hit four goals in 12 Third Division South games in 1938–39, but was dropped from the first-team in April 1939 and transferred to league rivals Mansfield Town two months later. His career was then ended due to the outbreak of World War II and the subsequent suspension of the Football League.

== Career statistics ==
Appearances and goals by club, season and competition
Club	Season	League			FA Cup		Other		Total	
Club	Season	Division	Apps	Goals	Apps	Goals	Apps	Goals	Apps	Goals
Crystal Palace	1933–34	Third Division South	7	0	2	0	0	0	9	0
Grimsby Town	1934–35	First Division	0	0	0	0	0	0	0	0
Port Vale	1936–37	Third Division North	27	14	1	0	4	4	32	18
Port Vale	1937–38	Third Division North	11	4	1	0	2	0	14	4
Port Vale	Total		38	18	2	0	6	4	46	22
Stoke City	1937–38	First Division	5	4	0	0	0	0	5	4
Port Vale	1938–39	Third Division South	12	4	0	0	3	3	15	7
Mansfield Town	1939–40	–	0	0	0	0	3	3	3	3
