= Roderick Welsh =

English footballer (1908 – 1991)

Personal information
- Full name: Roderick Ernest Welsh
- Date of birth: 26 August 1908
- Place of birth: Newcastle upon Tyne, England
- Date of death: 1991 (aged 82–83)
- Height: 5 ft 8 in (1.73 m)
- Position: Full-back

Youth career
- 1929–1930: Dipton United
- 1930–1931: Annfield Plain

Senior career*
Years	Team	Apps	(Gls)
1931–1932	Durham City		
1932–1935	Portsmouth	1	(0)
1935–1938	Port Vale	64	(0)
- * Club domestic league appearances and goals

Roderick Ernest Welsh (26 August 1908 – 1991) was an English footballer. His great-grandson, Matthew Dallman, also became a professional footballer.

== Career ==
Welsh played for Dipton United, Annfield Plain and Durham City. He played one First Division game for Portsmouth on 6 May 1933. He joined Port Vale in May 1935. He made 20 Second Division and three FA Cup appearances in the 1935–36 relegation season, and broke an ankle at a 1–0 win over Southampton at The Dell on 31 March. He played 17 Third Division North games in the 1936–37 season and then played 27 league games in the 1937–38 season. He was given a free transfer away from the Old Recreation Ground in May 1938.

== Career statistics ==
Appearances and goals by club, season and competition
Club	Season	League			FA Cup		Other		Total	
Club	Season	Division	Apps	Goals	Apps	Goals	Apps	Goals	Apps	Goals
Portsmouth	1932–33	First Division	1	0	0	0	0	0	1	0
Port Vale	1935–36	Second Division	20	0	3	0	0	0	23	0
Port Vale	1936–37	Third Division North	17	0	1	0	3	0	21	0
Port Vale	1937–38	Third Division North	27	0	2	0	2	0	31	0
Port Vale	Total		64	0	6	0	5	0	75	0
