= Cliff Johnson (footballer) =

English footballer (1914–1989)

Personal information
- Full name: Clifford Johnson
- Date of birth: 24 February 1914
- Place of birth: Hessle, England
- Date of death: 22 July 1989 (aged 75)
- Place of death: Hessle, England
- Height: 5 ft 7 in (1.70 m)
- Position: Striker

Senior career*
Years	Team	Apps	(Gls)
1935	York City	4	(2)
1935	Wolverhampton Wanderers	0	(0)
1935–1936	Port Vale	5	(0)
1936–1937	Torquay United	8	(1)
Total		17	(3)
- * Club domestic league appearances and goals

Clifford Johnson (24 February 1914 – 22 July 1989) was an English footballer who played in the Football League for York City, Wolverhampton Wanderers, Port Vale and Torquay United.

== Career ==
Born in Hessle, East Riding of Yorkshire, Johnson worked as a gardener before being invited to play for York City's Yorkshire League team, before being signed by the club as an amateur on 21 February 1935. He made his first team debut two days later, scoring two goals in a 7–3 victory over Crewe Alexandra in the Third Division North, becoming the first player to score two goals for York on their debut. His performance in this match resulted in Newcastle United and Middlesbrough asking about his availability, so York persuaded him to turn professional. He featured for York in four games before joining Wolverhampton Wanderers in March 1935, although he was unable to make a Football League appearance for the club.

He joined Port Vale in October 1935, and he made a "brilliant" debut in a 3–2 home win over Bradford Park Avenue on 2 November 1935. However, he was forced to undergo a cartilage operation after injuring his knee in the next match. He recovered by January 1936. Still, after making three FA Cup appearances in that month and three league appearances in April of that year, he was transferred to Torquay United in June 1936. He made eight league appearances and scored one goal for Torquay during the 1936–37 season. He died in Hessle on 22 July 1989, at the age of 75.

== Career statistics ==
Appearances and goals by club, season and competition
Club	Season	League			FA Cup		Other		Total	
Club	Season	Division	Apps	Goals	Apps	Goals	Apps	Goals	Apps	Goals
York City	1934–35	Third Division North	4	2	0	0	0	0	4	2
Wolverhampton Wanderers	1934–35	First Division	0	0	0	0	0	0	0	0
Port Vale	1935–36	Second Division	5	0	3	0	0	0	8	0
Torquay United	1936–37	Third Division South	8	1	0	0	1	0	9	1
Total			17	3	3	0	1	0	21	3
