= George Daniels (footballer, born 1912) =

English footballer

Personal information
- Full name: George Daniels
- Date of birth: 1912
- Place of birth: Winsford, England
- Date of death: 1984 (aged 71–72)
- Height: 5 ft 11 in (1.80 m)
- Position: Defender

Senior career*
Years	Team	Apps	(Gls)
1931	Leeds United	0	(0)
1932	Altrincham		
1934	Stoke City	2	(0)
1935–1936	Torquay United	49	(3)
1937–1938	Crystal Palace	7	(0)
1939	Hartlepools United	0	(0)
- Carlisle United
Total		58	(3)
- * Club domestic league appearances and goals

George Daniels (1912–1984) was an English footballer who played in the Football League for Crystal Palace, Hartlepools United, Torquay United and Stoke City.

== Career ==
Daniels was born in Winsford and started his career with Leeds United but failed to make the grade and left for Altrincham. He re-entered professional football with Stoke City in 1934 and played two matches during the 1933–34 season. He left for regular football at Torquay United and spent two seasons at Plainmoor making 49 appearances. He later went on to play for Crystal Palace, Hartlepools United and Carlisle United.

After his playing career he held a number of coaching roles, which included spells at Macclesfield Town, Stockport County, Leek United and Stafford Rangers.

== Career statistics ==
Appearances and goals by club, season and competition
Club	Season	League			FA Cup		Other		Total	
Club	Season	Division	Apps	Goals	Apps	Goals	Apps	Goals	Apps	Goals
Stoke City	1933–34	First Division	2	0	0	0	0	0	2	0
Torquay United	1935–36	Third Division South	21	1	1	1	1	0	23	2
Torquay United	1936–37	Third Division South	28	2	1	0	3	0	32	2
Torquay United	Total		49	3	2	1	4	0	55	4
Crystal Palace	1937–38	Third Division South	1	0	0	0	0	0	1	0
Crystal Palace	1938–39	Third Division South	6	0	0	0	0	0	6	0
Crystal Palace	Total		7	0	0	0	0	0	7	0
Career total			58	3	2	1	4	0	64	4
