= George Heywood =

English footballer

Personal information
- Full name: George Heywood
- Date of birth: 12 January 1907
- Place of birth: Clayton, Manchester, England
- Date of death: 7 September 1985 (aged 78)
- Place of death: Guernsey, United Kingdom
- Height: 5 ft 8 in (1.73 m)
- Position: Full-back

Youth career
- 1921–1927: South Salford Lads

Senior career*
Years	Team	Apps	(Gls)
1928–1930	Manchester City	0	(0)
1930–1935	Altrincham	221	(3)
1935–1936	Port Vale	23	(0)
1936–1937	Southport	14	(0)
1937–1938	Hyde United	41	(0)
1938–1939	Northwich Victoria		
1939	Stalybridge Celtic		
1939–1940	Altrincham	0	(0)

International career
1921	England schools	1	(0)
- * Club domestic league appearances and goals

George Heywood (12 January 1907 – 7 September 1985) was an English professional footballer who played in the Football League for Port Vale and Southport.

== Early and personal life ==
George Heywood was born on 12 January 1907 in Clayton, Manchester. His father, Fred, played professional football for Newcastle United and Blackpool. He died of a heart attack on 7 September 1985, whilst on holiday in Guernsey.

== Career ==
=== Early career ===
Heywood played for South Salford Lads from 1921 to 1927 and was capped by England Schoolboys against Wales in 1921. He was spotted by Billy Meredith and signed to Manchester City as an amateur. He played 11 Central League games as left-back for the Reserves and also played for Oldham Athletic Reserves in the Midweek League.

=== Altrincham ===
Heywood joined Altrincham and played two Cheshire County League games at right-back during the 1928–29 campaign. He signed a contract with the club in April 1930, playing the last four games of the 1929–30 season at right-back. He missed just two games of the 1930–31 season, featuring in both full-back positions. He played 50 games from right-back of the 1931–32 campaign, but rejected interest from Football League clubs such as Crystal Palace and Burnley as he was satisfied with his job at the GEC as a mechanical inspector. He missed just three games in the 1932–33 season. He won the Cheshire Senior Cup with the club in 1934, as Altrincham beat Congleton Town 1–0 in the final at Edgeley Park. He also scored his first goal during the 1933–34 season, converting a penalty kick. Altrincham finished second to Wigan Athletic in the 1934–35 season and also reached the semi-finals in both the Cheshire Senior Cup and the Cheshire County Cup; he scored two goals in 55 appearances playing across from former England international left-back Billy Felton.

=== Later career ===
Heywood joined Port Vale for a £250 fee in November 1935. His debut came in a 9–2 defeat to Nottingham Forest at the City Ground. Despite the heavy loss he remained he a regular for the rest of the season, making 21 appearances as the "Valiants" were relegated out of the Second Division. He lost his place soon into the next season however, and was transferred to Third Division North rivals Southport in November 1936. Southport were suffering an injury crisis, and trainer Jimmy Seddon had known Heywood from his time at Altrincham. He spent the 1937–38 campaign with Hyde United, making 41 Cheshire County League appearances and also playing three cup games. He later played for Northwich Victoria and Stalybridge Celtic, before returning to Altrincham. He retired from football in 1940.

== Style of play ==
Heywood was a full-back with pace and tackling ability, as well as passing technique and good positional sense.

== Career statistics ==
Appearances and goals by club, season and competition
Club	Season	League			FA Cup		Other		Total	
Club	Season	Division	Apps	Goals	Apps	Goals	Apps	Goals	Apps	Goals
Altrincham	1928–29	Cheshire County League	2	0	0	0	0	0	2	0
Altrincham	1929–30	Cheshire County League	4	0	0	0	0	0	4	0
Altrincham	1930–31	Cheshire County League	41	1	1	0	6	0	48	1
Altrincham	1931–32	Cheshire County League	41	0	6	0	3	0	50	0
Altrincham	1932–33	Cheshire County League	40	0	6	0	6	0	52	0
Altrincham	1933–34	Cheshire County League	35	1	8	0	5	0	48	1
Altrincham	1934–35	Cheshire County League	42	1	4	1	9	0	55	2
Altrincham	1935–36	Cheshire County League	16	0	5	0	1	0	22	0
Altrincham	Total		221	3	30	1	30	0	281	4
Port Vale	1935–36	Second Division	21	0	0	0	0	0	21	0
Port Vale	1936–37	Third Division North	2	0	0	0	0	0	2	0
Port Vale	Total		23	0	0	0	0	0	23	0
Southport	1936–37	Third Division North	14	0	2	0	0	0	16	0
Hyde United	1937–38	Cheshire County League	41	0	0	0	3	0	44	0

== Honours ==
Altrincham

- Cheshire Senior Cup: 1934
