= Spencer Evans =

Welsh footballer

Personal information
- Full name: Robert Spencer Evans
- Date of birth: 24 September 1911
- Place of birth: St Asaph, Wales
- Date of death: 1981 (aged 69–70)
- Height: 5 ft 8 in (1.73 m)
- Positions: Half-back; wing-half; inside forward

Youth career
- Rhyl Athletic

Senior career*
Years	Team	Apps	(Gls)
- Wrexham
- Rhyl Athletic
1931–1932	Chester	1	(0)
1934	Stoke City	0	(0)
1934–1936	Altrincham		
1936–1938	Port Vale	68	(0)
1938–19??	Northwich Victoria		
1953	Mossley		
- * Club domestic league appearances and goals

Robert Spencer Evans (24 September 1911 – 1981) was a Welsh footballer who played as a half-back for Rhyl Athletic, Wrexham, Chester, Stoke City, Altrincham, Port Vale, and Northwich Victoria before World War II.

== Career ==
Spencer played for Rhyl Athletic (over two spells), Wrexham, Chester, Stoke City (without making a first-team appearance) and Altrincham before joining Port Vale in July 1936. He featured in 34 Third Division North games in both the 1936–37 and 1937–38 seasons. Having fallen out of favour at the Old Recreation Ground, he was given a free transfer to Northwich Victoria in May 1938. He played at Mossley for one season at the end of his career in 1953, scoring nine goals in 23 appearances.

== Career statistics ==
Appearances and goals by club, season and competition
Club	Season	League			FA Cup		Other		Total	
Club	Season	Division	Apps	Goals	Apps	Goals	Apps	Goals	Apps	Goals
Chester	1931–32	Third Division North	1	0	0	0	0	0	1	0
Port Vale	1936–37	Third Division North	34	0	1	0	3	1	38	1
Port Vale	1937–38	Third Division North	34	0	2	0	1	0	37	0
Port Vale	Total		68	0	3	0	4	1	75	1
