= 1938–39 Tranmere Rovers F.C. season =

Tranmere Rovers F.C.
1938–39 season
- Manager: Jim Knowles; Bill Ridding
- Stadium: Prenton Park
- Second Division: 22nd (Relegated)
- FA Cup: Third Round
Team colours

Tranmere Rovers F.C. played the 1938–39 season in the Football League Second Division. It was their 18th season of league football, and they finished 22nd of 22, and were relegated. They reached the Third Round of the FA Cup.

Tranmere won just 6 of 42 matches, the all-time worst record of any team in the Second Division.

== League table ==
| Pos | Team | Pld | W | D | L | GF | GA | GAv | Pts | Promotion or relegation |
|---|---|---|---|---|---|---|---|---|---|---|
| 18 | Southampton | 42 | 13 | 9 | 20 | 56 | 82 | 0.683 | 35 | |
| 19 | Swansea Town | 42 | 11 | 12 | 19 | 50 | 83 | 0.602 | 34 | |
| 20 | Nottingham Forest | 42 | 10 | 11 | 21 | 49 | 82 | 0.598 | 31 | |
| 21 | Norwich City (R) | 42 | 13 | 5 | 24 | 50 | 91 | 0.549 | 31 | Relegation to the Third Division South |
| 22 | Tranmere Rovers (R) | 42 | 6 | 5 | 31 | 39 | 99 | 0.394 | 17 | Relegation to the Third Division North |

Rules for classification: 1) Points; 2) Goal average; 3) Goals scored
(R) Relegated
