= 1928 FA Charity Shield =

- Event: FA Charity Shield
Everton	Blackburn Rovers
2	1
- Date: 24 October 1928
- Venue: Old Trafford, Manchester
- Attendance: 4,000

The 1928 FA Charity Shield was the 15th FA Charity Shield, a football match between the winners of the previous season's First Division and FA Cup competitions. The match was contested by league champions Everton and FA Cup winners Blackburn Rovers, and was played at Old Trafford, in Manchester. Everton won the game, 2–1.

== Match details ==
24 October 1928

Everton	2–1	Blackburn Rovers
Dean	Report	George Thornewell

Old Trafford, Manchester
Attendance: 4,000
