= Adam Mitchell (footballer, born 1908) =

Scottish footballer

Personal information
- Date of birth: 1908
- Place of birth: Prestonpans, Scotland
- Height: 5 ft 8 in (1.73 m)
- Position: Right half

Senior career*
Years	Team	Apps	(Gls)
- Penicuik Athletic
- Heart of Midlothian
- Cowdenbeath
- Bo'ness
1928–1936	Bradford City	143	(12)
- Wrexham
- Doncaster Rovers
- Coxhoe Albion
- Peterborough United
- * Club domestic league appearances and goals

Adam E. Mitchell (born 1908) was a Scottish professional footballer who played as a right half.

== Career ==
Born in Prestonpans, Mitchell played for Penicuik Athletic, Heart of Midlothian, Cowdenbeath, Bo'ness, Bradford City, Wrexham, Doncaster Rovers, Coxhoe Albion and Peterborough United.

For Bradford City, he made 143 appearances in the Football League; he also made 13 FA Cup appearances.

== Sources ==
- Frost, Terry (1988). Bradford City A Complete Record 1903-1988. Breedon Books Sport. ISBN 0-907969-38-0.
