= Ken Cameron (Scottish footballer) =

Scotland footballer (1906–1974)

Personal information
- Full name: Kenneth Cameron
- Date of birth: 4 April 1906
- Place of birth: Hamilton, Scotland
- Date of death: 1974 (aged 67–68)
- Height: 5 ft 9 in (1.75 m)
- Position: Inside forward

Senior career*
Years	Team	Apps	(Gls)
1924–1925	Hamilton Athletic		
1925–1926	Parkhead Juniors		
1926–1929	Preston North End	24	(5)
1929–1933	Middlesbrough	99	(31)
1933–1935	Bolton Wanderers	24	(3)
1935–1936	Hull City	30	(12)
1936–1937	Queens Park Rangers	8	(1)
1937–1938	Rotherham United	0	(0)
Total		185	(52)
- * Club domestic league appearances and goals

Kenneth Cameron (4 April 1906 – 1974) was a Scottish footballer who played in the Football League for Bolton Wanderers, Hull City, Middlesbrough, Preston North End and Queens Park Rangers.
