= 1937–38 Rochdale A.F.C. season =

English football club season

Rochdale
1937–38 season
- Manager: Ernest Nixon; Sam Jennings
- Stadium: Spotland Stadium
- Football League Third Division North: 17th
- FA Cup: 1st Round
- Top goalscorer: League: Jimmy Wynn (20} All: Jimmy Wynn (20)

The 1937–38 season was Rochdale A.F.C.'s 31st in existence and their 17th in the Football League Third Division North.

== Squad Statistics ==
=== Appearances and goals ===
No.	Pos	Nat	Player	Total		Division 3 North		FA Cup		Division 3 North Cup	
No.	Pos	Nat	Player	Apps	Goals	Apps	Goals	Apps	Goals	Apps	Goals
	GK	(England) ENG	Des Fawcett	45	0	42	0	2	0	1	0
	DF	(Scotland) SCO	Tommy Baird	45	0	42	0	2	0	1	0
	DF	(Scotland) SCO	Tom Sneddon	37	0	34	0	2	0	1	0
	DF	(Scotland) SCO	Hugh McLaren	34	1	34	1	0	0	0	0
	MF	(England) ENG	Charlie Robinson	10	0	9	0	0	0	1	0
	FW	(England) ENG	Joe Duff	20	1	18	1	2	0	0	0
	MF	(Scotland) SCO	Alex McMurdo	2	0	2	0	0	0	0	0
	FW	(Scotland) SCO	Micky Burke	9	0	8	0	1	0	0	0
	FW	(England) ENG	Wally Hunt	21	10	18	7	2	1	1	2
	FW	(England) ENG	Harry Marshall	32	6	30	6	1	0	1	0
	MF	(Wales) WAL	Sid Protheroe	32	7	30	7	1	0	1	0
	DF	(England) ENG	Edward Sperry	3	0	3	0	0	0	0	0
	FW	(Scotland) SCO	Alex Graham	12	4	11	4	0	0	1	0
	MF	(England) ENG	Ted Goodier	42	0	39	0	2	0	1	0
	MF	(Scotland) SCO	Frank Wilson	8	1	7	1	0	0	1	0
	MF	(England) ENG	Jimmy Eastwood	31	0	28	0	2	0	1	0
	FW	(England) ENG	Jimmy Wynn	30	20	28	20	2	0	0	0
	MF	(Scotland) SCO	Jock Millar	27	8	26	8	1	0	0	0
	MF	(Republic of Ireland) IRL	Thomas McMurray	25	1	23	1	2	0	0	0
	MF	(England) ENG	Roland Haworth	2	0	2	0	0	0	0	0
	MF	(England) ENG	Bob Hardy	7	0	7	0	0	0	0	0
	FW	(England) ENG	Wilfred Barks	3	0	3	0	0	0	0	0
	DF	(Wales) WAL	Idris Williams	4	0	4	0	0	0	0	0
	MF	(England) ENG	Arnold Sutcliffe	2	0	2	0	0	0	0	0
	FW	(England) ENG	Adam Dawson	12	6	12	6	0	0	0	0

Squad Statistics (Non-competitive)

=== Appearances and goals (Non-competitive) ===
No.	Pos	Nat	Player	Total		Lancashire Cup	
No.	Pos	Nat	Player	Apps	Goals	Apps	Goals
	GK	(England) ENG	Des Fawcett	1	0	1	0
	DF	(Scotland) SCO	Tommy Baird	1	0	1	0
	DF	(Scotland) SCO	Tom Sneddon	1	0	1	0
	DF	(Scotland) SCO	Hugh McLaren	1	0	1	0
	MF	(England) ENG	Charlie Robinson	0	0	0	0
	FW	(England) ENG	Joe Duff	1	0	1	0
	MF	(Scotland) SCO	Alex McMurdo	0	0	0	0
	FW	(Scotland) SCO	Micky Burke	0	0	0	0
	FW	(England) ENG	Wally Hunt	0	0	0	0
	FW	(England) ENG	Harry Marshall	1	0	1	0
	MF	(Wales) WAL	Sid Protheroe	1	0	1	0
	DF	(England) ENG	Edward Sperry	0	0	0	0
	FW	(Scotland) SCO	Alex Graham	0	0	0	0
	MF	(England) ENG	Ted Goodier	1	0	1	0
	MF	(Scotland) SCO	Frank Wilson	0	0	0	0
	MF	(England) ENG	Jimmy Eastwood	1	0	1	0
	FW	(England) ENG	Jimmy Wynn	0	0	0	0
	MF	(Scotland) SCO	Jock Millar	0	0	0	0
	MF	(Republic of Ireland) IRL	Thomas McMurray	0	0	0	0
	MF	(England) ENG	Roland Haworth	1	0	1	0
	MF	(England) ENG	Bob Hardy	0	0	0	0
	FW	(England) ENG	Wilfred Barks	0	0	0	0
	DF	(Wales) WAL	Idris Williams	0	0	0	0
	MF	(England) ENG	Arnold Sutcliffe	0	0	0	0
	FW	(England) ENG	Adam Dawson	1	1	1	1

== Final league table ==
Pos	Team	Pld	W	D	L	GF	GA	GAv	Pts	Promotion
15	Port Vale	42	12	14	16	65	73	0.890	38	Transferred to the Third Division South
16	Southport	42	12	14	16	53	82	0.646	38	
17	Rochdale	42	13	11	18	67	78	0.859	37	
18	Halifax Town	42	12	12	18	44	66	0.667	36	
19	Darlington	42	11	10	21	54	79	0.684	32	

Source: rsssf.com

== Competitions ==
=== Football League Third Division North ===
28 August 1937 1	Rochdale	0–0	York City	Rochdale
		Report		Stadium: Spotland Stadium; Attendance: 8448

30 August 1937 2	Tranmere Rovers	3–2	Rochdale	Birkenhead
	Eden; Mayson; Kearney	Report	Hamilton (o.g.); Marshall	Stadium: Prenton Park; Attendance: 8508

4 September 1937 3	Bradford City	3–1	Rochdale	Bradford
	Hardy; Moore	Report	Protheroe	Stadium: Valley Parade; Attendance: 5997

7 September 1937 4	Rochdale	0–0	Tranmere Rovers	Rochdale
		Report		Stadium: Spotland Stadium; Attendance: 4480

11 September 1937 5	Rochdale	3–2	Southport	Rochdale
	Hunt; Marshall	Report	Atkinson; Patrick	Stadium: Spotland Stadium; Attendance: 5915

13 September 1937 6	Halifax Town	2–3	Rochdale	Halifax
	Hoyland; Jackson	Report	Protheroe; Wilson	Stadium: The Shay; Attendance: 2409

18 September 1937 7	Doncaster Rovers	5–0	Rochdale	Doncaster
	Allen; Killourhy; Perry	Report		Stadium: Belle Vue; Attendance: 10647

25 September 1937 8	Rochdale	1–4	Crewe Alexandra	Rochdale
	Hunt	Report	Johnson; Waring	Stadium: Spotland Stadium; Attendance: 5632

2 October 1937 9	Rochdale	2–0	Rotherham United	Rochdale
	Graham; Wynn	Report		Stadium: Spotland Stadium; Attendance: 5019

9 October 1937 10	Chester	4–1	Rochdale	Chester
	Sargeant; Wrightson; Sanders	Report	Hunt	Stadium: Sealand Road; Attendance: 5913

16 October 1937 11	Barrow	0–1	Rochdale	Barrow-in-Furness
		Report	Graham	Stadium: Holker Street; Attendance: 4332

23 October 1937 12	Rochdale	6–1	Wrexham	Rochdale
	Graham; Wynn; Hunt; Protheroe	Report	Burgon	Stadium: Spotland Stadium; Attendance: 4193

30 October 1937 13	Hartlepools United	3–3	Rochdale	Hartlepool
	Scott; Wigham	Report	Marshall; Protheroe	Stadium: Victoria Park; Attendance: 5087

6 November 1937 14	Rochdale	0–1	Lincoln City	Rochdale
		Report	Callender	Stadium: Spotland Stadium; Attendance: 9074

13 November 1937 15	Hull City	4–1	Rochdale	Hull
	Fryer; McNeill	Report	Wynn	Stadium: Anlaby Road; Attendance: 8848

20 November 1937 16	Rochdale	2–1	New Brighton	Rochdale
	Wynn; Hunt	Report	Mustard (pen.)	Stadium: Spotland Stadium; Attendance: 5295

4 December 1937 17	Rochdale	1–1	Oldham Athletic	Rochdale
	Hunt (pen.)	Report	Davis	Stadium: Spotland Stadium; Attendance: 4460

11 December 1937 18	Darlington	2–4	Rochdale	Darlington
	Clacher; Brown	Report	Wynn; Millar	Stadium: Feethams; Attendance: 1378

18 December 1937 19	Rochdale	1–1	Port Vale	Rochdale
	Wynn	Report	Roberts (pen.)	Stadium: Spotland Stadium; Attendance: 3560

25 December 1937 20	Rochdale	0–1	Accrington Stanley	Rochdale
		Report	Curran	Stadium: Spotland Stadium; Attendance: 9146

27 December 1937 21	Accrington Stanley	0–1	Rochdale	Accrington
		Report	Wynn	Stadium: Peel Park; Attendance: 4700

1 January 1938 22	York City	0–5	Rochdale	York
		Report	Wynn; Millar; Marshall	Stadium: Bootham Crescent; Attendance: 5971

8 January 1938 23	Gateshead	3–1	Rochdale	Gateshead
	Smith; McDermott	Report	Protheroe	Stadium: Redheugh Park; Attendance: 9504

15 January 1938 24	Rochdale	2–0	Bradford City	Rochdale
	Protheroe; Wynn	Report		Stadium: Spotland Stadium; Attendance: 3234

22 January 1938 25	Southport	2–0	Rochdale	Southport
	Hampson	Report		Stadium: Haig Avenue; Attendance: 3832

29 January 1938 26	Rochdale	4–5	Doncaster Rovers	Rochdale
	Millar; Marshall; Wynn	Report	Malam; Killourhy; Little; McFarlane	Stadium: Spotland Stadium; Attendance: 5069

5 February 1938 27	Crewe Alexandra	5–1	Rochdale	Crewe
	Chandler; Foster; Tagg; Waring	Report	McLaren	Stadium: Gresty Road; Attendance: 3393

12 February 1938 28	Rotherham United	1–0	Rochdale	Rotherham
	Smith	Report		Stadium: Millmoor; Attendance: 9282

19 February 1938 29	Rochdale	4–0	Chester	Rochdale
	Wynn (pen.); Dawson; Millar; Done (o.g.)	Report		Stadium: Spotland Stadium; Attendance: 5728

26 February 1938 30	Rochdale	3–3	Barrow	Rochdale
	McMurray; Dawson	Report	Mullaney; McIntosh	Stadium: Spotland Stadium; Attendance: 6243

5 March 1938 31	Wrexham	2–1	Rochdale	Wrexham
	Burditt; Raven	Report	Tunney (o.g.)	Stadium: Racecourse Ground; Attendance: 3620

12 March 1938 32	Rochdale	2–2	Hartlepools United	Rochdale
	Dawson; Protheroe	Report	Self; Nevin	Stadium: Spotland Stadium; Attendance: 5615

19 March 1938 33	Lincoln City	2–0	Rochdale	Lincoln
	Deacon	Report		Stadium: Sincil Bank; Attendance: 6836

26 March 1938 34	Rochdale	0–0	Hull City	Rochdale
		Report		Stadium: Spotland Stadium; Attendance: 5761

2 April 1938 35	New Brighton	2–0	Rochdale	New Brighton
	Wood; Shiels	Report		Stadium: Sandheys Park; Attendance: 3419

9 April 1938 36	Rochdale	2–2	Gateshead	Rochdale
	Wynn; Millar	Report	Thompson	Stadium: Spotland Stadium; Attendance: 5240

15 April 1938 37	Rochdale	3–1	Carlisle United	Rochdale
	Wynn (pen.); Millar	Report	Temple	Stadium: Spotland Stadium; Attendance: 4648

16 April 1938 38	Oldham Athletic	4–2	Rochdale	Oldham
	Gray; Ferrier; Diamond	Report	Duff; Eaves (o.g.)	Stadium: Boundary Park; Attendance: 17106

18 April 1938 39	Carlisle United	0–1	Rochdale	Carlisle
		Report	Dawson	Stadium: Brunton Park; Attendance: 5609

23 April 1938 40	Rochdale	1–1	Darlington	Rochdale
	Dawson	Report	Harris (pen.)	Stadium: Spotland Stadium; Attendance: 4028

30 April 1938 41	Port Vale	4–1	Rochdale	Stoke-on-Trent
	Masters; Roberts; Bellis	Report	Wynn (pen.)	Stadium: Old Recreation Ground; Attendance: 2992

7 May 1938 42	Rochdale	1–1	Halifax Town	Rochdale
	Craig (o.g.)	Report	Griffiths	Stadium: Spotland Stadium; Attendance: 2065

=== F.A. Cup ===
27 November 1937 1	Rochdale	1–1	Lincoln City	Rochdale
	Hunt	Report	Deacon	Stadium: Spotland Stadium; Attendance: 11500

1 December 1937 1	Lincoln City	2–0	Rochdale	Lincoln
	Campbell; Whyte	Report		Stadium: Sincil Bank; Attendance: 6474

=== Division 3 North Cup ===
21 September 1937 1	Rochdale	2–3	Oldham Athletic	Rochdale
	Hunt		Robbins; Blackshaw	Stadium: Spotland Stadium; Attendance: 1000

=== Lancashire Cup ===
18 April 1938 1	Blackburn Rovers	4–1	Rochdale	Blackburn
	Goal		Dawson	Stadium: Ewood Park
