= List of Crewe Alexandra F.C. players =

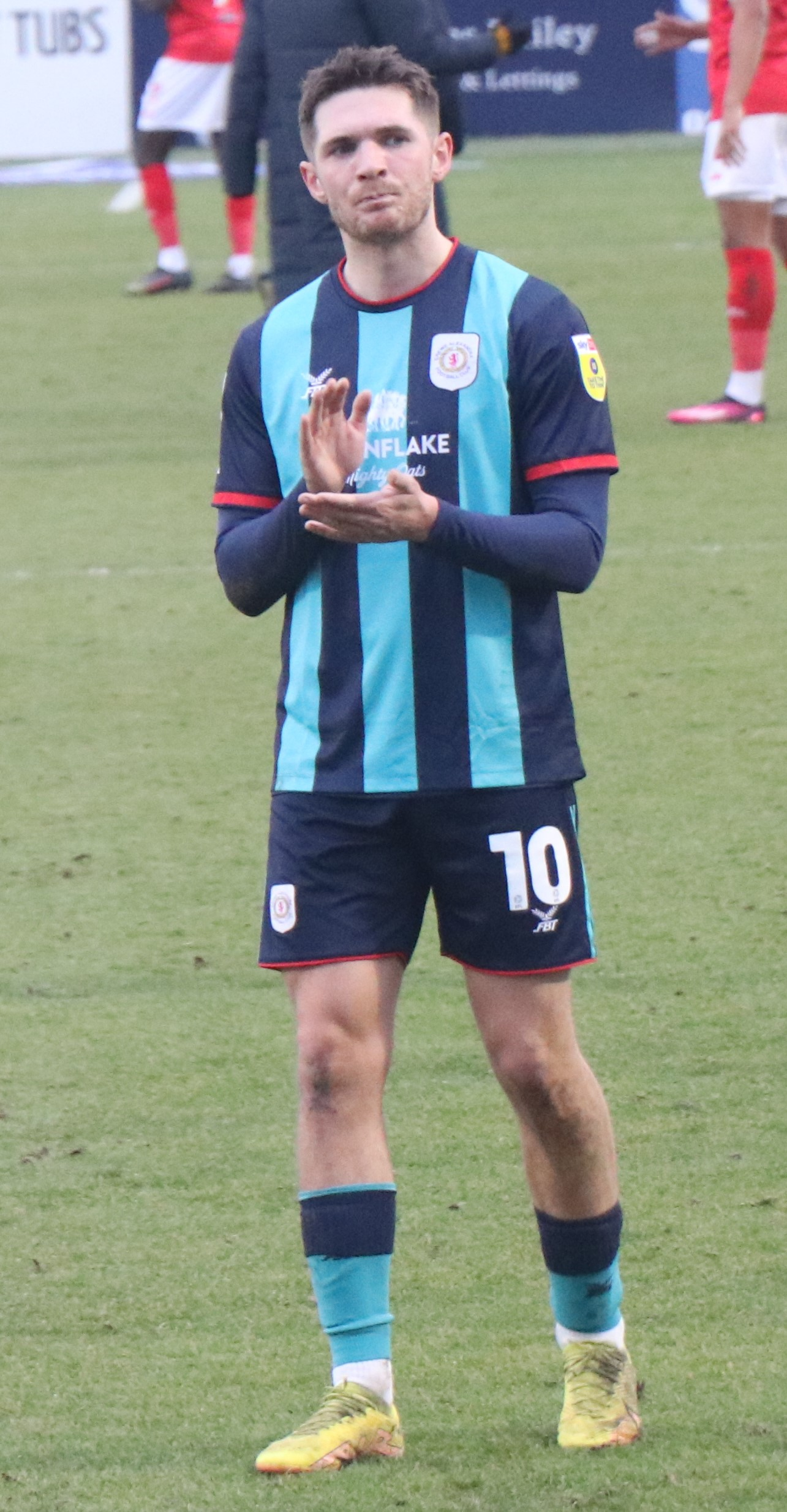
Callum Ainley was the most recent Crewe player to top 250 appearances, passing the milestone in August 2022.

This is a list of notable footballers who have played for Crewe Alexandra F.C. Generally, this means players that have played 100 or more first-class matches for the club. However, some players who fell just short of the 100 total but made significant contributions to the club's history are also included.

For a list of all Crewe Alexandra players, major or minor, with a Wikipedia article, see Category:Crewe Alexandra F.C. players. For player appearance records see List of Crewe Alexandra F.C. records and statistics and for the current squad see the main Crewe Alexandra F.C. article.

== List of players ==
(Current Crewe players shown in bold, totals as of 10 November 2026)

Name	Nationality	Position	Crewe Alexandra career	Appearances	Goals
Tommy Lowry	England	FB	1966–1978	482	3
Peter Leigh	England	FB	1961–1972	473	2
Shaun Smith	England	FB	1991–2002	466	52
Kenny Lunt	England	MF	1997–2006, 2008	436	37
Eric Barnes	England	CB	1958–1969	390	2
Alan Bradshaw	England	MF	1965–1971	323	51
Steve Macauley	England	CB	1992–2002	317	27
John Meaney	England	FB	1946–1953	288	38
Byron Moore	England	FW	2007–2014	297	33
Mark Rivers	England	FW	1994–2001, 2004–2006	295	69
Neil Sorvel	England	MF	1999–2005	283	13
Geoff Crudgington	England	GK	1972–1977	280	0
Callum Ainley	England	MF	2015–2023	278	20
Stan Keery	England	MF/ST	1958–1965	277	24
Luke Murphy	England	MF	2008–2013, 2020–2022	272	26
Barrie Wheatley	England	FW	1957–1966	272	58
Bert Swindells	England	FW	1927–1937	269	139
Bob Scott	England	CB	1979–1986	261	17
Bernard Purdie	Wales	ST	1973–1979, 1982–1983	255	44
Dean Greygoose	England	GK	1987–1993	251	0
Ben Garratt	England	GK	2010–2019	246	0
Stephen Foster	England	CB	1997–2006	242	18
Mark Gardiner	England	MF/ST	1988–1995	241	42
David Wright	England	RB	1997–2004	240	3
Johnny King	England	ST	1949–1953, 1962–1967	238	60
Willie Mailey	Scotland	GK	1963–1970	239	0
Peter Ellson	England	GK	1949–1956	234	0
Gareth Whalley	England	MF	1992–1997, 2002	232	17
Mick Gannon	England	FB	1964–1970	228	2
Shaun Miller	England	ST	2006–2012, 2018–2020	227	52
Matt Tootle	England	DF	2009–2015	224	3
Charlie Kirk	England	FW	2016–2021, 2024	222	32
Rodney Jack	St. Vincent	FW	1998–2003, 2006–2007	221	45
Jason Kearton	Australia	GK	1996–2001	220	0
Colin Little	England	ST	1996–2003	220	45
Jimmy McGuigan	Scotland	W	1950–1956	217	34
Gerry Humphreys	Wales	ST	1972–1977	214	30
David Davies	Wales	W	1974–1981	209	26
David Vaughan	Wales	MF	2000–2007	209	20
Harry Davis	England	DF	2009–2017	208	13
Keith Stott	England	HB	1964–1970	208	11
Tom Briggs	England	FB	1949–1956	202	2
Ray Lugg	England	MF	1973–1978	202	12
Rob Edwards	England	DF/MF	1988–1996	198	58
Paul Bowles	England	DF	1975–1979	195	17
Alf Lees	England	CB	1951–1956	192	5
Tom Lowery	Wales	MF	2016–2022, 2025	192	15
Ollie Turton	England	DF	2009–2017	190	4
**Luke Offord**	England	DF	2019–2024, 2026–	189	4
Chris Porter	England	ST	2017–2022	189	54
Dennis Nelson	Scotland	ST	1974–1976, 1978–1981	188	34
Dave Waller	England	FW	1982–1986	188	66
**James Jones**	Scotland	MF	2014–2019, 2026–	186	12
Ryan Wintle	England	MF	2015–2021	186	11
Phil Charnock	England	MF	1996–2002	183	8
George Gilchrist	England	FB	1934–1946	182	0
Perry Ng	England	FB	2015–2021	182	7
Frank Mitcheson	England	ST	1948–1954	181	34
Neil Lennon	Northern Ireland	MF	1990–1996	178	16
Tony Waddington	England	FB	1946–1953	178	8
Dean Ashton	England	ST	2000–2005	177	74
Steve Jones	Northern Ireland	FW	2001–2006, 2008	177	46
Danny Murphy	England	MF	1994–1997, 1999	176	33
Phil Nicholls	England	DF	1972–1979	176	8
Danny Bowers	England	FB	1979–1984	175	2
Steve Walters	England	MF	1989–1996	173	11
Paul Bevan	Wales	DF	1975–1980	172	7
Dave Walton	England	CB	1997–2003	171	3
Don Campbell	England	DF	1958–1962	170	1
Wayne Collins	England	MF	1993–1996, 2001–2003	170	19
Jackie Waring	England	W	1934–1939	170	67
Harry Pickering	England	DF	2016–2021	168	10
Aaron Callaghan	Republic of Ireland	DF	1985–1986, 1988–1992	166	6
Craig Hignett	England	MF/ST	1985–1992, 2004	165	57
Ben Rix	England	MF	2001–2009	159	6
Chris Cutler	England	ST	1985–1989	156	26
Roy Gater	England	FB	1968–1973	156	5
Gary Blissett	England	ST	1983–1987, 1996	155	40
Chris Riley	Wales	ST	1958–1964	155	49
Bob Young	England	FB	1948–1952	155	2
Jack Basford	England	ST	1948–1954	154	65
Nigel Hart	England	DF	1982–1987	154	11
Geoff Thomas	England	MF	1984–1987, 2001–2002	154	23
Peter Gowans	Scotland	ST	1963–1967	153	47
Tony Naylor	England	ST	1990–1994	153	63
Lee Unsworth	England	DF	1995–2000	153	2
Dele Adebola	Nigeria	ST	1993–1998	152	46
Billy Haydock	England	ST	1961–1965	152	31
Kenny Swain	England	DF	1988–1992	152	1
Bryan Williams	England	FB	1954–1958	150	6
Lee Bell	England	MF	2002–2008, 2010–2012	148	5
David Platt	England	ST	1985–1988	148	61
Ben Williams	England	GK	2004–2008	148	0
Billy Jones	England	DF/MF	2003–2007, 2021	146	9
Peter Coyne	England	ST	1977–1981	145	49
Steve Davis	England	DF	1983–1988	145	1
Adam Dugdale	England	DF	2006–2007, 2010–2015	143	6
George Cooper	England	MF	2014–2018	142	15
Warwick Rimmer	England	DF	1975–1979	140	0
**Mickey Demetriou**	England	DF	2023–	138	16
Jon Guthrie	England	DF	2012–2017	137	1
Clayton Ince	Trinidad and Tobago	GK	1999–2005	137	0
George Ray	Wales	DF	2011–2019	137	3
**Conor Thomas**	England	MF	2022–	137	6
Rio Adebisi	England	DF	2019–2024	136	6
John Pemberton	England	DF	1985–1988, 1997–1998	136	2
Darren Carr	England	DF	1990–1993	134	7
Dale Jasper	England	MF	1988–1991	134	2
Bradden Inman	Australia	MF	2012–2016	134	24
Kelvin Mellor	England	DF	2010–2014, 2022–2023	134	3
Ashley Westwood	England	MF	2009–2012	133	15
David Pullar	England	W	1983–1987	132	7
**Lewis Billington**	England	DF	2022–	131	1
Rob Hulse	England	ST	1999–2003	131	51
Gary Roberts	England	MF	2004–2008	131	11
Clayton Donaldson	England	ST	2008–2011	130	49
**Matúš Holíček**	Slovakia	MF	2022–	130	6
**Joel Tabiner**	England	MF	2020–	129	5
Julien Baudet	France	DF	2006–2009	127	2
Kevin McHale	England	W	1958–1970	126	23
Andy Sussex	England	DF	1988–1991	125	36
Ashley Westwood	England	DF	1995–1998	125	11
Oliver Finney	England	MF	2016–2023	124	17
Zac Williams	Wales	DF	2022–2026	124	3
Martyn Booty	England	DF	1993–1996	123	6
Fred Keenor	Wales	CB	1931–1934	123	5
Chris McCready	England	DF	2000–2006, 2007–2009	123	2
Ernie Adams	England	GK	1969–1972	122	0
Phil Clarkson	England	MF	1991–1996	122	31
A-Jay Leitch-Smith	England	FW	2009–2014	122	21
Kevin Lewis	England	FB	1979–1982	122	2
Steve Phillips	England	GK	2009–2014	122	0
Dave Whelan	England	FB	1963–1966	122	0
Tony Cliss	England	ST	1982–1986	121	11
Hughen Riley	England	MF	1971–1975	121	9
Peter Billing	England	CB	1986–1989, 1996–1997	120	1
Frank Lord	England	ST	1961–1963	118	73
Mark Palios	England	MF	1979–1983	118	23
Albert Parker	England	DF	1948–1951	118	0
Danny O'Donnell	England	DF	2006–2010	117	4
Efe Sodje	Nigeria	DF	2000–2003	116	4
Richard Walker	England	CB	1999–2006	115	7
Gus Wilson	England	FB	1991–1995	115	0
Geoff Hickson	England	GK	1962–1968	114	0
Aidan Murphy	England	MF	1987–1992	113	13
Brian Parkin	England	GK	1984–1988	113	0
Danny Smith	Scotland	W	1949–1952	110	15
Norman Bodell	England	DF	1963–1967	109	2
Owen Dale	England	FW	2017–2022	109	15
Ray Ferris	Northern Ireland	HB	1945–1949	109	23
Steve Garvey	England	MF	1991–1998	108	8
Paul Edwards	England	DF	1988–1990	108	7
Ryan Lowe	England	FW	2006–2008, 2015–2017	108	27
Dave McKearney	England	MF	1989–1993	108	11
Luke Varney	England	ST	2003–2007	108	35
Alan Kelley	England	FB	1972–1976	107	0
Danny Murphy	England	FB	1951–1954	107	1
Marcus Bignot	England	DF	1997–2000	106	0
Joel Grant	Jamaica	MF	2008–2011	106	18
Bert Llewellyn	England	ST	1958–1960	106	58
Francis Tierney	England	MF	1993–1998	106	12
Chris Long	England	FW	2021–2025	105	30
Zoumana Bakayogo	Ivory Coast	DF	2016–2018	104	1
Pat Morrissey	Republic of Ireland	ST	1969–1971	104	31
Dave Brammer	England	MF	2001–2004	103	6
Mark Gayle	England	GK	1993–1998	103	0
Gordon Wallace	England	FW	1967–1971	103	21
Seth Johnson	England	DF/MF	1996–1999	102	6
Jimmy Rolfe	England	W	1955–1958	101	13
Billy Barr	England	DF	1994–1997	100	6
Paul Fishenden	England	ST	1988–1990	98	31
Merfyn Jones	Wales	W	1959–1961	98	16
Chris Lightfoot	England	DF	1996–2001	98	5
Ken Mulhearn	England	GK	1980–1982	95	0
Robbie Savage	Wales	MF	1994–1997	93	11
Fred Chandler	England	DF/ST	1937–1947	86	22
Ashley Ward	England	FW	1992–1994	76	34
Rob Jones	England	DF	1988–1991	74	2
Ademola Bankole	Nigeria	GK	1996–1998, 2000–2004	70	0
Nicky Maynard	England	ST	2005–2008	59	37
Stan Bowles	England	ST	1970–1971	57	19
Jermaine Wright	England	DF/MF	1998–1999	55	5
Nick Powell	England	ST	2010–2012	55	14
Frank Blunstone	England	ST	1951–1952	48	12
Bruce Grobbelaar	Zimbabwe	GK	1979–1980	24	1
