= Edward Craig =

Edward Craig may refer to:

- Edward Craig (philosopher) (born 1942), English academic and cricketer
- Edward Craig (politician) (1896–1979), Californian politician, 1929–1937
- Edward A. Craig (1896–1994), US Marine officer
- Edward Anthony Craig (1905–1998), British theatre designer, known as Edward Carrick
- Edward Gordon Craig (1872–1966), modernist theatre practitioner
- Edward Hubert Cunningham Craig (1874–1946), geologist and cartographer
- Ted Craig (born 1948), Australian-born theatre director
- Teddy Craig (active 1924–1930), Scottish footballer

== See also ==
- Edward Craig Mazique (1911–1987), African-American physician in Washington, D. C.
- Edward Craig Morris (1939–2006), American archaeologist
- Craig (surname)
