= 2012 Irish Greyhound Derby =

2012 edition of the annual Irish Greyhound Derby race

2012 Ladbrokes Irish Greyhound Derby
- Venue: Shelbourne Park
- Location: Dublin
- Start date: 4 August
- End date: 8 September
- Total prize money: €120,000 (winner)

The 2012 Ladbrokes Irish Greyhound Derby Final took place on 8 September 2012 at Shelbourne Park.

The winner Skywalker Puma won €120,000 and was trained by Frances O'Donnell, owned by Ray Patterson and bred by Paddy Purtill.

== Final result ==
At Shelbourne Park (over 550 yards):

Pos	Name	Breeding	Trap	Sectional	Odds	Time	Trainer
1st	Skywalker Puma	Royal Impact - Dianas Ranger	2	3.45	2/1f	29.39	Frances O'Donnell
2nd	Cuil Cougar	Droopys Vieri - Mays Princess	3	3.36	3/1	29.41 (hd)	Dolores Ruth
3rd	Razldazl George	Kinloch Brae - Razldazl Pearl	1	3.44	9/2	29.65 (3)	Dolores Ruth
4th	Coolykereen Imp	Rumble Impact - Lady Leona	5	3.45	10/1	29.71 (3/4)	John Byrne
5th	Tyrur Sugar Ray	Top Honcho - Maireads Fantasy	4	3.48	7/2	29.78 (3/4)	Conor Fahy
6th	Camas	Head Bound - Accelerate	6	3.49	8/1	29.80 (hd)	Owen McKenna

== Competition Report ==
Dolores Ruth entered her four Razldazl greyhounds for the 2012 Irish Derby still trying to recover from her bad luck experience during the 2012 English Greyhound Derby final. The Razldazl team of Jayfkay, Rioga, Bugatti and her defending champion George led the ante-post betting followed closely by Scottish Greyhound Derby champion Barefoot Allstar, Northern Irish Derby champion Captain Scolari, Champion Stakes winner & runner-up Droopys Jet and Ballymac Vic and the Tyrur brothers Big Mike & McGuigan, the latter was the 2010 champion.

In the preliminary round Razldazl George only finished fourth and Captain Scolari fifth but the pair were lucky because they still qualified for the next round. Ballymac Vic and Tyrur Big Mike both won well but Razldazl Jayfkay was a shock elimination.

After round two Phil Gough's Sparta Maestro became the new favourite after two fast wins but Tyrur Big Mike finished lame and Tyrur McGuigan, Rockchase Bullet and Captain Scolari were all eliminated. There were further surprises in the third round as Sparta Maestro, Barefoot Allstar and Razldazl Rioga were all defeated but Ballymac Vic recorded a fast 29.44 success.

In the quarter-finals Droopys Jet beat Razldazl George by a short head before Laughil Billy won the second in 29.61. Ballymac Vic was eliminated in a troubled heat won by Kilbarry Rover and the fourth and final heat was taken by Tyrur Sugar Ray who set the fastest time of 29.29.

In the semi-finals Skywalker Puma overtook early leader Razldazl Bugatti and pulled clear of the field by over six lengths, Bugatti faded badly finishing last with Camas and Coolykereen Imp qualifying for the final. The second semi was won by Cuil Cougar from Tyrur Sugar Ray and Razldazl George with Droopys Jet failing to get to final.

Skywalker Puma trained by Frances O'Donnell finished the race very strongly to catch early leader Cuil Cougar. Cougar had led for most of the race and just failed to hold off Skywalker Puma who went on to win by a head. Defending champion Razldazl George performed well to take third place but finished lame and retired.

== Quarter finals ==
Heat 1 (Aug 25)
Pos	Name	SP	Time
1st	Droopys Jet	5-4f	29.77
2nd	Razldazl George	5-2	29.78
3rd	Newlawn Tock	5-1	29.85
4th	Razldazl Apollo	7-2	30.23
5th	Clydal Spirit	12-1	30.34
N/R	Stay Thirsty		

Heat 2 (Aug 25)
Pos	Name	SP	Time
1st	Laughil Billy	4-1	29.61
2nd	Razldazl Bugatti	7-2	29.78
3rd	Coolykereen Imp	7-2	30.17
4th	Confident Rankin	6-4f	30.18
N/R	Sawpit Sensation		
N/R	Broadstrand Lad		

Heat 3 (Aug 25)
Pos	Name	SP	Time
1st	Killbarry Rover	5-1	29.97
2nd	Cuil Cougar	4-1	30.04
3rd	Airforce Diva	7-1	30.07
4th	Ballymac Vic	4-5f	30.11
5th	Tyrur Micko	16-1	30.13
6th	Düsseldorf	33-1	30.30

Heat 4 (Aug 25)
Pos	Name	SP	Time
1st	Tyrur Sugar Ray	9-4f	29.29
2nd	Skywalker Puma	5-2	29.60
3rd	Camas	3-1	29.88
4th	Razldazl Luke	10-1	29.92
5th	Bridge Ruth	6-1	30.23
6th	Danmar Benny	8-1	30.29

== Semi finals ==
First Semi-final (Sep 1)
Pos	Name of Greyhound	SP	Time
1st	Skywalker Puma	5-2jf	29.45
2nd	Camas	9-2	29.90
3rd	Coolykereen Imp	8-1	29.91
4th	Laughil Billy	4-1	30.02
5th	Airforce Diva	6-1	30.16
6th	Razldazl Bugatti	5-2jf	30.17

Second Semi-final (Sep 1)
Pos	Name of Greyhound	SP	Time
1st	Cuil Cougar	7-2	29.69
2nd	Tyrur Sugar Ray	2-1f	29.97
3rd	Razldazl George	5-1	30.11
4th	Killbarry Rover	10-1	30.39
5th	Droopys Jet	7-2	30.56
6th	Newlawn Tock	10-1	30.67

== See also ==
- 2012 UK & Ireland Greyhound Racing Year
