= 2012 UK & Ireland Greyhound Racing Year =

2012 UK & Ireland Greyhound Racing Year was the 87th year of greyhound racing in the United Kingdom and the 86th year of greyhound racing in Ireland.

== Summary ==
During May, the GRA announced a bank debt of £49 million under their parent company Risk Capital Partners, Risk had borrowed the money from the IBRC (Irish Bank Resolution Corporation) to buy GRA. The on-going profits of all five tracks only serviced the interest on the debt and it then emerged that a partner in the original GRA takeover with Risk was a company called Galliard Homes. This came to light after plans were drawn up by them to build houses on Wimbledon and Oxford Stadium to reduce the debt. The entire scenario was effectively a disaster for the greyhound industry with the leading greyhound track operator showing intent to end their role in the sport.

Oxford Stadium closed on 29 December, a move regarded as an attempt by the GRA to force the local council into passing future planning submissions.

Paschal Taggart owner of Shelbourne Park revealed plans to buy Wimbledon and redevelop it into a super stadium at a cost of £30 million. This was followed by an announcement from GRA Managing Director Clive Feltham supporting rival plans to end greyhound racing there and let AFC Wimbledon rebuild a football stadium with associated housing.

=== Tracks ===
Norah McEllistrim left Wimbledon for Hove, the McEllistrim ties with Wimbledon dated back to 1929. Brighton had been seeking a replacement for three-time winner of the Trainers Championship Brian Clemenson who had announced his retirement. In addition to McEllistrim, the track would also recruit Dean Childs and Paul Garland. John Mullins returned to Yarmouth and Paul Sallis moved from Hall Green to Monmore.

The GRA released the Grand National out of their control allowing Sittingbourne to host it. A bid by the well-known professional gambler and owner Harry Findlay to re-open Coventry finally went ahead after being licensed by the Greyhound Board of Great Britain. Kevin Boothby took over sole control of Henlow Stadium following Bob Morton's departure.

Clonmel and Tralee earned contributions from the Irish Greyhound Board. Mystery surrounded the closure of independent track Westhoughton Greyhound Track near Bolton, just months before it was due to reopen following a £100,000 facelift. The stadium had undergone £30,000 improvements the previous year and a 20-year lease had been secured by a new owner, but work came to a halt and the site closed.

=== Competitions ===
The blue riband events, the 2012 English Greyhound Derby and 2012 Irish Greyhound Derby were won by Blonde Snapper and Skywalker Puma respectively; both went on to win the accolade greyhound of the year. Nick Savva claimed a surprise Trainers Championship success at Perry Barr; it was the fourth time he had secured the championship.

The youngster Farloe Warhawk impressed during the Laurels winning the event unbeaten before being rested for the winter. The black dog also won the Puppy Derby in August pipping kennelmate Ballymac Eske.

=== News ===
The new Racing Post TV channel (RPGTV) started in February when it featured the heats of the Golden Jacket at Crayford Stadium. The channel had been set up in the partnership of Hills, Ladbrokes, Coral, bet365 and Betfair.

Champion sprinter Jimmy Lollie was retired to stud in June after finishing lame at Hove. Mark Wallis sealed a fourth trainers title.

== Roll of honour ==
Major Winners
Award	Name of Winner
2012 English Greyhound Derby	Blonde Snapper
2012 Irish Greyhound Derby	Skywalker Puma
Greyhound Trainer of the Year	Mark Wallis
Greyhound of the Year	Blonde Snapper
Irish Dog and Bitch of the Year	Skywalker Puma/Milldean Tally

Betfair Trainers Championship, Perry Barr (21 Mar)
Pos	Name of Trainer	Points
1st	Nick Savva	41
2nd	Charlie Lister OBE	38
3rd	Chris Allsopp	37
4th	Seamus Cahill	31
4th	Dean Childs	31
6th	Mark Wallis	30

BAGS/SIS Track Championship, Perry Barr (23 Dec)
Pos	Track	Points
1st	Newcastle	79
2nd	Peterborough	49
3rd	Hove	48
4th	Belle Vue	45
5th	Monmore	35
6th	Swindon	23

=== Principal UK finals ===
Ladbrokes Golden Jacket, Crayford (18 Feb, 714m, £15,000)
Pos	Name of Greyhound	Trainer	SP	Time	Trap
1st	Blue Bee	Matt Dartnall	7-2	45.95	1
2nd	Blackrose Monarch	Eric Cantillon	4-1	45.99	2
3rd	Farley Zach	Kim Billingham	11-4	46.07	4
4th	Lottes Girl	Heather Dimmock	5-1	46.08	3
5th	Wise Signal	Frank Gray	5-2f	46.16	6
6th	Springwood Bob	Barry O’Sullivan	20-1	46.62	5

Bettor.com Scottish Derby, Shawfield (14 Apr, 480m, £25,000)
Pos	Name of Greyhound	Trainer	SP	Time	Trap
1st	Barefoot Allstar	Paul Hennessy	7-4f	28.76	2
2nd	Mill Bling Bling	Kelly Macari	3-1	28.84	3
3rd	Bowtime Sykes	Julie Bateson	7-1	29.08	6
4th	Mill Pegasus	Kelly Macari	4-1	29.22	1
5th	Tudor Prince	Harry Williams	5-1	29.24	4
6th	Droopys Cristian	Elaine Parker	10-1	00.00	5

William Hill Classic, Sunderland (12 Jul, 450m, £25,000)
Pos	Name of Greyhound	Trainer	SP	Time	Trap
1st	Loughteen Blanco	Seamus Cahill	5-1	26.95	3
2nd	Wells Honour	Craig Dawson	2-1	27.30	6
3rd	Droopys Loner	Dean Childs	7-4f	27.46	2
4th	Blue Artisan	Harry Williams	4-1	27.51	1
5th	Holycross Prince	John Mullins	25-1	27.60	4
6th	Mill Bling Bling	Kelly Macari	4-1	27.63	5

William Hill Grand Prix, Sunderland (12 Jul, 640m, £15,000)
Pos	Name of Greyhound	Trainer	SP	Time	Trap
1st	Swabys Princess	Paul Young	6-1	40.49	3
2nd	Dixies Air	Mark Wallis	3-1	40.50	4
3rd	Swift Reagan	Mark Wallis	4-1	40.63	6
4th	Derrane Jake	Jimmy Wright	1-1f	40.64	1
5th	Pond Shefelia	Harry Williams	7-1	40.70	2
6th	Ballintine Molly	Mark Wallis	16-1	40.72	5

Cearnsport Grand National, Sittingbourne (21 Aug, 480mH, £7,500)
Pos	Name of Greyhound	Trainer	SP	Time	Trap
1st	Baran Bally Hi	Derek Knight	3-1	29.53	4
2nd	Faithful Ranger	Arun Green	20-1	29.92	5
3rd	Olivers Twist	Lisa Stephenson	7-4jf	30.27	2
4th	Clonkeen Theo	Jason Foster	10-1	30.41	3
5th	Mullpark Too	Barry O'Sullivan	25-1	30.52	1
6th	Lenson Teddy	Tony Collett	7-4jf	30.70	6

Ladbrokes East Anglian Derby, Yarmouth (20 Sep, 462m, £15,000)
Pos	Name of Greyhound	Trainer	SP	Time	Trap
1st	Bubbly Phoenix	Paul Young	4-5f	27.36	5
2nd	Taylors Sky	Charlie Lister OBE	9-4	27.42	1
3rd	Millwards Matt	Paul Young	6-1	27.46	6
4th	Pennys Midas	Ray Pleasants	16-1	27.73	2
5th	Fifis Legend	Chris Allsopp	9-1	28.00	3
6th	Guinness Dusty	Seamus Cahill	40-1	28.17	4

Ladbrokes TV Trophy, Monmore (25 Oct, 835m, £8,000)
Pos	Name of Greyhound	Trainer	SP	Time	Trap
1st	Blonde Reagan	Mark Wallis	9-4	51.98	6
2nd	Storm Pockets	Jason Foster	1-1f	52.04	2
3rd	Aero Gaga	Paul Young	7-2	52.52	3
4th	Pantone Ava	David Mullins	8-1	52.60	5
5th	Lottes Girl	Heather Dimmock	7-1	52.68	4
N/R	Tynwald Tom	Terry Munslow	Lame		1

Ladbrokes Laurels, Belle Vue (13 Nov, 470m, £6,000)
Pos	Name of Greyhound	Trainer	SP	Time	Trap
1st	Farloe Warhawk	Barrie Draper	4-5f	28.26	2
2nd	Longwood Fantasy	Colin Callow	6-1	28.29	4
3rd	Taranis Rex	Kevin Hutton	16-1	28.30	1
4th	Alien Planet	Stuart Mason	3-1	28.36	3
5th	Fridays Daryl	Julie Bateson	12-1	28.54	6
6th	Boher Chieftain	Charlie Lister OBE	10-1	28.86	5

William Hill St Leger, Wimbledon (22 Nov, 687m, £15,000)
Pos	Name of Greyhound	Trainer	SP	Time	Trap
1st	Blonde Reagan	Mark Wallis	5-2f	41.87	5
2nd	Ballyard Buddy	Stuart Mason	11-4	41.98	4
3rd	Droopys Xavier	Claude Gardiner	20-1	42.00	3
4th	Peggys Style	Chris Allsopp	3-1	42.04	6
5th	Musical Gaga	Dean Childs	9-1	42.29	1
6th	Blonde Fletch	Mark Wallis	4-1	42.43	2

William Hill Oaks, Wimbledon (20 Dec, 480m, £15,000)
Pos	Name of Greyhound	Trainer	SP	Time	Trap
1st	Droopys Hope	Liz McNair	2-1	28.83	6
2nd	Skate On	Liz McNair	7-1	28.98	5
3rd	Forest Mollie	Kevin Hutton	25-1	29.10	2
4th	Droopys Loner	Dean Childs	11-8f	29.11	1
5th	Lemon Velvet	Adrian McPherson	4-1	29.21	4
N/R	Aero Scramble	Dean Childs	o/c		3

=== Principal Irish finals ===
College Causeway/Killahan Phanter Easter Cup, Shelbourne (14 Apr, 550y, €25,000)
Pos	Name of Greyhound	Trainer	SP	Time	Trap
1st	Tyrur Big Mike	Conor Fahy	2-1f	29.73	1
2nd	Razldazl George	Dolores Ruth	5-2	29.77	2
3rd	Kingo	Dolores Ruth	12-1	29.81	3
4th	Razldazl Will	Dolores Ruth	9-2	29.93	6
5th	Pablo Supreme	Owen McKenna	4-1	30.05	4
6th	Tyrur Willyjoe	Conor Fahy	6-1	30.17	5

Connolly's Red Mills Produce, Clonmel (6 May, 525y, €20,000)
Pos	Name of Greyhound	Trainer	SP	Time	Trap
1st	Power of God	Pat Curtin	7-2	28.65	2
2nd	Ballybough Hawke	Murt Leahy	8-1	28.82	1
3rd	Airforce Zulu	Paul Hennessy	6-1	29.00	4
4th	Paradise Martini	Pat Buckley	5-4f	29.01	3
5th	Camas	Owen McKenna	3-1	29.08	6
6th	Cashen Mafuma	Chris Houilhan	5-1	29.15	5

Bettor.com Northern Irish Derby, Drumbo Park (23 June, 550y, €25,000)
Pos	Name of Greyhound	Trainer	SP	Time	Trap
1st	Captain Scolari	Ger Holian	4-1	29.67	5
2nd	Ruthless Man	John McGee Sr.	7-2	29.83	2
3rd	Star Head	Brian Macklin	3-1	30.07	1
4th	Devilacare	Tony McCloskey	6-1	30.23	4
5th	Lolos Joe	Ronnie Craven	2-1f	30.39	3
N/R	Royal Patrol	Ollie Bray			6

Sporting Press Oaks, Shelbourne (23 Jun, 525y, €25,000)
Pos	Name of Greyhound	Trainer	SP	Time	Trap
1st	Milldean Tally	John O'Flynn	9-4	28.75	1
2nd	Cabra Millie	Graham Holland	6-4f	28.95	3
3rd	Rockburst Delta	Graham Holland	7-1	29.31	4
4th	Tantallons Kay	Domnik Rennicks	5-1	29.43	2
5th	Solo Star	John McGee Sr.	12-1	29.67	6
6th	Millbank Lola	Padraig Hickey	3-1	32.07	5

Townviewfoods.com Champion Stakes, Shelbourne (21 Jul, 550y, €20,000)
Pos	Name of Greyhound	Trainer	SP	Time	Trap
1st	Droopys Jet	Fraser Black	5-2jf	29.46	1
2nd	Ballymac Vic	Liam Dowling	5-2jf	29.66	3
3rd	Tibetan Skies	Owen McKenna	9-1	29.70	5
4th	Sparta Maestro	Philip Gough	3-1	29.90	6
5th	Razldazl Bugatti	Dolores Ruth	4-1	29.98	4
6th	Razldazl Black	Dolores Ruth	33-1	30.30	2

HX Bookmakers Puppy Derby, Harolds Cross (5 Oct, 525y, €25,000)
Pos	Name of Greyhound	Trainer	SP	Time	Trap
1st	Razldazl Luke	Dolores Ruth	5-2	28.52	5
2nd	Isabels Boy	Gary Silcock	3-1	28.96	2
3rd	Ballyhill Sub	Plunkett Matthews	2-1f	28.98	1
4th	Barefoot Printer	Joe Carey	7-1	29.06	4
5th	Castlelyons Cofi	Eddie Fitzgerald	5-2	29.22	6
6th	Glenardan	Liam Kirley	14-1	29.34	3

Connolly's Red Mills Laurels, Cork (20 Oct, 525y, €30,000)
Pos	Name of Greyhound	Trainer	SP	Time	Trap
1st	Knockglass Billy	Graham Holland	2-1f	28.30	1
2nd	Razldazl Rioga	Dolores Ruth	3-1	28.90	6
3rd	Boherna House	Richard Wheeler	3-1	28.98	4
4th	Confident Rankin	Owen McKenna	7-2	29.26	3
5th	Allen Master	Marie Gilbert	7-1	29.34	2
6th	Tinas Nova	Sean Muldoon	14-1	29.46	5

Kerry Agribusiness Irish St Leger, Limerick (23 Nov, 550y, €25,000)
Pos	Name of Greyhound	Trainer	SP	Time	Trap
1st	Cashen Mafuma	Chris Houlihan	8-1	29.57	4
2nd	Priceless Sky	Paul Hennessy	4-6f	29.58	1
3rd	Skywalker Puma	Frances O'Donnell	6-4	29.72	3
4th	Tibetan Skies	Owen McKenna	9-2	29.79	5
5th	Head For Fame	Tommy Bolton	20-1	30.24	6
6th	Kingo	Dolores Ruth	8-1	30.52	2
