= Raikes Park Greyhound Stadium =

Defunct greyhound racing venue in Bolton, England

Coordinates: 53°34′0.92″N 2°24′49.53″W

- Location: Manchester Road, Bolton, Greater Manchester in North West England
- Coordinates: 53°34'00.9"N 2°24'49.2"W
- Opened: 1927
- Closed: 1996

Raikes Park Greyhound Stadium, also known as Bolton Greyhound Stadium, was a greyhound racing track in Bolton, Greater Manchester in north-west England. It is not to be confused with the Westhoughton Greyhound Track, which was another track in nearby Westhoughton.

== Origins and opening ==
The stadium was built in an area of Bolton known as Burnden, very close to Burnden Park. The site was the former location of the Great Lever Colliery.

The stadium opened on Saturday 10 December 1927 and was named Raikes Park after the nearby Raikes Hall and Farm. A stand was constructed on the west side of the stadium. Terraces and kennels were built alongside Raikes Lane to the south with further terracing constructed on the east side. Initially, racing at the track was independent: that is, unaffiliated to a governing body.

== Greyhound racing ==
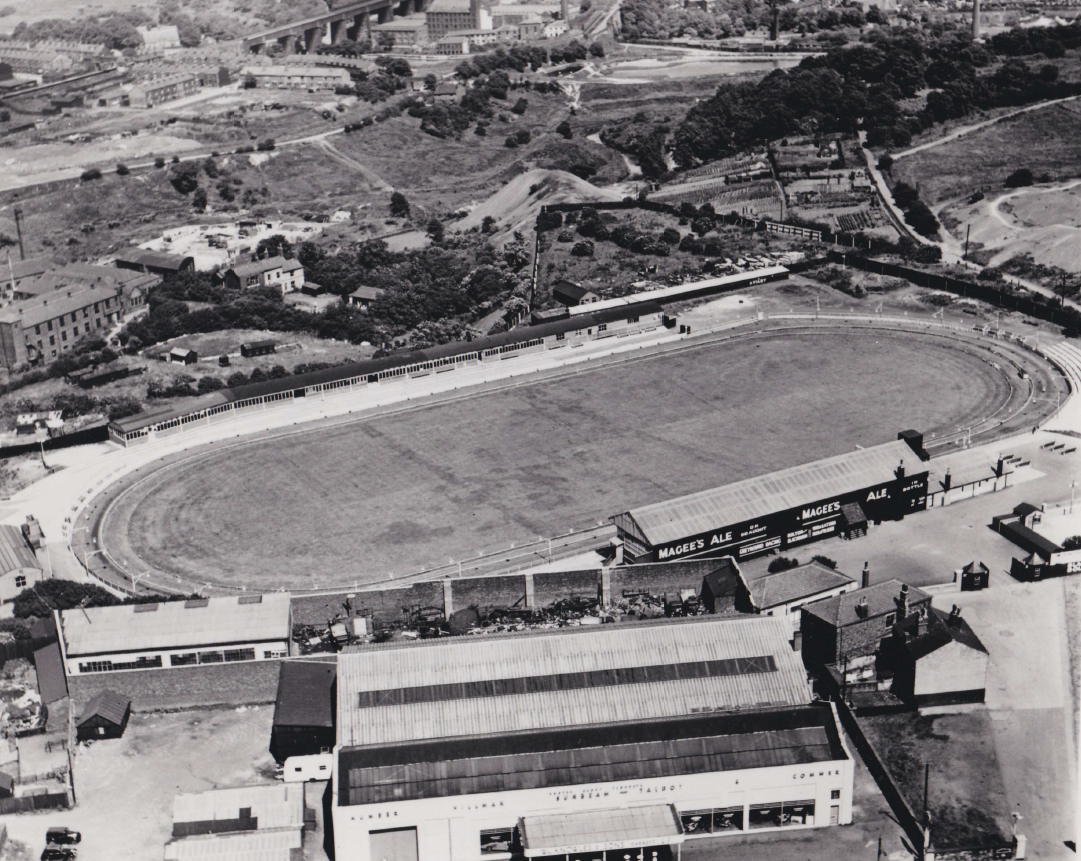
Raikes Park Greyhound Stadium in Bolton c.1950

In 1932 the British Greyhound Tracks Control Society (BGTCS) was formed as a rival to the National Greyhound Racing Club, including Bolton as one of its founding members. The new organisation was established to assist the interest of promoters of mainly northern tracks. When the BGTCS was disbanded, Bolton reverted to being independent.

After World War II, a neighbouring chimney being demolished by steeplejacks fell and landed on the greyhound tracks kennels causing significant damage. Fred Dibnah witnessed the event watching from the allotments south of Raikes Lane; motivated by the event he became a steeplejack.

In 1958, the track switched once again to NGRC racing for a short period before reverting to independent status soon after for a third time. In the 1960s, the track had a 440-yard circumference with distances of 313, 535, 745 & 980 yards, and raced on Wednesday & Saturday nights at 7.45pm. It was considered the leading independent track and introduced an independent Derby over 535 yards which was one of the biggest events in the independent calendar. Track bookmaker Herbert Westwell was chosen to open the new £10,000 extension in 1969 as reward for his long service at the track.

In 1977, the track's fifty year anniversary was celebrated by the Bolton Greyhound Racing Co. Ltd at a special meeting; 'The Jinx' won the first race (a handicap). In the 1980s Monday nights were added to the schedule during summer months and the track was converted to all-sand with an inside hare. Facilities included sixty kennels and three bars and a main stand.

== Speedway ==
A Bolton speedway team were formed and ran for two years in 1928 and 1929. They joined the inaugural 1929 Speedway English Dirt Track League but withdrew mid-season and had their results expunged.

There is also evidence of stock car racing held at the venue.

== Final years and closure ==
In 1987 the track was sold to developers, but this decision was overturned in 1990. Under the supervision of Racing Manager Peter O’Dowd, one last attempt at NGRC racing was made in May 1995, but racing only lasted until 23 December 1996.

The stadium was closed and demolished and the site today is land between car dealerships.
