= Cliss =

Cliss is a surname. Notable people with the surname include:

- David Cliss (born 1939), English footballer
- Tony Cliss (born 1959), English footballer
