= William Temple =

William Temple may refer to:

- Sir William Temple (logician) (1555–1627), English Ramist logician and Provost of Trinity College, Dublin
- Sir William Temple, 1st Baronet (1628–1699), English diplomat, politician and essayist, employer of Jonathan Swift
- William Johnson Temple (1739–1796), English cleric and essayist, a correspondent of James Boswell
- William Temple (politician) (1814–1863), American merchant and Governor of Delaware
- William Temple (VC) (1833–1919), Irish recipient of the Victoria Cross
- William Chase Temple (1862–1917), American coal and lumber baron, owner of the Pittsburgh Pirates
- William Temple (bishop) (1881–1944), Archbishop of York and Archbishop of Canterbury
- William Horace Temple (1899–1988), Canadian temperance crusader, businessman, CCF member of the Ontario Legislature, 1948–1951
- William F. Temple (1914–1989), British science fiction writer
- Bill Temple (footballer), (1914–2006), English footballer
