= List of people educated at Glenalmond College =

This is a list of former pupils of Glenalmond College in Perthshire, Scotland. They are known in some circles as "Old Glenalmonds".

== A ==
- John Adams (Royal Navy officer)
- David Anderson (judge)
- John Archibald
- Ian Campbell, 12th Duke of Argyll
- Torquhil Campbell, 13th Duke of Argyll
- Phil Ashby

== B ==
- Anthony Babington (politician)
- Leslie Banks
- H. M. Bateman, Cartoonist
- Dennison Berwick
- Sir Ernley Robertson Hay Blackwell – lawyer and civil servant
- Crispin Bonham-Carter
- Carly Booth
- Victor Bruce, 9th Earl of Elgin – Viceroy of India
- Alick Buchanan-Smith – politician
- Turtle Bunbury, historian and author

== C ==
- John Cameron, Lord Abernethy
- Dallas Campbell
- Duncan Campbell – journalist and author
- Torquhil Campbell, 13th Duke of Argyll
- Alexander Cockburn
- Andrew Cockburn
- Patrick Cockburn
- Robbie Coltrane
- Sir Ninian Comper
- Edward Hubert Cunningham Craig FRSE geologist and cartographer
- Sir James Crichton-Browne – Lord Chancellor's Visitor in Lunacy 1875 – 1922
- James Cuthbertson – poet

== D ==
- Logie Danson
- Beauchamp Duff

== E ==
- Victor Bruce, 9th Earl of Elgin
- Derek Emslie, Lord Kingarth
- Nigel Emslie, Lord Emslie, former judge on the Supreme Courts of Scotland

== F ==
- Charles Falconer, Baron Falconer of Thoroton – former Lord Chancellor and Secretary of State for Constitutional Affairs
- John Fauvel – historian of mathematics
- Mark Fellowes - International DJ, drummer and record producer

== G ==
- Sandy Gall – former ITN newscaster
- Christopher Geidt
- Georg Friedrich, Prince of Prussia
- Sir John Gilmour, 2nd Baronet – politician
- Francis Gregory (bishop)

== H ==
- Dougie Hall – rugby player
- Jonathan Hammond – Olympic shooter
- John Hannah (Dean of Chichester)
- Patrick Hodge, Lord Hodge
- Gerald Howat – historian, teacher and cricket writer

== J ==
- William Milbourne James
- Rupert Jeffcoat
- Alister Jack

== K ==
- Phil Kay – comedian
- J. D. Kellie-MacCallum
- James Kennaway – novelist
- Miles Kington – writer and humorist
- William Kington – cricketer
- Norman Boyd Kinnear

== L ==
- Graham Laidler - 'Pont of Punch' - cartoonist
- David Leslie – rugby player
- David Litchfield – writer
- Schomberg Kerr, 9th Marquess of Lothian
- Maurice Lyell
- Joseph Leycester Lyne – preacher

Sir Charles Stewart Loch - Secretary of the Charity Organisation Society

== M ==
- Malcolm MacColl – clergyman and publicist
- Andrew Macdonald (producer)
- Kevin Macdonald – film director
- Henry Macintosh
- Thomas Mackay
- Alastair Mackenzie – actor
- Hugh Malcolm
- Alexander Mann – German bobsledder
- Alex Massie (journalist)
- Allan Massie – journalist and writer
- Frederick Matheson
- William Matthews (engineer)
- Duncan Menzies, Lord Menzies
- John Michie – actor
- Reginald Mitchell-Innes
- Ander Monro – rugby player
- Brian Moser - documentary filmmaker
- James Wolfe-Murray

== P ==
- Duncan Vernon Pirie
- Gilbert E. Primrose
- Sir Henry Primrose (1846–1923), Scottish civil servant who became chairman of the board of Inland Revenue
- John Purvis – Conservative MEP
- James Paterson - Scotland Rifle shooter

== R ==
- Keith Raffan
- George Rickey – sculptor
- Walter Robberds
- James Robertson (novelist)
- Michael Rodd – TV presenter
- Vincent Rorison
- Frederick Campbell Rose
- Alex Russell (golfer)

== S ==
- George Sayer
- James Stewart-Mackenzie, 1st Baron Seaforth
- Graham Stuart, politician
- Dr Richard Simpson – Labour Member of the Scottish Parliament and former Justice Minister
- Noel Skelton – politician
- Arthur Wallace Skrine
- David Sole - rugby player
- Dennis Stevenson, Baron Stevenson of Coddenham
- Sir Nairne Stewart Sandeman, 1st Baronet
- Kenneth Strong
- Douglas Sutherland

== T ==
- Hon. Richard Tedder FRCP - virologist and microbiologist
- Adair Turner, Baron Turner of Ecchinswell – businessman, Chairman of Financial Services Authority

== W ==
- Rob Wainwright – rugby player, former Scotland captain
- William Campbell Walker
- Clement Wilson (writer)
- David Wilson, Baron Wilson of Tillyorn – diplomat and colonial administrator
- John Wilson (priest)
- John Wolfe-Barry
- Francis Wyatt (cricketer)
