= Herbert Hamilton (disambiguation) =

Herbert Hamilton (1895–1918) was an English soldier during the first World War, who became a flying ace.

Herbert Hamilton may also refer to:

- Herbert Harold Hamilton (1906–1951), English footballer
- Lee Herbert Hamilton (born 1931), American politician and lawyer from Indiana
- The Hon. Mr. Herbert Hamilton, one alias of British swindler born John Crowningsfield
- Sir Herbert Hamilton Harty (1879–1941), Irish composer
- Herbert Hamilton Kelly (1860–1950), Anglican priest
- George Herbert Hamilton Bryan (1921–2013), British businessman
- Brian Herbert Hamilton Talma (born 1965), Barbadian windsurfer

== See also ==
- Hamilton Herbert Druce (1866–1922), English entomologist
