= McMurdo (disambiguation) =

McMurdo is a surname, as well as a name given to many places in Antarctica, including:

== Places in Antarctica ==
- McMurdo Station, a station at the southern tip of Ross Island in Antarctica
- South Pole Traverse, also known as the McMurdo – South Pole highway
- McMurdo Sound, a sound lying at the junction of the Ross Sea
- McMurdo Ice Shelf, a portion of the Ross Ice Shelf
- McMurdo Dry Valleys, a row of valleys in Victoria Land

== Surname ==
- Alex McMurdo, Scottish footballer
- Archibald McMurdo (1812–1894), British naval officer, has many places in Antarctica named after him
- Margaret McMurdo (born 1954), Australian judge
- Wendy McMurdo (born 1962), British artist

== Other uses ==
- McMurdo (crater), a crater in the Mare Australe quadrangle of Mars
