= Hart Common =

Coordinates: 53.542°N 2.546°W

- Location within Greater Manchester
- Population: 353 (2011 Census)
- OS grid reference: SD654071
- Civil parish: Westhoughton
- Metropolitan borough: Bolton
- Metropolitan county: Greater Manchester
- Region: North West
- Country: England
- Sovereign state: United Kingdom
- Post town: BOLTON
- Postcode district: BL5
- Dialling code: 01942
- Police: Greater Manchester
- Fire: Greater Manchester
- Ambulance: North West
- UK Parliament: Bolton West

Hart Common is a village in Westhoughton, in the Metropolitan Borough of Bolton, Greater Manchester, England, lying mainly along the A58 road.

== History ==
Hart Common was once one of the most rural and least populated hamlets which made up the township of Westhoughton. The area's name is taken from a prominent local family, the Harts. The Hart family owned a small estate, which adjoined common land. The first recorded mention of Hart Common as a place name was in 1541 during a court hearing involving the family.

In the 1860s, the population of Westhoughton had begun to increase considerably, rising from around 4,000 to 9,000 since the turn of the century. In the 1870s, plans for large coal mines across Westhoughton were made - notably the sinking of two shafts by the Wigan Coal and Iron Company; one at Eatock Farm, and one at Hart Common. A further increase in population was imminent, and a decision to build a school and church at Hart Common was made by a local Vicar, Reverend Kinton Jacques. Jaques wrote in his memoirs: "As large coal mines were about to be opened by the Wigan and Coal Iron Co. at Hart Common, a district on the west-side of the parish, I foresaw there would be need of a school and room for church services, so I felt it would be well to be prepared, before the workers arrived".

Rows of cottages were built to house the colliery workers. Higher quality terraces were erected on the north side of the A58, either side of Patterson Street, to house the managers. The pits were sunk in 1871, and due to a shortage of labour, many newcomers arrived and settled in the village. The newcomers were said to have "arrived at Crows Nest Siding under a tar sheet", and were said to have a strange lingo. The census from 1881 shows that those living in the cottages had resided from the following areas; Hampshire, Westmorland, Gloucestershire, Herefordshire, Somerset, County Mayo, Cheshire, Prescott, St Helens, Barnsley, Cornwall, Glamorgan, Oldham and Upholland. The villagers did not take kindly to the newcomers, and for many years afterwards the remark "Thi fayther cum fr' under't tar sheet" was enough to start a fight.

== The Hewlett Pits ==
In 1871 the Hewlett pits were sunk by the Wigan Coal and Iron Company. The colliery superintendent's house, 552 Wigan Road, overlooked the entrance to the colliery on Hewlett Street and a cast iron footbridge over the railway. Many men in the district found work in there. During the Franco-Prussian War in the mid-1870s, the miners were able to earn £1 per day, however when the war ended the price of coal fell to 6 shillings per ton and Mr Hewlett called for drastic reductions in the miners' wages. These were strenuously opposed by the miners and a strike ensued. It was then that more workers arrived and settled at Hart Common from further afield, which the villagers did not take kindly to.

By 1896 the Wigan Coal and Iron Company who owned the Hewlett Pits, employed 981 men underground and 182 surface workers.

After a shift the miners would bathe in the tiled Hewlett Lodge. Tiles can still be found within the lodge, although it is now used as a fishing spot.

In 1912 there was a minimum wage dispute at the pits, and soldiers and police were called in to defend the colliery.

The last coal was raised at Hewlett on 1 January 1931. All the main buildings were demolished in 1933. The area was landscaped and returned to pasture in the early 1980s.

A plaque on 552 Wigan Road (now the Saplings Day Nursery) reads: IN MEMORIAM.. ..THE NAMES HERE RECORDED ARE OF THOSE MEN WHO GAVE THEIR LIVES FOR THEIR COUNTRY IN THE GREAT WAR AUGUST 1914 TO NOVEMBER 1918 AS WELL AS THE NAMES OF THOSE WHO OBTAINED MILITARY DISTINCTIONS IN THE WAR.. ..1&2 HEWLETT PITS KILLED..

This is followed by the names of those killed, and the men who received military honours.

== Hart Common Church and School ==
The decision to build a school and church at Hart Common was proposed in the early 1870s by local vicar Reverend Kinton Jacques, due to the sudden increase in population. The vicar stated in his memoir "a well-known Lancashire family, with some members of which I had been well acquainted, lived on this spot, and the father had made, by his persevering industry, a fortune. The thought struck me, "Why not erect a useful momento?" So I got a design drawn by an architect, of the Hargreaves Memorial School, Hart Common, and sent copies to members of the family. The late Mr. William Hargreaves, who lived then at Moss Bank, sent for me, approved of the idea, promised me £500, and said the work should be done. Other members of the family sent me handsome contributions, and the school was taken in hand and finished".

In March 1878, the following announcement was published in the Bolton Chronicle: "A new school is about to be erected at Hart Common. It is to cost £1,000 and to be called the Hargreaves Memorial School. It has also been decided that a curate is to be put in charge of Hart Common. The architect is Mr. R. K. Freeman of Bolton and the contractor is Mr. Chas, Dickinson of Westhoughton".

The school opened on Monday 10 March 1879, with 34 children being admitted. The following headteachers were appointed to Hart Common School; Mr. F.W. Fitznewton (29 May 1882 – 6 March 1896), Mr. T. Billington (9 March 1896 – 28 February 1933), Mr. F. Gibson (1 March 1933 – 30 April 1954), Mr. N.L. Carter (1 May 1954 – 8 August 1958), Mr. E. Rudd (11 August 1958 – 22 December 1961), Mr. L. Rimmer (8 January 1962 – 10 April 1968), Mrs. P.A. Knowles (25 April 1968 - 1996).

The school was closed and relocated in 1996 due to growing pupil numbers. The Bolton News reported: "New houses were springing up over the town and the small Victorian school was unable to provide the space or the facilities needed. Last year the building was so overcrowded that one of the classes was held in part of the hall". St George's CE Primary School was built to replace Hart Common School. The stained glass windows and war memorial panels were transferred to the new school. Hart Common Church Still stands at the site of the old school.

== The Hart Family ==
The first recorded mention of the Hart family dates from 1451, at which time the Harts were a very prominent farming family in the township of Westhoughton. The name of Hart Common derives from the Hart Family. Other memorials of the family exist, such as the Hart's-i-th'Hole farm on Wearish Lane. The first time Hart Common was officially referred to as a place name was in 1541, when Richard Hart, described as "from Hart Common" appeared in the Duchy Court of Lancaster in connection with a lawsuit. A later unrelated hearing from 1565 makes reference to William and Richard Hart from Hart Common. The family name is further mentioned in the Dean Parish Register, which reads "Burial at Dean, 14th September, 1655, Roger Hart of the Hole at Westhoughton". A headstone in Dean Churchyard reads "Here lyeth the body of Mr. James Hart of Hart Common in Westhoughton who departed this life ye 26 day of July 1709 in ye 34 year of his age". Little else is known about the family after the late 1790s.

== Amenities ==
The village retains most of the terraced cottages, with the exception of those beside Jack's Lane, and those on Hart Street which were demolished many years ago. The rubble from the demolition was covered with earth and grassed over, with two hills now standing in their place. The cobbled road of Hart Street leads a children's playground and football pitches.

Hart Common is now well known for its large 18 hole golf course, which was converted from farmland. The 120 acre Hart Common Farm was noted in 1963 to be the only farm in Westhoughton with sheep. The farm was owned by the Hargreaves family, of whom the Hargreaves Memorial School was named after. All the fields had names; Big Meadow, Long Shutts, Sandall, Beanfield, Clear Pit, School Field, and Cow Hey. The farm dated back to 1701. Hart Common Golf Course was opened on the site in 1995. In 2020, Big Bad Budgie scored his course recorded of level par on the par 3 course.

The village is home to Westhoughton Rangers Football Club, who play on playing fields on common land leased for a peppercorn rent from the Hart Common Mission Church Trust. Coleman Milne, manufacturer of funeral vehicles, stretch limousines and other specialist vehicles is located in the village, at the site of the old Messrs W.H.S. Taylor wholesale grocers cash and carry warehouse.

Hart Common once had two public houses (The Hart Common and the Bridge Inn), a post office, a police station, a petrol station, a school, a Co-op shop and grocery, a butchers, two general stores and two other butcher's shops. The Bridge Inn is now an Indian Restaurant. A car showroom stands at the site of the old Co-op. The school, closed in 1995, is now used as a church. The old petrol station is disused. The rest of the amenities have been converted in to houses. The neighbouring hamlet of Marsh Brook reduced in stature, is incorporated into Hart Common. Westhoughton Greyhound Track used to stand at Marsh Brook, but was demolished in 2014. The Weavers Way housing development stands at the site. Marsh Brook borders the adjacent borough of Wigan
