= Alfred McMurray =

Irish cricketer

Personal information
- Full name: Alfred McMurray
- Born: 4 November 1914; Belfast, Ireland
- Died: 30 June 1988 (aged 73); Belfast, Northern Ireland
- Nickname: Fred
- Batting: Right-handed
- Relatives: Thomas McMurray (brother)

Domestic team information
- Years: Team
- 1939: Ireland

Career statistics
Competition	First-class
Matches	1
Runs scored	9
Batting average	4.50
100s/50s	–/–
Top score	5
Balls bowled	0
Wickets	–
Bowling average	–
5 wickets in innings	–
10 wickets in match	–
Best bowling	–
Catches/stumpings	1/–
- Source: Cricinfo, 17 October 2018

Alfred McMurray (4 November 1914 – 30 June 1988) was an Irish first-class cricketer.

McMurray was born at Belfast in November 1914, and was educated in the city at Ormeau Park School. He played one first-class cricket match for Ireland against Scotland at Dublin in 1939. He scored 5 runs in Ireland's first-innings, before being bowled by John Farquhar; in their second-innings he was dismissed by William Dippie for 4, with Scotland winning by 162 runs. Outside of cricket, McMurray worked as a joiner. He died at Belfast in June 1988.
