= Tom Woodward =

English footballer

Personal information
- Full name: Thomas Woodward
- Date of birth: 8 December 1917
- Place of birth: Westhoughton, England
- Date of death: 18 November 1994 (aged 76)
- Position: Winger

Senior career*
Years	Team	Apps	(Gls)
1935–1949	Bolton Wanderers	152	(18)
1949–1951	Middlesbrough	19	(6)
1951–1952	Wigan Athletic	22	(3)
Total		171	(27)
- * Club domestic league appearances and goals

Thomas Woodward (8 December 1917 – 18 November 1994) was an English footballer who played in the Football League for Bolton Wanderers and Middlesbrough.

In the season 1951–1952, he scored 3 goals in 22 appearances in the Lancashire Combination for Wigan Athletic. Woodward had scored 19 goals for Bolton in 169 cup games and leagues.

== Career ==
Woodward made his first team debut against Stoke City in 1936 when he was 18 years old.
