= Paddy Robbins =

Irish footballer

Personal information
- Full name: Patrick Robbins
- Date of birth: 18 November 1914
- Place of birth: Birr, County Offaly, Ireland
- Date of death: 1986 (aged 71–72)
- Height: 5 ft 8 in (1.73 m)
- Positions: Inside forward; outside forward

Senior career*
Years	Team	Apps	(Gls)
	Thornaby St Patrick's	?	(?)
	Stockton	?	(?)
1933–1934	Middlesbrough	0	(0)
1934–1935	Blackburn Rovers	0	(0)
1935–1938	Oldham Athletic	80	(15)
1938–1939	Hartlepool United	24	(5)
1939	Accrington Stanley	3	(2)
1945–1946	York City	0	(0)
Total		107+	(22+)
- * Club domestic league appearances and goals

Patrick Robbins (18 November 1914 – 1986) was an Irish footballer who played as an inside forward and an outside forward. He played for Oldham Athletic, Hartlepool United and Accrington Stanley in the Football League.

== Career ==
Born in Birr, Robbins started his career in the English non-League, playing for Thornaby St Patrick's and Stockton. He earned a Football League move by joining Middlesbrough in September 1933, before moving to Blackburn Rovers in February 1934. He did not make any league appearances for either side, and in May 1935 signed for Oldham Athletic. After making 85 league appearances and scoring 15 goals in the league for Oldham in three seasons, Robbins signed for Hartlepool United in June 1938. He spent the 1938–39 season with Hartlepool, making 29 appearances and scoring 5 goals before joining Accrington Stanley in July 1939. Robbins scored two goals in three league appearances before the 1939–40 season was suspended with the outbreak of the Second World War. After competitive football resumed, Robbins signed for York City in January 1945, and played in their eight FA Cup matches in the 1945–46 season.
