= John McNeill (footballer) =

Maltese footballer

Personal information
- Full name: Hamilton John McNeill
- Date of birth: 13 May 1910
- Place of birth: Żabbar, Malta
- Date of death: 2002 (aged 91–92)
- Position: Striker

Senior career*
Years	Team	Apps	(Gls)
	Parkhead Juniors	?	(?)
	Dunipace Juniors	?	(?)
	Army	?	(?)
1935	Leicester City	0	(0)
	Ayr United	?	(?)
1937–1938	Hull City	52	(27)
1938–1938	Bury	18	(7)
Total		70	(34)
- * Club domestic league appearances and goals

Hamilton John McNeill (13 May 1910 – 2002), more commonly known as John McNeill, was a Maltese footballer who played for Hull City and Bury in the Football League.
