= Alex McMurdo =

Scottish professional footballer

Personal information
- Full name: Alexander Brown McMurdo
- Date of birth: 9 April 1914
- Place of birth: Cleland, Scotland
- Position: Outside forward

Senior career*
Years	Team	Apps	(Gls)
–1935	West Calder		
1935	Bury	1	(0)
1936–1937	Queen of the South	26	(2)
1937	Rochdale	2	(0)
1939	Cleland		
- Airdrieonians
–1945	Motherwell		
1945	Clapton Orient	0	(0)
- * Club domestic league appearances and goals

Alexander Brown McMurdo was a Scottish professional footballer who played in the Scottish League for Queen of the South as an outside forward. He also played in the Football League for Rochdale and Bury.

== Career statistics ==
Appearances and goals by club, season and competition
Club	Season	League			National Cup		Total	
Club	Season	Division	Apps	Goals	Apps	Goals	Apps	Goals
Queen of the South	1936–37	Scottish First Division	26	2	1	0	27	2
Rochdale	1937–38	Third Division North	2	0	0	0	2	0
Career total			28	2	1	0	29	2
