= 2012 English Greyhound Derby =

Greyhound racing event

- Location: Wimbledon Stadium
- Start date: 27 April
- End date: 26 May
- Total prize money: £125,000 (winner)

The 2012 William Hill Greyhound Derby took place during April and May with the final being held on 26 May 2012 at Wimbledon Stadium.

Blonde Snapper trained by Mark Wallis won the final missing the trouble encountered by most of the field, he won after holding off a challenge from Farloe Ironman to take the £125,000 first prize. Defending champion Taylors Sky was well placed when being baulked.

Irish entry Razldazl Jayfkay trained by Dolores Ruth had broken the track record in the second round with a 28.08sec performance but suffered in a messy semi final race and was eliminated along with her other two leading runners Razldazl Rioga and Razldazl Bugatti.

== Final result ==
At Wimbledon (over 480 metres):

Position	Name of Greyhound	Breeding	Trap	Sectional	SP	Time	Trainer
1st	Blonde Snapper	Droopys Kewell - Rough Charley	6	4.77	8-1	28.65	Mark Wallis (Yarmouth)
2nd	Farloe Ironman	Premier Fantasy - Farloe Reserve	1	4.95	6-4f	28.79	Matt Dartnall (Swindon)
3rd	Coolavanny Bert	Where's Pedro - Mercury Queen	2	4.84	7-2	29.08	John Gardner (Private)
4th	Taylors Sky	Westmead Hawk - Rising Angel	4	4.76	7-2	29.09	Charlie Lister OBE (Private)
5th	Westmead Adonis	Droopys Vieri - Westmead Aoifa	3	4.87	10-1	29.14	Nick Savva (Private)
6th	Judicial Ruling	Duke Special - Best Fast Lady	5	4.76	3-1	29.21	Michael O'Donovan (Ireland)

=== Distances ===
1¾, 3½, short head, ½, 1 (lengths)
The distances between the greyhounds are in finishing order and shown in lengths. One length is equal to 0.08 of one second.

== Quarter finals ==
Heat 1 (May 15)
Pos	Name	SP	Time
1st	Razldazl Rioga	5-2	28.48
2nd	Taylors Sky	9-4	28.65
3rd	Razldazl Bugatti	2-1f	28.82
4th	Droopys Lorenzo	7-1	29.09
5th	Trewmount Snap	33-1	29.63
6th	Longwood Hawk	14-1	00.00

Heat 2 (May 15)
Pos	Name	SP	Time
1st	Coolavanny Bert	2-1f	28.48
2nd	Farloe Ironman	7-1	28.65
3rd	Judicial Rising	3-1	28.66
4th	Shelbourne Geoff	5-1	28.90
5th	Tinas Nova	12-1	28.94
6th	Young Sid	7-2	28.99

Heat 3 (May 15)
Pos	Name	SP	Time
1st	Razldazl Jayfkay	11-10f	28.41
2nd	Droopys Loner	7-1	28.84
3rd	Bubbly Phoenix	11-4	28.91
4th	Mill Maximus	7-1	29.20
5th	Longwood Days	40-1	29.42
6th	Boher Paddy	7-1	29.62

Heat 4 (May 15)
Pos	Name	SP	Time
1st	Droopys Jet	5-2	28.52
2nd	Blonde Snapper	7-4f	28.65
3rd	Westmead Adonis	8-1	28.67
4th	Mark My Words	16-1	28.94
5th	Graigues Orchard	4-1	29.31
6th	Bucks Blade	6-1	29.36

== Semi finals ==
First Semi Final (May 19)
Pos	Name of Greyhound	SP	Time	Trainer
1st	Farloe Ironman	16-1	28.16	Dartnall
2nd	Coolavanny Bert	9-2	28.44	Gardner
3rd	Judicial Ruling	12-1	28.54	O'Donovan
4th	Razldazl Jayfkay	11-8f	28.68	Ruth
5th	Bubbly Phoenix	9-2	28.78	Young
6th	Razldazl Rioga	7-2	28.92	Ruth

Second Semi Final (May 19)
Pos	Name of Greyhound	SP	Time	Trainer
1st	Blonde Snapper	6-1	28.41	Wallis
2nd	Taylors Sky	7-4f	28.42	Lister
3rd	Westmead Adonis	12-1	28.49	Savva
4th	Droopys Loner	14-1	28.53	Childs
5th	Droopys Jet	7-2	28.73	Black
6th	Razldazl Bugatti	11-4	29.00	O'Connell

== See also ==
- 2012 UK & Ireland Greyhound Racing Year
