= Northern Irish Derby =

Former Greyhound racing competition in Ireland

- Location: Drumbo Park
- Inaugurated: 2011
- Final run: 2014
- Sponsor: Toals Bookmakers

Race information
- Distance: 550 yards
- Surface: Sand

The Northern Irish Derby was a short-lived 36-dog greyhound racing competition held in Northern Ireland. The event was held at Drumbo Park over 550 yards and carried a £25,000 prize, which was the richest ever held in Northern Ireland. The event was short-lived, however, and finished after the 2014 running.

== Winners ==
Year	Winner	Breeding	Trainer	Time	SP	Notes
2011	Loughview Gem	Big Daddy Cool - Bardic Gem	Francis O'Brien	29.56 sec	5-1	
2012	Captain Scolari	Droopys Scolari - Bandicoot Spice	Ger Holian	29.67 sec	4-1	
2013	Jaxx On Fantasy	Premier Fantasy - Natalie Jacs On	John McGee Sr.	29.45 sec	4-5f	Track Record
2014	Atitboy	Kinloch Brae - Hather For Pat	Ronnie Mckeown	29.83 sec	7-4jf	

Discontinued

== Venues ==
- 2011-2014 Drumbo Park

== Sponsors ==
- 2011-2012 Bettor.com
- 2011-2014 Toals Bookmakers
