= Harry Hampson =

English footballer (1918–1942)

Personal information
- Full name: Harold Hampson
- Date of birth: 8 June 1918
- Place of birth: Little Hulton, England
- Date of death: 24 June 1942 (aged 24)
- Place of death: United Kingdom
- Position: Inside forward

Senior career*
Years	Team	Apps	(Gls)
1934	Walkden Primitive Methodists		
1935–1936	Everton	0	(0)
1936	Walkden Primitive Methodists		
1936–1938	Southport	42	(19)
1938–1940	Sheffield United	45	(14)
Total		87	(33)
- * Club domestic league appearances and goals

Harold Hampson (8 June 1918 – 24 June 1942) was an English professional footballer who played as an inside forward in the Football League for Southport and Sheffield United.

== Personal life ==
Hampson's brother Jimmy was also a footballer. Hampson became the first Sheffield United footballer to enlist in 1939 at the outbreak of the Second World War and was evacuated from Dunkirk in 1940. Serving as a corporal in the 110th Regiment Royal Armoured Corps (5th Battalion, Border Regiment), he died of septicaemia in a "north-western military hospital" on 24 June 1942 and was buried in Peel (St Paul) Churchyard.

== Career statistics ==
Appearances and goals by club, season and competition
Club	Season	League			FA Cup		Total	
Club	Season	Division	Apps	Goals	Apps	Goals	Apps	Goals
Southport	1936–37	Third Division North	7	1	2	0	9	1
Southport	1937–38	Third Division North	32	18	1	0	33	18
Southport	Total		39	19	3	0	42	19
Sheffield United	1939–40	Second Division	39	13	4	0	43	13
Sheffield United	1939–40	First Division	3	0	0	0	3	0
Sheffield United	Total		42	13	4	0	46	13
Career total			80	32	7	0	87	32
