= New Grosvenor Stadium =

Multi-purpose stadium in Northern Ireland

New Grosvenor Stadium and Drumbo Park
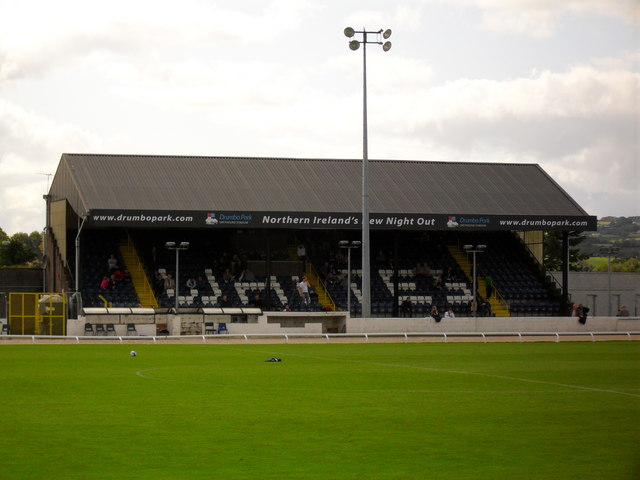
- Main football stand
- Interactive map of New Grosvenor Stadium and Drumbo Park
- Location: 57 Ballyskeagh Road, Lambeg, Lisburn, County Antrim, BT27 5TE, Northern Ireland
- Coordinates: 54°32′09″N 6°00′13″W
- Date opened: 1980
- Capacity: 1,500 (790 seated)
- Race type: Football; Greyhound Racing

New Grosvenor Stadium and Drumbo Park is a multi-purpose stadium in Ballyskeagh, County Down, Northern Ireland. It is currently used for football matches and formerly hosted greyhound racing, operating under the name Drumbo Park. The stadium currently has a total capacity of 1,500 which 790 can be seated, however this is split to a capacity for football matches of 1,500 (540 seated) and a capacity of 1,000 (250 seated) for greyhound racing.

== History ==
The stadium was built originally as a trotting venue in the village of Ballyskeagh on the outskirts of Lisburn and was acquired by Distillery Football Club and converted into a football ground in 1980.

The club named the venue New Grosvenor Park after their previous home in Belfast, which had been damaged by a fire bomb attack in 1971 and was then demolished to make way for the building of a motorway link through the city in 1972.

The stadium was modified in the mid-1980s to accommodate greyhound racing under the operating name of Ballyskeagh Greyhound Track, rebranded as Drumbo Park in 2009, and continues to be a dual venue accommodating both soccer and greyhound racing as independent bodies.

The stadium contains four distinct structures, two on the east side of the ground and two on the west, three of which are operated by Lisburn Distillery, the club having added Lisburn to their name in 1999, and a fourth operated solely by Drumbo Park. The two companies do not allow the shared use of their spectator facilities, meaning that the Drumbo Park stand is closed during football matches, which are advertised as taking place at New Grosvenor Park while the Bertie McMinn, LDFC Social Club and visiting covered terrace are all closed during greyhound racing meets, which are advertised as taking place at Drumbo Park. It previously held one Irish Cup semi-final every year.

== Location and access ==
The stadium is on the Ballyskeagh Road, a B route between Lisburn and Belfast at the small village of Ballyskeagh itself, situated three miles from Lisburn and one and a half miles from the village of Lambeg, where the nearest train station is located. The road is served by Ulsterbus rural services to and from Belfast-Lisburn.

The entrance to the stadium itself is marked with signs welcoming spectators to both New Grosvenor Stadium and Drumbo Park with a single lane track taking spectators to the car parking facilities.

== Football ==
=== Bertie McMinn Stand ===
The Bertie McMinn Stand is the main spectator section of the football stadium, situated on the East side or Lambeg side of the ground and was built shortly after Lisburn Distillery acquired the venue in 1980. It covers roughly half the Lambeg side of the ground from the halfway line to the goal and is laid out in dark blue flip up plastic seating with white seats spelling out the word "Whites", being the club nickname. The stand seats 527 spectators, including 25 seats in the directors box. The stand also houses a journalist's commentary box to its rear.

=== Lisburn Distillery Social Club and offices ===
The Distillery Social Club and offices sit on the same side of the stadium as the Morton McKnight stand occupying the area situated on the other side of the halfway line. The facilities are situated in one building, separated from the Morton McKnight Stand by a large tarmac paddock and does not offer any terracing or seated stand, although many spectators chose to stand and watch games from the paddock situated between the facilities and the pitch. The club and offices is a two-story building containing a social club on the upper level with bar, television and a small dance floor for social events. The windows on one side of the social club are whitewashed to prevent patrons from being able to view the football from inside. The club is most commonly accessed from a fire escape, which leads spectators down to the paddock between the social club and Morton McKnight Stand. The upper floor also contains a small toilet block and executive lounge. The executive lounge is the only official spectator facility in the building and consists of a small function room with its own private bar and viewing box. The box offers seating for thirteen spectators while the lounge accommodates around thirty. The executive lounge is open to any spectator wishing to purchase a season ticket to view matches there and also hosts the match sponsors.

The lower deck contains the club offices, boardroom, dressing rooms and player's tunnel as well as a smaller function room, which is usually only opened for matches against opponents that can generate an attendance that breaks the 1,000 mark. Irish League clubs do not officially record attendances but Lisburn Distillery receipts suggest their average attendances sit at around 300 to 400. The small function room is accessed through the club shop, which also houses a small club museum containing medals, International caps, banners, old shirts, programmes and memorabilia from the club's history.

Beside the social club is a large undeveloped paddock where the only food on offer on match days is provided by a fixed burger van.

=== Visiting covered terrace ===
The covered terrace was situated on the west or Belfast side of the ground but has since been removed.

=== Behind the goals ===
Neither end of the ground has been developed and each end has been 'claimed' by the two operating companies for their use. The Ballyskeagh end of the ground is little more than a loose gravel track that takes spectators from the Lambeg side of the ground to the covered terrace on match days. The entrances to the covered terrace were situated on the Belfast side of the ground but are no longer accessible without arrangement from Drumbo Park as the greyhound racing operators erected security gates outside the ground, blocking access to these entrances in 2009. Viewing of football from here is allowed but few fans view from here as the location of the Greyhound track places the path some distance away from the goal.

The opposite end or River Lagan end for location purposes is used by the Drumbo Park greyhound facilities as the kennels and greyhound preparation area on race nights. This area is accessible from the Neil Partridge stand during Football matches but is not accessible by spectators of the Drumbo Park Greyhound Stand at its other end. As at the other end of the ground, there is no interest for spectators to view the game from behind this goal and, as this end does not provide access to the stands on the other side of the ground, remains unused during football matches.

== Greyhound racing ==
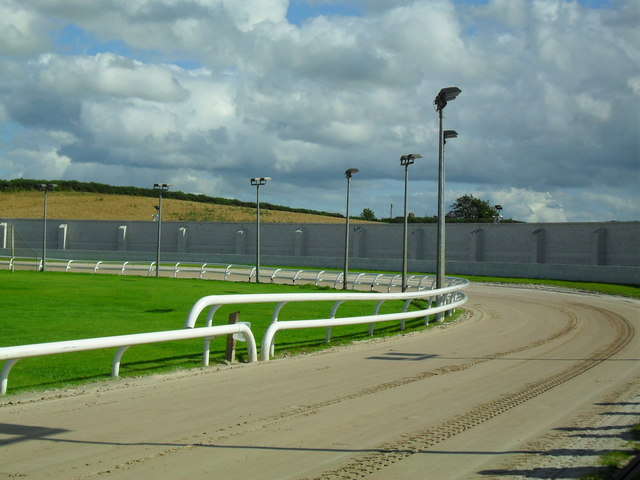
Greyhound track around football pitch

=== History ===
Northern Irish greyhound tracks are unusual in the sport of greyhound racing due to the fact that they do not fall within the jurisdiction of the Greyhound Board of Great Britain. Instead the Irish Greyhound Board oversee proceedings.

A greyhound track called Ballyskeagh was constructed in May 1994 and became Belfast's only circuit following the 1996 closure of Dunmore Stadium. Distances covered were 375, 525, 550, 575, 600 & 880 yards. The Irish Greyhound Board did not fund the track and this was a major factor in the closure of the stadium to greyhound racing on 24 October 2005 after struggling for many years.

In 2010 the track re-opened with the new name of Drumbo Park, with state of the art facilities. A 350-seat grandstand restaurant took centre stage under a new era and racing takes place every Friday and Saturday. The first Northern Irish Derby was held at the track from 2011 until 2014, the event was sponsored by Bettor.com and carried a £25,000 prize, the richest ever held in Northern Ireland. The event lost some status two years later after the prize money was cut.

Although there are four structures around the track and pitch they were used independently by the football club and greyhound company which resulted in the football ground closing at 6.30pm and the greyhound racing opening straight after. On 11 January 2019 the greyhound racing was suspended, the reason given by the ex-Lisburn Distillery directors, John McCollum, Michael McAdam and Tommy Anderson was the difficulty in making a trading profit.

The track re-opened on 13 July 2019 under the management of 'Run With Passion Ltd' and new working practices were employed, including pre-race veterinary inspection of all runners.

Drumbo Park's permanent closure was announced on 31 August 2026, due to low attendance and difficulty attracting runners. The final meeting had been held on Saturday 30 August.

=== Drumbo Park Stand ===
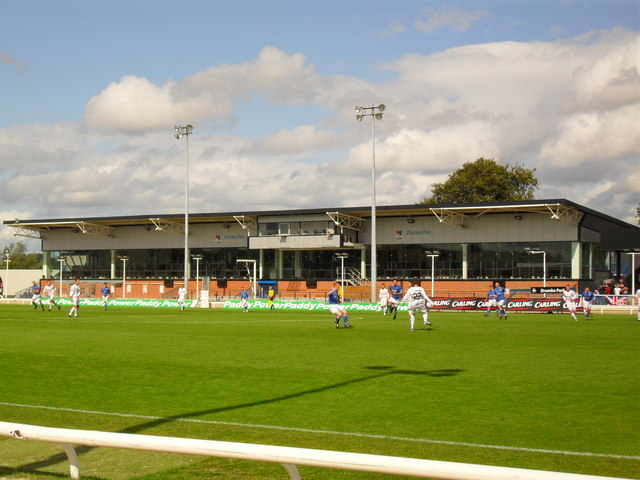
Drumbo Park Stand

The Drumbo Park Stand was operated independently by Drumbo Park Greyhound Racing and is not open to spectators during football matches, in turn this was the only area of the ground open during greyhound racing and was accessed from the opposite side of the stadium from the main football facilities. This is the newest stand in the stadium, having been built in 2008 and is purpose built for greyhound racing with an indoor, glass-fronted spectator restaurant making up the majority of the stand with a small spectator paddock outside to the front. The restaurant was a la carte and offered seating for 250 racegoers with Tote operators on hand for betting. Spectators needed to book in advance to ensure a seat or could stand in the front paddock, which accommodated 750 spectators and had bookmakers booths trackside.

=== Competitions ===
- Northern Irish Derby

=== Track records ===
Current

Yards	Greyhound	Time	Date
335	Dunham Noel	17.52	29 August 2020
525	Leeview Jet	27.88	23 October 2010
550	Jaxx on Fantasy	29.45	5 October 2013
575	Lemon Velvet	30.90	25 June 2011
835	Castlegore Star	46.43	25 June 2011

Former

Yards	Greyhound	Time	Date
335	Head Man Boo	17.74	27 September 2008
335	Lily Mayday	17.62	2 October 2010
335	Drumcrow Rocco	17.61	20 July 2019
375	Prime Location	19.89	11 June 1999
525	Jewel Black	28.48	27 October 1997
525	Ramels Black	=28.48	2003
525	Gilbeyhall Jake	28.38	21 March 2009
525	Moral Duty	28.08	2 October 2010
550	Duffys Kestrel	29.85	12 December 1997
550	Drumcrow Marco	30.10	27 June 2009
550	Pocket Gal	30.05	23 July 2009
550	Eden Brett	29.79	12 November 2009
550	Rafas Wee Pet	29.77	11 June 2011
550	Leeview Jet	29.51	18 June 2011
575	Duffys Kestrel	31.53	23 October 1998
575	Lady Spiral	31.50	26 April 2003
575	Prince Adam	31.46	15 November 2003
575	Dooey Shaw	31.32	28 February 2009
575	Monleek Bay	31.27	15 October 2010
600	Chesters Choice	32.46	27 June 1997
836	Fast Bond	47.03	23 December 2009
836	Ferdia Bound	46.84	30 April 2010
836	Ferdia Bound	46.53	25 September 2010
880	Lisduff Flash	49.85	14 January 2000
880	Hi Bubblesnsuds	49.72	16 August 2003
