= Bobby McFarlane =

Scottish footballer (1913-1971)

Personal information
- Full name: Robert Robertson McFarlane
- Date of birth: 12 October 1913
- Place of birth: Bo'ness, Scotland
- Date of death: 1971 (aged 57–58)
- Place of death: Doncaster, England
- Position: Wing half

Senior career*
Years	Team	Apps	(Gls)
1935−1936	Margate		
1936−1937	Arsenal	0	(0)
1937−1948	Doncaster Rovers	131	(6)
1948−1950	Boston United		
- * Club domestic league appearances and goals

Robert Robertson McFarlane (12 October 1913−1971) was a Scottish footballer who played as a wing half in the Football League for Doncaster Rovers.

Born in Bo'ness, Scotland, McFarlane played for Southern Football League club Margate in the 1935−36 season, including a 3rd Round FA Cup tie at Blackpool which was lost 3−1. He was signed by Arsenal the next season but failed to make any appearances.

For the 1937−38 season he moved to Division 3 North side Doncaster where he played in 145 League and cup games, scoring 6 times, before and after the war. Doncaster won the league title in 1946−47 leading to a season in Division 2 for McFarlane, though he only appeared in 13 games in what was an unsuccessful relegation season for the club.

From 1948 to 1950, he played for Boston United in the Midland League.

He died in Doncaster in 1971.

== Honours ==
Doncaster Rovers

- Division 3 North

Champions 1946−47

Runners Up 1937−38, 1938−39
