= Wilfred Barks =

English footballer (1908–1968)

Personal information
- Full name: Wilfred Barks
- Date of birth: 6 October 1907
- Place of birth: Chesterfield, England
- Date of death: 1968 (aged 59–60)
- Position: Inside forward

Senior career*
Years	Team	Apps	(Gls)
1931–1932	Dinnington Athletic		
1932–1934	Chesterfield	7	(0)
1934–1935	Mansfield Town	4	(0)
1935	Mexborough Athletic		
1935	Denaby United		
1936	Dinnington Main Colliery Welfare		
1937	Rochdale	3	(0)
- * Club domestic league appearances and goals

Wilfred Barks (6 October 1908 – 1968) was an English professional footballer who played in the Football League for Chesterfield, Mansfield Town and Rochdale.
