= Thomas McMurray (sportsman) =

Irish cricketer (1911–1964)

Personal information
- Full name: Thomas McIlvean McMurray
- Born: 24 July 1911; Belfast, Ireland
- Died: 24 March 1964 (aged 52); Belfast, Northern Ireland
- Height: 5 ft 2 in (1.57 m)
- Batting: Right-handed
- Relatives: Alfred McMurray (brother)

Domestic team information
- Years: Team
- 1933 to 1939: Surrey

Career statistics
Competition	First-class
Matches	33
Runs scored	892
Batting average	18.58
100s/50s	0/4
Top score	62
Balls bowled	18
Wickets	1
Bowling average	23.00
5 wickets in innings	0
10 wickets in match	0
Best bowling	1/3
Catches/stumpings	14/0
- Source: Cricinfo, 3 May 2020

Thomas McIlvean McMurray (24 July 1911 – 24 March 1964) was an Irish cricketer and footballer. He played 33 first-class matches for Surrey between 1933 and 1939. His brother, Alfred McMurray, played for Ireland in the 1930s.

Tom McMurray was born in Belfast and educated there at the Royal Belfast Academical Institution. He was playing football in London for Millwall when he joined Surrey in 1932.

A batsman, McMurray was never able to establish a spot in the Surrey First XI, and played 63 matches for the Second XI between 1932 and 1948, scoring nine centuries with a top score of 133 not out against Devon in 1937. His top first-class score was 62, which he made twice: in 1933 he opened against Northamptonshire and made 62 and 33; and in 1936, batting at number three against Hampshire, he made 62 in the second innings. He was an outstanding fieldsman, noted for his speed in the outfield, and once fielded as a substitute for England in a Test match in 1934.

From 1945 he taught PT at Campbell College in Belfast. He also umpired several Minor Counties cricket matches in England each year during the summer holidays from 1949 to 1963.

== See also ==
- List of Surrey County Cricket Club players
