= Micky Burke =

Scottish footballer (1904–1984)

Personal information
- Full name: Michael Burke
- Date of birth: 28 June 1904
- Place of birth: Blythswood, Renfrewshire, Scotland
- Date of death: 16 October 1984 (aged 80)
- Place of death: Broomhill, Glasgow, Scotland
- Height: 5 ft 7 in (1.70 m)
- Position: Forward

Senior career*
Years	Team	Apps	(Gls)
- Dumbarton Harp
- Old Kilpatrick
1927–1929	Ashfield		
1929–1930	Clyde	14	(1)
1930–1931	Aberdeen	0	(0)
1931–1932	Dunfermline Athletic	23	(10)
1932–1934	Dundalk	29	(13)
1934–1936	Lincoln City	27	(2)
1936–1937	Southport	20	(2)
1937–1938	Rochdale	8	(0)
1938–1939	Morton		
1939–19??	Burton Town		
- * Club domestic league appearances and goals

Michael Burke (28 June 1904 – 16 October 1984) was a Scottish professional footballer who played league football in Scotland, Ireland and England. He played in the Scottish League for Clyde, Dunfermline Athletic and Morton, was a member of the Dundalk team that won the 1932–33 League of Ireland title, and made 55 appearances in the English Football League for Lincoln City, Southport and Rochdale. He played as an inside forward or outside forward.

== Life and career ==
Michael Burke was born on 28 June 1904 in Blythswood, in what was then Renfrewshire. He was the eldest of nine children of an Irish father and a Scottish mother, and began his working life as a riveter in the shipyards in Glasgow.

He played Junior football for Dumbarton Harp and Old Kilpatrick before joining Ashfield in June 1927. In December, he took part in a trial for the Intermediate League representative eleven, and, writing in the Sunday Post a month later, "The Traveller" mentioned Burke as one who might have a future in the senior ranks. He helped Ashfield reach the final of the Intermediate Cup, "all but had the first goal with a shot that got the crossbar", and made the pass for Peter Cunningham to score what proved the only goal of the match.

Both Burke and Cunningham joined Clyde early in the 1929–30 Division One season. Burke scored once from 14 league matches, before moving on to Aberdeen. Having made no first-team appearances, he was given a free transfer at the end of the 1930–31 season, and signed for Division Two club Dunfermline Athletic after a trial. Despite the second half of his 1931–32 season being disrupted by injury and illness, he was one of six players offered terms for a second season, but did not accept.

Instead, he signed for Irish club Dundalk, and made his debut in October 1932 in the Leinster Cup, playing at outside left. He continued in the side for the rest of the season as Dundalk became the first team from outside Dublin to win the League of Ireland title. He stayed with Dundalk for a second season, at the end of which he had 31 goals from 74 matches played, 13 from 29 in the league.

Dundalk's trainer-coach, Steve Wright, was appointed trainer of Lincoln City, newly relegated to the English Third Division North, in June 1934, and on his recommendation, Burke joined the club on trial a few weeks later. By the end of October, Lincoln had decided to keep him. He made his debut in the FA Cup against Shildon in November and his first appearance in the English Football League on 2 February 1935, after which he played in 10 of the remaining 16 matches as Lincoln finished in fourth place. He was a regular at inside right in the first couple of months of the next season, but fell out of favour and, though impressing for Lincoln's Midland League team, played only once more for the first team after the turn of the year and was one of eleven players released at the end of the campaign.

Burke moved on to another Third Division North club, Southport. He scored on debut in the opening match of the 1936–37 season in a 1–1 draw with Hartlepools United, and continued in the team until a groin muscle pulled during his ninth appearance kept him out for two months. He played a further 11 matches, but never regained a regular place in the side, and scored the second of his two goals for Southport in his last match, a defeat at Darlington on 3 April 1937. He finished his Football League career with a season at Rochdale, where he was mainly a reserve, making only nine appearances for the first team.

He returned to Scotland, signed for Division Two club Morton in August 1938, and played regularly for much of the season. The following August, he went back to England for a month's trial with Midland League club Burton Town, but the outbreak of war put an end to his career.

Burke returned to the shipyards as an electrician, and later worked in the docks. He continued to live in Glasgow, where he died of pneumonia in the Broomhill area on 16 October 1984 at the age of 80.

== Honours ==
Ashfield

- Scottish Intermediate Cup: 1927–28

Dundalk

- League of Ireland: 1932–33
- League of Ireland Shield runners up: 1932–33
- LFA President's Cup runners up: 1933–34
