= Matt Gray (footballer, born 1907) =

English footballer (1907–1985)

Personal information
- Full name: Matthew Gray
- Date of birth: 18 April 1907
- Place of birth: Westhoughton, England
- Date of death: 1985 (aged 77–78)
- Height: 5 ft 10 in (1.78 m)
- Position: Inside forward

Senior career*
| Years | Team | Apps | (Gls) |
| 1926–1927 | Hindley Green | | |
| 1927–1928 | Atherton | | |
| 1928–1939 | Oldham Athletic | 289 | (58) |
| Total | | 289 | (58) |
- * Club domestic league appearances and goals

Matthew Gray (18 April 1907 – 1985) was an English footballer who played in the Football League for Oldham Athletic.
