= John Clacher =

Scottish footballer

Personal information
- Place of birth: Kirkcaldy, Scotland
- Height: 5 ft 7 in (1.70 m)
- Position: Wing half

Senior career*
Years	Team	Apps	(Gls)
1934–1937	Burnley	30	(1)
1937–1938	Darlington	36	(2)
- * Club domestic league appearances and goals

John Clacher was a Scottish professional association footballer who played as a wing half.
