= Eddie Tunney =

English footballer

Personal information
- Full name: Edward Luton Tunney
- Date of birth: 23 September 1915
- Place of birth: Liverpool, England
- Date of death: 8 September 2011 (aged 95)
- Place of death: Merseyside, England
- Height: 5 ft 7 in (1.70 m)
- Position: Full back

Senior career*
Years	Team	Apps	(Gls)
1936–1937	Everton	0	(0)
1937–1939	Wrexham		
1947–1952	Wrexham		
- Winsford United
- * Club domestic league appearances and goals as of 14:10, 14 March 2018 (UTC)

Edward Luton Tunney (23 September 1915 – 8 September 2011) was an English footballer who played as a full back.

== Pre-war career ==
Tunney started his career in football on the staff at Everton, however whilst there he played in the reserve side.

He then moved to Wrexham in 1937, staying there until he was forced to move away due to his stationing as a sergeant instructor.

== During the war ==
During the war, Tunney played as a war-time guest for Tranmere Rovers, Hartlepool United, Crystal Palace and Tottenham Hotspur

== Post-war career ==
After the war, Tunney returned to Wrexham, where he played until 1952. He made a total of 222 appearances for Wrexham over the course of his two spells there, before moving to non-league Winsford United.

== Death ==
Tunney died on 8 September 2011, just a few weeks away from his 96th birthday. He was survived by his wife, Daisy.
