= Albert Harris (footballer) =

English footballer

Personal information
- Full name: Albert Harris
- Date of birth: 16 September 1912
- Place of birth: Horden, County Durham, England
- Date of death: 1995 (aged 82)
- Place of death: Scunthorpe, Lincolnshire, England
- Height: 5 ft 8 in (1.73 m)
- Position: Outside forward

Senior career*
Years	Team	Apps	(Gls)
–	Hetton United		
–	Herrington Swifts		
1930–1931	Hull City	5	(0)
–	Blackhall Colliery Welfare		
1935–1936	Newcastle United	12	(4)
1936–1937	Barnsley	15	(1)
1937–1939	Darlington	60	(7)
–	Scunthorpe & Lindsey United		
- * Club domestic league appearances and goals

Albert Harris (16 September 1912 – 1995) was an English footballer who made 92 appearances in the Football League playing on the wing for Hull City, Newcastle United, Barnsley and Darlington in the 1930s. He also played for Wearside League clubs Hetton United, Herrington Swifts, and Blackhall Colliery Welfare, and for Scunthorpe & Lindsey United.

Harris represented Durham Schools at under-15 level, playing for the team for two seasons, 1925–26 and 1926–27, rather than the customary one.

During the 1937–38 season, Harris and fellow forward Albert Brallisford were invited to "explain their recent poor form" to Darlington's chairman and manager; while Harris's Darlington career continued, Brallisford never played for the club again.
