= Ernie Thompson (footballer, born 1909) =

English footballer (1909–1985)

Personal information
- Full name: John Ernest Thompson
- Date of birth: 21 June 1909
- Place of birth: Newbiggin-by-the-Sea, Northumberland, England
- Date of death: 28 December 1985 (aged 76)
- Height: 5 ft 11 in (1.80 m)
- Position: Forward

Youth career
- Benfieldside School

Senior career*
Years	Team	Apps	(Gls)
	Stakeford United	0	(0)
1928	Ashington (trial)	0	(0)
1928	Bradford Park Avenue (trial)	0	(0)
1928–1929	Carlisle United	2	(1)
1929–1930	Bristol City	0	(0)
1930–1931	Bath City		
1931–1936	Blackburn Rovers	171	(82)
1936–1938	Manchester United	3	(1)
1938–1939	Gateshead	24	(7)
1939–?	York City	0	(0)
- * Club domestic league appearances and goals

John Ernest Thompson (21 June 1909 – 28 December 1985) was an English footballer who played as a forward. Born in Newbiggin-by-the-Sea, Northumberland, he played for Stakeford United, Ashington, Bradford Park Avenue, Carlisle United, Bristol City, Bath City, Blackburn Rovers, Manchester United, Gateshead and York City.

== Career ==
Thompson's father was a former boxing champion. Born in Newbiggin-by-the-Sea, Thompson began his football career with nearby Stakeford United. In August 1928, he had trials with Third Division North sides Ashington and Carlisle United, and Second Division Bradford Park Avenue. After declining terms with Ashington, he signed as an amateur with Carlisle before turning professional three weeks later in September 1928. He spent most of the 1928–29 season in the club's reserve team, scoring 26 goals as the team won the North Eastern League Second Division and the Cumberland Cup. He made his Football League debut for Carlisle's first team as an inside forward away to Wigan Borough on 2 February 1929, scoring once in a 2–2 draw; his only other appearance came a week later in a 1–0 home win over Crewe Alexandra.

At the end of the season, Thompson joined Second Division Bristol City, but never made a first-team appearance, instead spending his single season with the club playing in the reserves in both the Western Section of the Southern Football League and the Western Football League First Division. He left before the end of the 1929–30 season in February 1930 to join Bath City, playing for them in the Southern Football League for just over a year before joining First Division side Blackburn Rovers in April 1931. There he played mostly as a "bustling, forceful centre-forward", scoring 82 goals in 171 league appearances at a rate of almost a goal a game. This record meant he was Blackburn's leading scorer in four of his five full seasons at the club.

In 1936, Blackburn were relegated to the Second Division, but Thompson was presented with the opportunity to return to the First Division when he signed for Manchester United for a fee of £4,500 in November 1936. He scored on his debut at home to Liverpool on 21 November, but the match ended in a 5–2 defeat. He played again in the next game away to Leeds United on 28 November, but did not manage to score and Manchester United lost 2–1. He made one more appearance for the club the following season, in a 2–1 defeat at home to Southampton on 25 September 1937.

In March 1938, he was allowed to leave for Third Division North side Gateshead, for whom he scored twice on his debut, a 4–1 win over Halifax Town. After just over a year with Gateshead, during which time he scored a total of seven goals in 24 league appearances, Thompson joined York City. He scored in his second appearance for the club – a penalty in a 2–1 defeat away to Rotherham United – but his time there was cut short by the outbreak of the Second World War, and after just three appearances for York, he was not heard from in professional football circles again.
