= George Burditt (footballer) =

English footballer

Personal information
- Full name: George Leslie Burditt
- Date of birth: 27 February 1910
- Place of birth: Ibstock, England
- Date of death: 1981 (aged 70–71)
- Height: 5 ft 11 1/2 in (1.82 m)
- Position: Forward

Senior career*
Years	Team	Apps	(Gls)
- Ibstock Penistone Rovers
1933–1934	Norwich City	0	(0)
1934–1936	Nottingham Forest	18	(10)
1936–1937	Millwall	1	(0)
1937–1939	Wrexham	67	(35)
1939	Doncaster Rovers	0	(0)
- * Club domestic league appearances and goals

George Leslie Burditt (27 February 1910 – 1981) was an English professional footballer who played as a forward. He made appearances in the English Football League for Nottingham Forest, Millwall and Wrexham

He also guested for Leeds United and Doncaster Rovers during the Second World War.
