= Frank Curran (English footballer) =

English footballer

Personal information
- Date of birth: 31 May 1917
- Place of birth: Ryton-on-Tyne, England
- Date of death: 24 September 1998 (aged 81)
- Place of death: Southport, England
- Height: 5 ft 8 in (1.73 m)
- Position: Inside forward

Senior career*
| Years | Team | Apps | (Gls) |
| 1935–1937 | Southport | 16 | (3) |
| 1937–1938 | Accrington Stanley | 34 | (14) |
| 1938–1939 | Bristol Rovers | 27 | (21) |
| 1939–1946 | Bristol City | 0 | (0) |
| 1946–1947 | Bristol Rovers | 10 | (3) |
| 1947 | Shrewsbury Town | 0 | (0) |
| 1947–1948 | Tranmere Rovers | 17 | (7) |
- Shrewsbury Town
| Total | | 104 | (48) |
- * Club domestic league appearances and goals

Frank Curran (31 May 1917 – 24 September 1998) was an English footballer, who played as an inside forward in the Football League for Southport, Accrington Stanley, Bristol Rovers and Tranmere Rovers.
