= Fred Chandler =

English footballer

Personal information
- Full name: Frederick Ernest John Chandler
- Date of birth: 2 August 1912
- Place of birth: Hythe, Hampshire, England
- Date of death: September 2005 (aged 93)
- Height: 5 ft 10 1/2 in (1.79 m)
- Position: Inside left

Senior career*
Years	Team	Apps	(Gls)
1930	Portsmouth	0	(0)
	Newport (IOW)	?	(?)
1932–1935	Reading	41	(14)
1935	Blackpool	15	(2)
1936	Swindon Town	21	(17)
1937–1946	Crewe Alexandra	83	(23)
- * Club domestic league appearances and goals

Frederick Ernest John Chandler (2 August 1912 – September 2005) was an English professional footballer. An inside left who could also play at outside left and left back, he played in the Football League for Reading, Blackpool, Swindon Town and Crewe Alexandra.

== Career ==
After starting his career with Portsmouth in 1930, he joined Isle of Wight club Newport without having made any League appearances for Pompey. He returned to the mainland in 1932, joining Reading. He made 41 League appearances for the Royals, scoring fourteen goals. In 1935 he joined Blackpool. He made fifteen appearances in the League for the Lancashire club, scoring twice, before signing for Swindon Town the following year. He made 21 League appearances for Swindon, scoring seven goals, in his one season with the club.

Chandler joined Crewe Alexandra in 1937, and remained there until after World War II. He made 83 League appearances for Alex, scoring 23 goals.
