= Westhoughton Greyhound Track =

Dog racing track in the United Kingdom

- Location: Marsh Brook Fold, Wigan Road, Westhoughton, Metropolitan Borough of Bolton
- Coordinates: 53°32′27″N 2°33′28″W
- Opened: 1950s
- Closed: 2012

Westhoughton Greyhound Track was a greyhound racing track in Hart Common, Westhoughton, Metropolitan Borough of Bolton.

== Opening ==
The track opened in 1950s and was located on Marsh Brook Fold on the south side of Wigan Road at Hart Common in Westhoughton.

== Greyhound racing ==
Independent (unaffiliated to a governing body) greyhound racing took place on a tight oval shaped circuit and raced over 285, 470 and 660 yards. Racing started during the 1950s and the circumference of the track was 375 yards with kennels facilities for 40 greyhounds.

Race nights were held on Monday, Thursday and Friday evenings with five dog racing instead of the normal six. Competitions held included the Westhoughton Derby and St Leger.

During 2000 the track was put up for sale for £100,000 by owner Arthur Brightcliffe.

== Closure ==
The track closed in 2012 and in 2013 the council agreed the building of 38 homes on the site. The site was demolished in 2014 and in 2017 the redevelopment was passed.
