= Bill Temple (footballer) =

English footballer

Personal information
- Full name: William Temple
- Date of birth: 12 December 1914
- Place of birth: Winlaton, England
- Date of death: 2006 (aged 91–92)
- Height: 5 ft 8 in (1.73 m)
- Position: Inside forward

Senior career*
Years	Team	Apps	(Gls)
1932–1933	Newbiggin Juniors		
1933–1934	Newbiggin West End		
1934–1937	Aldershot	14	(2)
1937–1938	Carlisle United	11	(4)
1938–1939	Grimsby Town	2	(0)
1946–1947	Gateshead	10	(1)
- * Club domestic league appearances and goals

William Temple (12 December 1914 – 2006) was an English professional footballer who played in the Football League for Aldershot, Carlisle United, Grimsby Town and Gateshead. He played in both inside forward positions.
