= Herbert Hamilton (footballer) =

English footballer (1906–1951)

Personal information
- Full name: Herbert Harold Hamilton
- Date of birth: 27 March 1906
- Place of birth: Wallasey, England
- Date of death: 10 June 1951
- Height: 5 ft 9 1/2 in (1.77 m)
- Position: Full-back

Senior career*
Years	Team	Apps	(Gls)
1921–1922	New Brighton Baptists		
1922–1923	Harrowby		
1923	Poulton Rovers		
1923–1924	New Brighton	1	(0)
1926–1927	Everton	1	(0)
1927–1931	Preston North End	24	(0)
1931–1937	Chesterfield	192	(5)
1937–1938	Tranmere Rovers	47	(1)
1938–1939	Accrington Stanley	10	(0)
1939	Bangor City		
1939	Marine		
Total		275	(6)
- * Club domestic league appearances and goals

Herbert Harold Hamilton (27 March 1906 – 10 June 1951) was an English footballer who played in the Football League for Accrington Stanley, Chesterfield, Everton, New Brighton, Preston North End and Tranmere Rovers.

He moved to Canada in July 1948 and played in Brantford, Ontario until he died three years later.
