= Teddy Craig =

Scottish footballer

Personal information
- Full name: Edward Craig
- Place of birth: Scotland
- Position: Full back

Senior career*
Years	Team	Apps	(Gls)
1924–1930	Fulham	151	(29)
- * Club domestic league appearances and goals

Edward "Teddy" Craig (? – ?) was a Scottish footballer who played as a half back for Fulham. He made 161 appearances in all competitions for Fulham between 1922 and 1925, scoring 31 goals, including an equalising goal against Everton in an FA Cup tie in 1926.
