= Tony Cliss =

English footballer

Personal information
- Full name: Tony Cliss
- Date of birth: 22 September 1959 (age 67)
- Place of birth: March, England
- Height: 5 ft 8 in (1.73 m)
- Position: Midfielder

Senior career*
| Years | Team | Apps | (Gls) |
| 1977–1983 | Peterborough United | 85 | (11) |
| 1983–1987 | Crewe Alexandra | 113 | (11) |
- Chatteris Town
- * Club domestic league appearances and goals

Tony Cliss (born 22 September 1959) is an English former footballer who played as a midfielder in the Football League for Peterborough United and Crewe Alexandra.

== Career ==
Born in March, Cliss started his career with Peterborough United in 1977. He played his first game on 28 October 1977 in a 3–0 defeat to Colchester United. He is best remembered for a ghost goal scored against Stockport County where although a goal was awarded it had passed over the goal-line through the side netting. He moved to Crewe in 1983 before leaving professional football in 1987 to play local football on The Fens.

== Post-football career ==
After finishing playing football, Cliss became a postman.
