= Jack Waring (footballer) =

English footballer

Personal information
- Full name: John Waring
- Date of birth: 13 July 1909
- Place of birth: Wombwell, England
- Date of death: 1991 (aged 81–82)
- Height: 5 ft 5 in (1.65 m)
- Position: Winger

Senior career*
| Years | Team | Apps | (Gls) |
| 1931–1932 | Wombwell | | |
| 1932–1934 | Grimsby Town | 2 | (0) |
| 1934 | Crewe Alexandra | 3 | (1) |
| 1934–1935 | Sheffield Wednesday | 0 | (0) |
| 1935–1939 | Crewe Alexandra | 168 | (56) |
- * Club domestic league appearances and goals

John Waring (13 July 1909 – 1991) was an English professional footballer who played as a winger.
