= Edward Hubert Cunningham Craig =

Edward Hubert Cunningham Craig (sometimes Cunningham-Craig) FRSE FGS (1874–1946) was a Scottish geologist and cartographer. He is remembered for extensive mapping as part of HM Geological Survey 1896 to 1907. He was an expert at finding new oil-fields in the early 20th century and worked across the planet in this role.

== Life ==
He was born in Edinburgh the son of Edward Cunningham Craig and his wife, Mary Elizabeth Pattison, on 22 April 1874. His father died shortly before he was born. He attended Glenalmond College in Perthshire and from 1892 studied geology at Cambridge University. He was elected a Fellow of the Geological Society in 1893.

He received a post mapping for HM Geological Survey in 1896. He was promoted to head Geologist on 1 April 1901. From 1903 until 1905 he made official maps of the island of Trinidad and Tobago as government geologist. From 1907 until death he worked for the Burmah Oil Company. His task here was largely on the location of oil fields. He found six especially important oil fields in Persia at Masjed-e-Suleiman in 1908. From 1910 to 1912 he sought oil fields in Baluchistan. In 1912 he found fields in Venezuela and in 1913 fields in South Africa. He also spent time in Canada (Manitoba, Alberta and New Brunswick) searching for both oil and coal-fields.

He was elected a Fellow of the Royal Society of Edinburgh in 1916. His proposers were John Horne, Ben Peach, Sir John Smith Flett and James Currie.

During the First World War he worked with the director of supply for the factory production of poison gas, then, from 1917, was appointed Senior Geologist in petroleum research to the Ministry of Munitions.

After the war he found oil variously and sequentially in Egypt, Ecuador, the East Indies, Hungary, Romania, Estonia, Yugoslavia, Java, the United States and Turkey.

In late life he lived at The Dutch House in Beaconsfield, Buckinghamshire. He died on 24 April 1946 at Kinellan Nursing Home in Beaconsfield.

== Family ==
He was married to Anna Irene Cleaver in 1910. They had no children.

== Publications ==
- Memoir: Blair Atholl (1905)
- Memoir: Colonsay (1911)
- Memoir: Braemar (1912)
- Oil Findings (1912) reprinted 1920 including a Russian translation
- Memoir: Upper Strathspey (1913)
- Memoir: Beauly and Inverness (1914)

== Artistic recognition ==
His portrait by Spy appeared in Vanity Fair in 1920.
