= Simeon Ackroyd Shaw =

19th-century English scientific writer, industrial historian and teacher

- Born: 1785 Lancashire, England
- Died: 1859 (aged 73–74) Stoke-on-Trent, England
- Occupation: Scientific writer, industrial historian, teacher
- Notable works: History of the Staffordshire Potteries (1829), The Chemistry of Pottery (1837)

Simeon Ackroyd Shaw (1785–1859) was a 19th-century English scientific writer, industrial historian and teacher. He spent his working life in the Staffordshire Potteries, now the city of Stoke-on-Trent, England.

== Life ==
Shaw originated in Lancashire and as a young man he arrived in the Potteries to work on the Potteries Gazette and Newcastle-under-Lyme Advertiser newspaper. After some 20 years of newspaper and printing work, living in Wolstanton, he then went into teaching. He ran several teaching academies in the district.

== Work ==
His first book was the 6-volume Nature displayed in the heavens, and on the earth, according to the latest observations and discoveries (1823). This was his comprehensive series of his popular short lectures on everything from natural species to meteorites, accompanied by lavish illustrated plates.

Shaw wrote a valuable early historical book, the History of the Staffordshire potteries; and the rise and progress of the manufacture of pottery and porcelain; with references to genuine specimens, and notices of eminent potters (1829). After opening chapters detailing the advantages of the topography for the industry, the book takes a biographical approach. Shaw methodically notes the various key manufacturers and their contributions to the industry and district.

In 1835 Shaw published a valuable article on local potting techniques to the Encyclopaedia Metropolitana (Vol. VIII), which was only discovered in the late 1990s.

His next book The Chemistry of Pottery (1837) attempted to draw out and codify some of the deep knowledge implicit in the pottery-making district of north Staffordshire. The work also covered the chemistry of glass, there being a glass-making district accessible nearby in south Staffordshire.

In 1837 Shaw began his book The Borough of Stoke-upon-Trent in 1838 and had a wealth of primary sources at his disposal. The book was written and published in instalments. There were financial difficulties after the first eight volumes, and the work was then taken over and completed by John Ward. Ward's finished 600-page version was The borough of Stoke-upon-Trent, in the commencement of the reign of Queen Victoria (1843).

Shaw wrote little after the early 1840s, but he lived on for nearly two more decades. He was buried in Bethesda churchyard in Hanley, Stoke-on-Trent.

== Public domain works ==
All of Shaw's works are now in the public domain, and his book can be found for free on services such as Hathi and the Internet Archive.
