= Listed buildings in Newcastle-under-Lyme =

Newcastle-under-Lyme is a town and an unparished area in the district of Newcastle-under-Lyme, Staffordshire, England. It contains 71 buildings that are recorded in the National Heritage List for England. Of these, four are listed at Grade II*, the middle of the three grades, and the others are at Grade II, the lowest grade. The list covers the town of Newcastle-under-Lyme, including suburbs such as Bradwell, Clayton, Porthill, and Wolstanton, and nearby villages including Apedale and Chesterton. Most of the listed buildings are houses and cottages, farmhouses and farm buildings, shops, and offices. The other listed buildings include churches and chapels, memorials in churchyards, the remains of a castle, public houses, a guildhall, a market cross, a former blast furnace, the base of a mine chimney, a former military barracks converted into workshops, items in a cemetery, a school, a milepost, and a statue of Queen Victoria.

== Key ==
Grade	Criteria
II*	Particularly important buildings of more than special interest
II	Buildings of national importance and special interest

== Buildings ==
Name and location	Photograph	Date	Notes	Grade
Castle Foundations; 53.01068°N 2.23356°W		12th century	All that is visible are parts of the motte. Excavations in 1935 revealed the sandstone foundations of the gatehouse, and these are now covered by earth.	II
St Giles' Church; 53.01157°N 2.22987°W		13th century	The oldest part of the church is the tower, the rest of the church being rebuilt in 1873–76 by George Gilbert Scott. The church is built in sandstone with tile roofs, and consists of a nave with a clerestory, north and south aisles, north and south porches, a chancel, north and south chapels, and a west tower. The tower has three stages, clasping angle buttresses, a northwest stair turret, a west door, a clock face, and an embattled parapet. The east window has seven lights.	II*
49 Ironmarket; 53.01173°N 2.22654°W		Mid to late 16th century	A house, later a public house, it is timber framed, with a rendered front and a tile roof. There are two storeys, and it consists of a two-bay hall range and a projecting gabled cross-wing on the right. There are two shop fronts, an entry on the left, and the windows are casements. Inside, there is remaining timber framing. (Note: Street View in July 2017 shows that the building has been converted into a shop.)	II
36 High Street; 53.01132°N 2.22859°W		Late 16th century	The building, once a public house, was partly rebuilt in the early 19th century. It is rendered over a timber framed core, and has a tile roof. There are two storeys, and the building consists of a hall range, and a projecting gabled cross-wing to the left. The round-headed doorway is in the angle, and there is a modern shop front to the right. The windows are mullioned, and inside there is exposed timberwork. (Note: Street View in July 2017 shows that the building has been converted into a shop.)	II
Bradwell Hall; 53.04472°N 2.23720°W	—	Late 16th or early 17th century	A farmhouse, later used for other purposes, it has a timber framed core that was refronted in the 18th century. It is in painted brick on a stone plinth and has a tile roof. There are two storeys, five bays, and projecting wings with hipped roofs. On the front is a porch, and the windows are sashes. Inside, much of the timber framing remains.	II
14 and 16 High Street; 53.01204°N 2.22918°W		Early 17th century	A house, then a public house, and later used for other purposes, the building is partly timber framed, and partly rendered and painted to resemble timber framing, and has a tile roof. There are two storeys and an attic, the upper storey jettied, and two bays. In the ground floor is a shop front, the upper floor contains two mullioned oriel windows, and above are two dormers with gables that have ornate bargeboards and finials.	II
Barn, Dimsdale Hall Farm; 53.03302°N 2.23507°W	—	Early 17th century	A house, later a barn, it is in sandstone, and has coped gables. There are two storeys and three bays, and the windows are mullioned.	II
Old Bull's Head Inn; 53.01167°N 2.22767°W		Early 17th century (probable)	The public house was refronted in the 19th century. It is in stuccoed brick, and has a tile roof. There are two storeys and three bays. The doorway in the right bay has a moulded surround, and the windows are casements.	II
25 Ironmarket; 53.01211°N 2.22628°W		17th century	A shop with a timber framed core and cruck construction, it is faced with rendered brick, and has a tile roof. There are three storeys and two bays. In the ground floor is a 20th-century shop front, the upper floors contain sash windows, and there is a visible cruck truss in a gable wall.	II
65 Lower Street; 53.01091°N 2.23082°W		17th century	A house that has been altered and used for other purposes, it is in brick, with moulded string courses, an eaves band, and a tile roof. There are three storeys and six bays, with a gable over the right two bays. The doorway is in the fourth bay, it has a shell hood on moulded console brackets, and above it the windows are blind. The other windows are sashes. (Note: Street View in September 2018 shows that the building has been converted into a heritage centre.)	II
1, 3 and 5 Church Lane, Wolstanton; 53.02926°N 2.21545°W	—	c. 1700	A row of three cottages, possibly with an earlier core, in brick with pilasters, dentiled eaves and a tile roof. There are two storeys and four bays. In the centre is a gabled porch, and the windows are 20th-century casements.	II
Guildhall, High Street; 53.01082°N 2.22692°W		1713	The guildhall was remodelled in 1861. It is in red brick with stone dressings, on a stone plinth, with a string course, parapet eaves, and a tile roof. There are two storeys, and four bays that are divided by giant stone pilasters. The northwestern end is apsidal, and at the southeastern end is a stone Tuscan portico with a two-stage clock tower and a cupola. The windows are sashes with stone architraves.	II
Old Unitarian Meeting House, Lower Street; 53.01177°N 2.23041°W		1717	The Unitarian chapel is in rendered brick with a hipped tile roof. There is a tall single storey and an attic, which was added in 1926, three bays, and a single-depth plan. The doorway is to the right, there is a square window above, the other windows in the ground floor have segmental heads, and those in the attic are rectangular.	II
Chest tomb 53.01180°N 2.22942°W		1738	The tomb is in the churchyard of St Giles' Church, and is to the memory of Samuel Mayer. It is a chest tomb in stone, raised on steps, with a rectangular plan and a depressed pyramidal cap. On the long sides is lettering, and there are carved motifs on the angle pilasters and on the angles of the cap.	II
Fenton House, 5, 7 and 9 High Street; 53.01229°N 2.22916°W		1747	A house, later a shop, in brick with stone dressings, sill bands, a moulded eaves cornice surmounted by four urns, and a tile roof. There are three storeys and three bays, the middle bay projecting. In the ground floor is a modern shop front, and the upper floors contain sash windows in moulded stone architraves.	II
14, 15 and 16 Ironmarket; 53.01183°N 2.22711°W		Mid 18th century	A row of three brick shops with sill bands, moulded eaves cornices, and tile roofs. There are three storeys, and each shop has two bays. In the ground floor are 20th-century shop fronts, and the upper floors contain sash windows, those in the middle floor with shaped lintels and keystones.	II
Grave slab of Sarah Smith; 53.02984°N 2.21513°W		1763	The grave slab is in the churchyard of St Margaret's Church, and is to the memory of Sarah Smith. It is in stone and is rectangular with incised carving including a border. The inscription alleges that she was murdered by poisoning.	II
56A High Street; 53.01099°N 2.22788°W		Mid to late 18th century	Probably originally a house, later a shop, it is in red brick with a floor band, an eaves cornice, and a tile roof. There are three storeys and five bays, the middle three bays projecting under a pediment. In the ground floor are 19th-century shop fronts with Tuscan shafts carrying a moulded fascia. The upper floors contain sash windows with stuccoed heads and stressed keystones, the windows in the middle bay having architraves.	II
Carlton House, 48 and 50 Merrial Street; 53.01222°N 2.22857°W		1769	A large house that was extended to the right in the 19th century, and has since been used for other purposes. It is in rendered brick, with a fluted string course, a modillion cornice, and a tile roof. There are two storeys, and the original part has a front of five bays with a central doorway that has Tuscan columns and a segmental pediment. To the right is a three-bay full-height bay window containing tripartite windows, and with a hipped slate roof. The extension to the right of this has two bays and contains a round-headed doorway. All the windows are sashes.	II
3 and 5 Church Street; 53.01137°N 2.22938°W		Late 18th century	A shop with living accommodation above, it in brick with a moulded eaves cornice and a tile roof. There are three storeys and three bays. In the ground floor is a 19th-century shop front, to the left is a doorway with a modillion cornice, to the right is a round-headed entry, and the upper floors contain sash windows.	II
22 and 24 High Street; 53.01192°N 2.22915°W		Late 18th century	A pair of brick shops with a moulded eaves cornice and a tile roof. There are three storeys and four bays. In the ground floor are 19th-century shop fronts with fluted Corinthian pilasters on polygonal chamfered bases, and to the right is an entry. The upper floors contain sash windows with stuccoed heads.	II
28 High Street; 53.01171°N 2.22908°W		Late 18th century	A shop with living accommodation, it is in brick with a moulded eaves cornice and a tile roof. There are three storeys and two bays. In the ground floor is a 19th-century shop front with fluted pilasters, foliate spandrels, and a fascia with glass lettering. Above the fascia is a wrought iron balconette. The upper floors contain tripartite sash windows with stuccoed heads and stressed voussoirs.	II
75 and 77 High Street; 53.01031°N 2.22586°W		Late 18th century	Two houses, later a bank, the building was much altered in the 20th century by the insertion of a new ground floor. The building is in red brick with a modillion eaves cornice, and plain tiled eaves. There are three storeys and seven bays. The windows in the central bay have moulded architraves, the ground floor is in banded brick and stone, and above it is a cornice. The left bay contains a doorway that has a moulded surround, and a segmental hood under which is carving of foliage and a head.	II
9–13 Ironmarket; 53.01171°N 2.22736°W		Late 18th century	A brick shop with a sill band, a dentilled eaves cornice, and a tile roof. There are three storeys and three bays. In the ground floor are 20th-century shop fronts, and the upper floors contain casement windows, those in the middle floor with segmental heads and keystones.	II
8 King Street; 53.01314°N 2.22259°W		Late 18th century	A house, later used as an office, it is in brick with a slate roof. There are two storeys and three bays. The doorway has a moulded surround and a fanlight. In the ground floor are tripartite sash windows with voussoirs and keystones, and the upper floor contains sash windows with stuccoed heads.	II
Market Cross, High Street; 53.01095°N 2.22717°W		Late 18th century	The market cross, which was restored in the late 20th century, is in stone. It consists of a fluted Doric column with a cast iron lantern. The cross stands on a square plinth on circular steps.	II
85 High Street; 53.01008°N 2.22552°W		c. 1790	A shop in brick with a rendered ground floor and a tile roof. There are three storeys and two bays. On the top of the building is a pediment with a modillion cornice, and containing an oculus. The ground floor contains a shop front, the outer doors flanking the windows, and in the upper floors are sash windows.	II
Blast furnace, Chesterton; 53.04624°N 2.26824°W	—	1790–1801	The blast furnace, which is built into a slope, is in brick, and has sloping lower walls and a raking top. The tapping hole has a splayed archway, the square fire chamber is in stone, and it has a funnel-shaped shaft.	II
93 High Street; 53.00984°N 2.22533°W		c. 1800	A bank, later a shop, it is stuccoed, with quoins, parapet eaves, and a tile roof. There are two storeys and one bay. In the ground floor is a modern shop front, and above is a Palladian window with banded pilasters, a modillion cornice, and a segmental pediment. In front of the window is a decorative wrought iron balcony on stone console brackets.	II
1 King Street; 53.01310°N 2.22364°W		c. 1800	A house, later an office, in brick, with a string course, and an eaves cornice. There are three storeys and three bays. In the centre is a shop front, with a doorway in a stone architrave to the left. The windows are sashes.	II
12 King Street; 53.01322°N 2.22231°W		c. 1800	A house, later used for other purposes, it is in brick with a tile roof. There are three storeys and three bays. The central doorway has a moulded surround, a fanlight, and an entablature on console brackets. To the left is a canted bay window, and the other windows are sashes.	II
27 Marsh Parade; 53.01125°N 2.21894°W		c. 1800	A house, later an office, it is in brick, the ground floor is stuccoed, and it has a full-height pilaster on the right, a moulded eaves cornice, and a tile roof. There are three storeys and three bays. Steps lead up to the doorway in the left bay, which has a round head and a traceried fanlight, and the windows are sashes, and there is a wrought iron balcony on the middle floor.	II
6 and 8 Queen Street; 53.01384°N 2.22371°W		c. 1800	A pair of houses, later offices, they are in brick with sill bands, a moulded eaves cornice, and a Welsh slate roof. There are three storeys, the right house has a symmetrical front of three bays, the left house has a front of one bay and a rear wing. The right house has a central doorway with Ionic shafts, a pediment containing a sun motif, and below it is a plaque carved with Cupid on a lion. The doorway in the left house has a pediment on consoles, and a frieze with a heraldic device. The windows are sashes, the window above the right doorway in a stuccoed architrave, and in the left return is a long stair window.	II
Piers and Walls, Stubbs Walks; 53.01082°N 2.21919°W		c. 1800	Flanking the entrance to Stubbs Walks are four stone gate piers, each with a moulded frieze and cornice and a fluted domed shaft. These are linked by stone walls and railings with a curved plan.	II
26 High Street; 53.01178°N 2.22901°W		Late 18th or early 19th century	A shop on a corner site, it is in painted brick with a tile roof, three storeys, and two bays on each front. The southeast front contains a shop front, and there is a doorway in the northeast front. The windows are sashes with stuccoed voussoirs.	II
21 Marsh Parade; 53.01147°N 2.21890°W		1822	A silk mill on a corner site, later used as offices, it is in painted brick with a tile roof. There are three storeys, five bays on Marsh Parade, three bays in the gable end on Castle Street, and a rear wing with a dentilled eaves band and an attic with a dormer. The windows are sashes.	II
17 High Street; 53.01198°N 2.22881°W		Early 19th century	A shop on a corner site, it is in painted brick with a dentilled eaves cornice and a tile roof. There are three storeys and a curved front of three bays. In the ground floor is a 19th-century shop front with windows divided by pilasters, and a fascia with pediments. The upper floors contain sash windows.	II
51 High Street; 53.01100°N 2.22688°W		Early 19th century	A shop, incorporating 17th-century remains, it is in stuccoed brick, with angle pilasters, a plain eaves course, and a tile roof. There are three storeys and two bays. In the ground floor is a 20th-century shop front, and in the floors above are sash windows with architraves on corbels.	II
31 Ironmarket; 53.01240°N 2.22556°W		Early 19th century	A house, later offices, in brick, with a sill band, parapet eaves, and a tile roof. There are three storeys and five bays. In the centre is a projecting porch with pilasters and an open pediment, and the windows are sashes.	II
3 King Street; 53.01328°N 2.22315°W		Early 19th century	A house, later offices, it is in red brick with giant pilasters in the centre and at the ends, and a hipped slate roof. There are two storeys, four bays, and a rear extension. The open porch is on the right side and has fluted Ionic columns and an entablature. The windows are sashes with painted stucco heads and raised keystones.	II
7, 9 and 11 King Street; 53.01359°N 2.22179°W		Early 19th century	A row of three houses, later offices, in brick with a moulded eaves cornice and slate roofs. No. 7 has five bays, the left two bays with two storeys and the right three bays with three storeys. In the left bay is a wide entry, and in the second bay is a round-headed doorway with a fanlight. No. 9 has three bays and three storeys, and in the first bay steps lead up to a round-headed doorway with pilasters, a fanlight, and a pediment on brackets. No. 11 has four bays, the left three bays with three storeys, and the right bay with two storeys and containing a doorway similar to that in No. 9.	II
10 King Street; 53.01318°N 2.22244°W		Early 19th century	A brick house with a tile roof. There are three storeys, three bays, and two rear wings. In the centre steps lead up to a doorway with panelled reveals, a fanlight, and a pediment. To the right is a canted bay window, and the other windows are sashes.	II
23 and 25 Marsh Parade; 53.01134°N 2.21892°W		Early 19th century	A pair of houses, later offices, stuccoed, with giant pilasters, and a tile roof. There are three storeys, No. 23 has three bays, and No. 25 has four. The recessed doorways have round heads and traceried fanlights. The windows of No. 23 are sashes, and above the doorway they are blind. No. 25 has cross-casement windows.	II
1 and 2 Nelson Place; 53.01313°N 2.22387°W		Early 19th century	A pair of houses, later used as offices, in brick, with a sill band, an eaves cornice, and a slate roof. There are three storeys and five bays. Above the ground floor windows and doorways is a cornice forming an architrave. Some of the upper windows are sashes, and others are replacement casements with cast iron balconies.	II
Bradwell Lodge, Porthill; 53.03698°N 2.22324°W		Early 19th century	A house, later used for other purposes, it is in buff brick with stone dressings, a dentilled band, a cornice below overhanging eaves that have ornate bargeboards, and a Welsh slate roof. There are two storeys, an entrance front of two bays, and a garden front of three bays. On the entrance front is a porch with a round arched opening, grouped pilasters, and a gable with fretted bargeboards. To the right is a large circular bay with a conical roof with a ball finial, the middle window in the upper floor having a balcony. On the garden front the right two bays project, they are gabled, and in the upper floor is a fretted balcony.	II
Brampton House, 10 and 12 Queen Street; 53.01424°N 2.22347°W		Early 19th century	A house, later used as offices, it is in brick with a moulded eaves cornice, and a hipped Welsh slate roof. There are three storeys, sides of four bays, and a two-storey right wing. On the south front is a doorway with a pediment, flanked by canted bay windows. In the left return, facing the street, is a doorway with a moulded architrave, and a tripartite sash window to the left. The other windows are sashes with stuccoed heads.	II
Former Veterinary Surgery, Queen Street; 53.01364°N 2.22380°W		Early 19th century	The former veterinary surgery is in brick with stone dressings and a Welsh slate roof. There are two storeys and one bay on each front. On the south front is a window in each floor, the east front, facing the road has two blocked windows, and the north front is plain.	II
Queen's Chambers, 2 Queen Street; 53.01327°N 2.22398°W		Early 19th century	The house was extended later in the 19th century, and has since been used as offices. It is in brick with a moulded eaves cornice and a slate roof. There are two storeys and seven bays. The doorway has Tuscan shafts, a semicircular fanlight, and an open pediment. In the left bay is an archway, and the windows are sashes, some with stuccoed heads.	II
St George's Church; 53.01411°N 2.22428°W		1828	A Commissioners' church designed by Francis Bedford, it is built in brick faced with stone. The church consists of a nave, north and south aisles, a chancel, and a west tower embraced by the aisles. The tower has three stages, polygonal angle buttresses, a west door with a four-centred arch, and an embattled parapet with crocketed angle pinnacles. Along the sides of the church, the bays are divided by buttresses rising to crocketed pinnacles.	II*
Holy Trinity Church and war memorial 53.00865°N 2.22370°W		1833–34	A Roman Catholic church that was later extended, it is built in blue vitrified brick, with some ornamental brick, and slate roofs. The church has a rectangular plan, and consists of a nave with a clerestory, north and south aisles, and a short chancel with later additions at the east end. The west front is symmetrical with full-height pilasters dividing it into traceried panels, and tiers of blind arcading. There is an embattled parapet, higher over the nave, and a window with five lights. In the centre is an entrance with a pointed arch and there are similar but smaller arches to the aisles, that on the right containing a war memorial with a Celtic cross.	II*
Brampton Lodge; 53.01597°N 2.22355°W	—	c. 1836	The house is in stuccoed brick, with stone dressings, a hipped slate roof, and two storeys. On the south front is a central lean-to porch with a doorway that has a moulded surround and is flanked by sash windows, an above them is a cornice. To the left is a later bay.	II
1 Brampton Road; 53.01511°N 2.22343°W		c. 1836	The lodge to Brampton Lodge is in rusticated sandstone and has a hipped slate roof. There is a single storey and an L-shaped plan, and it contains a canted wooden mullioned bay window. The doorway is recessed to the right.	II
Wall, piers and bollards, Brampton Lodge; 53.01521°N 2.22326°W	—	c. 1836	The wall encloses the garden of Brampton Lodge and its gate lodge. It is in sandstone with rounded coping. The wall incorporates gate piers and three stone bollards that have been moved from elsewhere. The piers have flat coping.	II
18A High Street; 53.01201°N 2.22919°W		c. 1840	A shop in painted brick with stone dressings and a tile roof. There are three storeys and one bay. In the ground floor is a modern shop front, the middle floor contains a three-light oriel window, and in the top floor is a three-light mullioned window with a stepped hood mould and a pierced quatrefoil. At the top is a gable with ornamental bargeboards and spiked finials.	II
Clayton Hall; 52.98844°N 2.21850°W	—	c. 1840	A large house, later used as a school, it is in painted brick with stuccoed dressings, an eaves cornice, and a slate roof. There are two storeys, and the main block has a front of three bays divided by pilasters. In the centre is a porch with angle pilasters, Ionic columns, a frieze, and a moulded cornice. This is flanked by tripartite sash windows in architraves with cornice hoods on consoles. In the centre of the building is a balustraded lantern with an arcade of three arched windows. To the left of the main block is a lower wing of seven bays ending in a corner turret of three storeys with a pyramidal roof.	II
Remains of chimney, Apedale; 53.03644°N 2.27474°W		1840	The base of the mine chimney remains, it is in red brick, with decoration and diapering in yellow and blue brick. The chimney has a square plan with chamfered corners, and on each side are recessed brick panels with diapering, and stone panels with inscriptions of dates and mottoes.	II
Old Orme Boys' Primary School, Pool Dam; 53.00882°N 2.23133°W		1850	The former school is in stone with tile roofs, and mainly has two storeys. There is an E-shaped plan with a central range of three bays and flanking gabled wings with extensions. The central range has a doorway with a moulded four-centred arch, mullioned windows with moulded hood moulds, and three gabled dormers. The wing to the right contains a canted bay window with an embattled parapet, and the bay to the left contains a large mullioned and transomed window. Further to the left is another gabled wing, with a Venetian window in the upper floor. On the front facing Orme Road is a porch with gargoyles and an embattled parapet, and at the rear is a bellcote.	II
Holy Trinity Church, Chesterton; 53.04194°N 2.25292°W		1851–52	The church is in sandstone with a tile roof, and consists of a nave, north and south aisles, a chancel and a south steeple. The steeple has a tower with three stages, a corbel table, and a broach spire with two tiers of lucarnes. Most of the windows are lancets, and the east window has three lights.	II
The Barracks Workshops, Barracks Road; 53.00995°N 2.22401°W		1855	A military barracks, later converted into workshops, the building is in red brick with stone dressings and a tile roof. It consists of ranges of one and two-storeys around a central courtyard, with towers at the angles. In the centre of the front facing the road is a round-arched doorway, and above it is a turret on corbels with a hipped roof. The range has two storeys, three bays on each side of the central bay, outside which are two lower bays, and three-storey two-bay towers. The windows are mullioned with round-headed lights.	II
Ebenezer House, Merrial Street; 53.01329°N 2.22527°W		1857–58	A Methodist chapel, later converted for commercial use, it is in red brick with stone dressings and a tile roof. The pedimented gabled front faces the street and has a modillion cornice. In the centre is a portico containing two doorways with segmental heads in an architrave with an entablature. Above this is a string course, and four round-arched sash windows with moulded architraves and segmental pediments on consoles.	II
Congregational Church, King Street; 53.01320°N 2.22201°W		1859	The church, which was restored in 1990, is built in buff brick with bands of blue stone dressings, and it has a slate roof. The entrance front faces the street, and there is an octagonal turret to the right containing lancet windows and with a broach spire. In the centre, steps lead up to a triple entrance arcade, over which are pointed hood moulds. Above this is a large rose window, and the front is flanked by buttresses.	II
St Margaret's Church, Wolstanton; 53.02970°N 2.21559°W		1859–60	The church includes earlier, medieval material, especially in the steeple, and the chancel was added by Anthony Salvin. It is built in sandstone and has tiled roofs, and is in Decorated style. The church consists of a nave, north and south aisles, a chancel, and a north steeple. The steeple has a tower with three stages, a parapet with pinnacles, and a recessed octagonal spire.	II*
Cemetery Chapels; 53.00502°N 2.22743°W		1866	The chapels in the centre of the cemetery, designed by Bellamy and Hardy, are in stone and have slate roofs with crested ridges. There is a symmetrical plan with two chapels flanking a central arcade of three arches, the central arch the largest, and with an ogee head. Above this is a steeple with crocketed pinnacles and a broach spire. The chapels are linked to the entrance, and have windows with Decorated tracery.	II
Cemetery Railings and Gates; 53.00670°N 2.22853°W		1866 (probable)	The cast iron railings stand on a rusticated stone plinth with steep coping. The railings are divided into panelled bays by openwork cast iron piers surmounted by fleur-de-lys finials, and the panels contain ornate tracery. The main entrance gates are recessed, and they are flanked by pedestrian gates.	II
School, Wolstanton; 53.03009°N 2.21636°W		1871	The school, designed by James Brooks, is in brick and has a tile roof with a crested ridge. The plan consists of a front range and two rear wings. The range facing High Street has seven bays and a single storey, and it contains a doorway with a Gothic arch. The range facing Knutton Road has ten bays, and a lower storey to the left on a sloping site. The right two bays on this front have a part tile-hung gable with an attic. The windows are mullioned and recessed behind columns, and those in the lower storey have diapering under semicircular hood moulds.	II
School House, Wolstanton; 53.02983°N 2.21729°W	—	1871	The house, designed by James Brooks, is in brick and has a tile roof with a crested ridge. There are two storeys and two bays, the left bay projecting under a gable. This bay contains a mullioned and transomed window in the ground floor, and an oriel window above, and the porch is to the right.	II
Milepost; 53.01540°N 2.21543°W		c. 1879	The milepost is on the north side of Etruria Road. It is in cast iron, and consists of a cylindrical post with a fluted domed top, and an attached rectangular plate. On the plate are inscribed the distances to Newcastle-under-Lyme and to Leek.	II
Victoria Statue, Queen's Gardens; 53.01234°N 2.22475°W		1903	The statue, by Charles Bell Birch, is in bronze, and depicts Queen Victoria standing and holding the orb and sceptre. It stands on a plinth of polished granite, with inscriptions on the front and the rear. The statue was moved to its present location in 2001.	II
St Paul's Church; 53.01036°N 2.21975°W		1905–08	The church is in red sandstone with a tile roof. It consists of a nave with a high clerestory, a west porch, north and south aisles, a chancel, and a northwest steeple. The steeple has a tower with three stages, angle buttresses, an octagonal lantern with a parapet, and a spire with two tiers of lucarnes. In the base of the tower is a doorway with an ogee arch and a niche above containing a statue. The west window is large, with seven lights, and the east window has five lights.	II
Lancaster Buildings, High Street; 53.01112°N 2.22758°W		1936–40	A block of shops and offices with a steel frame, fronted in red brick, with dressings in stone and false marble, and a hipped tile roof. There are three storeys, with shops in the ground floor, fronts of seven, seven and five bays, and curved bays on the corners. The windows are metal-framed, and are curved on the corners.	II
Bradwell House; 16 and 18 King Street; 53.01339°N 2.22164°W		Undated	A house, later used as an office, it is stuccoed, the ground floor rusticated, with quoins, an eaves cornice, and a slate roof. There are three storeys and three bays. In the centre is a doorway with a Tuscan portico, to the left of it is a canted bay window, and to the right is a tripartite window with a central pediment. The windows in the upper floors are sashes, those in the middle floor in stuccoed architraves with pedimented heads.	II

== Notes and references ==
=== Sources ===
- Historic England, "Castle Foundations, Newcastle-under-Lyme (1196763)", National Heritage List for England
- Historic England, "Church of St Giles, Newcastle-under-Lyme (1297603)", National Heritage List for England
- Historic England, "Boozy Dog Public House, Newcastle-under-Lyme (1219687)", National Heritage List for England
- Historic England, "The Wine Vaults Public House, Newcastle-under-Lyme (1196521)", National Heritage List for England
- Historic England, "Bradwell Hall, Newcastle-under-Lyme (1196516)", National Heritage List for England
- Historic England, "Nos. 14 and 16 High Street, Newcastle-under-Lyme (1219576)", National Heritage List for England
- Historic England, "Old barn at Dimsdale Hall Farm, Newcastle-under-Lyme (1219561)", National Heritage List for England
- Historic England, "Old Bull's Head Inn, Newcastle-under-Lyme (1219722)", National Heritage List for England
- Historic England, "No. 25 Ironmarket, Newcastle-under-Lyme (1219681)", National Heritage List for England
- Historic England, "Maxims Wine Bar, Newcastle-under-Lyme (1219746)", National Heritage List for England
- Historic England, "Nos. 1, 3 and 5 Church Lane, Newcastle-under-Lyme (1219534)", National Heritage List for England
- Historic England, "Guildhall, Newcastle-under-Lyme (1196523)", National Heritage List for England
- Historic England, "Old Unitarian Meeting House, Newcastle-under-Lyme (1297486)", National Heritage List for England
- Historic England, "Chest Tomb in Church yard circa 10 metres north of Church, Newcastle-under-Lyme (1219557)", National Heritage List for England
- Historic England, "Fenton House, Newcastle-under-Lyme (1196519)", National Heritage List for England
- Historic England, "Nos. 14, 15 and 16 Ironmarket, Newcastle-under-Lyme (1196524)", National Heritage List for England
- Historic England, "Grave slab of Sarah Smith, Newcastle-under-Lyme (1458049)", National Heritage List for England
- Historic England, "No. 56A High Street, Newcastle-under-Lyme (1297606)", National Heritage List for England
- Historic England, "Carlton House, Newcastle-under-Lyme (1291257)", National Heritage List for England
- Historic England, "Nos. 3 and 5 Church Street, Newcastle-under-Lyme (1219543)", National Heritage List for England
- Historic England, "Nos. 22 and 24 High Street, Newcastle-under-Lyme (1219601)", National Heritage List for England
- Historic England, "No. 28 High Street, Newcastle-under-Lyme (1291369)", National Heritage List for England
- Historic England, "Nos. 75 and 77 High Street, Newcastle-under-Lyme (1291384)", National Heritage List for England
- Historic England, "Nos. 9–13 Ironmarket, Newcastle-under-Lyme (1219674)", National Heritage List for England
- Historic England, "No. 8 King Street, Newcastle-under-Lyme (1297483)", National Heritage List for England
- Historic England, "Market Cross, Newcastle-under-Lyme (1219669)", National Heritage List for England
- Historic England, "No. 85 High Street, Newcastle-under-Lyme (1196522)", National Heritage List for England
- Historic England, "Blast Furnace, Newcastle-under-Lyme (1219970)", National Heritage List for England
- Historic England, "No. 93 High Street, Newcastle-under-Lyme (1219650)", National Heritage List for England
- Historic England, "No. 1 King Street, Newcastle-under-Lyme (1196754)", National Heritage List for England
- Historic England, "No. 12 King Street, Newcastle-under-Lyme (1196757)", National Heritage List for England
- Historic England, "No. 27 Marsh Parade, Newcastle-under-Lyme (1196761)", National Heritage List for England
- Historic England, "Nos. 6 and 8 Queen Street, Newcastle-under-Lyme (1196762)", National Heritage List for England
- Historic England, "Stone Entrance Piers and Walls to Stubbs Walks, Newcastle-under-Lyme (1219994)", National Heritage List for England
- Historic England, "No. 26 High Street, Newcastle-under-Lyme (1297605)", National Heritage List for England
- Historic England, "No. 21 Marsh Parade, Newcastle-under-Lyme (1196760)", National Heritage List for England
- Historic England, "No. 17 High Street, Newcastle-under-Lyme (1291394)", National Heritage List for England
- Historic England, "No. 51 High Street, Newcastle-under-Lyme (1219615)", National Heritage List for England
- Historic England, "No. 31 Ironmarket, Newcastle-under-Lyme (1196525)", National Heritage List for England
- Historic England, "No. 3 King Street, Newcastle-under-Lyme (1297482)", National Heritage List for England
- Historic England, "Nos. 7, 9 and 11 King Street, Newcastle-under-Lyme (1196755)", National Heritage List for England
- Historic England, "No. 10 King Street, Newcastle-under-Lyme (1196756)", National Heritage List for England
- Historic England, "Nos. 23 and 25 March Parade, Newcastle-under-Lyme (1219850)", National Heritage List for England
- Historic England, "Nos. 1 and 2 Nelson Place, Newcastle-under-Lyme (1219884)", National Heritage List for England
- Historic England, "Bradwell Lodge, Newcastle-under-Lyme (1196515)", National Heritage List for England
- Historic England, "Brampton House, Newcastle-under-Lyme (1297449)", National Heritage List for England
- Historic England, "Former Veterinary Surgery adjoining Nos. 6 and 8 Queen Street, Newcastle-under-Lyme (1219912)", National Heritage List for England
- Historic England, "Queen's Chambers, Newcastle-under-Lyme (1219897)", National Heritage List for England
- Historic England, "Church of St George, Newcastle-under-Lyme (1219946)", National Heritage List for England
- Historic England, "Roman Catholic Church of the Holy Trinity and war memorial, Newcastle-under-Lyme (1196759)", National Heritage List for England
- Historic England, "Brampton Lodge, Newcastle-under-Lyme (1297602)", National Heritage List for England
- Historic England, "No. 1 Brampton Road, Newcastle-under-Lyme (1219519)", National Heritage List for England
- Historic England, "Garden wall of Brampton Lodge and 3 stone bollards, Newcastle-under-Lyme (1291409)", National Heritage List for England
- Historic England, "No. 18A High Street, Newcastle-under-Lyme (1196520)", National Heritage List for England
- Historic England, "Clayton Hall, Newcastle-under-Lyme (1297604)", National Heritage List for England
- Historic England, "Remains of Chimney, Newcastle-under-Lyme (1291460)", National Heritage List for England
- Historic England, "Old Orme Boys' Primary School, Newcastle-under-Lyme (1297487)", National Heritage List for England
- Historic England, "Church of Holy Trinity, Newcastle-under-Lyme (1196518)", National Heritage List for England
- Historic England, "The Barracks Workshops, Newcastle-under-Lyme (1291465)", National Heritage List for England
- Historic England, "Ebenezer House, Newcastle-under-Lyme (1219957)", National Heritage List for England
- Historic England, "Newcastle Congregational Church, Newcastle-under-Lyme (1196758)", National Heritage List for England
- Historic England, "Church of St Margaret, Newcastle-under-Lyme (1196517)", National Heritage List for England
- Historic England, "Cemetery Chapels, Newcastle-under-Lyme (1291319)", National Heritage List for England
- Historic England, "Cemetery Railings and Gates, Newcastle-under-Lyme (1219842)", National Heritage List for England
- Historic England, "School, Newcastle-under-Lyme (1219720)", National Heritage List for England
- Historic England, "School House, Newcastle-under-Lyme (1297485)", National Heritage List for England
- Historic England, "Milepost southwest of 'The Polite Vicar' Public House (NGR SJ8563946477), Newcastle-under-Lyme (1392367)", National Heritage List for England
- Historic England, "Victoria Statue in Queen's Gardens, Newcastle-under-Lyme (1196764)", National Heritage List for England
- Historic England, "Church of St Paul, Newcastle-under-Lyme (1297450)", National Heritage List for England
- Historic England, "Lancaster Buildings, Newcastle-under-Lyme (1391417)", National Heritage List for England
- Historic England, "Bradwell House, Newcastle-under-Lyme (1297484)", National Heritage List for England
- Historic England, Listed Buildings
- Pevsner, Nikolaus (1974), Staffordshire, The Buildings of England, Harmondsworth: Penguin Books, ISBN 0-14-071046-9
