= Porthill Players =

Amateur theatre group in Staffordshire

- Formation: 1911; 114 years ago
- Type: Theatre group
- Purpose: Amateur theatrical group
- Location: Staffordshire, England

Porthill Players is an amateur theatre group in Staffordshire, England.

== History ==
=== Early years ===
The Porthill Players was formed in 1911. The first production by the Porthill Players was a pantomime of Aladdin which was performed at the church hall at ST Andrew's Church in Porthill.

=== Later years ===
The Porthill Players were the first theatre company to perform at the Regent Theatre in Stoke-on-Trent following its refurbishment in 1999 with their production of "Songs from the Shows" on 17 September 1999.

On 4 2014 it was announced that the singer and songwriter Jackie Trent was working with the Porthill Players on a musical about her life called "The Jackie Trent Story".

On 1 August 2023 it was announced that the Porthill Players planned to disband at the end of 2023 due to low membership numbers and the cost of putting on productions.

== Past performances ==
- Aladdin (1911)
- Songs from the Shows (17 September 1999)
