= Henry Faulds =

Scottish doctor, missionary and scientist

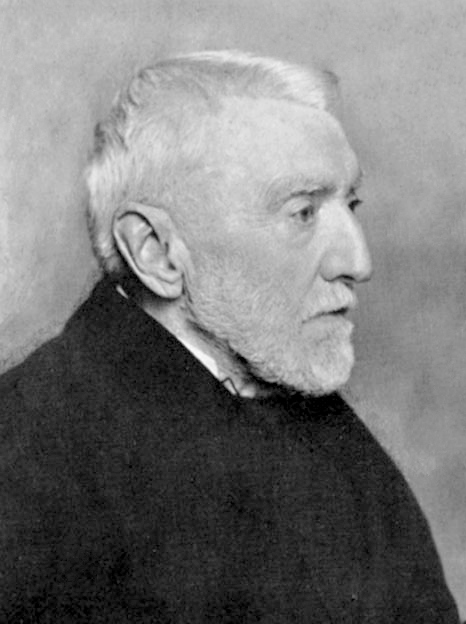
Henry Faulds

Henry Faulds (1 June 1843 – 24 March 1930) was a Scottish doctor, missionary and scientist who is noted for the development of fingerprinting.

== Early life ==
Faulds was born in Beith, North Ayrshire, into a family of modest means. Aged 13, he was forced to leave school, and went to Glasgow to work as a clerk to help support his family; at 21 he decided to enrol at the Facility of Arts at Glasgow University, where he studied mbecame a medical missionary for the Church of Scotland. In 1871, he was sent to British India, where he worked for two years in Darjeeling at a hospital for the poor.

On 23 July 1873, he received a letter of appointment from the United Presbyterian Church of Scotland to establish a medical mission in Japan. He married Isabella Wilson that September, and the newlyweds departed for Japan in December.

== Life in Japan ==
Faulds established the first English speaking mission in Japan in 1874, with a hospital and a teaching facility for Japanese medical students. He helped introduce Joseph Lister's antiseptic methods to Japanese surgeons. In 1875, he helped found the Rakuzenkai, Japan's first society for the blind, and set up lifeguard stations to prevent drowning in nearby canals. He halted a rabies epidemic that killed small children who played with infected mice, and he helped stop the spread of cholera in Japan. He even cured a plague infecting the local fishmonger's stock of carp. In 1880 he helped found a school for the blind. By 1882, his Tsukiji Hospital in Tokyo treated 15,000 patients annually. Faulds became fluent in Japanese, and in addition to his full-time work as a doctor, he wrote two books on travel in the Far East, many academic articles, and started three magazines.

Whilst accompanying a friend (American archaeologist, Edward S. Morse) to an archaeological dig he noticed how the delicate impressions left by craftsmen could be discerned in ancient clay fragments. Examining his own fingertips and those of friends, he became convinced that the pattern of ridges was unique to each individual.

Shortly after these observations his hospital was broken into. The local police arrested a member of staff whom Faulds believed to be innocent. Determined to exonerate the man, he compared the fingerprints left behind at the crime scene to those of the suspect and found them to be different. On the strength of this evidence the police agreed to release the suspect.

In an attempt to promote the idea of fingerprint identification he sought the help of the noted naturalist Charles Darwin. Darwin declined to work on the idea, but passed it on to his relative Francis Galton, who forwarded it to the Anthropological Society of London. When Galton returned to the topic some eight years later, he paid little attention to Faulds' letter. As a result of this interchange some controversy has arisen about the inventor of modern forensic fingerprinting. However, there can be no doubt that Faulds' first paper on the subject was published in the scientific journal Nature in 1880; all parties conceded this.

The following month Sir William Herschel, a British civil servant based in India, wrote to Nature saying that he had been using fingerprints (as a form of bar code) to identify criminals since 1860. However, Herschel did not mention their potential for forensic use. Over the years, Faulds conducted a bitter controversy with Herschel over the use of fingerprints, demanding proof in 1894 that Herschel had ever used fingerprints officially, which Herschel duly provided, and then writing a series of books and pamphlets many years later containing variations of the argument that he had been cheated his due credit (see for complete facsimiles of these and other fundamental works on fingerprinting, and the Herschel/Faulds letters). These books were published from 1905 onward, long after fingerprinting had come into widespread use.

== Return to Britain ==
Returning to Britain in 1886, after a quarrel with the missionary society which ran his hospital in Japan, Faulds offered the concept of fingerprint identification to Scotland Yard but he was dismissed, most likely because he did not present the extensive evidence required to show that prints are durable, unique and practically classifiable. Subsequently, Faulds returned to the life of a police surgeon, at first in London, and then in the Stoke-on-Trent town of Fenton. In 1922 he sold his practice and moved to James Street in nearby Wolstanton, where he died in March 1930 aged 86, bitter at the lack of recognition he had received for his work. In 2007 a plaque acknowledging Faulds' work was unveiled at Bank House, near to Wolstanton's St Margaret's churchyard where his grave can be seen. In 2011, a plaque was unveiled at his former James Street residence. On 12 November 2004 a memorial was dedicated to his memory in Beith town centre close to the site of the house in New Street where he was born.

== Legacy ==
The method of identifying criminals by their fingerprints had been introduced in the 1860s by Sir William James Herschel in India, and their potential use in forensic work was first proposed by in 1880. Galton, following the idea written by Faulds, which he failed to credit, was the first to place the study on a scientific footing, which assisted its acceptance by the courts. The Japanese police officially adopted the fingerprinting system in 1911.

His clinic in Tokyo was bought by Ludolph Teusler and became St. Luke's International Hospital.
