= Sneyd Colliery Disaster =

Coal mine disaster in England

Snyed Colliery Disaster
- Date: 1 January 1942
- Time: 7:50 am
- Location: Burslem; 53.046581°N 2.182513°W
- Deaths: 57
- Verdict: underground explosion

The Sneyd Colliery Disaster was a coal mining accident on 1 January 1942 in Burslem in the English city of Stoke-on-Trent. An underground explosion occurred at 7:50 am, caused by sparks from wagons underground igniting coal dust. A total of 57 men and boys died.

== Background ==
Coal mining in the Sneyd area of Burslem had been ongoing since the 18th century. Records show that at 1896, Sneyd No. 2 and Sneyd No. 3 had a combined total of 609 men and boys working underground with 124 people employed upon the surface. The company was officially registered as Sneyd Colliery in 1900. By 1940, the mine was being worked by 2,000 men and boys when it was recorded that they were idle as an underground fire had been discovered. The mine, like many others, had suffered deaths before such as in 1904 when a fire broke out and killed three workers.

== The explosion ==
Due to an old superstition that said the cutting of coal on New Year's was unlucky, miners traditionally did not work on New Year's Day; but because of the war effort, the men of Sneyd turned out to work a normal day. 295 men were working in No. 4 pit when at 7:50 am an explosion occurred in the Banbury seam which was 0.5 miles (0.80 km) underground. The force of the explosion was powerful enough to blow men off their feet; one apprentice, Reg Grocott (16) was blown around a corner and his trajectory was stopped by a water drum. The man he was working with was not so lucky having been thrown against a wall and killed.

The explosion had been contained to one coalface in the Banbury Seam of No. 4 pit which had 61 men working in it with four of the men escaping alive. All other workings were unaffected by the explosion, but all miners were evacuated from the No. 2 pit and the other areas of No. 4 pit.

55 workers were killed outright with two injured men dying of their injuries in hospital.

== Rescue ==
News of the explosion soon spread through the community and wives and relatives ran to the pit head to wait for news. The bodies of 16 men were recovered on the first day, when rescue operations had to be abandoned due to the presence of afterdamp. It was announced at that time that there was no hope of finding anyone else alive. The Sneyd Mines Rescue Team were the first to enter the mine but other teams were quickly drafted in from other collieries across north Staffordshire (Black Bull, Chatterley Whitfield, Hanley Deep & Shelton).

== Aftermath ==
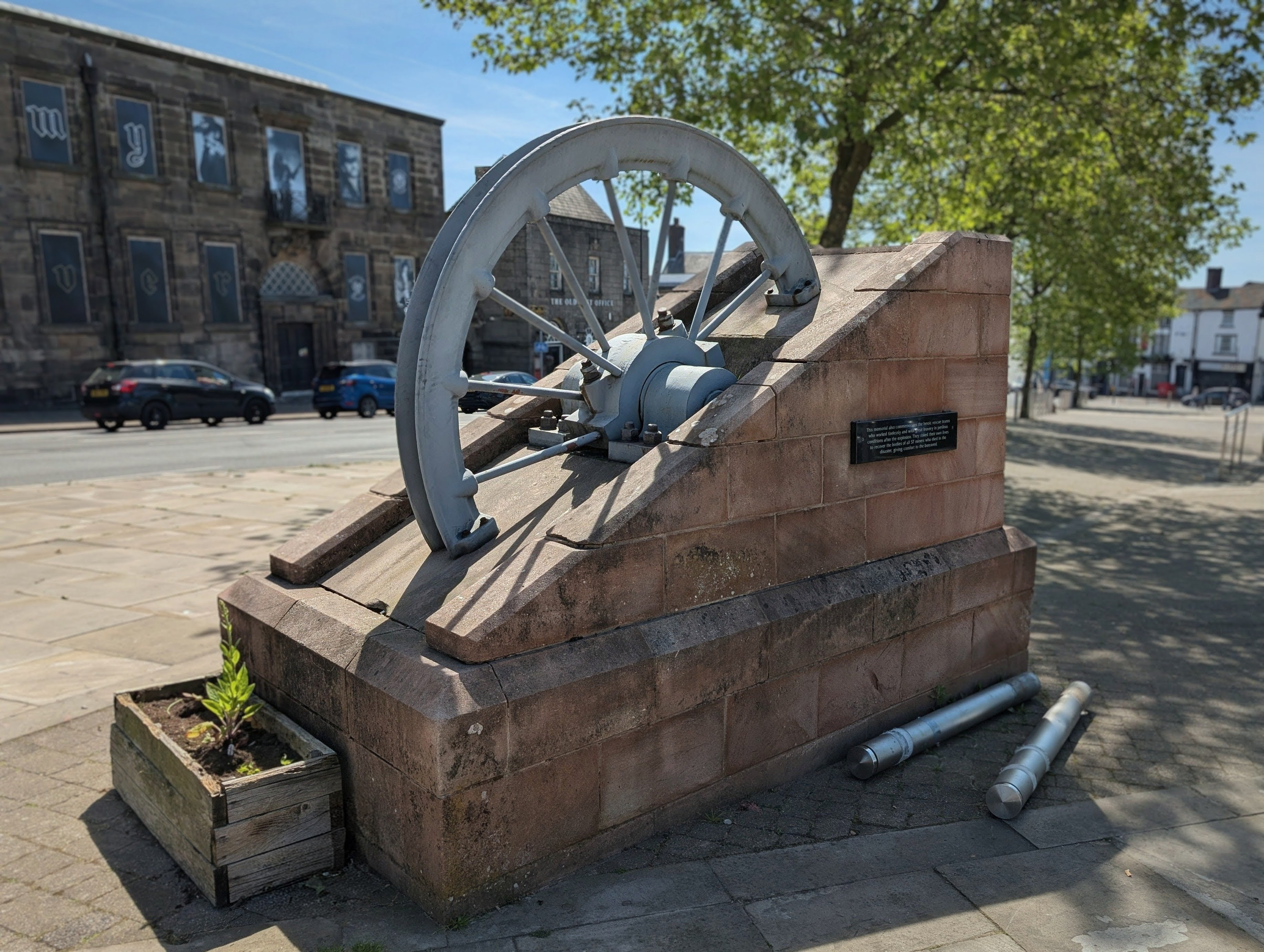
Memorial in Burslem

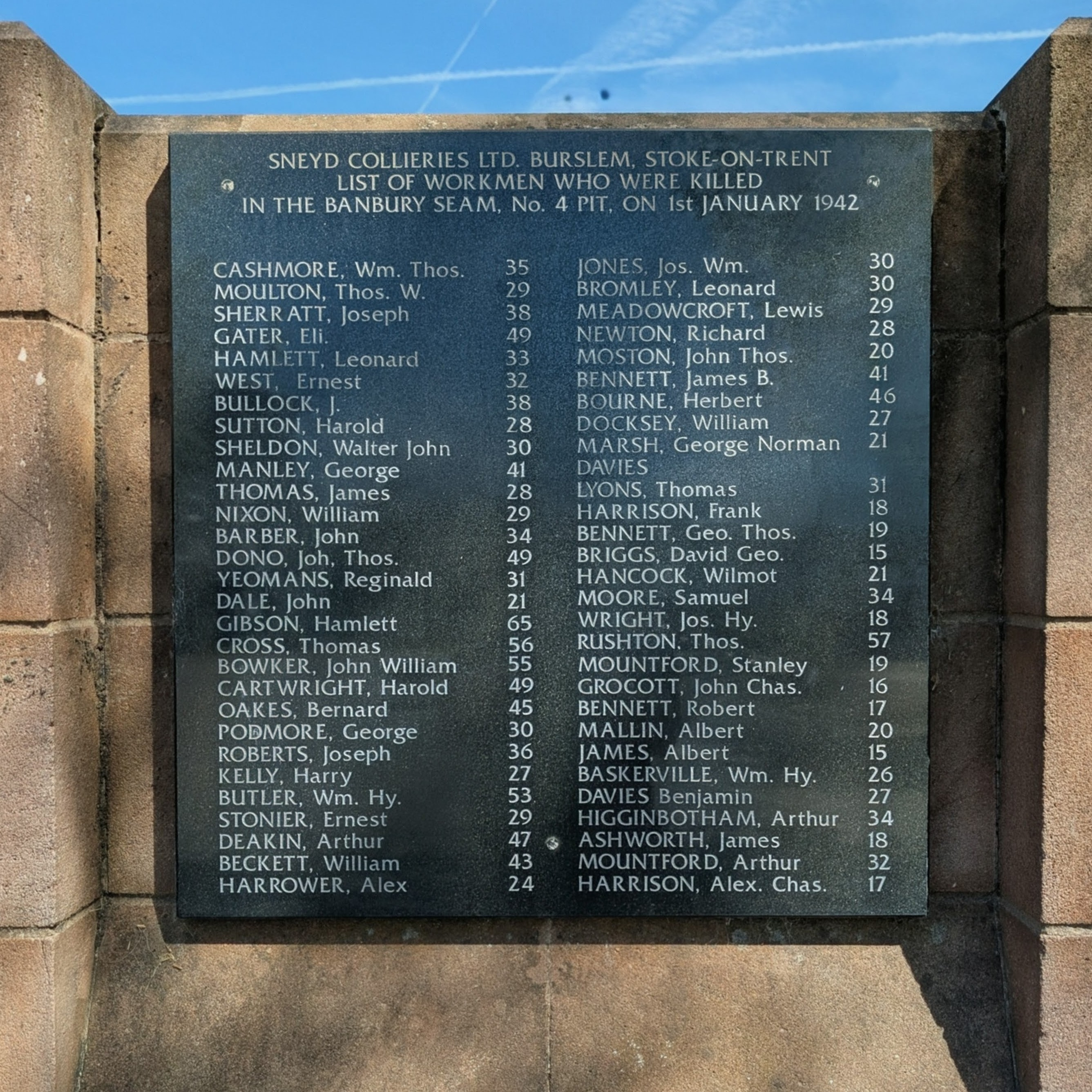
Memorial Plaque

A fund was set up in the immediate aftermath to which many members of the public submitted money to, including people as far away as serving soldiers in Iceland. The final death toll of 57 also resulted in 32 widows, 35 children were left without fathers and the 24 men who were unmarried left 8 mothers who were also widows and 13 had grieving mothers and fathers. The resultant inquiry headed by Sir Henry Walker found that tubs used to move the coal out of the mine had derailed from their runners and damaged an electric cable. The sparks had ignited coal dust and caused an explosion. This version of events has been disputed in recent times with historians laying the blame on a steel cable that snapped and sparked. Others have said that the descending empty tubs hit a compressed air pipe which caused dust to billow out and a spark ignited it. They also claim the cable was lab tested and found to be inherently safe.

The mine was linked underground to Wolstanton Colliery, and after the explosion, all coal was raised at Wolstanton rather than Sneyd. Sneyd Colliery closed in the 1960s. A memorial featuring a pit wheel was unveiled in Burslem town centre in 2007. It bears a plaque listing the names of all 57 miners who died.
