= Rykeneld Street =

Roman road in England

Rykeneld Street or Ryknield Street was a Roman road which ran through the northern Midlands of England from Deva (Chester) to Derventio (Derby) via what is now Stoke-on-Trent. It is not to be confused with the Icknield Street. It has in the past also been called by Victorian antiquarians the "Via Devina". The territory traversed would have been that of the Cornovii.

== Route ==
Beginning at Chester the road ran south-east to a known Roman fort structure at Chesterton in North Staffordshire (partly excavated with modern methods from 1969 to 1971). It then ran through Wolstanton, as discovered when the Marsh was partly drained in the 1870s, then in a major educational excavation in the 1960s, and a lesser one in 1995.

"The road surface was made up of thick sandstone blocks, on a foundation of a thick layer of clay on gravel. The road was 20 feet wide between the kerbstones. The surface had been repaired at some time with pebbles in one area."

The road then ran from Wolstanton along the valley ridge to drop down into the often-flooded Fowlea Valley. Local historians suspect that the road dropped into the valley at Basford to meet a raised causeway across the valley bottom at Etruria. From there it reached the site of the modern Stoke-on-Trent railway station.

The road then crossed the young River Trent and ran down Lane Delph (now the end of the modern King Street, Fenton), toward Normacot. There is documentary evidence in the 1223 foundation charter of the Abbey of Hulton in Stoke-on-Trent which names the (then still existing) Rykeneld Street as a boundary of the lands at Normacot assigned to the Abbey. The road then ran to Blythe Bridge and on to Uttoxeter. The line of the road at Uttoxeter was described and traced by Francis Redfern (1873).

== Related structures and finds ==
Various Roman relics have been found along the route in North Staffordshire, including a well-preserved updraught pottery kiln at Trent Vale in Stoke-on-Trent with supporting coin and pottery finds. A Roman hoard was found at Longton, on the line of the road through Stoke-on-Trent, in 1960.

The Roman fort at Chesterton has already been mentioned. There was also a large specialised industrial centre near to Chesterton at Holditch, possibly of independent miners and metalworking artisans supplying the passing military trade on the Rykeneld Street. For a detailed summary account of the excavations and evidence for this settlement see Burnham and Watcher (1990).
