= Unitarian Meeting House, Newcastle-under-Lyme =

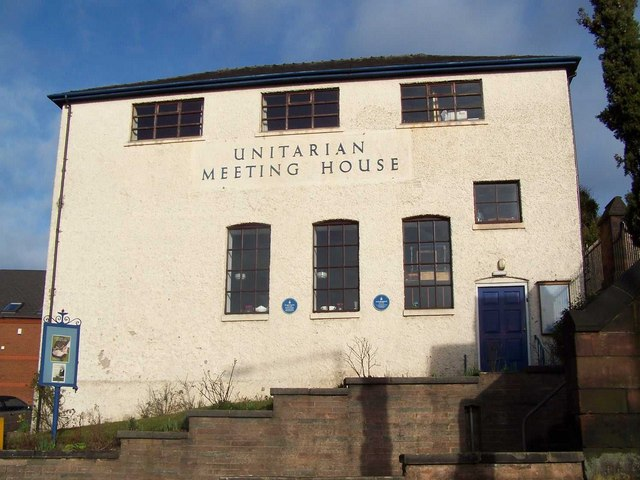
- Unitarian Meeting House, Newcastle-under-Lyme
- 53°00′42.28″N 2°13′49.32″W
- OS grid reference: SJ 84641 46073
- Location: Newcastle-under-Lyme, Staffordshire
- Country: England
- Denomination: Unitarian
- Website: www.newcastlestaffsunitarians.co.uk

Architecture
- Heritage designation: Grade II
- Designated: 27 September 1972
- Completed: 1717

The Unitarian Meeting House is a Unitarian chapel on Lower Street in Newcastle-under-Lyme, Staffordshire, England. The building, dating from 1717, is thought to be the earliest surviving nonconformist chapel in north Staffordshire. It is Grade II listed.

== History and description ==
The original meeting house, built here in 1675, was destroyed by fire in 1715 by local people who opposed religious nonconformity. The present building was erected in 1717; it is thought to be the earliest surviving nonconformist chapel in north Staffordshire. It was the place of worship of Josiah Wedgwood and his siblings, whose mother was the daughter of the Unitarian minister. Joseph Priestley also led worship here.

It is a brick building finished in roughcast render, with a tile roof. The congregation space, and gallery above, remains in the layout of the original building. The gallery panelling and stair balustrade date from the 18th century. An attic storey, which is open plan, was added in 1926. The pews, fitted in 1957, were formerly in the demolished Wesleyan Chapel in Brunswick Street, Newcastle-under-Lyme..The pews were removed in 2015 to allow for more flexibility in worship, although side and back pews remain.

== See also ==
- Listed buildings in Newcastle-under-Lyme
