= Harry Sharpe (cricketer) =

English cricketer and Royal Navy officer

Personal information
- Full name: Harry Wetherherd Sharpe
- Born: 14 August 1901; Wolstanton, Staffordshire, England
- Died: 8 July 1950 (aged 48); Stubbington, Hampshire, England
- Batting: Right-handed
- Role: Wicket-keeper

Career statistics
Competition	First-class
Matches	3
Runs scored	35
Batting average	7.00
100s/50s	–/–
Top score	17
Catches/stumpings	6/3
- Source: Cricinfo, 17 December 2019

Harry Wetherherd Sharpe (14 August 1901 – 8 July 1950) was an English first-class cricketer and Royal Navy officer.

Born at Wolstanton, Staffordshire in August 1901, Sharpe served in the Royal Navy. He was commissioned shortly after the First World War and by September 1921, he was a sub-lieutenant. He was promoted to the rank of lieutenant in September 1923. Sharpe made three appearances in first-class cricket for the Royal Navy in 1929, playing against the Marylebone Cricket Club, the British Army cricket team and the Royal Air Force. Playing as a wicket-keeper, he scored 35 runs and took six catches and made three stumpings. He was promoted to the rank of lieutenant commander in September 1931 and later served in the Second World War. He was seconded to the Royal Indian Navy in 1944, with Sharpe retiring in 1947 with the rank of commander. He died in July 1950 at Stubbington, Hampshire.
