= Porthill, Staffordshire =

Suburb of Newcastle-under-Lyme

Coordinates: 53.0369°N 2.2223°W

Porthill
- Location within Staffordshire
- Population: 4,080 (2001 Census)
- OS grid reference: SJ851488
- District: Newcastle-under-Lyme
- Shire county: Staffordshire
- Region: West Midlands
- Country: England
- Sovereign state: United Kingdom
- Post town: NEWCASTLE
- Postcode district: ST5
- Dialling code: 01782
- Police: Staffordshire
- Fire: Staffordshire
- Ambulance: West Midlands
- UK Parliament: Newcastle-under-Lyme

Porthill is a suburb of Newcastle-under-Lyme and a ward in the Borough of Newcastle-under-Lyme in Staffordshire, England. Porthill Bank is the main backbone with streets such as Vale View, First Avenue, and Inglewood Drive leading from it. Clare avenue is the west boundary, with anything before it forming part of the porthill area, including minor streets like Garnett road West and Dain place. It is a major transport link as the A500 can be easily accessed from the bottom of the bank.

Porthill, along with Bradwell and Wolstanton, is represented on the Staffordshire County Council by Graham Hutton (Conservative), as of 2021.

== See also ==
- Listed buildings in Newcastle-under-Lyme
