= St Margaret's Church, Wolstanton =

Church of St Margaret
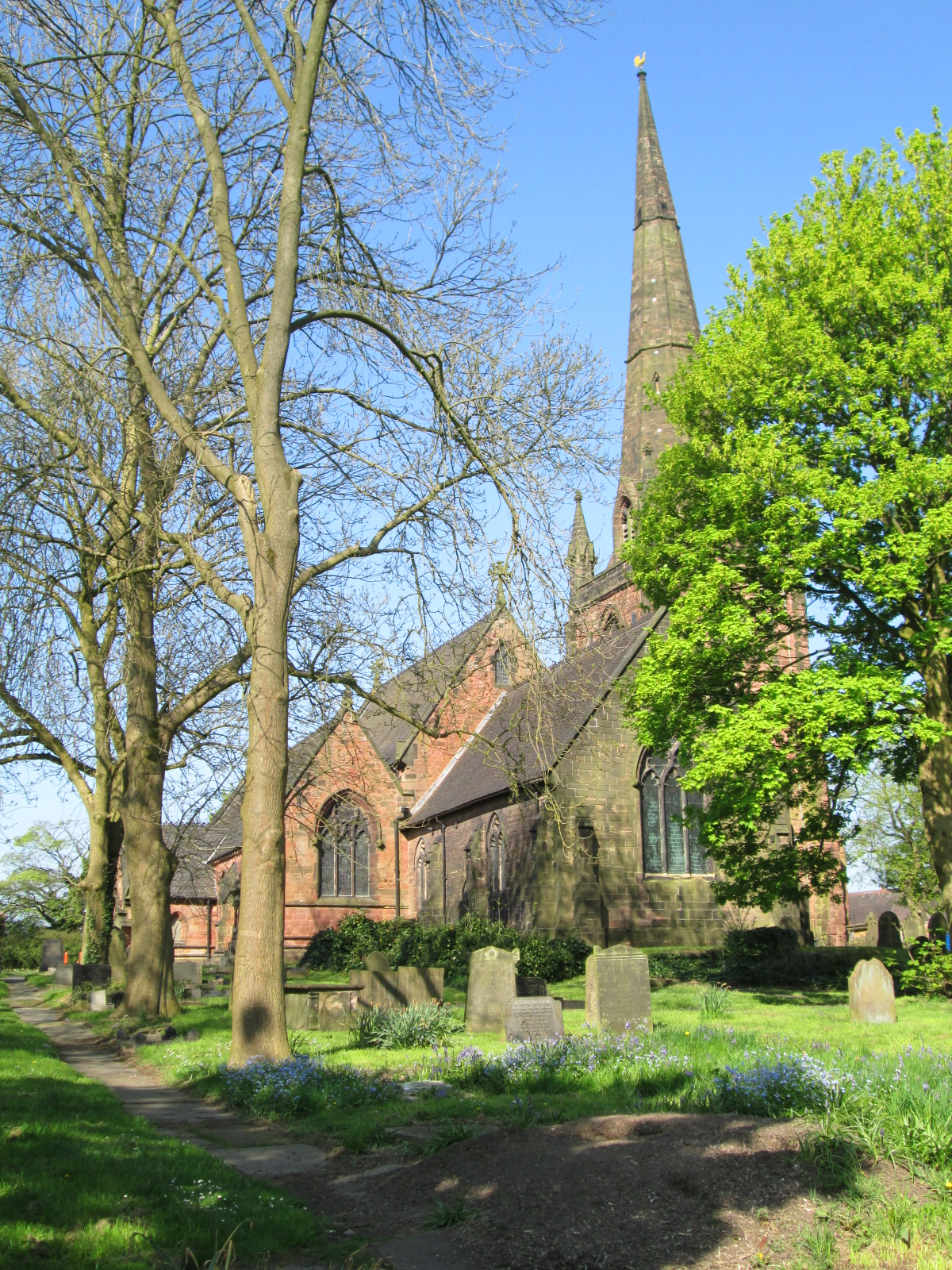
- Church of St Margaret
- 53°1′46.9″N 2°12′56.0″W
- OS grid reference: SJ 856 481
- Country: England
- Denomination: Church of England
- Website: www.stmargaretswolstanton.org

History
- Dedication: Saint Margaret

Architecture
- Heritage designation: Grade II*
- Designated: 21 October 1949
- Architect(s): Ward and Son; Anthony Salvin
- Style: Decorated

Administration
- Diocese: Diocese of Lichfield

St Margaret's Church is an Anglican church in Wolstanton, Staffordshire, England, and in the Diocese of Lichfield. The building is Grade II* listed.

== Description ==
The Domesday Book of 1086 mentions Wolstanton, and records that the village had a priest. Some of the building dates from the medieval period; the tower and octagonal spire, which, unusually, is on the north side, is on medieval foundations.

The church is in decorated style. There was rebuilding in 1623; the church was substantially rebuilt in 1860, by Ward and Son, the chancel being designed by Anthony Salvin.

=== Interior ===
The nave has arcades of four bays, and a hammerbeam roof. The chancel screen has wood tracery.

There are monuments in the chancel to the Sneyd family, in particular an alabaster chest tomb of the 16th century, in memory of Sir William Sneyd and his wife Anne; their recumbent effigies lie on the tomb. There are wall tablets in memory of other members of the family.

=== Bells ===
There are eight bells; six of them, cast in 1714, were originally in a church in Trentham, and installed at St Margaret's in 1767.

=== Churchyard ===
The grave of Henry Faulds (1843–1930), missionary and developer of fingerprinting, is in the churchyard.

The churchyard also contains the grave of Sarah Smith, who died in 1763 aged 21. The inscription alleges that she was murdered by poisoning, and suggests the name of the man responsible. The grave is Grade II listed.
