= Wolstanton =

Village in Staffordshire, England

Coordinates: 53.0294°N 2.2159°W

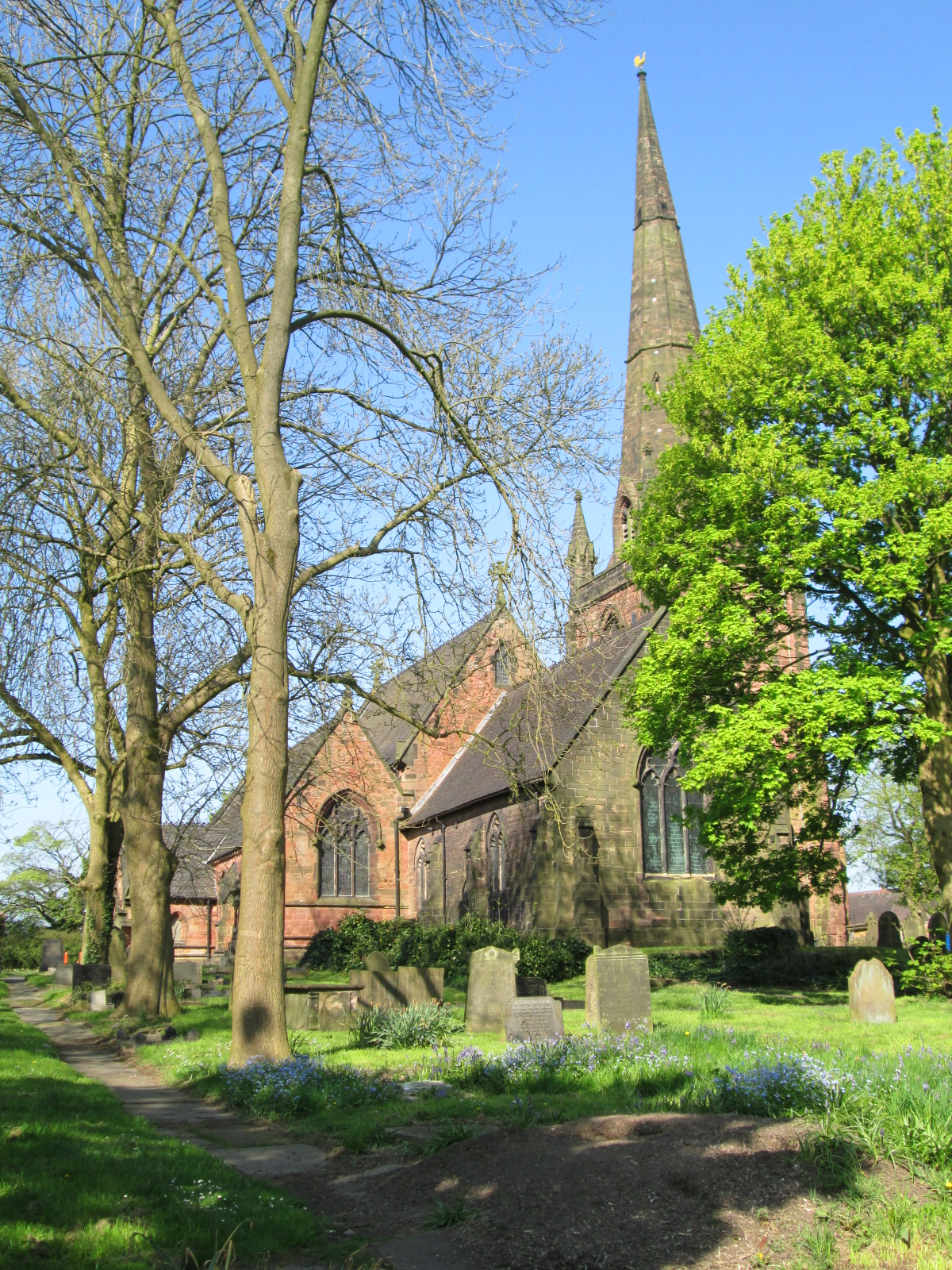
- St Margaret's Church

- Location within Staffordshire
- OS grid reference: SJ856480
- District: Newcastle-under-Lyme
- Shire county: Staffordshire
- Region: West Midlands
- Country: England
- Sovereign state: United Kingdom
- Post town: Newcastle
- Postcode district: ST5
- Dialling code: 01782
- Police: Staffordshire
- Fire: Staffordshire
- Ambulance: West Midlands
- UK Parliament: Newcastle-under-Lyme

Wolstanton is a village on the outskirts of Newcastle-under-Lyme, in the Newcastle-under-Lyme district, in the county of Staffordshire, England.

== History ==
The Roman road Rykeneld Street passed through Wolstanton.

Wolstanton is mentioned in the Norman Domesday Book of 1086, where it is listed amongst the lands belonging to the King. The land consisted of work for 2 ploughs, 14 villeins, 2 bordars and a priest (who had his own plough). Woodland then was measured as being a league by a furlong. When tax had been paid (by Ælfgar before the Norman Conquest) then it was set at six pounds.

Wolstanton Church, dedicated to St Margaret, is of red freestone. Rebuilt in 1860, it incorporated the layout and substantial elements of the old medieval church that had occupied the same site.

In 1931 the parish had a population of 15,002. On 1 April 1932 the parish was abolished and merged with Newcastle under Lyme.

== People and places ==
One of the village's many notable buildings is located on the corner of High Street and Nelson Street. During World War II and for some years afterwards, it was owned by the renowned Carr's Café and was daily frequented by the owners of many Stoke-on-Trent potteries who resided in the village. Ownership then passed to the District Bank (later incorporated into NatWest Bank) and subsequently Barclays Bank. Now it is known as Bank House, and is a retail outlet. A memorial plaque was unveiled there by Staffordshire Police in the summer of 2007 to commemorate the work of Henry Faulds, the fingerprint pioneer, who retired to live in the village at number 1 James Street and is buried at St Margaret's Church.

The architect Absalom Reed Wood (1851–1922) designed some of Wolstanton's grander buildings, including St Andrew's Church at the top of Porthill Bank and several of the houses along the High Street, just before the Porthill 'border'.

== Recent developments ==
Wolstanton Colliery was sunk in 1916. Originally an iron ore and coal mine, it was located just to the east of the village. Redeveloped in the 1960s, the shafts being deepened to reach the lowermost coal seams produced 1 million tons in 1963. The towering concrete structures located at the top of the shafts contained the 3 'Mine Winders', each winder motor rated 3300 horse power. The shafts at 1,265 Yards, were noted as the deepest in Britain and the coal working depth extending further as the deepest in Western Europe. The mine was connected underground with neighbouring Hanley Deep, Sneyd and Whitfield collieries. By 1986 it was closed completely, eventually replaced by Wolstanton Retail Park. Recorded between 1923 and 1946, pre-nationalization, some 14 miners are listed fatally injured. Between 1947 and 1985, some 38 Wolstanton miners were fatally injured. A memorial plaque is located on the approach road to the local Asda superstore that opened in 1989, and a commemorative 'winding wheel' features the newly opened Marks & Spencer flagship Superstore.

The large Asda store and the Wolstanton Retail Park now covers the main part of the former mine, and the colliery's former sports field is now—after some not inconsiderable opposition—being redeveloped with housing. A new road (originally proposed in 1978) has been built connecting the A500 with the A527 through the village, following for the most part the old colliery approach road (Grange Lane). Paid for by the developers of the site, Bloor Homes, this road finally opened to the public on 24 January 2008. In April 2012 planning permission was granted for a regional flagship Marks & Spencer store to be built on Wolstanton Retail Park. At 140,000sq ft its one of the largest in the UK.

== Notable residents ==
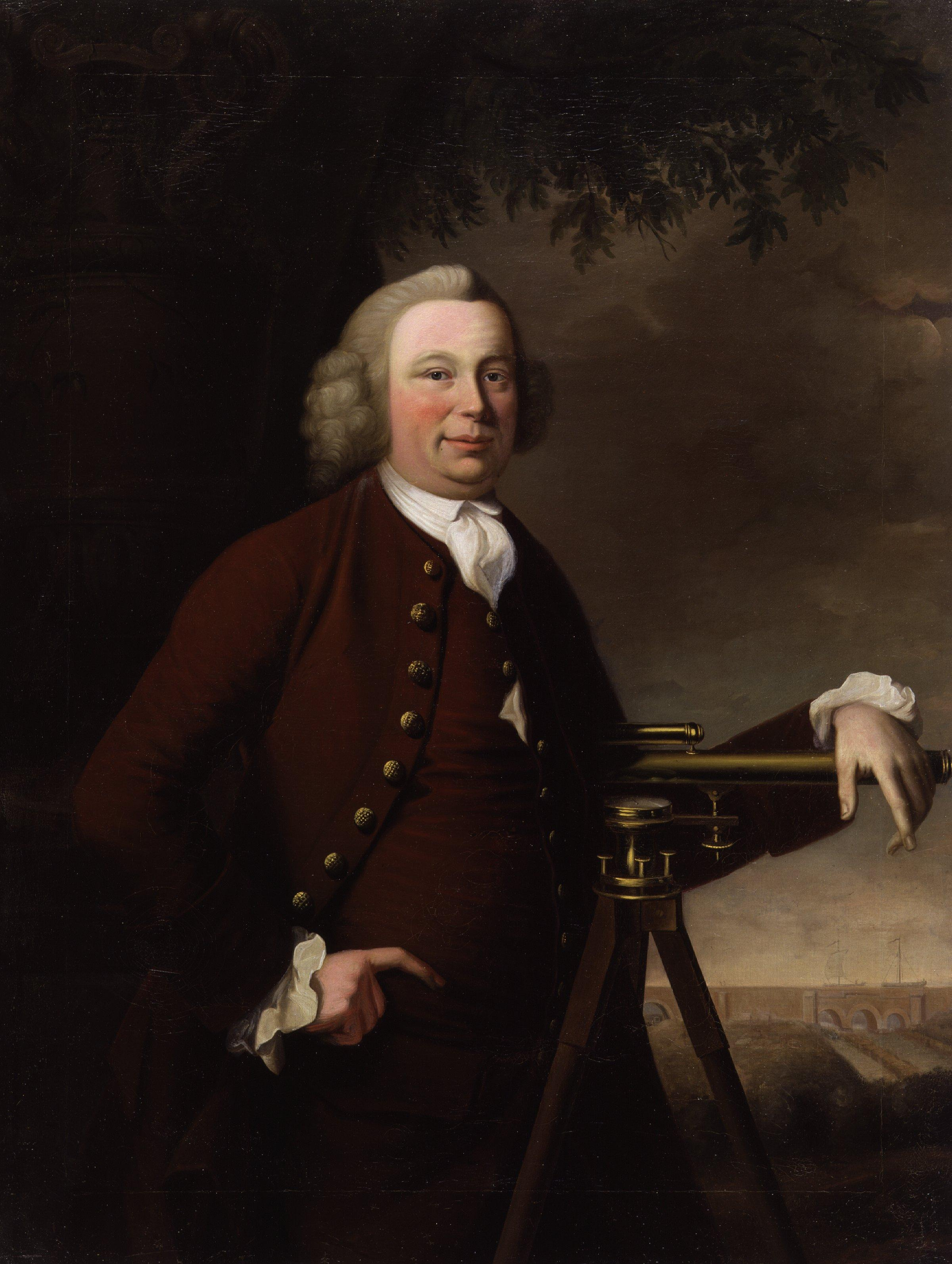
painting of James Brindley, 1770

- James Brindley (1716–1772), a pioneering canal engineer and lived at Turnhurst until his death.
- Hugh Henshall (1734–1816), civil engineer, worked on canals; brother-in-law of James Brindley
- Henry Faulds (1843–1930), a pioneer of forensic fingerprinting who retired to Wolstanton.
- Jessie van Hallen (1902–1983), a British ceramicist
- Arthur Berry (1925–1994): a playwright, poet, teacher and artist, lived locally
- Lorna Bailey (born 1978), an English potter and businesswoman.

=== Sport ===
- Billy Beats (1871–1936), footballer, played 403 league games
- Harry Sharpe (1901–1950), cricketer
- Syd Goodfellow (1915–1998), footballer, he made 303 league appearances
- Dennis Higgins (1915-1942), footballer for Tamworth and Fulham before World War II, in which he was killed.

== Sarah Smith ==
A remarkable grave is located in the churchyard of St Margaret's. The headstone of Sarah Smith (deceased 1783) includes a short poem written in the first person in which Sarah suggests that she was murdered; 'with half a pint of poyson he came to visit me' and then provides a clue to her killer, 'it was C___s B___w who brought me to my end'.

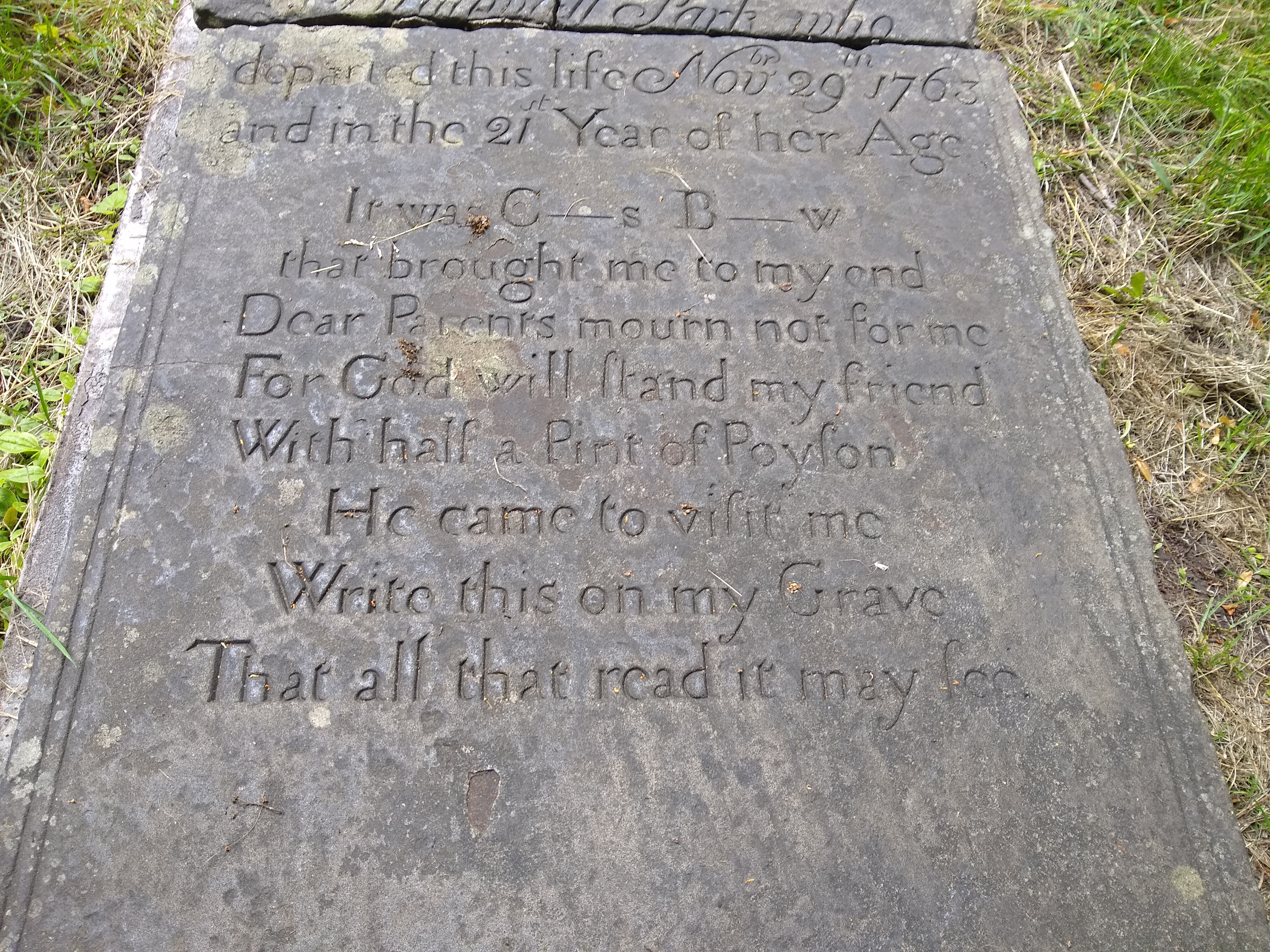
Photo of the grave of Sarah Smith showing the infamous accusation of murder.

== See also ==
- Listed buildings in Newcastle-under-Lyme

== Images ==
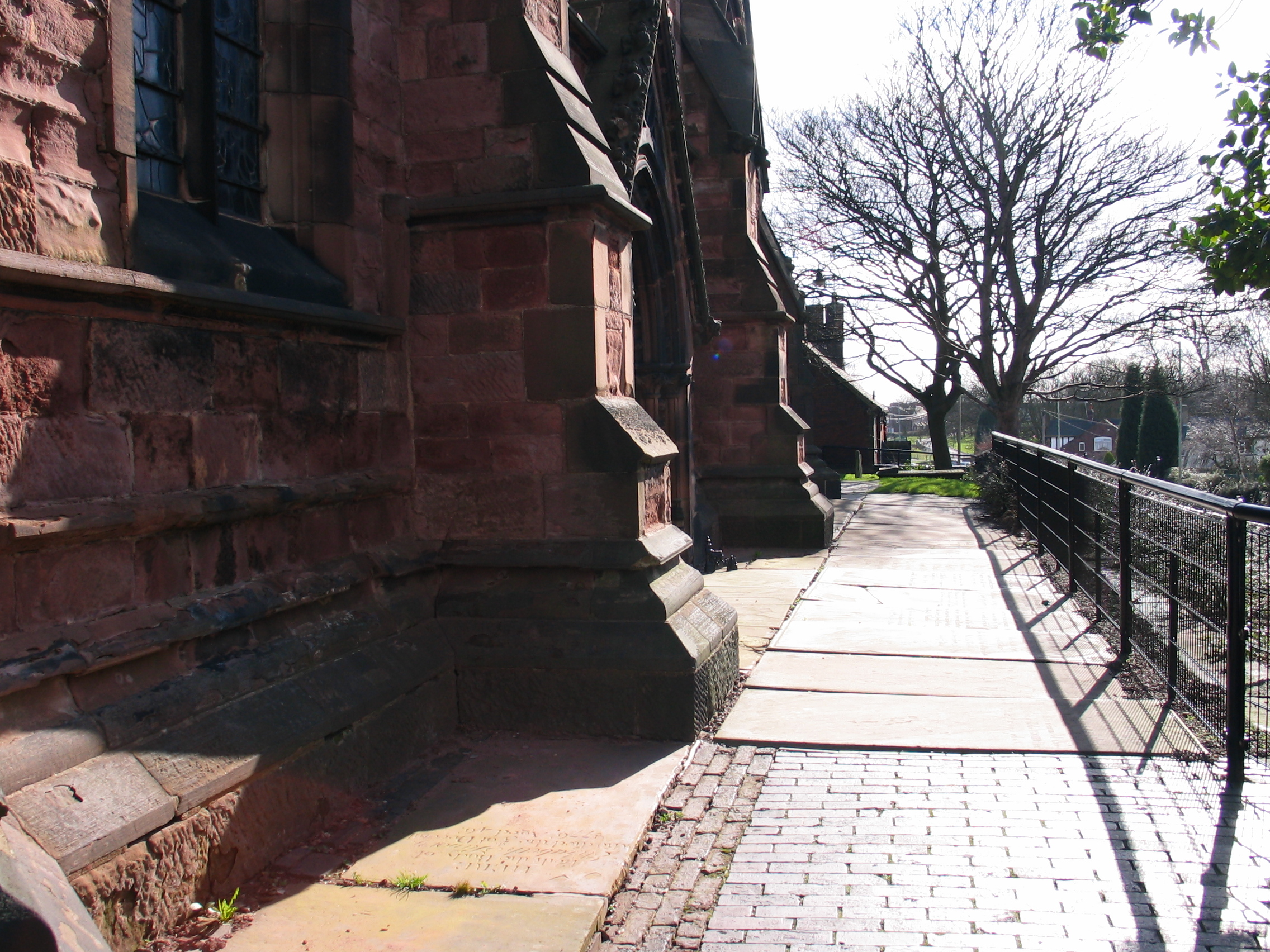
Wolstanton's St Margaret's Church

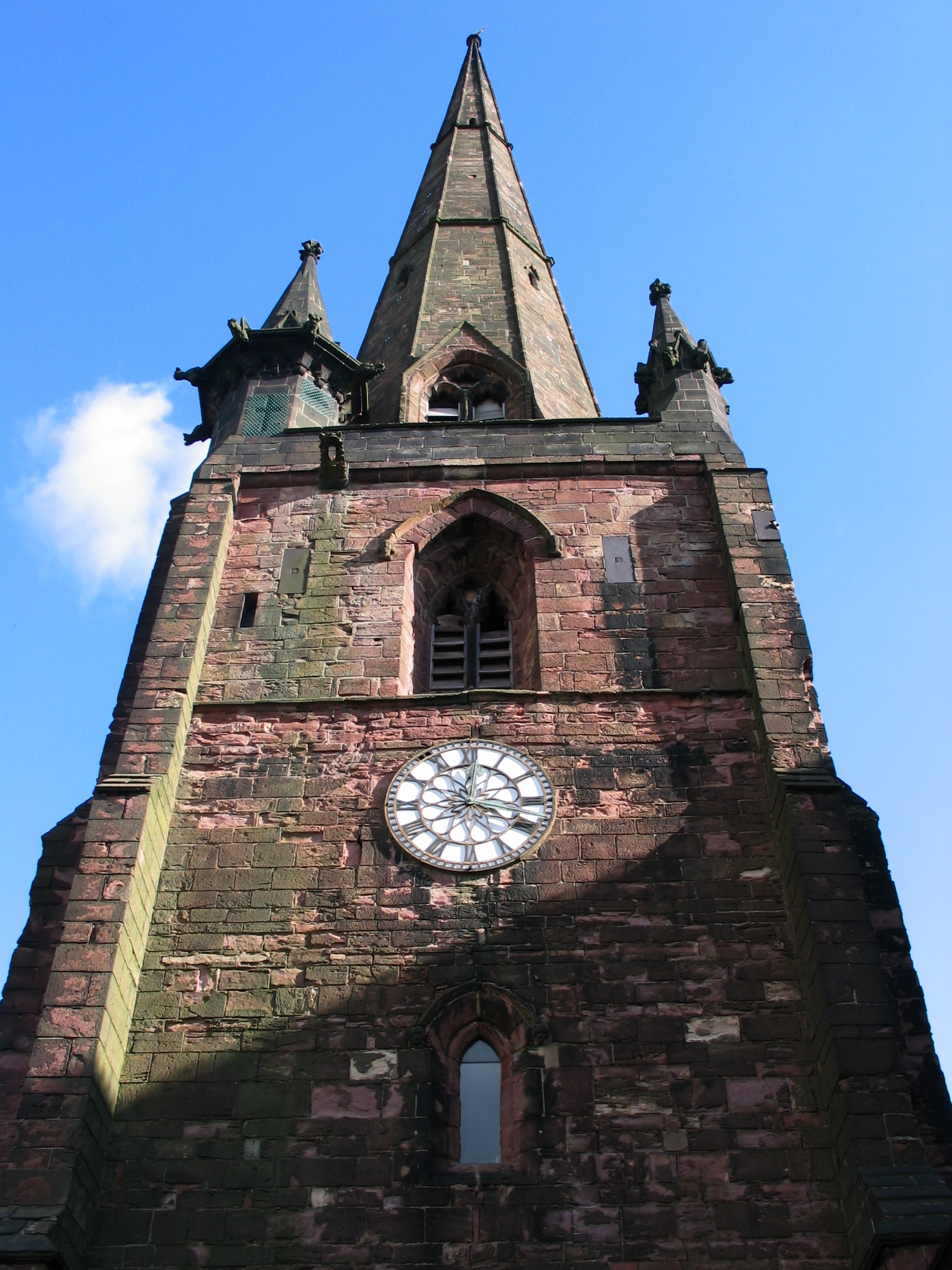
St Margaret's Spire

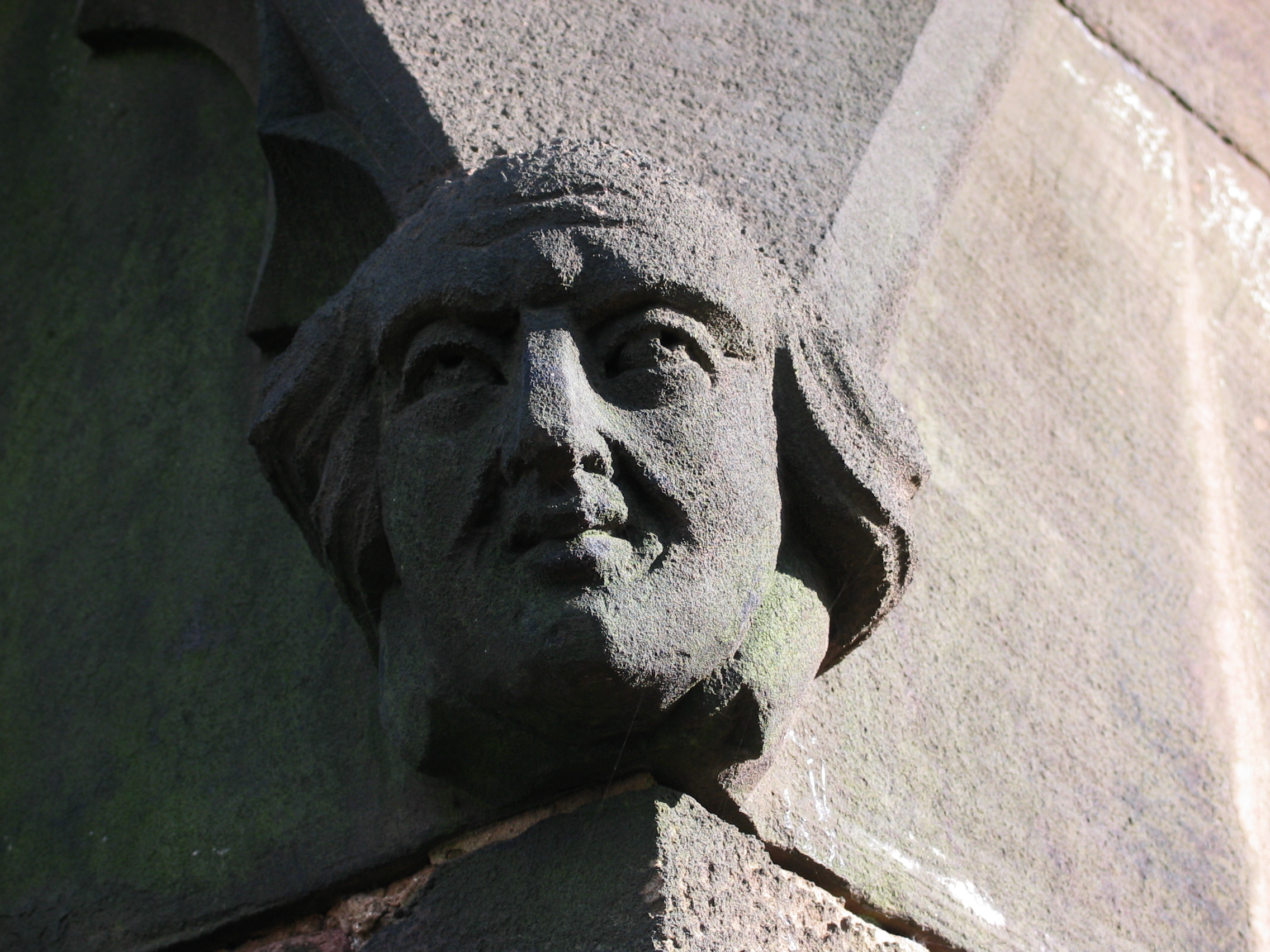
A St Margaret's Gargoyle

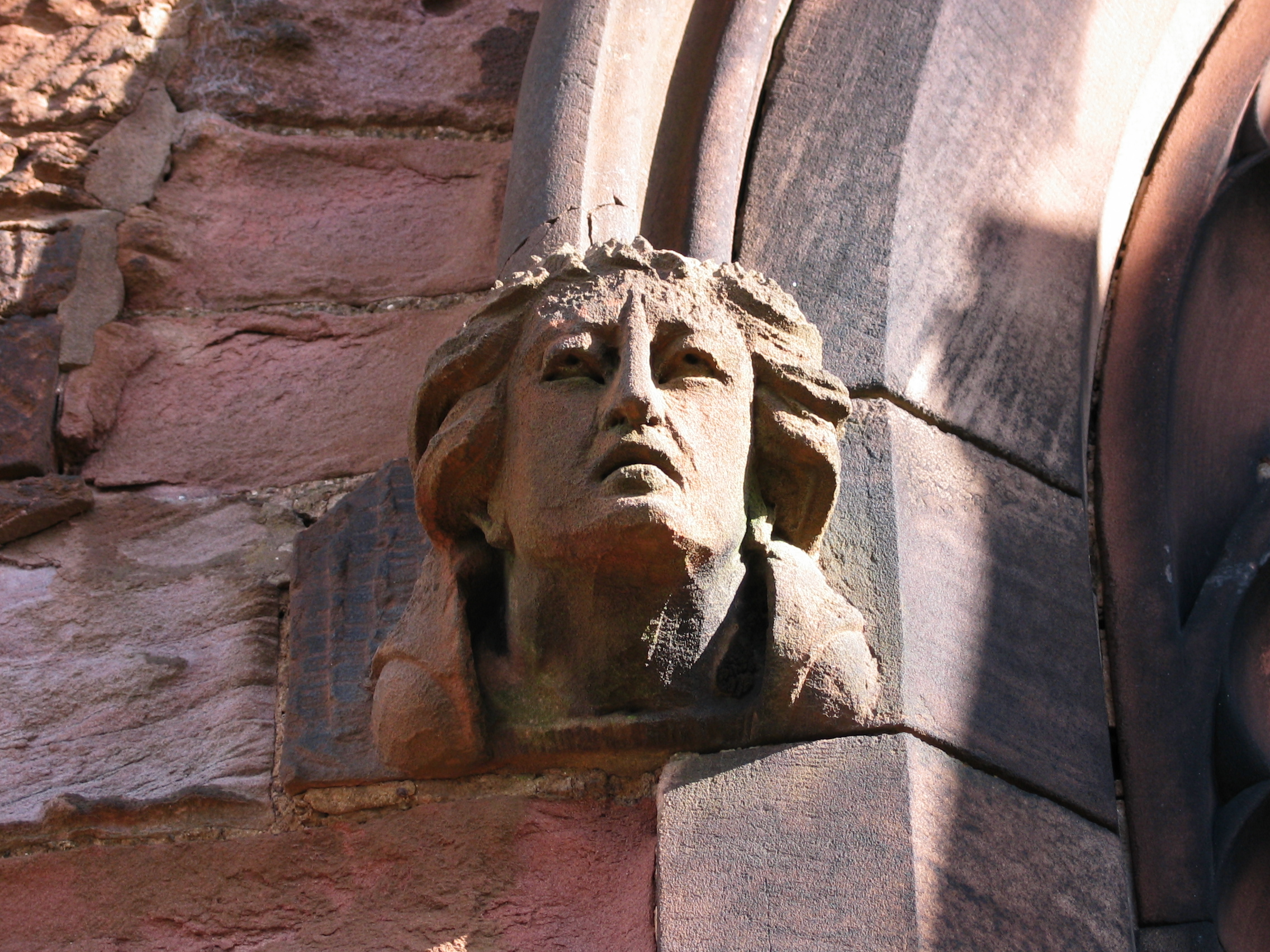
A St Margaret's Gargoyle

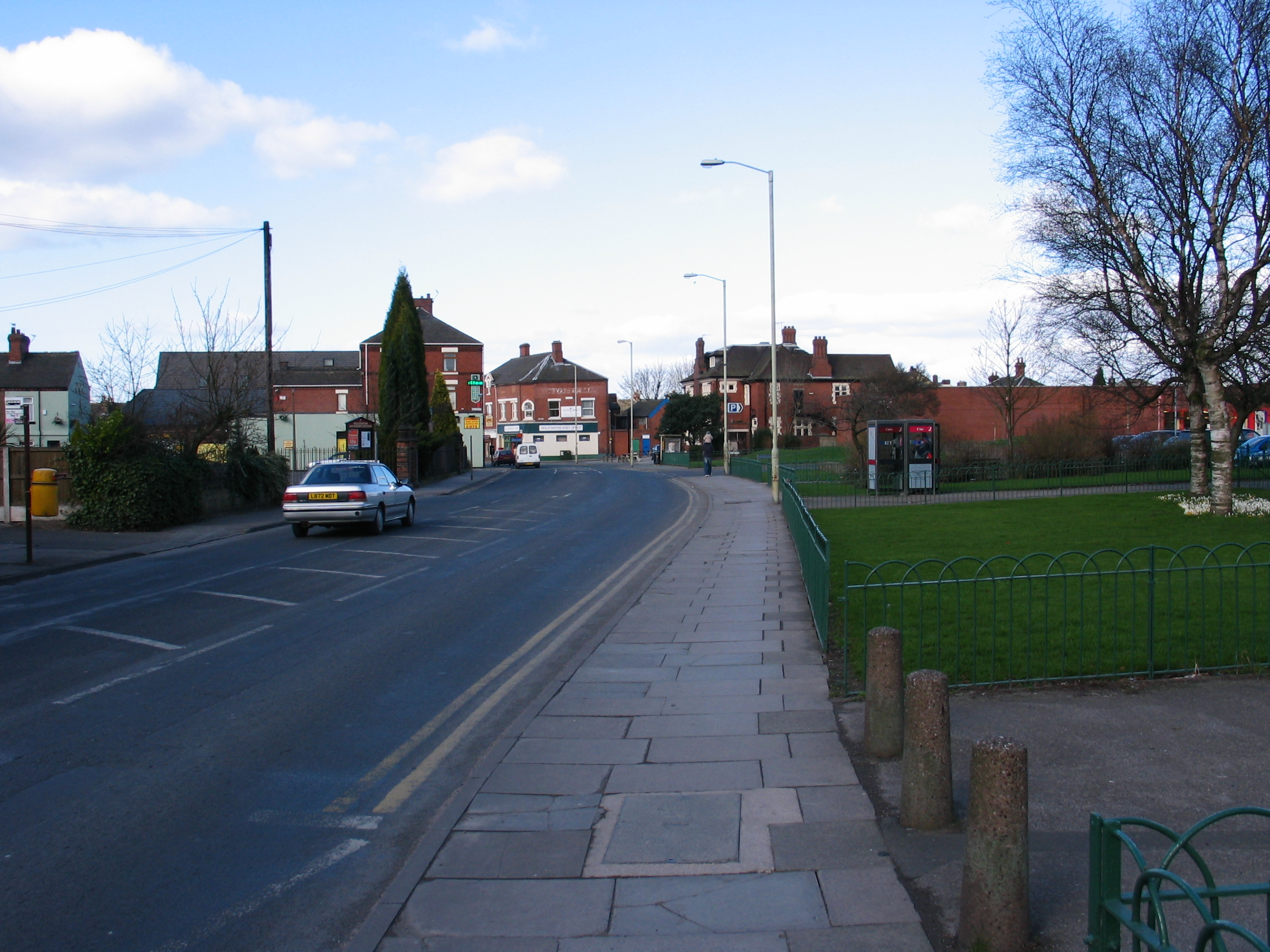
High St from Morris Square
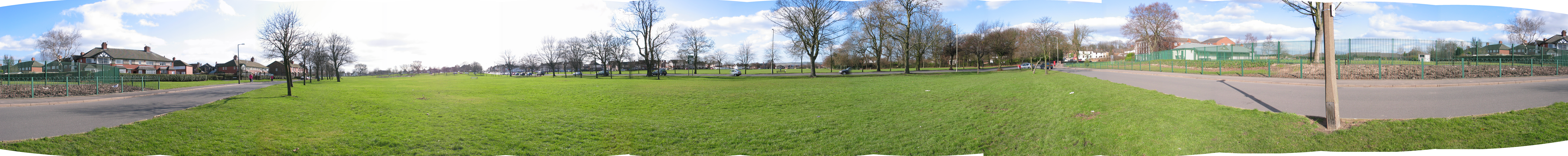
Panorama of Wolstanton Marsh from Moreton Parade, February 2004
